= Mighty Morphin Power Rangers =

American superhero television series

- Logo for the original Power Rangers series
- Also known as: MMPR
- Genre: Action; Adventure; Science fantasy Superhero; Tokusatsu
- Created by: Haim Saban; Shuki Levy
- Based on: Kyōryū Sentai Zyuranger; Gosei Sentai Dairanger & Ninja Sentai Kakuranger by Toei Company
- Developed by: Saban Entertainment; Toei Company
- Starring: Austin St. John; Walter Jones; Amy Jo Johnson; David Yost; Thuy Trang; Jason David Frank; Johnny Yong Bosch; Karan Ashley; Steve Cardenas; Catherine Sutherland; Paul Schrier; Jason Narvy; David Fielding
- Theme music composer: Ron Wasserman
- Opening theme: "Go Go Power Rangers"
- Composers: Ron Wasserman; Shuki Levy; Haim Saban (as Kussa Mahchi); Kenneth Burgomaster
- Countries of origin: United States; Japan
- Original language: English
- No. of seasons: 3
- No. of episodes: 145

Production
- Executive producers: Haim Saban; Shuki Levy
- Producers: Ronnie Hadar; Jonathan Tzachor
- Production locations: California (Greater Los Angeles Area) (Santa Clarita & Los Angeles); Japan (Greater Tokyo Area) (Tokyo, Saitama, Yokohama and Kyoto)
- Cinematography: Ilan Rosenberg; Sean Mclin (2nd unit)
- Camera setup: Single-camera
- Running time: 20–21 minutes
- Production companies: Saban Entertainment; Renaissance Atlantic Entertainment; Toei Company, Ltd. MMPR Productions, Inc.

Original release
- Network: Fox (Fox Kids)
- Release: August 28, 1993 – November 27, 1995

Related
- Power Rangers television series

Mighty Morphin Power Rangers (MMPR) is an American superhero television series produced by Saban Entertainment, which aired from August 28, 1993 to November 27, 1995, on the Fox Kids programming block, lasting three seasons. The series drew elements and stock footage from Super Sentai, a Japanese television series by Toei Company. Each season was inspired by Kyoryu Sentai Zyuranger, Gosei Sentai Dairanger, and Ninja Sentai Kakuranger, respectively. The series is the first entry of the Power Rangers franchise.

The series follows a group of teenagers from the fictional city of Angel Grove, California, chosen by the intergalactic being Zordon, to transform into the Power Rangers, a group of warriors prepared to fight against evil monsters sent from space by witch Rita Repulsa and her minions.

Mighty Morphin Power Rangers became a 1990s pop culture phenomenon, along with a large line of toys produced by Bandai, live tours, home media releases, and other merchandise, generating $1 billion in revenue by 1995. The third season of the show was immediately followed by mini-series Mighty Morphin Alien Rangers in 1996, spawning a long-lasting television franchise.

While a global storyline would continue in Power Rangers Zeo, Power Rangers Turbo, Power Rangers in Space (which would function respectively as the fourth, fifth, sixth seasons and would be grouped as the "Zordon Era"), subsequent seasons of the Power Rangers series would not be sequels or spin-offs in the traditional sense, having self-contained plots without any strong connections to the original series, while still set in the same universe. However, cast members and elements from Mighty Morphin Power Rangers would still be present on future iterations of the franchise, most notably, Jason David Frank reprising his role of Tommy Oliver in Power Rangers Dino Thunder.

The original series also spawned the feature film Mighty Morphin Power Rangers: The Movie, released by 20th Century Fox on June 30, 1995. Despite mixed reviews, it was a success at the box office and earned a cult following..

In 2017, a feature film titled Power Rangers was released, serving as a reboot for the franchise. Due to both the film's financial failure and Hasbro's acquisition of the franchise in 2018, another reboot is in development.

A television special titled Mighty Morphin Power Rangers: Once & Always commemorated the 30th anniversary of the series and premiered on Netflix on April 19, 2023.

== Plot ==
=== Season 1 (1993–1994) ===
The series takes place in the fictional town of Angel Grove, California. On an exploratory mission on the moon, two astronauts discover an extraterrestrial container (referred to as a dumpster) and breach the unit, inadvertently releasing the evil alien sorceress Rita Repulsa and her minions from 10,000 years of confinement. Upon her release, she and her army of evil space aliens set their sights on conquering the nearest planet—Earth. The wise sage Zordon, who was responsible for capturing Rita, later becomes aware of her release and orders his robotic assistant Alpha 5 to select five "teenagers with attitude" to defend the Earth from Rita's attacks. The five teens chosen are Jason Lee Scott, Kimberly Hart, Zack Taylor, Trini Kwan, and Billy Cranston. Zordon gives them the ability to transform into a superhuman fighting force known as the Power Rangers. This provides them with formidable abilities and an arsenal of weapons, as well as colossal assault vehicles called Zords which can combine into a giant humanoid robot known as the Megazord.

The series begins with the five teenagers combating Rita and her seemingly endless array of monsters, while also dealing with typical teenage problems and clashing with local bullies Bulk and Skull. However, consecutive failures lead Rita to adopt a new method for conquering Earth and destroying the Power Rangers—by attacking them with one of their own. Using her magic, Rita kidnaps and brainwashes a local teen whose fighting skills prove to equal that of Jason's in a martial-arts tournament held in Angel Grove. The new teen, Tommy Oliver, passes Rita's tests, becoming the Green Ranger. Entrusted with Rita's Sword of Darkness, the source for the continuance of the evil spell he has fallen victim to, Tommy comes dangerously close to defeating the Power Rangers. After sabotaging the Command Center and cutting off Zordon's connection to their dimension, Tommy helps Rita strike another blow to the Rangers when the Megazord is drained of its power in battle by a solar eclipse and then blasted into a molten lava crevice. However, Alpha eventually succeeds in reestablishing connection with Zordon, who then revives the Megazord. With it, the Rangers stop Tommy's rampage on Angel Grove with his Dragonzord, and Jason ultimately defeats Tommy in a one-on-one duel by destroying the Sword of Darkness. Now free from Rita's spell, Tommy chooses to use his Green Ranger powers to assist the Rangers in defeating the evil that gave it to him in the first place and the Dragonzord is reconfigured to enable it to help form more powerful Zord combinations alongside the other Dinozords.

As time goes on, Rita focuses on eliminating Tommy to regain the powers that she believes belong to her. Using a special wax that was touched by Tommy when he was brainwashed by her, Rita uses a magic Green Candle to slowly remove his powers, returning them to her. In the end, Tommy loses his powers, but he prevents Rita from reclaiming them by transferring them to Jason who, feeling guilty for failing to protect Tommy's powers, accepts them. However, Tommy later returns to the team when the other Rangers' Power Coins are handed over to Rita in exchange for their kidnapped parents. With Zordon's help, Tommy regains his powers and successfully retrieves the other Rangers' Power Coins. However, Tommy's regained powers are only temporary and must be frequently re-charged by Zordon, who warns him that the Green Ranger's powers will ultimately fail. Despite this, Tommy remains determined to continue assisting the other Rangers as long as possible.

=== Season 2 (1994–1995) ===
Lord Zedd, an intergalactic warlord and Rita's superior, arrives at Rita's Moon Palace, where he takes her place and throws her into a space dumpster again. He then begins his own campaign to conquer Earth. In order for the Power Rangers to compete with Zedd's monsters, which are superior to the ones Finster made by Rita, Zordon and Alpha upgrade the Dinozords into the more powerful Thunderzords (which combine into the Thunder Megazord). However, Tommy is forced to retain use of the Dragonzord, due to his Green Ranger powers being too weak to support a new Zord.

After several defeats, Zedd's attacks on the Rangers progressively become more violent. He focuses his attention on eliminating Tommy, whom he sees as Rita's biggest mistake in giving him the Dragon Power Coin. The Green Ranger's powers rapidly deteriorate, but Zedd's efforts enhances the process. He succeeds with a special Green Crystal and uses it to completely take away the Green Ranger's powers, and powers up Zedd's Dark Rangers. When Tommy smashes the crystal, the Dark Rangers are sent away. Following the loss of the Green Ranger's powers, Zordon and Alpha create, in secret, a new White Ranger to aid the other Rangers in battle. The White Ranger is revealed to be Tommy, who in addition receives a new Zord, the Tigerzord, and also becomes the new leader of the Power Rangers (replacing Jason), with a power that cannot be controlled or taken by the forces of evil.

During the Team Ninja Trials in Angel Grove, the Rangers become friends with three teenagers from Stone Canyon: Rocky DeSantos, Adam Park and Aisha Campbell. During an ensuing battle with Zedd and a magical serpent, Rocky, Adam and Aisha discover the Rangers' identities and, having been entrusted with their secret by Zordon, the three newcomers become allies of the Rangers. Later on, Jason, Zack and Trini are selected to represent Angel Grove at a World Peace Conference in Geneva, Switzerland, and the Rangers are faced with the task of finding replacements. To transfer the powers of the Red, Black and Yellow Rangers, they must find the Sword of Light, which is located on a deserted planet. Zedd pursues them across the galaxy in Serpentera, his massive personal Zord, and destroys most of the deserted planet. Serpentera runs out of power before being able to finish the Rangers, and they return to Earth safely with the Sword of Light. Zordon then chooses Rocky, Adam and Aisha to replace Jason, Zack and Trini as the Red, Black and Yellow Rangers, respectively.

Sometime before the power transfer, during the time when Tommy was being turned into the white ranger, Rita had returned to Earth and fell into the hands of Bulk and Skull, but the Rangers sent her back into space. She later returns to the Moon while the Rangers are in Australia, and with the help of Finster, she gets a special "makeover" to gain a younger and "prettier" face. She then uses a love potion on Zedd, who is in a deep sleep during his centennial re-evilizer, and he falls in love with her when he wakes up. They get married and join forces to make an even more terrible threat for the Rangers, but not even this can prepare them for what is to come.

=== Season 3 (1995) ===
Rito Revolto, Rita's skeletal brother, comes to Earth and destroys the Rangers' Thunderzords and the Tigerzord with the help of a group of monsters. As a result, the Dinozords are also destroyed and the Power Coins are damaged beyond repair. Undaunted, the Power Rangers seek the aid of Ninjor, the alleged creator of the Power Coins, who gives them new Ninja Power Coins, providing them with the even more powerful Ninjazords (which combine into the Ninja Megazord) and the Falconzord.

Some time later, an Australian girl named Katherine Hillard moves to Angel Grove. She nearly befriends the rangers and displays an intense affection for Tommy. Later it is found out that Rita had Katherine and put her under a powerful spell, giving her the ability to transform into a cat as well as a cat-like monster. Under this spell, she steals Kimberly's Ninja Power Coin, vastly weakening and nearly killing the Pink Ranger, due to how her life force – like that of the other Rangers – is connected to her Ninja Coin. It is during this time that the Rangers acquire their most powerful Zords: the Shogunzords (which combine into the Shogun Megazord), but only after having to agree to help Lord Zedd destroy Angel Grove and subsequently betray him. Eventually, Katherine overcomes Rita's evil spell and returns the Pink Ninja Power Coin to Kimberly. A short time later, Kimberly gets a chance to pursue her personal athletic dreams. With Zordon's blessing, she leaves to train for the Pan Global Games in Florida, choosing Katherine to replace her as the Pink Ranger. Though her initial fear and hesitation keeps her from contributing fully to the fight against evil, Katherine eventually becomes both comfortable and capable of fulfilling her duty as the second Pink Ranger.

After several more battles, Zedd and Rita are joined by Rita's father, Master Vile. Following his failed attempts to defeat the Rangers, he reverses time, turning the Rangers into powerless children. These events culminate in the mini-series Mighty Morphin Alien Rangers and lead to the next incarnation of the franchise, entitled Power Rangers Zeo.

== Cast and characters ==
=== Power Rangers ===
The five original Power Rangers, from left: Zack, Trini, Jason, Kimberly, and Billy

- Jason Lee Scott
  The first Red Ranger of MMPR and the first leader of the team. He wields the Power Sword and pilots the Tyrannosaurus Dinozord and Red Dragon Thunderzord. Also commands the Dino Megazord and Thunder Megazord. During Tommy's absence, he wields the Dragon Dagger and controls the Green Ranger's Dragonzord. Jason was portrayed by Austin St. John.
- Zack Taylor
  The first Black Ranger of MMPR. He wields the Power Axe and pilots the Mastodon Dinozord and Lion Thunderzord. Also commands the Dragonzord in Battle Mode. Zack was portrayed by Walter Emanuel Jones.
- Kimberly Hart
  The first Pink Ranger of MMPR and the first Pink Ninja Ranger. She wields the Power Bow and pilots the Pterodactyl Dinozord, Firebird Thunderzord, and Crane Ninjazord. Kimberly was portrayed by Amy Jo Johnson.
- Billy Cranston
  The Blue Ranger of MMPR and the Blue Ninja Ranger; also the longest-lasting member of the original team. He wields the Power Lance and pilots the Triceratops Dinozord, Unicorn Thunderzord, Wolf Ninjazord, and Blue Shogunzord. Also commands the Dino Megazord (after Jason). Billy was portrayed by David Yost.
- Trini Kwan
  The first Yellow Ranger of MMPR. She wields the Power Daggers and pilots Sabertooth Tiger Dinozord and Griffin Thunderzord. Trini was portrayed by Thuy Trang.
- Tommy Oliver
  The Green Ranger and White Ranger of MMPR; also the White Ninja Ranger and the second leader of the team following Jason's departure. He wields the Dragon Dagger (as the Green Ranger) and the Saba Sword (as the White Ranger) and pilots the Dragonzord, White Tigerzord, Falcon Ninjazord, and White Shogunzord (with Katherine). Tommy was portrayed by Jason David Frank.
- Rocky DeSantos
  The second Red Ranger of MMPR and the Red Ninja Ranger. He wields the Power Sword and pilots the Red Dragon Thunderzord (after Jason), Ape Ninjazord, Red Shogunzord and Tyrannosaurus Dinozord (after Jason). Also commands the Thunder Megazord (after Jason), Ninja Megazord, and Shogun Megazord. Rocky was portrayed by Steve Cardenas.
- Adam Park
  The second Black Ranger of MMPR and the Black Ninja Ranger. He wields the Power Axe and pilots the Lion Thunderzord (after Zack), Frog Ninjazord, and Black Shogunzord. Adam was portrayed by Johnny Yong Bosch.
- Aisha Campbell
  The second Yellow Ranger of MMPR and the Yellow Ninja Ranger. She wields the Power Daggers and pilots the Griffin Thunderzord (after Trini), Bear Ninjazord, and Yellow Shogunzord. Aisha was portrayed by Karan Ashley.
- Katherine "Kat" Hillard
  The second Pink Ranger of MMPR and the second Pink Ninja Ranger. She wields the Power Bow and pilots the Crane Ninjazord (after Kimberly), White Shogunzord (with Tommy), and Pterodactyl Dinozord (after Kimberly). Kat was portrayed by Catherine Sutherland.

=== Supporting characters ===
- Zordon
  An inter-dimensional being trapped in a time warp, he is the wise mentor of the Rangers, who also bestowed their powers. 10,000 years ago, Zordon led the fight against the forces of evil, specifically Rita. Finally, he was able to imprison the evil witch and her minions in a dumpster on the Moon. He once had a corporeal human form, but now appears as a floating head in an energy tube. He is initially voiced and portrayed by David Fielding, and later voiced by Robert L. Manahan.
- Alpha 5
  A multi-functional semi-sentient automaton from Edenoi, Alpha was Zordon's trusted robotic assistant, responsible for the daily operations and upkeep of the Command Center. He is portrayed by Sandi Sellner and is voiced by Richard Steven Horvitz.
- Farkas "Bulk" Bulkmeier and Eugene "Skull" Skullovitch
  Two bullies at Angel Grove High School. Bulk, the leader, was prone to dragging Skull into wacky schemes, which usually failed miserably and ended in humiliation or injury. In the second season, the two decide to discover the identities of the Power Rangers after they were saved by the Rangers in "The Mutiny". In the third season, they enroll in the Junior Police Force. Thanks to the efforts of their superior officer, Lt. Stone, the duo become good-natured goofs, but still sometimes selfish. They are portrayed by Paul Schrier (Bulk) and Jason Narvy (Skull).
- Ernie
  The owner and proprietor of the Youth Center, he could often be seen behind the counter of the Juice Bar, and would sometimes dispense advice to the teens. He is portrayed by Richard Genelle.
- Mr. Caplan
  The stern principal of Angel Grove High School, who often encouraged his students in their extracurricular activities. He wore a toupée, which serves as a running gag during seasons 1 and 2. He is portrayed by Harold Cannon (uncredited)
- Ms. Appleby
  A teacher at Angel Grove High School. She is portrayed by Royce Herron (uncredited).
- Angela
  The girl of Zack's affections, he was constantly attempting to impress and go on a date with her, much to her annoyance. She would often demean Zack for his attempts, but later in season 1, she starts to like him. She only appears in season 1. She is portrayed by Renee Griggs (uncredited).
- Curtis
  Zack's cousin who appears very early on in season 2, and was phased out of the show shortly after Zack's departure. He is portrayed by Joel Rogers (uncredited).
- Richie
  Another teen introduced early in season 2 to aid Ernie with running the juice bar and who was planned to be Trini's love interest. Like Curtis, he too was phased out of the show following Trini's departure. He is portrayed by Maurice Mendoza (uncredited).
- Jerome Stone
  A Police Lieutenant with the Angel Grove Police Department. He is portrayed by Gregg Bullock.
- Prince Dex/Masked Rider
  A warrior from Alpha's home planet of Edenoi who leads a resistance movement against its ruthless dictator Count Dregon, an acquaintance and rival of Lord Zedd. He is portrayed by Ted Jan Roberts.
- Ninjor
  The creator of the original 6 Power Coins and Dinozords that were used by the original 6 Power Rangers, even though it was Zordon who distributed them. He is portrayed by Hideaki Kusaka and voiced by Kim Strauss.
- Wild West Rangers
  The Old West ancestors of Rocky, Adam, Aisha and Billy, who temporarily obtain Ranger Powers when Kimberly is transported to their time. Named Rocko, Abraham, Miss Alicia and William. As Rangers, the Wild West Rangers have outfits identical to those of their descendants, except for the addition of cowboy attire.

=== Antagonists ===
- Rita Repulsa
  The first main antagonist for the series. Rita Repulsa is an alien sorceress who was imprisoned in a dumpster on the Moon with her minions until some astronauts accidentally freed her. She is portrayed by Machiko Soga in Season 1 and Carla Perez onward. She was voiced by Barbara Goodson.
- Lord Zedd
  An intergalactic warlord who is the main antagonist starting in season 2, along with Rita. Using his staff, Lord Zedd can turn anything into a monster. He was portrayed by Ed Neil (uncredited) and voiced by Robert Axelrod.
- Goldar
  A manticore-themed creature who is Rita's and later Zedd's main henchman. He is portrayed by Takashi Sakamoto, Kazutoshi Yokoyama, and Danny Wayne Stallcup (former two uncredited). He was voiced by Kerrigan Mahan.
- Rito Revolto
  A Gashadokuro-themed creature who is Rita's brother and a secondary antagonist/henchman for season 3. He is portrayed by Kenichi Endō and Danny Wayne Stallcup. He was voiced by Bob Papenbrook.
- Scorpina
  A scorpion-themed female and partner of Goldar who becomes a scorpion-themed monster when enlarged. She is portrayed by Ami Kawai in Season 1, and Sabrina Lu in Season 2 (1 episode only) and wasn't seen again afterwards. She was voiced by Wendee Lee.
- Finster
  A leprechaun-themed creature who is Rita's chief monster maker in season 1. By season 3, he still occasionally makes monsters. He was portrayed by Takako Iiboshi (uncredited) and voiced by Robert Axelrod.
- Squatt
  One of Rita's henchmen. A short, fat, blue hobgoblin-themed creature, he is usually blamed for Rita or Zedd's failures. He was portrayed by Minoru Watanabe (uncredited) and voiced by Michael Sorich.
- Baboo
  One of Rita's henchmen. A tall, vampire-like creature who wears a monocle. He usually chastises Squatt when Rita's plans fail and is often blamed. He was portrayed by Hideaki Kusaka (uncredited) and voiced by Dave Mallow.
- Master Vile
  Rita and Rito's father and an antagonist in season 3. He was portrayed by Hideaki Kusaka and voiced by Simon Prescott (both uncredited).
- Lokar
  A floating, demonic, ethereal, he is an old friend of Rita's and she called on him for a favor to defeat the Rangers. He was portrayed by Masahiko Urano (uncredited) and voiced by Robert Axelrod.
- Putty Patrollers
  The golem warriors made of clay who act as Rita Repulsa's foot soldiers, the Putties are often sent to wear the Rangers down before a monster battle, as well as for sabotage and other special missions. The original Puttys were based on Golem Soldiers, which were the Sentai Counterpart on Zyuranger.
  - Z-Putties
    In Season 2, Lord Zedd upgrades the Putty design, completely replacing Rita's original design. Zedd's Putties (or Z-Putties for short) are superior to the original Putties and are more expendable. However, the Z-Putties also have a big weakness—striking the Z-logo on their chests causes the Z-Putties to explode into pieces. The Z-Putties were the first group of Power Ranger exclusive foot soldiers.
- Tenga Warriors
  The crow-like soldiers that are able to speak. They are introduced in Season 3 when Rito takes them with him to the Moon as a wedding gift and replaced Zedd's Putties. The Rangers normally use their Ninja Ranger powers to fight them. Unlike the Putties, the Tenga Warriors are not expendable and they return to the Moon when defeated. The Tengas originated in Mighty Morphin Power Rangers: The Movie (going by the name "Tengu Warriors") under the command of Ivan Ooze. The name changed between the movie and show was because of copyright complications with the movie's producer 20th Century Fox. Like the Z-Putties, the Tengas were the second group of foot soldiers exclusive to Power Rangers.

== Episodes ==
Season	Episodes	Originally released		
Season	Episodes	First released	Last released	Network
1	60	August 28, 1993	May 23, 1994	Fox (Fox Kids)
2	52	July 21, 1994	May 20, 1995	Fox (Fox Kids)
3	33	September 2, 1995	November 27, 1995	Fox (Fox Kids)
Re-version	32	January 2, 2010	August 28, 2010	ABC (ABC Kids)
Special		April 19, 2023		Netflix

=== Season 1 (1993–94) ===
No. overall	No. in season	Title	Directed by	Written by	Original release date	Prod. code
1	1	"Day of the Dumpster"	Adrian Carr	Tony Oliver & Shuki Levy	August 28, 1993	101
When two astronauts come across a strange dumpster on the Moon, they open it, accidentally releasing Rita Repulsa and her minions Goldar, Squatt, Baboo, and Finster. Rita then sets her eyes on the nearest planet: Earth. Meanwhile, at a local youth center in Angel Grove, California, we are introduced to "teenagers with attitude" Jason, Zack, Kimberly, Billy, and Trini. Within the California desert, at the Command Center, Zordon and Alpha 5 are alerted of Rita's escape and teleport the five to the Command Center. After receiving Power Morphers, the teens morph into the Mighty Morphin Power Rangers and take on Goldar and the Putty Patrollers. Also making their debut are the bullies, Bulk and Skull, and Juice Bar proprietor Ernie.
2	2	"High Five"	Adrian Carr	Steve Kramer	September 7, 1993	102
After seeing Jason climb a rope at Ernie's Juice Bar, Trini reveals to the other Rangers that she is terrified of heights. Billy unveils his latest invention: wrist communicators with which they can contact Zordon and also teleport to the Command Center. On the Moon, Rita, now aware of the Rangers true identities, sets her sights on Angel Grove and decides to trap the Rangers in a time warp the same way she did Zordon. Squatt and Baboo send a rigged toy rocket to Earth that activates the time warp. Rita has Finster create the skeleton-like monster Bones and his Skeleton Warrior-themed Putty Patrollers to control the time warp. Zordon sends the teens to defeat a small band of Putties. During the fight, Billy gets chased to the top of a cliff, and Trini must face her fears to save him. After Bones is destroyed, Rita casts a spell to summon a Giant who grabs Jason. He summons the Tyrannosaurus Zord which destroys the Giant.
3	3	"Teamwork"	Robert Hughes	Cheryl Saban	September 8, 1993	103
Kimberly and Trini attempt to close down a hazardous waste dump. Little do they know Rita is behind the dumpsite and plans to destroy the Earth by pollution. The Putty Patrol soon ambushes the two girls. Rita unleashes the powerful Mighty Minotaur onto Earth to keep the others busy. The boys are forced to morph and confront the Minotaur first. He proves to be an overwhelming opponent, and Rita uses her wand to make him grow. Trini and Kimberly defeat the putties, and the Rangers summon their Dinozords. Predicting defeat, Zordon calls them back to the Command Center and awards the Rangers special weapons: Jason the Power Sword, Trini the Power Daggers, Billy the Power Lance, Kimberly the Power Bow, and Zack the Power Axe. Working as a team, and combining their new arsenal into the "Power Blaster", the Rangers finally destroy the Mighty Minotaur.
4	4	"A Pressing Engagement"	Adrian Carr	Jeff Deckman & Ronnie Sperling	September 9, 1993	104
At the Juice Bar, Jason is trying to break Bulk's bench-pressing record, but is unable to. Doubting his ability, Kimberly and Zack try to comfort him but have mixed success. Rita decides to isolate Jason from the others by sending King Sphinx to Earth. With his mighty wings, the monster blows Kimberly and Zack away, leaving Jason alone. After teleporting himself and Jason to a desert, Sphinx is joined by Goldar. After regrouping with Billy and Trini, the teens arrive at the Command Center and witness first-hand Jason's struggle with a grown Goldar and Sphinx.
5	5	"Different Drum"	Jeff Reiner	Julianne Klemm	September 10, 1993	105
Kimberly teaches a dance class at the juice bar. A young deaf girl named Melissa starts to run into the other girls. Embarrassed because of her impaired hearing, Melissa leaves. Rita decides that music is the perfect way to conquer the Rangers. She summons Gnarly Gnome, a goblin-like gnome with a magical accordion, and sends him to Earth. Gnarly Gnome's music hypnotizes some girls from the dancing class, and they are lured to a cave.
6	6	"Food Fight"	Robert Hughes	Cheryl Saban	September 4, 1993	106
Ernie hosts a Cultural Food Fair at the juice bar, and the Rangers help, offering foods from around the world to people. When Bulk and Skull arrive, they turn the peaceful fair into a full-on food fight which infuriates Mr. Caplan. Rita, who can't stomach the sight of food, is inspired by this madness and generates Pudgy Pig, a wicked pig monster that is always hungry. Pudgy Pig will deplete the entire world of its food supply in 48 hours unless the Rangers can thwart him. The Rangers battle the pig, but problems arise when the villain eats their Power Weapons. They soon discover Pudgy Pig has a bad reaction to spicy food and use that to their advantage.
7	7	"Big Sisters"	Jeff Reiner	Gary Glasberg & Shuki Levy	September 30, 1993	107
Kimberly and Trini become "big sisters" to a mischievous little girl named Maria. At her palace, Rita discovers a chest containing the Power Eggs, magic eggs with the power to conquer all. None of Rita's henchmen can open it. Nor can Rita. It is discovered that only the innocence of a child will release the eggs. Rita has the Putty Patrollers kidnap Maria, with the intent of using her to open the chest. The Rangers face Chunky Chicken to save her. All of this, plus, Billy unveils his specially modified Volkswagen Beetle which he calls the RADBUG.
8	8	"I, Eye Guy"	David Blyth	Stewart St. John	September 14, 1993	109
Billy's young protege Willy has created his best invention yet: a hologame which he enters into a science fair. Bulk and Skull happen upon the science fair and cause trouble. While the teens resolve the situation somewhat humorously, the commotion leads Willie to be disqualified by the professor overseeing the science fair. When Billy states that what happened was not Willy's fault, the professor states that his decision is final. Disheartened, Willy flees. At the park, he is kidnapped by Eye Guy, a multi-eyed monster who plans to steal his vast intelligence. The teens morph into action, but soon find out Eye Guy will not be easily defeated. Even the combined Power Blaster cannot destroy him. The Rangers call the Zords to save Willie and defeat Eye Guy. At the juice bar Willy was able to get over being disqualified until the teens see Ernie and the professor experience the hologame. The professor was so impressed he decides to revoke Willy's disqualification and award him first prize.
9	9	"For Whom the Bell Trolls"	Robert Hughes	Jeff Deckman & Ronnie Sperling and Stewart St. John	September 15, 1993	111
Trini brings her favorite doll, a troll/elf hybrid named Mr. Ticklesneezer, to Angel Grove High for Hobby Week. This catches the eye of Rita, who has the doll stolen and turned into a real monster. Ticklesneezer goes around shrinking everything, from buildings to trains, even Billy and Trini, and collecting them in bottles. Can the Rangers rescue their friends and bring an end to this nightmare?
10	10	"Happy Birthday, Zack"	Jeff Reiner	Stewart St. John	September 16, 1993	112
The Rangers and Ernie plan a surprise party at the Juice Bar for Zack. The secrecy leads him to believe that they have forgotten his birthday. Rita shows that she cares--about seeing to it that he never again lives to celebrate another, that is--by sending down a special treat, a vicious black-armored monster known as Knasty Knight. Zack soon finds out he is way over his head; Happy Birthday indeed.
11	11	"No Clowning Around"	Adrian Carr	Mark Hoffmeier	September 17, 1993	113
The Rangers attend a fair at Angel Grove Park with Trini's cousin Sylvia. One particular clown named Pineapple lures Sylvia away from Trini when she is not looking. When Trini catches up with Sylvia, she witnesses Pineapple the Clown turn Sylvia into a cardboard cutout. The fair proves to be a trap for the Rangers as they find out when the Putty Patrollers arrives. Trini takes Sylvia to Billy's lab to return Sylvia to normal. When the Putties are dealt with, the Rangers confront Pineapple who reveals himself as Finster's latest creation Pineoctopus.
12	12	"Power Ranger Punks"	David Blyth	Mark Hoffmeier	September 20, 1993	121
The gang is playing volleyball when Baboo appears above the field. Without being noticed, he slips an odd potion into their water glasses. Kimberly and Billy drink the water and start acting like real punks. Rita plots to use the divided Rangers to allow her latest monster the Terror Toad to destroy the town. Alpha must journey to another dimension to find a unique singing squash as only its juice can restore Billy and Kimberly to their right minds. Alpha must hurry as the Terror Toad devours Trini and Zack, leaving Jason to fight the monster alone.
13	13	"Peace, Love and Woe"	Robert Hughes	Julianne Klemm	September 21, 1993	128
The teens are preparing for the school dance, and everyone has a date except Billy. He then bumps into a brainy girl named Marge, and the two hit it off immediately. But Rita's ally Madame Woe mistakes Marge for a Ranger and captures her. The actual Rangers come to her rescue, but can they save her, or will Billy remain dateless for the upcoming dance? Meanwhile, after Bulk crashes into the cake for the dance, he and Skull use disguises to sneak into the Youth Center to keep a low profile, but Ernie quickly catches them and they are forced to pay for the cake if they want to return.
14	14	"Foul Play in the Sky"	Shuki Levy	Shuki Levy	September 22, 1993	110
Kimberly goes flying with her pilot uncle Steve with Bulk and Skull tagging along. Rita's henchman Squatt spikes Steve's drink with a sleeping potion which kicks into effect while in the skies over Angel Grove. Kimberly nervously takes over flying the four-seater plane, but even with a little guidance from Alpha 5, can she land safely? Meanwhile, her teammates face the dreaded Snizzard. To make matters worse, Kimberly's Power Bow is the only means of destroying Snizzard. Notes: An uncredited Bryan Cranston (later of Breaking Bad and Malcolm in the Middle fame) guest stars as Snizzard.
15	15	"Dark Warrior"	Terence H. Winkless	Jeff Deckman & Ronnie Sperling and Mark Hoffmeier	September 28, 1993	129
Fed up with being picked on by the likes of Bulk and Skull, Billy decides to re-enroll in Jason's karate class. Meanwhile, Trini's uncle, Howard – a scientist and experienced martial artist – arrives to visit. Rita is more interested in Howard's new invisibility formula and sends Putties to kidnap Trini's uncle and hold him for ransom. Rita's latest monster, the ninja-like Dark Warrior, is dispatched to fight the Ranger teens.
16	16	"Switching Places"	Jeff Reiner	Shuki Levy & Steve Kramer	October 4, 1993	108
Billy has invented a machine that reads minds which he tests out on himself and Kimberly. Unknown to him; however, Squatt has tampered with the device, and as a result, Kimberly and Billy's minds are swapped, driving the two at each other's throats. Rita sends down a jackal-headed Genie from a lamp that Squatt and Baboo found on the planet Kanyn 4 to further complicate things. With Kimberly and Billy's minds boggled, how can they work as a team to bottle up this fiend? In A B-Story, Bulk and Skull attempt to exploit Billy's mind-reading machine, but their minds switch as well.
17	17	"Green with Evil"	Robert Hughes	Gary Glasberg & Stewart St. John	October 5, 1993	114
18	18	"Green with Evil"	Robert Hughes	Tom Wyner & Cheryl Saban and Stewart St. John	October 6, 1993	115
19	19	"Green with Evil"	Robert Hughes	Mark Ryan & Stewart St. John	October 7, 1993	116
20	20	"Green with Evil"	Robert Hughes	Cindy McKay & Stewart St. John	October 8, 1993	117
21	21	"Green with Evil"	Robert Hughes	Gary Glasberg & Stewart St. John	October 9, 1993	118
Part 1 – Out of Control: The new kid in town, Tommy Oliver, has martial arts skills that rival Jason's, as the two compete in a karate sparring match that ends in a draw. This catches Rita's eye, and she prepares her master plan to destroy the Power Rangers once and for all. She kidnaps Tommy, puts him under her spell, and by giving him a power coin, transforms him into the Evil Green Ranger. After infiltrating the Command Center and disabling Alpha and Zordon, Tommy beats the Rangers in battle, sending them to retreat back to their damaged headquarters. Part 2 – Jason's Battle: With the Command Center still incapacitated from the Green Ranger's attack, and reeling from their first real defeat, Billy and Trini attempt to restore operations with Zordon to learn some answers about their mysterious foe. Meanwhile, Rita gives Tommy the Sword of Darkness, which acts as a catalyst for keeping him under her spell permanently. After he meets with Jason, Tommy teleports him to the Dark Dimension. Trapped, with no way out, no way of morphing, and no way of contacting his teammates, Jason faces Goldar alone. Back on Earth, the remaining Rangers face the Green Ranger again. Part 3 – The Rescue: Jason continues his struggle with Goldar in the Dark Dimension, and eventually, the Green Ranger as well. Luckily, in the nick of time, Billy locks onto his signal and teleports him to safety. But with Zordon still lost, the victory is bittersweet. Rita then summons Scorpina, a female scorpion-themed warrior with a powerful sting. Scorpina fights the Rangers, but is recalled by Rita as she reveals her master plan for permanently ridding the Rangers of their Zords, beginning with deploying a fully-grown Goldar to lure the Rangers out. Part 4 – Eclipsing Megazord: Watching Goldar demolish the city via the viewing globe, the Rangers have no choice but to morph and activate Megazord, falling for Rita's plan. A spell eclipses the sun and cuts off Megazord's solar power reserves. Using her magic wand, Rita grows Scorpina and, soon after, the Green Ranger. The Megazord soon falls to the evil trio. The Zords separate and scatter into a fiery chasm opened by Rita. With their fighting spirit diminished, the Rangers return to the Command Center, where the true identity of the Green Ranger is revealed. Part 5 – Breaking the Spell: Tommy is revealed to be the Green Ranger, and Jason plans to break the spell holding him under Rita's control. Her endgame now realized, Rita brings forth the ancient Dragonzord from Angel Grove bay. It begins to rampage through the city, while the helpless Rangers watch the destruction unfold. Zordon's transmission is finally reestablished. The Megazord is recovered and victoriously faces the Dragonzord. With the Zord incapacitated, Jason defeats Tommy in a climactic swordfight before the latter uses his powers to become the sixth Ranger on the Power Rangers team, having been freed from Rita's control.
22	22	"The Trouble with Shellshock"	David Blyth	Stewart St. John & Julianne Klemm	October 11, 1993	119
On the Moon while Rita naps, Baboo and Squatt take charge by using Finster's Monstermatic to create a monster, a tortoise with a stoplight on his back named Shellshock. This monster proves to be a terrible menace to the Rangers and uses his "go" beam to put Trini in perpetual motion, speeding her away. Flashing his "stop" beam freezes Billy, Zack, and Kimberly, leaving Jason to stop Shellshock. Fortunately, he is not alone as newcomer Tommy and his Dragonzord join the fight.
23	23	"Itsy Bitsy Spider"	Robert Hughes	Steve Kramer	October 19, 1993	120
Trini and Billy petition to save the Forest Spirit Statue from demolition. It supposedly protects the woods from nasty bug infestations. Rita swipes the statue and replaces it with a lookalike, which hides her Spidertron monster. Zack brings his young Hip-Hop Kido class to the park to work out nearby, and all but Zack are put under a sleeping spell by the tarantula-like Spidertron, who soon reveals himself. Alas for Zack, he has a deathly fear of bugs, especially spiders. The Rangers morph and the eight-legged menace grows. This results in the need to employ the Dragonzord Battle Mode combination for this fight.
24	24	"The Spit Flower"	David Blyth	Peggy Nicoll	October 13, 1993	122
Kimberly designs a flower float for the big Angel Grove parade. But Putties drop by the Juice Bar and trash it before she can turn the design in. Kimberly soon has to face the evil flesh-eating, blossom-spewing Spitflower monster. To make matters worse, the Rangers' Zords fail in stomping it, and even Tommy's powerful Dragonzord is useless in wilting this flower.
25	25	"Life's a Masquerade"	Robert Hughes	Cheryl Saban	October 30, 1993	123
A costume party is in progress at the Youth Center. Rita uses this distraction to mine a special clay on Earth, from which she plans to create Super Putties. She sends her own version of the Frankenstein Monster to the party, and he is immediately mistaken for Tommy. Billy, dressed as Sherlock Holmes, investigates and finds that Franken is no Tommy. This means that the time has come to morph. Meanwhile, Bulk and Skull try to figure out what to dress up as for the costume party. After Frankenstein's Monster is destroyed, Tommy actually shows up at the costume contest as Frankenstein's Monster.
26	26	"Gung Ho!"	Robert Hughes	Mark Hoffmeier	November 4, 1993	124
Jason and Tommy team-up for an upcoming Team Ninja competition at the Youth Center. However, they have trouble working together, as both are used to sparring one-on-one. Rita unleashes the Super Putties. As the other Rangers fight the nigh-invincible clay soldiers, Zordon sends Jason and Tommy to retrieve new weapons. They face a strange creature known as Titanus, and must learn teamwork in the face of adversity...or both of them will be killed.
27	27	"Wheel of Misfortune"	Terence H. Winkless	Mark Ryan & Cheryl Saban	November 5, 1993	127
The Rangers are involved with a play of Rumpelstiltskin at Angel Grove High. An antique spinning wheel that had belonged to Kimberly's grandmother is used as a prop, which is accidentally broken by Bulk and leaves it in a position to be captured by Rita's goons, who turn it into the evil Wheel of Misfortune. The Rangers have to bring a stop to the giant wheel without ruining Kimberly's family heirloom.
28	28	"Island of Illusion"	Terence H. Winkless	Chris Schoon & Shuki Levy	November 8, 1993	125
29	29	"Island of Illusion"	Terence H. Winkless	Stewart St. John & Chris Schoon and Shuki Levy	November 9, 1993	126
Part 1: Before an upcoming dance competition, Zack, despite his usual smooth moves, has a massive case of self-doubt. Rita is inspired and aims to send the six Rangers to her very own transdimensional island, where a person's worst fears become a reality. She summons the celestial being Lokar and his wicked zombie-like Mutitus creature, either the Megazord has to prove to be a match or the Rangers will be island-bound even when Mutitus assumes a Chinese dragon-resembling form. Part 2: Trapped on the strange Island of Illusion, each of the Rangers comes face to face with their own worst fears. The island's only inhabitant, an elf named Quagmire, appears and offers them rhyming reminders of self-confidence, but whether he is friend or foe is not immediately apparent. Even if they can get off the island, the team will still have to face a second round against Mutitus...and they may not last that second round.
30	30	"The Rockstar"	Terence H. Winkless	Peggy Nicoll	November 10, 1993	130
Jason and his young cousin Jeremy become embroiled in a plot by Rita and Scorpina to capture the powerful Mirror of Destruction, while Zack takes the others on a driving trip outside Angel Grove. The rock golem-themed Rockstar monster rounds out the cast. Jason is pummeled to the ground by this lobbing rock, and the others are recalled from vacation to rescue him. Jeremy finds the mirror, and, to his amazement, he finds that it can shatter Putties. This, however, also makes him a target for Scorpina. Notes: An uncredited Richard Lee Jackson (of Saved by the Bell fame) guest stars as Jeremy; Jackson was also dubbed for this role.
31	31	"Calamity Kimberly"	Terence H. Winkless	Tom Wyner & Julianne Klemm	November 11, 1993	131
Kimberly wakes up on the wrong side of the bed and begins to have a terrible day. It becomes worse when Rita sends the Samurai Fan Man to Earth. He traps the bad-haired, ratty-clothed, annoyed Kimberly inside an urn, connected to another dimension. The Rangers race against the clock to free her before she is permanently lost inside it.
32	32	"A Star is Born"	Terence H. Winkless	Cheryl Saban	November 15, 1993	132
While Tommy is competing with Bulk for a role in a Karate commercial, the other Rangers take to the beach for some fun in the sun. Rita takes a day off, leaving Goldar to send a double threat: the cocooning menace of Scorpina's pet Weaveworm and the baseball-fevered Babe Ruthless.
33	33	"The Yolk's on You!"	Terence H. Winkless	Cheryl Saban	November 16, 1993	133
Finster creates the Fang monster for Rita's birthday. The new beast becomes enraged, however, when Baboo and Squatt eat his delicious rare "Gooney Bird" eggs. Goldar lies to Fang, pinning the blame on the Rangers, turning his anger toward them, and it is no certainty whether they stand a chance without Tommy, whom Putties captured while he was on the way to Angel Grove High's big talent show.
34	34	"The Green Candle"	Robert Hughes	Mark McKain & Stewart St. John	November 17, 1993	134
35	35	"The Green Candle"	Robert Hughes	Gary Glasberg & Stewart St. John	November 18, 1993	135
Part 1: Rita plans to use a magic candle, which, once burned out, will drain Tommy of the Green Ranger powers. Goldar kidnaps Tommy and holds him in the Dark Dimension. The other Rangers arrive at the Command Center, trying to devise a plan to rescue Tommy. However, a monster in disguise as Dragonzord called the Cyclops becomes the focus of their attention. They battle the impostor. Meanwhile, Tommy manages to escape and calls for the real Dragonzord, and the monster escapes. Back at the Command Center, Zordon explains the whole situation to the Rangers. While still under her spell, Tommy came into contact with the wax. Once the candle burns out, his powers will return to Rita. Part 2: Zordon explains that someone must enter the Dark Dimension and retrieve the candle if they are to save Tommy's powers and Jason volunteers. With Billy's help, Alpha discovers a doorway between dimensions. The Rangers find the location and set up a device to open the door, Jason enters and encounters Goldar. Rita sends the Cyclops back to Earth to lure Tommy out. With the Rangers detained, Tommy battles the one-eyed giant himself, and in his weakened state, he is soon overpowered. Jason is forced to abandon the collection of the candle, and the Rangers morph to Tommy's aid. The Rangers succeed in destroying Cyclops, but the victory is bittersweet as the candle has burned out. Though Zordon had Jason evoke a loophole to keep Rita from getting the Green Ranger's powers back.
36	36	"Birds of a Feather"	Robert Hughes	Julianne Klemm	November 22, 1993	136
Rita sends down the deadly 40-story-tall Hatchasaurus, commanded by Cardiotron. The Dinozord manages to defeat this large bird/dinosaur/mountain hybrid. But he reforms, and in reforming, he becomes more deadly, easily trashing the Megazord. To make matters worse, Rita also casts a binding spell on Dragonzord, disabling it. Jason decides to confront Cardiotron by jumping inside the Hatchasaurus. Now possessing the Dragon Coin and by calling for the Dragon Shield and Dagger, Jason armors up and attempts to break the hold over Tommy's former zord. Bulk and Skull attempt to use Biff to intimidate Kameron at a karate tournament, but the boy learns a valuable lesson in respect and being a good sport. Notes: An uncredited Farrand Thompson (of V.R. Troopers fame) guest stars as Biff.
37	37	"Clean-Up Club"	Terence H. Winkless	Mark Hoffmeier	November 23, 1993	137
Angel Grove City is polluted, and so the Rangers come together to form a Clean-Up Club. Rita decides to end the Rangers' plight and releases the Polluticorn. Jason uses the Dragon Shield in defeating this mythical terror. Skull attempts to film Bulk in a positive light but ends up embarrassing him in front of their class after watching their tape.
38	38	"A Bad Reflection on You"	Robert Hughes	Peggy Nicoll	November 27, 1993	138
Rita sends Twin Man and four Putty Patrollers to impersonate the Rangers in both of their forms to Angel Grove. Once there, the doppelgängers cause trouble and our heroes are sent to detention by Mr. Caplan. With the real Rangers in detention with Bulk and Skull, their doubles are free to wreak havoc and frame the Rangers even further. Notes: An uncredited Bryan Cranston (later of Breaking Bad and Malcolm in the Middle fame) guest stars as Twin Man.
39	39	"Doomsday"	Terence H. Winkless	Stewart St. John	November 29, 1993	139
40	40	"Doomsday"	Terence H. Winkless	Stewart St. John	November 30, 1993	140
Part 1: Angel Grove is hosting a celebration in the park called Power Ranger Day, honoring the superheroes. The teens plan to make an appearance, but before they can morph, Rita abducts Angel Grove's citizens, relocates her palace to Earth, and launches a new attack using a War Zord called Cyclopsis with Goldar piloting. The Rangers summon the Zords, but Cyclopsis proves to be a tough opponent, and Megazord is soon struggling; calling for the Ultrazord, the Rangers destroy Cyclopsis. However, Rita deals a savage blow by burying Titanus and then summons Lokar to rebuild Goldar's war machine. Up and running, Cyclopsis is stronger than ever, and with the Zords damaged, things look bad. Part 2: Cyclopsis continues to wreak havoc in Angel Grove, and the Rangers' Zords are only at half power. Nonetheless, they return to the battlefield. Cyclopsis proves too much and severely damages both Megazord and Dragonzord. Rita delivers a significant surge of energy from her wand, and both zords fade away. Although this is a safety measure to prevent the zords' destruction, the teens are still in full retreat. They fall back to Billy's lab to regroup, where Goldar greets them. After trashing Billy's garage, the teens scramble to the Command Center, where Alpha 5 has some exciting news about the War Zord's main weakness. Tommy returns in a cameo at the end of the episode.
41	41	"Rita's Seed of Evil"	Robert Hughes	Stewart St. John	February 7, 1994	143
For a school project, the Rangers spend the afternoon planting trees in the park. But Rita has some seeds of her own and sends Squatt down to plant her latest monster, the Octoplant. Jason returns to the park to investigate, but the vines of this latest creation soon have him tangled. Bulk and Skull attempt to remove the trees the Rangers planted and move them elsewhere, but goes awry, and they spend a day being stuck inside a portable toilet.
42	42	"A Pig Surprise"	Robert Hughes	Shuki Levy & Douglas Sloan	February 8, 1994	141
Our heroes spearhead a drive to find homes for stray animals, including an old lady's pig named Norman. But Norman is no ordinary pig. At Rita's command, he transforms into the infamous Pudgy Pig--an enemy whom the Rangers fought before. Now the Power Rangers have to stop the reborn Pudgy Pig without harming Norman. They soon discover that the newly made Pudgy Pig has a soft spot for other pigs. Bulk and Skull attempt to take on raising Norman themselves, but after a frightening encounter with Pudgy Pig, they both find themselves scared of pigs.
43	43	"Something Fishy"	Robert Hughes	Cheryl Saban	February 9, 1994	145
Jason, Trini, and Zack are looking forward to their scuba diving trip, but Billy refuses to accompany them, as he has a massive fear of fish. Kimberly stays behind to keep him company. Rita decides to use Billy's fear to her advantage and tells Finster to send down the Goo Fish. With the other Rangers down under, Billy has to learn to control his fear if he is to can this fish.
44	44	"Lions & Blizzards"	Robert Hughes	Shell Danielson	February 10, 1994	142
The Rangers and their friends win the grand prize at the annual Oddball Games: the Noble Lion Trophy. Rita and Goldar plot to transform the trophy into a Chimera monster called Goatan the Storm-Bringer, whose abilities are summoning disasterous storms. Meanwhile, Zack has a date with his long-time crush Angela, leaving only four Rangers to deal with this illusion. Bulk and Skull steal the Noble Lion Trophy for themselves, but end up being scared off by Goatan's creation and later caught by the Angel Grove PD.
45	45	"Crystal of Nightmares"	Robert Hughes	Shuki Levy & Douglas Sloan	February 14, 1994	144
In preparation for a big upcoming exam overseen by Mr. Caplan, the Rangers plan to cram together at a remote cabin owned by Billy's uncle. Rita plans to activate the Crystal of Nightmares, thus breaking the Rangers' self-confidence. While they sleep, Goldar is sent to Earth with the Nightmare Crystal, which also works on Bulk and Skull, unaware that they were present in the cabin; the bullies dream about becoming Power Rangers, whose hilarious efforts to pilot the Megazord destroy most of Angel Grove. Will the real Rangers' own nightmares finish them off as well? Bulk and Skull attempt to cheat on their test from the Rangers, but wind up with Fs...and extended periods of detention in Mr. Caplan's office.
46	46	"To Flea or Not to Flee"	Terence H. Winkless	Douglas Sloan	February 15, 1994	146
The Juice Bar is in trouble and the kids' rally to help Ernie. Meanwhile, Finster makes the fierce Fighting Flea and plants it on a lost dog as well as Jason. Bulk and Skull manage to steal the lost dog from Jason, but find themselves affected by the fleas and are forced to wear dog collars for a week.
47	47	"Reign of the Jellyfish"	Terence H. Winkless	Stewart St. John	February 16, 1994	147
The kids of Angel Grove High prepare a time capsule for future citizens. But Squatt and Baboo try and steal the capsule for Rita. Rita sends the Jellyfish Warrior to challenge our heroes. With its dimension-warping umbrella and corrosive acid spray, this Jellyfish proves to be the utmost terror.
48	48	"Plague of the Mantis"	Terence H. Winkless	Mark Hoffmeier	February 17, 1994	148
While Trini learns Praying Mantis Kung-Fu from Master Li, Rita sends down the mighty Mantis monster to challenge Trini's new skills. Bulk and Skull attempt to market their own martial art, "Cockroach Kung-Fu", but hardly with the anticipated results. Notes: An uncredited Richard Rabago (of V.R. Troopers fame) guest stars as Master Li, Trini's kung-fu instructor.
49	49	"Return of an Old Friend"	Worth Keeter	Shell Danielson	February 28, 1994	149
50	50	"Return of an Old Friend"	Worth Keeter	Shell Danielson	March 1, 1994	150
Part 1: At the Youth Center, everyone celebrates Parents' Day, including the Rangers' parents. Rita has a brilliant scheme: trap the parents in her Dark Dimension and hypnotize Billy to steal the Dragon Dagger from the Command Center. He gives it to Goldar and makes the Rangers choose between their parents and their Power Coins. But Goldar double-crosses them and teleports away. When everything seems hopeless, Jason pulls out the Green Power Coin and reveals his own deception. Part 2: Tommy arrives at the Youth Center but is puzzled to find it empty. He is then teleported to the Command Center, and Zordon plans to re-energize the Dragon Coin to bring the Green Ranger back. The transfer is successful, and Tommy confronts Goldar and retrieves the five power coins. The Power Rangers, back in action with Tommy by their side once again, face the latest of Finster's creations Dramole.
51	51	"Grumble Bee"	John Stewart	Cheryl Saban	April 28, 1994	151
Billy is shocked when he gets his first B ever. This gives Rita an idea: she sends Putties to trap some of the Rangers, leaving Billy and Trini to fight the ominous Grumble Bee.
52	52	"Two Heads Are Better Than One"	John Stewart	Mark Hoffmeier	April 29, 1994	152
Jason and Tommy are teaching self-defense classes to mothers in Angel Grove. Rita sees that they work well as a team when they put their heads together, so Finster makes a Two-Headed Parrot monster. The Rangers are disappointed when they find that this creature is nearly invincible, realizing that the only way to defeat it was to turn the 2 heads of the monster against each other. Billy points out that since parrots like fruit, they could use that against the Two-Headed Parrot. All but Tommy distract the monster while he seeks a specific kind of fruit. Furious, Rita sends Putties to steal all the fruit in the area. A desperate Tommy must think quickly to find a solution before time runs out. Fortunately, Ernie has a specific type of fruit that Tommy needs to distract the Two-Headed Parrot.
53	53	"Fowl Play"	John Stewart	Peggy Nicoll	May 2, 1994	153
Zack helps out by teaching magic to some day-camp kids, which works a bit of magic on Angela. But Rita makes some magic of her own and creates the Peckster to terrorize the city.
54	54	"Trick or Treat"	Worth Keeter	Daniel J. Sarnoff & Ellen Levy-Sarnoff	May 3, 1994	155
Kimberly is chosen to compete against Skull on the hottest TV game show in Angel Grove. Things go well for her until Rita starts a new offensive, and the Rangers are called into action. This time they face the Pumpkin Rapper, a hip-hopping terror planted by Squatt and Baboo who takes our heroes to the end of their rope.
55	55	"Second Chance"	Worth Keeter	Mark Litton	May 4, 1994	157
Jason and Zack help Roger practice for a soccer team and are finding it challenging to teach the discouraged boy. To "help" Roger, Rita sends the Soccadillo monster to attack them in the park. Meanwhile, Tommy's communicator is taken from him by Ms. Appleby, making it impossible to reach him.
56	56	"On Fins and Needles"	Worth Keeter	Douglas Sloan	May 5, 1994	156
Jason and Tommy volunteer to teach kids the value of teamwork and martial arts. But their teamwork is undermined as Rita casts a spell that turns them against each other. Rita sends down the Slippery Shark to split the Rangers up permanently.
57	57	"Enter... The Lizzinator"	Worth Keeter	Stewart St. John	May 6, 1994	154
Kimberly helps her young cousin Kelly try to make the junior high cheerleading squad. But Rita plans to use Kelly to lure the Rangers into a battle with the muscular Lizzinator by having Squatt and Baboo kidnap her.
58	58	"Football Season"	Terence H. Winkless	Cheryl Saban	May 9, 1994	158
Tommy wants to try out for football but knows nothing of it. Ernie teaches Tommy how to play and helps him train for tryouts, but Tommy can't seem to get the hang of it. Rita decides to help him in the form of Rhinoblaster and some Putties that imprison all the Rangers but him. Knowing that his powers will not last much longer, he challenges the monster, but to no avail. Zordon tells him what he must do to release the Rangers, but this is easier said than done. In the end, Jason, Billy, and Zack make the football team, along with Tommy as the star quarterback.
59	59	"Mighty Morphin' Mutants"	Terence H. Winkless	Douglas Sloan	May 16, 1994	159
Rita plans to use the badges of darkness to turn some Putties into Mutant Rangers. Goldar trains six of them at the beach. Five of them pass, but the sixth fails miserably and is sent back into Finster's clay pot. The other five Putties become the Black, Blue, Yellow, Pink, and Green Rangers. Since no one is worthy enough to become a Red Ranger, Rita has Finster create a leader named Commander Crayfish. The Rangers have faced doppelgängers before; however, as Kimberly and Tommy soon find out, this will be no walk in the park.
60	60	"An Oyster Stew"	Terence H. Winkless	Shell Danielson	May 23, 1994	160
Zack is so madly infatuated with Angela that he wants to impress her with a pair of pearl earrings but can find none that are affordable. Just when he gives up, an unexpected opportunity presents him with precisely what he sought. Little does he know that Rita has plans for his date with Angela, especially when the earrings cast a spell on all but Tommy and Zack. Both must face the Oysterizer, who shoots acidic goo from his stomach.

=== Season 2 (1994–95) ===
No. overall	No. in season	Title	Directed by	Written by	Original release date	Prod. code	U.S. viewers (millions)
61	1	"The Mutiny"	Shuki Levy	Shuki Levy & Shell Danielson	July 21, 1994	201	12.2
62	2	"The Mutiny"	Shuki Levy	Shuki Levy & Shell Danielson	July 29, 1994	202	7.2
63	3	"The Mutiny"	Shuki Levy	Shuki Levy & Shell Danielson	August 5, 1994	203	8.2
Part 1: Lord Zedd is introduced as the new arch-enemy of the Power Rangers. Angered by Rita's failures, Zedd returns to accomplish what she could not: destroy the Power Rangers. First, he removes her powers, imprisons her in the Dumpster again, and sets about to finally defeat the Rangers by creating a stronger Putty Patrol who bare Zedd's "Z" emblem on their chests, which the Rangers learn are their weaknesses, and a new monster Pirantishead which Lord Zedd creates from a piranha. Zordon warns the Rangers about him and states that any monster created by Lord Zedd is stronger than the ones that Rita has Finster make. Pirantishead sets out to immobilize the Dinozords. Not only this, but Bulk and Skull begin their quest to find out the true identities of the Power Rangers. Part 2: The Rangers' problems are further jeopardized when the Tyrannosaurus and the Dragonzord both turn on them and begin to wreak havoc. Responding to Zedd's return, Zordon unveils the more powerful Thunderzords. Only two problems remain. The Rangers must regain control of the Dinozords before activating the new ones, and due to Tommy's weakening powers, he is forced to retain the Dragonzord. Billy thinks he may have the answer, and along with Trini, retreats to his lab while the others return to the battlefield to confront Pirantishead, who has just reactivated the Zords. Bulk and Skull separate in their attempt to find the race track but find themselves at the wrong end of Pirantishead's flute when he takes control of their Quads. Part 3: The Rangers regain control of their Zords, thanks to Billy's newest invention, but Lord Zedd responds by using the powers of his staff to open up the Earth which proceeds to engulf the Dinozords. Tommy manages to return the Dragonzord to the sea before Zedd can react. However, Zordon and Alpha 5 succeed in salvaging the Dinozords and using the Power of Thunder, transform them into the powerful Thunderzords. Our heroes then combine the new zords into the Thunder Megazord and finish off Pirantishead once and for all.
64	4	"The Wanna-Be Ranger"	John Stewart	Ellen Levy-Sarnoff & Daniel J. Sarnoff	September 13, 1994	204	N/A
Zordon informs the Rangers that he's going to shut down temporarily, leaving Alpha 5 to keep an eye on things. A bored Alpha checks things out and sees a little boy named Dylan who needs help finding his mother and goes to the park to befriend him since he can't reach the Rangers. Lord Zedd takes advantage of the situation to create Primator, a shape-shifting white baboon/ape monster, from Zack's white gorilla costume. Primator attacks Alpha and Dylan after seeing through Primator's disguise. Panicking, Alpha orders Dylan to run to safety and turns on his self-destruct sequence so that Primator can't use him to find the Command Center. Primator sets up some of the Rangers, so they get attacked by Putties. Baffled and unable to contact Alpha, the Rangers go to the Command Center, where Zordon is restored. Zordon enlightens the Rangers to Alpha's predicament and reveals that they have mere minutes to save him. They're forced to take on Primator first, and he's not making things easy, especially when he begins to imitate the Rangers so that they can't tell him apart from each Ranger he impersonates. The Rangers can't seem to be able to outsmart him, so Zordon explains a clue he discovered that might be useful. The Rangers teleport out and are separated. Billy uses what they learned to sort the Primator from the Rangers. Will they be able to defeat him in time to help Alpha before it's too late?
65	5	"Putty on the Brain"	John Stewart	Mark Litton	September 14, 1994	205	N/A
Zedd launches a diabolical scheme when he creates a spell that causes Billy and Zack to see their friends as Putties with one instance having them get in trouble with Mr. Caplan. With two Rangers confused, Zedd creates Saliguana from Ms. Appleby's pet iguana and begins a new assault against our heroes. However, Alpha comes up with a temporary solution for Billy and Zack's dilemma, have their friends morph to keep their confusion at bay until he can free their visions from Zedd's spell. Bulk and Skull try a new attempt in finding the identities of the Power Rangers but wind up spending the day in detention.
66	6	"Bloom of Doom"	John Stewart	Cheryl Saban	September 17, 1994	206	N/A
It's Club Sign-Up Day at Angel Grove High and Trini and Kimberly each set up a booth at which people can sign up to join their respective clubs. No one joins Kimberly's club, but everyone likes Trini's, which makes Kimberly disappointed and a little jealous. Lord Zedd takes advantage of this by casting a spell on her to turn her against Trini. Zedd then creates the Bloom of Doom from a nearby flower patch. Bloom of Doom captures Kimberly and traps her in a mysterious dimension. However, the Rangers think fast and help Kimberly.
67	7	"The Green Dream"	John Stewart	Stewart St. John	September 19, 1994	210	N/A
Tommy is troubled by a recurring dream about losing his powers. Little does he know that Zedd is behind his nightmares. It's part of his plan to capture Tommy and steal the Sword of Power (which was reforged from the Sword of Darkness) that involves bringing to life the monster Robogoat from its entry in the "Myths and Legends" book that Tommy was returning to the library.
68	8	"The Power Stealer"	Terence H. Winkless	Tony Oliver & Barbara A. Oliver	September 20, 1994	207	N/A
The Rangers lead a drive to clean up Angel Grove, but Lord Zedd has plans of his own and decides to create the Octophantom to capture the Rangers in a magic jar and drain them of their powers. Now, the Rangers face a battle to keep their powers and save Tommy. Before Zack, Trini, and Kimberly are captured, Billy discovers Octophantom's main weakness and creates an invention for Jason to use in exploiting his vanity.
69	9	"The Beetle Invasion"	Terence H. Winkless	Mark Hoffmeier	September 21, 1994	208	N/A
The Rangers step up to the challenge of a Broomball Tournament, but Zedd has a challenge of his own and creates the Stag Beetle from a drawing on a Stone Canyon broomball flyer so that he can steal the Green Ranger powers. Note: This was the last episode where Austin St. John (Jason/Red Ranger) and Walter Jones (Zack/Black Ranger) did ADR voiceovers for their characters in morphed form, although they continued to appear as their characters in new unmorphed scenes up to the episode "Opposites Attract". After "The Beetle Invasion", Jason and Zack in morphed form were voiced by uncredited actors up to the characters' departures in the episode "The Power Transfer: Part 2".
70	10	"Welcome to Venus Island"	Terence H. Winkless	Mark Hoffmeier	September 24, 1994	209	N/A
Lord Zedd sets his sights on Trini's neighbor Haley and captures her. When they come to save her, Lord Zedd plans to ransom her for the Green Ranger. The Rangers must find their way to Venus Island and take on the Invenusable Flytrap which Lord Zedd created from a Venus flytrap. Bulk and Skull attempt to extract information from Haley concerning the identities of the Power Rangers to no avail. Note: This was the last episode where Thuy Trang did ADR voiceovers for her character in morphed form, although she continued to appear as her character in new unmorphed scenes up to the episode "Opposites Attract". After "Welcome to Venus Island", Trini in morphed form was voiced by an uncredited actress up to the character's departure in the episode "The Power Transfer: Part 2".
71	11	"The Song of Guitardo"	Terence H. Winkless	Shell Danielson & Shuki Levy	September 26, 1994	211	N/A
As Kimberly tries her hand at songwriting, Zedd decides to create a rock-and-roll nightmare. He creates Guitardo, a super cicada monster with a hypnotic sound. Bulk and Skull come up with a new plan to expose the Power Rangers' identities, but find themselves at the wrong hand of Guitardo.
72	12	"Green No More"	John Stewart	Stewart St. John	September 27, 1994	212	N/A
73	13	"Green No More"	John Stewart	Stewart St. John	September 28, 1994	213	N/A
Part 1: Tommy sees a vision of himself from the future that bears a grim warning. Meanwhile, Lord Zedd plans to get rid of the Green Ranger forever by creating Turbanshell from the shell that Kimberly found on the beach. He plans to use Turbanshell to drain him of his powers and transferring them into a crystal. The crystal, when fully energized, will bring about Zedd's Dark Rangers. The monster is more than the Rangers can handle; after retreating, they are shocked when Green Ranger suddenly disappears. Lord Zedd strips the other Rangers of their morphers, imprisons them in another dimension, and puts up an impermeable energy field around the Command Center. The Green Ranger is taken to the middle of nowhere and stripped of his powers, left utterly defenseless against the Turbanshell. Bulk and Skull find themselves intimidated by five teenage bullies that challenges the Rangers, who Zedd recruits as his new Dark Rangers. Part 2: Turbanshell and then Goldar taunt Tommy over the loss of his powers but are ultimately outsmarted. Tommy escapes, rescues his friends, and destroys the green crystal holding his powers before Lord Zedd can make use of the Dark Rangers. The Rangers, along with Tommy, morph summon the Thunder Megazord and challenge Turbanshell to a final fight. The monster bests the Megazord breaking it up into its five components, and the others helplessly watch as Jason fights solo. The Green Ranger, about to call Dragonzord, is stopped by Zordon. He explains to Tommy how to destroy the monster. With only one chance, Tommy, in what could be his final battle, weakens the beast from the inside. After defeating Turbanshell, the Dark Rangers are restored to normal with no memories of their past deeds, and Kimberly realizes they just need friends.
74	14	"Missing Green"	John Stewart	Ellen Levy-Sarnoff & Daniel J. Sarnoff	October 3, 1994	215	N/A
Jason feels responsible for Tommy's power loss by not retrieving the green candle. The other four decide to surprise Jason by bringing Tommy home. Goldar springs a trap; the four then morph, but Goldar easily transports the rangers to another dimension. His plan: strip them of their powers using candles similar to the one that Rita used to drain Tommy of his powers. Zordon informs Jason of his friend's peril, and he sets out to rescue them. Zedd uses the opportunity to destroy the Red Ranger and creates Pipebrain from a trophy. Can Jason destroy the Pipebrain, find the Rangers, and rescue them before it's too late?
75	15	"Orchestral Maneuvers in the Park"	Jerry P. Jacobs	Douglas Sloan	October 4, 1994	214	N/A
Zack's cousin Curtis is set to play in a jazz festival, and Zack lends him a special trumpet. The concert goes great until a Putty steals the trumpet as Zedd creates the terrifying Trumpet Top from it. He creates the illusions of Grumble, Saliguana, Fighting Flea, Soccadillo, Rhinoblaster, Mantis, Stag Beetle, and Slippery Shark to overwhelm the Rangers. Alpha can discern Trumpet Top's secret powers in hallucination to help the Rangers overcome him. Bulk and Skull witness the Rangers' fight against the illusions and plan to make a plaster cast of their footprints in the sand.
76	16	"Beauty and the Beast"	John Stewart	Cheryl Saban	October 10, 1994	216	N/A
Kimberly desperately misses Tommy. When she goes to a fortune teller for help, she is kidnapped by Goldar because Lord Zedd has decided to make her his new queen while creating Mirror Maniac from Kimberly's new mirror to keep the other Rangers at bay. However, Zedd makes his biggest mistake when Kimberly decides to impersonate Rita. Bulk and Skull decide to go to the same fortune-teller to assist them in exposing the Power Rangers until they discover that Ernie planned to teach them a lesson.
77	17	"White Light"	Jonathan Tzachor	Shuki Levy & Shell Danielson	October 17, 1994	217	N/A
78	18	"White Light"	Jonathan Tzachor	Shuki Levy & Shell Danielson	October 18, 1994	218	N/A
Part 1: Kimberly announces exciting news, Tommy's coming back. The Rangers are happy, but their joy is cut short when Lord Zedd creates the Scarlet Sentinel from the Sentinel Statue in Angel Grove Park as she overpowers them with the help of AC and DC. To make matters worse, Zordon and Alpha 5 disappear without a word. Billy heads to the Command Center and discovers the truth. Bulk and Skull find Rita's dumpster and believe it to be a sign to discover the Power Rangers' secret identities. Part 2: Billy reveals that Zordon and Alpha 5 are creating a new Ranger. The rest of the Rangers are unhappy because they'd rather have Tommy rejoin them. Jason and Billy remind them that Lord Zedd's monsters are a lot more powerful, and they need extra help. They are forced to wait and watch as the Scarlet Sentinel is destroying their beloved city. When Zordon and Alpha finally unveil the newest Ranger, the others are in for a shock. Bulk and Skull come close to unintentionally releasing Rita from her imprisonment until the Rangers show up to stop them.
79	19	"Two for One"	Jerry P. Jacobs	Douglas Sloan	October 24, 1994	219	N/A
A day at the park for Tommy and Kimberly turns into Putty pandemonium. While Kimberly and Tommy deal with Putties, Lord Zedd uses his evil powers to create two new outrageous monsters, Pursehead and Lypsyncher from Kimberly's purse and lipstick. Also, Bulk and Skull utilize their "Power Ranger detector" to try to discover the Rangers' secret identities.
80	20	"Opposites Attract"	Jerry P. Jacobs	Cheryl Saban	October 25, 1994	220	N/A
Billy falls head over heels for Kimberly's friend Laura but feels that he's not good enough and that they don't have anything in common. He is nearby gathering scientific data when Kimberly and Laura take some Angelettes for a hike in the woods. Billy discovers a severe storm is brewing, but Lord Zedd has plans of his own as he turns Billy's polarizer into the wicked Magnet Brain. Meanwhile, Kimberly and the Angelettes are unaware of the impending danger. Bulk and Skull find themselves in trouble upon facing Magnet Brain. Note: This was the last episode of Mighty Morphin Power Rangers where Austin St. John, Walter Jones and Thuy Trang appeared in newly recorded scenes. Although their characters Jason, Zack and Trini didn't depart in the series until "The Power Transfer: Part 2", any appearance that their characters make in unmorphed form in episodes after "Opposites Attract" is archive footage from past episodes.
81	21	"Zedd's Monster Mash"	Jerry P. Jacobs	Cheryl Saban	October 28, 1994	221	N/A
As the teens enjoy Halloween with some of their young friends, Lord Zedd instructs the Putties to crash the annual Youth Center Halloween Party. Then, as Tommy takes some kids trick-or-treating, Goldar kidnaps him and brings him to a secret Haunted to battle the most vicious Halloween monster Doomstone who ambushes them with a revived Pumpkin Rapper and Robogoat. By the time the Rangers catch up and fight Pumpkin Rapper and Robogoat, Doomstone takes this time to revive Primator, Rhinoblaster, Invenusable Flytrap, and Snizzard.
82	22	"The Ninja Encounter"	Shuki Levy	Shuki Levy & Shell Danielson	November 2, 1994	223	N/A
83	23	"The Ninja Encounter"	Shuki Levy	Shuki Levy & Shell Danielson	November 3, 1994	224	N/A
84	24	"The Ninja Encounter"	Shuki Levy	Shuki Levy & Shell Danielson	November 4, 1994	225	N/A
Part 1: The kids enjoy a day at the park and make some new friends: Rocky, Aisha, and Adam, who compete in and win the upcoming ninja competition at the Youth Center. But, Zedd has plans of his own for the ninja competitors. Part 2: Rocky, Aisha, Adam, and their teacher Mr. Anderson are still trapped. Goldar summons a snake which slowly slithers around them, and once it gets its grasp upon them the teens, it will remove their goodness & free will. Aisha attempts to pick her cuffs' lock with a hairpin, and succeeds only to have their escape thwarted. Trying to distract the Rangers from tracking them down, Lord Zedd creates Terror Blossom from some flower petals. In addition, he also revives Hatchasaurus and Cardiatron. Part 3: Tommy, Kimberly, and Billy must figure out how to unfreeze Jason, Zack, and Trini, defeat the Terror Blossom and Hatchasaurus, and save Rocky, Adam, and Aisha before they're turned to the dark side but may have to expose their secret identities to do so. Meanwhile, Bulk & Skull face the challenge of changing baby Jacob's diaper.
85	25	"A Monster of Global Proportions"	Jerry P. Jacobs	Douglas Sloan	November 5, 1994	226	N/A
The kids host a world teen summit at Angel Grove High. Zedd sends Goldar and the Putties to kidnap their international guests. To aid them, Zedd creates Four Head from an art sculpture.
86	26	"Zedd Waves"	Jerry P. Jacobs	Mark Litton	November 7, 1994	222	N/A
Angel Grove is hosting its annual triathlon. Rocky, Adam, and Aisha are competing, and the gang prepares to cheer them on. Meanwhile, Bulk and Skull have another harebrained scheme to discover the Rangers' identities: they'll sit in the lake during the triathlon's swimming portion and use Bulk's energy output meter to determine which swimmers are emitting the most force. Lord Zedd decides to combine the energy output meter with Skull's fishing pole to create the disc jockey-esque Beamcaster monster. Beamcaster uses the fishing pole to send out evil "Zedd waves" that brainwash everyone, turning Angel Grove's citizens into mindless drones that chant "Hail Lord Zedd" (or, in Skull's case, "Hail Lord Fred") repeatedly. As Beamcaster floods the park with his Zedd waves, Jason, Trini, and Zack morph and tries to thwart him, but they are hit with the waves as well. Billy invents a frequency reverser to undo the brainwashing effects, but upon teleporting to the park to use it, he and Kimberly are beset by the citizens, who damage the machine; Beamcaster uses the opportunity to bring them under his spell. The Zedd waves then trap Tommy, and Aisha, Rocky, and Adam arrive to realize the danger. Zordon teleports them to the Command Center for safety, where Aisha repairs the damaged reverser and uses it to free the Rangers' from Beamcaster's spell. The Rangers unite their Power Weapons to form the Power Blaster and take Beamcaster off the air for good.
87	27	"The Power Transfer"	Jonathan Tzachor	Judd Lynn	November 8, 1994	231	N/A
88	28	"The Power Transfer"	Jonathan Tzachor	Judd Lynn	November 9, 1994	232	N/A
Part 1: Jason, Trini, and Zack have been chosen as the three Angel Grove teens to attend the World Teen Peace Summit in Switzerland. They are delighted to be going but sad to leave their friends. Before they leave, however, they must complete one final mission: to recover the Sword of Light from the deserted city to transfer their powers to three new rangers. Jason, Trini, and Zack morph one last time, along with the others, and head for the deserted city. Meanwhile, Zedd has completed his new war machine, the Chinese dragon-like Serpentera, which he plans to use to destroy the Power Rangers and the world. He too heads for the deserted city, but leaves something behind on Earth: a device to put all of Angel Grove to sleep. Rocky, Adam, and Aisha have transferred to Angel Grove High and are in the middle of their first day when the other students begin to fall asleep. Zordon teleports them out just in time and sends them to destroy the device. They are ambushed by Putties, who tie them to a tree. At the deserted city, the Rangers search for the Sword of Light but are interrupted by Serpentera. Jason summons the Red Dragon Thunderzord and Tor, the new carrier zord, to hold Zedd off while the search continues. They find the sword but have trouble freeing it from the Statue. Part 2: Rocky, Adam, and Aisha free themselves and destroy the Putties and the sleeping device. Meanwhile, the Rangers release the Sword of Light when Billy links the Ring and the Statue just as Zedd destroys the city. Back at the Command Center, the Rangers inform Zordon that Serpentera proved fierce opposition, and Jason, Trini, and Zack announce that they plan to back out from the Peace Conference as they are needed as Rangers. Zordon tells them that their destiny lies outside the team now and as they succeeded in their final quest. The Rangers will continue with new Rangers in their place, and he presents them with the new Red, Black, and Yellow Rangers: Rocky, Adam, and Aisha. Using the Sword of Light, Tommy transfers the powers from Jason, Trini, and Zack, and the new Rangers appear morphed. Zordon thanks Jason, Zack, and Trini for their loyal service and wishes them well before they leave. Meanwhile, Zedd returns to Earth with Serpentera to attack. The new team goes into action and summons the Thunderzords. At first, Serpenterra proves to be tough, but it has a flaw. It loses energy very quickly and Zedd is forced to retreat. Back at the Command Center, the Rangers see Jason, Zack, and Trini off via the viewing globe and celebrate their first victory with Rocky, Adam, and Aisha.
89	29	"Goldar's Vice-Versa"	Terence H. Winkless	Douglas Sloan	November 12, 1994	233	N/A
The Rangers organize a Vice-versa Dance, where the girls invite the guys. Adam is not confident that he will be asked to the dance until a mysterious new girl catches his eye: Sabrina. Adam goes out with Sabrina and invites Aisha along, which Sabrina is not happy about at all. Sabrina lulls Adam into a false sense of security, but Aisha smells a rat. Meanwhile, the other Rangers are at the Youth Center preparing for the dance. They mention to Ms. Appleby that Adam is out with the new girl Sabrina. Ms. Appleby says there must be some mistake because the last new girl to enroll at Angel Grove High was Aisha. The Rangers sense something is up and contact Zordon, who locates Adam and Aisha. By this time, Sabrina has revealed her true identity of Scorpina. Goldar and Putties turn up and tie Adam and Aisha to a tree. The Rangers morph and fight the villains, while Billy frees Adam and Aisha with his Power Lance. They morph and join the fight, but Lord Zedd makes Goldar and Scorpina grow. The Rangers call on the Thunder Megazord and White Tigerzord. Scorpina gets a taste of the new Zords, not fighting since the era of the Dinozords. Both get heavily beaten and retreat to the moon. Meanwhile, in their quest to find the Power Rangers' secret identities, Bulk and Skull encounter a serious problem when two punk girls start following them around. Despite being given notes, the boys are horrified when they learn the two girls sent them the notes and are forced to dance with them.
90	30	"Mirror of Regret"	Terence H. Winkless	Cheryl Saban	November 14, 1994	234	N/A
Adam helps Sean, a young karate student, believe in himself. But Lord Zedd is about to destroy Adam's confidence when he sends Goldar to Angel Grove with the Mirror of Regret to bring back Adam's childhood memories to drain his energy. Adam is forced to face his demons from the past, and none of the Rangers can help him due to the fact that Lord Zedd has created Skelerena from a hyena picture that was on the cover of a magazine to keep them at bay.
91	31	"When is a Ranger Not a Ranger?"	Jonathan Tzachor	Judd Lynn	November 15, 1994	236	N/A
When Lord Zedd turns Adam's kaleidoscope into the Scatterbrain monster, it attacks Billy, Kimberly, and Tommy, robbing them of their memories as Power Rangers. When Zordon sends Rocky, Adam, and Aisha to help them, Scatterbrain wipes their minds as well, leaving the fate of the Power Rangers—and the world—in the unlikely hands of Bulk & Skull, who've finally discovered Power Rangers' identities. They trick Scatterbrain into restoring the Rangers' memories, but at the cost of their knowledge of their identities.
92	32	"Rocky Just Wants to Have Fun"	Terence H. Winkless	Mark Hoffmeier	November 16, 1994	228	N/A
A new Pachinko game is delivered to the Juice Bar, and Rocky loves it. But, Lord Zedd has a little game of his own to play when he casts a spell over Rocky, causing him only to want to play. The Rangers are annoyed when he refuses to fight, especially when it costs them dearly, leaving Tommy to face the Pachinko Head monster alone after creating it from the same Pachinko game.
93	33	"Lights, Camera, Action"	Terence H. Winkless	Daniel J. Sarnoff & Ellen Levy-Sarnoff	November 17, 1994	235	N/A
The Power Rangers take the message of the power of education to the airwaves. But, Zedd tries to stop the show by creating Showbiz Monster from a TV camera. Bulk and Skull attempt to enter the studio and try to unmask the Rangers, but are foiled when they accidentally attack the host.
94	34	"Where There's Smoke, There's Fire"	John Stewart	Jerry P. Jacobs	November 21, 1994	238	N/A
It's Fire Safety Week at Angel Grove High, and Aisha is selected as Fire Safety Captain. Lord Zedd becomes interested in fire too, when he sends Flame Head to Angel Grove to turn the city into one big hotspot. Aisha begins to take her responsibility for fire safety too seriously, to the point where she insists on fighting Lord Zedd's forces alone. She learns a harsh lesson in needing to rely on her friends for help when she realizes how powerful Zedd's forces are.
95	35	"Scavenger Hunt"	John Stewart	Stewart St. John	November 22, 1994	227	N/A
The Rangers go on a scavenger hunt. But, then Lord Zedd has other ideas to ruin the Rangers' game once and for all by creating Cannontop from a toy cannon. Bulk and Skull use a fortune teller to help them discover who the Power Rangers are, but are later foiled.
96	36	"The Great Bookala Escape"	John Stewart	Judd Lynn	November 23, 1994	240	N/A
An unusual crash landing creates a mystery for our heroes. The Rangers decide to investigate the spacecraft further and discover its strange cargo, a kind-hearted Kabuki-like alien named Bookala. But, Lord Zedd prepares to lay claim to the craft starting with creating Weldo from Billy's welding machine. After Weldo's defeat, the Rangers fool Lord Zedd with a fake diamond and a duplicate Bookala doll that Lord Zedd transforms into Bad Bookala.
97	37	"Forever Friends"	Terence H. Winkless	Cheryl Saban	November 28, 1994	239	N/A
Goldar kidnaps both Kimberly and Aisha's best friend Shawna. While our heroes plan to rescue their friends, Zedd creates the Jaws of Destruction from a saw to battle them.
98	38	"A Reel Fish Story"	Terence H. Winkless	Ellen Levy-Sarnoff & Douglas Sloan	November 29, 1994	237	N/A
While volunteering as a lifeguard at Angel Grove Lake, Rocky claims to a boy named Dougie that he has never seen monsters in the lake before as Bulk and Skull fail at taking advantage of this. This gives Zedd an idea to a revive Slippery Shark, Pirantishead, Goo Fish, and Commander Crayfish where he sends them to Angel Grove Lake where they are also instructed to destroy the Rangers. To make matters worse, only three Rangers can respond. Worst of all, once the Rangers unite against the monsters, Lord Zedd creates the Tube Monster from an inner tube that Bulk and Skull were using upon the city.
99	39	"Rangers Back in Time"	Terence H. Winkless	Shuki Levy & Shell Danielson	February 4, 1995	229	N/A
100	40	"Rangers Back in Time"	Terence H. Winkless	Shuki Levy & Shell Danielson	February 11, 1995	230	N/A
Part 1: Lord Zedd casts a spell that turns back the hands of time and turns the Power Rangers into kids. He then creates Photomare from a Polaroid camera which traps them in a photograph. Part 2: Young Bulk and Skull are on the run with the picture of the Rangers, which is precisely what Lord Zedd, Goldar, and the Photomare are after. Alpha 5 is charged with regaining the picture so that the Rangers will be freed. Once released, they must destroy the monster as well as the Rock of Time that is guarded by a revived Dramole, Oysterizer, and Invenusable Flytrap to undo the spell.
101	41	"The Wedding"	Shuki Levy	Shuki Levy & Shell Danielson	February 13, 1995	241	N/A
102	42	"The Wedding"	Shuki Levy	Shuki Levy & Shell Danielson	February 14, 1995	242	N/A
103	43	"The Wedding"	Shuki Levy	Shuki Levy & Shell Danielson	February 15, 1995	243	N/A
Part 1: The Rangers are going to Australia just as Lord Zedd is recharging. Rita, meanwhile, is back and ready for revenge. She orders her still loyal henchman Finster to make a potion for Lord Zedd to make him fall in love with her when he awakens. Alpha 5 misses the Rangers so much that Zordon suggests he take a walk. Finster tampers with Alpha 5's programming. Then Finster begins to revive some monsters that will also attend Rita and Zedd's wedding. When he returns, he creates havoc for the Rangers by tricking them into going to the Spectre Theatre where a revived Grumble Bee, Eye Guy, Soccadollo, Peckster, Rhinoblaster, Saliguana, Snizzard, Robogoat, Invenusable Flytrap, and Dramole attack them. To the Rangers' horror, they find that they can't escape, they are outnumbered, and can't use their powers. Part 2: The Rangers are fighting for their lives with no end in sight. They search desperately for a way out but find monsters at every turn. Lord Zedd awakens from his slumber and asks Rita to marry him. Goldar is very unhappy, to say the least, especially when he's charged with planning the wedding. The Rangers find a way out, and Lord Zedd makes Peckster and Rhinoblaster gigantic. Alpha 5 sabotages the zords while the Rangers are in the battle, forcing them to retreat. They teleport out, only to find themselves back in the Spectre Theatre from which they had just escaped. Meanwhile, much to Goldar's dismay, the wedding is about to begin. Part 3: Everyone on the moon, but Goldar is excited as Rita Repulsa and Lord Zedd tie the knot. The Rangers hatch a plan to escape again by getting past Peckster, Rhinoblaster, and the Z-Putties while Rita and Lord Zedd are traveling to Earth to destroy them personally. Goldar sends monsters who pursue the Rangers in an attempt to stop them from reaching the Command Center. When they finally get there, Billy fixes Alpha 5 and restores Zordon, who reveals that the pursuing monsters are gigantic and attacking the city. The Rangers eventually destroy the monsters but earn a bickering Zedd and Rita's fury. Alpha 5 feels guilty for his actions against the Rangers and Zordon.
104	44	"Return of the Green Ranger"	Shuki Levy	Shuki Levy	February 20, 1995	244	N/A
105	45	"Return of the Green Ranger"	Shuki Levy	Shuki Levy	February 21, 1995	245	N/A
106	46	"Return of the Green Ranger"	Shuki Levy	Shuki Levy & Shell Danielson	February 22, 1995	246	N/A
Part 1: The kids ponder a history assignment: what time period would they have liked to have lived in. Meanwhile, Rita summons the Wizard of Deception to send the Rangers back in time. There's just one thing that stands in their way, the White Ranger. The Wizard casts a spell on Bulk and Skull to obtain some of Tommy's hair to make a clone of the Green Ranger. When they fail, The Wizard finds Tommy and has a putty cut a bit of his hair off. The Wizard casts a spell on the hair, and the Green Ranger clone is reborn, unbeknownst to the Rangers. Tommy feels ill because of the spell and goes home to rest. The Green Ranger Clone Tom tricks the other Rangers into meeting with him, and the Wizard sends them back in time to late 18th century Angel Grove, and the Rangers find themselves trapped, completely powerless. Tommy is in total shock when he comes face to face with the evil Green Ranger. Part 2: The Green and White rangers engage in battle. They are perfectly matched until the Wizard intervenes and demorphs the White Ranger and orders the Green Ranger to bring back Dragonzord to destroy Angel Grove. Back in the 18th century, Angel Grove, the rest of the Rangers are aided by a girl who helps them escape. The Wizard shows up and casts a spell on some rats, making them human-sized and unleashing them on Angel Grove. The Rangers are horrified at not being able to use their powers and are forced to flee. Part 3: The Dragonzord is reawakened and under the evil influence of the Wizard. Tommy is weakened from demorphing and can barely function. The White Tigerzord is no match for the Dragonzord, while the White Ranger is in such a state. The Wizard and the Green Ranger corner him, but Tommy tricks them into revealing the whereabouts of the Rangers. After, Zordon says what must be done to free the Rangers. After bringing them back, the Rangers take on the Dragonzord. Tommy can take the Wizard's wand to destroy him and free the clone. Remorseful, Tom sends the Dragonzord back to its resting place for good. After dealing with the problem in the past, Tom decides to remain there, and Tommy heads back to his time.
107	47	"Best Man for the Job"	John Weil	Mark Hoffmeier	April 29, 1995	250	N/A
It's anything but politics as usual at Angel Grove High when both Tommy and Kimberly run for office. The competition heats up when Lord Zedd and Rita compete in who gets to take out the Rangers. For her to win, Rita sends Baboo and Squatt to use a magic rope on both candidates to turn them against each other and crush them. However, when Saba is captured, and the other Rangers learn the truth, can they try to convince Tommy and Kimberly to work together? Or will Rita succeed in defeating the Power Rangers with her newly acquired Tiger Zord? Meanwhile, Bulk tries inventive ways to win the class presidency but loses big when he learns that no one, including Skull, voted for him.
108	48	"Storybook Rangers"	John Weil	Douglas Sloan & Cheryl Saban	May 1, 1995	248	N/A
109	49	"Storybook Rangers"	John Weil	Douglas Sloan & Cheryl Saban	May 2, 1995	249	N/A
Part 1: There's a book fair at Angel Grove High, much to the delight of the Rangers. Tommy buys a book for Kimberly called "Grumble the Magic Elf" that she has loved since childhood. It tells the story about an elf named Grumble who was cursed by Mondo the Magician where he has to deliver toys to people. This inspires Rita to trap the Rangers inside. Once inside, Lord Zedd orders Putties to retrieve the book, and somehow, they end up inside the book. The Putties snatch the toys so that the Rangers can never leave. To make matters worse, two boys find the book and return it to the book fair. Adam, Aisha, and Billy can only watch in horror as Tommy, Kimberly, and Rocky aid Grumble the Elf and are attacked by a Snow Monster. Meanwhile, Bulk and Skull find a book that will help them animate a monster unaware that Zedd plans to have the duo create a monster for him. Part 2: Adam, Aisha, and Billy race against time to find the book Rocky, Kimberly, and Tommy are trapped in before it's too late. They are forced to search through hundreds of books, not knowing which one they are looking for. Unbeknownst to Bulk and Skull, Lord Zedd and Rita create a monster with the materials they were using to create a monster called Turkey Jerk because Skull used a cookbook instead of a monster-making book when putting it together. Kimberly, Tommy, and Rocky are buried in the avalanche until Grumble saves them while mentioning that the Snow Monster got buried in his own avalanche. The trio decides to ask Mondo the Magician to help them, but he gruffly refuses. Back in Angel Grove, Billy, Adam, and Aisha battle Turkey Jerk that is more difficult to handle than expected. Aisha gives Grumble a hand by drawing the toys so that the story can end happily. Just when things are starting to look up, Rita helps Mondo the Magician escape the book and attack Angel Grove. Can the Rangers defeat such a powerful foe?
110	50	"Wild West Rangers"	Armand Garabidian	Mark Litton	May 8, 1995	251	N/A
111	51	"Wild West Rangers"	Armand Garabidian	Mark Litton	May 9, 1995	252	N/A
Part 1: The Rangers teleport to the Command Center, but Kimberly ends up going through a time hole. Next thing she knows, she's in the wild west. Things take an interesting turn, to say the least, when Kimberly meets her friends' respective counterparts. The Rangers finally discover where she is but have to stop Goldar, Needlenose (who was created from a cactus), and Putties from going through the time hole, only to find themselves outnumbered. To make matters worse, the Rangers are paralyzed before they can prevent them from traveling back in time. The time hole closes so the Rangers can't follow, leaving Kimberly to face Needlenose, Goldar, and the Putties all alone. Part 2: As a last resort, Kimberly teleports to the Command Center of that era where its era's Zordon gives her what she'll need to face Needlenose if her friends' ancestors can help. There's just one problem; they don't even know how to fight. The White Stranger arrives to give the Rangers a hand.
112	52	"Blue Ranger Gone Bad"	John Weil	Judd Lynn	May 20, 1995	247	N/A
Billy creates a special project for his art class, which catches the eye of a classmates named Violet who makes a statue in a perfect likeness of him. Rita casts a spell on it to make it real to take his place while the others are preoccupied with the Putties. The Rangers are puzzled by "Billy's" odd behavior. Tommy suspects that something's up, which forces Rita to send the Z-Putties and Goldar. Meanwhile, it's the most unlikely source that frees the real Billy as Lord Zedd turns a sculpture into Vase Face. Time's running out, and the Rangers don't have their Morphers. The other Rangers don't know who is the real Billy. However, Kimberly saves the day by tricking the fake Billy into giving a wrong answer when she asks a question about a device that the real Billy knows.

=== Season 3 (1995) ===
No. overall	No. in season	Title	Directed by	Written by	Original release date	Prod. code
113	1	"A Friend in Need"	Worth Keeter	Shuki Levy & Shell Danielson	September 2, 1995	301
114	2	"A Friend in Need"	Worth Keeter	Shuki Levy & Shell Danielson	September 9, 1995	302
115	3	"A Friend in Need"	Worth Keeter	Shuki Levy & Shell Danielson	September 9, 1995	303
Part 1: Alpha 5's birth planet Edenoi is under attack by a spaceship under the command of Count Dregon who happens to be one of Lord Zedd's rivals. Thus, the Rangers (minus Kimberly who has the flu) teleport to Edenoi to find out what's going on. Meanwhile, Lord Zedd and Rita make a plan to invade Earth. Part 2: The Rangers meet up with the inhabitants of Edenoi and their prince Dex. Dex is also known as the Masked Rider. Dex tells the Rangers about the crystals that give special powers to the inhabitants and the history of why Count Dregon is attacking the planet. Meanwhile, Kimberly, while still ill, is fighting Repellator, a monster created by Finster, on planet Earth. Part 3: On Edenoi, the Rangers and Masked Rider fight with the Plague Sentry, the Plague Patrol, and the Cogworts. Meanwhile, Kimberly has infected Repellator with the flu; thus, the monster has to retreat to get an antidote from Finster, earning him Lord Zedd and Rita's fury. After helping the Masked Rider defeat Dregon's forces, the Rangers return to Earth to reunite with the Pink Ranger, summon the Thunderzords, and destroy Repellator. However, the Rangers are unaware that Count Dregon had followed them to Earth. The episode ends with King Lexion telling Dex to defend Earth against Count Dregon. Note: This three-parter acted as a backdoor pilot for the TV show Masked Rider.
116	4	"Ninja Quest"	Terence H. Winkless	Shuki Levy & Shell Danielson	September 11, 1995	304
117	5	"Ninja Quest"	Terence H. Winkless	Shuki Levy & Shell Danielson	September 12, 1995	305
118	6	"Ninja Quest"	Terence H. Winkless	Shuki Levy & Shell Danielson	September 13, 1995	306
119	7	"Ninja Quest"	Terence H. Winkless	Shuki Levy & Shell Danielson	September 14, 1995	307
Part 1: Rita's brother Rito Revolto arrives and plants some eggs nearby. Then, Rito teleports to Earth and lures the Rangers into a trap. Just when the Rangers are about to destroy Rito, he gets help from Fighting Flea, Lizzinator, Octophantom, and Stag Beetle who were recreated by Finster. The Rangers are outmatched, and ultimately, the Thunder Megazord and Tigerzord are destroyed. Part 2: Zedd, Rita, and Rito are having a party because the Rangers are finally destroyed. Meanwhile, the eggs Rito planted are opening, revealing Tenga Warriors. On Earth, Zordon sends the Rangers to the Desert of Despair to find Ninjor, the creator of the Power Coins, as he can't bring back their Zords. While traveling through the desert, Zedd finds the Rangers and sends the Tengas to fight them. The Rangers are no match for the Tengas and narrowly escape. Part 3: The Rangers walk through a hidden valley, enter a temple, and meet Ninjor. He gives the Rangers new Ninja Powers and new Ninja Zords. With their new powers, the Rangers easily beat the Tengas. However, the egg that was planted nearby the temple starts to hatch. Part 4: The Rangers call their Ninja Zords to fight Rito. Rito is putting up an even match until the Zords combine into the Megazord and quickly defeat him. Meanwhile, in the Desert of Despair, another egg opens, giving birth to another monster of Rito's called Vampirus. This monster attacks Ninjor but is heavily outmatched by Ninjor's power. Ninjor transforms and, together with the Megazord, destroy the evil beast.
120	8	"A Brush with Destiny"	Terence H. Winkless	Gilles Wheeler	September 18, 1995	308
Kimberly has been having nightmares about moving to Paris. Meanwhile, Finster creates a device that lets Rita and Zedd see people's dreams, including Kimberly's. Zedd creates a plan by making Artistmole, the monster in Kimberly's dream, real with help from Finster's device as part of a plot to destroy the Earth as well as the Rangers. The Rangers ask for Ninjor's but are drained of their powers. Kimberly has to face her fears to destroy the Artistmole and save her friends.
121	9	"Passing the Lantern"	Armand Garabidian	Kati Rocky	September 19, 1995	309
Adam receives a special gift from his family: a paper lantern. Then, Billy and Adam learn of the lantern's powers. Meanwhile, Lord Zedd has plans of his own when he sends Rito, Baboo, and Squatt to steal the lantern so he can harness its powers. However, they screw up when Rito ineptly tosses aside Adam's lantern (recovered by Bulk and Skull) and takes the others instead. Lord Zedd is infuriated with the trio's foul-up. Still, Rita manages to salvage the situation and takes one lantern to create Lanterra to fight the Rangers.
122	10	"Wizard for a Day"	Armand Garabidian	Mark Hoffmeier	September 20, 1995	310
Rocky switches places with his strict science teacher Mr. Wilton. Meanwhile, Rita and Lord Zedd decide to give Rito the day to destroy the Rangers to teach him a lesson. They take advantage of their day off by laughing at him when Finster rudely refuses to take orders from him. Rito decides to turn the Rangers into monsters, but accidentally turns Mr. Wilton into Marvo the Meanie, who begins to change everyone into a liquid, including five of the Rangers. Rocky learns that, while destroying Marvo will bring back Mr. Wilton, the others will be liquids forever if he doesn't do it in time. Meanwhile, Bulk and Skull, still vying for work, spy on Rocky in a suit and believe he has stolen Mr. Wilton's books, unaware it is a teacher/student switch day. They learn their lesson the hard way when a furious Mr. Wilton confronts them.
123	11	"Fourth Down and Long"	Armand Garabidian	Mark Litton	September 23, 1995	311
Rocky's uncle, a star quarterback, comes to visit. On the moon, Finster accidentally creates Centiback from his magic centipede where he has the power to transform anyone into a football. After all but Rocky gets turned into a football, he and Ninjor go to fight Centiback and save the other Rangers.
124	12	"Stop the Hate Master"	Bob Radler	Stewart St. John	September 25, 1995	313
125	13	"Stop the Hate Master"	Bob Radler	Stewart St. John	September 26, 1995	314
Part 1: Aisha's hope of getting into the Angel Girls club ends in disappointment when only Kimberly is let in. However, Kimberly discovers that the club's leader, Veronica, didn't let Aisha in because of her parents' income. Thus, she quits the club out of loyalty to Aisha. Zedd and Rita create the evil Hate Master from Finster's seeds of evil, who is sent to spread hate everywhere. Meanwhile, the Rangers are attacked by Tengas, and the Hate Master places the Rangers under his spell. All but Aisha is affected. Lt. Stone puts Bulk and Skull in charge of catching the Graffiti Bandit. Part 2: Aisha tries to break Hate Master's hold on her friends but is unsuccessful. Alpha and Aisha discover that the necklace her grandmother gave her will help to save her friends from the spell. Once the Rangers are freed, they morph and destroy the Hate Master. After, they apologize for the things they said while under the spell. Aisha is accepted in the girls club when the other members learn of Veronica, only allowing members whose families had a high income or whose mothers were members, and they kick her out. Bulk and Skull try to capture the "Graffiti Bandit" plaguing Angel Grove. Bulk is surprised when he learns the bandit is Skull, who's been sleepwalking. Ernie forces them to clean the wall.
126	14	"Final Face-Off"	Armand Garabidian	Douglas Sloan	October 2, 1995	312
All but Kimberly go to the museum and learn about the face-stealing monster that piques Rita's interest. While the Rangers are kept busy, Squatt, Baboo, and Rito steals the lamp which contains the monster and keeps it bound, so it can't harm anyone. To the Rangers' horror, Rita releases it and sends it to Earth. Aisha's and Adam's faces are stolen in battle; it takes a few things from the museum to defeat it, but is there any way to restore Aisha, Adam, and countless others who have lost their faces?
127	15	"The Potion Notion"	Bob Radler	Jackie Marchand	October 9, 1995	315
Love is in the air and the universe when Zedd surprises Rita with a second honeymoon. Then, Rito sends Finster's monster Miss Chief with a love potion to Angel Grove where things get strange. This causes Kimberly to fall for Skull and Bulk to fall for Aisha. Also, Goldar found out about Rita's plot and used Finster to create an antidote to free Lord Zedd. However, he is further shocked when he learns that potion or not, both Zedd and Rita do love each other. The Rangers managed to free Kimberly and Bulk from their trances, though Kim learned she had broken Skulls heart in the end.
128	16	"I'm Dreaming of a White Ranger"	Douglas Sloan	Ron Milbauer & Terri Hughes	November 23, 1995	316
On Christmas Eve, Zedd and Rita send their troops to the North Pole to capture Santa Claus and his elves, thus preventing Santa from delivering his Christmas presents. Meanwhile, Kimberly misses her mother, who won't be able to go home for Christmas. The Rangers go to Santa's rescue but realize they can't morph to fight Rito, Goldar, and the Tengas. After quickly tying Goldar, Rito, and the Tengas with a red ribbon, Santa Claus sends them as a present to Zedd and Rita, who are angry. Meanwhile, the Rangers go home – before they do; however, Santa gives them a bag of gifts to take back to Angel Grove to give to the kids at Ernie's Juice Bar, where Kimberly and a group of children are going to be singing Christmas songs. Throughout the episode, there is a girl who is in the singing group, who is not too eager about this because her father won't be there to see it, all she wants to do is be with him, so she tells her to makes friends, and she does with Kimberly. The girl's father shows up, and Kimberly's mother comes for Christmas. Meanwhile, Zedd and Rita, Goldar, Rito, and the others are enjoying Christmas, and Rito gives a present to Goldar and says he's his best friend. In the end, the Rangers, Bulk, and Skull, who had earlier told the girl that if they saw Santa, they'd ask him to have her father come, Kimberly's parents, the music group, and most of the people at Ernie's Juice Bar sing together.
129	17	"A Ranger Catastrophe"	Douglas Sloan	Douglas Sloan	October 16, 1995	317
130	18	"A Ranger Catastrophe"	Douglas Sloan	Douglas Sloan	October 17, 1995	318
Part 1: Kimberly and Aisha find a stray cat that leaves Rita purring with delight. Then, Rito is sent to the animal shelter where Aisha volunteers. Summoning their ninja powers, the Rangers face off with Rito and the Tengas as Aisha's stray cat watches from the window. But, this is no ordinary cat as our heroes begin to understand. Part 2: The cat is revealed to be a new girl to Angel Grove, Katherine Hillard. Unfortunately for the Rangers, she is in alliance with Lord Zedd and Rita. Katherine tricks Tommy into helping her fix her car then rewards him with a free drive, but this was all a part of Rita's plan because Tommy ends up in another dimension. Rita retrieves Kat, but Tommy is left to fight both Rito and Goldar. The other Rangers try to help bring Tommy home but are stopped by the monster Katastrophe, who is Katherine. The Rangers defeat the Kat monster, free Tommy, and are surprised to find Kat sitting in the park. Little do they know she is after the Rangers.
131	19	"Changing of the Zords"	Jonathan Tzachor	Stewart St. John	October 31, 1995	319
132	20	"Changing of the Zords"	Jonathan Tzachor	Stewart St. John	November 1, 1995	320
133	21	"Changing of the Zords"	Jonathan Tzachor	Stewart St. John	November 2, 1995	321
Part 1: Rita orders Katherine to steal Kimberly's power coin. While the Tengas distract the Rangers, Katherine takes Kimberly's power coin and brings it to Rita. Kimberly is immediately affected and slowly loses her powers (the power coins are connected to their natural human energy). Tommy and Ninjor team up to take on Goldar. Tommy uses his Falcon Zord but gets taken out by Katherine, who steals the Falcon Zord, while Ninjor is captured by Zedd. Part 2: Kimberly is still losing her powers and, ultimately, passes out. The other Rangers move to Angel Grove park to fight Incisorator sent by Zedd. Meanwhile, the Tengas attack Katherine to lure Kimberly into battle. Kimberly wakes up and teleports to Katherine to fight off the Tengas. Because Kimberly has been weakened due to the loss of her power coin, she is no match for the Tengas and gets beaten while Katherine watches. Goldar shows up and kidnaps Kimberly, who he brings to Lord Zedd. As Zedd calls a parley with the Rangers, Zordon agrees to teleport Lord Zedd to the Command Center to talk about his demands. Zedd gives the Rangers two options: pilot his new evil Zords or Kimberly will be destroyed. Part 3: The Rangers agree to pilot Zedd's evil Shogunzords. Zedd teleports back to the moon and is having a party with Rita and Rito. Using the viewing globe, Billy locates the whereabouts of Kimberly. Tommy, using the device from "The Green Candle", goes to the dark dimension. Tommy finds Kimberly but gets intercepted by Zedd. Meanwhile, Rita sends the evil Shogunzords to Earth to be piloted by the Rangers. Billy finds a way to override the controls using the power coins. Finding out about this, Rita orders Finster to send down a monster as he creates See Monster. In the Dark Dimension, Tommy finally beats Zedd, rescues Kimberly, and teleports back to Earth. Tommy teams up with the other Shogunzords to destroy See Monster.
134	22	"Follow That Cab!"	Terence H. Winkless	Shuki Levy & Shell Danielson	November 4, 1995	322
Kimberly's car is stolen in broad daylight, primarily due to Bulk and Skull unintentionally allowing the thief to hijack it, so Bulk, Skull, and Kimberly take a cab to follow the culprit. But Zedd makes a few changes by transforming it into Crabbie Cabbie using Finster's vehicular transformer apparatus. At the Command Center, the Rangers are presented with all new Shark Cycles to chase after Crabbie Cabbie. Bulk and Skull eventually catch the thief.
135	23	"A Different Shade of Pink"	Bob Radler	Douglas Sloan	November 6, 1995	323
136	24	"A Different Shade of Pink"	Bob Radler	Douglas Sloan	November 7, 1995	324
137	25	"A Different Shade of Pink"	Bob Radler	Douglas Sloan	November 8, 1995	325
Part 1: Kimberly meets Gunther Schmidt, an international gymnast trainer. Schmidt offers to coach Kimberly for the Pan Global Games. Because of this, Kimberly no longer has time to fulfill her duties as a Ranger. Rita and Zedd launch multiple attacks on Earth, requiring the Rangers to split up and take them on. The Rangers are beaten, and Kimberly has to give up her training to help her team fight Goldar, the Tengas, and a revived Vampirus and Artistmole. Meanwhile, Katherine is slowly losing the spell cast by Rita, feeling sympathy for Kimberly. The episode ends with Kimberly training all night and day, eventually passing out from exhaustion. Katherine is there and finally realizes what she has done to Kimberly and the rest of the Rangers. Part 2: Kimberly is escorted into the hospital. The Rangers visit, but have to leave to fight the Tengas and Rito as Zordon advises Kimberly to continue resting. While the Rangers are away, Katherine tells Kimberly about the spell Rita cast on her. Meanwhile, Finster creates Garbage Mouth. Garbage Mouth tries to destroy Angel Grove, but is stopped by the Rangers. The episode ends with Rita showing up and giving the Rangers a choice: turn in Katherine or Ninjor will be destroyed. Part 3: Katherine decides to exchange herself for Ninjor. However, Rita tricks the Rangers and they lose Katherine to her and Zedd. Katherine gets put into a prison cell with Rito as the guard. She gives Rito a back massage and then steals the key while Rito falls asleep. Katherine finds the Pink Power coin locked in a case and is confronted by Rita. Before she can call for the Tengas to recapture Katherine, she is teleported to the Command Center and gives the coin back to Kimberly. Kimberly gets her confidence back, trains for the gymnastics tournament, and wins. Schmidt offers Kimberly to move to his facility in Florida to compete for the Pan Global Games. The episode ends with Kimberly giving her pink power coin to Katherine.
138	26	"Rita's Pita"	Terence H. Winkless	Jackie Marchand	November 11, 1995	326
Tommy preaches the importance of eating right to one of his students who doesn't have healthy eating habits. This inspires Rita to use Finster's monster Ravenator to go inside Tommy and make him want nothing but junk food. Tommy's ravenous appetite makes him stuff his face nonstop as the student loses faith in him. Kat discovers what's going on and informs the other Rangers. How will the Rangers destroy a monster that's inside Tommy's stomach without harming him as well?
139	27	"Another Brick in the Wall"	Terence H. Winkless	Mark Hoffmeier	November 13, 1995	327
Katherine comes up with a plan to clean up an old lot, and she recruits her friends to help her construct a new homeless shelter. However, Rita is still angry that Katherine is no longer under her spell and turned into a "goody-goody" Ranger. With the help of Rito, the resulting battle causes the ruin of Katherine's day of work, building the shelter. Before they can repair it, four of the Rangers are entrapped by Brick Bully who Rita accidentally created, but Katherine helps release them with the aid of Alpha. Billy manages to destroy the monster single-handedly. After the battle, they can repair the shelter in time. In the finale, the Mayor of Angel Grove presents Katherine with an Outstanding Achievement Award for her work on the housing project.
140	28	"A Chimp in Charge"	Terence H. Winkless	Douglas Sloan	November 18, 1995	328
Katherine and Aisha teach a chimpanzee named Kelly to communicate with sign language for a school assignment. However, Rita and Lord Zedd have plans for Kelly as Lord Zedd turns her into Sinister Simian to lure the Rangers out to fight it. Now, the Rangers have to find a way to defeat the monster without harming it and return Kelly to normal.
141	29	"Master Vile and the Metallic Armor"	Bob Radler	Mark Litton	November 20, 1995	329
142	30	"Master Vile and the Metallic Armor"	Bob Radler	Mark Litton	November 21, 1995	330
143	31	"Master Vile and the Metallic Armor"	Bob Radler	Mark Litton	November 22, 1995	331
Part 1: The Earth and Rita and Zedd's palace shake with the arrival of one very evil visitor: Rita & Rito's father, Master Vile. While Vile is furious with Rita for marrying Zedd, he announces his plan to get the Zeo Crystal. Now, the Rangers must unravel the mystery of his plan and prepare for their biggest battle yet. Part 2: Tommy and Kat volunteer to search for the Falcon Zord and the Zeo Crystal. Kat distracts Zedd and Rita by claiming she wants to be evil again to give Tommy time to search for the Zeo Crystal. The other Rangers fight the Blue Globber, who has absorbed Ninjor's powers. Part 3: Taking control of the Youth Center, Master Vile throws an End of the World Party which is attended by Fighting Flea, Slippery Shark, Oysterizer, Robogoat, Invenusable Flytrap, Vampirus, Artistmole, Centiback, Hate Master, Miss Chief, Incisorator, See Monster, Garbage Mouth, and Brick Bully. The Rangers travel to another dimension to retrieve their Zords, which have been sent there by Master Vile. Alpha discovers a way to weaken the Blue Globber.
144	32	"The Sound of Dischordia"	Marco Garibaldi	Stewart St. John	November 25, 1995	332
Aisha and Katherine write a school song. Master Vile has a song too; he calls upon Dischordia (who was previously seen at Master Vile's End of the World party), who casts a spell on the girls to change their tune.
145	33	"Rangers in Reverse"	Marco Garibaldi	Douglas Sloan	November 27, 1995	333
Five Rangers are at the Juice Bar, planning a surprise birthday trip to the Carnival for Kat. While the Rangers celebrate her birthday, Master Vile brings forth the Orb of Doom from beneath the Earth. Immediately, Alpha senses trouble, and Zordon calls the Rangers. He warns them about the effects of the Orb of Doom: if the villains secure it, time will be reversed, and they will be turned into children. The Rangers morph and split into two groups. Tommy, Rocky, and Kat face Rito, Goldar, and a group of Tengas, while Adam, Billy, and Aisha face another group of Tengas headed towards the carnival, being forced to use their Metallic Armor power-up to defeat them. While the Rangers are occupied, Rito secures the Orb of Doom. Tommy attempts to remove it but cannot penetrate its energy field. Vile activates the Orb, which reverses time on Earth and turns everyone in the vicinity (the Rangers, Bulk, Skull, Lt. Stone, and everyone at the carnival) into kids. Rita, Rito, Lord Zedd, and Goldar then make themselves grow and attack. The Ranger kids (who still remember being Rangers) attempt to morph, but their powers do not work with them as children, leaving them powerless to stop the giant villains.

=== Re-version (2010) ===
The re-version of Mighty Morphin Power Rangers (also known as Mighty Morphin Power Rangers) was created by Haim Saban and Shuki Levy, and began airing on January 2, 2010, on ABC, and concluded on August 28, 2010. The re-version season was a re-broadcasting of approximately half of the first season of MMPR, which was originally broadcast in 1993, but BVS Entertainment added several visual effects to the old footage, in addition to an updated opening sequence. Although nothing beyond this about the television show was new, upon repurchase of the franchise by Haim Saban, it was nonetheless officially regarded as the 18th season of Power Rangers by his new company Saban Brands, until the promotion for Power Rangers Samurai included season numbering that ignored the re-version.

No.	Title	Directed by	Written by	Original release date
1	"Day of the Dumpster"	Adrian Carr	Tony Oliver & Shuki Levy	January 2, 2010
When two astronauts come across a strange dumpster on the moon, they open it, accidentally releasing Rita Repulsa and her minions: Goldar, Squatt, Baboo, and Finster. Rita then sets her eyes on the nearest planet: Earth. Meanwhile, at a local youth center in Angel Grove, California, we are introduced to "teenagers with attitude" Jason, Zack, Kimberly, Billy, and Trini. Within the California desert, at the Command Center, Zordon and Alpha 5 are alerted of Rita's escape and teleport the five to the Command Center. After receiving Power Morphers, the teens morph into the Mighty Morphin Power Rangers and take on Goldar and the Putty Patrol. Also making their debut bullies, Bulk and Skull and Juice Bar proprietor Ernie.
2	"High Five"	Adrian Carr	Steve Kramer	January 2, 2010
After seeing Jason climb a rope at Ernie's Juice Bar, Trini reveals to the other Ranger teens that she is terrified of heights. Billy then unveils his latest invention, wrist communicators with which the rangers can contact Zordon and teleport to the Command Center. On the moon, Rita decides to trap the Rangers in a time warp the same way she did Zordon. Squatt and Baboo send a rigged toy rocket to Earth that activates the time warp. Rita has Finster create the zombie-like Bones monster to control the time warp. Zordon sends the teens to defeat a small band of Putties. During the fight, Billy gets chased to the top of a cliff, and Trini must face her fears to go up and save him. With the Putty Patrol retreating, the Rangers morph to confront Bones but are sucked into the time warp. Bones is destroyed, but Rita sends down a Giant, which then grabs hold of Jason.
3	"Teamwork"	Robert Hughes	Cheryl Saban	January 9, 2010
Kimberly and Trini attempt to close down a hazardous waste dump. Little do they know Rita is behind the dumpsite and plans to destroy the earth by pollution. The Putty Patrol soon ambushes the two girls. Rita unleashes the powerful Mighty Minotaur onto Earth to keep the others busy. The boys are forced to morph and confront the Minotaur first. He proves to be an overwhelming opponent, and Rita decides to use her wand to make him grow. Trini and Kimberly can defeat the putties, and the rangers summon their Dinozords. Predicting defeat, Zordon recalls them back to the Command Center and awards the rangers special weapons; Jason wields the Power Sword, Trini the Power Daggers, Billy the Power Lance, Kimberly the Power Bow, and Zack the Power Axe. By working as a team and combining their new arsenal, will the beast be slain?
4	"A Pressing Engagement"	Adrian Carr	Jeff Deckman & Ronnie Sperling	January 9, 2010
At the Juice Bar, Jason is trying to break Bulk's bench-pressing record but cannot do so. Doubting his ability to succeed, the other Ranger teens, Kimberly and Zack, try to comfort him but have mixed success. Rita decides to isolate Jason from the other Rangers by sending to earth the King Sphinx. Using his powerful wings, the monster blows Kimberly and, soon after, Zack away from the fight, leaving Jason alone. After teleporting himself and Jason to a desert, the Sphinx is joined by Goldar. After regrouping with Billy and Trini, the teens arrive at the Command Center and witness firsthand Jason's struggle with a grown Goldar and Sphinx.
5	"Different Drum"	Jeff Reiner	Julianne Klemm	January 16, 2010
Kimberly teaches a dance class at the juice bar. Melissa, who cannot hear Kimberly's commands, starts to run into the other girls, embarrassed she leaves the group. Billy soon loses his footing and falls about the exercise area; while Bulk fails miserably at a dance-off with Zack, Rita decides that music is the perfect way to conquer the Rangers. She summons Gnarly Gnome, a garden gnome with a magical accordion, and sends him to Earth. Gnarly Gnome's music hypnotizes some of the girls from the dancing class, and they are lured to a cave. Thankfully, Melissa is unaffected by the spell as she is deaf. She rushes to tell Kimberly and leads them to the cave. The Rangers and their Zords take on Gnarly Gnome and manage to defeat him. Melissa is hailed as a hero for helping and rejoins the dancing class with new confidence.
6	"Food Fight"	Robert Hughes	Cheryl Saban	January 16, 2010
Ernie hosts a Cultural Food Fair at the juice bar, and the Rangers help out, offering foods from around the world to patrons. When Bulk and Skull arrive, they turn the peaceful fair into a full-on food fight. Rita is inspired by this madness and generates Pudgy Pig, a wicked monster is always hungry. Pudgy Pig will deplete the entire world of its food supply in 48 hours unless the Rangers can thwart him. Problems arise when the villain eats the group's Power Weapons, but Trini notices that Pudgy Pig cannot stand the taste of spicy foods. She devises a trap that hopefully will expel the weapons from the porker.
7	"Big Sisters"	Jeff Reiner	Gary Glasberg & Shuki Levy	January 23, 2010
Kimberly and Trini get the task of being "big sisters" to a mischievous little girl named Maria. Rita soon discovers a chest containing the Power Eggs, magic eggs with the power to conquer all. Only no one in Rita's bunch can open it. It's discovered only the innocence of a child will release the eggs. Rita kidnaps the bratty child with the intent of using her to open the chest. The Rangers end up facing the Chunky Chicken monster to save the annoying girl. All of this, plus, Billy unveils his specially modified VW Beetle, known as the RADBUG.
8	"Switching Places"	Jeff Reiner	Shuki Levy & Steve Kramer	January 30, 2010
Billy has invented the machine that reads minds which he tests out on himself and Kimberly. Unknown to him. However, Squatt has tampered with the device, and as a result, Kimberly's mind ends up in Billy's body and vice versa, driving the two at each other's throats. Rita then sends down the Genie to further complicate things. With Kimberly and Billy's minds boggled, how can they work as a team to bottle up this fiend?
9	"I, Eye Guy"	David Blyth	Stewart St. John	February 6, 2010
Billy's young protege, Willie, has created his best invention yet a hologame and enters it into a science fair. Bulk and Skull happen upon the science fair and cause trouble. While the teens resolve the situation rather humorously, the commotion leads Willie to be disqualified! Disheartened, Willie flees to reflect on things when he's kidnapped by Eye Guy so that the monster can steal his vast intelligence. The teens morph into action but soon find out Eyeguy won't be as easily defeated. Even the combined Power Blaster cannot destroy this monster.
10	"Foul Play in the Sky"	Shuki Levy	Shuki Levy	February 13, 2010
Kimberly goes for flying lessons with her pilot uncle Steve, with Bulk & Skull tagging along. Rita's henchman Squatt spikes Steve's drink with a sleeping potion, which kicks into effect while in Angel Grove's skies. Kimberly nervously takes over flying the four-seater plane, but can she land safely even with a little guidance from Alpha 5? Meanwhile, her teammates face the dreaded Snizard! To make matters worse, only Kimberly's bow and arrow are the only means of destroying the Snizzard.
11	"For Whom the Bell Trolls"	Robert Hughes	Jeff Deckman & Ronnie Sperling and Stewart St. John	February 20, 2010
Trini brings her favorite doll, an elf named Mr. Ticklesneezer, to Angel Grove High for Hobby Week. This catches the eye of Rita, who has the doll stolen and turned into a real monster! Ticklesneezer goes around shrinking everything, from buildings to trains, and collecting them into bottles. Can the Rangers bring an end to this benign nightmare?
12	"Happy Birthday, Zack"	Jeff Reiner	Stewart St. John	February 27, 2010
The Ranger teens & Ernie plan a surprise party at the Juice Bar for Zack. The secrecy leads him to believe they've all forgotten about his birthday. Rita shows she cares by sending down a special treat, a vicious black armored monster known as Knasty Knight. Zack soon finds out he is way over his head. Happy Birthday indeed.
13	"No Clowning Around"	Adrian Carr	Mark Hoffmeier	March 27, 2010
The Rangers attend a fair at Angel Grove Park, along with Trini's cousin Sylvia. One particular clown, named Pineapple, lures Sylvia away from Trini when she isn't looking. When Trini catches up with Sylvia, she witnesses Pineapple turn Sylvia into a cardboard cutout. The fair is a trap for our heroes as they soon find out when the putty patrol arrives, Trini takes Sylvia to Billy's lab to try to return Sylvia to normal. When all the Putties are dealt with, the Rangers confront Pineapple, who reveals himself as Pineoctopus Finster's latest creation.
14	"Green with Evil"	Robert Hughes	Gary Glasberg & Stewart St. John	April 3, 2010
15	"Green with Evil"	Robert Hughes	Tom Wyner & Cheryl Saban and Stewart St. John	April 10, 2010
16	"Green with Evil"	Robert Hughes	Mark Ryan & Stewart St. John	May 8, 2010
17	"Green with Evil"	Robert Hughes	Cindy McKay & Stewart St. John	May 22, 2010
18	"Green with Evil"	Robert Hughes	Gary Glasberg & Stewart St. John	June 5, 2010
Tommy Oliver, a new kid in town with martial arts skills that rival even Jason's, catches Kimberly's eye, as well as Rita Repulsa's. She kidnaps Tommy and places an evil spell over him; by granting him a power coin, he transforms into her Evil Green Ranger! Infiltrating the Command Center, Tommy gives Alpha 5 a virus and disables Zordon. Rita then lures the teens out by growing Goldar, but our heroes are surprised by the Green Ranger. The Rangers overpowered, retreat to the damaged Command Center. Without Zordon, the rangers are not able to learn anything about their newest enemy. With the Command Center still incapacitated from the Green Ranger's attack, the Ranger teens remain at a loss for a plan. A repaired Alpha 5, Billy and Trini attempt to repair and restore operations with Zordon. Soon after a successful training run involving Putties, Rita gives Tommy the Sword of Darkness, which acts as a catalyst for keeping him under her evil spell permanently. After he meets with Jason, Tommy then teleports the Red Ranger to the Dark Dimension! Trapped, with no way out, no morphing method, and no way of contacting his teammates, Jason faces Goldar alone. Back on earth, the remaining rangers face the Green Ranger again. Jason continues his struggle with Goldar in the Dark Dimension, and eventually, the Green Ranger as well. Luckily, in the nick of time, Billy can lock onto his signal and teleports him to safety. But with Zordon still lost, the victory is bittersweet, at best. To make things worse, Rita summons Scorpina, a female warrior long buried in a cave, with a real nasty sting. She fights the Rangers but is recalled by Rita as she reveals her master plan to rid the Rangers of their zords forever. Phase One: Lure the supergroup out by unleashing a fully grown Goldar. Watching Goldar demolish the city via the viewing globe, The Rangers have no choice but to morph and activate Megazord. All part of Rita's plan. A spell eclipses the sun and cuts off Megazord's solar power reserves. Using her Magic Wand, Rita grows Scorpina, and soon after, Green Ranger! Though the Power Sword adds a boost of energy, the Megazord soon falls to the trio of evil. The Zords separate and scatter into a burning chasm opened by Repulsa. With their fighting spirit diminished, our heroes return to the Command Center, and the true identity of the Green Ranger is soon revealed. Tommy is shown to be the Green Ranger, and Jason plans to break the spell holding him under Rita's control. Her endgame now realized Rita brings forth the ancient Green Dragonzord from Angel Grove bay. It begins to rampage through the city. The rangers, helpless without their zords, watch the destruction unfold. Zordon's transmission is finally reestablished. The Megazord is recovered and victoriously faces the Dragonzord. With the zord incapacitated, Tommy is confronted in a climactic swordfight by Jason. Will the Red Ranger succeed in severing Rita's ties on Tommy, or will he forever be lost to evil?
19	"The Trouble with Shellshock"	David Blyth	Stewart St. John & Julianne Klemm	July 17, 2010
Tommy, now part of the team, joins the others in a friendly game of basketball. While on the moon, Rita naps. Baboo & Squatt take charge by making their monster, a turtle named Shellshock. This monster, equipped with a stoplight on his back, flashes green and puts Trini in perpetual motion. Flashing its red beam freezes Billy, Zack, and Kimberly. Shellshock wreaks more havoc by accident than on purpose but still proves to be a major problem for Jason and Tommy.
20	"Itsy Bitsy Spider"	Robert Hughes	Steve Kramer	July 17, 2010
Trini & Billy petition to save the Forest Spirit Statue from demolition. It supposedly protects the woods from nasty bug infestations. Rita swipes the statue and replaces it with a lookalike, which hides her Spidertron monster within. Zack brings his young Hip-Hop Kido class to the park to work out nearby, and all but Zack are put under a sleeping spell by Spidertron, who soon reveals himself. Unfortunately for Zack, he's deathly afraid of bugs, spiders especially! Jason and company morph into action, and the eight-legged menace grows. It looks like it's time to feature a new zord combination in this fight: Dragonzord in Battle Mode.
21	"Power Ranger Punks"	David Blyth	Mark Hoffmeier	July 24, 2010
The gang is playing a game of volleyball when Baboo appears above the field. He slips an odd red potion into the glasses of water lying on a bench without being noticed. Kimberly and Billy drink the water and suddenly start acting like real punks! Rita plots to use the divided Rangers to allow her latest monster, the Terror Toad destroy the town. Alpha must journey to another dimension to find a special singing squash, as only its juice can restore Billy and Kimberly to their right minds. Meanwhile, Jason fights a losing battle against Terror Toad, as the toad devours Trini and Zack.
22	"The Spit Flower"	David Blyth	Peggy Nicoll	July 24, 2010
Kimberly is given designing a flower float for the big Angel Grove parade. But Putties drop by the Juice Bar and trash it before she can turn the design in! Kimberly frets over losing it and soon has to face the evil flesh-eating-blossom-spewing Spit Flower monster. To make matters worse, the ranger's zords fail in stomping this flower.
23	"Life's a Masquerade"	Robert Hughes	Cheryl Saban	July 31, 2010
There's a costume party going on at the Youth Center! Rita uses this distraction to mine a special clay on Earth, from which she'll create a breed of Super Putties. She sends her version of Frankenstein's Monster to the party, and he's immediately mistaken for Tommy. Billy, dressed as Detective Sherlock Holmes, investigates and finds that Franke is no Tommy. Time to morph.
24	"Gung Ho!"	Robert Hughes	Mark Hoffmeier	July 31, 2010
Jason & Tommy team-up for an upcoming Team Ninja competition at the Youth Center. They have trouble working together, as both are used to sparring one-on-one. Rita then unleashes the Super Putties As the other Rangers fight the nigh-invincible clay soldiers, Zordon sends Jason & Tommy off to retrieve new weapons. They face a strange metal creature known as Titanus and must learn teamwork in the face of adversity... or both will be killed.
25	"Island of Illusion"	Terence H. Winkless	Chris Schoon & Shuki Levy	August 7, 2010
26	"Island of Illusion"	Terence H. Winkless	Stewart St. John & Chris Schoon and Shuki Levy	August 7, 2010
There's an upcoming dance competition, and despite his usual smooth moves, Zack's got a serious case of self-doubt. Rita is inspired and aims to send the six Rangers to her very own transdimensional island, where worst fears become a reality! She summons the celestial being known as Lokar to aid in this task. With his wicked Mutitis creature, is the Megazord any match, or are our heroes island-bound? Trapped on the strange Island of Illusion, each of the six Ranger teens comes face to face with their own worst fears. The island's only inhabitant, an elf named Quagmire, appears and offers them rhyming reminders of self-confidence, but is he a friend or foe? Even if they can get off the island, can the team last a second round against Mutitis?
27	"Wheel of Misfortune"	Terence H. Winkless	Mark Ryan & Cheryl Saban	August 14, 2010
The Ranger teens are involved with a stage play of Rumpelstiltskin at Angel Grove High. Kimberly's grandmother's antique spinning wheel is used as a prop, which leaves it in a position to be captured by Rita's goons, who turn it into the evil Wheel Of Destruction. Can the Rangers put a stop to the giant wheel without ruining Kimberly's family heirloom?
28	"Peace, Love and Woe"	Robert Hughes	Julianne Klemm	August 14, 2010
Billy bumps into a brainy girl named Marge, and the two hit it off immediately. But Rita's ally, Madame Woe, mistakes Marge for a Power Ranger captures her. The Rangers come to her rescue, but can they save her, or will Billy remain dateless for the upcoming dance?
29	"Dark Warrior"	Terence H. Winkless	Jeff Deckman & Ronnie Sperling and Mark Hoffmeier	August 21, 2010
Fed up with being picked on by the likes of Bulk and Skull, Billy decides to re-enroll in Jason's Karate class. Meanwhile, Trini's Uncle Howard arrives to visit her. Howard is a scientist and also a very experienced martial artist. Rita, meanwhile, is more interested in Howard's new invisibility formula and sends a squad of putties to kidnap Howard and hold him for ransom. Rita's latest monster, the Dark Warrior is dispatched to fight the Ranger teens.
30	"The Rockstar"	Terence H. Winkless	Peggy Nicoll	August 21, 2010
Jason and his young cousin Jeremy become embroiled in a plot by Rita & Scorpina to capture the powerful Mirror of Destruction. At the same time, Zack takes the others on a driving trip outside Angel Grove. A Rockstar monster rounds out the cast. Jason is punched to the ground from this lobbing rock, and the others are recalled from holiday to rescue him. Jeremy finds the mirror can shatter putties.
31	"Calamity Kimberly"	Terence H. Winkless	Tom Wyner & Julianne Klemm	August 28, 2010
Kimberly wakes up on the wrong side of the bed and begins to have an extremely bad day. It worsens when Rita sends the Samurai Fan Man down to Earth. He traps the bad-haired, ratted-clothed, annoyed Kimberly inside an urn connected to another dimension. The Power Rangers race against the clock to free her before she's lost inside it forever.
32	"A Star is Born"	Terence H. Winkless	Cheryl Saban	August 28, 2010
While Tommy is busy competing with Bulk for a role on a Karate commercial, the other Rangers take to the beach for some fun in the sun. Rita takes a day off, leaving Goldar to send a double threat: the cocooning menace of Scorpina's pet worm, and the baseball-fevered Babe Ruthless!

=== Special (2023) ===
Title	Directed by	Written by	Original release date
Mighty Morphin Power Rangers: Once & Always	Charlie Haskell	Becca Barnes & Alwyn Dale	April 19, 2023
After Trini sacrifices herself to save Billy from a robotically revived Rita Repulsa, the team must grieve and regroup to face their old nemesis and two revived minions, Snizzard and Minotaur. The rangers must stop Robo Rita from abducting rangers and using their power to fuel a mysterious device. Trini's orphaned daughter, Minh (Charlize "Charlie" Kersh), learns what it means to be a hero as she prepares to fulfill her destiny and succeed her mother as the new Yellow Ranger. Notes: Dedicated to Thuy Trang and Jason David Frank. The special premiered on Netflix.

== Production ==
=== Conception ===
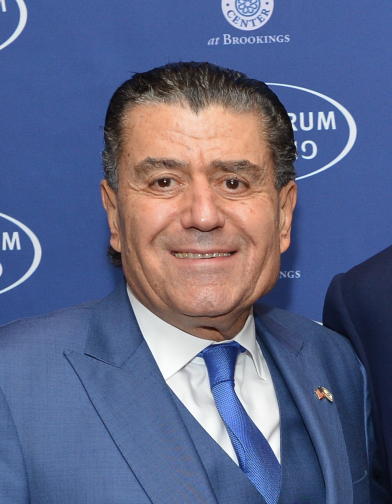
Haim Saban, who became inspired to create Power Rangers by Super Sentai, and who served as executive producer together with Shuki Levy.

While on a business trip to Japan, Haim Saban came across a broadcast of Choudenshi Bioman on TV Asahi, later learning of a popular French-language dub aired on Canal+. Based on the franchise's popularity both in and outside of its native country, Saban realized there was potential for an American adaptation. He and his business partner Shuki Levy quickly produced a pilot entitled Bio-Man in August 1986, which featured an early appearance by actor and martial artist Mark Dacascos in a leading role. According to Levy, they "shopped it around for at least five years, but nobody wanted it." Saban only found success in 1992, when he found a network executive familiar with Super Sentai, Fox Kids' Margaret Loesch, that during her time with Marvel Productions saw partner Stan Lee trying to sell the Sun Vulcan series to various television stations such as ABC, CBS, NBC, and HBO. Loesch's boss at Fox did not have much faith in the project, only financing a pilot that if unsuccessful, could even lead to Loesch's dismissal. Levy and Saban then began working on the pilot using footage from the latest Sentai season, Kyōryū Sentai Zyuranger, entitling the pitch Galaxy Rangers. A test screening with an audience of children was successful, and eventually, the pilot was picked up by Fox Kids for a 40-episode order, after which point it would be determined by the network whether or not to renew the series for additional episodes.

=== Casting ===
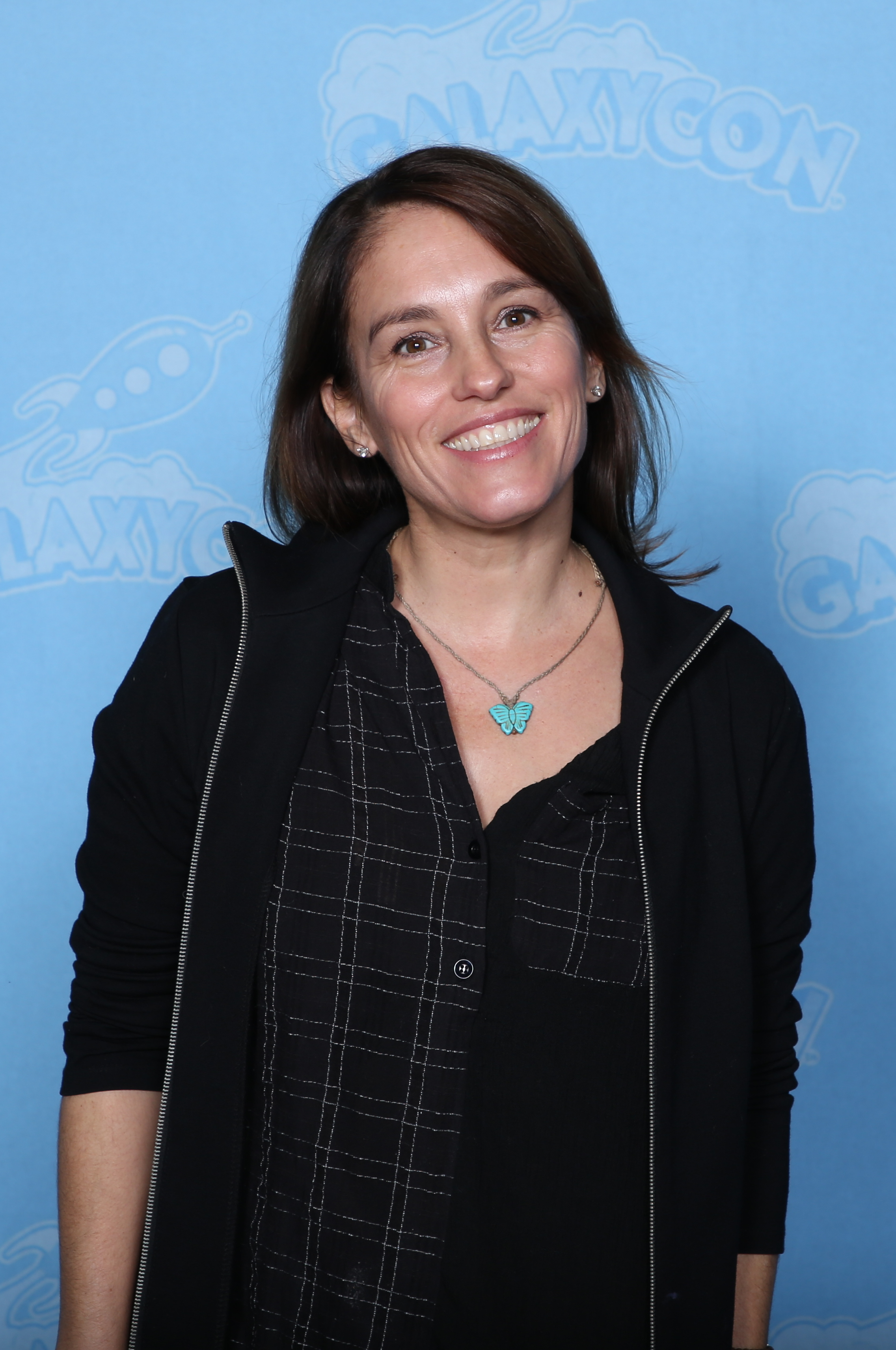
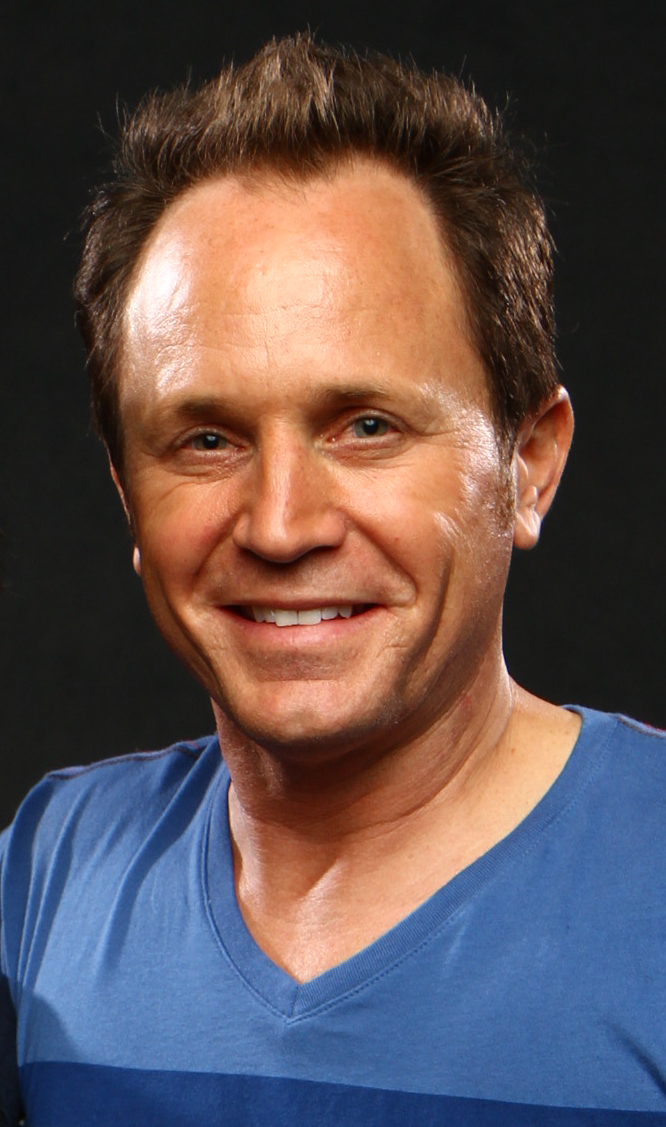
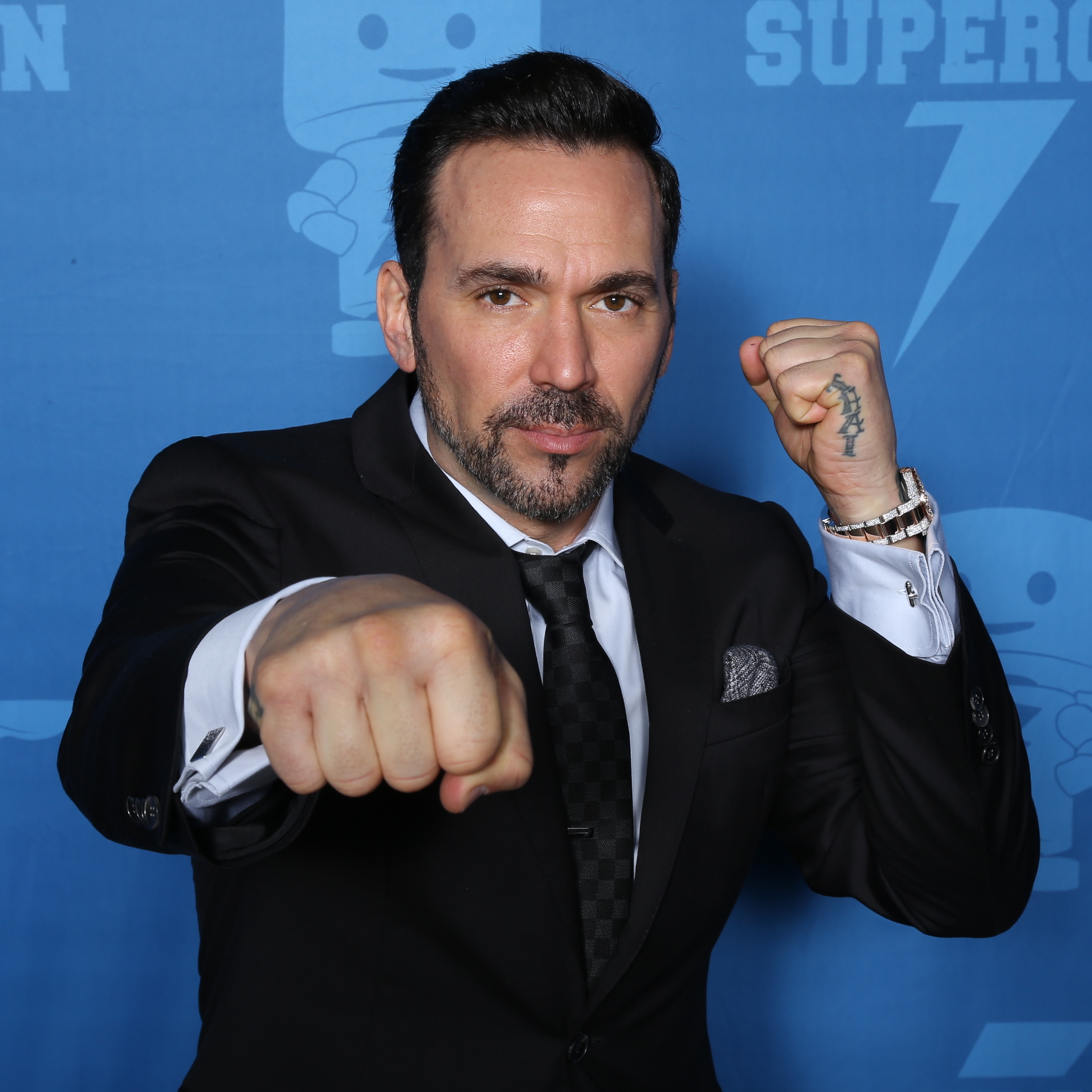
The three main cast members who appeared in all three seasons. From left to right and below: Amy Jo Johnson (Kimberly, who was replaced in the third season by Catherine Sutherland as Kat), David Yost (Billy) and Jason David Frank (Tommy).

Due to the action-oriented nature of the show, many of the lead actors cast had background in martial arts, dance, or other physically intensive activities. Amy Jo Johnson (Kimberly) and David Yost (Billy) were former competitive gymnasts, Austin St. John (Jason) held a second-degree black belt in Taekwondo, and a first-degree black belt in Judo. Walter Emanuel Jones (Zack) was a dancer and trained in Taekwondo, and Thuy Trang (Trini) was a kung fu practitioner. Actor Jason Narvy (Skull) originally auditioned for the role of Billy.

=== Filming ===
The series was shot on location in Santa Clarita and Los Angeles, California. Recurring locations included Grant High School, Placerita Canyon State Park, Puddingstone Reservoir, and Frank G. Bonelli Regional Park. The House of the Book at Brandeis-Bardin Institute was used as the exterior location for the Command Center. Due to its unusual, futuristic architecture; the building had previously been used in the films Star Trek VI: The Undiscovered Country and The Lawnmower Man.

As part of the initial licensing agreement between Saban and Toei Company, the producers of the Super Sentai, additional footage was filmed in the Greater Tokyo Area in Japan, and insert shots of the villain characters (particularly those played by Machiko Soga, Ami Kawai, and Hideaki Kusaka) were filmed in order to allow more in-depth, extensive scenes of the villains who would be unable to interact with the main cast due to the nature of the show. The additional footage included close-ups of the actor speaking English-language lines phonetically in order to make the necessary dubbing more seamless.

Episodes 39 & 40 (The two part episode Doomsday) were originally intended as the season (and potentially series) finale. According to Paul Schrier, the producers brought Machiko Soga in to film new footage, but she could not mouth the dialogue. Due to the unprecedented success of the show and its merchandising, Fox Kids ordered an additional 20 episodes. Since most of the available stock footage from Zyuranger had been depleted for use in the first 40 episodes of Season 1, Saban commissioned Toei to produce 25 new monster costumes and new battle footage using the existing Zyuranger suits. This new footage has been referred to as "Zyu2" by Power Rangers fans. Saban used 15 of the new monster costumes and their footage for the rest of Season 1 (episodes 41–60), then the remaining ten for the first 13 episodes of Season 2. This became problematic, however, when the Thunderzords were introduced, as they were from Gosei Sentai Dairanger, which resulted in Saban splicing together footage from both "Zyu2" and Dairanger for the Megazord battles in these early Season 2 episodes.

Following production of Season 2's first 20 episodes, Austin St. John, Thuy Trang and Walter Emanuel Jones left the show over contract disputes. To disguise this incident, a combination of body doubles, voice doubles and stock footage were used to continue featuring the characters Jason, Trini and Zack for eight episodes. The voice doubles were also used for the Ranger costume scenes in the last several episodes that the three actors filmed. The subplot of Jason, Trini and Zack leaving Angel Grove for the World Peace Conference was made to bridge the transition to their replacements.

During the later portion of Season 2 (following Rocky, Adam and Aisha's introduction to the series), the production moved to Sydney, Australia for roughly four months to shoot Mighty Morphin Power Rangers: The Movie, which was released the following summer before the start of Season 3.

== Reception and controversies ==
Mighty Morphin Power Rangers first aired in the United States on August 28, 1993. In three weeks it became the country's top-rated children's television series, remaining as such through to at least July 1994, and amassing 45% of the total viewing audience from the ages of six to eleven. Additionally, it achieved an average of 3.5 million young viewers on weekdays and 4.3 million on Saturday mornings; the first children's series to reach ratings as high since the animated Teenage Mutant Ninja Turtles two years prior. 35% of US viewers were female, though the majority appeared to be male. 33% of the show's Saturday audience consisted of adults. By December 1993, it had been sold to 72 countries worldwide.

=== Criticisms ===
==== Depictions of violence ====
Despite the success of the series, it was also the subject of much controversy, with some parents complaining that the show was too violent for young children. The show had aired before television stations issued content warnings such as parental guidance or fit for viewing persons twelve years or over, the V-chip, and television ratings. In the US, numerous complaints were sent to the Federal Communications Commission (FCC). In 1993, the Canadian broadcast rights to Mighty Morphin Power Rangers were jointly purchased by the YTV cable channel, and the series played to a receptive audience every weekday afternoon on YTV, the latter trailing the American broadcast by several months. However, due to complaints sent to the recently formed Canadian Broadcast Standards Council and a negative assessment from that body over the show's violent content, YTV removed the series from their line-up in November. Despite not actually being a member of the CBSC, YTV complied and pulled the series before the end of its first season; Global (which was a CBSC member) ultimately did the same. While a phone-in poll was conducted to see if viewers wanted MMPR back on YTV, no further installments of the Power Rangers franchise aired on the network until 2011's Power Rangers Samurai, although commercials for toys and videos were still advertised on it. Later Disney-era versions of the series were broadcast on ABC Family.

In 1994, the New Zealand Broadcasting Standards Authority (BSA) upheld several complaints from members of the public about the level of violence in the show. The main concern of those complainants was that the show portrayed violence as the primary means of resolving conflict, and that this was influencing children to behave more violently more frequently. Immediately following the BSA decision, the second season of the show was all but cancelled by Television New Zealand. New Zealand is the only country in the world where this show has been prematurely withdrawn from public broadcast to date. Video releases and the feature film were unaffected. Later series in the Power Rangers franchise, such as Power Rangers: Mystic Force and Power Rangers: Jungle Fury, were filmed in New Zealand, but the programs were still not shown on television in the country until 2011, when Samurai premiered.

In mid-October 1994, the murder of Silje Redergård by two of her young friends prompted Swedish-owned TV3 to pull MMPR from its broadcast schedule in all of its market countries. However, MMPR was not related to the event.

==== Poor work conditions ====
As a non-union production, members of the original cast were reportedly subject to low pay, long hours, unfair contracts, and a hostile work environment and, as many of the cast were young, aspiring actors, they had no agents or lawyers to protect their interests and they themselves had limited experience in the entertainment industry. Additionally, despite the show's financial success, members of the original cast did not receive royalty payments for re-runs of episodes in which they starred.

Austin St. John, Thuy Trang and Walter Emmanuel Jones were the first to leave the series, citing low pay, in the middle of the second season, and St. John was homeless for a time after leaving. While the reasons for their departure were debated for many years, St. John would confirm in 2014 that the departure was due to the low salaries the stars were being paid; he stated "I could have worked the window at McDonald's and probably made the same money the first season. It was disappointing, it was frustrating, it made a lot of us angry." The actors were receiving non-union pay, in the amount of about $60,000 per year without any compensation for merchandising for the show, which was estimated to be worth about $1 billion. Trang, St. John, and Jones were all represented by agent Ingrid Wang, and they requested more compensation and union recognition. Amy Jo Johnson, who left the series in the middle of the third season, later expressed regret that she and the other cast members did not join the three departing cast members in calling for union wages and recognition, wondering if all of them standing together may have led to a different result. According to Johnson, St. John, Jones and Trang had wanted the show to become unionized, leading to them being replaced by Steve Cardenas, Johnny Yong Bosch, and Karan Ashley, respectively.

Within the show, the actors' departure was explained by their characters being chosen as representatives in an international "Peace Conference" in Switzerland. Trang, St. John, and Jones released a joint statement about their departure:

After two seasons as the Power Rangers, we would now like to move forward to the many new opportunities that have been presented to us. Our Power Rangers experience will always remain an exciting and important part of our lives and careers, and it is gratifying that through our participation in the show, we were able to touch the lives of so many young people.

==== Allegations of homophobia ====
David Yost was the last of the original Ranger actors to leave the series (during Power Rangers Zeo), citing homophobic attitudes from production staff, prompting him to unsuccessfully undergo conversion therapy in an effort to change his sexuality. In a 2010 interview with fan blog "No Pink Spandex", Yost stated that he walked off set one day because he "was called 'faggot' one too many times." He also stated that the producers would often ask other cast members what they thought about his homosexuality, and this made him uncomfortable as well. Shortly after this interview, producer Scott Page-Pagter stated that Yost left over a pay dispute and that he didn't know why Yost made the allegations of homophobia; he further stated that Yost did not get along with any of the crew.

==== Other ====
In Malaysia, the series was simply known as Power Rangers as the word "morphin" was considered too similar to the name of the drug morphine.

== Awards and nominations ==
Year	Award	Category	Nominee	Result
1995	Daytime Emmy Awards	Outstanding Single Camera Photography	Ilan Rosenberg	Nominated

== Broadcast and home media ==
Reruns of Mighty Morphin Power Rangers were aired on networks such as Fox/ABC Family, Toon Disney (part of the Jetix block), ABC Kids and Kabillion.

=== 2010 re-version ===
In 2010, a new version of the series' first 32 episodes, with revised graphics and visual effects, was broadcast on ABC Kids, with Bandai producing a new product line to coincide with the release. It was the final Power Rangers season to air on ABC Kids, as Haim Saban re-acquired the franchise from Disney, who took over the rights in 2002. Beginning with Power Rangers Samurai in 2011, the franchise had moved to Nickelodeon.

Following the franchise's move to Nickelodeon, the show was shown on sister networks Nicktoons and TeenNick.

=== 2025 remaster ===
In 2025, Hasbro Entertainment released a digital upscale of the first season of the series, under the title Mighty Morphin Power Rangers: Re-Ignition. The upscaled episodes became available to view on YouTube, Tubi, The Roku Channel and Netflix, with Playmates Toys producing a kid-focused product line to coincide with the release.

=== VHS, DVD and streaming ===
Between 1994 and 1996, Saban Home Entertainment, in association with PolyGram Video and WarnerVision Entertainment, released videotapes of the series in the United States. In 2000, 20th Century Fox Home Entertainment released seven compilation VHS tapes. In 2012, Shout! Factory released 19 discs to Comic-Con International and a 20-disc set exclusively to Time Life of all three seasons and Mighty Morphin Alien Rangers. In that same year, Shout! Factory reissued the 19 discs to wider retail. They also released two volumes for both seasons 1 and 2 of the series, as well as the complete third season. In January 2014, the complete series, as well as the remaining 17 seasons in the entire Power Rangers franchise, was released in 98-disc set. The series has also been released on VHS in the UK and Australia, and Region 2 DVD. The first 30 episodes of season 1 have been released to Region 4 DVD.

As of 2025, the series is now streaming on Netflix, along with Ninja Steel, Ninja Super Steel, Dino Fury and Cosmic Fury, as well as the FAST/AVOD services Tubi, Pluto TV, Plex and The Roku Channel.

== Video games ==
The following video games are either based on the television series or feature characters from the series.

- Mighty Morphin Power Rangers (Super Nintendo Entertainment System, Game Boy) (1994)
- Mighty Morphin Power Rangers (Sega Genesis, Game Gear) (1994)
- Mighty Morphin Power Rangers (Sega CD) (1994)
- Mighty Morphin Power Rangers: The Movie (SNES, Genesis, Game Boy, Game Gear) (1995)
- Mighty Morphin Power Rangers: The Fighting Edition (SNES) (1995)
- Power Rangers: Super Legends (PlayStation 2, Nintendo DS) (2007)
- Mighty Morphin Power Rangers: Mega Battle (PlayStation 4, Xbox One) (2017)
- Power Rangers: Legacy Wars (iOS, Android) (2017)
- Power Rangers: Battle for the Grid (PlayStation 4, Xbox One, Nintendo Switch) (2019)
- Mighty Morphin Power Rangers: Rita's Rewind (PlayStation 4, PlayStation 5, Xbox One, Xbox Series X and Series S, Nintendo Switch, Windows) (2024)

=== Crossover appearances ===
In June 2024, the Mighty Morphin Power Rangers appeared in ARK: Survival Ascended through a collaboration content pack. The ARK x Power Rangers kit included Ranger character skins, dinosaur skins resembling Dinozords, and other themed items. A second wave of content released in February 2025 added additional skins for the Green Ranger, White Ranger, Lord Zedd, and Rita Repulsa, along with creature skins for Zords such as the White Tigerzord and Megazord.

In August 2025, characters from Mighty Morphin Power Rangers were featured in a crossover event in Fortnite Battle Royale, including skins for the Red, Black, Blue, Yellow, and Pink Rangers, plus the Green Ranger (with White Ranger as an alternate style) and villain Lord Zedd, along with a Dino Megazord item.

== Comic books ==
Several comic book series were based on Mighty Morphin Power Rangers. From 1994 to 1995, Hamilton Comics produced three separate series totaling 13 issues altogether. Marvel Comics produced two series, the first with seven issues based on the second season and the second with five issues called Mighty Morphin Power Rangers: Ninja Rangers/VR Troopers which was a flip book with adventures based on the third season on one side and of VR Troopers on the other. The Power Rangers also appeared in the Masked Rider comic book from Marvel.

In March 2016, BOOM! Studios released a new Mighty Morphin Power Rangers comic series, based on the original series but serves as a reboot taking place in the modern world. In July 2017, a second series titled Go Go Power Rangers was released and takes place before Tommy joins the team.

== Films ==
- Mighty Morphin Power Rangers: The Movie (1995)
- Turbo: A Power Rangers Movie (1997)
- Power Rangers (2017)
- Mighty Morphin Power Rangers: Once & Always (2023)

== See also ==
- Kyōryū Sentai Zyuranger
- Gosei Sentai Dairanger
- Ninja Sentai Kakuranger
