= David Yost =

American actor (born 1969)

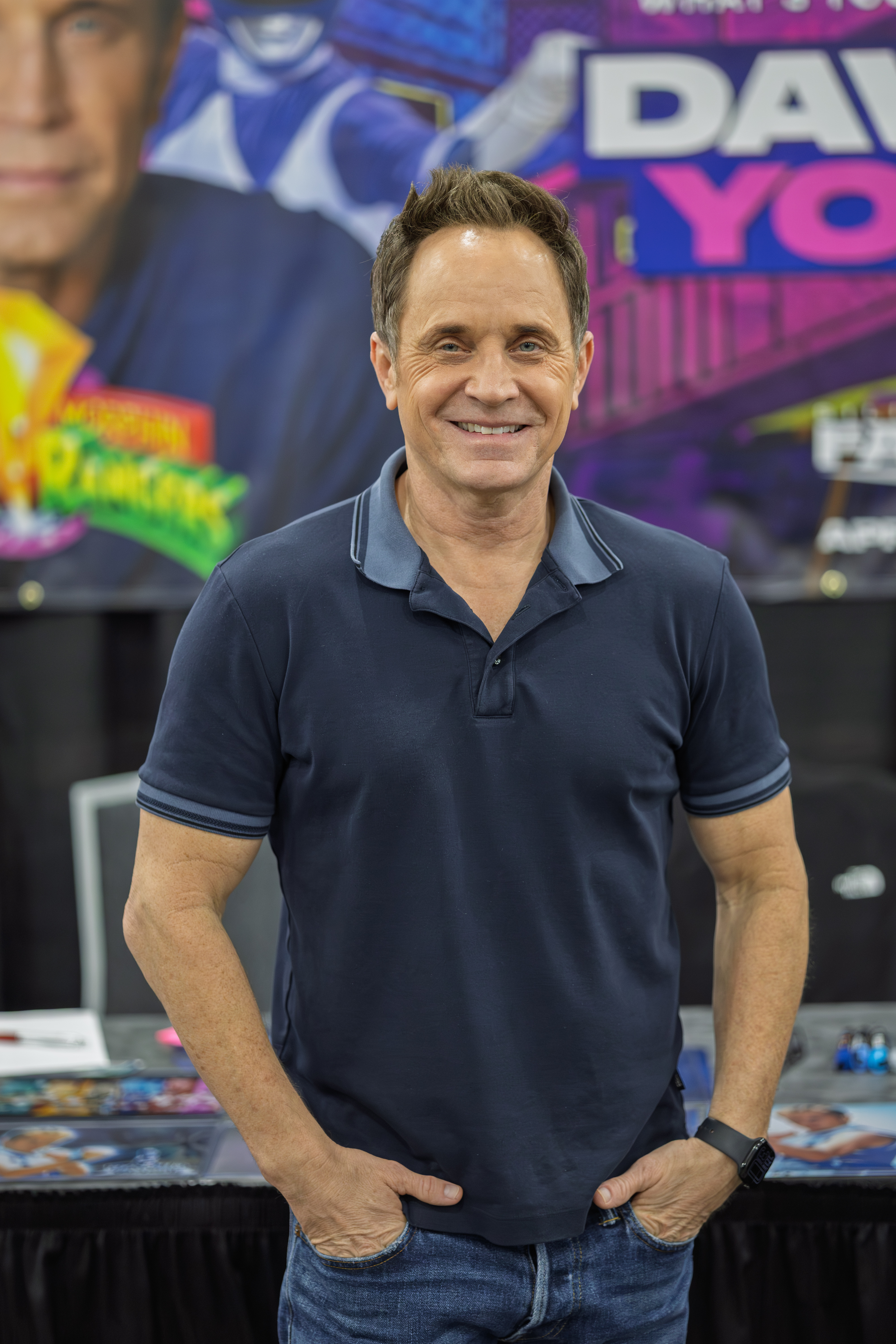
- Yost at Fandomcon San Jose in 2026
- Born: David Harold Yost; January 7, 1969 (age 57); Council Bluffs, Iowa, U.S.
- Education: Amador Valley High School
- Alma mater: Graceland University (BA)
- Occupations: Actor; producer
- Years active: 1993–present

David Harold Yost (/joʊst/; born January 7, 1969) is an American actor and producer. He is best known for portraying Billy Cranston in Mighty Morphin Power Rangers, Mighty Morphin Power Rangers: The Movie, Mighty Morphin Alien Rangers, Power Rangers Zeo, Mighty Morphin Power Rangers: Once & Always and Power Rangers Cosmic Fury.

== Early life ==
Yost was born in Council Bluffs, Iowa. He moved around the United States while winning many national gymnastics competitions, most notably the state championships in Iowa and Montana. In 1987, he graduated from Amador Valley High School in Pleasanton, California. In 1991, he graduated from Graceland University in Lamoni, Iowa with a Bachelor of Arts in communication and dramatic arts.

== Career ==
Yost moved to California with hopes of becoming an actor, and won the part of Billy Cranston (Blue Power Ranger) in the television series Mighty Morphin Power Rangers three months after arriving. He starred in almost 200 episodes of the show's first four seasons. He was the only cast member to appear in every single episode of the original series; his character never changed his colors or passed on his power coins to successors like the rest of the original cast. Yost's most high-profile work was his appearance in Mighty Morphin Power Rangers: The Movie (1995), which took in over $60 million at the box office. The film served as a non-canonical alternate opening for the third season.

After the show ended and Power Rangers Zeo began in the fourth season, Yost stayed on as Billy, but Billy's role within the show changed. Instead of his previous role as a Power Ranger, he became a technical advisor to the others. When asked about the change in a 2010 interview, Yost was evasive about how he'd personally felt about this but said he understood why the production team did it; he stated that Haim Saban was interested in the cast turnover of Super Sentai and believes that this was part of it. Yost left the show toward the end of the Power Rangers Zeo season. His character's final episode employed footage from previous episodes and voice work from an uncredited actor to conceal the fact that Yost was not present during the taping. A tribute to his character was seen in the closing credits of this episode.

While it was originally believed that he had left the series due to insufficient pay, Yost later revealed in a 2010 interview that he left because he could no longer handle harassment by members of the production crew who targeted him over his sexual orientation. According to Yost, he was often called a "faggot", and the producers frequently questioned other cast members in private about his sexuality. Yost left late in the fourth season after a week of contemplation and thoughts of suicide instead of continuing work another six months into the second film. He stated that the co-workers involved with writing, filming, and producing the show considered him "not worthy" to be where he was and that he "could not be a superhero" because of his homosexuality.

Scott Page-Pagter, a producer of the show starting with Power Rangers Zeo, responded through TMZ that Yost actually left over a pay bonus being dropped but did not elaborate further or dispute any of Yost's claims about the outside reasons for leaving the show. Saban Entertainment made no official statement regarding the subject. After Yost left the show, he attempted to change his sexual orientation with conversion therapy for two years. Eventually, he had a nervous breakdown that resulted in his psychiatric hospitalization for five weeks. After he checked out, he moved to Mexico for a year and eventually accepted his sexuality.

Yost starred as Josh White in the film Scene of the Crime (1996). He portrayed a Playboy photographer in the television film After Diff'rent Strokes: When the Laughter Stopped (2000). He was an associate producer for another television film, The Mary Kay Letourneau Story (2000). He first tried producing in 2001, working on the series Alien Hunter and Temptation Island. He worked as the director of production for Sci-Fi Lab, headed by the Sci-Fi Channel. He then became the manager of licensing for Geneon, where he sold television shows and films to such networks as Showtime, Starz, Encore, and Cartoon Network.

In 2002, Yost performed in a play called Fallen Guardian Angels in Los Angeles for AIDS Project Los Angeles. The play was about six actors dealing with HIV in various situations. The proceeds went to benefit The Children's Hospitals AIDS Center. The entire production raised over $25,000 and Yost himself raised $5,000 for the hospital, as well as receiving good reviews from LA Weekly Theater. In 2004, he worked as a field producer for the English documentary series You Are What You Eat. He appeared at the Anime Festival Orlando in Florida in August 2010. He has participated in the NOH8 Campaign. He appeared at Power Morphicon 2012 and 2014 in Pasadena, California along with his former co-stars. Yost appeared alongside his friend and former Power Rangers co-star, Amy Jo Johnson in one of Johnson's Stageit webcast shows in 2014. As of 2015, Yost remains on the convention circuit.

In 2016, Yost became co-owner of Affirmative Clothing along with Harlingen, Texas entrepreneurs Mason and Cris Andrade. Named after one of Billy's catch phrases, Affirmative has apparel with designs mostly inspired by Power Rangers, which Yost and the Andrade brothers first sold on conventions they attended.

In 2017, he starred in the short film The Order alongside other former Power Rangers co-stars.

In May 2018, shortly after Hasbro acquired the Power Rangers franchise, Yost (via Twitter) expressed his desire to help produce a Mighty Morphin Power Rangers reunion film for Netflix. In September 2022, it was announced that Yost was returning to the Power Rangers franchise for a 30th-anniversary special, accompanied by original Black Ranger actor Walter Emanuel Jones as well as former co-stars Steve Cardenas, Johnny Yong Bosch, Karan Ashley, and Catherine Sutherland. The special titled Mighty Morphin Power Rangers: Once & Always was released on April 19, 2023.

== Filmography ==
=== Film ===
Year	Title	Role	Notes
1995	Mighty Morphin Power Rangers: The Movie	Billy Cranston / Blue Power Ranger	
1996	Scene of the Crime	Josh White	Television film
2000	After Diff'rent Strokes: When the Laughter Stopped	Playboy Photographer	Television film Associate producer
2010	Degenerate	Marcus	Television film
2010	Who Ever Told You It Was Okay to Dream Anyway...?	Father at Picnic Table	Short film
2017	The Order	James	
2023	Mighty Morphin Power Rangers: Once & Always	Billy Cranston / Blue Ranger	30th Anniversary Special

=== Television ===
Year	Title	Role	Notes
1993–1995	Mighty Morphin Power Rangers	Billy Cranston / Blue Power Ranger	Starring role (153 episodes)
1994	Mighty Morphin Power Rangers: Alpha's Magical Christmas	Billy Cranston / Blue Power Ranger	Video short
1996	Power Rangers Zeo	Billy Cranston	Starring role (40 episodes)
1999	Power Rangers: The Lost Episode	Billy Cranston / Blue Ranger	Special episode (archival footage)
2000	The Mary Kay Letourneau Story		Associate producer
2001	Alien Hunter		Producer
2001	Temptation Island		Associate producer
2004	You Are What You Eat		Field producer
2010	The Real Housewives of Beverly Hills		Segment producer
2023	Power Rangers Cosmic Fury	Billy Cranston / Blue Ranger	Starring role (10 episodes)
