= Walter Emanuel Jones =

American actor

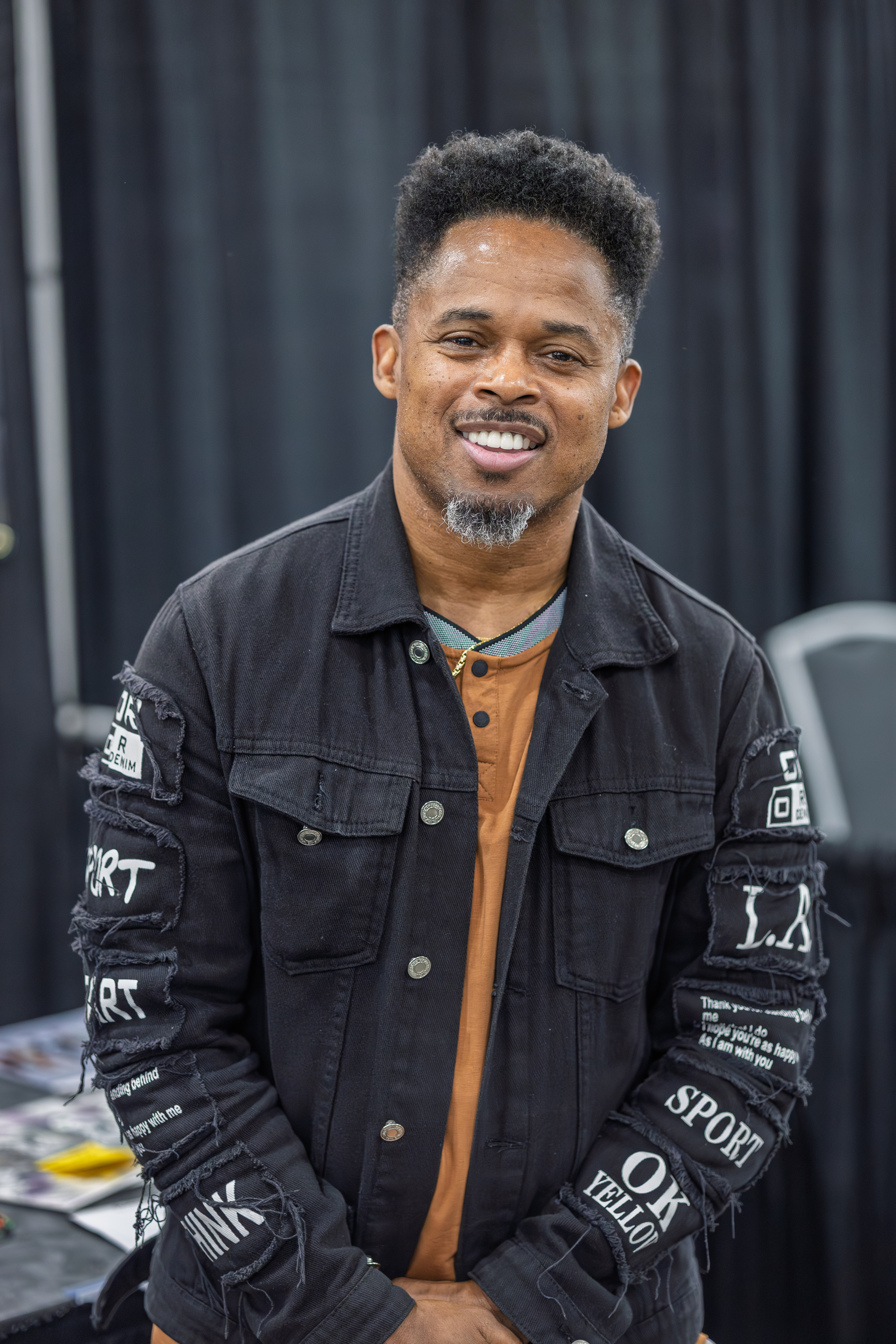
- Jones at Fandomcon San Jose in 2026
- Born: November 30, 1966 (age 59); Detroit, Michigan, U.S.
- Other names: Walter E. Jones; Tre Emanuel
- Occupations: Actor; martial artist; singer; dancer
- Years active: 1990–present

Walter Emanuel Jones, also known as Tre Emanuel, is an American actor, martial artist, singer and dancer, known for playing the role of Zack Taylor, the first Black Ranger on the hit television series Mighty Morphin Power Rangers.

He also appeared in successful television shows including Family Matters, Step by Step, Sabrina the Teenage Witch, Moesha, Buffy the Vampire Slayer, Early Edition, NYPD Blue, CSI: Crime Scene Investigation, Off Centre and The Shield.

He played in films including Backyard Dogs (2000), House of the Dead 2 (2005), Popstar: Never Stop Never Stopping (2016), House Party (2023), and Paper Made (2026).

He gave his voice talent to animated films including Open Season 2 (2008) and Cloudy with a Chance of Meatballs 2 (2013).

== Life and career ==
Jones was born and raised in Detroit. He lost the middle finger on his left hand in a firearm accident at the age of 4. He wanted to join the United States Air Force but was rejected based on having lost his finger. He began his career with an uncredited role in the successful TV show Beverly Hills, 90210. In 1992, he took part in Spike Lee's Malcolm X.

Jones played the character of Zack Taylor, the original "Black Power Ranger" in the Power Rangers series. He was written out of the series midway through the second season, after a contract and pay dispute, and was replaced by Johnny Yong Bosch as the Black Ranger. Jones returned to Power Rangers in the Lost Galaxy season (1999) where he played the voice of Hexuba's Nightmare Monster in the episode "Dream Battle"; he also acted in an episode of Power Rangers: Wild Force (2002) titled Forever Red in which many previous Red Rangers teamed up. Again, he did not appear as his original character, Zack, but rather provided the voice for one of the antagonists, a general in the Machine Empire named Gerrok. He was also one of the special commentators, along with fellow co-star Amy Jo Johnson, on the "1993" episode of I Love the '90s. He also reunited with Austin St. John (with whom he formed a close friendship during their time together on the show) as co-host for a special airing of the original pilot episode of Power Rangers called "The Lost Episode". In 2023, he reprised the role of Zack Taylor for the first time since leaving the show in 1994 in the Netflix special, Mighty Morphin Power Rangers: Once & Always, which celebrates the 30th anniversary of the Power Rangers franchise.

Jones was the very first actor to do voicework for any character other than a Ranger (mainly for monsters or villains) on a Power Rangers show after having a role as a Ranger himself. Other former Rangers who would do voicework after Jones included Archie Kao, Catherine Sutherland, Jason Faunt, Valerie Vernon, Sean Cw Johnson and Johnny Yong Bosch.

In 1996, Jones was a lead character in the teen drama Malibu Shores playing "Mouse". Jones also had major roles in the independent film The Dogwalker. He has appeared in other well-known productions, including a small part in Buffy the Vampire Slayer in the season 4 episode "Fear, Itself" and the Disney Channel Original Movie, Brink!. He also appeared as Harlan Band in the Nickelodeon series Space Cases, his second role as a main character and as a teenager. He guest starred in an episode of Family Matters as Kissel, and portrayed a supporting character in the first season of The Shield named Rondell Robinson, a drug dealer. He had a small role in the film Suckers in which he played a character named Clay. He also appeared in many successful TV shows including Family Matters, Step by Step, Sabrina the Teenage Witch, Moesha, Early Edition, NYPD Blue, CSI: Crime Scene Investigation and Off Centre. Additionally, he played a small role in the film House of the Dead 2 as "locker zombie".

Jones also had a major role in the backyard wrestling film Backyard Dogs, which spent time as the lowest-rated film on IMDb. As of July 2007, it is no longer on the list as it was straight-to-video. Jones voiced characters in the successful animated films Open Season 2 (2008) and Cloudy with a Chance of Meatballs 2 (2013).

He appeared briefly as a salsa dance instructor on Age of Love. He also appeared in Mighty Med and as a poet in an episode of Disney XD's Pair of Kings. Additionally Jones has also been featured in a PetSmart commercial and a Bank of America commercial as well. In 2002, he appeared in the film Love and a Bullet. In 2016, he appeared in the film Popstar: Never Stop Never Stopping and the short film Star Trek: Captain Pike.

In January 2019, he starred in The Order alongside Austin St. John, Catherine Sutherland, David Yost, Johnny Yong Bosch, Paul Schrier, Karan Ashley, Steve Cardenas, Erin Cahill, Blake Foster, Nakia Burrise, Hilary Shepard Turner, Dan Southworth, Alyson Sullivan, Deborah Estelle Phillips and Azim Rizk.

In 2021, he starred in the 7th episode of the second season of the series Boomerang. The same year, he acted in the dramatic film Memoirs of a Fighter alongside Eric Roberts and Tara Reid.

In 2023, he was one of the actors in the House Party. The film was released for VOD on January 31, 2023, and was released on Blu-ray and DVD on February 14, 2023. On June 11, 2023, he released his debut single "Dance" under the stage name "Tre Emanuel".

In 2026, Jones appeared as Craig Jenkins in Paper Made, a martial arts drama directed by Ryan Watson. Filmed in Tampa, Florida. The film premiered as AMC Westshore 14 in Tampa on August 28, 2026.

== Filmography ==
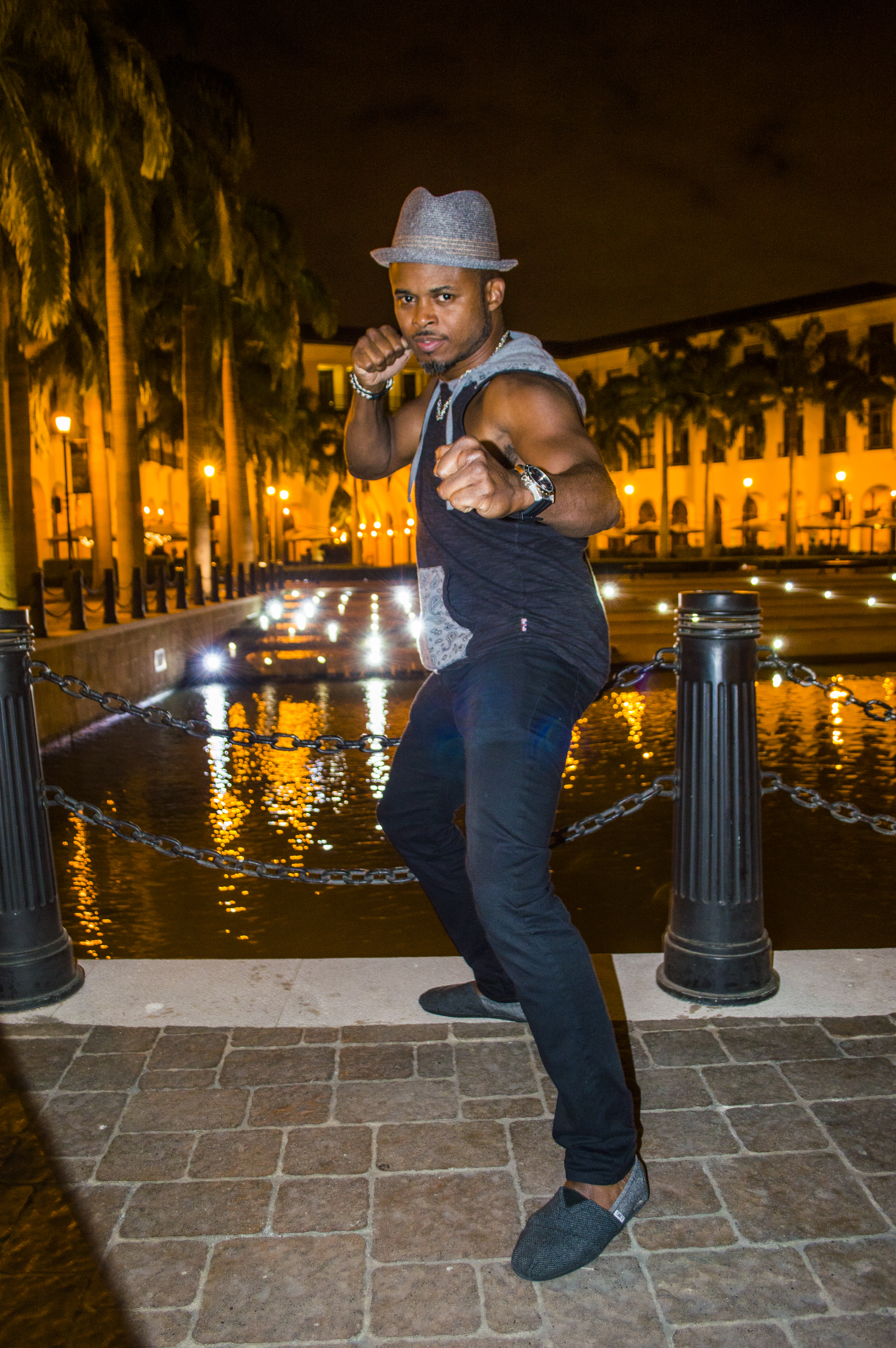
Jones in Guayaquil, Ecuador, in 2016

Films
Year	Title	Role	Notes
1992	White Men Can't Jump	Guy on Watts Sideline	Uncredited
1992	Malcolm X	Barber's Customer	
1998	Talisman	Jack Fine	
1998	The Gardener	Punk	
1998	Brink	Boomer	
2000	6Pat 2	Unknown	
2000	Backyard Dogs	Lee Takura	
2001	Suckers	Clay	
2002	American Gun	J.B.	
2002	Love and a Bullet	Cisko	
2002	Move	Chester / Chakou / Cyrus	
2005	House of the Dead 2	Locker Zombie	Uncredited
2008	Open Season 2	Unknown	Voice
2009	Steps Toward the Sun	Cowboy #2	
2012	Speed Demons	Terrance	
2013	Cloudy with a Chance of Meatballs 2	Additional Voices	
2016	Popstar: Never Stop Never Stopping	Angry Fan	
2016	Star Trek: Captain Pike	Captain Sean Davis	
2017	The Order	Cole	
2018	Miller's Justice League Mortal	Documentary	
2023	House Party	Himself	Cameo
2023	Mighty Morphin Power Rangers: Once & Always	Zack Taylor / Black Ranger	30th Anniversary Special
2026	Paper Made	Craig Jenkins	

Television
Year	Title	Role	Notes
1990	Beverly Hills, 90210	Guy in Hall	
1993–1994	Mighty Morphin Power Rangers	Zack Taylor / Black Power Ranger	Starring role (79 episodes)
1994	Mighty Morphin Power Rangers: Alpha's Magical Christmas	Zack Taylor / Black Power Ranger	Video short (archival footage)
1995	Step by Step	Joe	
1995	The Parent 'Hood	Jared King	
1995	Family Matters	Kissel	
1996	Malibu Shores	Michael "Mouse" Hammon	10 episodes
1996–1997	Space Cases	Harlan Band	Main role, 27 episodes, 2 seasons
1997	The Burning Zone	Marcus Dawson	
1997	Sabrina, the Teenage Witch	Dolrimple	
1998	Brink!	"Boomer"	Television film (Disney Channel)
1999	Early Edition	"Crazy H"	
1999	Mutinerie	"Shorty"	Television film
1999	In the House	Walter	
1999	Buffy the Vampire Slayer	Edward	
1999	Power Rangers Lost Galaxy	Nightmare Monster	Voice
1999	Power Rangers: The Lost Episode	Himself / Zack Taylor	Co-host / Co-star (original pilot)
2000	NYPD Blue	Raymond Young	
2001	Moesha	Jay	2 episodes
2001	Spyder Games	Dean	4 episodes
2002	Off Centre	"Cheddar"	
2002	CSI: Crime Scene Investigation	Street Racer	
2002	Power Rangers Wild Force	Gerrok	Voice
2002	Rapsittie Street Kids: Believe In Santa	Ricky Rogers	Voice, television film
2003	The Shield	Rondell Robinson	4 episodes
2011	Prime Suspect	Randall Hughes	
2012	Pair of Kings	"Tough Poet"	
2013	Mighty Med	Doctor	
