= Tommy Oliver =

Dr. Tommy Oliver
- Power Rangers character
- Jason David Frank as Tommy Oliver.
- First appearance: Mighty Morphin Power Rangers: October 05, 1993 (episode 1.17: "Green with Evil, Part I: Out of Control")
- Based on: Dragon Ranger Burai from Kyōryū Sentai Zyuranger
- Portrayed by: Jason David Frank; Michael Gotto (child)
- Voiced by: Vegas Trip (Dino Thunder tie-in game); Jeffrey Parazzo (Power Rangers S.P.D.; uncredited); Patrick Seitz (Super Megaforce tie-in game; as Mighty Morphin Green Ranger); Johnny Yong Bosch (Super Megaforce tie-in game; as Red Zeo Ranger); Jason David Frank (Battle for the Grid; as Mighty Morphin Green Ranger and Lord Drakkon); James Willems (Rita's Rewind)

In-universe information
- Title(s): Green Power Ranger; White Power Ranger; White Ninja Ranger; Zeo Ranger V Red; Red Turbo Ranger (I); Black Dino Ranger
- Spouse: Katherine "Kat" Hillard
- Children: JJ Oliver (son)
- Origin: Earth
- Color(s): Green (MMPR S1–S2); White (MMPR S2–S3); Red (Zeo and Turbo); Black (Dino Thunder)
- Zords: Dragonzord; Tigerzord; Falconzord; White Shogunzord; Zeozord V Red Battlezord; Super Zeozord V Red Lightning Turbozord; Black Brachiozord

Dr. Thomas "Tommy" Oliver is a fictional character in the American live-action television franchise Power Rangers. He is best known as being the original Green Ranger and the first evil Ranger who fought and nearly defeated the original Power Rangers while under the control of Rita Repulsa. He was eventually freed from Rita's spell and aligned himself with the other Power Rangers.

He is a main character in the Mighty Morphin Power Rangers TV series, as well as four of its successive incarnations Mighty Morphin Alien Rangers, Power Rangers Zeo, Power Rangers Turbo, and Power Rangers Dino Thunder (where he returns as a legendary Power Ranger veteran). He also appeared in the Power Rangers Wild Force episode "Forever Red", the Power Rangers S.P.D. episode "Wormhole", the Power Rangers Super Megaforce episode "Legendary Battle", and in the Power Rangers Super Ninja Steel episode "Dimensions in Danger". He was portrayed by actor Jason David Frank in all of his appearances from the beginning of the franchise until his death in November 2022, with the exception of the episode "Wormhole", where he appeared only in Ranger form and was voiced by actor Jeffrey Parazzo (who played Trent Mercer in Dino Thunder). He was also infrequently portrayed by actor Michael Gotto in instances where the story required the character during childhood, such as in the series Mighty Morphin Alien Rangers.

According to the character's history, Tommy is a legend among the Power Rangers community and is considered to be the greatest Power Ranger of all time, having been six different Power Rangers — The Green Ranger, The White Ranger, The White Ninja Ranger, Zeo Ranger V – Red, The Red Turbo Ranger, and The Black Dino Ranger — and a part of four Ranger teams over the years. In addition, Tommy is a lifelong practitioner of the martial arts; during the first season of Power Rangers, he was referred to as having a third-degree black belt in karate. By Power Rangers Dino Thunder, he is a 6th degree black belt. ("Return of the Ranger", Power Rangers Dino Thunder – Collision Course DVD). Tommy serves as a love interest to the original Pink Ranger Kimberly Hart before their separation. He later pursues a relationship with Kimberly's successor Kat Hillard.

== Fictional character history ==
=== Mighty Morphin Power Rangers ===
==== As the Green Ranger ====
Three of Tommy's personas, appearing before him in a vision in the Power Rangers Dino Thunder episode "Fighting Spirit".

Tommy Oliver is first introduced in the Mighty Morphin Power Rangers five-part episode "Green With Evil" as a new student at Angel Grove High School. After he spars with Jason Lee Scott (Red Power Ranger) in a martial arts tournament, they begin to develop a friendship, and he catches the eye of both Kimberly Hart (Pink Power Ranger) and the evil witch Rita Repulsa. Rita decides to enchant Tommy to be her loyal servant, granting him the Dragon Power Coin to give him the power to morph into the evil Green Power Ranger. Unlike the other Power Rangers, his outfit includes a golden chest shield, two golden armbands, triangles instead of diamonds on the gloves and boots, and his power morpher was golden instead of silver. Tommy was the only ranger to also lack a blade blaster and instead carry his main weapon, The Dragon Dagger or Dragon Flute in his holster, which was black instead of white, at all times which had the ability to call on his zord. While under Rita's spell, Tommy was completely under her control and followed every command given. He was also significantly stronger than the other Rangers and could fire powerful energy blasts from his hands. To ensure Tommy's loyalty, Rita granted him the Sword of Darkness which not only made him more powerful but also made her spell indefinite unless the sword was destroyed.

She orders him to destroy the Power Rangers and their guardian Zordon so she may be able to conquer the Earth unopposed. He succeeds in his mission, dispatching Zordon, destroying the Power Rangers' Command Center, and infecting the robot Alpha 5 with a computer virus, leaving the Rangers defenseless against attacks, but they are still able to ward him off with the Megazord. With the return of Goldar's wife Scorpina, the two wreak havoc in Angel Grove, leading the Power Rangers to use the Megazord once more, only to be attacked by Goldar, Scorpina, and the Green Ranger at once, putting the Megazord out of commission when it is thrown into the Earth's core.

After this battle, the Power Rangers discover that their foe is none other than their classmate Tommy. After Tommy escapes, he is given the Dragon Dagger to summon the Dragonzord to attack the city. Zordon is revived and reveals the Power Rangers' Dinozords have been restored by the Earth's lava, allowing them to counter the Dragonzord's attack. The Red Ranger is then able to battle the Green Ranger one-on-one, and destroys the Sword of Darkness, freeing Tommy from Rita's spell. Zordon then offers Tommy a spot on the team to atone for his misdeeds, and he agrees.

In the original draft script for the Green Dream, Lord Zedd claims the Sword of Power was created from the remains of the Sword of Darkness. This is also stated by the announcer's intro to The Green Dream episode claiming it to be the Sword of Darkness.

During his time with the group, Tommy recognizes Kimberly's feelings, having broken her heart while he was under Rita's spell, and he now begins to show affections for her. However, Rita's plan to use the evil Green Candle to get revenge on Tommy for leaving her employ, weakening Tommy, just as Kimberly returns his affections. Tommy is captured by Goldar and kept imprisoned in the Dark Dimension as the Green Candle burns down, draining him of his strength, due to the fact that Tommy's presence within the proximity of the Candle accelerates the Candle's burning process. Tommy is ultimately freed, but not before the Green Candle burns through completely. His powers nearly gone, after using them in one final battle with a powerful monster, he decides to give the Dragon Coin to Jason, permanently preventing Rita from attaining its power once more while allowing Jason to use Tommy's weapons and the Dragonzord. Tommy then leaves Angel Grove to recover from the endeavour.

After Rita kidnaps all of the parents of the students of Angel Grove High School, the Power Rangers are forced to pay her ransom with their Power Coins, preventing them from using their powers. When they are double-crossed, and Rita acquires the Dragon Dagger by enchanting Billy Cranston, all seems hopeless, but Jason reveals he still has the Dragon Power Coin. The group finds Tommy once more, and with help from Zordon, Tommy is able to morph into the Green Ranger and retrieve the Power Coins and Dragon Dagger. However, his powers are now unstable and he requires constant energy boosts from Zordon in order to maintain his place as the Green Ranger.

With the arrival of the evil Lord Zedd in season 2, the other Power Rangers are given new Thunderzords to battle his stronger monsters, but because of Tommy's unstable power reserves, the Dragonzord cannot be empowered into a new form. While under a spell Tommy suggests that if he had the Sword of Power that might increase his powers. When the other rangers agree they summon the Sword of Power together and Tommy's evil spell was revealed. The spell wears off and Tommy fights Robogoat to recover the Sword of Power. With this knowledge in mind, Lord Zedd sends several energy draining monsters to steal the Green Ranger's powers to the point where Zordon can no longer safely maintain himself and the Green Ranger. This culminates in the attack of the monster Turbanshell, who drains Tommy of his Green Ranger powers, trapping everyone in the Otherworld dimension, while charging the Dark Crystal to power Lord Zedd's evil Dark Rangers to attack the Earth. Tommy uses the last of his powers to destroy the Dark Crystal, ending the reign of terror of the Dark Rangers and allowing the others to defeat Turbanshell. With his powers gone once again, Tommy leaves Angel Grove, again, spending time at his uncle's lakeside cabin.

==== As the White Ranger ====
In season 2's two-part "White Light" saga, Lord Zedd sends his monsters Nimrod, A.C., and D.C. to attack, who easily overpower the Power Rangers, leading Zordon and Alpha to come up with a plan to recruit a new Ranger. Initially the teens are put off at the idea of a newcomer out of their loyalty to Tommy, but are thrilled once they discover that it is actually Tommy himself, who has now become the White Power Ranger with his powers created by the Light of Goodness, which are unable to be stolen by the forces of evil. Unlike other Power Rangers, his costume includes a black and golden shield as well as a golden belt, golden bands instead of diamonds on the gloves and boots, a completely white suit without the diamond on the chest and the mouthpiece on his helmet lacks sculpted lips. After being installed as the team's new leader (also becoming the main protagonist), Tommy goes into battle using his new powers to defeat the monsters, including summoning the Tigerzord with his talking saber Saba. Tommy then meets Rocky DeSantos, Adam Park and Aisha Campbell as they were trying to save a baby who belongs to their teacher.

After Rocky, Adam and Aisha discover Tommy's identity as the White Ranger while Tommy and Kimberly were trying to save Billy by removing his helmet, Jason, Zack and Trini were called to the peace conference in Switzerland as Tommy transfers their powers to Rocky, Adam and Aisha and allows them to join the team. Tommy later contends with a clone of his named "Tom", created and controlled by Lord Zedd's Wizard of Deception, who is given the powers of the Green Ranger, restored by using portion of the White Ranger's powers. With his worst fear from his past brought to life in front of him, Tommy battles Tom, initially seeks to destroy his clone under distress but he later recognizes that Tom is actually not evil but under the Wizard's spell as he was under Rita's, and then fights to save him. After the Wizard of Deception is destroyed during a series of battles that sends everyone back to the colonial era, Tom is freed from the spell and given free will. Tommy persuades his clone to fight to save people, and Tom decides to remain in the past to protect colonial Angel Grove despite Tommy offering Tom to join the Power Rangers, while the others return to the present time. Tom also keeps the Green Ranger powers.

==== As the White Ninja Ranger ====
In season 3, Rita's brother Rito Revolto comes to Earth and manages to destroy the Rangers Zords and Power Coins. After the group seeks out the Power Coins' creator Ninjor, he grants the team new Ninja Power Coins, and Tommy as the White Ninja Ranger receives the Falcon Power Coin and the new Falconzord. Later, Tommy meets Kat Hillard, who has been enchanted by Rita into serving her, resulting in Kimberly's powers being stolen as well as the Falconzord. When Kimberly is kidnapped by Kat and Goldar, the Power Rangers are forced by Lord Zedd to use the Shogunzords to destroy the Earth or Kimberly will be harmed. While Billy manages to take control of the Zords away from Zedd, Tommy saves Kimberly and Kat by freeing her from Rita's spell. When Kimberly is given the option to train for the Pan Global Games, she decides to give her powers to Kat, and she and Tommy keep a long-distance relationship. He and Kat also developed a close friendship due to their similar experiences with Rita; however, he is unaware that Kat is in love with him. The Falconzord is ultimately retrieved in time for Rita and Rito's father Master Vile's arrival on Earth, and the Rangers are able to use their new Metallic Armor to battle him. It is during this time that Tommy is tasked with retrieving the Zeo Crystal from beneath Rita and Zedd's palace, as only a being of pure heart can pass through its force field and survive. Tommy manages to traverse the Caves of Deception to find the Zeo Crystal, and the team uses their powers to split it into five pieces and send it to different parts of history so Master Vile can never use its powers to harm the Earth.

=== Mighty Morphin Alien Rangers ===
In the events of Mighty Morphin Alien Rangers, Tommy, the other Power Rangers, and all of Angel Grove are sent back in time by Master Vile's Orb of Doom, reverting the Power Rangers to children. While the Aquitian Rangers protect the Earth from Master Vile's monsters, Billy manages to create a device to restore them to their original age, using their six Ninja Power Coins to power it. Billy is restored to his original age, but the machine is stolen by Rito and Goldar, and Rita and Zedd destroy the Ninja Power Coins. The five child Power Rangers are sent through time to retrieve the pieces of the Zeo Crystal. Tommy is sent to a point in the past on Native American land, where he meets Sam Trueheart who leads him to a test where he must find the Red Sub-Crystal amongst two fakes. After succeeding, Tommy returns to the present time, but not before Sam gives him half of an arrowhead pendant.

=== Power Rangers Zeo ===
During Power Rangers Zeo, time is restored to normal and Tommy, with Kat, Rocky, Adam, and new friend Tanya Sloan replacing Aisha Campbell who chose to stay in Africa, is given the powers of the Zeo Crystal and the Zeo Rangers protect the Earth from the Machine Empire. Tommy remains the team's leader and is assigned to be the Red Zeo Ranger. Later, Kimberly, while she is living in Florida for the Pan Global Games, sends Tommy a Dear John letter, ending their relationship. Kat attempts to find a new girlfriend for Tommy despite her feelings for him, but their duties as Power Rangers prevent any relationship from blossoming. Ultimately, Tommy and Kat begin dating. A holiday special during the season shows an elderly Tommy and Kat entertaining their granddaughter, and their teenaged grandson, who is hinted to be a Power Ranger. When the Zeo Megazord is heavily damaged, Tommy is given the Red Battlezord to control with his mind. Unable to control his emotions to use the Red Battlezord, Tommy goes on a spiritual journey to find peace of mind, and meets up with his long-lost twin brother David Truehart (portrayed by Jason David Frank's real brother Erik Frank). He too possesses half of an arrowhead pendant, and he reveals to Tommy that if the two halves are joined the holder could use the spirits trapped within them to control a darkness powerful enough to destroy the world. When David is captured by King Mondo, Tommy frees him, and under the stress of protecting his brother from the Machine Empire who will not leave as they are both in trouble, he reveals his identity as a Power Ranger to him. When the Rangers' ally Trey of Triforia can no longer sustain his Gold Ranger powers after a battle, Tommy recruits Jason, who has returned from Switzerland to be the new temporary Gold Ranger, reuniting the old friends. This proves useful when Tommy is brainwashed by the Machine Empire's Prince Gasket into thinking his friends are a threat to the world, as Jason and Kat are able to return Tommy to his senses. Jason leaves when Trey's health is restored.

=== Power Rangers Turbo ===
Tommy as the Red Turbo Ranger

In Turbo: A Power Rangers Movie, Tommy and Kat are sent to save the wizard Lerigot from the evil Space Pirate Divatox, who plans on wedding Maligore, a powerful monster, in order to take over the world. With their Zeo Ranger powers not strong enough, Tommy, with the other Power Rangers—and new member Justin Stewart replacing Rocky DeSantos due to a recent back injury—are given new powers to morph into the Turbo Rangers, with Tommy still serving as team leader as the Red Turbo Ranger. They use their new powers to save Jason and Kimberly, who have been kidnapped by Divatox as sacrifices for Maligore.

In Power Rangers Turbo, as he and his friends graduate from high school, Tommy becomes interested in stock car racing. The group also deals with the Blue Senturion who has been tricked by Divatox into thinking the Rangers are evil and preventing him from telling the Rangers the Millennium Message, a warning that the forces of evil are joining out in space. After Zordon and Alpha 5 leave the Earth to deal this threat, the team's new guardian Dimitria eventually judges that Tommy, along with Kat, Adam, and Tanya, has fulfilled their duties as defenders of the Earth. In the episode "Passing the Torch", Divatox's mother Mama D convinces her that taking out Tommy will cause the fall of the rest of Power Rangers. Their new allies T.J. Johnson and Cassie Chan manage to help Kat fend off the Pirahantrons, and save Tommy from Divatox and Mama D's plans, resulting in Tommy (who is leaving for MIT university to become a teacher) deciding that T.J. should be his successor as the new Red Turbo Ranger.

=== Power Rangers Wild Force ===
Five years after Tommy gave his powers to T.J., Tommy returns in the Power Rangers Wild Force episode "Forever Red", where he is shown to own a resort with Bulk and Skull. Tommy leads a team made up of former Red Power Rangers, recruiting the current Red Ranger Cole Evans to help stop remnants of the Machine Empire from resurrecting Lord Zedd's evil Zord Serpentera and attack the Earth. Tommy uses his Zeo Ranger powers to combat the enemies.

=== Power Rangers Dino Thunder ===
Tommy as the Black Dino Ranger.

Between the events in Turbo and Power Rangers Dino Thunder, Tommy earns a PhD in paleontology at MIT. He also meets Hayley Ziktor and goes into business as partners with Terrence "Smitty" Smith and Dr. Anton Mercer, who together work on research that results in the creation of the Tyrannodrones, Raptor Riders, and the new Dinozords. A lab accident turns Mercer into the evil Mesogog, and Smitty is left for dead, until he is revived by Mesogog into the cyborg Zeltrax. It is during these events that Tommy discovers the Dino Gems, hiding them in his lab, and the location of the Shield of Triumph. While Mesogog gains control of the Tyrannodrones, Tommy keeps the Raptor Riders and Dinozords, working with Hayley to create equipment to harness the Dino Gems' powers, while he gets a job at Reefside High School as a science teacher. Three of his students who received detention—Conner McKnight, Ethan James, and Kira Ford—discover his lab and use three of the Dino Gems to become the new Dino Thunder Power Rangers.

Tommy mentors the group, keeping his past secret, until he discovers the monsters attacking Reefside are controlled by Mesogog. His three students soon discover the man they know as "Dr. O" was one of the previous Power Rangers, a fact that Hayley corrects them on by saying that he was one of the best. Tommy, using the powers of the Black Dino Gem, joins the group as the Black Dino Ranger, controlling the Brachiozord and gaining the power of invisibility.

When the White Dino Ranger appears, Tommy's dedication to saving the lives of innocents seems to give the latter cause to show no mercy to him, even after he discovers that the White Dino Ranger is Trent Fernandez-Mercer, Anton's adoptive son. For a while, Tommy is encased in amber by the White Dino Ranger, and once freed, finds himself unable to de-morph, due to his Dino Gem and his morpher re-molecularizing. He remains in his morphed form for a while. Despite this resolve, he cannot help but feel sympathy for Trent when Conner and Ethan did not, reminding the others of his tenure as the evil Green Power Ranger. After seeing the power of the White Ranger Clone and the Terrorsaurus, Tommy decides that the Rangers need an upgrade. He takes Trent to the location of the Shield of Triumph, as the shield can only be freed from its resting place by the power of Trent's Dino Gem. The Shield is then used by Conner to become the Triassic Ranger, just as a prophecy Tommy had read during its discovery foretold.

Tommy is later freed from his permanently morphed status by a special substance, but is rendered invisible. He decides to run an experiment to return himself to normal, but it shatters the Black Dino Gem and leaves him comatose. In his subconscious, he battles against his previous Power Ranger alter-egos: Zeo Ranger V, the White Power Ranger, and then the Green Power Ranger. After proving that he will not give up the fight for his life, his inner selves each offer him a shattered piece of his Dino Gem, restoring him to full health and allowing him to attain Super Dino Mode when morphed. During his mentoring of the Dino Thunder Rangers, Tommy notes similarities in his past in Conner, placing a lot of trust into him. His mentoring of Conner through a point where the young man doubts himself, allows Conner to overcome these feelings and gain the Battlizer.

When Tommy learns that Trent has been keeping his father's identity as Mesogog secret, Tommy considers removing Trent from the team. Although he comes to terms with Trent's loyalty to his father, he asks the others if Trent should stay, and they agree when Trent saves Conner's life. In the final battles against Zeltrax and Mesogog, having been liberated from sharing a body with Anton Mercer, Tommy informs the Rangers that they must give up their powers in order to save the world. Zeltrax is destroyed with the destruction of the Dinozords, and the Rangers give up their Dino Gems to stop Mesogog for good. In the end, Tommy decides to pursue his life after Mesogog's destruction as a normal high school science teacher.

=== Later appearances ===
The character of Tommy Oliver is not present during the Power Rangers S.P.D. episode "History", in which Conner, Kira, and Ethan go to their high school reunion in 2005, wondering if Tommy will arrive, only to be taken into the future by the S.P.D. Power Rangers' foe Broodwing. Tommy does return in the episode "Wormhole" when Emperor Grumm travels back in time to take over the Earth without S.P.D.'s interference, only to encounter the Dino Rangers. According to S.P.D. Red Ranger Jack Landors, Tommy's services as a Power Ranger are well known in the future. In this episode, Jason David Frank didn't reprise his role as Tommy Oliver, and as such only appears morphed. He was instead voiced by Jeffrey Parazzo, who also portrays Trent.

Although he doesn't appear on screen in the Power Rangers Operation Overdrive two-part episode "Once a Ranger", Kira mentions how Tommy would have enjoyed seeing the Operation Overdrive Power Rangers' base of operations, with Adam noting his incredulity that Tommy received a doctorate.

==== Power Rangers Super Megaforce ====
Jason David Frank reprised the role of Tommy Oliver in Power Rangers Super Megaforce. Tommy is first seen using Saba, the White Ranger's sword, to rescue a boy from a car wreck caused by the Armada's invasion. Later he is seen leading the team of Legendary Rangers, wielding his original Green Ranger powers, to aid the Megaforce Rangers in defeating the Armada.

==== Power Rangers Ninja Steel ====
In the Power Rangers Super Ninja Steel episode Dimensions in Danger — marking the 25th anniversary of Power Rangers — Tommy is captured by Lord Draven and replaced with a robot duplicate who traps several other past Rangers, including Kat and Rocky. He escapes and joins the Ninja Steel Rangers, Wes Collins, Gemma and Koda in rescuing the other Rangers. Tommy defeats his robot duplicate using the Master Morpher — a modified Power Morpher that allows him to access any of his previous Ranger forms — to call on the powers of Dino Thunder Black, Zeo Red and Mighty Morphin White and Green Rangers. As Lord Draven attempts to destroy the multiverse, the freed Legendary Rangers join the Ninja Steel Rangers in defeating Draven's army and Tommy summons the Falconzord to thwart Draven's final strike. The episode implies that Tommy and Kat are in a relationship and introduces Tommy's son, J.J.

Dimensions in Danger marks the final live-action appearance of Jason David Frank in Power Rangers before his death in 2022.

==== Mighty Morphin Power Rangers: Once & Always ====
The 2023 Netflix special, Mighty Morphin Power Rangers: Once & Always, marking 30 years of Power Rangers, shows Tommy (as the Green Ranger) fighting alongside the other original Mighty Morphin' Power Rangers against Robo-Rita - the resurrected evil spirit of Rita Repulsa inhabiting a robot body. The battle culminates in Rita retreating after causing the death of Yellow Ranger, Trini.

One year later, Robo-Rita reappears with two of her resurrected monsters Robo-Minotaur and Robo-Snizzard. The latter captures Tommy, Jason, and Kimberly. Robo-Rita plans to drain their energy to power a time machine allowing her to contact her past self and alter the timeline in her favor. Billy and Zack lead a team with former rangers Kat and Rocky and Trini's daughter Minh - who has inherited her mother's powers - to rescue the captured Rangers and defeat Rita for good. This special confirms that Kat is J.J.'s mother and that she and Tommy are in a relationship.

Behind the scenes, Jason David Frank was invited to appear in the special but declined, citing his retirement from the franchise in August 2022. Archive audio of Frank is used in scenes where the Green Ranger appears. Frank died in November 2022, after the conclusion of principal photography but before the special was released on Netflix. The special is dedicated to his and Thuy Trang's memories.

== Other versions ==
=== Comics ===
Frank as Lord Drakkon, in a promotional image of Boom! Studios' Power Rangers comic book event "Shattered Grid".

The character also appears in the Power Rangers comics from Boom Studios.

==== Lord Drakkon ====
A villainous alternate version of Tommy from another universe known as Lord Drakkon is also featured, with his costume combining elements of Tommy's green and white Ranger suits. Drakkon also controls a unique Zord called the Black Dragon. Because of the chain of events including Lord Drakkon's attacks to the Power Rangers' universe, it creates an alternate reality from the television series' continuity. He also kills Tommy before he can become the White Ranger. In 2018, Jason David Frank was involved with Boom! Studios' Power Rangers comic book storyline "Shattered Grid", about the character's war against all of the incarnations of the Power Rangers and their enemies throughout their universe's timeline with Frank portraying Lord Drakkon in its promotions. During the storyline, despite Drakkon having killed Tommy as part of his first attack on the prime universe, Tommy nevertheless plays an important role in Lord Drakkon's defeat, with a chain of events having trapped Tommy's spirit in a crystal held in the weapon Drakkon used to kill his counterpart. When Drakkon succeeds in subverting the Morphing Grid and using it to rewrite the universe to make himself the hero, Tommy's spirit forces Drakkon to face his fundamental weakness, Drakkon having attacked the multiverse simply because he couldn't accept that he was the only Tommy Oliver to choose evil. Although Tommy offers his counterpart a truce, Drakkon chooses to die instead. After the multiverse is restored, the timeline returned to how it is supposed to be as depicted in the television franchise. However, Drakkon returns to threaten the prime universe, with the Omega Rangers- Jason, Trini and Zack using new powers- recruiting Drakkon for his expertise out of desperation to deal with the greater threat.

==== Soul of the Dragon ====
Tommy features in the graphic novel Soul of the Dragon, which depicts him as an old man investigating the recent disappearance of his son, J.J., who has apparently dropped out of SPD. While investigating his son's recent activities with the aid of another SPD cadet, Tommy learns that his Master Morpher was damaged the last time he used it eight years ago; as a result, he can only morph into his past Ranger identities in reverse order (Black Dino to original Green), and once he has used a morph the power coin that creates the morph will be destroyed. With the aid of a reformed Finster, Tommy learns that J.J. was actually undercover investigating the return of Scorpina and the dark wizard Lokar, culminating in Tommy giving his Master Morpher to his son so that J.J. can use the final morph for himself. When Scorpina was defeated, Lokar got tired of waiting as Tommy witnesses Lokar sucking Scorpina and some of his followers back into the Talos Dimension. As Tommy leaves for a vacation with Kat, it is revealed that J.J. has become the official SPD Green Ranger, but the dregs of power in the Master Morpher have also left him with his father's Dragon Shield.

=== Films ===
==== 1995 film ====
In Mighty Morphin Power Rangers: The Movie, Jason David Frank portrayed a similar version of his character from the television series, who endowed new power from warrior Dulcea and becomes the White Ninja Ranger; he harnesses the spirit of the falcon and controlling the White Falcon Ninjazord to defeat Ivan Ooze with his team. Unlike the television series, Tommy's White Ranger costume is more of an armor than a formfitting spandex.

==== Power/Rangers (2015 short film) ====
In Power/Rangers Tommy Oliver (played by Russ Bain), in this much darker reimagining, in this timeline the Machine Empire defeats the Power Rangers and destroys the Megazord in battle, Earth's governments negotiate a truce with the Machine Empire and the Power Rangers are disbanded. Tommy is a wanted fugitive, whilst trying to find out who is murdering his former teammates. He fights Rocky DeSantos, who defected to the Machine Empire. After DeSantos is killed by Kimberly Hart, Tommy knows it isn't Kimberly because she was killed during the final battle, revealing herself to be Rita in disguise and also the one who has been killing his teammates. She asks Tommy to rejoin her so they can rule the world together; Tommy refuses and attacks her.

==== Power Rangers (2017 film) ====
While Tommy Oliver did not appear in the 2017 reboot film, Jason David Frank does have a cameo role, and Tommy Oliver is referenced in a post-credits scene, setting up his role as the Green Ranger in future sequels. Frank's cameo consists of a brief appearance of him as a random citizen of Angel Grove, accompanied by Amy Jo Johnson, where he is part of a crowd gathering after the Rangers have defeated Goldar in the Megazord, and is apparently the first person to bring out his cellphone to take a picture of the Megazord. The mid-credits sequence features a teacher in charge of the weekend detention class calling for Tommy Oliver, and the camera focusing on an empty chair with a green jacket with a dragon, draped over it. The cast of the film as well as Frank himself, have expressed interest in a female version in the sequel.

==== Power Rangers: Legacy Wars - Street Fighter Showdown (2018 shortfilm) ====
In this short film, Tommy Oliver is again played by Jason David Frank. He and former Megaforce ranger Gia Moran assist Ryu and Chun-Li in stopping the criminal M. Bison and freeing a captured Ninjor. During this film, it is revealed that Ninjor, who created the original power coins, gave Tommy an upgrade to his suit. He now has a silver and gold helmet, as well as new weapons and a darker colored suit.

== Reception ==
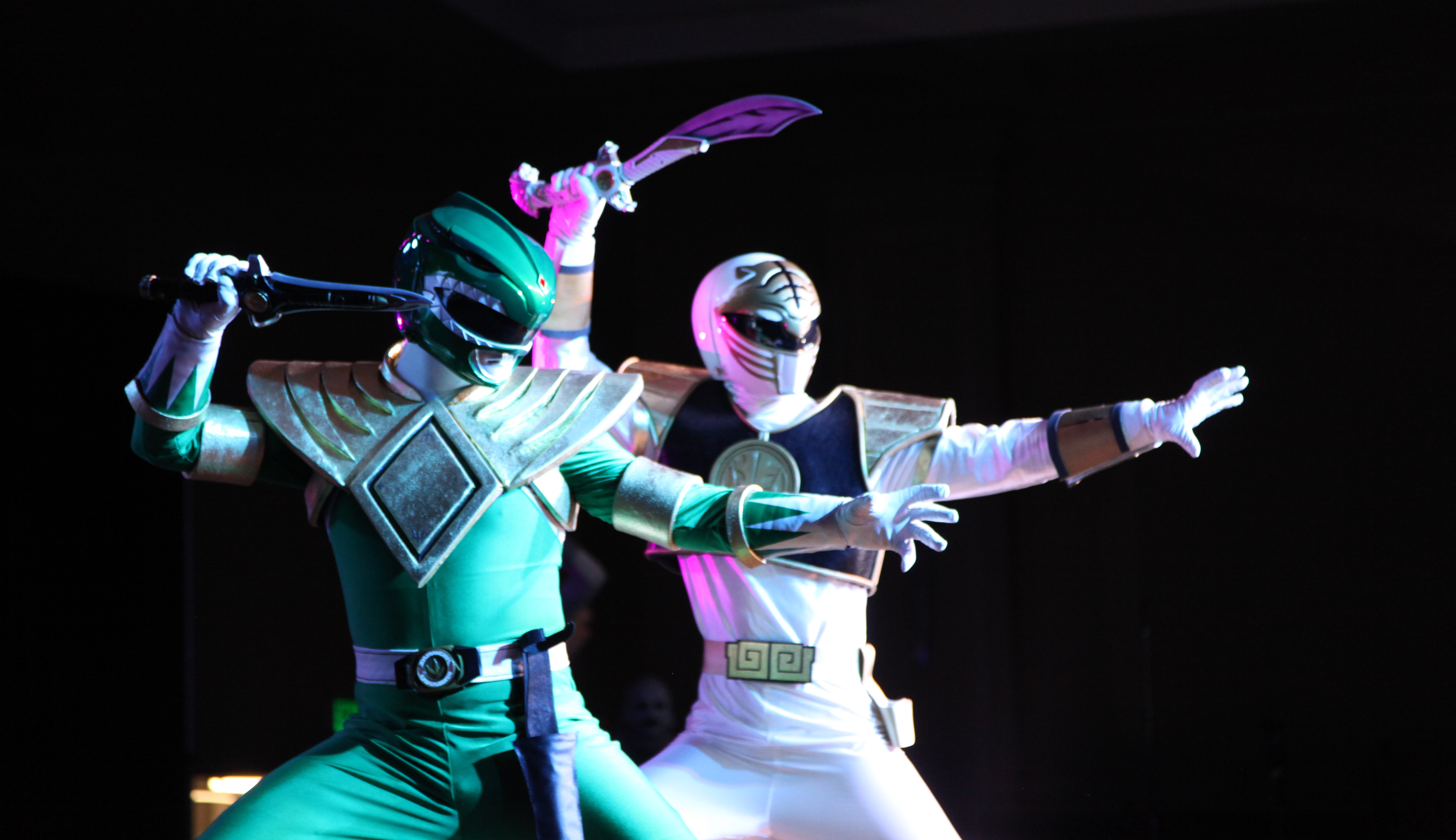
Cosplay of Tommy Oliver at MTAC 2012

Tommy has been often voted as the most popular character of the entire franchise. The character was only intended to appear for one season but became so popular that Tommy became a breakout character and a season regular. In-universe, Tommy has gained a reputation as Earth's greatest Power Ranger.
