= Mighty Morphin Power Rangers: Once & Always =

2023 American superhero television film

- Created by: Haim Saban; Toei Company, Ltd.
- Based on: Mighty Morphin Power Rangers by Saban Entertainment and Toei Company & Kyōryū Sentai Zyuranger by Toei Company
- Written by: Alwyn Dale; Becca Barnes
- Directed by: Charlie Haskell
- Starring: Catherine Sutherland; David Yost; Walter Emanuel Jones; Steve Cardenas; Charlie Kersh; Johnny Yong Bosch; Karan Ashley
- Voices of: Barbara Goodson; Richard Steven Horvitz; Ryan Cooper; Daniel Watterson
- Music by: Ron Wasserman
- Country of origin: United States
- Original language: English

Production
- Executive producers: Oliver Dumont; Kari Rosenberg; Randi Yaffa; Haim Saban
- Producers: Simon Bennett; Hillary Zwick Turner
- Production locations: Auckland, New Zealand
- Cinematography: Ollie Jones
- Editor: Brad Davison
- Running time: 55 minutes
- Production companies: Hasbro; Entertainment One; Power Rangers Productions Ltd.; Toei Company

Original release
- Network: Netflix
- Release: April 19, 2023

Related
- Turbo: A Power Rangers Movie (1997)

Mighty Morphin Power Rangers: Once & Always is a 2023 American superhero television film serving to commemorate the 30th anniversary of both Mighty Morphin Power Rangers (1993–1995) and the Power Rangers franchise. It is the fourth installment in the Power Rangers film series. The film is a standalone sequel to Turbo: A Power Rangers Movie (1997) and Power Rangers Cosmic Fury (2023).

The film was released on Netflix on April 19, 2023, and was later added on Hasbro Legends upon its launch in July 2026.

== Plot ==
In 2022, Billy Cranston calls in his teammates when a robotic version of Rita Repulsa and her Putties appear. However, Robo-Rita vaporizes Trini Kwan, who sacrifices herself to shield Billy, and flees to plan her revenge. Billy and Zack Taylor are forced to tell Trini's now-orphaned daughter Minh about her mother's fate.

One year later, Zack has become Minh's sole guardian. They go to meet the other Rangers at Trini's grave to mark the anniversary of her death, but they come upon an ambush by Robo-Rita, Robo-Snizzard, and Robo-Minotaur. Robo-Snizzard captures Jason Lee Scott, Tommy Oliver, and Kimberly Hart, imprisoning them in a machine. Minh reacts badly when Zack and Billy don't want her involved in the recovery mission and blames Billy for Trini's death.

A flashback revealed that Billy secretly built a new Command Center under his company, Cranston Tech. He worked with Alpha 8 to attempt to revive his former mentor Zordon by collecting particles from the Z-Wave. (Note: The Z-Wave was the result of Zordon's sacrifice as seen in the Power Rangers in Space episode "Countdown to Destruction" Pt. 2.) However, they end up with the evil purged from Rita Repulsa's original body which possesses Alpha 8 and reshaped it into a new body called Robo-Rita.

When the Putties begin an invasion all over Earth, Alpha 9 initiates the Bandora Protocol (Note: Named for Witch Bandora, Rita Repulsa's counterpart in Kyoryu Sentai Zyuranger), alerting all Ranger teams throughout the universe of the invasion. Former Rangers Kat Hillard and Rocky DeSantos teleport to the Command Center, being given proxy Power Coins so they can morph again. As they battle, Alpha overhears Minotaur tout his ability to track morphed Rangers and alerts Rangers worldwide to power down. Meanwhile, Minh unsuccessfully attempts to use Trini's Power Morpher to battle Putties at the juice bar, but is overwhelmed until Zack and Rocky teleport in. Upon their return to the Command Center, Zack has a heart-to-heart talk with Minh about what it means to be a Power Ranger.

At a junkyard, Billy, Rocky, and Kat morph to lure out Robo-Snizzard and Robo-Minotaur, then trap them on a giant electromagnet. Using Stealth Tech Projectors, the Rangers infiltrate Rita's Moon Palace and discover that several more Rangers have been captured and frozen in Robo-Rita's machine. Minh takes one of the Stealth Tech Projectors to sneak past Alpha and commandeers Billy's RADBUG. However, she is captured at the junkyard by Robo-Rita.

Billy deduces that Robo-Rita is constructing a time portal using the power of the captured Rangers to contact her past self, hoping to kill the Power Rangers before Zordon could recruit them. Robo-Rita arrives with Robo-Snizzard, Robo-Minotaur, and a captured Minh in tow. Robo-Rita attempts to kill Billy, but Minh jumps in front of the blast. The other Rangers fear her dead, but this good deed bonds the morpher to Minh, allowing her to morph and fight with the other Rangers. Kat, Rocky, and Zack battle and destroy Robo-Minotaur, while Billy and Minh form the Megazord to battle an enlarged Robo-Snizzard. After Robo-Snizzard is destroyed, the Rangers return to the Moon Palace, where Minh and Zack finally destroy Robo-Rita once and for all.

Back on Earth, former Rangers Adam Park and Aisha Campbell prepare to take the newly freed Rangers (including Jason, Kimberly, and Tommy) to the planet Aquitar to be fully healed. Billy, Zack, and Minh celebrate their victory at the Juice Bar. After Billy notes that it still might be possible to bring back Zordon one day, he and Zack tell Minh about their past adventures.

== Cast and characters ==
=== Rangers ===
- Walter Emanuel Jones as Zack Taylor, the original Black Ranger. Zack had become a congressman in his adult life but gave it up to adopt Minh.
- David Yost as Billy Cranston, the Blue Ranger. Billy returned from Aquitar sometime after 1998 and founded Cranston Tech where he hid a new Command Center that he built for the Power Rangers.
- Charlize "Charlie" Kersh as Minh Kwan, the third Yellow Ranger and the daughter of Trini Kwan, the first Yellow Ranger.
- Steve Cardenas as Rocky DeSantos, the second Red Ranger, and later Zeo Ranger III Blue. Rocky is now a firefighter.
- Catherine Sutherland as Katherine "Kat" Hillard, the second Pink Ranger, and later Zeo Ranger I Pink, and the original Pink Turbo Ranger. Kat is married to Tommy and has a son named J.J. who would later become the S.P.D. Green Ranger in the Boom! Studios comics.
- Johnny Yong Bosch as Adam Park, the second Black Ranger, later Zeo Ranger IV Green, the original Green Turbo Ranger, and a member of S.P.A.
- Karan Ashley as Aisha Campbell, the second Yellow Ranger and a member of S.P.A.

Thuy Trang, Amy Jo Johnson, Jason David Frank, and Austin St. John appear in archive audio and footage. Their characters (Trini Kwan, Kimberly Hart, Tommy Oliver, and Jason Lee Scott) otherwise appear only in morphed form portrayed by uncredited performers.

=== Supporting characters ===
- Richard Steven Horvitz as the voices of:
  - Alpha 8, a multi-functional sentient automaton from Edenoi.
  - Alpha 9, the successor of Alpha 8.

=== Villains ===
- Barbara Goodson as the voice of Robo-Rita Repulsa, the main antagonist for the movie who is the result of the evil purged from Rita Repulsa's original body possessing Alpha 8's body.
- Ryan Cooper as the voice of Robo-Minotaur, a robot version of Mighty Minotaur.
- Daniel Watterson as the voice of Robo-Snizzard, a robot version of Snizzard.

=== Other characters ===
- Benny Joy Smith as Annie, an employee at BuzzBlast. Smith reprises her role from Power Rangers Dino Fury.
- Howard Cyster as a boyfriend

== Production ==
=== Development ===
A reunion was first conceived in 2021 by David Yost, who had scripts for a multi-part project called Power Rangers: Quantum Continuum. He pitched the idea to multiple networks, but later revealed that the project itself was still in its early stages. Yost was not credited as a writer of the special. However, Jackie Marchand, a former writer and story editor for the show, was credited as a story consultant.

In 2022, Netflix became the home for first-run Power Rangers episodes after an existing deal with Nickelodeon, inherited from Saban Brands, was allowed to expire. The special, like the second half of Power Rangers Dino Fury, therefore was set to premiere on Netflix.

The title is a reference to "Once a Ranger, Always a Ranger,” the long-standing phrase used in Power Rangers; first spoken by Jason David Frank’s character, Tommy Oliver in the 2-part season premiere episode of Power Rangers Zeo. The phrase also served as the basis for the Power Rangers Operation Overdrive two-part special episode "Once a Ranger," which marked the show's 15th anniversary.

=== Casting ===
On February 25, 2022, casting sides for a character with the placeholder name "Yen" were released, though it was originally thought to be related to Power Rangers Cosmic Fury. On September 30, 2022 during Hasbro PulseCon 2022, it was announced that both Yost and Walter Jones were in the process of filming a "special anniversary" project in New Zealand. Furthermore, it was announced that Charlie Kersh would be joining the cast of the special as well. One month later, Hasbro announced the reprisals of Steve Cardenas, Catherine Sutherland, Karan Ashley, and Johnny Yong Bosch in their original roles.

Whereas the show had been a non-union production since moving to New Zealand, Once & Always was filmed under the SAG-AFTRA agreement for independent high-budget subscription video-on-demand programming.

Jason David Frank and Amy Jo Johnson were originally approached but turned down offers to appear in the special. Johnson cited a host of personal reasons while Frank said he had "done enough" for the franchise and wanted to focus on his film, Legend of the White Dragon. Frank died in November 2022, after the special had been filmed.

Austin St. John was unable to leave the country due to his May 2022 indictment in an alleged scheme to defraud the Paycheck Protection Program.

=== Filming ===
The cast had "weeks" of rehearsals in Auckland, Jones said. Filming occurred over the course of 12 days.

The sets for Angel Grove Youth Center, Rita's palace and the Dino Megazord cockpit were recreated based on extensive research, production designer Tracey Collins said.

=== Post-production ===
The audio for Once & Always was the first Power Rangers media to be mixed in Dolby Atmos. Ron Wasserman, who composed the theme song and score for the original series, and the theme for Power Rangers S.P.D., returned to score the special. Post-production ended in February.

A trailer was released on March 21, 2023.

After Frank's death, the special's ending was followed with a clip from the denouement of the season 2 episode The Song of Guitardo, in which Kimberly and Zack play a song for Tommy to help ease his anxiety over losing his Green Ranger powers. The song led into the episode's dedication to the memories of Trang and Frank. Jones called the song's reuse "very poignant."

== Reception ==
=== Critical response ===
On the review aggregator website Rotten Tomatoes, 78% of 15 critics' reviews are positive, with an average rating of 6.3/10. Metacritic, which uses a weighted average, assigned the film a score of 62 out of 100, based on 6 critics, indicating "generally favorable" reviews.

IGN reviewer Joshua Yehl praised the performances of Yost, Jones, and Kersh and said the special effectively balanced the weighty subject of Trini's death with the playfulness the franchise is known for. However, he criticized the "clunky" plot and dialogue and found the quality of the effects and fight choreography to be lacking. Den of Geek's Shamus Kelley wrote that the special "catered to all possible audiences" while crafting a moving tribute to Trang and Frank.

In its first week of availability, the special was Netflix's eighth most-watched movie worldwide and was on top 10 lists in 22 countries, including Brazil, Portugal and Argentina.

In April 2023, Yost expressed hope that the reception of the special would lead to future reunions. It was later revealed that Yost himself stayed behind in New Zealand after filming the special to join the cast of Power Rangers Cosmic Fury.

On December 10, 2024, Digital Eclipse released a beat 'em up video game Mighty Morphin Power Rangers: Rita's Rewind, which explores a "what-if" scenario to Once & Always.
