= Steve Cardenas =

American martial artist (born 1974)

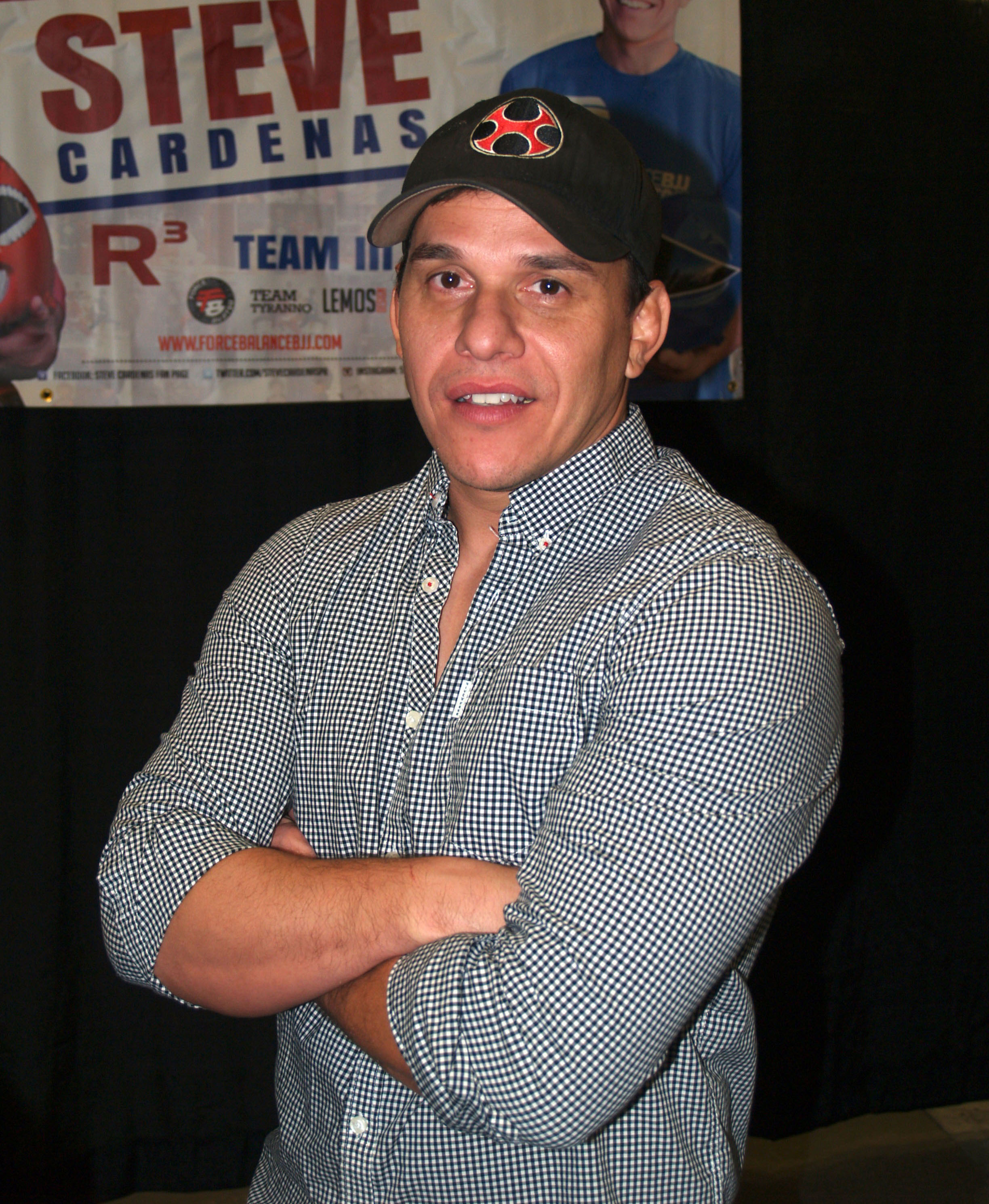
- Cardenas in April 2016
- Born: Stephen Antonio Cardenas; May 29, 1974 (age 51); Hampton, Virginia, U.S.
- Occupations: Martial artist; actor
- Years active: 1994–present (actor); 1986–present (martial artist)
- Known for: Rocky DeSantos in Power Rangers

Stephen Antonio Cardenas (born May 29, 1974) is an American martial artist and actor. He is best known for playing the character Rocky DeSantos, the second Red Ranger in Mighty Morphin Power Rangers and eventually the Blue Zeo Ranger in Power Rangers Zeo.

== Early life ==
Cardenas was born Stephen Antonio Cardenas on May 29, 1974, in Hampton, Virginia, at the Langley Air Force Base. Spending his early childhood as a military brat, Cardenas was raised in San Antonio, Texas. He is of Spanish and Mexican ancestry. He started training in martial arts when he was about 12 years old and reached black belt in Taekwondo at age 16. He has been training in the martial arts for over 30 years and has earned a 5th degree black belt in Taekwondo and a 3rd degree black belt in Brazilian jiu-jitsu.

== Career ==
At age 20, Cardenas left his native Texas and settled in Los Angeles to audition for a Mighty Morphin Power Rangers role that would change his life. His character, Rocky DeSantos, replaced Jason Lee Scott as the Red Ranger in the Mighty Morphin Power Rangers TV series, and later became the Blue Zeo Ranger for Power Rangers Zeo. He had no previous acting experience and had to learn on the job. Cardenas left the Power Rangers series and retired from acting during Power Rangers Turbo, due to contract disagreements, and possibly to focus on his martial arts career. Many years later, starting at the 2007 Power Morphicon convention, he began making convention appearances with other former cast members.

After Power Rangers, he owned a martial arts studio in Burbank, California and one in his hometown of San Antonio. In 2009, he started a kids-specific program at Hollywood Brazilian jiu-jitsu studio in West Hollywood, and in 2011 he opened the Force/Balance Brazilian jiu-jitsu & Yoga school. The studios have since been closed. Cardenas had become interested in Brazilian jiu-jitsu after losing a friendly match against "a blue belt in BJJ... [he] choked me out in 10 seconds! He was only training for a year and a half at that time and I had been training for 10 yrs. It was an immediate eye opener." The style was more difficult for him to learn than other martial arts disciplines.

He holds multiple awards from martial arts contests, including two silver medals at Copa Pacifica (2009 and 2011), Gold Medal winner of the 2009 American National Championship, Gold Medal in the 2010 Jujitsu Pro Gear Open, and silver medal in the 2010 No-Gi World Championships.

In 2017, he starred in the short movie The Order alongside Austin St. John, Catherine Sutherland, David Yost, Johnny Yong Bosch, Paul Schrier, Karan Ashley, Walter Emanuel Jones, Erin Cahill, Blake Foster, Nakia Burrise, Hilary Shepard Turner, Dan Southworth, Alyson Sullivan, Deborah Estelle Phillips and Azim Rizk.

For the first time since Power Rangers Turbo, Cardenas returned to the Power Rangers franchise in Power Rangers Super Ninja Steel for the 25th anniversary episode reprising his role as Rocky DeSantos. He also reprised the role in the Netflix special, Mighty Morphin Power Rangers: Once & Always, which celebrated the 30th anniversary of the Power Rangers franchise.

== Filmography ==
=== Film ===
Year	Title	Role	Notes
1995	Mighty Morphin Power Rangers: The Movie	Rocky DeSantos / The Red Ranger	
1997	Turbo: A Power Rangers Movie	Rocky DeSantos	
2017	The Order	Dax	Short film
2017	Beast of the Water	Evans	
2023	Mighty Morphin Power Rangers: Once & Always	Rocky DeSantos / Mighty Morphin Red Ranger	Television special

=== Television ===
Year	Title	Role	Notes
1994–1995	Mighty Morphin Power Rangers	Rocky DeSantos / Mighty Morphin Red Ranger	Main role (season 2–3)
1996	Mighty Morphin Alien Rangers	Rocky DeSantos / Mighty Morphin Red Ranger	Main role
1996	Power Rangers Zeo	Rocky DeSantos / Blue Zeo Ranger	Main role
1997	Power Rangers Turbo	Rocky DeSantos	2 episodes
2018	Power Rangers Super Ninja Steel	Rocky DeSantos / Mighty Morphin Red Ranger	Episode: “Dimensions in Danger”
