= Jason Narvy =

American actor (born 1974)

- Born: Jason Andrew Narvy; March 27, 1974 (age 52); Los Angeles, California, U.S.
- Occupation: Actor
- Years active: 1993–present
- Known for: Skull in Power Rangers
- Spouse: Amy Schnetzer

Jason Andrew Narvy (born March 27, 1974) is an American actor known for playing the role of Eugene "Skull" Skullovitch on the various iterations of Power Rangers and film franchise from 1993 to 2012, beginning with Mighty Morphin Power Rangers in 1993.

== Career ==
Narvy grew up in Los Angeles. He studied at the Lee Strasberg Theater Institute. He is best known for playing Skull, one half of the bullying rival duo on Fox Television's children's TV series Mighty Morphin Power Rangers, a role he reprised on its spin-offs, Power Rangers Zeo, Power Rangers Turbo, and Power Rangers in Space, before leaving the franchise to continue college. He made a cameo appearance in the last episode of Power Rangers Super Samurai. He also appeared in the feature film adaptations, Mighty Morphin Power Rangers: The Movie in 1995 and the Turbo: A Power Rangers Movie in 1997.

He also provided the voice of Combat Chopper on the sci-fi children's show Masked Rider.

Narvy appeared in a lead role in a Fox Family pilot, Men in White. He also appeared numerous commercials, public service announcements and voiced numerous toys, tie-ins, and video games for Fox, ABC, and Disney.

He received a Bachelor of Arts degree from Franklin and Marshall College, and got his master's degree from Mary Baldwin College, where he studied with the American Shakespeare Center, performing in the title role in Henry V, Pericles, and Hamlet. He also appeared as Richard of Gloucester and Suffolk in a conflation of the Henry VI trilogy. Jason also worked with the Legitimate Theater Company of New York, a Lower East Side company that emphasizes new plays and experimental works.

Narvy is a certified actor/combatant with the British Academy of Stage and Screen Combat, a member of the Screen Actors Guild, and holds a PhD in Theater Studies from the University of California, Santa Barbara. He is currently an assistant professor of acting, directing, and musical theatre at East Stroudsburg University in Pennsylvania.

Narvy became a brand ambassador for Shout!Factory TV's TokuSHOUTsu channel on Pluto TV.

Narvy remains good friends with his co-star Paul Schrier, and was close to Jason David Frank before his death.

== Filmography ==
=== Television ===
- Mighty Morphin Power Rangers – Skull
- Power Rangers Zeo – Skull
- Power Rangers Turbo – Skull
- Power Rangers in Space – Skull
- Power Rangers Lost Galaxy – Skull (cameo appearance, uncredited episode: Quasar Quest part 1)
- Power Rangers Wild Force – Skull (guest appearance, episode: Forever Red)
- Power Rangers Super Samurai – Skull (guest appearance)

=== Voice-over ===
- Masked Rider – Combat Chopper (voice)
- Power Rangers Turbo – Skull's chimp form (voice, first half of season)

=== Film roles ===
- Mighty Morphin Power Rangers: The Movie – Skull (1995)
- Turbo: A Power Rangers Movie – Skull (1997)
- Wicked Game – Guile Lydon (2002)
- Penny – Mike (2010)
- The Baku – Baku (2024)
