= Power Rangers Ninja Steel =

American television series

- Also known as: Power Rangers Super Ninja Steel
- Genre: Action; Adventure; Science fiction; Superhero
- Created by: Haim Saban; Toei Company
- Based on: Shuriken Sentai Ninninger by Toei Company
- Developed by: Saban Brands; Toei Company
- Showrunner: Judd "Chip" Lynn
- Written by: Judd "Chip" Lynn; Becca Barnes; Alwyn Dale; Uther Dean; Steve McCleary
- Starring: See "Cast"
- Narrated by: Daryl Habraken
- Opening theme: Pierre Desmont; Noam Kaniel
- Composers: Noam Kaniel; Youseff "Joe" Guezoum; Nicholas Varley
- Countries of origin: United States; Japan
- Original language: English
- No. of seasons: 2
- No. of episodes: 44

Production
- Executive producers: Haim Saban; Judd "Chip" Lynn; Brian Casentini
- Producer: Joel Andryc
- Production locations: New Zealand (Auckland Region) (Auckland); Japan (Greater Tokyo Area) (Tokyo, Saitama, Yokohama, Gunma, Utsunomiya) and Kyoto)
- Cinematography: Kevin Riley; DJ Stipsen; Sean McLin (2nd unit)
- Running time: 25 minutes
- Production companies: Saban Brands; Power Rangers Productions; Toei Company

Original release
- Network: Nickelodeon
- Release: January 21, 2017 – December 1, 2018

Related
- Power Rangers television series

First season poster.

Second season logo.

Power Rangers Ninja Steel is a television series and the twentieth entry of the Power Rangers franchise. The season was produced primarily using footage, costumes, and props from Japanese 39th Super Sentai series Shuriken Sentai Ninninger with minimal costume and prop elements being recycled from Ressha Sentai ToQger. The show was produced by Saban Brands and premiered on Nickelodeon on January 21, 2017.

The second season of Ninja Steel and twenty-fifth Power Rangers season overall, Power Rangers Super Ninja Steel, premiered on January 27, 2018, ending on December 1, 2018. As the twenty-fifth anniversary season of the franchise, Super Ninja Steel featured popular Rangers from past seasons. Ninja Steel was the last installment in the series to have toys manufactured and distributed by Bandai and Super Ninja Steel was the last season produced by Saban Brands, before the Power Rangers franchise was acquired by Hasbro in 2018.

The series features the last appearance of Jason David Frank as Tommy Oliver before his death in 2022.

== Plot summary ==
=== Season 1: Ninja Steel ===
Galvanax is the reigning champion of Galaxy Warriors, the most popular intergalactic TV game show in the universe where contestants from all over the universe battle to prove who is the galaxy's mightiest warrior. He has become determined to make himself invincible by controlling the mythical Ninja Nexus Prism, which contains the supernatural Ninja Nexus Star. Meanwhile, the Prism, flying through space, lands at the house of Master Dane Romero, who chips off old fragments of the Prism's metallic coating, creating the legendary Ninja Steel. When Galvanax came to Earth soon after, Dane fought him to keep him from obtaining the Nexus Star and apparently sacrificed himself to thwart Galvanax's plan, while in the process separating the Nexus Star into six separate Ninja Power Stars, though Galvanax and his minions Madame Odius and Ripcon made off with his son Brody. Ten years later, an enslaved Brody escapes from Galvanax's ship with the Prism, the Power Stars, and fellow slaves Redbot and Mick Kanic and returns to Earth, descending into the city of Summer Cove where they meet high school students Preston Tien, Sarah Thompson, Calvin Maxwell, and Hayley Foster who manage to retrieve the Power Stars from the Prism and morph into the Ninja Steel Power Rangers. Furious at the outcome, Galvanax sends his warrior contestants down to Earth to steal the Prism where each epic battle against the Rangers is broadcast throughout the universe. Together, the Rangers must master their arsenal of Power Stars, Mega Morph Cycles, and Zords, that are all made from the Ninja Steel, in order to stop this evil threat and save the Earth from destruction. During their battles, they gain a new addition to their team in the form of country singer Levi Weston, who received his own Power Star and became the Gold Ranger. He is later revealed to be Brody's long lost brother Aiden.

During the final battle against Galvanax, the Prism restores Brody's broken Red Ninja Power Star where it not only turns Mick into an alternate Red Ranger, but also restores Dane. The Rangers are able to destroy Galvanax with the Ninja Nexus Prism going inactive, but Madame Odius survives the unexpected Ninja Steel meteor attack on Galvanax's ship.

=== Season 2: Super Ninja Steel ===
In Power Rangers Super Ninja Steel, the heroic teens find themselves face-to-face with an old enemy when they discover that Madame Odius is still alive and is more determined than ever to steal the Ninja Nexus Prism and revive its powers for her nefarious purposes with the assistance of Badonna, Brax, and General Tynamon. Now it is up to the Rangers and some unexpected help from new friends to use the power of teamwork to protect the Prism, defeat Madame Odius, and save the world.

Sledge and his crew from Power Rangers Dino Charge escape from a wormhole and discover the wreckage of the Warrior Dome. After encountering the survivors of the asteroid collision, including Madame Odius and Cosmo Royale, Sledge offers to fix the ship in exchange for the asteroid, which is covered in Ninja Super Steel, a metal even stronger than Ninja Steel. Instead, Odius tricks him and gains the loyalty of a prisoner of his named Badonna, takes the Super Steel for herself, and gets the ship fixed regardless. Putting Galaxy Warriors back on the air, Odius, Badonna, and a new contestant named Smellephant attack Earth to revive the Ninja Nexus Prism and forge evil Ninja Stars from Super Steel. Thanks to prior warning from a returning Mick and using every trick up their sleeves, the former Rangers manage to claim the Super Steel and regain their powers, though much stronger than before.

With new and improved powers and gear, the Rangers protect the Ninja Power Stars from Odius and her Warrior contestants. In order to get an edge on them, Badonna books a ragtag team of Galactic Ninjas, intent on proving their superiority to the "Earth Ninjas". Odius hatches a plan to send the Galactic Ninjas into fatal battles in order to claim their Ninja Medallions for the creation of Foxatron, her own Zord. Foxatron destroys the Ninja Ultrazord, leaving the Rangers' Zord Stars burned and in no condition for use. Luckily, with the help of three mysterious cloaked figures, they are able to repair the Zord Stars and destroy Foxatron with their new Ninja Blaze Megazord, gained by proving to the Prism, that they're kind at heart enough to be worthy of such power.

As revenge, Odius forms an alliance with Lord Draven, ruler of an evil dimension known as the Antiverse. The two plan to unite all dimensions into one and use an army of Robo Ranger clones to conquer them all. Fortunately, the Ninja Steel Rangers and a team of Legendary Rangers (including the three cloaked figures revealed to be Wes Collins, Gemma from RPM, and Koda from Dino Charge, as well as Tommy Oliver, Katherine Hillard, Rocky DeSantos, Trent Fernandez-Mercer, T.J. Johnson, Antonio Garcia, and Gia Moran, all of whom escaped Draven's captivity) are able to destroy Draven and stop the merging of the dimensions.

After the fall of the Galactic Ninjas and Draven's demise, Odius continues to plot the Rangers' downfall, even as going as far as to trick the legendary Space Sheriff Skyfire into viewing the Rangers as thieves, while the sheriff was hunting a wanted criminal and demolitions expert named Blammo, who was a contestant on Galaxy Warriors at the time. Odius makes yet another deal, this time with General Tynamon, manager of a famous fighter named Brax. Tynamon is actually a small monster using a robot suit to look big, hoping Odius will grant him to grow big if he can get the Power Stars and destroy the Rangers. While he does succeed in testing out her mind control device and thus gaining Mick as an ally, the monster is only able to achieve his dream for a small amount of time, as he is destroyed by the Rangers. For Odius however, losing Tynamon is meaningless as Mick can help her launch her ultimate plan.

Mick promises to help her broadcast a signal which will mind control the whole planet. A monster named Gorrox disguises as a TV producer to get humans for her broadcast. The audition he holds causes Calvin and Hayley to argue and breakup, while, Victor and Monty are chosen for the role. Gorrox reveals himself and is destroyed along with a vengeful Brax, in battle with the Rangers. Unfortunately, they are unable to stop her as Odius now controls half the human race and has ambushed Summer Cove High. While Sarah and Hayley sneak onto the Warrior Dome to save a mind controlled Calvin, the Romero brothers and Preston watch as Odius turns the Nexus Prism evil and forges a Ninja Nexus Super Star, revealing she's wanted to control an army with the Prism's power for a thousand years. The three are then forced to fight Brody and Levi's father Dane, who was also mind controlled. Luckily, Hayley destroys the satellite and gets back together with a free Calvin. Odius' former human soldiers escape with Victor and Monty's help, leading to the destruction of the Warrior Dome and demise of Cosmo Royale and Badonna. Despite having her plan failed, Odius is still able to unite with the Nexus Super Star. The Rangers reunite and in order to combat a seemingly unstoppable Odius, infuse themselves with the power of the Nexus Star with a little help from Preston's magic. Try as she may, Odius is no match for a whole team of those with equal powers to hers, falling in the final battle when the Rangers combine their Nexus Stars with the Nexus Power and bringing peace to Earth. Victor and Monty are rewarded for their bravery in helping to stop Odius while the Rangers return their powers to the Ninja Nexus Prism, which uses its power to reforge its Ninja Steel crust and flies off in search of another planet in need. With Mick remaining on Earth as their teacher (though remaining in contact with his family through satellite), the Rangers return to life as normal high school students, unaware that Sledge and his crew are still alive elsewhere in space.

Later, Sledge and his crew return again on Christmas where they use the rebuilt Warrior Dome ship to start Poisandra's talk show. With help from Koda, the Blue Dino Charge Ranger and Santa Claus, Sledge and his crew along with his ship and reprogrammed Basher Bots are all destroyed. Afterwards, Koda invites the Ninja Steel Rangers back to his world to spend Christmas with him.

== Cast and characters ==
Rangers

- William Shewfelt as Brody Romero, the Ninja Steel Red Ranger. He is Dane Romero's youngest son and Aiden's younger brother
- Peter Sudarso as Preston Tien, the Ninja Steel Blue Ranger
- Nico Greetham as Calvin Maxwell, the Ninja Steel Yellow Ranger
- Zoe Robins as Hayley Foster, the Ninja Steel White Ranger
- Chrysti Ane as Sarah Thompson, the Ninja Steel Pink Ranger
- Jordi Webber as Aiden Romero/Levi Weston, the Ninja Steel Gold Ranger. He is Dane Romero's oldest son and Brody's older brother.

Supporting cast

- Chris Reid as Victor Vincent
- Caleb Bendit as Monty
- Kelson Henderson as Mick Kanic, Ninja Steel Red Ranger II
- Ruby Love as Princess Viera
- Byron Coll as the voice of Redbot
- Amanda Billing as Principal Hastings
- Claire Chitham as Mrs. Finch
- Mikaela Ruegg as Sandy
- Lori Dungey as Mrs. Bell
- Stanley Andrew Jackson III as Tom, Levi Weston's manager.
- Daniel Sing as the Mayor of Summer Cove
- Jodie Rimmer as Jackie Thompson
- Taylor Barrett as Ace
- Malcolm Bishop as Business manager to the Mayor of Summer Cove
- Mike Edward as Master Dane Romero, Ninja Steel Red Ranger III
- Taimana Marupo as Young Brody Romero
- Ethan Buckwell as Young Aiden Romero
- Kohji Mimura as Redbot (in-suit actor, Ninja Steel)
- Emma Carr as Redbot (in-suit actor, Super Ninja Steel)

Villains

- Richard Simpson as the voice of Galvanax
- Campbell Cooley as the voices of Ripcon and Cosmo Royale
- Jacque Drew as the voice of Madame Odius
- Marissa Stott as the voice of Badonna
- Jamie Linehan as the voice of Brax
- Rajneel Singh as the voice of Lord Draven
- Adam Gardiner as the voice of Sledge
- Estevez Gillespie as the voices of Wrench and General Tynamon
- Jackie Clarke as the voice of Poisandra

Guest stars

- Jason David Frank as Tommy Oliver, the original Green and White Ranger from Mighty Morphin Power Rangers, Zeo Ranger V Red from Power Rangers Zeo, the first Red Turbo Ranger from Power Rangers Turbo, and Black Dino Thunder Ranger from Power Rangers Dino Thunder.
- Steve Cardenas as Rocky DeSantos, the second Red Ranger from Mighty Morphin Power Rangers and Zeo Ranger III Blue Power Rangers Zeo.
- Catherine Sutherland as Katherine "Kat" Hillard, the second Pink Ranger from Mighty Morphin Power Rangers, Zeo Ranger I Pink Power Rangers Zeo & the first Pink Turbo Ranger from Power Rangers Turbo. (credited as Cat Chilson)
- Selwyn Ward as T.J. Johnson, the Blue Space Ranger from Power Rangers in Space and the second Red Turbo Ranger from Power Rangers Turbo.
- Jason Faunt as Wesley "Wes" Collins, the Red Time Force Ranger from Power Rangers Time Force.
- Jeffrey Parazzo as Trent Fernandez-Mercer, the White Dino Thunder Ranger from Power Rangers Dino Thunder.
- Li Ming Hu as Gemma, the Silver Ranger from Power Rangers RPM.
- Steven Skyler as Antonio Garcia, the Gold Samurai Ranger from Power Rangers Samurai.
- Ciara Hanna as Gia Moran, the Yellow Megaforce Ranger from Power Rangers Megaforce.
- Yoshi Sudarso as Koda, the Blue Dino Charge Ranger from Power Rangers Dino Charge.

== Episodes ==
=== Season 1: Power Rangers Ninja Steel (2017) ===
No. overall	No. in season	Title	Directed by	Written by	Original release date	U.S. viewers (millions)
1	1	"Return of the Prism"	Peter Burger	Chip Lynn	January 21, 2017	1.53
Redbot a robot, Mick a shape-shifting alien and a young teen named Brody escape to Earth from an alien spaceship with a special artifact called the Ninja Nexus Prism. He and two new friends, Preston & Sarah, must unlock its secrets to defend it from the villainous champion Galvanax.
2	2	"Forged in Steel"	Peter Burger	Chip Lynn	January 28, 2017	1.55
As Brody, Preston and Sarah return to Brody's childhood home in an attempt to find his lost family, Hayley and Calvin come across a strange alien named Mick.
3	3	"Live and Learn"	Michael Duignan	Chip Lynn, Becca Barnes, and Alwyn Dale	February 4, 2017	1.50
Brody is accused of cheating on his first day of school after using his Datacom to find answers. Now, he must use his own abilities and leadership skills without it to lead the Rangers against another threat from Galvanax.
4	4	"Presto Change-O"	Michael Duignan	Chip Lynn, Becca Barnes, and Alwyn Dale	February 11, 2017	1.52
Preston is amazed when he discovers he's developed real magical abilities. Meanwhile, Galvanax hatches a plan with a new monster to steal the Ninja Power Stars.
5	5	"Drive to Survive"	Michael Duignan	Chip Lynn, Becca Barnes, and Alwyn Dale	February 25, 2017	1.29
While battling a new spider-like monster called Tangleweb, Calvin must learn to conquer his greatest fear to save the rangers and unlock a new power. The Green Elephant/Rumble Tusk Zord makes its debut.
6	6	"My Friend, Redbot"	Simon Bennett	Chip Lynn, Becca Barnes, and Alwyn Dale	March 4, 2017	1.29
Hayley and Redbot are separated from the other rangers, and Hayley learns that Redbot is capable of human emotion despite his robotic nature. Meanwhile, Madame Odious uses the Gold Power Star to torture a mysterious "stowaway" to become the gold power ranger and further her own plans.
7	7	"Hack Attack"	Simon Bennett	Chip Lynn, Becca Barnes, and Alwyn Dale	March 18, 2017	1.26
Sarah tries to participate in several student activities and creates the ability to holographically clone herself, something which interests the wrong crowd. A new monster gains access to Sarah's tech and gives the cloning machine to Galvanax, who uses it to clone himself. Astro Zord rescues the mysterious stowaway, who turns out to be the Gold Power Ranger on Warrior Dome.
8	8	"Gold Rush"	Simon Bennett	Chip Lynn, Becca Barnes, and Alwyn Dale	March 18, 2017	1.16
The Ninja Steel Gold Ranger makes an appearance, as both Galvanax and the Rangers rush out to learn all they can say about who it is. Brody finds himself as the new bodyguard for a country music star named Levi Weston. Levi later reveals himself as the Gold Ranger when Ripcon kidnaps his contractor. The Lion Fire Zord appears in a vision.
9	9	"Rocking and Rolling"	Oliver Driver	Chip Lynn, Becca Barnes, and Alwyn Dale	August 12, 2017	0.95
Levi is excited to be embarking on his world tour, but as mysterious earthquakes start shaking Summer Cove, he's presented with a tough decision.
10	10	"The Ranger Ribbon"	Oliver Driver	Chip Lynn, Becca Barnes, and Alwyn Dale	August 19, 2017	1.09
When Summer Cove's sentimental "Ribbon Tree" is in danger of being cut down by Preston's wealthy dad Marcus Tien, Preston must learn to stand up to his father in order to save what's important. Meanwhile, Ripperat's brother Trapsaw tries to trap the Rangers but fails every time. Brody has another encounter with Ripcon. A man appears, claiming to be Brody's long-lost brother Aiden.
11	11	"Poisonous Plots"	Oliver Driver	Chip Lynn, Becca Barnes, and Alwyn Dale	August 26, 2017	1.24
Brody is eager to reunite with Aiden, though Mick, Levi, and Hayley are suspicious of Aiden's motives. Later, a monster named Toxitea poisons Brody. Madame Odius demands the Rangers hand over their power stars in exchange for the antidote. Though Aiden urges them to agree to Odius' terms, Levi and Hayley create fake power stars made of chocolate and fool Odius into giving them the cure. The Rangers defeat Toxitea, though Odius escapes. At the end of the episode, Odius and Aiden are revealed to be working together.
12	12	"Family Fusion"	Michael Duignan	Chip Lynn, Becca Barnes, and Alwyn Dale	September 2, 2017	1.18
On Odius's instructions, Aiden tricks Ripcon into helping him get the Ninja Steel. Ripcon attacks the city, distracting the Rangers except for Levi helping Mick create the new Ninja Fusion Star. With the Fusion Star, Brody beats Ripcon, forcing him to retreat. At the same time, Aiden breaks into the base and fights with Levi for the Ninja Steel. During the fight, Aiden is revealed to be a robot imposter. The other Rangers arrive just in time to save Levi and destroy the robot Aiden. Madame Odius frames Ripcon for both the failed robot plot and for hiding Levi on Galvanax's ship. Furious, Galvanax has Ripcon gigantified and forces him to fight the Rangers again. Although Ripcon initially overpowers the Rangers' Megazords, Brody uses the Ninja Fusion Star to combine their Megazords into the Ninja Fusion Zord. With their new Megazord, the Rangers finally destroy Ripcon. After the battle, Brody sings his father's song at a school talent show, triggering a flood of Levi's memories. It is revealed that Levi is Aiden and that his childhood memories had earlier been stolen by Odius and placed in her robot. Levi/Aiden now remembers that he went into hiding and assumed Levi Weston's identity to protect himself from Galvanax. Reunited at last, Brody and Levi embrace. At the end of the episode, all the rangers sing the Family song.
13	13	"Ace and the Race"	Michael Duignan	Chip Lynn, Becca Barnes, and Alwyn Dale	September 9, 2017	0.94
Calvin finds himself increasingly distracted from his friends and Power Ranger duties when he spends all this time trying to impress his local hero.
14	14	"The Royal Rival"	Simon Bennett	Chip Lynn, Becca Barnes, and Alwyn Dale	September 16, 2017	1.20
A mysterious princess and her royal guard arrive on Earth to challenge the Ninja Steel Rangers.
15	15	"The Royal Rumble"	Simon Bennett	Chip Lynn, Becca Barnes, and Alwyn Dale	September 23, 2017	1.04
The Ninja Steel Rangers band together with a new ally to try and defeat Galvanax's new champion – but even their teamwork may not be enough.
16	16	"Grave Robber"	Oliver Driver	Becca Barnes, Alwyn Dale, and Chip Lynn	October 7, 2017	1.11
A Halloween board game leads the Ninja Steel Rangers into Cosmo Royale's trap where they must confront monsters they have already beaten.
17	17	"Monkey Business"	Michael Duignan	Chip Lynn, Becca Barnes, and Alwyn Dale	October 14, 2017	1.11
Calvin and Hayley decide to run for office at school but are thrown into discord by a monster capable of recording their voices.
18	18	"The Adventures Of Redbot"	Simon Bennett	Chip Lynn, Becca Barnes, and Alwyn Dale	October 21, 2017	0.95
Redbot documents the adventures of the Power Rangers on his new blog, while a cat-like monster attempts to steal the Ninja Power Stars.
19	19	"Abrakadanger"	Mike Smith	Becca Barnes, Alwyn Dale, and Chip Lynn	October 28, 2017	1.07
Preston must confront one of Galvanax's newest contestants after his magical spells backfire on his teammates.
20	20	"Helping Hand"	Mike Smith	Alywn Dale, Chip Lynn, and Becca Barnes	November 4, 2017	1.05
While Sarah deals with issues at school, the Ninja Steel Rangers must overcome an invincible force field.
21	21	"Galvanax Rises"	Mike Smith	Chip Lynn, Becca Barnes, and Alwyn Dale	November 18, 2017	1.06
The final battle begins as Galvanax unleashes his devastating attack. But, Madame Odius betrays Galvanax. Aiden and Brody are reunited with their father.
22	22	"Past, Presents and Future"	Charlie Haskell	Alwyn Dale, Chip Lynn, and Becca Barnes	December 2, 2017	1.02
When Cleocatra freezes the Power Rangers in revenge for defeating Cat O'Clock, Sarah and Santa Claus must travel through time to save the day.

=== Season 2: Power Rangers Super Ninja Steel (2018) ===
No. overall	No. in season	Title	Directed by	Written by	Original release date	U.S. viewers (millions)
23	1	"Echoes of Evil"	Charlie Haskell	Chip Lynn, Becca Barnes, and Alwyn Dale	January 27, 2018	1.01
Madame Odius returns to Earth to track down the Ninja Nexus Prism after Sledge and his crew made their unexpected return from Dino Charge. As she arrives with the intent of fixing the Prism and turning it evil but is frustrated by the Rangers.
24	2	"Moment of Truth"	Charlie Haskell	Becca Barnes, Alwyn Dale, and Chip Lynn	February 3, 2018	1.14
Calvin forgets his Anniversary to Hayley and covers up his mistake, but begins to regret his decision not to tell the truth. The web of lies also boosts the strength of this week's contestant, Deceptron, whose bolts prevents the rangers from using their powers.
25	3	"Tough Love"	Charlie Haskell	Alwyn Dale, Chip Lynn, and Becca Barnes	February 10, 2018	0.98
Levi meets a street performer and tries to change himself to impress her, unaware that she's a monster trying to turn him evil.
26	4	"Making Waves"	Oliver Driver	Chip Lynn, Becca Barnes, and Alwyn Dale	February 17, 2018	0.97
Doomwave, an aquatic monster, creates a tidal wave generator, intent on destroying Summer Cove. Hayley and Sarah are worried about their parents dating, but their project just might help.
27	5	"Game Plan"	Oliver Driver	Becca Barnes, Alwyn Dale, and Chip Lynn	February 24, 2018	1.00
The students of Summer Cove come under the influence of a new video game, unaware that the monster inside is using their high scores to super charge himself and trap the Rangers. Now Mick and Levi have to figure out how to get the other rangers out.
28	6	"Attack Of The Galactic Ninjas"	Oliver Driver	Alwyn Dale, Chip Lynn, and Becca Barnes	March 3, 2018	1.15
The Rangers are attacked by the new, mysterious group called the Galactic Ninjas, beginning with their leader Wolvermean when he steals Preston, Hayley, Brody and Sarah's memories of being Ninja Rangers.
29	7	"The Need For Speed"	Murray Keane	Chip Lynn, Becca Barnes, and Alwyn Dale	March 10, 2018	1.23
Sarah tries to break the record for the fastest hover board by using strange, alien technology left behind by Galactic Ninja Speedwing.
30	8	"Caught Red Handed"	Murray Keane	Becca Barnes, Alwyn Dale, and Chip Lynn	March 17, 2018	1.08
Brody is accused of stealing a compass from Principal Hastings. In the end, the Rangers are attacked by Madame Odius' evil Zord, the Foxatron, after Galactic Ninja Rygore is destroyed, and Venoma is forced to give Odius the ninja medallions.
31	9	"Outfoxed"	Murray Keane	Uther Dean, Steve McCleary, and Chip Lynn	August 25, 2018	1.24
After their Zords are disabled by Odius’ giant Foxatron; the Rangers must find a way to call forth the new Ninja Blaze Megazord. Guest Stars: Jason Faunt, Li Ming Hu and Yoshi Sudarso.
32	10	"Dimensions in Danger"	Simon Bennett and Akihiro 'Yuji' Noguchi	Chip Lynn, Becca Barnes, and Alwyn Dale	August 28, 2018	0.86
In a very special 25th Anniversary episode, the Super Ninja Steel Rangers team up with Legendary Rangers from the past two-and-a-half decades in an epic battle to save their own worlds when a new monster known as Lord Draven tries to steal ranger powers to create his army of evil clones. Leading the charge is none other than Time Force Red Ranger Wesley Collins, RPM Silver Ranger Gemma, Blue Dino Charge Ranger Koda, and Tommy Oliver himself. The past rangers that Lord Draven is keeping capture to make copies of evil clones of are Rocky DeSantos (second Red Mighty Morphin Ranger), Katherine Hillard (first Pink Turbo Ranger), T.J. Johnson (Blue Space Ranger), Trent Fernandez (White Dino Thunder Ranger), Antonio Garcia (Gold Samurai Ranger), and Gia Moran (Yellow Megaforce Ranger). Guest Stars: Jason David Frank, Steve Cardenas, Catherine Sutherland, Selwyn Ward, Jason Faunt, Jeffrey Parazzo, Li Ming Hu, Steven Skyler, Ciara Hanna and Yoshi Sudarso.
33	11	"Love Stings"	Simon Bennett	Becca Barnes, Alwyn Dale, and Chip Lynn	September 1, 2018	0.87
Preston learns not to believe everything he hears when Victor tells him Sandy doesn't want to go to the Valentine's Day Dance with anyone. Simultaneously, the last of the Galactic Ninjas, Venoma, infects the other male members of the rangers with a love-inducing venom.
34	12	"Fan Frenzy"	Simon Bennett	Alwyn Dale, Chip Lynn, and Becca Barnes	September 8, 2018	0.90
Dreadwolf attempts to transform the Power Rangers, and one of Levi's fans, into werewolves, and Levi becomes overwhelmed by an overzealous fan.
35	13	"Prepare To Fail"	Simon Bennett	Chip Lynn, Becca Barnes, and Alwyn Dale	September 15, 2018	1.17
Sarah and the team's overconfidence puts them all at risk. The Rangers meet and fight a new enemy, Brax.
36	14	"Sheriff Skyfire"	Oliver Driver	Becca Barnes, Alwyn Dale, and Chip Lynn	September 22, 2018	0.98
Madame Odius asks Sheriff Skyfire to fight the Rangers who "stole" the Ninja Nexus Prism. The Sheriff realizes that he's been lied to him and decides to fight alongside the Rangers as an officer of the space police.
37	15	"Tech Support"	Oliver Driver	Alwyn Dale, Chip Lynn, and Becca Barnes	September 29, 2018	0.81
Brody gives karate lessons to Emma, a computer specialist who dreams of fighting alongside the Power Rangers. At the same time, Typeface, a new monster sent by Madame Odius, is trying to render the Power Rangers weapons inoperative using a computer virus.
38	16	"Car Trouble"	Oliver Driver	Chip Lynn, Becca Barnes, and Alwyn Dale	October 6, 2018	0.74
A new monster, Voltipede, is sent to Earth to fight the Super Ninja Steel Rangers. It steals electricity from cars and the city to charge itself with energy and power. He is a formidable adversary, but the rangers, helped by the Lion Fire Zord, manage to defeat him.
39	17	"Happy To Be Me"	Ric Pellizzeri	Becca Barnes, Alwyn Dale, & Chip Lynn	October 13, 2018	0.85
Thanks to the Ninja Power Star he stole, Tynamon thinks he can defeat the Super Ninja Steel Rangers. But, the Power Stars only react to a Super Ninja Steel Rangers voice. So, he decides to steal the voice of a Ranger, which will be Levi.
40	18	"Monster Mix-Up"	Murray Keane	Becca Barnes, Alwyn Dale, and Uther Dean	October 20, 2018	0.83
The Rangers are ambushed by Versix and monsters who switch bodies with them on Halloween.
41	19	"Magic Misfire"	Simon Bennett	Chip Lynn, Alwyn Dale, & Becca Barnes	October 27, 2018	1.04
Tynamon asks Madame Odius to make him grow. She accepts, but only if he can capture Mick and defeat the Super Ninja Steel Rangers. She gives him a weapon that can put the victim under her control. Thanks to this, he can capture Mick. Madame Odius wants to use him for her ultimate plan.
42	20	"Doom Signal"	Ric Pellizzeri	Chip Lynn, Becca Barnes, & Alwyn Dale	November 3, 2018	0.89
Madame Odius hosts auditions for a new Galaxy Warriors TV show that will manipulate the minds of its audience worldwide.
43	21	"Reaching the Nexus"	Ric Pellizzeri	Becca Barnes, Alwyn Dale, & Chip Lynn	November 10, 2018	0.89
After merging with the Ninja Nexus Prism, Madame Odius reaches her ultimate form, and presents the Rangers with their final test.
44	22	"The Poisy Show"	Murray Keane	Chip Lynn, Becca Barnes, and Alwyn Dale	December 1, 2018	0.78
The Rangers look to celebrate Christmas but find their holiday cheer interrupted by Sledge. Preston reunites with Koda to put an end to Sledge and his crew. Guest Stars: Jason Faunt, Yoshi Sudarso.

== Comics ==
In 2018, the Ninja Steel Rangers appeared in Boom! Studios' "Shattered Grid", a crossover event between teams from all eras commemorating the 25th anniversary of the original television series. It was published in Mighty Morphin Power Rangers #25–30 and various tie-ins. A Power Rangers Ninja Steel story by Becca Barnes, Alwyn Dale and Simone Di Meo was published in Mighty Morphin Power Rangers 2018 Annual as part of the crossover.

A Power Rangers Ninja Steel story by Mat Groom, Michael Busuttil and Lucas Werneck was published the same year in Mighty Morphin Power Rangers 25th Anniversary Special #1.
