= Li Ming Hu =

New Zealand actress (born 1987)

- Born: June 22, 1987 (age 39); Palmerston North, New Zealand
- Education: University of Auckland
- Occupation: Actress
- Years active: 1996–present
- Known for: Shortland Street as Li Mei Chen; Power Rangers RPM as Gemma/RPM Operator Silver

Li-Ming Hu (born June 22, 1987), is a New Zealand artist and former actress. She is best known for playing Li Mei Chen in Shortland Street, Gemma/RPM Operator Silver in Power Rangers RPM, and Lisa Fong in the short film Take 3.

== Biography ==
Hu was born to Chinese-Singaporean immigrant parents in Palmerston North. After receiving her master's degree in history from the University of Auckland, she started her acting career at Shortland Street portraying Li Mei Chen, who was once described as "mean and cantankerous". Her character initially began as a medical student, who quickly graduated to doctor, and was known for her ambition and abrasive manner. After a three-year stint, Li Mei was killed off with a deadly virus.

Hu was a Treasure Island contestant and television presenter, and starred as Gemma/RPM Operator Silver in Power Rangers RPM, which she later reprised nine years later in Power Rangers Super Ninja Steel.

=== Other interests ===
Hu also holds a Master of Arts degree in history from the University of Auckland, where she also tutored. She worked at the New Zealand Human Rights Commission for a number of years, and was working on a visual arts degree at Auckland University of Technology, with a focus on sculpture, installation and performance.

Hu also starred with Andy Wong in Lantern, a stage play in which both of them together play ten characters in total.

Hu later emigrated to the United States and as of 2018, was in the School of the Art Institute of Chicago masters programme. She is an artist who is part of the Riff Raff duo alongside Daphne Simons and has appeared at the Art Institute of Chicago and in Wassaic, New York. Hu is also a musician who formed half of the musical project The Tokey Tones with Scott Mannion.

She lives in New York City.

== Filmography ==
=== Television ===
- Xena: Warrior Princess, Amazon
- Shortland Street, Li Mei Chen
- Spin Doctors (two seasons)
- Power Rangers RPM, Gemma/RPM Operator Silver
- The Shannara Chronicles, Advisor Shona
- Power Rangers Super Ninja Steel, Gemma/RPM Operator Silver

=== Film ===
- Take 3
- Kawa, Alice
