= Backyard Dogs =

2000 sports film by Robert Boris

- Movie poster
- Directed by: Robert Boris
- Written by: Robert Boris
- Produced by: Barry Barnholtz
- Starring: Scott Hamm; Bree Turner; Walter Emanuel Jones; Roger Fan
- Cinematography: Michael Chambliss
- Edited by: Christopher Roth
- Music by: Billy White Acre
- Production companies: Barnholtz Entertainment; PM Entertainment Group
- Release date: 2000
- Running time: 96 minutes
- Country: United States
- Language: English

Backyard Dogs is a 2000 sports film written and directed by Robert Boris.

== Premise ==
Two best friends with dreams of becoming professional wrestlers start wrestling in underground backyard events.

== Cast ==
Actor	Role
Scott Hamm	Cole Davis
Bree Turner	Kristy James
Roger Fan	Rick Holmes
Dale Evans	Voodoo Jones
Vincent Van Patten	ZZ Nash
James Van Patten	Parker Nash
Frankie Kazarian	Snake Duggan
Torrey Dickinson	The Raptor
Walter Emanuel Jones	Lee Takura
Hayabusa	Himself

== Reception ==
A review of the DVD version of the film stated, "Given the subject, the ultra-low-budget image is acceptable. On the commentary track, writer/director Robert Boris says that the film was shot on digital video on 18 locations in 18 days. The film makes many of Roger Corman’s famous quickie productions look positively polished. But the movie also has the energy and spirit of early Cormans, too."
