= Mighty Morphin Power Rangers: The Movie =

1995 film directed by Bryan Spicer

- Theatrical release poster
- Directed by: Bryan Spicer
- Screenplay by: Arne Olsen
- Story by: John Kamps; Arne Olsen
- Based on: Kyōryū Sentai Zyuranger; Gosei Sentai Dairanger; Ninja Sentai Kakuranger by Toei Company Power Rangers by Haim Saban; Shuki Levy
- Produced by: Haim Saban; Shuki Levy; Suzanne Todd
- Starring: Karan Ashley; Johnny Yong Bosch; Steve Cardenas; Jason David Frank; Amy Jo Johnson; David Yost; Jason Narvy; Paul Schrier; Paul Freeman
- Cinematography: Paul Murphy
- Edited by: Wayne Wahrman
- Music by: Graeme Revell
- Production companies: Saban Entertainment; Toei Company; Fox Family Films
- Distributed by: 20th Century Fox
- Release date: June 30, 1995
- Running time: 96 minutes
- Country: United States
- Language: English
- Budget: $15 million
- Box office: $66.4 million

Mighty Morphin Power Rangers: The Movie is a 1995 American superhero film. It stars the ensemble cast of Karan Ashley, Johnny Yong Bosch, Steve Cardenas, Jason David Frank, Amy Jo Johnson, and David Yost alongside the villains cast from the original series and Paul Freeman as Ivan Ooze. It is the first installment in Power Rangers film series. Much like the television season that followed the release, it used concepts from the Japanese Super Sentai series Kyōryū Sentai Zyuranger, Gosei Sentai Dairanger and Ninja Sentai Kakuranger. It is the first Power Rangers production from Saban Entertainment (later Hasbro) not to feature any archived footage from Super Sentai. The film is not part of the franchise continuity as the movie takes place in an alternate timeline.

The film was released in between the second and third seasons of Mighty Morphin Power Rangers.

== Plot ==
A group of teenagers from Angel Grove, California secretly serve as the Power Rangers, a team of super-powered humans who use their abilities to defend the Earth from otherworldly threats. After participating in a charity skydive for the local observatory, the Rangers are informed by their leader, Zordon, that the hyperlock chamber imprisoning Ivan Ooze, a morphological being who once ruled the Earth, has been uncovered at a local construction site. He sends the Rangers to intercept the chamber before it is opened; however, Lord Zedd, Rita Repulsa, Goldar and Mordant arrive at the construction site before them and release Ivan. The Rangers confront Ivan, who unleashes Oozemen to battle them. While the Rangers defeat the Oozemen, the distraction allows Ivan to escape. He lays siege to their Command Center, incapacitating Zordon, the one who imprisoned him, and destroying the Rangers' powers.

The Rangers return to the Command Center, finding it destroyed and Zordon outside his time warp, slowly dying, his only consolation being that the Rangers themselves are unharmed. Using the last remaining power in the Command Center, Zordon's assistant Alpha 5 sends the Rangers to the distant planet Phaedos to seek and obtain the Great Power, which can revive Zordon. Meanwhile, Ivan Ooze usurps Rita and Lord Zedd, forcing Goldar and Mordant to be his servants, before sending his Tengu warriors to Phaedos after the Rangers. After arriving on Phaedos, the Rangers battle the Tengu but they are rescued by Dulcea, the planet's Master Warrior. After hearing of Zordon's plight, she agrees to help and takes them to an ancient temple, where she awakens each Rangers' animal spirit; Aisha Campbell is the bear, Rocky DeSantos is the ape (specifically, the gorilla; the chimpanzee in the TV series), Billy Cranston is the wolf, Kimberly Hart is the crane, Adam Park is the frog, and Tommy Oliver is the falcon. Unable to leave the temple without ageing rapidly, Dulcea transforms into an owl. The Rangers head for the Monolith housing the Great Power. They defeat a living dinosaur skeleton and then the temple's stone guardians, after which they retrieve the Great Power, restoring their Ranger suits and powers.

Back on Earth, Ivan begins selling his ooze as a children's toy, which he uses to hypnotize their parents into serving him. He then begins excavating his Ecto-Morphicons, twin war machines built during his reign. After seeing his father serving Ivan, Fred Kelman, a friend of the Rangers, realizes Ivan's plans. Once the Ecto-Morphicons are excavated, Ivan unleashes them on Angel Grove, ordering the parents to walk off a cliff, prompting Fred to recruit other kids to save them. The Rangers return to Earth and use their new animal Ninja Zords to fight Ivan's Ecto-Morphicons. After a difficult battle, they destroy the first machine, Scorpitron. Ivan takes control of the other machine, Hornitor, and battles the Rangers, who combine their Zords to form the Ninja Megazord and later the Ninja Mega Falconzord. The Rangers lure Ivan into space and knock him into the path of Ryan's Comet, which destroys him, breaking his spell on the parents, who are reunited with their children, and freeing Zedd and Rita. The Rangers return to the Command Center to find Zordon has died, much to their dismay. But, instead of giving up, they use the Great Power to restore the Command Center and resurrect Zordon, returning him to his time warp. A celebration is held at Angel Grove's Harbor in honor of the Power Rangers.

In a mid-credits scene, Rita and Zedd escape the snowglobe and return to their base.

== Cast ==
- Karan Ashley as Aisha Campbell / Yellow Ranger
- Johnny Yong Bosch as Adam Park / Black Ranger
- Steve Cardenas as Rocky DeSantos / Red Ranger
- Jason David Frank as Tommy Oliver / White Ranger
- Amy Jo Johnson as Kimberly Hart / Pink Ranger
- David Yost as Billy Cranston / Blue Ranger
- Paul Schrier as Farkas "Bulk" Bulkmeier
- Jason Narvy as Eugene "Skull" Skullovitch
- Paul Freeman as Ivan Ooze
- Gabrielle Fitzpatrick as Dulcea
- Nicholas Bell as Zordon
- Peta-Marie Rixon as Alpha 5
- Jean Paul Bell as Mordant
- Kerry Casey as Goldar
- Mark Ginther as Lord Zedd
- Julia Cortez as Rita Repulsa
- Jamie Croft as Fred Kelman
- Peter Mochrie as Mr. Kelman
- Paul Goddard and Robert Simper as Construction workers.
- Ritchie Singer as MC

Voices

- Kerrigan Mahan as Goldar
- Robert L. Manahan as Zordon
- Robert Axelrod as Lord Zedd
- Barbara Goodson as Rita Repulsa
- Richard Wood as Alpha 5
- Martin G. Metcalf as Mordant

== Production ==
Filming took place in and around Bombo Quarry, Sydney, and Queensland in Australia.

Gabrielle Fitzpatrick, who played Dulcea, was diagnosed with an ovarian cyst before set call on November 2nd, and required immediate surgery to have it removed. Mariska Hargitay was hired to replace her, and production resumed. According to Paul Matthews, the art department electrician for the film, Hargitay was later stood down on December 20th because "she just didn't cut it". According to Hargitay, "they had me on hold a lot", and she returned home for Christmas near December 21st. Then, she found out that she had been fired when she called "them" on January 3rd. By the time of some critical shoots starting 8th January 1995, Fitzpatrick had recovered from her operation, and returned to her role.

According to Matthews, the film underwent numerous changes during filming.

== Soundtrack ==
Mighty Morphin Power Rangers The Movie: Original Soundtrack Album

Soundtrack album by Various Artists
- Released: June 8, 1995
- Recorded: 1994–1995
- Length: 49:53
- Labels: Fox Music; Saban
- Producers: Happy Walters (exec); Pilar McCurry (exec)

Singles from Mighty Morphin Power Rangers The Movie: Original Soundtrack Album
- 1. "Go Go Power Rangers" Released: May 30, 1995; 2. "Trouble" Released: July 18, 1994

Mighty Morphin Power Rangers The Movie: Original Soundtrack Album is the licensed soundtrack to the film. It was released by Fox Records and Saban Records on June 8, 1995, on audio CD and cassette.

Despite several of the songs heard in the movie being well known and older, the album featured the highest profile musical talent the series had been associated with up until that point. The music of Van Halen, They Might Be Giants, Devo, Red Hot Chili Peppers, Roxette, Dan Hartman, and Buckethead was used throughout the film. The single released to promote the soundtrack was Shampoo's "Trouble", although the commercials for the film used both this and Snap!'s hit "The Power".

=== Track list ===
1. The Power Rangers Orchestra – "Go Go Power Rangers"
2. Red Hot Chili Peppers – "Higher Ground"
3. Shampoo – "Trouble"
4. Devo – "Are You Ready?!"
5. Snap! – "The Power" produced by Snap!
6. Fun Tomas (featuring Carl Douglas) – "Kung Fu Dancing"
7. Van Halen – "Dreams"
8. Dan Hartman – "Free Ride"
9. They Might Be Giants – "Sensurround"
10. Power Jet – "Ayeyaiyai" (Alpha Song)
11. Graeme Revell – "Firebird"
12. Aaron Waters (The Mighty Raw) – "Cross My Line" (bonus track)

=== Additional artists ===
The Power Rangers Orchestra consisted of Eric Martin of Mr. Big, renowned studio guitarist Tim Pierce, John Pierce of Pablo Cruise on bass, singer-pianist Kim Bullard, and Matt Sorum of Guns N' Roses and Velvet Revolver on drums. (Note: Retrieved from the soundtrack's booklet.) The solo on the track "Firebird" is performed by Buckethead.

== Music ==
Mighty Morphin Power Rangers The Movie: Original Motion Picture Score

Soundtrack album by Graeme Revell
- Released: June 6, 1995
- Recorded: 1994-1995
- Length: 35:24
- Label: Varèse Sarabande
- Producers: Graeme Revell; Robert Townson (exec)

Mighty Morphin Power Rangers The Movie: Original Motion Picture Score is the soundtrack of the score to the movie, released by Varèse Sarabande on June 6, 1995, on Audio CD and Compact Cassette. This release features most of the film score by composer Graeme Revell, except for the track called "Firebird" which he performed along with guitarists Carl Verheyen and Buckethead; this was included in the film's previous soundtrack. The score was performed by the West Australian Symphony Orchestra with orchestrator Tim Simonec conducting.

=== Track list ===
1. "Prologue"
2. "Ivan Ooze"
3. "The Great Power/Ninja Power"
4. "The Tengu's Attack"
5. "Zordon is Dying"
6. "The Rangers on Phaedos"
7. "Dulcea to the Rescue"
8. "Journey to the Plateau"
9. "Summoning the Ninjetti/Ninja Ranger"
10. "Jurassic Ride"
11. "The Monolith"
12. "Battle With the Gatekeepers"
13. "Metamorphicons Confront the Rangers"
14. "The Megazord Battle"
15. "Leap to Our Doom"
16. "Power Rangers Triumph"
17. "Freddy to the Rescue"
18. "Zordon is Saved"

=== Soundtrack credits ===
- Produced by Graeme Revell
- Executive Producer: Robert Townson
- Music Orchestrated and Conducted by Tim Simonec
- Additional Orchestrations by Ken Kugler, Larry Kenton and Mark Gasbarro
- Performed by the West Australian Symphony Orchestra
- Music Scoring Mixer: Dan Wallin
- Assisted by Malcolm Luker
- Music Editor: Josh Winget

== Release ==
=== Theatrical ===
Mighty Morphin Power Rangers: The Movie was released theatrically in the United States on June 30, 1995, by 20th Century Fox.

=== Marketing ===
Family entertainment center chain Discovery Zone promoted the release of the film by giving away Power Rangers Wrist Activators (with 33 messages) to customers who bought a Discovery Zone Summer Power Pass. Discovery Zone also gave away one of six Power Rangers Movie Challenge cards for free during each visit. This promotion lasted the entire summer.

=== Home media ===
Mighty Morphin Power Rangers: The Movie was released on VHS in the United States by 20th Century Fox Home Entertainment in November 1995. In 2001, the film was released on DVD as a double feature with Turbo: A Power Rangers Movie (1997). A standalone DVD edition followed on September 2, 2003. A two-film DVD collection containing both Mighty Morphin Power Rangers: The Movie and Turbo: A Power Rangers Movie was released in the United Kingdom on January 28, 2013.

The film made its Blu-ray debut on August 7, 2018, as part of Shout! Factory's 25th-anniversary SteelBook collection of the original Mighty Morphin Power Rangers television series. The 20-disc collection contained 19 DVDs and one Blu-ray, which featured the film alongside newly produced interviews with director Bryan Spicer and actors Johnny Yong Bosch and Paul Freeman. Shout! Factory subsequently released the film as a standalone Blu-ray on June 4, 2019, retaining the retrospective interviews, an original featurette and the theatrical trailer.

== Reception ==
=== Box office ===
Mighty Morphin Power Rangers: The Movie grossed $13.1 million during its opening weekend, finishing fourth at the North American box office behind Apollo 13, Pocahontas and Batman Forever. Its earnings rose to approximately $17 million over the five-day Independence Day holiday period. The film ultimately grossed $38.2 million domestically and $66.4 million worldwide.

=== Critical response ===
The film received mixed reviews from critics, who praised its action sequences and performances, but felt that it was nothing more than a longer episode of the series with better special effects, pointing to the plot and screenplay as the main faults.

On the review aggregator website Rotten Tomatoes, 30% of 40 critics gave the film a positive review, with an average rating of 4.3/10. The site's critics consensus reads, "For better and for worse -- too often the latter -- Mighty Morphin Power Rangers: The Movie captures the thoroughly strange aesthetic of the television series that inspired it." Metacritic gave the film a weighted average score of 40 out of 100, based on reviews from 21 critics, indicating "mixed or average reviews". Audiences polled by CinemaScore gave the film an average grade of "A−" on an A+ to F scale.

Kevin Thomas of the Los Angeles Times thought it was characterized by "a barrage of spectacular special effects, a slew of fantastic monsters, a ferociously funny villain—and, most important, a refreshing lack of pretentiousness." Thomas lauded director Bryan Spicer for raising the quality of production values for a feature film adaptation of the TV series while maintaining a likable "comic-book look and sense of wonder" and wholesome high school characters parents would approve of.

Caryn James of The New York Times thought that story-wise, it resembles multiple episodes of the television series strung together with slightly better special effects, and that the result was loud, headache-inducing and boring for adults, but that children would enjoy it. James further stated that too much of its running time is spent showing the Rangers without their powers. Roger Ebert gave it only half a star out of a possible four stars, saying that it is "as close as you can get to absolute nothing and still have a product to project on the screen," comparing it to synthetic foods in brightly marketed packaging with no nutritional content. He felt that the characters, with the exception of Ivan Ooze ("curious that, 6 thousand years ago, he would have had an English name"), lacked personalities, and that the scenes of monsters rampaging through the city hearkened back to the worst Japanese monster films. Mick LaSalle of the San Francisco Chronicle found the fights "only adequately choreographed," called the battle in the climax "a complete disaster" and stating that it made no sense in timing, that protagonists were not very intelligent, and the actors playing them unremarkable.

== Other media ==
=== Video games ===
Mighty Morphin Power Rangers: The Movie based on the film was released for four different platforms the Super NES, Sega Genesis, Game Boy, and Game Gear.

=== Comic books ===
Marvel Comics published two comic book adaptations of Mighty Morphin Power Rangers: The Movie in September 1995. The conventional comic adaptation was written by Nel Yomtov and illustrated by Ron Lim, with inks by several artists, including Jimmy Palmiotti and Mark McKenna. Marvel also released a photographic adaptation using images from the film.

== Subsequent films ==
The next theatrical film in the Power Rangers franchise was Turbo: A Power Rangers Movie, released by 20th Century Fox on March 28, 1997. The franchise was subsequently rebooted theatrically with Power Rangers in 2017.

== Legacy ==
Mighty Morphin Power Rangers: The Movie has developed a cult following, particularly among fans of the television series and 1990s popular culture. In a 2020 retrospective for Den of Geek, Shamus Kelley described the film as a cult classic, highlighting Paul Freeman's performance as Ivan Ooze and its action sequences, while acknowledging its dated computer-generated imagery and shortcomings in storytelling.

Retrospective assessments have frequently discussed the film's nostalgic appeal alongside its technical limitations. On its twentieth anniversary in 2015, James Tison of Bustle reflected on his childhood enjoyment of the film, but found its special effects and commercial elements less appealing when revisiting it as an adult. Writing for Gizmodo on the film's thirtieth anniversary in 2025, James Whitbrook similarly noted the ageing computer-generated effects and excessive spectacle, but praised the humour of the climactic battle between the Rangers and Ivan Ooze.

A retrospective oral history published in April 2025 featured interviews with members of the cast and crew, including Freeman, Karan Ashley, Johnny Yong Bosch and screenwriters Arne Olsen and John Kamps. Reflecting on his involvement, Bosch described the film as a formative experience that helped him develop his acting and stunt skills and influenced his subsequent career.
