= Mighty Morphin Power Rangers: Rita's Rewind =

2024 video game

- Developer: Digital Eclipse
- Publisher: Digital Eclipse
- Composer: Sean Bialo
- Series: Power Rangers
- Platforms: Nintendo Switch; PlayStation 4; PlayStation 5; Windows; Xbox One; Xbox Series X/S
- Release: December 10, 2024
- Genre: Beat 'em up
- Modes: Single-player, multiplayer

Mighty Morphin Power Rangers: Rita's Rewind is a 2024 beat 'em up video game developed and published by Digital Eclipse as part of Hasbro's Retro Arcade initiative. The game follows the Power Rangers as they face off against a robotic reincarnation of their nemesis Rita Repulsa who has travelled back in time to team up with her past self.

Mighty Morphin Power Rangers: Rita's Rewind was released for PlayStation 4, PlayStation 5, Windows (via Steam), Xbox One, Xbox Series X/S, and Nintendo Switch on December 10, 2024.

== Gameplay ==
Mighty Morphin Power Rangers: Rita's Rewind is an action-adventure side-scrolling video game with occasional on-rails segments. The gameplay features a mix of combat, puzzle-solving, and exploration across iconic locations from the franchise. Players can switch between different Rangers, each with unique abilities, to tackle challenges and enemies.

== Plot ==
The Power Rangers face off against a robotic reincarnation of the Power Rangers' long-time nemesis, Rita Repulsa. Robo-Rita, who hails from the distant future, has conjured a portal to send herself back in time so she can finally vanquish the Power Rangers by forming an alliance with her original self. Working together, Robo-Rita and Rita Repulsa aim to rewind, rewrite, and remix the past in an attempt to stop the very formation of the Power Rangers; altering the course of history. It's up to the Rangers to counter this catastrophic chronological collaboration, all while dealing with the two Ritas and their assorted army of monstrous enemies from across the MMPR timeline.

== Development and promotion ==
Mighty Morphin Power Rangers was first shown during Summer Game Fest 2024 with a gameplay trailer.

== Release ==
Mighty Morphin Power Rangers: Rita's Rewind released for PlayStation 4, PlayStation 5, Windows (via Steam), Xbox One, Xbox Series X/S and Nintendo Switch on December 10, 2024.

On January 29, 2025, Digital Eclipse's owner Atari announced that they would co-publish and distribute a physical version of the game for the PlayStation 5 and Nintendo Switch on May 30, 2025.

== Music ==
Atari Music released Mighty Morphin Power Rangers: Rita's Rewind Original Soundtrack on July 18, 2025, which was composed by Sean Bialo.

== Comic book ==
Mighty Morphin Power Rangers: Rita's Rewind #1, a 42-page standalone one-shot comic book published by Boom! Studios, was released on August 6, 2025. It acts as a tie-in to the video game, as well as a continuation of Mighty Morphin Power Rangers: Once & Always (2023).
