= Turbo: A Power Rangers Movie =

1997 film directed by Shuki Levy and David Winning

- Theatrical release poster
- Directed by: David Winning; Shuki Levy
- Written by: Shuki Levy; Shell Danielson
- Based on: Gekisou Sentai Carranger by Toei Company Power Rangers by Haim Saban; Shuki Levy
- Produced by: Jonathan Tzachor
- Starring: Johnny Yong Bosch; Nakia Burrise; Steve Cardenas; Jason David Frank; Austin St. John; Catherine Sutherland; Jason Narvy; Paul Schrier; Hilary Shepard; Amy Jo Johnson; Blake Foster
- Cinematography: Ilan Rosenberg
- Edited by: Henry Richardson; B.J. Sears
- Music by: Shuki Levy; Inon Zur
- Production companies: Saban Entertainment; Toei Company; Fox Family Films
- Distributed by: 20th Century Fox
- Release date: March 28, 1997
- Running time: 99 minutes
- Country: United States
- Language: English
- Box office: $9.6 million

Turbo: A Power Rangers Movie is a 1997 American superhero film directed by David Winning and Shuki Levy and written by Levy and Shell Danielson. It is the second installment in Power Rangers film series and a standalone sequel to Mighty Morphin Power Rangers: The Movie (1995). It was produced by Saban Entertainment and Toei Company, Ltd., and was distributed by 20th Century Fox. The film stars Johnny Yong Bosch, Nakia Burrise, Steve Cardenas, Jason David Frank, Austin St. John, Catherine Sutherland, Jason Narvy, Paul Schrier, Hilary Shepard Turner, Amy Jo Johnson, and Blake Foster.

Taking place after the events of Power Rangers Zeo, the new cast and characters from the film become cast members of Zeo' s successor series, Power Rangers Turbo, with the film's events leading into the successor series. As with its television season, the film used concepts and costumes from the Japanese Super Sentai series Gekisou Sentai Carranger. Sets and costumes created for original characters in the film were later used in the television series, with the film's climactic antagonist Maligore being reused for the evil Dark Specter in the subsequent Power Rangers in Space season.

The film was released on March 28, 1997, to generally negative reviews. It was criticized for its visual effects and campiness, but critics praised the performance of its cast.

== Plot ==
On the planet Liaria, a wizard named Lerigot is being hunted down by Divatox; an intergalactic space pirate, who seeks his golden key to traverse an inter-dimensional gateway and enter into matrimony with Maligore, an imprisoned demon who promises her great riches and power. Lerigot escapes Divatox's forces and travels to Earth in search of Zordon and his friend Alpha 5, but inadvertently arrives in Africa. Weakened by the sun's ultraviolet rays, Lerigot meets a tribe of chimpanzees and wanders off with them. Meanwhile, Divatox heads for Earth in pursuit.

In Angel Grove, Rocky DeSantos, Adam Park, and Tommy Oliver train for a charity fighting competition to save the Youth Shelter, when Rocky accidentally injures his back. Katherine Hillard and Tanya Sloan arrive with Justin Stewart, a child who admires Rocky and frequents the shelter. As Rocky is taken to a hospital, Justin follows the group and learns they are Power Rangers. Zordon sends Tommy and Katherine to search for Lerigot. They find him and return to the Power Chamber.

Searching for two human sacrifices to revive Maligore, Divatox's nephew Elgar, abducts Farkus "Bulk" Bulkmeier and Eugene "Skull" Skullovitch, but Divatox rejects them for not being pure of heart. Upon finding Kimberly Hart and Jason Lee Scott, who are scuba diving nearby, Divatox captures them using her periscope as her new targets for evil. While recovering, Lerigot is contacted by Divatox, who has captured his family and demands he surrender himself. Divatox also uses Kimberly and Jason to pressure the Rangers. At the exchange site, Elgar tricks the Rangers and captures Lerigot.

Zordon and Alpha create new powers for the Rangers to defeat Divatox. With these new Turbo powers and new vehicular Turbo Zords, the Rangers travel across the desert to a ship called the Ghost Galleon. They are joined by Justin, who has received Rocky's Blue Ranger powers during his recovery. On Divatox's submarine, Jason and Kimberly devise an escape plan, but though Bulk, Skull, and Kimberly escape the sub, Jason is trapped and left behind.

After Divatox and the Rangers traverse the Nemesis Triangle and reach the island where Maligore is, Divatox destroys the Ghost Galleon and the Rangers narrowly escape. Kimberly is recaptured and brought to Divatox by the tribal natives of the island who worship Maligore as their god. At the temple in the volcano, the Rangers fail to free Jason and Kimberly before they are possessed by Maligore and attack the Rangers mercilessly, but the Rangers succeed in freeing Lerigot and his wife Yara, who undo the possession.

A frustrated Divatox sacrifices her nephew and successfully revives Maligore. The Rangers combined their Turbo Zords and form the Turbo Megazord to fight Maligore. They defeat him as Divatox and Rygog flee, vowing evil will win one day.

== Cast ==
- Johnny Yong Bosch as Adam Park / Green Turbo Ranger, a martial artist originally from Stone Canyon and formerly, the new Black Mighty Morphin Power Ranger and Green Zeo Ranger. He pilots the Desert Thunder Turbozord.
- Nakia Burrise as Tanya Sloan / Yellow Turbo Ranger, an orphaned girl from Africa and formerly, the Yellow Zeo Ranger. She pilots the Dune Star Turbozord.
- Steve Cardenas as Rocky DeSantos, a martial artist originally from Stone Canyon and formerly, the new Red Mighty Morphin Power Ranger and Blue Zeo Ranger.
- Jason David Frank as Tommy Oliver / Red Turbo Ranger, the leader of the Power Rangers, Katherine's current love interest and formerly, the Green/White Mighty Morphin Power Ranger, and Red Zeo Ranger. He pilots the Red Lightning Turbozord.
- Austin St. John as Jason Lee Scott, the original Red Mighty Morphin Power Ranger and formerly the Gold Zeo Ranger.
- Catherine Sutherland as Katherine "Kat" Hillard / Pink Turbo Ranger, an Australian teenager and Tommy's current love interest and formerly, the new Pink Mighty Morphin Power Ranger and Pink Zeo Ranger. She pilots the Wind Chaser Turbozord.
- Jason Narvy as Eugene "Skull" Skullovitch, a young police officer working at Angel Grove.
- Paul Schrier as Farkus "Bulk" Bulkmeier, a young police officer working at Angel Grove.
- Hilary Shepard Turner as Divatox the evil pirate queen, who seeks to marry the demon Maligore and conquer the galaxy.
- Amy Jo Johnson as Kimberly Hart, the original Pink Mighty Morphin Power Ranger and Tommy's former love interest.
- Blake Foster as Justin Stewart / Blue Turbo Ranger, a child in the care of Tanya and Katherine at an Angel Grove shelter. He becomes the Blue Turbo Ranger in Rocky's place and pilots the Mountain Blaster Turbozord.

Additionally, Gregg Bullock reprises his role as Lt. Jerome Stone from Power Rangers Zeo. Richard Genelle reprises his role as Ernie, the Angel Grove Gym and Juice Bar's owner; Winston Richard plays Zordon, an inter-dimensional wizard and the Rangers' mentor, with Bob Manahan voicing the character; and Donene Kistler plays Alpha 5, a robot from Edenoi and Zordon's assistant, with Richard Wood voicing Alpha 5. Jon Simanton portrays Lerigot, a wizard who holds a magical key that can open portals to worlds and realms, while Lex Lang provided the voice for the character. Divatox's henchmen includes Lang also voices Rygog, one of Divatox's henchmen. J.B. Levine voice Yara and Bethel, Lerigot's wife and daughter. Danny Wayne Stallcup physically portrays Elgar, Divatox's dimwitted nephew, while David Umansky provides his voice. Mike Deak portrays Maligore, Divatox's fiancé and true antagonist of this movie. Carla Perez reprises her role as Rita Repulsa, a sorceress who has fought the Power Rangers in the past, with Barbara Goodson providing her voice.

Mark A. Richardson the prop master was the body actor for Lord Zedd. Rob Axelrod provided the voice.

== Production ==
The costumes for Elgar, Maligore and the Eaglettes were built by the Chiodo Brothers.

As opposed to the CGI Megazord used in the previous film, Mighty Morphin Power Rangers: The Movie, this sequel uses a practical costume for the Turbo Megazord. The television series would instead rely on Carranger footage.

Between production of the film and television series Power Rangers Turbo, Hilary Shepard Turner took maternity leave and was initially replaced by Carol Hoyt as Divatox. Shepard resumed the role in the 26th episode, continuing through Power Rangers in Space.

== Music ==
=== Soundtrack ===
Turbo: A Power Rangers Movie (Original Motion Picture Soundtrack)

Soundtrack album by Various artists
- Released: March 18, 1997
- Recorded: 1996
- Genre: Soundtrack
- Length: 41:05
- Labels: Mercury Records; Saban Records
- Producers: Ron Kenan; Howard Paar

Turbo: A Power Rangers Movie (Original Motion Picture Soundtrack) is the licensed soundtrack to the film. It was released by Mercury Records on March 18, 1997, on Audio CD and Compact Cassette.

The album serves a dual purpose, as it not only used much of the music heard in the movie, but also contained several tracks from Power Rangers Zeo.

== Release ==
=== Home media ===
The film was released on July 8, 1997, on VHS and LaserDisc. The film (as well as 1995's Mighty Morphin Power Rangers: The Movie) was then released on a two-sided DVD disc on March 13, 2001, and then re-released on a single-sided disc in 2003. This film was re-released with different packaging in 2011. The film was then re-released in March 2017 in a bundled set with Mighty Morphin Power Rangers: The Movie to coincide with the release of the 2017 film Power Rangers.

In 2019, it was announced that Shout! Factory had acquired the rights to re-release the movie and confirmed that Turbo: A Power Rangers Movie would be released for the first time on Blu-ray. It was released on July 30, 2019.

== Reception ==
=== Box office ===
Turbo: A Power Rangers Movie opened theatrically on March 28, 1997, in 2,113 venues. It earned $3.3 million in its opening weekend, ranking number seven in the domestic box office. At the end of its run, the film had grossed $8.4 million in North America and $1.3 million overseas for a worldwide total of $9.6 million.

=== Critical response ===
On the review aggregator website Rotten Tomatoes, 16% of 19 critics' reviews are positive, with an average rating of 3.8/10. The website's consensus reads: "No no, Power Rangers." Metacritic, which uses a weighted average, assigned the film a score of 35 out of 100, based on 9 critics, indicating "generally unfavorable" reviews. Audiences surveyed by CinemaScore gave the film a grade B on scale of A to F.

Joe Leydon of Variety criticized the "high-camp cheesiness" and praised the acting of both Hilary Shepard Turner and Amy Jo Johnson.

Lawrence Van Gelder of The New York Times has mixed feelings on the film, criticizing the storyline and dialogue and praising the visual effects and production values.

Rita Kempley of The Washington Post called it "A purgatory of low-budget interplanetary adventure."

Kevin Thomas of the Los Angeles Times gave a positive review, saying the filmmakers have brought "much panache and sophistication to the making of this fantasy adventure extolling the good old-fashioned virtues of spirit and courage embodied by the Power Rangers" and that "Turbo is a solid follow-up." He also praised Turner's acting and the visual effects.

=== Accolades ===
Blake Foster was nominated for the Young Artist Award for Best Leading Young Actor in a Feature Film at the 19th Youth in Film Awards in 1998.

== Sequel ==
The film was followed by another standalone sequel, Mighty Morphin Power Rangers: Once & Always (2023).

== See also ==
- List of American films of 1997
- Mighty Morphin Power Rangers: The Movie
- Power Rangers
