= Catherine Sutherland =

Australian actress (born 1974)

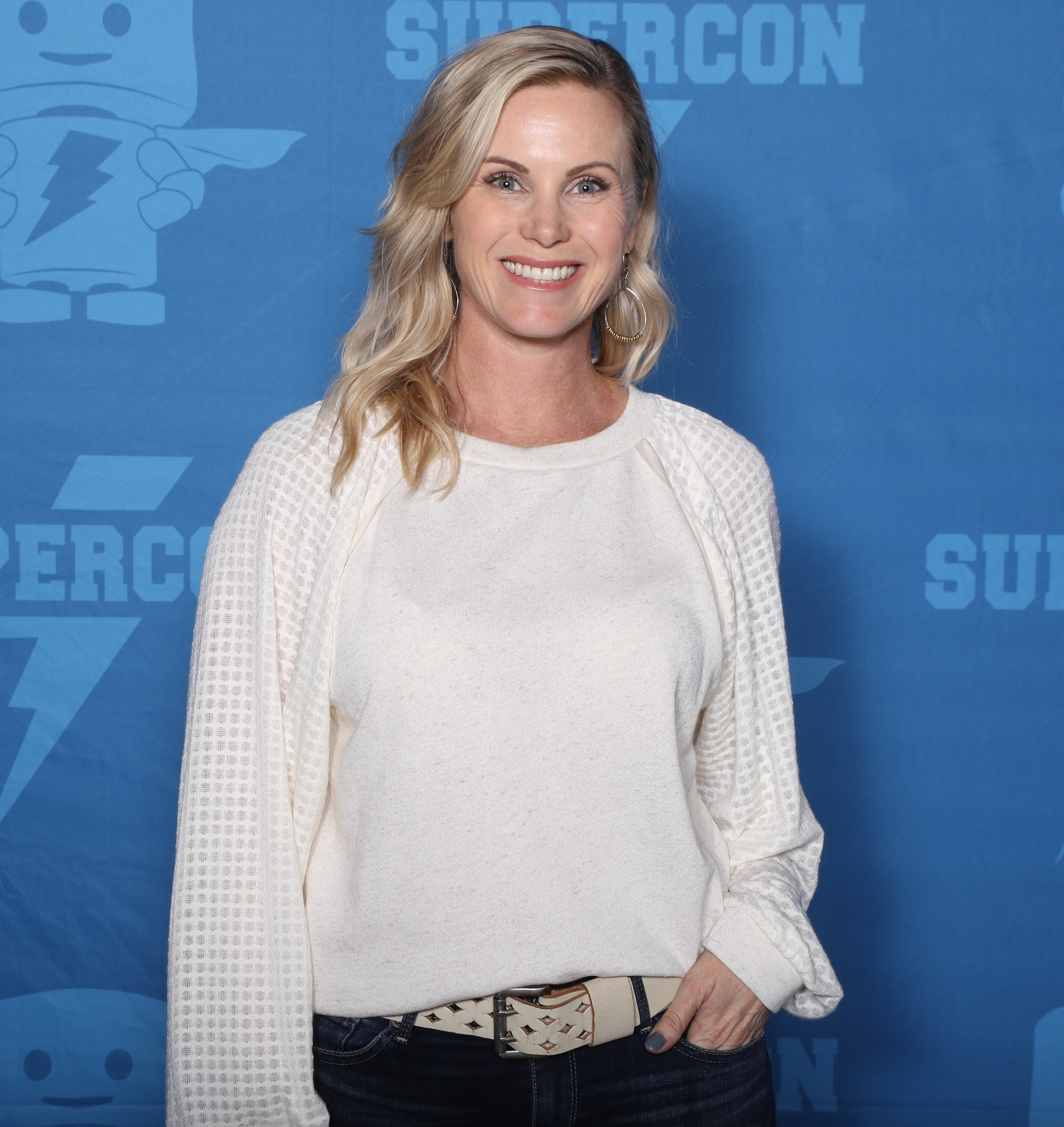
- Sutherland in 2018
- Born: Catherine Jane Sutherland; 24 October 1974 (age 52); New South Wales, Australia
- Citizenship: Australia; US
- Education: McDonald College of Performing Arts; Australia's National Institute of Dramatic Arts; Ensemble Acting Studios
- Occupation: Actress
- Years active: 1995–present
- Spouse: Daniel Chilson (m. 2002)
- Children: 2

Catherine Jane Sutherland (born 24 October 1974) is an Australian-American actress. She is known for her portrayal of Kat Hillard, the second Pink Power Ranger and later, the Pink Zeo Ranger and the first Pink Turbo Ranger in the Power Rangers television series.

Sutherland also appeared in the 2000 film The Cell, though her speaking part was cut out of the film for its theatrical release.

== Career ==
Sutherland joined the cast of Mighty Morphin Power Rangers partway through its third season, replacing Amy Jo Johnson's character Kimberly Hart as the bearer of the title of Pink Ranger. Sutherland as Kat remained a member of the cast during the fourth season Power Rangers Zeo, the film Turbo: A Power Rangers Movie, and the fifth season Power Rangers Turbo until she left the cast mid-season and was replaced by Patricia Ja Lee as Cassie Chan. Sutherland has said that Turbo was her favourite season to work on.

Sutherland also provided voice over work for some minor characters such as in the Power Rangers Wild Force episode "Forever Red". Sutherland has also appeared with other former cast members at fan conventions.

Sutherland also appeared in the 2000 film The Cell, which cut out her speaking part for the theatrical release. She had received the role after appearing on the Australian reality show Dream Factory. She also appeared in an advertising campaign for Rice Krispies cereal in the United States.

In 2016, she was cast in the short film The Order alongside many Power Rangers alumni.

In 2018, she returned to the role of Kat Hillard for an episode of Power Rangers Super Ninja Steel entitled “Dimensions in Danger”, which celebrated the franchise's 25th anniversary. Sutherland also returned in a 30th-anniversary special titled Mighty Morphin Power Rangers: Once & Always, which was released on Netflix in 2023.

== Filmography ==
=== Film ===
Year	Title	Role	Notes
1997	Turbo: A Power Rangers Movie	Katherine "Kat" Hillard / Pink Turbo Ranger	
2000	The Cell	Anne Marie Vicksey	
2016	The Order	Ericka	Short film
2023	Mighty Morphin Power Rangers: Once & Always	Katherine "Kat" Hillard / The second Pink Ranger	Television film

=== TV ===
Year	Title	Role	Notes
1995	Mighty Morphin Power Rangers	Katherine "Kat" Hillard / The Pink Ranger	Recurring role (season 3)
1996	Mighty Morphin Alien Rangers	Katherine "Kat" Hillard / The Pink Ranger	Main role
1996	Neighbours	Receptionist / Sharon Phillips	2 episodes
1996	Sweet Valley High	Ginger	Episode: "One Big Mesa"
1996	Power Rangers Zeo	Katherine "Kat" Hillard / Pink Zeo Ranger	Main role
1997	Power Rangers Turbo	Katherine "Kat" Hillard / Pink Turbo Ranger	Main role
1998	State Coroner	Reporter	Episode: "On Thin Ice"
1999	Power Rangers: The Lost Episode	Katherine Hillard	Special episode (archival footage)
2000	The Dream Factory	Herself	
2001	Power Rangers Time Force	Dana Mitchell/Lightspeed Rescue Pink Ranger (voice)	Episode: "Time For Lightspeed," uncredited
2002	Power Rangers Wild Force	Tezzla (voice)	Episode: "Forever Red"
2015	Class Dismissed	Catherine	2 Episodes
2018	Power Rangers Ninja Steel	Katherine 'Kat' Hillard as Pink Turbo Ranger	Episode: "Dimensions in Danger"; Credited as Cat Chilson

=== Video games ===
Year	Title	Role	Notes
1997	Pitfall 3D: Beyond the Jungle	Mira (voice)	
