= List of Power Rangers cast members =

This is a list of main and recurring cast members in the Power Rangers franchise, broken down by seasons.

== Mighty Morphin Power Rangers (1993–1995, 2023) ==
- Austin St. John as Jason Lee Scott
- Walter Emanuel Jones as Zachary "Zack" Taylor
- Amy Jo Johnson as Kimberly Ann Hart
- David Yost as Billy Cranston
- Thuy Trang (deceased) as Trini Kwan
- Jason David Frank (deceased) as Tommy Oliver
- Johnny Yong Bosch as Adam Park
- Karan Ashley as Aisha Campbell
- Steve Cardenas as Rocky DeSantos
- Catherine Sutherland as Katherine "Kat" Hillard
- Charlie Kersh as Minh Kwan
- Paul Schrier as Farkas "Bulk" Bulkmeier
- Jason Narvy as Eugene "Skull" Skullovitch
- Richard Genelle (deceased) as Ernie
- Gregg Bullock – Lt. Jerome Stone
- Royce Herron – Ms. Appleby
- Machiko Soga (deceased) – Rita Repulsa [Zyuranger footage]
- Barbara Goodson – Rita Repulsa / Rita [voice actor]
- Ed Neil – Lord Zedd [suit actor]
- Robert Axelrod (deceased) – Lord Zedd & Finster [voice actor]
- Richard Steven Horvitz – Alpha 5, Alpha 8 & Alpha 9 [voice actor]
- David Fielding – Zordon [Portrayal & Initially Voiced]
- Bob Manahan (deceased) – Zordon [voice actor]
- Kerrigan Mahan – Goldar [voice actor]
- Ami Kawai – Scorpina [Zyuranger footage]
- Bob Papenbrook (deceased) – Rito Revolto [voice actor]
- Romy J. Sharf – Alpha 5 [suit actor]
- Audri Dubois – Trini Kwan [Pilot only]
- Bobby Val – Skull [Pilot only]

== Mighty Morphin Alien Rangers (1996) ==
- Rajia Baroudi – Delphine
- David Bacon – Aurico
- Alan Palmer – Corcus
- Karim Prince – Cestro
- Jim Gray – Tideus
- Michael R. Gotto – Young Tommy Oliver
- Michael J. O'Laskey – Young Rocky DeSantos
- Matthew Sakimoto – Young Adam Park
- Sicily Sewell – Young Aisha Campbell
- Julia Jordan – Young Katherine "Kat" Hillard
- Justin Timsit – Young Billy Cranston
- David Yost – Billy Cranston
- Cody Slaton (deceased) – Young Bulk
- Ross J. Samya – Young Skull

== Power Rangers Zeo (1996) ==
- Catherine Sutherland as Katherine "Kat" Hillard
- Nakia Burrise as Tanya Sloan
- Steve Cardenas as Rocky DeSantos
- Johnny Yong Bosch as Adam Park
- Jason David Frank (deceased) as Tommy Oliver
- Austin St. John as Jason Lee Scott
- David Yost as Billy Cranston
- Erik Frank (deceased) as David Trueheart
- Paul Schrier as Farkas "Bulk" Bulkmeier
- Jason Narvy as Eugene "Skull" Skullovitch
- Richard Genelle (deceased) as Ernie
- Bob Manahan (deceased) – Zordon [voice actor]
- Gregg Bullock – Lt./Det. Jerome Stone
- Ed Neil – Lord Zedd [suit actor]
- Robert Axelrod – Lord Zedd [voice actor]
- Barbara Goodson – Rita Repulsa & Prince Sprocket [voice actor]
- David Stenstrom – King Mondo [voice actor]
- Alex Borstein – Queen Machina [voice actor]
- Kerrigan Mahan – Goldar [voice actor]
- Bob Papenbrook – Rito Revolto [voice actor]
- Brad Hawkins – Trey of Triforia [voice actor]
- Tom, Tim, & Ted DiFilippo – Trey of Triforia

== Power Rangers Turbo (1997) ==
- Jason David Frank (deceased) – Tommy Oliver
- Blake Foster – Justin Stewart
- Johnny Yong Bosch – Adam Park
- Nakia Burrise – Tanya Sloan
- Catherine Sutherland – Katherine "Kat" Hillard
- Selwyn Ward – T.J. Johnson
- Roger Velasco – Carlos Vallerte
- Tracy Lynn Cruz – Ashley Hammond
- Patricia Ja Lee – Cassie Chan
- Carol Hoyt – Divatox [ep. 1–25] and Dimitria
- Hilary Shepard Turner – Divatox [ep. 26–45]
- Paul Schrier – Farkas "Bulk" Bulkmeier
- Jason Narvy – Eugene "Skull" Skullovitch
- Gregg Bullock – Jerome Stone
- Katerina Luciani – Alpha 6 [voice actor]
- Derek Stephen Prince – Elgar [voice actor]
- Lex Lang – Rygog [voice actor]
- Scott Page-Pagter – Porto [voice actor]
- David Walsh – Blue Senturion [voice actor]
- Ali Afshar/Alex Todd – Phantom Ranger [voice actor]

== Power Rangers in Space (1998) ==
- Christopher Khayman Lee – Andros
- Roger Velasco – Carlos Vallerte
- Selwyn Ward – T.J. Johnson
- Tracy Lynn Cruz – Ashley Hammond
- Patricia Ja Lee – Cassie Chan
- Justin Nimmo – Zhane
- Melody Perkins – Astronema / Karone
- Paul Schrier – Farkas "Bulk" Bulkmeier
- Jason Narvy – Eugene "Skull" Skullovitch
- Jack Banning – Professor Phenomenus
- Hilary Shepard Turner – Divatox
- Aloma Wright – Adelle Ferguson
- Wendee Lee – Alpha 6 [voice actor]
- Lex Lang – Ecliptor [voice actor]
- Christopher Cho – Dark Spector [voice actor]
- Steve Kramer – Darkonda [voice actor]

== Power Rangers Lost Galaxy (1999) ==
- Danny Slavin – Leo Corbett
- Reggie Rolle – Damon Henderson
- Archie Kao – Kai Chen
- Cerina Vincent – Maya
- Valerie Vernon – Kendrix Morgan
- Russell Lawrence – Mike Corbett
- Melody Perkins – Karone
- Amy Miller – Trakeena
- Paul Schrier – Farkas "Bulk" Bulkmeier
- Kerrigan Mahan – Magna Defender I [voice actor]
- Wendee Lee – Alpha 6 [voice actor]
- Kim Strauss – Scorpius [voice actor]
- Tom Wyner – Furio [voice actor]
- Derek Stephen Prince – Treacheron [voice actor]
- Bob Papenbrook (deceased) – Deviot [voice actor]
- David Lodge – Villamax [voice actor]
- Richard Cansino – Kegler [voice actor]
- Mike Lee Reynolds (deceased) – Captain Mutiny [voice actor]
- Tom Whyte – Commander Stanton

== Power Rangers Lightspeed Rescue (2000) ==
- Sean Cw Johnson – Carter Grayson
- Michael Chaturantabut – Chad Lee
- Keith Robinson – Joel Rawlings
- Sasha Craig – Kelsey Winslow
- Alison MacInnis – Dana Mitchell
- Rhett Fisher – Ryan Mitchell
- Monica Louwerens – Miss Angela Fairweather
- Ron Roggé – Capt. William Mitchell
- Jennifer L. Yen – Vypra
- Diane Salinger – Queen Bansheera [voice actor]
- Michael Forest – Prince Olympius [voice actor]
- Neil Kaplan – Diabolico [voice actor]
- David Lodge – Loki [voice actor]
- Kim Strauss – Jinxer [voice actor]

== Power Rangers Time Force (2001) ==
- Jason Faunt – Alex Drake / Wes Collins
- Michael Copon – Lucas Kendall
- Kevin Kleinberg – Trip Regis
- Deborah Estelle Phillips – Katie Walker
- Erin Cahill – Jennifer "Jen" Scotts
- Daniel Southworth – Eric Myers
- Vernon Wells – Ransik
- Kate Sheldon – Nadira
- Edward Albert (deceased) – Mr. Albert Collins
- Brianne Siddall – Circuit [voice actor]
- Ken Merckx – Dr. Michael Zaskin
- Eddie Frierson – Frax [voice actor]

== Power Rangers Wild Force (2002) ==
- Ricardo Medina Jr. – Cole Evans
- Alyson Suzanne Kiperman – Taylor Earhardt
- Phillip Jeanmarie – Max Cooper
- Jessica Rey – Alyssa Enrilé
- Jack Guzman – Danny Delgado
- Phillip Andrew – Merrick Baliton
- Ann Marie Crouch – Princess Shayla
- Ilia Volok – Master Org / Viktor Adler
- Sin Wong – Toxica
- Danny Wayne Stallcup – Jindrax [voice actor]
- Charles Gideon Davis – Animus [suit actor & voice actor]
- Ken Merckx – Nayzor [voice actor]
- Ezra Weisz & Barbara Goodson – Mandilok [voice actors]
- Lex Lang – Zen-Aku [voice actor]

== Power Rangers Ninja Storm (2003) ==
- Pua Magasiva (deceased) – Shane Clarke
- Sally Martin – Tori Hanson
- Glenn McMillan – Waldo "Dustin" Brooks
- Adam Tuominen – Hunter Bradley
- Jorgito Vargas, Jr. – Blake Bradley
- Jason Chan – Cameron "Cam" Watanabe
- Grant McFarland (deceased) – Sensei Watanabe / Lothor
- Katrina Devine – Marah
- Katrina Browne – Kapri
- Megan Nicol – Kelly Halloway
- Peter Rowley – Zurgane [voice actor]
- Bruce Hopkins – Choobo [voice actor]
- Michael Hurst – Vexacus [voice actor]
- Craig Parker – Motodrone [voice actor]
- Jeremy Birchall – Shimazu [voice actor]

== Power Rangers Dino Thunder (2004) ==
- James Napier Robertson – Conner McKnight
- Kevin Duhaney – Ethan James
- Emma Lahana – Kira Ford
- Jason David Frank (deceased) – Dr. Tommy Oliver
- Jeffrey Parazzo – Trent Fernandez-Mercer
- Ismay Johnston – Hayley Ziktor
- Miriama Smith – Elsa / Principal Randall
- Latham Gaines – Mesogog / Dr. Anton Mercer
- Katrina Devine – Cassidy Cornell
- Tom Hern – Devin Del Valle
- James Gaylyn – Zeltrax [voice actor]

== Power Rangers S.P.D. (2005) ==
- Brandon Jay McLaren – Jack Landors
- Chris Violette – Schuyler "Sky" Tate
- Matt Austin – Bridge Carson
- Monica May – Elizabeth "Z" Delgado
- Alycia Purrott – Sydney "Syd" Drew
- John Tui – Anubis "Doggie" Cruger
- Michelle Langstone – Dr. Kat Manx
- Kelson Henderson – Boom
- Barnie Duncan – Piggy [voice actor]
- Rene Naufahu – Emperor Gruumm [voice actor]
- Josephine Davison – Morgana
- Olivia James-Baird – Mora
- Jim McLarty – Broodwing [voice actor]
- Paul Norell – Supreme Commander Fowler Birdy [voice actor]
- Tandi Wright – Isinia Cruger [voice actor]
- Beth Allen – Ally Samuels
- Gina Varela – Charlie – A-Squad Red Ranger

== Power Rangers Mystic Force (2006) ==
- Firass Dirani – Nick Russell / Bowen
- Richard Brancatisano – Xander Bly
- Melanie Vallejo – Madison "Maddie" Rocca
- Nic Sampson – Charlie "Chip" Thorn
- Angie Diaz – Vida "V" Rocca
- John Tui – Daggeron
- Peta Rutter (deceased) – Udonna
- Chris Graham – Leanbow
- Antonia Prebble – Clare Langtree / The Gatekeeper / Niella
- Barnie Duncan – Toby Slambrook
- Kelson Henderson – Phineas
- Holly Shanahan – Leelee Primvare
- Geoff Dolan – Koragg the Knight Wolf [voice actor]
- Oliver Driver – Jenji [voice actor]
- John Leigh – Octomus the Master [voice actor]
- Donogh Rees – Necrolai [voice actor]
- Andrew Robertt – Morticon [voice actor]
- Stuart Devine – Imperious [voice actor]

== Power Rangers Operation Overdrive (2007) ==
- James Maclurcan – Mackenzie "Mack" Hartford
- Samuell Benta – Will Aston
- Gareth Yuen – Dax Lo
- Caitlin Murphy – Veronica "Ronny" Robinson
- Rhoda Montemayor – Rose Ortiz
- Dwayne Cameron – Tyzonn
- Rod Lousich – Andrew Hartford
- David Weatherley (deceased) – Spencer & Benglo
- Gerald Urquhart – Flurious [voice actor]
- Kelson Henderson – Norg & Mig [voice actor]
- Ria Vandervis – Miratrix
- Beth Allen – Vella
- Nic Sampson – Sentinel Knight [voice actor]
- Mark Ferguson – Moltor [voice actor]
- Adam Gardiner – Kamdor [voice actor]

== Power Rangers Jungle Fury (2008) ==
- Jason Smith – Casey Rhodes
- Aljin Abella – Theo Martin
- Anna Hutchison – Lily Chilman
- David de Lautour – Robert "RJ" James
- Nikolai Nikolaeff – Dominic "Dom" Hargan
- Sarah Thomson – Fran
- Nathaniel Lees – Master Mao
- Bruce Allpress (deceased) – Master Phant
- Oliver Driver – Master Swoop
- Paul Gittins – Master Fin
- Stig Eldred – Master Rilla
- Andrew Laing – Master Lope
- Michelle Langstone – Master Guin
- Bede Skinner – Jarrod
- Holly Shanahan – Camille
- Geoff Dolan – Dai Shi [voice actor]
- Cameron Rhodes – Carrnisor [voice actor]
- Elisabeth Easther – Jellica [voice actor]
- Derek Judge – Grizzaka [voice actor]
- Kelson Henderson – Flit [voice actor]

== Power Rangers RPM (2009) ==
- Eka Darville – Scott Truman
- Ari Boyland – Flynn McAllistair
- Rose McIver – Summer Landsdown
- Milo Cawthorne – Ziggy Grover
- Daniel Ewing – Dillon
- Mike Ginn – Gem
- Li Ming Hu – Gemma
- James Gaylyn – Colonel Mason Truman
- Olivia Tennet – Dr. K
- Adelaide Kane – Tenaya 7/15
- Andrew Liang – Venjix Virus [voice actor]
- Charlie McDermott – General Crunch [voice actor]
- Mark Mitchinson – General Shifter [voice actor]
- Leighton Cardno – General Kilobyte [voice actor]

== Power Rangers Samurai & Super Samurai (2011–2012) ==
- Alex Heartman – Jayden Shiba
- Erika Fong – Mia Watanabe
- Hector David Jr. – Mike Fernandez
- Najee De-Tiege – Kevin Douglas
- Brittany Anne Pirtle – Emily Stewart
- Steven Skyler – Antonio Garcia
- Kimberley Crossman – Lauren Shiba
- Felix Ryan – Spike Skullovitch
- Rene Naufahu – Mentor Ji
- Paul Schrier – Farkas "Bulk" Bulkmeier
- Jeff Szusterman – Master Xandred & Octoroo [voice actor]
- Kate Elliott – Dayu [voice actor]
- Ricardo Medina Jr. "Rick Medina" – Deker
- Derek Judge – Serrator [voice actor]

== Power Rangers Megaforce & Super Megaforce (2013–2014) ==
- Andrew Gray – Troy Burrows
- Ciara Hanna – Gia Moran
- John Mark Loudermilk – Noah Carver
- Christina Masterson – Emma Goodall
- Azim Rizk – Jake Holling
- Cameron Jebo – Orion
- Ian Harcourt – Mr. Burley
- Shailesh Prajapati – Ernie
- Chris Auer – Robo Knight [voice actor]
- Geoff Dolan – Gosei [voice actor]
- Estevez Gillespie – Tensou [voice actor]
- Jason Hood – Vrak [voice actor]
- Stephen Butterworth – Prince Vekar [voice actor]
- Campbell Cooley – Admiral Malkor [voice actor]
- Mark Mitchinson – Creepox [voice actor]
- Rebecca Parr – Levira [voice actor]
- John Leigh – Damaras [voice actor]
- Mark Wright – Argus [voice actor]

== Power Rangers Dino Charge & Dino Super Charge (2015–2016) ==
- Brennan Mejia – Tyler Navarro
- James Davies – Chase Randall
- Yoshi Sudarso – Koda
- Michael Taber – Riley Griffin
- Camille Hyde – Shelby Watkins
- Davi Santos – Sir Ivan of Zandar
- Reuben Turner – James Navarro & Dan Musgrove (voice)
- Jarred Blakiston – Prince Philip III
- Claire Blackwelder – Kendall Morgan
- Alistair Browning (deceased) – Zenowing [voice actor]
- Eve Gordon – Keeper [suit actor]
- Richard Simpson – Keeper [voice actor]
- Paul Harrop – Fury [voice actor]
- Adam Gardiner – Sledge [voice actor]
- Estevez Gillespie – Wrench & Curio [voice actor]
- Jackie Clarke – Poisandra [voice actor]
- Ryan Carter – Heckyl
- Campbell Cooley – Snide [voice actor]
- Andy Grainger – Lord Arcanon [voice actor]
- Mark Mitchinson – Singe [voice actor]

== Power Rangers Ninja Steel & Super Ninja Steel (2017–2018) ==
- William Shewfelt – Brody Romero
- Peter Sudarso – Preston Tien
- Nico Greetham – Calvin Maxwell
- Zoë Robins – Hayley Foster
- Chrystiane Lopes – Sarah Thompson
- Jordi Webber – Levi Weston / Aiden Romero
- Byron Coll – Redbot [voice actor]
- Caleb Bendit – Monty
- Chris Reid – Victor Vincent
- Kelson Henderson – Mick Kanic
- Richard Simpson – Galvanax [voice actor]
- Jacque Drew – Madame Odius [voice actor]
- Campbell Cooley – Cosmo Royale & Ripcon [voice actor]
- Marissa Stott – Badonna [voice actor]
- Amanda Billing – Principal Hastings
- Claire Chitham – Mrs. Finch

== Power Rangers Beast Morphers (2019–2020) ==
- Rorrie D. Travis – Devon Daniels
- Jasmeet Baduwalia – Ravi Shaw
- Jacqueline Scislowski – Zoey Reeves
- Abraham Rodriguez – Nate Silva
- Jamie Linehan – Steel [voice actor]
- Sam Jellie – Steel Silva (Human Form)
- Colby Strong – Blaze
- Liana Ramirez – Roxy
- Cosme Flores – Ben Burke
- Kristina Ho – Betty Burke
- Teuila Blakely – Commander Shaw
- Andrew Laing – Evox/Venjix [voice actor]
- Campbell Cooley – Scrozzle [voice actor]
- Kelson Henderson – Cruise [voice actor]
- Charlie McDermott – Smash [voice actor]
- Emmett Skilton – Jax [voice actor]
- Kevin Copeland – Mayor Adam Daniels
- Mark Wright – General Burke

== Power Rangers Dino Fury (2021–2022) ==
- Russell Curry – Zayto
- Hunter Deno – Amelia Jones
- Kai Moya – Ollie Akana
- Tessa Rao – Isabella "Izzy" Garcia
- Chance Perez – Javier "Javi" Garcia
- Jordon Fite – Aiyon
- Shavaughn Ruakere – Dr. Lani Akana
- Blair Strang – Warden Carlos Garcia Buzzkill
- Josephine Davison – Solon [voice actress]
- Kira Josephson – Jane/Tombtress
- Victoria Abbott – J-Borg
- Benny Joy Smith – Annie
- Noah Paul – Stan
- Mayhen Meta – Astronomer
- Darien Takle – Madame Indigo
- Greg Johnson – Ed "Pop-Pop" Jones
- Jared Turner – Tarrick/Void Knight
- Torum Heng – Mucus [voice actress]
- Mark Mitchinson – Boomtower [voice actor]
- Siobhan Marshall – Santaura/Void Queen
- Campbell Cooley – Slyther [voice actor]
- Jacqueline Joe – Fern
- Kelson Henderson – Mick Kanic

== Power Rangers Cosmic Fury (2023) ==
- Russell Curry – Zayto Zordon
- Hunter Deno – Amelia Jones
- Kai Moya – Ollie Akana
- Tessa Rao – Isabella "Izzy" Garcia
- Chance Perez – Javier "Javi" Garcia
- Jordon Fite – Aiyon
- Jacqueline Joe – Fern
- David Yost – Billy Cranston
- Kelson Henderson – Mick Kanic
- Ryan Carter – Heckyl
- Shavaughn Ruakere – Dr. Lani Akana
- Blair Strang – Warden Carlos Garcia BuzzKill
- Josephine Davison – Solon [voice actress]
- Kira Josephson – Jane
- Victoria Abbott – J-Borg
- Torum Heng – Mucus [voice actress]
- Campbell Cooley – Slyther [voice actor]
- Jared Turner – Tarrick
- Fred Tatasciore – Lord Zedd [voice actor]
- Amanda Billing – Bajillia Naire [voice actor]
- Brooke Williams – Squillia Naire [voice actor]
- Chris Howden –Inkworth [voice actor]
- Campbell Cooley – Scrozzle [voice actor]
