= List of Mighty Morphin Power Rangers characters =

This is a list of characters in the Power Rangers franchise's inaugural season Mighty Morphin Power Rangers, its theatrical adaptation Mighty Morphin Power Rangers: The Movie, and the anniversary special Mighty Morphin Power Rangers: Once & Always.

For the purposes of this article, the miniseries Mighty Morphin Alien Rangers is considered to be a part of the third season of Mighty Morphin Power Rangers. While villains from the film Mighty Morphin Power Rangers: The Movie are covered in this page, they are not considered part of Power Rangers television continuity.

== Power Rangers ==
=== Jason Lee Scott ===
Jason Lee Scott is the original Red Ranger; also the team's original leader.

As the Red Ranger, he has controlled the Tyrannosaurus Dinozord and the Red Dragon Thunderzord. His main weapon was the Power Sword as well as a blaster which converted into a blade.

He was portrayed by Austin St. John.

=== Zack Taylor ===
Zachary "Zack" Taylor is the original Black Ranger.

As the Black Ranger, he has controlled the Mastodon Dinozord and the Lion Thunderzord. His main weapon was the Power Axe, which converted to a "shot gun" style blaster, as well as a holstered blaster, which converted to a blade.

He was portrayed by Walter Emanuel Jones.

=== Kimberly Hart ===
Kimberly Hart is the original Pink Ranger and the original Pink Ninja Ranger.

As the Pink Ranger, she has controlled the Pterodactyl Dinozord, the Firebird Thunderzord, and the Crane Ninjazord. Her main weapon was the Power Bow as well as a blaster, which converted to a blade.

She was portrayed by Amy Jo Johnson.

=== Billy Cranston ===
Billy Cranston is the Blue Ranger and the Blue Ninja Ranger and also is the longest-lasting member of the original team. He effectively acts as the team leader in the Alien Rangers series being the only one to regain his true age.

As the Blue Ranger, he has controlled the Triceratops Dinozord, the Unicorn Thunderzord, the Wolf Ninjazord, and the wolf-headed Blue Shogunzord. His main weapon was the Power Lance, which split into two pieces, as well as a blaster, which converted into a blade.

He was portrayed by David Yost.

=== Trini Kwan ===
Trini Kwan is the first Yellow Ranger.

As the Yellow Ranger, she has controlled the Sabertooth Tiger Dinozord and the Griffin Thunderzord. Her main weapons were the Power Daggers as well as a blaster, which converted to a blade.

She was portrayed by Thuy Trang.

=== Tommy Oliver ===
Thomas "Tommy" Oliver is the Green Ranger and later the White Ranger and the White Ninja Ranger; also the team's second leader.

As the Green Ranger, he controlled the Dragon Zord. As the White Ranger, he controlled the White tiger Zord, the Falcon Zord and the bird-like White Shogunzord. His main weapon was the Dragon Dagger while serving as the Green Ranger and Saba whilst serving as the White Ranger.

He was portrayed by Jason David Frank.

=== Rocky DeSantos ===
Rocky DeSantos is the second Red Ranger and the Red Ninja Ranger, succeeding Jason Lee Scott.

When he became the Red Ranger, he gained control of the Red Dragon Thunderzord, the Ape Ninjazord, the ape-like Red Shogunzord and controlled the Tyrannosaurus Dinozord.

He was portrayed by Steve Cardenas.

=== Adam Park ===
Adam Park is the second Black Ranger and the Black Ninja Ranger, succeeding Zack Taylor.

When he became the Black Ranger, he gained control of the Lion Thunderzord and later controlled the Frog Ninjazord and the frog-headed Black Shogunzord. He later played the Green Ranger in Power Rangers Zeo and Power Rangers Turbo. He reprised his role as the Black Mighty Morphin Ranger in one episode of Power Rangers in Space (1998) and Power Rangers Operation Overdrive (2007). Either he or Zack would return as the Black Mighty Morphin Ranger in Power Rangers Beast Morphers, as they stay morphed throughout the episode "Grid Connection".

He was portrayed by Johnny Yong Bosch.

=== Aisha Campbell ===
Aisha Campbell is the second Yellow Ranger and the Yellow Ninja Ranger, succeeding Trini Kwan.

When she became the Yellow Ranger, she gained control of the Griffin Thunderzord and later controlled the Bear Ninjazord and the bear-headed Yellow Shogunzord. Aisha was going to remain normal size in a potential three-part episode "Zordon, I Shrunk the Rangers" and be sent back to the Command Center. She was supposed to do battle with Scorpina whom the latter has a bitter grudge against and holds her off as Alpha 5 tries to grow the other Rangers held captive by Goldar.

She was portrayed by Karan Ashley.

=== Katherine "Kat" Hillard ===
Katherine "Kat" Hillard is the second Pink Ranger and the second Pink Ninja Ranger, succeeding Kimberly Hart.

When she became the Pink Ranger, she gained control of the Crane Ninjazord, was Tommy's co-pilot for the White Shogunzord, and controlled the Pterodactyl Dinozord. She marries Tommy and has a son, JJ Oliver, who eventually becomes SPD Green Ranger

She was portrayed by Catherine Sutherland.

=== Minh Kwan ===
Minh Kwan is the third Yellow Ranger, introduced in Mighty Morphin Power Rangers: Once & Always.

When she became the Yellow Ranger, she controlled the Sabertooth Tiger Dinozord. Her main weapons were the Power Daggers as well as her Blade Blaster.

She was portrayed by Charlize "Charlie" Kersh.

== Allies ==
=== Zordon ===
Zordon is an inter-dimensional being trapped in a time warp. He acts as the wise mentor of the Rangers, who also bestowed their powers. 10,000 years prior to the show's beginning, Zordon led the fight against the forces of evil. He was able to imprison Rita and her minions in a dumpster on the moon. He once had a corporeal human form, but appears as a floating head in an energy tube to the Power Rangers.

He was initially voiced and portrayed by David Fielding and later voiced by Robert L. Manahan. In Mighty Morphin Power Rangers: Rita's Rewind, Zordon is voiced by A.J. LoCascio.

=== Alpha 5 ===
Alpha 5 is a multi-functional sentient android from Edenoi who serves as Zordon's trusted robotic assistant, responsible for the daily operations and upkeep of the Command Center.

He was voiced by Richard Steven Horvitz in the TV series and by A.J. LoCascio in Mighty Morphin Power Rangers: Rita's Rewind.

=== Prince Dex ===
Prince Dex/Masked Rider is a warrior from Alpha's home planet of Edenoi who leads a resistance movement against its ruthless dictator Count Dregon, an acquaintance and rival of Lord Zedd who is also Dex's uncle.

He was portrayed by Ted Jan Roberts.

=== Ninjor ===
Ninjor is the creator of the original 5 Power Coins and Dinozords that were used by the original 5 Power Rangers, even though it was Zordon who distributed them.

He was portrayed by Hideaki Kusaka and voiced by Kim Strauss.

=== Wild West Rangers ===
The Wild West Rangers are the Old West ancestors of Rocky, Adam, Aisha and Billy. Named Rocko, Abraham, Miss Alicia and William. They temporarily obtain Ranger Powers when Kimberly is transported to their time to fight off Goldar and Needlenose.

As Rangers, the Wild West Rangers have outfits identical to those of their descendants with the exception of the addition of cowboy attire.

=== White Stranger ===
The White Stranger is an Old West ancestor of Tommy. He fights crime in a way that is similar to the Lone Ranger.

== Angel Grove inhabitants ==
=== Bulk and Skull ===
Farkas "Bulk" Bulkmeier and Eugene "Skull" Skullovitch are two bullies at Angel Grove High School. Bulk, the leader of the duo, was prone to dragging Skull into wacky schemes which usually failed and ended in humiliation or injury.

In the second season, the two decide to discover the identities of the Power Rangers after they were saved by the Rangers in "The Mutiny".

In the third season, they enroll in the Junior Police Force. Thanks to the efforts of their superior officer, Lt. Stone, the duo become good-natured goofs.

Bulk was portrayed by Paul Schrier and Skull was portrayed by Jason Narvy.

=== Ernie ===
Ernie is the owner and proprietor of the Youth Center; he could often be seen behind the counter of the Juice Bar and would sometimes dispense advice to the teens. Ernie was known to be annoyed by Bulk and Skull. In one episode, he banned them from returning to the Youth Center until they've paid for the cake ruined when they skateboarded recklessly in the center.

He was portrayed by Richard Genelle.

=== Mr. Caplan ===
Mr. Caplan is the stern principal of Angel Grove High School, who often encouraged his students in their extracurricular activities. He wore a toupée, which serves as a common running gag during seasons 1 and 2, as it would be knocked off by different things. He was often annoyed by Bulk and Skull's antics and would put the duo in detention.

He was portrayed by Harold Cannon (uncredited).

=== Ms. Appleby ===
Ms. Appleby is a teacher at Angel Grove High School.

She was portrayed by Royce Herron (uncredited).

=== Angela ===
Angela is the girl of Zack's affections; he was constantly attempting to impress and go out on a date with her, much to her annoyance. She would often demean Zack for his attempts.

She only appears in season 1 and was portrayed by Renee Griggs (uncredited).

=== Curtis ===
Curtis is Zack's cousin who appears very early on in season 2; he was phased out of the show shortly after Zack's departure.

He was portrayed by Joel Rodgers (uncredited).

=== Richie ===
Richie is another teen introduced early in season 2 to aid Ernie with running the juice bar and who was planned to be Trini's love interest. He was phased out of the show following Trini's departure.

He was portrayed by Maurice Mendoza (uncredited).

=== Lieutenant Jerome Stone ===
Jerome Stone is a police lieutenant with the Angel Grove Police Department who is assigned to oversee Bulk and Skull. He fills Ernie's role for the duration of Turbo. After the Rangers become Space Rangers, they are no longer shown spending time at the Youth Center. The Surf Spot becomes their new hangout spot and Lt. Stone was never mentioned again.

He was portrayed by Gregg Bullock.

== Villains ==
=== Rita Repulsa ===
Rita Repulsa was the primary antagonist for the first 60 episodes of the series. She was relegated to the position of secondary antagonist after the changing of the Zords. She is a witch who is the daughter of the first demonic overlord of the M51 Galaxy, Master Vile. Her brother Rito is a bumbler, and completely incompetent. She married Lord Zedd with whom she also had a child named Thrax.

In Turbo: A Power Rangers Movie (1997), Divatox contacts Rita for advice on how to defeat the Power Rangers, but Rita retorts that if she had known how to do that she would not be in her current predicament, and she holds the phone up to Lord Zedd's face, who is heavily snoring in his sleep. In Power Rangers in Space, their relationship is more hostile. Before and after Dark Specter turns up to the meeting, the two act like teenagers as they fight for his attention, only to both get snubbed in favour of his disciple Astronema.

Rita Repulsa was played by Machiko Soga in Zyuranger footage; Carla Perez in U.S. footage; and Sydney native Julia Cortez in Mighty Morphin Power Rangers: The Movie (1995). All her Power Rangers appearances are voiced by Barbara Goodson, who overdubs the actresses' lip movements with the screechy voice that is among Rita's trademark characteristics. In Mighty Morphin Power Rangers: Rita's Rewind, Rita is voiced by Ally Dixon.

=== Goldar ===
Goldar is a manticore-themed knight who serves as Rita Repulsa and Lord Zedd's right-hand man. In season one, he is a considerably more competent fighter, who is shown fighting alongside Scorpina. From season 2 onwards, he is depicted as considerably less capable, gradually transitioning to comic relief. During season 1, Goldar frequently does battle with the Megazord, usually if the episode's monster or device had already been dispatched by the Rangers.

When Lord Zedd arrives on the Moon, Goldar eagerly abandons Rita for Zedd, regaining his wings in the process. As Zedd's right-hand man, Goldar leads many missions for him. When Rita returns to the moon and marries Zedd, Goldar is forced to serve her once again alongside Zedd. He was reduced into sand by Zordon's Energy Wave in Power Rangers in Space.

In both the series and the film, he is voiced by Kerrigan Mahan. In Mighty Morphin Power Rangers: The Movie, his suit actor is Kerry Casey. In Mighty Morphin Power Rangers: Rita's Rewind, Goldar is voiced by James Willems.

Goldar appears as a secondary antagonist in the 2017 movie reboot with his vocal effects provided by Fred Tatasciore.

Goldar Maximus, a new iteration of Goldar resurrected by Scrozzle and Evox, returns in season 2 of Power Rangers Beast Morphers before being destroyed once again.

=== Squatt and Baboo ===
Squatt is a servant of Lord Zedd and Rita Repulsa, the dimwitted sidekick of Baboo. Squatt is a short, blue-skinned hobgoblin-like creature with a large horn. He wears metal armor. Squatt is rather excitable and may act like an eager child when Rita has a plan or when the Rangers are having trouble in a battle. Squatt is easily frightened by his bosses' bad tempers. He is a coward, and rather than fight, he and Baboo often accompany Goldar, Scorpina, and monsters as they attack the Earth, cheering them on. However, he often goes to Earth when there is no fight going on, because his main duties are acting as a spy and saboteur, as shown in episodes like "Switching Places", "Foul Play in the Sky", "Calamity Kimberly", and "Rita's Seed of Evil". Squatt's birthplace is given as Myrgo, Venus.

Baboo is the more intelligent of a dimwitted duo consisting of him and Squatt. He is a tall, slim, black vampire that resembles a cross between a monkey and a vampire bat with crippled wings. Like Finster, he mainly works behind the lines. Though spineless and scatterbrained, he is highly creative. He serves as Rita's alchemist and potion maker, creating substances and devices for her to use. Notable creations include a time device, a punk potion, the monster Shellshock, and the Knasty Knight's sword. Baboo is rarely confident in his mistress' plans, but would never say this to her face. Like Squatt, he is somewhat cowardly, often going to Earth to scheme or cheer on Goldar and/or Scorpina in battle rather than taking part in a fight himself. Both Squatt and Baboo have a relationship with Scorpina reminiscent of a mean older sister bullying her younger brothers. Baboo had a great fear of Scorpina saying he remembered the terrible things she did. He asks Rita to keep her stinger away from him; Squatt recalls that Scorpina stung Baboo on the head and he complained for a week. Baboo's birthplace was given as the Planet of the Pongies.

When Lord Zedd took over as the main villain in the second season, Squatt and Baboo's roles were greatly reduced. Though still living in the palace, they mainly watch events in the throne room from behind a wall and offer occasional comments. Both participate in Zedd and Rita's wedding. They were later put back to work as saboteurs after Rita's return. In the third season, they are pure comic relief and occasionally are paired with Rito Revolto in schemes Rita involves them in.

Squatt and Baboo disappear during the Power Rangers Zeo series, when fleeing from the Machine Empire with their masters.

In Power Rangers in Space, Squatt was seen in "Countdown to Destruction" with Rita and Zedd's army.

Squatt was voiced by Michael Sorich and his suit actor is Minoru Watanabe.

Baboo was voiced by Colin Philips and his suit actor was portrayed by Hideaki Kusaka (uncredited in season 1), Steve Andreno in Seasons 1–3, and later by Jason Ybarra in Seasons 3-Zeo.

=== Finster ===
Finster is a shy leprechaun/terrier-themed henchman of Rita Repulsa and Lord Zedd, though mostly the former. Finster's birthplace was given as the distant planet Claydoious.

During the first season of Mighty Morphin Power Rangers, he is primarily responsible for creating a new monster to battle the Power Rangers in each episode, as well as producing a regular supply of Putty Patrollers, although this function falls to Lord Zedd after his appearance. Finster does this by sculpting the monsters out of clay and "cooking" them in a special oven/kiln/machine called the Monstermatic in his workshop. Not only is he skilled at supplying monsters and henchmen for his leaders, he is also shown to be a skilled alchemist and potion maker (similar to Baboo) and inventor supplying many kinds of potions and gadgets. He is also extremely brilliant and somewhat all-knowing, as he is also able to provide wisdom for Rita and Zedd. Near the end of the episode "Crystal of Nightmares", it is implied by Goldar that Finster thought using the Crystal is a good idea, while Goldar denies it (calling him an "overgrown rat" in the process). He is the one responsible for making the suggestion that Alpha 5 be used in "delivering the message of evil", as Rita Repulsa had called it, in "The Wedding".

When Lord Zedd takes over as the main villain in Season 2, Finster is suddenly made obsolete. Zedd makes his own monsters, though after Pirantishead (Zedd's first monster) is destroyed, Finster comments that he could have done better with the monsters he could have created for Zedd. Finster laments his current status among the villains, missing the time when Rita was in charge. When Rita returns from her exile, Finster helps her return to power – restoring her size, making her look younger and creating a love potion to get Zedd to marry her so she can manipulate him before destroying him as revenge for casting her away in space. He quickly noticed the love potion he created had some side effects, when Rita had a hard time trying to manipulate Zedd as he devoted his time with her (as well as Rita inadvertently falling in love with Zedd as well).

In the third season and the Mighty Morphin' Alien Rangers mini-series, Finster returns to making monsters. His love potion is first accidentally revealed to Rito and eventually Goldar learns the truth. He forces Finster to make the antidote for Zedd. Though the antidote worked, he is just as surprised as anyone to find, though, that Zedd actually did love Rita.

At the start of Power Rangers Zeo season, Finster joins Zedd and Rita in fleeing the oncoming forces of the Machine Empire. He later returns with his masters and builds several machines for them. In "Rangers of Two Worlds, Part 1", Finster makes a new staff for Rita, which is absurdly more powerful than the previous one, as it creates a monster that is too strong even for the Zeo Ultrazord. He also builds a bomb for Zedd's plan against the Machine Empire's leaders and Zedd successfully defeats them with it, proving to the machines that Zedd's party is their equal.

While working for Rita and Zedd, Finster is never really an evil character, but rather an artist. He even says in part of Alien Rangers of Aquatar Pt. 1 at one point "Sometimes I really hate being a bad guy."

In Power Rangers in Space, Finster was seen in "Countdown to Destruction" as part of Rita and Zedd's army.

In the graphic novel Power Rangers: Soul of the Dragon, Finster was shown to be purified. He was later killed by Scorpina and left a pre-recorded message in a sculpture of him for Tommy.

Finster was voiced by Robert Axelrod.

=== Scorpina ===
Scorpina is a human/scorpion hybrid and is one of Rita Repulsa's most ruthless and dangerous minions aside from Goldar. Though the Scorpina/Goldar relationship in Mighty Morphin Power Rangers is significantly less developed than the Grifforzer/Lamie relationship of its Japanese counterpart, Goldar and Scorpina have shown affection toward each other where Goldar is shown to be protective of her. She has a human form (a beautiful Asian woman with long black hair wearing a somewhat tight golden scorpion armor), but has a hideous scorpion monster form when Rita makes her gigantic. Like Goldar, she often engages in giant battles with the Zords if the monster or device was already destroyed by the small rangers.

Very little is actually known about Scorpina. Her first appearance was in the "Green with Evil" story arc. She is an old friend of Rita Repulsa. Both Squatt and Baboo have a relationship with Scorpina reminiscent of a mean older sister bullying her younger brothers. Baboo had a great fear of Scorpina saying he remembered the terrible things she did. He asks Rita to keep her stinger away from him; Squatt recalls that Scorpina stung Baboo on the head and he complained for a week. Much like Goldar, she would often square off against Jason when sent to battle the Rangers and overpowered them with relative ease. Scorpina has a boomerang-like sword she used to attack the Rangers with. When in giant form, she loses any human appearance and often fights alongside Goldar. Scorpina once used her pet silkworm to fight the Power Rangers. Her personality is very cold and calculating compared to most season one villains, although she has moments of being less serious than Goldar, but despite that is seen almost always smiling (at least in her human form), even in battle. She also created a monster called the Rockstar.

In "The Mutiny, Part 1" at the start of the second season, Scorpina is seen among Rita's group. When Lord Zedd arrives and causes the palace to shake, Scorpina is seen going to help Rita who has just fallen to the ground. She then disappears after Zedd punished Rita for her failure by shrinking her and casting her away in a space dumpster. She later resurfaces in "Goldar's Vice Versa" as a favor for Goldar. Scorpina has one chance to defeat the Rangers by Lord Zedd. To accomplish this, she poses as a human girl named Sabrina to try to ensnare Adam Park and turn him against his friends. This failed and Scorpina found a rivalry in Aisha Campbell, who suspected her from the start due to her rudeness with her and the other rangers. Revealing herself as Scorpina, she was forced to take both of them hostage, though the other Rangers arrived in time to save them. She and Goldar grow to giant-size but soon retreat after being overwhelmed by the new and improved Thunder Zords.

This was her last appearance. She was absent during the "Countdown to Destruction" finale of Power Rangers in Space, in which the majority of the series' surviving villains were either purified into human form or reduced to dust. An early concept for the series that became Power Rangers Ninja Storm would have featured Scorpina and other absent villains returning and menacing Earth.

In the graphic novel Power Rangers: Soul of the Dragon, it was revealed that Scorpina got delusioned with Rita failing to conquer Earth. She got sent to the Talos Dimension by Rita after she caught her with one of her spellbooks. While there, Scorpina has tried to get Lokar to send her back to Earth. He only relented when Rita was discovered to have been purified by Zordon's energy wave. Gathering some underlings, Scorpina abducted Tommy Oliver's son in order to sacrifice him to Lokar. She even killed Finster at one point. When Tommy and the Power Rangers defeated Scorpina in her giant scorpion monster form, she was sucked back into the Talos Dimension by Lokar along with some of her underlings when Lokar got tired of waiting.

Scorpina was portrayed by Ami Kawai in Zyuranger footage and was voiced by Wendee Swan. The American actress who later portrayed her in "Goldar's Vice-Versa" was Sabrina Lu.

Scorpina was said to appear in the 2017 film as the main antagonist, along with Goldar. The concept was scrapped as Rita Repulsa (Elizabeth Banks) would be the film's antagonist. Elements of Scorpina's appearance in the show were incorporated into Rita's costume, such as her armor.

=== Lokar ===
Appearing as a floating demonic, ethereal, blue head, the powerful Lokar changes Mutitus to his more powerful form and assists in sending the Power Rangers to the Island of Illusions. He is an old friend of Rita's and she called on him for a favor to defeat the Rangers. After destroying Mutitus, the Power Rangers attack Lokar with the Ultrazord, but he manages to escape by teleporting away just after the blast hits him. When Kimberly states that Lokar got away, the other Rangers groan as Jason says "We'll get him next time".

Lokar is later summoned again when Goldar goes into battle with his extremely powerful War Zord, Cyclopsis ("Doomsday, Parts 1 & 2"). Lokar, heavily scarred from the Ultrazord attack, recreates the War Zord when it falls to the Power Rangers' attack and then aids Cyclopsis in its next two battles against the Power Rangers, but disappears forever when Cyclopsis is destroyed by the Ultrazord.

In the graphic novel Power Rangers: Soul of the Dragon, Lokar is revealed to reside in the Talos Dimension where his true body is shown. He ceased aiding Rita after the destruction of Cyclopsis and became an isolationist. When Scorpina was sent to the Talos Dimension by Rita, she had tried to get Lokar to send her back to Earth at different points to no avail. Lokar only relented years later when he learns that Rita and any other ally of his was purified by Zordon's energy wave and returned to Earth where it was eight years since the Troobian Empire was defeated. She was instructed to sacrifice Tommy's son J.J. while using the powers of the crystals that she was told to obtain that will help Lokar conquer Earth. After Tommy thwarted Scorpina's attempt to sacrifice J.J., Lokar got tired of waiting for Scorpina to complete her mission and projected his head on Earth. When Scorpina says she needs a moment to complete her mission, Lokar rants on how hard it is to "commute" from the Talos Dimension and sucked Scorpina and some of his underlings back to the Talos Dimension while stating that he will have his tribute one way or another.

In Power Rangers Dino Fury, Lokar had a nephew named Lothorn who worked with Lord Zedd.

Lokar was portrayed by Masahiko Urano and voiced by Robert Axelrod.

=== Lord Zedd ===
Lord Zedd is an intergalactic warlord who was the primary antagonist for the first 40 episodes of the second season and co-antagonist for the rest of season 2 and all of season 3. When he first appeared in the second season of Mighty Morphin Power Rangers, Zedd proclaimed himself "the emperor of all that is evil" and was revealed to be Rita's superior, a fact that surprised the Rangers when they learned of his existence and position in the galaxy at large. Zedd was shown to be furious with Rita's constant failures for being defeated by what he termed 'mere infants' and 'children'. Despite knowing that Zordon was still alive, he was determined to conquer Earth and destroy the Rangers himself. For Rita's repeated failures, Zedd has her punished by shrinking her and sealing her away in a space dumpster to travel for eternity. Despite his early defeats, Zedd's attack on Earth became progressively more violent and focused most of his attention on eliminating Tommy, whom he saw as Rita's biggest mistake. He succeeded in eliminating the Green Ranger powers with the help of a green crystal that serves to drain Tommy's powers as well as serving to power up his own brand of evil rangers. After both the crystal and Turbanshell were destroyed, he finally succeeded in depriving Tommy of the remaining power that the Green Ranger had left, rendering him powerless for a time until he became the White Ranger.

Eventually, Zedd realizes the warning Rita had given him was true and he was having the same difficulties in defeating the Rangers as she had experienced. In retaliation, he brought forth his personal Zord, a colossal serpentine dragon-esque machine named Serpentera. Despite the large Zord's advantage against the Thunder Zords, its intense energy needs prevented it from destroying them or the Rangers, which infuriated Zedd to no end. Zedd attempted to find an infinite power source for Serpentera over the course of the series to no avail. During this time, Zedd revealed that he and Zordon somehow 'maintained' the existence of the Morphin Grid, and were opposite ends of its energy spectrum. However Zedd occasionally required a period of rest in order to refresh his powers, a process which would take roughly a century of rest to properly bring him back to his full strength. Zedd's Centennial Energy Recharge, set to take place during the Rangers' lifetime, left him vulnerable to Rita when she made a secret return to the moon, where she set about attempting to use a love potion to gain control over Zedd as revenge for her banishment. Upon awakening under the love potion, Zedd immediately fell in love with Rita much to her delight, and proposed to her. However, the love potion did not work as Rita hoped; she planned to turn Zedd sycophantic to her under the potion, but somehow, he remains in control and attempted to dominate over Rita as a commanding husband. He even wants Rita to produce heirs for him, much to her hysterical outrage and leading her to order Finster to work on an antidote. After their wedding, they often bickered with each other when failing to overcome one another but remained together. Zedd became less serious about defeating the Rangers and more focused on his life with Rita, while Rita remains determined to defeat them with Zedd's aid. In time, Rita was unknowingly falling in love with Zedd too and accepts her status as his wife and co-leader to their minions.

With Zedd and Rita side by side, the Rangers' battles were more difficult. Zedd and Rita's schemes together included creating a mind controlled clone of Tommy who was armed with a fully functioning Green Power Coin and Morpher and sending the Rangers back into the past. Zedd was also revealed to have had a rivalry with another cosmic villain named Count Dregon. When his wife's brother Rito Revolto arrived on the moon (bringing the Tengu warriors and a Vampirus as wedding gifts) Lord Zedd was disgusted by the skeleton's stupidity and would bellow with rage every time Rito called him "Ed". Rita's love potion was eventually removed from Zedd after Goldar used the antidote on him. However, to everyone's surprise, Zedd loved Rita on his own; his devotion to his wife was genuine.

When Rita and Rito's father, Master Vile, arrived on the moon, Lord Zedd was pushed to the side as Vile took over in his search for the Zeo Crystal. Rita said an attempt to claim the Zeo Crystal was responsible for Zedd's face, and he told her the force field protecting it was nothing to joke about. Vile ignored this and simply pushed on with his own quest for the crystal. Lord Zedd expressed disdain for his father-in-law, who constantly put him down. Once Vile left after his army was defeated by the Aquitian Rangers, Zedd was ecstatic, and he resumed his attacks on Earth. The Rangers had been turned to children due to Vile's Orb of Doom and all that stood in Zedd's way were the Aquitian Rangers. Zedd managed to find a map of the Rangers' Command Center, pointing out a weak point. He sent Goldar and Rito in to plant a bomb and steal the Zeo Crystal before the Orb of Doom's magic was undone. Though unable to stop the rangers in undoing the damage Master Vile did, Zedd was able to destroy the Command Center. But before they could take advantage of it, the Machine Empire arrived and attacked. Zedd and Rita were forced to retreat, taking Serpentera to the M51 Galaxy where they would stay with Master Vile, to Zedd's dismay. They soon returned, however, in a motorhome, plotting to overthrow King Mondo and destroy the Empire. The two forces clashed on several occasions, neither gaining much ground. At one point, Prince Gasket had Tommy brainwashed and closed a dimensional portal to his arena to prevent the Rangers (Minus Jason, who was at the arena) from saving him, but Zedd had Finster help get the rangers to the arena to prevent a Machine victory. After a series of failed attempts, they finally managed to destroy the Royal House of Gadgetry with a bomb in the shape of a gift.

Lord Zedd, along with Rita, makes a cameo appearance in Turbo: A Power Rangers Movie, when Divatox calls Rita for advice on how to deal with the Power Rangers; Rita asks Divatox if she would allow herself to be subjected to Zedd's snoring if she knew how to defeat the Rangers, advising the other villain to flee, rather than fight. After many successive failures, this was the best advice the villainess could get.

A year later, Zedd and Rita attended Dark Specter's conference on the Cimmerian Planet, Zedd toasting to Dark Specter's capture of Zordon and takeover of the universe and unsuccessfully tried to attack Andros when he was caught spying. Months later, they invaded the Vica Galaxy and quickly conquered it, defeating and capturing the Gold Ranger in the process. When Zordon's energy wave washed over them and their army, Zedd was spared, transformed into a human being. His love for Rita seemed to remain and the two danced together in the remnants of their army, much to the confusion and relief of the Gold Ranger.

Nine years later in Power Rangers Operation Overdrive, Rita and Zedd's son Thrax mentions that he seeks to rebuild his parents' legacy, disgusted by the fact that they were "lost to goodness". Thrax is vanquished by the Sentinel Knight with Excelsior's sword.

In Power Rangers Beast Morphers, Lord Zedd's staff is one of the many villain relics in Ryjack's collection that is acquired by Evox and his minions. Evox plans to revive and gather the most notorious villains in the universe with Ryjack's Re-Animizer after reviving Sledge's Crew and Snide. Lord Zedd was one of the candidates to be revived (other candidates being Astronema, Koragg the Knight Wolf, and Psycho Red). Zedd was Scrozzle's choice until Robo-Roxy reminds everyone of what he and Rita did to the Machine Empire's Royal Family on the day after Jason returned the Gold Zeo powers to Trey of Triforia. Sledge then commented that Zedd would secretly plan to betray Evox as well once he was revived.

In Power Rangers Dino Fury, the necromancer Reaghoul revives Lord Zedd at his evilest and used a Compliance Collar to control him due to the Emperor of Evil not taking orders from anyone. He sends him to Area 62 to steal the Sporix in order to make himself even more powerful. After being provoked by Void Knight, Zedd reveals himself and defeats him easily as well as Slyther and Mucus. He prepares to kill Void Knight but Reaghoul stops him. Reaghoul and Void Knight agreed on an alliance. Reaghoul resurrects Brineblast and Wolgang too. Zedd defeats easily four Rangers except Ollie who succeeds to escape with Solon. Later, Ollie frees Zedd by destroying his Compliance Collar. Zedd prepares to destroy Reaghoul for controlling him but he escapes just in time with Mucus. After being repelled by the Dino Fury Rangers, Zedd retreats. After spending a brief time in outer space, Zedd eventually breaks into Grid Battleforce and frees Scrozzle who retrieves his staff, growing ever more powerful. Zedd deciphers a signal from the Rafkonian people informing survivors of the Sporix Beast Wars that the planet has been hidden and directs them to its co-ordinates. Zedd, along with Scrozzle and his new generals, arrive at Rafkon with plans to seize the Sporix generator and create a new army on Earth. During a battle with the Rangers, Zedd escapes with the generator and brings about the destruction of Rafkon. The Rangers pursue him to Earth and Zedd is ultimately defeated and imprisoned in a crystal by the Green Morphing Master. However in the Dino Fury finale, it is revealed that Zedd has somehow escaped and fled into space to come up with another plan.

In Power Rangers Cosmic Fury, it's revealed that Zedd was freed from his prison on Zordnia by Bajillia Naire, the CEO of Squid Ink Inc, the galaxy's largest and most evil weapons corporation. Bajillia pledges her service to Zedd in exchange for him starting an intergalactic war that she can profit from. After Bajillia uses her Master Captivator to capture the Morphin Masters, Zedd decides to drain their powers to make himself a Morphin Master. However, Bajillia later betrays Zedd and traps him in the Master Captivator, intending to sacrifice him in order to create an evil version of Zordon's energy wave that will wipe out all good in the universe. After the Cosmic Fury Rangers kill Bajillia, they enter the damaged Captivator where they confront Zedd. Zayto, who has been resurrected a second time as a Morphin' Master himself, offers to save Zedd's life in exchange for Zedd giving up the power of the Morphin' Masters. Zedd reluctantly agrees to this and Zayto transports him to the planet Nibyro, where Zedd finds himself stuck in an eternal nightmare in which he's once again married to Rita Repulsa and is forced to cater to her.

He was performed by Ed Neil in the TV series, Mark Ginther in Mighty Morphin Power Rangers: The Movie, voiced by Robert Axelrod, Andrew Laing in Power Rangers Dino Fury, and Fred Tatasciore in Power Rangers Cosmic Fury. In the video game Power Rangers: Super Legends, he was voiced by Steve Blum. In the archive footage that was dubbed for Power Rangers Beast Morphers, Lord Zedd is voiced by Stig Eldred.

=== Dark Rangers ===
The Dark Rangers are the bad counterparts of the Power Rangers created by Lord Zedd. There are three versions of them:

- The first Dark Rangers are a bunch of punks named Justin (portrayed by Patrick Wolf), Zane (portrayed by Ogie Banks), Bobby (portrayed by Aaron Atinsky), Tina (portrayed by Jhoanna Trias), and Kristen (portrayed by Tausha Spears) who just enrolled at Angel Grove High School and first appeared to the Rangers after knocking around Bulk and Skull. Lord Zedd took interest in them. Before both groups can spar, they are teleported to Otherworld by Lord Zedd. Using a Green Crystal he filled, Lord Zedd transformed them into the Dark Rangers as the Rangers tried inform them what Lord Zedd would do with them to no avail. When the Green Ranger destroyed the Green Crystal, the punks were returned to Angel Grove in a normal state. They later made amends with the Rangers. (Note: According to stunt coordinator Jeff Pruitt, there were plans for a fight between the Rangers and the Dark Rangers. The idea was scrapped because the Dark Ranger suits were too low quality as the crew has imagined and the fact that they are repainted from some Z-Putty suits.)
- In the 1995 comic series, another version of the Dark Rangers was formed in the issue "Dark Thunder". Lord Zedd harvested the energies of the old Dino Coins to create another version of the Dark Rangers who would control the rebuilt Thunderzords. Due to Angel Grove not having any worthy bad people, Lord Zedd had to find worthy bad people around the world. He gained a bully from Zimbabwe named Farai Jukwa as his Red Dark Ranger, a looter from Japan named Osama Tezuka as his Black Dark Ranger, an avaricious man from the United States named Stanford Winner as his Blue Dark Ranger, a gang member from Colombia named Nelida Valensisi as his Yellow Dark Ranger, and a pickpocket from France named Marie Claire le Monde as his Pink Dark Ranger. Their Dark Ranger forms resemble the original morphed forms of the Rangers and Lord Zedd gave some of them the ability to speak English. Following the first fight, the Dark Rangers summoned the rebuilt Thunder Megazord to fight the Rangers in the Ninja Megazord as a rebuilt White Tigerzord appeared. When the Ninja Falconzord was being formed, the Dark Rangers and their Zords got away. Zordon commented that a Dark White Ranger would be impossible to create since the powers of the White Ranger can't be corrupted by evil.
- In issue #51 of the 2016 Boom! Studios comic series, Lord Zedd created a new version of the Dark Rangers where he tricked the Rangers into charging the Green Chaos Crystal using the monster Psychoslug. Once that was done, Lord Zedd teleported the Green Chaos Crystal to him. Noting that his last team of Rangers was weak due to human traits, he planned to transform his minions into the Dark Rangers. In need of a fifth Ranger to lead them, Lord Zedd freed Rita Repulsa from her dumpster and turned a strong Putty Patroller into a clone of her to serve him. When the transformation was complete, the Putty Rita Repulsa became the Dark Red Ranger, Baboo became the Dark Black Ranger, Squatt became the Dark Blue Ranger, Goldar became the Dark Yellow Ranger, and Finster became the Dark Pink Ranger.

=== Tom Oliver (clone) ===
Tom Oliver (portrayed by Jason David Frank) is an exact clone of Tommy Oliver that was created and put under a spell by the Wizard of Deception to serve as an evil Green Ranger variant for Lord Zedd and Rita Repulsa. He is referred to as "Tom" to differentiate himself from Tommy Oliver. Tom wears a green bandana with a ponytail behind his head. Being Tommy's perfect duplicate, Tom can easily deceive the Power Rangers to believe that Tommy has betrayed them to their enemies. He also has all of Tommy's tactics and training along with his former Green Ranger powers, allowing him to be able to anticipate most of his doppelgänger's actions. Under the Wizard of Deception's powers, the Dragonzord's strength level is on par with the White Ranger's Tigerzord, but only because the White Ranger was temporarily weakened by the Wizard.

In a battle with some Putties, Tommy was knocked unconscious, and the Wizard cut a lock from his hair and used it to create an evil clone, imbued with the restored Green Ranger powers. The clone tricked the other Rangers into meeting him in an isolated spot, where the Wizard of Deception sent them back to colonial Angel Grove. He then confronted Tommy, who was suffering a headache, caused by some of his powers being used to recreate the Green Ranger. The two Rangers fought each other to a draw until the Wizard intervened, zapping Tommy with his wand, causing him to demorph and lie in a coma. The Green Ranger then went to the Command Center to threaten Zordon, and then unleashed the Dragonzord on Angel Grove.

When Tommy was revived to full strength, he summoned his White Tigerzord to defend the city, but Dragonzord, energized by the Wizard's evil, soundly beat him. Tommy then stole the Wizard's wand, went back to rescue the other Rangers, and brought them back to summon the Thunder Megazord and deal with the Dragonzord. He then destroyed the Wizard, breaking the spell on the Green Ranger, whom he now called Tom.

Tom, much like Tommy was, was sick with remorse after being freed from the spell, but Tommy convinced him that he could still do good based on his own experience. Tom broke the spell on the Dragonzord and sent him back to the sea. The White and Green Rangers went back in time to colonial Angel Grove to destroy the Rat Monsters the Wizard had created to torture the other Rangers. Afterwards, despite Tommy's attempts to persuade Tom to join the Power Rangers, Tom decided to stay in colonial Angel Grove so he could make up for his past deeds.

=== Rito Revolto ===
Rito Revolto is a Gashadokuro monster who is Rita Repulsa's younger brother, Master Vile's son and the secondary henchman for her and Lord Zedd in the third season, often partnered with Goldar and a few times with Baboo and Squatt (whom occasionally were The Three Stooges of the PR verse). He is famous for his introduction saga entitled Ninja Quest, where he easily defeated and completely destroyed the Thunderzords and the Rangers power coins. As a result, the Rangers were defeated and lost their powers. He remained in Lord Zedd's palace afterwards and he constantly called Lord Zedd "Ed", which, along with Rito's stupidity, angered Zedd and caused him to yell at Rito to get his name right. Rito and Goldar placed an explosive device in the bowels of the Command Center and stole the completed Zeo Crystal before the device detonated, but they dropped their crystal on their escape.

In "Power Rangers Zeo", Rito and Goldar were taken in by Bulk and Skull after losing their memories. They were later found by Zedd and Rita, who after confronting them for their failure in not procuring the Zeo Crystal, restored their memories and returned to the Moon. In Zedd and Rita's first attempt to overthrow the Machine Empire, they sent Rito and Goldar to Earth and instructed them to launch Louie Kaboom (a renegade robot) into space as their first attempt to avoid Queen Machina from tracing the robot back to them. Though Rito succeeded, he subsequently lost the remote to control Kaboom and this earned both him and Goldar their fury because it left them with no chance of controlling Kaboom. Rito is shown to be a backseat driver and this got him in trouble with both Master Vile and Lord Zedd.

Rito made a cameo in the footage in the Power Rangers Beast Morphers episode "Making Bad".

Rito Revolto was voiced by Bob Papenbrook.

=== Master Vile ===
Master Vile (voiced by Simon Prescott) was the father of Rita Repulsa and Rito Revolto and was based on the character Yōkai Daimaō, the ultimate antagonist in Kakuranger. He was a tall demon-like being with large ear-like appendages and wore a dark cloak that had snakes seen emerging from it and wielded a magic wand. His home planet is called Gamma Vile, which was in the M51 galaxy. While Vile is calculating and straight to the point, he also has the personality of a crotchety old man, and is shown to be a protective albeit disapproving father and very comical. He also appears to be something of a coward. Master Vile and Lord Zedd have an obvious dislike for each other. This is evident when he found out Rita married Zedd and was very furious with her for it. The angry Master Vile yelled at her for being an idiot in marrying him and pointing out that she could've found someone else much better. Zedd was offended and called him out for the whole thing. He pointed out that at least he has the Falcon Zord and Ninjor, much to Master Vile's disbelief.

Master Vile arrived on the moon in search of the legendary Zeo Crystal during the third season of Mighty Morphin Power Rangers. He very nearly succeeded with the aid of an energy-draining monster he created and called the Blue Globber. After capturing Ninjor, the Crystal and the Rangers' Zords, Vile decided to throw an "End of the World Party" in the Angel Grove Youth Center before he would use the Zeo crystal to destroy the earth. However, Vile throwing his party gave the rangers the time and opportunity to locate and retrieve their Zords. Vile grew to giant size after Ninjor regained his energy and joined the Rangers in their battle against the Globber. Although his monster was destroyed, Vile survived the finishing attacks of both the Shogun and Ninja Megafalconzord, and still managed to retreat despite not appearing to be that badly hurt. On his retreat to the moon, he considered the failure nothing more than a minor setback and decided to stay.

Vile later summoned his old ally Dischordia (a monster that uses dance to control her victims) to battle the Rangers, and she nearly succeeded in taking control of the Rangers' minds. Vile was foiled once again, as Dischordia met her end courtesy of Ninjor and the Shogun Ultrazord.

Vile then summoned the Orb of Doom to the Earth, which he used to revert the Rangers to powerless children. He prevented Lord Zedd, Rita, Goldar, and Rito from destroying Angel Grove, revealing that he had more plans for the Earth. He sent a selection of monsters to invade the planet, led by his field general, Professor Longnose. When the invasion was thwarted by the Aquitian Rangers, Vile threw a tantrum and Rita reprimanded him for embarrassing her. Fed up, Vile fled back to his home galaxy, where he claimed "the bad guy always win". Zedd was overly happy to be rid off Vile to the point he actually kissed an annoyed Goldar.

After being overthrown by the Machine Empire at the start of Power Rangers Zeo, Rita called her father and begged him to let them stay with him. Vile reluctantly agreed knowing that his daughter would be bringing "that husband of hers" and told them not to wake him when they arrive. Master Vile also stated that the Machine Empire was worse than he was.

Master Vile appeared in the Power Rangers Zeo comic book, in which the forces of the Machine Empire attacked his planet looking for Lord Zedd, who was in possession of the Ninja Power Coin energies after he and Rita destroyed them in the television series. In the end, Master Vile handed the energies over to the Machine Empire despite the Rangers' attempts to stop the Machine Empire from getting them. The Power Coin energies plot went unresolved.

In Power Rangers in Space, Master Vile was last seen on the Cimmerian Planet attending Dark Specter's conference.

In the Power Rangers: Operation Overdrive episode "Once a Ranger", it is revealed that he has a grandson named Thrax.

=== Hydro Hog ===
Hydro Hog is the Umibōzu/frog-themed nemesis of the Aquitian Rangers and the main antagonist of Mighty Morphin Alien Rangers. He was known as the Emperor of the Dark Waters on Aquitar for his evil ways. He was known for having destroyed many planets. His main power is to consume all the water available before the Aquitian Rangers can get to it, leaving them dehydrated. Rita Repulsa and Lord Zedd sought out Hydro Hog's help when the Aquitian Rangers proved to be too much against them on their own. However, he was eventually defeated by the Shogun MegaFalconzord.

Hydro Hog was voiced by Brad Orchard. (Note: Hydro Hog was based on the Kakuranger monster Umibōzu who was originally a one-shot villain.)

=== Foot Soldiers ===
There are different foot soldiers that serve Rita Repulsa and Lord Zedd.

==== Putty Patrol ====
The Putty Patrol are the standard foot soldiers deployed by Rita Repulsa during the first season of Mighty Morphin Power Rangers. They are based on the Golem Soldiers in Zyuranger and are made from clay. Though neither particularly strong, intelligent, nor resilient, their basic power of numbers allow them to be a regular challenge to the Power Rangers. Occasionally, some of them were encountered that seemed a little smarter (Jason at one point fought one that was able to drive a car). Putties are mass-produced in Finster's Monstermatic through the use of steam-pressured molds and then sent through the Monstermatic in large numbers. Putties do have some manner of spoken language, though it is incomprehensible to humans, coming across as strings of garbled noises.

There had been some special Putty Patrollers that had been exclusive to each of Rita Repulsa's monsters.

- In "High Five", the Skeleton Warriors that assist Bones are skeleton-themed Putty Patrollers.
- In "Trick or Treat" Pumpkin Rapper is assisted by Putty Patrollers who have pumpkins for heads.
- In "Football Season", Rhinoblaster has some Putty Patrollers that are trained in football and make up his football team.
- In "Mighty Morphin' Mutants", Goldar trains six Putty Patrollers to fight like the Power Rangers. When one of them fails the training due to its clumsiness, Goldar teleports that Putty Patroller back into Finster's clay pot. The other five Putty Patrollers are given the Badges of Darkness which turn them into the Mutant Rangers, evil counterparts of the Power Rangers with Putty Patroller gloves and boots while being voiced by the actors of their Power Rangers counterparts. These Putties become the Mutant Rangers while Finster creates Commander Crayfish to use in place of their Red Ranger after Goldar had destroyed the Red Badge of Darkness. The Female Mutant Rangers are destroyed by the Power Blaster while the Male Mutant Rangers ones are later destroyed along with Commander Crayfish by the Ultrazord

The Putty Patrollers appear in Power Rangers with their vocal effects provided by Fred Tatasciore. They are redesigned as stone golems that can be formed out of anything that is made of rock.

The original Putties reappear in Power Rangers Beast Morphers.

==== Z Putty Patrollers ====
The Z Putty Patrollers (or Z Putties for short) are Lord Zedd's own army of Putty Patrollers. Despite being stronger than Rita's Putties, their main weakness is the "Z" on their chests which causes them to shatter/explode when hit. Following this discovery, the Z Putty Patrollers become less effective than Rita's as Zedd sacrifices durability for strength. In season three, the Putties and the Z Putty Patrollers are replaced by Rito's own army of foot soldiers the Tenga Warriors.

In the Power Rangers in Space episode "Flashes of Darkonda", a Z Putty Patroller is seen at the Onyx Tavern. An army of Z-Putties assists Rita and Zedd in their invasion on Triforia during "Countdown to Destruction".

==== Tenga Warriors ====
The Tenga Warriors are Lord Zedd and Rita Repulsa's new crow-like foot soldiers with them being wedding gifts from Rito Revolto. Rita states that Tengas are the most vicious warriors in the universe; however, the clumsiness her Tenga display suggests she got a bad batch. They are the only grunt soldiers to have their own theme song "Tenga Bye Bye". Throughout Season 3, the Rangers are never seen battling these grunt soldiers in civilian form, but used their Ninja Ranger or Power Ranger forms instead, implying the Tenga are strong enough to out-match the rangers without their powers. The Tengas also have the power of speech. The Tenga Warriors effectively replace the Putties because they cannot be destroyed easily as they can.

In Mighty Morphin Power Rangers: The Movie, Ivan Ooze had virtually identical soldiers called the Tengu Warriors, but created from his ooze instead of eggs. Like their TV counterparts, the Tengus are shown to have the power of speech.

In the Power Rangers S.P.D. episodes "Shadow: Part 2: and "Wired: Part 2", a Tenga Warrior is seen as a patron at Piggy's diner.

=== Ivan Ooze ===
Ivan Ooze is a fictional character in the Power Rangers universe, who appears as the main antagonist in the film Mighty Morphin Power Rangers: The Movie (1995). He was portrayed by Paul Freeman. Though Ivan is depicted as pure evil, he has a comical and charming side to him shown throughout the movie, typical of other villains in the series. He has his troops of soldiers including Oozemen that are easily destroyed by the Rangers and winged creatures called Tengu Warriors (based on the Japanese myth of the Tengu) which he blew up when they failed to kill the Power Rangers.

Ivan Ooze was a tyrant 6,000 years ago, until he was imprisoned in a large purple egg-shaped hyper lock chamber by Zordon and a group of young warriors. When his hyper lock chamber is unearthed by an Angel Grove construction crew, Ivan was released by Lord Zedd after 6,000 years of imprisonment. He was most angered by the boredom of his lengthy imprisonment, being forced to miss several disasters throughout Earth's history such as the Black Death, the Spanish Inquisition, and the 1981 reunion of The Brady Bunch. He also claims that he "had a Charley horse since the Renaissance". Ivan proceeds to demolish the Command Center and fatally injure Zordon and Alpha 5, leaving the Rangers powerless to morph, fight or even call their Zords.

After rendering the Rangers powerless, Ivan travels to the moon, and betrays both Lord Zedd and Rita Repulsa, trapping them within a snowglobe, much to their dismay. Their henchmen Goldar and Mordant then swear allegiance to Ivan rather than join Rita and Zedd in captivity. Ivan then begins brainwashing the parents of Angel Grove into digging up and repairing his Ecto-Morphicons (large insect-like machines similar to the Rangers' Zords) Hornitor and Scorpitron which he turns loose to rampage in Angel Grove. After this, he tells the parents to go and "leap to their doom", but the parents' children, with some help from Bulk and Skull, stop them.

After the Rangers gain the Great Power, they return to Angel Grove and battle Ivan's machines with their new Ninja Zords. Using these Zords, they can destroy Scorpitron. An enraged Ivan combines with Hornitor, and takes on the Rangers himself. The battle progresses into outer space, and though Ivan consistently has the upper hand, he is destroyed when the Ninja Falcon-Megazord knees him in the groin, which sends him flying into the path of Orion's Comet, which happened to be passing the Earth at this time.

==== Oozemen ====
The Oozemen are Ivan Ooze's foot soldiers that are made from his own ooze. Their name is not mentioned in the movie proper, but they are instead referred to as Ivan's "kids" just seconds before he forms them. The Oozemen proved to be too strong for the Rangers unmorphed, forcing them to call upon their powers. They are highly resilient to pain and fatigue, but if smashed by something hard enough, they are reduced to ooze.

In the Mega Drive/Genesis and Game Gear adaptions of Mighty Morphin Power Rangers: The Movie, they are officially called Oozemen.

=== Mordant ===
Mordant is a monocle-wearing warthog henchman in Mighty Morphin Power Rangers: The Movie. Together with Goldar, he defects from Lord Zedd to join Ivan Ooze, when Ivan imprisons Lord Zedd and Rita Repulsa in a snowglobe. After the destruction of Ivan Ooze, when Goldar claims he is now the leader of the group, Mordant follows him willingly, until Rita and Zedd return from their imprisonment.

Mordant is not featured in the television series in any manner and is created for the film, but he also appears in Marvel Comics' adaptation of the film and television series. In an early draft of the script as well as in some merchandise, he is identified as Goldar's second cousin three-times removed on his mother's side visiting for the summer.

Mordant was performed by Jean Paul Bell and voiced by Martin G. Metcalf.

=== Monsters ===
There are different monsters that appear in this show and are sorted by different seasons:

==== Monsters in Season One ====
The monsters of Season One are created by Finster using his Monstermatic to bring his clay models to life. Although Rita has brought forth some monsters through summoning spells as well. They are adapted from the monsters featured in Kyōryū Sentai Zyuranger with the exception of the last 15, which were part of specially created Japanese footage for Power Rangers which fans call "Zyu2". To make them grow, Rita throws her wand to Earth which emits energy that causes the Earth to shake and split open, releasing a steam that then enlarges the monster.

- Bones (voiced by Tom Wyner in the TV series, James Willems in Mighty Morphin Power Rangers: Rita's Rewind) – Bones is a skeleton monster created by Finster. Bones could detach his head and have it fly. He also could recreate himself after falling apart and jumping long distances. If his head is destroyed, the rest of him follows. Trini dropped Bones' head into a fiery crack in the ground which destroys him.
- Giant (voiced by Tom Wyner) – A knight-armored giant that is summoned by Rita after Bones' destruction. This monster was destroyed by the Tyrannosaurus Dinozord.
- Mighty Minotaur (voiced by Tom Wyner) - A Minotaur monster created by Finster that wielded a spiked club and a shield. This monster was destroyed by the Power Blaster. He proved too powerful as a giant for the Megazord, so Rita shrunk him back down after the Rangers escaped to learn how to beat him.
- King Sphinx (voiced by Richard Cansino) – A sphinx monster created by Finster with powerful wings that blow away the Rangers. This monster was destroyed by the Megazord.
- Gnarly Gnome (voiced by Steve Kramer) – A musical goblin/gnome monster in Viking attire created by Finster. He had the ability to become invisible and use his accordion to hypnotize people. Kimberly's deaf friend was immune, allowing her to inform the Rangers. This monster was destroyed by the Megazord.
- Pudgy Pig (voiced by Dave Mallow) – A ravenous pig monster created by Finster. He can eat anything, but cannot handle spicy food. The Rangers took advantage of Pudgy Pig being unable to handle spicy food to make him spit up their weapons. Destroyed by the Power Blaster. Rita later recreated Pudgy Pig in "A Pig Surprise" by casting a spell on a normal pig a disguised Putty Patroller left at a pet adoption drive. However, the Rangers were able to reverse the spell.
- Eye Guy (voiced by Doug Stone in "I, Eye Guy", Richard Cansino in "The Wedding", Dan Amrich in Mighty Morphin Power Rangers: Rita's Rewind) – A multi-eyed monster that is prone to eye-related puns. He imprisoned Billy's friend Willy within the dimension inside his main eye so Rita could use his genius. This monster was destroyed by the Megazord. Keen-eyed viewers of the Power Rangers series may notice that Eye Guy has made many appearances throughout the series: he was one of the illusions seen by the Rangers in "Island of Illusion", ambushing the Rangers at the Spectre Theater and attending Rita and Zedd's wedding in the three-part episode "The Wedding", he was among the Machine Empire's army of monsters during the two-part Power Rangers in Space episode "Countdown to Destruction", and was one of the monsters seen in the Shadow World's tomb in the Power Rangers Lightspeed Rescue episode "The Fate of Lightspeed: Part 2".
- Terror Toad (voiced by Michael Sorich) – A horned frog monster created by Finster. He swallowed most of the Rangers. A picture of each Rangers' helmet appeared on his belly when they were swallowed. Destroyed by Pink Ranger's Power Bow when its arrow was shot into his mouth.
- Madame Woe (voiced by Alex Borstein in the TV series, Cristina Valenzuela in Mighty Morphin Power Rangers: Rita's Rewind) – An elemental water fairy-themed monster who was an old friend of Rita Repulsa. She mistook Billy's girlfriend for a Power Ranger (due to Billy having just been at the location she was sent to), and captured her. This monster was destroyed by the Power Blaster.
- Mr. Ticklesneezer (voiced by Tom Wyner) – An elf monster created by Squatt from Trini's doll in her dream. He has the power to shrink anything and put it in a bottle as part of his collection. Rita either intimidated him or cast a spell, given she repeatedly got in his face while instructing him. The dream ended as Trini persuaded Mr. Ticklesneezer to put everything back.
- Snizzard (voiced by Bryan Cranston in his first appearance, Steve Kramer in his second appearance, and Bob Papenbrook in his third appearances) – A Ladon-themed monster with a lizard-like head. a snake-like body and tail, cobra-headed hands, piles of snakes for legs, and an apple-shaped part on his head that was created by Finster. Its torso is actually a large mouth where Snizzard can shoot out its tonsil snakes. This monster was destroyed by Pink Ranger's Power Bow by shooting the apple on his head. In "Zedd's Monster Mash", Doomstone revived Snizzard to attack the Rangers in Lord Zedd's Haunted Forest. In the three-part episode "The Wedding", Snizzard was recreated by Finster to ambush the Rangers at the Spectre Theater and attend the wedding of Lord Zedd and Rita Repulsa. He did interact with Saliguana during the wedding, performed the organ at the wedding when Goldar couldn't afford musicians, and was not seen fighting the Rangers.
- Chunky Chicken (voiced by Robert Axelrod) – A chicken monster created by Finster to kidnap a girl that Trini and Kimberly were looking after, so she could open a box containing the morphin eggs. This monster was destroyed by the Megazord.
- Genie (voiced by Tom Wyner) – An evil jackal-like genie released by Squatt and Baboo after they obtained his lamp from the planet Kanyn 4 of the Wolf's Head Galaxy. Rita enlarges him differently, instead shooting a blast from her scepter. He disappeared when Billy teleported the lamp away from Earth.
- Knasty Knight (voiced by Tom Wyner) – An evil knight summoned by Rita as a twisted idea of a birthday present for Zack. He was originally created by Rita using an evil spell and was first used on Tarmac 3 where he made "space dust" out of its finest warrior. Finster, Squatt, and Baboo were the ones who forged his sword. This monster was destroyed by the Megazord.
- Pineoctopus (voiced by Michael Sorich) – An unspecified prehistoric plant monster with plant-like tendrils created by Finster. He could turn anybody his spore touched into cardboard cut-outs of themselves (only water could undo the damage). The Rangers suits made them immune to the dust. Pineoctopus appeared on Earth in the form of Pineapple the Clown (portrayed by Vernon Ballesteros). This monster was destroyed by the Megazord.
- Dark Warrior (voiced by Tom Wyner) – A stealthy military-colored ninja monster in created by Finster. He kidnapped Trini's scientist uncle for his invisibility potion. However, it had been accidentally left at the Youth Center, making the kidnapping pointless. This monster was destroyed by the Megazord.
- Shellshock (voiced by Richard Epcar) – A tortoise monster created by Squatt and Baboo. Shellshock had a traffic light atop his body which created speed and freeze spells; Trini was forced to constantly move while Billy, Zack and Kimberly were frozen in time. For hand weapons, he had a hook and a baseball bat with a ball, as well as a large cannon in his shell. Rita was quite proud of this monster, as he managed to win a fight with the Rangers. This monster was destroyed by the Dragonzord and the Tyrannosaurus Dinozord.
- Spidertron (voiced by Tom Wyner) – A tarantula monster created by Finster when Rita heard of Zack's fear of bugs (especially spiders). He was hidden in a copy of a park statue until Zack blasted the copy apart. Despite his name, he appears completely organic. This monster was destroyed by the Dragonzord's Battle Mode.
- Spitflower (voiced by Mike Reynolds) – A flower-eating pitcher plant/Venus flytrap monster created by Finster. He can swallow countless flowers and make them into energy-sucking carnivorous plants. This monster was destroyed by the Power Blaster.
- Frankenstein (voiced by Tom Wyner) – A namesake-themed monster created by Finster. This monster was destroyed by the Dragonzord's Battle Mode. Tommy later showed up to the Halloween party at the Youth Center dressed as him upon getting the idea during their fight with him.
- Mutitus (voiced by Richard Epcar) – A powerful monster summoned by Rita along with Lokar. He was later upgraded into a demonic-like form with stubby arms by Lokar where it also sported Lokar's face on its chest. Destroyed by MegaDragonzord. (Note: In the original version, Mutitus' Japanese equivalent was what the Japanese equivalent of Frankenstein became after his first defeat.)
- Rockstar (voiced by Tony Oliver) – A rock golem-themed monster created by Scorpina. He can fire boulders that pinned his victims under them. This monster was destroyed by the Mirror of Destruction.
- Samurai Fan Man (voiced by Tom Wyner) – A demonic samurai monster created by Finster. He trapped Kimberly in a different dimension inside his jar so she would disappear after an amount of time passed. This monster was destroyed by the Ultrazord.
- Weaveworm (voiced by Doug Stone) – A silkworm monster created by Finster and used by Scorpina. He was used during Rita's day off when she did not attack Earth. This monster was destroyed by the Mega Dragonzord.
- Babe Ruthless (voiced by Richard Epcar) – A one-horned baseball-themed ogre monster with goat-like hooves and a pointy tail who was created by Finster. He could fire lightning bolts from his gloves and throw balls at the Rangers. This monster was called forth by Goldar when Rita decide to not attack for a day and fought the rangers alongside Goldar and Scorpina. This monster was destroyed by the Dragonzord's Battle Mode.
- Fang (voiced by Tony Oliver) – A fish/reptile/insect/crustacean monster created by Finster that was obsessed with Gooney Bird eggs. He could be manipulated by promising him said eggs or enraging him by destroying the eggs. This monster was destroyed by the Ultrazord.
- Cyclops (voiced by Richard Epcar) – A cyclops monster created by Finster. He is a doppelgänger who can assume the form of anyone including the Zords. This monster was destroyed by the Ultrazord.
- Hatchasaurus (voiced by Richard Cansino in the first appearance, Steve Kramer in the second appearance) – A bird/dinosaur/mountain monster created by Finster. No matter how much the Power Rangers had destroyed Hatchasaurus, Cardiatron keeps reviving him stronger than ever until Hatchasaurus was in his second form complete with horns and spikes. This monster was destroyed by the Ultrazord the first time. Terror Blossom later revived Hatchasaurus and this time was capable of speech. This monster was destroyed by the Thunder Megazord. The second time he was revived thanks to Terror Blossom. Hatchasaurus was destroyed by the White Tigerzord after he was weakened by the Thunder Megazord.
  - Cardiatron (voiced by Doug Stone) – A magical computer heart that recreates Hatchasaurus every time he was destroyed. Destroyed by Red Ranger using the Dragon Shield. Cardiatron was revived by Terror Blossom only to be destroyed again.
- Polluticorn (voiced by Richard Epcar) – A winged unicorn monster with dragon-like hands and feet who was created by Finster. He was sent to litter the planet in response to the recycling drive. However, he is never seen causing pollution. This monster was destroyed by the Megazord.
- Twin Man (voiced by Bryan Cranston) – A reflective mirror-themed monster created by Finster. He used his powers to turn the Putties into duplicates of the Rangers and took the guise of the Red Ranger as part of a plot to give the Power Rangers and their civilian identities a bad reputation. They first started by getting the Rangers put in detention while causing trouble in their civilian forms and then attacking the city in their Ranger forms, forcing the real Rangers to set up a quick scam to make Bulk and Skull (who they were also serving detention with) think they were still in the room while they left to defeat their doubles. This monster was destroyed by the Power Blaster.
- Goatan (voiced by Richard Epcar as the lion head, Tony Oliver as the goat head) – Goatan is a Chimera monster with a lion head and arms, a scaly torso, a goat head on the chest and goat legs, dragon-like wings on its back, and a snake-headed tail. He is also known as the Storm Bringer as he was able to summon blizzards, tornadoes, and hurricanes at will. Rita used a lion trophy as a medium for his creation. This monster was destroyed by the Megazord.
- Octoplant (voiced by Brianne Siddall) – A narcissus plant monster planted and grown by Squatt. Octoplant was a cunning, strong and unpredictable monster. She was very haughty and disrespectful, calling the Rangers "puny animals." This monster was destroyed by the Megazord.
- Goo Fish (voiced by Robert Axelrod) – A bony fish/anglerfish/octopus/crustacean/pufferfish/lionfish hybrid monster created by Finster when it was discovered that Billy was afraid of fish. He can immobilize anyone with his venom and glue people's feet to the ground with his goo. This monster was destroyed by the Megazord. Lord Zedd later revived him in "A Reel Fish Story" as one of the aquatic monsters to use in his lake monster plot. He and the other aquatic monsters are destroyed by Tommy.
- Fighting Flea (voiced by Rebecca Forstadt in the first appearance, Barbara Goodson in the third appearance) – A flea monster created by Finster. He can make anyone itch with his bite and can shoot needles. This monster was destroyed by the Megazord. In "Orchestral Maneuvers in the Park", Fighting Flee appears as part of Trumpet Top's illusions that he used on the Rangers. In "Ninja Quest" Pt 1, Fighting Flea was among the powerful monsters recreated by Finster for Lord Zedd's trap. He, Lizzinator, Octophantom, and Stag Beetle dislike working with Rito.
- Jellyfish Warrior (voiced by Richard Cansino) – A jellyfish monster created by Finster. He can teleport and emit venom that can eat through the Power Rangers' suits. This monster was destroyed by the Megazord.
- Mantis (voiced by Barbara Goodson) – A Mantis monster created by Finster. An expert at Southern Praying Mantis kung fu, but a liar and hypocrite when it comes to honorable fights. This monster was destroyed by the Megazord. In "Orchestral Maneuvers in the Park", Mantis appears as part of Trumpet Top's illusions that he used on the Rangers.
- Dramole (voiced by Dave Mallow in the third appearance) – A mole monster created by Finster. Dramole had the ability to travel underground without being detected. He also made a gas to hypnotize people which caused the adults attending "Parent's Day" to enter a zombie-like trance. This monster was destroyed by the Ultrazord the first time. In "Rangers Back in Time: Part 2", Dramole is among the monsters revived by Lord Zedd to guard the Rock of Time. In the three-part episode "The Wedding", Dramole was among the monsters recreated by Finster to attack the Rangers at the Spectre Theater and attend Lord Zedd and Rita Repulsa's wedding. In this appearance, Dramole had dialogue. This monster was destroyed by the Thunder Megazord the third time.
- Grumble Bee (voiced by Dave Mallow) – A bee monster created by Finster when Billy was upset over getting a "B". Grumble Bee could generate energy from his wings and his buzzing can deafen the Rangers. His venom could also eat through the Rangers' suits. This monster was destroyed by the Megazord the first time. In "Orchestral Maneuvers in the Park", Grumble Bee appears as part of Trumpet Top's illusions that he used on the Rangers. In the three-part episode "The Wedding", Grumble Bee was among the monsters recreated by Finster to ambush the Rangers at the Spectre Theater and attend Lord Zedd and Rita Repulsa's wedding. This monster was destroyed by the White Tigerzord the second time.
- Two-Headed Parrot (voiced by Robert Axelrod) – A parrot monster with a second parrot head on its his chest who was created by Finster and based on the saying that "two heads are better than one". This monster was destroyed by the Ultrazord.
- Peckster (voiced by Scott Page-Pagter) – A woodpecker/Pterodactylus monster. He destroyed skyscrapers with just a few pecks. With his large wings, he could blow anything away. This monster was destroyed by the Megazord. Peckster was brought back in "The Wedding" to guard the haunted Spectre Theater the Rangers were trapped in and was assisted by Rhinoblaster. Both of them were thwarted by the Rangers.
- Lizzinator (voiced by Dave Mallow) – A superstrong dragon-horned lizard monster created by Finster. Lizzinator's body was made of super-metals from another galaxy. He had super stink breath and was hard to defeat. Destroyed by the Ultrazord. In "The Wedding: Part 3", Lizzinator was briefly seen among the other revived monsters as they chased the rangers after they escaped Spectre Theater. In "Ninja Quest" Part 1", Lizzinator was among the powerful monsters recreated by Finster for Lord Zedd's trap that involved using Rito as bait.
- Pumpkin Rapper (voiced by Michael Sorich) – A rapping pumpkin monster planted by Squatt and Baboo whose jack-o'-lantern head is upside down. This monster was destroyed by the Power Blaster the first time. In "Zedd's Monster Mash", Doomstone later revived him in Lord Zedd's Haunted Forest and was later enlarged by Lord Zedd. This time, this monster was enlarged by Lord Zedd's grenade and was destroyed by the White Tigerzord and the Thunder Megazord.
- Slippery Shark (voiced by Steve Kramer, understudied by Scott Page-Pagter in "Orchestraal Maneuvers in the Park") – A hammerhead shark monster created by Finster. His blade can turn those hit by it against each other, which kept Jason and Tommy from working together. This monster was destroyed by the Megazord. In "Orchestral Maneuvers in the Park", Slippery Shark appears as part of Trumpet Top's illusions that he used on the Rangers. Lord Zedd later revived him in "A Reel Fish Story" as one of the aquatic monsters to use in his lake monster plot. As the Ranger fought Slippery Shark, Lord Zedd summoned Goo Fish, Commander Crayfish, and Pirantishead to assist Slippery Shark. He and the other aquatic monsters are destroyed by Tommy.
- Soccadillo (voiced by Brianne Siddall) – An armadillo monster created by Finster. He could turn into a ball and attack the Rangers. This monster was destroyed by the Megazord the first time. In "Orchestral Maneuvers in the Park", Soccadillo appears as part of Trumpet Top's illusions that he used on the Rangers. In the three-part episode "The Wedding", Soccadillo was among the monsters recreated by Finster to ambush the Rangers at the Spectre Theater and attend Lord Zedd and Rita Repulsa's wedding. This monster was destroyed by the Thunder Megazord a second time.
- Rhinoblaster (voiced by Richard Epcar) – A rhinoceros monster created by Finster. Rhinoblaster had a Putty Football Team and sent the Rangers into another dimension. This monster was destroyed by the Mega Dragonzord. In "Orchestral Maneuvers in the Park", Rhinoblaster appears as part of Trumpet Top's illusions that he used on the Rangers. In "Zedd's Monster Mash", Doomstone revived Rhinoblaster to fight the Rangers in Lord Zedd's Haunted Forest. In the three-part episode "The Wedding", Rhinoblaster was created by Finster, where he is among the monsters that ambushed the Rangers at the Spectre Theater. He later guarded the exit with Peckster where they were thwarted by the Rangers.
- Commander Crayfish (voiced by Tom Wyner in the first appearance, Wendee Lee in the second appearance) – Commander Crayfish was a red crayfish monster that led the Mutant Rangers (who were Putties using the Badges of Darkness). When none of the Putties proved worthy of becoming the Red Mutant Ranger, Commander Crayfish was created and made the leader of the band. He wielded a similar version of the Red Ranger's Power Sword. This monster was destroyed by the Ultrazord. This monster later reappeared in "A Reel Fish Story" as "Cruel Crayfish" where it had a female voice and assisted the recreated Slippery Shark, Goo Fish, and Pirantishead in Lord Zedd's lake monster plot. They were destroyed by Tommy Oliver.
- Oysterizer (voiced by Scott Page-Pagter) – A powerful oyster monster awakened by Rita. This monster was destroyed by the Megazord. In "Rangers Back in Time: Part 2", Oysterizer was revived by Lord Zedd to help guard the Rock to Time. In "Master Vile and the Metallic Armor", Oysterizer attended Master Vile's End of the World party.

==== Monsters in Season Two ====
The monsters of Season Two are created by Lord Zedd from an animal, plant, or object. They are adapted from Gosei Sentai Dairanger except for the first ten (being leftover "Zyu2" monsters) and the Wizard of Deception, the Rat Monsters, the Snow Monster, and Turkey Jerk (which were Mighty Morphin Power Rangers-exclusive). It is stated that the monsters created by Lord Zedd are much stronger than the ones that Rita had Finster create. To make a monster grow, Lord Zedd conjures a grenade and throws it to Earth, where the monster catches it and slams it into the ground, thereby enlarging the monster. He would use the grenade for the final time on Repellator in the Season Three premiere and introductory vehicle for Saban's Masked Rider TV series in the three-part episode "A Friend in Need". As seen in some episodes when the monster is destroyed, the item used to create it is restored to normal.

- Pirantishead (voiced by Scott Page-Pagter) – A piranha monster created by Lord Zedd from a piranha. He froze four of the original zords and took control of the Tyrannosaurus and Dragonzord. He could take control of any machine such as Bulk and Skull's ATVs. This monster was destroyed by the Thunder Megazord. Lord Zedd later revived him in "A Reel Fish Story" as one of the aquatic monsters to use in his lake monster plot. He and the other aquatic monsters are destroyed by Tommy.
- Primator (voiced by Paul Schrier in the first appearance, Richard Epcar in the second appearance) – A shape-shifting white baboon/gorilla monster created by Lord Zedd from Zack's ape costume. Seeing his reflection will reverse Primator's shape-shifting. This monster was destroyed by the Thunder Megazord. In "Zedd's Monster Mash", Doomstone revived Primator to attack the Rangers in Lord Zedd's Haunted Forest.
- Saliguana (voiced by John C. Hyke in the first appearance, Steve Kramer in the second, and Bob Papenbrook in the third) – An iguana/salamander monster created by Lord Zedd from Ms. Appleby's iguana when Bulk and Skull were feeding it. He can breathe fire and extend his tongue. This monster was destroyed by the Thunder Megazord. Afterwards, the iguana was restored to normal. In "Orchestral Maneuvers in the Park", Saliguana appears as part of Trumpet Top's illusions that he used on the Rangers. In the three-part episode "The Wedding", Saliguana was recreated by Finster to ambush the Rangers at the Spectre Theater and attend Lord Zedd and Rita Repulsa's wedding. He did interact with Snizzard. This time, he was destroyed by the Thunder Megazord.
- Bloom of Doom (voiced by Alex Borstein) – A multi-eyed flower monster created by Lord Zedd from some flowers in a flower patch that was near Kimberly. Her pollen could burn through the Rangers' suits and cause damage to their sinuses. This monster was destroyed by the Power Blaster.
- Robogoat (voiced by Steve Kramer) – A mythical cyborg goat monster brought to life from a humanoid goat illustration in the "Myths and Legends" book (which Tommy was returning to the library) by Lord Zedd to steal the Sword of Power. This monster was destroyed by the Thunder Megazord. In "Zedd's Monster Mash", Doomstone revived Robogoat where he assisted Pumpkin Rapper in ambushing Tommy in Lord Zedd's Haunted Forest. Then he fought the Rangers and was defeated. In the three-part episode "The Wedding", Robogoat was recreated by Finster to ambush the Rangers at the Spectre Theater and attend Lord Zedd and Rita Repulsa's wedding.
- Octophantom (voiced by Eddie Frierson) – A vain octopus/elephant monster created by Lord Zedd. Octophantom had a jar that could capture the Rangers. He was destroyed by the Thunder Megazord. In "Ninja Quest: Part 1", Octophantom was among the powerful monsters recreated by Finster to be part of Lord Zedd's trap that involved using Rito as bait.
- Stag Beetle (voiced by Wendee Lee) – An energy-draining stag beetle monster created by Lord Zedd from a drawing on a Stone Canyon broomball flyer outside the Youth Center. His purpose was to steal the Green Ranger's power. This monster was destroyed by the Thunder Megazord. In "Orchestral Maneuvers in the Park", Stag Beetle appears as part of Trumpet Top's illusions that he used on the Rangers. In "Ninja Quest: Part 1", Stag Beetle was among the powerful monsters recreated by Finster to be part of Lord Zedd's trap that involved using Rito as bait.
- Invenusable Flytrap (voiced by Andrea Harmon in the first and second appearances, Richard Epcar in the third appearance) – A Venus flytrap monster created by Lord Zedd from a Venus Flytrap on Venus Island. While he had a female voice in his first two appearances, he had a male voice thereafter. This monster was destroyed by the Power Blaster. In "Zedd's Monster Mash", Doomstone revived Invenusable Flytrap to attack the Rangers in Lord Zedd's Haunted Forest. In "Rangers Back in Time: Part 2", Invenusable Flytrap was revived by Lord Zedd to help guard the Rock of Time. This time, Invenusable Flytrap had a male voice. In the three-part episode "The Wedding", Finster recreated Invenusable Flytrap to ambush the Rangers at the Spectre Theater and attend Lord Zedd and Rita Repulsa's wedding.
- Guitardo (voiced by Tony Oliver) – A guitar-playing cicada monster created by Lord Zedd from a cicada that was near Kimberly's guitar and then subsequently stole the guitar. This monster was destroyed by the Green Ranger's Dragon Dagger, launched from the Pink Ranger's Power Bow.
- Turbanshell (voiced by Barbara Goodson) – A mollusk monster created by Lord Zedd from a large and unusual shell that Kimberly found at Angel Grove Lake. Turbanshell was used to steal the Green Ranger's remaining powers while in the Otherworld. This monster was destroyed by the Thunder Megazord.
- Pipebrain (voiced by Brad Orchard) – A trophy/string monster created by Lord Zedd from the Golden Pipe Karate Trophy. This monster was destroyed by the Red Dragon Thunderzord. Afterwards, the Golden Pipe Karate Trophy returned to where it was.
- Trumpet Top (voiced by Dave Mallow) – An illusion-casting tofu monster with two trumpets coming out of its head who was created by Lord Zedd from the trumpet owned by Zack's uncle. He caused the Rangers to see illusions of Grumble Bee, Saliguana, Fighting Flea, Soccadillo, Rhinoblaster, Mantis, Stag Beetle, and Slippery Shark which the Rangers fought until Zordon told them they were not real. This causes Lord Zedd to make him grow. This monster was destroyed by the Thunder Megazord.
- Mirror Maniac (voiced by Tom Wyner) – A mirror monster created by Lord Zedd from a mirror that Tommy had given to Kimberly. This monster was destroyed by the Thunder Megazord.
- Nimrod the Scarlet Sentinel (voiced by Brianne Siddall) – A fist-themed monster with a ring-like face created by Lord Zedd from The Sentinel statue in Angel Grove Park. This monster was destroyed by the Mega Tigerzord.
  - AC and DC (voiced by Brianne Siddall) – The assistants of Nimrod the Scarlet Sentinel. AC sports big ears with earrings and DC wears a necklace. These monsters were destroyed by the Mega Tigerzord.
- Pursehead (voiced by Steve Kramer) – A purse monster created by Lord Zedd from a purse that a Z-Putty stole from Kimberly. He had a mirror that could freeze his victim's minds, effectively turning them into statues. This monster was destroyed by the White Ranger.
- Lipsyncher (voiced by Alex Borstein) – A lipstick monster created by Lord Zedd from Trini's "Siren Song Red" lipstick that was in Kimberly's purse at the time. Ironically, she did not have a hypnotic singing voice despite the brand of the lipstick. This monster was destroyed by the Red Dragon Thunderzord.
- Magnet Brain (voiced by Michael Sorich) – A magnet monster created by Lord Zedd from Billy's science project called the Polarizer. His purpose was to destroy the Earth's magnetic field. This monster was destroyed by the Thunder Megazord.
- Key Monster (voiced by Mike Reynolds) – An unnamed key monster that was assigned by Lord Zedd to be the gatekeeper to Zedd's Haunted Forest. The fate of this monster is unknown as he isn't seen again after Tommy is put into the Haunted Forest.
- Doomstone (voiced by Tom Wyner) – A tombstone monster that lives in Lord Zedd's Haunted Forest. During the fight with the Rangers, Doomstone revived Snizard, Pumpkin Rapper, Rhinoblaster, Primator, Robogoat, and Invenusable Flytrap. After Pumpkin Rapper was destroyed and the other monsters were defeated, Doomstone's fate is unknown.
- Terror Blossom (voiced by Dave Mallow) – A cherry blossom monster created by Lord Zedd from some flower petals. He wore a suit and had a cherry blossom tree for a head. He could attack with blizzards. As Lord Zedd cannot completely defy nature, he needed to plant seeds in warm locations. This monster was destroyed by the Thunder Megazord.
- Beamcaster (voiced by Dave Mallow) – A microphone-themed monster that spoke in DJ lingo who was created by Lord Zedd from an energy output meter owned by Bulk and a fishing pole owned by Skull's dad. He hypnotised others into worshiping Lord Zedd, even the Power Rangers briefly. When unable to hypnotize, Beamcaster relied on oddly-shaped explosives. He was created by Lord Zedd from Bulk's energy output meter and a fishing pole that belonged to Skull's dad. This monster was destroyed by the Power Blaster.
- Four Head (voiced by Alex Borstein) – A four-headed Deva monster (from above, his heads would resemble a "+") created by Lord Zedd from an art class sculpture in Angel Grove High. This monster was destroyed by the Thunder Ultrazord.
- Silver Horns (voiced by Michael Sorich) – A tick monster created by Lord Zedd from a tick. This monster was destroyed by the Thunder Ultrazord.
- Skelerena (voiced by Tom Fahn) – A skeletal hyena monster created by Lord Zedd from the hyena picture on the cover of a magazine in the Youth Center that Shawn had been using to write a paper. This monster was destroyed by the Power Cannon. (Note: In Dairanger, Skelerena's Japanese equivalent is the monster form of Demon-Fist Master Jin Matoba called Garouki and was depicted as a skeletal wolf.)
- Scatterbrain (voiced by Mike Reynolds) – A kaleidoscope monster created by Lord Zedd from a kaleidoscope that Adam owned. He rendered the rangers amnesiac and helpless; first Tommy, Billy and Kimberly, then the rest of the team. At the cost of finally knowing who the Rangers are, Bulk and Skull used Billy's Prisms to undo the damage. This monster was destroyed by the Thunder Megazord.
- Pachinko Head (voiced by Michael Sorich) – A pachinko monster created by Lord Zedd from Ernie's pachinko machine after Rocky had been placed under Zedd's Spell of Irresponsibility. This monster was destroyed by the Thunder Megazord. (Note: In the original version, Serpenterra's Japanese equivalent crushed him when it arrived.)
- Showbiz Monster (voiced by Bob Papenbrook) – A video camera monster created by Lord Zedd from a camera that was backstage at "The Harvey Garvey Show". This monster was destroyed by the Thunder Megazord.
- Flame Head (voiced by Alex Borstein) – A Chinese warrior/potbelly stove monster created by Lord Zedd. Flame Head could blow fire from his mouth and ride a white horse. This monster was destroyed by the Thunder Megazord.
- Cannontop (voiced by John C. Hyke) – A cannon monster created by Lord Zedd from a toy cannon that originally belonged to Billy's younger cousin. This monster was destroyed by the Mega Tigerzord.
- Weldo (voiced by Eddie Frierson) – A scrap metal/Kabuki-themed robot monster created by Lord Zedd from Billy's welding machine. In his only brief appearance in the entire series, Weldo had been sent by Zedd to retrieve the Bookala's Lightning Diamond. This monster was destroyed by the Blue Ranger. (Note: Weldo's Japanese equivalent is the armored version of Bad Bookala's Japanese equivalent.)
- Bad Bookala (voiced by Bill Capizzi) – A monster created by Lord Zedd from a duplicate Bookala doll. This monster was destroyed by the Thunder Megazord.
- Jaws of Destruction (voiced by Chuck Kovacic) – A saw monster created by Lord Zedd from a saw in Angel Grove High's shop class. His name is a pun on "the jaws of life", which are used to tear open obstructions to save people. This monster was destroyed by the Thunder Megazord.
- Tube Monster (voiced by Brad Orchard) – An inner tube monster created by Lord Zedd from an inner tube that Bulk and Skull were using. This monster was destroyed by the Thunder Megazord. (Note: While the Tube Monster resembled Pipebrain, both their Japanese equivalents are separate monsters with this monster called "New Gorma Monster".)
- Photomare (voiced by Kirk Thornton) – A camera monster created by Lord Zedd made from a Polaroid camera, when he reverted the rangers to children. This monster was destroyed by the Thunder Megazord. Due to the fact that the Dairanger monster's costume was one of several not used in Saban footage, Photomare never appeared in the same shots as Goldar or the Rangers and was female. Despite its masculine voice, Photomare was referred to as a female.
- Wizard of Deception (voiced by Tony Oliver) – A time-traveling wizard exclusive to the series summoned by the Ghost of Darkness on Rita's behalf. Zordon is said to be a rival of his. This evil being succeeded in what Zordon has failed; the restoration of the Green Ranger's powers. He then endows the restored powers to White Ranger's clone and spurs him to fight the original. This monster was destroyed by the White Ranger.
  - Rat Monsters – Three rat monsters exclusive to the series that were created by the Wizard of Deception from three rats. The rodent menaces attacked colonial Angel Grove. They regressed back to normal when they were defeated by Tommy Oliver and his clone. (Note: The Rat Monsters were originally intended to be used as Ivan Ooze's henchmen in Mighty Morphin Power Rangers: The Movie, but the crew they felt too cheap for the movie. They instead decided to use them in the TV show, so the costumes wouldn't go to waste.)
- Snow Monster (voiced by Gardner Baldwin) – A yeti-like monster from the "Grumble the Magic Elf" book that does not like trespassers on his mountain valley. After causing an avalanche during his fight with Rocky, Tommy, and Kimberly, they were dug out by Grumble the Elf who stated that the Snow Monster got buried in his own avalanche. (Note: The Snow Monster is a recolored and fur-added version of Primator.)
- Turkey Jerk (voiced by Brad Orchard) – A robotic turkey monster accidentally created by Bulk and Skull (due to Skull reading instructions from a cookbook instead of a monster-making book) as part of one of their schemes to unmask the Power Rangers and was brought to life by Lord Zedd. He can wield a ray gun in battle. He viewed Bulk and Skull as his family and was loyal to them, instead of Zedd and Rita. However, they were scared of the monster and missed their opportunity to learn the Power Rangers' identities yet again. This monster was destroyed by the Power Cannon. (Note: Parts of Turkey Jerk's suit originally belonged to Chunky Chicken (now unplucked and wearing leather).)
- Mondo the Magician (voiced by Mike Reynolds) – Mondo the Magician was a fictional character in a book titled "Grumble the Magic Elf". He was mentioned to have been an old friend of Rita Repulsa, implying his image and personality may have been used for the character. After being brought out of the book by Rita, Mondo the Magician was enlarged. Mondo the Magician was destroyed by the Thunder Megazord. (Note: In Dairanger, this monster was the masked appearance of the main villain named Lieutenant Colonel Shadam.)
- Needlenose (voiced by Tony Oliver) – A cactus monster created by Lord Zedd from a rare species of cactus (classified as "cactal vocifera spinoctera") that Tommy gave to Kimberly as a gift. Needlenose had paralyzing spore needles, and he spoke in a nasal voice, often making Western-themed puns. Needlenose accompanied Goldar in a plot to claim the Old West version of Angel Grove for Lord Zedd and Rita Repulsa. This monster was destroyed by the Mega Tigerzord.
- Vase Face (voiced by Brianne Siddall) – A vase monster created by Lord Zedd from a sculpture Tommy made in art class. This monster was destroyed by the White Tigerzord and Thunder Megazord.

==== Monsters in Season Three ====
The monsters of Season Three are mostly created by Lord Zedd or someone wielding his staff, except for those created by Finster and Master Vile. Most were adapted from Ninja Sentai Kakuranger where they were based on different Yōkai. To make a monster grow, Lord Zedd would cross his staff with Rita's staff and both items would cause a thunderstorm on Earth that zaps the monster with lightning, enlarging it.

- Repellator (voiced by Michael McConnohie) – A green tick monster created by Finster with the ability to cause intense vibrations that repel what he wishes. Got infected by Kimberly's flu in his first fight and had to go to Finster for help. Rita and Zedd were both less than pleased that a monster fell victim to a human virus. He was the last one who gained Zedd's growth grenade. Destroyed by the White Tigerzord and Thunder Megazord in a primarily American-made Megazord battle using the mecha suits. (Note: Repellator is a recolored version of Silver Horns with a long tongue added.)
- Vampirus (voiced by Michael Sorich in the first appearance, Wendee Lee in the second appearance) – A demonic Baku monster whose egg was brought to the Moon Palace by Rito. He resembled a fortune-teller with bat wings. This monster was destroyed by Ninjor and the Ninja Mega Falconzord.
- Artistmole (voiced by Eddie Frierson) – An artist-themed Mujina/mole monster from Kimberly's nightmare where she was worried about being forced to move to France with her mother, who was dating a French artist. Finster's Dream Device saw the monster and was modified to suck him out of her head. Aristmole had the power to steal colors with his palette (if a person had their color taken, they would be left without energy) and cast explosion with his paint. This monster was destroyed by Ninjor and the Ninja Mega Falconzord.
- Lanterra (voiced by Mike Reynolds in the first appearance and Brian Tahash in the third appearance) – An Chōchin'obake-themed monster created by Rita from an Oriental lantern she thought belonged to Billy's friend, Adam, which was rumored to hold great power. This monster was destroyed by Ninjor and the Ninja Mega Falconzord.
- Marvo the Meanie (voiced by Michael Sorich) – An Amanojaku-themed monster accidentally created by Rito (using Lord Zedd's staff) on the Angel Grove science teacher Mr. Wilton (Rito had been aiming at the Rangers but did not realize he had the staff the wrong way around). Marvo could turn people into chemicals housed in beakers, which were the color most commonly associated with them, requiring a precise re-mixing of the formulas to return them to normal. Once Marvo the Meanie was destroyed by the Ape Ninjazord, Mr. Wilton returned to normal.
- Centiback (voiced by Brad Orchard) – A football-playing Ōmukade monster created from Finster's magic centipede and an American football Zedd was practicing with. His American football had the power to turn all who touch it into American footballs. It could be undone by Rita's magic or the Power Rangers' science. Destroyed by Ninjor and the Ninja Mega falconzord, in Kakuranger he planned to use his evil centipedes to control children by hiding them in Christmas presents, he is defeated and Christmas is saved.
- Hate Master (voiced by Michael Sorich) – A spell-casting, rap-speaking Nue monster created by Lord Zedd and Rita from Finster's evil seeds. Using sand gathered by Squatt, Hate Master filled most of the Rangers except for Aisha with hate. The only way to be immune to the Hate Master's spell is to find one's inner love or possess an item given by a loved one (Aisha had both). This monster was destroyed by Titanus and all six Ninjazords. (Note: In Kakuranger, he is the herald of Master Vile's counterpart known as Nue.)
- Face Stealer (voiced by Scott Page-Pagter) – An ancient Kahmalan/Nuppeppō face-stealing monster from ancient Kahmala that was trapped in an urn. Only special masks could shield potential victims from him. Rita released him, temporarily leaving the Rangers at half strength when he stole Aisha and Adam's faces, but the other Rangers were able to break his spell using enchanted masks that had been used against the monster in the past. Disgusted by Face Stealer's defeat, Lord Zedd chucks the urn that sealed him back to Earth. This monster was defeated by the Ninja Ultrazord and sealed away back in his urn by the Rangers.
- Miss Chief (voiced by Rebecca Forstadt) – A love-themed Kasha/fire chief monster created by Finster who wields a flaming chakram. Miss Chief obeys her lover Rito as a result of a love potion he found whilst messing around in Finster's workshop. Afterwards, she used a bubble gun filled with the love potion to spread love-crazed carnage among the students and staff of Angel Grove High School, whilst being the least hard to notice thing ever. This monster was destroyed by the Ninja Mega Falconzord.
- Katastrophe the Cat Monster (voiced by Catherine Sutherland) – A Kitsune/cat monster created by Rita from Kat's cat form. This monster was destroyed by Ninjor and the Ninja Mega Falconzord. Afterwards, she was restored back to Kat.
- Inciserator (voiced by Oliver Page in the first appearance and Richard Epcar in the second appearance) – A monster created by Lord Zedd. He was used by Lord Zedd to attack the Rangers as part of a diversion to draw out Kimberly who was weak after her Power Coin was stolen. After fighting the Rangers, Inciserator got away when Goldar succeeded in his part of the plan. In "Master Vile and the Metallic Armor: Part 3", Inciserator attended Master Vile's End of the World party. (Note: Inciserator's suit is a hybrid of three monster suits: he has the head of Kakuranger monster Nurarihyon (unused in this season), the partially-recolored body of the as-yet-unintroduced Merrick the Barbaric, and the cape of Dairanger monster Birdcage Vagrant (unused in Season Two).)
- See Monster (voiced by Brian Tahash) – A Mokumokuren monster created by Finster. He flashed people by opening his coat and zapped them with the eyes that are on the inside of his coat. He can also emit thought waves. See Monster was unleashed when the Rangers planned to use the Shogun Zords that Lord Zedd wanted them to pilot on his behalf at the time when Tommy was rescuing Kimberly. This monster was destroyed by the Shogun Megazord.
- Crabby Cabbie (voiced by Michael Sorich in the TV series, James Willems in Mighty Morphin Power Rangers: Rita's Rewind) - An Oboroguruma/taxicab monster created by Lord Zedd (using Finster's vehicular transformer apparatus) from a taxi cab that Kimberly, Bulk, and Skull were in. This monster was destroyed by the Shogunzords.
- Garbage Mouth (voiced by Matt K. Miller) – An Azukiarai/garbage-based lizard monster created by Finster. Garbage Mouth could project exploding energy blobs at his enemies. This monster was destroyed by the Shogun Megazord.
- Ravenator (voiced by Brad Orchard) – A large-mouthed, hunger-inducing hungry ghost monster created by Finster intended to make Tommy eat until he could no longer move. This monster was destroyed by the Shogun Megazord.
- Brick Bully (voiced by Richard Epcar in the first appearance and Brian Tahash in the second appearance) – A Nurikabe/brick monster accidentally created by Rita. When he ate more bricks, he assumed a more mobile form. This monster was destroyed by the Blue Shogunzord. In the Power Rangers in Space episode "Countdown to Destruction" Pt. 2, Brick Bully's first form was seen in Rita and Zedd's army.
- Sinister Simian (voiced by Brianne Siddall) – A Sarugami/gangster-themed monster created by Lord Zedd from a chimpanzee owned by Kat's aunt. After being made to grow, the Rangers, wary of hurting the monster, surround Sinister Simian in their Shogunzords, and the Blue Shogunzord restores her with a special antidote missile.
- Blue Globbor (voiced by Eddie Frierson) – An energy-draining slime monster created by Master Vile. He took on similar appearances to those he drained energy from, and formed a physical link to Ninjor after capturing him, who then became a human shield. This monster was destroyed by the Shogun Megazord and a released Ninjor.
- Dischordia (voiced by Diane H. Gillespie) – A singing Yama-uba monster used by Master Vile. Dischordia's singing abilities were increased by Master Vile so that she can control the Power Rangers. This monster was destroyed by the Shogun Ultrazord.
- Professor Longnose (voiced by Kirk Thornton) – A Tengu monster who is one of Master Vile's generals. He was summoned by Master Vile to fight the Aquitan Rangers following Professor Longnose conquering a Dark Galaxy star. This monster was destroyed by the Shogun Megazord.
- Parrot Top (voiced by Matt K. Miller) – A Kappa monster summoned by Master Vile.
- Slotsky (voiced by Stephen Apostolina) – A robotic slot machine monster with a magnet for a right hand who was created by Lord Zedd from Billy's broken regenerator device. This monster was destroyed by the Battle Borgs.
- Barbaric Brothers (voiced by Michael Sorich) – Eric and Merrick are twin Shuten-dōji surfer monsters that were used by Lord Zedd to poison the waters of Angel Grove to keep the Aquitan Rangers dehydrated. These monsters were destroyed by the Shogun Megazord.
- Bratboy (voiced by Paul Schrier) – A Zashiki-warashi/game controller monster created by Lord Zedd and Rita from the young Bulk. The Rangers made Bulk think about who he really was, reversing the transformation. However, Rita and Zedd changed him back and order Bratboy to attack. He retaliated, making Rita and Zedd reverse their spell out of annoyance.
- Witchblade (voiced by Wendee Lee) – An Amikiri/witch monster who was an old friend of Lord Zedd. However, she blundered in trying to keep the Aquitians out of water. This monster was destroyed by the Shogun Megazord.
- Arachnofiend (voiced by Julie Maddalena) – A Tsuchigumo/mechanic monster created by Lord Zedd from a spider in Billy's garage. She captured Billy to keep him from assisting in constructing a device to undo Master Vile's time spell. Mostly seen in the dark, Arachnofiend grew a wheel-like structure on her back upon growing. This monster was destroyed by the Shogun Megazord.
