= Ken Merckx =

American voice actor

- Born: June 24, 1964 (age 60)
- Occupation: Actor
- Years active: 1991–present

Ken Merckx (born June 24, 1964) is an American voice and screen actor who is also known as Ken Merchx and Ken Ring. He has done voicework for various Power Rangers series, but is perhaps best known for his role of Count Dregon in the short-lived Saban Masked Rider series, as well as his role as the voice of the Org General Nayzor in Power Rangers: Wild Force. He has also appeared on-screen as Dr. Michael Zaskin, a recurring role in Power Rangers: Time Force.

Merckx is also a stage combat instructor and fight choreographer who has taught at AMDA College of the Performing Arts in Los Angeles and staged scenes for a number of theater productions.

== Filmography ==
=== Live action/television roles ===
- Masked Rider - Count Dregon, Dregonator (voice) (credited as Ken Ring)
- Mighty Morphin Power Rangers - Count Dregon, Repellator (voices, uncredited)
- Almost Perfect - Waiter (ep. Dating for Ratings)
- JAG - Jogger (ep. Jagathon)
- Big Bad Beetleborgs - Ben (ep. 18), Phantom (Ep. 35)
- Power Rangers Turbo - Shadow Chromite, Translucitor (voices, uncredited)
- Power Rangers in Space - Waspicable, Lionizer (voices, uncredited)
- Becker - Waiter (ep. Point of Contract)
- Power Rangers Lost Galaxy - Hardtochoke (1st voice)
- 18 Wheels of Justice - Angelo (ep. A Prize Possession)
- Power Rangers Lightspeed Rescue - Ghouligan, Moleman (voices)
- Power Rangers Time Force - Dr. Michael Zaskin
- Power Rangers Wild Force - Nayzor/Super Nayzor (voice)
- Veronica Mars - Paparazzi (ep. Lord of the Bling)

=== Movie roles ===
- Vice Academy Part 3 - Officer #1
- Mind, Body & Soul - Police Officer
- The Boys of Cellblock Q - Boss
- Out of the Darkness - Cop #2
- Orgazmo - Original Orgazmo
- Without Limits - Eugene Register reporter
- Breathing Hard - Danny
- The Tomorrow Man - Dom
- Outta Time - Patrolman
- Hunter: Back in Force - Robber #1
