= Masked Rider (TV series) =

- Genre: Action/adventure; Superhero; Comedy; Tokusatsu
- Created by: Haim Saban; Shuki Levy
- Based on: Kamen Rider Black RX by Shotaro Ishinomori and Toei Company
- Starring: T. J. Roberts; Rheannon J. Slover; Ashton McArn II; David Stenstrom; Candace Kita; Ken Ring; Jennifer Tung
- Voices of: Jason Narvy; Paul Pistore; Wendee Lee; Michael Sorich; Steve Kramer; Michael McConnohie; Julie Maddalena
- Narrated by: Michael McConnohie (preview and credits narration)
- Composers: Shuki Levy; Kussa Mahchi; Udi Harpaz
- Countries of origin: United States; Japan
- No. of episodes: 40 (list of episodes)

Production
- Executive producers: Haim Saban; Shuki Levy
- Producer: Robert Hughes
- Production locations: California (Santa Clarita and Los Angeles); Japan (Saitama, Kyoto, Yokohama and Tokyo)
- Running time: 30 minutes
- Production companies: Saban Entertainment; Renaissance Atlantic-Films; Toei Company, Ltd. Bugboy Productions, Inc.

Original release
- Network: FOX (Fox Kids); Broadcast syndication
- Release: September 16, 1995 – November 20, 1996

Related
- Kamen Rider: Dragon Knight

Masked Rider is an American live-action superhero television series produced by Saban Entertainment and Toei Company, Ltd. It is an American adaptation of the 1988 Japanese television series Kamen Rider Black RX. It aired on Fox as part of the Fox Kids program block from September 16, 1995, to August 31, 1996, and then in syndication from September 9, 1996, to August 1997.

== Story ==
"On a distant and embattled planet called Edenoi, a young prince named Dex is given great powers by his grandfather, the King, and is sent to the planet Earth to protect it from the advancing evil of Count Dregon and his vicious Insectivores. Once on Earth, he is adopted by a kind family and learns to live as a human. With his companion Ferbus by his side, Dex is ever-vigilant, ready at a moment's notice to call on his powers to become... Masked Rider!"

— Opening Narration

The series began with the main character, Prince Dex, escaping the Plague Patrol with a small group of Edenoite rebels. Dex heads for Earth, the next target of his sinister uncle Count Dregon, who ruled Edenoi with an iron fist after displacing Dex's grandfather King Lexian. King Lexian had given Dex the Masked Rider powers (where the powers came from is a mystery, although they have been kept for some time by Edenoi's champions), which Dregon desires for himself. Arriving on Earth in a massive crater, Dex finds himself in the care of the Stewarts. A multi-racial family consisting of a white father and adopted daughter (named Hal and Molly respectively), an Asian wife (Barbara) and their adopted African-American son (Albee). The addition of an extra Stewart was not noticed by anyone (although, according to Albee, he and Molly are adopted) in Leawood, the town where the series took place in. Dex defends the town as Masked Rider from Count Dregon and his vicious Insectivores.

Edenoi was featured in Power Rangers as the planet where Alpha 5 was created by Lexian, the Edenoites' leader. (Although the continuity between Masked Rider and Power Rangers is unclear based on the differences in the origin story Dex tells the rangers compared to what is shown in Masked Rider)

Dex was dispatched to Earth by his grandfather to keep Count Dregon from taking over it. The scene in which Dex is given his powers by King Lexian (a scene that differs from the televised version) remains in the title sequence, possibly one of the few remaining aspects of the original pilot.

Dex's Masked Rider armor was also eventually given upgrades to change into "Masked Rider Super Gold", a gold-and-black variation equipped with a powerful laser gun, the Ecto-Ray, and "Masked Rider Super Blue", a blue-red-and-grey variation with the power of liquified teleportation and a powerful sword, the Blue Saber.

Edenoites are descended from insects, instead of apes. Dex is not aware that humans did not evolve from insects (as he discovered in "Pet Nappers" where he reports about how humans evolved from insects). Edenoites also possess telepathic abilities that are focused through a gem on their foreheads called mind crystals, which can be hidden telepathically, though in times of stress can become visible. The gem is capable of focusing mental energy, as well as creating mental imagery that can be shared with others. Dex possesses the knowledge needed to detoxify Leawood's rivers using solar-powered lasers.

Dex had a furry friend named Ferbus, a small bear/duck-like creature that followed him to Earth. Ferbus was kept hidden by Molly and Albee because Hal was allergic to fur. Ferbus is eventually revealed to the entire family during the series.

Dex is a loquacious individual. In the first episode, Molly and Albee told him to speak like a regular person, and that he could learn how to do that by watching TV. Dex misunderstood and spoke what words he heard in the way that he heard them.

== Characters ==
=== Main ===
- Prince Dex/Masked Rider (portrayed by Ted Jan Roberts) – An Edenoite who is the hero of the story. He is the grandson of King Lexian. Dex originates from the fallen planet of Edenoi. In Edenoi's royal family, the powers of the Masked Rider are passed down from generation to generation. As the current Masked Rider, Dex is sent to Earth as "Dex Stewart" to stop his evil uncle Count Dregon from enslaving the Earthlings. He is adopted by the Stewarts and tries to interact with US-American culture. Dex has many capabilities that Earthlings do not possess. He can materialize a crystal on his forehead to transmit his thoughts to others, use it to scan and x-ray, and sense nearby danger. Dex has superhuman strength, super speed, light wave generation, and telekinetic abilities. While trying to blend in, he appears unusual to everyone else. In order to transform into Masked Rider, he shouts out the phrase "Ectophase Activate!"
- Ferbus (portrayed by Verne Troyer, voiced by Paul Pistore) – Dex's pet and friend. Ferbus is a furry bipedal alien with a beak and looks similar to furby. He wants nothing more than to be at Dex's side. Ferbus has a big appetite and can get into some trouble at times, but fortunately, Dex manages to bail him out at the right moment. When Ferbus first arrived, Molly and Albee had to hide him due to Hal's allergies, but Hal is not allergic anymore around Ferbus; once he revealed himself, Ferbus was accepted as part of the family. In the episode "Pet Nappers", Nefaria states that Ferbus' species is called the "Monotomonax". The puppet for Ferbus was created by Chiodo Bros. Productions.
- Hal Stewart (portrayed by David Stenstrom) – Dex's adoptive Earth father, a full-time handyman and part-time inventor. His personal workspace is filled with assorted junk and recycled parts. Hal often assembles a weird invention in his spare time which sometimes backfires. He has, however, invented very useful items with some help from Dex. One of his more successful creations is the alien detector alarm that goes off when Count Dregon or his agents come within the radius of the house. Hal was at one point allergic to animal fur, though he had seemingly developed a tolerance as he no longer sneezed around Ferbus.
- Barbara Stewart (portrayed by Candace Kita) – Dex's adoptive Earth mother. She works as a caterer and part-time as a homemaker. Barbara keeps on eye on the family's well-being and constantly has her husband stick to his diet. In one episode, Count Dregon imprisoned Nefaria in one of the monster jars and brainwashed Barbara into his new commander Barbaria. Barbara's love for Dex broke the spell on her.
- Molly Stewart (portrayed by Rheannon J. Slover) – Dex's adoptive Earth sister. Molly always tries to steer Dex in the right direction and help him adjust to life on Earth. Since his arrival, they develop a strong sibling relationship. Dex in turn always supports Molly to the best of his ability. In one episode, Molly tried out for the cheerleading squad and made the cut, though her career as a high school cheerleader is never mentioned afterwards.
- Albee Stewart (portrayed by Ashton McArn) – Dex's adoptive Earth brother. Albee looks up to Dex with enthusiasm as any little brother would. He tries to help Dex get accustomed to Earth by encouraging him to watch a great deal of television. Of course, Albee's help can sometimes lead to Dex acting strange in public. In one episode, he dreamed that he gained the Masked Rider's powers upon bumping into Dex. In his dream, Count Dregon put Albee through a triple-death match against three tough Insectivores consisting of Manosect, Dread Dragon, and Cyborgator, but Albee managed to destroy them all.

=== Villains ===
- Count Dregon (portrayed by Ken Ring) – An Edenoite who is the main antagonist of the series. He is Dex's uncle, the youngest son of King Lexian, and younger brother of one of Dex's parents. Because of his place in the royal lineage, Count Dregon could not inherit the Masked Rider powers. He was banished from Edenoi for his evil deeds. Count Dregon is determined to have the powers even at the cost of destroying his own family and Edenoi. Count Dregon took advantage of Edenoi's peaceful way and enslaved everyone in full swoop. He wears a gold mask to hide scars he sustained in a duel with King Lexian. In the three-part Mighty Morphin Power Rangers episode "A Friend in Need", it's said that Count Dregon was an old rival of Lord Zedd.
- Nefaria (portrayed by Jennifer Tung) – A human-looking female in black-and-red armor, Nefaria uses the yellow feather on her helmet as a weapon or to write messages. She hardly goes into battle and is often seen on Earth giving commands. Nefaria has sometimes flirted with Count Dregon, but she's often ignored. Sometimes, Nefaria accompanies any Insectovores in the Supernatural category. Her eyes regularly glow bright red and she has an extremely sinister laugh.
- Cyclopter (voiced by Steve Kramer) – A blue one-eyed robot biker in a leather jacket and slacks. Cyclopter has faced Masked Rider in battle occasionally. He is armed with a laser gun and a powerful motorcycle named Cannon Wheels. His head can detach from his body to float around on its own. Sometimes, Cyclopter accompanies any Insectovores in the Robot category.
- Double Face (voiced by Michael Sorich) – A tall man dressed in a blue-green naval coat and white tights. Double Face's distinct feature is that he has two faces: his primary face is the large red visor on his "helmet" and the tiny face on his forehead. He has gone to battle Dex personally with various type of swords and daggers. Sometimes, he accompanies any Insectovores in the Man-Beast category.
- Gork (voiced by Michael McConnohie) – A small unusual creature that speaks in rhyme. Gork is constantly hopping about and annoying everyone else (especially Double Face) on the Spider Base. He is most cowardly and quick to ditch a battle before it's even over. Sometimes, he accompanies any Insectovores in the Alien Lifeform category.
- Fact (voiced by Julie Maddalena) – A small robot that gives out statistical data, calculations, and probabilities concerning a plan before Count Dregon makes any final decision.
- Plague Sentry (voiced by Tom Wyner) – The horse-riding insectoid-like leader of the Plague Patrol that oversees the enslaved Edenoites. The Plague Sentry first appeared in the Mighty Morphin Power Rangers episode "A Friend in Need". He fits the category of Double Face's unit. (Note: His counterpart is Gynagiskhan from Kamen Rider Black RX)
- Plague Patrol (voiced by Scott Page-Pagter, Stephen Apostolina, and Oliver Page) – Three horse-riding monsters that worked for the Plague Sentry. With their boss, they oversee the enslaved Edenoites on Edenoi. (Note: Each of the Plague Patrol members are repainted and hybrid versions of other Power Rangers monsters with horned helmet-engraved heads and furry padding added onto them: Plague Patrol #1 – Plague Patrol #1 has a generic body, a stinger-like ponytail and boots Scorpina's Giant Scorpion Form from Mighty Morphin Power Rangers with the hands of Ninja Sentai Kakuranger cat monster Bakeneko (unused in Mighty Morphin' Power Rangers Season Three).; Plague Patrol #2 – Plague Patrol No. 2 has a generic body the silver-painted armor parts of Gosei Sentai Dairanger character Master Kaku's final armored form (unused in Mighty Morphin' Power Rangers Season Two), the right arm of Ninja Sentai Kakuranger weasel monster Kamaitachi's giant form (unused in Mighty Morphin Power Rangers Season Three), and the necklace of Gnarly Gnome from Mighty Morphin Power Rangers.; Plague Patrol #3 – Plague Patrol No. 3 has a generic body, the silver-painted armor parts of Gosei Sentai Dairanger villain Iron Face Chouryou (unused in Mighty Morphin' Power Rangers Season Two) and the arm-saw of Eric the Barbaric's giant armored form from Mighty Morphin Power Rangers.)
- The Maggots – Tall, humanoid maggots that serve as Count Dregon's foot soldiers. They're not so bright, and hardly get the job done. Count Dregon makes reference in several episodes that the Maggots belong to Nefaria when he commands her to "dispatch her Maggots". They can spew slime and shoot threads from their mouths. A Maggot was seen in the Onyx Tavern in the Power Rangers in Space episode "Flashes of Darkonda" and the Power Rangers Lost Galaxy episode "Heir to the Throne". The Maggot costumes are actually an altered version of Power Rangers monster Mantis and were created by Chiodo Bros. Productions.
- Commandoids – The Commandoids are an alternate set of foot soldiers with hockey mask-like faces. They come in three colors: gray, brown, and black.
- Cogwarts – A trio of toad-like mutants that were sent to assist Plague Sentry and his Plague Patrol in their battle against Masked Rider and the Power Rangers. The three of them were destroyed by Masked Rider in "A Friend in Need" Pt. 3.

=== Supporting ===
- King Lexian (portrayed by Ralph Votrian) – Dex's grandfather and the ruler of the Edenoite race. King Lexian bestowed the powers of the Masked Rider to Dex when he became far too old to carry on the responsibility. He still communicates with Dex from time to time giving Dex guidance. King Lexian also built Alpha 5 who had been assisting Zordon years before Dex began his mission on Earth.
- Magno (voiced by Wendee Lee) – Masked Rider's talking car. Magno is a red car modeled after an ant-like bug. She is capable of driving at high speeds and digging underground.
- Combat Chopper (voiced by Jason Narvy) – Masked Rider's talking chopper. Chopper is a wisecracking motorbike modeled after a grasshopper. According to part two of the episode "Escape from Edenoi", he can go at a higher speed than that of Magno. With the help of Dex, Chopper can also change into two other variations depending on if Masked Rider uses his Super Gold form as "Super Chopper" or his Super Blue one as "Ultra Chopper".
- Patsy Carbunkle (portrayed by Libby Letlow) – Patsy is a spoiled child that thinks the world should revolve around her. Patsy always lies to further enhance her reputation as the most popular girl at Leawood High School. Patsy is condescending towards the Stewarts and thinks they're all weird, and often rivals with Molly. She does, however, have a soft spot for Dex and occasionally tries to flirt with him.
- Herbie (portrayed by Matthew Bates) – Patsy's friend and unwitting partner in her schemes, Herbie is a stereotypical geek. Although he is friends with the brattiest girl in Leawood, he is still a nice, albeit cowardly, guy and a pretty experienced Dirtbiker.
- Principal Henry Chalmers (portrayed by Don Yanan) – The principal of Leawood High School. Chalmers is much like Principal Caplan from Mighty Morphin Power Rangers and encourages teamwork and enforces discipline. He has an obsessive suspicion of Dex's unusual behavior. Although he means no harm, Chalmers constantly keeps his eyes on Dex hoping to find answers.
- Moon Dude (portrayed by Tom Ayers) – The owner of the arcade that Dex, Molly, and Albee frequently hang out at. His arcade has been host to several events and competitions that Dex and his siblings have participated in, such as a dance contest and a video game tournament. In one episode, Moon Dude employed Dex when Dex was looking for a job.
- Donais (portrayed by Winston Story) – An Edenoite who is one of Dex's friends. In "Super Gold", Donais is sent to earth to give Dex the crystal to enable Dex to harness the powers of Super Gold. He was kidnapped by Count Dregon's Maggots and the crystal was used to transform him into Robo Rider when Donais yells out the phrase "Robo Rider Force!" to fight Dex. This forced Dex to battle his own friend. In the end, Dex helps Donais see that he is Dex's friend. After being restored to normal, Donais hands over the crystal and Dex assumes his Super Gold form to fight Edentada. In "Unmasked Rider", Donais returned to Earth to give Dex the power of Super Blue. This time, Dex saves Donais from the Maggots. When Donais finishes upgrading the Masked Rider powers, Dex assumes his Super Blue form which he uses to destroy Tripron.
- Masked Rider Warriors – A team of ten warriors from across time and space who used the powers of the Masked Rider. They are summoned by King Lexian to help Dex battle the super-monster Bruticon. The Masked Rider Warriors are based on the ten Kamen Rider heroes prior to Black, who appeared on this show via footage from their guest appearance in the final seven episodes of Kamen Rider Black RX. The names were carried over from RX aside for a few changes. However, almost all of the Riders except for Warrior Leader (Kamen Rider 1) and Z-Cross (ZX) ended up introducing themselves with switched names during the roll call due to a mix-up between the edited footage (Kamen Rider 2 and Riderman were cut out from the introduction) and the voice clip that was used (all the names were mentioned in order, with Skyrider and Kamen Rider Super-1 being omitted).
  - Warrior Leader (voiced by Steve Apostolina) – This was Kamen Rider 1.
  - Warrior Commander (voiced by Mike Reynolds) – This was Kamen Rider V3.
  - V3 (voiced by Richard Epcar) – This was Kamen Rider X.
  - Riderman – This was Kamen Rider Amazon.
  - Masked Rider X (voiced by Steve Apostolina) – This was Kamen Rider Stronger.
  - Amazon – This was Skyrider.
  - Strongman (voiced by Mike Reynolds) – This was Kamen Rider Super-1.
  - ZX (Z-Cross) (voiced by Richard Epcar) – This was Kamen Rider ZX, the only Rider whose name was not switched nor changed in the adaptation, although the pronunciation was changed from the original "Zed Cross" to the Americanized "Zee Cross".

== Production ==
The series is a co-production of Toei Company and internal Saban production studio, Bugboy Productions. Though an adaptation of a Japanese series, the series is also a spinoff of the Power Rangers Franchise, and the series has a much lighter tone compared to the original version. The series also marks the first American debut of two Toei staff veterans, Kenyūkai Ōno (the suit actor for Masked Rider) and unit director Michi Yamato.

The show was launched with a 3-part Power Rangers episode, "A Friend in Need", with part 1 airing on September 2, 1995, and the other two airing on September 9. The Rangers themselves were never mentioned in the Masked Rider television series, however, as Saban reformatted the series to sever links with Power Rangers. The Rangers did, however, make a guest appearance in Masked Rider's short-lived comic book adaptation from Marvel Comics, as well as clips from "A Friend in Need" exclusive to the VHS release of the episode "Super Gold".

Like Power Rangers and VR Troopers, Masked Rider's battle and villain scenes, with few exceptions, were taken from Japanese stock footage – primarily Kamen Rider Black RX, but also two Japanese Kamen Rider movies, Kamen Rider ZO and Kamen Rider J. Robo Rider (episode "Super Gold") and the first form of Hydrasect ("Stranger from the North") were the only two of Count Dregon's Insectovores to appear in American footage throughout the show's run.

On May 7, 2010, the copyright for Masked Rider was transferred from BVS Entertainment and ABC Children's Entertainment to Saban Capital Group.

== Home video releases ==
In the U.S., two VHS tapes were released in April 1996: "Escape from Edenoi" and "Super Gold". Another VHS tape ("Ferbus' First Christmas") with a bonus episode ("Ferbus Maximus") was scheduled to be released but was cancelled. In the United Kingdom, Maximum Entertainment released both parts of "Escape from Edenoi" and "License to Thrill" on DVD in 2005.

| Release name | Release date | Publisher | Stock Number | REF |
|---|---|---|---|---|
| "Escape from Edenoi" Parts 1 & 2 | April 30, 1996 | Saban Home Entertainment/WarnerVision Family Entertainment | 42055–3 | |
| "Super Gold" Parts 1 & 2 | April 30, 1996 | Saban Home Entertainment/WarnerVision Family Entertainment | 42056–3 | |

== Reception ==
Shinichi Moriyasu, the former president of Bandai stated that the series was a commercial flop in the United States, and said that sales of the toys were low.
