= Paul Schrier =

American actor (born 1970)

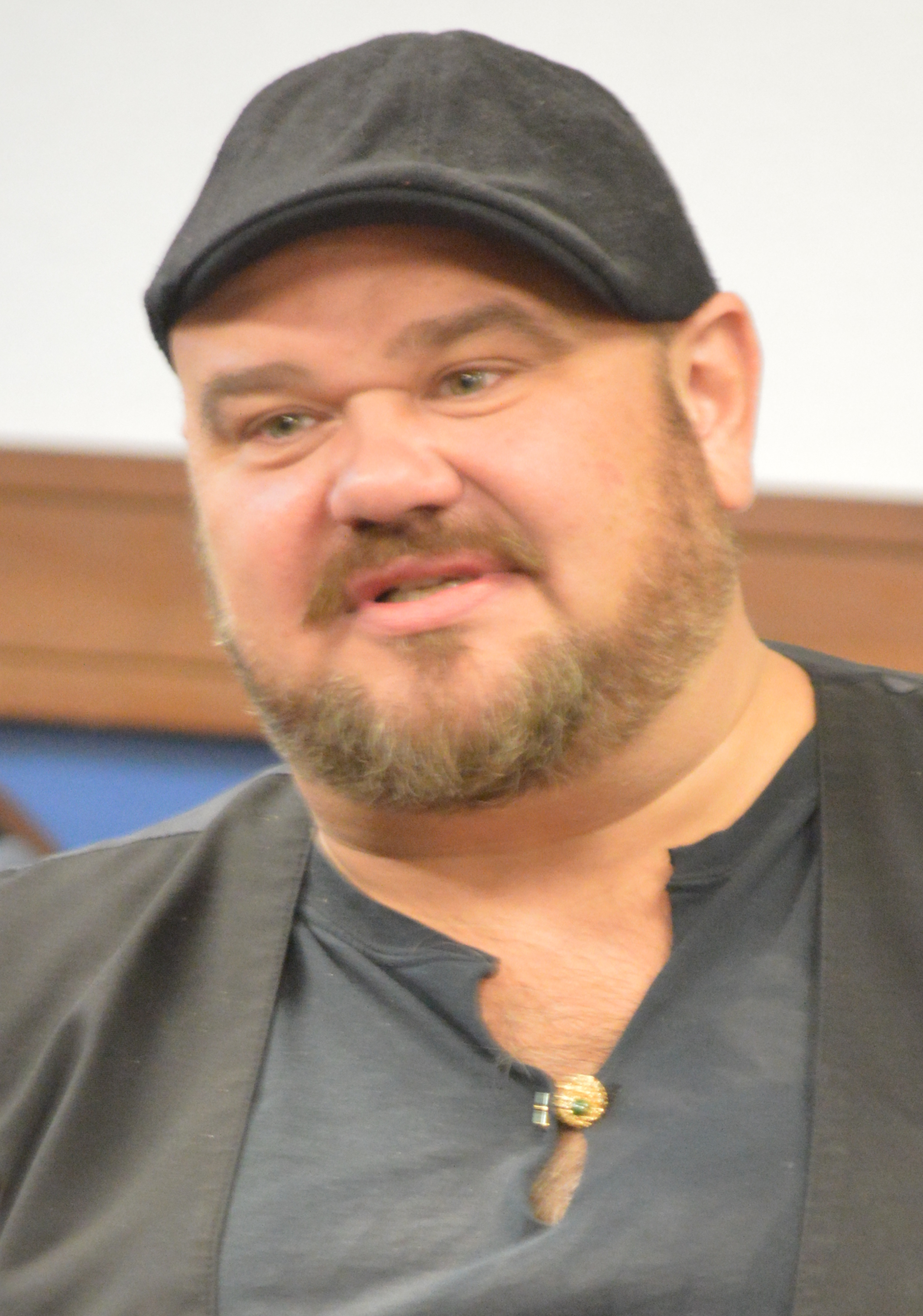
- Schrier at the 2015 Animate Miami
- Born: Paulus Laurentius Schrier II; June 1, 1970 (age 56); Las Vegas, Nevada, U.S.
- Occupations: Actor; director; comic book artist
- Years active: 1992–present
- Known for: Bulk in the Power Rangers series

Paulus Laurentius Schrier II (born June 1, 1970), known professionally as Paul Schrier, is an American actor, director, and artist. He is best known for his role of Farkas "Bulk" Bulkmeier in the Power Rangers series. He portrayed the character for seven seasons from 1993 to 1999, returning in 2011 for the eighteenth season of Power Rangers Samurai, and was the last original cast member to leave the show. Schrier has also done some directing work, directing a few Power Rangers episodes, 16 episodes of the Hello Kitty animated series, and a short film, "An Easy Thing". He is also an artist, having worked on the comic book The Red Star. In 2017, he starred in his first animation voice role as Flonk in Cartoon Network's Mighty Magiswords.

== Filmography ==
=== Anime roles ===
- Daigunder – Bone Rex
- Eagle Riders – Ollie Keeawani
- Teknoman – Cain Carter / Teknoman Saber

=== Live action / TV roles ===
- Mighty Morphin Power Rangers (1993–1996) – Farkas "Bulk" Bulkmeier, Primator (voice)
- Mighty Morphin Power Rangers: Alpha's Magical Christmas – Farkas "Bulk" Bulkmeier (video short/archival footage)
- Masked Rider (1995) – Fire Bug (voice)
- Power Rangers Zeo (1996) – Farkas "Bulk" Bulkmeier
- Power Rangers Turbo (1997) – Farkas "Bulk" Bulkmeier (In the first half of PRT, Bulk was turned into a chimpanzee by Elgar. He was restored in the second half.)
- Power Rangers in Space (1998) – Farkas "Bulk" Bulkmeier
- Power Rangers Lost Galaxy (1999) – Farkas "Bulk" Bulkmeier (guest appearance)
- Power Rangers: The Lost Episode (1999) – Farkas "Bulk" Bulkmeier (special episode/archival footage)
- Power Rangers Lightspeed Rescue (2000) – Infinitor (voice)
- Power Rangers Time Force (2001) – Severax (voice)
- Power Rangers Wild Force (2002) – Farkas "Bulk" Bulkmeier (guest appearance)
- Mega64 (2006) – Paul Farkas (cameo)
- Power Rangers Samurai / Super Samurai (2011–2012) – Farkas "Bulk" Bulkmeier (main role)
- Power Rangers Hyperforce (2017) – Jack D. Thomas / Hyperforce Yellow Ranger – RPG web series

=== Animation ===
- Mighty Magiswords – Flonk

=== Movie roles ===
- Mighty Morphin Power Rangers: The Movie (1995) – Farkas "Bulk" Bulkmeier
- Turbo: A Power Rangers Movie (1997) – Farkas "Bulk" Bulkmeier
- Le zombi de Cap-Rouge (1997) – Billy Jack
- Wicked Game (2002) – Mom
- The Order (2017) – Varus
