= Scott Page-Pagter =

American voice actor and television producer (1957–2021)

- Born: June 13, 1957
- Died: December 5, 2021 (aged 64)
- Other name: Scott Page
- Occupations: Voice actor, television producer
- Years active: 1986–2021

Scott Page-Pagter (June 13, 1957 – December 5, 2021) was an American voice actor and television producer, known for his work in producing over 300 episodes of the Power Rangers series, starting with the fourth season, Zeo.

== Biography ==
Page-Pagter began his career as an aspiring keyboardist under the stage name Scott Page, believing his surname Pagter to be hard to pronounce. However, he changed his stage name to Page-Pagter after being confused with other musicians named Scott Page, particularly the saxophonist and guitarist known for his work with Pink Floyd and Supertramp.

He was an ADR director, engineer and writer from the beginning, and then became a supervising producer on the long-running Power Rangers series from its third season of Mighty Morphin Power Rangers. He was eventually promoted to co-producer in its sixth season, in Space, and continued his work on the series until the 10th season, Wild Force concluded. In that eight-year tenure he provided voice-work for various characters throughout these series. Though he is probably best known as the voice of the villain Porto in Power Rangers Turbo (1997), he voiced a number of monsters over the years the show filmed in Los Angeles.

He also produced VR Troopers, Masked Rider and Big Bad Beetleborgs, voicing monsters in each of them. He helped to make The Mystic Knights of Tir Na Nog while he was in Ireland and was an avid composer, writing for many TV shows including Modern Marvels and The World's Greatest Magic series. He was also an ADR director for various anime shows including Daigunder and Tenchi. He produced and directed live action pilots. Later in his career, he worked on animated projects for Mattel until 2018. He later directed projects for Netflix and Bang Zoom! Entertainment.

== Personal life ==
In 1996, he began making wine as a hobby. He began making wine commercially in 2013 and later opened a tasting room with his brother, Gib Pagter, in Santa Clarita, California.

=== Controversy ===
In 2010, Pagter came under criticism when former Blue Ranger David Yost came out about his homosexuality in an interview with No Pink Spandex. He stated the reason he left Power Rangers was due to continued and escalating homophobic harassment on set by the production crew, as well as thoughts of suicide due to the harassment. Thereafter, Pagter stated to TMZ that Yost left over a bonus to his pay that ceased when two other actors with the same bonus quit the series, and stated further that "no one"—including any of the cast members—got along with him, because he was a "pain in the ass." Pagter did not elaborate on the identities of the other two actors with bonuses, why Yost was hard to work with or dispute any of Yost's claims outside reasons for leaving the show. Saban Brands, then the property's owner, did not release an official statement.

=== Death ===
Page-Pagter died from cancer on December 5, 2021, aged 64.

== Filmography ==
=== Voice artist ===
- Mighty Morphin Power Rangers (1994-1995, TV Series, 14 episodes) - Peckster / Oysterizer / Pirantishead / Plague Patrol #1 / Face Stealer (voice)
- V.R. Troopers (1994-1996, TV Series, 12 episodes) - Renegade / The Blade / Snowbot / Fistbot (1st Voice) / Venobot / Bugbot / Forkoid (voice)
- Masked Rider (1996, TV Series, 1 episode) - Robosect (voice)
- Power Rangers Zeo (1996, TV Series, 1 episode) - Fortissimodo (voice, uncredited)
- Big Bad Beetleborgs (1996-1997, TV Series, 33 episodes) - Wolfgang (voice)
- Power Rangers Turbo (1997, TV Series, 45 episodes) - Porto (voice)
- The Twelve Kingdoms (2002, TV Series) - Kouya (English version, voice)
- Power Rangers Wild Force (2002, TV Series, 1 episode) - Steelon (voice)
- Ai Yori Aoshi ~ Enishi (2003, TV Series, 1 episode) - Professor Itsuki (voice)
- Barbie as the Island Princess (2007) - Nat (voice)
- Adventures in Voice Acting (2008) - Himself

=== Producer ===
- V.R. Troopers (1994)
- Masked Rider (1995)
- Power Rangers Zeo (1996)
- Big Bad Beetleborgs (1996)
- Power Rangers Turbo (1997)
- Beetleborgs Metallix (1997)
- Power Rangers in Space (1998)
- Power Rangers Lost Galaxy (1999)
- Power Rangers Lightspeed Rescue (2000)
- Power Rangers Time Force (2001)
- Power Rangers Wild Force (2002)

=== Composer ===
- Bonnie & Clyde: The True Story (1992) (TV)
- Biography (3 episodes, 1996)
- Digital Cinema Solutions (2003) (V)
- Modern Marvels (50 episodes, 1995-2001)
- The World's Greatest Magic 1, 2, 3
- Biography (3 episodes)

=== Sound effects ===
- Grimm Masterpiece Theatre (1987)
- The Amazing Children (1989)
- C.O.P.S. (34 episodes, 1988-1989)
- The Super Mario Bros. Super Show! (65 episodes, 1989)
- The Chipmunks (39 episodes, 1988-1990)
- Video Power (1990)
- Kid 'n' Play (1990)
- Heidi (1991)
- Saban's Adventures of the Little Mermaid (1991)
- Space Cats (1991)
- Camp Candy (1 episode, 1992)
- Prey of the Chameleon (1992)
- X-Men (2 episodes, 1992)
- King Cobra (1999)
- James Brown: Live from the House of Blues (2000)

=== Voice director ===
- Teknoman (1992)
- Mon Colle Knights (2001)
- Daigunder (2002)
- Barbie in 'A Christmas Carol' (2008)
