= Royce Herron =

American actress and educator

- Years active: 1992–present

Royce Herron is an American actress and educator. She is best known for her appearances on TV, for example in Mighty Morphin Power Rangers as Ms. Appleby, the Rangers' school teacher, but also acts in theater and film. She has a Bachelor of Arts degree in oral communication from the University of Central Oklahoma and a master's degree in theatre from California State University, Los Angeles.

Herron teaches at Glendale Community College. During over 20 years in arts administration she worked for several organizations including the Army Music and Theater Program in Kaiserslautern, Germany, and the State Arts Council of Oklahoma.

== TV appearances ==
=== Mighty Morphin Power Rangers ===
- "For Whom the Bell Trolls" (September 15, 1993) - Ms. Appleby
- "Clean Up Club (November 23, 1993) - Ms. Appleby
- "Doomsday: Part 1" (November 29, 1993) - Ms. Appleby
- "Doomsday: Part 2" (November 30, 1993) - Ms. Appleby
- "Reign of the Jellyfish" (February 17, 1994) - Ms. Appleby
- "Return of an Old Friend: Part 1" (February 28, 1994) - Ms. Appleby
- "Return of an Old Friend: Part 2" (March 1, 1994) - Ms. Appleby
- "Grumble Bee" (April 28, 1994) - Ms. Appleby
- "Second Chance" (May 4, 1994) - Ms. Appleby
- "On Fins and Needles" (May 5, 1994) - Ms. Appleby
- "Mighty Morphin' Mutants" ( May 16, 1994) - Ms. Appleby
- "Putty On The Brain" (September 14, 1994) Ms. Appleby
- "The Green Dream" (September 19, 1994) - Ms. Appleby
- "Goldar's Vice-Versa" (November 12, 1994) - Ms. Appleby
- "When is a Ranger Not a Ranger?" (November 15, 1994) - Ms. Appleby
- "Lights, Camera, Action" (November 17, 1994) - Ms. Appleby
- "Where There's Smoke, There's Fire" (November 21, 1994) - Ms. Appleby
- "Rangers Back In Time: Part 1" (February 4, 1995) - Ms. Appleby
- "Return of the Green Ranger: Part 1" (February 20, 1995) - Ms. Appleby
- "Storybook Rangers: Part 1" (May 1, 1995) - Ms. Appleby
- "Storybook Rangers: Part 2" (May 2, 1995) - Ms. Appleby
- "The Potion Notion" (October 9, 1995) - Ms. Appleby
- "A Chimp in Charge" (November 18, 1995) - Ms. Appleby

=== Power Rangers: Zeo ===
- "A Brief Mystery of Time" (November 11, 1996) - Ms. Appleby

=== Sweet Valley High ===
"Much Ado About Nachos" (Season three, August 26, 1996) - German Lady

=== Power Rangers Turbo ===
- "Shift Into Turbo: Part 1" (April 19, 1997) - Ms. Appleby
- "Shift Into Turbo: Part 2" (April 26, 1997) - Ms. Appleby
- "Alarmed and Dangerous" (May 13, 1997) - Ms. Appleby

=== ER ===
- "21 Guns" (May 18, 2006) - Sveta

== Partial filmography ==
- Rocky Road (Independent, director Geoff Cunningham)
- Blue Ribbon (AFI)
