= List of Power Rangers Ninja Steel characters =

Power Rangers Ninja Steel is an American children's television series that airs on Nickelodeon. It is the 2017 entry in the Power Rangers franchise. The show follows Brody Romero (William Shewfelt), Preston Tien (Peter Sudarso), Calvin Maxwell (Nico Greetham), Hayley Foster (Zoe Robins), Sarah Thompson (Chrysti Ane), and "Levi Weston"/Aiden Romero (Jordi Webber) who protect the Earth from Galvanax, a reigning champion from Galaxy Warriors who seeks the Ninja Power Stars to conquer the universe.

== Ninja Steel Power Rangers ==
Based at the school's Automotive Department, Ninja Steel Power Rangers' arsenal revolves around being powered by the Ninja Nexus Prism. In Power Rangers Dino Fury, the Ninja Nexus Prism were created by Morphin Masters. The Rangers transform using Ninja Battle Morpher in conjunction with Ninja Power Stars and each wield a Ninja Star Blade and Ninja Blaster.

=== Brody Romero ===
Brody Romero (portrayed primarily by William Shewfelt; Taimana Marupo as a child) is the exuberant, youthful, and positive 18-year-old leader of the Ninja Steel Power Rangers and the son of a ninja master named Dane Romero. Ten years prior to the events of Ninja Steel, 8-year-old Brody was captured by Galvanax after his father mysteriously vanished.

After his capture, Brody was forced to work as a slave for Galvanax. During this time, he bonded with the robotic Redbot and a shape-shifting alien named Mick Kanic while gaining an enemy in his supervisor Ripcon. In the present after overhearing Galvanax's plan to get the Ninja Steel back on Earth, he, Redbot, and Mick take the opportunity to escape with the Ninja Nexus Prism. After being forced to use the ship's trash chute as an escape, he and Redbot became separated from Mick. Upon landing, he was attacked by Korvaka, but was saved by the unexpected arrival of Sarah and Preston. The three of them then pulled out three of the Ninja Power Stars, turning them into Power Rangers, with Brody becoming the Red Ranger and the team's leader.

As the Red Ninja Steel Ranger, Brody commands the ninja-themed Robo Red Zord that resembles Redbot.

=== Preston Tien ===
Preston Tien (portrayed by Peter Sudarso) is a teenage magician obsessed with magic. He and Sarah go to investigate the object that fell from the sky and save Brody Romero from the alien Korvaka. The three of them then pull out three of the Ninja Power Stars from the Ninja Nexus Prism and become Power Rangers, with Preston becoming the Blue Ranger and the team's second-in-command. Preston also has a very wealthy businessman father Marcus Tien.

As the Blue Ninja Steel Ranger, Preston commands the European dragon-themed Dragon Zord. Uniquely, though, he wields powerful magical abilities.

=== Calvin Maxwell ===
Calvin Maxwell (portrayed by Nico Greetham) (Note: Chantz Simpson was originally cast for the part before the role was recast.) is a teenager who is an expert mechanic. He becomes the Yellow Ninja Steel Ranger upon being saved from Ripperat by the Nexus Prism. He is also Hayley's boyfriend.

It was revealed that Calvin had a fear of driving after an incident where he crashed a go-kart into a duck pond and since used Hayley as his personal driver. With advice from Mick, Calvin overcame his fear to save the other Rangers from Tangleweb.

As the Yellow Ninja Steel Ranger, Calvin commands the Nitro Zord which is a dump truck-themed Zord. In addition, Calvin has a name for his personal vehicle, his yellow truck as "Nitro", and treats his truck as if it was living.

=== Hayley Foster ===
Hayley Foster (portrayed by Zoë Robins) is a virtuous teenager who has a love for the outdoors, nature, and healthy living. She owns a pet Siberian Husky named Kody. Hayley became the White Ninja Steel Ranger upon being saved from Ripperat by the Nexus Prism. She is also Calvin's girlfriend and personal driver at the time he had the fear of driving. Her father Aaron (portrayed by Marcus Johnson) is a marine biologist and first appears in "Making Waves".

As the White Ninja Steel Ranger, Hayley commands the ninja dog-themed Kodiak Zord which resembles Kody and carries a kunai in its mouth.

=== Sarah Thompson ===
Sarah Thompson (portrayed by Chrysti Ane) is the brains of the team and an adrenaline junkie. She intends to be a great engineer and is the person who designs gadgets to suit the Rangers' needs. As a new student at Summer Cove High, arriving on her handmade hoverboard, she runs into Monty and Victor. After Victor tries to use her hoverboard and crashes into Preston's magic show she and Preston notice objects falling from the sky. She and Preston go to investigate and save Brody Romero from the alien Korvaka. The three of them then pull out three of the Ninja Power Stars from the Ninja Nexus Prism and become Power Rangers, with Sarah becoming the Pink Ranger. Her mother Jackie (Jodie Rimmer) is also an engineer.

As the Pink Ninja Steel Ranger, Sarah commands the Zoom Zord which is a bullet train-themed Zord that resembles her hoverboard.

=== Aiden Romero/Levi Weston ===
Levi Weston (portrayed primarily by Jordi Webber; Ethan Buckwell as a child) is a country singer. Levi Weston is the alias of Aiden Romero, who got separated from his brother Brody following Galvanax's attack on their father Dane Romero and took the alias as a way to hide in plain sight from Galvanax. At some point while working on his next album, he was captured and experimented upon by Madame Odius that involved the Gold Ninja Power Star that found him. His disappearance was reported by his manager Tom. One part of Odius' experiments on him was that she transferred his memories of being Aiden Romero into a human-like robot.

After being freed by the Astro Zord, Levi fought off every contestant that Odius sent after him. His true identity was revealed when he fought Ripcon after he captured Tom and had trapped the Rangers in a net. He fought off Ripcon and even helped the Rangers fight a Skullgator. Following the battle, Levi meets Mick Kanic who gives him the Storm Star and the Zord Star. When the Aiden Romero Robot is destroyed and following the destruction of Ripcon, Levi regained his memories of being Aiden in time for Summer Cove High's talent show. Brody learned the truth about Aiden/Levi when he joins him in singing the song that their father wrote for them.

As the Gold Ranger, Levi/Aiden commands the cowboy/ninja-themed Robo Rider Zord and the bison/ATV-themed Ninja Bull Zord, which combine to form the Bull Rider Megazord.

== Allies ==
=== Redbot ===
Redbot is a ninja-themed robot that Brody befriends while they were slaves on Galvanax's ship. He serves as the inspiration for the Robo Red Zord.

Redbot is performed by Kohji Mimura in Ninja Steel, Emma Carr in Super Ninja Steel, and voiced by Byron Coll.

=== Mick Kanic ===
Mick Kanic (portrayed by Kelson Henderson) is an alien slave from the Lion Galaxy with the ability to shapeshift into inanimate objects and was the head mechanic onboard Galvanax's ship until he, Brody and Redbot escaped via the garbage chute. His servitude on Galvanax's ship was because Princess Viera's family sold him and 99 other inhabitants of the Lion Galaxy to Galvanax.

After escaping, Mick became separated from Brody and Redbot, meeting up with Calvin and Hayley. They take him to their high school where Mick is mistaken for the new shop teacher by Principal Hastings and is hired on the spot.

Mick is skilled in mechanical engineering and repair, and is the top Mechanic on the Warrior Dome. He also has knowledge of Power Rangers and the Ninja Nexus Prism, and created more Ninja Power Stars for the Rangers' needs.

When Mick encountered Princess Viera, he told the Rangers about what her family had done to him and the Lion Galaxy inhabitants that were sold to Galvanax. Following Drillion's defeat, Princess Viera made amends with Mick by enabling him to contact his parents. Mick tells his parents that he is not coming home yet as he is helping the Rangers in their fight against Galvanax's forces.

Mick and Dane Romero were able to morph into their own variations of the Ninja Steel Red Ranger. Following Galvanax's destruction, Mick states to the Rangers that he is going to take a space taxi and pay a visit to his parents.

Mick later returns to Earth on a space taxi to warn the Rangers about the new season of "Galaxy Warriors", and thus have no choice but to stay with the Rangers, as he felt they still needed him when "Galaxy Warriors" is still around to hunt the Rangers.

General Tynamon uses Madame Odius' mind-control device to take control of Mick. After making a cover-up that is going to the Lion Galaxy to visit his sick parents, a mind-controlled Mick tells Odius that he can make a satellite to expand Odius' mind-control plot.

At the end of the series, Mick and Redbot choose to remain on Earth with the Rangers while maintaining contact with his parents in the Lion Galaxy.

=== Dane Romero ===
Dane Romero (portrayed by Mike Edward) is the father of both Brody and Aiden Romero/Levi Weston, as well as the original Ninja Steel Red Ranger before the former. Dane is also an alumnus of Summer Cove High twenty years. After his wife died, sometimes after Brody's birth, Dane taught them the way of ninja and their signature Romero family song. He was the first to discover that the Ninja Nexus Prism landed on his yard, and was chosen to be its guardian. While inventing the Ninja Steel, his family was attacked by Galvanax and his Galaxy Warriors. Despite Dane's supposed sacrifice on splitting the Ninja Nexus Star into six Power Stars, Brody had been kidnapped by Galvanax while Aiden managed to escape and secure the Ninja Steel inside his father's high school trophy.

In "Galvanax Rises", Dane's soul is revealed to have been preserved inside the Ninja Nexus Prism and is later revived without physically aging while also becoming another variation of the Red Ranger alongside Mick. Following Galvanax's destruction, Dane and both of his sons along with the other Rangers, Mick and Redbot are having a camp together.

Shortly before the new season of "Galaxy Warriors", Dane briefly appears putting his trophy, which was used to contain the Ninja Steel, back to his old alma mater, then bidding his two sons a good luck for their school days before departing back home.

At some point after Madame Odius begins her final plan to enslave humanity while taking the power of the Super Ninja Nexus Prism for herself, Dane was among the brainwashed victims. The brainwashed Dane is enlisted to guard both Odius and the brainwashed Mick. Against his will, he attacked both of his sons and Preston until Hayley and Sarah destroy the mind control satellite situated on the Galaxy Warriors airship, thereby freeing him and the rest of the brainwashed victims.

=== Princess Viera ===
Princess Viera (portrayed by Ruby Love) is the princess of the Lion Galaxy with the ability to shapeshift. Her family was responsible for selling 100 Lion Galaxy inhabitants to Galvanax, one of them being Mick Kanic. Viera is the owner of the Lion Fire Zord, which serves as her mode of transportation.

Sometime later, Viera arrived at the Warrior Dome ship to take her opportunity at fighting the Rangers on "Galaxy Warriors" with the aid of her royal guard Drillion. While she believes her family's "Might Makes Right" way, she doesn't seem to follow it as Sarah's kindness confirms this. This causes Viera to turn against Galvanax, causing him to convince Drillion into overthrowing her. This plot failed with the help of the Rangers as Viera plans to bring change to the Lion Galaxy. She makes amends with Mick Kanic by enabling him to contact his parents.

Viera later sends the Rangers Ninja Stars associated with the Lion Fire Zord and the Lion Fire Armor and a Lion Galaxy Spellbook for Preston to practice with.

=== Sheriff Skyfire ===
Sheriff Skyfire (voiced by Mark Mitchinson) is an intergalactic police officer. (Note: Sheriff Skyfire is based on the title character from Sekai Ninja Sen Jiraiya.)

He crashed the latest episode of "Galaxy Warriors" to arrest Blammo for his illegal demolition activity. Madame Odius appeared where she tricks Sheriff Skyfire into going after the Rangers. Both sides duel until they rescue an elderly woman that nearly got caught in the crossfire. Realizing that he was lied to, Sheriff Skyfire agrees to help the Rangers while being informed of every monster that attacked Earth on Odius' behalf. In addition, he gives a morality lesson to the Rangers on respecting law enforcement like when Hayley got ticketed by Summer Cove High School's security guard Clint. When the bomb that Blammo planted was destroyed, Sheriff Skyfire assisted in fighting Blammo and lent his sword to Brody to defeat Blammo. After Blammo was hit by the Gigantify Ray, Sheriff Skyfire watched the fight. Following Blammo's destruction, Sheriff Skyfire thanked the Rangers and teleported away to receive his next assignment from his superiors.

== Legendary Rangers ==
=== Tommy Oliver ===
Tommy Oliver (portrayed by Jason David Frank) is the original Green Ranger. He also appears as the original White Ranger, the Zeo Red Ranger, and the Black Dino Ranger. He was also T.J.'s predecessor as the original Red Turbo Ranger.

=== Rocky DeSantos ===
Rocky DeSantos (portrayed by Steve Cardenas) is the new Red Ranger and successor to Jason Lee Scott. He was also the Blue Zeo Ranger.

=== Katherine Hillard ===
Katherine Hillard (portrayed by Catherine Sutherland) is the original Pink Turbo Ranger.

=== T.J. Johnson ===
T.J. Johnson ( portrayed by Selwyn Ward) is the Blue Space Ranger and Tommy's successor as the new Red Turbo Ranger.

=== Wesley Collins ===
Wesley Collins (portrayed by Jason Faunt) is the Red Time Force Ranger.

=== Trent Fernandez-Mercer ===
Trent Fernandez-Mercer (portrayed by Jeffrey Parazzo) is the Dino Thunder White Ranger.

=== Gemma ===
Gemma (portrayed by Li Ming Hu) is the RPM Silver Ranger.

=== Antonio Garcia ===
Antonio Garcia (portrayed by Steven Skyler) is the Gold Samurai Ranger.

=== Gia Moran ===
Gia Moran (portrayed by Ciara Hanna) is the Yellow Megaforce Ranger.

=== Koda ===
Koda (portrayed by Yoshi Sudarso) is the Blue Dino Charge Ranger and a caveman who comes from the Dino Charge reality.

== Supporting characters ==
=== Victor Vincent ===
Victor Vincent (portrayed by Chris Reid) is an unpopular, pretentious, and athletic student who is the class president of Summer Cove High School and has a massive ego. Victor is always coming up with plans to become popular with Monty's help which often goes comically awry. He has 49 trophies and attempts to collect the 50th trophy by cheating, though his cheating is always revealed and ends up hilarious.

In "Helping Hand", Victor and Monty's magnetic device for shop class attracting the Ninja Stars which caught the attention of a Buzzcam. While Galvanax has Madame Odius and the Basher Bots take Victor and Monty as hostages, Galvanax makes plans for the season finale of "Galaxy Warriors".

In "Galvanax Rises", Victor and Monty are roped in by Odius into building the Mega-Magnet to help her in destroying the Rangers. Both of them managed to escape and tell the news media about their survival.

In "Echoes of Evil", the two try to sell products that they used during their escape and got a lot of money and they dropped out of school claiming that they are done with it. However, the cans didn't work against Smellaphant and they were forced to give all the money back and go back to school where Principal Hastings reluctantly gave in to their demands as the check they gave her is no longer good.

In "Doom Signal", Victor and Monty win Gorrox's audition, which led to them getting captured by Basherbots and used to entertain the Galaxy Warriors audience as part of Odius' plan to brainwash the people of Earth.

In "Reaching the Nexus", Victor and Monty help evacuate the people from the Warrior Dome ship. Before escaping themselves, they threw the explosive juggling balls towards Badonna and Cosmo Royale. After Odius is destroyed, the two of them are honored by the Mayor of Summer Cove. This enabled Victor to finally win his 50th trophy.

=== Monty ===
Monty (portrayed by Caleb Bendit) is a nerd at Summer Cove High School who is often being bullied by Victor to do things for him. Monty would help Victor in his plans to become popular which often go comically awry.

In "Helping Hand", Victor and Monty's magnetic device for shop class attracting the Ninja Stars which caught the attention of a Buzzcam. While Galvanax has Madame Odius and the Basher Bots take Victor and Monty as hostages, Galvanax makes plans for the season finale of "Galaxy Warriors".

In "Galvanax Rises", Victor and Monty are roped in by Odius into building the Mega-Magnet to help her in destroying the Rangers. Both of them managed to escape and tell the news media about their survival.

In "Echoes of Evil", the two try to sell products that they used during the escape and got a lot of money and they dropped out of school claiming that they are done with it. However, the cans didn't work against Smellaphant and they were forced to give all the money back and go back to school where Principal Hastings reluctantly gave in to their demands as the check they gave her is no longer good.

In "Doom Signal", Victor and Monty win Gorrox's audition, which led to them getting captured by Basherbots and used to entertain the Galaxy Warriors audience as part of Odius' plan to brainwash the people of Earth.

In "Reaching the Nexus", Victor and Monty help evacuate the people from the Warrior Dome ship. Before escaping themselves, they threw the explosive juggling balls towards Badonna and Cosmo Royale. After Odius is destroyed, the two of them are honored by the Mayor of Summer Cove.

=== Summer Cove High School faculty ===
The following are the staff members at Summer Cove High School:

==== Principal Hastings ====
Principal Hastings (portrayed by Amanda Billing) is the strict but fair principal of Summer Cove High School. She was the one who hired Mick Kanic upon mistaking him as the new shop teacher.

==== Mrs. Finch ====
Mrs. Finch (portrayed by Claire Chitham) is a teacher at Summer Cove High School.

==== Mrs. Bell ====
Mrs. Bell (portrayed by Lori Dungey) is a secretary at Summer Cove High School.

==== Mr. Lunt ====
Mr. Lunt (portrayed by Peter Elliott) is a drama teacher at Summer Cove High School.

==== Clint ====
Clint (portrayed by Byron Coll) is a security guard at Summer Cove High School.

== Galaxy Warriors ==
=== Galvanax ===
Galvanax (voiced by Richard Simpson) is an Oni-themed alien who is the reigning champion of the popular intergalactic game show "Galaxy Warriors", where contestants battle to prove who is the mightiest warrior.

Ten years ago, he came to Earth in search of the Ninja Nexus Star, meeting opposition from ninja master Dane Romero. When Galvanax struck the Star with his naginata, its energies transformed Dane into the Red Ranger where he engaged Galvanax in battle. Unfortunately, Dane is defeated and Galvanax proceeds to absorb the Star's energies. Unwilling to let the Star fall into evil hands, Dane shatters it with his katana, separating it into six separate Ninja Power Stars before disappearing in a tremendous explosion, leaving the stars sealed within the Nexus Prism. Galvanax and his crew take Dane's son Brody captive as well as the Prism, with Galvanax vowing to remove the Ninja Stars to acquire their power.

After the Rangers get their hands on the Stars, Galvanax sends each of the contestants of Galaxy Warriors to take the stars back from them.

At the end of "Helping Hand", Galvanax gets the Rangers' Ninja Stars except for their Power Stars due to Victor and Monty's magnetic device attracting them, which caught the attention of a Buzzcam. Galvanax then has Madame Odius and the Basherbots take Victor and Monty as hostages before making plans for the season finale of "Galaxy Warriors".

In "Galvanax Rises", Galvanax puts the season finale of "Galaxy Warriors" at hand by engaging the Rangers in a final showdown. He starts by unleashing the Basherbots on the Rangers before using Victor and Monty's magnet to steal their Ninja Power Stars. While the other Rangers were captured, Brody destroyed the magnet, leaving him to fight Galvanax until Brody gets away with Mick. Galvanax and the Basherbots catch up to Brody and Mick where he demands that Brody hands over his Ninja Power Star in exchange that he won't have the Basherbots destroy his captured friends. After Brody destroys his Ninja Power Star in an attempt to keep it from falling into Galvanax' hands, both sides were surprised when the fragments formed three Red Ninja Power Stars, which resulted in Mick becoming another Red Ranger and the return of Dane Romero as the original Red Ranger. All eight Rangers then fought Galvanax until he melted all the other Ninja Stars and drank them, gaining new abilities to attack the Rangers. Galvanax orders Cosmo Royale to use the Gigantify Ray which the audience supports. Upon Galvanax being enlarged, Madame Odius activated the Mega-Magnet to attract every Ninja Steel present, including the Ninja Steel ingested by Galvanax as she reveals her motives. However, the Mega-Magnet attracts the Ninja Steel meteor, which strikes Galvanax' ship as Galvanax plans to continue destroying the Rangers. Using the Ninja Nexus Morph Final Attack, the Rangers destroy Galvanax.

=== Madame Odius ===
Madame Odius (voiced by Jacque Drew) is a kitsune-themed alien who is first seen as Galvanax's advisor until she is revealed to be the true main antagonist of the Ninja Steel seasons. She is seen to possess a hammer-like object capable of performing magical spells. She and Ripcon accompanied Galvanax where they fought Dane Romero. When he suddenly disappeared during battle, she was present when Galvanax made off with Brody.

10 years later, Odius pitched an idea to Galvanax in order to make new stars upon acquiring the Ninja Steel. Galvanax doesn't know, but Odius plots against him and had successfully obtained the Gold Ninja Power Star. She begins by doing an experiment on it in a secret room on the ship with a civilian that she captured, a country singer named Levi Weston, whom Odius captured in the same time after Levi pulled out the Gold Ninja Power Star from the Ninja Nexus Prism. However, the Astro Zord found and rescued Levi and escaped to Earth while after he took back the Gold Ninja Power Star with him to become the Gold Ninja Steel Ranger.

Odius later created a robot using Levi Weston's memories of being Aiden Romero in order to get close to the Ninja Steel Rangers' base. Upon the robot's destruction, Odius pinned the blame for its creation on Ripcon.

In "Galvanax Rises", Odius ropes in Victor and Monty into building the Mega-Magnet to help her destroy the Rangers and Galvanax. Upon Galvanax being enlarged, Odius activated the Mega-Magnet to attract every Ninja Steel present, including the Ninja Steel ingested by Galvanax as Odius reveals her motives. However, the Ninja Steel meteor is also attracted as it strikes Galvanax' ship which sends it flying far into space. However, Odius survives the unexpected meteor strike as she states that it's not over yet.

In "Echoes of Evil,” She and Cosmo Royale later encountered Sledge and Wrench, who escaped from a black hole and wanted the Ninja Super Steel Meteor in the Warrior Dome's ship. In exchange for the Ninja Super Steel Meteor, Sledge will repair the ship. Odius allows Sledge to repair the ship where she gained Badonna as a servant. She then had Cosmo Royale begin the new season of Galaxy Warriors.

When it came to the Galactic Ninjas, Odius managed to salvage Wolvermean's Ninja Medallion to further her plot. Then she salvaged Speedwing's Medallion upon his destruction. Odius tells Badonna that she has plans for them.

After Rygore's death by the Rangers, Odius claimed his medallion and she is later approached by Badonna, Venoma, and four Foxbots. She then took her Ninja Medallion, which is used with those of the other Galactic Ninjas and her Foxbots to help create her Megazord Foxatron. After defeating the Rangers' Megazords, Foxatron ran out of energy. Odius threatens Venoma, demanding an explanation for what happened. Venoma states that the Ninja Medallions just need to be recharged and by tomorrow at the same time, the Foxatron will have enough power to destroy the Rangers once and for all.

In “Outfoxed,” After Foxatron was recharged, Odius uses it to destroy Wolvermean before facing off against the Rangers. The Ninja Blaze Megazord destroys Foxatron with the Ranger Blast Final Attack, forcing Odius (who became scarred in the face) to retreat with Badonna and plan her revenge.

In "Magic Misfire" after Tynamon kidnaps Mick and brainwashes him, Odius launches her final plan that involves a brainwashed Mick building a satellite to boost the power of her mind-control device.

In "Doom Signal" despite Brax's death, Odius succeeds in her ultimate plan: using her mind control device to brainwash all the humans, including Calvin the Yellow Ranger except the others Rangers, Redbot, Victor, and Monty. She plans to use the humans as her personal army to conquer the universe.

In "Reaching the Nexus", when the Rangers thwart her mind-control plot, Odius manages to absorb the powers of the Ninja Nexus Star and assumes a Kyubi-like appearance that grants her enhanced strength, combat prowess, increased magic attacks, and endurance. Odius is no match for a whole team of those with equal powers to hers, falling in the final battle when the Rangers combine their Power Stars with the Nexus Power to bring peace to Earth.

==== Aiden Romero Robot ====
The Aiden Romero Robot (portrayed by Nick Beckwith) is an android that was created by Madame Odius via Levi Weston's memory of being Aiden Romero in order to get close to the Ninja Steel Rangers.

While Ripcon went on a rampage, the Aiden Romero Robot infiltrated the Ninja Steel Rangers' hideout, where he knocks out Mick Kanic and Redbot to steal the Ninja Steel until Levi enters. Levi fights the Aiden Romero Robot and discovers his true form underneath. The other Rangers arrive where Sarah, Preston, Calvin, and Hayley shoot the robot and its destruction enables Levi to regain his memories. Despite being the robot's maker, Odius was able to frame Ripcon for creating him by saying she has nothing left to hide.

=== Ripcon ===
Ripcon (voiced by Campbell Cooley) is a masked Goryō-themed alien swordsman with white hair who is loyal to Galvanax. He and Madame Odius accompanied Galvanax where they fought Dane Romero. When he suddenly disappeared during battle, Ripcon helped Galvanax capture with Brody who Ripcon would nickname "rat bait".

10 years later, Ripcon came to check up on Brody and Redbot to see how they are doing their job. He is also suspicious about Odius and is often fighting Brody when accompanying a "Galaxy Warriors" contestant into battle. Ripcon loses one of his horns thanks to Brody's attack in "Gold Rush" and later figured out Odius' plot that involved the Gold Ranger.

The Aiden Romero Robot has Ripcon help him cause havoc in Summer Cove so he can find the Ninja Steel Rangers' base. Brody duels with Ripcon while the Rangers fought the Basherbots. Using the Ninja Fusion Star, Brody uses the Ninja Fusion Fury Final Attack to defeat Ripcon, though he got away. Upon being given a final chance by Galvanax and being framed for being the one who held Levi Weston on his ship, Ripcon is hit with the Gigantify Ray by Cosmo Royale, who also unleashes two Skullgators to help him. The Rangers summon the Ninja Steel Megazord and the Bull Rider Megazord to help fight Ripcon and the Skullgators. The two Skullgators later fuse into a sword that Ripcon uses to fight the Megazords. Using the Fusion Star, the Rangers combined the Ninja Steel Megazord and the Bull Rider Megazord into the Ninja Fusion Zord, which separates the sword back into the two Skullgators that comprise it. Ripcon and the two Skullgators were then destroyed by the Ninja Fusion Zord Master Slash.

=== Cosmo Royale ===
Cosmo Royale (voiced by Campbell Cooley) is the ringmaster-themed game show host of "Galaxy Warriors" who commentates on the fights that are seen on "Galaxy Warriors". (Note: While Cosmo Royale's monster suit is recycled from Baron Nero from Ressha Sentai ToQger (which was not adapted into Power Rangers and came before Shuriken Sentai Ninninger), the head was replaced with one of a different design and with different expressions that he can assume by swiftly rotating it depending on his reactions.)

Outside of unleashing Buzzcams to record the fights from his top hat, making comments about the fights, and keeping an eye on the ratings, Cosmo Royale is responsible for operating the unidentified Stage Machine where the blue button activates the Gigantify Ray that would be used on a defeated contestant and the red button unleashes a Skullgator. The yellow button is revealed to send someone to Earth. Which button Cosmo Royale pushes upon the contestant's defeat depends on the unanimous vote of the Warrior Dome's audience. (Note: The audience members are actually recycled and CGI duplicated versions of Beevil and Vexacus from Power Rangers Ninja Storm, Broodwing from Power Rangers S.P.D. minus his head container, Behemoth and Necrolai from Power Rangers Mystic Force, Kamdor from Power Rangers Operation Overdrive, Jellica and Snapper from Power Rangers Jungle Fury, and Knight Bot from Power Rangers RPM as well as an alien with the head of Crazar and the body of Benglo's cyborg form.)

Cosmo Royale once used a trap in the form of the board game "Grave Robber" as seen in the titular episode in order to make the Rangers fight for their lives against defeated "Galaxy Warrior" contestants like Trapsaw, Hacktrack, Slogre, Spinferno, and two Skullgators as part of the Halloween episode of Galaxy Warriors. When Levi joined the fight against the Skullgators, Cosmo's plot was thwarted when Levi threw the board game's hourglass up into the sky as the Rangers destroyed it.

In "Galvanax Rises", Victor and Monty nearly trick Cosmo Royale into sending them off the ship while disguised as Kudabots. He eventually figured them out when he remembered that Kudabots can't talk as he and Madame Odius unleash the Basherbots on them. Cosmo Royale was disgusted when the space slop Monty ate caused him to fart a lot, enabling Victor and Monty to hit the yellow button on Cosmo Royale's stage machine to teleport off the ship. When the Ninja Steel meteor struck Galvanax' ship and sent it far into space, Cosmo Royale survived the meteor strike and then went to work for Odius.

Cosmo Royale and Odius later encountered Sledge and Wrench, who emerged from a wormhole from the "Dino Charge" reality and wanted the Ninja Super Steel Meteor stuck to the Warrior Dome. In exchange for the Ninja Super Steel Meteor, Sledge will repair the ship. After that was done, Odius plans to have Cosmo Royale begin the new season of Galaxy Warriors.

During the Rangers' final battle with Odius in "Reaching the Nexus", Cosmo Royale and Badonna were struck by explosive balls thrown by Victor and Monty which sent the Warrior Dome ship into outer space.

=== Badonna ===
Badonna (voiced by Marissa Stott) is an Aonyōbō-themed alien who was originally a prisoner on Sledge's ship, which emerged from the wormhole leading from the Dino Charge reality's previous timeline. While working to help repair the Warrior Dome ship as part of Sledge's deal to obtain the Ninja Super Steel meteor that crashed into it, Badonna secretly told Madame Odius on what Sledge plans to do with it. Odius freed Badonna from Sledge's custody after proving her loyalty and Badonna assists her in finding the Ninja Nexus Prism.

After the plot involving Game Goblin failed, Badonna tells Odius that she has booked the Galactic Ninjas to appear in the next episode of "Galaxy Warriors".

Badonna later develops a crush on Brax when he and General Tynamon join up with Odius. She is later devastated when Brax is destroyed.

During the Rangers' final battle with Odius in "Reaching the Nexus", Cosmo Royale and Badonna were struck by explosive balls thrown by Victor and Monty, which sent the Warrior Dome ship into outer space.

=== General Tynamon ===
General Tynamon (voiced by Estevez Gillespie) is a tiny Koromodako-themed general in robotic armor who came to the Warrior Dome Ship along with Brax and serve as one of Madame Odius' new associates. He gets annoyed with Badonna acting romantic around Brax to which Badonna tells him not to interfere if he doesn't want his secret leaked. Tynamon confronts the Rangers where he introduces Brax to them.

In "Happy to Be Me" after having stolen the Ninja Fusion Star during the Rangers' fight with Voltipede, Tynamon uses a spell to steal Levi's voice and then combines the Ninja Fusion Star with Odius's hammer and six Skullgators unleashed by Cosmo Royale to form Megamauler in his giant form. But the plan fails when Levi regains his voice with the help of Preston finding a spell to undo Tynamon's voice-switching spell, destroys Megamauler thanks to his new Super Star mode, and retakes the Ninja Fusion Star. After Levi defeats him, Tynamon says that he will have his revenge and retreats.

In "Magic Misfire", Madame Odius extracts Tynamon from his armor and gives him a mind control weapon to use on Mick in exchange for his true form being enlarged. While the Rangers respond to Buzzcam activity in Hill Crest Quarry that involves Brax, Tynamon sneaks into Summer Cove High School and uses Odius's weapon on Mick. As Brody is still repairing his Ninja Star, the Rangers fight Tynamon as Preston uses the Lion Fire Armor Star and Levi uses his Super Star mode. Both of Preston and Levi's attacks fail to defeat Tynamon. After Hayley destroys Tynamon's armor by shooting at its face, the general bails from the body as Cosmo Royale gets approval from Odius to use the Gigantify Ray on him. The Rangers form the Ninja Fusion Zord as Tynamon uses his staff's Toxic Tangle on them, prompting Preston to summon the Lion Fire Zord for help. Tynamon was destroyed by the Ninja Ultrazord.

=== Brax ===
Brax (voiced by Jamie Linehan) is a general with hand-like shapes on his body who came to the Warrior Dome Ship along with General Tynamon and becomes one of Madame Odius' new associates. In his first fight with the Rangers, Brax fakes being weak and retreats in order to fool the Rangers. By the next fight, Brax uses his full power on the Rangers. When the Rangers start to turn the tide against Brax, Badonna activates the Gigantify Ray and sends some Skullgators to assist Brax. After a fight with the Megazords, Brax retreats while the Skullgators are destroyed.

In "Doom Signal", Brax joins Gorrox in battle where they are both hit with the Gigantify Ray. After Gorrox is destroyed by the Ninja Ultrazord, Brax does a powerful attack on the Ninja Ultrazord and the Ninja Steel Megazord. The Rangers then form the Ninja Blaze Ultrazord to fight Brax. Brax was destroyed by the Ninja Steel Megazord and the Ninja Blaze Ultrazord.

=== Galactic Ninjas ===
The Galactic Ninjas are a team of four animal-themed wily ninjas who derive power from special ninja medallions. Each of the Galactic Warriors also wields swords in battle. The Galactic Warriors first appear in "Attack of the Galactic Warriors" where they introduce themselves to the audience of "Galaxy Warriors".

==== Wolvermean ====
Wolvermean (voiced by Jamie Linehan) is a memory-stealing Mujina-themed monster who is the leader and master of the Galactic Ninjas. He wields a Kusarigama and a shield in battle. Wolvermean is the first to go to Earth to fight the Rangers where he ambushes Hayley, Preston, and Brody and steals their memories. During his fight with the Rangers alongside the Foxbots, Wolvermean steals Sarah's memory when she throws herself in front of Calvin. Using the scarecrow technique, Calvin and Levi later steal the memory orbs from Wolvermean as Mick restores everyone's memories. Once that is done, the Rangers fight Wolvermean and the Foxbots. After taking down the Foxbots, the Rangers then fight Wolvermean and his Ninja Clone Technique. Brody then assumes his Lion Fire mode and defeats Wolvermean with the Whiplash Strike Final Attack. Thanks to a unanimous vote from the audience, Cosmo Royale uses the Gigantify Ray to make Wolvermean grow. The Rangers form the Ninja Steel Ultrazord and use the Ninja Ultrazord Blast Final Attack to defeat Wolvermean. While Madame Odius picks up Wolvermean's Ninja Medallion, Wolvermean survives the attack and retreats, stating that it's not over.

In "Outfoxed", Wolvermean was told by Venoma about what Odius is using the Ninja Medallions for and confronts her. Badonna states to Wolvermean that he can have his Ninja Medallion back if he can destroy the Rangers. He and Venoma begin their attack on the city and fight the Rangers. After Venoma retreats, Wolvermean is taken down by the Ninja Steel Slash Final Attack. Though he survives the attack and escapes, Wolvermean returns as a giant and faces off against the Ninja Blaze Megazord before Foxatron can finish recharging. After Wolvermean is disarmed of his shield, Foxatron appears and destroys Wolvermean for his failure.

==== Speedwing ====
Speedwing (voiced by Ian Hughes) is a peregrine falcon-themed monster and member of the Galactic Ninjas who is the fastest of the bunch.

In "The Need for Speed", Speedwing takes his medallion and heads to Earth, claiming that the Rangers won't see him coming. While testing her suit in order to beat the hoverboard speed record, she crashed into Speedwing as the Rangers transform. Applying his Speed Star, Speedwing moves too fast for the Rangers to attack. The Rangers work to use his own speed against him, which causes his Speed Star to fall off and he gets away. Speedwing tells Wolvermean that he'll get his Speed Star back. With footage discovered by the Cosmo Royale's Buzzcam, Speedwing is sent by Madame Odius to get it back. At the record-breaking competition, Speedwing attacks as Sarah comes clean about the use of his Speed Star in her hoverboard. The Rangers fight Speedwing until the recovered Speed Star lands on Brody's helmet. While Preston goes after Brody, the others face off against Speedwing. Thanks to a strategy by Sarah, Brody plants the broken Speed Star onto Speedwing's back, causing him to run off. The Rangers confront Speedwing and Brody takes him down with the Lion Fire Strike Final Attack. Thanks to a unanimous vote from the audience, Cosmo Royale uses the Gigantify Ray to make Speedwing grow as the Rangers form the Lion Fire Zord and the Ninja Fusion Zord. This monster was destroyed by the Lion Fire Megazord and the Ninja Fusion Zord. Odius then claims Speedwing's Ninja Medallion.

==== Rygore ====
Rygore (voiced by Charlie McDermott) is an Indian rhinoceros-themed monster and member of the Galactic Ninjas who is an expert at surprise attacks and has super-strength. In addition to his medallion that boosts his strength, he also uses a special pair of dice to create various objects to use on the Rangers, like Dice Roll #3 creating a kettle to shoot scalding liquid on the Rangers.

In the episode "Caught Red-Handed", Rygore is destroyed by the Ninja Ultrazord.

==== Venoma ====
Venoma (voiced by Aidee Walker) is a wasp-themed monster and member of the Galactic Ninjas who has poisonous charms. In the episode "Love Stings", Venoma is destroyed by the Ninja Blaze Megazord.

=== Sledge and his Crew ===
Sledge and his crew from the Dino Charge universe's former timeline somehow manage to survive the black hole and escape through the wormhole that took them into the "original Ranger Universe" and not faded away by history alteration after their past selves are destroyed, assuming there was a side effect from the wormhole that kept them from being erased. When his ship comes across the Warrior Dome ship that had been struck by the Super Ninja Steel meteor, Sledge and Wrench explore the ship and meet Madame Odius and Cosmo Royale. Sledge cuts a deal with Odius to help fix up her ship in exchange for the Super Ninja Steel meteor where he has some of his outlaws help in repairing it. Once that was done, Sledge left with the Super Ninja Steel meteor while Odius gained the service of his prisoner Badonna.

They return for one last time in "The Poisy Show" where they use the Warrior Dome for the set of Poisandra's new talk show. While Poisandra does her talk show, Sledge tells Wrench that he will get the Rangers' Power Stars. With help from Koda, the Rangers trick Sledge and Poisandra into fighting and make their escape. Before Sledge could return to Earth to recapture the Rangers, Koda left a gift for Poisandra, which turned out to be a time bomb that kills everyone aboard the Warrior Dome ship.

However, in Power Rangers Beast Morphers, Venjix/Evox revived them before the Grid Battleforce Rangers kill Poisandra, Curio, Wrench, and Fury, and after Goldar is revived as Goldar Maximus, Venjix had no more use for Sledge (or aware of his betrayal when he obliterates Lord Arcanon) and orders Goldar to kill him.

=== Lord Draven ===
Lord Draven (voiced by Rajneel Singh) is an armored samurai-themed from the Antiverse who is the main villain in "Dimensions in Danger". He wields a bow in battle and can project force fields. Madame Odius was contacted by Lord Draven to assist in the conquest of the Multiverse where he would grant her the one she lives in while he rules the other realities. Using their resources, they capture some of the Rangers in order for Lord Draven to build his Ranger Clone army. With help from Wesley, Gemma, and Koda, the Ninja Steel Rangers raid his fortress and rescue the imprisoned Rangers. When his Ranger Clone army was defeated, Lord Draven was enlarged when Odius ordered the Gigantify Ray to be activated so that he can fire the final Mega Arrow. He is destroyed by Tommy Oliver as the White Ranger with his Ninja Falconzord combined with the Rangers' laser attacks.

==== Robo Rangers ====
The Robo Rangers are robotic clones of each Power Rangers that are created by Lord Draven in his quest to conquer the Multiverse. Like the Cyborg Rangers, the Robo Rangers sport black gloves, spike shoulder armor, and boots. The Robo Rangers are destroyed by the Ninja Steel Rangers and the other Rangers that Lord Draven captured.

- Tommy Oliver (Robot Clone) - A robotic clone of Tommy Oliver created by Draven similar to Aiden Romero Robot, who captured seven Legendary Rangers (Tommy who will escape, Kat, T.J, Rocky, Antonio, Trent and Gia) for his master and is his second in command. He fights the real Tommy in Dino Thunder Black, and is destroyed by Tommy.

=== Kudabots ===
The Kudabots are Galvanax's robotic foot soldiers in kasas that are armed with yari spears and tanegashimas. Two Kudabots are known for bringing the unidentified Stage Machine onto the stage when it comes to the decision on if the contestant should be hit with the Gigantify Ray or piloting the Warrior Dome Ship.

=== Basherbots ===
The Basherbots are Galvanax's alternative robotic foot soldiers that resemble upgraded versions of the Kudabots. The Basherbots first appeared to help Stonedozer. They survived the meteor strike and then went to work for Madame Odius and met Sledge's Crew when they came on the Warrior Dome Ship.

=== Foxbots ===
The Foxbots are robotic fox-masked ninjas that work as the foot soldiers for the Galactic Ninjas. They first appear with Wolvermean in his fight with the Rangers.

Four Foxbots were later combined by a spell from Madame Odius in order to create Foxatron, which is powered by the Ninja Medallions of Wolvermean, Speedwing, Rygore and Venoma.

=== Skullgators ===
The Skullgators are Gashadokuro/alligator-themed monsters that serve as the giant foot soldiers for Galvanax. They are often dispatched to fight the Zords upon Cosmo Royale pushing the red button on the Stage Machine.

=== Buzzcams ===
The Buzzcams are fly-type cameras that are kept under Cosmo Royale's top hat. They are unleashed by Cosmo Royale to film the fights on "Galaxy Warriors".

=== Galaxy Warriors contestants ===
Galvanax would have his contestants on "Galaxy Warriors" fight each other for other people's amusements and deploy some of them to Earth to fight the Ninja Steel Rangers. Most of the contestants on "Galaxy Warriors" resemble a hybrid of a Yōkai and an item. To make a contestant grow, Cosmo Royale would hit the blue button on the Stage Machine that activates the Gigantify Ray.

- Lavagor - A robotic mathematician/instrumentation-themed swordsman monster from the Extenz System. (Note: Lavagor is a recycled version of the Venjix Virus' first body from Power Rangers RPM.)
- Korvaka (voiced by Tim Raby) - A cybernetic Chinese guardian lion-themed monster from the Ninninger Galaxy. (Note: Korvaka is a partially-repainted version of Mig's cyborg form from Power Rangers Operation Overdrive while his sword is an altered version of Benglo's sword.)
- Ripperat (voiced by Adrian Smith) - A cybernetic Kamaitachi/chainsaw-themed monster. In "The Ranger Ribbon", it is revealed that Ripperat has a twin brother named Trapsaw.
- Spinferno (voiced by Greg Ward) - A roller skating fire-elemental Kasha-themed monster who can expel fire and heat and move fast in his roller skates enough to form a tornado around them.
- Slogre (voiced by Ian Hughes) - A Kappa/fire extinguisher-themed monster who can fire a special mist that makes anyone slow.
- Tangleweb (voiced by Jamie Linehan) - A Tsuchigumo/refrigerator-themed monster who can shrink down to spider size, emit webs, make use of his extra arms, and turn into a purple vortex that consumes everything in its path.
- Badpipes (voiced by Kelson Henderson) - A Tengu/clarinet-themed monster who can make people do his every command when he plays his bagpipes. In addition to his flight and ability to extend his nose, Badpipes wields a fan that can deflect attacks and perform wind attacks.
- Hacktrack (voiced by Ian Hughes) - An Ungaikyō/antenna-themed monster who wields an antenna club that can absorb technology and shoot electrical beams. In addition, he can fly and survive in outer space.
- Stonedozer (voiced by Phil Brown) - A geokinetic Daidarabotchi/power shovel-themed monster who can cause earthquakes, burrow underground, and throw rocks.
- Trapsaw (voiced by David Van Horn) - A cybernetic Kamaitachi/chainsaw-themed monster arms who is the twin brother of Ripperat and the self-proclaimed master of traps.
- Toxitea (voiced by Yvette Parsons) - An Enenra/kettle-themed monster that is loyal to Madame Odius. In addition to firing teapot-shaped fireballs, she can brew a poison in her body that can kill the infected victim by sunset unless an antidote is administered.
- Shoespike (voiced by Rowan Bettjeman) - A one-eyed Amabie/sneakers-themed monster who has super-speed, can turn anyone into trophies, and perform shot put attacks.
- Lord Drillion (voiced by Joseph Wycoff) - A powerful Nue/toolbox-themed monster with a drill on his right arm who is a royal guard member that works for Princess Viera of the Lion Galaxy.
- Phonepanzee (voiced by Simon McKinney) - A Yamabiko/payphone-themed monster who can mimic people's voices by sampling their voices, perform a sonic boom attack, and call anyone on their phone parts.
- Cat O'Clock (voiced by Charlie McDermott) - A time-controlling Nekomata/stopwatch-themed monster.
- Abrakadanger (voiced by Murray Keane) - A magic-using Ittan-momen/carpet-themed monster who wields a magic broomstick-shaped staff which he uses to cast spells.
- Forcefear (voiced by Darren Young) - A Nurikabe/Grade crossing signals-themed monster who can form a brick wall-shaped force field and shoot lasers from his grade crossing signals parts.
- Cleocatra (voiced by Chelsea Millar) - A Mataneko/stopwatch-themed monster who is Cat O'Clock's cousin.
- Smellephant (voiced by Stephen Brunton) - A Baku/purse-themed monster who can freeze people with his eye beams and suck up anything with his trunk.
- Deceptron (voiced by Mark Wright) - A flashlight/Frankenstein's monster-themed monster whose Bolt Blaster is fueled by every lie that is told.
- Spyclops (voiced by Teuila Blakely) - A Kasa-obake/fountain pen-themed monster who can fly and shoot a barrage of ink from her fountain pen-like parts.
- Doomwave (voiced by Adrian Smith) - An Umibōzu/inflatable boat-themed monster who wields a naginata, can throw explosive dumbbells, and specialize in fighting on water.
- Game Goblin (voiced by Jamie Linehan) - An Otoroshi/lawn mower-themed monster who can fire a Controller Beam to control anyone.
- Dreadwolf (voiced by Emmett Skilton) - A werewolf-themed monster with knife-like claws. His Werewolf Claw projectiles turn anyone he strikes with them into werewolves that obey him.
- Blammo (voiced by Tarun Mohanbhai) - A Konaki-jiji/barbell-themed monster who can shoot eye beams, use parts of his body as bombs, and is a known demolition expert.
- Typeface (voiced by Andrew Faulkner) - A Mokumokuren/keyboard-themed monster who can shoot lasers from his eyes and hands and teleport with his space key.
- Voltipede (voiced by Ashton Brown) - An energy-eating Ōmukade/power strip-themed monster. Upon eating electricity, he can perform electric attacks and wrap around opponents with his centipede parts.
- Megamauler (voiced by Jeremy Birchall) - An Oboroguruma/skeleton-themed monster who uses a roller weapon when he is giant-sized.
- Gorrox (voiced by Jay Simon) - A Shuten-dōji/Nobori-themed monster who is friends with Brax and wields a kanabō in battle.

=== Gruesome Grunts ===
The Gruesome Grunts are a group of monsters who have no connections to Madame Odius and have committed crimes throughout the galaxy. They switched bodies with the Rangers to fool the Mummy Guards in orders to bring them before the Halloween Intergalactic Court. When four of the body-swapped Rangers were captured, they had to prove themselves that the Gruesome Grunts stole their body. If their meter hits the top, they will be destroyed. Thanks to a plan by Mick, they trap Versix and lure the Mummy Guards into apprehending them. Mick posed as Versix to confess as the Court Witch undoes the spell. Versix's teammates were destroyed by the Jack-o'-lantern Judges while Versix was destroyed by the Rangers.

- Versix (voiced by Jay Simon) - A magic-using Binbōgami/Christmas stocking-themed monster who is the leader of the Gruesome Grunts. He can swap the bodies of anyone and shoot a beam from his wand.
- Fangore (voiced by Stephen Brunton) - A syringe sword-wielding Count Dracula-themed monster.
- Stabberous (voiced by Emmett Skilton) - An Amikiri/Swiss Army knife-themed monster.
- Jabberon (voiced by Daisy Lawless) - A Futakuchi-onna/glasses-themed monster.
- Shelldax (voiced by Jeremy Birchall) - A basilisk/Black Tortoise-themed monster. (Note: Shelldax is a recycled version of Snapper from Power Rangers Jungle Fury.)
- Plasmora (voiced by Lauren Jackson) - A female vampire-themed monster. (Note: Plasmora is a recycled version of Necrolai from Power Rangers Mystic Force with the monster suit being the original one that was seen in Mahou Sentai Magiranger minus the butt skirt.)
- Ackshun (voiced by Gareth Williams) - A film director/cinematic props-themed monster. (Note: Ackshun is a recycled version of Zyuden Sentai Kyoryuger monster Debo Kantokku (unused in Power Rangers Dino Charge).)

=== Sledge's Outlaws ===
These are the outlaws in Sledge's possession that appear in this show:

- Snow Fright (voiced by Sarah Hart) - A Yuki-onna/Kakigōri maker-themed monster who can perform ice attacks that can trap people in snowmen.

In addition, two unnamed outlaws in Sledge's possession helped Sledge to rebuild the Warrior Dome ship for Madame Odius before Koda's bomb killed them.

- Shuriken Sentai Ninninger' monster Yokai Burburu.
- A Kuliner from Ressha Sentai ToQger.
