= Dystopian film =

Film sub-genre

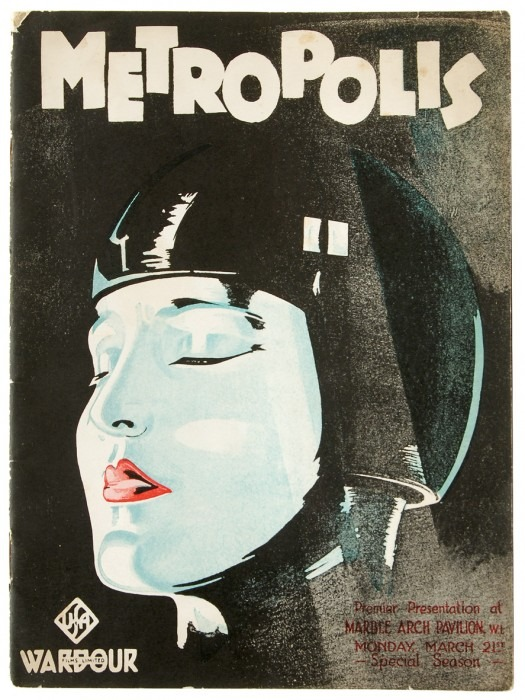
Publicity poster for Fritz Lang's 1927 film Metropolis

Dystopian is a subgenre of science fiction and political films that depicts imagined societies characterized by oppression, control, environmental degradation, and social or political instability. These films commonly explore themes of totalitarian control and the impact of political, social, or technological developments on individual autonomy.

== Characteristics ==
Dystopian films are commonly characterized by the following features:

=== Restricting freedom ===
Dystopian films involve a society that is subjected to strict surveillance and control by a dominant authority. Scholars have noted that dystopian narratives across literature and film depict citizens as subject to forced labor, indoctrination, or exploitation under authoritarian systems.

=== High-tech authoritarianism ===
Dystopian films often depict advanced technology as a tool of surveillance and social control within highly mechanized societies. This theme is illustrated in dystopian films such as The Matrix (1999) by The Wachowskis, which depicts a society dominated by technological manipulation.

=== Bureaucratic control ===
Bureaucratic control refers to the use of rigid administrative systems, hierarchical authority, and impersonal regulations as mechanisms of social control. Scholars such as Keith Booker have discussed bureaucratic control as a central feature of dystopian literature, a theme that is also commonly depicted in dystopian films such as Brazil (Gilliam 1985) and The Hunger Games (2012).

=== Rebellion and resistance ===
Dystopian narratives feature protagonists who resist oppressive social conditions and rebel against their oppressors. Such resistance may take the form of challenging the established order, exposing concealed truths, or seeking personal freedom within an oppressive society.

== History ==
=== Literary foundations and early cinema ===
The development of dystopian film is commonly traced to dystopian literature of the late nineteenth and early twentieth centuries. Works such as We (1924), Brave New World (1932), and Nineteen Eighty-Four (1949), provided the thematic and philosophical groundwork that later filmmakers would translate to the screen.

Cinematic dystopia emerged almost simultaneously with these literary developments. In the 1920s and 1930s, European filmmakers began to use visual spectacle to depict mechanized societies and the erosion of individuality. Fritz Lang's Metropolis (1927) is widely regarded as the seminal dystopian film, combining Expressionist aesthetics with social commentary on class hierarchy and industrial alienation, as discussed by film scholars such as Anton Kaes.

Commentators have noted that early works such as William Cameron Menzies's Things to Come (1936) expressed both optimism and anxiety about technology's capacity to rebuild or destroy civilization. These early examples established visual and thematic conventions that were subsequently incorporated into the film genre.

While certain literatures have influenced the concept of Dystopia as a whole, and thus the film genre, many novels and literary works have acted as the germ for the types/subgenres of dystopian stories we see today. For example, the William Gibson novel Neuromancer (1984) was a major inspiration for what would become that vast cyberpunk genre. Even being touted as the "the quintessential cyberpunk novel" , and the "archetypal cyberpunk work". Another primary example includes, Do Androids Dream of Electric Sheep? (1968) by Philip K. Dick; which was adapted into Ridley Scotts' Blade Runner (1982).

=== Key periods and movements (1950s–1990s) ===
During the Cold War era, films frequently depicted authoritarian regimes, surveillance, and nuclear threats, themes commonly associated with Cold War–era concerns. Adaptations of dystopian literature, such as 1984 (1956) and Fahrenheit 451 (1966), gained widespread attention due to their distant yet realistic settings.

The 1980s and 1990s saw the emergence of cyberpunk and technologically oriented dystopias, associated with anxieties about corporate power, computers, and urban decay. Ridley Scott's Blade Runner (1982) combined film noir aesthetics with futuristic landscapes, depicting themes related to artificial intelligence, identity, and industrialization. Terry Gilliam's Brazil satirized bureaucratic and corporate control through absurdist imagery, while films such as RoboCop (1987) and The Matrix (1999) interrogated the relationship between humanity, technology, and autonomy.

Scholars and reference sources have identified recurring motifs in dystopian films from this period, including sharp divides between wealth and poverty, oppressive state or corporate control, alienation and dehumanization of individuals, and pervasive surveillance. These core elements established a foundation for subsequent dystopian storytelling, allowing filmmakers to explore contemporary social fears through imaginative futuristic scenarios.

=== Recent developments ===
In the 21st century, dystopian film has experienced renewed popularity, a trend commentators have linked to contemporary concerns such as climate change, social inequality, mass surveillance, global crises, and the increasing influence of digital technologies.

Films and series often depict near-future or alternate societies where the consequences of environmental degradation, economic disparity, or algorithmic governance are dramatized, illustrating individual and collective responses to oppressive social conditions. Notable examples include Children of Men (2006), which explores societal collapse and global infertility, and the Hunger Games series (2012–2015), which popularized dystopian narratives for younger audiences while highlighting themes of social stratification and authoritarian control.

Anthology series such as Black Mirror (2011) continue to examine the ethical and psychological implications of technology, reflecting current concerns about privacy, surveillance, and the dehumanizing potential of digital networks.

== Types ==
Dystopian fiction explores oppressive societies, typically characterized by profound human misery, poverty, oppression, and fear. Within this broad genre, several types of dystopia genres have emerged, each focusing on a distinct source of societal control, technological advancement, or environmental change.

=== Cyberpunk ===
Cyberpunk is defined by its "high-tech, low-life" aesthetic.

- Focus: It centers on worlds where highly advanced technologies, such as cybernetics and artificial intelligence, coexist with profound social decay and poverty. Key themes include social stratification, alienation, blurred boundaries between human and machine, and critiques of corporate capitalism.
- Governance: Governance is frequently dominated by massive, monolithic corporations megacorps that hold immense political and economic power, often exceeding that of traditional governments.
- Key Example: Blade Runner (1982) established core visual and thematic elements of the subgenre, including neon-lit urban environments and corporate dominance.

=== Post-apocalyptic dystopia ===
This subgenre combines dystopian elements with the aftermath of a major catastrophe.

- Focus: The landscapes are fundamentally shaped by a preceding disaster, such as global war, a catastrophic ecological collapse, or a widespread pandemic. The new society is harsh, arising from the struggle for survival.
- Governance: The dystopia is not necessarily centralized, but rather fragmented and localized, based on the immediate control of scarce resources.
- Key Example: A frequently cited literary example is The Road by Cormac McCarthy.

=== Biopunk ===
Image of Ethan Hawke from the film Gattaca, overlaid with sequences of the four Nucleotide bases of DNA.

Biopunk concentrates on the ramifications of biological and genetic manipulation.

- Focus: It explores genetic engineering, biotechnology, and synthetic biology, evolving as a subgenre from cyberpunk in the 1980s. Central themes include the ethical controversies surrounding genetic modification, biological surveillance, and the resulting class divisions based on genetic makeup.
- Governance: Societies are frequently controlled by powerful biotech corporations or scientific entities that use biotechnologies as a means of social control and economic power.
- Key Example: Gattaca is a film about a society driven by eugenics, where children are given the best genes from their parents.

=== Social dystopia ===
Social dystopia focuses on systemic human control and societal failings rather than purely technological or environmental ones.

- Focus: This category centers on the direct mechanisms of societal breakdown, oppressive social control, or extreme inequality enforced by a powerful regime or ideology.
- Governance: The source of the dystopia is often the totalitarian state itself, which uses techniques like thought control and mass surveillance to maintain power.
- Key Example: Foundational works defining this genre include Nineteen Eighty-Four by George Orwell.

=== Ecological dystopia ===
This subgenre centers the dystopian premise around environmental catastrophe and its social fallout.

- Focus: It explores worlds where natural resources have been depleted, the environment is severely polluted, or climate change has fundamentally altered human civilization. Common themes include resource scarcity, and the consequences of unsustainable human development.
- Governance: The dystopia is driven by the struggle to manage the remaining environmental resources, leading to rationing, control, and vast inequality.
- Key Example: WALL-E (2008) is a widely cited eco-dystopia where Earth is abandoned after extreme pollution and corporate overconsumption.

== Regional Dystopian Films ==
=== Asia ===
Scholars have identified recurring concerns in Asian dystopian cinema related to modernization, collectivist values, and political authoritarianism. One prominent theme is "techno-Orientalism," the concept of Asia depicted as a hyper-technological, alienating 'other' in Western dystopian science fiction, as explored in works by David S. Roh, Betsy Huang, and Greta A. Niu (2015), who note that films like Blade Runner (1982) and Ghost in the Shell (2017) use Asian motifs as backdrops for Western anxieties, often displacing local Asian subjectivities. Similarly, Morley and Robins (1995) argue that such depictions reinforce binaries of the West and East, as well as progress and peril.

In contrast, indigenous Asian dystopian films engage deeply with local social realities and anxieties. Japanese cinema, notably Akira (1988) and Battle Royale (2000), reflects postwar trauma and urban alienation, which scholars have interpreted as allegorical engagements with bureaucratic control and technological power. South Korean entries, such as Snowpiercer (2013) and Train to Busan (2016), as well as streaming series like Squid Game (2021) and Hellbound (2021), foreground issues of class division, economic precarity, and the legacy of authoritarian regimes. Scholars have noted that these films reflect "glocal" (global-local) synthesis—adopting global genre conventions while reworking them for distinct cultural and historical contexts.

In mainland China, dystopian and near-future science fiction films, such as The Wandering Earth (2019) and Crazy Alien (2019), present allegorical narratives about collective action, modernization, and environmental crisis. Hu, Ismail, and Wang argue that such narratives employ controlled social systems and apocalyptic scenarios as allegorical frameworks for debates over social stability and governance.

=== Europe ===
European dystopian cinema is shaped by the continent's historical experiences of fascism, socialism, and post-industrial decline. European dystopian films have emphasized social disintegration, surveillance, and institutional decline. Scholars argue that dystopian settings allow European filmmakers to reflect on the instability of modern societies and the lingering effects of political authoritarianism. These films commonly engage with Europe's contemporary crises, such as economic austerity, migration, and ecological anxiety, which scholars have associated with themes of control and resistance.

Across Europe, dystopian films merge realism and allegory, situating their critiques within familiar urban and domestic spaces. Lidia Meras notes that European filmmakers often portray technologically mediated societies as emotionally detached and morally unstable, as seen in Renaissance (2006) and Metropia (2009). Erdinç Yilmaz argues that works such as Ben Wheatley's High-Rise (2015) reinterpret ordinary environments as sites of ideological tension.

=== Oceania ===
Australian dystopian film is discussed in relation to the nation's history of colonialism, landscape, and anxiety over isolation and lawlessness. Academic sources, notably Rayner's influential work on Australian Gothic cinema, argue that films like George Miller's Mad Max series and David Michôd's The Rover (2014) have been analyzed as employing apocalyptic landscapes to depict themes of societal collapse and environmental degradation. These films subvert the triumphalism found in many American counterparts. Rayner characterizes these settings as "bleak, sunlit Australian spaces," emphasizing themes of institutional failure.

Beyond apocalyptic narratives, Australian dystopian cinema is also examined through its use of spatial tension and social fragmentation. Rayner identifies films such as Wake in Fright (1971) and Picnic at Hanging Rock (1975) as employing ambiguous rural settings to foreground uncertainty and disrupted social order. Contemporary works, including These Final Hours (2013) and Cargo (2017), further develop these motifs, which West and Jackson note reflect broader trends in Australian speculative film.

In New Zealand, films such as The Quiet Earth (1985) have been discussed in scholarship for their exploration of scientific failure, societal disruption, and altered environments. Gildersleeve and Cantrell note that later films such as The Locals (2003) and The Dead Lands (2014) incorporate temporal or cultural discontinuities, situating them within Gothic and speculative frameworks that intersect with dystopian themes.

=== North America ===
North American dystopian cinema has been examined in relation to Cold War themes, technological change, and institutional authority. Booker identifies films such as Blade Runner (1982) and Escape from New York (1981) as examples of early U.S. dystopian works that incorporate concerns about surveillance, urban decline, and state power. Telotte notes that these films contributed to establishing dystopia as a recurring framework in U.S. science fiction cinema.

By the late twentieth century, dystopian films in the United States had begun to address corporate influence, digital systems, and automation. Academic studies discuss RoboCop (1987) and The Matrix (1999) as depictions of governance shaped by technology and corporate power. Seed identifies these films as part of a broader trend in which dystopian narratives incorporate economic and technological frameworks central to contemporary science fiction.

Canadian dystopian cinema is characterized by its focus on confinement, systems of control, and mediated environments. King's analysis of Videodrome (1983) outlines how Canadian science fiction employed media technologies as structural elements within dystopian settings. Bould describes Cube (1997) as a representative example of minimal-setting dystopia, which Bould describes as using spatial restriction to represent impersonal bureaucratic systems.

== Effects of Dystopian Films ==
=== Psychological and Emotional Effects ===
Scholars have identified recurring themes in dystopian narratives, including technological advancement, climate change, and socio-political instability.

==== Catharsis and Release ====
Kholia has described dystopian films as providing a form of cathartic experience, drawing an analogy with classical tragedy in literature.

=== Political Attitudes and Behavior ===
==== Social Critique and Resistance ====
Some scholars interpret dystopian films as cautionary narratives that extrapolate contemporary social trends, highlighting risks associated with unchecked power, corporate dominance, and social inequalities.

==== Developing Social Consciousness ====
Educators have discussed using dystopian narratives to engage students with themes including climate change, terrorism, and gender inequality.

=== Economic Attitude and Critique ===
==== Critique of Hypercapitalism and Inequality ====
Dystopian media frequently depict extreme income and wealth inequalities as a core feature of the oppressive society. Films like Elysium (2013) and the Hunger Games series (2012–2015) offer exaggerated representations of material scarcity for the majority alongside immense, concentrated wealth for a ruling elite.

==== The Problem of Scarcity and Abundance ====
The genre consistently portrays post-apocalyptic worlds of scarcity, where conflicts over limited resources (water, food, fuel) drive social unrest and the lack of an effective rule of law. Conversely, some narratives critique consumer-driven capitalism by imagining a world where the market has fulfilled the promise of material abundance but resulted in a nightmarish, consumerist dystopia, like the lazy, technology-dependent future in Wall-E (2008), which critiques rampant consumerism and resource mismanagement.

==== Technological Determinism and Labor ====
Dystopian narratives often explore how unchecked technological advancements affect labor, economics, and human value.

== See also ==
- List of apocalyptic films
- Lists of science fiction films
- Dystopia
- Utopia
- Science fiction film
- Cyberpunk
- Biopunk
- Steampunk
- Social science fiction
- Speculative fiction
- Apocalyptic and post-apocalyptic fiction
- Utopian and Dystopian fiction
