= Hamilton Underground Film Festival =

The Hamilton Underground Film Festival was an annual film festival held in Hamilton, New Zealand between 2006 and 2013. Run on the basis of a DIY ethos the festival was open to all and had no admission fee for film entries. Each entrant received a DVD which contains all the entered films. The festival was the longest running festival of its kind in Australasia until recent usurped by the Melbourne underground film festival.

There was a yearly section for experimental fone films, Super 8 mm film and subverts. Since 2009 the festival featured a collaborative digital film section in which participants operate under the same name: Karen Karnak There is also a special remix section where films can be entered under a Attribution-Noncommercial-Share Alike 3.0 Unported creative commons licence. This will allow other contributors to remix selected works and create collaborative works.

== History ==
The Hamilton Underground Film Festival was a yearly event showcasing national and international underground film presented in Hamilton, New Zealand. It was founded in 2006 by the Otatoe Collective under the guidance of Emit Snake-Beings. and has since been gathering momentum with over 100 filmmakers featured and linked events in Catalonia, Spain, Kingston upon Hull, and London.

The 2010 featured a talk and presentation by Jed Town from Fetus products. The 2009 event: local films plus a director's talk by David Blyth the New Zealand alternative filmmaker. The 2008 event featured a live internet link to the Priorat region of Catalonia where the simultaneous 4th Hamilton Underground Film Festival was hosted by Oscar Hidalgo. The 2008 screenings included: Director Campbell Cooley and his film The Heist, expanded cinema from the Parasitical Fantasy Band - as featured in otherfilm festival Brisbane 2006 and Greg Locke's robot band The Trons.

Poster Design by Emit Snake-Beings for the 2009 HUFF

Poster Design by Emit Snake-Beings for the 2008 HUFF

== Karen Karnak ==
The festival have created an open source multiple-use name called Karen Karnak. The name is available for anyone to create work under and there will be a special section in the festival for work by Karen Karnak. The aim of the multiple-use name Karen Karnak is to examine the space with surrounds the filmmaker and to create visual work from the emptiness or more accurately the Shunyata.

== Films and filmmakers ==
HUFF 2008

Watching. Martin Rumsby (:59)
San Antoni. Arnolfini ( 5:38)
The Trons Snake-Beings ( 2:40)
Symbol Gerard Gil ( :10)
Cyclic Existence Bonnie Hart ( :23)
Shall I be Mother. Dan Inglis ( 2:26)
Between the Lines. Christian Parahi ( 4:43)
Cholera Clocks. Snake-Beings ( 4:55)
Barbie Buddah Nylstoch ( :41)
Symbol Gerard Gil ( :10)
Blue Tide, Black Water Eve Gorden & Sam Hamilton ( 9:04)
Ensalada de Ruido Yolanda Cañardo Galve ( 1:01)
Bugged Otatoe C ( :10)
Moth Campbell Farquhar ( 4:11)
NZ es el culo Octpob ( :10)
Zaks Cake Octpob ( :48)
Solstici Gerard Gil ( 2:01)
Sintaxis B. Ferrando ( 2:23)
Ehen: el horizonte está nublado Javi Neiro and Océ Anos ( 2:35)
Symbol Gerard Gil ( :10)
Passion. Peter Caldwell ( 4:53)
Suspect device Octpob ( :03)
Ufo Jed Town ( 4:24)
The Heist Campbell Cooley ( 6:21)
Plastic Gods OctoC ( :16)
Pareidolia No Mendacity, Witcyst ( :21)
Grey News, Nylstoch ( :27)
Tinkernicks Mike Crook & Rosie Percival ( 2:51)
Al Final De La Via Gerard Gil ( 6:00)
Monk Carlos Pla ( 4:14)
Poeticas 3 B. Ferrando ( 3:24)
The Remote Viewers 2008 Snakebeings ( 13:39)
Car wash Pippa Russel ( 2:02)
American Sketch Book Martin Rumsby ( 7:55)
Night out with the artists Jenny Spark ( 4:37)
OKOK+circuit47 ( 1:50)
Petroquimica ( 1:58)
Sadie Wrestling Bryce Galloway ( 3:29)
Cuts from Rafel Marcos (1:17)
Untitled Otatoe ( 0:11)
Self Portrait as a Painter RG Shaw (3:11)
Pig in a Can CJ Finlayson ( 4:23)
Cube Hamilton street theatre collective ( 2:04)
Best of both worlds Thom Burton ( 2:34)
400 Mr Slepica ( 1:00)
Tria Prima Arnolfini ( 2:04)
Think Agent Bulldog ( 4:19)
Dios los Crean ( :03)
Abject leader Nylstoch ( :45)
Youyou RG Shaw_Mr_Slepica ( 6:04)
La Resposta de les Meves Sabates Yolanda Cañardo Galve (:59)

HUFF 2007

1. Rat Spag OTATO 28s
2. Burning Ears - Rosie Percival 02m 45s
3. Mind Your Eyes - Dan Inglis 05m 07s
4. Punk Shane Was my Hero – Mike Heynes - 02m 33s
5. Captain Al Meets the Gannets - James Finlayson 02m 27s
6. Dirty Old Eric - Bryce Galloway/Adrian Webclaw/+(Music WC4) 07m 36s
7. Croquette Blood - Octpob Films 37s
8. PUMKIN SOUP -Snakebeings 02m 21s
9. CARBON- Justin Taulu 03m 23s
10. Takipu – Adrienne Grant 02m 52s
11. 1985 - James Finlayson 03m 00s
12. Greg's Veg - Bird Song Recordings 02m 53s
13. Falamte Def - Carlos Pla 01m 30s
14. Steven Stanley's Revenge – Dave Normal 05m 25s
15. Freeks Formuler - James Robinson (Music WC4) 03m 21s
16. The Remote Viewers II- Snakebeings 04m 08s
17. Rough and Tumble – Michelle Savill 05m 01s
18. Plastic – Dave Michael / Octpob Films 03m 18s
19. The Maggots have the Advantage – Luminous Press 03m 38s
20. The Hit - Campbell Cooley 06m 50s
21. Menu Masters of Doom _ Otato Subvert 09s
22. Cup Cake - Rosie Percival 2m 00s
23. Track- Richard Ororke BSR 5m 54s
24. Tate Modern – Jessica Boyd 08m 44s
25. CARBON part three - Justin Taulu 02m 49s
26. Beach Bingo Trailer – Mike Heynes 54s
27. 100volt system – Octpob Films 02m 00s
28. Water Trap – Otato 28s
29. Cocky Two - Richard Tuhoy 06m 56s
30. POUREWA Maree Mills 03m 11s
31. Acquired Vision - Phil Secrist 08m 55s
32. The Reality of Dreams - Sten 02m 59s
33. 12pt with as - Dave mike 02m 17s
34. Take Two – Chris Thompson 02m 30s
35. What You Watching - Azric Bowater 05m 07s
36. Dukkha - Antonia Lema 08m 22s
37. Open Your Heart – Witsyst 23s
38. Open Your Heart II– Witsyst 02m 42s
39. Warpt - Nz Webits and Dave Normal 05m 00s
40. Eye –I - Aye - Martin Rumsby 08m 24s
41. Toxic Waste Toddler Trailer – Mike Heynes 02m 29s
42. I Thought You Were Good Paul - Witsyst 07m 05s

HUFF 2006

MICHELLE SAVILL – former WINTEC student presents her film ‘Martin and Snakes go to the Zoo’ fresh from the New York International Independent Film Festival. Martin and Snakes are, of course, Martin Webclaw formerly of the band Wendyhouse and intermedia artist Emit Snake-Beings.

JOE CITIZEN's recent computer scratch film with sound by Emit Snake-Being

MARTIN RUMSBY – New Zealand's experimental filmmaker, disappeared into Chicago's African American ghetto in 1995 shortly after co-founding X FILM CHICAGO. Long considered Missing in Action, Rumsby moved to Hamilton a few months ago where he has completed six films this year. Rumsby's short film LIVE challenges the authority of media representations and includes references to the war in Iraq. This will be the first public screening of a Martin Rumsby film in New Zealand since 1984. Rumsby also recently completed a film on the demise of the OVERLANDER passenger train service between Auckland and Wellington.

EMIT SNAKE-BEINGS – Founder of the Hamilton Underground Film Festival, composer, musician and electrical shrine maker, travelled in Europe for 12 years shooting films in Spain, Mexico, Fiji and Japan. Resident in Hamilton since 2000. Emit Snake-Beings will present his recently made stop frame puppet animation ‘Death of an Orchestra’

PIPSIX – Shows her 4 minute long film ‘Rabbit and Possum’ in which two common pests go fishing and drink beer together.

American filmmaker PHIL SECRIST's film MOMENTO MORI (2006) is a dark, surrealistic journey into death and time in which a man relives his life; certain doors open and close, leading him to his ultimate destination. Filmed in Hamilton.

The vision of Auckland-based musician and filmmaker THOM BURTON, of the band Yokel Ono, is a random collection of shorts, including GREEN EYED MONSTERS and LE PESTSE, which mix suburban fantasy and nightmare.

ROSIE PERCIVAL's film Fellow is a 2 minute long experimental film using Adobe After Effects and featuring identical twins having a short conversation.

STEFAN NEVILLE / SUGAR JON / PUMICE – Ex Hamiltonian, now international noise music innovator – Stefan, a musical associate of Chris Knox and currently touring the US, and Sugar Jon chop wood in Dunedin to the raw sounds of Pumice-raft. (4 minutes.)

WITCYST – Internationally known noise magician from Whangarei has released over 700 tapes and 400 CDs, who is now working in visuals as well.

OCTPOB FILMS – miscellaneous New Zealand short films.

OKOK SOCIETY – A selection of scenes by mysterious film and sound Kaosmagician Mark Reeve sent directly to us from his base in Wales.

STEVE RIFE – USA Pyrotechnics expert and filmmaker from St. Paul, Minnesota

PATRICK MAUN - USA

OTATO COLLECTIVO – INTERNATIONAL/LOCAL collaborations and network group

== See also ==
Interview with Jed Town

- Microcinema
- No Wave Cinema
- Remodernist Film
- Cinema of Transgression
- Grupo Cine Liberación, an Argentine film movement
- No budget film
- Chicago Underground Film Festival
- New York Underground Film Festival
- Lausanne Underground Film and Music Festival
- Boston Underground Film Festival
- New Haven Underground Film Festival
