= Mrs Bracegirdle's Woodlyn Park Adventure =

- Created by: Campbell Cooley
- Starring: Lori Dungey
- Country of origin: New Zealand

Production
- Producer: Lori Dungey, Campbell Cooley
- Running time: 20 minutes

Original release
- Release: 2007

Mrs. Bracegirdle's Woodlyn Park Adventure is a comedic documentary about a motel park in Waitomo, New Zealand, rated by Lonely Planet as one of the top ten most unusual accommodations in the world. Of the various lodgings visitors can choose, there is a 1950s rail car, a rare patrol boat from World War II, a Bristol Freighter and The Shire from The Lord of the Rings.

The film was birthed out of a request by Lori Dungey for Campbell Cooley to make a film for her to give to fans at the RingCon, a German The Lord of the Rings convention she would be attending in 2007. Campbell agreed to do it with the understanding that the film have a Broadway theatre-style, musical number. He directed the film in a quirky style to reflect the character of the park and its creator, Billy Black (also known as 'Barry Woods').

The film was only submitted to the Magma Short Film Festival in Rotorua, New Zealand in 2007 where it won Runner-up to the Grand Prize (awarded to 'Run').

A sequel (Mrs Bracegirdle's Journey to Sanctuary) was completed in September 2008.

A third film (Mrs Bracegirdle's Adventures in Therapy) is currently being made and expected to be completed in September 2009.

== Current characters ==
Character	Actor
Mrs. Bracegirdle	Lori Dungey
Barry Woods	Billy Black
'The Director'	Campbell Cooley
