= Lise Baldwin =

Canadian actress and model

- Born: May 26, 1970; Canada
- Occupation: Film & Television actress

Lise Baldwin (born May 26, 1970) is a Canadian actress and model currently residing in New Zealand. She is also a public speaker on disability issues.

== Film roles ==
- Broken Hallelujah(2009) - Sarah
- The Raffle (1994) - Beauty Entrant

== Television roles ==
- Power Rangers: Jungle Fury (2008) – TV Reporter (2 episodes)

== Short film roles ==
- Operator (2011) - Abigail
- Munted (2010) - Brooke
- The Therapy Session (2009) - The 60s Diva
- In the Privacy of My Room (2009) - Mum
- Tea & Biscuits (2009) - Mother
- Nature, Nurture, Intrinsic (2009) - Joanne
- The Minute Men (2008)- Dr. Kerry Post
- The Heist – Director - Campbell Cooley (2008) – Mother
- The Singing Surgeon (2007) - Nurse Barbie
- The Agent (2006) - Suzanne
- Down To Zero (1993) - Feather
- Uncle Joseph (1993) - Dr. Rafington

=== Other ===
- Weeds Promo DVD (2007) – Voiceover & Live Performance
- Numerous TVCs - Coldwell Banker; Telecom; The Warehouse; CMC Markets; KFC; Liquorland; etc.
- Various Presenting roles - Live and for TV
