= Harry Sinclair =

New Zealand film director, writer, actor (born 1959)

- Born: Harry Alan Sinclair; 1959 (age 66–67); Auckland, New Zealand
- Education: École Philippe Gaulier
- Occupations: Film director; writer; actor
- Years active: 1987–present
- Known for: Playing Isildur in The Lord of the Rings: The Fellowship of the Ring

Harry Alan Sinclair (born 1959) is a New Zealand film director, writer and actor. In his early career he was an actor and member of The Front Lawn, a musical theatre duo. He went on to write and direct several short films, a TV series and three feature films. He is best known for his role as Isildur in the first scenes of Peter Jackson's The Lord of the Rings: The Fellowship of the Ring.

== Early life ==
Harry Sinclair was born in 1959 in Auckland, New Zealand. He is the son of historian Keith Sinclair and brother of writer Stephen Sinclair.

Sinclair studied acting at the Ecole Philippe Gaulier in Paris, and went on to a career on the stage in Auckland, as well as roles in a number of New Zealand films including working with Peter Jackson, playing the role of Roger in Braindead and Isildur in The Lord of the Rings.

== Career ==
=== The Front Lawn ===
In 1985 he co-founded The Front Lawn (with Don McGlashan), a multi-media comedy music duo. Sinclair and The Front Lawn toured internationally with a series of live shows including: Songs and Stories from The Front Lawn, The Reason for Breakfast, The Washing Machine, and The Story of Robert. They also completed two music albums, Songs from The Front Lawn and More Songs from The Front Lawn. They performed twice at the Edinburgh Festival, in 1988 and 1989, winning The Independent newspaper's theatre award for the festival in 1988, and in both years winning inclusion in the "Pick of the Fringe" season at London's Donmar Warehouse.

The Front Lawn also toured extensively in Europe, America, Australia and New Zealand.

Sinclair and McGlashan made several short films: The Lounge Bar (which was featured in the First Annual International Festival of Short Films in the U.S. as one of the "world's best live-action shorts"), Walk Short and Linda’s Body (which won Best Short Film at the New Zealand Film Awards).

=== Films ===
After The Front Lawn disbanded in 1990, Sinclair directed two short films, Casual Sex, and Avenue Du Maine.

Sinclair's first feature film Topless Women Talk About Their Lives (1997), starring Danielle Cormack and Joel Tobeck, was released theatrically in 23 countries and won nine awards at the New Zealand Film Awards including Best Director and Best Film. It was a spin-off from his TV series of the same name, which was shown on TV3 in New Zealand and on SBS in Australia. Each of the 41 episodes was only 4 minutes long, and featured a different song from Flying Nun Records.

His second feature, The Price of Milk (2000), starring Danielle Cormack and Karl Urban, was his only film to be released in the US, by Lot 47 Films. It won the Grand Prize at the Puchon International Fantastic Film Festival (2001) and the Grand Prize at the Tokyo International Fantastic Film Festival (2001).

His third feature was Toy Love (2002) starring Dean O'Gorman and Kate Elliott.

His three feature films were made in an unconventional manner, with Sinclair casting his lead actors before writing the scripts. The stories were developed during video workshops with the actors, and the final scripts written during the shoots, allowing the stories to develop organically, building on what naturally developed between the actors.

=== Television ===
In 2009 and 2010, he was a regular director of the TV series 90210.

=== The Builders Association ===
From 2006 to 2008 Sinclair collaborated with the New York-based theatre company Builders Association, touring internationally as an actor in their production Super Vision. He co-wrote their next production, Continuous City, which premiered in November 2008 at the Brooklyn Academy of Music, and toured through 2010. He also played a lead role in Continuous City, appearing only in projected film sequences.

=== Kiri and Lou ===
Sinclair is currently writing and directing an animated children's series, Kiri and Lou, for Television New Zealand and the Canadian Broadcasting Corporation. He is collaborating with animation director Ant Elworthy and composer Don McGlashan, and the series is produced by Fiona Copland.

== Personal life ==
Sinclair lives in Los Angeles.

== Filmography ==
Year	Film	Role	Production company
1987	Walk Short	Lead	Front Lawn Films
1989	The Lounge Bar	Lead	Front Lawn Films
1990	Linda's Body	Lead	Front Lawn Films
1992	Braindead	Roger	WingNut Films
1997	The Footstep Man	Seskau	Hibiscus Films
2001	The Lord of the Rings: The Fellowship of the Ring	Isildur	WingNut Films
2003	The Lord of the Rings: The Return of the King	Isildur	WingNut Films
2012	Lego The Lord of the Rings	Isildur	TT Games
