= Emit Snake-Beings =

British/New Zealand writer, visual and sound artist

Dr Emit Snake-Beings
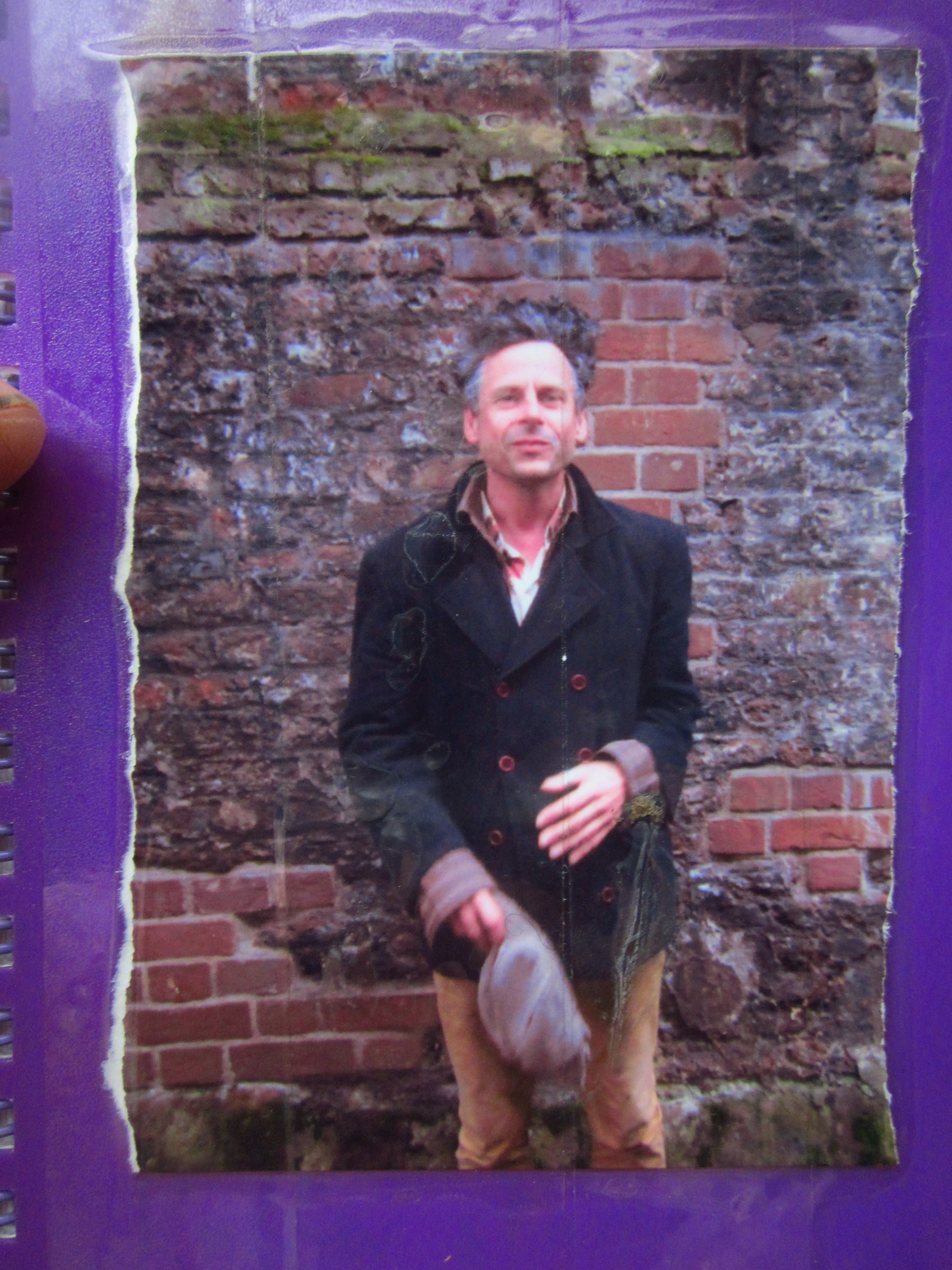
- Snake Beings
- Born: London
- Known for: Collaborative media production, Maker culture, Hackerspace Film, Video ethnography, DIY technology, Photography, Sculpture, DIY audio, DIY ethos, Visual arts, Writing, Intermedia, Sound art, Open-design movement
- Website: www.snakebeings.org

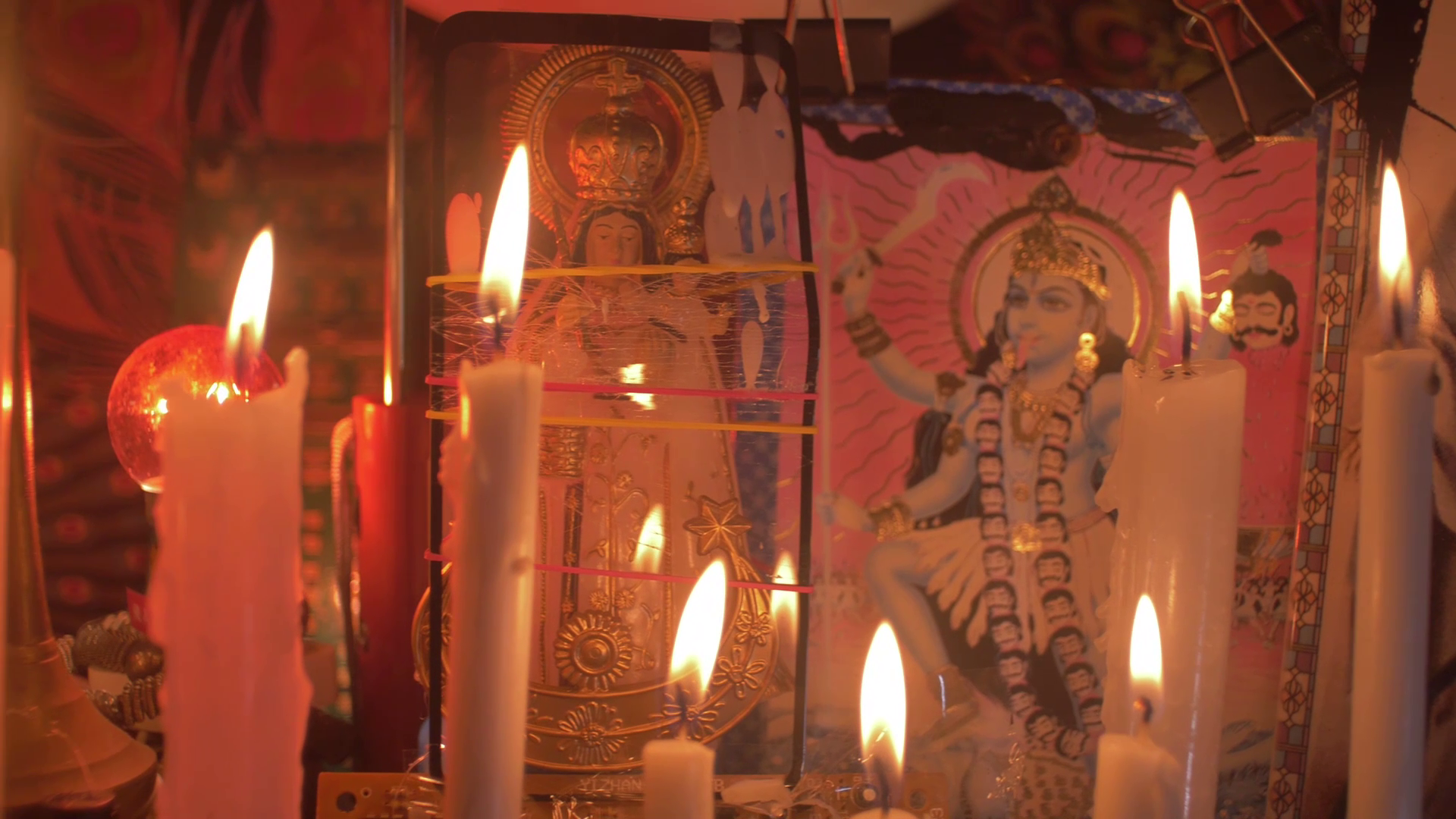
Still from the Creative Ethnography Network series of video documentaries made by SnakeBeings

Emit Snake-Beings (also known as Snakebeings) is a British/New Zealand writer multi-media visual artist and sound artist who has also worked in kinetic art, DIY ethos, DIY technology, sculpture, cinematography, and video editing. He has a master's degree from the University of Waikato, and in 2016 was awarded a PhD, entitled The DiY ['Do it yourself'] Ethos: A participatory culture of material engagement for his work linking the DIY ethic and Maker culture with contemporary theory of material agency and Material culture. Recent publications have focused on developing an idea of techno-animism and ethnographic studies of technology.

== Biography ==
=== Early life ===
Born in the Royal Free hospital in Islington, London, Emit and his sister Bella Basura were moved by their parents to the new town of Welwyn Garden City. At the age of 20, after studying art and design at the University of Hertfordshire he moved to London to pursue a career in art, where he lived and worked in Hackney, London between the years 1987 and 1998. During this time he encountered diverse influences, including artist cooperatives, lo-fi music, underground film, outsider art, Cabaret Voltaire circuit bending art collectives, installations using found material, and site-specific installation art. In 1998 Emit moved to New Zealand, continuing to work with multi-media projects including street theatre and the organisation of a 13-piece Free improvisation orchestra called The Kaosphere orchestra. In 2006 he founded the Hamilton Underground Film Festival and created Karen Karnak, an invented multiple-use pseudonym under which multiple filmmakers could participate.

Portrait of Karen Karnak – private collection of the author

== Published works ==
- Avoiding the (Tourist) Gaze: Pursuit of the ‘Authentic’ in the Tbilisi Edgelands. (2021)
- DiY (Do-it-Yourself) Electronics, Coin-operated Relic Boxes & Techno-animist Shrines (2021)
- The Quiet Earth: Re-functioning Socio-material Knowledge In The Crisis of Pandemic (2020)
- The Liquid Midden: A Video Ethnography of Urban Discard in Boeng Trabaek Channel, Cambodia (2020)
- Learn to Spot the Dangerous Wanderings of a Maker Mind (2020)
- DIY (do-it-yourself) Postdisciplinary Knowledge (2019)
- Animism and Artefact: The entangled Agencies of a DIY [Do-It-Yourself] Maker (2018)
- DiY (Do-it-Yourself) pedagogy: a future-less orientation to education (2018)
- Community of difference: the liminal spaces of the Bingodisiac Orchestra (2017)
- Maker Culture and DiY technologies: re-functioning as a Techno-Animist practice (2017)
- The Do-it-Yourself (DiY) craft aesthetic of The Trons − Robot garage band (2017)
- It's on the tip of my Google: Interactive performance and the non-totalising learning environment (2017)
- The DiY ['Do it yourself'] Ethos: A participatory culture of material engagement (2016)
- Trash aesthetics and the sublime: Strategies for visualising the unrepresentable within a landscape of refuse (2015)
- DiY participatory culture: Allowing space for inefficiency, error and noise (2014)
- From ideology to algorithm: the opaque politics of the internet (2013)
- The construction of Karen Karnak: The multi-author function (2013)
- The construction of Karen Karnak: The multi-author-function (2010)
- Orchid ID

== Films ==
One of the Snake-Beings's first films made was The Shrine (1993) which began as a documentation of the creation, display and destruction of four Shrines made during a journey through Holland and Spain lasting over 6 months between 1990 and 1991. Three nomadic shrines were eventually made during this time, each dedicated to a different element, with the fourth air shrine being the film itself. The first three shrines were destroyed but the super 8mm film, which documented the process, was preserved and exhibited in a series of underground film festivals including the exploding cinema in summer 1993. The preservation of The Shrine led to the beginning of a series of coin-operated shrines, which are described below, as well as the beginning of several super 8mm films. Santa Arson (1995), filmed on super 8mm, was made with Steve Rife, a pyrotechnics artist from Saint Paul, Minnesota.

A later film The Remote Viewers (2008) examines the connection between technology, the mass media and magic. The synopsis from Snakebeings website provides a clue into some of the seemingly random imagery of which the film seems comprised.

== Selected filmography ==
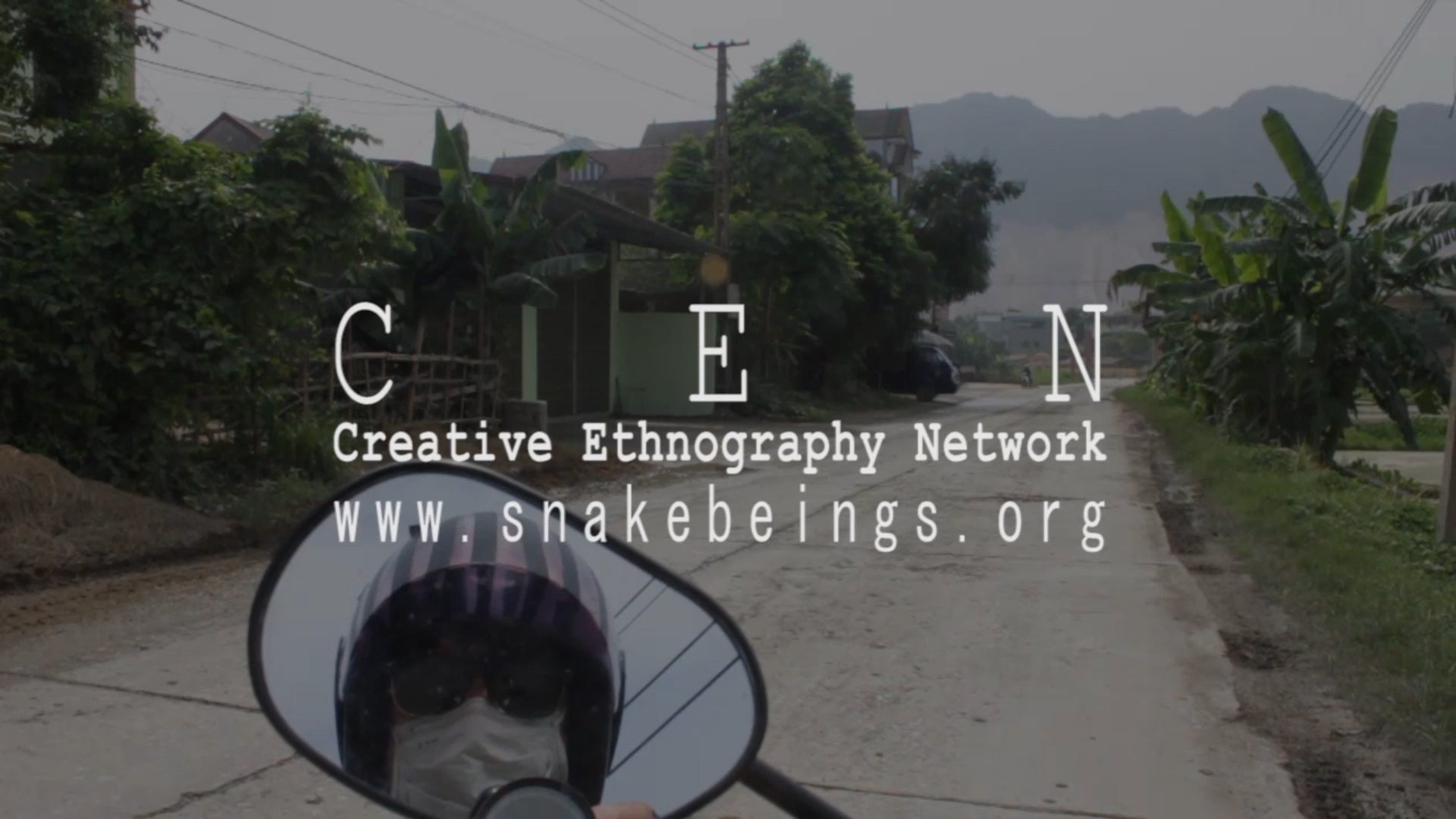
Creative Ethnography Network, Vietnam 2019

- Creative Ethnography Network Series

== Electrical Shrines ==
Between the years 1991 and 2001 Emit Snake-Beings created over 30 coin-operated electrical shrines, reflecting a combination of technology and religious deities within a polytheist system. Described as techno-animist machines the shrines were made as a series of free standing works and commissioned pieces and ranged from 4 cm X 4 cm to over 2 Meters in height. "The Shrine to Nikola Tesla", created in 1995, was displayed in the tattooist shop 'Sacred Art' London N16 for several years.

Detail from Tattooist's Electrical Reliquary Spirit Box – coin-operated shrine made by Emit Snake-Beings

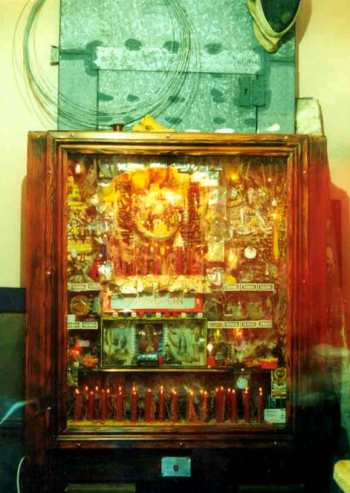
Bascilica of the Tattooist – coin-operated shrine made by Emit Snake-Beings

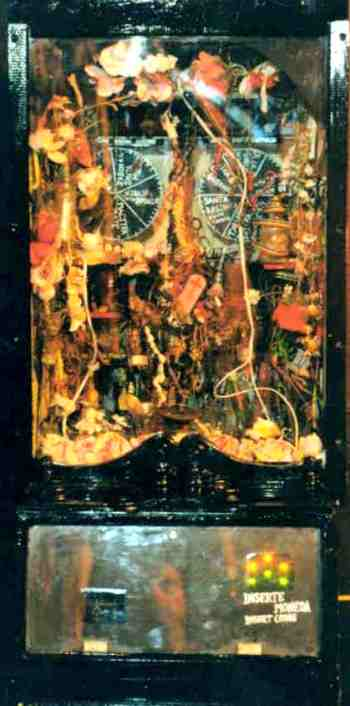
NSTRA SNRA de las Bombillas – (our lady of the lightbulbs – coin-operated shrine made by Emit Snake-Beings
