= Toy Love (film) =

2002 New Zealand drama film

- Directed by: Harry Sinclair
- Written by: Harry Sinclair
- Produced by: John Swimmer Productions
- Starring: Dean O'Gorman; Kate Elliott; Marissa Stott; Michael Lawrence; Genevieve McClean; Chris Dykzeul; Peter Feeney; Quinton Hita; Miriama Smith; Kim Michalis; Rose McIver; Lynette Forday
- Cinematography: Grant McKinnon
- Edited by: Margot Francis
- Music by: Victoria Kelly; Joost Langeveld
- Distributed by: New Zealand Film Commission
- Release dates: 6 October 2002 (Warsaw Film Festival); 8 May 2003 (New Zealand)
- Running time: 88 minutes
- Country: New Zealand
- Language: English

Toy Love is a 2002 New Zealand drama film written and directed by Harry Sinclair and features Dean O'Gorman, Kate Elliott, Marissa Stott, Michael Lawrence, Genevieve McClean, Chris Dykzeul, Peter Feeney, Quinton Hita, Miriama Smith, Kim Michalis, Rose McIver and Lynette Forday.

== Plot ==
Love is a game for Ben who lies and cheats on his girlfriend Emily, with the greatest of ease. But when he meets the sexy and unpredictable Chlo, the tables are turned. Ben falls head over heels in love, and is astonished to find someone even more immoral than he is.

== Cast ==
Actor	Role
Dean O'Gorman	Ben
Kate Elliott	Chlo
Marissa Stott	Emily
Michael Lawrence	Francois
Genevieve McClean	Nancy
Chris Dykzeul	Mick
Peter Feeney	Jim
Quinton Hita	Mat
Miriama Smith	Hinemoa
Kim Michalis	Imogen
Rose McIver	Lucy
Lynette Forday	Empathy

== Awards ==
Festival Internacional de Cinema do Porto 2003

- Won – Audience Jury Award – Harry Sinclair

Gijón International Film Festival 2002

- Nominated – Best Feature (Grand Prix Asturias) – Harry Sinclair

New Zealand Film and TV Awards 2003

- Nominated – Best Actress – Kate Elliott
- Nominated – Best Contribution to a Soundtrack – Tim Prebble
- Nominated – Best Editing – Margot Francis
- Nominated – Best Original Music – Victoria Kelly, Joost Langeveld

== See also ==
- Cinema of New Zealand
