= Aidee Walker =

New Zealand actress & director (born 1981)

- Born: Adrianne Joy Walker; Hamilton, Waikato, New Zealand
- Occupations: Actress; writer; director; producer
- Years active: 2003–present
- Partner: Talor Wikohika
- Children: 1

Aidee Walker (born 1981) is a New Zealand film and television actress and television director.

== Biography ==
Walker grew up in Hamilton, and attended Hamilton Girls' High School. While there, she formed a rock band called Handsome Geoffrey with Anna Coddington and Janna Hawkes; the band went on to win the 1998 Smokefree Rockquest. She then moved to Auckland to study drama at Unitec Institute of Technology, graduating with a bachelor's degree in performing arts.

In 2005, Walker began appearing as the character Draska Droslic on the television series Outrageous Fortune, a role she continued in until 2010. She also spent some years overseas performing and studying. After returning to New Zealand, she started to write and perform her own work and then moved into writing and directing films. Her first short film, The F.E.U.C, was selected for the Palm Springs Short Film Festival in California and the Show Me Shorts Festival in New Zealand. Her second short film, Friday Tigers, was selected for the Melbourne International Film Festival. In 2022, she directed Simone Nathan's comedy series, Kid Sister.

=== Recognition ===
- 2018 Huawei Mate20 New Zealand Television Awards: nominated for Best Actress for Catching the Black Widow
- 2013 New Zealand International Film Festival: Jury Prize for Best Short Film for Friday Tiger; Audience Choice Award for Favourite Short Film for Friday Tiger
- 2012 Sorta Unofficial New Zealand Film Awards: nominated for Best Supporting Actress for How to Meet Girls from a Distance

== Filmography ==
=== Film ===
Title	Year	Role	Notes
The Locals	2003	Lisa	
Lines Crossed	2009	Female	Short film
Drop Dead Gorgeous	2010	Pam	
Hitch Hike	2012	Heather	Short film
How to Meet Girls from a Distance	2012	Emma	
The F.E.U.C.	2012	Nicolette	Short film; also writer, director and producer
The Sleeping Plot	2013		Short film; also writer
Friday Tigers	2013	Ana	Short film; also writer and director
Dive	2014	Friend at Door #1 (voice)	Short film
Shout at the Ground	2016	Deb	Short film
Patient Seven	2016		segment: "The Sleeping Plot"
Break in the Weather	2016	Jamie Wright	Short film; also writer and director
Catching the Black Widow	2017	Lee-Anne	
Laundry	2017	Carly	Short film
Mosley	2019	voice	

=== Television ===
Title	Year	Role	Notes
Mercy Peak	2003	Bindy	2 episodes
Outrageous Fortune	2005	Draska Doslic	Recurring role (series 1–3, 6: 17 episodes)
Interrogation	2005	Rebecca	Episode: "Her Own Free Will"
Nothing Trivial	2011	Kim	Episode: "What Is a Pyrrhic Victory?"
Step Dave	2014	Jen	Main role
Nowhere Boys	2014	Michelle Keats	5 episodes
Catching the Black Widow	2017	Lee-Anne Cartier	Television film
Wilde Ride	2017	Penny Grady	Episode: "Pilot"
Power Rangers Super Ninja Steel	2018	Venoma (voice)	5 episodes
In Dark Places	2018	Ingrid Squire	Television film
The Brokenwood Mysteries	2018	Amy	Episode: "The Dark Angel"
One Lane Bridge	2020	Kate Ryder	Main role
Blue Murder Motel	2026	Theresa	Episode: "Home Is Where You Park It"

=== Video games ===
Title	Year	Role	Notes
Far Cry 3	2012	Additional voices	
