= Mobile Stud Unit =

New Zealand punk band

Mobile Stud Unit MSU
- MSU, Waikato 'O' week, 2000

Background information
- Origin: Hamilton, New Zealand
- Genres: Punk
- Years active: 1993–2008
- Label: Pus
- Members: Rohan "Marxi" Marx; Terry Edwards; Chris "Sven Tainui" Paki; Aaron "Leroy Brown" Watkinson
- Past members: Griff "Grifta" Robb; Jocko; Jamie Stone; Jude Richards; Dave O'Shea; Dean "Deano Ballswinger" Ballinger; SS Stormtrooper

Mobile Stud Unit (MSU) are a long-lived satirical punk band formed in Hamilton, New Zealand in 1993 by a group of students at the University of Waikato. They were renowned for their unpredictable on-stage antics and the offensive lyrical content of their songs.

While the band has had at least 10 members, outrageous frontman Rohan "Marxi" Marx has been the one constant.

Mobile Stud Unit were originators of self-described 'pus-rock' – a sound heavily influenced by early New Zealand punk bands such as those that featured on the AK79 compilation of late seventies Auckland punk bands, mixed with outwardly offensive "fart jokey" lyrics. Song titles include "Stroke Victim", "Grut Sniffer" and "Wheel of Clitoris".

== The early years ==
The Mobile Stud Unit was formed, by chance, when they entered a busking competition in 1993. The winners of the competition would go on to open for renowned New Zealand band The Mutton Birds. Winning band the Romantic Andes were unable to perform the support gig, so it went to second-place-getters Mobile Stud Unit. This posed a problem for MSU – having only one song, they were then required to write enough material to last a whole set. According to folklore the band nearly jeopardised their first official gig when they decided to get drunk and start tackling Mutton Birds frontman Don McGlashan.

== "Stu's Pie Cart" ==
"Stu's Pie Cart", off MSU's 1997 CD Blood Spew is a lament on the closing of Stu's Rivercity Diner, a popular pie cart in Hamilton East's Grey Street. The song was featured on Radio New Zealand National's Sounds Historical programme and mentioned in the 2008 book The Great New Zealand Pie Cart.

== 10th anniversary ==
MSU held their 10th anniversary in 2004 (11 years after they were formed). The line-up for the night included current and previous members who performed all MSU songs in chronological order to a full house at Diggers Bar, Hamilton. Hamilton ska band Bwa Da Riddum reunited to play support for MSU.

== 15th anniversary and break-up ==
MSU celebrated their 15th anniversary by calling it quits. The band played their final gig at Altitude Bar, Hamilton. Support was provided by Th' Shrugs and TV's Wayne Anderson. MSU played two sets of their greatest hits. The most recent line-up was joined by former members Jocko, Jamie Stone, Dave O'Shea, Deano Ballswinger and SS Stormtrooper. The band also released their final album, Road Kill, a best-of compilation.

While MSU have broken up before, Marxi stated on the band's Facebook page that this time the band has broken up for good.

== 2018 reunion ==
Despite Marxi's statement that the 15th anniversary was the end for MSU, the band reformed to support The Hard-Ons (with 5 Girls and the Illicit Wah-Wahz) at the Yot Club in Raglan on 19 May 2018. Joining Marxi in the line-up was Sven Tainui, Leroy Brown and an unidentified drummer. SS Stormtrooper appeared as a guest vocalist on Gunna Bash. Two new songs were included in the set; Weather Bomb and Dog.

== Soundtracks ==
The track "Gunna Bash" from their 2002 album Flaps is also featured on the soundtrack of the feature film The Locals and can be heard in the car chase scene.

== Discography ==
MSU have released four albums. Most notably, their 2002 album Flaps was engineered by The Datsuns's guitarist Christian Livingstone.

=== Albums ===
Year	Title	Details
1994	My Pyjamas Smell Acidicky	Label: Face; Format: Cassette tape; Catalogue: FACE001
1997	Blood Spew	Label: Pus; Format: CD; Catalogue: PUS001
2002	Flaps	Label: Pus; Format: CD; Catalogue: PUS002
2003	My Pyjamas Smell Acidicky	Reissue; Label: Pus; Format: CD; Catalogue: PUS003
2008	Road Kill: The Best and Worst of the Mobile Stud Unit 1993 – 2008	Label: Pus; Format: CD; Catalogue: PUS004

=== Compilation albums ===
Year	Title	Details
1997	Green Eggs and Hamilton	Song: "Boozing"; Label: PMI/Inchworm; Catalogue: INCHWORM2
2001	Zero Point One	Song: "Drugs at the Party"; Label: Airwigg Records; Catalogue: AIRCD003
2003	Remedial Class	Song: "Salesman"; Label: Stuntcock Records; Catalogue:
2003	The Locals original soundtrack	Song "Gunna Bash"; Label: Festival Mushroom Records; Catalogue:
