= Waira =

Japanese yōkai

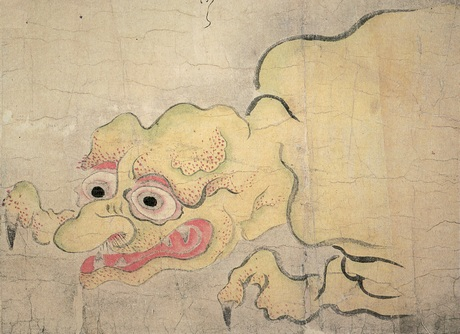
"Waira" (はいら) from the Bakemonozukushi (化物づくし), artist unknown.

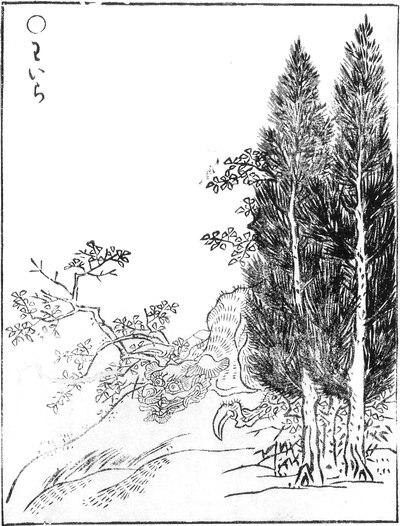
"Waira" (わいら) from the Gazu Hyakki Yagyō by Toriyama Sekien

The waira (わいら) is a Japanese yōkai from Japanese emaki (handscrolls) such as the Hyakkai Zukan by Sawaki Suushi and books such as Gazu Hyakki Yagyō (1776) by Sekien Toriyama.

== Concept ==
In the Hyakkai Zukan (1737, Sawaki Suushi), Bakemonozukushi (化物づくし) (artist and year unknown, owned by Rei Kagaya), the Bakemono Emaki (化物絵巻) (artist and year unknown, owned by the Kawasaki City Museum), the Hyakki Yagyō Emaki (1832, Oda Yoshitarō), and Bakemono no e (c. 1660, artist unknown, Harry F. Bruning Collection, Harold B. Lee Library, Brigham Young University) it is depicted with the body of a giant ox and thick sharp claws growing on each of its front legs. Each of these sources have no explanatory text besides their name, and furthermore there do not exist any documents recording any folk legends about them, so it is unknown what kind of yōkai these were intending to depict. All of the pictures depict only the upper body, and there have been no pictures found that depict its lower half, so it is unknown what its whole body looks like.

According to the Edo Period writing Kiyū Shōran (嬉遊笑覧), it can be seen that one of the yōkai that it notes is depicted in the Bakemono-e (化物絵) drawn by Kōhōgen Motonobu is one by the name of "waira."

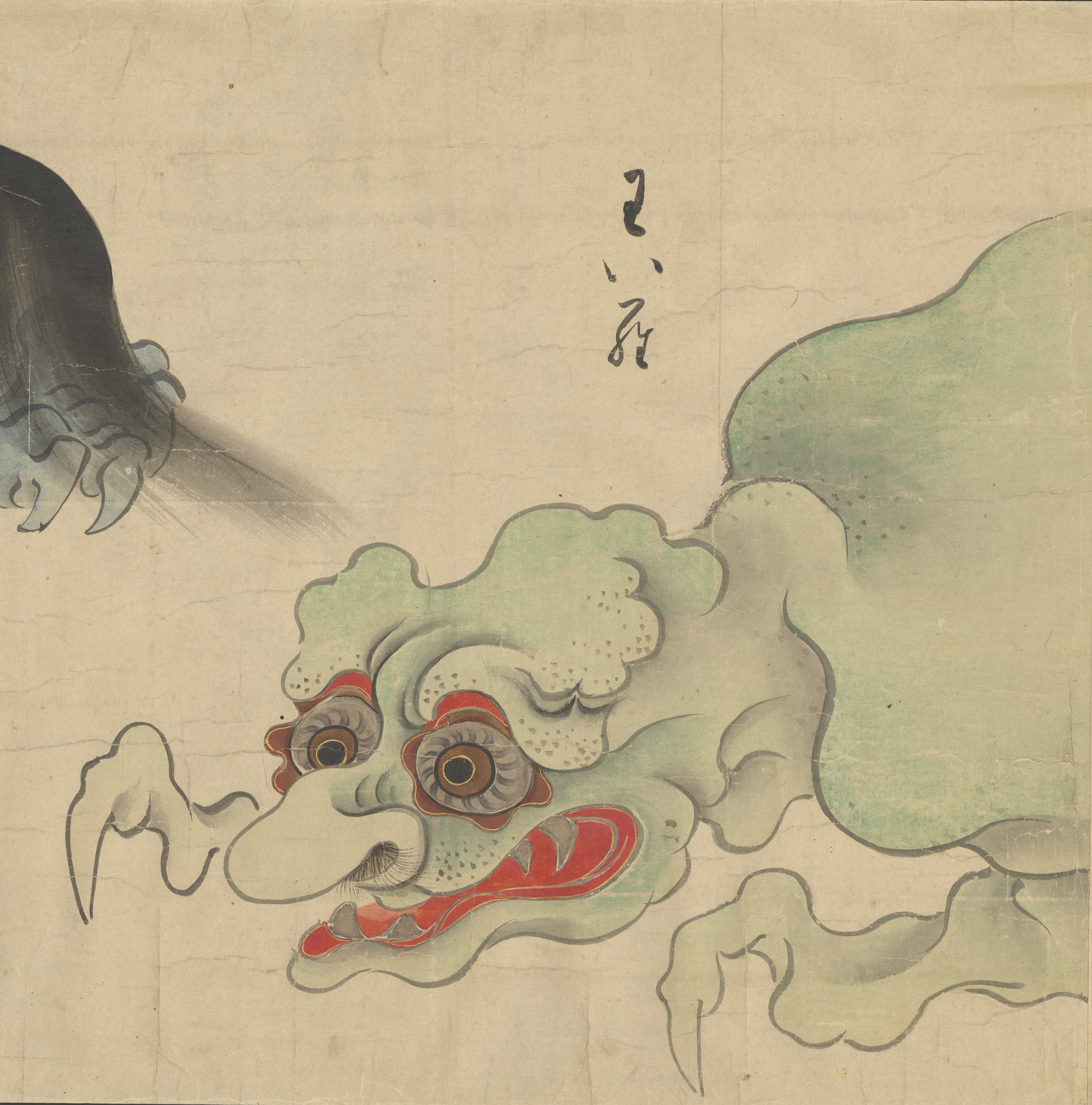
Waira, from Bakemono no e (c. 1660), Harry F. Bruning Collection, Harold B. Lee Library, Brigham Young University.

Starting in the Shōwa and Heisei periods, yōkai-related literature and children's yōkai picture book references started to give three kinds of explanations, that they are a yōkai of unknown true identity, that they are a large yōkai that live in the mountains and use the large claws on their front legs to dig up small animals like mogura (moles) to eat, and that they are a large yōkai in the mountains that attack and eat humans, among other explanations.

The art historian Nobuo Tsuji, writing about the Bakemonozukushi (artist and year unknown, owned by Rei Kagaya), notes that the picture of the "waira" in this emaki (in the emaki, it is written はいら, see image) depicts a "green monster that looks like a changed toad," and some explanatory text starting in the Heisei period have also stated that it is a toad that has gained spiritual power from age, and that their bodies are green, and so on.

The yōkai researcher Katsumi Tada notes that "wai" (畏) means "fear" or "dread," and "wairai" (畏畾) means "to grow meek from fear" or "become afraid on the spot," which is related to the waira's groveling appearance. Furthermore, both the Hyakkai Zukan and the Gazu Hyakki Yagyō put the "waira" alongside the "otoroshi", so it can be interpreted that the "waira" (恐い, fear) and "otoroshi" (恐ろしい, dread) are two yōkai that make up a pair.

== Legend ==
There is the idea that waira were spotted in the mountains eating moles (mogura), with males being brown and females being red, but according to the yōkai researchers Katsumi Tada and Kenji Murakami, this idea originally came from a children's book series "Obake Bunko" (おばけ文庫, "Monster Library") (1976, Taihei Publications) by Norio Yamada where there is an entry on the "Waira" in one of the volumes, so this is something that Yamada made up. However, Yamada asserts that he did not simply make it up, and simply forgot the original source, but did see it from somewhere.

=== Ushi-kawazu ===
The Bakemonozukushi Emaki (化け物尽し絵巻) (from the Edo Period, now in private possession and entrusted to a museum of the Fukuoka Prefecture), considered to be a yōkai emaki that was made for putting captions on previously existing yōkai pictures seen in emakimono, the otoroshi was introduced under the name of "ushi-kawazu" (牛かわず) (for unknown reasons, all the yōkai in this emaki had their names changed). In this caption, they are stated to live in ponds and eat humans, but this is not seen in any other references or legends.

== See also ==
- List of legendary creatures from Japan
