= The Gulf (TV series) =

New Zealand television series

- Genre: Crime drama
- Created by: Paula Boock; Donna Malane
- Written by: Paula Boock; Donna Malane
- Starring: Kate Elliott; Ido Drent
- Opening theme: "Body of Water" by Moniker and Hollie Fullbrook
- Ending theme: "Body of Water" by Moniker and Hollie Fullbrook
- Composer: Moniker
- Countries of origin: New Zealand; Germany
- Original language: English
- No. of series: 2
- No. of episodes: 14

Production
- Executive producers: Philly de Lacey; Christian Friedrichs; Donna Malane; Paula Boock; Frank Seyberth; Sue Woodfield; Andrew Szusterman; Katrin Goetter; Henning Kamm; Claus Wunn
- Producers: Donna Malane; Paula Boock; Bridget Bourke
- Production locations: Auckland and Waiheke Island, New Zealand
- Cinematography: Dave Cameron; Rewa Harre
- Editors: Jochen FitzHerbert; Gretchen Peterson; Eric De Beus
- Running time: 45 minutes
- Production companies: Banijay; Screentime New Zealand; Lippy Pictures; Letterbox Filmproduktion; MediaWorks (2019)

Original release
- Network: Three (New Zealand); ZDF (Germany)
- Release: 26 August 2019 – 19 April 2021

The Gulf is a New Zealand-based crime drama television series, first broadcast on the Three network on 26 August 2019. The series, described as New Zealand's answer to "scandi-noir", follows troubled investigator DSS Jess Savage, played by Kate Elliott, who solves cases on her home of Waiheke Island, all whilst trying to piece together the events surrounding the death of her husband in a seemingly routine car crash. The title refers to the Hauraki Gulf which separates the island from the mainland.

Following a successful debut run in 2019, the series was commissioned for a second run in early 2020, premiering on March 1, 2021. Outside of New Zealand, the series has been sold to Netflix, Amazon Prime Video in the United States and Sundance Now. The series also broadcast on Alibi in the UK, with the first series airing from February 26, 2020, with each two-part story combined into one single broadcast. The second and final series premiered on December 15, 2021.

== Cast ==
- Kate Elliott as Detective Senior Sergeant Jess Savage
- Ido Drent as Detective Sergeant Justin Harding
- Timmie Cameron as Ruby Savage
- Dahnu Graham as AJ Jackson
- Bede Skinner as Alex Parsons
- Jeffrey Thomas as Retired Detective Inspector Doug Bennington (series 1)
- Alison Bruce as Senior Sergeant Denise Abernethy
- Mark Mitchinson as Detective Inspector Ivan Petrie
- Pana Hema Taylor as Constable Rory Kerr (series 1)
- Ross Brannigan as Constable Paul "Pup" Phillips
- Vinnie Bennett as Sgt. Taiaroa Gray (series 2)
- Simon Prast as Adam Harding

== Transmissions ==
Series	Episodes	Originally released	
Series	Episodes	First released	Last released
1	6	26 August 2019	30 September 2019
2	8	1 March 2021	19 April 2021

== Episodes ==
=== Series 1 (2019) ===
No.	Title	Directed by	Written by	Original release date
1	"Nathan ― Part 1"	Charlie Haskell	Paula Boock & Donna Millane	26 August 2019
Twelve-year-old Nathan Baum reappears, having disappeared five years previously during a school trip. DSS Jess Savage, back at work following the death of her husband in a car crash, and having suffered amnesia herself, struggles to piece together the failings of the original investigation, until a flashback suggests that Nathan may not be the only child who was abducted.
2	"Nathan ― Part 2"	Charlie Haskell	Paula Boock & Donna Millane	2 September 2019
As the hunt for Lucy gets underway, Jess tasks Justin with re-interviewing all of the former witnesses. But just as the timeline leading up to Nathan's disappearance seems weaker than ever, Justin has a forensic breakthrough which leads the team to the doorstep of the abductor.
3	"Dividend ― Part 1"	Gaysorn Thavat	Paula Boock & Donna Millane	9 September 2019
Jess' suspicions over Bennington's involvement in the Nathan Baum case begin to escalate. Her efforts to expose her former boss are hampered when a distraught father turns up on her doorstep begging for her help to find his missing daughter. A shock revelation threatens to upset the relationship between Jess and Ruby.
4	"Dividend ― Part 2"	Gaysorn Thavat	Paula Boock & Donna Millane	16 September 2019
When a decomposed body washes up on the beach, the investigation takes a startling turn. A fellow partygoer is later reported missing, and video footage from the evening in question shines a light on two potential suspects. A secret from Justin's past comes back to haunt him.
5	"Hunters ― Part 1"	Robert Sarkies	Paula Boock & Donna Millane	23 September 2019
The shooting of a Maori man by a retired detective following a botched burglary leads to increased tensions amongst the residents of Waiheke Island, least of all Jess - whose memory is starting to return. Meanwhile, the investigation has personal ramifications for Rory.
6	"Hunters ― Part 2"	Robert Sarkies	Paula Boock & Donna Millane	30 September 2019
Justin is forced to step up in light of Jess' absence, but as her story finally begins to unravel, someone threatens to reveal her most treasured secret.

=== Series 2 (2021) ===
No.	Title	Directed by	Written by	Original release date
1	"Abduction ― Part 1"	Charlie Haskell	Paula Boock & Donna Millane	1 March 2021
2	"Abduction ― Part 2"	Charlie Haskell	Paula Boock & Donna Millane	8 March 2021
3	"Te Ao Uenuku ― Part 1"	Robert Sarkies	Paula Boock & Donna Millane	15 March 2021
4	"Te Ao Uenuku ― Part 2"	Robert Sarkies	Paula Boock & Donna Millane	22 March 2021
5	"Immigration ― Part 1"	Helena Brooks	Paula Boock & Donna Millane	29 March 2021
6	"Immigration ― Part 2"	Charlie Haskell	Paula Boock & Donna Millane	5 April 2021
7	"Inheritance ― Part 1"	Caroline Bell Booth	Paula Boock & Donna Millane	12 April 2021
8	"Inheritance ― Part 2"	Caroline Bell Booth	Paula Boock & Donna Millane	19 April 2021
