= Otoroshi =

Type of Japanese yōkai

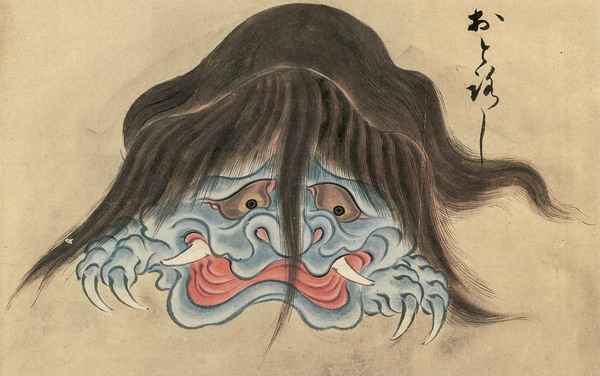
- Otoroshi as shown in the Hyakkai-Zukan

Creature information
- Other names: Ke Ippai; Odoro-odoro; Odoroshi; Odoro-odoroshi; Otoron
- Grouping: Yokai

Origin
- First attested: Bakemono Tsukushi / Bakemonozukushi
- Country: Japan

Otoroshi (おとろし; "scary") are a Japanese yōkai that appear in several yōkai emaki, such as the Hyakkai Zukan by Sawaki Suushi and the Gazu Hyakki Yagyō by Toriyama Sekien (1776). Other names include Odoro-odoro, Ke Ippai (毛一杯, "much hair"), Odoroshi, Odoro-odoroshi, and Otoron.

== Name ==
The Otoroshi's name likely comes from a regional corruption of the word osoroshii meaning scary, frightening or disheveled. The names are also likely related to the terms osoroshii (恐ろしい, "dreadful"), osoreōi (畏れ多い, "fearsome"), and ochiru (落ちる, "falls down").

Concerning the change in names such as "otoroshi" and "odoro odoro," the yōkai researcher Katsumi Tada posits that in the "Bakemonozukushi," the name written was actually "orodoku" (おどろく, to surprise) with the final く (ku) written very long (refer to image), so "otoroshi" (おとろし) may be a misreading of this.

The yōkai researchers Tada and Kenji Murakami posit that the word "odorogami" (棘髪), meaning extremely long growths of hair, is another origin for the names. Furthermore, both the Hyakkai Zukan and the Gazu Hyakki Yagyō put the otorshi alongside the waira, and "wai" (畏) can be understood to mean fear, so it can be interpreted that the "waira" (恐い, fear) and "otoroshi" (恐ろしい, dread) are two yōkai that make up a pair.

== Description ==
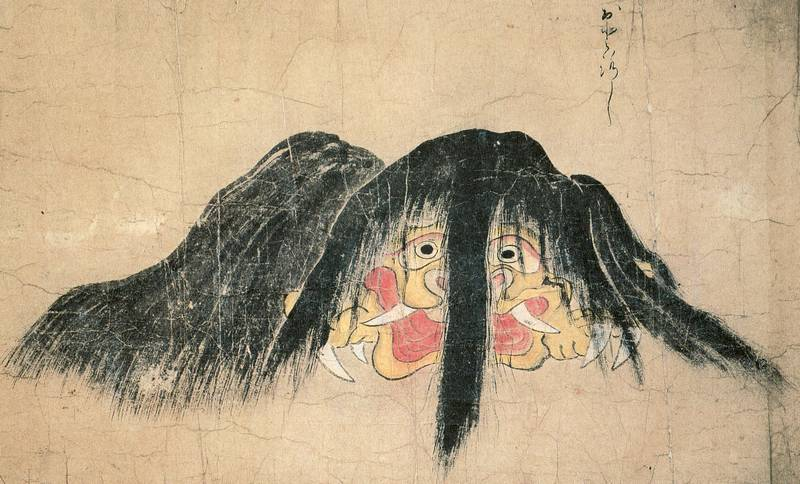
"Odoro-odoro" from the "Bakemonozukushi" (artist unknown)

The Otoroshi is a rare and mysterious creature that resembles a hunched creature that is covered in a messy mane, has blue or red skin, and large tusks. It is a master of disguise and only appears when its wants to appear. The Otoroshi is often sighted perching on top of roofs, and temple gates. It will often pounce on anyone who has a wicked soul where it will tear them to shreds and eat their remains outside of their usual food of small birds. The Otoroshi may seem like a vengeful monster, but they are only there to protect the temple gateways. They are the protectors of the Torii gates. "Nothing is known of its origins; it is speculated to be related to a similar yōkai, the waira, due to their common habits and environment."

The first depiction of Otoroshi, in the Bakemono Tsukushi, was yellow-colored. In the Hyakkai-Zukan and most other subsequest depictions of the creature have shown it with blue skin.

== Legends ==
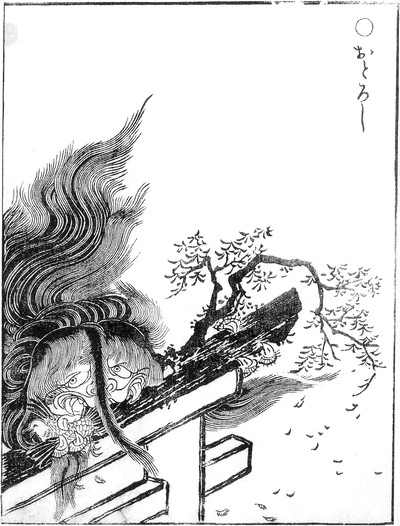
"Otoroshi" from the Gazu Hyakki Yagyō by Toriyama Sekien

In yōkai-related literature and children's illustrated yōkai reference books starting in the Shōwa and Heisei periods, it is often explained that when they find people who do imprudent or mischievous things at shrines, they would suddenly come falling from above. Also, in the Tōhoku Kaidan no Tabi (1974) by the author Norio Yamada, under the title of "Otoroshi," there is a story about how in Fukushima Prefecture, when the unfaithful who have never even once visited a temple go to their mother's funeral, upon passing under the temple gates, they would suddenly be seized by a thick arm and hoisted up. Kenji Murakami did not find any legends that followed this explanatory text and posits that this is based on Sekien's otoroshi picture in the Gazu Hyakki Yagyō (where it perches atop a torii).

=== Legend in Akita ===
While it is unknown what relation this may have with the otoroshi in yōkai pictures, in Yuki no Idewaji (雪の出羽路) (1814) by Edo Period traveler Sugae Masumi, there is the following story about a hill road:

If you pass by the Sae no Kamizaka at evening among other times in a leisurely stroll with a light drizzle and thick clouds, there would be a man who meets with a woman, the woman would meet with the man, and nurarihyon, otoroshi, nozuchi, among others would go on a hyakki yagyō, so some call it the bakemonozaka (monster hill).

In the same book is written that the "Sae no Kamizaka" (道祖ノ神坂) is in the town of Sakuraguchi, Inaniwa, Ogachi District Dewa Province (now the town of Inaniwa, Yuzawa, Akita Prefecture).

Also, in the public archives of Akita Prefecture, there is a nikuhitsu book titled Kubota Jōka Hyakumonogatari thought to be created by a warrior of the Akita Domain (author and year unknown), there is a depiction of a human-like yōkai with a huge head called the "Naganozaka Hiyama Yashiki no Odoroshi" as one of the yōkai called forth by the hitotsume-kozō.

=== Shishitori ===
The Bakemonozukushi Emaki (化け物尽し絵巻) (from the Edo Period, now in a museum of the Fukuoka Prefecture), considered to be a yōkai emaki that was made for putting captions on previously existing yōkai pictures seen in emakimono, the otoroshi was introduced under the name of "shishitori" (しゝこり) (all the yōkai in this emaki had their names changed). In this caption, they have a height of about 8 shaku (about 1.8 meters), and a size of about 8 jō in area, and its mouth was 1 jō, 1 shaku in length (about 3.3 meters). They appear in a town called Narabayashi, Buzen Province (perhaps now Narabayashi, Tsunawaki, Iizuka, Fukuoka Prefecture), and they eat horses and cattle in one gulp. It is said that the end of a mountain hunt, it tried to hide in a cave, when it was finished off with a bamboo spear.

== Popular culture ==
- Different adaptions of Otoroshi appear in the Super Sentai franchise:
  - In Samurai Sentai Shinkenger, the monster Ushirobushi is an Otoroshi-themed Ayakashi. In its adaption Power Rangers Samurai, the monster was adapted as "Robtish."
  - In Shuriken Sentai Ninninger, the Otoroshi is the result of a sealing shuriken coming in contact with a lawn mower. In its adaption Power Rangers Ninja Steel, the monster was adapted as "Game Goblin."
- An Otoroshi is featured in Yo-kai Watch.
- In AdventureQuest Worlds, the Otoroshi lives on Yokai Island. One Otoroshi guards the gates of Green Shell Village until it was affected by the negative energy as a result of the fight with Jaaka and became hostile to everyone. The players had to lure the Otoroshi from the gates and defeat it. While Otoroshi sports a recolored and long-haired version of the Oni Fukumen helm for a head, its body is a recolored version of Spid-Squider's body.
