= Kate Elliott (actress) =

New Zealand television and film actress

- Born: 30 December 1981 (age 44); Auckland, New Zealand
- Spouses: Milan Borich (m. 2006) David Benge (m. 2016)
- Children: 2

Kate Elliott (born 30 December 1981) is a New Zealand television and film actress. She was born in Auckland, and resides in Sydney, Australia.

== Career ==
Kate played ‘Clark’ in Flying Lotus’s film Ash. She also portrayed ‘Heidi’ the literary agent in ABC’s Austin. Kate has portrayed New Zealand icons Katherine Mansfield in ‘Bliss’ and Jean Batten in ‘Jean’. Kate played the violent inmate ‘Spike’ in Wentworth series 5. Kate played the role of one of the "Liberators" in The Cult. She has acted in The Insider's Guide To Love, The Locals, Fracture, and Toy Love. She played Yakut, an Amazon, in several episodes of Xena: Warrior Princess, 1998–2000. Elliott also assumed the role of Lily in Cleopatra 2525. She plays a vampire in a film called 30 Days of Night and the role of Detective Jess Savage in the New Zealand mini-series The Gulf.

Kate has won three Best Actress awards and been nominated three more times at the NZ film and TV awards.

== Personal life ==
She was married to Pluto's lead singer, Milan Borich, on 17 January 2006. They have a daughter. In 2016 she eloped with David Benge, managing director of the New Zealand office of worldwide media company VICE. Both marriages had ended by 2019. Elliott came out queer to her daughter in 2019.

== Filmography ==
=== Film ===
Year	Title	Role	Notes
2001	No One Can Hear You	Lisa Burchall	
2002	Toy Love	Chlo	
2003	The Locals	Kelly	
2004	Fracture	Leeanne Rosser	
2006	Knife Shift	Rachel	Short
2007	30 Days of Night	Dawn	
2012	Fresh Meat	Gigi	
2015	Deathgasm	Abigail	
2015	Not Like Her	Nicole	Short
2016	We All Need Love	Vic	Short
2025	Ash	Clarke	

=== Television ===
Year	Title	Role	Notes
1997	House of Sticks	Cammy Anders	TV film
1998–2000	Xena: Warrior Princess	Yakut	Recurring role
2000	Cleopatra 2525	Lily	"Home", "Rescue", "The Watch"
2000–2002	Street Legal	Melanie Wyeth	Recurring role
2002	Always Greener	Hayley	"Mirror Image"
2006	The Insider's Guide To Love	Nicole	"Fallen in Love Lately?"
2007	The Adventures of Voopa the Goolash	Lali	TV series
2009	The Cult	Gina Delaney	Main role
2011	Bliss	Katherine Mansfield	TV film
2011–12	Power Rangers Samurai	Dayu (voice)	Main role
2011, 2013	Shortland Street	Zlata	Recurring Role
2014	Agent Anna	Rhonda	"2.9"
2016	Jean	Jean Batten	TV film
2018	Wentworth	Spike Baxter	TV series: 6 episodes
2018	Power Rangers Super Ninja Steel	Simone Swift	"Fan Frenzy"
2019	The Gulf	D.S.S Jess Savage	Main Role
2024-present	Austin	Heidi	TV series:9 episodes

=== Video games ===
Year	Title	Role	Notes
2011	Saban's Power Rangers Samurai	Dayu	Voice
2012	Saban's Power Rangers Super Samurai	Dayu	Voice
