= The Locals =

- Directed by: Greg Page
- Written by: Greg Page
- Produced by: Steve Sachs
- Starring: Kate Elliott; Dwayne Cameron; Paul Glover; John Barker; Aidee Walker
- Cinematography: Bret Nichols
- Music by: Victoria Kelly
- Production company: Locals Films/Essential Films
- Distributed by: New Zealand Film Commission
- Release date: 2003
- Running time: 88 min
- Country: New Zealand
- Language: English

The Locals is a 2003 New Zealand horror film directed by Greg Page and starring Kate Elliott. The film took in a modest sum at the box-office following negative reviews.

== Plot ==
The film follows two best friends Grant and Paul who hit the road for a weekend of surfing, booze and hopefully... girls. With night falling they take a short cut and meet Lisa and Kelly, a couple of babes with a fast car, who invite them to a party. Lust takes the wheel and a game of cat and mouse begins leading them deep into the heartland of evil where they meet... The Locals.

== Cast ==
- Kate Elliott – Kelly
- Dwayne Cameron – Paul
- Paul Glover – Martin
- John Barker – Grant
- Aidee Walker – Lisa

== Soundtrack ==
The soundtrack to The Locals was compiled by director Greg Page and released on Festival Mushroom Records It includes tracks by eight bands Page had directed music videos for, with the remaining three artists (Inspector Moog, Rumpus Room and Mobile Stud Unit) being Hamilton bands who had inspired Page when writing the film.

No.	Title	Artist	Length
1.	"Lady"	The Datsuns	3:00
2.	"Christmas"	Elemeno P	2:35
3.	"Supa Day"	Betchadupa	3:59
4.	"Milk Biscuit Boy"	Inspector Moog	2:11
5.	"We Go Out"	Stellar	2:49
6.	"Head Down"	Rumpus Room	2:45
7.	"Use Someone"	PanAm	3:03
8.	"Party"	The D4	2:39
9.	"Believer"	8 Foot Sativa	3:39
10.	"Gunna Bash"	Mobile Stud Unit	2:04
11.	"Nil By Mouth"	Blindspott	3:36
Total length:			33:00
