= Marissa Stott =

New Zealand actress

- Born: 13 June; New Zealand
- Occupations: Film & Television actress

Marissa Stott (born 13 June) is an actress who currently resides in Berlin, Germany.

One of her most memorable roles was on New Zealand's medical soap opera Shortland Street where in 2005 she played Amanda Warner, twin sister to Dr. Chris Warner.

Marissa is also a skilled voice artist. She has done numerous radio ad campaigns and does regular voice work for La-Z-Boy.

== Filmography ==
=== Film ===
Year	Title	Role	Notes
2002	Toy Love	Emily	
2003	Orphans and Angels	Zane	
2007	Jet Black	Audrey	Short
2008	The Heist	Mira	Short

=== Television ===
Year	Title	Role	Notes
1993	Australia's Most Wanted	Murdered Nightclubber	1 episode
1993	Clowning Around 2	French Woman	TV film
1997–99	Shortland Street	Nina Clarkson	Regular role
2002	Blood Crime	Reception Nurse	TV film
2004	Secret Agent Men	Speed Morrison	"Days of Chunder"
2005–07	Shortland Street	Amanda Warner	Recurring role
2006	Doves of War	Fiona McIntyre	"1.6"
2014	Power Rangers Super Megaforce	Woman	"Power of Six"
2015–16	Ash vs Evil Dead	Tattoo Girl	"El Jefe", "The Dark One"
2016	Power Rangers Dino Super Charge	Beauticruel (voice)	"Love at First Fight"
2018	Power Rangers Super Ninja Steel	Badonna (voice)	Regular role

=== Music videos ===
Year	Role	Song	Band
1996		Come Home	The Chills
1996	Bus Stop Girl	I Wanna Know	Dead Flowers
1997	Scorned Woman	Never	Coelacanth
1998	Beautiful Woman	Tears Were Blue	Bike
