= Campbell Cooley =

American actor (born 1966)

- Born: January 13, 1966 (age 60); Pensacola, Florida, U.S.
- Education: University of Louisville (BFA)
- Occupation: Actor
- Years active: 1997–present
- Known for: Power Rangers

Campbell Cooley (born January 13, 1966) is an American voice and television actor based in New Zealand, best known for voicing prominent villains in the Power Rangers franchise.

== Early life ==
Cooley attended the University of Louisville, where he received a Bachelor of Fine Arts degree in Theatre. For several years, he worked as a stage actor and director.

== Career ==
In 1997, Cooley moved into acting for film and television. In 1998 (during a four-month period), he played three different villainous roles on Xena: Warrior Princess. One of the roles gave him the distinction of being victim to Gabrielle (Renee O'Connor) in the "infamous Drool scene", is named by Xena fans, from the episode, "In Sickness and In Hell".

In 2005, Cooley appeared in New Zealand's medical soap opera Shortland Street as nurse 'Liam Todd', caregiver to Dr. Chris Warner's twin sister, Amanda Warner (Marissa Stott).

In 2007, Cooley got his first major role in the Power Rangers franchise, the new voice of Alpha 6 in the Operation Overdrive episode “Once a Ranger”. He would go on to voice Admiral Malkor in Power Rangers Megaforce, Snide in Power Rangers Dino Super Charge, Galaxy Warriors host Cosmo Royale and Ripcon in Power Rangers Ninja Steel and Super Ninja Steel and Scrozzle in Power Rangers Beast Morphers. He would later voice new general Slyther in Power Rangers Dino Fury.

In 2018, Cooley began branching out into anime dubbing roles, with small parts in series including One Piece and Trigun Stampede.
