= Unlimited Power (comics) =

2020–2022 American two-part crossover comic book storyline

- Combined covers for Mighty Morphin issue #1 and Power Rangers issue #1.
- Publisher: Boom! Studios (licensed by Hasbro)
- Publication date: November 2020 – February 2022
- Genre: Science fiction Superhero
Title(s)
- Part 1
- Mighty Morphin #1–12
- Power Rangers #1–12
- Power Rangers Unlimited: Heir to Darkness
- Power Rangers Unlimited: Edge of Darkness
- Part 2: "The Eltarian War"
- Mighty Morphin #13–16
- Power Rangers #13–16
- Main characters: Power Rangers; Omega Rangers; Astronema; Phantom Ranger

Creative team
- Writers: Frank Gogol; L. L. McKinney; Ryan Parrott
- Pencillers: Francesco Mortarino; Simone Ragazzoni; Marco Renna
- Letterer: Ed Dukeshire
- Colorists: Raúl Angulo; Walter Baiamonte; Sabrina del Grosso; Jose Enrique Fernández; Igor Monti; Katia Ranalli
- Editors: Matthew Levine; Dafna Pleban

"Unlimited Power" is a 2020–2022 American two-part crossover comic book storyline published by Boom! Studios, based on the Power Rangers franchise by Haim Saban, Toei Company, and Hasbro and based on Super Sentai by Toei Company. It is the sequel to "Necessary Evil" and the third crossover event in the Power Rangers comics by Boom!

== Publication history ==
In July 2020, Boom! Studios announced the 2016 Mighty Morphin Power Rangers comic book series would conclude in October 2020, with a new storyline titled "Unlimited Power" being presented through two new separate series to debut in November 2020.

In addition to the event, a one-shot issue titled Power Rangers Unlimited: Heir to Darkness was released on March 31, 2021. Another one-shot titled Power Rangers Unlimited: Edge of Darkness was released on June 30, 2021.

In August 2021, Boom! and Hasbro announced "The Eltarian War" as the second part of the event, being written by Ryan Parrott through issues #13–16 of the ongoing Mighty Morphin and Power Rangers series, between November 2021 and February 2022. According to Parrot, this event continues where "Unlimited Power" left off, and it tells more about Lord Zedd's backstory, as well as the introduction of a new Blue Omega Ranger.

== Background ==
=== Mainstream universe ===
- Mighty Morphin Power Rangers #51–55 by Ryan Parrott, Moisés Hidalgo, Walter Baiamonte and Igor Monti.

In the mainstream universe, after the defeat of Kiya and the Anointed, (Note: As depicted in "Necessary Evil".) Lord Drakkon (who survived his time within the Morphin Grid) is sent back to Earth, where the Power Rangers locked him up in the Command Center. Lord Zedd reunites with his minions in order to recruit a clone of Rita Repulsa and use the Chaos Crystal to turn them into his own "Dark Rangers". Grace Sterling helps Billy Cranston on repairing the Green Power Coin for a new candidate. Meanwhile, Zedd sends his new Dark Rangers to attack Angel Grove to attract the Power Rangers. After a brief battle, only the Rita clone defeats Tommy Oliver. Zedd then uses the Chaos Crystal to summon the Terrorzords, and the Power Rangers are almost defeated, but a mysterious Green Ranger, who was recruited by Grace Sterling and Promethea for the Green Protocol, destroys Zedd's Chaos Crystal, enabling the Power Rangers to defeat the Dark Rangers, who lost their powers in the process.

Meanwhile, the Omega Rangers travel to the planet Gorvinos III to return its people, only to find it in ruins. Then the mysterious figure appears, and reveals itself as a member of the Empyreals, a race that has decided to wipe out the universe entirely, and is responsible for murdering the Red Emissary. The Emperyal defeats the Omega Rangers, causing them to flee to Earth.

=== Alternate universe ===
- Power Rangers: Ranger Slayer by Ryan Parrott, Dan Mora and Goni Montes.
- Power Rangers: Drakkon New Dawn #1–3 by Anthony Burch and Simone Ragazzoni.

In the alternate universe, everyone believes Lord Drakkon is dead, and the Ranger Slayer tries to make amends with her past, which leads to confront Scorpina, the new Commander of Drakkon's Ranger Sentry army. After a hard talk, Slayer gets the trust of the Coinless, but they are attacked by zombies led by the ghost of Rita Repulsa, who was summoned by Trini Kwan as a desperate measure to end their war, to no avail. Slayer has later convinced the Sentries to join forces with the Coinless to fight Rita's army. Trini and Scorpina succeed in trapping Rita on her staff, causing the zombies to vanish. Slayer is chosen by everyone to take Drakkon's place as the new leader of the Sentries.

As Slayer tries to adjust herself into her new role, the aftermath of Drakkon's rampage seems to be irreparable. After having an altercation with a Coinless rebel, Adam Park suggests locking him in the Deathlock, a special prison made by Drakkon, leading Slayer to go there and free all the prisoners inside. As she releases a man inside a Ranger armor, he desperately reveals her actions activated a signal, sending a message that allows an army of space monsters to conquer the world in case Drakkon was defeated. After being freed from his armor, the prisoner is revealed to be Jason Scott, and Scorpina reveals that the invading creatures are led by Eclipta, an emissary of Dark Specter. Jason suggests removing the Power Coins from the Deathlock's disruptor, but the others refuse. However, during the battle between the Sentries and Eclipta's army, Jason removes the Coins anyway, causing the Sentries to lose their powers. Slayer convinces him it is no longer the right way to do, but she gets the idea to use the remaining Power Coins on a reactor to spread the Morphin Energy around everyone. They attack a giant Eclipta until the reactor explodes, but she is already taken down by the Coinless and the Black Dragon Army, now reformed as the "Shattered". While Slayer begins to rebuild Angel Grove, Andros informs Dark Specter about Eclipta's defeat.

== Plot ==
=== Part 1 ===
- Mighty Morphin #1–12
- Power Rangers #1–12
- Power Rangers Unlimited: Heir to Darkness
- Power Rangers Unlimited: Edge of Darkness

==== Introduction ====
- Mighty Morphin #1
- Power Rangers #1

While most of the Power Rangers discuss who the new Green Ranger is, Goldar, Finster, Squatt and Baboo discuss what to do with Lord Zedd, who got unconscious after the Green Ranger destroyed the Chaos Crystal. Meanwhile, Skull's girlfriend Candice Clark is in fact a member of the Guardians of Eltar, who was recruited for a mission on Earth.

When the Omega Rangers return to Earth, they ask Zordon for the help of Lord Drakkon, who knows many things about the Empyreals. When Zordon refuses, the Omega Rangers have no choice but to cause an outbreak to free Drakkon, causing friction with Zordon and Alpha-5.

==== Power Rangers' side story ====
- Mighty Morphin #2–11

After the outbreak, the Power Rangers discuss whether it was the right decision or not, and Zordon begins to hire bounty hunters to capture the Omega Rangers. During a visit to a fun fair, Candice is chased by Putties disguised as humans. Retreating from that battle, Zordon discovers that the new Green Ranger works for Promethea, leading him to have an argument with Grace Sterling. Back in the battle, Lord Zedd fuses the Putties into a giant version. When Skull gets unconscious for the battle, Bulk confronts Candice about keeping secrets from them, which leads her to go to Zordon and expose her true identity as Zenya of Eltar. The Green Ranger intervenes to help the Power Rangers and defeat the giant Puttie, but Zedd uses the Chaos Crystal to lock Angel Grove in a force field. In the end, the Green Ranger, through a public transmission, reveals himself as Matthew Cook to the world.

Matthew explains how Promethea recruited him to use the Green Power Coin and become the new Green Ranger, and when Zedd locks Angel Grove inside the force field, he gets the idea to expose his identity to get the citizens' trust. The Power Rangers try to deal with how Zedd could chase their families if their identities were revealed, until Grace calls for help to prevent the military forces from destroying the city. At the same time, the Rangers confront Matthew and Grace, who appeared to have sided with Zedd in a deal: in exchange for delivering him something from Zordon, Zedd would make the dome vanish. It turns out Zedd wanted to kidnap Candice/Zelya. The dome disappeared, but there is already friction between the Rangers and Promethea, and Skull stills wonders if Candice/Zelya is safe.

In the aftermath of what happened in Angel Grove, the citizens still deal with the damage done. While Skull still looks for Candice/Zelya, unaware of her identity, Matthew and Billy still attempt to regain the trust from the Power Rangers. Back on the Moon, Lord Zedd releases Zelya, but in exchange, he reveals her his true identity as Zophram, the former Supreme Guardian of Eltar, who got badly wounded after being rejected by the Zeo Crystal due to a protective incantation. Following that incident, Zartus and Zedd agreed to have enough of the Council of Elders for not taking action against Dark Specter, and Zedd believes Zordon betrayed him by insisting him on using the Zeo Crystal, despite it being under a spell. Meanwhile, Zartus introduces himself in the Command Center and insists on rescuing Zelya with the help of his own team, Sentry Force Four. However, Zelya reappears on Zartus’ ship, where she confronts her master about his role with the Empyreals and Zedd, but Zartus and his team kidnap her. Zordon reveals by the time Zelya escaped, she warned Zordon and the Power Rangers about an incoming invasion from Eltar.

==== Omega Rangers' side story ====
- Power Rangers #2–11

After the outbreak, the Omega Rangers are in the run from bounty hunters hired by Zordon, while searching for the Shattered Grid with Drakkon's help, when the ship was powered down. The Omega Rangers think it was Drakkon doing it, but it turned out it was caused by the Horrid, a race of vampire-like creatures that suffered their transformation after trying some experiments on the Morphin Grid that lead their planet to be destroyed. In an effort to buy time, Drakkon pretends to betray the Omega Rangers into order to kill the Horrid King. After the encounter, they all arrive in the Morphin Grid, which is corrupted with Drakkon's nightmares. After arriving, the team evades the spirit manifestations that used to guard Drakkon and retrieve the rests of the Red Emissary's corpse. Xi scans the body and deduces it is missing a piece to put it back together. Drakkon suggests travelling to Onyx, a planet filled with mercenaries.

During their mission, Jason and Zack are ambushed by Astronema, and the three taken into custody by S.P.D. officers, causing Astronema's mentor, Ecliptor, to seek Trini, Xi and Drakkon for help. The whole team frees Jason, Zack and Astronema, but at the cost of several S.P.D. officers being killed. After arriving at the planet Hartunia, the Omega Rangers are sent to be imprisoned by Emperor Rether Till, who denies their help against the Empyreals. However, his wife, Empress Evor Til, plans to save them in order to evacuate the people from the planet. By the time the Yellow Empyreal arrives, the Omega Rangers and the Hartunian Empire have an all-out war, buying enough time to bring most of the innocent people away. The Green Empyreal destroys Hartunia, at the cost of the lives of the Tills and the other people that could not be saved. The Orange Empyreal reports the situation to Zartus, the current leader of the Eltarian Guardians, and Candice/Zelya's superior.

Back on Safeheaven, Drakkon enlists Jason's help to find a way to defeat the Empyreals. Trini tries to use her power with the Red Emissary's corpse to contact the Yellow Emissary. Zack in dealing on how the surviving Hartunians barely adapt with the other alien species they previously conquered. Yale remembers his troubled past, to the time he faced rejection from other people, to the moment he was freed by Kiya and the Anointed. He then receives a call from the Blue Emissary, leading to an ancient temple of the Morphin Masters, when Yale is chosen as the new Blue Omega Ranger. The other Omega Rangers find the Yellow Emissary's location, where he reveals that when Kiya killed the Blue Emissary, the Orange Empyreal was revived, giving Zartus the means to revive the other Empyreals. Back on the Spectrum, Xi discovers Drakkon has been working with Zartus the entire time, in an attempt of freeing himself and regaining his powers. Meanwhile, the Green Empyreal kills the Yellow Emissary, reviving the last Empyreal.

==== Astronema's side story ====
- Power Rangers Unlimited: Heir to Darkness

On an alien planet, Astronema killed a team of Power Rangers before returning to her ship. She then remembers the time when Ecilptor trained her to become ruthless. Upon arriving at the planet Mortane, Astronema and Ecliptor enter the capital Crucius to train for a match. Unbestknown to Astronema, she had his memories altered, making her believe her family was murdered by Power Rangers for allegedly serving Dark Specter. After winning her death match against Darkonda's protégée, Astronema was chosen as the new Princess of Evil, as she gives orders to travel to Onyx, where the Omega Rangers are.

==== Phantom Ranger's side story ====
- Power Rangers Unlimited: Edge of Darkness

While investigating what happened on the planet Hartunia, the Phantom Ranger remembers the time on planet Da'quar when he had to protect Queen Fienna and an infant Rita Repulsa from the Master Vile. After escaping from Vile' armies, the Phantom Ranger takes Fienna and Rita to the Masterforge, where Grid Energy is collected. According to the Fienna, Vile was Eldin, a former researcher who became obsessed into worshiping Dark Specter, so he wanted to use Rita as a vessel to bring Dark Specter into his dimension. Then Fienna used the machine on Rita to cover her with Grid Energy, at the cost of her life. When Vile found out about it, he let the Phantom Ranger on the station while it self-destroyed, taking Rita with him. Back to his current research, the Phantom Ranger found out Dark Specter has already begun to cross over from his dimension, and his presence is even more dangerous than the Empyreals' threat.

==== Conclusion ====
- Mighty Morphin #12
- Power Rangers #12

Zelya reveals the Power Rangers about Zartus' true colors, causing Zordon to reconsider Drakkon's warning about the Empyreals, as well as asking the Omega Rangers for help. While Tommy and Aisha visit Grace, Matthew and Billy on Promethea, the Sentry Force Four attempt to capture Adam, Kimberly and Rocky. Meanwhile, Zordon meets Zedd in person to confirm his previous identity as Zophram. When Zordon returns to the Command Center and meets Billy, they are interrupted by Zartus, who reveals that he was responsible for the spell on the Zeo Crystal that caused Zophram/Zedd's wounds over his body. He also reveals his intentions to use the Empyreals to annex Earth. When Zordon decides to cut his ties with Eltar, Zartus destroys his containment chamber.

After Drakkon destroys most of Xi's body, he leaves aboard the Spectrum, abandoning the Omega Rangers in the process, while the Empyreals initiate the planet's destruction. Using Xi's corpse, the Omega Rangers try to send a video asking for help. After a few days, Yale, being the new Blue Omega Ranger, rescues them.

=== Part 2: "The Eltarian War" ===
- Mighty Morphin #13–16
- Power Rangers #13–16

After destroying Zordon's containment chamber, Zartus retreats from the Command Center, where Billy meets with Alpha-5, who agrees to use a second chamber Billy created to bring Zordon back, until they are surrounded by Eltarian soldiers. Adam, Kimberly and Rocky confront Sentry Force Four before retreating to Promethea, where they reunite with Grace, Matthew, Tommy and Aisha. Zartus visits the Moon, where he confronts Zedd before invading Promethea. Bulk and Skull agree to search for the latter's girlfriend, Candice/Zelya, who remains as a prisoner of the Guardians.

By using the Master Arch's Eternity Point, Jason, Trini, Zack and Yale return to Safehaven, where Arkon receives them. While trying to get Xi back online, Trini finds distress calls from Earth, with the last message being sent by Tommy, who asks them for help while fighting the Eltarians around Promethea. Back in the Command Center, Alpha-5 uses the security protocol that he previously used on Drakkon against the soldiers to save Billy and himself, but Goldar, Finster, Squatt and Baboo attempt to claim Zordon's chamber under Zedd's orders. When Zartus sends the Empyreals to destroy the Commander Center, Promethea and the Moon, most of the Rangers escape to Safehaven.

With Yale's help, Billy contacts the Blue Emissary in order to find Zordon through his consciousness before getting lost forever. At the beginning, Zordon reconsiders how his loyalties led to Zartus' victory, but Billy convinces him to keep fighting and learn from his mistakes. He then transfers Zordon's soul through a special robotic body that he developed during his time on Promethea. While staying on Safahaven, Goldar, Finster, Squatt and Baboo reconsider to fight alongside the Rangers. Back on Earth, the remaining Rangers stay hidden from the Eltarian army.

Zordon, Jason, Trini, Kimberly and Finster go inside Zartus' spaceship, where they free Zelya. Zordon stays behind in order to search for Lord Zedd, who survived his encounter with the Empyreals. Back on Earth, the remaining Rangers join Goldar, Squatt and Baboo against Sentry Force Four, until Zartus brings the Empyreals to destroy Earth.

During their fight, Zordon tries to reason with Zedd, as the latter blames him for his wounds, ignoring that Zartus was truly responsible. In the battle for Earth, Grace uses her special dagger to destroy Zartus' Zeo Crystal shard, causing the Empyreals to weaken, but also being free from Zartus' control. Zartus returns to the Moon in search for the last remaining shard.

When Zartus tries to use the last shard, he is ambushed by Zordon and Zedd, who finally accepts the truth behind Zartus' deception. When Tommy and Matt destroy the Orange Empyreal through the White Tiger Dragonzord, it causes the Blue Emissary to revive. The latter combines the four Omegazords into the Ultra Omegazord, and with the Thunder Megazord's help, they destroy the Green Empyreal. However, the Purple Empyreal merges with the other two into their final form, but an army of Horrid arrives at Earth to help the Rangers.

The Horrid were sent by Lord Drakkon, who became their new leader after the death of his predecessor. Under Drakkon's order, they attack the Empyreal to save the Rangers, but the latter destroys them. All the Rangers still fight against the Empyreal long enough for the Blue Emissary to kill it for good. Back on the Moon, Zartus still fights Zordon and Zedd while reveals his personal reasons to hate them both. When Zartus is about to kill Zedd, Zordon kills him by stabbing him in the chest the remaining Zeo Crystal fractal.

With Zartus and the Empyreals gone, the Eltarian armies surrender. Drakkon retreats before revealing Trini that even after he murdered Xi, he used his teleportation device to rescue the Omega Rangers through Yale. The Blue Emissary says goodbye to the Omega Rangers because he wants to find the Morphin Masters. With the help of Billy, Alpha-5 and Grace, Zordon is back in a new containment chamber. Zelya departs back to Eltar before revealing his identity to Skull, but he still accepts for what she is. Goldar, Finster, Squatt and Baboo return to the Moon with Zedd, so they can all depart to another location before archiving their final plan against the Rangers.

== Titles involved ==
Title	Issue(s)	Writer(s)	Artist(s)	Colorist(s)	Premiere date	Finale date
Part 1
Mighty Morphin	#1–12	Ryan Parrott	Marco Renna	Walter Baiamonte; Katia Ranalli	November 4, 2020	October 6, 2021
Power Rangers	#1–12	Ryan Parrott	Francesco Mortarino	Raúl Angulo; Jose Enrique Fernández	November 11, 2020	October 13, 2021
Power Rangers Unlimited: Heir to Darkness	One-shot	L. L. McKinney	Simone Ragazzoni	Igor Monti	March 31, 2021	
Power Rangers Unlimited: Edge of Darkness	One-shot	Frank Gogol	Simone Ragazzoni	Sabrina del Grosso; Igor Monti	June 30, 2021	
Part 2: "The Eltarian War"
Mighty Morphin	#13–16	Ryan Parrott	Marco Renna	Walter Baiamonte	November 10, 2021	February 9, 2022
Power Rangers	#13–16	Ryan Parrott	Francesco Mortarino	Raúl Angulo	November 17, 2021	February 16, 2022

== Collected editions ==
Title	Material collected	Pages	Publication date	ISBN
Mighty Morphin
Mighty Morphin: Volume One	Mighty Morphin #1–4	112	May 11, 2021	978-1684156702
Mighty Morphin: Volume Two	Mighty Morphin #5–8	112	August 17, 2021	1684157021, 978-1684157020
Mighty Morphin: Volume Three	Mighty Morphin #9–12	112	December 17, 2021	1684157528, 978-1684157525
Mighty Morphin: Volume Four	Mighty Morphin #13–16	112	June 28, 2022	1646685695, 978-1646685691
Power Rangers
Power Rangers: Volume One	Power Rangers #1–4	112	May 25, 2021	1684156726, 978-1684156726
Power Rangers: Volume Two	Power Rangers #5–8	112	August 24, 2021	1684157056, 978-1684157051
Power Rangers: Volume Three	Power Rangers #9–12	112	July 12, 2022	1684157536, 978-1684157532
Power Rangers: Volume Four	Power Rangers #13–16	112	June 28, 2022	1684158397, 978-1684158393
Other
Mighty Morphin/Power Rangers: Limited Edition	Mighty Morphin #1; Power Rangers #1	122	April 20, 2021	1684157013, 978-1684157013
Power Rangers Unlimited	Power Rangers Unlimited: Heir to Darkness; Power Rangers Unlimited: Edge of Darkness	122	December 7, 2021	1684157447, 978-1684157440

== Future ==
In April 2022, Boom! Studios and Hasbro announced the next crossover event titled "Charge to 100!", which is being written Mat Groom and Ryan Parrott through issues #18–22 of Mighty Morphin and Power Rangers, and concluding with Mighty Morphin Power Rangers #100.

Since October 2022, the relaunched Mighty Morphin Power Rangers series began a new storyline titled "Recharged", starting with issue #101, written by former Director of Power Rangers Development and Production Melissa Flores and drawn by recurring artist Simona Di Gianfelce. Flores considers the storyline as "a dream come true" and that the coming issues will feature "a wild ride that will aim to honor the history of the series, and push the Rangers to their absolute limits."

The second part titled "Darkest Hour" debuted in August 2023 to commemorate the thirtieth anniversary of the Power Rangers franchise.
