= Necessary Evil (comics) =

- Official cover for Might Morphin Power Rangers: Volume Eleven.
- Publisher: Boom! Studios (licensed by Hasbro)
- Publication date: June 2019 – June 2020
- Genre: Science fiction Superhero
Title(s)
Mighty Morphin Power Rangers #40-50
Saban's Go Go Power Rangers #21-32

Creative team
- Writer(s): Ryan Parrott; Sina Grace
- Artist(s): Daniele di Nicuolo; Francesco Mortarino; Daniel Bayliss; Eduardo Francisco
- Colorist(s): Walter Baiamonte; Raúl Angulo

"Necessary Evil" is a 2019–2020 crossover comic book event by Boom! Studios and Hasbro, based on the Power Rangers franchise created by Haim Saban and Super Sentai by Toei Company. The event is written by Ryan Parrott and Sina Grace through the ongoing comic book series Mighty Morphin Power Rangers and Go Go Power Rangers, making it the second crossover event in the Power Rangers comics by Boom! after 2018's "Shattered Grid".

== Publication history ==
In September 2018, the Mighty Morphin Power Rangers creative team was changed by writer Marguerite Bennett and artist Simone di Meo, introducing a storyline titled "Beyond the Grid"; Ryan Parrott continued to write Go Go Power Rangers.

In February 2019, Parrott and artist Daniele Di Nicuolo were introduced as the creative team for Mighty Morphin Power Rangers, starting with issue #40, with the next crossover event titled "Necessary Evil".

In March 2019, Ryan Parrott was announced to be co-writing Go Go Power Rangers alongside Sina Grace from issue #21.

The event concluded in June 2020, with the Go Go Power Rangers series ending after 32 issues.

== Background ==
=== "Beyond the Grid" ===
- Mighty Morphin Power Rangers #31–39 by Marguerite Bennett and Simone di Meo.

After escaping from Lord Drakkon's destruction of reality, the Promethea crew led by Grace Sterling and the alternate Kimberly Hart (Ranger Slayer) was transported to an unknown dimension, where most of the surviving Rangers cannot access their powers. Upon meeting Ellarien (Solar Ranger) and her friend Remi, the Rangers realize that she possesses a mysterious Morpher known as the Solarix, which leads to them being chased by the Crimson Raiders, led by a tyrant known as the "Praetor".

To fight this enemy, Kimberly unites a new team consisting of Tanya Sloan (Yellow Zeo Ranger), Andros (Red Space Ranger), Mike Corbett (Magna Defender), Cam Watanabe (Green Samurai Ranger) and Heckyl (Dark Dino Ranger). Meanwhile, Ellarien reveals a stranger gave her the Solarix before dying, and the Praetor wants it to access the Morphin Grid. During a fight with the Crimson Raiders, the Promethea crew manage to fight them off, welcoming Ellarien and Remi afterward.

While searching for the Morphin Grid's source, Heckyl explains how he became the Dark Dino Ranger at the cost of his planet's destruction and his mentor's death. While Ellarien and Remi spend time with the Promethea crew, they manage to find the Splintered Star, the place composed of Zeo Crystals where the Solarix was created.

Upon arriving on the Splintered Star, the Rangers deduce that Ellarien's dimension was once linked to the Morphin Grid, but that it was cut off on purpose. The Praetor attempts to manipulate Mike to steal the Solarix for him in exchange for sparing the Promethea crew. However, Mike manages to resist his influence, and returns the Solarix to Ellarien. She then learns the Praetor was a Morphin Master who wants to destroy the Solarix in order to prevent someone else from obtaining it. After learning the Solarix's true purpose, Ellarien shares its power with Kimberly's team, turning them into Solar Rangers.

After a brief fight, the Rangers manage to use the Solarix to reconnect Ellarien's dimension to the Morphin Grid, as well as sending the Praetor away to another dimension. Having restoring life, the Promethea Rangers return the Solarix's pieces to Ellarien and Remi, who have become determined to lead their own Power Ranger team, and return to their universe.

=== "Forever Rangers" ===
- Go Go Power Rangers #13–20 by Ryan Parrott and Eleonora Carlini.
- Go Go Power Rangers: Forever Rangers by Ryan Parrott and Eleonora Carlini & Francesco Mortarino.

Following the Ranger Slayer's revelation, Matthew Cook implores his girlfriend Kimberly to entrust her secret as a Power Ranger to him, but she refuses to say anything. Disheartened, he breaks up with her and begins distancing himself from the other Rangers.

As the Rangers fight one of Rita's monsters, she casts a spell that sends herself, Jason, and Trini, to another planet. As a result, their Ranger colors are switched. While the other Rangers figure out a way to bring their friends back, Rita visits her estranged daughter, Queen Adriyel, for the Green Power Coin. While Jason and Trini admit their feelings for each other, Kimberly has a failed date with Skull. When Rita and Adriyel have a disagreement, the Rangers intervene, forcing Rita to escape with the Coin.

Billy and Zack receive a visit from a strange robot named Alpha-1, who has been discussing how to protect the universe from Master Vile with Alpha-5. Meanwhile, Rita summons the spirit of her mother, Lady Fienna, to deceive her into unlocking the Green Power Coin's energy. Fienna later realizes this and confronts her daughter. Goldar attacks Angel Grove High to find a person worthy of the Green Power Coin. When Alpha-1 intervenes, he attempts to kill Goldar in cold blood, but the Rangers prevent it; causing Zordon to realize how ruthless and dangerous Alpha-1 is.

When Alpha-1 traps the Rangers in a force field, Goldar reluctantly frees them so they can confront the robot, who self-destructs upon his defeat. With the Green Power Coin's power unlocked, Rita punishes Goldar for his actions and transfers Fienna's soul into it. Kimberly and Matthew give themselves another opportunity to reconcile while Jason trains for a championship against Tommy Oliver.

== Plot ==
=== Part 1 ===
- Go Go Power Rangers #21–32 by Ryan Parrott & Sina Grace and Francesco Mortarino.

After some time fighting alongside the Power Rangers, Tommy Oliver begins to lose his Green Ranger powers and contemplates leaving the team. Aware of Tommy's condition, Lord Zedd (who has usurped his underling Rita and destroyed the Dinozords) plans to take advantage. At night, Jason receives a visit from the Blue Emissary, who not only warns him about the Green Ranger's fate, but also warns him about other people being infected with Morphin Energy after the Morphin Grid was shattered. When Jason tries to consult Zordon, the Blue Emissary incapacitates him and restores his memories of the war against Lord Drakkon; insisting he must do it alone.

Meanwhile, Kimberly discusses Tommy's condition with her ex-boyfriend, Matthew Cook, until Zedd turns the school's pet rabbit into a monster called Warbunny to attack people, though the Rangers turn him back. Following this, Jason tells the Blue Emissary he remembers everything from Lord Drakkon's rampage and had a vision about other people infected with unchecked Morphin Energy.

The Blue Emissary tries to convince Zordon and Alpha-5 to find a new power source for Tommy. Grace Sterling reveals the Command Center has secret rooms. Zack and Trini suspect something is wrong with Jason and demand an answer, but he is unable to locate Zordon and Alpha-5 to help him before they encounter the Blue Emissary, who restores Zack and Trini's memories, so they can join him. Meanwhile, Tommy travels to the Tower of Light, where the White Ranger power is protected by its guardian, Saba, who is doubtful of Tommy. Suddenly, Zedd appears and corrupts Saba into a dark blade, he reveals he stole the Green Ranger's power from Tommy in order to find the Tower before offering him a place in his empire. Tommy refuses and seemingly sacrifices himself to stop Zedd, only to pass out. He later awakens to find Saba, who explains the fight was a test to prove he was worthy to wield the White Light before guiding Tommy back to Earth to aid the other Rangers and their Thunderzords.

After receiving his new powers, Tommy agrees to become the new leader while Jason, Trini and Zack travel to the planet Khoojdah aboard the Spectrum, with the Blue Emissary and his robot companion Xi. After arriving at Khoojdah, they meet Kiya being chased by her people, but the Rangers manage to rescue her in time.

Back on Earth, Zedd plans to power up his zord, Serpentera, by infiltrating Promethea and steal its secrets through the Hodgepodge Hedgehog in search of a dagger that is Promethea's power source but Grace fakes its destruction; Tommy uses the Tigerzord combined with Promethea's Mechazord to destroy the Hodgepodge Hedgehog.

When Zedd unleashes Serpentera on a deserted planet, the reunited Ranger team manage to escape and retrieve the Sword of Light in time. By using it, Jason, Trini and Zack's powers get transferred to new members Rocky DeSantos, Aisha Campbell and Adam Park.

Back on Safehaven, Jason, Trini, Zack and Kiya become Omega Rangers for the first time.

=== Part 2 ===
- Mighty Morphin Power Rangers #40–50 by Ryan Parrott and Daniele Di Nicuolo.

Tommy Oliver (White Ranger), Kimberly, and Billy welcome new members Rocky, Aisha and Adam, who succeed Jason, Trini, and Zack as the Red, Yellow and Black Rangers. While the new Rangers adapt to their new lives, Tommy attempts to become a better leader and acclimate to his new Ranger Power. Meanwhile, Jason, Trini, and Zack are relocated to the planet Safehaven as Omega Rangers to join up with Kiya, Xi, and the Blue Emissary. Together, they travel to Zernox-2, where they confront Garrison Vox, who gained energy powers similar to those augmented by the Morphin Grid. Following his imprisonment, Kiya reveals that she accidentally killed her family after she was infected with Morphin Grid Energy. The Omega Rangers travel to Breel, where an alliance of villains is hosted by Rita Repulsa's estranged daughter, Queen Adriyel. When the Omega Rangers attempt to escape, Adriyel comes close to capturing them until she is killed by Cavotus, a member of her people who had been enslaved and tortured for some time. After the Rangers escape Breel, the Blue Emissary suggests imprisoning Cavotus.

On Earth, Lord Zedd hires a mercenary named Dayne for his next plan. After analyzing the Rangers' data, Dayne disables their blasters and overpowers them. During the fight, Tommy gets injured. In his second encounter, Dayne almost destroys the Thunder Megazord. However, the Omega Rangers arrive in time to capture Dayne, though they cannot reveal their identities to the other Rangers to keep the timeline stable. While Tommy fully recovers, his team debates whether they need help for a similar situation. Meanwhile, Jason persuades the Blue Emissary to let the Omega Rangers attack Lord Zedd's castle on their own. After a brief fight on the Earth's moon, the Omega Rangers capture Zedd. However, Goldar, Squatt, Baboo, and Finster escape with Zedd's broken staff.

Sometime later, Kiya becomes obsessed with preventing Tommy from becoming Lord Drakkon after briefly connecting to Jason's mind and seeing his memories, so she murders the Blue Emissary after they confessed to turning Tommy into the White Ranger and almost destroys Xi. She also frees Garrison Vox and Cavotus from their jars to form her own team, the Anointed, so they can eradicate all Rangers. With Xi's help, Jason, Trini, and Zack travel back to Earth, where they are forced to reveal their identities to the other Rangers and have them tend to an injured Jason.

Following this revelation, both teams are fraught by distrust. While Jason continues recovering, Rocky, Aisha, and Adam offer to help Trini and Zack travel to Safehaven, where Kiya plans on gathering followers for her Anointed. Meanwhile, Tommy argues with Jason about how the latter was forced to lie to everybody, but they later come to terms with returning to Safehaven. When Cavotus attacks Xi's spaceship, Rocky, Aisha, Adam, Trini, and Zack are saved by the Ranger Slayer, who kills Cavotus before explaining her team's journey to the Splintered Star.

In the final battle, Ellarien and Remi, the Solar Rangers, return and use the Solarix to strip the Anointed from their Morphin Energy, Jason and Tommy defeat Garrison Vox, Trini defeats Kiya, and Dayne frees Lord Zedd as they both retreat. The Ranger Slayer and the Solar Rangers return to their respective universes, Kiya and Garrison Vox are locked up, and the rest of the Anointed are forgiven. Jason, Trini and Zack still remain as Omega Rangers while the others receive the unexpected return of Tommy's evil counterpart, Lord Drakkon, who has survived the Shattered Grid's effects, and delivers them a warning about a new threat.

=== Subplots ===
- The Emissaries Three watch over the timeline to make sure it remains stable, but as the Blue Emissary decides to help the Rangers, the Red Emissary looks for Lord Drakkon, but he ends up being murdered by an unknown figure.
- Bulk and Skull seek to broadcast a video about the Rangers, only to rescue four students trapped during a battle, including Skull's new love interest.
- While Rita Repulsa and her minions were trapped inside their prison, they were forced to experience simulations designed to teach them to show empathy toward others.

== Checklist ==
Title / Issue(s)	Writer(s)	Artist(s)	Colorist(s)	Ref.
Mighty Morphin Power Rangers #40–50	Ryan Parrott	Daniele di Nicuolo	Walter Baiamonte and Daniele Ienuso	
Go Go Power Rangers #21–32	Ryan Parrott and Sina Grace	Francesco Mortarino, Daniel Bayliss (#24) and Eduardo Francisco (#28)	Raúl Angulo	

== Future ==
In July 2020, Boom! Studios announced the 2016 Mighty Morphin Power Rangers comic book series would conclude in October 2020, with a new event titled "Unlimited Power" being presented through two new separate series to debut in November 2020.

== See also ==
- Power Rangers (Boom! Studios)
