= Shattered Grid =

2018 comic book event published by Boom! Studios

- Publisher: Boom! Studios (licensed by Saban Brands and later by Hasbro)
- Publication date: February 21 - August 29, 2018
- Genre: Science fiction Superhero
Title(s)
Mighty Morphin Power Rangers #24-30
Go Go Power Rangers #8-12
Mighty Morphin Power Rangers Free Comic Book Day 2018 Special
Mighty Morphin Power Rangers 2018 Annual
Mighty Morphin Power Rangers: Shattered Grid
- Main character: Power Rangers (all eras)

Creative team
- Writer(s): Kyle Higgins; Ryan Parrott; Anthony Burch; Caleb Goellner; Adam Cesare; Becca Barnes; Alwyn Dale
- Penciller(s): Jonas Scharf; Dan Mora; Marcus To; Dylan Burnett; Patrick Mulholland; Hyeonjin Kim; Simone Di Meo; Daniele Di Nicuolo; Diego Galindo
- Inker: Simona di Gianfelice
- Letterer: Ed Dukeshire
- Colorist(s): Joana LaFuente; Raúl Angulo; Matt Herms; Jeremy Lawson; Walter Biamonte; Marcelo Costa
- Editor(s): Dafna Pleban; Matthew Levine; Michael Moccio

"Shattered Grid" is a 2018 crossover comic book event published by Boom! Studios, in collaboration with Saban Brands and Hasbro. Based on the Power Rangers franchise by Haim Saban and Super Sentai by Toei Company, it was mostly written by Kyle Higgins and Ryan Parrott through the ongoing comic series Mighty Morphin Power Rangers and Saban's Go Go Power Rangers to commemorate the 25th anniversary of the original television series.

== Publication history ==
In December 2017, Boom! Studios announced "Shattered Grid" as a crossover event between Mighty Morphin Power Rangers and Saban's Go Go Power Rangers, which would feature teams from all eras.

The main story was mostly written by Kyle Higgins through Mighty Morphin Power Rangers, while Ryan Parrott has also written a tie-in story through Saban's Go Go Power Rangers, featuring Lord Drakkon and the Ranger Slayer as exclusive characters.

In February 2018, an online advertisement promoting the comic was broadcast, featuring Jason David Frank.

In March 2018, a promotional short film titled Power Rangers: Shattered Grid - Dark Prelude was released online, starring Frank in the role of Lord Drakkon. The film was written and directed by Higgins and produced by Locomotion Pictures, RCA Film Productions and Saban Brands.

== Plot ==
=== Prelude ===
In an alternate universe, Tommy Oliver refused to join the Power Rangers and remained loyal to Rita Repulsa; taking the name "Lord Drakkon" after a former acolyte of Rita's. Together, they conquered Earth and killed Zordon, Jason Scott, Billy Cranston, among others. Drakkon also stole all the Power Coins from the Rangers—with the exception of Billy Cranston’s—to create his vast armies of upgraded militarized Ranger Sentries. Among these, he stole the White Ranger Power Coin for himself, fusing it together with his existing Green Ranger powers becoming a White Ranger/Green Ranger hybrid with both powers and twice the strength. He also killed Rita to form his own army, including Scorpina, Finster 5, and a brainwashed Kimberly Hart as the Ranger Slayer. To fight this threat, Zack Taylor and Trini Kwan founded "The Coinless", a resistance movement that opposes Drakkon's regime. Additionally, another Tommy from another universe and his fellow Rangers confronted him, destroying his Power Coin in the process. As they returned to their universe, Drakkon was accidentally transported with them. After his arrival, he was taken prisoner by Promethea agents.

After Promethea held Drakkon in a special top-secret containment facility for an unknown amount of time, Saba appears and tries to kill him. However, he accidentally frees Drakkon, who decapitates Saba and takes his headless sword body to escape.

Arriving in the past, the Ranger Slayer joins forces with Rita Repulsa to power the Gravezord, so she can deliver the Chaos Crystal back to Lord Drakkon.

=== Main story ===
The Time Force Rangers investigate a mysterious rift in the future, but when they get too close, their Time Force Megazord is ravaged and becomes nearly inescapable for Jen Scotts, but they manage to travel to the past. In the present, Jason and Tommy confront Promethea Director Grace Sterling for secretly hiding Lord Drakkon.

Drakkon travels back to the original Rangers' dimension and deceives Ninjor, creator of the Power Coins, into repairing his ranger powers before capturing him in a magic bottle to exploit his knowledge of the Morphin Grid. The Rangers plan their recourse while Billy expresses his desire for Trini's help in making the Black Dragon work again so they can warn the Coinless of Drakkon's return and to fortify the Command Center. Unbeknownst to the Rangers, Drakkon infiltrates the Command Center and steals the Chaos Crystal. Tommy and Kimberly try to find peace during their first date, but she rebuffs him. He starts to leave, only to be attacked by Drakkon for his Ranger energy. Jen joins Kimberly in fighting off Drakkon, but he escapes to his world while Tommy dies in Kimberly's arm. After Zordon confirms his death, the Rangers leave Tommy's body for the police.

Following Tommy's funeral, Jen warns the Rangers that Drakkon's attempt to gain power is causing the Morphin Grid and the timeline to fracture. Zordon contacts the Emissaries to convince the Morphin Masters to remove Drakkon's power, but they rebuke him as they believe that Drakkon and his army are not significant threats to the Morphin Grid. Meanwhile, Drakkon attacks the Samurai Rangers and steals most of their morphers before using Ninjor to transfer their energy to himself and to create a new form of Samurai Sentries to his army, derived from their Blue Ranger. He then goes about murdering all other versions of Tommy, beginning with his Zeo counterpart and creating new Zeo sentries from their Green Ranger.

The Rangers use the Black Dragon and Time Force technology in an effort to contact Dr. K and the RPM Rangers, who have discovered a way to negate the effects of Drakkon's Dragon Cannons. Along the way, they learn that Drakkon has evolved himself and acquired the Psycho Rangers, the S.P.D. A-Squad, and Koragg the Knight Wolf as allies. After the Rangers free Ninjor, he reveals that he is stealing Ranger powers so he can access the Morphin Grid. Meanwhile, Zordon asks Rita for help in stopping Drakkon.

Once they have been gathered, all of the surviving Rangers travel to the Moon using Grace Sterling's space colony to confront Drakkon's forces, encountering newly added White, Silver, and Gold Sentries. Just as Rita suppresses Drakkon's power, Finster 5 electrocutes them, saving Drakkon so he can connect more Ranger energy to himself and evolve into his final form.

=== Tie-in story ===
In the past, the Rangers freed the alternate Kimberly from Drakkon's mind control, inadvertently revealing her identity to their version of Kimberly's late boyfriend, Matthew Cook. She uses an arrow generated by the Chaos Crystal on young Tommy to give him visions of possible futures, including Drakkon murdering him, before traveling to the present to seek asylum under Promethea.

=== Final story ===
The Rangers destroy Drakkon's lunar tower, cutting off his Sentries' power and opening a rift. Using his final form, Drakkon enters the Morphin Grid, defeats the Emissaries, and takes possession of the Morphin Masters' Hearts, destroying the multiverse and creating a world where he is a hero. However, he learns too late that the alternate Kimberly overcharged Tommy's past self with the Chaos Crystal's energy, and when he killed present day Tommy, he transferred his spirit into himself. Tommy's spirit removes himself from Drakkon's body and distracts him to weaken his power enough to free himself and the Emissaries as well as rescue the Rangers. Together, they are able to pull the Heart from Drakkon, causing his world to collapse. Despite Tommy's attempt to help him, Drakkon refuses to be saved and stays in his collapsing world. With the Heart of the Master secured, the Emissaries aid the Rangers in using it to repair the damage Drakkon caused, though they say it cannot be completely fixed.

=== Epilogue ===
While the multiverse and the timestream were fixed, the exact level of repair is currently unknown. Furthermore, Promethea's space station was removed from the space-time continuum; casting Grace, her crew, and the surviving Rangers into uncharted territory.

In the past, Matthew becomes fully aware of the Rangers' identities and implores Kimberly and the others to entrust their secret to him. When they refuse to answer, friction develops between them. Meanwhile, Rita has a new plan to destroy the Rangers once and for all.

== Checklist ==
Title	Issue(s)	Writer(s)	Artist(s)	Colorist(s)
Mighty Morphin Power Rangers	24–30	Kyle Higgins	Jonas Scharf; Daniele Di Nicuolo	Joana LaFuente; Walter Baiamonte
Go Go Power Rangers	8–12	Ryan Parrott	Dan Mora	Raúl Angulo
Mighty Morphin Power Rangers Free Comic Book Day 2018 Special	One-shot	Kyle Higgins & Ryan Parrott	Diego Galindo	Marcelo Costa
Mighty Morphin Power Rangers 2018 Annual	One-shot	Kyle Higgins; Anthony Burch; Caleb Goellner; Adam Cesare; Becca Barnes & Alwyn Dale	Marcus To; Dylan Burnett; Patrick Mulholland; Hyeonjin Kim; Simone Di Meo	Matt Herms; Jeremy Lawson; Raúl Angulo; Joana LaFuente
Mighty Morphin Power Rangers: Shattered Grid	One-shot	Kyle Higgins	Daniele Di Nicuolo & Diego Galindo; Simona di Gianfelice	Walter Biamonte & Marcelo Costa

== Reception ==
"Shattered Grid" has been generally well received by critics, with most reviews praising it as the rightful event for Power Rangers on its 25th anniversary, as well as being a storyline targeted for an adult audience.

== Other media ==
=== Web series ===
The web series Power Rangers Hyperforce features the "Shattered Grid" event for episodes 19 and 20, with guest stars Kyle Higgins and Jason David Frank. The two-part story takes place between issues #25-26 of the 2016 Mighty Morphin Power Rangers comic series.

=== Video game ===
The "Shattered Grid" storyline was adapted for the story mode of the 2019 video game Power Rangers: Battle for the Grid. Original "Shattered Grid" writer Kyle Higgins wrote the game's script.

=== Aborted prestige series ===
The special short trailer released in March 2018 would lead to talks between Higgins and Saban Brands over the possibility of developing a prestige format live-action series based on Drakkon and the World of the Coinless. However, plans came to nothing upon the purchase of the franchise by Hasbro.

== Future ==
In September 2018, the new Mighty Morphin Power Rangers creative team, writer Marguerite Bennett and artist Simone di Meo, introduced a storyline titled "Beyond the Grid". Ryan Parrott continued to write Go Go Power Rangers.

In February 2019, Parrott and artist Daniele Di Nicuolo were introduced as the creative team for Mighty Morphin Power Rangers, starting with issue #40, with a new crossover event titled "Necessary Evil".
