= Power Rangers (comics) =

Comic book series

Publication information
- Publisher: Hamilton Comics (1994–1995); Marvel Comics (1995–1996); Image Comics (1996); Acclaim Comics (1997); Tokyopop (2003–2004); Papercutz (2012–2014); Boom! Studios (2016–2024)
- Genre: Superhero
- Main character(s): Power Rangers

Power Rangers is a series of various comic books spun off from the Power Rangers television show. Each series was published by a different comic book publisher.

== Publication history ==
=== Hamilton Comics (1994–1995) ===
Hamilton Comics published two Mighty Morphin Power Rangers series, totaling ten issues altogether.

A three issue Mighty Morphin Power Rangers Saga mini-series recapped stories from the TV series. Originally planned as six issues, it was abbreviated when the license moved to Marvel Comics.

=== Marvel Comics (1995–1996) ===
Marvel Comics published both comic book and photo comic adaptations of Mighty Morphin Power Rangers: The Movie.

Two Mighty Morphin Power Rangers series were published concurrently. The first series debuted October 1995 and ran for seven issues. The second, titled Mighty Morphin Power Rangers: Ninja Rangers/VR Troopers, was a flip book featuringVR Troopers on the other side; it debuted December 1995 and ran for five issues.

The Power Rangers made a guest appearance in a one-shot Masked Rider comic book, also published by Marvel.

=== Image Comics (1996) ===
In 1996, Image Comics published a comic book based on Power Rangers Zeo. It was written by Mary Bierbaum and Tom Bierbaum, with art by Todd Nauck, Norm Rapmund and Laura Penton. Four issues were drawn, but only one was released before Image Comics lost the license.

A crossover comic with Youngblood was announced but no issues were published.

=== Acclaim Comics (1997) ===
In 1997, Acclaim Comics published the magazine Saban Powerhouse. The magazine lasted only three issues and each featured a comic based on Power Rangers Turbo, one of which was a crossover with Beetleborgs Metallix. Each issue also included comics based other shows owned by Saban Entertainment.

=== Tokyopop (2003–2004) ===
From 2003 to 2004, Tokyopop produced several photo comic adaptations of episodes taken directly from Power Rangers Ninja Storm and Power Rangers Dino Thunder.

=== Papercutz (2014) ===
In 2014, Papercutz produced three separate issues based on Mighty Morphin Power Rangers, after having previously done two issues based on Power Rangers Super Samurai in 2012 and two issues based on Power Rangers Megaforce in 2013.

One of the issues, By Bug... Betrayed, was controversial because of a panel depicting Trini Kwan getting hit by a car. Her real-life actress, Thuy Trang, died in a car crash twelve years before the issue was published. The digital re-release replaces her with Kimberly Hart in an edited version.

=== Boom! Studios (2015–present) ===
In June 2015, Boom! Studios and Saban Brands announced a new comic book series based on Mighty Morphin Power Rangers. The initial creative staff featured Kyle Higgins as the writer, Steve Orlando and Mairghread Scott as co-writers, with Hendry Prasetya and Daniel Bayliss as the artists.

In February 2016, Boom! announced a spin-off limited series entitled Mighty Morphin Power Rangers: Pink by Brenden Fletcher, Kelly Thompson, and Daniele Di Nicuolo.

In April 2017, Boom! announced a prequel series titled Saban's Go Go Power Rangers by Ryan Parrott and Dan Mora. In December 2017, Boom Studios announced "Shattered Grid", a crossover story line between Mighty Morphin Power Rangers and Saban's Go Go Power Rangers, which celebrated the 25th anniversary of Power Rangers.

In July 2018, Hasbro became the new owner of the Power Rangers franchise.

In December 2019, a crossover between Teenage Mutant Ninja Turtles comics by IDW Publishing and Boom!'s Mighty Morphin Power Rangers series titled Mighty Morphin Power Rangers/Teenage Mutant Ninja was released. It had been the second crossover with Boom!'s series after the one with Justice League, Justice League/Mighty Morphin Power Rangers, two years prior.

In March 2019, Boom! announced "Necessary Evil", the second crossover event between Mighty Morphin Power Rangers and Saban's Go Go Power Rangers, written by Ryan Parrott and Sina Grace. Following the impact of the COVID-19 pandemic over comic book industry, the event concluded in June 2020, with Saban's Go Go Power Rangers ending after 32 issues.

The monthly Mighty Morphin Power Rangers series concluded in October 2020 after 55 issues. Two new series titled Mighty Morphin and Power Rangers launched in November featuring a new storyline, "Unlimited Power," with Parrott writing both.

In August 2021, "The Eltarian War" was announced as the conclusion of the "Unlimited Power" event, along with the limited series Power Rangers Universe. Mat Groom became the writer of Mighty Morphin following this crossover.

In April 2022, it was announced that both Mighty Morphin and Power Rangers series would end in August 2022 as part of a special crossover event titled "Charge to 100!" The event would then conclude in September 2022 with the relaunched Mighty Morphin Power Rangers #100, as well as being the final issue written by Ryan Parrott.

In July 2022, it was announced that Melissa Flores would serve as the new writer with art by Simona Di Gianfelce.

== Magazine comic strips ==
In March 2003, Disney Publishing Worldwide produced a short comic strip based on Power Rangers Ninja Storm for their magazine Disney Adventures.

From 2004 to 2009, Future Publishing produced the official Jetix Magazine in the United Kingdom. The magazine featured short comic strips based on several shows aired on Jetix in the United Kingdom including Power Rangers Ninja Storm, Power Rangers Dino Thunder, Power Rangers S.P.D. and Power Rangers Operation Overdrive. The seasons of Power Rangers Mystic Force, Power Rangers Jungle Fury and Power Rangers RPM were also covered in the magazine, but did not receive comic strips.

From 2004 to 2010, Egmont Group produced the official Power Rangers Magazine in the United Kingdom. The magazine featured short comic strips based on Power Rangers Ninja Storm, Power Rangers Dino Thunder, Power Rangers S.P.D., Power Rangers Mystic Force, Power Rangers Operation Overdrive, Power Rangers Jungle Fury and Power Rangers RPM. Many of these comic strips were later collected and re-released worldwide in Annual books.

From 2012 to 2015, Panini Comics produced a revival of the official Power Rangers Magazine in the United Kingdom. The magazine featured short comic strips based on Power Rangers Samurai, Power Rangers Super Samurai, Power Rangers Megaforce and Power Rangers Super Megaforce.

== Sales ==
The first issue of the 2016 Mighty Morphin Power Rangers comic sold approximately 100,000 copies.

== Reception ==
The Mighty Morphin Power Rangers comic has gained mostly positive critical reviews.

== See also ==
- List of comics based on Hasbro properties
