= Power Rangers: Battle for the Grid =

2019 video game

- Developer: nWay
- Publishers: nWay; Lionsgate Games; Limited Run Games
- Series: Power Rangers
- Engine: Unity
- Platforms: Nintendo Switch; Xbox One; PlayStation 4 Microsoft Windows; Google Stadia
- Release: Nintendo Switch, Xbox One; March 26, 2019; PlayStation 4 April 2, 2019; Microsoft Windows; September 24, 2019; Stadia; June 1, 2020
- Genre: Fighting
- Modes: Single-player, versus multiplayer

Power Rangers: Battle for the Grid is a fighting game developed by San Francisco-based game developer nWay, featuring characters from the Power Rangers franchise. It was released digitally for Nintendo Switch and Xbox One on March 26, 2019, for PlayStation 4 on April 2, 2019, for Microsoft Windows on September 24, 2019, and for Stadia on June 1, 2020. Limited Run Games released a standard physical version on the Switch and PlayStation 4 alongside a more expensive Mega Edition, which included a SteelBook case, 18" X 24" poster, and 5 coins in addition to the game. Pre-orders went up for sale in June 2019 with the game delivered in November 2019. In October 2020, Maximum Games published the "Collector's Edition" which included the character Lauren Shiba, both physically and digitally. A third version (physical and digital) the Super Edition containing all previous downloadable content was released digitally in May 2021 and physically in August 2021.

== Gameplay ==
Power Rangers: Battle for the Grid is a fighting game in which players compete in battle using characters with different fighting styles and special attacks. Players select teams of three characters to engage in one-on-one combat, and can choose to switch between them at any point during the match, as well as call teammates to perform assists. Players can also call on Megazords to assist with the battle, via a meter that fills as their team members take damage. When all three opposing teammates have been eliminated, a victory is declared.

The game features Ranked Online, Arcade, Versus, Casual Online, Training and Tutorial modes, along with a Story Mode loosely based on the Power Rangers comic book storyline "Shattered Grid".

=== Playable characters ===
The game features 12 playable characters, with 14 additional characters available as downloadable content.

Mighty Morphin Power Rangers

- Jason Lee Scott - MMPR Red Ranger
- Trini Kwan - MMPR Yellow Ranger (Dragon Armor)^{a}
- Tommy Oliver - MMPR Green Ranger/White Ranger
- Adam Park - MMPR Black Ninja Ranger^{b}^{4}
- Rita Repulsa^{b}^{4}
- Goldar
- Lord Zedd^{b}^{1}
- Scorpina^{b}^{3}

Power Rangers Zeo

- Trey of Triforia - Gold Zeo Ranger^{b}^{1}

Power Rangers Lost Galaxy

- Mike Corbett - Magna Defender

Power Rangers Time Force

- Jen Scotts - Time Force Pink Ranger^{b}^{1}
- Eric Myers - Quantum Ranger^{b}^{2}

Power Rangers S.P.D.

- Anubis "Doggie" Cruger - S.P.D. Shadow Ranger^{b}^{2}
- Kat Manx - S.P.D. Kat Ranger

Power Rangers Mystic Force

- Udonna - White Mystic Ranger^{a}

Power Rangers Jungle Fury

- Robert "RJ" James - Jungle Fury Wolf Ranger^{b}^{3}
- Dai Shi - Black Lion Warrior/Phantom Beast King^{b}^{2}

Power Rangers Samurai

- Lauren Shiba - Red Samurai Ranger^{b}^{3}

Power Rangers Megaforce

- Gia Moran - Super Megaforce Yellow Ranger

Power Rangers Dino Charge

- Poisandra^{b}^{4}

Power Rangers (2017 film)

- Cenozoic Blue Ranger^{a}

Shattered Grid

- Lord Drakkon
- Kimberly Ann Hart - Ranger Slayer/MMPR Pink Ranger
- Mastodon Sentry

Street Fighter

- Ryu - Crimson Hawk Ranger^{b}^{SF}
- Chun-Li - Blue Phoenix Ranger^{b}^{SF}

^a Added via free post-launch update
^b Paid downloadable content character; number denotes which season pass the character is included in

== Plot ==
The Mighty Morphin Power Rangers are training in the Command Center when it is breached by Lord Drakkon, an alternate future version of Tommy Oliver. In his world, Drakkon sided with and trained under Rita Repulsa, before killing her and the other Rangers. Despite the arrival of Time Force Ranger Jen Scotts from the future, Drakkon manages to kill the younger Tommy and escapes. With his Chaos Crystal now charged by Tommy's green chaos energy, Drakkon and his forces begin travelling across time and space, using his Dragon Cannons to remove Rangers' powers and steal their morphers. Zordon sends a warning through the Morphin Grid and, with Jen's help, begins sending Rangers through time to protect other Rangers being pursued by Drakkon.

Kimberly Hart encounters the Ranger Slayer, a future version of herself from Drakkon's universe. Kimberly manages to free her from Drakkon's control, though Ranger Slayer continues to feign loyalty to avert suspicion. The Rangers regroup at Corinth, where Dr. K is working on a way to disrupt the Dragon Cannons. The city comes under attack by Drakkon's forces, including several Power Rangers placed under his control. Drakkon, who has powered himself up using the stolen morphers, arrives and overwhelms the Rangers, forcing them to retreat to the Command Center. Ranger Slayer arrives and reveals Drakkon's plan is to gain full control of the Morphin Grid and rewrite reality, using the morphers to increase his resonance with it. She suggests destroying his tower in their home dimension, preventing him from crossing dimensions and sharing his morphers' powers with his armies. Knowing they will be unable to do so alone, Zordon asks Rita to help stop Drakkon.

Led by Jason Lee Scott, a united group of Power Rangers storms Drakkon's tower. They are attacked by Drakkon and the Rangers under his control, but Mike Corbett is freed by the spirit of the Magna Defender and defects back to Zordon's forces. Rita infiltrates the tower and uses a Powerdraining Candle to weaken Drakkon, forcing him to retreat to stop her. Trini Kwan uses her Dragon Armor to grow and topple the tower's antennae, breaking Drakkon's control of the Rangers and causing his forces to lose their powers. Rita attempts to kill Drakkon, but his minion Finster-5 disarms her and the other Rangers. Finster-5 attempts to stop Drakkon from using additional morphers to restore his powers, believing the process will be fatal, but Drakkon kills him and proceeds. As he powers himself up, he is challenged by Tommy, restored to life through the Chaos Crystal's powers. Tommy defeats Drakkon, whose body has become unstable due to the morphers' power, and he escapes as Drakkon explodes, destroying himself and the tower. Zordon thanks all the Rangers for their help, and Ranger Slayer reassures Tommy that he will never become like Drakkon thanks to his bonds with his team.

== Development and release ==
The game was released in March 2019 for Xbox One and Nintendo Switch, with ports for PlayStation 4 and Microsoft Windows following later in the year. An update in April 2019 added a story mode, written by Boom! Studios Power Rangers comic book writer Kyle Higgins, along with three additional characters, voice acting and two new stages. The original Mighty Morphin Power Rangers actors Jason David Frank (in his final Power Rangers appearance before his death in 2022), Austin St. John, Johnny Yong Bosch, David J. Fielding, Barbara Goodson, Kerrigan Mahan and Sabrina Lu reprise their respective roles as Tommy Oliver (both original universe version, and Lord Drakkon), Jason Lee Scott, Adam Park, Zordon, Rita Repulsa, Goldar and Scorpina, while Power Rangers Time Force actor Daniel Southworth reprises his role as Eric Myers.

An update in July 2019 added three characters via the first season pass, and additional features such as cross-platform play between the Switch, Xbox One, and Windows versions; cross-platform support for PlayStation 4 was added via a later update in February 2020, making it the first fighting game of the eighth generation of video game consoles to support fully platform-agnostic multiplayer. A second season pass was announced alongside the game's Windows release. A third season of content was announced on May 25, 2020. On April 13, 2021, it was announced that Ryu and Chun-Li from Capcom's Street Fighter franchise would be added as playable characters via a "Street Fighter Pack", utilizing their designs from Power Rangers: Legacy Wars. The pack was released on May 25, alongside a digital "Super Edition" version of the game that includes all downloadable content up to that point. A physical release of Super Edition was released in August 2021. A fourth season of content was announced on September 14, 2021.

== Reception ==
Reception

Aggregate score
Aggregator	Score
Metacritic	NS: 62/100; XONE: 53/100; PS4: 65/100

Review scores
Publication	Score
Destructoid	6/10
IGN	6.8/10
Nintendo Life	6/10

Power Rangers: Battle for the Grid has received mixed reviews, with reviewers praising the gameplay but criticizing the presentation and lack of content at launch. IGN gave the game a 6.8 rating, praising the fighting system and tag mechanics but criticizing the graphics, lack of modes and characters. Mike Fahey of Kotaku also criticized the launch roster but praised the accessibility of the fighting mechanics for players at various skill levels. Screen Rant praised the game for using the Marvel vs. Capcom tag-team fighting system while adding new features like the assist-takeover move. They too criticized the lack of characters, non-existent story and highlighted the fact that for a game that was celebrating 25 years of Power Rangers, it only featured characters from four series at launch.
