= Unlimited Power =

Unlimited Power may refer to:

- Unlimited Power (book), a 1986 self-help book by Tony Robbins
- "Unlimited Power" (comics), a 2020–2022 American two-part crossover comic book storyline
