= Power Rangers (Boom! Studios) =

Comic book franchise

- Variant cover by Goñi Montes (Mighty Morphin Power Rangers #0, 2016)

Publication information
- Publisher: Boom! Studios
- Genre: Superhero
- Publication date: February 26, 2016
- No. of issues: 183 (as of November 2022 cover date)
- Main character: Power Rangers

Power Rangers is a comic book franchise published by Boom! Studios, based on the television series of the same name, and based on the Super Sentai series by Toei Company. Initially licensed through Saban Brands in June 2015, the rights moved to Hasbro in July 2018.

== Publication history ==
=== 2016–2024: original continuity ===
==== 2016–2020: phase one ====
In June 2015, Boom! Studios and Saban Brands announced a new comic book series based on Mighty Morphin Power Rangers. The initial creative staff featured Kyle Higgins as the writer, Steve Orlando and Mairghread Scott as co-writers, and Hendry Prasetya and Daniel Bayliss as the artists. Monthly publications of the series started with the release of issue #0 on January 13, 2016.

In April 2017, Boom! announced a new series titled Saban's Go Go Power Rangers, which would be written by Ryan Parrott and have Dan Mora as the artist and would work as a prequel to Mighty Morphin Power Rangers. Aside, both would be become main series for the Power Rangers brand.

In December 2017, Boom Studios announced "Shattered Grid", a crossover storyline between Mighty Morphin Power Rangers and Saban's Go Go Power Rangers. This arc celebrated the 25th anniversary of Power Rangers.

In March 2019, Boom! announced "Necessary Evil", the second crossover event between Mighty Morphin Power Rangers and Saban's Go Go Power Rangers, written by Ryan Parrott and Sina Grace. Following the impact of the COVID-19 pandemic over the comic book industry, the event concluded in June 2020, with Saban's Go Go Power Rangers ending after 32 issues.

==== 2020–2022: phase two ====
The mainline Mighty Morphin Power Rangers series concluded in October 2020 after 55 issues, and in November, it is continued by two new separate series (titled as Mighty Morphin and Power Rangers) that launched a new storyline titled "Unlimited Power".

In August 2021, "The Eltarian War" was announced as the conclusion of the "Unlimited Power" event, along with the limited series Power Rangers Universe. Mat Groom became the writer of Mighty Morphin following this crossover.

In April 2022, it was announced that both Mighty Morphin and Power Rangers series would end in August 2022 as part of a special crossover event titled "Charge to 100!" The event would then conclude in September 2022 with the relaunched Mighty Morphin Power Rangers #100, as well as being the final issue written by Ryan Parrott.

==== 2022–2024: phase three ====
Since October 2022, the relaunched Mighty Morphin Power Rangers series began a new storyline titled "Recharged", starting with issue #101, written by former Director of Power Rangers Development and Production Melissa Flores and drawn by recurring artist Simona Di Gianfelce. Flores considers the storyline as "a dream come true" and that the coming issues will feature "a wild ride that will aim to honor the history of the series, and push the Rangers to their absolute limits."

The second part titled "Darkest Hour" debuted in August 2023 to commemorate the thirtieth anniversary of the Power Rangers franchise. The whole event marked the conclusion of the original Power Rangers comic book continuity.

=== 2024–present ===
In August 2024, it was announced that a new series dubbed Power Rangers Prime would debut on November 14. The series, written by Melissa Flores and illustrated by Michael Yg, serves as a reboot to Boom!'s comic continuity and focuses on Lauren Shiba from Power Rangers Samurai coming to Angel Grove while on the run from the Eltarian police force. It also features characters from VR Troopers. It ended on April 8, 2026, after sixteen issues.

Following the end of Prime, Boom! published an all-new Power Rangers #0 one-shot in May 2, 2026, during Comics Giveaway Day. The one-shot leads to a new relaunch for three separate series: Mighty Morphin Power Rangers: Once a Ranger, Power Rangers Unlimited: Always a Ranger and Power Rangers Green.

== Main setting ==
=== Original continuity (2016–2024) ===
Issues	Title	Description
Phase 1
Power Rangers Universe #1–6		The origin of the Phantom Ranger and his connection to the Morphin Grid is revealed.
Saban's Go Go Power Rangers #1–7		The Power Rangers try to deal with the responsibility of protecting the world from Rita Repulsa's machinations, as well as dealing with their real-life issues.
Saban's Go Go Power Rangers #8–12	"Shattered Grid"	The Ranger Slayer, who is a version of Kimberly from the same alternate timeline as Lord Drakkon, has appeared in the past to deliver her warning.
Saban's Go Go Power Rangers: Back to School		The Rangers experience their own vacation trips while dealing with not giving up their duties to protect Angel Grove.
Saban's Go Go Power Rangers #13–16		Rita visits an estranged relative of hers to get the Green Power Coin, and Jason and Trini are unknowingly dragged along with her.
Mighty Morphin Power Rangers #13-24 back-up story	"The Ongoing Misadventures of Squatt & Baboo"	
Saban's Go Go Power Rangers #17–20	"Forever Rangers"	The Power Rangers meet Alpha 1, the precursor of Alpha 5, who has his own agenda to protect Earth, but Zordon and the others disagree with his methods. Meanwhile, Tommy Oliver comes to Angel Grove for the first time.
Saban's Go Go Power Rangers: Forever Rangers	"Forever Rangers"	The Power Rangers meet Alpha 1, the precursor of Alpha 5, who has his own agenda to protect Earth, but Zordon and the others disagree with his methods. Meanwhile, Tommy Oliver comes to Angel Grove for the first time.
Mighty Morphin Power Rangers #0–16		Tommy Oliver has recently joined the Power Rangers but has been suffering from visions of a possible future where he stays loyal to Rita Repulsa. That revelation leads the Rangers to meet "Lord Drakkon", an evil version of Tommy who came from an alternate universe. However, the Rangers meet new allies on the way including the Coinless, a resistance movement from Drakkon's timeline.
Mighty Morphin Power Rangers #0–12 back-up story	"The Ongoing Adventures of Bulk and Skull"	
Mighty Morphin Power Rangers #17–23		The Power Rangers meet Grace Sterling, the leader of the secret agency known as Promethea who shares a secret past with Zordon and Alpha 5.
Mighty Morphin Power Rangers #24–30	"Shattered Grid"	Once again, Lord Drakkon attempts to look for the Morphin Grid, and his actions cause a tragedy that affects the Power Rangers deeply.
Mighty Morphin Power Rangers Free Comic Book Day 2018 Special	"Shattered Grid"	Once again, Lord Drakkon attempts to look for the Morphin Grid, and his actions cause a tragedy that affects the Power Rangers deeply.
Mighty Morphin Power Rangers 2018 Annual	"Shattered Grid"	Once again, Lord Drakkon attempts to look for the Morphin Grid, and his actions cause a tragedy that affects the Power Rangers deeply.
Mighty Morphin Power Rangers: Shattered Grid	"Shattered Grid"	Once again, Lord Drakkon attempts to look for the Morphin Grid, and his actions cause a tragedy that affects the Power Rangers deeply.
Mighty Morphin Power Rangers #31–39	"Beyond the Grid"	After escaping from Lord Darkkon's warped reality, Grace Sterling and a new team of Power Rangers she has formed get marooned in a dying dimension. In order to uncover mysteries about the Morphin Grid, the new Rangers of Promethea will meet Ellarien, the Solar Ranger, who is at war with "The Praetor" and the Crimson Raiders.
Saban's Go Go Power Rangers #21–32	"Necessary Evil"	Tommy Oliver is losing his Green Ranger power, and the other Rangers must find a way to help him.
Mighty Morphin Power Rangers #40–50	"Necessary Evil"	Tommy is now the White Ranger, leading the team, and introduces new members Rocky DeSantos, Adam Park, and Aisha Campbell, while Jason, Zack, and Trini become Omega Rangers and get relocated to an alien planet.
Mighty Morphin Power Rangers #51–55		The alliance between the Power Rangers and the Omega Rangers could end permanently when Lord Drakkon returns and delivers them a warning. Meanwhile, Lord Zedd reunites with Rita Repulsa to create a team of Dark Rangers.
Power Rangers: Ranger Slayer		The Ranger Slayer returns to her universe, trying to become a hero, but almost everyone there still sees her as a villain.
Power Rangers: Drakkon New Dawn #1–3		Slayer infiltrates Drakkon's fortress to find out what his final plan is.
Phase 2
Mighty Morphin #1–12	"Unlimited Power"	The Power Rangers receive a new Green Ranger as a member while they go after Lord Zedd. Meanwhile, a secret about Zordon's past is revealed.
Power Rangers #1–12	"Unlimited Power"	In order to stop an incoming invasion, the Omega Rangers have no choice but to join forces with Lord Drakkon, even if that means rebelling against Zordon.
Power Rangers Unlimited: Heir to the Darkness	"Unlimited Power"	The origin of how Karone became Astronema is revealed.
Power Rangers Unlimited: Edge of Darkness	"Unlimited Power"	The Phantom Ranger investigates a planet that was destroyed by an ancient evil.
Mighty Morphin #13–16	"The Eltarian War"	Both the Power Rangers and Omega Rangers must put aside their past differences in order to fight against the Eltarian Guardians and the Empyreals.
Power Rangers #13–16	"The Eltarian War"	Both the Power Rangers and Omega Rangers must put aside their past differences in order to fight against the Eltarian Guardians and the Empyreals.
Mighty Morphin #17–22	"Charge to 100!"	The Rangers deal with the aftermath of the Eltarian War, only to find enemies on the Automaton Dominion, the Xurix, and the Death Ranger.
Power Rangers #17–22	"Charge to 100!"	The Rangers deal with the aftermath of the Eltarian War, only to find enemies on the Automaton Dominion, the Xurix, and the Death Ranger.
Power Rangers Unlimited: Countdown to Ruin	"Charge to 100!"	Andros attempts to cure his friend Zhane, while searching of his missing sister Karone.
Power Rangers Unlimited: The Death Ranger	"Charge to 100!"	The origin of how the Gold Omega Ranger became the Death Ranger is revealed.
Mighty Morphin Power Rangers #100	"Charge to 100!"	The Power Rangers make a last stand against the Death Ranger, and a key member makes a drastic decision afterward.
Phase 3
Mighty Morphin Power Rangers #101–110	"Recharged"	The Rangers reunite to tackle new challenges and face new threats, including the return of Rita Repulsa (now renamed as Mistress Vile) and the arrival of Dark Specter.
Power Rangers Unlimited: The Coinless	"Recharged"	Lord Drakkon must reunite a group of unlikely allies in order to save his dimension from Dark Specter.
Power Rangers Unlimited: Hyperforce	"Recharged"	The Hyperforce Rangers must protect the Morphin Grid from the armies of Mistress Vile.
Mighty Morphin Power Rangers #111–122	"Darkest Hour"	The Rangers must confront Mistress Vile and Dark Specter when the Morphin Grid is infected.
Power Rangers Unlimited: The Morphin Masters	"Darkest Hour"	The Ranger Slayer looks for the Morphin Masters with the help of the Pink Emissary, but their search turns an unexpected twist.
Mighty Morphin Power Rangers: Darkest Hour	"Darkest Hour"	The final battle between the Power Rangers and Dark Specter causes an ever-lasting conclusion.

=== First reboot (2024–2026) ===
Issues	Description
Power Rangers Prime #1–16	Lauren Shiba comes to Angel Grove while on the run from the Eltarian police force for being a Power Ranger.
VR Troopers #1–6	The VR Troopers begin to question the role of the Eltarian Empire's rule on Earth.

=== Second reboot (2026–present) ===
Issues	Description
Mighty Morphin Power Rangers: Once a Ranger #1–	The Mighty Morphin team reunite after decades to confront Rita Rabiosa.
Power Rangers Unlimited: Always a Ranger #1–12	To survive her apparent death, Trini Kwan is transported to a far future where she summons a legion of Rangers from other eras.
Power Rangers Green #1–5	In another future, Tommy Oliver lives as the last Ranger standing on Earth.

== Other settings ==
=== Tie-in stories ===
Issues	Title	Description
Mighty Morphin Power Rangers: Pink #1–6		Kimberly Hart travels to France, so she can rescue her mother and stepfather, only to cross paths with Goldar.
Mighty Morphin Power Rangers #25–36 back-up story	"The New Adventures of Blue Senturion & Ninjor"	
Mighty Morphin Power Rangers: The Return #1–4		Set in an alternate timeline, the original Mighty Morphin Power Rangers (Jason, Billy, Zack, Kimberly, Trini, and Tommy) defeated Rita and Lord Zedd in 2001, but not without heavy costs. Now, 22 years later, the team has to reunite to discover what happened to Jason, who has been operating as a lone vigilante.
Power Rangers Infinity		In response to the Darkest Hour, new Ranger teams emerge.

==== Tie-in anthologies ====
Standalone stories set throughout the Power Rangers universe:

- Mighty Morphin Power Rangers 2016 Annual
- Mighty Morphin Power Rangers 2017 Annual
- Mighty Morphin Power Rangers 25th Anniversary Special
- Mighty Morphin Power Rangers 30th Anniversary Special
- Power Rangers: Across the Grid

==== Tie-in graphic novels ====
Issues	Description
Power Rangers: Soul of the Dragon	An older Tommy Oliver tries to find his son, an S.P.D. officer, who has gone missing after an undercover mission goes wrong.
Power Rangers: The Psycho Path	Andros and Karone deal with the return of the Psycho Rangers, while Karone deals with her evil persona Astronema.
Power Rangers: Sins of the Future	Time Force members Wes Collins and Jen Scotts try to have a relationship, but they are chased by someone who warns them about the consequences of their actions.

=== Crossovers ===
Issues	Description
Justice League (DC Comics)
Justice League/Mighty Morphin Power Rangers #1–6	The Power Rangers try to rescue Zack Taylor, who was accidentally transported to the DC Universe, where they join forces with the Justice League in order to confront an alliance between Lord Zedd and Brainiac.
Teenage Mutant Ninja Turtles (IDW Publishing/Nickelodeon)
Mighty Morphin Power Rangers/Teenage Mutant Ninja Turtles #1–5	When the Power Rangers meet the Ninja Turtles, both teams must discover why Tommy Oliver joined forces with the Foot Clan.
Mighty Morphin Power Rangers/Teenage Mutant Ninja Turtles II #1–5	The Power Rangers and Ninja Turtles must unite again against a new threat, with Casey Jones joining the Foot Clan for unknown reasons.
Mighty Morphin Power Rangers/Teenage Mutant Ninja Turtles III #1–5	TBA
Godzilla (IDW Publishing/Toho)
Godzilla vs. Mighty Morphin Power Rangers #1–5	In her attempt to find a world without Power Rangers, Rita Repulsa travels to the world of Godzilla, but the Power Rangers have already followed her, leading them to confront the King of the Monsters.
Godzilla vs. Mighty Morphin Power Rangers II #1–5	The Power Rangers must join forces with Godzilla against Astronema and the Phycho Rangers.
Usagi Yojimbo (Dark Horse Comics/Dogu Publishing)
Mighty Morphin Power Rangers/Usagi Yojimbo	The Rangers are transported to Japan during Edo perioid, where the mysterious Ogasawara deceives them to go after Usagi Yojimbo.

=== Other continuities ===
Issues	Description
Power Rangers: Aftershock	The novel is set after the events of the 2017 Power Rangers film. The Power Rangers deal with the aftermath of Goldar's rampage, only to cross paths with a secret government agency named Apex.
Ranger Academy #1–12	13-year-old Sage lives on an isolated lunar colony with her adoptive father, but her days on the farm will change forever when she comes across a wreckage with wounded passengers, people from an academy training to be something called...Power Rangers!

== See also ==
- Power Rangers (comics)
- List of comics based on Hasbro properties
