= Austin St. John =

American actor (born 1974)

- St. John at Animate! Philadelphia in 2026
- Born: Jason Lawrence Geiger; September 17, 1974 (age 52); Roswell, New Mexico, U.S.
- Education: Concordia University
- Occupations: Actor; Martial artist
- Years active: 1993–present
- Known for: Jason Lee Scott in Power Rangers
- Children: 3
- Website: austinstjohn.biz

Jason Lawrence Geiger (born September 17, 1974), professionally known as Austin St. John, is an American actor and martial artist best known for his portrayal of Jason Lee Scott in the Power Rangers franchise.

== Biography ==
Austin St. John is the son of U.S. Marine and martial artist Steve John and his wife, Sharon.

His first acting role and most well-known role to date was at 17 years old, when he was cast as teen superhero Jason Lee Scott, the Red Power Ranger in Mighty Morphin Power Rangers, the first installment of the Power Rangers franchise, which debuted on Fox Kids in 1993. For his role, he took the stage name Austin St. John, Austin coming from The Six Million Dollar Man's Steve Austin and St. John being a name of his own choosing. In 2020, St. John reprised the role of Jason in a second-season episode of Power Rangers Beast Morphers titled "Grid Connection".

Austin St. John began as a proficient martial artist, holding a second-degree black belt in Taekwondo, a first-degree black belt in Judo and a first-degree black belt in Kenpo and for a time, he worked as a martial arts instructor.

In February 2024, he announced plans to start a "warrior"-inspired clothing line featuring quotes from prominent historical figures, including Adolf Hitler. This drew fierce condemnation from fans, as well as Amy Jo Johnson, who costarred in the series as Kimberly Hart, the Pink Ranger.

== Personal life ==
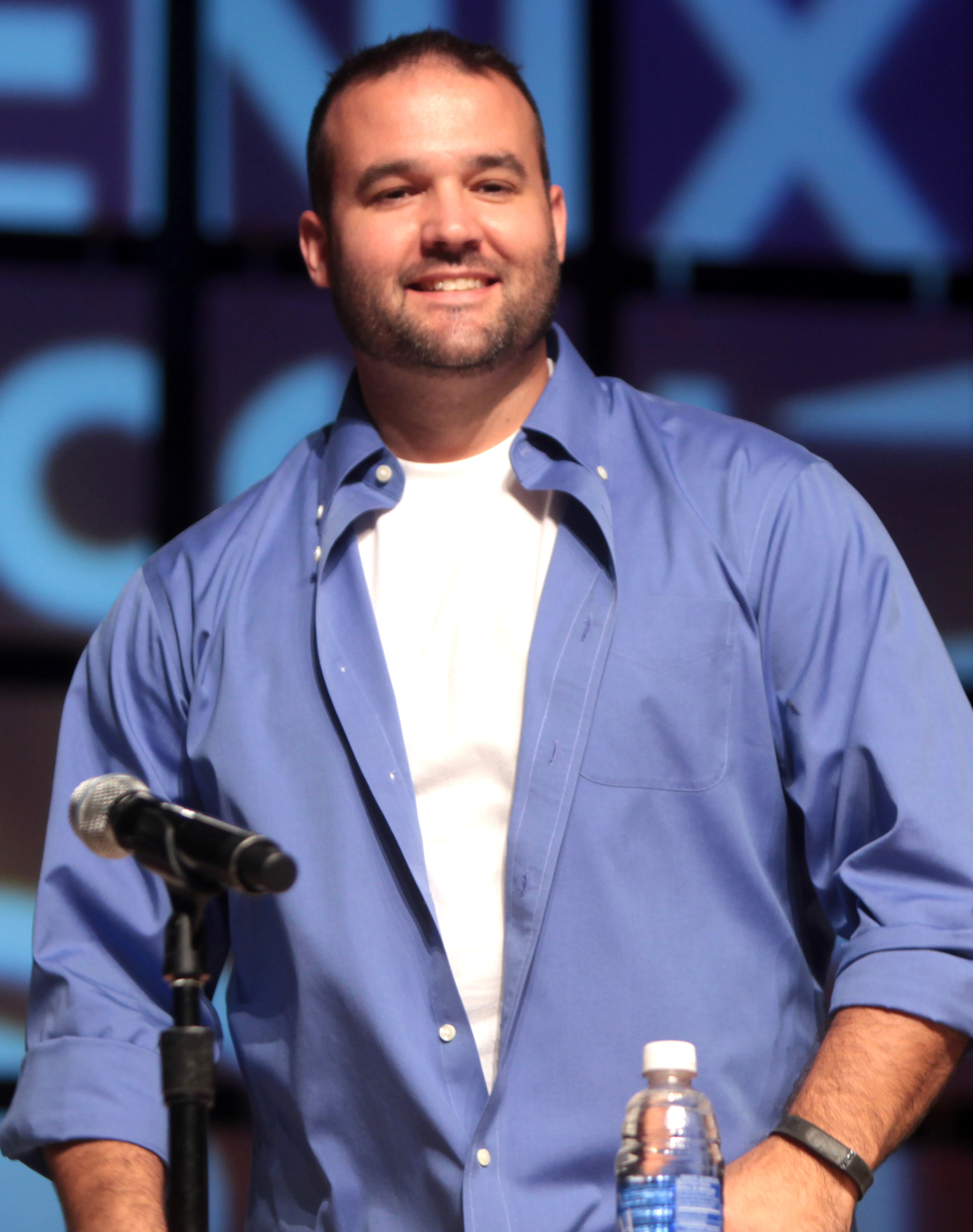
St. John in 2014

Austin St. John attended Robert Frost Middle School and W.T. Woodson High School in Fairfax, Virginia, before moving to Fullerton, California, where he attended Sunny Hills High School, but did not graduate. As an adult, he went on to earn his G.E.D. and ultimately obtained his undergraduate degree from Concordia University. He is married and has 3 children.

=== CARES Act indictment ===
In May 2022, St. John was indicted on federal criminal charges related to the CARES Act. He allegedly conspired in a $3.5 million scheme to create businesses or use an existing business to submit applications to fraudulently obtain Paycheck Protection Program funding. Prosecutors said participants in the conspiracy would file false supporting documentation and misrepresent key details, including the number of their employees and the amount of their payroll, causing the Small Business Administration and financial institutions to issue loans. Prosecutors alleged St. John and co-defendants paid the ringleaders of the scheme, and spent the money on personal purchases. The charges carried a maximum sentence of 20 years.

St. John pleaded guilty to the charges on April 22, 2024, as part of a plea agreement, the notice of which was published on May 1. On May 1, 2025, St. John was sentenced to five years of probation and ordered to pay over $225,000 in restitution.

== Filmography ==
=== Film ===
Year	Film	Portraying	Notes
1995	Encyclopedia of Martial Arts: Hollywood Celebrities	Himself	
1997	Turbo: A Power Rangers Movie	Jason Lee Scott	
2009	Steps Toward the Sun	Cowboy	Short film
2016	Gideon's Frontier	Simon Kenton	Short film
2016	Tres Leches	Officer Jed	
2017	The Order	Jack	Unreleased
2017	Survival's End		
2017	Monsters at Large	Sean Parker	
2017	A Gift of the Heart		
2019	A Walk with Grace	Duane Shaffer	

=== Television ===
Year	Title	Role	Notes
1993–1994	Mighty Morphin Power Rangers	Jason Lee Scott / Red Ranger	Main role (Season 1–2)
1996	Power Rangers Zeo	Jason Lee Scott / Gold Zeo Ranger	Recurring role
1998	Exposé	Detective Anderson	Television film
2002	Power Rangers Wild Force	Jason Lee Scott / Red Ranger	Episode: "Forever Red"
2020	Power Rangers Beast Morphers	Jason Lee Scott / Red Ranger	Episode: "Grid Connection"
2023	Mighty Morphin Power Rangers: Once & Always	Jason Lee Scott / Red Ranger	30th Anniversary special (Archival footage only)

=== Video games ===
Year	Game	Portraying	Notes
2019	Power Rangers: Battle for the Grid	Jason Lee Scott / Red Ranger	Voice-over role
