= Recharged (comics) =

- Publisher: Boom! Studios
- Publication date: October 26, 2022 – August 21, 2024
- Genre: Science fiction; Superhero
Title(s)
- Part 1: "Rise of Dark Specter"
- Mighty Morphin Power Rangers (vol. 2) #101–110
- Power Rangers Unlimited: The Coinless
- Power Rangers Unlimited: Hyperforce
- Part 2: "Darkest Hour"
- Mighty Morphin Power Rangers (vol. 2) #111–122
- Power Rangers Unlimited: The Morphin Masters
- Mighty Morphin Power Rangers: Darkest Hour
- Epilogue
- Power Rangers Infinity

Creative team
- Writers: Adam Cesare; Meghan Camarena; Melissa Flores; Ryan Parrott; Rachel Wagner
- Artists: Daniel Bayliss; Simona Di Gianfelce; Moisés Hidalgo; Hendry Prasetya; Federico Sabbatini
- Letterer: Ed Dukeshire
- Colorists: Raúl Angulo; Matt Herms; Arthur Hesli; Bryan Valenza
- Editor: Allyson Gronowitz

"Recharged" is a 2022–2024 American two-part comic book crossover event mainly written by Melissa Flores and published by Boom! Studios, being based on the Power Rangers franchise by Hasbro and Toei Company, which is based on Super Sentai by Toei Company.

The first part titled "Rise of Dark Specter" debuted in October 2022, while the second part titled "Darkest Hour" debuted in August 2023 in order to commemorate the thirtieth anniversary of the original television series, which concluded with the Dino Fury/Cosmic Fury seasons and the Once & Always film.

The whole event marks the conclusion of the original continuity in the Power Rangers comic line by Boom!

== Publication history ==
In March 2022, Boom! Studios announced a new storyline titled "Recharged", with former Director of Power Rangers Development and Production Melissa Flores (as writer) and recurring artist Simona Di Gianfelce serving as the new creative team of the relaunched Mighty Morphin Power Rangers series, starting with issue #101 in October 2022.

Additionally, two one-shot issues titled Power Rangers Unlimited: The Coinless and Power Rangers Unlimited: Hyperforce were released in June 2023; both issues feature the return of characters from previous comic events, and the cast from the Power Rangers Hyperforce web series.

The second part titled "Darkest Hour" debuted on August 23, 2023 in order to commemorate the thirtieth anniversary of the original television series. Additionally, a one-shot titled Power Rangers Unlimited: The Morphin Masters was released in January 2023. The event concluded with the Mighty Morphin Power Rangers: Darkest Hour one-shot on July 31, 2024.

== Premise ==
Following their fight against the Death Ranger and the departure of Jason Lee Scott, (Note: As depicted in "Charge to 100!" (2022).) both the Power Rangers and Omega Rangers must confront the return of Rita Repulsa, who wants to ensure the arrival of Dark Specter on Earth. In the middle of this, old enemies join forces to face the threat before the Morphin Grid gets infected.

== Titles involved ==
| Title | Issue(s) | Creative team | | | Release schedule | |
| Title | Issue(s) | Writer(s) | Artist(s) | Colorist(s) | Premiere date | Finale date |
Part 1: "Rise of Dark Specter"
| Mighty Morphin Power Rangers (vol. 2) | #101–110 | Melissa Flores | Simona Di Gianfelce | Raúl Angulo | October 26, 2022 | July 26, 2023 |
| Power Rangers Unlimited: The Coinless | One-shot | Adam Cesare | Moisés Hidalgo | Arthur Hesli | June 28, 2023 | |
| Power Rangers Unlimited: Hyperforce | One-shot | Meghan Camarena; Melissa Flores | Federico Sabbatini | Bryan Valenza | July 19, 2023 | |
Part 2: "Darkest Hour"
| Mighty Morphin Power Rangers (vol. 2) | #111–122 | Melissa Flores | Simona Di Gianfelce; Hendry Prasetya (#121) | Raúl Angulo; Matt Herms (#121) | August 23, 2023 | July 24, 2024 |
| Power Rangers Unlimited: The Morphin Masters | One-shot | Ryan Parrott; Rachel Wagner | Daniel Bayliss | Arthur Hesli | January 31, 2024 | |
| Mighty Morphin Power Rangers: Darkest Hour | One-shot | Melissa Flores | Simona Di Gianfelce | Raúl Angulo; Jose Enrique Fernández | July 31, 2024 | |

== Reception ==
"Recharged" received mostly positive reviews, praising Flores' writing as the introduction of a new era of Power Rangers comics.

"Darkest Hour" also received positive critics, being praised as a proper event for the franchise's thirtieth anniversary.

== Collected editions ==
| Title | Material collected | Publication date | ISBN |
|---|---|---|---|
| Mighty Morphin Power Rangers: Recharged Vol. 1 | Mighty Morphin Power Rangers (vol. 2) #100–102 | April 25, 2023 | 1684158958, 978-1684158959 |
| Mighty Morphin Power Rangers: Recharged Vol. 2 | Mighty Morphin Power Rangers (vol. 2) #103–106 | August 29, 2023 | 168415913X, 978-1684159130 |
| Power Rangers Unlimited: Call to Darkness | Power Rangers Unlimited: The Coinless; Power Rangers Unlimited: Hyperforce | October 10, 2023 | 1608861392, 978-1608861392 |
| Mighty Morphin Power Rangers: Recharged Vol. 3 | Mighty Morphin Power Rangers (vol. 2) #107–110 | December 26, 2023 | 1608861066, 978-1608861064 |
| Mighty Morphin Power Rangers: Recharged Vol. 4 | Mighty Morphin Power Rangers (vol. 2) #111–114 | April 30, 2024 | 1608861570, 978-1608861576 |
| Mighty Morphin Power Rangers: Recharged Vol. 5 | Mighty Morphin Power Rangers (vol. 2) #115–118 | September 3, 2024 | 1608862496, 978-1608861576 |
| Mighty Morphin Power Rangers: Recharged Vol. 6 | Mighty Morphin Power Rangers (vol. 2) #119–122; Mighty Morphin Power Rangers: Darkest Hour | November 19, 2024 | 163796983X, 978-1637969830 |
| Power Rangers Unlimited: Forever Rangers | Mighty Morphin Power Rangers 30th Anniversary Special; Power Rangers Unlimited: The Morphin Masters | December 17, 2024 | 1684155916, 978-1684155910 |

== Aftermath and reboot ==
Following the end of the "Recharged" event, a tie-in epilogue titled Power Rangers Infinity was released on August 21, 2024, written by Sam Humphries, drawn by Ro Stein and Ted Brandt, and colored by Tríona Farrell.

A new ongoing series titled Power Rangers Prime, with Flores returning as writer, and featuring art by Michael Yg and Fabi Marques, debuted on November 13, 2024, and is a reboot of the previous Powers Rangers comic continuity.
