= Billy Cranston =

Fictional character in Power Rangers

- Power Rangers character
- David Yost as Billy Cranston
- First appearance: Day of the Dumpster (Mighty Morphin Power Rangers)
- Last appearance: The End (Power Rangers Cosmic Fury)
- Portrayed by: David Yost (teenager and adult); Billy Nilles (child, season 1); Justin Timsit (child, seasons 2-3); William Frederick Knight (old, Zeo); RJ Cyler (2017 reboot)
- Voiced by: Dan Amrich (Rita's Rewind)

In-universe information
- Title(s): Blue Power Ranger; Blue Ninja Ranger
- Home: Earth
- Color(s): Blue
- Status: Active
- Zords: Triceratops Dinozord; Unicorn Thunderzord; Wolf Ninjazord; Blue Shogunzord

Billy Cranston is a fictional character in the Power Rangers universe. He is the Blue Ranger (triceratops) in the series Mighty Morphin Power Rangers, and was portrayed by actor David Yost. Billy is the only original Power Ranger to remain for the entire MMPR series, and is the second longest-serving Ranger overall behind Tommy Oliver. Until his departure, he is considered the brains of the Power Rangers team, creating many gadgets with which to solve problems that not even Zordon foresees, and he even invents the first team's wrist-worn communication devices. A reimagined version of Billy, now African-American, appears in the 2017 reboot film, played by actor RJ Cyler.

== Character history ==
=== Television ===
==== Mighty Morphin Power Rangers ====
Billy is one of the five "teenagers with attitude" selected by Zordon to become the original Power Rangers, along with Jason Lee Scott, Zack Taylor, Trini Kwan and Kimberly Hart. Billy becomes the Blue Power Ranger and is given both the Triceratops Power Coin and the Triceratops Dinozord.

Billy begins the series as the stereotypical "nerd", often using his vast intelligence to aid the team. Billy later evolves to become a stronger, more confident individual. In the episode "High Five", Billy creates the wrist communicators the Power Rangers use, and the interface that allows the devices a remote access to the Command Center's teleportation unit.

Billy was revealed to have developed icthyophobia (fear of fish) due to an incident in his youth, but overcomes it after a plot by Rita Repulsa to use it against him.

Billy as the Blue Power Ranger.

In Season 2, Billy commands the Unicorn Thunderzord, and in season 3, gains new powers from Ninjor, who gives him the Wolf Power Coin, and becomes the Blue Ninja Ranger.

==== Mighty Morphin Alien Rangers ====
The Rangers are de-aged by a time reversal spell performed by Rita Repulsa's father, Master Vile. Billy devises a plan to restore the Rangers' ages using a machine that ran off the power coins. Billy restores himself, but Rita and Goldar steal the machine, and Lord Zedd and Rita Repulsa destroy all six Ninja Power Coins. With his Wolf Ninja Coin destroyed and his Triceratops Power Coin damaged beyond use, Billy's role changes. He no longer fights as a Power Ranger, but rather acts solely in an advisory and supporting role. Indeed, Billy is the only Ranger in this period still to be acted out by his regular actor – the others had been replaced temporarily by child actors after Master Vile had used the Orb of Doom to revert time by approximately ten years. Billy acts in this period as a liaison between the Aquitian Rangers and Earth. It is the cure for Billy's reverse-aging that eventually serves as the plot device by which he is removed from the show.

==== Power Rangers Zeo ====
When Power Rangers Zeo begins, Billy officially retires from active Ranger service as the six-man team now only have the five segments of the Zeo Crystal as a power source for each member. Based on his recent experience basically working as a technical advisor for the active Rangers, Billy allows new member Tanya to take his place while he continus his supporting role by creating and maintaining most of the weaponry, gadgets and Zords the Zeo Rangers use.

The writers left the choice open as to whether or not Billy would become a Zeo Ranger, with him musing at the start of Zeo that he could always assume the Zeo power in an emergency. He graduates earlier than the rest of the team in "Graduation Blues", and then leaves Earth to address problems on the planet Aquitar. In "Mr. Billy's Wild Ride", he returns to Earth, but is attacked by the machine empire along the way and nearly captured.

Before the Gold Ranger's identity is revealed as Trey of Triforia, the writers left red herrings to mislead the viewers into believing that the Gold Ranger is Billy, since he is never around when the Gold Ranger is active. When Trey of Triforia is injured and unable to continue acting as the Gold Ranger, Billy is selected to assume the Gold Ranger's powers while Trey returned to Triforia on sabbatical to try to unify his three selves. However, the negative proton energy that his body absorbed in the Command Center's explosion prevents Billy from taking the powers. Instead Jason Lee Scott, the former Red Ranger, receives the powers.

In "Mondo's Last Stand", it is shown that Billy has worked his way up to a black belt in karate.

Billy is last seen in the two-part crossover episode, suffering from accelerated aging, a side effect from the regenerator he used to restore his proper age. To counter this, he travels to Aquitar for a cure from their Eternal Falls (analogous to the Fountain of Youth), which restores his real age; after that he opts to remain there with Cestria, a female Aquitian with whom he had fallen in love.

==== Power Rangers Super Megaforce ====
During the final episode of Power Rangers Super Megaforce - Legendary Battle - Billy participates in the eponymous battle as the Blue Mighty Morphin Power Ranger alongside other past and present Power Rangers. Yost does not reprise the role for this morphed appearance.

==== Power Rangers Beast Morphers ====
Billy makes another morphed appearance as the Blue Mighty Morphin Power Ranger for a second season episode of Power Rangers Beast Morphers - Grid Connection. The episode saw Austin St. John reprise the role of Jason Lee Scott, the Red Mighty Morphin Power Ranger. Jason summons the other four core Mighty Morphin Power Rangers and the original three Dino Thunder rangers to join him and the Dino Charge rangers in battling a resurrected Goldar Maximus. Again, Yost did not return; Billy has no dialogue and remains morphed throughout the appearance.

==== Mighty Morphin Power Rangers: Once & Always ====
For Hasbro PulseCon 2022, David Yost announced he would reprise the role of Billy to mark the 30th anniversary of the Power Rangers franchise. Mighty Morphin Power Rangers: Once and Always was released on Netflix on April 19, 2023.

In the special, set 30 years after Zordon recruited the original Mighty Morphin Power Rangers, Billy is now the founder and CEO of Cranston Technologies, which operates a secret Power Rangers command center under its headquarters. While attempting to re-establish contact with Zordon, Billy accidentally restores the evil spirit of Rita Repulsa, which takes over the body of Alpha 8 and becomes Robo-Rita. In the ensuing battle, Rita fires an energy blast at Billy which is intercepted by Trini, killing the Yellow Ranger in the process.

When Trini's daughter Minh blames him for her mother's death, Billy works to correct his mistakes until, a year later, Rita reappears and captures Tommy, Jason, and Kimberly. She plans to drain their energy to power a time machine that will allow her to contact her past self and alter the timeline in her favor.

Billy leads the remaining Mighty Morphin' Power Rangers - a team consisting of himself, Zack, Kat and Rocky - to thwart Rita's plan. Meanwhile, Minh steals Trini's morpher to join the fight but finds herself unable to use it and gets captured. Billy attempts to rescue her and Minh sacrifices herself to prevent him suffering the same fate as Trini. This action bonds her to the Sabre-Toothed Tiger Power Coin, which saves her and allows her to morph into the Yellow Mighty Morphin' Power Ranger. Billy instructs her on piloting the Megazord to defeat Rita's minions and the pair reconcile. It is then revealed that Billy and Cestria are still together and he decides, once he's dealt with some business matters on Earth, to resume his intergalactic travels.

==== Power Rangers Cosmic Fury ====
Yost reprised his role as Billy in Power Rangers Cosmic Fury, the 30th and, as of 2025, final season of Power Rangers. The Dino Fury rangers encounter Billy on a distant planet fighting the forces of a resurrected Lord Zedd. Billy allies himself with the younger Rangers, serving as a mentor, and helps create new powers for the team when their old ones are destroyed, turning them into the Cosmic Fury rangers. Since the events of Once and Always, Billy has given up his search for Zordon, until one of the Cosmic Fury Rangers reports encountering a mysterious being who quotes Zordon's famous catchphrase - "May the power protect you" - and his hope of finding his old mentor is renewed.

=== Film ===
==== Mighty Morphin Power Rangers: The Movie (1995) ====
Yost reprises the role of Billy for Mighty Morphin Power Rangers: The Movie, released in 1995. In the film, the Power Rangers lose their powers after an encounter with the new villain Ivan Ooze (Paul Freeman). The Rangers go on a quest to restore their powers and save Zordon's life in the process. The events of the movie are non-canon to the television series, although a similar scenario, without Ivan Ooze appearing, plays out in the "Ninja Quest" story arc early in the third season.

==== Power Rangers (2017) ====
A reimagined version of Billy appears in the 2017 film Power Rangers, played by actor RJ Cyler. In this version, Billy is African American, and is specifically stated to be autistic.

=== Comics ===
==== Mighty Morphin Power Rangers: Pink ====
Kimberly is the main character in this comic book mini series published by Boom! Studios. The series is a modern remake but also serves as a continuation from Kimberly's exit in the third season of Mighty Morphin Power Rangers.

==== Power Rangers (Boom! Studios) ====
The Boom! Studios comics feature Billy as a major character back in the original era, the series starting shortly after the battle with the Green Ranger.

== Behind the scenes ==
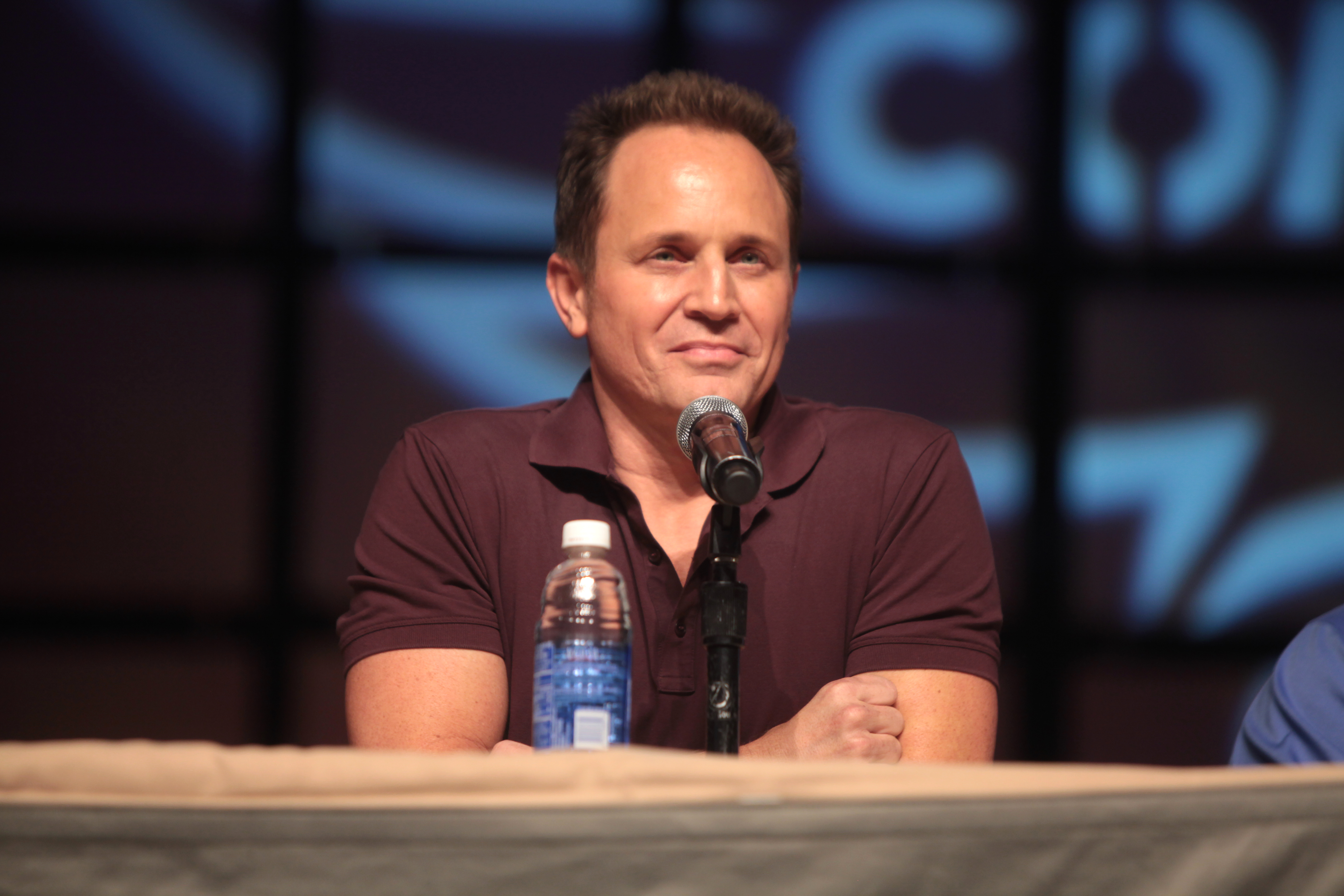
David Yost in 2014

David Yost has stated he had walked off the show a few episodes prior to his character's departure, due to repeated and ongoing homophobic slurs by the creators, producers, directors, and writers of the series, which is why he does not appear in them. However, producer Scott Page-Pagter has denied these statements, claiming Yost left over a salary dispute and had conflicts with members of the crew. As a result, stock footage of Yost was used for his departure and the character was voiced by someone else (In broadcasting Billy's departing message to his friends, it was mentioned they were having trouble with the signal). He was also the last of the original Power Ranger team to leave the show, although his former teammate Jason had returned as the Gold Ranger at that time.

It was widely believed that Billy's surname came from Bryan Cranston, who did voice work for Mighty Morphin' Power Rangers, and would later portray Zordon in the 2017 film. Bryan Cranston was told this and it was later confirmed to him from an unknown source. However, in recent years, promotional material for an attempted Bioman adaptation by Haim Saban, from 1984, revealed that the surname was decided on long before Cranston became involved with the series.
