= Rita Repulsa =

Fictional character

- Power Rangers character
- Rita as she appears in the first season of Mighty Morphin Power Rangers; her scenes are entirely based on footage of Machiko Soga's Witch Bandora character from Kyōryū Sentai Zyuranger.
- First appearance: "Day of the Dumpster" (Mighty Morphin Power Rangers) (as Rita Repulsa)
- Last appearance: "The End" (Power Rangers Cosmic Fury) (as Mystic Mother); Mighty Morphin Power Rangers: Once & Always (as Robo-Rita Repulsa)
- Portrayed by: Machiko Soga (1993–94, 2006); Carla Perez (1994–98); Julia Cortez (1995 film); Unknown (2023); Elizabeth Banks (2017 film)
- Voiced by: Barbara Goodson (1993–98, 2023); Susan Brady (2006, 2023); Ally Dixon (Rita's Rewind)

In-universe information
- Home: M51 Galaxy

Rita Repulsa is a character from the television series Mighty Morphin Power Rangers, and the principal nemesis of the superhero protagonists in the show's first season. She is portrayed in the first season by Machiko Soga (via Zyuranger footage as Witch Bandora) and by Carla Perez in the remaining seasons, while voiced by Barbara Goodson in the series. Soga reprised her role as Rita, now the Mystic Mother, while Susan Brady provided her voice in the TV series Power Rangers Mystic Force. In the films, she is portrayed by Julia Cortez in Mighty Morphin Power Rangers: The Movie, and by Elizabeth Banks in the 2017 reboot film. Rita Repulsa is based on the Kyōryū Sentai Zyuranger villain Witch Bandora.

== Character attributes ==
=== Origins ===
Rita Repulsa is an evil space witch bent on ruling the universe. Various sources describe her as an alien or an intergalactic being. Being a powerful sorceress, Rita has conquered many worlds and amassed a large collection of monsters and Putty Patrollers to do her bidding. During her reign of terror, she led a group of minions to conquer Earth.

Imprisoned in a space dumpster by a sage named Zordon, Rita was cast into space where she would float for ten thousand years before arcing back to the Moon in 1993. Once freed by two astronauts, she and her minions reclaimed their headquarters and started a second campaign on Earth to defeat Zordon and take the planet for Lord Zedd. She is the first major villain of the Power Rangers franchise.

=== Appearance and personality ===
Most discernible by her two pointed hair cones, one may also recognize her by her screeching voice, Madonna-like cone bra, and obnoxious attitude: her appearance in the early screen adaptations is described as follows: "a visibly Asian witch/goddess who wears a horned headdress and pointy conical devices over her breasts". She is sarcastic and power hungry, her character would usually become humorous whenever the Power Rangers defeated her; this would usually end with the catchphrase "I've got such a headache!" As Rita then married Lord Zedd later on in the series, her humorous personality was increased (usually arguing with Zedd or her father, Master Vile).

Rita is sometimes seen arguing with her younger brother, Rito, whose skeletal appearance was comically revealed on her account. He knew she was picky in gifts being given to her. Rita wanted a nice little planet to take over and Rito offended her by giving her a fire-breathing dragon instead. She used the dragon to attack him and burn their parents house to prove her point.

Years after several defeats across the Universe, Rita was turned away from evil thanks to Zordon's Good energy wave. Rita then adopted a new title, Mystic Mother, and began to practice good magic. While confronted by evil, Mystic Mother proved stronger and was able to aid the Power Rangers Mystic Force in eradicating dark magic.

=== Powers ===
Being a powerful witch, Rita possessed many magical abilities. By far the most common demonstration of her power was her use of her "wand" (actually an ornate staff) to make her monsters and minions grow to enormous sizes. Rita has also used magical rituals to control humans to do her bidding and even turn them evil, at least temporarily (Tommy Oliver and Katherine Hillard being the most prominent examples). She can also trap people in other dimensions and shoot energy blasts, like most villains from the "Zordon era", teleport at will, though only at relatively short range (i.e., from the Moon to Earth and back, but not from Earth to another planet). Rita was also able to create her own Power Ranger, but she accomplished this by simply giving a Power Coin to an individual she had brainwashed to be evil, rather than facilitate a connection to the Morphing Grid herself.

In the 2006 series Power Rangers Mystic Force she is the ruler of all good magic and can use that magic to defend herself if and when she needs to. She is also capable of facilitating a connection to the Universal Morphing Grid to create a full team of Power Rangers if necessary, hence the Mystic Force. As the Mystic Mother, Rita takes a behind-the-scenes role, ensuring the flow of good magic throughout the world rather than using it herself, unless she has no other choice.

=== Portrayals ===
The character of Rita Repulsa was portrayed by multiple actresses. Since the character was created from footage of the Witch Bandora from the original Japanese series Zyuranger, she was portrayed by Machiko Soga and dubbed in English by Barbara Goodson. Goodson continued to voice the role until Power Rangers in Space in 1998. Carla Perez took over the visual portrayal from Soga when the character was reintroduced midway through Mighty Morphin's second season in 1994, portraying her from 1994 until Power Rangers in Space in 1998, and Julia Cortez portrayed the character in the 1995 film Mighty Morphin Power Rangers: The Movie. In 2006, the character was reintroduced as Mystic Mother in Power Rangers Mystic Force, again portrayed by Soga, this time with Susan Brady providing her voice. Elizabeth Banks portrayed a reimagined Rita in the 2017 reboot film. Goodson returned to voice Rita in 2021 for her playable appearance in Power Rangers: Battle for the Grid.

== Synopsis ==
=== Mighty Morphin Power Rangers ===
In Mighty Morphin Power Rangers, Rita was born to Master Vile and Lady Fienna and had a younger brother named Rito Revolto. At one point, her parents got her a fire breathing dragon when she wanted a "cute little planet" instead. Rita then used the dragon to burn down their house. At some point, Rita began working for Lord Zedd in his attempts at conquering the universe. She served as his regent while he was elsewhere. However, Zordon and his army opposed her. Rita managed to steal and corrupt the Dragon Coin. However, Zordon eventually managed to seal Rita and her minions in a space dumpster, though Rita manages to trap Zordon in a time warp.

==== Season 1 ====
At the beginning of season 1, Rita Repulsa had been imprisoned for over ten thousand years in the space dumpster. She, along with the other season 1 villains, were unknowingly released by a pair of Earth astronauts. She exited the dumpster along with her minions Goldar, Baboo & Squatt, and Finster. Rita claimed she would conquer the first planet she saw after being freed, which unsurprisingly happened to be Earth. Over the course of the show, Rita Repulsa battled the Power Rangers using everything from phobia spells, super Putty Patrollers, binding magic spells, and on occasion, she would even allow the likes of Goldar, Squatt, and Baboo to be "in charge" of destroying the Power Rangers. All of their plans failed, and Rita would normally take her frustrations out on her henchmen by bashing them on the head with her magic wand or yelling in their faces. One of Rita's most memorable traits was that following each loss, she would either swear vengeance or complain that she had a headache (the latter becoming one of her trademarks).

==== Season 2 ====
Carla Perez played Rita in season 2 and continued to play her for the rest of the original series.

In season 2, Rita's reign of terror came to an end when Lord Zedd returned to assume control. Then it is revealed Rita was not the true empress, but actually the regent of Zedd's empire while he was off in other places. Zedd was furious that Rita had failed to defeat "children" and conquer the Earth, even when Rita warned him about Zordon. Despite Rita's begging and pleading, Lord Zedd vaporized Rita's magic wand and shrank her down to the size of a toy before again exiling her into space in a space dumpster. Locked within a space dumpster, Rita came within inches of freedom when her dumpster came to Earth, and Bulk and Skull succeeded in opening the dumpster. But the Power Rangers were successful in sending Rita back into space. Eventually, her dumpster crashed into the Moon, and she escaped. Down but not out, after regaining her freedom, Rita sought assistance from Finster, her still loyal henchman, to concoct a love potion that would generate libidic feelings for use on Lord Zedd. She also used a beauty cream made by Finster over her face to become younger (serving to transition the actress from Soga to Perez). The love potion worked and the two were then married. Once married to Lord Zedd, Rita eventually gave up her magic practices and worked alongside Lord Zedd as a partner in crime. With Zedd by Rita's side, they are more powerful together and attempted to defeat the Rangers. Though they each failed, the Rangers did not claim victory so easily as the result of how efficacious their enemies have become.

==== Season 3 ====
In season 3, Shortly after the wedding, Rita's brother, Rito Revolto, arrived to join his sister and brother-in-law on their quest to destroy the Power Rangers. Following this, crossing their staffs, Rita and Zedd were able to make monsters grow by the power of lightning. Nevertheless, they continued to fail, even with help from Rita's spy, Katherine Hillard, who, after breaking free from Rita's control, joined the forces of the Power Rangers as the second Pink Ranger when Kimberly Hart departed for Florida. Additionally, Goldar found out about the love potion that Rita used on Lord Zedd and had a concoction created to reverse the effects. The anti-love potion brought Zedd back to normal. However, he had apparently developed a real love for Rita of his own accord.

Later still, her father, Master Vile, made his entrance and enraged over Rita's marriage to Lord Zedd, yells at her. He later aids the villains greatly by leaving the Rangers as powerless children. However, the Alien Rangers arrive to assist Zordon and foiling his plans. Rita is embarrassed to see Master Vile throwing a tantrum like child and tells him to stop doing that. Master Vile decides to leave much to her embarrassment and Zedd's pleasure.

=== Mighty Morphin Alien Rangers ===
In Mighty Morphin Alien Rangers, Rita's father turned back time using the Orb of Doom. As a result the Alien Rangers were summoned from Aquitar, working to protect Earth from Rita and Zedd's forces until the de-aged Rangers could acquire the Zeo Crystal and use it to turn time back to normal. During this story arc, the villains were successful in destroying the power coins and planting an explosive device within the catacombs of the Command Center and once the Zeo sub crystals were all reassembled set off the device believing that they had finally destroyed Zordon, Alpha and the Power Rangers. They however lost contact with Rito and Goldar who they believed escaped the destruction of the Command Center with the Zeo Crystal.

=== Power Rangers Zeo ===
In Power Rangers Zeo, despite their apparent victory, Rita and Zedd were forced to flee to live in refuge with Master Vile following the arrival of the Machine Empire. However, the couple, along with the other villains, returned to the moon in a motorhome and throughout the latter part of Zeo. Rita and Zedd attempted to thwart the Machine Empire's plots and even aided the Rangers to prevent the Machine Empire from claiming Earth. In "Rangers of Two Worlds, Part 1", Finster made a new staff for Rita, which is much stronger than before. She had planned to make Katherine into a monster, but due to Goldar and Rito squabbling over seating arrangements, their fighting unwittingly veered the motorhome off target and created Impursonator from her ugly purse. Despite its harmless form, she ended up being one of Rita's most powerful monsters created and even deflecting hits from the Zeo Ultrazord. After King Mondo and his family are defeated by the Power Rangers, Zedd and Rita gave Prince Sprocket a present, claimed as a peace offering, which was actually a bomb, which blows the Royal House of Gadgetry to pieces. Zedd and Rita are seen driving away victoriously in their motorhome, while King Mondo swears revenge on the two.

=== Turbo: A Power Rangers Movie ===
Rita and Zedd made a small cameo appearance in Turbo: A Power Rangers Movie. Divatox calls them in the middle of the night to ask them how to destroy the Rangers. In a comical scene, Rita held the phone to a snoring Zedd, saying that if she knew how to stop the Rangers she would not be listening to that, and then told Divatox her advice was to run.

=== Power Rangers Turbo ===
In the Power Rangers Turbo episode "The Millennium Message", the Blue Senturion plays a video message from the future foretelling of Dark Specter's alliance and their attack on the galaxy. Shown working together and causing destruction are Rita, Zedd, Mondo, Machina and Divatox.

=== Power Rangers in Space ===
In Power Rangers in Space, Rita and Zedd joined the alliance of villains led by Dark Specter, and assisted with Dark Specter's scheme to vanquish all good in the universe. In the first episode, Rita competes with Divatox for the task of pursuing Andros, the Red Space Ranger who has infiltrated the meeting of villains. During Dark Specter's final assault, Zedd and Rita were assigned to conquer a Planet in the Vica Galaxy that was defended by Trey of Triforia, the Gold Zeo Ranger. During the final confrontation in "Countdown to Destruction, Part 2" when Zordon sacrificed his own life, it caused an energy wave that destroyed the invaders and purified the villains into humans. Rita was transformed into a normal human, who swiftly expressed delight that Lord Zedd had also been transformed. They were seen dancing happily, while the bemused Trey watches on with relief.

=== Power Rangers Mystic Force ===
Machiko Soga as Rita the Mystic Mother in Power Rangers Mystic Force/Magiel in Mahou Sentai Magiranger

In Power Rangers Mystic Force, viewers learn that Rita has become the Mystic Mother, Empress of Good Magic and leader of the Mystic Ones. She is the one who apparently gave the Power Rangers Mystic Force their link to the Morphing Grid. When she learns that the Master is about to assault the Mystic Mother's fortress, Udonna mentions that she was "known as Rita in the dark days". It is the Mystic Mother who gives Clare the powers of a full sorceress and helps the Mystic Rangers to defeat the Master of Darkness—in typical Rita fashion, she accuses the Master of giving her a headache.

Note that the characters were unrelated in the original Japanese Super Sentai series, even though they were both played by Machiko Soga (she was one of many actors in the original franchise who played unrelated characters in different seasons). The writers decided to connect the characters both as an Easter egg for long-time fans and as a tribute to Soga herself, who died while Mystic Force was in production.

=== Power Rangers Operation Overdrive ===
In the Power Rangers Operation Overdrive 15th special anniversary episode, Once A Ranger, Zedd and Rita's previously unknown son, Thrax, confront the Overdrive Rangers. Thrax united the current team's various enemies and severed their connection to the Morphing Grid. In response, the Sentinel Knight assembles a team of veteran Rangers to defeat Thrax. Adam, the new team's leader, mentions his previous battles with Zedd and Rita and observes that Thrax will be difficult to defeat. When he later mentions Rita's change of allegiance, Thrax mocks his mother's decision to embrace good after Zordon's wave purified her.

=== Power Rangers Beast Morphers ===
Rita is mentioned and made a cameo in the footage in the Power Rangers Beast Morphers episode "Making Bad." She is shown in the footage of Lord Zedd when Scrozzle suggested that they use the Re-Animizer on Lord Zedd's staff.

=== Mighty Morphin Power Rangers: Once & Always ===
In the anniversary film Mighty Morphin Power Rangers: Once & Always, Billy Cranston, in an attempt to revive Zordon, accidentally collects the evil that was blasted off of Rita by the Z-Wave. This evil possesses the body of Alpha 8, becoming a new version of the villainess called Robo-Rita. The revived witch unleashes an army of Putties and creates robot versions of Mighty Minotaur and Snizzard to serve her. She murders Trini Kwan in battle when Trini intercepts a blast meant for Billy, causing Trini's daughter Minh to swear vengeance. Later, she captures Tommy Oliver, Kimberly Hart, Jason Lee Scott, and Rangers from other teams and imprisons them in a machine that drains their energy. Her plan is eventually revealed that she will use the energy to power a time portal so she can help her past self kill the Power Rangers before Zordon can recruit them. Minh intercepts a blast meant for Billy, but survives and successfully morphs. The remaining Rangers defeat her minions and Minh and Zack Taylor destroy Robo-Rita, putting an end to the evil of Rita Repulsa.

=== Power Rangers Cosmic Fury ===
In the finale of Power Rangers Cosmic Fury, an evil copy of Lord Zedd is defeated by being placed in an eternal dream of being endlessly nagged by Rita.

== In other media ==
=== Mighty Morphin Power Rangers: The Movie ===
Julia Cortez as Rita in Mighty Morphin Power Rangers: The Movie

In Mighty Morphin Power Rangers: The Movie, Rita, Zedd, Goldar, and Mordant arrive on earth at the constructive site and crack open a giant egg releasing Ivan Ooze after 6,000 years, a morphological being who ruled earth with an iron fist before he was overthrown by Zordon and a group of young warriors. Ivan usurps Rita and Zedd, trapping them in a snow globe. In a mid-credits scene, Goldar briefly lounges in Zedd's throne being served by Mordant only to panic when Zedd and Rita appear having been released after Ivan was destroyed.

=== Power Rangers (2017 film) ===
Elizabeth Banks as Rita Repulsa in the 2017 film Power Rangers

Rita Repulsa appears in Power Rangers, portrayed by Elizabeth Banks. Rita is the former Green Ranger, with her character now seeking to harness the Ranger's power source. An apparent former member of Zordon's Ranger team, Rita betrayed them to acquire the power of the Zeo Crystal, the source of all life on Earth, killing the rest of the team until Zordon buried the Power Coins and had Alpha hide his location with a meteor that blasted Rita into the ocean and seriously damaged her armor. She is brought up in the present day by a fishing boat captained by Sam Scott, Jason's father, and soon sets about gathering gold to replenish her power with the goal of unleashing Goldar, a massive monster who will allow her to acquire the Crystal. After the Rangers are forced to confront her directly despite not having mastered their powers, she kills Billy after she forces him to reveal the location of the Crystal, which is underneath the Krispy Kreme doughnut shop, but Zordon and the other Rangers are able to revive him, at the cost of sacrificing Zordon's chance to come back to life himself. The Rangers subsequently face Goldar in battle with the Zords, but only gain the upper hand when they form the Megazord. Despite Rita merging with Goldar to take charge of the fight, the Rangers are finally able to defeat her and destroy Goldar. They offer her the chance to surrender and hand over the green Power Coin, but she instead tries to attack them again, only to be 'slapped' into the sky by Jason. She is last shown drifting in space towards the Moon, smiling in satisfaction as her body freezes.

==== Power/Rangers (2015 short film) ====
In Power/Rangers Rita Repulsa (played by Katee Sackhoff and Carla Perez), in this much darker fan short film, in this timeline the Machine Empire defeats the Power Rangers and destroys the Megazord in battle, Earth's governments negotiate a truce with the Machine Empire and the Power Rangers are disbanded. Rita (disguised as Kimberly Hart) pretends to be captured by Rocky DeSantos, the second Red Ranger, who has defected to the Machine Empire. Rita is murdering the other former Power Rangers as part of her plan to find Tommy Oliver and convince him to rejoin her so they can rule the world together.

== Reception ==
O Globo and other media noted that the character remained closely associated with Carla Perez's portrayal. The shift in the approach of the character in 2024 was noted: "Rita Repulsa is famously the first villain the Power Rangers ever had to face, and she’s maintained her standing as a pillar of evil and villainy throughout Power Rangers lore. However, in Power Rangers Prime, the real villains are the Eldarians, and they were famously heroic in Power Rangers canon". Another commentator thought that the change made her "unrecognizable".
