= Kimberly Hart =

Fictional character in Power Rangers

- Power Rangers character
- Amy Jo Johnson as Kimberly
- First appearance: Day of the Dumpster (Mighty Morphin Power Rangers)
- Portrayed by: Amy Jo Johnson; Maxxe Sternbaum (child); Naomi Scott (2017 film adaptation)
- Voiced by: Kim Mai Guest (Super Legends); Meghan Camarena (Battle for the Grid); Cristina Vee (Rita's Rewind)

In-universe information
- Full name: Kimberly Ann Hart
- Title(s): Pink Power Ranger; Pink Ninja Ranger
- Home: Earth
- Color(s): Pink
- Status: Active
- Zords: Pterodactyl Dinozord; Firebird Thunderzord; Crane Ninjazord

Kimberly Ann Hart is a fictional character in the Power Rangers universe. Played by American actress Amy Jo Johnson during the first three seasons of the show, plus on the two feature films of the franchise, Kimberly has the longest tenure of any female ranger in the series' history, and fourth overall. She is best remembered as the original Pink Ranger (pterodactyl) and original Pink Ninja Ranger from the first entry of the franchise Mighty Morphin Power Rangers. Kimberly was the Pink Ranger for nearly three years before she was written off the show as having given up her powers for good to Zordon's new pink ranger Katherine Hillard, to participate at the Pan Global Games in Florida. However, she would briefly return as the Pink Ranger on three occasions. She first returned during the Legendary Battle of Power Rangers Super Megaforce alongside former teammates Zack Taylor, Billy Cranston, Trini Kwan, and Jason Lee Scott. The five of them later fought alongside the Dino Thunder Rangers, Dino Charge Rangers, and the Grid Battleforce Rangers against Goldar Maximus in Power Rangers Beast Morphers. She also returned to fight a robotic version of Rita Repulsa with the other four original rangers and Tommy Oliver in Mighty Morphin Power Rangers: Once & Always. Johnson did not reprise her role for any of these appearances. A reimagined version of Kimberly would appear in the 2017 reboot film, played by British actress Naomi Scott.

== Character history ==
=== Mighty Morphin Power Rangers ===
Kimberly is one of the original five Power Rangers chosen by Zordon when Rita Repulsa attacked Earth following her release from containment. She, along with her close friends Jason Lee Scott, Zack Taylor, Billy Cranston and Trini Kwan, was one of the five teens chosen by Zordon to receive a great power, drawn from the spirits of the prehistoric animals. Kimberly receives the Pterodactyl Power Coin and the Pterodactyl Dinozord, thus becoming the Pink Power Ranger. Kimberly starts the series as a stereotypical valley girl, but with a heightened awareness for her friends. Throughout the series, she is the member of the team most likely to fire off a sarcastic or witty retort. However, as the series progresses, she becomes a deeper and kind-hearted person, due to experiences such as switching bodies with the nerdy Billy Cranston and being turned into a punk after Baboo administers a potion to one of Kimberly's drinks. She also displays a cunning, clever and intuitive side, also inherited from her time in switching bodies with Billy.

Kimberly is a capable gymnast and was often shown training and using her abilities in fights against Rita's forces, as she fought with a blend of gymnastic maneuvers, elbows and kicks. She often uses the environment around her as a springboard for her attacks and is often needed to defeat monsters with visible weaknesses, such as the archery-based Snizzard and the Terror Toad. She also teaches dance classes at Angel Grove's Youth Center while using American Sign Language to interpret for a student with a disability. Kimberly is revealed to be proficient in many hobbies throughout the series, including designing and arranging the floral pattern for a parade float, being regarded as a great cheerleader throughout Junior High School and being able to sing and play guitar.

Kimberly's best friend is Trini Kwan, with whom she starts a petition for environmental awareness and volunteered to become "Big Sisters" to Maria, a young girl who needed guidance. When Kimberly starts a botany club that is less popular than Trini's volleyball club, Lord Zedd uses a spell to turn Kimberly's jealousy into hatred; however, she overcomes the spell and the two girls defeat Zedd's monster, the Bloom of Doom, before reaffirming that they are lifelong friends. Later, Mr. Caplan apologized to both Kimberly and Trini for accidentally switching the forms. When Trini leaves for a Peace Conference in Switzerland, Kimberly becomes close with Trini's replacement, Aisha Campbell, with whom she shops with every day.

When Tommy Oliver transfers to Angel Grove, Kimberly becomes attracted to the young man on the spot and becomes visibly upset when Tommy's demeanor toward her becomes hostile. After Tommy breaks Rita Repulsa's spell, a relationship develops between the two after a series of tender moments, including the couple's first kiss when Kimberly supports Tommy after losing his Green Ranger powers and accepts his invitation to a dance. Skull, one of the local bullies, had a crush on Kimberly, but she rejected him until beginning her relationship with Tommy. Years later, Skull was shown to still harbor feelings toward Kimberly, who was put under a love spell and became attracted to him. After the spell was broken, Kimberly apologized for her behavior, noting the two were friends and offering to dance with him.

In show's second season, Kimberly controlled the Firebird Thunderzord. After Tommy lost his Green Ranger powers once again, this time permanently, and left Angel Grove, Kimberly frequently wished Tommy was still around. She was also kidnapped by Lord Zedd's forces to serve as his new Queen as Zedd was attracted to her beauty and tenacity. However, Kimberly shows a clever and intuitive side to her and was able to stall Goldar with convincing Rita imitations. Irritated with reminders of Rita abusing him, Goldar was forced to retreat and her friends saved her. When Tommy returned as the White Ranger, Kimberly fainted upon seeing him and the two resumed their relationship, going on dates together.

Tommy and Kimberly's relationship, as well as Kimberly and Aisha's friendship, were tested many times by Lord Zedd, but the relationships always maintained intact. When Tommy and Kimberly ran against each other to become class president, they bickered until Tommy conceded the race. Kimberly was often isolated from the rest of the team and put into danger, but she overcame adversity each time, including landing her uncle's airplane, escaping from Samurai Fan Man, Lord Zedd's failed attempt to make her his newest consort, and recruiting the ancestors of her present-day friends to become the Wild West Rangers when she falls into a time hole that brings her to 1880s Angel Grove.

In the show's third season, Kimberly remains on Earth with the flu while her friends travel to the planet Edenoi to help Dex, the Masked Rider; as a result, Kimberly battles a monster, Repellator, despite her illness. When Rito Revolto destroys the Thunderzords, Kimberly and the other Rangers travel to the Desert of Despair and gain new powers from the creator of the Power Coins, Ninjor. Kimberly becomes the Pink Ninja Ranger, harnessing the spirit of the crane and controlling the Pink Crane Ninjazord. Kimberly later moves in with Aisha's family when her mother becomes engaged to a painter and moves to France; Zedd creates a monster, Artistmole, from Kimberly's nightmares about her mother's fiancé, but Kimberly defeats it. Kimberly was sad when her mother was not present for the 1995 holiday season, but she returned from France to surprise her daughter.

Midway through season three, Amy Jo Johnson requested that Kimberly be written off the show because she wanted to pursue other opportunities in acting. The character was accommodated with a 10-episode story arc focused on Kimberly, leading up to her departure. Kimberly and Aisha adopt a stray white cat, "P.C.," who is the secret form of Rita's new spy Katherine Hillard. Katherine also spies the Rangers in her human form; she ultimately develops feelings for Tommy and jealous of Kimberly's relationship with him, steals Kimberly's Power Coin; with the Coin in evil hands, Kimberly's very life force is in danger. Lord Zedd kidnaps Kimberly and uses her as ransom for the other Rangers, but they rescue her. Zordon disconnects Kimberly's connection to the Morphing Grid, forcing her to receive power from the other Rangers, much like Tommy had when he was losing his Green Ranger powers; Tommy consoled Kimberly through this time, as she had done previously for him.

Meanwhile, Kimberly caught the interest of a gymnastics coach, Gunthar Schmidt, and began training for the preliminaries of the Pan Global Games. As she trained, Rita and Zedd plotted to exploit this and tire Kimberly in battles; they succeed when she falls off a balance beam while training and injures herself. However, this event breaks Rita's spell over Katherine, who calls an ambulance and convinces Kimberly not to give up on gymnastics. Katherine also returns Kimberly's Power Coin back to her. When Zordon allows Kimberly to give up her Ranger duties to participate in the Pan Global Games, which occurred in Florida, Kimberly chose Katherine to replace her as the Pink Ranger, ending her appearances on the show. She is later referenced in "Power Rangers Zeo" when she sends a breakup letter to Tommy, explaining she had found someone else.

=== Turbo: A Power Rangers Movie ===
Amy Jo Johnson makes a final appearance as Kimberly in the franchise in Turbo: A Power Rangers Movie, when she and Jason Lee Scott, return to Angel Grove to surprise the Rangers but are captured by the evil pirate queen Divatox, who plans to sacrifice the two to her fiancé, Maligore. Toward the end of the film, Jason and Kimberly are lowered into the volcano and possessed by the evil being Maligore. The Power Rangers must fight Jason and Kimberly until the wizard Lerigot cures them both of the evil influence. Shortly after Maligore's defeat, Kimberly was last seen cheering on Jason, Tommy, and Adam in their martial arts tournament. The film hints at her being a romantic interest or in a relationship with Jason. She also switches from surfing clothes to leather outfits, selling the silver chains and black clamps plus the fire and ropes to a local adventure store in New Zealand. 2000 Now wears gloves on her wrists when she rides a bike and a helmet(white color) with pink elbow pads so she doesn't slip over(when rollerblading through a big city like Sydney NSW 2000).

=== Mighty Morphin Power Rangers: Once & Always ===
Kimberly was part of the reunited Mighty Morphin team who fought Robo-Rita in the battle that ended with Trini's death. One year later, while gathering at the graveyard where Trini is buried, she, Jason, Tommy, Zack, and Billy are attacked again by Robo-Rita and two monsters the team had fought in the past, the Mighty Minotaur (from the episode "Teamwork") and Snizard (from "Foul Play in the Sky"). She, Jason, and Tommy wind up captured by the latter and used by Robo-Rita to power a time machine so she can travel to the past and facilitate her conquest by killing the would-be Power Rangers before Zordon has a chance to choose them. They, as well as a handful of other captured Rangers, are released when the villains and the machine are destroyed. Because Johnson had declined to reprise her role, Kimberly does not appear unmorphed, but she is shown in archive footage at the end of the special playing a song of her composition (from the season 2 episode "The Song of Guitardo").

=== Mighty Morphin Power Rangers tie-ins ===
Kimberly appears in the Mighty Morphin Power Rangers and Go Go Power Rangers comics published by Boom! Studios, set during her early years as a ranger.

An alternate version of Kimberly also appears in the comic, first introduced as part of the "Shattered Grid" crossover event. This version of Kimberly hails from an alternate universe in which Tommy chose to stay with Rita, becoming the evil Lord Drakkon and conquering Earth. Kimberly and the other rangers formed a resistance group, but she was captured by Drakkon and brainwashed into becoming his henchman, now dubbed the Ranger Slayer. After Drakkon was captured while attacking the main universe, she and her Gravezord are sent to retrieve him but inadvertently emerges too far in the past. She attempts to attack the command center, but is found by her past self, who attacks her and breaks Drakkon's mind control. To make up for her actions under Drakkon, Ranger Slayer saves this dimension's Tommy, preventing his death in the future, and is recruited to the Promethea base to help stop Drakkon's final plan. Following the reconstruction of the multiverse, Ranger Slayer and the Promethea are left drifting in a seemingly empty void, where she leads a new team of rangers in searching for a way home.

==== Mighty Morphin Power Rangers: Pink ====
Kimberly stars in a comic book miniseries published by Boom! Studios. The series is a modern remake but also serves as a continuation from Kimberly's exit in the third season of Mighty Morphin Power Rangers. After handing her powers over to Kat, Zordon uses the Sword of Light to activate the latent pink energy within Kimberly to make her a ranger once again. As the main team of Power Rangers are off world in this series, Kimberly asks Zack and Trini to join her on a mission as the black and yellow rangers respectively. She later recruits two French siblings as the blue male ranger and red female ranger. In forming this new team of rangers, Kimberly effectively becomes the leader. The events that take place in this series lead to Kimberly writing her letter which Tommy eventually receives in the Power Rangers Zeo episode, There's No Business Like Snow Business. The comics ending shows that Kimberly had been changed from the experience, deciding that she preferred living life outside of being a full time Ranger, and that she initially lies to him about finding someone else so he doesn't have to face how distant they became. It's also suggested that Jason may indeed be the "other guy" in the letter as she sees a text from him confirming a lunch date as she is vocalizing her thoughts in regards to ending things with Tommy.

=== Other versions ===
==== 1995 film ====
In Mighty Morphin Power Rangers: The Movie, Amy Jo Johnson portrayed a similar version of her character from the television series, who receives new powers from warrior Dulcea and becomes the Pink Ninja Ranger; she harnesses the spirit of the crane and controls the Pink Crane Ninjazord to defeat Ivan Ooze with her team. Unlike the television series, Kimberly's Pink Ranger costume is more of an armor than a formfitting spandex garment.

==== Power/Rangers (2015 short film) ====
In Power/Rangers Kimberly Hart (played by Katee Sackhoff), in this much darker fan short film, in this timeline the Machine Empire defeats the Power Rangers and destroys the Megazord in battle, Earth's governments negotiate a truce with the Machine Empire and the Power Rangers are disbanded. Kimberly married Jason Lee Scott, but their marriage lasted eight hours after Farkas Bulkmeier and Eugene Skullovitch betrayed them to the police. Jason was killed in the crossfire and Kimberly captured, whilst being interrogated by Rocky DeSantos, who has defected to the Machine Empire, he reveals it's all part of his plan to capture Tommy Oliver. When Tommy appears, he and Rocky fight. Kimberly escapes her bonds and kills Rocky, however Tommy knows the real Kimberly died in his arms during the final battle, and it's revealed she is Rita Repulsa in disguise the whole time, after killing Tommy's teammates as part of her plan for him to re-join her so they can rule the world together.

==== 2017 film ====
Naomi Scott as Kimberly in 2017 film Power Rangers

Kimberly appears in the 2017 film adaptation, played by English actress Naomi Scott. A former 'mean girl' cheerleader at the school, Kimberly was removed from the cheerleading team and punished with detention for the remainder of the year after leaking a photograph of an ex-teammate, and former friend, in a compromising position. The largely negative reaction to the photograph forces Kimberly to realize how cruel her actions were for the first time. After falling out with her old friends, she cuts her hair short to represent the desire for change and new beginnings. Later that night she hikes up the mountains near the mining quarry and goes swimming to clear her head. She runs into Jason, who gave Billy a ride up to the quarry earlier that evening, and is subsequently present when Billy blows up the cliffside revealing the Power Coins. When the team is unable to morph, Kimberly confides in Jason that she believes she is the cause, as she cannot bring herself to tell her personal story to the team. He consoles her and tells her to be the person she wants to be and to not let past mistakes define her. Kimberly eventually joins the Rangers in the battle against Goldar and Rita.

In the teaser trailer, Kimberly is shown to be romantically involved with Jason when they kiss in his room, though this scene did not appear in the film. However, there still does seem to be a romantic interest in him and undertone between the two in the released film. In another deleted scene, she is shown to have a white father and an Indian mother (just as Naomi Scott has in real life), who do not approve of her new haircut.

Amy Jo Johnson makes a cameo appearance alongside Jason David Frank at the conclusion of the film as part of a crowd of civilians watching the battle between the newly formed Megazord and Rita's monster, Goldar.

== Reception ==
Kimberly has been criticized for being too stereotypically female by academia. Hart is considered the most popular female Power Ranger.
