= Jason Lee Scott =

Fictional character

- Power Rangers character
- Austin St. John as Jason Lee Scott
- First appearance: Day of the Dumpster (Mighty Morphin Power Rangers)
- Portrayed by: Austin St. John; Dacre Montgomery (2017 reboot)
- Voiced by: Paul F. Rosenthal; Yuri Lowenthal (Power Rangers: Super Legends); A.J. LoCascio (Rita's Rewind)

In-universe information
- Title: Red Power Ranger; Gold Zeo Ranger
- Home: Earth
- Color(s): Red (Mighty Morphin); Gold (Zeo)
- Zords: Tyrannosaurus Dinozord; Dragonzord; Red Dragon Thunderzord; Pyramidas; Warrior Wheel

Jason Lee Scott is a fictional character in the Power Rangers franchise, played by actor Austin St. John. Jason is known as the first on screen Red Ranger from the first on screen series, Mighty Morphin Power Rangers, as well as the leader of the first on screen team of Power Rangers. He later becomes the temporary Gold Ranger in Power Rangers Zeo. He once again becomes the Red Ranger by Power Rangers: Beast Morphers, alongside his original team. A reimagined version of Jason appears in the 2017 reboot film, played by Australian actor Dacre Montgomery.

== Fictional character history ==
=== Mighty Morphin Power Rangers ===
Jason is a martial artist from the fictional town of Angel Grove, California. At the beginning of Mighty Morphin Power Rangers, he and his closest friends Zack Taylor, Billy Cranston, Trini Kwan and Kimberly Hart are selected by Zordon and Alpha 5 as the five "teenagers with attitude" to become the original Power Rangers and defend Earth from the forces of the evil Rita Repulsa. When Zordon first confronts the teens to give them their powers, Jason is the only one who initially believes him. Jason becomes the Red Power Ranger and is given the Dinozord Power Coin of the Tyrannosaurus, obtains the Tyrannosaurus Dinozord (a colossal assault vehicle) and is made the team leader. He leads the Rangers into many battles against Rita's monsters, establishing a rivalry with Rita's number one henchman Goldar.

When Tommy Oliver comes in, he becomes competitive rivals with Jason, matching him in a martial arts competition. Rita then manipulates Tommy, turning him into the evil Green Ranger and sends him into battle. He later captures Jason, steals his Power Morpher and imprisons him in Rita's Dark Dimension where he would have to fight Goldar to retrieve his Morpher. The Green Ranger eventually arrives at the scene with orders to destroy Jason, but Billy, Trini and Alpha manage to repair the damage Tommy did to the Command Center, in time to find Jason and retrieve him seconds before Tommy kills him. Later, Jason squares off with Tommy on Earth and ends up finally disarming him and then uses his Blade Blaster to destroy the Sword of Darkness that Rita had given to Tommy, due to the sword's ability to maintain her evil spell on him. The team then convinces Tommy to join the team and use his powers against Rita.

Later, Rita crafts a Green Candle out of special wax that had been enchanted with Tommy's touch when he was evil. Once lit, the candle continues to burn until it is gone and when it is, so too would Tommy's powers. Because Tommy's proximity to the candle accelerates the candle's melting process, Tommy is captured and placed close to it by Goldar. However, he eventually escapes and Jason is left to retrieve the candle.

Following the failure of destroying the Green Candle, Tommy entrusts Jason with his Power Coin to prevent it from falling into Rita's hands again, allowing him access to the Green Ranger's powers (including the Dragon Shield and the Dragon Dagger, which also allows him to call the Dragonzord to aid the Rangers, even while Jason controls the Megazord).

Later, Jason plays a gambit against Goldar, who had kidnapped the parents of Angel Grove High's students, then ransoms them for the Ranger's five Power Coins. Jason would later reveal that though he gave up his Tyrannosaurus Power Coin to Goldar, he kept the Dragon Power Coin. With it, Tommy eventually regains his Green Ranger powers, retrieves the other Ranger's Power Coins and helps the team save their captive parents.

When Lord Zedd arrives and overruns Rita, he sends his new brand of Putty Patrollers to Earth. The Putties possess superior strength to Rita's Putties, the team discovers to hit the Z to destroy them. To compete with their new enemy's more powerful monsters, the Dinozords are upgraded into the mythical Thunderzords; Jason's Dinozord becomes the Red Dragon Thunderzord, which can transform into a humanoid form. As with the Tyrannosaurus, the Red Dragon can defeat a monster on its own, separate from the Megazord formation.

Eventually, Tommy loses his Green Ranger powers again, and Jason suffers from immense guilt because of it. Choosing to capitalize on Jason's vulnerability, Zedd creates candles for Zack, Billy, Trini and Kimberly that would remove their links to the Morphing Grid, just as Rita did to Tommy. Jason, with the help of Zordon's confidence in him, manages to save his friends and prevent them from losing their powers. Following the victory, Jason wins a martial arts trophy and dedicates it to Tommy, who soon after returns as the White Ranger and is named the new leader of the team by Zordon. Tommy's comeback relieves Jason's guilt towards him and accepting him as his successor as the team's leader and becoming the new second-in-command. Tommy still heavily relied on Jason due to his experience, as shown where he asks for Jason's help because he is struggling to defeat Nimrod the Scarlett Sentinel, Jason then comes to Tommy's aid and together with the other Rangers they beat the Nimrod.

Some time later, Jason, Trini and Zack are chosen to act as ambassadors at a Peace Conference in Switzerland (after the actors playing the characters left the show over contract disputes, the characters simply being shown in their Ranger uniforms, using old footage, or with doubles who were never directly facing the cameras, until the transfer could be incorporated into the plot of the show), and are forced to leave the team. Zordon chooses Rocky DeSantos to replace Jason as the Red Ranger.

=== Power Rangers Zeo ===
Jason as the temporary Gold Zeo Ranger

Jason returns in Power Rangers Zeo, taking over the powers of the Gold Zeo Ranger temporarily from Trey of Triforia when Trey was injured in a fight with Varox bounty hunters and required someone else to hold his powers until he could heal. Jason is also chosen by Tanya to become the guardian of Auric the Conqueror for a time. He dates a local waitress, Emily (Lesley Pedersen).

Jason returns the Gold Ranger powers to Trey in the final episode of Zeo when he finds out that he cannot handle it much longer, as they are draining away - along with his life force - due to the Gold Ranger powers not being intended for human physiology. However, there are no apparent long-term effects, and Jason appears perfectly healthy after he transfers it back to Trey.

=== Turbo: A Power Rangers Movie ===
Jason and Kimberly both return in Turbo: A Power Rangers Movie. The film throughout suggests they may be romantically linked, having gotten together sometime after Jason's turn as the Gold Ranger. They are first seen scuba diving together, but are then kidnapped by the villainess Divatox and are briefly brainwashed to fight against the Turbo Rangers. It appears that the evil influence enhanced his own emotional aspects, as at one point he taunts Tommy with "Now I'm the one with the muscles and the power!". After being restored to normal by Lerigot, he once again fades into the background, with Jason's appearance in the film being replacing the injured Rocky in a martial arts tournament and ultimately winning the match, alongside Tommy and Adam.

=== Power Rangers Wild Force ===
Jason returns in Power Rangers Wild Force, in the special episode "Forever Red", which celebrated the tenth anniversary of Power Rangers. In this special, he utilizes his original Red Ranger powers and joins nine other Red Rangers (which includes Tommy, but not Rocky, as Jason is the Mighty Morphin Red Ranger of the episode) to defeat the remnants of the Machine Empire, a force of villains that Jason had previously battled as the Gold Zeo Ranger.

=== Power Rangers Super Megaforce ===
Jason and the other Mighty Morphin Power Rangers return as part of the army of Legendary Rangers led by Tommy that helped the Mega Rangers defeat the Armada once and for all, fighting in a huge battle against hundreds of XBorgs and dozens of Bruisers. However, Austin St. John did not return and Jason only appears morphed, as do the other Mighty Morphin rangers besides Tommy.

=== Power Rangers Beast Morphers ===
Jason returns in Season 2 of Power Rangers Beast Morphers, in the special episode "Grid Connection".

When Jason's old foe Goldar is reanimated by Evox as Goldar Maximus and dispatched to the dimension of the Dino Charge Power Rangers to gather energems, Jason is summoned by Devon, the Grid Battleforce Red Ranger, to help him save the Dino Charge Rangers as well as members of Devon's own team. It is revealed that Jason's Tyrannosaurus Power Coin has laid dormant within a meteorite for an undisclosed amount of time. Devon hands the coin back to Jason. The MMPR main team and the Dino Thunder Power Rangers come back to assist him against the army led by Goldar Maximus.

=== Mighty Morphin Power Rangers: Once & Always ===
Jason was part of the reunited Mighty Morphin team who fought Robo-Rita in the battle that ended with Trini's death. He, Tommy, Kimberly, and Billy are attacked again when they gather in the anniversary of Trini's passing, with a revived Snizard imprisoning all but Billy and Zack. Robo-Rita plans on using their powers as a power source for her latest invention, a machine that opens a portal to the past so she can pass on her knowledge to her younger self and more easily take over the Earth. After the villains and the machine are destroyed, Jason as well as a handful of other captured Rangers, are released. Because St. John had his passport suspended for his alleged illegal activities, he did not reprise his role, so Jason does not appear unmorphed except in archive footage.

== Other versions ==
=== Power/Rangers ===
Jason (played by Stevin Knight) appears in this darker fan short film. After the Machine Empire defeats the Power Rangers and destroys the Megazord in battle, Earth's governments negotiate a truce with the Machine Empire, and the Power Rangers are disbanded. Jason marries Kimberly Hart, and their marriage lasted eight hours until Farkas Bulkmeier and Eugene Skullovitch seemingly revealed their location to the police force. Jason is killed in the crossfire.

=== 2017 film ===
Jason appears as a protagonist in the 2017 reboot film, played by Australian actor Dacre Montgomery. A former high school football star, Jason ruins his potential career when he pulls a prank by bringing a bull into the school's changing room, leaving him sentenced to weekend detentions until the end of the year. He also gains a knee injury for his right leg when he flips his truck during an escape attempt on that fateful night. After he protects Billy Cranston from a bully during the detention, Billy helps Jason shut down his house arrest ankle monitor in return for driving Billy out to the old mines where Billy used to go with his father, resulting in them discovering the Power Coins at the same time as Kimberly, Trini and Zack are in the area. When they experience sudden bursts of strength and speed, (along with having Jason's knee heal overnight), the five return to the place where they found the coins and discover Zordon and Alpha 5 in the spaceship buried underground. Although skeptical at the story presented by Zordon, Jason soon accepts his role as leader and works to rally the team, even daring to confront Rita Repulsa when they have yet to master their powers. This attack on Rita results in Billy's death, but the sight of the team coming together prompts Zordon to selflessly sacrifice a chance to return to life and instead resurrect Billy, allowing the new Rangers to battle Rita after Zordon's team failed. He even wields a sword that once belonged to Zordon, and saves his dad's life without revealing his identity. Jason and Kimberly are hinted to romantically interested in each other in this adaptation with a deleted scene of a kiss between them confirming this.

=== Comics ===
Jason appeared in numerous comic books by Marvel Comics and Papercutz.

Jason also appears in the Mighty Morphin Power Rangers comic from Boom Studios. Jason is shown to have romantic interest in Trini Kwan (Yellow Ranger) and briefly Lauren Shiba (second Red Samurai Ranger).

Jason also has a parallel universe doppelgänger, who not only has the Red Ranger powers but also the White Ranger's. This Jason was an archenemy of Lord Drakkon, who is an evil parallel universe doppelgänger of Tommy Oliver. Lord Drakkon ultimately killed his world's Jason and takes his enemy's White Ranger powers and Red Ranger helmet as trophies, and eliminates their world's Power Rangers.

When Lord Drakkon mounted a mass attack on every Ranger team in history, Jason eventually found himself acting as leader of the forces arrayed against Drakkon, using the Dragon Shield and the Dragonzord as he issued commands to the Rangers from the future. In the process, he also formed a relationship with Lauren Shiba, the surviving Red Ranger of the Samurai Rangers, but the conclusion of this storyline erased Drakkon's attack from history, with the result that Jason and Lauren's relationship was also erased.

Later in the series, Jason, Trini and Zack leaving for the "Peace Conference" is revealed to be a cover story for their new role as the Omega Rangers, using ancient powers to act as agents for the Morphing Masters to track down residual damage caused by Drakkon's attack. During this time, Jason and his team have to protect the Earth Rangers from an enemy that seeks to punish Tommy for Drakkon's actions, unable to acknowledge that Tommy has passed the point when he would become Drakkon. After a confrontation with Astronema and Ecliptor, Jason's time as the Red Omega Ranger comes to an end when he is possessed by the spirit of the Gold Omega, which was released by Andros in an attempt to save Zhane from his current comatose state, only to learn too late that the Gold Omega Ranger seeks to basically cause a zombie apocalypse. The only way to defeat the Gold Omega Ranger forces Jason to sever his connection to the Omega powers, leaving him unable to morph into the Red Omega Ranger again, passing his powers on to Trini while he returns to life on Earth.
