= Jackie Marchand =

Jackie Marchand is a television writer and producer, she is best known for her work on the children's action/adventure series Power Rangers.

== Career ==
Jackie Marchand is, as of Power Rangers Jungle Fury, the longest-running veteran on the show since Judd Lynn, whom she shared co-writing duties with until she left at the end of Power Rangers Time Force. Marchand contributed to all of the SDTV seasons of Power Rangers except for Power Rangers Wild Force.

Taking a break from the show after Time Force, Marchand was brought back to work on the franchise in 2003 by Disney when they began filming new episodes of Power Rangers in New Zealand under the Village Roadshow production team. She contributed to Power Rangers: Ninja Storm and Power Rangers: Dino Thunder.

Since then, Marchand has served the current team behind Ranger Productions. She has been promoted several times during the course of the last two seasons, becoming the story editor in Power Rangers Mystic Force, and serving as co-producer of Power Rangers Operation Overdrive, Power Rangers Jungle Fury, Power Rangers RPM. She was credited as a story consultant on the special Mighty Morphin Power Rangers: Once & Always.

Marchand also played an uncredited voice role in 1998's Power Rangers in Space, as the voice of the monster named Mamamite.

Marchand made an appearance at the Power Morphicon, the first Power Rangers fan convention, in June 2007. She was profiled by Yahoo.com News as part of their coverage of the 2007–2008 Writers Guild of America strike.

Since 2015, Marchand has worked as a story analyst for Amazon Studios.

== Television credits ==
- Mighty Morphin Power Rangers (1995–1996)
- Power Rangers Zeo (1996)
- Power Rangers Turbo (1997)
- Power Rangers in Space (1998)
- Power Rangers Lost Galaxy (1999)
- Power Rangers Lightspeed Rescue (2000)
- Power Rangers Time Force (2001)
- Power Rangers Ninja Storm (2003)
- Power Rangers Dino Thunder (2004)
- Power Rangers S.P.D. (2005)
- Power Rangers Mystic Force (2006)
- MP4orce (2006)
- Power Rangers Operation Overdrive (2007)
- Power Rangers Jungle Fury (2008)
- Power Rangers RPM (2009)
- NFL Rush Zone (2013)
