= Jonathan Tzachor =

Israeli-American producer and director

- Born: Israel
- Occupations: Director; producer

Jonathan Tzachor (Hebrew: יונתן צחור) is an Israeli-American producer and director best known for his work on Power Rangers. After a hiatus from the franchise in 2010, he served as its executive producer from 2011 to 2014.

== Tzachor's tenure ==
Tzachor's time spent as producer brought many firsts to the world of Power Rangers in terms of storywriting and character development. Dark themes were used (particularly in Power Rangers in Space and Power Rangers Time Force) instead of the usual comedic tone, and actual casualties of good characters, which had been occurring in Tokusatsu for years, began to be implemented. It would also mark the first time that Power Rangers started fresh every season after Power Rangers in Space. Furthermore, under Tzachor, much of Power Rangers would draw more material from their Super Sentai counterpart this is also supported by every season's plot being similar to its Sentai counterpart and very little of the plot is changed. Fans of the show have criticized Tzachor for what is viewed as an "overdependence" on the source material, and opinion is divided on his contributions to the series.

== Disney era/departure ==
After Disney's acquisition of the franchise, Tzachor's final series, Power Rangers Wild Force, would be a split season, airing-wise as the first half aired on Fox Kids, while the second half aired on ABC Kids. Ironically, Tzachor was succeeded as producer by the person from whom he took the reins in 1997, Douglas Sloan. MMPR Productions was shut down, and production of the show was transferred to Village Roadshow KP Productions in Auckland, New Zealand (now known as Power Rangers Productions).

The Wild Force finale, The End of the Power Rangers, which was Tzachor's final episode with the franchise until Power Rangers Samurai, was directed by him.

== Saban Brands era ==
After Disney sold the Power Rangers Brand back to Saban in the form of Saban Brands, Jonathan Tzachor was hired to produce the eighteenth season of Power Rangers in New Zealand, known as Power Rangers Samurai and Power Rangers Super Samurai. He returned to the directors chair for the Samurai/RPM crossover special "Clash of the Red Rangers: The Movie" and the 2012 Halloween special "Trickster Treat", as well as several episodes of the series that would succeed Samurai, Power Rangers Megaforce and its follow-up Power Rangers Super Megaforce, before being succeeded as executive producer by Judd Lynn in 2015.

== Producer ==
=== Television ===
- Mighty Morphin Power Rangers (1993-1995)
- Power Rangers Zeo (1996)
- Power Rangers Turbo (1997)
- Power Rangers in Space (1998)
- Power Rangers Lost Galaxy (1999)
- Power Rangers Lightspeed Rescue (2000)
- Power Rangers Time Force (2001)
- Power Rangers Wild Force (2002)
- Power Rangers Samurai (2011-2012)
- Power Rangers Megaforce (2013-2014)

=== Film ===
- American Ninja V (1993)
- Turbo: A Power Rangers Movie (1997)
- See Arnold Run (2005)
- Return to House on Haunted Hill (2007)
- Echelon Conspiracy (2009)
- The Hills Run Red (2009)

== Director ==
- Mighty Morphin Power Rangers (1994-1995)
- Power Rangers in Space (1998)
- Power Rangers Lost Galaxy (1999)
- Power Rangers Lightspeed Rescue (2000)
- Power Rangers Time Force (2001)
- Power Rangers Wild Force (2002)
- Power Rangers Samurai (2011-2012)
- Power Rangers Megaforce (2013-2014)
