= List of Power Rangers television series =

Episode list for a live action series

Power Rangers is adapted from the 51-year-long line of Japanese tokusatsu television series known as Super Sentai. The first series, Mighty Morphin Power Rangers, premiered in 1993. The networks listed are those where the new episodes for those seasons first aired. Other networks that reran the broadcasts of new Power Rangers episodes a few weeks or months later for those seasons, such as ABC (most seasons), ABC Family (most seasons) or Nicktoons are not included.

== Series overview ==
Twenty-three television series make up the Power Rangers franchise: Mighty Morphin Power Rangers, Mighty Morphin Alien Rangers, Zeo, Turbo, in Space, Lost Galaxy, Lightspeed Rescue, Time Force, Wild Force, Ninja Storm, Dino Thunder, S.P.D., Mystic Force, Operation Overdrive, Jungle Fury, RPM, Samurai, Megaforce, Dino Charge, Ninja Steel, Beast Morphers, Dino Fury, and Cosmic Fury. All series in total amount to 973 episodes across 30 seasons of television, including two special seasons. (Note: The two special seasons were Mighty Morphin Alien Rangers (1996) and the re-version of Mighty Morphin Power Rangers (2010). Alien Rangers counts towards the franchise's total episodes but does not constitute its own separate season. The re-version of Power Rangers counts towards neither the total episodes nor seasons.)

Series	Season	Episodes	Originally released			Showrunner(s)
Series	Season	Episodes	First released	Last released	Network	Showrunner(s)
Mighty Morphin Power Rangers	1	60	August 28, 1993	May 23, 1994	Fox (Fox Kids)	Ann Austen & Douglas Sloan
Mighty Morphin Power Rangers	2	52	July 21, 1994	May 20, 1995	Fox (Fox Kids)	Ann Austen & Douglas Sloan
Mighty Morphin Power Rangers	3	33	September 2, 1995	November 27, 1995	Fox (Fox Kids)	Ann Austen & Douglas Sloan
Mighty Morphin Alien Rangers	MS	10	February 5, 1996	February 17, 1996	Fox (Fox Kids)	Ann Austen & Douglas Sloan
Zeo	1	50	April 20, 1996	November 27, 1996	Fox (Fox Kids)	Ann Austen & Douglas Sloan
Turbo	1	45	April 19, 1997	November 24, 1997	Fox (Fox Kids)	Ann Austen & Douglas Sloan and Judd Lynn
In Space	1	43	February 6, 1998	November 21, 1998	Fox (Fox Kids)	Judd Lynn
Lost Galaxy	1	45	February 6, 1999	December 18, 1999	Fox (Fox Kids)	Judd Lynn
Lightspeed Rescue	1	40	February 12, 2000	November 18, 2000	Fox (Fox Kids)	Judd Lynn
Time Force	1	40	February 3, 2001	November 17, 2001	Fox (Fox Kids)	Judd Lynn
Wild Force	1	40	February 9, 2002	November 16, 2002	Fox (Fox Kids) / ABC (ABC Kids)	Jonathan Tzachor
Ninja Storm	1	38	February 15, 2003	November 15, 2003	ABC (ABC Kids)	Ann Austen & Douglas Sloan
Dino Thunder	1	38	February 14, 2004	November 20, 2004	ABC Family (Jetix)	Ann Austen & Douglas Sloan
S.P.D.	1	38	February 5, 2005	November 14, 2005 (Note: Episode 35 was aired later, on February 2, 2006)	ABC Family (Jetix) / Toon Disney (Jetix)	Bruce Kalish
Mystic Force	1	32	February 20, 2006	November 13, 2006	ABC Family (Jetix) / Toon Disney (Jetix)	Bruce Kalish
Operation Overdrive	1	32	February 26, 2007	November 12, 2007	Toon Disney (Jetix)	Bruce Kalish
Jungle Fury	1	32	February 18, 2008	November 3, 2008	Toon Disney (Jetix)	Bruce Kalish
RPM	1	32	March 7, 2009	December 26, 2009	ABC (ABC Kids)	Eddie Guzelian and Judd Lynn
Mighty Morphin Power Rangers (re-version)	RV	32	January 2, 2010	August 28, 2010	ABC (ABC Kids)	Haim Saban & Shuki Levy
Samurai / Super Samurai	1	23	February 7, 2011	December 10, 2011	Nickelodeon	Jonathan Tzachor
Samurai / Super Samurai	2	22	February 18, 2012	December 15, 2012	Nickelodeon	Jonathan Tzachor
Megaforce / Super Megaforce	1	22	February 2, 2013	December 7, 2013	Nickelodeon	Jonathan Tzachor
Megaforce / Super Megaforce	2	20	February 15, 2014	November 22, 2014	Nickelodeon	Jonathan Tzachor
Dino Charge / Dino Super Charge	1	22	February 7, 2015	December 12, 2015	Nickelodeon	Judd Lynn
Dino Charge / Dino Super Charge	2	22	January 30, 2016	December 10, 2016	Nickelodeon	Judd Lynn
Ninja Steel / Super Ninja Steel	1	22	January 21, 2017	December 2, 2017	Nickelodeon	Judd Lynn
Ninja Steel / Super Ninja Steel	2	22	January 27, 2018	December 1, 2018	Nickelodeon	Judd Lynn
Beast Morphers	1	22	March 2, 2019	December 14, 2019	Nickelodeon	Judd Lynn
Beast Morphers	2	22	February 22, 2020	December 12, 2020	Nickelodeon	Judd Lynn
Dino Fury	1	22	February 20, 2021	October 15, 2021 (Note: Complete season ended on December 18, 2021 on Nickelodeon.)	Nickelodeon / Netflix	Simon Bennett
Dino Fury	2	22	March 3, 2022	September 29, 2022	Netflix	Simon Bennett
Cosmic Fury	1	10	September 29, 2023		Netflix	Simon Bennett

== Power Rangers specials ==
This section indexes the official specials that are not considered part of the normal episode count.

=== Television specials ===
Title	Original release date
Mighty Morphin Power Rangers: The Movie: Secrets Revealed	June 18, 1995
Power Playback: Funniest Power Rangers Moments	June 13, 1998
The Lost Episode	May 22, 1999
The Hidden Episode	January 30, 2005
Power Rangers Operation Overdrive: Behind the Scenes	February 16, 2007
Power Rangers Super Megaforce: The Legendary Battle: Extended Edition	November 24, 2014
Mighty Morphin Power Rangers: Once & Always	April 19, 2023

=== Direct to video ===
Title	Original release date
Alpha's Magical Christmas	October 19, 1994
The Official Mighty Morphin Power Rangers Karate Club: Level 1	November 23, 1994
Mighty Morphin Power Rangers: The Official Fan Club Video	1994
Lord Zedd's Monster Heads: The Greatest Villains of the Mighty Morphin Power Rangers	August 29, 1995
Mighty Morphin Power Rangers Karate Club: The White Ranger Kata	January 31, 1996
The Good, the Bad, and the Stupid: The Misadventures of Bulk and Skull	February 21, 1996
Mighty Morphin Power Rangers World Tour Live on Stage	March 20, 1996
Shift into Turbo: Behind the Scenes of Turbo: A Power Rangers Movie	1998
Mission Training	2005
