= Power Rangers Jungle Fury =

16th season of Power Rangers

- Genre: Action-adventure; Fantasy; Martial arts; Superhero
- Based on: Juken Sentai Gekiranger by Toei Company
- Developed by: Jetix; The Walt Disney Company; Toei Company
- Showrunner: Bruce Kalish
- Starring: See "Cast"
- Theme music composer: Gabriel Moses; Leigh Roberts; Jon Ehrlich
- Composers: Leigh Roberts; Ry Welch; Gad Emile Zeitune; Wayne Jones
- Countries of origin: United States; Japan
- Original language: English
- No. of episodes: 32

Production
- Executive producers: Bruce Kalish; Koichi Sakamoto
- Producers: Sally Campbell; Charles Knight
- Production locations: New Zealand (Auckland Region) (Auckland); Japan (Greater Tokyo Area) (Tokyo, Saitama, Yokohama) and Kyoto); China (Mainland (Tianjin), Macau, Hong Kong)
- Cinematography: Simon Riera
- Camera setup: Single-camera
- Running time: 22 minutes
- Production companies: BVS Entertainment; Renaissance Atlantic Entertainment; Toei Company, Ltd. Ranger Productions, Ltd.

Original release
- Network: Toon Disney (Jetix)
- Release: February 18 – November 3, 2008

Related
- Power Rangers television series

Power Rangers Jungle Fury is a television series and the fifteenth entry of the Power Rangers franchise, and is an adaptation of Juken Sentai Gekiranger, the thirty-first Japanese Super Sentai series.

The season premiered on February 18, 2008, as part of Jetix on Toon Disney; it would be the last season to air on both entities before the launch of Disney XD in February 2009.

== Plot ==
For over 10,000 years, a spirit of pure evil known as Dai Shi has been locked away and safely guarded by the Pai Zhuq (Note: Sources spell it as both "Zhuq" and "Zhua".) - The Order of the Claw - a secretive Kung Fu clan. The Pai Zhuq select their three top members, Jarrod, Theo Martin, and Lily Chilman, to become the new guardians of Dai Shi. Jarrod's arrogant and bullying nature leads to him being excluded and a rookie named Casey Rhodes is chosen instead.

During the initiation ceremony, Jarrod returns and attacks Master Mao, inadvertently breaking the vessel containing Dai Shi's essence as he does so. The freed Dai Shi kills Master Mao and takes over Jarrod's body. The new guardians travel to the city of Ocean Bluff to seek their new master and find him to be a man named Robert "RJ" James - chef and owner of Jungle Karma Pizza. After testing the guardians, RJ grants them the powers and abilities of Jungle Fury Power Rangers - making them Earth's only hope to stop Dai Shi - who along with his Lieutenant Camille, henchmen Scorch and Snapper, and an army of undead Rinshi warriors is attempting to take over the world and allow animals to rule over humans.

Initially, RJ acts only as Sensei and trainer to the Power Rangers, but as the series progresses he joins their ranks as the Jungle Fury Purple Wolf Ranger. During this time, they are also joined by Dominic "Dom" Hargan who studied with RJ, and Fran - originally a customer then an employee of Jungle Karma Pizza. Dominic joins as the White Rhino Power Ranger, and Fran is enlisted to watch the monitors and advise of Rinshi attacks while RJ is with the other Power Rangers. Eventually, Camille is targeted by Scorch and Snapper who are jealous of her popularity with Dai Shi - although, in reality, it is Jarrod's own human spirit fighting against Dai Shi she is attracted to. As a result, she turns against both them and Dai Shi, enabling Jarrod to throw off its spirit control, and the two join the Power Rangers who use their animal spirits finally to defeat Dai Shi and its forces.

In the epilogue, a more mature and responsible Jarrod goes back to the Pai Zhuq to begin his training again, followed by Camille who later returns as a Power Ranger in her own right. Lily, Theo, and RJ remain at Jungle Karma Pizza. Dominic and Fran backpack around the world and Casey becomes a teacher at the Pai Zhuq - with Jarrod and Camille among his students.

== Cast and characters ==
Jungle Fury Rangers

- Jason Smith as Casey Rhodes, the Jungle Fury Red Ranger
- Anna Hutchison as Lily Chilman, the Jungle Fury Yellow Ranger.
- Aljin Abella as Theo Martin, the Jungle Fury Blue Ranger.
- David de Lautour as Robert "RJ" James, the Jungle Fury Purple Wolf Ranger.
- Nikolai Nikolaeff as Dominic "Dom" Hargan, the Jungle Fury White Rhino Ranger.

Jungle Fury Spirit Rangers

- Bruce Allpress as Master Phant, the Green Elephant Spirit Ranger.
- Oliver Driver as Master Swoop, the Black Bat Spirit Ranger.
- Paul Gittins as Master Finn, the Aqua Shark Spirit Ranger.

Supporting characters

- Sarah Thomson as Fran
- Kelson Henderson as the voice of Flit
- Nathaniel Lees as Master Mao
- Michelle Langstone As Master Guin
- Stig Eldred as Master Rilla
- Andrew Laing as Master Lope

Villains

- Bede Skinner as Jarrod/Dai Shi
- Holly Shanahan as Camille
- Geoff Dolan as the voice of Dai Shi
- Cameron Rhodes as the voice of Carnisoar
- Elisabeth Easther as the voice of Jellica
- Derek Judge as the voice of Grizzaka
- Mark Wright as the voice of Scorch
- Richard Simpson as the voice of Snapper
- Jared Turner as the voice of Whiger

== Production ==
The show's writing staff was impacted by the 2007-08 Writers Guild of America strike. The show's regular writers, including Jackie Marchand and John Tellegen, were on strike. Showrunner Bruce Kalish remained on set in Auckland at Disney's behest, but did not do any writing or offer any input on the production while the strike continued. During this time, Disney enlisted former series writer Judd Lynn, who was at the time not a WGA member, to write episodes under a pseudonym.

Lynn noted that crew members privately thanked him for making sure the production could continue. "Our crew was anywhere from 90 to 130 people, and all those people faced unemployment because of, in this case, a handful of people who were striking in Los Angeles," he said. "It seemed a little unbalanced."

Disney would call on him again in 2009 to helm Power Rangers RPM after the dismissal of showrunner Eddie Guzelian.

== Episodes ==
No.	Title	Directed by	Written by	Original release date
1	"Welcome to the Jungle"	Mark Beesley	Bruce Kalish	February 18, 2008
2	"Welcome to the Jungle"	Mark Beesley	Jackie Marchand	February 18, 2008
Theo, Lily, and rookie Casey, members of the secretive kung fu academy Pai Zhuq (Order of the Claw), are chosen to become the latest guardians the ancient imprisoned spirit, Dai Shi. However, Jarrod, who was rejected from becoming a guardian for his arrogance, accidentally unleashes Dai Shi before fleeing. When Dai Shi destroys Master Mao's physical form, the trio head to Ocean Bluff, seeking their new Master, only to find he is the seemingly inept owner of the Jungle Karma Pizza, RJ. When Dai Shi's minion's attack, Casey finds himself struggling to find his Tiger spirit. Cantor's attack on the city forces the Rangers to desperately need to learn how to bring themselves up to his size. RJ refuses to teach them this skill until they can master their weapons. Casey, still a cub in the Order of the Claw, struggles with the nunchaku. If Theo and Lily can aid him, they may stand a chance of combining their animal spirits to create the Jungle Pride Megazord.
3	"Sigh of the Tiger"	Mark Beesley	John Tellegen	February 25, 2008
Casey requests extra training from RJ and ends up doing seemingly menial housework for him. The buffalo's ancient spirit is harnessed for evil, as Camille brings about Buffalord and Casey soon finds his seemingly pointless chores helped him train. Fran must protect the pizza parlor from its greatest threat: a children's birthday party.
4	"A Taste of Poison"	Charlie Haskell	Jackie Marchand	March 3, 2008
The Rangers are shocked when Dai Shi reveals himself in the body of Jarrod. Dai Shi calls on the Five Fingers of Poison to orchestrate the end of the Rangers. After a nightmare of Jarrod getting revenge on Casey, Lily is worried that Casey might be in danger. She puts herself out there and fights Rantipede. RJ reminds her that they will only win as a team.
5	"Can't Win Them All"	Charlie Haskell	Bruce Kalish	March 10, 2008
Theo is used to being the best and fastest at everything; however, his confidence is smashed when he is made a fool in a battle against Gakko. He gives up and doesn't see the point in anything. Casey and Lily try to protect the city from Gakko as RJ trains Theo. The battle worsens for Casey and Lily. To save his friends, Theo must regain his confidence.
6	"Dance the Night Away"	Charlie Haskell	John Tellegen	March 17, 2008
Theo struggles that his duo with Lily has now become a trio. Camille uses Toady's love for Stingerella to get them to work together to defeat the Rangers. Because of the tension between Casey and Theo, the Rangers can't operate the Claw Cannon. Lily confronts them, telling Casey he is needed on the team, and Theo will always be her best friend.
7	"Pizza Slice of Life"	Vanessa Alexander	David Garber	March 24, 2008
Things become chaotic when RJ leaves Casey in charge of the pizza shop. Casey makes the mistake of letting everyone do what they want. Camille finds out Naja is plotting to overthrow her beloved Dai Shi. She risks her life and takes on a dangerous way of training to protect Dai Shi. Casey learns that every team needs one leader to give directions.
8	"Way of the Master"	Vanessa Alexander	Jackie Marchand	March 31, 2008
Camille sends out Pangolin to attack the city for preparation of the Sky Overlord's resurrection. The Rangers must seek out the Jungle Mace to defeat Pangolin. Unfortunately, Master Phant has left Pai Zhuq and no longer wants to help. Lily still has faith that the old master is still inside of the hermit. Touched by her hope, the master teaches her his techniques of the Elephant.
9	"Good Karma, Bad Karma"	Vanessa Alexander	John Tellegen	April 21, 2008
Casey's $5 tip stolen by a boy named Josh who wants a red kite as the Rangers battle Slickagon. Meanwhile, Carnisoar erases Jarrod's past good deeds to make him a more worthy host for Dai Shi.
10	"Blind Leading the Blind"	Mike Smith	John Tellegen	April 27, 2008
Theo meets Master Swoop, who has the spirit of the Bat as he is also blind and starts to teach Theo the way of the Bat so he can defeat the latest terrors unleashed by Carnisoar.
11	"Pushed to the Edge"	Mike Smith	Jackie Marchand	May 5, 2008
Believing that Carnisoar's training methods are too harsh, Camille disguises herself and talks with Lily by chance. Taking Lily’s well-meaning advice, she decides to find Dai Shi a new master and revives Jellica, the Sea Overlord.
12	"One Master Too Many"	Mike Smith	David Garber	May 12, 2008
As Theo and Lily have found new masters, Casey is eager for his to show up, which makes RJ feel out of place, and things take a turn for the worse when the new master is Master Finn, RJ's estranged father. Casey learns how to use the Shark Spirit, while RJ is eager to show his father the extent of his powers.
13	"Ghost of a Chance"	Jonathan Brough	John Tellegen	May 19, 2008
14	"Ghost of a Chance"	Jonathan Brough	Jackie Marchand	May 19, 2008
With new Zords and weapons, the Rangers are starting to feel unbeatable and are offended when RJ wants them to begin refreshing themselves on some necessary steps. However, it soon turns out that the Rangers aren't the only ones who have been furthering themselves when a more powerful Dai Shi beats them before RJ comes to the rescue. Dai Shi captures him, leaving the Rangers without a master. Then the Rangers go back to the Pai Zhuq Academy, and Master Mao appears and sends them to the Spirit world to train with the fallen masters. As they arrive, the masters take them by surprise and beat them while Dai Shi prepares for his fight with RJ. The fallen masters then train the Rangers by helping them overcome their fears. Meanwhile, at Dai Shi's lair, Dai Shi fights RJ. Back at Jungle Karma Pizza, Fran discovers the Ranger's identities. Then the Rangers come to RJ's rescue with their new Jungle Master Mode and defeat Dai Shi and his guards.
15	"Bad to the Bone"	Jonathan Brough	Bruce Kalish	June 2, 2008
Carnisaur and Jellica conspire to bring forth Grizzaka, and after a battle with a pig Rinshi Beast, the Rangers are given the day off while RJ deals with a pain in his chest. Soon after, they fight Porcupongo, who pricks Lily with one of his quills. This causes her personality to change drastically, becoming a biker girl as a strange Wolf Man appears and attacks Casey and Theo. When Porcupongo appears again, the boys go after him while Lily and Fran argue, eventually making Lily turn back into herself and join the fight against Porcupongo and defeat him.
16	"Friends Don't Fade Away"	Vanessa Alexander	Ally Mondera	June 16, 2008
After battling with Dai Shi, RJ cannot control his Animal Spirit and goes insane. He becomes a wolf and has to be restrained. Fran places her palm on his wolf hand he returns to his human form. She reminds him to ask his friends for help rather than run away. RJ regains control of himself and becomes the Wolf Ranger.
17	"No "I" in Leader"	Vanessa Alexander	William Carter	June 23, 2008
Now that RJ has joined the team, Casey is beginning to doubt himself as the Ranger's leader. Meanwhile, Grizzaka releases a pair of stronger Shadow Guards who give the Rangers a tough time. Master Mao's spirit tries to get Jarrod to free himself from Dai Shi's possession, and unknowingly sends Dai Shi on a quest for the Rhino Nexus.
18	"True Friends, True Spirits"	Vanessa Alexander	Aran Hufee	June 30, 2008
After RJ saves Flit, the little fly becomes an unwanted friend, but only Flit can save him when RJ is in trouble. Meanwhile, Grizzaka releases an evil spirit making RJ lose control of his spirit again.
19	"Path of the Rhino"	Jonathan Brough	Nico Manley	July 7, 2008
Dominic was sent by Master Mao to find a purpose for his life. He finds out that RJ and the others are Rangers and wants to join them. He now knows this is his purpose in life. Casey is dubious, but Dominic proves he has the spirit of the Rhino. Dominic becomes the Rhino Ranger.
20	"Dash for the Dagger"	Jonathan Brough	Sofia Sprittey	July 14, 2008
Dominic and Theo depart for the Control Dagger but are side-tracked with the attack of Whirnado. Meanwhile, Dai Shi returns to the temple where he is imprisoned. Camille attempts to take the Control Dagger, which is the only way into the Rhino Nexus.
21	"Race to the Nexus"	Jonathan Brough	Patrick Skuel	July 21, 2008
With the Control Dagger in hand, Dai Shi aims to unlock the Nexus for himself. The Overlords refuse to let such power fall into the hands of the Rangers or Dai Shi. Having searched all his life for his destiny, Dominic isn't about to let the Overlords or Dai Shi stand in his way. With his friends' help, Dominic can unlock the power of the Rhino Nexus and summons the Rhino Steel Zord to transform into Rhino Steel Megazord and destroy Carnisoar.
22	"Arise the Crystal Eyes"	Jonathan Brough	Casey S. Neki	July 28, 2008
The Rangers learn about the Crystal Eyes, while Dai Shi sends Camille to steal them so he can revive the Phantom Generals, while the Rangers (minus Casey) fight Grizzaka. Casey and Jarrod fight over the Crystal Eyes, while Jellica attempts to steal them. Casey comes to his friends' aid after Dai Shi warns him that they stand no chance against Grizzaka without him. With Casey's added power, they finally destroy Grizzaka.
23	"Fear and the Phantoms"	Mike Smith	Grace Urwin	August 4, 2008
The Phantom Beasts have been brought back to life. Dai Shi has them prove their loyalty by capturing the three masters. The Phantom Beasts capture the three masters and use the masters to create the Spirit Rangers. Also, Master Phant's niece Gabby is having trouble with confidence when it comes to dancing in the public's eye. But with the help of Lily, she overcomes her fears, enters the dance competition and gets 2nd place.
24	"Blue Ranger, Twin Danger"	Mike Smith	KJ Bekman	August 11, 2008
With the masters in their possession, the Phantoms have a new weapon, the Spirit Rangers. Meanwhile, Theo's twin brother Luen (Aljin Abella in a dual role) shows up and causes trouble. One of the Phantom Beasts captures the Rangers within mirror-like discs but mistakenly captures Luen believing him to be Theo. Theo fights the phantom and frees the Rangers, and Luen learns of his brother's secret of being a Ranger. The Ranger's combined might destroys the Phantom Beast. Later RJ is psychically contacted by his father to help in defeating the Spirit Rangers.
25	"One Last Second Chance"	Mike Smith	Ally Mondera	August 18, 2008
By redirecting the Claw Cannon to cancel out the Spirit Rangers, RJ accidentally seals his father, Master Finn, inside one of the Crystal Eyes. Unidoom attempts to throw it into the ocean, but Flit gives it to RJ, who brings his father back. They free Masters Swoop & Phant, and the Jungle Rangers & Spirit Rangers unite to destroy Unidoom.
26	"Don't Blow That Dough"	Mark Beesley	John Tellegen	September 29, 2008
Casey, Theo, Dominic, and Lily are trapped inside RJ's televisions and put into a gameshow/clip-show called Blow That Dough against three former Rinshi Beasts. Dominic, Theo, and Lily lose, but Casey wins, and when RJ sends the Morphers, it ends the game.
27	"Tigers Fall, Lions Rise"	Luke Robinson	John Edward	October 6, 2008
The Rangers fight Whiger and the other Phantom Beast Generals have given Camille their power and the Phoenix Spirit, and Dai Shi the Griffin Spirit, and made him their king. Whiger steals Casey's Tiger Spirit, and the Rangers are easily defeated without his help. When Whiger attacks again, Casey goes to Jungle Master Mode to help save the others and his martial arts students, powering the Claw Cannon with a student's Tiger Spirit. Whiger is defeated by the Megazords and flees.
28	"The Spirit of Kindness"	Luke Robinson	Moni Zamazene	October 13, 2008
Whiger was only able to steal the Tiger Spirit from Casey, but not destroy Casey. For his failure, Dai Shi strips him of his power, and he is left to fade away. Casey shows his kindness to Whiger even though they were battling. Whiger rethinks which side he should be on. He helps Casey save his friends who have been captured in giant rattraps. Together they defeat Camille, but Whiger fades to nothing after using up the last of his powers. With the Rangers reunited, they destroy the two phantom beasts with their animal spirits, and afterward, Casey acknowledges that they couldn't have won without Whiger. Later Snapper and Scorch begin to scheme of getting rid of Camille.
29	"Maryl and the Monkeys"	Luke Robinson	Bruce Kalish	October 20, 2008
Camille steals a potion from Maryl with the ability to clone Monkeys. She and Dai Shi give it to the Monkey Phantom Beast-Warrior Grinder and uses it to unleash clones of itself throughout the city. Dominic soon destroys Grinder. Dai Shi also realizes that Scorch and Snapper conspired against Camille and stopped her successful plan.
30	"To Earn Your Stripes"	Mark Beesley	Jackie Marchand	October 27, 2008
RJ takes Casey, Theo, and Lily to the Pai Zhuq temple for the final test before they earn the rank of Pai Zhuq Master, defeating Masters Finn, Swoop, and Phant in battle. Although Theo and Lily pass and earn their Master's stripes, Casey fails and, feeling dejected, goes out on his own. Meanwhile, Dai Shi starts to lose control over Jarrod as he struggles to break free, so Scorch and Snapper send Sonimax, Osirus, and Lepus to destroy Camille because they think she is the cause. Casey witnesses Jarrod saving Camille and sees that there is some good left in Jarrod. In the end, Jarrod gains control long enough to destroy Sonimax and Osirus, while the Rangers use their Megazords to destroy Lepus. Dai Shi regains control, and Casey, although confident that Jarrod still exists inside Dai Shi, still needs to work out why he failed his test to earn Master's stripes.
31	"Path of the Righteous"	Mark Beesley	John Tellegen	November 3, 2008
Casey is convinced there is good left in Jarrod, enough to break Dai Shi's control, but the others doubt him because even before he was possessed, Jarrod was a bully to those weaker than he was. Undeterred by his friends' doubts and Master Mao's orders not to pursue the issue, he faces Dai Shi at his lair to bring out the goodness in Jarrod. After a hard battle, Casey allows Dai Shi to destroy him and, as a result, Jarrod expels him before he can strike. The two leave the temple with Camille, who also rebels against Dai Shi to protect Jarrod, but are attacked by Scorch and Snapper. The other Rangers arrive, and Jarrod and Camille join forces to defeat the two Phantom Generals. Scorch becomes a giant, gets beaten by the Stampede Formation, including Jarrod and Camille's spirit animals. For acting on his instincts instead of copying his friends, Casey finally earns his Master stripes while Jarrod runs off, feeling guilty over the trouble he's caused and the evil he unleashed.
32	"Now the Final Fury"	Mark Beesley	Jackie Marchand	November 3, 2008
Scorch is back again with an army of Rinshi invading the city. Dai Shi now has enough power to open a portal to the spirit world and bring back all of his fallen troops. The Rangers are joined by all the masters and the Spirit Rangers and destroy all of the revived villains and Scorch. Furious, Dai Shi finally reveals his true form (a gigantic hydra-like dragon) and targets the Red Ranger. Jarrod tries to shake the conviction in his heart, but Camille decides to join the Rangers. RJ and Dominic form the WolfPride and Rhino Steel Megazords but are defeated. Then Jarrod tells Dai Shi that he was wrong in saying he didn't have the lion's heart, then Jarrod attacked and weakened Dai Shi with his Zocato power. Master Mao states that only the three chosen ones can destroy Dai Shi for good. "A Pai Zhuq Master doesn't ask, he knows. There is a higher level of animal spirits. One that has never been reached before by a student or Master. It's time to push beyond the possible, to our highest potential." Then Casey, Lily and Theo launch a blast towards Dai Shi, which destroys him. After that, Casey starts to teach at the academy with Jarrod and Camille starting all over again, Theo finally asks Lily for a date, RJ starts working with Flit, now human also, and Dom goes on a tour with Fran.
