= Power Rangers Lightspeed Rescue =

American television series

- Genre: Action adventure Science fantasy Superhero; Comedy Drama
- Created by: Haim Saban; Toei Company
- Based on: Kyuukyuu Sentai GoGoFive by Toei Company
- Developed by: Saban Entertainment; Toei Company
- Showrunner: Judd Lynn
- Directed by: Ryuta Tasaki; Koichi Sakamoto; Isaac Florentine; Jonathan Tzachor; Judd Lynn; Worth Keeter; Makoto Yokoyama
- Starring: Michael Chaturantabut; Sean Cw Johnson; Alison MacInnis; Keith Robinson; Sasha Williams; Monica Louwerens; Ron Roggé; Jennifer L. Yen; Rhett Fisher
- Theme music composer: Jeremy Sweet
- Composers: Lior Rosner; Jeremy Sweet; Inon Zur; Shuki Levy; Kussa Mahchi
- Countries of origin: United States; Japan
- Original language: English
- No. of episodes: 40

Production
- Executive producers: Haim Saban; Shuki Levy
- Producer: Jonathan Tzachor
- Production locations: California (Greater Los Angeles Area) (Santa Clarita & Los Angeles); Japan (Greater Tokyo Area) (Tokyo, Saitama, Yokohama and Kyoto)
- Cinematography: Ilan Rosenberg; Sean McLin (2nd unit)
- Running time: 20 minutes
- Production companies: Saban Entertainment; Renaissance Atlantic Entertainment; Toei Company, Ltd. MMPR Productions, Inc.

Original release
- Network: Fox (Fox Kids)
- Release: February 12 – November 18, 2000

Related
- Power Rangers television series

Power Rangers Lightspeed Rescue is a television series and the seventh entry of the Power Rangers franchise, based on the 23rd Super Sentai series Kyuukyuu Sentai GoGoFive (1999).

Lightspeed Rescue had, for the first time, a Power Ranger with no Super Sentai counterpart in the Titanium Ranger, as there was no Titanium Ranger in GoGoFive, which makes it the first season to have an American-exclusive Ranger.

== Synopsis ==
In Mariner Bay, California, a group of demons led by Diabolico and Queen Bansheera are accidentally released from their tomb and plot to destroy the city. A government organization called Lightspeed, headed by Captain William Mitchell, recruits five citizens -- firefighter Carter Grayson, lifeguard and marine animal trainer Chad Lee, stunt pilot Joel Rawlings, extreme sports athlete Kelsey Winslow, and Mitchell's paramedic daughter Dana -- to defend the city as Power Rangers after Lightspeed successfully channels the source of their powers, the Morphin' Grid. Amidst their battles against the demons, the Rangers are joined by Mitchell's long lost son Ryan Mitchell, who was initially forced to fight for the demons until he sees the error of his ways.

== Cast and characters ==
Lightspeed Rangers

- Sean Cw Johnson as Carter Grayson, the Red Lightspeed Ranger
- Michael Chaturantabut as Chad Lee, the Blue Lightspeed Ranger
- Keith Robinson as Joel Rawlings, the Green Lightspeed Ranger
- Sasha Williams as Kelsey Winslow, the Yellow Lightspeed Ranger
- Alison MacInnis as Dana Mitchell, the Pink Lightspeed Ranger
- Rhett Fisher as Ryan Mitchell, the Titanium Ranger

Supporting characters

- Monica Louwerens as Ms. Angela Fairweather
- Ron Roggé as Captain William Mitchell

Villains

- Jennifer L. Yen as Vypra
- Diane Salinger as the voice of Queen Bansheera
- Neil Kaplan as the voice of Diabolico
- Michael Forest as the voice of Prince Olympius
  - Brianne Siddall as the voice of Impus
- David Lodge as the voice of Loki
- Kim Strauss as the voice of Jinxer

Guest stars

- Danny Slavin as Leo Corbett, Galaxy Red
- Reggie Rolle as Damon Henderson, Galaxy Green
- Archie Kao as Kai Chen, Galaxy Blue
- Cerina Vincent as Maya, Galaxy Yellow
- Valerie Vernon as Kendrix Morgan, Galaxy Pink
- Jennifer Burns as Trakeena

== Video game ==
Several video games based on Power Rangers Lightspeed Rescue were also developed and available for Nintendo 64, Game Boy Color, PlayStation, and PC. The PlayStation and N64 versions were 3D beat-em up games, the Game Boy version was a 2D side-scrolling platformer, and the PC version was actually an activity center.

== Episodes ==
| No. | Title | Directed by | Written by | Original release date |
|---|---|---|---|---|
| 1 | "Operation Lightspeed" | Ryuta Tasaki | Judd Lynn | February 12, 2000 |
A group of demons are accidentally released by some nomads and are now trying to destroy Mariner Bay to release their leader Queen Bansheera. To counter the demons, Captain Mitchell's daughter Dana Mitchell and two men in black recruit four individuals for Lightspeed to become Power Rangers. These individuals are Carter Grayson, Chad Lee, Joel Rawlings, and Kelsey Winslow. They agree to Captain Mitchell's proposal, with Dana joining them as the fifth ranger. They battle and destroy the fire demon Ghouligan (who Carter briefly glimpsed before his recruitment) and a group of Batlings, and their journey as Rangers begins.
| 2 | "Lightspeed Teamwork" | Ryuta Tasaki | Judd Lynn | February 19, 2000 |
Captain Mitchell is giving the other Rangers a tour of the Aqua Base, and they are introduced to the Rail Rescues. Meanwhile, Joel meets Ms. Angela Fairweather, the Rangers' scientist, and weapons designer, and instantly falls in love, while neglecting his obligation to the Rangers. The others witness a rock that's hit Mariner Bay and is transforming into Magmavore. To stop Magmavore, the Rangers try their new Rail Rescues, which release smaller Rescue Zords to assist in their efforts to escort people trapped in an elevator. However, Joel continues to insist that he could help alone but eventually works with the Rangers as a team to form the Lightspeed Megazord to defeat Magmavore.
| 3 | "Trial By Fire" | Ryuta Tasaki | Judd Lynn | February 26, 2000 |
The Rangers are going through training. Carter gets the fastest time, but he had the lowest score because - according to Captain Mitchell - Carter has failed to think about the situation before using his blaster. Later, Vypra creates an earthquake to attack Mariner Bay and traps a little boy with a wall of fire. Carter tries to rescue the boy, but Captain Mitchell tells Carter to put out the fire first. Carter reluctantly cooperates, but the boy is injured. Furious, Carter believes that he isn't cut out for being a Ranger, but Captain Mitchell disagrees and sends him off to help his friends in the battle against Quakemon.
| 4 | "Riding the Edge" | Koichi Sakamoto | Judd Lynn | March 4, 2000 |
While rollerblading, Kelsey saves a dog named Dorsey from getting hit by a car. Nancy, its owner, is later seen on television by Kelsey and Dana on a short Space Shuttle mission. Meanwhile, a tornado monster called Whirlin is attempting to destroy the city just as the Rangers meet Diabolico. They call for the Rescue Bird and kill it, but the shuttle gets caught in the tornado. As a result, the Rangers summon the Rail Rescues and gain control of the shuttle. Kelsey gets it to land on top of Rail Rescue 4 and is successful, but Jinxer grows the monster.
| 5 | "A Matter of Trust" | Koichi Sakamoto | Judd Lynn | March 11, 2000 |
Dana questions her father's faith in her abilities as a Ranger when he sends her on a seemingly unimportant assignment to pick up an old friend as the other Rangers are assigned to guard a fuel cell. When one of Diabolico's monsters named Fireor turns up the heat in Mariner Bay, she discovers that the Rangers were guarding a decoy and the real fuel cell's safety lies in her hands. She escapes Vypra and gets the fuel cell to the Aquabase, in just enough time to help her friends destroy Fireor.
| 6 | "Wheels of Destruction" | Isaac Florentine | Judd Lynn | March 18, 2000 |
Vypra's new battle vehicle has the Rangers on the ropes until they defeat her with their new Lightspeed Cycles. Meanwhile, Joel unsuccessfully tries to ask Ms. Fairweather out on a date.
| 7 | "Cyborg Rangers" | Isaac Florentine | Judd Lynn | March 25, 2000 |
A team of robotic Cyborg Rangers are created by scientists working for General McKnight in order to replace the Rangers who are subsequently dismissed from their roles. But when they go haywire thanks to an attack from the lightning demon Strikning, the heroes must violate their dismissal and resume their Ranger duties to stop both Strikning and the Cyborg Rangers. General McKnight apologizes and vows never to interfere with the Rangers again.
| 8 | "Up to the Challenge" | Koichi Sakamoto | Jackie Marchand | April 1, 2000 |
Kelsey's reckless behavior lands her in the hospital when she gets caught in an explosion. Meanwhile, Chad must deal with a rival who makes a deal with Vypra for the power and skill to destroy him.
| 9 | "Go Volcanic" | Koichi Sakamoto | Judd Lynn | April 8, 2000 |
The arrival of Queen Bansheera prompts an attack on a volcano, which threatens to erupt and destroy Mariner Bay. Meanwhile, Dana deals with a hostage situation on a bus before joining the Rangers in dousing the Trifire monster's flames and saving the city from disaster.
| 10 | "Rising from Ashes" | Koichi Sakamoto | Judd Lynn | April 15, 2000 |
Queen Bansheera resurrects Magmavore and Trifire and gives them great power in their advanced forms. When the Lightspeed Megazord is not enough, the Rangers must summon Ms. Fairweather's newest creation - the Supertrain Megazord, which is created by combining the Rail Rescues.
| 11 | "From Deep in the Shadows" | Jonathan Tzachor | Judd Lynn | April 22, 2000 |
After Mitchell and Dana celebrate Ryan's birthday, Lightspeed's experimental Titanium Morpher, which was determined to be too dangerous, is stolen and Diabolico unleashes the evil Titanium Ranger. The Rangers can defeat him with their new V-Lancers, but are unable to destroy him because he is revealed to be Captain Mitchell's son Ryan!
| 12 | "Truth Discovered" | Jonathan Tzachor | Judd Lynn | April 29, 2000 |
Following the emotional breakdowns of Captain Mitchell and Dana, the Titanium Ranger goes on another rampage through Mariner Bay, and the heartbroken Dana tries to stop her older brother single-handedly. When Captain Mitchell reveals the truth to Ryan - that he had no choice but to let Diabolico save him as they hung off the cliff - Ryan thinks twice about being evil and gives up his morpher.
| 13 | "Ryan's Destiny" | Ryuta Tasaki | Judd Lynn & Jackie Marchand | May 6, 2000 |
Diabolico unleashes his three most powerful monsters Demonite, Thunderon, and Falkar who threaten the city with explosive feathers. The Rangers are no match against them until Ryan comes to terms with his evil past and becomes the Titanium Ranger to fight for good. However, Ryan is penalized in his dream for his treason against Diabolico through a Cobra tattoo, which will slither up his back every time he morphs until it reaches his neck and bites, thus destroying him. When he wakes up, Ryan finds the cobra tattoo on his back.
| 14 | "Curse of the Cobra" | Ryuta Tasaki | Judd Lynn & Jackie Marchand | May 13, 2000 |
Demonite, Thunderon, and Falkar attack the city once more, this time with advantages - Demonite creates a powerful clone, and Ryan is weakened by the cobra tattoo. Carter's risky move of firing point-blank at Demonite with the Unilaser and V-Lancer destroys the two. Later, Captain Mitchell discovers the cobra tattoo after overhearing him talk with Carter about it and prohibits Ryan from morphing.
| 15 | "Strength of the Sun" | Ryuta Tasaki | Judd Lynn & Jackie Marchand | May 20, 2000 |
Thunderon and Falkar launch a final assault on the Rangers, who are short the Titanium Ranger. When both increase in size and take down the Supertrain Megazord, Ryan risks his life and helps them out in the Max Solarzord, destroying both monsters.
| 16 | "The Cobra Strikes" | Judd Lynn | Judd Lynn & Jackie Marchand | May 27, 2000 |
Diabolico brings back his three generals merged as one monster Troika which the Rangers destroy with their new Battle Boosters. Diabolico battles the Rangers himself, taking down the Supertrain Megazord. Ryan finds the cobra tattoo's power source, a cobra monster from the tomb, and destroys it, lifting the curse. He joins the Rangers and helps them defeat Diabolico with a new Zord combination - the Lightspeed Solarzord. However, Diabolico's Star Power is transferred to Queen Bansheera's son Impus who begins a startling transformation.
| 17 | "Olympius Ascends" | Ryuta Tasaki | Judd Lynn & Jackie Marchand | August 19, 2000 |
Impus completes his transformation into Olympius, who has captured four Rangers and infiltrates the Aquabase by posing as them. His plot is uncovered by Carter, who weakens him by throwing him into the water, and frees his friends.
| 18 | "A Face from the Past" | Ryuta Tasaki | Judd Lynn & Jackie Marchand | August 26, 2000 |
When a monster sets a power plant ablaze, Captain Mitchell jumps into action and braves the fire to rescue a little girl. The incident reveals to Carter that it was Captain Mitchell who had saved him from a fire when he was a child.
| 19 | "The Queen's Return" | Ryuta Tasaki | Judd Lynn & Jackie Marchand | September 2, 2000 |
The demons perform a ritual to return Queen Bansheera to her bodily form. The Rangers interrupt the ceremony, but only enough to bring back the Queen in a deformed state, for which Olympius swears vengeance. Ryan decides that he will leave the Aquabase to go after the Queen, and promises Dana he will return.
| 20 | "The Omega Project" | Koichi Sakamoto | Judd Lynn & Jackie Marchand | September 9, 2000 |
Joel is visiting a young friend, Simon, who invents a telescope to observe outer space. However, Simon discovers that an asteroid is approaching the Earth, which was sent by Olympius to impact Mariner Bay. To stop it, the Rangers initiate the Omega Project, which consists of the Omega Zords - five spacecraft, which combine into the Omega Crawler and the Omega Megazord.
| 21 | "The Fifth Crystal" | Koichi Sakamoto | Judd Lynn & Jackie Marchand | September 16, 2000 |
Vypra steals a powerful set of crystals to power a laser, which will destroy Mariner Bay. Kelsey teams up with her estranged grandmother to destroy the laser and retrieve the crystals. Note: This episode was dedicated to Robert L. Manahan, who died on June 30, 2000. He was the voice of Zordon in Mighty Morphin Power Rangers through Power Rangers in Space.
| 22 | "The Chosen Path" | Worth Keeter | John Fletcher & Jackie Marchand | September 23, 2000 |
A monster named Cyclopter trains with Chad's old sensei, who resents him for becoming a Ranger and not following the path of a martial artist. The monster uses his training to battle the Rangers, but is defeated by Chad, who makes peace with his former mentor, and recalls his training.
| 23 | "Yesterday Again" | Issac Florentine | Judd Lynn & Jackie Marchand | September 30, 2000 |
A simulation goes awry when Carter's day repeats itself. He uses his knowledge of the future and his new Mobile Armored Vehicle, to prevent the Rangers' deaths at the hands of Olympius, who attempts to use their Rescuebird against them.
| 24 | "As Time Runs Out" | Isaac Florentine | Judd Lynn & Jackie Marchand | October 7, 2000 |
The Rangers take the Max Solarzord to space to prevent spores attached to them from going off and releasing toxins into the atmosphere. Meanwhile, Loki and Vypra resurrect Diabolico after Olympius betrays them.
| 25 | "In the Freeze Zone" | Ryuta Tasaki | Judd Lynn & Jackie Marchand | October 21, 2000 |
Freezard captures four Rangers, with only Carter, left to face him and Olympius. Olympius has his problems, as Diabolico returns looking for payback. Bansheera keeps Diabolico in check and sends her son to get Carter, who defeats Freezard and frees his friends with the new Thermo Blaster.
| 26 | "The Mighty Mega Battles" | Ryuta Tasaki | Judd Lynn & Jackie Marchand | October 28, 2000 |
Joel becomes jealous when he mistakes Clark, Ms. Fairweather's brother, for her boyfriend. She brought him to the Aquabase to help design the new Mega Battle Armor, which Joel and Chad use to defeat Infinitor. Ms. Fairweather later assures Joel that Clark was just her brother.
| 27 | "The Great Egg Caper" | Ryuta Tasaki | Judd Lynn & Jackie Marchand | November 3, 2000 |
Jinxer loses an egg containing a powerful monster to a smart thief who the Rangers are also after. His plot to hold the egg for ransom backfires when Jinxer and the monster Birdbane attack him, but he is saved by Kelsey, who discovers the thief has a heart of gold.
| 28 | "Ocean Blue" | Jonathan Tzachor | Judd Lynn & Jackie Marchand | November 4, 2000 |
Vypra uses Chad's love interest, a mermaid named Marina, to lure him into a trap. When Marina's life is endangered, Chad summons the strength and courage to defeat Vypra and Loki and rescue her. The two reunite, but only to part ways soon after.
| 29 | "Trakeena's Revenge" | Ryuta Tasaki | Judd Lynn | November 6, 2000 |
| 30 | "Trakeena's Revenge" | Ryuta Tasaki | Judd Lynn | November 7, 2000 |
Trakeena, the enemy of the Galaxy Rangers, returns to destroy Earth as vengeance for her defeat, but first, she must absorb enough human life force for power. Leo travels to Earth to team up with the Lightspeed Rangers to stop her. Chad, Joel, Kelsey, and Dana fight the Ghouls to protect Leo, who was fighting off an injury, and Leo destroys them with his Quasar Saber. Meanwhile, Carter is helping a girl whose parents have been taken by a monster, only to be attacked by more Ghouls but is saved by Kai and Maya. The eight rangers later battle more Ghouls while Carter tries to fight Triskull, but Triskull defeats all eight Rangers. Olympius and his demons enter the fray, sabotaging Trakeena's power drain and mutating her into a giant, maddened creature. While the rangers try to free Trakeena's hostages, Carter and Leo defeat Triskull and are aided by Damon and Kendrix, but they are soon blasted out the window. As a result, the two teams summon the Omega and Galaxy Megazords, but Trakeena still lives, causing her to disengage the Galactabeasts. The two teams then destroy Trakeena with the Lights of Orion-powered Omega Megazord. Guest Stars: Archie Kao, Reggie Rolle, Danny Slavin, Valerie Vernon and Cerina Vincent
| 31 | "The Last Ranger" | Worth Keeter | John Fletcher & Jackie Marchand | November 8, 2000 |
An evil monster named Memorase gives four of the Rangers amnesia. Dana holds it off long enough for Ms. Fairweather to restore the Rangers' memories. When they rejoin the battle, they defeat the demon with the Thermo Blasters and the Lightspeed Solarzord.
| 32 | "Sorcerer of the Sands" | Worth Keeter | John Fletcher & Jackie Marchand | November 9, 2000 |
The Rangers are transported into the Shadow World by Olympius and Gatekeeper where they face invincible dead monsters. They escape with the help of the Sorcerer of the Sands who Ryan found in hopes of discovering a way to imprison the demons. Olympius remains trapped in the underworld and Diabolico kills the Sorcerer in a battle of spells.
| 33 | "Olympius Unbound" | Ryuta Tasaki | John Fletcher & Jackie Marchand | November 10, 2000 |
Jinxer manipulates Captain Mitchell into providing Olympius with enough energy to destroy the Rangers after he escapes the Shadow World with Gatekeeper. When Ms. Fairweather interrupts the power feed, the star power is destroyed, allowing the Rangers to defeat the demon prince.
| 34 | "Neptune's Daughter" | Jonathan Tzachor | John Fletcher & Jackie Marchand | November 11, 2000 |
Marina returns to ask for Chad's help after her father's trident is stolen, which a water demon named Aquafiend uses to drain the water from Mariner Bay. Chad recovers the trident, as well as a captive Marina, and safely returns the two to Neptune: God of the Sea.
| 35 | "Web War" | Ryuta Tasaki | John Fletcher & Jackie Marchand | November 13, 2000 |
A spider monster named Arachnor captures four Rangers and the Lightspeed staff. Using the experimental Trans Armor Cycle, Carter defeats Arachnor and the Vyprari to save his friends.
| 36 | "In the Limelight" | Judd Lynn | Judd Lynn & Jackie Marchand | November 14, 2000 |
Dana's new modeling job jeopardizes her performance as a Ranger. She makes a difficult decision to quit modeling to help her friends defeat Treevil.
| 37 | "Wrath of the Queen" | Judd Lynn | John Fletcher, Jackie Marchand & Denise Skinner | November 15, 2000 |
With four Rangers trapped, Carter has a decisive showdown in the Skull Cavern with Bansheera, who has already killed Vypra and Loki in her quest for power. When he strikes her with a battle booster, Carter and his teammates escape the Skull Cavern. Diabolico vows revenge against Bansheera to avenge Loki.
| 38 | "Rise of the Super Demons" | Judd Lynn | Judd Lynn & Jackie Marchand | November 16, 2000 |
Olympius captures and enslaves Diabolico, and uses him to battle the Rangers and destroy their Megazords. They are just barely bailed out by the new Lifeforce Megazord, which feeds off their life energy to destroy both demons. During their victory, however, Jinxer places a Batling Card on the Lifeforce Megazord.
| 39 | "The Fate of Lightspeed" | Ryuta Tasaki & Makoto Yokoyama | Judd Lynn & Jackie Marchand | November 17, 2000 |
| 40 | "The Fate of Lightspeed" | Ryuta Tasaki & Makoto Yokoyama | Judd Lynn & Jackie Marchand | November 18, 2000 |
Queen Bansheera begins a ceremony that will release all the demons from the Shadow World to Earth. Jinxer's card activates, releasing hundreds of Batlings into the Aquabase. The Rangers are forced to evacuate the Aquabase, but they later become trapped. The Omega and Lifeforce Megazords are then taken over by the Batlings. Bansheera holds the ceremony and brings the Skull Cavern to Mariner Bay, where the ceremony was to take place. Four Rangers evacuate the Aquabase on a submarine and fire torpedoes at the hijacked Lifeforce Megazord, causing the Megazord and the base to explode. Carter and Ryan ram the Mobile Armor Vehicle into the Omega Megazord, destroying it. During the final battle, Carter kicks Bansheera into the Skull Cavern's tomb, causing it to crumble. With the Demons gone, the Rangers return their morphers and then resume their normal lives.
