= Power Rangers Beast Morphers =

American television series

- Genre: Action-adventure; Cyberpunk; Superhero
- Created by: Haim Saban; Toei Company
- Based on: Tokumei Sentai Go-Busters by Toei Company
- Developed by: Saban Brands (pre-production); Hasbro/Allspark Pictures (post-production); Toei Company
- Showrunner: Judd "Chip" Lynn
- Directed by: Simon Bennett; Yuji Noguchi; Oliver Driver; Riccardo Pellizzeri
- Creative directors: Becca Barnes; Alwyn Dale; Judd "Chip" Lynn
- Starring: See below
- Theme music composer: Noam Kaniel; Cash Callaway; Ian Osborne
- Opening theme: "Power Rangers Beast Morphers" performed by Cash Callaway
- Composers: Matt McGuire; Noam Kaniel; Youssef "Joe" Guezoum; Cash Callaway; Ian Osborne
- Countries of origin: United States; Japan
- Original language: English
- No. of seasons: 2
- No. of episodes: 44

Production
- Executive producers: Judd "Chip" Lynn; Brian Casentini; Brian Goldner; Haim Saban; Stephen Davis
- Producers: Melissa Flores; Becca Barnes; Alwyn Dale
- Production locations: New Zealand (Auckland Region) (Auckland); Japan (Greater Tokyo Area) (Tokyo, Saitama, Yokohama) and Kyoto)
- Cinematography: Kevin Riley; Sean Mclin (2nd unit)
- Camera setup: Single-camera
- Running time: 22 minutes
- Production companies: Allspark Pictures; Power Rangers Productions; Toei Company

Original release
- Network: Nickelodeon
- Release: March 2, 2019 – December 12, 2020

Related
- Power Rangers television series

Power Rangers Beast Morphers is a television series and the twenty-first entry of the Power Rangers franchise. The first season premiered on Nickelodeon on March 2, 2019, while the second season premiered on February 22, and concluded on December 12, 2020.

Beast Morphers was the only television series to be produced by Hasbro's production studio Allspark before it was absorbed into Entertainment One in October 2020, as well as the first in the franchise to have all toys manufactured and distributed by Hasbro. Both seasons were produced using footage, costumes, and props from the thirty-sixth entry in the Japanese long-running tokusatsu drama Super Sentai series, Tokumei Sentai Go-Busters which aired in 2012. The series also serves as a direct sequel to Power Rangers RPM (2009).

Beast Morphers was originally to be produced by Saban Brands. During pre-production, Hasbro acquired the Power Rangers franchise and other entertainment assets from Saban Brands and the latter company subsequently closed on July 2, 2018.

== Plot ==
Scientists in the city of Coral Harbor have discovered a way to convert the infinite power of the Morphin Grid into a physical substance called "Morph-X", providing the city with a source of unlimited clean energy. To protect the city, a secret agency known as Grid Battleforce combines Morph-X with animal DNA to create a new team of Power Rangers. Now the Beast Morpher Rangers – Devon Daniels, Ravi Shaw, and Zoey Reeves – must defend the Morphin Grid from Evox, an evil sentient computer virus from another dimension and his evil avatar clones of the original Ranger candidates Blaze and Roxy, who were rendered comatose. After the three of them are transported to the Cyber Dimension, Evox, Cybervillain Blaze, and Cybervillain Roxy gain its de facto ruler Scrozzle as an ally as he helps them in their plan to return Evox to Earth.

As the Rangers battle Evox's robot monsters called Robotrons, they gain two new additions to the team: Nate Silva, the head researcher and scientist of Grid Battleforce who becomes the Gold Ranger and Steel, a robot Nate was forced to create as a body for Evox, who gains sentience and becomes the Silver Ranger.

In the second season, Evox possesses Mayor Daniels and plots to finish what he started with the help of Scrozzle, who uses a machine to revive the Blaze and Roxy avatars as robots. Along the way, the Rangers uncover Evox's true origins and receive help from the Mighty Morphin, Dino Thunder, and Dino Charge Rangers as well as allies of the Ranger Operators to defeat Evox and his minions once and for all.

== Cast and characters ==
Rangers

- Rorrie D. Travis as Devon Daniels, the Red Beast Morpher Ranger.
- Jazz Baduwalia as Ravi Shaw, the Blue Beast Morpher Ranger.
- Jacqueline Scislowski as Zoey Reeves, the Yellow Beast Morpher Ranger.
- Abraham Rodriguez as Nathan "Nate" Silva, the Gold Beast Morpher Ranger.
- Jamie Linehan (voice) and Sam Jellie (human) as Steel Silva, the Silver Beast Morpher Ranger.

Supporting characters

- Kelson Henderson as the voice of Cruise
- Charlie McDermott as the voice of Smash
- Emmett Skilton as the voice of Jax
- Kristina Ho as Betty Burke
- Cosme Flores as Ben Burke
- Kevin Copeland as Adam Daniels
- Teuila Blakely as Commander Shaw
- Sia Trokenheim as Muriel Reeves
- Mark Wright as General Burke
- Colby Strong as Blaze
- Liana Ramirez as Roxy
- Miriama Smith as Regina Collins
- Madeleine Adams as Megan
- Molly Leishman as Kerry Dixon
- Jack Buchanan as Captain Chaku
- Lina Clare as Starlight
- Mel Odedra as Bruce Silva
- Rachel Foreman as Cheryl Silva

Villains

- Andrew Laing as the voice of Evox/Venjix (Note: Laing is credited as his pseudonym "Randall Ewing" for most of the series' run)
- Campbell Cooley as the voice of Scrozzle
- Colby Strong as Cybervillain Blaze and Robo-Blaze
- Liana Ramirez as Cybervillain Roxy and Robo-Roxy
- Jamie Linehan as the voice of Vargoyle
- Kevin Keys as the voice of Ryjack

Guest stars

- Brennan Mejia as Tyler Navarro, the Dino Charge Red Ranger.
- James Davies as Chase Randall, the Dino Charge Black Ranger.
- Yoshi Sudarso as Koda, the Dino Charge Blue Ranger.
- Davi Santos as Sir Ivan, the Dino Charge Gold Ranger.
- Austin St. John as Jason Lee Scott, the Mighty Morphin Red Ranger.
- Olivia Tennet as Doctor K
- Richard Simpson as the voice of Keeper
- James Gaylyn as Colonel Mason Truman
- Adam Gardiner as the voice of Sledge
- Jackie Clarke as the voice of Poisandra
- Paul Harrop as the voice of Fury
- Estevez Gillespie as the voices of Wrench and Curio
- Adrian Smith as the voice of Goldar Maximus
- Camille Hyde as Shelby Watkins, the Dino Charge Pink Ranger (voice only; uncredited)
- Michael Taber as Riley Griffin, the Dino Charge Green Ranger (voice only; uncredited)
- Dan Musgrove as Conner McKnight, the Red Dino Ranger (voice only; uncredited)

== Episodes ==
=== Season 1 (2019) ===
No. overall	No. in season	Title	Directed by	Written by	Original release date	U.S. viewers (millions)
1	1	"Beasts Unleashed"	Simon Bennett and Yuji Noguchi	Chip Lynn	March 2, 2019	0.73
Scientists tap into the Morphin Grid, providing the city of Coral Harbor with an unlimited source of clean energy called Morph-X. In order to protect it, the organization Grid Battleforce selects three teenage cadets to form a new team of Power Rangers to defend the Grid from evil. However, Coral Harbor's Mayor, Adam Daniels, is skeptical of their idea. When the organization initiates the formation of their Ranger team, an evil sentient computer virus, Evox, corrupts the technology and incapacitates two of the cadets, creating evil Ranger avatars in their place. Mayor Daniels' son, Devon, who trespassed into Grid Battleforce's facilities, and laundry girl Zoey Reeves stumble across the crisis and save the last standing cadet Ravi Shaw, with all three morphing into Rangers in the midst of the battle. With their new powers, the three Rangers defeat the two avatars and Evox and send them to another location. Afterwards, the trio discover that the real cadets, Blaze and Roxy, are in a coma. The remaining Rangers are then drafted in as Rangers.
2	2	"Evox’s Revenge"	Simon Bennett	Story by : Becca Barnes & Alwyn Dale; Teleplay by : Johnny Hartmann	March 9, 2019	0.61
Evox, Blaze, and Roxy are transported to the Cyber Dimension, where they join forces with its ruler Scrozzle and his army of Tronics and prepare to gather as much Morph-X as possible to send Evox back to Earth. Meanwhile, Grid Battleforce’s Commander Shaw intends to select a leader for the team, but Zoey and Ravi fight over who should get the job while Devon is more focused on the new technology that chief scientist Nate Silva has created for them. The Rangers are later introduced to their Beast Bot companions: Cruise, Smash, and Jax, and then to their assigned Zords. During their first battle against the avatar Blaze and his accompanying forces, the Rangers develop serious problems due to Evox's virus partially corrupting their powers: Devon freezes upon seeing a dog, Ravi goes on a rampage from overheating, and Zoey loses her energy. As the battle continues, Scrozzle sends a giant Gigadrone to the city, prompting Commander Shaw to deploy the Racer Zord for Devon. When he freezes up upon seeing a billboard of another dog, his comrades assist him in their Chopper and Wheeler Zords, allowing Devon to finish off the foe. The team are later commended by Commander Shaw for their accomplishments.
3	3	"End of the Road"	Oliver Driver	Story by : Becca Barnes & Alwyn Dale; Teleplay by : Patrick Rieger	March 16, 2019	0.74
Zoey learns of Mayor Daniels' intentions to tear down a forest to build a new highway. As such, she tries to convince the citizens of Coral Harbor, with help from her journalist mother Muriel, to use Morph-X powered bikes instead of cars. Meanwhile, Blaze uses this opportunity to siphon Morph-X from the bikes with assistance from the Robotron Needletron. Zoey tries to promote the bikes, but to no success. After a pep talk, she decides to make them look cool. When Blaze returns to steal more Morph-X, the Rangers transform to engage him, avatar Roxy, and Needletron, defeating the monster and the Gigadrone Scrozzle deploys. After the battle, Zoey learns that Mayor Daniels called off the highway project, having been amazed by a viral video of the Rangers trying to stop Blaze while riding the Morph-X bikes.
4	4	"Digital Deception"	Oliver Driver	Story by : Becca Barnes & Alwyn Dale; Teleplay by : Denise Downer	March 30, 2019	0.71
On Valentine's Day, Cybervillain Roxy creates Shoveltron to terrorize the city while she attempts to get closer to Ravi by pretending to retain her human template's feelings for him. Spurred on by the avatar apparently saving him, Ravi starts to believe there is good inside her and asks for Nate's help to make her good again. Meeting Roxy at a park, the avatar ensnares the blue Ranger and attempts to turn him into an evil avatar, only for Devon and Zoey to break him out. Devon goes in his Zord to defeat a Gigadrone sent to attack the city while Ravi and Zoey destroy Shoveltron. Afterwards, Ravi apologizes to his allies and thanks them for their aid as everyone continues their Valentine's Day celebrations.
5	5	"Taking Care of Business"	Oliver Driver	Alwyn Dale and Becca Barnes	April 6, 2019	0.59
Devon tries to get a job at a car wash on his father's instructions. Meanwhile, Nate asks the Rangers to collect Gigadrone debris for study, inspired by siblings Ben and Betty Burke’s latest invention, but Devon is torn between helping his Ranger allies and fulfilling his father's desires. Elsewhere, Cybervillain Blaze creates Slicertron to steal Morph-X from the city's tower, forcing Ravi and Zoey to head out and drive it off. The two later join Devon, but the robot steals Morph-X from the tower, forcing all three to engage it again. Devon deploys his Zord to engage and incapacitate an arriving Gigadrone while Ravi and Zoey destroy the Robotron. Afterwards, despite being fired from his car washing job, Devon holds out hope that his father will know the truth and be proud of him.
6	6	"Hangar Heist"	Riccardo Pellizzeri	Becca Barnes and Alwyn Dale	April 13, 2019	0.59
While Nate hopes to develop new technology from the Gigadrone that Devon captured, simulation failures for a new Zord configuration are diagnosed as Devon struggles with fully trusting his team, which Commander Shaw calls him out for. Meanwhile, Evox's forces initiate their plan to recapture the stolen Gigadrone and create Meltatron to break into Grid Battleforce's hangar. Responding to the break-in, the Rangers morph to engage the intruders, but Roxy reactivates the Gigadrone and traps Zoey and Ravi in the hangar. While Scrozzle secretly steals Grid Battleforce technology, Devon escapes in his Zord, confronts another arriving Gigadrone, and breaks his comrades out just as they defeat the Robotron. Deploying their own Zords, the three Rangers successfully combine them into the Beast-X Megazord to destroy both giant robots. Afterwards, Devon apologizes to his comrades for not listening to them and resolves to be more open to advice.
7	7	"A Friend Indeed"	Oliver Driver	Chip Lynn	April 20, 2019	0.57
As the Ranger team have a falling out with their Beast Bots, Evox's forces target the latter group to steal their memory data to prevent the Rangers from forming their Megazord, with the Robotron Railtron stealing all but Jax's data. Following this setback, Nate determines the villains' plan and a method to try to fix Cruise and Smash while Zoey falls out with Jax until he reveals he and the other two were intending to hold a party for the Rangers. When Railtron attacks, the Rangers transform to engage the robot, reclaim Cruise and Smash's memory data with Jax’s help, and destroy the foe. Once everyone reconciles with their companion Beast Bots, the team destroys a Gigadrone and two Gigatronics deployed to attack the city. Afterwards, the Beast Bots hold their promised party to celebrate their companions while Scrozzle reveals his latest invention to the avatars.
8	8	"The Cybergate Opens"	Riccardo Pellizzeri	Becca Barnes and Alwyn Dale	April 27, 2019	0.61
Scrozzle builds a cybergate to free Evox from the Cyber Dimension, but requires a robot body to house the virus. Using their templates' memories, Blaze and Roxy kidnap Nate and force him to help them. However, he secretly subverts the plan using the mantis and scarab beetle DNA he recently collected to turn himself into the Gold Ranger and inadvertently turn the robot he was forced to create into the Silver Ranger. With the original three Rangers' help, Nate and the robot destroy the cybergate and foil Evox's plans. Following the battle, the Rangers name the robot Steel and discover he is half-human as Nate's DNA was incorporated into him when he became a Ranger.
9	9	"Silver Sacrifice"	Riccardo Pellizzeri	Alwyn Dale and Becca Barnes	September 14, 2019	0.58
While rebuilding the cybergate, Evox tasks his minions with kidnapping Steel and resuming their previous plan. Meanwhile, Grid Battleforce learns of Evox's plan, but Ben and Betty's father, General Burke, refuses to accept Steel as a Ranger and orders him to be deactivated to stop Evox. After the general's children get captured however, Steel willingly sacrifices himself, changing the former's mind. As the Rangers fight to save their friend, Evox attempts to take control of Steel, only to learn he is incompatible with the latter's human DNA. After Steel destroys the cybergate once more, Scrozzle sends a Gigadrone to destroy the Rangers in retaliation. Seeing this, Commander Shaw deploys the newly built Wrecker and Jet Zords so Nate and Steel could defeat the Gigadrone’s Gigatronics while Devon destroys the Gigadrone itself. Afterwards, Grid Battleforce collects the cybergate's remains to prevent Evox's forces from using them again and General Burke apologizes to Steel.
10	10	"Thrills And Drills"	Oliver Driver	Becca Barnes and Alwyn Dale	September 21, 2019	0.61
As Evox's forces plan to steal data from the Rangers, Ravi suffers from a toothache, but is unwilling to head to the dentist due to his fear of drills. This fear incapacitates the Blue Ranger when Avatar Roxy and Drilltron attack. The Rangers then search for the enemies, with Ravi, Nate, and Steel finding them underground under a Morph-X tower. As the three engage Drilltron and Roxy, Devon and Zoey are deployed in their Zords to engage an arriving Gigadrone, which overwhelms them. Ravi destroys the Robotron, but Roxy secretly makes off with his Ranger data as the Ranger team forms the Beast-X Megazord to destroy the Gigadrone. Afterwards, inspired by Nate overcoming his fear of spiders during their mission, Ravi finishes his dental appointment while Evox's forces continue their current plan.
11	11	"Tools of the Betrayed"	Oliver Driver	Story by : Alwyn Dale & Becca Barnes; Teleplay by : Johnny Hartmann	September 28, 2019	0.55
The Rangers engage Evox's forces, with Devon destroying Blaze's Robotron maker and forcing the enemy to retreat. As Nate develops an early warning system for Gigadrones, Ben and Betty accidentally break Devon's newly delivered VR set and Zoey lies to him to cover the siblings, leading to a break in trust between the two Rangers once the truth is revealed. Meanwhile, Roxy creates Tooltron, intending to collect the Rangers' data, and incapacitates Zoey's equipment. The rest of the Rangers engage in battle and destroy the Robotron, but Roxy and Scrozzle secretly leave with the data on Zoey's Ranger power in hand as the team confronts a Gigadrone that deploys another giant robot. In response, Nate and Steel combine the Wrecker and Jet Zords to form the Striker Megazord and destroy both robots. Afterwards, Devon and Zoey reconcile and he receives a fixed VR set.
12	12	"Real Steel"	Riccardo Pellizzeri	Chip Lynn	October 5, 2019	0.50
As Nate and Steel unexpectedly clash over basketball, Blaze creates a Robotron called Clonetron, who is capable of becoming anyone, to infiltrate Grid Battleforce and cripple the Rangers' systems, with the robot disguising himself as Nate. After a lecture from Commander Shaw, the imposter Nate connects with Steel. Steel later discovers the Robotron's plot and Nate's inability to learn basketball and reconciles with the real Nate, but Clonetron destroys Grid Battleforce's computers, forcing the brothers to stay behind to fix it. The remaining Rangers transform to engage the Robotron, but are unable to fight an arriving Gigadrone until Nate restores the Zord deployment system, allowing Devon to destroy the giant robot while Ravi and Zoey destroy Clonetron. Afterwards, Nate and Steel reconcile and win a new basketball game.
13	13	"Tuba Triumph"	Riccardo Pellizzeri	Story by : Alwyn Dale & Becca Barnes; Teleplay by : Johnny Hartmann	October 12, 2019	0.54
After boy named Joey gets bullied for playing a tuba and throws it away, Ravi accompanies him while reflecting on the fact that his mother refuses to allow him any hobbies. Meanwhile, Roxy uses the tuba to create Tubatron, who can produce deafening sound blasts, intending to get data on Devon's cheetah speed before she and the robot engage the Rangers and escape. Ravi teaches Joey some karate moves and presents a new tuba to him, advising the lad to stand up for himself. The Rangers are later deployed when the boy plays his tuba, and run into an upgraded Tubatron. The robot overpowers the team until Joey counterattacks with his new tuba, allowing the Rangers to destroy the foe while Devon unwittingly foils Roxy's plan when he unknowingly blasts the enemy's data chip. The Rangers then engage an arriving Gigadrone, countering its sonic blast with a recording of Joey’s tuba sounds before destroying it. Afterwards, Joey stands up to his bullies and bonds with Ravi.
14	14	"Hypnotic Halloween"	Oliver Driver	Story by : Maiya Thompson, Becca Barnes & Alwyn Dale; Teleplay by : Maiya Thompson, James Collins & Cameron Dixon	October 19, 2019	0.53
Ravi, Steel, Nate, and Zoey intend to celebrate Halloween by watching horror movies. However, the four are hypnotized by Nate's chosen movie, which was a trap set by Scrozzle, causing them to act like the costumes they are wearing. Devon, arriving at the scene, discovers the fiasco and snaps them out of their hypnotized state by dressing up and acting in a related costume. Afterwards, the Rangers are alerted of a Robotron breaking into a Morph-X tower. The team transform to engage the foe, during which Scrozzle deploys a Gigadrone. Devon, Zoey, and Ravi fight the Gigadrone in their Zords, but are overpowered by the giant robot and its accompanying Delta Model Gigadrone until Steel and Nate destroy the Robotron and join them in defeating the two giant enemies. Afterwards, Devon joins his friends as they all resume their horror movie party.
15	15	"Sound and Fury"	Riccardo Pellizzeri	Becca Barnes and Alwyn Dale	October 26, 2019	0.46
Scrozzle relates his history to Evox's forces along with his Fury Cells, prompting Blaze to use one to greatly enhance the destructive power of his new Robotron Tubatron 2.0 to destroy the Rangers. Meanwhile, Megan, a technician at Grid Battleforce, covets Nate's position and attempts to blackmail him and Zoey by sabotaging their new weapon. The Rangers are deployed to fight Tubatron 2.0, but are overpowered by the robot's enhanced powers. They manage to capture a Fury Cell and incorporate it into a new form for Devon so he can defeat the Robotron. Back at Grid Battleforce, Megan's actions are discovered by Commander Shaw, who fires her while Nate develops a Red Fury Mode for Devon using a Fury Cell he stole from Blaze. Using his new powers, Devon destroys the Robotron along with an arriving Gigadrone. Afterwards, the team struggles to determine if Nate and Zoey are dating.
16	16	"Seeing Red"	Oliver Driver	Alwyn Dale and Becca Barnes	November 2, 2019	0.63
Devon becomes hooked on his new Red Fury Mode powers, even using them to stop a bank robber. However, he keeps burning through them, forcing him to steal the remaining ones from Blaze and Roxy. Unbeknownst to him, the Cells have unexpected side effects as the technology slowly corrupts him. Meanwhile, Evox's forces plan to make Devon permanently evil by taking advantage of his addiction. The Rangers head off to engage Roxy and her Robotron, Burnertron, while trying to reason with Devon. Realizing his errant ways, Devon powers down, destroys the last Fury Cell, and leads his team in destroying the Robotron and a Gigadrone attacking the city. Unbeknownst to them, Roxy leaves with data on Devon’s Ranger power, only to clash with her allies. Later that day, Devon apologizes to his team and everyone celebrates General Burke's birthday.
17	17	"Gorilla Art"	Oliver Driver	Story by : Alwyn Dale & Becca Barnes; Teleplay by : Johnny Hartmann	November 9, 2019	0.52
Smash discovers Ravi's secret painting hobby, causing Ravi to hastily delete part of his memory. Meanwhile, Scrozzle's early creation, Vargoyle, who was corrupted by Fury Cells and left his master, finds Scrozzle and becomes part of Evox's army, with Evox offering to reward him after he fights the Ranger team. Back at Grid Battleforce, the Rangers discover Ravi's painting hobby and Smash with an itch to paint. Ravi admits to his actions and how his mother disallows him to paint, believing it to be a distraction from his Ranger duties. As Vargoyle and a Gigadrone attack the city, Nate remains behind to fix Smash while the Rangers destroy the Gigadrone. However, Steel struggles against Vargoyle, forcing Nate to bail him out. Afterwards, Ravi and Smash reconcile, with Smash revealing he did not tell Commander Shaw while Vargoyle is rewarded with data on the Rangers as Blaze and Roxy angrily conspire to eliminate him.
18	18	"Ranger Reveal"	Oliver Driver	Story by : Becca Barnes & Alwyn Dale; Teleplay by : Denise Downer	November 16, 2019	0.49
Movie star Nikki Rev comes to town while Vargoyle attacks the city. The Rangers are deployed to engage the foe, but Vargoyle overpowers them and they discover a camera had captured their fight and reversion, which Zoey's mother, Muriel Reeves, finds and intends to reveal on national TV. Zoey attempts to plead with Muriel not to, but the latter is adamant. As the Rangers go on guard duty to protect Nikki, the Robotron Shockatron and a Gigadrone attack the city, forcing the Rangers to engage and defeat the enemies. Afterwards, Nikki explains her situation and Zoey's mother announces she will not reveal the footage of the Rangers. However, unbeknownst to the Rangers, the earlier battle allowed Vargoyle to plant Scrozzle's Memory Pulsator on the news tower unhindered.
19	19	"Rewriting History"	Simon Bennett	Story by : Alwyn Dale & Becca Barnes; Teleplay by : Johnny Hartmann	November 23, 2019	0.50
As the Rangers relax, Evox's forces mobilize to activate the Memory Pulsator, which erases everyone's memories of Evox's attacks. Steel, the only one unaffected by the Pulsator, tries to help his comrades regain their memories, but to no avail. Meanwhile, Blaze and Roxy take advantage of the Pulsator's effects to infiltrate Grid Battleforce as their templates, steal three teleportion devices, and infect the real Roxy's stasis pod. When Vargoyle attacks, Steel convinces Devon to help him engage the enemy. During the fight, Vargoyle reveals the Pulsator's location. When the duo reach the news tower where the Pulsator is fixed, Devon engages Vargoyle in a duel and destroys him after Blaze and Roxy convince Scrozzle not to help Vargoyle while Steel climbs the tower and destroys the Pulsator, restoring everyone's memories despite being critically damaged and shutting down. The Rangers assemble to destroy an invading Gigadrone before Nate fixes and reboots Steel, who is congratulated for his valor.
20	20	"Target: Tower"	Simon Bennett	Story by : Becca Barnes & Alwyn Dale; Teleplay by : Johnny Hartmann	November 30, 2019	0.49
Evox and his minions begin to execute their final plan of stealing an entire Morph-X tower. In response, the Rangers are called in to protect a series of teleporters from Evox's minions. During the mission, Ravi defies his mother's orders in a desperate bid to save the real Roxy by destroying her avatar once and for all, but inadvertently allows Blaze to claim the stolen teleporters and activate them, resulting in both the Morph-X tower and Devon being transported to the Cyber Dimension. Meanwhile, Mayor Daniels witnesses the catastrophe, discovering his son's secret in the process. Back at Grid Battleforce, the remaining Rangers discuss the situation when the real Roxy awakens and reveals Evox's plan.
21	21	"Evox: Upgraded"	Simon Bennett	Story by : Becca Barnes & Alwyn Dale; Teleplay by : Johnny Hartmann	December 7, 2019	0.47
Confronting the Commander about his recent discovery, Mayor Daniels is told the truth about the Rangers' true identities and joins them in their mission to travel into the Cyber Dimension to save Devon and defeat Evox. As Evox slowly assumes a physical form and prepares to return to Earth, Zoey decides that they need a new Megazord combination for the situation, so Nate and Steel reveal their secret configuration: the Beast-X Ultrazord. The Rangers and Mayor Daniels venture into the Cyber Dimension, during which the mayor rescues and reconciles with his son. However, everyone struggles against Evox, who has gained his physical form and disassembles the Ultrazord. While Nate thwarts Evox's plan and Scrozzle escapes, Devon attempts to destroy the Morph-X tower from inside with his still-intact Zord but is ambushed by Blaze, who confronts him in his own Megazord. After a swift battle, Devon destroys the avatar and his Megazord before doing the same with the tower, during which the real Blaze finally awakens. Everyone escapes the Cyber Dimension, but as Grid Battleforce celebrates their victory, Mayor Daniels notices a purple glow on his body.
22	22	"Scrozzle's Revenge"	Oliver Driver	Story by : Alwyn Dale & Becca Barnes; Teleplay by : James Collins, Cameron Dixon & Maiya Thompson	December 14, 2019	0.45
As the Rangers and their Beast Bots prepare to celebrate Christmas, they are suddenly alerted of a Robotron attacking the city. Arriving at the scene, the Rangers transform to engage the foe, only for Scrozzle to trap Nate, Zoey, and Devon in Christmas ornaments. Steel takes Scrozzle's Christmas tree and volunteers to free the humans from their imprisonment but inadvertently traps Ravi in an ornament too. However, Scrozzle attacks Coral Harbor with a piloted Gigadrone. The Beast Bots respond by piloting the Zords themselves to confront Scrozzle and evacuate the city's populace while Cruise defeats the Robotron. Afterwards, Steel frees his fellow Rangers and everyone is visited by Santa Claus.

=== Season 2 (2020) ===
No. overall	No. in season	Title	Directed by	Written by	Original release date	U.S. viewers (millions)
23	1	"Believe It or Not"	Oliver Driver	Becca Barnes & Alwyn Dale	February 22, 2020	0.39
Mayor Daniels has been leading a global campaign to introduce Morph-X as a new fuel for the planet and everything has been quiet. However, Steel finds evidence that proves Evox may have returned, but the other Rangers struggle to believe whether he has created a conspiracy or not and brush him off. A trip to the woods eventually proves Steel right, as the Rangers discover Scrozzle and a new Drilltron stealing Morph-X from underground. The Rangers engage the enemy, during which they learn that Scrozzle was siphoning Morph-X from a leak. A Gigadrone, accompanied by Gigatronics, are sent to finish the job, but the Rangers call in their Zords to defeat them. Afterwards, Devon and his allies apologize to Steel for not believing him.
24	2	"Save Our Shores"	Simon Bennett	Alwyn Dale & Becca Barnes	February 29, 2020	0.46
A shipping accident creates an environmental hazard when trash washes into a coral reef, posing a serious threat to all the marine wildlife there. Roxy asks her aunt, the head of the shipping company responsible, to help by providing funds to a rescue center. Along the way, she and Blaze get trapped by a Robotron for Scrozzle, who scans them for their DNA while the Rangers destroy the Robotron. Scrozzle returns to his new base in the Crystal Dimension, where he meets up with the returned Evox and uses the DNA scan to bring back the evil Blaze and Roxy avatars as robots through his Robot-Maker. The Rangers are deployed to engage the two robot generals and their forces, resulting in a grueling battle which ends with the Rangers destroying the robots before destroying a Gigadrone sent after a Morph-X tower. Afterwards, they join the human Blaze and Roxy to see a recovering turtle off, during which they reveal to the pair the existence of their robotic counterparts. Meanwhile, Scrozzle rebuilds the two robots from fresh templates using his Robot-Maker.
25	3	"Game On!"	Oliver Driver	Story by : Becca Barnes & Alwyn Dale; Teleplay by : Johnny Hartmann	March 7, 2020	0.46
Devon makes it to the finals of a new video game championship, but is baffled when his controller mysteriously malfunctions and his opponent Kerry nearly wins. Suddenly, Robo-Blaze and Robo-Roxy appear and steal Kerry's controller to create a new Robotron capable of creating evil clones of the Rangers. Devon becomes even more conflicted when Kerry approaches the Rangers and reveals the controller has a bug that carried over to the Robotron; a bug she used to cheat. When Devon and his team are deployed to confront the Robotron again, they use the bug to incapacitate their clones before defeating them and the Robotron. Returning to the championship, Devon emerges the victor in the finals, but gives his prize to Kerry for playing fair. Meanwhile, Evox is revealed to have secretly taken over Mayor Daniels.
26	4	"Artist Anonymous"	Simon Bennett	Story by : Alwyn Dale & Becca Barnes; Teleplay by : Johnny Hartmann	March 14, 2020	0.50
The entire city is enraptured by a stunning mural painted by a mystery artist, who the other Rangers realize is Ravi. However, he refuses to reveal himself as he is still hiding his passion from his mother, Commander Shaw. Nate insists that Ravi should tell the truth and get it over with, but before he can, someone else takes credit for it and the next mural they paint will be on the walls of Grid Battleforce. They eventually discover the painter is a disguised Robotron and, with Commander Shaw's help, destroy it before it can infiltrate Grid Battleforce. Following the battle, Ravi reveals his secret to her. While she is disappointed by his dishonesty, she is ultimately happy with her son.
27	5	"Cruisin' for a Bruisin'"	Simon Bennett	Story by : Becca Barnes & Alwyn Dale; Teleplay by : Denise Downer	March 28, 2020	0.34
Amidst target practice, Cruise outperforms the Rangers, inspiring Devon to have him help in battle, much to Nate and the others' concerns. When the Rangers are deployed to engage another Robotron, Digitron, Cruise ends up being absorbed by the robot. Wanting to save his friend, Devon gets the idea to have the Rangers combine with their Beast Bots to create a new, upgraded form, but he needs to rescue his friend first. Nate prepares the equipment following Devon's idea when Digitron returns. The Rangers are sent out to confront it, and transform into their new Beast-X modes after Devon rescues Cruise. With their new form, they defeat the Robotron. Afterwards, Devon and Cruise reconcile and everyone celebrate their latest victory.
28	6	"The Blame Game"	Oliver Driver	Story by : Alwyn Dale & Becca Barnes; Teleplay by : Johnny Hartmann	April 4, 2020	0.40
Steel learns the concept of discipline from the Rangers and decides to practice it around the city. However, his reprimands begin to grow out of hand. Meanwhile, Scrozzle deploys Controlatron to capture Nate, with the robot controlling a Grid Battleforce employee through a hand puppet in the process. The Rangers transform to engage the enemy, but are overpowered by a mind-controlled Nate before the Robotron brings him back to program a malware for Evox. Back at Grid Battleforce, the employee is fired following Steel's accusations when two Gigadrones attack the city. Returning to battle, Devon frees Nate from Controlatron's hypnotism, destroys the robot, and defeats both Gigadrones. Afterwards, Steel apologizes to everyone and the employee is hired back into the organization after it was revealed that he was brainwashed into bringing the puppet that infected Nate.
29	7	"Beast King Rampage"	Oliver Driver	Story by : Becca Barnes & Alwyn Dale; Teleplay by : Tom Furniss	April 11, 2020	0.37
General Burke reveals the new Beast-X King Zord to the Rangers along with former Grid Battleforce employee Megan's involvement in it, much to everyone's disgust and skepticism. During a test-run however, Evox's forces use the malware Nate was brainwashed into making to infect the Zord with a virus, forcing the Rangers to scramble to regain control of it. In the midst of this, Megan attempts to atone for trying to steal Nate's job, but the Rangers brush her off until they realize they need her technical expertise. Following her advice, Nate develops a new prototype weapon and uses it to subdue the King Zord, allowing Devon to pilot it and defeat Robo-Blaze's Megazord while the other Rangers overpower Robo-Roxy. Afterwards, Burke apologizes to everyone and Commander Shaw rehires Megan.
30	8	"Boxed In"	Oliver Driver	Story by : Becca Barnes & Alwyn Dale; Teleplay by : Cameron Dixon, Maiya Thompson & James Collins	April 18, 2020	0.42
The Pan Global Games have arrived in Coral Harbor, but their duties prevent the Rangers from attending any of the events. When Devon, Zoey, and Nate are selected to carry out some observations, they encounter Dumbbelltron and engage him, but are beaten back until Steel and Ravi assist them in defeating the Robotron. Scrozzle then deploys a Gigadrone to attack Coral Harbor, so Devon engages it in the Racer Zord. When Devon gets captured, he is forced to fight four Gigadrones while his comrades struggle to free him. Nate works on a new Megazord program, allowing the remaining Rangers to rescue Devon and defeat the giant Robotron and the Gigadrones. Afterwards, the Rangers decide to carry out their routine check together before heading off to see the Karate finals.
31	9	"Secret Struggle"	Oliver Driver	Story by : Alwyn Dale & Becca Barnes; Teleplay by : Johnny Hartmann	April 25, 2020	0.41
Steel learns that Nate and Zoey have feelings for each other and tries to bring them together despite Grid Battleforce prohibiting relationships between Rangers. Meanwhile, the Rangers stop Robo-Roxy from apparently kidnapping Mayor Daniels and give him a 24/7 protection detail, with Steel nominating Zoey and Nate for the task. Amidst their duties, Steel unsuccessfully attempts to get Nate and Zoey closer and incurs Commander Shaw's ire. Ravi and Zoey are sent to monitor Mayor Daniels, but are overpowered by Robo-Roxy and Tiaratron until Nate and Steel arrive to help them defeat the robots while Devon destroys a Gigadrone sent to attack the city. Afterwards, Nate and Zoey assert their relationship and Commander Shaw rescinds the no-dating rule. However, everyone discovers that Evox has infected and possessed the mayor.
32	10	"The Evox Snare"	Simon Bennett	Story by : Becca Barnes, Alwyn Dale & Chip Lynn; Teleplay by : Chip Lynn	September 19, 2020 (Note: This episode was first released on June 11, 2020 in the UK.)	0.30
Following the revelation that Evox has possessed Mayor Daniels, Grid Battleforce shuts down the Morph-X Towers in order to lure Evox into a trap. Meanwhile, Nate finds a way to imprison Evox/Mayor Daniels until they are able to find a safe way to separate them. However, Devon does not agree with this idea and attempts to find a better way to accomplish the task by searching through Ranger history. He makes contact with Doctor K, who makes mention of the Dino Charge Rangers' Split Emitters. Meanwhile, the rest of the Rangers confront Scrozzle, Robo-Blaze, Robo-Roxy, and their forces as part of their plan to lure Evox. They later confront Evox when he arrives at a Morph-X tower before using their own Split Emitters to separate him from Mayor Daniels. Following their victory, Grid Battleforce reactivates the Morph-X towers and Devon reunites with his father.
33	11	"Intruder Alert!"	Simon Bennett	Story by : Alwyn Dale & Becca Barnes; Teleplay by : Johnny Hartmann	September 26, 2020 (Note: This episode was first released on June 12, 2020 in the UK.)	0.33
As the Rangers receive a strange message from outer space warning of an impending threat, an alien criminal named Ryjack allies with Evox to steal gear from Grid Battleforce's Ranger Vault. As a result, the Rangers struggle against Ryjack accompanied by a revived Vargoyle along with another alien trespassing into Grid Battleforce's facilities. After Ravi and Zoey get injured by Ryjack, Devon and Steel rejuvenate the exhausted alien, Captain Chaku, who explains his mission to them and treats the wounded. Later, he and Devon confront and destroy Vargoyle while Nate and Steel destroy a Gigadrone attempting to steal Morph-X. Afterwards, Ravi and Zoey show signs of recovery and everyone socializes with Chaku.
34	12	"The Greater Good"	Simon Bennett	Story by : Becca Barnes & Alwyn Dale; Teleplay by : Johnny Hartmann	October 3, 2020 (Note: This episode was first released on June 15, 2020 in the UK.)	0.28
The Rangers learn more about Chaku while Ryjack initiates his plan to tunnel his way into the Ranger Vault and steal its contents. Nate overhears a call from the captain's daughter, when Ryjack attacks Grid Battleforce, only to be driven out by Chaku and the Rangers. Taking Chaku aside, he learns that the alien was made into a cyborg as part of his job. The Rangers and Chaku are deployed when Ryjack is spotted again, with Chaku depriving him of his main weapon, the Reanimizer. In response, Ryjack enlarges, forcing the Rangers and Chaku to summon their mechs to destroy him while Scrozzle steals the discarded Reanimizer. Afterwards, the Rangers use Morph-X to turn Chaku back into a human and send him off back to his daughter.
35	13	"Finders Keepers"	Oliver Driver	Story by : Alwyn Dale & Becca Barnes; Teleplay by : Denise Downer	October 10, 2020 (Note: This episode was first released on June 16, 2020 in the UK.)	0.32
As the Rangers search Ryjack's ship, Zoey accidentally captures Keeper after mistaking him for a foe, before Evox's forces revives Snide and kidnaps Keeper. The Beast Morpher Rangers, along with the Dino Charge Rangers, discuss the situation until Evox sends a message to them demanding a ransom for Keeper. When the enemy force refuses to return Keeper despite being given the ransom, the Dino Charge Rangers engage Snide while the Beast Morpher Rangers engage and destroy a Gigadrone. Meanwhile, Scrozzle uses the Reanimizer to revive Sledge and his crew to fight the Dino Charge team, but the Grid Battleforce Rangers rescue Keeper. Afterwards, Zoey apologizes to Keeper and Commander Shaw debriefs the Rangers on the situation.
36	14	"Making Bad"	Simon Bennett	Story by : Alwyn Dale & Becca Barnes; Teleplay by : Maiya Thompson, James Collins & Cameron Dixon	October 17, 2020 (Note: This episode was first released on June 17, 2020 in the UK.)	0.49
When Scrozzle reveals Ryjack's Reanimizer can revive enemies of the past Power Rangers, Evox tasks his minions and Sledge's crew to decide which villain to resurrect while Scrozzle sends Thieftron to steal diamonds to fuel the Reanimizer. Meanwhile, the Rangers learn of Thieftron's crime spree and head out to engage and defeat the Robotron. In response, Sledge's crew is sent to steal diamonds instead, only to be killed by the Rangers. Evox nominates Goldar to be revived. As such, Goldar is resurrected as Goldar Maximus and kills Sledge on Evox's orders after the bounty hunter insults him. Back at Grid Battleforce, the Rangers struggle to determine why Evox's forces needed diamonds.
37	15	"Grid Connection"	Oliver Driver	Story by : Becca Barnes, Alwyn Dale & Chip Lynn; Teleplay by : Chip Lynn	October 24, 2020 (Note: This episode was first released on June 18, 2020 in the UK.)	0.34
Devon becomes dismissive when Keeper reveals a vision concerning the Rangers while Evox's forces strike. In response to Tyler's call for help, the remaining Beast Morpher Rangers head out to engage the foe, only for the enemy army to overpower them. Devon returns to be briefed on the others' situation and apologize to Keeper for his skepticism. Deciding to save his friends, Devon uses a Morph-X tower and a fragment from a meteorite he encountered earlier to call for help, with Jason Lee Scott arriving shortly after. Jason and Devon arrive to assist their comrades with Jason summoning his team and the Dino Thunder Rangers to defeat their foes. When Evox confronts them in a Zord he built, the Rangers summon their Zords to engage and defeat him. Afterwards, everyone return to their home dimensions and Devon thanks Keeper for his wisdom. Guest Stars: Austin St. John, Brennan Mejia, Yoshi Sudarso, James Davies, Davi Santos.
38	16	"Golden Opportunity"	Oliver Driver	Story by : Alywn Dale & Becca Barnes; Teleplay by : Chip Lynn	October 31, 2020 (Note: This episode was first released on June 19, 2020 in the UK.)	0.26
Nate is reunited with his parents after a long time, but is torn between fulfilling his duties as a Grid Battleforce member and leaving with his parents when he discovers they are heading off again. When Nate's friends reassure him and offer to handle his duties while he is gone, Robo-Roxy attacks them all and steals Nate's DNA scanner. Using the scanner's collected DNA of a beetle and a flower, Robo-Roxy creates Clawtron and upgrades herself respectively to remain useful to Evox before launching an assault on the city accompanied by Clawtron. The remaining Rangers attempt to engage the robots but are overpowered until Nate arrives to assist them in destroying Clawtron and an arriving Gigadrone attacking the city, while driving Robo-Roxy away. Afterwards, everyone sees Nate's worth in protecting Coral Harbor and Nate himself asserts to his parents his decision to stay with his Ranger comrades as he bids them farewell.
39	17	"Goin' Ape"	Oliver Driver	Story by : Becca Barnes & Alwyn Dale; Teleplay by : Johnny Hartmann	November 7, 2020 (Note: This episode was first released on June 22, 2020 in the UK.)	0.28
Ravi and Roxy's anniversary goes sideways when he forgets to bring his gift to her. When Smash tries to calm Ravi down, Robo-Roxy attacks them both. The duo engage the enemy, but are overpowered until their comrades arrive to cool an overheated Ravi down and drive Robo-Roxy away. While the others try to figure out the misunderstanding between Roxy and Ravi, Ben and Betty bring in an old lady who reveals she was arranging a meet-up with Ravi to return his forgotten anniversary gift. Meanwhile, Robo-Roxy and Robo-Blaze attack Ravi, who is overpowered and still overheated until the other Rangers arrive to take on the robots and their forces, with Ravi defeating Robo-Roxy before the others take him away to cool him down. Afterwards, Roxy and Ravi reconcile and Ravi presents his gift to her.
40	18	"The Silva Switch"	Oliver Driver	Alwyn Dale & Becca Barnes	November 14, 2020 (Note: This episode was first released on June 23, 2020 in the UK.)	0.30
When Nate tries to make Steel a human, both brothers accidentally swap bodies due to an accident. When the Rangers are deployed to fight Robo-Blaze and an accompanying Antennatron 2.0, Nate struggles with his new body while Steel revels in being a human amidst warnings of molecular decay from remaining in another body for too long. Meanwhile, Evox's forces scuffle with one another to gain Evox's favor, with Robo-Blaze siphoning Morph-X from Evox's stash to enhance himself. Despite the Rangers' interference and efforts, he manages to steal more Morph-X from Grid Battleforce after destroying his accomplice, leaving the Rangers to destroy an arriving Gigadrone. Afterwards, the Rangers swap Nate and Steel back to their respective bodies while Evox congratulates Robo-Blaze for his achievements, much to Robo-Roxy's anger and suspicion.
41	19	"Fossil Frenzy"	Oliver Driver	Becca Barnes & Alwyn Dale	November 21, 2020 (Note: This episode was first released on June 24, 2020 in the UK.)	0.26
Zoey's older brother Mike visits her, announcing that he found a fossilized claw to help in his scholarship interview, only for Zoey to unintentionally destroy it in a lab accident. Eager to make up for the mistake, she ventures out solo to find the fossil's location, where she obtains another fossilized sample and is confronted by Robo-Roxy. Concerned for her safety, the other Rangers hurry to Zoey's aid and drive Robo-Roxy off. Using the fossil's DNA, Robo-Roxy enhances herself again to maintain her usefulness to Evox, overloading and destroying their Robot-Maker in the process. When Robo-Roxy attacks the city, the Rangers are deployed to engage her, only to struggle against her new form. The robotic general enlarges herself, forcing the team to deploy their Zords to engage and destroy her permanently. Later that day, Devon reveals what he learned from Scrozzle's lecture to Robo-Blaze after the battle and Mike gains his scholarship.
42	20	"Crunch Time"	Simon Bennett	Story by : Becca Barnes & Alwyn Dale; Teleplay by : Johnny Hartmann	November 28, 2020 (Note: This episode was first released on June 25, 2020 in the UK.)	0.23
The Rangers receive a memory drive from Blaze and learn of Evox's new scheme just as a Robotron is spotted. The team is deployed to defeat Railtron 2.0 with Blaze's help, but Devon arrives late and grows stricter with his team. Blaze continues to give Devon bad advice while Evox deploys in a Gigadrone to fight the Rangers. Deploying in their Zords, the team engages Evox, whose Gigadrone overloads and explodes, damaging Cruise in the process. Horrified by Cruise's injuries, Devon leads his team in subduing and capturing Evox. Afterwards, Devon apologizes to everyone, though Blaze takes credit for the plan. The team drives "Blaze" out upon learning the truth from his real counterpart and struggle to determine Evox's true plan.
43	21	"Source Code"	Simon Bennett	Story by : Alwyn Dale & Becca Barnes; Teleplay by : Chip Lynn	December 5, 2020 (Note: This episode was first released on June 26, 2020 in the UK.)	0.25
Evox breaks out of his prison and works his way through Grid Battleforce's computers to access the Ranger Vault, where he takes a Cell Shift morpher to download his original codes. When the Rangers confront him, he reveals that Nate once experimented with Morph-X and snake DNA on the morpher that he was hiding in, which released him into the organization's systems. Evox also reveals himself as Venjix, who was the enemy of the RPM Rangers, before overpowering the Rangers and escaping. Shocked by the revelation, a guilt-ridden Nate struggles to form a plan against the virus. However, his comrades call in Doctor K, Venjix's creator, to assist Nate while they are deployed to fight Robo-Blaze. Nate and Doctor K work on an antivirus arrow, with the former joining the battle to experiment it on Robo-Blaze, destroying him permanently. However, Scrozzle and Evox successfully take over the Morph-X tower system during the battle.
44	22	"Evox Unleashed"	Simon Bennett	Story by : Alwyn Dale & Becca Barnes; Teleplay by : Johnny Hartmann	December 12, 2020 (Note: This episode was first released on June 26, 2020 on the UK POP App in the UK, and first released on June 29, 2020 in the UK.)	0.19
As Coral Harbor is evacuated, Zoey, with permission from Commander Shaw, reveals her identity to her mother. The Rangers then confront Evox using weapons from the Ranger Vault. However, he brushes off Nate's second antivirus arrow and proceeds to a hijacked tower to absorb all the Morph-X therein. Steel tries to stop him, but Evox kills him, forcing his allies to retreat. The remaining Rangers warn Grid Battleforce's staff of the danger, but they all choose to stay and help them, restoring their morale. The four Rangers are deployed to confront the now-gigantic Evox, who has merged with the Morph-X Tower, in the Beast-X King Ultrazord, only for their foe to overpower them. Realizing that Evox is vulnerable to human DNA, the Rangers induce large amounts of their own DNA into Evox/Venjix’s base code, corrupting it and destroying their enemy once and for all. Following this victory, the Morphin' Grid revives Steel as a human. One year later, Coral Harbor has turned to solar and wind energy for power. Ben and Betty, with assistance from Colonel Mason Truman, capture Scrozzle. The Rangers, Beast Bots, Ben, and Betty later celebrate Steel's first birthday.

== Production ==
Saban Brands announced on February 12, 2018, that it had renewed its partnership with Nickelodeon for an additional three years now going until 2021. In a joint statement on February 15, 2018, Saban announced that it would not renew its master toy license with Bandai going forward and that the current license would expire on April 1, 2019, ending a 25-year partnership dating back to 1993 with Mighty Morphin Power Rangers. The following day on February 16, 2018, at New York Toy Fair 2018, Hasbro announced that it had acquired the master toy license from Saban Brands, revealed a re-branded logo for the Power Rangers franchise and mentioned that their contract with Saban Brands included an option to negotiate the purchase of the Power Rangers franchise from Saban Brands at a later time if they chose. The next day on February 17, 2018, at the New York Toy Fair, Hasbro announced that their toys would start to appear in April 2019 and that the Super Sentai series Tokumei Sentai Go-Busters would be the first season adapted under the re-branded Power Rangers logo as Power Rangers Beast Morphers.

On May 1, 2018, Hasbro announced that it had agreed to purchase the Power Rangers franchise from Saban Brands in a cash-and-stock deal valued at $522 million. On May 25, 2018, it was revealed that Saban Brands was preparing to lay off a majority of its employees with Saban Brands ceasing operation on July 2, 2018, though its parent company Saban Capital Group would remain open for business.

Judd "Chip" Lynn, who resumed executive producer duties for Power Rangers since Dino Charge, returned for Beast Morphers.

The first season finished filming on December 20, 2018. The second season began filming about a month later. Filming for the second season finished on May 22, 2019.

Noam Kaniel (Noam) composes the music for the series alongside Youssef "Joe" Guezoum, and Matt McGuire.

== See also ==
- List of Power Rangers episodes
