= Power Rangers in Space =

American 1998 television series

- Genre: Action-adventure; Science fantasy; Space opera; Superhero
- Created by: Haim Saban; Toei Company
- Based on: Denji Sentai Megaranger by Toei Company
- Developed by: Saban Entertainment; Toei Company
- Showrunner: Judd Lynn
- Directed by: Jonathan Tzachor; Isaac Florentine; Blair Treu; Worth Keeter; Koichi Sakamoto; Judd Lynn; Tony Randel
- Starring: Tracy Lynn Cruz; Patricia Ja Lee; Christopher Khayman Lee; Roger Velasco; Selwyn Ward; Melody Perkins; Paul Schrier; Jason Narvy; Justin Nimmo
- Narrated by: Brad Orchard (episode recap and previews)
- Composers: Shuki Levy; Kussa Mahchi; Kenneth Burgomaster; Jim Cushinery; Paul Gordon; Glenn Scott Lacey; Jeremy Sweet; Ron Wasserman; Inon Zur; Lior Rosner
- Countries of origin: United States; Japan
- Original language: English
- No. of episodes: 43

Production
- Executive producers: Haim Saban; Shuki Levy
- Producer: Jonathan Tzachor
- Production locations: California (Greater Los Angeles Area) (Santa Clarita & Los Angeles); Japan (Greater Tokyo Area) (Tokyo, Saitama, Yokohama and Kyoto)
- Cinematography: Ilan Rosenberg; Sean McLin (2nd unit)
- Running time: 20 minutes
- Production companies: Fox Kids Worldwide; Saban Entertainment; Renaissance Atlantic Entertainment; Toei Company, Ltd. MMPR Productions, Inc.

Original release
- Network: Fox (Fox Kids)
- Release: February 6 – November 21, 1998

Related
- Power Rangers television series

Power Rangers in Space is a television series and the sixth entry of the Power Rangers franchise, based on the 21st Super Sentai series Denji Sentai Megaranger.

In Space was a turning point for the Power Rangers franchise, as the season brought closure to six seasons of plot, and it ended the practice of having regular cast members act in consecutive seasons - which had been in existence since 1993. The theme of this series, and its successor, the Power Rangers Lost Galaxy, bears little similarity to their Sentai counterparts. The sixth series also marked the final regular appearances of Tracy Lynn Cruz, Patricia Ja Lee, Roger Velasco, and Selwyn Ward, as well as the conclusion of Zordon's story that has been significant in the previous six seasons.

== Plot ==
Picking up where Power Rangers Turbo left off, Dark Specter has captured Zordon and is beginning to drain his powers. An assortment of old and new villains praise his victory, but an unexpected figure uncovers his plan: the Red Space Ranger, Andros. Dark Specter orders the Princess of Evil, Astronema, to eliminate Andros so he can't jeopardize his plans.

Meanwhile, four of the former Turbo Rangers (T.J. Johnson, Carlos Vallerte, Ashley Hammond, and Cassie Chan) and Alpha 6 are traveling in a NASADA space shuttle with the intent to save Zordon. They are pulled aboard the Astro Megaship and later encounter Andros. Though initially suspicious and dismissive of the four former Turbo Rangers, Andros realizes he'll need their help to save Zordon and gives them each an Astro Morpher. Additionally, modifications allow the NASADA space shuttle and the Astro Megaship to combine into the powerful Astro Megazord. The new Space Rangers then return to Earth for repairs and supplies, but they are followed by Astronema.

The Space Rangers alternate between searching for Zordon and protecting Earth. From the Dark Fortress, Astronema seeks to eliminate them via Ecliptor (who raised her), Quantrons, and a variety of monsters. Elgar has also been added to her team, but he remains a comedic bungler. Over time, allies (such as the Teenage Mutant Ninja Turtles, the Phantom Ranger, Justin Stewart, and Adam Park) offer the Rangers invaluable aid, with Zhane (the Silver Space Ranger) emerging from cryo-sleep and joining the team. New Zords are also introduced. Meanwhile, Bulk and Skull become assistants to wacky scientist Professor Phenomenus and join him in searching for aliens.

While dedicated to finding Zordon, Andros has another quest: finding his sister, Karone, who was kidnapped when they were children. Over time, Andros discovers his sister was kidnapped by Darkonda, the archrival of Ecliptor, who has nine lives. To Andros' shock, he later discovers that Astronema is Karone, who was raised by Ecliptor to be evil. Andros convinces Astronema of the truth and she defects with Ecliptor's help. Furious at this, Dark Specter launches a planet-destroying asteroid at Earth, which the Rangers are barely able to deflect, but Karone and Ecliptor are both recaptured and reprogrammed to follow Dark Specter in the process.

Astronema, now completely cold and calculating, now not only seeks to destroy the Space Rangers, but also Dark Specter and usurp his ruling power. To that end, she unleashes the Psycho Rangers. The five monstrous and borderline-insane villains possess great power, which secretly comes from Dark Specter, nearly draining him of his life force. Individually, each Psycho Ranger is too powerful for their Space Ranger equivalents. But the Psycho Rangers are not as good with teamwork, and the six Space Rangers overcome them with a great deal of effort and teamwork. Soon after, the Rangers suffer setbacks that see the Delta Megazord and the Mega Voyager destroyed.

The series culminates in the two-part finale, "Countdown to Destruction", where Zordon is nearly completely drained, and Dark Specter orders the villains under his command to attack the entire universe. Across the universe, the Alien and Phantom Rangers, Trey of Triforia, the Blue Senturion, and KO-35's rebels are defeated and captured. The Space Rangers struggle to defend Earth and are overwhelmed and forced to retreat. Darkonda kills Dark Specter, who returns the favor before his own death, leaving Astronema in command as the Queen of Evil. While Andros boards the Dark Fortress to appeal to his sister, the remaining five Space Rangers engage in one last fight for Earth and are joined by the citizens of Angel Grove, with Bulk and Skull leading the charge.

On the Dark Fortress, Andros finds Zordon, who requests his energy tube to be shattered. Doing so will release good energy that will destroy the forces of evil and save the universe, but it will also cause his death. Following battles with Astronema and Ecliptor, Andros has no choice but to comply. The many monsters are subsequently turned to dust by the energy wave (including Ecliptor), while Lord Zedd, Rita Repulsa, Divatox, and Astronema are changed into normal, non-evil humans. With the universe now safe, T.J., Cassie, Carlos, Ashley, and Alpha 6 intend to settle down on Earth. Though initially intending to remain on KO-35 with their people, Andros, Zhane, and Karone decide to join their friends on Earth.

== Production ==
Early production material for the season, dated May and August 1997 when production was concurrently underway for the Fall 1997 episodes of Power Rangers Turbo, was placed online in June 2011. The first half includes synopses of the first twenty-seven episodes of Megaranger, with a mix of Japanese names and intended US names, and a breakdown of how much footage was "usable"; there is a list of weaponry and Zords introduced, how often they appear, and the monsters and how they are destroyed. It then goes on to set out initial plans for the in Space adaptation.

Both Astronema and Andros are absent, with the Phantom Ranger uncovering Dark Specter's plan instead, and Justin is identified as the Blue Ranger. Instead of losing their powers and base at the end of Turbo, the Rangers would be given their Space powers by Dimitria (the Turbo mentor) so they could head into space and save Zordon. Their spacecraft would have had a limited power supply and could only be recharged by the Power Chamber on Earth, forcing them to keep returning; otherwise, they would hop from planet to planet, encountering new and returning villains, and picking up clues for Zordon's whereabouts. Divatox was still going to be the main recurring villain, with Ecliptor as her new second-in-command. Bulk and Skull formed a volunteer Citizen Force Group to try and protect Angel Grove while the Rangers were away.

In Space would have seen Carranger villain Exhaus used as Dark Specter - he would instead be the monster Goldgoyle for the end of Turbo. The Rangers were going to have a base in Earth orbit called the new Power Dome: it was to be realized by "a giant pyramid made of silky material... the walls of silk will change constantly with special effects lights creating the different moods". The "Space Station" (Astro Megaship) interior was going to recycle as much of the Power Chamber set as possible; footage would be shot for the villain's "Evil Platform" set ahead of time and used as recurring stock footage.

This would be also the final season to feature the character Skull (Jason Narvy) as a main character as Narvy himself chose to leave the Power Rangers universe to continue his college education.

== Cast and characters ==
=== Space Rangers ===
- Andros
  The Red Space Ranger, a native of the planet KO-35 and leader of the Space Rangers. He uses his Ranger powers to defeat Astronema and try to recover his sister Karone. He also serves as Ashley's love interest. He piloted the Mega V1 Robo Zord and his primary weapon is the Spiral Drill Saber. He is portrayed by Christopher Khayman Lee.
  The Space Rangers (sans Silver Space Ranger) transformed.
- Carlos Vallerte
  The Black Space Ranger and previously the new Green Turbo Ranger. He piloted the Mega V2 Shuttle Zord and his primary weapon is the Lunar Lance. He is portrayed by Roger Velasco.
- Theodore Jay "T.J." Jarvis Johnson
  The Blue Space Ranger. He was previously the new Red Turbo Ranger, and leader of the Turbo Rangers. He is the second-in-command of the Space Rangers. He piloted the Mega V3 Rocket Zord and his primary weapon is the Astro Axe. He is portrayed by Selwyn Ward.
- Ashley Hammond
  The Yellow Space Ranger and previously the new Yellow Turbo Ranger. She serves as Andros' love interest. She pilots the Mega V4 Saucer Zord and her primary weapon is the Star Slinger. She is portrayed by Tracy Lynn Cruz.
- Cassie Chan
  The Pink Space Ranger and previously the new Pink Turbo Ranger. She pilots the Mega V5 Tank Zord and her primary weapon is the Satellite Stunner. She is portrayed by Patricia Ja Lee.
- Zhane
  The Silver Space Ranger; he is kept in a hidden room inside the Megaship, cryogenically asleep for two years because he was badly injured in his last battle while saving Andros from a monster. When he was accidentally released, he helped the Rangers, but is affected by a 2.5-minute morphing time limit which he is later able to remove by absorbing a bolt of lightning with his Morpher. He piloted the Mega Winger Zord and his primary weapon is the Super Silverizer. During the Psycho Ranger saga, in an effort to confuse and throw off the Psycho Rangers, he temporarily faked being Psycho Silver. He is portrayed by Justin Nimmo.

=== Supporting characters ===
- Alpha 6
  After his voice chip was damaged during the destruction of the Power Chamber, he received a new voice chip, but does not sound the same and has a different personality. Alpha no longer speaks like a New Yorker and now uses his predecessor's catchphrase. He is voiced by Wendee Lee (uncredited).
- D.E.C.A.
  The on-board computer on the Megaship, D.E.C.A. responds to voice commands and is able to articulate in 3000 known languages. The ship is constantly monitored by her through cameras located in every room on the ship. She can also perform retinal scans. She is voiced by Julie Maddalena.
- Adelle Ferguson
  Owner of the Surf Spot, the Rangers' new hangout; from observation, she appears to have bought Youth Center from Jerome Stone and converted it. She is portrayed by Aloma Wright.
- Farkas "Bulk" Bulkmeier
  Returning once again from Turbo, he and Skull decide to seek out renowned alien expert Professor Phenomenus when they catch a glimpse of a UFO in the sky. He is portrayed by Paul Schrier.
- Eugene "Skull" Skullovitch
  Bulk's best friend, and his opposite in appearance and mentality; Skull is thin and more stupid than Bulk, to the point that he has to be told what to be thinking of. Skull is best known for his high-pitched laughter. He is portrayed by Jason A. Narvy.
- Professor Phenomenus
  A strange yet brilliant scientist who is constantly on the search for aliens on Earth. Bulk and Skull sought him out when they caught a glimpse of a UFO in the sky. The trio's misadventures and antics would often have them crossing paths with the Rangers. He is portrayed by Jack Banning.
- Teenage Mutant Ninja Turtles
  The Turtles were summoned and brainwashed by Astronema to fight the Rangers. Her control over them is later broken and they team up with the Rangers to battle Astronema's forces. Before returning to New York, the Turtles had one request: space surfing on the Galaxy Gliders. Due to Ninja Turtles: The Next Mutation being filmed in Vancouver, none of the Turtles' voice actors reprised their roles for their appearance.
  - Leonardo
    The leader of the Teenage Mutant Ninja Turtles. He is voiced by Michael Reisz.
  - Raphael
    The aggressive, cool but crude member of the Teenage Mutant Ninja Turtles. He is voiced by Kim Strauss.
  - Donatello
    The scientific member of the Teenage Mutant Ninja Turtles. He is voiced by Ezra Weisz.
  - Michelangelo
    The fun-loving "Party Dude" of the Teenage Mutant Ninja Turtles. He is voiced by Tony Oliver.
  - Venus de Milo
    A female turtle and Shinobi who is the latest member of the group. She is voiced by Tifanie Christun.
- Alien Rangers
  The Power Rangers from the water planet Aquitar. They have been allies to the Power Rangers of Earth, since Zordon called upon them when Master Vile reversed Earth's time. The Alien Rangers were later seen fighting Divatox's army on planet Gratha.
- Justin Stewart
  T.J. Johnson, Cassie Chan, Ashley Hammond, and Carlos Vallerte's former teammate. After the destruction of the Power Chamber and the loss of the Turbo powers, Justin elected to remain on Earth to be with his father. Storm Blaster tracked him down and gave Justin a new Turbo morpher, to help the Space Rangers. He is portrayed by Blake Foster.
- Karone
  Andros' sister and the main anti-hero of the series, She was kidnapped as a child by Darkonda and handed over to Dark Specter. Karone was raised by Ecliptor, who became a father figure to her. He told that her parents were killed by the Power Rangers, she would come to be known as "Astronema", Princess of Evil. She would eventually discover the truth and defect to the Rangers' side for a time, before being captured and brainwashed to be completely loyal to Dark Specter when she went to the Dark Fortress in order to reprogram an asteroid that Dark Specter had sent on a collision course with Earth. Karone was eventually reverted to herself by Zordon's energy wave in the finale. She later became the second Pink Galaxy Ranger in the following season. She is portrayed by Melody Perkins.
- Trey of Triforia (Gold Zeo Ranger)
  Wielder of the Golden Power Staff, who temporarily passed his powers onto Jason Scott in Zeo, while he healed after being split into three distinct personalities. Trey was later seen fighting Rita Repulsa and Lord Zedd's army in the Vica Galaxy.
- Blue Senturion
  An intergalactic police officer from 2000; he originally was sent back in time to warn Dimitria of the United Alliance of Evil's plot, but now helps enforce the law and defeat villains. He also assisted the Turbo Rangers, before departing to Eltar with Dimitria to help Zordon. The Blue Senturion was later seen with the Phantom Ranger fighting the Machine Empire and General Havoc's army on the Phantom Ranger's homeworld. He is voiced by David Walsh (uncredited).
- Phantom Ranger
  A Ranger of unknown origins. He had helped the second Turbo Rangers fight Divatox. He and Cassie share a bond. The Phantom Ranger helped the rangers gain access to a new Megazord and was later seen with the Blue Senturion fighting the Machine Empire and General Havoc's army on the Phantom Ranger's homeworld.
- Zordon
  Founder and former mentor of the Mighty Morphin Power Rangers, Power Rangers Zeo, and original Turbo Rangers. Zordon returned to his home planet of Eltar, only to be captured; Dark Specter proceeded to continually drain Zordon of his powers while filling his container with lava, ensuring all Rangers would lose hope. With Dark Specter's destruction, Zordon regained his powers, only to sacrifice himself to unleash an energy wave that wiped out the United Alliance of Evil. He is voiced by Robert L. Manahan (uncredited).
- Adam Park
  Carlos' predecessor and Zack's successor, Adam was the new Mighty Morphin Black Ranger, Green Zeo Ranger, and the original Green Turbo Ranger. When Carlos began doubting himself following a disastrous fight with Lizwizard, Adam helped him through it. Adam also held onto his morpher when Rito destroyed his team's powers. He succeeded in morphing into the Black Mighty Morphin Ranger once more, though it nearly killed him. He is portrayed by Johnny Yong Bosch.

=== Villains ===
- Dark Specter
  The "Grand Monarch of Evil", who all other villains fear, Dark Specter appears as a gigantic lava-monster. He is the leader of the United Alliance of Evil. He was shown to have the ability to shape shift. Dark Specter was responsible for the fall of Eltar, he managed to capture Zordon and proceeded to slowly drain his powers throughout the season. He nearly met his end with the creation of the Psycho Rangers, who drew their energy from the evil monarch every time they fought. He was killed in the finale by Darkonda, who had stolen a Velocifighter armed with an experimental laser. With his dying breath, he devoured Darkonda before exploding. He is voiced by Christopher Grey. (Note: Dark Specter is a recycled version of Maligore from Turbo: A Power Rangers Movie. At one point in "From Out of Nowhere" Pt. 1, Divatox commented to Dark Specter that he reminded Divatox of her fiancé.)
- Astronema
  The "Princess of Evil", Astronema is a sinister and ruthless villainess who was groomed as a child in the ways of evil. There are hints she isn't as evil as is led to believe, such as when she saves the lives of a family under attack by one of her own Quantrons. It is later discovered that she is Karone, sister of the Red Space Ranger Andros. She defected to the Rangers' side for a time, before being captured, brainwashed and given cybernetic implants which overwrote her emotions. As a result of this, her demeanor became cold, and even more ruthless and evil than before. She would later create the Psycho Rangers and link their powers directly to Dark Specter in an attempt to do away with the monarch and take power for herself. When Dark Specter is killed in the finale, she becomes the "Queen of Evil", she is seemingly killed accidentally during a confrontation with Andros, but is revived by Andros' tears. In Power Rangers Beast Morphers, Astronema's gauntlet was found in Ryjack's collection of weapons. Astronema was Robo-Roxy's choice to be revived into Evox's army only for Robo-Blaze to comment that Astronema was purified much of Robo-Roxy's disgust. She is portrayed by Melody Perkins.
- Ecliptor
  A wire-frame model-themed robot who is Astronema's guardian and surrogate father. He raised Astronema to be evil, caring for her like his own daughter. After Astronema learns her true identity, Ecliptor remained devoted to his princess, defending her against the attacks of his own forces. Branded a traitor, he is given additional cybernetics that suppress his better nature and make him purely evil. Upon seeing Astronema seemingly slain by her brother, Ecliptor broke free of his programming to get revenge. Despite his fatherly affection for Astronema, and his high regard for loyalty and honor, Ecliptor was killed by Zordon's energy wave. He is voiced by Walter Lang.
- Elgar
  Divatox's idiotic, illiterate clown/biker-themed nephew. He was reassigned to the Dark Fortress by Dark Specter, mostly to allow Divatox to move Zordon around the universe without his bumbling threatening to ruin things. He is killed by Zordon's energy wave. He is portrayed by Kenny Graceson and voiced by David Umansky.
- Darkonda
  A bandaged bounty hunter who was responsible for kidnapping Karone as a child. Sadistic and treacherous, Darkonda was the arch rival to Ecliptor. He was given 9 lives, but managed to lose all but one though bungling or being defeated. He planned to kill Dark Specter with the missile intended for Earth's destruction, but was swallowed by the evil monarch before he perished. He is voiced by Steve Kramer.
- Darkliptor
  An entity which is created when Darkonda forcibly absorbs Ecliptor into himself, thereby adding all of Ecliptor's powers and some of Ecliptor's physical being to Darkonda's own. When Darkliptor exists, Darkonda's personality is dominant, and with Ecliptor's powers on top of Darkonda's, Darkliptor is near invincible. Ecliptor constantly tries to free himself from Darkliptor, and always succeeds eventually, to Darkonda's annoyance. He is voiced by Steve Kramer.
- Quantrons
  Astronema's foot soldiers. Appearing as silver robots with blades as their primary weapons. Like the Cogs before them, they pilot vehicles for attacks. The Quantrons are the fourth group of foot soldiers created for Power Rangers and don't have a Sentai counterpart.
- Craterites
  Foot soldiers from the Astro Megaship simudeck's training program. A lightning bolt once hit the Megaship while T.J. And Ashley were doing a session, causing them to become real and hide among the people in Angel Grove by disguising themselves as humans. After fighting the Rangers, they then merged into a Conglomerate version of themselves. After being defeated by the Astro Megazord, they were once again part of the simudeck program. The Megaranger counterparts of the Craterites are called Soldiers Kunekune.
- Piranhatrons
  Divatox's piranha-armored foot soldiers from Power Rangers Turbo. Some of them were placed under Astronema's control.

==== Psycho Rangers ====
The Psycho Rangers are five evil Rangers created by Astronema as part of her plans to destroy both the Power Rangers and Dark Specter. After each of them was destroyed in their monster forms, they returned as ghosts where they stalked the Rangers in Secret City. When in their monster forms, the Psycho Rangers were imprisoned in data cards until they came into Deviot's possession in Power Rangers Lost Galaxy.

The Power Rangers comic story "Power Rangers: The Psycho Path" by Boom! Studios gave the Psycho Rangers a more-detailed origin where Astronema killed some individuals for raw material that she used to create them with help from Dark Spector. In addition, there was also a Psycho Green.

- Psycho Red
  Psycho Red was the leader of the Psycho Rangers. His monster form was a fire monster. In Power Rangers Beast Morphers, Psycho Red's data card was found in Ryjack's collection of weapons. Robo-Blaze recommended him as a choice to be revived only for Robo-Roxy to mention that he would mostly target the Red Ranger while Snide states that the Reanimizer needs more diamonds if they are to reanimate the rest of the Psycho Rangers. He is portrayed and voiced by Patrick David.
- Psycho Black
  His monster form is a rock monster who can use a rock-like tentacle. He is portrayed and voiced by Michael Maize.
- Psycho Blue
  His monster form is a crystalline ice monster with freezing powers. He is voiced by Wally Wingert.
- Psycho Yellow
  In her monster form, Psycho Yellow is a spider-like monster. She is portrayed and voiced by Kamera Walton.
- Psycho Pink
  In her monster form, Psycho Pink is a plant-like monster. She is voiced by Vicki Davis.

==== United Alliance of Evil ====
Villains from previous series also appeared as members of the United Alliance of Evil where they were gathered by Dark Specter.

- Lord Zedd - An evil intergalactic warlord. He is portrayed by Ed Neil and voiced by Robert Axelrod.
  - Rita Repulsa - An evil alien witch who is married to Lord Zedd. She is portrayed by Carla Perez and voiced by Barbara Goodson.
  - Goldar - A manticore-themed henchman of Lord Zedd and Rita Repulsa. Goldar was seen at Dark Specter's party on the Cimmerian Planet and during the attack on the Vica Galaxy where he does an energy attack on the Gold Ranger. He is voiced by Kerrigan Mahan.
  - Finster - A leprechaun/terrier-themed henchman of Lord Zedd and Rita Repulsa. Finster was seen at Dark Specter's party on the Cimmerian Planet and during the attack on the Vica Galaxy. He is voiced by Robert Axelrod.
  - Squatt - A hobgoblin-themed henchman of Lord Zedd and Rita Repulsa. Squatt was seen during the attack on the Vica Galaxy.
  - Master Vile - Rita Repulsa's father. He was only seen at Dark Specter's party on the Cimmerian Planet.
  - Z Putty Patrollers - The clay golem-themed foot soldiers of Lord Zedd.
  - Tenga Warriors - The karasu-tengu-themed foot soldiers of Lord Zedd and Rita Repulsa.
- The Machine Empire - A kingdom of robots.
  - King Mondo - The king of the Machine Empire. He is voiced by David Stenstrom.
  - Queen Machina - The queen of the Machine Empire. She is voiced by Brianne Siddall.
  - Prince Sprocket - The son of King Mondo and Queen Machina. He is voiced by Barbara Goodson.
  - Klank and Orbus - The aids of King Mondo. They are voiced by Oliver Page and Barbara Goodson.
  - Cogs - The Sun Wukong/industrial robot-themed foot soldiers of the Machine Empire.
- Divatox - The leader of the Space Pirates and Elgar's aunt who becomes a rival of Astronema. She is portrayed by Hilary Shepard (also known as "Hilary Shepard Turner").
  - Rygog - Divatox's octopus/biker-themed second-in-command. He was present at Divatox's attack on Gratha. He is voiced by Lex Lang.
  - Porto - Divatox's technical diving suit-clad advisor. He is voiced by Scott Page-Pagter.
  - General Havoc - Divatox's brother and Elgar's uncle. He accompanied the Machine Empire in attacking the Phantom Ranger's home world where they were opposed by the Blue Senturion and the Phantom Ranger. He is voiced by Richard Cansino.
  - Putra Pod - The Stegosaurus-like foot soldiers. A Putra Pod was seen at Dark Specter's party on the Cimmerian Planet.

== Episodes ==
No.	Title	Directed by	Written by	Original release date	Prod. code
1	"From Out of Nowhere"	Jonathan Tzachor	Judd Lynn	February 6, 1998	601
2	"From Out of Nowhere"	Jonathan Tzachor	Judd Lynn	February 13, 1998	602
A mysterious cloaked figure infiltrates a meeting of Dark Specter's alliance as they celebrate Dark Specter's conquest of Eltar and capture of Zordon. The cloaked figure is later revealed to be a Red Ranger, and escapes on his galaxy glider to the Astro Megaship. Dark Specter orders Astronema to pursue him. Meanwhile, T.J., Cassie, Carlos, and Ashley's space flight is interrupted when the Astro Megaship pulls them in. The Red Ranger returns and encounters the four Earth Rangers, initially treating them as intruders. Astronema sends a space cruiser shaped like a criosphinx, which damages the Astro Megaship and forces it to make an emergency landing on a rocky planet. The Red Ranger then reveals himself to be Andros. After initially sending the four Earth Rangers on their way, Andros returns to save them from Astronema's Quantrons and gives them their new Astro Morphers, thus forming a new team of Power Rangers. While back on the Astro Megaship, the rangers are again attacked by the criosphinx ship, but Alpha figures out the code to combine the Astro Megaship and the space shuttle into the Astro Megazord, with which they destroy the criosphinx ship.
3	"Save Our Ship"	Isaac Florentine	Judd Lynn	February 20, 1998	603
The Rangers return to Earth with Andros and an explosive welcome from Ecliptor and Astronema, which threatens to make their stopover permanent.
4	"Shell Shocked"	Blair Treu	Judd Lynn	February 27, 1998	604
Astronema uses her powers to make the Teenage Mutant Ninja Turtles evil and has them con the Rangers into letting them on the Megaship so that they can take it over for her. Note: This episode is a crossover with Ninja Turtles: The Next Mutation.
5	"Never Stop Searching"	Blair Treu	Steve Roth	March 6, 1998	605
Andros investigates some energy readings coming from KO-35, believing it to be his lost sister. What he finds is Ecliptor waiting for him instead.
6	"Satellite Search"	Blair Treu	Judd Lynn	March 13, 1998	606
A satellite holding valuable information crash lands on the planet Kalderon. The Rangers find it, but Astronema battles them and steals it. She then ties the Rangers up to be eaten by a Clawhammer.
7	"A Ranger Among Thieves"	Worth Keeter	Judd Lynn	March 20, 1998	607
Andros befriends a trio of thieves, who become endangered when a monster who can harness electricity attacks their stolen car hideout.
8	"When Push Comes to Shove"	Worth Keeter	Judd Lynn	March 27, 1998	608
Cassie is blackmailed into going out with a loser, who she finds out not to be such a bad guy. The date goes awry when one of Astronema's monsters tries to knock down the building they are in, which happens to contain a nuclear device.
9	"The Craterite Invasion"	Worth Keeter	Judd Lynn	April 3, 1998	609
A cosmic storm causes a malfunction on the Megaship's Simudeck, resulting in the program's Craterites to multiply, escape, and attack Angel Grove.
10	"The Wasp With a Heart"	Koichi Sakamoto	Judd Lynn	April 4, 1998	610
A wasp monster named Waspicable doesn't have it in him to be evil, and he helps and befriends Cassie, who sticks up for him when confronted by the other Rangers. But the Rangers have to deal with the evil Sting King.
11	"The Delta Discovery"	Koichi Sakamoto	Judd Lynn	April 11, 1998	611
The Rangers investigate a planet on their search for Zordon and find the Phantom Ranger, wounded from an attack by Divatox. He gives Andros a disk, which gives him control of the Delta Megaship.
12	"The Great Evilyzer"	Worth Keeter	Judd Lynn	April 18, 1998	612
Professor Phenomenus develops a ray that can turn objects evil. Astronema steals and uses it against the Rangers by turning the Delta Megazord evil. The Rangers must regain control of the Delta Megazord by combining it with the Astro Megaship.
13	"Grandma Matchmaker"	Worth Keeter	Judd Lynn	April 25, 1998	613
Ashley's grandmother visits Angel Grove intent on seeing Ashley engaged before she leaves, and she inadvertently gets caught up in one of the Rangers' battles.
14	"The Barillian Sting"	Judd Lynn	John Fletcher	May 2, 1998	614
Darkonda arrives and releases a Barillian Bug that stings Carlos, and causes him to mutate. He later stings Cassie, who also mutates. The Rangers must defeat the insect and cure Cassie and Carlos before they destroy the ship.
15	"T.J.'s Identity Crisis"	Worth Keeter	Judd Lynn	May 9, 1998	615
A blow to the head causes T.J. to lose his memory, just as three Rangers are captured by Darkonda, who has absorbed Ecliptor and becomes Darkliptor.
16	"Flashes of Darkonda"	Jonathan Tzachor	Judd Lynn	May 16, 1998	616
Andros does some undercover work on the planet Onyx, where Darkonda is hanging out at a casino. He manages to beat a group of aliens in a game of cards, and wins a set of key cards belonging to Zordon. He escapes the planet and finally realizes Darkonda is responsible for kidnapping his long-lost sister. Unfortunately, he proves to be a challenge for the Rangers' Megazord.
17	"The Rangers' Mega Voyage"	Judd Lynn	Judd Lynn	September 12, 1998	701
Faced with being defeated, the Rangers find the location of the Mega Vehicles - five powerful spacecraft which combine into the Mega Voyager, and gain control of them with Zordon's key cards.
18	"True Blue to the Rescue"	Judd Lynn	Judd Lynn	September 19, 1998	702
The Rangers are captured by Astronema while trying to rescue Storm Blaster. But Storm Blaster escapes and brings back the Blue Turbo Ranger Justin, who saves the Rangers and is reunited with his former teammates. He is also introduced to Andros as they go to rescue Lightning Cruiser. Guest Starring: Blake Foster
19	"Invasion of the Body Switcher"	Judd Lynn	Jackie Marchand	September 26, 1998	703
A monster with the ability to alter appearances changes Astronema into Ashley then swap places with her on her birthday, allowing her to sneak aboard the Megaship and capture all the rangers except Andros. Ashley tricks the monster and Elgar after she transforms into Astronema, which enables her to escape and work to save the others.
20	"Survival of the Silver"	Worth Keeter	Judd Lynn	October 3, 1998	704
While on a hostile alien world, the Megaship is attacked, damaging a cryogenic chamber which holds Zhane, the Silver Ranger, who was placed there by Andros after sustaining severe injuries. As the Rangers defend the Megaship, Zhane re-awakens and lends a hand, much to Andros' surprise.
21	"Red with Envy"	Worth Keeter	Judd Lynn	October 10, 1998	705
Andros is infuriated when he suspects that Zhane is trying to put the moves on Ashley, leading him to order Zhane to stay on the ship while the Rangers go into battle, but it turns out that they need him, as Zhane also goes and helps them out. Unfortunately, Zhane discovers he cannot stay morphed for too long.
22	"The Silver Secret"	Worth Keeter	Jackie Marchand	October 14, 1998	706
A diagnostic reveals that Zhane only has a limited time to stay morphed. Astronema deduces this and sends down a monster to exploit his weakness.
23	"A Date with Danger"	Koichi Sakamoto	Jackie Marchand	October 15, 1998	707
When Astronema is attacked by one of her monsters, Zhane comes to her rescue, and the two find that they are strongly attracted to each other.
24	"Zhane's Destiny"	Worth Keeter	Judd Lynn	October 16, 1998	708
The Rangers investigate readings from a planet, and find a group of rebels from KO-35 have set up camp there. Unfortunately, Darkonda is among them in disguise as an officer, who tries to turn the people against the Rangers. Afterwards, Zhane subsequently stays to help the rebels.
25	"Always a Chance"	Koichi Sakamoto	Judd Lynn	October 17, 1998	709
During a battle, Carlos accidentally injures Cassie, giving him severe doubts about whether he is fit to be a Ranger. By undergoing training with former Ranger Adam, he regains his confidence. When a monster attacks a powerless Carlos, Adam must risk his life to morph into the Mighty Morphin Black Ranger using a damaged Power Morpher to save him. Guest Starring: Johnny Yong Bosch
26	"The Secret of the Locket"	Worth Keeter	Judd Lynn	October 21, 1998	710
While fighting the Rangers, Andros inadvertently tears off Astronema's locket, and discovers a picture of himself and his sister as children, meaning that Astronema is his long lost sister, Karone. But Astronema refuses to believe him, and she says he will pay dearly for trying to trick her.
27	"Astronema Thinks Twice"	Worth Keeter	Judd Lynn	October 23, 1998	711
Astronema now knows her real past and wonders whether she should be evil. She meets Andros on a desolate planet, and joins his side, leaving with him for the Megaship, and they set course to find Zordon, despite the other Rangers not trusting her initially.
28	"The Rangers' Leap of Faith"	Jonathan Tzachor	Judd Lynn	October 24, 1998	712
Astronema leads the Rangers to the planet where Zordon is being held captive, but it turns out to be a trap set up by Dark Specter to capture the Rangers. In the end, Astronema comes to her senses as Karone and saves the Rangers.
29	"Dark Specter's Revenge"	Tony Randel	Judd Lynn & Jackie Marchand	October 28, 1998	713
30	"Dark Specter's Revenge"	Tony Randel	Judd Lynn & Jackie Marchand	October 29, 1998	714
Dark Specter wants Astronema back, and to accomplish this, he sends an asteroid on a collision course with Earth. Karone sneaks aboard the Dark Fortress to divert the asteroid's path but is captured by Ecliptor, who has been brainwashed with cybernetic programing by Darkonda. After all three Megazords struggle to push the Asteroid back, Zhane returns with his new Mega Winger to help his team send the asteroid away from Earth. He and Andros then set out to retrieve Karone, but it turns out that she has been brainwashed back into Astronema again by Darkonda, only more evil than before.
31	"Rangers Gone Psycho"	Judd Lynn	Judd Lynn	October 30, 1998	715
Five imposters posing as the Power Rangers are wreaking havoc in Angel Grove. The real Power Rangers confront them, and they reveal themselves to be the Psycho Rangers, homicidal machines sent by Astronema. The Psychos read the Rangers' minds and prove to be difficult to defeat with their knowledge of the Rangers' fighting techniques.
32	"Carlos on Call"	Judd Lynn	Judd Lynn	October 31, 1998	716
A little girl named Silvy discovers that Carlos is the Black Ranger when she finds pictures of him morphing in a photo booth. She uses this knowledge to blackmail him into spending time with her, which drives Carlos nuts. He later learns that Silvy's neediness was due to how she lost her brother due to illness.
33	"A Rift in the Rangers"	Worth Keeter	Judd Lynn	November 4, 1998	717
Ashley and Cassie quarrel over doing chores on the Megaship. When Psycho Yellow and Pink manage to capture Ashley, Cassie regrets her argument and goes to rescue Ashley.
34	"Five of a Kind"	Worth Keeter	Judd Lynn	November 5, 1998	718
T.J. comes up with a way to defeat the Psycho Rangers. Since they are designed to fight their respective Ranger color, he suggests each Ranger fight a different Psycho. Unfortunately, this fails, so the Rangers all disguise themselves as the Blue Ranger, and to confuse them even further, Zhane jumps in as Psycho Silver.
35	"Silence is Golden"	Worth Keeter	Judd Lynn & Jackie Marchand	November 6, 1998	719
The Psycho Rangers scour the city in search of the Space Rangers in their demorphed form, using voice recognition. Cassie is in town and must remain quiet to avoid being found. In the end, the Psychos capture the Mega Voyager, taking it into another dimension.
36	"The Enemy Within"	Worth Keeter	Judd Lynn & Jackie Marchand	November 7, 1998	720
The Rangers launch a surprise attack to retrieve the Mega Voyager and defeat the Psycho Rangers once and for all, but they wind up falling into a trap.
37	"Andros and the Stowaway"	Worth Keeter	Judd Lynn	November 11, 1998	721
While searching an alien planet for Zordon, Andros saves a small alien who was enslaved by a monster named Jakarak. Jakarak wants his captive back, and the Rangers must defeat him to defend the little stowaway's freedom.
38	"Mission to Secret City"	Koichi Sakamoto	Judd Lynn	November 12, 1998	722
Astronema creates a secret city, where one of her monsters teleports captives to, including Carlos, Andros, and Silvy. With Silvy's help, Andros unleashes the true power of his battlizer, morphing into the Red Battlized Ranger.
39	"Ghosts in the Machine"	Worth Keeter	Jackie Marchand	November 13, 1998	723
Astronema develops a machine that transforms matter into data. The ghosts of the Psycho Rangers use it in reverse to restore themselves into their physical plane. With help from Zhane, the Rangers trap the Psychos under the machine, and are re-digitized, causing the Secret City to collapse.
40	"The Impenetrable Web"	Judd Lynn	Judd Lynn & Jackie Marchand	November 14, 1998	724
Ecliptor gains access to the Astro Megaship and creates a web that prevents the Rangers from getting in or out of the ship. Ecliptor increases his powers and battles the Rangers, destroying the Delta Megazord in the process.
41	"A Line in the Sand"	Judd Lynn	Judd Lynn & Jackie Marchand	November 18, 1998	725
A sinister Humvee is tracking down the Rangers and teleporting them to a desolate wasteland. The Rangers lose the Mega Voyager in battle with the Humvee's true form, Tankenstein.
42	"Countdown to Destruction"	Jonathan Tzachor	Story by : Koichi Sakamoto; Teleplay by : Judd Lynn	November 20, 1998	726
43	"Countdown to Destruction"	Jonathan Tzachor	Story by : Koichi Sakamoto; Teleplay by : Judd Lynn	November 21, 1998	727
The Millennium Message has come to pass as Dark Specter sends the order for all villains in the universe to begin their assault on everything in sight. Divatox, Rita, Zedd, Astronema, and the Machine Empire overtake the Alien Rangers, Gold Ranger, Blue Senturion, Phantom Ranger, and the Space Rangers in furious battles throughout the universe and on Earth. Dark Specter and Darkonda destroy each other, and Astronema becomes the new Monarch of Evil, and orders the citizens of Angel Grove to hand over the Power Rangers. Everyone declares themself a Ranger, infuriating her; however, the real Rangers arrive and morph in front of everyone. Inspired by the Rangers, Bulk and Skull lead the citizens in a charge against Astronema’s army. Meanwhile, Andros snuck aboard the Dark Fortress in hopes of reverting Astronema to Karone and discovers Zordon held captive. Zordon wants his energy tube shattered to release a purifying wave that will purge the forces of evil at the cost of his life. Astronema attacks, but her blast accidentally ricochets off of the spiral saber, and onto her, killing her. Ecliptor tries killing Andros in revenge, forcing Andros to reluctantly comply with Zordon's order. The energy wave spreads across the universe, reducing the United Alliance of Evil to dust, while Rita, Zedd, and Divatox are turned into humans. While the Rangers are celebrated as heroes, Andros mourns his sister when his tears revert her to Karone. The Rangers and Karone then return to Earth to stay.

== Home media ==
A VHS release for Power Rangers in Space contained the "Psycho Rangers" arc.

In 2012, Shout! Factory announced that it had reached an exclusive distribution deal with Saban Brands for shows such as Power Rangers and Big Bad Beetleborgs. Power Rangers in Space was released on DVD in August 2012, as part of a Time-Life exclusive boxed set containing seasons 1–7. The show later became available independently of the boxed set in two volumes, the first volume consisting of first 22 episodes was released on August 5, 2014 and the second volume containing the remaining 21 episodes was released on October 7, 2014.

== Comics ==
Characters have been featured in Power Rangers comics published by Boom! Studios.

In 2018, the In Space Rangers appeared in "Shattered Grid", a crossover event between teams from all eras commemorating the 25th anniversary of the original television series. It was published in Mighty Morphin Power Rangers #25-30 and various tie-ins. A Power Rangers in Space story by Adam Cesare and Hyeonjin Kimwas was published in Mighty Morphin Power Rangers 2018 Annual as part of the crossover.

"Beyond the Grid," the follow-up to "Shattered Grid", was published in Mighty Morphin Power Rangers #31-39. It saw Andros joining a new team alongside the Ranger Slayer, the Magna Defender, Cameron, Tanya and the Dark Ranger.

A story by Trey Moore and Da Jung Lee, featuring Karone and both the In Space and Lost Galaxy Rangers, was published in Mighty Morphin Power Rangers 25th Anniversary Special #1.

In 2019, Saban's Power Rangers: The Psycho Path by Paul Allor and Diego Galindo was published. An original graphic novel taking place after the events of the Power Rangers in Space television series, it features both the return and origin of the Psycho Rangers.

In 2022, Power Rangers #17-22 featured Andros, and later Zhane, in a story taking place before the events of the Power Rangers in Space television series.

== Reception ==
Most critics gave the show a positive reception.
