= Judd Lynn =

American television producer, writer and director (born 1961)

- Born: January 16, 1961 (age 65); Westchester County, New York, United States
- Other names: Chip Lynn
- Occupations: Writer, producer, director, story editor
- Employer(s): ANA Productions (1992); The Cannon Group (1993); Saban Entertainment (1993-2001); The Walt Disney Company (2009); Saban Brands (2015-2018); Allspark Pictures (2019); Entertainment One (Hasbro) (2020)
- Known for: Writer/director/producer of Power Rangers

Judd "Chip" Lynn is an American television writer, producer, and director.

He is known for his work on the children's action/adventure series Power Rangers. He spent the first few years as Production Manager and directed second unit scenes for Turbo: A Power Rangers Movie, before becoming a director on the show. He served as a staff writer during the second season, before gaining greater influence as the story editor/head writer for more than five years beginning midway though Power Rangers Turbo, and Co-Producer beginning with Power Rangers in Space, finally leaving after Power Rangers Time Force.

Lynn chose to base the sixth season of the series in space, as opposed to the video game themes of the Super Sentai source material, Denji Sentai Megaranger, from where the show took its suits and mecha. The stabs at more intense originality in the Power Rangers version led to a greater effort in all American Ranger fight scenes, original villains, and overall much darker content than seen in previous incarnations.

Lynn eventually returned to the franchise and wrote two episodes of Power Rangers Jungle Fury under the pseudonym Ally Mondera and as an Executive Producer for Power Rangers RPM, after the newly appointed Eddie Guzelian was relieved from his duties as executive producer by Disney employees during the middle of the season.

At Power Morphicon 2010, Lynn told fans he would not be a part of Saban's 2011 Power Rangers season Power Rangers Samurai. However, In 2014, Lynn returned to the series, again in an executive producer role, helming 2015's Power Rangers Dino Charge. He also serves as executive producer of the 2017 season, Power Rangers Ninja Steel and the 2019 season, Power Rangers Beast Morphers. In January 2020, it was announced that Simon Bennett would be taking over duties as Executive Producer, leaving Lynn's future with the franchise uncertain. However, on June 18, Bennett confirmed that Lynn was working closely with him on developing the story for Power Rangers Dino Fury.

Lynn, formerly a member of Writers Guild of America West, left and maintained financial core status in 2014.

== Screenwriting credits ==
=== Television ===
- Mighty Morphin Power Rangers (1994-1995)
- VR Troopers (1995-1996)
- Power Rangers Turbo (1997)
- Power Rangers in Space (1998)
- Power Rangers Lost Galaxy (1999)
- Power Rangers Lightspeed Rescue (2000)
- Power Rangers Time Force (2001)
- Power Rangers Jungle Fury (2008)
- Power Rangers RPM (2009)
- Power Rangers Dino Charge (2015-2016)
- Power Rangers Ninja Steel (2017-2018)
- Power Rangers Beast Morphers (2019-2020)

=== Film ===
- Shootfighter: Fight to the Death (1993)

== Director ==
- Power Rangers Turbo (1997)
- Power Rangers in Space (1998)
- Power Rangers Lost Galaxy (1999)
- Power Rangers Lightspeed Rescue (2000)
- Power Rangers Time Force (2001)

== Producer ==
- Power Rangers in Space (1998)
- Power Rangers Lost Galaxy (1999)
- Power Rangers Lightspeed Rescue (2000)
- Power Rangers Time Force (2001)
- Power Rangers RPM (2009)
- Power Rangers Dino Charge (2015-2016)
- Power Rangers Ninja Steel (2017-2018)
- Power Rangers Beast Morphers (2019-2020)
