= Zack Taylor =

Fictional character

- Power Rangers character
- Walter Jones as Zack
- First appearance: Day of the Dumpster (Mighty Morphin Power Rangers)
- Portrayed by: Walter Emanuel Jones; Ludi Lin (2017 reboot); Naoki Ofuji (suit actor); Yasuhiko Imai (suit actor)
- Voiced by: Isaac Robinson-Smith (Rita's Rewind)

In-universe information
- Title: Black Power Ranger
- Fighting style: Karateka; Hip Hop Kido
- Children: Minh Kwan (legal ward)
- Home: Earth
- Color(s): Black
- Status: Active
- Zords: Mastodon Dinozord; Lion Thunderzord

Zachary "Zack" Taylor is a fictional character in the Power Rangers universe, appearing in the television series Mighty Morphin Power Rangers. He is the first on-screen Black Ranger of Power Rangers. He would be succeeded as the Black Ranger by Adam Park. A reimagined version of Zack, now Chinese-American, would appear in the 2017 reboot film, played by Canadian actor Ludi Lin.

== Character history ==
=== Television ===
==== Mighty Morphin Power Rangers ====
Zack and his close friends Kimberly Hart, Jason Lee Scott, Billy Cranston and Trini Kwan were picked as the five original Power Rangers by the wise sage Zordon to defend Earth from the evil sorceress Rita Repulsa. After traveling through time Zack was chosen as the Black Power Ranger, gaining the Mastodon Power Coin and the Mastodon Dinozord.

Quick-witted and clever, Zack relies on a combination of skill, strength, and agility to win his battles. The original Black Ranger is an energetic, charismatic, and fun-loving young man. He enjoys athletics (such as basketball, American football, and scuba diving), dancing (especially to a fresh beat bumping out of his friend's boombox), parties, and girls. Whenever he didn't have an arm around Trini or Kimberly, Zack could be found pursuing his attractive, but hard-to-get classmate, Angela. Zack always loved a good joke. Though he loved all the people close to him, Zack's best friend was clearly Jason. Zack is extremely confident and positive. Only four occasions saw Zack ready to give it up: when the Green Ranger took out Zordon, Alpha 5 and the Command Center while removing the Rangers from the Megazord; when his team was placed under a spell to take away their confidence; and when their Dinozords were commandeered by Lord Zedd's first monster, Pirantishead. But the first occasion happened very early in the series when his friends pretended to have forgotten his birthday. Zack went off into a secluded area, and into a trap by Rita Repulsa. For some time, he had to fight the powerful Knasty Knight alone. Oddly enough, despite his plentiful confidence, Zack is an extreme ophidiophobe, arachnophobe, and entomophobe meaning he is terrified of snakes, spiders, and insects although, on one occasion when performing magic for a group of children seeking shelter from a monster attack, he handled two fake snakes and used them to scare off Bulk and Skull. Because of this, it can be assumed that Zack's fear of snakes deteriorated over time, especially after an encounter on Rita's Island of Illusion where his strength of will was tested against his fear of snakes.

Zack enjoyed martial arts just as much as he did dancing and, as a result, created his own fighting style, called Hip Hop kido. The customized art consisted of dance-like maneuvers flourished with fast and powerful strikes, much like Capoeira or as seen by actor Daniel O' Neill in Bangkok Adrenaline. This effective combination of power and prowess made Zack an incredibly formidable combatant. However, he would sometimes tone down his style and mimic the attacks of Billy to simultaneously strike opponents. He was also very resourceful. On several occasions, it was his cunning that led his team to victory. Such occasions included his discovery of the means to overcome the Knasty Knight who was sent to isolate and destroy him on his birthday- the monster possessed the ability to redistribute the Ranger's force in order to fry the weapons they used against him. When the storm-bringing chimera monster Goatan froze the Megazord, Zack analyzed what little resources the Megazord had left and used it to regain dominance in the battle.

After Tommy Oliver joined the team, he and Zack quickly became close friends as a result of their similar interests. When Tommy was nervous about trying to engage a romantic relationship with Kimberly, it was Zack who Tommy sought for advice. Before Tommy appeared (or if Tommy is not at the Youth Center) Zack is usually Jason's sparring partner when practicing Karate. Tommy and Zack would also act as sparring partners for each other, as well. Though Jason was the Ranger Tommy selected to take on his Green Ranger powers after Rita eliminated Tommy's link to the Morphing Grid, Zack is the only other individual to don the Dragon Shield when Tommy gave it to him so that its enhanced regenerative powers could heal Zack from the Oysterizer monster's acidic attack.

In the Season 2 episode "Green No More, Part 1", Zack's cousin Curtis was introduced, who would have a small recurring role throughout the middle of the season. Curtis was very similar to Zack due to their similar interests in dance and music, as well as their smooth-talking speech pattern. He also formed a friendship with Trini's crush Richie. The two once even managed to fight off a group of Putties while they were skating.

When Walter Jones (Zack), Austin St. John (Jason), and Thuy Trang (Trini) left the show (over contract disputes), their characters stopped making new on-screen or face-to-camera shots- simply being shown in their Ranger uniforms, using old footage, or with doubles who were never directly facing the cameras- before they were written off in the two-part "Power Transfer" episode in which their characters were chosen to attend the World Peace Conference. Zack's powers were transferred to Adam Park. Though Jason later returned in Power Rangers Zeo, Turbo: A Power Rangers Movie, and the tenth anniversary special "Forever Red," it was never stated what became of Trini or Zack after the peace conference, although Jones did return to the show in a few episodes in Power Rangers Lost Galaxy and Power Rangers Wild Force mainly doing voicework for monsters and villains.

==== Power Rangers Super Megaforce ====
During the final episode of Power Rangers Super Megaforce - Legendary Battle - the Black Mighty Morphin Power Ranger participates in the eponymous battle alongside other past and present Power Rangers. It is presumed to be Zack wielding the Mastodon Power Coin as Adam is seen fighting as the Green Zeo Ranger. Regardless, Emanuel Jones does not reprise the role for this morphed appearance.

==== Power Rangers Beast Morphers ====
The Black Mighty Morphin Power Ranger makes another appearance for the second season episode of Power Rangers Beast Morphers, Grid Connection. The episode saw Austin St. John reprise the role as Jason Lee Scott, the Red Mighty Morphin Power Ranger. Jason summons the other four core Mighty Morphin Power Rangers and the Dino Thunder rangers to join him and the Dino Charge rangers in battling a resurrected Goldar Maximus. Again, Emanuel Jones did not return; the Black Ranger has no dialogue and remains morphed throughout the appearance so it is unclear if Zack or Adam answered the call.

==== Mighty Morphin Power Rangers: Once and Always ====
For Hasbro PulseCon 2022, Walter Emanuel Jones announced he would reprise the role of Zack to mark the 30th anniversary of the Power Rangers franchise. Mighty Morphin Power Rangers: Once and Always was released on Netflix on April 19, 2023.

In the special, it is revealed that Zack became a Congressman following his time at the Peace Conference. However, when Trini is killed by Robo-Rita - the evil spirit of Rita Repulsa inhabiting a robot body - he steps down to care for Trini's teenage daughter, Minh. Though Minh comes to see "Uncle Zack" as a surrogate father figure, she is openly resentful to Billy, who caused Rita's restoration. Minh becomes vengeful and begins training in the hope of destroying Rita.

One year later, Robo-Rita reappears and captures Tommy, Jason, and Kimberly. She plans to drain their energy to power a time machine that will allow her to contact her past self and alter the timeline in her favor. While Zack and Billy lead the remaining Mighty Morphin' Power Rangers - a team consisting of themselves, Kat and Rocky - to defend Angel Grove and thwart Rita's plan, Minh steals Trini's morpher to join the fight but finds herself unable to use it. Echoing Zordon, Zack counsels her to use her skills to defend life, rather than for revenge.

During the final battle with Robo-Rita, Minh sacrifices herself to save Billy. This action bonds her to the Sabre-Toothed Tiger Power Coin, which saves her and allows her to morph into the Yellow Mighty Morphin' Power Ranger. Zack uses the Power Axe's cannon mode to destroy Rita once and for all, saying Trini's name before delivering the final blow.

=== Film ===
==== Power Rangers (2017) ====
Ludi Lin as Zack in 2017 film Power Rangers.

Zack appears in the 2017 film reboot, played by Chinese-Canadian actor Ludi Lin. He is initially introduced as a school truant with an apparent need for adrenaline, willing to attempt the team's more extreme stunts, such as jumping over a chasm. In the course of the film, it is revealed that he lives in a mobile home park with his ill mother, and Zack is her only carer. Zack is bilingual, speaking English, and using Mandarin Chinese to communicate with his mother. He is the first Ranger to try and pilot his zord, despite being told that it is only controllable once they have morphed, taking the Mastodon on a run through the hills. He rallies in time to assist the team in facing Rita in the final battle.

=== Comics ===
==== Mighty Morphin Power Rangers: Pink ====
Kimberly is the main character in this comic book mini series published by Boom! Studios. The series is a modern remake but also serves as a continuation from Kimberly's exit in the third season of Mighty Morphin Power Rangers. Kimberly needs to rescue a French town under siege from Goldar. She seeks help from Zordon who uses the Sword of Light to activate the latent pink energy within her. Kimberly then teleports to Zack and Trini in South America for their help. Zordon uses the Sword of Light to share Kimberly's power with them. Zack once again becomes the black ranger. It is also revealed that Zack and Trini are in a relationship.

=== Other appearances ===
==== Power/Rangers (2015 short film) ====
In Power/Rangers Zack Taylor (played by Gichi Gamba), in this much darker satirical reimagining, in this timeline the Machine Empire defeats the Power Rangers and destroys the Megazord in battle, Earth's governments negotiate a truce with the Machine Empire and the Power Rangers are disbanded. Zack an insatiable action junkie and "Hip Hop Kido" workout instructor who became a Machine Empire enforcer (seen taking down the North Korean Kim and his goons personally), he also has a relationship with Divatox and Scorpina and has also become a cocaine addict, he is murdered by Rita Repulsa disguised as Kimberly Hart.

== Reception ==
The choice of color for the Black Ranger (Zack Taylor) and Yellow Ranger (Trini Kwan) have been a source of criticism, due to the belief these colors are representations of their racial backgrounds. There are many parodies illustrating the perceived inherent racism of the show. According to the producers, this was not noticed until the tenth episode of Mighty Morphin Power Rangers. Walter Emanuel Jones later claimed in 2025 that he chose the suit himself because “[he] thought it looked cool”. While he and Thuy Trang did notice the racial color connection with themselves and their suits, they felt that it ultimately did not matter as they expressed hope that their characters would at least entertain the audience. This proved to be true as Jones stated that he was often told how much of a positive influence he was with fans.
