= List of Mighty Morphin Power Rangers home video releases =

Shout! Factory's 2012 American release cover art for the complete series

This is a list of VHS and DVD releases for Mighty Morphin Power Rangers from regions 1, 2, and 4.

== Region 1 (United States, Canada) ==
=== United States ===
==== VHS releases ====
Between 1994 and 1995, Saban Home Entertainment, in association with PolyGram Video, released select episodes from the first two seasons of the show on single episode VHS tapes. In 1996, Saban Home Entertainment, in association with WarnerVision Entertainment, released three compilation VHS tapes of "All Time Favorites". 20th Century Fox Home Entertainment also released compilation VHS tapes as well in 2000.

Release name	Release date	Publisher	Stock number	Notes	Ref.
"Day of the Dumpster"	September 13, 1994	Saban Home Entertainment/PolyGram Video	42001-3	Contains the following previews at the beginning: VR Troopers; Mighty Morphin Power Rangers (featuring promos for: Day of the Dumpster (1993), High Five (1993), Food Fight (1993), Happy Birthday, Zack (1993), No Clowning Around (1993), Out of Control (1993), Jason's Battle (1993), The Rescue (1993), Eclipsing Megazord (1993), Breaking The Spell (1993), The Wanna-Be Ranger (1994), Putty On The Brain (1994), Bloom Of Doom (1994)) and a promo for: Mighty Morphin Power Rangers books and soundtracks Mighty Morphin Power Rangers Fan Club promo Special interview with Jason	
"High Five"	September 13, 1994	Saban Home Entertainment/PolyGram Video	42002-3	Contains the following previews at the beginning: VR Troopers; Mighty Morphin Power Rangers (featuring promos for: Day of the Dumpster (1993), High Five (1993), Food Fight (1993), Happy Birthday, Zack (1993), No Clowning Around (1993), Out of Control (1993), Jason's Battle (1993), The Rescue (1993), Eclipsing Megazord (1993), Breaking The Spell (1993), The Wanna-Be Ranger (1994), Putty On The Brain (1994), Bloom Of Doom (1994)) and a promo for: Mighty Morphin Power Rangers books and soundtracks Mighty Morphin Power Rangers Fan Club promo Special interview with Trini	
"Food Fight"	September 13, 1994	Saban Home Entertainment/PolyGram Video	42003-3	Contains the following previews at the beginning: VR Troopers; Mighty Morphin Power Rangers (featuring promos for: Day of the Dumpster (1993), High Five (1993), Food Fight (1993), Happy Birthday, Zack (1993), No Clowning Around (1993), Out of Control (1993), Jason's Battle (1993), The Rescue (1993), Eclipsing Megazord (1993), Breaking The Spell (1993), The Wanna-Be Ranger (1994), Putty On The Brain (1994), Bloom Of Doom (1994)) and a promo for: Mighty Morphin Power Rangers books and soundtracks Mighty Morphin Power Rangers Fan Club promo Special interview with Billy	
"Happy Birthday Zack"	September 13, 1994	Saban Home Entertainment/PolyGram Video	42004-3	Contains the following previews at the beginning: VR Troopers; Mighty Morphin Power Rangers (featuring promos for: Day of the Dumpster (1993), High Five (1993), Food Fight (1993), Happy Birthday, Zack (1993), No Clowning Around (1993), Out of Control (1993), Jason's Battle (1993), The Rescue (1993), Eclipsing Megazord (1993), Breaking The Spell (1993), The Wanna-Be Ranger (1994), Putty on the Brain (1994), Bloom of Doom (1994)) and a promo for: Mighty Morphin Power Rangers books and soundtracks Mighty Morphin Power Rangers Fan Club promo Special interview with Zack	
"No Clowning Around"	September 13, 1994	Saban Home Entertainment/PolyGram Video	42005-3	Contains the following previews at the beginning: VR Troopers; Mighty Morphin Power Rangers (featuring promos for: Day of the Dumpster (1993), High Five (1993), Food Fight (1993), Happy Birthday, Zack (1993), No Clowning Around (1993), Out of Control (1993), Jason's Battle (1993), The Rescue (1993), Eclipsing Megazord (1993), Breaking The Spell (1993), The Wanna-Be Ranger (1994), Putty On The Brain (1994), Bloom Of Doom (1994)) and a promo for: Mighty Morphin Power Rangers books and soundtracks Mighty Morphin Power Rangers Fan Club promo Special interview with Kimberly	
"Green with Evil, Part I: Out of Control"	September 13, 1994	Saban Home Entertainment/PolyGram Video	42006-3	Contains the following previews at the beginning: VR Troopers; Mighty Morphin Power Rangers (featuring promos for: Day of the Dumpster (1993), High Five (1993), Food Fight (1993), Happy Birthday, Zack (1993), No Clowning Around (1993), Out of Control (1993), Jason's Battle (1993), The Rescue (1993), Eclipsing Megazord (1993), Breaking The Spell (1993), The Wanna-Be Ranger (1994), Putty On The Brain (1994), Bloom Of Doom (1994)) and a promo for: Mighty Morphin Power Rangers books and soundtracks Mighty Morphin Power Rangers Fan Club promo Special interview with Tommy and Friends	
"Green with Evil, Part II: Jason's Battle"	September 13, 1994	Saban Home Entertainment/PolyGram Video	42007-3		
"Green with Evil, Part III: The Rescue"	September 13, 1994	Saban Home Entertainment/PolyGram Video	42008-3		
"Green with Evil, Part IV: Eclipsing Megazord"	September 13, 1994	Saban Home Entertainment/PolyGram Video	42009-3		
"Green with Evil, Part V: Breaking the Spell"	September 13, 1994	Saban Home Entertainment/PolyGram Video	42010-3		
"The Wanna-Be Ranger"	September 21, 1994	Saban Home Entertainment/PolyGram Video	42011-3	Contains the following previews at the beginning: Mighty Morphin Power Rangers: Alpha's Magical Christmas; Mighty Morphin Power Rangers: Karate Club: Level 1 VR Troopers and a promo for: Mighty Morphin Power Rangers books and soundtracks Mighty Morphin Power Rangers Fan Club promo Special feature at the end of the series: Ron Wasserman - I Will Win and a music video	
"Putty on the Brain"	September 21, 1994	Saban Home Entertainment/PolyGram Video	42012-3	Contains the following previews at the beginning: Mighty Morphin Power Rangers: Alpha's Magical Christmas; Mighty Morphin Power Rangers: Karate Club: Level 1 VR Troopers and a promo for: Mighty Morphin Power Rangers books and soundtracks Mighty Morphin Power Rangers Fan Club promo Special feature at the end of the series: Ron Wasserman - We Need A Hero and a music video	
"Bloom of Doom"	September 21, 1994	Saban Home Entertainment/PolyGram Video	42013-3	Contains the following previews at the beginning: Mighty Morphin Power Rangers: Alpha's Magical Christmas; Mighty Morphin Power Rangers: Karate Club: Level 1 VR Troopers and a promo for: Mighty Morphin Power Rangers books and soundtracks Mighty Morphin Power Rangers Fan Club promo Special feature at the end of the series: Ron Wasserman - Fight and a music video	
"Alpha's Magical Christmas"	October 19, 1994	Saban Home Entertainment/PolyGram Video	42014-3	Contains the following previews at the beginning: Mighty Morphin Power Rangers (featuring promos for: Day of the Dumpster (1993), High Five (1993), Food Fight (1993), Happy Birthday, Zack (1993), No Clowning Around (1993), Out of Control (1993), Jason's Battle (1993), The Rescue (1993), Eclipsing Megazord (1993), Breaking The Spell (1993), The Wanna-Be Ranger (1994), Putty On The Brain (1994), Bloom Of Doom (1994)); Mighty Morphin Power Rangers: Karate Club: Level 1 A Christmas Reunion and a promo for: Mighty Morphin Power Rangers books and soundtracks Mighty Morphin Power Rangers Fan Club promo Additional notes Is a "direct-to-video" special that was never televised.	
The White Ranger Series: Volume 1: "Goldar's Vice-Versa"	March 28, 1995	Saban Home Entertainment/PolyGram Video	42029-3	Contains the following previews at the beginning: Mighty Morphin Power Rangers: Karate Club: Level 1 (1994); Mighty Morphin Power Rangers: The Movie (1995) (sneak peek) and a promo for: VR Troopers books and soundtracks Mighty Morphin Power Rangers books and soundtracks (The White Album); Mighty Morphin Power Rangers Fan Club promo Mighty Morphin Power Rangers foods Special feature at the end of the series: Ron Wasserman - 5-4-1 and a music video	
The White Ranger Series: Volume 2: "Rocky Just Wants to Have Fun"	March 28, 1995	Saban Home Entertainment/PolyGram Video	42031-3	Contains the following previews at the beginning: Mighty Morphin Power Rangers: Karate Club: Level 1 (1994); Mighty Morphin Power Rangers: The Movie (1995) (sneak peek) and a promo for: VR Troopers books and soundtracks Mighty Morphin Power Rangers books and soundtracks (The White Album); Mighty Morphin Power Rangers Fan Club promo Mighty Morphin Power Rangers foods Special feature at the end of the series: Ron Wasserman - Zords and a music video	
The White Ranger Series: Volume 3: "Where There's Smoke, There's Fire"	March 28, 1995	Saban Home Entertainment/PolyGram Video	42030-3	Contains the following previews at the beginning: Mighty Morphin Power Rangers: Karate Club: Level 1 (1994); Mighty Morphin Power Rangers: The Movie (1995) (sneak peek) and a promo for: VR Troopers books and soundtracks Mighty Morphin Power Rangers books and soundtracks (The White Album); Mighty Morphin Power Rangers Fan Club promo Mighty Morphin Power Rangers foods Special feature at the end of the series: Ron Wasserman - White Ranger Tiger Power and a music video	
The Power Rangers Girl Series: Volume 1: "Two for One"	July 5, 1995	Saban Home Entertainment/PolyGram Video	42032-3	Contains the following previews at the beginning: Mighty Morphin Power Rangers (featuring ones for: The Wanna-Be Ranger (1994), Putty On The Brain (1994), Bloom Of Doom (1994), Where There's Smoke There's Fire (1994), Rocky Just Wants To Have Fun (1994), Goldar's Vice-Versa (1994)); VR Troopers (1994); Mighty Morphin Power Rangers: The Movie (1995) and a promo for: Mighty Morphin Power Rangers books and soundtracks (The White Album); VR Troopers books and soundtracks	
The Power Rangers Girl Series: Volume 2: "Forever Friends"	July 5, 1995	Saban Home Entertainment/PolyGram Video	42033-3	Contains the following previews at the beginning: Mighty Morphin Power Rangers (featuring ones for: The Wanna-Be Ranger (1994), Putty On The Brain (1994), Bloom Of Doom (1994), Where There's Smoke There's Fire (1994), Rocky Just Wants To Have Fun (1994), Goldar's Vice-Versa (1994)); VR Troopers (1994); Mighty Morphin Power Rangers: The Movie (1995) and a promo for: Mighty Morphin Power Rangers books and soundtracks (The White Album); VR Troopers books and soundtracks	
"Lord Zedd's Monster Heads: The Greatest Villains of the Mighty Morphin Power Rangers"	August 29, 1995	Saban Home Entertainment/PolyGram Video	42034-3	Contains the following previews at the beginning: Saban Entertainment, Saban Entertainment, We Turn it On (featuring ones for: Mighty Morphin Power Rangers: Morphin Series (1995), Mighty Morphin Power Rangers: Lord Zedd's Monster Heads (1995), Creepy Crawlers (1994), Mighty Morphin Power Rangers: The White Rangers Series (1995), Mighty Morphin Power Rangers: I'm Dreaming of a White Ranger (1995), Mighty Morphin Power Rangers: Alpha's Magical Christmas (1994), Mighty Morphin Power Rangers: Lord Zedd's Holiday Humbug (1995), Mighty Morphin Power Rangers: The Power Rangers Girls Series (1995), Mighty Morphin Power Rangers CD-ROM (1995), Mighty Morphin Power Rangers Fan Club (1994)) and a promo for: Mighty Morphin Power Rangers: The Movie action figures advertisement Additional notes Is a "direct-to-video" special that was never televised.	
Morphin Series: Volume 1: "Lord Zedd Waves"	September 12, 1995	Saban Home Entertainment/PolyGram Video	42040-3	Contains the following previews at the beginning: Saban Entertainment, Saban Entertainment, We Turn it On (featuring ones for: Mighty Morphin Power Rangers: Morphin Series (1995), Mighty Morphin Power Rangers: Lord Zedd's Monster Heads (1995), Creepy Crawlers (1994), Mighty Morphin Power Rangers: The White Rangers Series (1995), Mighty Morphin Power Rangers: I'm Dreaming of a White Ranger (1995), Mighty Morphin Power Rangers: Alpha's Magical Christmas (1994), Mighty Morphin Power Rangers: Lord Zedd's Holiday Humbug (1995), Mighty Morphin Power Rangers: The Power Rangers Girls Series (1995), Mighty Morphin Power Rangers CD-ROM (1995), Mighty Morphin Power Rangers Fan Club (1994)) and a promo for: Mighty Morphin Power Rangers Shogun MegaFalconzord action figures advertisement	
Morphin Series: Volume 2: "When is a Ranger Not a Ranger?"	September 12, 1995	Saban Home Entertainment/PolyGram Video	42039-3	Contains the following previews at the beginning: Saban Entertainment, Saban Entertainment, We Turn it On (featuring ones for: Mighty Morphin Power Rangers: Morphin Series (1995), Mighty Morphin Power Rangers: Lord Zedd's Monster Heads (1995), Creepy Crawlers (1994), Mighty Morphin Power Rangers: The White Rangers Series (1995), Mighty Morphin Power Rangers: I'm Dreaming of a White Ranger (1995), Mighty Morphin Power Rangers: Alpha's Magical Christmas (1994), Mighty Morphin Power Rangers: Lord Zedd's Holiday Humbug (1995), Mighty Morphin Power Rangers: The Power Rangers Girls Series (1995), Mighty Morphin Power Rangers CD-ROM (1995), Mighty Morphin Power Rangers Fan Club (1994)) and a promo for: Mighty Morphin Power Rangers Ninja MegaFalconzord action figures advertisement	
Morphin Series: Volume 3: "Lights, Camera, Action"	September 12, 1995	Saban Home Entertainment/PolyGram Video	42038-3	Contains the following previews at the beginning: Saban Entertainment, Saban Entertainment, We Turn it On (featuring ones for: Mighty Morphin Power Rangers: Morphin Series (1995), Mighty Morphin Power Rangers: Lord Zedd's Monster Heads (1995), Creepy Crawlers (1994), Mighty Morphin Power Rangers: The White Rangers Series (1995), Mighty Morphin Power Rangers: I'm Dreaming of a White Ranger (1995), Mighty Morphin Power Rangers: Alpha's Magical Christmas (1994), Mighty Morphin Power Rangers: Lord Zedd's Holiday Humbug (1995), Mighty Morphin Power Rangers: The Power Rangers Girls Series (1995), Mighty Morphin Power Rangers CD-ROM (1995), Mighty Morphin Power Rangers Fan Club (1994)) and a promo for: Mighty Morphin Power Rangers Ninja Ultrazord action figures advertisement	
"I'm Dreaming of a White Ranger"	September 12, 1995	Saban Home Entertainment/PolyGram Video	42041-3	Contains the following previews at the beginning: Saban Entertainment, Saban Entertainment, We Turn it On (featuring ones for: Mighty Morphin Power Rangers: Morphin Series (1995), Mighty Morphin Power Rangers: Lord Zedd's Monster Heads (1995), Creepy Crawlers (1994), Mighty Morphin Power Rangers: The White Rangers Series (1995), Mighty Morphin Power Rangers: I'm Dreaming of a White Ranger (1995), Mighty Morphin Power Rangers: Alpha's Magical Christmas (1994), Mighty Morphin Power Rangers: Lord Zedd's Holiday Humbug (1995), Mighty Morphin Power Rangers: The Power Rangers Girls Series (1995), Mighty Morphin Power Rangers CD-ROM (1995), Mighty Morphin Power Rangers Fan Club (1994)) and a promo for: Mighty Morphin Power Rangers Talking Power Rangers and Talking Lord Zedd action figures advertisement Additional notes Features exclusive extra footage and alternate cuts that were not seen in the televised episode or future VHS and DVD releases of this episode.	
All Time Favorites: Volume 1: White Light: The Mini-Series	February 20, 1996	Saban Home Entertainment/PolyGram Video	42046-3	Contains the following previews at the beginning: Mighty Morphin Power Rangers: All-Time Favorites (featuring ones for: Mighty Morphin Power Rangers: Ninja Quest: The Mini-Series (1995), White Light: The Mini-Series (1994), The Good, the Bad, the Stupid: The Misadventures of Bulk and Skull (1995)); Mighty Morphin Power Rangers Karate Club: The White Ranger Kata (1996); Mighty Morphin Power Rangers: Morphin Series (1995). At the end of the tape: a promo for: Mighty Morphin Power Rangers Message PSA; Mighty Morphin Power Rangers CD-ROM; Mighty Morphin Power Rangers books and soundtracks (The White Album); Power Rangers Zeo Zeo Rangers action figures advertisement Additional notes Features exclusive extra footage of Bulk and Skull that has never been televised or included with future VHS and DVD releases.	
All Time Favorites: Volume 2: Ninja Quest: The Mini-Series	February 20, 1996	Saban Home Entertainment/PolyGram Video	42045-3		
All Time Favorites: Volume 3: The Good, the Bad, the Stupid: The Misadventures of Bulk and Skull	February 20, 1996	Saban Home Entertainment/PolyGram Video	42044-3	Contains the following previews at the beginning: Mighty Morphin Power Rangers: All-Time Favorites (featuring ones for: Mighty Morphin Power Rangers: Ninja Quest: The Mini-Series (1995), White Light: The Mini-Series (1994), The Good, the Bad, the Stupid: The Misadventures of Bulk and Skull (1995)); Mighty Morphin Power Rangers Karate Club: The White Ranger Kata (1996); Mighty Morphin Power Rangers: Morphin Series (1995). At the end of the tape: a promo for: Mighty Morphin Power Rangers Message PSA; Mighty Morphin Power Rangers CD-ROM; Mighty Morphin Power Rangers books and soundtracks (The White Album); Power Rangers Zeo Zeo Rangers action figures advertisement Additional notes Is a "direct-to-video" special that was never televised.	
Power Rangers: Power Playback: Classic Ranger Edition: Black Ranger Adventure	November 28, 2000	Fox Home Entertainment/Fox Kids Video	2000056	Contains "Happy Birthday, Zack" and "Putty on the Brain" from seasons 1 and 2 of Mighty Morphin Power Rangers.	
Power Rangers: Power Playback: Classic Ranger Edition: Pink Ranger Adventure	November 28, 2000	Fox Home Entertainment/Fox Kids Video	2000055	Contains "No Clowning Around" and "Bloom of Doom" from seasons 1 and 2 of Mighty Morphin Power Rangers.	
Power Rangers: Power Playback: Classic Ranger Edition: Blue Ranger Adventure	November 28, 2000	Fox Home Entertainment/Fox Kids Video	2000058	Contains "Food Fight" and "Blue Ranger Gone Bad" from seasons 1 and 2 of Mighty Morphin Power Rangers.	
Power Rangers: Power Playback: Classic Ranger Edition: Yellow Ranger Adventure	November 28, 2000	Fox Home Entertainment/Fox Kids Video	2000057	Contains "High Five" and "Forever Friends" from seasons 1 and 2 of Mighty Morphin Power Rangers.	
Power Rangers: Power Playback: Classic Ranger Edition: Red Ranger Adventure	November 28, 2000	Fox Home Entertainment/Fox Kids Video	2000054	Contains "Day of the Dumpster" and "The Wanna-Be Ranger" from seasons 1 and 2 of Mighty Morphin Power Rangers.	
Power Rangers: Power Playback: Classic Ranger Edition: White Ranger Adventure	November 28, 2000	Fox Home Entertainment/Fox Kids Video	2001000	Contains "White Light" from season 2 of Mighty Morphin Power Rangers.	
Power Rangers: Holiday Special	November 28, 2000	Fox Home Entertainment/Fox Kids Video	2000996	Contains "A Season to Remember", "I'm Dreaming of a White Ranger" and "Alpha's Magical Christmas".	
Power Rangers: Red Alert	2002	Buena Vista Home Entertainment		Contains "Two Heads are Better than One" from season 1.	

==== Spin-off VHS releases ====
Release name	Release date	Publisher	Stock Number	Notes	REF
Mighty Morphin Power Rangers: Official Fan Club: The Official Fan Club Video!	September 14, 1994	Saban Home Entertainment		Contains the following previews at the beginning: VR Troopers; Mighty Morphin Power Rangers (featuring promos for: Day of the Dumpster (1993), High Five (1993), Food Fight (1993), Happy Birthday, Zack (1993), No Clowning Around (1993), Out of Control (1993), Jason's Battle(1993), The Rescue (1993), Eclipsing Megazord (1993), Breaking The Spell (1993), The Wanna-Be Ranger (1994), Putty On The Brain (1994), Bloom Of Doom (1994)) and a promo for: Mighty Morphin Power Rangers books and soundtracks Mighty Morphin Power Rangers Fan Club promo Additional notes VHS was released exclusively to members of the official fan club through a mail-away membership kit upon joining. Was not available for the general public's viewing until the complete series DVD box set was released in 2012.	
The Official Mighty Morphin Power Rangers: Karate Club: Level 1	November 23, 1994	Saban Home Entertainment	42028-3	Contains the following previews at the beginning: Mighty Morphin Power Rangers (featuring promos for: Day of the Dumpster (1993), High Five (1993), Food Fight (1993), Happy Birthday, Zack (1993), No Clowning Around (1993), Out of Control (1993), Jason's Battle (1993), The Rescue (1993), Eclipsing Megazord (1993), Breaking The Spell (1993), The Wanna-Be Ranger (1994), Putty On The Brain (1994), Bloom Of Doom (1994)); VR Troopers (1994) and a promo for: Mighty Morphin Power Rangers books and soundtracks Mighty Morphin Power Rangers Fan Club promo Mighty Morphin Power Rangers foods Additional notes Is sometimes retroactively referred to as The Green Ranger Kata by fans and on the Power Rangers Legacy DVD box set to better differentiate it from the later released The White Ranger Kata VHS.	
Mighty Morphin Power Rangers Karate Club: The White Ranger Kata	January 30, 1996	Saban Home Entertainment	42043-3	Contains the following previews at the beginning: Mighty Morphin Power Rangers: All-Time Favorites (featuring ones for: Mighty Morphin Power Rangers: Ninja Quest: The Mini-Series (1995), White Light: The Mini-Series (1994), The Good, the Bad, the Stupid: The Misadventures of Bulk and Skull (1995)); Mighty Morphin Power Rangers Karate Club: Level 1 (1994); Mighty Morphin Power Rangers: Morphin Series (1995). At the end of the tape: a promo for: Mighty Morphin Power Rangers Message PSA; Mighty Morphin Power Rangers CD-ROM; Mighty Morphin Power Rangers books and soundtracks (The White Album); Mighty Morphin Alien Rangers Alien Rangers and Battle Borgs action figures advertisement	
Mighty Morphin Power Rangers Live: The World Tour Live-on-Stage	March 19, 1996	Saban Home Entertainment	42042-3	Contains the following previews at the beginning: Mighty Morphin Power Rangers: All-Time Favorites (featuring ones for: Mighty Morphin Power Rangers: Ninja Quest: The Mini-Series (1995), White Light: The Mini-Series (1994), The Good, the Bad, the Stupid: The Misadventures of Bulk and Skull (1995)); Mighty Morphin Power Rangers Karate Club: The White Ranger Kata (1996); Mighty Morphin Power Rangers: Morphin Series (1995). At the end of the tape: a promo for: Mighty Morphin Power Rangers Message PSA; Mighty Morphin Power Rangers CD-ROM; Mighty Morphin Power Rangers books and soundtracks (The White Album); Mighty Morphin Alien Rangers Alien Rangers and Battle Borgs action figures advertisement	

==== Complete sets (DVD) ====
In March 2012, Shout! Factory obtained the rights to distribute the first 17 seasons of the Power Rangers series on DVD, beginning with Mighty Morphin Power Rangers. In July 2012, they first released the complete set at San Diego Comic-Con in a 19 disc set of all three seasons of Mighty Mighty Morphin Power Rangers that included the 10 episode mini-series, Mighty Morphin Alien Rangers. In August of that same year, they released the first season of the series to Time Life bundled with a Red Ranger action figure, as well as the 19 disc complete set (minus the Comic-Con exclusive paper wrapper) bundled together with the 21 disc Power Rangers Seasons 4-7 set and Red Ranger action figure. In November 2012 they released the 19 disc complete set for a third time to wider retail along with eventual individual releases of both Season 1 and Season 2 (each season being split into two volumes). In July 2013, they released the entire third season on DVD without the Alien Rangers mini-series (which got its own separate release in September 2013). After working out a deal with Lionsgate for access to season 18 through 20, a limited edition 98 disc set entitled Power Rangers: Legacy, which consist of the complete first 20 seasons of the Power Rangers franchise including the three seasons from Mighty Morphin Power Rangers, was scheduled for a December 3, 2013 release, but due to manufacturing errors on the packaging the set was postponed and was instead released on January 2, 2014. In March 2015 they released a complete first season set exclusively to Wal-Mart that features an alternate cover from the Time Life complete first season set. The complete second season set was also released exclusively to Wal-Mart on the same day. In October 2016 they released a new version of the complete set featuring alternate cover art from the 2012 releases. In March 2017 they released a season one and two bundled set exclusively to Best Buy. In August 2018 a new version of the complete set released featuring a "25th Anniversary" Steelbook and included Mighty Morphin Power Rangers: The Movie on Blu-ray (the rest of the set is still DVD). In April 2019 a new version of the complete first season set is scheduled to release featuring a limited Steelbook. In June 2019 a new version of the complete second season set is scheduled to release featuring a limited Steelbook. In August 2019 a new version of the complete third season set is scheduled to release featuring a limited Steelbook and including the 10 episode mini-series, Mighty Morphin Alien Rangers.

DVD title	# of disc(s)	Year	# of episodes	DVD release	Notes
Mighty Morphin Power Rangers Season One	6	1993-1994	60	August 13, 2012 (Time Life Exclusive Complete); March 10, 2015 (Wal-Mart Exclusive Complete)	The Time Life version has a red background cover similar to the retail release of Season 1, Volume 1 and came bundled with a Red Ranger action figure. The Wal-Mart version has a blue background cover.
Mighty Morphin Power Rangers: Season One (Limited Steelbook Edition)	6	1993-1994	60	April 16, 2019	Aside from the new limited Steelbook packaging this set is identical to the previous Complete Season releases of Season 1.
Mighty Morphin Power Rangers: Season Two	6	1994-1995	52	March 10, 2015 (Wal-Mart Exclusive Complete)	
Mighty Morphin Power Rangers: Season Two (Limited Steelbook Edition)	6	1994-1995	52	June 11, 2019	Aside from the new limited Steelbook packaging this set is identical to the previous Complete Season release of Season 2.
Mighty Morphin Power Rangers: Season Three	4	1995	33	July 2, 2013	
Mighty Morphin Power Rangers: Season Three (Limited Steelbook Edition)	5	1995	43	August 13, 2019	Aside from the new limited Steelbook packaging this set is almost identical to the previous Complete Season release of Season 3. The only other difference is the inclusion of the 10 episode mini-series, Mighty Morphin Alien Rangers, which previously sold separately as its own standalone release.
Mighty Morphin Power Rangers: Seasons 1 and 2	12	1993-1995	112	March 7, 2017 (Best Buy Exclusive)	A bundled set re-release of seasons one and two of Mighty Morphin Power Rangers. Features cover art similar to the 2012 retail release of Mighty Morphin Power Rangers: The Complete Series, but uses DVD cases identical to the 2016 re-release of the same set.
Mighty Morphin Power Rangers: The Complete Series	19 (All releases)	1993-1996	155	July 11, 2012 (Comic-Con Exclusive); August 13, 2012 (Time Life Exclusive Seasons 1-7 Deluxe Set); November 20, 2012 (Wide retail release); October 18, 2016 (Wide retail re-release); March 30, 2021 (Wide retail 3rd release)	Consists of seasons one, two and three of Mighty Morphin Power Rangers along with the 10 episode mini-series, Mighty Morphin Alien Rangers. The set also includes two disc of bonus materials that includes "Lord Zedd's Monster Head" and "Alpha's Magical Christmas", other bonus materials include are MMPR Fan Club Video, the live world tour, and an exclusive featurette with the cast and crew. It also includes an exclusive interview with the casting director and the cast, as well as The Fans Power Up featurette. Additional notes All three releases from 2012 are identical except for a few minor details external to the set itself. The Comic-Con version has an extra paper wrapper on the outside of the set stating that it was from Comic-Con. The Time Life set lacks the Comic-Con wrapper, but came bundled with the Power Rangers Season 4-7 (Zeo, Turbo, In Space & Lost Galaxy) set and a Red Ranger action figure. The 2012 retail release lacks the Comic-Con wrapper and does not come bundled with either the Season 4-7 set or the action figure. The 2016 retail release features new cover art and DVD case packaging for the set, but is otherwise considered identical to the previous 2012 releases. The 2021 reprinting of this set omits the booklet included with previous versions.
Mighty Morphin Power Rangers: The Complete Series (25 Anniversary Limited Steelbook Edition)	20	1993-1996	155	August 7, 2018	Consists of seasons one, two and three of Mighty Morphin Power Rangers along with the 10 episode mini-series, Mighty Morphin Alien Rangers on DVD. The set also includes two DVD discs of bonus materials that includes "Lord Zedd's Monster Head" and "Alpha's Magical Christmas", other bonus materials include are MMPR Fan Club Video, the live world tour, and an exclusive featurette with the cast and crew. It also includes an exclusive interview with the casting director and the cast, as well as The Fans Power Up featurette. As one added bonus to this set (not included in previous set releases), Mighty Morphin Power Rangers: The Movie is included on an extra Blu-ray disc. Additional notes The 2018 "25th Anniversary" Steelbook retail release features new packaging for the set and includes Mighty Morphin Power Rangers: The Movie on an extra Blu-ray disc, but is otherwise considered identical to the previous 2012 and 2016 DVD releases. Shout! Factory does not own the DVD or Blu-ray rights to Mighty Morphin Power Rangers: The Movie and had to work out a deal with 20th Century Fox to include the movie in this set. A limited lithograph poster, using the artwork of the 2016 release of the Mighty Morphin Power Rangers box set, was given to those who preordered from Shout! Factory's website.
Power Rangers: Legacy	98	1993-2013	767	January 2, 2014	Consists of the first 20 seasons of the franchise, including all three seasons of Mighty Morphin Power Rangers, packaged inside several DVD wallet tins resembling the show's various Power Coins and housed in a display base resembling the Mighty Morphin Red Ranger helmet. The set includes every bonus disc released in each box set Shout! Factory has released as well as a bonus 6th disc not released anywhere else, as well as a 100-page booklet. Only 2,000 were made and each is individually numbered. The set also contains cardboard placeholders reserving slots for the first two Power Ranger films, Mighty Morphin Power Rangers: The Movie and Turbo: A Power Ranger Movie (neither included due to DVD rights belonging to 20th Century Fox at the time). This was so the owner could later include their own copies of the movies (purchased separately) in the set if so desired. Additional notes Shout! Factory does not own the DVD rights to season 18 onward and had to work out a deal with Lionsgate to include those seasons in this set. Due to the manufacturing error postponement four lithograph posters, limited to only 1,000 sets and using the artwork of the smaller Shout! Factory Power Ranger season box sets, was given to those who preordered.

==== Volume DVDs ====
In August 2012, Shout! Factory began releasing two volume sets of the first two seasons of Mighty Morphin Power Rangers. In September 2014 Shout! Factory released the "Green with Evil" saga from season 1 on a single volume. In February 2017 Shout! Factory released a "Best of Blue" DVD on a single volume featuring episodes where Billy the Blue Ranger is the main focus.

DVD title	# of disc(s)	Year	# of episodes	DVD release	Note
Mighty Morphin Power Rangers: Season 1, Volume 1	3	1993-1994	30	August 21, 2012	Consists of the first 30 episodes of season 1.
Mighty Morphin Power Rangers: Season 1, Volume 2	3	1993-1994	30	November 20, 2012	Consists of the remaining 30 episodes of season 1.
Mighty Morphin Power Rangers: Season 2, Volume 1	3	1994-1995	26	February 26, 2013	Consists of the first 26 episodes of season 2.
Mighty Morphin Power Rangers: Season 2, Volume 2	3	1994-1995	26	May 28, 2013	Consists of the remaining 26 episodes of season 2.
Mighty Morphin Power Rangers: Green with Evil	1	1993	5	September 23, 2014	Consists of all five episodes of "Green with Evil" from season 1.
Mighty Morphin Power Rangers: Best of Blue	1	1993-1995	6	February 28, 2017	Consists of six episodes from season 1 and season 2 where Billy is the main focus. "Peace, Love and Woe", "Dark Warrior", "Switching Places", "Something Fishy", "Grumble Bee" and "Blue Ranger Gone Bad"

==== Compilation DVDs ====
In April 2003, Buena Vista Home Entertainment released a compilation DVD that consisted of 8 episodes, two from Mighty Morphin Power Rangers, two from Power Rangers in Space, one from Power Rangers Lost Galaxy, two from Power Rangers Lightspeed Rescue and the episode "Forever Red" from Power Rangers Wild Force. Starting in 2012, Lionsgate began releasing holiday DVDs based on the newer seasons of Power Rangers Samurai onward. To make these holiday DVDs a more worthwhile purchase for consumers Lionsgate worked out a deal with Shout! Factory to make these into 3 episode compilation DVDs by including extra episodes from seasons prior to Power Rangers Samurai, including episodes from Mighty Morphin Power Rangers.

DVD title	# of disc(s)	Year	# of episodes	DVD release	Notes
The Best of Power Rangers: The Ultimate Rangers	1	1994, 1998, 1999, 2000 and 2002	8	April 1, 2003	Contains "White Light" from season 2 of Mighty Morphin Power Rangers.
Power Rangers Samurai: Monster Bash	1	1993, 1994 and 2011	3	September 11, 2012	Contains "Life's a Masquerade" and "Trick or Treat" from season 1 of Mighty Morphin Power Rangers.
Power Rangers Samurai: Christmas Together, Friends Forever	1	1995, 1996 and 2011	3	October 16, 2012	Contains "I’m Dreaming of a White Ranger" from season 3 of Mighty Morphin Power Rangers.
Power Rangers Super Samurai: A Christmas Wish	1	1994 and 2012	3	October 8, 2013	Contains "Alpha’s Magical Christmas" VHS special and "Friends Forever" from season 2 of Mighty Morphin Power Rangers.

==== Promotional "Day of the Dumpster" DVDs ====
In 2010, Buena Vista Home Entertainment (through Bandai of America) released a DVD that contained the episode "Day of the Dumpster" from the 2010 version of Mighty Morphin Power Rangers. It came bundled with select toys from the Mighty Morphin Power Rangers 2010 toy line. It was also later given out at New York Comic-Con by Saban Brands after their repurchase of the franchise. The New York Comic-Con version is slightly unique in that it features a sticker on the DVD advertising Power Rangers Samurai. To date this is the only episode from the 2010 version of Mighty Morphin Power Rangers to see a DVD release. In 2010, Saban Brands also released a DVD that contained the 1993 version of "Day of the Dumpster". Limited to only 5,000 copies, the DVD was only given out at San Diego Comic-Con and Power Morphicon.

DVD title	# of disc(s)	Year	# of episodes	DVD release	Notes
Mighty Morphin Power Rangers	1	2010	1	2010	Contains the 2010 version of "Day of the Dumpster" from Mighty Morphin Power Rangers. Available in select toys from the 2010 Mighty Morphin Power Rangers toy line and at New York Comic-Con. The New York Comic-Con version features an advertisement sticker for Power Rangers Samurai.
Mighty Morphin Power Rangers Original Pilot Episode	1	1993	1	2010	Contains the 1993 version of "Day of the Dumpster" from Mighty Morphin Power Rangers. Limited to 5,000 copies. Available only at San Diego Comic-Con and Power Morphicon.

=== Canada DVD release ===
DVD title	# of disc(s)	Year	# of episodes	DVD release	Notes
Mighty Morphin Power Rangers: The Complete Series	19	1993-1996	155	August 13, 2012 (Time Life Exclusive Seasons 1-7 Deluxe Set)	Consists of all three seasons of Mighty Morphin Power Rangers plus Mighty Morphin Alien Rangers, as well as the same bonus materials as the US version, including being bundled with the Power Rangers Season 4-7 set and the Red Ranger action figure.

== Region 2 (UK, France, Germany) ==
=== UK VHS releases ===
Release name	Release date	Classifaction	Publisher	Format	Language	Subtitles	Notes	REF
"Day of the Dumpster" and "High Five" (1)	6 April 1994	PG	PolyGram Video	PAL	English	-		
"Teamwork" and "A Pressing Engagement" (2)	6 April 1994	PG	PolyGram Video	PAL	English	-		
"Different Drum" and "Food Fight" (3)	6 April 1994	U	PolyGram Video	PAL	English	-		
"Big Sisters" and "Switching Places" (4)	26 September 1994	PG	PolyGram Video	PAL	English	-		
"I, Eye Guy" and "For Whom the Bell Trolls" (5)	7 November 1994	U	PolyGram Video	PAL	English	-		
"Happy Birthday, Zack" and "No Clowning Around" (6)	7 November 1994	PG	PolyGram Video	PAL	English	-		
"Power Ranger Punks" and "Love, Peace & Woe" (Tesco Exclusive)	21 November 1994	PG	PolyGram Video	PAL	English	-		
"Dark Warrior" and "Foul Play in the Sky" (7)	10 January 1995	PG	PolyGram Video	PAL	English	-		
"Green with Evil" Parts 1-3 (8)	13 February 1995	PG	PolyGram Video	PAL	English	-		
"Green with Evil" Parts 4 and 5 (9)	13 February 1995	PG	PolyGram Video	PAL	English	-		
"The Trouble with Shellshock" and "Itsy Bitsy Spider" (10)	27 March 1995	PG	PolyGram Video	PAL	English	-		
"The Spit Flower" and "Life's a Masquerade" (11)	1 March 1995	PG	PolyGram Video	PAL	English	-		
"Gung Ho!" and "Wheel of Misfortune" (12)	3 July 1995	PG	PolyGram Video	PAL	English	-		
"Island of Illusion" (13)	3 July 1995	U	PolyGram Video	PAL	English	-		
"Calamity Kimberly" and "The Yolks on You" (Woolworths Exclusive)	Unknown	PG	PolyGram Video	PAL	English	-		
"The Green Candle" (14)	7 August 1995	PG	PolyGram Video	PAL	English	-		
"Birds of a Feather" & "Clean-Up Club" (15)	7 August 1995	PG	PolyGram Video	PAL	English	-		
"A Bad Reflection on You" & "Doomsday" (16)	11 September 1995	PG	PolyGram Video	PAL	English	-		
Series Two: Volume One - "White Light"	9 October 1995	PG	PolyGram Video	PAL	English	-		
Series Two: Volume Two - "Two for One" & "Opposites Attract" (Magnet Brain)	9 October 1995	PG	PolyGram Video	PAL	English	-		
Series Two: Volume Three - "Lord Zedd's Monster Mash" & "A Monster of Global Proportions"	6 November 1995	PG	PolyGram Video	PAL	English	-		
Series Two: Volume Four - "Zedd Waves" & "Goldar's Vice-Versa" & "Blue Ranger Gone Bad" & "Best Man for the Job"	6 November 1995	PG	PolyGram Video	PAL	English	-		
Mighty Morph'n Power Rangers Karate Club: The Official Morph'n Karate Club	6 November 1995	PG	PolyGram Video	PAL	English	-		
"Alpha's Magical Christmas"	13 November 1995	—N/a	PolyGram Video	PAL	English	-		
"I'm Dreaming of a White Ranger"	4 December 1995	U	PolyGram Video	PAL	English	-		
"Wild West Rangers" (Woolworth Exclusive)	Unknown	PG	PolyGram Video	PAL	English	-		
"Ninja Quest"	13 May 1996	PG	PolyGram Video	PAL	English	-		
"A Friend in Need"	13 May 1996	PG	PolyGram Video	PAL	English	-		
Classic Ranger Edition: Red Ranger Adventure	12 May 2003	PG	Fox Kids Video; Buena Vista Home Entertainment	PAL	English	-		
Classic Ranger Edition: Yellow Ranger Adventure	12 May 2003	PG	Fox Kids Video; Buena Vista Home Entertainment	PAL	English	-		
Classic Ranger Edition: Black Ranger Adventure	12 May 2003	PG	Fox Kids Video; Buena Vista Home Entertainment	PAL	English	-		
Classic Ranger Edition: White Ranger Adventure	12 May 2003	PG	Fox Kids Video; Buena Vista Home Entertainment	PAL	English	-		
Classic Ranger Edition: Pink Ranger Adventure	12 May 2003	PG	Fox Kids Video; Buena Vista Home Entertainment	PAL	English	-		
Classic Ranger Edition: Blue Ranger Adventure	12 May 2003	PG	Fox Kids Video; Buena Vista Home Entertainment	PAL	English	-		
The Best of Power Rangers: Ultimate Rangers	2 June 2003	PG	Fox Kids Video; Buena Vista Home Entertainment	PAL	English	-	Same as US DVD release.	

=== German DVD releases ===
DVD title	# of disc(s)	Year	# of episodes	DVD release
Mighty Morphin Power Rangers: Classixx: Season 1	6	1993-1994	60	25 May 2007
Mighty Morhin Power Rangers: Classixx: Season 2	6	1994-1995	52	28 September 2007
Mighty Morhin Power Rangers: Classixx: Season 3	6	1995-1996	33	28 January 2008
Mighty Morphin Power Rangers: The Complete Saga	19	1993-1996	145	26 March 2013

=== UK compilation DVD ===
DVD title	# of disc(s)	Year	# of episodes	DVD release	Notes
The Best of Power Rangers: The Ultimate Rangers	1	1994, 1998, 1999, 2000 & 2002	8	2 June 2003	Contains the same episodes as the US release.

=== France DVD releases ===
DVD title	# of disc(s)	Year	# of episodes	DVD release
Mighty Morphin Power Rangers: Volume 1: La Libération	1	1993-1996	5	2 January 2008
Mighty Morphin Power Rangers: Volume 2: Ceil de Lynx	1	1993-1996	5	2 January 2008
Mighty Morphin Power Rangers: Volume 3: Rocket Rangers	1	1993-1996	5	2 January 2008
Mighty Morphin Power Rangers: Volume 4: Le Ranger Vert	1	1993-1996	5	2 January 2008
Mighty Morphin Power Rangers: Volume 5: L'araignée	1	1993-1996	5	2 January 2008
Mighty Morphin Power Rangers: Volume 6: L'esprit D'équipe	1	1993-1996	5	2 January 2008
Mighty Morphin Power Rangers: Volume 7: Une Étoile Est Née	1	1993-1996	5	2 January 2008
Mighty Morphin Power Rangers: Volume 8: Le Régénérateur	1	1993-1996	5	2 January 2008
Mighty Morphin Power Rangers: Volume 9: La Fluer du Maul	1	1993-1996	5	2 January 2008
Mighty Morphin Power Rangers: Volume 10: Un Vieil Ami	1	1993-1996	5	2 January 2008
Mighty Morphin Power Rangers: Volume 11: Coup de Bec	1	1993-1996	5	2 January 2008
Mighty Morphin Power Rangers: Volume 12: Le Rhino Féroce	1	1993-1996	5	2 January 2008
Mighty Morphin Power Rangers: Volume 13: Mutinerie	1	1993-1996	5	2 January 2008
Mighty Morphin Power Rangers: Volume 14: Le Voleur de Pourvoir	1	1993-1996	5	2 January 2008
Mighty Morphin Power Rangers: Volume 15: La Belle et le Bête	1	1993-1996	5	2 January 2008
Mighty Morphin Power Rangers: Volume 16: Lumière Blanche	1	1993-1996	5	2 January 2008
Mighty Morphin Power Rangers: Volume 17: La Guerre des Ninjas	1	1993-1996	5	2 January 2008
Mighty Morphin Power Rangers: Volume 18: Zedd FM	1	1993-1996	5	2 January 2008
Mighty Morphin Power Rangers: Volume 19: La Chasse au Trésor	1	1993-1996	5	23 July 2012
Mighty Morphin Power Rangers: Volume 20: Le Visiteur	1	1993-1996	5	1 July 2012
Mighty Morphin Power Rangers: Volume 21: Le Mariage	1	1993-1996	5	1 July 2012
Mighty Morphin Power Rangers: Volume 22: Pauvre Billy	1	1993-1996	5	1 July 2012
Mighty Morphin Power Rangers: Volume 23: La Guerilla	1	1993-1996	5	1 July 2012
Mighty Morphin Power Rangers: Volume 24: Le Vol des Couleurs	1	1993-1996	5	1 July 2012
Mighty Morphin Power Rangers: Volume 25: Drôle de Match	1	1993-1996	5	1 July 2012
Mighty Morphin Power Rangers: Volume 26: La Potion D'amour	1	1993-1996	5	1 July 2012
Mighty Morphin Power Rangers: Volume 27: Suivez ce Taxi	1	1993-1996	5	1 July 2012
Mighty Morphin Power Rangers: Volume 28: Le Mangeur de Pierre	1	1993-1996	5	22 September 2008
Mighty Morphin Power Rangers: Volume 29: Le Cristal D'armaguedon	1	1993-1996	5	22 September 2008
Mighty Morphin Power Rangers: Volume 30: La Métamorphose de Bulk	1	1993-1996	5	22 September 2008
Mighty Morphin Power Rangers: Volume 31: Le Stratégie D'archeos	1	1993-1996	5	22 September 2008

== Region 4 (Australia) ==
=== DVD release ===
DVD title	# of disc(s)	Year	# of episodes	DVD release
Mighty Morphin Power Rangers: Complete First Season, Volume 1	5	1993-1994	30	2013
