= Zordon =

Fictional character in Power Rangers franchise

- Power Rangers character
- First appearance: "Day of the Dumpster" (Mighty Morphin Power Rangers)
- Portrayed by: David J. Fielding (Mighty Morphin Power Rangers); Nicholas Bell (1995 film); Russell Curry (Power Rangers Cosmic Fury); Bryan Cranston (2017 film)
- Voiced by: David J. Fielding; Robert L. Manahan; A.J. LoCascio (Rita's Rewind)

In-universe information
- Species: Eltarian
- Home: Eltar

Zordon is a fictional character from the Power Rangers franchise who serves as the Rangers' mentor. Zordon first appeared on the first season of Mighty Morphin Power Rangers and appeared in subsequent seasons until the conclusion of Power Rangers in Space, where he was the titular major supporting character of his saga.

== Character biography ==
Ten thousand years ago, Zordon clashes with his nemesis, Rita Repulsa, on Earth. During their final battle, Rita traps Zordon in a time warp while Zordon seals Rita and her minions away in a "Dumpster" on the Moon. After the battle ends, Zordon, with the aid of his robot assistant, Alpha 5, creates a Command Center in the California desert outside the town of Angel Grove. He then creates the Power Morphers, the Power Coins and the Dinozords. When Rita Repulsa is released from the Dumpster, Zordon recruits five teenagers from Angel Grove – Jason Lee Scott, Zack Taylor, Kimberly Hart, Trini Kwan, and Billy Cranston – to become the Power Rangers, giving them the Power Morphers, the Power Coins, and the Dinozords to battle Rita.

Zordon guides the Rangers over several years, creating the Zeo and Turbo powers to combat the threats of the Machine Empire and Divatox. Over time, Zordon upgrades the Command Center into the Power Chamber.

Zordon and Alpha leave Earth for Eltar, leaving the Turbo Rangers under the guidance of Dimitria and her assistant, Alpha 6, but return a short while later to attend the transfer of the Turbo powers to T.J., Cassie, Carlos and Ashley.

Months after his departure, Zordon is captured by Dark Specter, who slowly drains him of his powers, leaving the former Turbo Rangers to become the Space Rangers as they try to find and rescue him. Soon afterwards, Dark Specter launches his conquest of the universe and moves Zordon to the Dark Fortress, Astronema's base. After Dark Specter is killed by Darkonda who, in turn is also killed by the latter, Andros, the Red Space Ranger, travels to the Dark Fortress and finds Zordon. Zordon convinces Andros to shatter his energy tube, allowing his good energy to destroy the forces of evil. Zordon's death creates an energy wave that travels throughout the universe, turning Lord Zedd, Rita, and Divatox into humans, Astronema into her former self Karone, and the other villains into sand.

In the reunion movie Mighty Morphin Power Rangers: Once & Always, Billy Cranston attempts to resurrect Zordon by gathering the energy dispersed by the Z-Wave but accidentally revives the evil that had been expunged from Rita by the energy wave. This evil possesses Alpha 8 and becomes Robo-Rita, who terrorizes the world and plans to go back in time to kill all the Power Rangers before Zordon can recruit them, thus sealing her ultimate victory over Zordon. The Power Rangers manage to defeat her before she can initiate her plan.

In Power Rangers Cosmic Fury, Aiyon’s consciousness follows a dying Zayto into the Morphin Grid. He encounters a blue-eyed figure dressed in white who looks exactly like Zayto but does not recognize Aiyon. The apparition tells him Zayto is dead and that Aiyon’s friends need him. He returns Aiyon’s consciousness with parting words he said he used to say in such times, “May the power protect you.” Aiyon mentions this to Billy, who feels validated and confident that Zordon is still alive and could possibly be rescued.

== In other media ==
=== Mighty Morphin Power Rangers: The Movie ===
Zordon outside of his tube in Mighty Morphin Power Rangers: The Movie

In the 1995 film, Lord Zedd and Rita Repulsa free Ivan Ooze, who destroys the Command Center and Zordon's energy tube, leaving him on the verge of death. With Zordon dying, the Rangers travel to Phaedos in order to obtain the Great Power needed to revive him. After achieving their goal on Phaedos with the help of Dulcea, the Rangers return to Earth and defeat Ivan Ooze. Having succeeded, they return to the Command Center to find Zordon has died. The Rangers then use the Great Power to repair the Command Center and bring Zordon back to life.

=== Power Rangers (2017 film) ===
Bryan Cranston as Zordon in the 2017 film, Power Rangers.

Bryan Cranston portrays Zordon in the 2017 film, as a mixture of motion capture and CGI. Zordon is the former Red Ranger, who has become part of the Morphing Grid after his body was destroyed by a meteor he called down to destroy renegade Green Ranger Rita Repulsa, who had destroyed the rest of his team. Millennia later, after the new Ranger team is drawn together by the Power Coins to respond to the threat of the revived Rita, Jason overhears that Zordon, who has become desperate since the new Rangers fail to come together, intends to use the convergence of the Morphing Grid that will occur when the new Rangers connect to their powers for the first time to restore himself to a corporeal body to stop Rita. Jason then falsely accuses Zordon of using the team for his own agenda; however, when Billy Cranston is drowned by Rita after she forces him to reveal the location of the Zeo Crystal, the other four Rangers affirm their willingness to die for each other as Billy died for them, triggering the convergence Zordon anticipated, only for Zordon to sacrifice the chance to restore himself to bring Billy back to life, showing Zordon's faith in his successors. With Rita's defeat, Zordon congratulates the Rangers, assuring them that their names will be remembered with honor among the other great Rangers of history.

=== Boom! Studios Comics ===
The comic book series features Zordon in an alternate continuity starting in the original series shortly after Tommy joined the team. One early crisis sees the Rangers encounter an alternate reality where Tommy chose to remain evil even after Rita's spell was broken, adopting the alias "Lord Drakkon", which led to the destruction of the Command Centre in that world. When the two worlds initially make contact, Zordon spoke with his counterpart, affirming that he has faith that his version of Tommy will not follow Drakkon's example.

Later storylines reveal that Zordon formed a team of Rangers in 1969 prior to the modern team, to stop Psycho Green when he arrived on Earth's moon, this team consisting of five different adults from all over the world. While these Rangers managed to stop Psycho Green, they failed to work as a proper team due to their differing views, which resulted in three of them dying before Psycho Green was defeated. In the present day, Grace Sterling- the Red Ranger of this team- has formed the organisation Prometheus, working to protect Earth through advanced science based on what she witnessed in her time as a Ranger, and has a tense relationship with Zordon, as they both seek to protect Earth but Grace feels that Zordon should do more for the world while Zordon is bound by certain rules preventing him from taking a more active involvement in Earth's affairs.

When Lord Drakkon comes to attack Earth, Zordon appeals to the Morphing Masters- manifestations of the Morphing Grid itself- for help stopping Drakkon when his actions lead to Tommy being killed and cause reality to split into multiple timelines as Drakkon tries to harness the power of the Morphing Grid for himself. The Masters dismiss Zordon's concern about Drakkon, and declare that attempting to contact them like this has cost him the chance to join them after Zordon's own death. Ultimately Drakkon's attack allows him to restructure reality to a timeline that fits Drakkon's goal, but through a temporal paradox Tommy is able to restore himself to existence and rally his team to rebuild reality.

Once reality has been restored, Zordon is disturbed when Billy is revealed to have been working with Prometheus, finding a way to recharge the Green Power Coin using Chaos energy. As a result, Kimberly's ex-boyfriend Matt is chosen as a Prometheus-sponsored Green Ranger shortly before Earth is attacked by the forces of Eltar, Zordon's home planet. Zartus, the leader of this assault, was once a friend of Zordon, but Zartus has become convinced that any world that does not measure up to his standards must be destroyed, prompting Zordon to declare his allegiance to Earth over Eltar and help the Rangers oppose his former friend. The Command Centre is nearly destroyed in the subsequent conflict, but Billy reveals that he has created a system that transferred Zordon from his time warp into a new containment suit that allows Zordon to move and fight alongside the Rangers. During the campaign, Zordon learns that Lord Zedd was once his friend Zophram, the Supreme Guardian of Eltar, who was disfigured into his current state after he tried to steal the Zeo Crystal, who blames Zordon for what happened to him. Ultimately Zordon and Zedd join forces to stop Zartus, and Zedd returns his old friend to the Rangers, but makes it clear that he will not abandon his campaign against Earth. The Rangers are ultimately able to retrieve a new Command Centre from another world and restore Zordon to the warp after Billy's containment suit proves to be too dangerous to use long-term.
