= Bulk and Skull =

Fictional characters in the Power Rangers franchise

- Power Rangers character
- Skull (left) and Bulk (right)
- First appearance: "Day of the Dumpster" (Mighty Morphin Power Rangers)
- Portrayed by: Paul Schrier (Bulk [Teen and Adult]); Jason Narvy (Skull [Teen and Adult]); Cody Slaton (Bulk [Young]); Ross J. Samya (Skull [Young]); Bob F. Valva (Bulk in the first TV Pilot)

In-universe information
- Home: Earth

Farkas "Bulk" Bulkmeier and Eugene "Skull" Skullovitch are fictional characters in the Power Rangers universe. They appeared as permanent characters from Mighty Morphin Power Rangers until Power Rangers in Space. Bulk was a recurring character in Power Rangers Lost Galaxy, along with Power Rangers Samurai and Power Rangers Super Samurai, but the duo never returned together as permanent characters. Bulk and Skull are portrayed by Paul Schrier and Jason Narvy respectively.

== Character overview ==
Bulk was the dominant member of the duo. His appearance resembled a heavyset teenage punk. Skull was lean and wore more formal attire. Skull often emulated Bulk's behavior or agreed with his statements.

The duo provided slapstick comic relief to the franchise. The duo came with their own theme; a musical combo of Skull's whiny laugh and Bulk's "fat guy tuba". Their actions were punctuated by cartoon sound effects.

== Appearances ==
=== Mighty Morphin Power Rangers pilots ===
In the pilot for the TV show, a gang of punk bullies included an unnamed character played by Paul Schrier. The leader of the gang, Bulk, was a stereotypical bully. He hits on Kimberly but she rejects his advances. This leads to the entire gang engaging in line dancing at a bowling alley with the five Rangers-to-be. Each one is disposed of by a typical gang manner, such as a generic "Punk #5" played by Paul Schrier sliding into the bowling pins when kicked in the back by Jason. Another gang member is unwittingly hit by Billy. Jason Narvy is not present in the pilot. Schrier got the role, according to him, by turning up ten minutes earlier than the other auditioning actors, so the director standing in for "Punk #5" at the audition got him to do it.

In a second pilot, shown at Power Morphicon 2007, Schrier was playing a named character (Bulk) and was now the leader of the gang, which included Jason Narvy as Skull. Narvy had originally auditioned for Billy and was called back to audition for Skull, as, according to Narvy, the actor who played "Punk #1" in the pilot was thought to look too intimidating to play a comedic character. He turned up to his audition intending to be obnoxious, as he was tired of the industry at the time, which helped get the role; Narvy and Schrier quickly bonded during rehearsals.

This version of Bulk was defeated in a similar slapstick style to the show - he's eventually tied up by a skipping rope - but is more menacing than he'd be in the series, physically intimidating Kimberly (who sounds worried about angering him), using some of the lines from "Punk #1", and throwing aside both the female punk & Skull when they get in his way. The debut of the pilot's Bulk and Skull would end up as the ending scene in the episode "Big Sisters".

=== Mighty Morphin Power Rangers ===
Bulk and Skull started out as bullies at Angel Grove High School, usually targeting the Power Rangers in the 'B plots' of the episode. They were regulars at Angel Grove's Youth Center. Their actions were motivated by greed and ego in the first season. Wacky schemes abound (such as creating an obviously-fake kung fu style called "Cockroach Kung Fu" to attempting to catch fish or claiming reward money for themselves and dressing up like superheroes calling themselves Bulkster and Super Skull) always ends in failure and/or being humiliated. Often, the duo got themselves mixed up with some of the villains' schemes. They are also frequently put in detention by Angel Grove High's somewhat-antagonistic but well meaning principal, Mr. Caplan.

In early episodes, as with the second pilot, Bulk and Skull had accomplices: a female punk is with them in "Teamwork" and "Food Fight", and a black male punk in "Food Fight". Early scripts for Season 1 show the female punk was meant to be a recurring character named Sharkie. She was written into scripts up into "The Trouble With Shellshock" (The name, was differently spelled, and was already in use on Fox Kids).

Bulk is seen as the de facto leader of the duo, and drums up the schemes which turns to failure. Skull is shown to be more sensitive and had a crush on Kimberly, while Bulk appeared to want to win Trini's heart, as well, in a few episodes. Whenever the girls were alone, they tried their best to win them over, although it resulted in Bulk and Skull's humiliation. When Kimberly and Trini are with the four male Rangers, they are called six "nerds" and "geeks", and occasionally "dorks" and "losers", as well, among other insults. This group of demeaning insults and name-calling would eventually turn against them by the time of the episode "A Friend in Need", when two teenage girls call them as such throughout the episode.

During the early part of the first season, Bulk and Skull would occasionally be presented as threats, physically intimidating or attempting to assault the Rangers or others; Bulk even had a bench press record in "A Pressing Engagement". Over time, while still being antagonistic, their more aggressive nature was toned down and they would get some more sympathetic portrayals. In the first-season episode "Foul Play in the Sky", which had footage shot later in production and then edited in later, Bulk and Skull were even shown with a normal hobby, plane-spotting and politely ask to join Kimberly and her Uncle on a flight; "A Pig Surprise" would have them happily looking after a pig; and in the three-part "The Ninja Encounter" in season two, when Bulk spotted a runaway baby stroller, he and Skull immediately sprang into action to help out, and the duo would spend the rest of the episode looking after the baby boy until his father escaped Goldar's clutches. This was also the first time the duo were seen on skateboards which, despite their generally unathletic nature, they appeared moderately skilled at.

During the second season, they attempted to discover the secret identities of the Power Rangers and repeatedly failed either due to their bumbling nature, or the Rangers' interference. The duo eventually give up by the time of the episode "A Friend in Need: Part III". During this time, Bulk and Skull started showing greater intelligence and initiative than before, coming up with complicated plans and utilizing bizarre gadgets. While a majority of their plans were harebrained, a few of them were actually clever, like making a cement cast of the Power Rangers' footprints so they can see if any civilians' feet match. They discovered the Rangers' identities twice. At one time, they saved the Rangers when the Ranger team lost their memories and de-morphed in front of them - Bulk and Skull tricked the Scatterbrain monster to fire his amnesia beam through two prisms, distorting the beam and restoring the Rangers' memories. Unfortunately, Bulk and Skull lost their short-term memories in the process due to being flung back by the amnesia beam and landing on their heads. The second time, a psychic pointed the Ranger teens out to Bulk, but he did not believe her as they were holding a picture of the morphed Ranger team at the time when it was just given to them by Ernie.

A change of direction for the duo occurred in the third season of Mighty Morphin Power Rangers, when they joined the Angel Grove Junior Police Patrol (having heard girls like men in uniform) and first met Lieutenant Jerome Stone, explicitly changing from bumbling bullies into good-natured knuckleheads, the duo gradually becoming friends with the ranger teens themselves; Ernie and the Rangers expressed pride at the duo for graduating police training. Lt. Stone became a permanent character himself, frequently giving Bulk and Skull orders that they usually failed to perform, leading eventually to his anger (rather than just their humiliation). Despite this, Bulk and Skull were close to Lt. Stone and took their new job seriously as they would be shown trying to perform police duties (albeit incompetently) and occasionally try to help people in trouble: in "The Changing of the Zords: Part I" they rushed to save children from drowning (who were not), in "Follow That Cab" they tried to stop a thief who'd stolen Kimberly's car and managed to apprehend him, ironically after they inadvertently helped him, and in "Rita's Pita" they used their own money as donations to an elderly home to cover for their mistake, and they assisted in a housing project in "Another Brick in the Wall".

A number of season three jokes would also be based around Bulk and Skull constantly running into monsters and being comically terrified; in "The Changing of the Zords: Part II", Lt. Stone finally questioned why they always seem to run into monsters. The best way to describe them is "monster magnets".

=== Mighty Morphin Alien Rangers ===
Bulk and Skull are regressed to children due to Master Vile's Orb of Doom. They would act like the bullies they were in the first season. Bulk is briefly turned into the "Brat Boy" monster by Rita and Zedd during the course of the mini-series and battles the Aquitian Rangers, but soon rebels against his masters as his human self surfaces from within, prompting Rita and Zedd to return him to normal in retaliation. When the Zeo Crystal was reformed and undid the time Reversal, Bulk and Skull, who were on playground swings and trying to see who could go the highest, where the first to return to their normal ages. When the swings break and they land next to each other, the two are puzzled as to why they are there and agree not to tell anyone.

Paul Schrier directed a few "Mighty Morphin Alien Rangers" episodes, including "Attack of the 60' Bulk", which he also appeared in briefly, despite his character at the time being reduced to the age of a child. Schrier (under the name of Paul Schrier II) had also directed a few episodes of Power Rangers: Turbo during the first half of the season (while his character of Bulk was a chimp).

=== Power Rangers Zeo ===
During Power Rangers Zeo, Bulk and Skull remained members of the Junior Police Force (even getting a new motorcycle with a sidecar). They remained members until Bulk's attempts to woo the police chief's daughter accidentally caused Lt. Stone to be fired. They quit the force out of loyalty to Stone and joined him when he opened his own detective agency. While they initially continued to be scared of monsters, their sub-plots would shift towards their detective work after they switched jobs. In "The Joke's On Blue", they also had to clash with a rival gang of detectives, Humphrey and Bogart, who were trying to frame a new student named Robert for a series of practical jokes all over town, until Kat and Tanya helped expose the rival detectives as the practical jokers with the help of the owner of the novelty shop in identifying both Humphrey and Bogart as his best customers.

Also, during this time, Bulk and Skull secretly hosted Rito and Goldar, who lost their memories after setting up the bomb that destroyed the Command Center at the end of Mighty Morphin' Power Rangers, adopting them as their "pets" (though the two monsters really were more like Bulk and Skull's servants). However, when Rito and Goldar regained their memories, they turned on their masters and went back to Lord Zedd and Rita.

In the episode "Instrument of Destruction", Skull shows he is an adept classical pianist by playing Chopin's Revolutionary Etude. While Skull enjoyed classical music, it was something of a hidden shame behind his tough guy image. Fearing mockery, he kept his talent hidden even from Bulk. This moment shows that the Rangers thought of Bulk and Skull as their friends and vice versa, when Skull confides in Adam about his talents and he offers him his support, saying Bulk would do the same if he were truly his friend. After seeing Skull perform at a recital, Bulk was honestly moved and praised his friend, apologizing for making him feel insecure about his talent and joining him on stage to applaud him.

Perhaps Bulk and Skull's greatest achievement during their time in the series occurred during this season. In the "King for a Day" two-parter, they're accidentally trapped in Prince Gasket's prison while looking for a lost Tommy. They encountered another prisoner, a reptilian alien named Tritor, who believed them to be great heroic warriors that Gasket had abducted. The duo play up this façade and end up being part of Tritor's plan to free the other prisoners. They get to defeat a squad of Cogs, while Tritor manages to destroy both the brain drain machine that had been used on Tommy and the other prisoners, and the generator to the forcefield that trapped Gasket's hostages in the Machine Arena and prevented the Rangers from morphing. Before dropping them back on Earth, Tritor says that they will be legends and honored on his homeworld of Horath which they have just helped save. Nobody believes their later tale, except for Tommy, Katherine and Jason who overhear them boasting about it. However, thinking they are just being further mocked, the duo storm off.

Near the end of Zeo, Bulk and Skull take a test for their detectives licenses. A monster attack occurs during the test, but the duo believe it to be part of the exam to see if they can "concentrate under fire". They manage to take the test during the entire attack, even as the office falls apart around them. When Detective Stone presents them with their results, they are initially pleased that they passed. Detective Stone then reveals that normally they would have failed, but the examiners gave them extra points for completing the test during the monster attack. This ends up shocking the two as they realize the attack was real and they could have died.

Zeo concluded with Bulk and Skull accepting an offer to work for an agency in France on a top secret mission, They departed much to the dismay and frustration of Stone. This major plot point was dropped without explanation in between Zeo and filming of Turbo: A Power Rangers Movie.

=== Turbo: A Power Rangers Movie ===
At the beginning of the movie, Bulk, Skull, and Lieutenant Stone are again seen working as police officers (the reason for this remains unexplained until the first episode of Power Rangers Turbo). Later, while on a secluded road, they are abducted by Elgar to be used as sacrifices for Maligore, scrambling their brains in the process to make them easier to deal with. When Divatox deems the pair inadequate as sacrifices, they are thrown below deck on the Subcraft. Due to the brain scramble, they come to be under the impression that they are Antonio Bandaras (Skull) and an unnamed German (Bulk), much to the annoyance of their inmates, Jason and Kimberly. In spite of their disoriented state of mind, they are able to successfully escape the Subcraft with Jason and Kimberly and are later rescued by the Power Rangers, who presumably help them restore their minds back to the way they were.

=== Power Rangers Turbo ===
At the start of Power Rangers Turbo, Bulk and Skull are given one last chance to rejoin the Police Force with Lt. Stone. Unfortunately, their assignment inadvertently brings them into contact with Elgar, who turns them into chimpanzees. This marked a permanent end to Bulk and Skull's time with the police.

Bulk and Skull would remain chimpanzees until "Honey, I Shrunk the Rangers: Part II". They are voiced by their respective actors, however only the audience can understand them. Lt. Stone takes the chimpanzees into his care (claiming that they seem 'familiar'). They make several attempts to inform him and others of their true identities, but are unsuccessful. They were transformed into Chimps so Narvy and Schrier would have time to work on a proposed spin-off series for the characters which would have seen them operate a hotel, featuring El Vez, the "Mexican Elvis" (a local personality in Southern California). The attempts never made it to a final production, and the actors returned full-time to the series.

Later, four of the Rangers are shrunk by one of Divatox's monsters. They use two of her submarine's torpedoes (her way of making monsters grow) to return to normal. Bulk and Skull happened to be near the impact site and are returned to normal as a result, though they are also temporarily made invisible. This state only lasts until "Stitch Witchery", until they become visible again. When they return, Stone asks where they've been, to which they reply, "Just monkeying around."

Out of high school and no longer police officers, Bulk and Skull needed something to do. Stone arranged for them to get jobs – ranging from pizza delivery to construction. They were always fired from them, so they usually had new jobs in every episode they appeared in. Also during this time, they got to know the second generation of Turbo Rangers. During most of the season, the Rangers were used to their wacky antics and tolerated them, but they seemed to like the two, with T.J. specifically treating them as his friends. Notably, in "Parts and Parcel", Bulk and Skull are suspected of stealing from their current job and T.J. outright states to the Rangers that he knows they would not do that, and as the Red Ranger, he goes on to prove them innocent.

=== Power Rangers in Space ===
In "Save Our Ship", Bulk and Skull spot a UFO approaching Earth. They end up going to work for Professor Phenomenus, who is constantly on the search for aliens on Earth. The Professor immediately proved to be very odd, but also quite brilliant. The trio's antics frequently saw them crossing paths with the Space Rangers (whenever they were on Earth, of course). Due to the majority of the Rangers' adventures often taking them off Earth, and because of the season's more serious nature, Bulk and Skull appeared in only thirteen of its forty-three episodes, making it the season in which they had the fewest appearances as part of the main cast.

In "Countdown to Destruction: Part 2", Bulk and Skull undergo their most noteworthy change. The Space Rangers had battled the invading forces of Astronema, but were overwhelmed and forced to retreat. Astronema demanded that the Rangers be turned over to her or else Earth would be destroyed. Everyone in Angel Grove had lost hope, but Bulk and Skull still had faith that the Power Rangers would save them. The next morning, the Rangers (sans Andros, who left to board the Dark Fortress) intend to turn themselves in to save Earth. However, Bulk suddenly announces he is a Ranger, prompting Skull, Professor Phenomenus and every other present civilian to do the same. A frustrated Astronema orders their destruction, but then the real Space Rangers reveal themselves (Bulk is stunned to learn the Rangers were "them"). As the Rangers battle Elgar, the Quantrons and the Piranhatrons, Bulk, inspired by the Rangers, rallies the civilians together to "get in there" and he and Skull lead the charge to help the Rangers in battle. After Zordon's energy wave destroys the invading forces, Bulk, Skull and Professor Phenomenous are among those celebrating.

In the initial plans for in Space, Bulk and Skull were going to form a volunteer Citizen Force Group to protect Angel Grove while the Power Rangers were away.

=== Power Rangers Lost Galaxy ===
Bulk and Professor Phenomenus board the space station Terra Venture for its interstellar journey. Certain that they were forgetting something, Bulk and the Professor realized too late that Skull was not with them. Skull had overslept and did not wake up in time to join them.

Sometime into Terra Venture's journey, the two were working at the station's restaurant, the Comet Cafe. Mike Corbett thought they were supposed to be working in the science division. Despite Professor Phenomenus' attempted spin, Bulk clarified that they had been fired. At the end of the series, Bulk and Phenomenus survived Terra Venture's crash and evacuation to Mirinoi. After the Galaxy Rangers saved the people from Trakeena's last attack, Bulk and the Professor were among those cheering them.

=== Power Rangers Wild Force ===
During the Power Rangers Wild Force episode "Forever Red", Bulk and Skull made a special cameo appearance, though how Bulk returned from Mirinoi is never explained.

Bulk and Skull were shown as servers and managers of a tropical-themed bar called "Bulkmeier's". Tommy Oliver, the veteran Power Ranger, is also present. In this episode, Bulk and Skull were shown having a conversation about the early days of Power Rangers - in particular, Bulk is bragging to Skull about how he once met Lord Zedd and Rita Repulsa. Skull feigns interest before pointedly reminding him that he did, too. Bulk takes a call from Andros that was meant for Tommy, and the two seemed somewhat intimidated by the idea of talking to Tommy despite having known him for years; this hint that they may be aware that he's a Ranger.

In the original cut of "Forever Red", their scene went on longer. The two would try to refer to more foot soldiers to one-up each other (including later monsters they had not seen on screen); Skull stated he was avoiding Phenomenous; and the characters are wary of Tommy because he's their boss and the real owner of Bulkmeier's. (As this was never aired, it is not taken as canon and was contradicted by the later Power Rangers Dino Thunder.) In an earlier outline of Forever Red, Bulk & Skull were not going to be present but Tommy would pass up a T-shirt of "the famous two-man rock band Bulk & Skull".

Between Lost Galaxy and Wild Force, Schrier was still involved with the PR Crew, voicing Infinitor in Power Rangers Lightspeed Rescue and Severax in Power Rangers Time Force.

=== Power Rangers Samurai and Power Rangers Super Samurai ===
Power Rangers Samurai follows Bulk trying to train Skull's son Spike in the ways of the Samurai, but failing each time. The two of them operated out of a converted garage. Due to Bulk's sister's marriage with Skull, Spike addresses him as "Uncle Bulk" - he had to be reminded to call him "Sensei" during training. Much like his father, Spike has a big crush on the Pink Ranger.

Skull made a brief appearance in the Power Rangers Super Samurai finale, "Samurai Forever", where Skull picks up his son; he arrives in a limo with a suit. Bulk and Skull size each other up and Bulk remarks he's changed, but after a brief tease of conflict they're shown to still be friends. Skull remains accident-prone as he and Spike hit their heads on a sign when waving good-bye to Bulk.

In the original casting sides, Bulk and Spike were not present and the comic relief were two singing roadsweepers "Big Mack" and "Skinny Jack".

=== Mighty Morphin Power Rangers: Once & Always ===
In Mighty Morphin Power Rangers: Once & Always, though the two do not appear in person, they are briefly shown on a billboard where they apparently own a food company.

=== Mighty Morphin Power Rangers: The Movie ===
In Mighty Morphin Power Rangers: The Movie, Bulk and Skull participated in the charity skydive with the Ranger teens, but landed in a construction site where Ivan Ooze's prison egg would be unearthed. They are later seen during a party at Ernie's and assist the Rangers' young friend Fred Kelman and the other Kids in stopping the brainwashed parents of Angel Grove from leaping to their deaths. When the movie ends with a celebration at Angel Grove Harbor, and a sign thanking the Power Rangers for saving the world is lit up, Bulk and Skull are offended, even though they had just played a major part in saving people's lives.

== Canceled spinoff ==
Around the time of Zeo, Saban planned to make a Bulk and Skull comedy spinoff show, where they would run a hotel (Jason Narvy has said that he thinks it was "their grandmothers' hotel"). A Mexican Elvis impersonator was going to be a supporting character. Narvy claims that the video release The Good, The Bad, and the Stupid was put out as a "test market" and when "no one out there bought it", Saban cancelled the plans. This is also the reason why the characters were turned into chimpanzees in Turbo as the actors who played them were busy shooting the pilot for their spin-off.

=== Power/Rangers (2015 short film) ===
In Power/Rangers Bulk and Skull (played by Tony Gomez and Matt D'Elia), in this much darker reimagining, in this timeline the Machine Empire defeats the Power Rangers and destroys the Megazord in battle, Earth's governments negotiate a truce with the Machine Empire and the Power Rangers are disbanded. Bulk and Skull are Meth addicts and betray Kimberly Hart and Jason Lee Scott to the Machines for more Meth. Tommy Oliver goes to their trailer only to find they have both died of overdoses. It is later revealed that they were murdered by Rita Repulsa.

== See also ==
- Laurel and Hardy
