= Day of the Dumpster =

- Mighty Morphin Power Rangers episode
- Two astronauts who are on the Moon investigating a mysterious dumpster
- Episode no.: Season 1 Episode 1
- Directed by: Adrian Carr
- Written by: Tony Oliver; Shuki Levy
- Production code: 101
- Original air date: August 28, 1993

Episode chronology
← Previous —	Next → "High Five"

"Day of the Dumpster" is the first episode of both the American television series Mighty Morphin Power Rangers and the entire Power Rangers franchise. It premiered on the Fox network on August 28, 1993, as part of its Fox Kids programming block, and was later released on VHS and DVD. A new re-version of the episode later aired on ABC on January 2, 2010, as part of ABC Kids. As with the first season's episodes, most of the scenes featuring the Rangers in morphed form, the Zords and the villains are taken from the Japanese tokusatsu series, Kyōryū Sentai Zyuranger, the 16th entry of the Power Rangers franchise's Japanese counterpart of origin, Super Sentai.

The VHS of this episode ranked #35 in a list of top video sales, and #11 in a list of top kids' video sales, for the year of 1994 as compiled by Billboard. The tie-in 3D read-along audio cassette of "Day of the Dumpster" became the number one seller at Walden Kids, displacing The Lion King.

== Plot summary ==
Two astronauts explore the Moon and come across a space dumpster – when they open it, the evil sorceress Rita Repulsa and her minions Goldar, Squatt, Baboo, and Finster are set free from a 10,000-year captivity. Rita decides to conquer the nearest planet: Earth, and rebuilds her palace on the Moon.

In the city of Angel Grove, California, five teenagers – Jason Lee Scott, Zack Taylor, Kimberly Hart, Billy Cranston, and Trini Kwan – are hanging out at the local youth center. The guys are working on karate, while the girls are practicing gymnastics. Farkas "Bulk" Bulkmeier and Eugene "Skull" Skullovitch come to harass them, but end up making fools of themselves.

The teens are later sitting down to some fruit shakes from Ernie's Juice Bar when Rita causes an earthquake. In the Command Center, which is located in a desert area, Zordon, the wise wizard who once battled Rita many years ago, tells his robotic assistant, Alpha 5, to find and teleport to him five teenagers to safeguard Earth from Rita's schemes.

Jason, Zack, Kimberly, Billy, and Trini are then teleported to the Command Center. Zordon explains the situation and declares them the Power Rangers, a team of warriors sworn to defend life; he gives them belt-stored Power Morphers that serve as the key to accessing their power. They refuse to believe or trust him, until Rita sends a team of her Putty Patrollers to attack them outside. The teens are soon overpowered by the Putties' numbers, but Jason suggests using their Power Morphers. They then instantly morph into the Power Rangers for the first time.

After Alpha informs Zordon that the teens have morphed, Zordon has him teleport the Rangers back to Angel Grove where Rita has sent Goldar. There, the Rangers clash with another team of Putty Patrollers on the city rooftops. Soon after, Rita uses her magic staff to enlarge Goldar for a giant-sized attack on the city. In response to this, the Rangers summon the Dinozords and then form the Megazord. Following an intense battle between Goldar and the Megazord, Jason summons the Megazord's Power Sword but Goldar retreats before they can finish him off.

Back at the Command Center, the teens are finally convinced that they can save the world from Rita's evil and so decide to accept their new responsibilities as Power Rangers under three conditions:

- They must not use their power for personal (nor for political) gain.
- They must not escalate a battle unless forced to do so.
- And they must keep their identities a secret from the public.

Zordon promises that he will be there to advise them whenever they need his wisdom and guidance.

== Cast ==
=== Primary cast ===
- Austin St. John as Jason Lee Scott, Red Ranger
- Walter Emanuel Jones as Zack Taylor, Black Ranger
- Amy Jo Johnson as Kimberly Hart, Pink Ranger
- David Yost as Billy Cranston, Blue Ranger
- Thuy Trang as Trini Kwan, Yellow Ranger
- Paul Schrier as Farkas "Bulk" Bulkmeier
- Jason Narvy as Eugene "Skull" Skullovitch
- David Fielding as Zordon

=== Secondary cast ===
- Machiko Soga as the footage portrayal of Rita Repulsa
  - Barbara Goodson as the voice portrayal of Rita Repulsa
- Richard Genelle as Ernie
- Takashi Sakamoto and Kazutoshi Yokoyama as the footage portrayal of Goldar
  - Kerrigan Mahan as the voice portrayal of Goldar
- Minoru Watanabe as the footage portrayal Squatt
  - Michael Sorich as the voice portrayal of Squatt
- Hideaki Kusaka as the footage portrayal of Baboo
  - Dave Mallow as the voice portrayal of Baboo
- Takako Iiboshi as the footage portrayal of Finster
  - Robert Axelrod as the voice portrayal of Finster
- Romy J. Sharf as the footage portrayal of Alpha 5
  - Richard Steven Horvitz as the voice portrayal of Alpha 5

== Unaired pilots ==
The original pilot episode, in an edited form, was shown in a 1999 special titled "The Lost Episode", which was hosted by Austin St. John and Walter Jones. It contained the same basic story as the released "Day of the Dumpster", but with several differences. This included actress Audri DuBois in the role of Trini and Bobby Val as Skull, different voice actors for the villains, the local hangout being a bowling alley instead of Ernie's Juice Bar, and Alpha having a different body shape. In its original unaired, unedited form the archetypal Zords are referred to as "Droids", the Power Morphers referred to as "Transmorphers" and Zordon was referred to as "Zoltar". The morphing and teleportation sequences were also different.

A second pilot episode was presented in 2007 at the inaugural Power Morphicon convention by Tony Oliver. This featured Thuy Trang as Trini, Jason Narvy as Skull, and Richard Genelle as Ernie, as well as other aspects that made it to the aired series premiere. Scenes from the second pilot would later be used for the episode "Big Sisters".

== Re-versioning ==
As part of the 2010 re-versioned broadcast of the series, several visual effects were added to the scenes to produce the effect of new footage being broadcast in addition to some scenes removed. This includes cutting in comic book-referenced graphics similar to the movie Creepshow and adding onomatopoeia words on screen, akin to the 1960s Batman series, or possibly even referencing 1994's Super Sentai incarnation, Ninja Sentai Kakuranger, which was the source material for Season 3 and the special spin-off continuation of the third season, Mighty Morphin Alien Rangers.

== Re-ignition ==
As part of a 2025 re-broadcast of the series on YouTube and Netflix, the footage from the original 1993 episode was digitally cleaned and up-scaled using AI technology and given a new show logo. Now titled Mighty Morphin Power Rangers Re-Ignition, the re-release of the series in this AI enhanced format coincided with a new toy line of the same title by Playmates Toys.
