= Alpha 5 (Power Rangers) =

Fictional character

- Power Rangers character
- First appearance: "Day of the Dumpster" (Mighty Morphin Power Rangers)
- Portrayed by: Romy J. Sharf (1993–1994); Sandi Sellner (1994–1995); Peta-Maree Rixon (Mighty Morphin Power Rangers: The Movie); Donene Kistler (1995–1997)
- Voiced by: Richard Steven Horvitz; Bill Hader (Power Rangers); A.J. LoCascio (Rita's Rewind)

In-universe information
- Species: A.I
- Affiliation: Power Rangers
- Home: Edenoi

Alpha 5 is a fictional character from the television series Mighty Morphin Power Rangers. A fully self-aware artificial intelligence, he (Note: As primary and secondary sources cited in this article have referred to Alpha 5 by the masculine pronoun, the character appears to possess masculine programming.) is the robotic assistant of the Power Rangers, and resides in their base of operations, the Command Center along their mentor Zordon. The character is known for his "Aye-yi-yi-yi-yi!" catchphrase.

Alpha 5 has been physically portrayed by multiple actors: Romy J. Sharf, Sandi Sellner and Donene Kistler in the television series, and Peta-Maree Rixon in Mighty Morphin Power Rangers: The Movie. Richard Steven Horvitz voiced Alpha 5 for the character's appearances in most Power Rangers franchise media, starting from Mighty Morphin Power Rangers television series until Power Rangers Turbo, which marked the character's final appearance in the Power Rangers television series. In the 2017 reboot film, Alpha 5 is a CGI character voiced by Bill Hader. Various merchandise for the character, as with other of the series' characters, has been released since the inception of the Power Rangers franchise.

== Character overview ==
Alpha 5 appears as a recurring supporting character for the Power Rangers in the series. His role is to provide communications support for the Rangers on their missions and is responsible for maintenance of the Command Center. He also serves as the Rangers' technician, constructing weapons for them to use against their opponents. He is best known for his signature catchphrase, "Aye-yi-yi-yi-yi!", usually uttered by the character when he is distressed or excited. Alpha 5's original iteration is described by Nicholas Mojica of International Business Times as a "vintage robot look"; his head is shaped like a golden flying saucer, adorned with a visor that flashes when he is speaking. Another one of the character's visual cues is an inverted yellow stylized lightning bolt similar to the Power Rangers' lightning bolt symbol on his chest.

The character is depicted as naive and childlike in temperament, and often behaves like a surrogate younger sibling to the Power Rangers wanting to spend time with them.

== Creation and development ==
Richard Horvitz, credited as "Richard Wood" for the Power Rangers series, developed Alpha's catchphrase when the series was in development. Horvitz also voiced Alpha 5's future successor, Alpha 7, in the Power Rangers Wild Force episode Forever Red.

Romy J. Sharf physically portrayed Alpha 5 for 89 episodes of the Mighty Morphin Power Rangers series as well as the Alpha’s Magical Christmas holiday special. Sandi Sellner took over the role for 45 episodes in seasons 2 and 3. Donene Kistler, who also worked as a production assistant on the series, assumed the role for the remainder of Alpha 5's appearances in the series. Kistler would go on to portray Alpha 5's successor, Alpha 6, for Power Rangers Turbo and Power Rangers In Space.

== Appearances ==
=== Mighty Morphin Power Rangers ===
Alpha 5 debuted in the first episode of Mighty Morphin Power Rangers and provides a support role for the titular protagonists. Though he is a non-combatant, Alpha 5 has occasionally been involved in direct engagements with enemy forces. In "Green with Evil: Part 1", Rita sent the brainwashed Green Ranger to sabotage the Command Center; he slipped a virus-infected CD-ROM into Alpha's inner workings, which causes him to convulse violently. After Billy repaired his circuitry and removed the virus, Alpha later captured the Green Ranger in a force field, but Rita rescued him before Alpha could reveal his identity. In one episode, Alpha 5 left the Command Center on Zordon's instructions to retrieve a magical item known as the "Singing Squash" to undo a spell placed on Kimberly and Billy. he encountered Rita's Putty Patrol, but manages to disabled his attackers with his internal defense and the magical squash.

In the second season of Mighty Morphin Power Rangers, Alpha had three encounters with Lord Zedd's forces. In The Wannabe Ranger, he attempted to assist a little boy lost in Angel Grove Park, but was attacked by the Primator, a shapeshifting gorilla monster who disguised himself as Billy and tried to trick Alpha into taking him to the Command Center. Alpha activated his self-destruct sequence to protect the Command Center, but seemed unable to deactivate it once the Primator left, and it was necessary for the Rangers to do so. Later in the season, he would leave the Command Center to rescue the now-regressed Rangers, who had been trapped within a photograph by the Photomare monster after being regressed into children. In his attempt to capture the photo, Alpha was confronted by both Photomare and Goldar, but he was able to freeze both villains with a device of his and escape. Near the end of the season, in The Wedding, he was ambushed by Finster and the Putties as he took a hike outside the Command Center. Just as the Green Ranger had, Finster inserted a disc into Alpha's circuits, but instead of delivering a virus, this CD warped Alpha's personality into an evil, obnoxious brat, who assisted Zedd and Rita by tricking the Rangers into an abandoned theater (which Finster proceeded to fill with monsters). Alpha also cut the Rangers off from Zordon and the Thunderzords. When Zordon's pleas for him to stop annoyed him, Alpha comically altered Zordon's image before shutting him off completely. Billy eventually removed the disc from Alpha, instantly returning him to normal.

In the third season, it was revealed that Alpha was constructed on the planet Edenoi, located in the Andromeda constellation by King Lexian, the grandfather of the Masked Rider. The Power Rangers, minus a sick Kimberly, later team up with the Masked Rider against Count Dregon and his forces in a crossover episode.

=== Mighty Morphin Alien Rangers ===
Alpha initially saved the Command Center from destruction by defusing an implosion generator planted there by Rito and Goldar, though the duo's second attempt was successful as they managed to infiltrate the Command Center's basement to place Lord Zedd's detonation device. They discovered the deactivated remains of Alpha 4, Alpha 5's obsolete predecessor. Subsequently, they placed one of the detonators on Alpha 4's body, and the center was later destroyed in the explosion.

=== Power Rangers Zeo ===
Alpha 5 was later shown to have survived the events of Mighty Morphin Alien Rangers, as he is discovered to be safe within the secondary base, the Power Chamber. Now assisted by Billy, Alpha 5 continued to serve the Rangers (now the Power Rangers Zeo) as they battled the Machine Empire. A brief encounter with the Cogs resulted badly for Alpha, being short-circuited by an electric shock from one of their spears.

=== Power Rangers Turbo ===
When Zordon left for his home planet of Eltar (in Shift Into Turbo), Alpha 5 went with him, saddened that he was leaving the Rangers behind. The two later briefly returned in Passing of the Torch, in which Tommy, Adam, Kat, and Tanya retired from their Ranger duties. In this episode, Alpha 5 is shown in his original body. This episode would be his last appearance in the franchise, as his role in the Power Rangers series is replaced by Alpha 6. Alpha 5 was last mentioned in the franchise, as the creator of the robotic versions of the Turbo Rangers in the episode "The Robot Ranger".

== Reception ==
Alpha 5 is noted as a "beloved" and "lovable" comic relief character of the Power Rangers franchise by various sources. Joe Anderton from Digital Spy opined that while Alpha 5 looked like he was "made out of whatever props they could find", to him the character's "goofy little walk and head tilt made him feel human and relatable, as if those blinking red lights were eyes". Jessica Lachenal from The Mary Sue thought Alpha 5's appearance, which resembled a Geordi La Forge-style visor which light up whenever he speaks, was "adorable" and "endearing".

== In other media ==
=== Movies ===
==== Mighty Morphin Power Rangers: The Movie ====
Peta-Maree Rixon physically portrayed Alpha 5 as the suit actor for Mighty Morphin Power Rangers: The Movie. Like the film's other character costumes, the Alpha 5 suit Rixon donned was specifically designed for the movie.

==== Turbo: A Power Rangers Movie ====
In Turbo: A Power Rangers Movie, Alpha gains a new, streamlined body. His plating appears to be more reflective, and his lightning bolt was now an arrow pointing straight down.

==== Power Rangers (2017 film) ====
Concept art of Alpha 5, released as a preview to promote the 2017 film Power Rangers.

In the 2017 reboot film, Alpha 5 is a CGI character portrayed by Bill Hader. Hader acted out Alpha 5's movements in a motion-capture suit, and provides the voiced dialogue for the character in the recording booth. To promote the film, Lionsgate launched a "chat bot" app, which features a completely personalized, spontaneous chat with Alpha 5. The app was cross-platform, enabling app users to chat with Alpha 5 on either Facebook Messenger, Kik, or Twitter in the role of a potential Power Ranger candidate, and receive exclusive content for the film as reward for the interaction.

The film's iteration of Alpha 5 has a bio-mechanical look that uses darker hues of the original design's red and blue colors, with a pair of eye stalks dangling from the saucer-shaped head as opposed to a visor. Like his original TV series iteration, Alpha 5 is an android aide of Zordon; however, he has a less convivial relationship with the teenagers and is skeptical of their competence as the new Power Rangers.

Alpha 5's drastically different design from the original iteration received a mixed response, with some journalists labeling it "weird", "horrifying", or "nightmarish". The Los Angeles Times and International Business Times both reported on strong disapproval from series fans in response to the reveal of Alpha 5's redesign. Phillip Martinez from Player One dissented and opined that the redesign, though aesthetically jarring, matched the visual language of the film's Power Rangers iteration.

The decision to cast Hader as Alpha 5 was mostly well received by journalists. Jacob Stolworthy from The Independent considered the casting to be "odd". Joshua Rivera from GQ Magazine expressed his concerns about the film's creation direction, and wondered if Hader would adopt Alpha 5's "classic high-pitched fretting", Alpha 6's "weirdly nasal Long Island stylings", or if he would approach the role as the "latest Stefon joint". Andy Webster, in a review of the 2017 film for The New York Times, commented that "Hader's dialed-down take" of the character "reflects the movie's tempered refinement of the original".

=== Alpha's Magical Christmas ===
Alpha 5 is the main character of Alpha's Magical Christmas, a direct-to-video musical Christmas special produced during Season 2 of Mighty Morphin Power Rangers. The Rangers are away at the North Pole assisting Santa Claus in preparation for the Christmas holidays, while Alpha remains with Zordon for Christmas at the Command Center. Despite Zordon's presence, Alpha feels miserable from his loneliness. Zordon cheers Alpha up by presenting a Christmas tree to him, then follows that up by teleporting a group of children to the Command Center to sing Christmas carols with Alpha. Together they sing such carols as "Good King Wenceslas", "Deck the Halls", "Here We Come A-Caroling", "Jingle Bells" and "Silent Night". After the children leave via the "magical portal", Tommy, Kimberly and Billy teleport to the Command Center in their ranger suits, and the cast perform "We Wish You a Merry Christmas" to end the special.

=== Comics ===
Alpha 5 appears as a recurring character in the Mighty Morphin Power Rangers comic series, published by Boom! Studios. One storyline even introduces Alpha's predecessor, Alpha One, who is more willing to resort to ruthless tactics in the name of victory where Zordon and Alpha 5 prefer a less ruthless approach.

== Promotion and merchandise ==
Like many Power Rangers series characters, various merchandise has been made of Alpha 5 since the inception of the franchise.
