= Trini Kwan =

Yellow Power Ranger character

- Power Rangers character
- Thuy Trang as Trini
- First appearance: Day of the Dumpster (Mighty Morphin Power Rangers)
- Portrayed by: Thuy Trang; Becky G Audri Dubois (pilot)
- Voiced by: Holly Chou (Rita's Rewind)

In-universe information
- Title: Yellow Mighty Morphin Power Ranger
- Children: Minh Kwan (daughter)
- Home: Earth
- Color(s): Yellow
- Status: Alive
- Zords: Sabertooth Tiger Dinozord; Griffin Thunderzord

Trini Kwan is a fictional character from the Power Rangers franchise, first appearing in the original series as the Yellow Ranger (Sabertooth Tiger). She was portrayed by Vietnamese-American actress Thuy Trang.

Trini was originally portrayed by actress Audri Dubois in the unaired pilot episode, but when the show was picked up for television, for which a new pilot was filmed, she was played by Trang, around whom the character was rewritten. A reimagined version of Trini appears in the 2017 reboot film, played by Mexican-American singer Becky G.

== Character biography ==
=== Mighty Morphin Power Rangers ===
==== Season 1 ====
In Mighty Morphin Power Rangers, Trini makes her first appearance performing a Kata in the first episode. When Rita Repulsa escapes and begins wreaking havoc on Earth, Trini, along with her close friends Jason Lee Scott, Zack Taylor, Billy Cranston, and Kimberly Hart, is one of the five teens chosen by Zordon to receive great power, drawn from the spirits of the prehistoric animals. These powers allow them to transform into a fighting force known as the Power Rangers. Trini is chosen for her compassion, quick wits, and martial arts talent, and becomes the Yellow Power Ranger, given the Sabertooth Tiger Power Coin and the Sabertooth Tiger Dinozord.

Trini is well-versed in kung fu. She would later become proficient in the art of Praying Mantis Kung Fu, mirroring Thuy Trang's real-life training in the martial art. Trini's signature fighting style included lightning-fast maneuvers and powerful high kicks. She attempts to neutralize foes with the least amount of force. Trini is one of the intellectuals of the team, often having to translate Billy's techno talk for the other Rangers.

==== Season 2 ====
In Season 2, with the arrival of the new nemesis Lord Zedd, the Rangers are given the new Thunderzords to battle Zedd's monsters, which are significantly more powerful than those created by Rita. Trini is given the new Griffin Thunderzord.

Also, during the earlier part of the season, Trini is courted by a new student in school named Richie. Initially, they both are too nervous about speaking to each other, but eventually, Richie gathers the courage to ask Trini on a study date.

Trini, along with Jason and Zack, are selected as delegates to the World Peace Conference in Switzerland. Zordon selects Aisha as her successor.

==== Mighty Morphin Power Rangers: Once & Always ====
The 2023 Netflix special, Mighty Morphin Power Rangers: Once & Always, set 30 years after Zordon originally recruited the Mighty Morphin' Power Rangers, reveals that Trini resumed her Power Ranger duties after returning from the Peace Conference and has a teenage daughter called Minh (Charlie Kersh).

While attempting to bring Zordon back to life, Billy accidentally restores the evil spirit of Rita Repulsa, which takes over the body of Alpha 8 and becomes Robo-Rita. In the ensuing battle, Rita fires an energy blast at Billy which is intercepted by Trini, killing her in the process. Zack becomes Minh's legal guardian, while Minh begins training in the hope of destroying Rita and avenging her mother.

One year later, Robo-Rita reappears and captures Tommy, Jason, and Kimberly. She plans to drain their energy to power a time machine that will allow her to contact her past self and alter the timeline in her favor. While Zack and Billy lead the remaining Mighty Morphin' Power Rangers to defend Angel Grove and thwart Rita's plan, Minh steals Trini's morpher to join the fight but finds herself unable to use it. Echoing Zordon, Zack counsels her to use her skills to defend life, rather than for revenge.

During the final battle with Robo-Rita, Minh intercepts another one of her attacks to save Billy. This action bonds Minh to the Sabre-Toothed Tiger Power Coin, which shows her mother's memories, saves her and allows her to morph into the new Yellow Mighty Morphin' Power Ranger. Zack uses the Power Axe's cannon mode to destroy Rita once and for all, saying Trini's name before delivering the final blow. Later, Aisha Campbell - who took over as the Yellow Ranger when Trini left for the Peace Conference - congratulates Minh on inheriting the legacy that she once held herself.

Mighty Morphin Power Rangers: Once & Always is dedicated to the memory of Thuy Trang, as well as Tommy Oliver's actor Jason David Frank, who died in November 2022.

=== 2017 film ===
Becky G as Trini in the 2017 film Power Rangers.

In the 2017 film, which is a modern-day reboot of the original Power Rangers series, Trini is portrayed by Mexican-American singer Becky G. She is depicted more closely to what Trini was in the television series pilot when played by Audri Dubois, i.e. as a teen of Mexican origin rather than of Asian origin. The film also portrays Trini as being queer, and as such, she has gained fame for being the first LGBTQ superhero in the film. Trini reveals that Angel Grove is her third school in three years as her family often moved around, but she tends to avoid interaction with others, to the extent that she has been in Kimberly's biology class for a year and Kimberly never noticed her. Trini's issues are made worse by her family's relative normality, as her parents are essentially incapable of acknowledging or accepting her sexuality. However, as she trains with the team, having met them while practicing martial arts in the mine where Billy found the Power Coins, despite them meeting Zordon and Alpha before Zack even asks for her name, she comes to form a closer bond with the group. When Rita attacks Trini on her own and "offers" to spare her if Trini will tell her the location of the Zeo Crystal, Trini warns the rest of the team. After they manage to morph into their ranger suits, Trini joins the other Rangers in attacking Goldar in their zords before they form the Megazord for the first time.

=== Comics ===
==== Mighty Morphin Power Rangers: Pink ====
Kimberly is the main character in this comic book mini-series published by Boom! Studios. The series is a modern-day remake but also serves as a continuation from Kimberly's exit in the third season of Mighty Morphin Power Rangers. Kimberly needs to rescue a French town under siege from Goldar. She seeks help from Zordon who uses the Sword of Light to activate the latent pink energy within her. Kimberly then teleports to Zack and Trini in South America for their help. Zordon uses the Sword of Light to share Kimberly's power with them. Trini once again becomes the Yellow Ranger. It is also revealed that Trini and Zack are in a relationship.

== Development ==
The name Trini was originally used for the character "Trini Crystal" in a 1986 television pilot for an American adaptation of the Super Sentai series Choudenshi Bioman. Described as "an intellectual and struggling artist", the character was portrayed by American actress Tricia Leigh Fisher. Though Bioman was not picked up for a series, the character names of Trini, Zack, Kimberly, and Billy would later be used for Mighty Morphin' Power Rangers.

Early in Season 2, actress Thuy Trang injured her leg while performing a stunt on the show (the cast usually performed their own stunts). In particular, in the episode "The Beetle Invasion" she is notably seen sitting on a bench wearing a knee brace while the other Rangers played the game. Hence the character was unable to participate in most fight scenes and was often absent from other scenes that did not have something to sit on, for the rest of the actress's time on the series.

When Thuy Trang, Austin St. John (Jason), and Walter Jones (Zack) left the show (over contract disputes), their characters stopped making new on-screen or face-to-camera shots, simply being shown in their Ranger uniforms, using archive footage, or with doubles who were not directly facing the cameras, before they were written off in the two-part "Power Transfer" episode in which their characters were chosen to attend the World Peace Conference. Trini urged Zordon that they could not leave during such a crisis, but Zordon advised the transfer as the best decision to make. The Sword of Light transferred Trini's powers to Aisha Campbell. Though Jason later returned in Power Rangers Zeo, Turbo: A Power Rangers Movie, and the tenth anniversary special "Forever Red," it was never stated what became of Zack or Trini after the peace conference.

Unlike Kimberly, Trini did not wear a skirt with her Ranger suit and appears with male anatomical contours in most morphed sequences. This is because the action scenes from the first season of Mighty Morphin used footage from the 1992 Super Sentai television series Kyōryū Sentai Zyuranger. Her counterpart on Zyuranger, Boi, the Tiger Ranger (portrayed by Takumi Hashimoto (橋本 巧, Hashimoto Takumi)), was male. However, a female version of the Tiger Ranger costume was made with a skirt for the 2011 Super Sentai series Kaizoku Sentai Gokaiger, which first appears on the show in Episode 11 due to Luka Millfy/Gokai Yellow being female.

== Reception ==
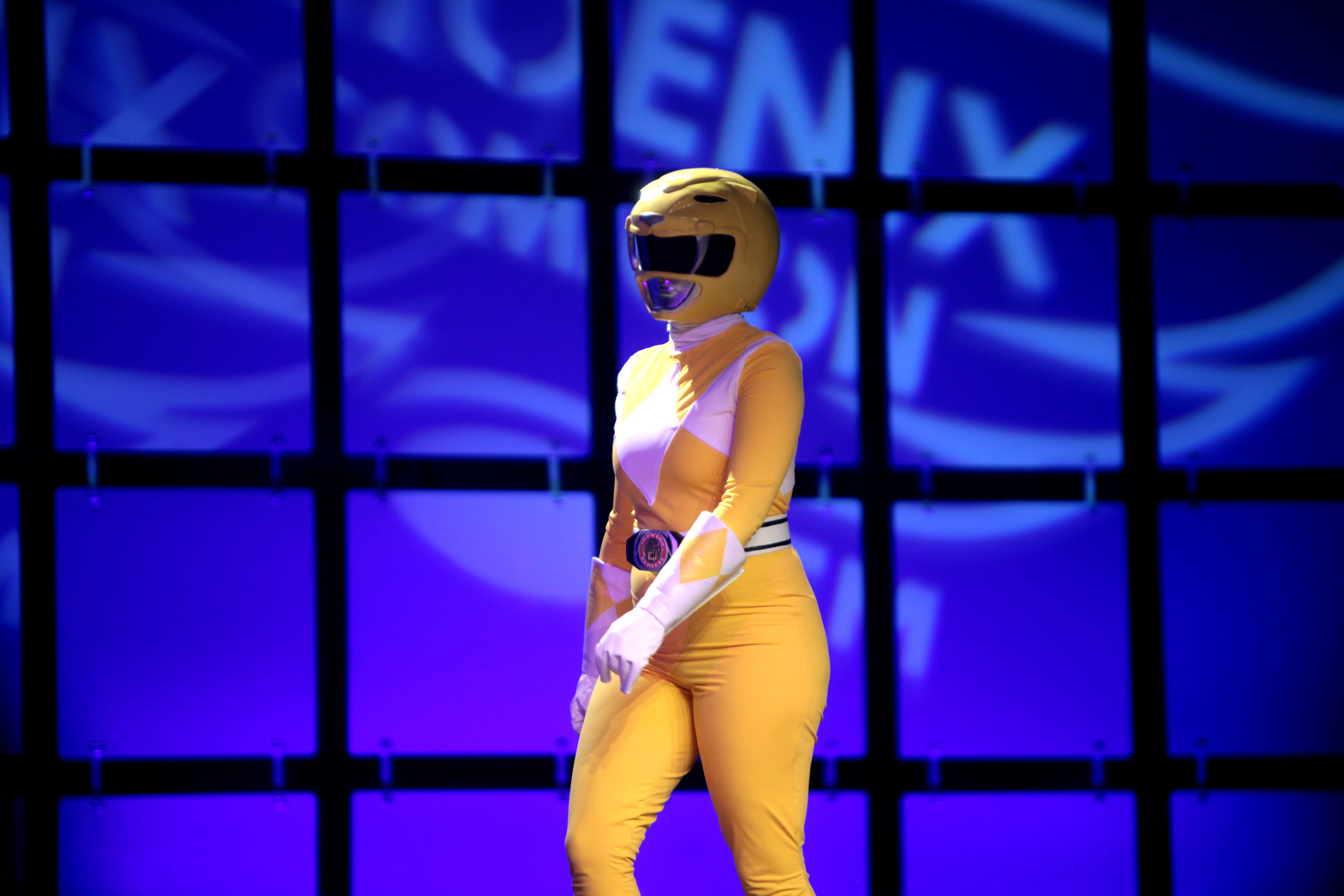
Cosplay of Trini Kwan at Phoenix Comicon Masquerade 2014

The choice of color for the Black Ranger (Zack Taylor) and Yellow Ranger (Trini Kwan) has been a source of criticism, due to the belief these colors are representations of their racial backgrounds. There are many parodies illustrating the perceived inherent racism of the show. According to the producers, this was not noticed until the tenth episode of Mighty Morphin Power Rangers.

Asian-American musician Awkwafina's debut album is named Yellow Ranger in homage to Trini.
