= Mighty Morphin Alien Rangers =

Television series

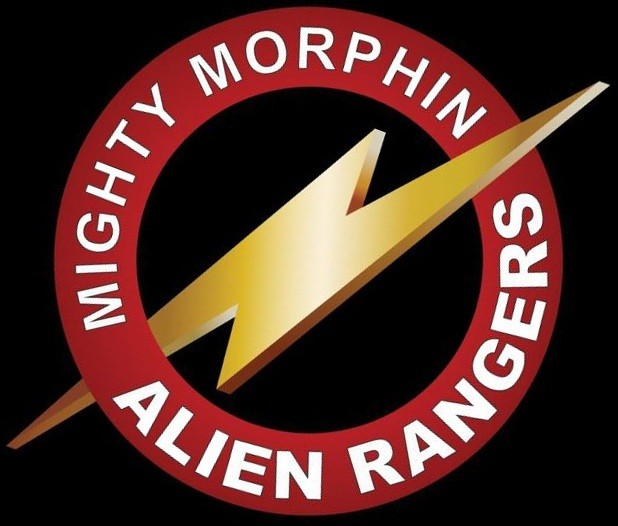
- Genre: Action; Adventure; Science fantasy Superhero
- Created by: Haim Saban; Shuki Levy
- Based on: Ninja Sentai Kakuranger by Toei Company
- Developed by: Saban Entertainment; Toei Company
- Showrunners: Ann Austen; Doug Sloan
- Directed by: Vickie Bronaugh; Larry Litton; Paul Schrier; Robert Radler; Isaac Florentine
- Starring: Catherine Sutherland; Julia Jordan; Johnny Yong Bosch; Matthew Sakimoto; Karan Ashley; Sicily; Steve Cardenas; Michael J. O'Laskey; Jason David Frank; Michael R. Gotto; David Yost; Justin Timsit; Jason Narvy; Ross J. Samya; Paul Schrier; Cody Slaton
- Opening theme: "Go Go Alien Rangers"
- Composers: Shuki Levy; Kussa Mahchi; Ron Wasserman
- Countries of origin: United States; Japan
- No. of episodes: 10

Production
- Executive producers: Haim Saban; Shuki Levy
- Producers: Ronnie Hadar; Jonathan Tzachor
- Production locations: California (Greater Los Angeles Area) (Santa Clarita & Los Angeles); Japan (Greater Tokyo Area) (Tokyo, Saitama, Yokohama and Kyoto)
- Cinematography: Ilan Rosenberg
- Running time: 20 minutes
- Production companies: Saban Entertainment; Renaissance Atlantic Entertainment; Toei Company; MMPR Productions

Original release
- Network: Fox (Fox Kids)
- Release: 5 February – 17 February 1996

Related
- Power Rangers television series

Mighty Morphin Alien Rangers is a 1996 television miniseries and the second entry of the Power Rangers franchise, set immediately after the end of the third season of Mighty Morphin Power Rangers. As with the third season of Mighty Morphin Power Rangers, this miniseries adapted footage and costumes from the eighteenth Super Sentai series, Ninja Sentai Kakuranger.

== Synopsis ==
The five Alien Rangers

Picking up where the third season of Mighty Morphin Power Rangers left off, Master Vile has used the Orb of Doom to reverse the ages of everybody on Earth, including the Power Rangers, reducing them to children. However, unlike the last time, the rangers retain their memories of the proper time thanks to the Ninja Power Coins. Unfortunately, the rangers are unable to morph and fight; Zordon recruits the Alien Rangers of the planet Aquitar for help. These Rangers are humanoid, partially aquatic aliens and though Earth's environment is ultimately inhospitable to them, they agree to help. Master Vile's plans are foiled, and he leaves in annoyance, but Lord Zedd and Rita Repulsa remain and intend to conquer Earth.

Hoping to restore the Rangers' proper ages, Billy Cranston builds a Regenerator powered by the Ninja Power Coins. However, only Billy is restored to normal before the device is stolen by Goldar and Rito Revolto. The Power Coins are then destroyed by Rita and Zedd. With the human Rangers' powers destroyed, only the Aquitian Rangers stand between Earth and the forces of evil, and they can't stay on Earth forever. Ultimately, Zordon realizes that only one thing can restore everything to normal: the Zeo Crystal, which the human Rangers had split into five sub-crystals and scattered throughout time to keep it safe from Master Vile.

The five young Rangers are each sent back to a different country and point in time to find a sub-crystal. Upon success, they are returned to the present. All the while, the Aquitian Rangers, Billy, Zordon and Alpha 5 fend off the forces of Lord Zedd and Rita. The villains also plot to destroy the Command Center and steal the completed Zeo Crystal.

Ultimately, Zedd and Rita succeed in summoning the Aquitian Rangers' arch-foe, Hydro Hog, to destroy them. After a great deal of difficulty, the Aquitian Rangers destroy him. Meanwhile, Aisha Campbell acquires the final sub-crystal in Africa. However, she chooses to remain in exchange for the sub-crystal and new friend Tanya Sloan goes in her place. Once the Zeo Crystal is recombined in a machine devised by Billy, Earth is restored to normal. The teenaged Rangers bid thanks and farewell to their Aquitian counterparts, who return to Aquitar. However, Goldar and Rito Revolto steal the Zeo Crystal out of the Command Center and their bomb goes off soon afterwards. The Rangers are teleported to safety just before the Command Center is destroyed.

=== Aftermath ===
The series sets up the transition from Mighty Morphin Power Rangers to Power Rangers Zeo. The two-part premiere of the latter resolved the cliffhanger ending and established the Rangers' new powers (as well as new foes, the Machine Empire).

Mighty Morphin Alien Rangers not only ensured the transition to Power Rangers Zeo in the story; it also helped the franchise through a critical moment in its industrial evolution.

The Aquitian Rangers are later seen or referenced in further seasons. Cestro returns unmorphed in "Graduation Blues", seeking Billy's help against the Hydro-Contaminators. Cestro later briefly appears with Delphine in "Revelations of Gold". The Aquitian and Zeo Rangers team-up in the "Rangers of Two Worlds" two-parter, the first instance on the series of two full teams appearing together. The two-parter also centered around Billy rapidly aging because of his use of the regenerator. In "Countdown to Destruction" in Power Rangers in Space, the Aquitian Rangers battle and are overwhelmed by Divatox's forces. Aurico later appears morphed in the Power Rangers Wild Force episode, "Forever Red", which saw every previous Red Ranger (save Rocky, as Jason returned to his previous role as Red Ranger, for which Rocky originally replaced him) united to stop the remnants of the Machine Empire. All five Rangers would later return in the series finale of Power Rangers Super Megaforce to battle alongside other veteran Ranger teams and the Megaforce Rangers.

== Characters ==
=== Aquitian Rangers ===
- Aurico
  The Red Aquitian Ranger, portrayed by David Bacon. Aurico leads the Rangers in battle, and devises strategies that ensure victory. His symbol is the circle and he uses ninjutsu to vanish from one place and appear in another to dodge his enemies. He pilots the Red Battle Borg and, during his stay on Earth, the Red Shogunzord, as well. Years later he joined nine other Red Rangers to fight the Machine Empire on the moon. He did not appear unmorphed in this episode, and was voiced by Christopher Glenn.
- Corcus
  The Black Aquitian Ranger, portrayed by Alan Palmer. He is the quietest member of the team, often lurking in the background, but fights with extreme ferocity against his enemies. The Black Aquitian Ranger's symbol is the pentagon. He controls the Black Battle Borg and the Black Shogunzord.
- Cestro
  The Blue Aquitian Ranger, portrayed by Karim Prince. Cestro is the brains of the team. A master of technology, he creates weapons and devices that get the Aquitian Rangers out of tough situations. He is entrusted with the power of the Blue Battleborg and Blue Shogunzord. The Blue Aquitian Ranger's symbol is the square. His special attack is called the Aquitar Water Fall.
- Tideus
  The Yellow Aquitian Ranger, portrayed by Jim Gray. He is a very strong and levelheaded individual. He is also the first male Yellow Ranger, a tradition which occurs frequently in the Sentai counterpart, but does not happen again in the American releases until Dustin becomes the Yellow Wind Ranger in Power Rangers Ninja Storm several years later. Tideus was entrusted with the power of the Yellow Battle Borg and the Yellow Shogunzord. The Yellow Aquitian Ranger's symbol is the triangle. He can send yellow triangular energy beams at his enemies (created by slashing his sword through the air in a triangular motion).
- Delphine
  The White Aquitian Ranger, the leader of the Alien Rangers, portrayed by Rajia Baroudi. She is the first female leader and White Ranger. Her symbol is the arrow (left-pointing on her helmet's forehead, downward-pointing on her visor). She pilots the White Battle Borg and the White Shogunzord. Delphine has more endurance and can survive far longer outside of water than the other Aquitians.

=== Allies ===
- Billy Cranston
  He is portrayed as a child by Justin Timsit and as a teenager by David Yost.
- Thomas "Tommy" Oliver
  He is portrayed as a child by Michael R. Gotto and as a teenager by Jason David Frank.
- Rocky DeSantos
  He is portrayed as a child by Michael J. O'Laskey and as a teenager by Steve Cardenas.
- Aisha Campbell
  She is portrayed as a child by Sicily Sewell and as a teenager by Karan Ashley.
- Adam Park
  He is portrayed as a child by Matthew Sakimoto and as a teenager by Johnny Yong Bosch.
- Katherine "Kat" Hillard
  She is portrayed as a child by Julia Jordan and as a teenager by Catherine Sutherland.
- Tanya Sloan
  She is portrayed as a child by Khanya Mkhize and as a teenager by Nakia Burrise.
- Zordon
  He is voiced by Robert L. Manahan.
- Alpha 5
  He is voiced by Richard Steven Horvitz (credited as Richard Wood).
- Farkus "Bulk" Bulkmeier
  He is portrayed as a child by Cody Slaton and as a teenager by Paul Schrier.
- Eugene "Skull" Skullovitch
  He is portrayed as a child by Ross J. Samya and as a teenager by Jason Narvy.

=== Villains ===
- Master Vile
  He is voiced by Simon Prescott.
- Rita Repulsa
  She is portrayed by Carla Perez and voiced by Barbara Goodson.
- Lord Zedd
  He is portrayed by Ed Neil and voiced by Robert Axelrod.
- Goldar
  He is voiced by Kerrigan Mahan.
- Rito Revolto
  He is voiced by Bob Papenbrook.
- Squatt
  He is voiced by Michael Sorich (credited as Michael J. Sorich).
- Baboo
  He is voiced by Dave Mallow (credited as Colin Phillips).
- Finster
  He is voiced by Robert Axelrod.
- Hydro Hog
  A known enemy of the Aquitan Rangers. He is voiced by Brad Orchard.
- Monsters (note: all voice actors uncredited)
  - Parrot Top
    He is voiced by Matt K. Miller.
  - See-Monster
    He is voiced by Brian Tahash.
  - Crabby Cabbie
    He is voiced by Michael Sorich.
  - Garbage Mouth
    He is voiced by Matt K. Miller.
  - Brick Bully
    He is voiced by Richard Epcar the first time and by Brian Tahash the second time.
  - Professor Longnose
    He is voiced by Kirk Thornton.
  - Slotsky
    He is voiced by Jimmy Theodore.
  - Eric and Merrick, The Barbaric Brothers
    Voice actors Michael Sorich.
  - Bratboy
    He is voiced by Paul Schrier.
  - Witchblade
    She is voiced by Wendee Lee.
  - Arachnofiend
    She is voiced by Julie Maddalena.

== Episodes ==
No.	Title	Directed by	Written by	Original release date	Prod. code
1	"Alien Rangers of Aquitar"	Vickie Bronaugh	Shuki Levy & Shell Danielson	5 February 1996	334
2	"Alien Rangers of Aquitar"	Vickie Bronaugh	Shuki Levy & Shell Danielson	6 February 1996	335
Part 1: Zedd, Rita, Goldar and Rito land on Earth to destroy Angel Grove, but Master Vile puts a stop to it. He plans to have other villains destroy Angel Grove, which he reveals to the four, as well as Crabby Cabbie, See Monster, Brick Bully's second form, Miss Chief, Lanterra, and an assortment of unnamed monsters. Meanwhile, our heroes are trapped as their younger selves. But trouble is just ahead when Rito and the Tengas show up. Then confusion ensues when the police arrive. At the Command Centre, Zordon is unable to communicate with Ninjor, so he and Alpha must contact Aquitar and seek the assistance of the Alien Rangers. Part 2: Alpha manages to defuse the bomb that Rito and Goldar set up to blow up the Command Center. The young Rangers greet their Alien Ranger allies before they do battle against Master Vile's minion Professor Longnose and a weapon-upgraded Crabby Cabbie, See Monster, Garbage Mouth, Brick Bully's second form, and Parrot Top. After being defeated, Master Vile throws a tantrum and flees to Gamma Vile, much to Zedd's joy.
3	"Climb Every Fountain"	Larry Litton	Douglas Sloan	7 February 1996	336
Young Billy and the Alien Rangers work together on a regenerator device to return the young Rangers to normal. Meanwhile, Zedd and Rita develop a plot to defeat the Rangers that involves Zedd transforming the regenerator device into Slotsky. Then, Rito decides to take a bus in an attempt to take their Ninja Power Coins away. Then, suddenly, the Alien Rangers start feeling under the weather.
4	"The Alien Trap"	Larry Litton	Stewart St. John	8 February 1996	337
The kids work on a new device called the Molecular Hydro-Atmospheric Generator that will help the Alien Rangers. Suddenly, Rito and Goldar appear, and the Alien Rangers defend their young friends. Zedd and Rita dispatch the Barbaric Brothers to pollute the lake.
5	"Attack of the 60' Bulk"	Paul Schrier	Gilles Wheeler	9 February 1996	338
Our young heroes receive good news about the Alien Rangers. Meanwhile, Lord Zedd and Rita Repulsa are ecstatic. Then, they devise a plan to turn Bulk into Bratboy. Soon, they grow annoyed of the monster still acting like a boy and change him back. Rito and Goldar are sent to the underground part of the Command Center.
6	"Water You Thinking?"	Paul Schrier	Jackie Marchand	12 February 1996	339
The young Rangers begin their quest to find the shattered pieces of the Zeo Crystal, but at the start of their journey, Cestro begins to dehydrate. Rita and Zedd conspire to keep the Alien Rangers dry, as well as keeping them from summoning their Battle Borgs which involves the use of Zedd's old friend Witchblade. Meanwhile, Rocky searches for a Zeo Crystal shard within a volcano in historic Mexico. Rito and Goldar find themselves lost in the underground level of the Command Center and separate, but the results are what you expect.
7	"Along Came a Spider"	Robert Radler	Buzz Alden & Charlotte Fullerton	13 February 1996	340
While Billy searches for some spare parts in his garage to be used for the machine needed for the Zeo Crystal, Young Adam arrives in historic Korea to begin his quest. Meanwhile, Rita and Lord Zedd have big plans for one pesky spider in an attempt to slow down the Rangers' progress as Zedd transforms it into Arachnofiend.
8	"Sowing the Seas of Evil"	Robert Radler	Stewart St. John	14 February 1996	341
While Young Tommy and Young Katherine begin their quests, Billy and the Aquitian Rangers learn about Rita and Zedd's plan to bring a new danger to Earth: the Hydro Hog. To prevent Hydro Hog's arrival on Earth, Billy works with Alpha to create a device to prevent Zedd from succeeding. Rito and Goldar are still lost and arguing over who has to hold the implosion device that Zedd gave them to place inside.
9	"Hogday Afternoon"	Isaac Florentine	Shuki Levy & Shell Danielson	15 February 1996	342
10	"Hogday Afternoon"	Isaac Florentine	Shuki Levy & Shell Danielson	17 February 1996	343
Part 1: Aisha's quest begins in Africa. Meanwhile, Lord Zedd seeks the Zeo Crystal for himself. Also, he summons the evil Hydro Hog. His assignment: get the Rangers. Rito and Goldar finally find the underground base, but they accidentally activate the device. Part 2: Aisha's quest ends, but she decides to stay in Africa to help the sick animals. She sends a young girl named Tanya Sloan back in her place with the final piece of the Zeo Crystal. The Alien Rangers defeat the Hydro Hog, and Earth is rotated forward in time. The planet is now back where it belongs in time, and all the Power Rangers are restored to their original ages... and Tanya has also grown into a young teenager. As for Aisha, she herself is now a teenager again and is living in Africa, but then Rito and Goldar steal the now complete Zeo Crystal, and the Command Center blows up.

== Home media ==
The Mighty Morphin Power Rangers: The Complete Series boxset from Shout! Factory released on 11 July 2012 (through San Diego Comic-Con), 13 August 2012 (through Time Life), and 20 November 2012 (at wide retail). All 10 episodes of Alien Rangers are featured on the fifth disc included in the Mighty Morphin Power Rangers Season 3 DVD case of said boxset, marking the series as season 3.5. The boxset was re-released on 18 October 2016 (at wide retail) with new cover art packaging for the set, but is otherwise identical to the previous 2012 releases. On 7 August 2018 a new version of the boxset released featuring a "25th Anniversary" Steelbook and included Mighty Morphin Power Rangers: The Movie on Blu-ray (the rest of the set is still DVD).

On 24 September 2013, the complete Mighty Morphin Alien Rangers series was released individually onto DVD. On 13 August 2019 a new version of Mighty Morphin Power Rangers Season 3 was released in a steelbook case with all 10 episodes of Alien Rangers on an extra fifth disc.

The series was also later included in the 20 season limited edition Power Rangers: Legacy boxset released on 2 January 2014.

== See also ==
- List of Mighty Morphin Power Rangers home video releases
- Mighty Morphin Power Rangers
- Mighty Morphin Power Rangers (video game)
- Ninja Sentai Kakuranger
- Power Rangers
- Power Rangers Turbo
- Power Rangers Zeo
