= Goldar =

Fictional character

- Power Rangers character
- First appearance: Day of the Dumpster (Mighty Morphin Power Rangers)
- Last appearance: Grid Connection, (Power Rangers Beast Morphers)
- Portrayed by: Takashi Sakamoto (MMPR Season 1 and 2); Kazutoshi Yokoyama (MMPR Season 3, Zeo, In Space); Danny Wayne Stallcup (MMPR Season 1 and 2); David Wald (MMPR Season 3); Kerry Casey (Mighty Morphin Power Rangers: The Movie)
- Voiced by: Kerrigan Mahan; Nolan North (Power Rangers: Super Legends); Fred Tatasciore (2017 film); Paul Harrop (Power Rangers Beast Morphers; as Goldar Maximus in "Making Bad"); Adrian Smith (Power Rangers Beast Morphers; as Goldar Maximus in "Grid Connection"); James Willems (Rita's Rewind)

In-universe information
- Species: Manticore monster (TV series); Gold monster (2017 film)
- Weapon: Gold Sword
- Home: Titan
- Zords: Cyclopsis

Goldar (known as Flydar in the pilot episode) is a fictional character from the television series Mighty Morphin Power Rangers. A powerful yet overconfident warrior that serves under the command of Rita Repulsa and Lord Zedd, he is one of the chief antagonists of the titular protagonists in the show's first three seasons. Goldar is based on the Kyōryū Sentai Zyuranger villain Grifforzar (also spelled as Grifforzer or Griforza by some sources).

Goldar has been portrayed by numerous actors: in the Sentai footage repurposed for the Power Rangers, the Japanese actors who physically portrayed the character were Takashi Sakamoto for non-action scenes and Kazutoshi Yokoyama for battle sequences; while in original footage produced by Saban Entertainment, Goldar was physically portrayed by Danny Wayne Stallcup for the first two seasons, and by David Wald and several other actors during season three. Goldar is voiced by Kerrigan Mahan in every major adaptation of the show since the franchise's inception until the 2007 video game Power Rangers: Super Legends where the character is voiced by Nolan North.

A reimagined version of Goldar is voiced by Fred Tatasciore in the 2017 reboot film. A more powerful and reincarnated version of Goldar known as Goldar Maximus appears in two episodes of Season 2 of Power Rangers Beast Morphers, voiced by Paul Harrop and Adrian Smith respectively.

Various merchandise for the character, as with other of the series' characters, has been released since the inception of the Power Rangers franchise.

== Character overview ==
Goldar is depicted as a bipedal Manticore-like alien from Titan, who wields a sword, and wears a gold-plated suit of "Titanian Armor", with a matching helmet which looks like a mix of ancient Greek and Egyptian visual design. He had red eyes, a long mane, a lion-like snout, a scorpion-like tail, and speaks in a gravelly voice. He originally served Lord Zedd long ago, and was later assigned to serve Rita prior to their imprisonment on the Moon. He is usually depicted as the obsequious commander of Rita and Zedd's minions, the Putty Patrol (or Putties), to frighten and distract the Power Rangers. The Putties are typically used as a diversion for Goldar's masters to further their plans, and Goldar would often engage in speculation as to the likelihood of said plan's success.

Goldar is portrayed as a formidable enemy in the show's pilot episode and often depicted in the show's early seasons as capable of holding his own against the entire Power Ranger team and defeat them single-handedly unlike many of their opponents. In later seasons of the series, Goldar's characterization became less threatening and more comical in nature.

== Creation and development ==
Concept art of Grifforzar from Kyōryū Sentai Zyuranger.

Much of the footage for the Mighty Morphin Power Rangers series was taken from the Japanese TV show Kyōryū Sentai Zyuranger and used as the basis for its costumes, Zords, and villains. Scenes were shot with North American actors and spliced together with recycled footage from Zyuranger together to make a brand new show with radically different plots and storylines.

Goldar's design was initially identical to the original character design for his Zyuranger counterpart Grifforzar, which is visually similar to a manticore: a humanoid face, the body of a lion, and the tail of a scorpion. From the first episode, "Day of the Dumpster", to "Lions and Blizzards", the Goldar costume looked like Grifforzar, where the snout would move awkwardly whenever the character is talking. Goldar's costume was revised in the show's second season, with more realistic skin, long fangs, and a mouth that could fully move, though the old iteration of Goldar with the rising snout would occasionally appear in recycled footage.

In addition to the changes in his facial appearance, the revised costume has a permanent pair of extended wings. Although Goldar is shown with the ability to fly in early episodes, the wings on the Sentai original costume were designed to fold behind the character. The bird-like wings later disappear for reasons not explained within the season, though the show's writers later addressed this by making the wings symbolic. When Goldar defects from Rita upon Lord Zedd's arrival in "The Mutiny, Part I", Zedd uses his staff to restore Goldar's wings as a reward for his loyalty. It was implied that Rita had taken them away as punishment for the character's repeated failures against the Rangers, which was confirmed when he lost his wings during the Power Rangers Zeo series.

Mahan initially used a gruff, growling voice for Goldar's, but he could not sustain the voice which eventually took a toll on his vocal cords; while experimenting with different voices, he came up with a voice that was more low-pitched and grumbly. Mahan's original high pitched voice for Goldar can still be heard in later episodes, particularly in recycled scenes where Goldar would fight or grow to giant size, as the showrunners did not re-dub any recycled footage.

== Appearances ==
=== Mighty Morphin Power Rangers ===
Goldar led Rita Repulsa's first invasion against Earth. However, he has soon faced the Power Rangers and was beaten by their Megazord after an intense fight. Ever since then, Goldar is a recurring opponent of the Rangers and their Zords, developing a particular vendetta for Jason Lee Scott and Tommy Oliver, the Red and Green Rangers respectively. In the first season he is often berated by Rita for his failures, who calls him by a variety of derogatory names. This pattern also happened when Lord Zedd was introduced as well; in addition to insulting the now apparently incompetent golden warrior, he often blamed Goldar for his own failures and had a habit of silencing him frequently. Goldar also pilots a Zord known as Cyclopsis, an ancient war machine owned by Rita, but the Zord was defeated by the Rangers' Ultrazord after a prolonged battle. He was also one of Bulk and Skull's more memorable encounters with a monster, where he picked up a bus with the duo inside while giant-sized.

When Lord Zedd arrived on Rita's Moon palace in the second season, Goldar eagerly defected and regained his wings in the process. As Zedd's right-hand man, Goldar led many missions for him, repeatedly encountering Tommy (now the White Ranger). Each time they fought, the White Ranger would best him, sending Goldar back to Zedd in disgrace. Rita later returned to the Moon and successfully seduced Zedd into marrying her as part of her plan of usurping Zedd. When he later discovered it was a cover for Rita's plot, he immediately made Finster create an antidote for the love spell that Rita used. Goldar discovered to his dismay that Zedd had come to love Rita on his own, even after the antidote has been applied. In the third season, Goldar is often paired with Rita's brother Rito Revolto and is often disgusted by his buffoonish behavior. Goldar was also essential in Lord Zedd's powering of the Shogun Zords, as he defeated the Power Rangers' ally Ninjor, allowing Zedd to capture and use him as a power source for the Zords.

=== Mighty Morphin Alien Rangers ===
In the Mighty Morphin Alien Rangers mini-series, which sets up the transition from Mighty Morphin Power Rangers to Power Rangers Zeo, Goldar and Rito plant a bomb outside of the Command Center, but it is defused by Alpha 5. Goldar also played a role in the destruction of the Ninja power coins, but only after Billy returned to his normal age. Later, Goldar and Rito were sent to the Command Center, having been given a map of the Command Center's basement, and attempted to destroy the Command Center with an implosion device. The bomb went off and destroyed the Command Center. Just before the implosion device went off, Goldar steals the Zeo Crystal with the help of Rito.

=== Power Rangers Zeo ===
In Power Rangers Zeo, the Rangers discovered the Zeo Crystal in the ruins of the Command Center, surmising that Rito and Goldar must have dropped it. An amnesiac Goldar, who also lost his wings along with his memories, is later seen wandering around Angel Grove along with Rito. As Zedd and Rita flee from the Machine Empire, one of their Tenga Warriors is seen carrying Goldar's detached wings after his failure to destroy the Rangers, despite successfully blowing up the Command Center. They eventually encountered Bulk and Skull and ended up becoming their butlers in exchange for food and shelter. Zedd and Rita eventually found them and restored their memories with Zedd also restoring Goldar's wings. They returned to their masters and helped them in their quest to destroy the Machine Empire.

=== Power Rangers in Space ===
Goldar was last seen in the final episode of Power Rangers in Space, "Countdown to Destruction". Unlike Rito, Goldar went with Zedd and Rita to the Cimmerian Planet for Dark Specter's conference, where he was responsible for revealing Andros' identity as a Power Ranger by removing his cloak. He was later present in their invasion of the Vica Galaxy, helping to subdue the Gold Ranger. Goldar's final fate was not shown among the other villains but he was confirmed destroyed following Zordon's destruction as the subsequent energy wave.

=== Power Rangers Beast Morphers ===
Goldar's sword is one of the many villain relics in Ryjack's collection that are acquired by Venjix/Evox and his minions as they had to choose which villain's weapon to use the Re-Animizer on. Following the death of most of Sledge's crew at the hands of the Beast Morpher Rangers, Evox chose Goldar to be revived and ordered Scrozzle uses Ryjack's Re-Animizer on Goldar's sword. This reincarnated Goldar as an even more powerful version of the original known as Goldar Maximus. Upon learning that Evox/Venjix is the one who resurrected him, Goldar Maximus pledges his loyalty to Evox/Venjix. The recently revived Sledge mocks him by saying he has more strength in his toenail causing Goldar Maximus to attack him. Evox/Venjix have no more use for Sledge then orders Goldar Maximus to kill Sledge in which he proceeds to do despite Sledge pleading with them.

Goldar Maximus is finally destroyed by Team Mighty Morphin, Team Dino Thunder and Team Dino Charge Rangers.

== Reception ==
Goldar is considered to be one of the Power Ranger franchise's most notable villains, and his original iteration's appearance is considered to be recognizable. Loryn Stone from Nerdbot was of the view that Goldar stood out from the rest of the Power Ranger's ensemble cast of characters as a "legitimately terrifying" antagonist. She praised Goldar's characterization and depiction in Mighty Morphin Power Rangers, and considered him to be the show's most definitive villain.

== In other media ==
=== Movies ===
==== Mighty Morphin Power Rangers: The Movie ====
Goldar in the 1995 film Mighty Morphin Power Rangers: The Movie.

Goldar appears as a thoroughly bumbling sidekick who serves Lord Zedd and Rita Repulsa and does not carry a sword, unlike his television counterpart. His suit was specifically created for the movie and was of much higher quality than the ones seen in the show, as it allowed the character's face to be more expressive and had increased flexibility that allowed the actor to move naturally.

Goldar accompanies Zedd and Rita to Earth, where they release the sorcerer Ivan Ooze from his egg-like prison. Goldar and his cohort Mordant defect to Ooze immediately after he traps both Rita and Zedd in a snowglobe and deprives them of their powers. He serves Ooze as his right-hand man while the sorcerer brainwashes the Adults in Angel Grove and helps in instructing them on digging up Ivan's war machines the Ecto-Morphicon Titans. He flees Earth for the Moon after Ivan merges with Hornitor in an attempt to defeat the resurgent Power Rangers.

In a mid-credits scene, Goldar had taken over the Moon palace and calls himself King Goldar, after Ivan Ooze's demise. He lounges on Zedd's throne being served by Mordant, only to panic when Zedd and Rita unexpectedly appear.

==== Power Rangers (2017 film) ====
A Goldar action figure, released to promote the 2017 film Power Rangers.

"I said with my production designer language lets sort of push the envelope on him. And it seemed to start ... and I said, we always have to go back to the mythology we're creating. And the mythology that we are creating is that Rita can ... has control over elements around her. And if she has control over the elements around her that's how she physicalizes and creates the Putties that are then made out of whatever environment is around her and that logic should hold true to Goldar and Goldar then should then come out of this debunked gold mine that the whole movie is set around."

— Dean Israelite, "Power Rangers Director Explains Goldar's Redesign".

Goldar is the secondary antagonist in the 2017 movie reboot with his vocal effects provided by Fred Tatasciore. He appears as a giant gargoyle-like monster made purely out of gold. In an interview with Entertainment Weekly, director Dean Israelite envisioned Goldar to be a kaiju-like beast that would be a physical manifestation of Rita's evil, as opposed to an individual with a distinct personality. Israelite and production designer Andrew Menzies said Goldar is a faceless and intimidating extension of Rita which is nigh unstoppable, and designed the creature's look after a chocolate fountain with a melting form that never takes shape. Menzies commented, "I think as humans we always search for character in a face, and if it's always shifting and changing, it becomes scary".

In the film's narrative, Goldar was created by Rita to penetrate the force field that protects the Zeo Crystal. Goldar's molecular essence was scattered after he was vaporized by Zordon into a cloud of microscopic gold particles during the opening action sequence on Ancient Earth. Rita reconstitutes Goldar by stealing gold from jewelry stores, buildings, and even dental implants to manifest the monster. As Rita orders Goldar to retrieve the Zeo Crystal from underneath the local Krispy Kreme shop, the Rangers confront him with their Zords for the first time, which culminates in them assembling the Megazord. Rita attempts to counter them by merging herself with Goldar directly, but the Rangers are able to destroy the monster enough to send Rita flying towards the Moon.

A preview of Goldar's appearance, in the form of a tie-in action figure for the 2017 film has generated commentary about the film's visual direction, with various sources noting his gold-centric character design as one of the biggest departures from the 1990s series. Otterson described the iteration as "someone took an old Goldar action figure and put it through a few popcorn cycles on a microwave". Other sources have described his appearance as a "melting candle of gold", "a giant chocolate fountain", "a golem formed out of molten, melted gold", and "someone took the classic Goldar and drowned him in nacho cheese."

=== Comics ===
Goldar appears as a recurring character in the Mighty Morphin Power Rangers comic series, published by Boom! Studios. The comic series revealed that Goldar once had a gorilla-like brother named Silverback, and they both served Lord Zedd as the emperor where they were both classified as being from an alien primate race (this is a call-back to the times when Goldar was called a monkey in the TV series). At one point, Silverback tries to overthrow Zedd. Silverback is gravely wounded by Zedd who instructs Goldar to finish off his own brother with his sword. Goldar complies without much hesitation. In a later issue, Goldar became a member of a new incarnation of the Dark Rangers where he operated as the Yellow Dark Ranger.

=== Video games ===
Goldar has appeared in multiple iterations of Power Rangers video games.

He serves as the main villain in the Mighty Morphin' section of the game Power Rangers: Super Legends voiced by Nolan North. He is first seen complaining about Rita making him do her dirty work. Lord Zedd then appears in a time hole and tells him to contaminate Angel Grove's water supply, zombifying everyone there to form an army of Z-Putties. Goldar follows Zedd's demands, however, the Power Rangers are hot on his tail. The "chase" ends at Angel Grove, where Goldar is ready to contaminate the water supply, however, the Power Rangers stop him and he is forced to grow. He is defeated in the Megazord battle.

=== Stage play ===
Goldar appeared in Mighty Morphin' Power Rangers Live, a traveling stage show featuring voice recordings of the entire cast of the TV series for their lines and scenes, with different actors playing all the characters on stage.

=== Promotion and merchandise ===
Like many Power Rangers series characters, various merchandise has been made of Goldar since the inception of the franchise. An exclusive figure to video game retailer GameStop was released as part of the Power Rangers Lightning Collection. The action figure features Goldar's trademark sword and battle FX accessories, as well as fully articulated wings. Goldar's iteration in the 2017 reboot film was recreated as an action figure for the Power Rangers Movie Interactive Megazord series by Bandai.
