= List of Power Rangers Lost Galaxy characters =

Power Rangers Lost Galaxy is an American television series and the seventh season of the Power Rangers franchise, based on the Super Sentai series Seijuu Sentai Gingaman. The series aired for 45 episodes on Fox Kids from February 6 to December 18, 1999.

== Galaxy Power Rangers ==
The Galaxy Power Rangers gain their powers through use of the Quasar Sabers - five ancient swords that were discovered on the planet Mirinoi. At the beginning of the series, the Quasar Sabers are pulled from a block of stone (mirroring the legend of Excalibur), thus highlighting the youths as the modern-day chosen wielders of the weapons (that is, with the exception of Leo Corbett, whose Saber is given to him by his brother Mike).

The Rangers protect the space colony Terra Venture from the alien villains Scorpius, Trakeena and Deviot. This was the first (and so far only) incarnation of Power Rangers that did not have some connection to Earth, save that they depart Earth in the first episode.

The Lost Galaxy Rangers make a cameo in the footage in Power Rangers Beast Morphers.

=== Leo Corbett ===
Leo Corbett is a stowaway aboard the space colony who wanted to follow his older brother, Mike, to find a new world. He largely witnesses the discovery of the Quasar Sabers by accident. Mike originally draws the Red Quasar Saber but passes it on to Leo before he falls to his apparent death at the bottom of a crevice - this passing allows Leo to become the Red Galaxy Ranger and serve as the team's leader. Fittingly for his element (Fire), Leo has shown to be very hot-headed and impulsive at times, although this changes as the series progresses.

Throughout the series, Leo's arsenal includes:

- A Quasar Cannon for each Rangers.
- Each Galaxy Rangers' Transdagger morphs into a personal weapon - for Leo, his Transdagger is the Magna Talon.
- An Astro Cycle each for Leo, Kai and Damon.
- A Jet Jammer for each Rangers.
- Armor Keys (to become his Battlizer transformation, Red Armored Ranger).
- Red Capsular Cycle (which he gains through understanding his Galactabeast).
- Lights of Orion power-up transformation shared by all the Rangers.

He also pilots the Lion Galactabeast/Galactazord.

When the Magna Defender sacrifices himself and Mike is freed, Leo considers giving his powers and Quasar Saber back to his brother, but Mike says it was Leo's destiny to become the Red Ranger. In the finale, Leo single-handedly destroys Trakeena's green insectoid form, sacrificing his Battilizer form in the process - he blasts her at point-blank range, destroying his armor and nearly destroying himself.

When Triskull and his ghouls invade Mirinoi, Leo takes on the mantle of Red Ranger for a second time and follows him to Earth where he helps the Lightspeed Rescue Rangers defeat him and, once again, Trakeena (who had somehow survived the blast). Leo is shown to be able to draw his Quasar Saber from the stone, something he had never done.

During the Power Rangers Wild Force episode "Forever Red", Leo is recruited by Tommy Oliver to journey to the moon with nine other Red Rangers to destroy the Machine Empire - Leo draws his Quasar Saber for a third time.

Leo appeared as a returning Ranger in the finale of Power Rangers Super Megaforce helping the current team finish off the final attack by the Armada.

Leo is played by Danny Slavin and voiced by Eric Artell in the Power Rangers: Super Legends video game.

=== Damon Henderson ===
Damon Henderson is the Green Galaxy Ranger after he draws the Green Quasar Saber. He is a senior mechanic on Terra Venture and the Astro Megaship before Kai takes the ship to Mirinoi to save Leo Corbett and the others. Damon's wisecracking and playful nature can be deceiving. Although he is always ready with a quick comeback or witty remark, he takes his job as the Green Ranger very seriously. A top-notch mechanic, Damon's knowledge of the Astro Megaship is an invaluable asset to the team. His training as an amateur boxer gives him an extra edge when fighting the forces of evil.

Throughout the series, Damon's arsenal includes:

- A Quasar Cannon for each Ranger.
- Each Rangers' Transdagger morphs into a personal weapon - for Damon, his Transdagger is the Trans-Blaster.
- An Astro Cycle each for Leo, Kai and Damon.
- A Jet Jammer for each Rangers.
- Lights of Orion power-up transformation shared by all the Rangers.

He also pilots the Condor Galactabeast/Galactazord.

After the Rangers and the residents of the colony arrive on Mirinoi, Damon joins the others in returning his Quasar Saber to its stone - he draws it again when he joins his teammates in battling Trakeena on Earth and a third time when they join an army of veteran Rangers in aiding the Megaforce Rangers in their final battle with the Warstar Armada.

Damon is shown to have been captured and imprisoned in Drakkon's tower during the events of "Shattered Grid", his cell being across from Yellow Lightspeed Ranger Kelsey.

Damon is played by Reggie Rolle and voiced by Keith Ferguson in the Power Rangers: Super Legends video game. (Note: Damon is the first African-American Green Ranger, followed by Joel Rawlings from Power Rangers Lightspeed Rescue.)

=== Kai Chen ===
Kai Chen is the Blue Galaxy Ranger and the wielder of the Blue Quasar Saber. Straight-laced, sensible and ambitious, he is the classic overachiever. Having been brought up in a strict military family, he always does things by the book and likes everything in its place. His orderly world is turned upside down when he becomes a Power Ranger, and he must learn that sometimes rules are meant to be broken when it comes to saving the universe. He is good friends with Kendrix Morgan.

Throughout the series, Kai's arsenal includes:

- A Quasar Cannon for each Rangers.
- Each Rangers' Transdagger morphs into a personal weapon - for Kai, his Transdagger is the Cosma Claw.
- An Astro Cycle each for Leo, Kai and Damon.
- A Jet Jammer for each Ranger.
- Lights of Orion power-up transformation shared by all the Rangers.

He also pilots the Gorilla Galactabeast/Galactazord.

Kai's strict adherence to the rules initially causes much conflict with Leo, but after an incident in which the Quasar Sabers were stolen, Kai warms up to him considerably. He later becomes the new guardian of the Galaxy Book after the original Guardian perishes trying to recover it from Deviot. After Terra Venture's inhabitants arrive on Mirinoi, Kai returns his Quasar Saber to its stone - he later wields it again when Trakeena was revealed to have survived her previous defeat at the hands of Leo and a third time when he and his teammates joined the veteran Ranger army at the end of Power Rangers: Super Megaforce.

Kai is played by Archie Kao.

=== Maya ===
Maya is a tribesgirl from the planet Mirinoi and the Yellow Galaxy Ranger when she draws her Quasar Saber. She shares many characteristics with Cole Evans, the Red Wild Force Ranger in Power Rangers Wild Force. She lives on Mirinoi before she becomes a Ranger when her tribe is attacked and petrified by Furio. She passes through a portal along with the other Rangers and lives aboard Terra Venture on its journey from Earth into deep space. Proud to be the Yellow Galaxy Ranger, Maya believes that as a team they can defeat her archenemy. Her wild spirit and closeness with nature gives her an ability to understand people and everything around her - this allows her to be able to communicate with the Galactabeasts. During the second half of the season, she develops a mild rivalry with Deviot as she is seen battling him numerous times. Throughout the series, Maya's arsenal includes:

- A Quasar Launcher for each Rangers.
- Each Ranger's Transdagger morphs into a personal weapon - for Maya, her Transdagger is the Delta Daggers.
- A Jet Jammer for each Rangers.
- Lights of Orion power-up transformation shared by all the Rangers.

She also pilots the Wolf Galactabeast/Galactazord.

Maya and her teammates later replaced the Quasar Sabers in their stones, but would draw them forth again in order to battle Trakeena and her Demon allies, and then to join the Megaforce Rangers in their final battle with the Armada.

Maya is played by Cerina Vincent. (Note: Unlike Kendrix and Karone, Maya does not have a skirt with her ranger suit since her Gingaman counterpart is male.)

=== Kendrix Morgan ===
Kendrix Morgan is introduced as a science officer aboard Terra Venture. She is one of the six people to travel through the spatial rift to Mirinoi in the first episode, and her Quasar Saber is that of the Pink Galaxy Ranger. Highly intelligent and analytical by nature, Kendrix has an interest in all things scientific - she always has a logical explanation for everything which sometimes prevents her from seeing the wonder that's around her. Her blossoming friendship with Leo teaches her to be more fun-loving and spontaneous. Throughout the series, Kendrix's arsenal includes:

- A Quasar Cannon for each Ranger.
- Each Ranger's Transdagger morphs into a personal weapon - for Kendrix, her Transdagger is the Beta Bow.
- A Jet Jammer for each Ranger.
- Lights of Orion power-up transformation shared by all the Rangers.

She also pilots the Wildcat GalactabeastGalactazord.

Kendrix dies two-thirds into the series by giving her life to save Terra Venture and Cassie of the Space Power Rangers. When Karone is thrown off a cliff by Trakeena, Kendrix's spirit (in Ranger form) passes on her Transmorpher (and with it her powers) to Karone who promptly retrieves the powers' corresponding Quasar Saber from Trakeena and helps save the rest of the Rangers. When the Quasar Sabers are returned to Mirinoi in the finale, Kendrix is brought back to life by unknown means - she subsequently reclaims the Quasar Saber and joins her teammates in fighting alongside the Lightspeed Rescue Rangers against Trakeena on Earth, but does not appear as a returning Ranger in the finale of Power Rangers Super Megaforce to help the current team finish off the final attack by the Armada as Karone was the Pink Galaxy Ranger.

Kendrix is played by Valerie Vernon.

=== Karone ===
Karone of KO-35 is Andros' sister and was, for the entirety of In Space, the leading villain Astronema after she is captured prior to the series' beginning by some of In Space's villains who would turn her into Astronema. After Kendrix's noble death, Karone is drawn to the frontier planet Onyx where she poses as her villain identity to obtain the lost Pink Quasar Saber; she is exposed by Trakeena, and during a tough unmorphed battle with her, Karone is thrown off a cliff - she is rescued by Kendrix's spirit who grants her the powers of the Pink Ranger. When Karone returned and reclaims the Pink Quasar Saber from Trakeena, she becomes the new Pink Galaxy Ranger. She serves with the other Galaxy Rangers as a means to atone for her past as Astronema and helps save Terra Venture from destruction. Upon returning the Pink Quasar Saber to its stone on Mirinoi, Kendrix was revived. Karone returned as the Pink Galaxy Ranger in Power Rangers Super Megaforce to battle the Warstar Armada on Earth.

Karone made a cameo in the footage in Power Rangers Beast Morphers.

During the events of "Shattered Grid", Kimberly and Jen Scotts arrive on Terra Venture after it has been attacked by Drakkon. Karone is the only Lost Galaxy Ranger who has not been captured by Drakkon. Jen expresses surprise at seeing her as she had been expecting Kendrix. They rescue her and bring her on board the Pterodactyl Zord where she is tended to by Carter Grayson, the Red Lightspeed Rescue Ranger. Later, she is one of the Rangers who battles Drakkon's forces in the battle at Corinth, but her powers are removed when Drakkon's cannons are fired at her and the other rescued Rangers. They escape before capture. Later in the Command Center, Karone is seen with her powers restored watching Andros from the shadows. She talks to Jennifer, who convinces her to approach Andros - she does so and informs Andros that he was successful in saving her.

Karone is portrayed by Melody Perkins.

=== Mike Corbett ===
Mike Corbett is the older brother of Leo. He is an excellent security officer and very protective of his younger brother. Mike is one of the security personnel assigned to Terra Venture. During a training exercise, he encounters Maya, who emerges through a spatial rift from Mirinoi. Accompanying her, he and the others pull the Quasar Sabers from their stones. Furio, who is attempting to take the sabers, becomes enraged and begins turning the planet into stone. As they attempt to escape, Mike falls into an abyss that Furio created. Mike is able to pass his saber to Leo before he falls. Inside the abyss, he encounters the Magna Defender's spirit who merges with him.

Mike's spirit influences the Magna Defender by causing him pain when he does something that was morally wrong. The Magna Defender later frees Mike by sacrificing himself. Leo wants to return the Quasar Saber to him since he pulled it out and was chosen to become the Red Ranger but Mike tells him that he is the Red Ranger and maybe he was destined to pull the saber out and give it to Leo. The Magna Defender's spirit later gives Mike a morpher that allows him to become the new Magna Defender, telling him that it was his own destiny. Mike becomes a loyal ally to the Rangers. At the series' conclusion, Terra Venture attempts to escape the Lost Galaxy by entering through an open portal which is closing and Terra Venture is not fast enough - Mike sacrifices his powers and Zord (and almost himself in the process) to keep the portal open long enough to let the station through. Mike is the 1st one of the team to reveal his powers to the ordinary citizens (the other Rangers reveal themselves in episode 45: Part 3 of "Journey's End"). He later appeared as part of the Ranger army at the end of Super Megaforce.

Mike is played by Russell Lawrence.

== Allies ==
=== D.E.C.A. ===
D.E.C.A. is the A.I. computer aboard the Astro Megaship. Having aided the Space Rangers previously, she also provided occasional assistance to the Galaxy Rangers during their missions. She was destroyed along with her ship at the end of the series when the Astro Megaship was set to self-destruct.

D.E.C.A. is voiced by Julie Maddalena. D.E.C.A. is also in Power Rangers: In Space aboard the Astro Megaship as the A.I. (first appearance)

=== Commander Stanton ===
Commander Stanton is the commander of Terra Venture. He oversees all operations on Terra Venture and leads its special forces which are trained with the inevitable clash of the unknown. When Terra Venture was attacked by Trakeena following the ordeal in the Lost Galaxy, he had successfully evacuated Terra Venture. Alongside the rest of the inhabitants of Terra Venture, he is currently living on Mirinoi.

Commander Stanton is played by Tom Whyte.

=== Magna Defender ===
The Magna Defender is an ancient warrior who 3,000 years in the past swore revenge on Scorpius after his son Zika was murdered in an attack of his forces. However, before he could do so, he was sealed in a pit on Mirinoi by his nemesis Treacheron. Years later, he returned to seek revenge. The Rangers don't know who he is or what he wants. The Magna Defender fought Samuron and won. He confronted his son's captor Fishface, and defeated him. When Destruxo had the Lights of Orion, the Magna Defender charged him on a cliff. Destruxo grabbed the Magna Defender's sword and spun him. Impostra who was disguised as Treacheron joined the fight and hit the Magna Defender's cape then he tripped on his cape and fell into the water. While in the woods the Magna Defender shoots Impostra and walks into the scene with his shiny cape behind him. The Lights of Orion hover in woods. The Magna Defender fails to get the lights and trips over his cape as the lights explode into the Power Rangers. He tried to blow up the mountain dome and Torozord throws him out. As he says, "Torozord, come back here, betrayed by my own Zord?" BOOM! The Freaky Tiki appears behind him thrusting his spear through his cape and into his back. A scene shows the spear pierced through his cape and the Rangers helped him. He told the Red Ranger about his brother and said, "He weighs heavily on my heart when I feel hatred taking control." Zika tells his father not to kill people for revenge and the Magna Defender kills himself.

The spirits of the Magna Defender and Zika later appeared to Mike when the Rangers were in peril, giving him the Magna Blade. Much like with the Quasar Sabers, a two-part morpher also appeared on Mike's arms, allowing him to become the new Magna Defender. Later, Mike sacrificed the Torozord and his powers to free Terra Venture from the Lost Galaxy. Then the original Magna Defender's spirit appeared to Mike again, this time to congratulate him on how heroically he had used the powers and tell him that he had fulfilled the Magna Defender's destiny. Prior to Mike's sacrifice of the powers, Magna Defender's spirit appeared to him and motivated him to perform the action. His powers were apparently reclaimed at a later date and used in the final battle with the Warstar Armada in Power Rangers Megaforce.

The Magna Defender arrives when summoned from his universe during the events of "Shattered Grid", being the only other member of the Lost Galaxy Rangers to escape capture aside from Karone, the second Pink Lost Galaxy Ranger. It has been revealed that the Magna Defender will join a team of rangers formed across the various universes in the follow-up to "Shattered Grid" in "Beyond the Grid," alongside the Ranger Slayer, Andros, Cameron, Tanya, and the as of yet unrevealed Dark Ranger.

Magna Defender is voiced by Kerrigan Mahan.

=== High Councillor Renier ===
High Councillor Renier is the kind and wise leader of the High Council of Terra Venture that is in charge of making the big decisions on Terra Venture's journeys. She is very supportive and serves as a motherly figure to the crew members of Terra Venture. With Terra Venture successfully evacuated, High Councilor Renier is currently living on Mirinoi with the rest of the inhabitants of Terra Venture.

Councillor Renier is played by Betty Hankins.

=== Councillor Brody ===
Councillor Brody is a member of the High Council of Terra Venture.

He is played by Jack Betts.

=== Zika ===
Zika is the Magna Defender's son who, in a flashback, was killed by Scorpius 3,000 years ago. His death has been the sole reason for the Magna Defender's revenge against Scorpius. He later reappeared to his father as a ghost to encourage him to become the warrior of good he used to be and in addition convince him to abandon his need for vengeance to save Terra Venture from a volcano eruption he caused. After the Magna Defender sacrifices himself, he is reunited with him and he tells him how proud he is of him.

Zika is voiced by Ryan James.

=== Farkus "Bulk" Bulkmeier ===
Farkus "Bulk" Bulkmeier was with Professor Phenomenus when they become inhabitants of Terra Venture, but they have accidentally left Skull behind. He and Professor Phenomenus managed to take up a job at the Comet Cafe. When Trakeena did her final attack on Terra Venture, Bulk and Professor Phenomenus successfully evacuated Terra Venture. Bulk subsequently returned to Earth and was seen in the Power Rangers Wild Force episode "Forever Red" and Power Rangers: Samurai.

=== Professor Phenomenus ===
Professor Phenomenus and Bulk have become inhabitants of Terra Venture, but they have accidentally left Skull behind. Professor Phenomenus and Bulk managed to take up a job at the Comet Cafe. When Trakeena did her final attack on Terra Venture, Professor Phenomenus and Bulk successfully evacuated Terra Venture.

Professor Phenomenus is played by Jack Banning.

== Scorpius' army ==
=== Scorpius ===
Scorpius is an alien insectoid warlord and ruler of the Sting-Wingers. He resembled a large arachnid with tentacles instead of legs. He was an enemy of the Magna Defender, having attacked his planet 3,000 years ago and killed his only son, Zika. Scorpius frequently attempted to gather powerful objects to himself, including the Quasar Sabers and the Lights of Orion. The result of these mad quests often left the objects in question in the hands of the Galaxy Power Rangers, and severely depleted Scorpius' army as they were either punished or destroyed by the Rangers. Scorpius had a daughter, Trakeena, upon whom he doted. He refused to allow her to be involved in his evil deeds, and he would not allow her to engage the Rangers in battle despite her requests. Trakeena was the only person he had a soft spot for, even once sparing Furio's life upon Trakeena's request. Eventually, Scorpius webbed a cocoon for Trakeena. He told her that it was her time to enter the cocoon, to shed her mortal beauty and become an insect with magnificent powers, like him. Trakeena declined, and when Scorpius tried to force her, she ran away and teleported out into space. Scorpius later met Deviot and appointed him as his new general. Deviot plotted against Scorpius to depose him and enter the cocoon so that he could gain great powers. Deviot tricked Scorpius into attacking the Galaxy Power Rangers, saying that Trakeena was their prisoner. Though Scorpius was mortally wounded by Leo, Trakeena returned to take his throne before Scorpius could pass it to Deviot. Before he died, Scorpius told Deviot to be as loyal to Trakeena as he had been to him.

Scorpius is voiced by Kim Strauss.

=== Trakeena ===
Trakeena is the main antagonist in Power Rangers Lost Galaxy, the insectoid daughter of Scorpius, the evil princess of his alien army. Trakeena was born with both mortal beauty and insect features as well. She carries a staff with a cockroach emblem on the side of it, but lost this one in the desert on Onyx. However, after her father's death, she gained another staff with an amber-encased spider within the staff that could also be transformed into a sword to be used for hand-to-hand combat. She can use her insect armor to protect her from harm, but was never shown to have used it in any of the episodes after her father's death. Trakeena was incredibly vain and proud. On one occasion, she had the monster Crumummy steal the beauty from all the female inhabitants of Terra Venture, because she hated the thought that they might be more beautiful than her. This plan was foiled, however, and the beauty was restored to the inhabitants of the station. She also liked to accompany her father's generals on their missions, though her father disapproved of it. In one such case, Treacheron claimed that Trakeena had followed him to battle, whereas in truth, he had allowed it. This upset Trakeena, and in retaliation, she convinced her father Scorpius that Treacheron was a traitor, for which he was locked up. This feud continued, and Treacheron tricked Trakeena into searching for a silver goblet, just so that he could ambush her once he was free from his cell. She was saved only thanks to the intervention of the Galaxy Power Rangers.

Eventually, Trakeena learned that her father Scorpius wished for her to enter the cocoon, to become an insect with great powers, like him. She refused, mainly not wanting to lose her mortal beauty the transformation would cause, and fled to the planet Onyx when he tried to force her, where she met Villamax. Villamax offered to train her to be a great warrior, and taught her swordplay and martial arts. She returned to the Scorpion Stinger after hearing of Scorpius' defeat at the hands of the Rangers. While Scorpius was dying, Trakeena was given his throne and all of his powers. Deviot told her that Scorpius was destroyed by the Red Galaxy Ranger. Though she captured the Red Galaxy Ranger, he escaped. Terra Venture entered the Lost Galaxy where Trakeena was unwilling to follow. When it emerged once again, Trakeena destroyed the ship of Captain Mutiny, who was pursuing it. Trakeena had a personal grudge with Karone who she believed betrayed the United Alliance of Evil and exposing her in Onyx. Trakeena nearly defeated her by pushing her off the cliff until Kendrix's spirit rescued Karone and she became the new Pink Galaxy Ranger.

Though Trakeena had put her father's cocoon into storage, Deviot still wanted to enter it to gain power. He dragged her into the cocoon, where they merged into a single being. Deviot's power and ruthlessness had been incorporated into her personality, driving her insane. She had the Scorpion Stinger unleash a vicious attack on Terra Venture, destroying their last engine and causing it to crash on a moon nearby Mirinoi. While the colony was forced to evacuate the damaged ship, she launched a full-scale assault, arming all her Sting Wingers with bombs to destroy the colony. Her general Villamax believed that this tactic of mass suicide bombing was foolish as Trakeena was destroying her own army. Using this tactic, Trakeena succeeded in destroying the Stratoforce and Centaurus Megazords, though in the process lost her whole army. After the colony escaped and fled to Mirinoi, she pursued them in the Scorpion Stinger, planning to blast the escape ships. When Villamax refused to obey this order, she destroyed him. When she attempted to attack again, the Power Rangers intervened in the Astro Megaship. In an attempt to stop her, the Rangers self-destructed the Astro Megaship, causing the Scorpion Stinger to crash back on the moon. However, Trakeena survived and as a last resort, entered the cocoon again. She emerged, mutated into a green, muscular humanoid insect, just as her father had intended. She then powered up Terra Venture's remains to destroy the colony on Mirinoi. Her full plan was to crash the damaged Terra Venture into Mirinoi, obliterating the colony and the planet as well as destroying the Power Rangers in the crash. She engaged the Rangers in battle and was seemingly destroyed by the Red Galaxy Ranger's Battlizer when he pulled her in close and shot her point-blank. The crash of Terra Venture was diverted from the colony by the timely intervention of the Galaxy Megazord, under control of the Galactabeasts only, in this instance.

However, in Power Rangers Lightspeed Rescue, it was revealed that she had survived and managed to return to her humanoid form, though was now horribly disfigured. She then made her way to Earth, planning to obtain her revenge on the Rangers by destroying their home world. She acquired the allegiance of the Demon Triskull and his army of ghouls, collecting energy to return to her insectoid form. To do that, she captured humans to drain their life force. The Galaxy Rangers teamed up with the Lightspeed Power Rangers in an attempt to stop her. Queen Bansheera finds out about Trakeena's plan and she warns Olympius that if she returns to her insectoid form again, Trakeena would be able to destroy Olympius easily. However, Olympius sabotaged Trakeena's power drain with a poisoned dagger and mutated her into a gigantic monster. Despite the help of the Galactabeasts, the Galaxy and Lightspeed Rangers were unable to stop her until the Omega Megazord became infused with the Lights of Orion. Powered by the Lights of Orion, the Omega Megazord destroyed Trakeena once and for all with a combined strike from its own weapon and the Galaxy Sword.

Trakeena made a cameo in the footage in Power Rangers Beast Morphers in Making Bad.

Trakeena is played by Amy Miller in Lost Galaxy and Jennifer Burns in Lightspeed Rescue. In the video game Power Rangers: Super Legends, she is voiced by Kim Mai Guest.

=== Furio ===
Furio (whose name is likely inspired by the term 'furious'.) is Scorpius' cybernetic general who led the brutal attack on the planet Mirinoi, seeking to gain the powers of the Quasar Sabers. Not amongst those chosen, however, Furio couldn't pull the sabers from the stone, just like numerous warriors before him. He was confronted by six warriors (Mike, Leo, Maya, Kendrix, Damon and Kai) who battled his army of Stingwingers to protect the people. It was in this awesome battle, five of the six warriors then pulled the legendary Quasar Sabers from the rock. Enraged, Furio sought to destroy everyone in Mirinoi by turning Maya's people and every other living thing to stone. He pursued the warriors and managed to create a crevice in the jungle-like planet, which tragically sealed Mike inside. Furio witnessed the warriors transform into Power Rangers and was no match against their energy. He left the planet and reported to his superior that he was going to retrieve the sabers for him. His next encounter with the rangers would take place on Terra Venture, where he attacked Leo but left abruptly. With Scorpius growing impatient with him, Furio assigned several monsters to snatch the sabers. When Horn succeeded, Furio ordered him to destroy the weapons, having been commanded by Scorpius to do so. He then allied with Scorpius’ daughter, the adventure-starved Trakeena, and sought to gain the Lights of Orion, yet another ancient source of power. In a devious plot to use Leo for the Lights, Furio and Trakeena managed to trick Leo into believing that his brother had returned. When this plan failed, Scorpius almost destroyed him having grown tired of his constant failures when he's banished. Desperate to prove his worth, he finally stumbles on what he believes are the Lights of Orion. Before he can retrieve it, however, he's interrupted by Leo. The two engage in battle and Furio at his last straw, commits suicide by exploding himself and Leo, in a fruitless attempt to destroy his enemy because Leo is saved by Magna Defender. He was one of the most loyal and sinister generals of Scorpius, having turned all the inhabitants of Mirinoi into stone. As the first major threat to Terra Venture, Furio often proved to be Leo's equal in sword fight; thus, his ruthlessness was instrumental in the maturity of the Red Galaxy Ranger.

Furio is voiced by Tom Wyner. (Note: Furio is a partially-recolored version of Denji Sentai Megaranger villain Dr. Hinelar's monster form.)

=== Treacheron ===
Treacheron, a loyal servant whose name, ironically, is based on the term "treachery", and the second general of Scorpius' army. He is a manta ray-themed samurai in a white and blue-outfit, manta ray wings behind him, a samurai sword, and a blue face with a black-and-white version of his horizon emblem on his head. Treacheron was known as the arch-rival of the Magna Defender. 3,000 years ago, he had beaten the Magna Defender and imprisoned him within the planet Mirinoi for centuries. After Furio's destruction, Treacheron was appointed the general position. At Scorpius' request, he was sent to find the Lights of Orion. On one occasion, Treacheron was seduced by Trakeena into taking her to Terra Venture to find the Lights and battle the Rangers. He complied, despite knowing that Scorpius would be angry about it. When he was forced to explain himself, he lied that Trakeena had followed him without his permission. When the Lights had finally been found, Scorpius sent Treacheron and Destruxo to retrieve them. Impostra, disguised as Treacheron, tricked Destruxo into absorbing the power of the Lights, and Scorpius, believing that Treacheron had betrayed him, confined Treacheron to a cell. Treacheron swore to make whoever had done this to him pay dearly. The Shark Brothers informed him that it was Trakeena that had set him up. Treacheron arranged some payback. He told Trakeena about the location of the Silver Goblet, then escaped and set up an ambush for her. He would have slain her, but the Rangers interrupted. Treacheron engaged in battle Leo Corbett who managed to shatter Treacheron's katana and strike him down with his Quasar Saber and Power-Up Claw. Treacheron barely survived the strike and refused to relent in his attack, going after Leo with his broken weapon. With no other choice, Leo dealt Treacheron a single blow from his Quasar Saber. In his weakened state, Treacheron was destroyed by the hit. Treacheron was resurrected by Hexuba in the Lost Galaxy, but was destroyed again by Mike Corbett.

Treacheron is voiced by Derek Stephen Prince.

=== Deviot ===
Deviot (whose name was based on the term 'devious') is a psychopathic and treacherous pierrot-themed cyborg who sought the power of Scorpius' cocoon. Soon after his appearance, he developed a strong hatred toward Maya, the Yellow Galaxy Ranger, and would often attack her first during battle. Deviot appeared on the scene with three Zords that he attacked the Galaxy Rangers and Galactabeasts with in battle. However, these Zords turned to good, having once been Galactabeasts. After continuous failures, Deviot stole the legendary Galaxy Book, and used its power to mutate. He was defeated, but survived, returned in his old form and joined forces with Captain Mutiny. After escaping the Lost Galaxy, and surviving to the destruction of Mutiny's Castle by unknown way, Deviot was attacked by Trakeena, and both fell into the cocoon. The being that emerged was an amalgam of both Deviot and Trakeena. Trakeena possessed one of his blasters on her right arm, and had a metallic echo to her voice as well. His physical traits were purged after her transformation into an insect, although his influence remained. Whatever remained of Deviot was destroyed when Trakeena was finally destroyed by the Lights of Orion powered Omega Megazord in Power Rangers: Lightspeed Rescue. Deviot shared many characteristics with the Power Rangers in Space villain, Darkonda as both were treacherous and deceptive and clashed with a fellow villain possessing more honorable qualities.

Deviot is voiced by Bob Papenbrook.

=== Villamax ===
Villamax is a leather-clad biker warrior who is first seen on the planet Onyx with his sidekick Kegler. He aids Trakeena when she is attacked by unscrupulous patrons of the Onyx bar, and agrees to train her as a warrior. When Scorpius is mortally wounded by the Rangers, Villamax returns to the Scorpion Stinger with Trakeena and serves as one of her generals. Villamax's honorable qualities often clash with the ruthless evil of Deviot (one notable instance is when he let the other Rangers and the Magna Defender go after Leo agreed to give himself up to Trakeena, which he promised to do beforehand). Villamax is particularly horrified when Trakeena and Deviot merge and Trakeena becomes a merciless maniac. When Villamax saves a young girl during Trakeena's assault on Terra Venture and she gives him a flower, Villamax wants nothing more than for Trakeena to stop her chaos. When Villamax attempts to reason with Trakeena, she kills him and crushes the flower. Villamax's final words to Trakeena were, "You've learned nothing."

Villamax made a cameo in the archive footage in Power Rangers Beast Morphers episode "Making Bad".

Villamax is voiced by David Lodge.

=== Kegler ===
Kegler is a stout-little scholar-themed alien and the longtime companion of Villamax. Though he lacks battle skills, he makes up for it with his extensive knowledge of technology. His name presumably comes from the fact that part of his armor is a keg barrel. Kegler and Villamax met Trakeena on Onyx and decided to join her army on the Scorpion Stinger after the death of her father, Scorpius. Kegler became suspicious of Deviot when he disrespected Villamax's code of honor. It is possible that it was Kegler that learned of Deviot's treachery and informed Villamax and Trakeena while Deviot was in the Lost Galaxy. After Trakeena and Deviot merged into one being, Kegler witnessed the death of Villamax at Trakeena's hands and was last seen onboard the Scorpion Stinger before it crashed on Mirinoi's moon.

Kegler is voiced by Richard Cansino.

=== Stingwingers ===
The Stingwingers are Scorpius and Trakeena's insectoid foot soldiers that have a sickle arm and can fly. The entire army was eventually destroyed when Trakeena possessed by Deviot had bombs attached to them in a kamikaze-related plot to destroy the Centaurus Megazord and the Stratoforce Megazord.

=== Scorpius' Monsters ===
These are the monsters used by Scorpius and his henchmen. In earlier episodes, a monster would drink a special liquid to make them grow. In later episodes, the monsters grew on their own.

- Brunt (voiced by Kirk Thornton) - A blue and white robotic warrior who captured the Galactabeasts so that he can become one of Scorpius' generals. He fled after his failure. (Note: Brunt is a recolored hybrid of two Beetleborgs monsters. He has the head of Green Cannon Machine and the de-spiked body of Rocket Man.)
- Radster (voiced by Bob Papenbrook) - A scorpion/biker monster who accompanied Scorpius in the attack on the Magna Defender's planet 3,000 years ago. Radster was later used by Furio to attack Terra Venture. This monster was destroyed by the Lion Galactabeast.
- Horn (voiced by Blake Torney) - A waterbug/biker monster and weapons collector hired by Furio. This monster was destroyed by the Lion Galactabeast. Horn was revived by Hexuba to fight the Rangers only to get destroyed again.
- Gasser (voiced by Dave Mallow in the first appearance, Blake Torney in the second appearance) - A stag beetle/biker monster used by Furio to attack Terra Venture. This monster was destroyed by the Galaxy Megazord.
- Mutantrum (voiced by Robert Axelrod in the first appearance, Neil Kaplan in the second appearance) - A shape shifting sea urchin/ninja bandit monster used by Furio to trick Leo into opening Orion Cavern. This monster was destroyed by the Galaxy Megazord. Mutantrum was revived by Hexuba to fight the Rangers only to get destroyed again.
- Wisewizard (voiced by Ezra Weisz) - A squid/Kannushi monster used by Furio to seek out the Lights of Orion. This monster was destroyed by the Galaxy Megazord.
- Quakemaker (voiced by Michael Sorich) - A hornet/biker monster used by Furio to seek out the Lights of Orion. He can generate earthquakes. This monster was destroyed by the Galaxy Megazord. Quakemaker was revived by Hexuba to fight the Rangers only to get destroyed again.
- Starcog - An unseen starfish-themed engineer monster used by Treacheron to seek out the Lights of Orion. All that was seen of Starcog was its shadow. Once Leo chased it outside, he was not seen.
- Ruptor (voiced by Brianne Siddall) - A pill bug/biker monster used by Treacheron to seek out the Lights of Orion. This monster was destroyed by the Galaxy Megazord.
- Samuron (voiced by Kirk Thornton) - A sledgehammer-wielding coral/Sōhei monster used by Treacheron to seek out the Lights of Orion. This monster was destroyed by the Magna Defender.
- Fishface (voiced by Richard Epcar in the first appearance, Derek Stephen Prince in the second appearance) - A scorpionfish/bandit monster used by Treacheron to seek out the Lights of Orion. This monster was destroyed by the Defender Torozord. Fisface was revived by Hexuba to fight the Power Rangers only to get destroyed again.
- Sledge - A blue and brown rhinoceros beetle/biker monster that had accompanied Scorpius in the attack on the Magna Defender's planet 3,000 years ago.
- Chillyfish (voiced by Tony Robinson) - A jellyfish/swordsman monster. It had the ability to make the entire colony of Terra Venture fall asleep with this ability not working on animals. This monster was destroyed by the Defender Torozord.
- Destruxo (voiced by Neil Kaplan) - A powerful lobster/samurai monster used by Treacheron to unleash the Lights of Orion. This monster was destroyed by the Orion Galaxy Rangers. Destruxo was revived by Hexuba to fight the Rangers only to get destroyed again.
- Impostra (voiced by Nancy Van Iderstine) - A shapeshifting Gorgon-like monster that accompanied Scopius in the attack on the Magna Defender's planet 3,000 years ago. She was later used by Trakeena to double-cross Treacheron. Impostra tries to use the snake bracelet to siphon the Lights from Destruxo, in order to bring them to Trakeena, but she is wounded by Magna Defender and is forced to flee the battle.
- Shark Brothers (voiced by Patrick Thomas and Tom Fahn) - A red ninja-themed hammerhead shark and a green ninja-themed shark with horns who aided Treacheron against Trakeena. They were destroyed by the Orion Galaxy Megazord.
- Freaky Tiki (voiced by Blake Torney) - A tribal tiki-masked witch doctor monster used by Trakeena to attack Terra Venture. It was used to destroy the Magna Defender. As the Magna Defender's Zord betrayed him, Freaky Tiki appeared behind him cause an explosion on his heart and stabbed him in the back with his spear. This monster was destroyed by the Orion Galaxy Megazord. Freaky Tiki was revived by Hexuba to fight the Rangers only to get destroyed again.
- Skelekron (voiced by Doug Stone) - A knight-armored Gashadokuro monster used by Scorpius to steal the Rangers' powers. He used the stolen powers to create his Skelekron Warriors. This monster was destroyed by the Defender Torozord.
  - Skelekron Warriors - Miniature Grim Reaper-like dolls that were given life to their master Skelekron with the help of a shrine and Skelekron's Mirror Shield. They have scarves that come in yellow, green, blue, and white. The Skelekron Warriors were defeated by the Galaxy Rangers. (Note: The Yellow Skelekron Warrior and the Blue Skelekron Warrior were exclusive to the US.)
- Crumummy (voiced by William Butler) - A mummy monster used by Trakeena to steal the beauty of Terra Venture. This monster was destroyed by the Defender Torozord and the Orion Galaxy Megazord.
- Hardtochoke (voiced by Ken Merckx in the first appearance, Michael Sorich in the second appearance) - A bulky-scaled Bigfoot monster used by Deviot to control the Centaurus Megazord and the Stratoforce Megazord. After getting thrashed by the Centaurus and Stratoforce Megazords and Zenith Carrierzord, This monster is destroyed by the Orion Galaxy Megazord. Hardtochoke was revived by Hexuba to fight the Rangers only to get destroyed again.
- Kubak (voiced by Stephen Apostolina) - A Kabuki-themed crab monster used by Deviot in an attempt to assassinate Trakeena. This monster was destroyed by the Galaxy Megazord.
- Teksa (voiced by Kim Strauss in the first appearance, Michael Sorich in the second appearance) - An octopus/Komusō monster used by Deviot in an attempt to assassinate Trakeena. This monster was destroyed by Trakeena. Teksa was revived by Hexuba to fight the Rangers only to get destroyed again.
- Rykon (voiced by Carol Hoyt) - A shape-shifting pharaoh monster used by Trakeena to steal the Galaxy Book. This monster was destroyed by the Stratoforce and Orion Galaxy Megazords.
- Cannonbrawl (voiced by Tom Wyner) - A robotic cannonball monster used by Trakeena to kidnap High Councilor Renier. This monster was destroyed by the Stratoforce and Orion Galaxy Megazords.
- Icy Angel (voiced by Barbara Goodson) - A fallen angel monster used by Trakeena to take control of Commander Stanton. Her bow and arrows can affect the personality of anyone that is struck by it. This monster was destroyed by Defender Torozord and the Orion Galaxy Megazord.
- Motor Mantis (voiced by Derek Stephen Prince in the first appearance, Michael McConnohie in the second appearance) - A motorcycle-riding praying mantis/biker monster that accompanied Scorpius in the attack on the Magna Defender's home planet 3,000 years ago. Motor Mantis was later used by Deviot to attack Terra Venture. This monster was destroyed by the Galaxy Megazord.
- Loyax (voiced by Simon Prescott) - A noble robotic wrecking ball-themed warrior that came under the control of Trakeena's forces. He was destroyed by Deviot.
- Maronda (voiced by Brianne Siddall) - A motorcycle-riding Lamiai monster used by Trakeena to attack Terra Venture. This monster was destroyed by Centaurus and Orion Galaxy Megazords.
- Chameliac (voiced by Tom Fahn) - A copier/knight-themed robotic knight monster used to guard the laser dish that can destroy the Galactabeasts. He could duplicate the Rangers' weapons and attacks. This monster was destroyed by the Stratoforce and Orion Galaxy Megazords.
- Centipede Monster - An unnamed centipede/biker monster seen during a missing battle on Trakeena's archives.
- Spikaka (voiced by Brett Walkow) - A mole cricket/biker monster used by Deviot to ambush the Rangers. This monster was destroyed by the Orion Galaxy Rangers.
- Ironite (voiced by Eddie Frierson) - A robotic tank monster used by Deviot to attack Terra Venture. This monster was destroyed by the Centaurus and Orion Galaxy Megazords.
- Magnetox (voiced by Dave Mallow) - A robotic power-draining magnet monster used by Villamax to attack Terra Venture. This monster was destroyed by the Red Armored Ranger.
- Decibat (voiced by Kim Strauss) - A sonic cicada/vampire/biker monster used by Deviot to attack Terra Venture. This monster was destroyed by the Orion Galaxy Rangers.

== Psycho Rangers ==
The Psycho Rangers, the evil counterparts of the Space Rangers, are brought back by the villains of this series in episode 30 to assist them in a scheme to deal with the good Rangers. The Psycho Rangers are destroyed by the combined powers of the Space and Galaxy Rangers, save for Psycho Pink who is destroyed in episode 31.

- Psycho Red (voiced by Patrick David).
- Psycho Black (voiced by Michael Maize).
- Psycho Blue (voiced by Wally Wingert).
- Psycho Yellow (voiced by Kamera Walton).
- Psycho Pink (voiced by Vicki Davis).

== Captain Mutiny's space pirates ==
This was a group of space pirates from the Lost Galaxy that enslaved the passengers of any spacecraft that passed through the region and forced them to mine valuable gems on their home world. Here is the army of Captain Mutiny:

=== Captain Mutiny ===
Captain Mutiny, who appeared in the final third of the Power Rangers Lost Galaxy, is a pirate captain in pirate ship-themed armor and a hook for a left hand who was the leader of a villainous crew of space pirates in the so-called "Lost Galaxy" that the crew of Terra Venture encountered when they were magically transported there. At first, he pretended to be sympathetic to their plight and even offered to help them get back home. However, it soon became apparent that he was anything but philanthropic in his intentions. Rather, he intended to loot the space station and enslave its population. His plan was foiled by the Galaxy Power Rangers. When Deviot joined Captain Mutiny's crew, Mutiny was a bit reluctant fearing that if Trakeena found out, she would "toss him overboard". This goes to show that not only does Mutiny know of Trakeena, but is afraid of her as well. This fear would turn out to be justified: when he pursued them into the normal galaxy, Trakeena destroyed his castle taking him down with it.

Captain Mutiny is voiced by Mike Reynolds.

=== Barbarax ===
Barbarax is a robotic Viking who serves as the strongman on the small crew of the evil Captain Mutiny. He wields a powerful battle ax that can send energy charges through the ground. He is destroyed by Trakeena when she crushes Mutiny's palace.

Barbarax is voiced by Richard Epcar.

=== Hexuba ===
Hexuba was an Egyptian-themed sorceress who served Captain Mutiny. She was responsible for resurrecting several monsters that the Galaxy Power Rangers had already defeated as well as Treacheron. After the Rangers defeated the revived monsters, Hexuba merged with those monster spirits and challenged the Rangers herself. She was destroyed by the Orion Galaxy Megazord, Defender Torozord, Stratoforce Megazord, and Centaurus Megazord. Hexuba's powered-up form has the heads and faces of different monsters on her. She has the head of Hardtochoke on her left shoulder, the head of the Asura monster (unused in this series), the faces of Icy Angel, Skelekron, and Crumummy on her left arm, the faces of Freaky Tiki and Maronda on her right arm, and the face of Rykon on her stomach.

Hexuba is voiced by Rajia Baroudi.

=== Titanisaur ===
Titanisaur is a colossal dinosaur-like monster that serves Captain Mutiny. It was naturally giant, the same size as a Megazord or any other giant monster. It carries Mutiny's castle on its back, can be directly controlled through a steering wheel in the castle, and has the capability to "swim" through space. It is also very strong, tearing the arms off several megazords. Its one weakness is that while Mutiny's castle is attached to it, Titanisaur gets overheated and must be cooled down by submerging in water. To better even Titanisaur's odds against the Rangers, Mutiny disengaged his castle from it and allowed the monster to fight the Rangers on its own. During a final battle, Defender Torozord turned the tide of battle against Titanisaur by chopping off his tail with the Defender Axe. With Titanisaur more vulnerable, he was weakened by powered strikes from the Defender Torozord and Stratoforce and Centaurus Megazords. Once he was weakened, the Orion Galaxy Megazord destroyed it with a powered strike from its saber.

=== Swabbies ===
The Swabbies are Captain Mutiny's foot soldiers. They appear as orange pirates wearing shorts, bandannas, and belts diagonally across their upper body. Swabbies carry cutlasses as their weapons. They are all destroyed when Trakeena destroys Mutiny's castle.

=== Captain Mutiny's Monsters ===
These are the monsters used by Captain Mutiny and his henchmen.

- Rocketron (voiced by Glen McDougal) - A robotic missile monster used by Barbarax to attack the Galaxy Rangers. It was defeated by the Stratoforce and Galaxy Megazords, and then destroyed upon self-destructing after Deviot drained his powers in order to return to normal.
- Grunchor - A hideous monster used by Captain Mutiny to attack Terra Venture. It was destroyed by the Stratoforce, Centaurus and Orion Galaxy Megazords using Leo Corbett's Galactic Fire Power.
- Rojomon (voiced by Randy Swerdlick) - A fire-breathing prehistoric swordfish/Tyrrhenian mole/prehistoric chameleon-like monster who accompanied Captain Mutiny to the planned execution of Leo and Damon. It was destroyed by the Red Armored Ranger. (Note: Rojomon was originally B-Fighter Kabuto monster Darkness Combined Beast Tokasuzura (unused in Beetleborgs Metallix).)
- Nightmare Monster (voiced by Walter Emanuel Jones) - A robotic masakari-themed monster used by Hexuba in the nightmare world. It was destroyed by Centaurus and Orion Galaxy Megazords.
