= Power Rangers Time Force =

Television series

- Genre: Action-adventure; Science fiction; Superhero; Drama
- Created by: Haim Saban; Toei Company
- Based on: Mirai Sentai Timeranger by Toei Company
- Developed by: Saban Entertainment; Toei Company
- Showrunner: Judd Lynn
- Directed by: Koichi Sakamoto; Kaizo Hayashi; Worth Keeter; Judd Lynn; Isaac Florentine; Yoshi Hosoya; Makoto Yokohama; Jonathan Tzachor
- Starring: Jason Faunt; Michael Copon; Kevin Kleinberg; Deborah Estelle Philips; Erin Cahill; Daniel Southworth; Vernon Wells; Kate Sheldon; Edward Laurence Albert
- Theme music composer: Jeremy Sweet; Jasan Radford
- Composers: Lior Rosner; Jeremy Sweet; Inon Zur; Glenn Scott Lacey; Shuki Levy; Kussa Mahchi
- Countries of origin: United States; Japan
- Original language: English
- No. of episodes: 40

Production
- Executive producers: Haim Saban; Shuki Levy
- Producer: Jonathan Tzachor
- Production locations: California (Greater Los Angeles Area) (Santa Clarita & Los Angeles); Japan (Greater Tokyo Area) (Tokyo, Saitama, Yokohama and Kyoto)
- Cinematography: Ilan Rosenberg; Sean McLin (2nd unit)
- Running time: 20 minutes
- Production companies: Saban Entertainment; Renaissance Atlantic Entertainment; Toei Company, Ltd.; MMPR Productions, Inc.

Original release
- Network: Fox (Fox Kids)
- Release: February 3 – November 17, 2001

Related
- Power Rangers television series

Power Rangers Time Force is a television series and the ninth entry of the Power Rangers franchise, based on the 24th Super Sentai series Mirai Sentai Timeranger, running for 40 half-hour episodes from February to November 2001.

Originally, a Time Force film was planned, but ultimately went unproduced in light of the commercial failure of Turbo: A Power Rangers Movie and the purchase of the franchise by Disney. However, Buena Vista Home Entertainment did release the series' final four episodes as a film-length home video in 2002 entitled The End of Time. A video game based on the series was released in November 2001 for PlayStation, Game Boy Color, and Game Boy Advance.

== Plot ==
When a gang of mutant criminals led by the powerful Ransik escapes from 3000 to 2001, a group of officers from the Time Force law enforcement agency -- Jen Scotts, Lucas Kendall, Trip Regis, and Katie Walker -- pursue them through time. To assist them, they recruit a socialite named Wes Collins to help them unlock their powers and become Power Rangers to stop Ransik's gang. Along the way, Wes' father Mr. Collins forms the Silver Guardians private security team to fight back against the mutants, leading to Silver Guardian and Wes' estranged classmate Eric Meyers obtaining Time Force technology and becoming the Quantum Ranger.

== Cast and characters ==
Time Force Rangers

- Jason Faunt as Wesley "Wes" Collins, the present-day Red Time Force Ranger
  - Jason Faunt also portrays Alexander "Alex" Drake, future Red Time Force Ranger
- Michael Copon as Lucas Kendall, the Blue Time Force Ranger
- Kevin Kleinberg as Trip Regis, the Green Time Force Ranger
- Deborah Estelle Philips as Katie Walker, the Yellow Time Force Ranger
- Erin Cahill as Jennifer "Jen" Scotts, the Pink Time Force Ranger and leader of the team.
- Daniel Southworth as Eric Myers, the Quantum Ranger

Supporting characters

- Edward Laurence Albert as Mr. Collins
- Brianne Siddall as the voice of Circuit
- Douglas Fisher as Phillips
- Roy Werner as Captain Logan
- Ken Merckx as Dr. Michael Zaskin, a scientist at Bio-Lab

Villains

- Vernon Wells as Ransik
- Kate Sheldon as Nadira
- Eddie Frierson as the voice of Frax
- Neil Kaplan as the voice of Gluto

Guest stars

- Sean Cw Johnson as Carter Grayson, the Red Lightspeed Ranger
- Michael Chaturantabut as Chad Lee, the Blue Lightspeed Ranger
- Keith Robinson as Joel Rawlings, the Green Lightspeed Ranger
- Sasha Williams as Kelsey Winslow, the Yellow Lightspeed Ranger
- Alison MacInnis as Dana Mitchell, the Pink Lightspeed Ranger
- Rhett Fisher as Ryan Mitchell, the Titanium Ranger
- Jennifer L. Yen as Vypra

== Episodes ==
No.	Title	Directed by	Written by	Original release date
1	"Force from the Future"	Koichi Sakamoto	Judd Lynn & Jackie Marchand	February 3, 2001
2	"Force from the Future"	Koichi Sakamoto	Judd Lynn & Jackie Marchand	February 10, 2001
1000 years in the future, a notorious mutant criminal named Ransik is captured and sentenced to be cryogenically frozen. But he escapes as he and his followers Nadira and Frax make their way to a time ship where they take control of the prison before they can cryogenically freeze the criminal Gluto. Alex, the Red Time Force Ranger, tries to stop them, but Ransik kills him and escapes to the past. Alex dies in his fiance Jen Scotts's arms and she takes his Red Chrono Morpher. Jen, Katie Walker, Lucas Kendall, and Trip grab the Chrono Morphers and follow Ransik into the past. The four land in the city of Silver Hills in the year 2001. When they find Ransik, Nadira, Frax, and Gluto, the Rangers discover that they cannot morph. Alex's DNA is the key to unlocking the other four morphers. Sadly, the four can't find someone who shares Alex's DNA and start giving up until they find someone who looks identical to Alex. Jen talks to him, but he refuses to believe that Jen is from the future. Jen, disappointed, walks back to the others. Ransik launches his first attack, but it doesn't go well since the Rangers can't morph. The man, Wes Collins, comes to help and takes the Red Chrono Morpher, allowing Jen, Trip, Katie, and Lucas to morph into the Red, Pink, Green, Yellow, and Blue Time Force Rangers. In the end, Jen takes the morpher back from Wes, stating that they don't need his help.
3	"Something to Fight For"	Koichi Sakamoto	Judd Lynn & Jackie Marchand	February 17, 2001
Wes witnesses a bank robbery by some mutants and tries to help. The Rangers arrive and Jen tells him that he is not fighting and doubts that Wes has ever done anything to help anyone other than himself. Later, Trip tells Wes about Alex and the future. Wes and Jen talk, and a mutant attacks the city. Jen offers Wes another chance to prove himself by giving him Alex's morpher. After the battle, Wes offers the morpher back to Jen, but Jen says he's earned it.
4	"Ransik Lives"	Kaizo Hayashi	Judd Lynn & Jackie Marchand	February 24, 2001
Wes offers the Rangers a place to stay; a clock tower that his father owns. They set up the clock tower as their home, and Wes helps them blend into the present. While Wes and Jen get some food, a businessman walks in and notices an old sign on the clock tower entrance, advertising odd jobs. He hires Wes and Jen for some painting at a news station. Ransik attacks the news station, broadcasts his demands for Silver Hills to surrender or be destroyed, and captures Wes. He tells Wes about how he was treated in the future, causing Wes to have some doubts.
5	"A Blue Streak"	Kaizo Hayashi	Judd Lynn & Jackie Marchand	March 3, 2001
Wes allows Lucas to drive his sports car, unaware that Lucas is a race car driver. He is cited by the police officer and must get a 2001 driver's license. A mutant with a knack for speed leads Lucas on a chase during his driving exam. Meanwhile, Trip breaks out the Vector Cycles.
6	"A Parting of Ways"	Worth Keeter	Judd Lynn & Jackie Marchand	March 10, 2001
Ransik sends a mutant kidnapper to capture a busload of children and holds them for a $10 million ransom. While the Rangers try to locate the children and free them, Wes asks his father help pay the ransom, but his father refuses. Wes tricks a business client of his father into giving him a check, and offers the money to Nadira and the mutants, but they refuse to release the hostages. Thus, Wes ended up taking the money back from Nadira and helps the other Rangers save the kids and defeat the mutant. When Wes comes home with the money, his father is angry. The press finds out about the money and thinks that Mr. Collins has donated it willingly to free the hostages. Wes tells them that Mr. Collins' idea to donate the money to charity before telling his father that he does not want any part of his father's business anymore. Wes goes to the Clock Tower and asks the Rangers if he can move in with them; they welcome him home.
7	"Short-Circuited"	Worth Keeter	Judd Lynn & Jackie Marchand	March 17, 2001
Nadira watches as Circuit helps the Rangers in battle. Realizing that Circuit summons the Time Force Megazord, Nadira hatches a plan to keep Circuit from assisting them by summoning Medicon. Meanwhile, Trip uses his Gem to read Lucas' mind during a card game with Wes and is forbidden from using his Gem for a day. While taking a walk with Circuit, Trip rescues a woman being chased by Cyclobots, and the woman turns out to be Nadira, who takes advantage of Trip's good nature and kidnaps Circuit. She then has Medicon rewire Circuit. When the mutant attacks the city and grows giant, Wes attempts to communicate with Circuit to summon their Time Flyers but cannot. Trip then told the other Rangers that Circuit had been kidnapped by Nadira, unable to call the Time Force Megazord. Lucas tells Trip that it's okay to use his powers and orders him to search for Circuit. Will he find Circuit in time?
8	"Jen's Revenge"	Koichi Sakamoto	Judd Lynn	March 24, 2001
Jen tracks down Fatcatfish, a mutant that she's encountered before, and she wants to kill him for personal reasons.
9	"The Time Shadow"	Koichi Sakamoto	Judd Lynn	March 31, 2001
Mr. Collins' company develops the Raimei Destroyer, an armored tank to defend itself against Ransik's attacks. But it's no match for the robot Tronicon who was created by Frax using a Trixyrium Crystal (which shouldn't be invented for 100 years). With the Rangers' Megazord unavailable after being too badly damaged in their last battle with the mutant Izout, all hope seems lost. But in the future, a mysterious figure helps out and sends them the Time Shadow Megazord.
10	"Future Unknown"	Judd Lynn	Judd Lynn & Jackie Marchand	April 7, 2001
The Rangers try to find some 21st Century weapons to help them. They discover that some technology was developed as a result of Ransik's attacks. Consequently, the future has been altered. This creates doubts for Katie, who starts to question their reasons for being at this time. Now, each Ranger must find their own motivation for stopping Frax' newest mutant, which he unleashed from the X-Vault (a secret storage area where only the most dangerous mutants are kept) in the city after being berated by Ransik for his use of Tronicon.
11	"Uniquely Trip"	Judd Lynn	Judd Lynn & Jackie Marchand	April 14, 2001
Trip begins to feel like he's not contributing to the Rangers. He tries to emulate the others, but ends up causing more problems. As Ransik releases a mutant who feeds off electricity, Trip realizes how he helps the team in their battles and finishes building a new weapon; the Electro Booster.
12	"Worlds Apart"	Isaac Florentine	Judd Lynn & Jackie Marchand	April 21, 2001
While driving to work, Mr. Collins spots Wes and his friends picking up trash. Mr. Collins tells his son how bitterly disappointed he is in him. The Silver Guardians arrive as Nadira and some Cyclobots attack a business. The Rangers, in their civilian guise, watch as the Guardians easily handle the Cyclobots. One of the Guardians, Eric Meyers, spots Wes. Eric talks to Wes, and it turns out that they went to the same Prep School. Frax unleashes another mutant from the X-Vault, and the Silver Guardians arrive. However, they can't handle him. The Rangers show up, and Wes takes a shot intended for the Guardian's commander, damaging Wes' helmet. Mr. Collins and Eric realize that Wes is the Red Ranger. Mr. Collins tries to talk to Wes to join the Silver Guardians, but Wes refuses and charges off into battle.
13	"The Quantum Quest"	Isaac Florentine	Judd Lynn & Jackie Marchand	April 28, 2001
On an excavation, some researchers discover a metallic artifact. As word of the discovery spreads, Ransik recognizes the object as the Quantum Controller and unleashes a mutant to get it for him. Circuit also recognizes the artifact. The Rangers try to recover it before it falls into the wrong hands. As the Rangers fight the mutant, Eric manages to take the controller and hides it away. He then tries to become the Guardian's new leader but is turned down. When he eventually goes back to where the controller is, the mutant attacks again. As the Rangers fight the mutant, Wes tries to convince Eric to give up the controller, but he ignores him and activates the Quantum Controller, becoming the Quantum Ranger in the process.
14	"Clash for Control"	Koichi Sakamoto	Judd Lynn & Jackie Marchand	May 5, 2001
15	"Clash for Control"	Koichi Sakamoto	Judd Lynn & Jackie Marchand	May 12, 2001
Even without the Quantum Morpher, Ransik wants to possess the Quantasaurus Rex, the Quantum Ranger's Zord. He sends Commandocon to retrieve it. The Rangers try to talk Eric into giving up the morpher, but he refuses. They witness a time portal opening, realizing they're after the Q-Rex, Eric summons the Eagle flyer - with Wes jumping on board - and enters the portal to the past, where Wes & Eric try to locate the Q-Rex. Unfortunately, Commandocon gets to it first, takes control, and journeys back with it to the 21st century. Eric and Wes follow him through the time portal. The Q-Rex is rampaging in the city. The Rangers need the Quantum Morpher to get control of the Q-Rex. While Wes tries to talk to Eric, Mr. Collins makes the other Rangers an offer to join the Silver Guardians; with his company, they could defeat Ransik faster.
16	"Bodyguard in Blue"	Koichi Sakamoto	Judd Lynn & Jackie Marchand	May 19, 2001
Dr. Michael Zaskin, one of Bio-Lab's scientists, tries to unlock the secrets of the Quantum morpher, and is kidnapped. His daughter, Holly, escapes and tries to hire Lucas as her bodyguard. Lucas is hesitant but then finds out who her father is. While the other Rangers rescue Zaskin, Lucas protects Holly.
17	"The Legend of the Clock Tower"	Yoshi Hosoya	Judd Lynn	May 19, 2001
The Rangers try to fix the clock in the tower but have no luck. Wes tells them about a ghost that is supposed to inhabit the tower. That night, Katie hears a noise and she investigates. She finds herself in the past and meets the people from Wes' story. With her help, there's a different ending. Then, she wakes up because of a mutant attack. After the battle, she tells her friends about her dream and how the end changed, but Wes corrects her and says that's how he had told it, leaving her wondering if it was a dream.
18	"Trust and Triumph"	Koichi Sakamoto	Judd Lynn & Jackie Marchand	June 2, 2001
Jen tells Wes to guard the back of a bank so the Rangers can cut off Nadira's escape route. However, the Silver Guardians show up, and Wes tries to deal with them, which gave Nadira a chance to escape. Jen is upset with Wes and says she can't trust him. Meanwhile, Turtlecon attacks and sends the Rangers to a different dimension, and after a short battle with their duplicate Rangers, Wes and Jen escape. They have to learn to trust each other if they want to rescue their friends.
19	"Trip Takes a Stand"	Isaac Florentine	Judd Lynn & Jackie Marchand	June 9, 2001
Frax releases Notacon only to find out that he's a gentle mutant. Frax attaches a device to Notacon to control him, but he escapes. In the city, people are afraid of Notacon due to his appearance. Trip finds him and learns that he was frozen for stealing vegetables because he was hungry, but only did so because he was discriminated against, and he now desires to go back into the vault. However, Eric shows up wanting to kill Notacon out of prejudice, and is willing to do almost anything to accomplish his goal. Trip must stand up to Frax and Eric to save Notacon and send him back to containment.
20	"Quantum Secrets"	Makoto Yokoyama	Judd Lynn & Jackie Marchand	June 16, 2001
As researchers work on unlocking the secrets of the Quantum Morpher, Ransik releases Conwing to take control of the Q-Rex. Conwing captures Eric, takes his morpher, and replicates Eric's voice, which lets him take control of the Q-Rex. Eric finds out where the morpher comes from. The Rangers show up and try to help, but Eric wants to handle it alone. He suddenly gets some help from the future and uses the Mega Battle Armor. Will Eric reveal the Ranger's secrets? Note: This episode is dedicated to the memory of Minoru Uchiyama, who was the costume designer and makeup artist for various Super Sentai series.
21	"The Last Race"	Isaac Florentine	Judd Lynn & Jackie Marchand	July 7, 2001
Lucas is ticketed for reckless driving (despite his teammates causing it) and is required to attend traffic school. Nadira releases Dash, a former racing champion, to be her driver. The Rangers arrive, Dash and Lucas recognize each other. Dash caused a massive accident while street racing and Lucas had to testify against him. Dash challenges him to one last race. If Lucas wins, he promises to accept responsibility for his actions and turn himself in. However, Nadira has other plans for him. Ultimately, Dash stops the race when he crashed Lucas' traffic school driving exam when he nearly causes another accident, but Nadira forces him to fight. He is defeated and willingly surrenders but asks Lucas to be the one who refreezes him, which he does.
22	"Lovestruck Rangers"	Worth Keeter	Judd Lynn & Jackie Marchand	June 23, 2001
The male Rangers all seem to be attracted to the same girl for different reasons. When it starts to cause friction in the team, Jen orders them to stop seeing her. Hearing that Wes missed a job, Jen tracks him down and finds that he's still seeing the same girl, who it turns out is a mutant named Contemptra. Now, it's up to Jen and Katie to free their teammates from her influence. Jen breaks the mutant's control bracelet, and the Rangers capture her.
23	"Full Exposure"	Worth Keeter	Judd Lynn & Jackie Marchand	July 14, 2001
A photographer working for a tabloid is given a new assignment to take pictures of the Rangers in their civilian guise. He needs help carrying his equipment and hires Katie to help him. His first attempt fails, and Katie manages to warn the others. Katie sticks with him so she can keep tabs on him. Meanwhile, Artillicon attacks again, and the Rangers attack backfires, resulting in them reverting to their civilian identities. As the photographer prepares to sell his pictures, Katie tries to talk him out of it.
24	"Movie Madness"	Koichi Sakamoto	Judd Lynn & Jackie Marchand	July 21, 2001
25	"Movie Madness"	Koichi Sakamoto	Judd Lynn & Jackie Marchand	July 28, 2001
The Rangers find out that a movie is being filmed nearby. Jen initially refuses to go, but then she learns that it's starring her favorite movie star, Frankie Chan. The Rangers watch the filming, and when a stuntman is injured, Wes volunteers to replace him. As Wes films his fight scene, he soon realizes that the action is way too real. Cinecon then reveals his trap and sends the Rangers to different dimensions where they're trapped inside their favorite movie genres. During the battle with Cinecon, Circuit tries to get Eric to help, but Eric gets sent into a Jungle movie. Wes and Trip figure a way to free everyone. They appear on set, and the Cyclobots give chase. Cinecon puts the Rangers in their Megazord and summons the Q-Rex. He wants to destroy all the Rangers, even summoning the Transwarp Megazord from the future. Everything has been written for Cinecon's movie "End of the Rangers," but the Rangers' chances of finding another ending seemed slim, when Trip reveals he stole the last page of the script. Without it, the Rangers can write their ending, using their Megazords to defeat Cinecon and refreeze him.
26	"Time Force Traitor"	Koichi Sakamoto	Judd Lynn & Jackie Marchand	August 4, 2001
A former Time Force officer named Steelix seeks revenge on Jen for getting him locked up. He steals her morpher, fights her on her own, then turns her insane. Wes breaks Jen out of the spell, and all of the Rangers defeat Steelix.
27	"Frax's Fury"	Koichi Sakamoto	Judd Lynn & Jackie Marchand	August 11, 2001
Frax unleashes Venomark in the city. Venomark attacks the Rangers, and everyone but Wes falls victim to his bite. Ransik finds out that Venomark has been freed and goes after him since Venomark attacked him in the future. This attack led to him being nursed by Dr. Lou Ferricks before leaving him for dead. Now, Ransik wants revenge. Wes notices Ransik taking serum to fight off the effects of Venomark's poison and gets a sample to his father so that they can mass-produce a cure for everyone affected. The Rangers defeat Venomark, and the cure is distributed to everyone. Frax's real identity is revealed to be Dr. Ferricks as he reveals to Ransik that he was the one who almost killed him, as Frax destroys all of Ransik's medicine.
28	"Dawn of Destiny"	Worth Keeter	Judd Lynn & Jackie Marchand	August 18, 2001
Wes explains to Jen that the serum was replicated thanks to Bio-Lab, and Jen warns him to get his father to call off making any more, as allowing Bio-Lab to continue mass-producing the serum may cause the future to be altered. Unfortunately, Wes' father refuses, and Ransik sends a new mutant, Severax, to launch an attack, while hunting down Frax along the way. Since all of his medicine was destroyed, he goes to Bio-Lab and almost kills Wes' father in the process. In the end, Jen mentions that if they don't stop Ransik soon, the entire future will change. Then, a figure from Time Force arrives, saying that it has already changed. He reveals himself to be Alex.
29	"Fight Against Fate"	Worth Keeter	Judd Lynn & Jackie Marchand	August 25, 2001
As Albert Collins lies gravely injured in the hospital, Alex takes his morpher back from Wes, telling him that his destiny to run his father's company is set in stone, and that Albert will die tomorrow. Alex leads the Rangers in a battle against Frax's new powerful robot called Dragontron. However, his attitude and leadership style creates friction within the group.
30	"Destiny Defeated"	Worth Keeter	Judd Lynn & Jackie Marchand	September 8, 2001
Alex's leadership has created friction as the other Rangers disapprove his methods. They try to fight Frax's machine, to no avail. Wes has taken over his father's company but hates it, and Eric contemplates leaving the city. Later, Wes learns from Dr. Zaskin (who was there when his father got attacked and overheard him) that his father was proud of him making his way and wanted him to remain with the Rangers. He goes back to the clock tower and thinks of his life as a Ranger. Meanwhile, the Time Force Megazord is immobilized, and Alex orders the team to fight on, claiming that they don't care about the future. The Rangers start arguing with Alex, telling him that they preferred Wes as the Red Ranger; Alex has lost Jen's support. Wes arrives and helps his friends, and Jen convinces Alex to give the morpher back to Wes. With Wes in command, the Rangers battle the robot with the Time Force Megazord Mode Red. With help from the Q-Rex, the Rangers enact a crazy plan Wes comes up with, and Dragontron is destroyed. Mr. Collins nearly dies, but Alex saves him with future technology. Alex returns to the future, finally accepting Wes' role as red ranger, and his point of view that everyone chooses their own destiny.
31	"Undercover Rangers"	Koichi Sakamoto	Judd Lynn & Jackie Marchand	September 15, 2001
After Alex leaves, Jen realizes that she has feelings for someone else due to his change in personality. Meanwhile, Katie and Trip witness the owner of a new fitness club giving an individual some juice and is amazed when he displays superhuman strength. Wes and Jen go undercover at the club to see if anything is going on. When Jen winds up in peril, Alex contacts Wes and gives him the Strata Cycle.
32	"Beware the Knight"	Koichi Sakamoto	Judd Lynn & Jackie Marchand	September 22, 2001
While returning to the Clock Tower with pizza, Trip is attacked by a mysterious black knight on a horse, who then vanishes into the forest. The knight is after something that is guarded by a dragon—the Battle Fire.
33	"Time for Lightspeed"	Koichi Sakamoto	Judd Lynn & Jackie Marchand	September 29, 2001
Vypra aligns with Ransik to release a super demon named Quarganon to destroy the world. The Time Force Rangers team up with the Lightspeed Rangers to combat this threat. Guest Stars: Michael Chaturantabut, Rhett Fisher, Sean Cw Johnson, Alison MacInnis, Keith Robinson, Sasha Williams and Jennifer L. Yen.
34	"Reflections of Evil"	Jonathan Tzachor	Judd Lynn & Jackie Marchand	October 6, 2001
A mutant named Miracon transports the Rangers into a mirror world, where the Rangers must escape by destroying new and old mutant enemies.
35	"Nadira's Dream Date"	Worth Keeter	Judd Lynn & Jackie Marchand	October 13, 2001
Lucas writes a romantic poem about his first love; his first racecar. During a battle against Ransik's forces, he unknowingly drops it, and Nadira picks it up, believing that Lucas has romantic feelings for her. When Ransik learns about this, he warns Lucas him to treat his daughter right or face his wrath. Thanks to the other Rangers on the second date, Ransik dispatches Chameliacon to destroy Lucas.
36	"Circuit Unsure"	Worth Keeter	Judd Lynn & Jackie Marchand	October 20, 2001
The Rangers ask Circuit about historical events. Realizing that Circuit has access to events up to their own time, they ask Circuit about upcoming events. But someone in the future does not want them to find out and prevents Circuit from revealing the information. Thinking that he malfunctioned, Circuit loses confidence, just as a mutant named Serpicon leads an attack on the Silver Hills Space Center. Serpicon leads Cyclobots into taking hostages and setting the building to self-destruct. Ultimately, it comes down to Circuit to help deactivate the self-destruct sequence, but he lacks the self-confidence to do so until Alex contacts him and reveals that the Rangers must not know the future, and he acted to prevent them from finding out. Once the self-destruct sequence is deactivated, Serpicon grows and Eric summons the Q-Rex. Circuit gets badly damaged and can't call for the Time Force Megazord. The Rangers summon the Time Jet which helps the Q-Rex defeat Serpicon. Afterward, Circuit is repaired, but lies and says that the future will be fine. This episode was dedicated to Thuy Trang, who died in a car accident on September 3, 2001. She played Trini Kwan in the original Mighty Morphin Power Rangers from 1993 to 1994.
37	"A Calm Before the Storm"	Worth Keeter	Judd Lynn & Jackie Marchand	October 27, 2001
With Ransik's mutants depleted, the Rangers ponder their past and future as Rangers. However, Mr. Collins begins to perfect Trixyrium Crystals, and Wes convinces him to not make them to avoid altering the future. Meanwhile, Frax's new robot, Max Axe, terrorizes the city as Ransik hears about it. Max Axe is destroyed by Eric and the Q-Rex. Watching from afar, Ransik orders Gluto to find Frax.
38	"The End of Time"	Koichi Sakamoto	Judd Lynn & Jackie Marchand	November 3, 2001
39	"The End of Time"	Koichi Sakamoto	Judd Lynn & Jackie Marchand	November 10, 2001
40	"The End of Time"	Koichi Sakamoto	Judd Lynn & Jackie Marchand	November 17, 2001
Part 1: Ransik prepares to attack the city. Alex orders the Time Force Rangers to return to the future, as the Trixyrium Crystals are causing temporal disruptions, telling them that if they don't leave now, they might not be able to return to their own time. The Rangers refuse and try to prevent the attack. Wes knows that his friends can't stay in the present and has a plan to send them back. Wes forces the other Rangers back to their own time with the plan to fight to the death to save the city, making him and Eric responsible for defending it. Meanwhile, Gluto finds where Frax is hiding and informs Ransik. While apprehending Frax, Ransik sees his latest robot, Doomtron, and plans to make one final use of Frax. Meanwhile, Nadira learns the value of humanity when she and Trip help deliver a baby. Ransik has Frax reprogrammed, so he no longer remembers anything about being human or being born as Dr. Ferricks, but not before he desperately tells Nadira that she doesn't have to hate humans. When she learns about Frax's brainwashing, she becomes disenchanted with her father's mission. Part 2: In the future, the Rangers discover what happened; the city was ultimately saved, but Wes lost his life fighting for it. They're ordered to have their minds erased of their adventures to adjust back to their lives in their own time. However, they're unwilling to give up their memories and decide to go back to help Wes. Jen gives Alex back her engagement ring, and breaks up with him, but not without Alex telling the Rangers how to go back to 2001. Eric gets injured, so Wes is left alone to fight the Cyclobot army, armed with Eric's Quantum Morpher and Quantum Defender. Part 3: As the battle with Ransik's army rages on, the other Rangers arrive and temporarily disable Doomtrom. After the Rangers defeat the Cyclobot army, Wes, now in control of Q-Rex, neutralizes its Trixyrium Crystal with the Quantum Defender, stopping the time disruptions and allowing him to use it on Doomtron and Frax, destroying them both. Nadira mourns Frax's death, but Ransik berates her and pushes her aside. The Rangers then battle Ransik but are overpowered. During the fight, Ransik accidentally shoots Nadira, who was protecting a baby after changing her opinion on humans, and uses the baby to convince Ransik that humans aren't so bad. Ransik willingly surrenders to the Rangers, and the Rangers have to return to the future without Wes to their great sadness. Then, Wes and Jen confess their love for each other. With the other Rangers gone, Mr. Collins offers his son command of the Silver Guardians who will protect the city for free. Wes agrees as long as Eric is his co-commander, which he agrees to.

== Awards and nominations ==
Year	Award	Category	Nominee	Result
2002	29th Daytime Emmy Awards	Outstanding Sound Mixing	Chuck Buch and Edward F. Suski	Nominated

== Comics ==
Characters have been featured in Power Rangers comics published by Boom! Studios.

In 2018, the Time Force Rangers appeared in "Shattered Grid", a crossover event between teams from all eras commemorating the 25th anniversary of the original television series. It was published in Mighty Morphin Power Rangers #25-30 and various tie-ins.

In 2020, Power Rangers: Sins of the Future by Matthew Erman, Trey Moore and Giuseppe Cafaro was published. An original graphic novel taking place after the events of the Power Rangers Time Force television series, it features Jen and Wes being pursued by a new antagonist: the Black Time Force Ranger.
