= Michael Chaturantabut =

Thai actor and stuntman (born 1975)

- Born: April 30, 1975 (age 51); Rayong, Thailand
- Style: Wushu, Shōrei-ryū Karate, Taekwondo
- Teacher: John Sharkey Jr.
- Rank: Black Belt in Karate 6th degree black belt in Taekwondo
- Years active: 1995–present

Other information
- Notable students: Matt Mullins; Taylor Lautner
- Website: XMA Official Website

Michael Chaturantabut (born April 30, 1975) is a Thai American actor, martial artist and stuntman, known for his role as Chad Lee, the Blue Ranger in Power Rangers Lightspeed Rescue. He was born in Rayong Province, Thailand.

== Extreme martial arts ==
Xtreme Martial Arts or XMA is a brand name owned by Chaturantabut. Chaturantabut's XMA is a combination of elements from martial arts, acrobatics and gymnastics, with an emphasis on showmanship.

The concept of adding gymnastics-like tumbling moves to elements of traditional martial arts is otherwise known as "tricking". XMA makes these exhibition moves the focus of the sport. Open hand and weapons choreography are often accompanied by dramatic dance or programmatic music. The goal is to command the attention of the audience.

Schools teaching XMA or similar martial arts styles operate in the United States, Australia, Canada, New Zealand, and the United Kingdom, with world headquarters in North Hollywood, California. The style includes aerial acrobatic movements, with training focused on physical agility, balance, strength, coordination, endurance, and performance technique.

He feels that there are many basic moves that can be specialized to be more acrobatic, flashy and artistic, so as to give the impression of complexity and difficulty for showmanship purposes. It is for this reason that he feels that even the basic athlete or beginner can learn the progression from basic moves to highly complex acrobatic sequences.

== Filmography ==
Year	Film/television	Role	Notes
1995	Fight Zone	Captain Kick	Alt. title: Future Fights
1996	WMAC-Masters	Wizard / Himself	
1998	Martial Law	Guest part	One episode
1998–99	Mortal Kombat: Conquest	Stunt double: Kung Lao	
2000	Power Rangers Lightspeed Rescue	Chad Lee / Blue Lightspeed Ranger	Main cast
2001	Power Rangers Time Force	Chad Lee / Blue Lightspeed Ranger	Crossover/Guest Cameo
2001	Nash Bridges	Hired thug	Episode 'Bear Trap'
2002	The Time Machine	Eloi	
2002	Charmed	Bodyguard	Episode 'Which Way Now?'
2002	Austin Powers in Goldmember	Gunman at pool	Uncredited
2002	Big Fat Liar	Stunt actor	Alt. title: Pay or Play
2003	How to Be an Action Star	Himself	
2003	XMA: Extreme Martial Arts	Himself	Documentary
2004	Power Rangers Dino Thunder	Chad Lee, Blue Ranger	archive footage
2005	Sledge: The Untold Story	Stunts	
2005	Little Manhattan	Himself / Mike Chat	
2006	Bo bui gai wak	Trainer for Mike Moh	Alt. title: Baby
2012	Photo Finish (short)	Albert Fong	Stunt coordinator
2018	The Rookie	Shotgun	

== Personal life ==
Chaturantabut was trained at Sharkey's Karate Studios located in Naperville and Momence, Illinois. He was formerly married to McKenzie Satterthwaite and is also the founder of Extreme Martial Arts.

Chaturantabut is also the father of two sons, Talin and Gaige.

Chatrantabut attended Naperville North High School in Naperville, Illinois.

== Notable facts ==
Chaturantabut was also Taylor Lautner's martial artist coach and encouraged him to get into acting.
