= Power Rangers Lost Galaxy =

American tokusatsu television series

- Genre: Action-adventure; Drama; Science fantasy; Superhero
- Created by: Haim Saban; Toei Company
- Based on: Seijuu Sentai Gingaman by Toei Company
- Developed by: Saban Entertainment; Toei Company
- Showrunner: Judd Lynn
- Directed by: Jonathan Tzachor; Worth Keeter; Blair Treu; Koichi Sakamoto; Ryuta Tasaki; Steve Wang; Jim Mathers; Judd Lynn
- Starring: Archie Kao; Reggie Rolle; Danny Slavin; Valerie Vernon; Cerina Vincent; Russell Lawrence; Amy Miller; Melody Perkins; Paul Schrier
- Composers: Lior Rosner; Jeremy Sweet; Inon Zur; Shuki Levy; Kussa Mahchi
- Countries of origin: United States; Japan
- Original language: English
- No. of episodes: 45

Production
- Executive producers: Haim Saban; Shuki Levy
- Producer: Jonathan Tzachor
- Production locations: California (Greater Los Angeles Area) (Santa Clarita & Los Angeles); Japan (Greater Tokyo Area) (Tokyo, Saitama, Yokohama and Kyoto)
- Cinematography: Ilan Rosenberg; Sean McLin (2nd unit)
- Running time: 20 minutes
- Production companies: Saban Entertainment; Fox Kids Worldwide; Renaissance Atlantic Entertainment; Toei Company, Ltd. MMPR Productions, Inc.

Original release
- Network: Fox (Fox Kids)
- Release: February 6 – December 18, 1999

Related
- Power Rangers television series

Power Rangers Lost Galaxy is a tokusatsu television series and the seventh entry of the Power Rangers franchise, based on the 22nd Super Sentai series Seijuu Sentai Gingaman. The series was the first to follow the Sentai tradition of a new cast with each new series with minimal costume and prop elements being recycled from Denji Sentai Megaranger. The seventh series marked the final season to feature Bulk (Paul Schrier) as a main character and he was the last original cast member to leave the show.

Kendrix Morgan (Valerie Vernon), the first Pink Galaxy Ranger for this series, was briefly killed off two-thirds through the season, marking the first time that a Ranger was killed off in the series. Kendrix was temporarily written out of the show as Vernon had temporarily departed to seek treatment for leukemia. Her treatment was successful and she returned for the season finale.

== Synopsis ==
Far away on the distant planet Mirinoi, a group of tribe people gather around to hear the story of the Quasar Sabers, five mystical swords that will select only those worthy of pulling them out of the stone they were set in 3,000 years prior. As those gathered take turns attempting to pull the swords out with no luck, they are ambushed by monsters led by Furio.

Back on Earth, a space colony called Terra Venture is preparing to set out through the cosmos in search of a new world like Earth. A young man named Leo Corbett attempts to get onto the space colony, but is kicked out for not having a passport. After saving an old lady from a group of thugs, he decides to stow away onto a transport shuttle to sneak on board. However, Leo is forced to disguise himself as a soldier to elude officers chasing him and wind on a combat training mission on the moon, much to the surprise of crew members Kai Chen, Kendrix Morgan and Leo's brother, Mike Corbett.

Suddenly, a portal opens and a tribe girl from Mirinoi named Maya falls through. After telling the group of her planet's plight, Kendrix and Mike follow Maya back through the portal, with Kai taking Leo back. However, Leo escapes and goes through the portal, leaving Kai behind when he comes across a flyer for a museum tour of the Astro Megaship. Believing the Megaship is the only vessel capable of reaching Mirinoi, Kai meets Alpha 6 and the Megaship's mechanic, Damon Henderson, who helps Kai fly off in the Megaship to try and find Mike, Maya, Kendrix, and Leo.

Once the group unites on Mirinoi, Mike pulls the first Quasar Saber and deflects Furio's attack. Kai, Damon, Kendrix, and Maya, then pull a Quasar Saber each out of the stone, being revealed as the chosen ones. Furio, upset that he was not able to get the swords for himself or his master, drives his sword into the ground, causing everything and everyone around to slowly turn to stone.

The team runs off before Furio forces a crevice open in the ground. Mike falls into the crevice, and tries to hold on but is unable to, passing his Quasar Saber onto Leo before falling. With the Quasar Sabers beginning to energize, a heartbroken Leo and the other 4 morph into the Lost Galaxy Power Rangers, chasing off Furio and his foot soldiers before having to get off of Mirinoi due to its stone petrification, returning to Terra Venture just in time as the colony begins its quest for the new world.

The Rangers battle space villains from two different parts of the galaxy who include Scorpius, his daughter Trakeena and Deviot. Along the way, they discover the Galactabeasts (which eventually gain the power to combine into the Galaxy Megazord) and ally with the mysterious Magna Defender, a warrior who sought revenge against Scorpius for the death of his son, Zika. Though he later dies, he manages to reveal that his host body is Mike and passes the Magna Defender powers to him.

When Deviot revives the evil Psycho Rangers, the Rangers of Power Rangers in Space show up to aid the Galaxy Rangers in destroying them. During this saga, Kendrix, the Pink Ranger, sacrifices herself to protect the Pink Space Ranger and Terra Venture from Psycho Pink. Karone, sister of the Red Space Ranger Andros and former evil princess Astronema, is given the powers of the Pink Ranger from Kendrix (who appears as a spirit), and joins the Rangers in the battle to protect Terra Venture.

Deviot later reads secret words from the mystical Galaxy Book; sending Terra Venture and himself into the "Lost Galaxy". Here, the Rangers encounter Captain Mutiny and his Swabbies. These traveling space pirates live on the back of a massive space-faring dragon inside a castle. Deviot reemerges and joins the Captain's fight against the Rangers and attempts to turn all of the citizens of Terra Venture into his slaves. The colony escapes the Lost Galaxy after Mike sacrifices his powers to keep a portal open.

Deviot returns to Trakeena, but by this time, she has learned of his treachery and tries to destroy him. She chases him through the ship into a cocoon Scorpius made before he was destroyed, fusing them together and driving Trakeena insane. Using her army armed with suicide bombs, she cripples Terra Venture and destroys the Stratoforce and Centaurus Megazords. This forces the colony's people to evacuate to a nearby planet. Trakeena gives chase but the Rangers destroy her ship by self-destructing the Astro Megaship, but the explosion leaves Leo stranded on the moon. Trakeena, who survives the crash also, albeit scarred and injured, finally reaches her breaking point and uses the cocoon to transform into an insectoid creature to enter Terra Venture's wreck and use her power to set it on a crash course to the planet below to destroy it and the people. Leo and the other Rangers try to stop her, but are slowly outmatched by Trakeena's new power. She is only defeated after Leo, using his Battlizer, blasts her at point-blank range nearly destroying himself in the process. By this time, the colony is nearly crashed but the Galaxy Megazord diverts its course and lands it on a large clearing in an explosion. The colonists, having feared the worse for the Rangers, are relieved and overjoyed when they come out of the explosion on the Galactabeasts. After this, the Zords reveal to the Rangers they had landed on Mirinoi and return the swords to the stone altar. This restores its petrified inhabits and, to the joy of the Rangers, restores Kendrix to life as well. After this the colonists settle on Mirinoi, the new world.

== Cast and characters ==
=== Galaxy Rangers ===
- Danny Slavin as Leo Corbett, Galaxy Red
- Reggie Rolle as Damon Henderson, Galaxy Green
- Archie Kao as Kai Chen, Galaxy Blue
- Cerina Vincent as Maya, Galaxy Yellow
- Valerie Vernon as Kendrix Morgan, the original Galaxy Pink
- Melody Perkins as Karone, the new Galaxy Pink
- Russell Lawrence as Mike Corbett, the new Magna Defender

=== Supporting characters ===
- Wendee Lee as the voice of Alpha 6
- Donene Kistleras Alpha 6 (Episodes 10–11)
- Heide Karp as Alpha 6 (Episodes 14–15)
- Michelle Tillman as Alpha 6 (Episodes 29–44)
- Julie Maddalena as the voice of D.E.C.A.
- Tom Whyte as Commander Stanton
- Jack Betts as Councilor Brody
- Betty Hawkins as High Councilor Renier
- Kerrigan Mahan as the voice of the original Magna Defender
- Ryan James as Zika, the son of the original Magna Defender
- Paul Schrier as Farkus "Bulk" Bulkmeier
- Jack Banning as Professor Phenomenus

==== Space Rangers ====
The Space Rangers from In Space make a guest appearance in Lost Galaxy' 30th and 31st episodes ("To the Tenth Power" and "The Power of Pink") for a team-up story in each episode:

- Christopher Khayman Lee as Andros, the Red Space Ranger
- Roger Velasco as Carlos Vallerte, the Black Space Ranger
- Selwyn Ward as T.J. Johnson, the Blue Space Ranger
- Tracy Lynn Cruz as Ashley Hammond, the Yellow Space Ranger
- Patricia Ja Lee as Cassie Chan, the Pink Space Ranger

=== Villains ===
- Amy Miller as Trakeena
- Kim Strauss as the voice of Scorpius
- Tom Wyner as the voice of Furio
- Derek Stephen Prince as the voice of Treacheron
- Bob Papenbrook as the voice of Deviot
- David Lodge as the voice of Villamax
- Richard Cansino as the voice of Kegler
- Mike Reynolds as the voice of Captain Mutiny
- Richard Epcar as the voice of Barbarax
- Rajia Baroudi as the voice of Hexuba

==== Villains allies ====
===== Psycho Rangers =====
The Psycho Rangers, the evil counterparts of the Space Rangers, are brought back by the villains of this series in episode 30 to assist them in a scheme to deal with the good Rangers - over the course of episodes 30 and 31, the Psycho Rangers are destroyed by the combined powers of the Space and Galaxy Rangers with Psycho Pink, the only Psycho Ranger to survive destruction in episode 30, being destroyed again in episode 31.

- Patrick David as the voice of Psycho Red
- Michael Maize as the voice of Psycho Black
- Wally Wingert as the voice of Psycho Blue
- Kamera Walton as the voice of Psycho Yellow
- Vicki Davis as the voice of Psycho Pink

== Episodes ==
No.	Title	Directed by	Written by	Original release date	Prod. code
1	"Quasar Quest"	Jonathan Tzachor	Judd Lynn	February 6, 1999	801
2	"Quasar Quest"	Jonathan Tzachor	Judd Lynn	February 13, 1999	802
The GSA is preparing to launch Terra Venture, a space colony on a mission to find a new world. However, a man named Leo also wants to travel aboard Terra Venture but has been denied a passport, and so he secretly stows himself aboard a shuttle and ends up on a last-minute training session with some Terra Venture fighters. Here he meets Kendrix, Kai, and surprisingly, his brother Mike. On the planet Mirinoi, a villain named Furio (working for a creature named Scorpius) is trying to steal the Quasar Sabers, five great swords with immense power put in a rock 3000 years ago, waiting for the chosen five to take them. Maya, a local of Mirinoi, is trying to escape the Sting Wingers and ends up going through a portal and meets Mike, Leo, Kai, and Kendrix. Here, she asks them for help. Mike and Kendrix go back with Maya to help her and, despite being told to stay with Kai, Leo follows. Kai feels guilty about leaving his teammates behind and decides to go after them aboard the Astro Megaship, which is now a museum. The ship's mechanic, Damon, along with Alpha 6, do not think the ship will fly as it has been out of action for so long. However, Damon lends a helping hand, and the Astro Megaship is flying once again. While in deep space, they find another wormhole and go through it. Meanwhile, Leo has caught up with Mike, Maya, and Kendrix and later meet up with Kai and Damon. They try to help Maya's tribe fight off Furio and the Sting Wingers. During the fight with Scorpius, Mike takes a Quaser Saber out of the rock, which then prompts Maya, Kai, Kendrix, and Damon to do the same, showing that they are the chosen ones. Enraged that he cannot have the Quaser Sabers, Furio turns the people of Mironoi to stone. Mike, Leo, Kai, Damon, Maya, and Kendrix escape, but Furio opens a massive crevice, leaving Mike hanging on the wall. Leo comes to help, but only manages to save the Quasar Saber. With Mike gone, the five heroes morph into Power Rangers and battle Furio and the Sting Wingers. The Megaship escapes just as Mirinoi turns to stone, and takes the new Rangers back to Terra Venture, which sets off on its long journey. Scorpius, however, follows the Rangers through the portal and swears revenge on them and Terra Venture.
3	"Race to the Rescue"	Worth Keeter	Judd Lynn	February 20, 1999	803
After hearing strange noises, Maya, along with Leo and Damon go to investigate a nearby planet only to be stopped by troops of Scorpius who have captured five gigantic animals. With Kai and Kendrix's help, they rescue the animals who turn out to be the Galactabeasts. Scorpius sends Furio and a monster named Radster to Terra Venture to capture the Quasar Sabers, where they prove to be a match for them when Radster grows giant. However, the Galactabeasts, wanting to return the favor, arrive on Terra Venture. Working together, Leo and the Lion Galactabeast destroy Radster.
4	"Rookie in Red"	Worth Keeter	Judd Lynn	February 27, 1999	804
Scorpius meets with a weapons dealer named Horn, and employs him to steal the Quasar Sabers. Kai is asked by Commander Stanton to train Leo as an officer due to the high scores he got on a test. After Leo does not listen to Kai and forgets to lock the Weapon Bay door, Horn breaks in and steals them all. Leo, feeling guilty, goes after Horn by himself. After tricking the monster, Leo and the Rangers get the Quasar Sabers back as well as the powerful Transdaggers.
5	"Homesick"	Blair Treu	Judd Lynn	March 6, 1999	805
A young stowaway named Matthew is found in the ship's control room trying to turn the ship around because he wants to go home, but because Terra Venture cannot replace the supplies that would be used in returning to Earth, it cannot be done. While he is learning the ropes with Damon, Terra Venture is attacked by a monster named Gasser, who puts everyone to sleep. Damon must leave Matthew to fend for himself when he is under attack by Furio and Sting Wingers. Matthew runs to the control base to look for help when he finds everyone is asleep. Ripping his suit, Matthew uses the rest of his willpower to lock Furio and the Sting Wingers in the lift. Meanwhile, the Galactabeasts arrive and suck up the gas but are turned to stone, so the Rangers infuse the Galactabeasts with the power of the Transdaggers to transform them into Galactazords and form the Galaxy Megazord to destroy Gasser. As a thank you for helping, the Rangers decide to take him back to Earth in the Astro Megaship.
6	"The Lights of Orion"	Blair Treu	Judd Lynn & Jackie Marchand	March 13, 1999	806
While investigating some energy readings, Maya and Kendrix are ambushed by Furio, Trakeena, and Sting Wingers. Furio shows the Rangers a large box, which has Mike inside. The Rangers make a plan which gives Leo a chance to free Mike, who tells Leo of the Lights of Orion, and that they need to get them before Furio. They go to the cave where they are kept, but Mike attacks Leo and takes the box and leaves Leo in the cave alone. It turns out a monster named Mutantrum was impersonating Mike, and gives the box to Furio, only to discover the box was empty.
7	"Double Duty"	Blair Treu	Judd Lynn	March 20, 1999	807
The Rangers notice a famous actress named Carolyn looks like Kendrix. When they go to see if she does, a monster called Wise Wizard attacks a camera that Carolyn's crew were using in hopes of finding the Lights of Orion. In the chaos, the monster attacks Kendrix's leg, while Carolyn fakes an injury. Her manager asks Kendrix to take over. She agrees, but does not do a great job when the pain from her leg comes back. Kendrix is determined to finish, but just as she does, Wise Wizard turns up again. With the help of the Rangers and the Galactabeasts, they kill Wise Wizard.
8	"The Blue Crush"	Blair Treu	Judd Lynn	March 27, 1999	808
While Kai is babysitting Commander Stanton's daughter Jodie, he falls for an attractive woman named Hannah. The next day, Kai coincidentally bumps into her and is attacked by one of Furio's monsters. As Kai and Hannah escape, he notices a man in her car named Johnny, who Kai thinks is her fiancee. Kai helps free Johnny and destroys the monster but is left feeling upset until Jodie brings Kai a package from Hannah saying that Hannah's sister's wedding was great and that she made a great bridesmaid.
9	"The Magna Defender"	Koichi Sakamoto	Carlton Holder	April 3, 1999	809
Thinking that he might be able to find a clue to Mike's whereabouts, Leo goes back to the caves where Furio lies, thinking that he found the Lights of Orion. As the battle commences, they realize they are equally matched, so Furio self-destructs himself in an attempt to take Leo down with him. Just as the other Rangers turn up to help, an unconscious Leo is brought out by a mysterious warrior known as the Magna Defender. Leo later goes back to the cave, and takes back to Kendrix a stone with something inside of it, which might have caught Furio's eye. Unable to open it, she takes it to another lab on Terra Venture and is attacked by a monster sent by Treacheron, the new general of Scorpius and Magna Defender's nemesis. The Magna Defender and the Rangers join the battle but lose the stone to the monster. As Trakeena tries to open it, the Rangers and the Magna Defender appear. With an attack from the Magna Defender's sword, he cracked the stone open and was surprised that the stone was empty.
10	"The Sunflower Search"	Ryuta Tasaki	Jill Donnellan	April 10, 1999	810
The Magna Defender explains he is out for revenge against Scorpius for killing his son. Believing that the Lights of Orion are in sunflower statues, the Rangers and the Magna Defender try to stop Scorpius' monster Fishface, but the Magna Defender is careless and almost hurts civilians.
11	"Silent Sleep"	Blair Treu	Jill Donnellan	April 17, 1999	811
Leo is struggling with horseback riding when the Chillyfish monster arrives to freeze the city. The Rangers investigate and all but Leo are frozen. After thinking that the Lights of Orion may unfreeze the colony, he tries to fight them off from the Magna Defender when an accidental blast releases them. Leo discovers that the animals are not affected by the Chillyfish's attacks, so he goes to find the horse he was on before. With the horse's help, he goes after the Chillyfish and destroys him, only for Chillyfish to go giant, prompting the Magna Defender to summon Torozord to fight, combining to form Defender Torozord to defeat the beast.
12	"Orion Rising"	Ryuta Tasaki	Denise Skinner	May 1, 1999	812
After Maya unknowingly eats a cake Kendrix baked for Damon's birthday, a quarrel between Maya and Kendrix escalates into a fight with one of Scorpius' monsters Destruxo, who has enclosed portions of Terra Venture into an invisible force field that is draining oxygen amongst the populus. When Maya later realizes her mistake, she and Kendrix make up and fight Destruxo, but he later escapes. Meanwhile, Magna Defender tries to destroy the force field manually, which could destroy the people as well. When the Rangers try to hold him back, Defender Torozord separates because of something occurring within the Magna Defender...
13	"Orion Returns"	Ryuta Tasaki	Judd Lynn & Jackie Marchand	May 8, 1999	813
Maya has a dream about the Lights of Orion, and when she wakes up the other Rangers to tell them, the lights appear before them. The Rangers pursue the Lights into Terra Venture, but Destruxo captures the lights. A battle escalates between Magna Defender, the Rangers and a weakened Destruxo, and the lights are released and given to the Rangers. Now with the Lights of Orion, the Rangers defeat Destruxo.
14	"Shark Attack"	Ryuta Tasaki	Judd Lynn & Jackie Marchand	May 15, 1999	814
Leo is attacked by Treacheron, who sends the Shark brothers to draw the other Rangers out. But as the Rangers try to activate the Lights of Orion without Leo, they fail because all five are needed for them to be activated. Meanwhile, Leo hears a voice he believes to be Mike, who tells him the Rangers need his help. Now at the scene, Leo and the other Rangers activate the Lights of Orion and battle the Shark brothers. Treacheron, however, vows to finish Leo, and their battle commences, with Leo finally destroying him and the Shark Brothers, thanks to the Lights of Orion enhancing the Galaxy Megazord.
15	"Redemption Day"	Ryuta Tasaki	Judd Lynn & Jackie Marchand	May 22, 1999	815
The Scorpion Stinger is losing fuel quickly, and Scorpius thinks that Terra Venture's Lava dome is the best place to sort his problems. Magna Defender also wants to blow up the colony to enact his revenge on Scorpius. The Rangers try to stop both of them, and Scorpius sends down a monster called Freaky-Tiki. After his Zord denies him again, Magna Defender is attacked by the Freaky-Tiki, and finally explains to Leo about his plight, as well as that his brother is alive inside him, and the only way to save him is to destroy himself. Leo refuses and goes to help the Rangers fight Freak-Tikki. After being destroyed and growing, the Rangers call their zords and destroy him again. The volcano, however, is still ready to erupt, and the Rangers cannot reach it because of heat intensity. After hearing the voice of his son, the Magna Defender - realizing his past mistakes - sacrifices himself to save the colony and brings Mike back to the Rangers.
16	"Destined for Greatness"	Ryuta Tasaki	Judd Lynn	September 25, 1999	901
Leo's feeling down because he thinks Mike should have the Red Ranger powers as he pulled the Quasar Saber from the stone in the first place. Meanwhile, Skeletron captures four of the five Rangers in mirrors, leaving Mike and Leo to rescue them. After an ambush attack from one of Skeletron's subordinates, Mike reassures Leo that it was his destiny to be the Red Ranger, giving Leo the boost he needed. But after freeing his friends and using the Megazord to battle off a bigger Skeletron, the Rangers are helpless to defend themselves when the spirit of the original Magna Defender and Zika come back to Mike to give him his powers to become the new Magna Defender. With this new power, Mike combines with Torozord and defeats the Skeletron monster.
17	"Stolen Beauty"	Ryuta Tasaki	Judd Lynn	October 2, 1999	902
After hearing from her monster that she is not the prettiest girl in the world, Trakeena orders him to steal the beauty of all the beautiful women of Terra Venture. After she tries to trick Mike, he figures our what has been going on and destroys her monster, with the Ranger's help. Meanwhile, Trakeena has scurried home, but her father has told her it is time for her to go through her full metamorphosis. She refuses and runs away, making Scorpius angry.
18	"The Rescue Mission"	Steve Wang	Judd Lynn	October 9, 1999	903
A rescue team led by Mike follows a distress call to an abandoned spaceship. There, they find a spider monster who captures most of the crew. Mike and Leo free the team, and retrieve a mysterious book, just before the ship explodes.
19	"The Lost Galactabeasts"	Ryuta Tasaki	Judd Lynn	October 16, 1999	904
20	"The Lost Galactabeasts"	Ryuta Tasaki	Judd Lynn	October 22, 1999	905
Deviot appears uninvited on the Scorpion Stinger with a proposal, offering Scorpius the services of his powerful Zords in exchange for being his second in command and entering Trakeena's cocoon. Deviot travels to Terra Venture, captures Damon and Kai, and takes them to another planet, where they awaken wearing mind-controlling shackles. Once activated, they make the two fight each other, so that their energy can power Deviot's Zords. As the two Rangers battle, Damon gains control long enough to hurl his Quasar Saber at Deviot's machine, freeing him and Kai. However, Deviot - with the energy he has stolen from Kai and Damon - summons the Stratoforce and Centaurus Megazords to attack the Rangers. The rangers summon the Galactabeasts, but they refuse to fight them. Deviot later summons the Hardtochoke monster and gives him the remote control to his evil Zords to destroy Terra Venture. Maya tries to convince the Galactabeasts to fight the evil Zords to protect the people. Eventually, Kendrix finally decodes a page in the Galaxy Book, revealing that the evil Zords are the three lost Galactabeasts, so she takes off to warn the Rangers. As Leo charges the attacking Zords, Kendrix intervenes and tells him that they are Galactbeasts, and that is why their Galactabeasts will not fight them. The team confronts Deviot and Hardtochoke, who subsequently grows giant and strikes Torozord with a crippling blow. After the Rangers convince the zords they are not evil, Stratoforce and Centaurus are restored and kill Hardtochoke.
21	"Heir to the Throne"	Jonathan Tzachor	Judd Lynn	October 23, 1999	906
Trakeena escapes to the planet Onyx and is attacked by three patrons. She then meets Villamax and his friend Kegler, who saves and trains her. Meanwhile, Deviot sets Scorpius up to be killed by the Rangers. When Trakeena hears of this, she races back to the Scorpion Stinger to reconcile with her father before he passes. Afterwards, Trakeena assumes command.
22	"An Evil Game"	Koichi Sakamoto	Judd Lynn	October 25, 1999	907
Trakeena captures Leo to make him pay for killing her father. The two fight until Deviot's hitmen try to kill Trakeena. She turns the tables on the assassins, and Leo escapes while the villains are distracted.
23	"Memories of Mirinoi"	Jim Mathers	Judd Lynn	October 26, 1999	908
Maya's old friend, Shondra, appears on Terra Venture claiming to have avoided the petrification that Furio caused. Kendrix does not trust her, and her suspicions are proven accurate when Maya finds Shondra stealing the Galaxy Book. Shondra reveals herself to be Trakeena's monster, Rykon. The Rangers destroy her and retrieve the book.
24	"Green Courage"	Ryuta Tasaki	Jill Donnellan	October 27, 1999	909
Holding High Counselor Renier hostage, Trakeena demands that Terra Venture send her a mechanic to fix the Scorpion Stinger. Damon volunteers, and while he works on the engine, Leo sneaks in and frees the Counselor.
25	"Blue to the Test"	Ryuta Tasaki	Judd Lynn	October 28, 1999	910
Trakeena's monster Icy Angel takes control of Commander Stanton's mind, and has him set Terra Venture on a course towards a star. Only by disregarding the rules and following his instincts is Kai able to discover this plot, free Stanton, and save Terra Venture.
26	"Mean Wheels Mantis"	Worth Keeter	Judd Lynn	October 29, 1999	911
The motorcycle-riding Motor Mantis captures and changes Kendrix and Maya into gold trophies. The other Rangers must defeat him in a race to get them back, but the Astro Cycles are not fast enough. By communicating with the Lion Galactabeast, Leo transforms his cycle into the Red Capsular Cycle, defeating the Mantis, and saving Maya and Kendrix.
27	"Loyax' Last Battle"	Worth Keeter	Judd Lynn	November 1, 1999	912
An ancient hero turned villain named Loyax asks Trakeena to give him a final battle with a worthy opponent, and she sends him to Terra Venture to fight the Rangers. After Maya is injured, he ends up fighting only her, who convinces him to be good again, but Deviot uses a backup plan to destroy him.
28	"A Red Romance"	Koichi Sakamoto	Judd Lynn	November 2, 1999	913
Leo meets a girl named Ginger, who has an overprotective older brother. A monster appears and abducts Ginger, among others, and her brother tries to battle the beast himself. The Rangers destroy the monster and get back all of the victims.
29	"The Chameliac Warrior"	Ryuta Tasaki	Judd Lynn	November 3, 1999	914
Trakeena enlists the services of Chameliac, who can analyze and copy any maneuver and weapon he sees. He defeats the Rangers by using their moves against them, but they beat him by switching fighting styles.
30	"To the Tenth Power"	Ryuta Tasaki	Judd Lynn	November 4, 1999	915
Deviot brings back the Psycho Rangers, who abduct the Galaxy Rangers. When Leo faces off with Psycho Red, he proves to be too powerful until Leo meets Andros, the Red Space Ranger. The pair rescue the other Rangers and are introduced to the remaining Space Rangers. Together, they defeat the Psycho Rangers once more...except for one. Guest Starring: Tracy Lynn Cruz, Patricia Ja Lee, Christopher Khayman Lee, Roger Velasco, and Selwyn Ward.
31	"The Power of Pink"	Ryuta Tasaki	Judd Lynn	November 5, 1999	916
Psycho Pink survives the last battle, and reads Kendrix's mind. After escaping another fight with Cassie and Kendrix, she flees to Planet Rashon to find the Savage Sword. After drawing the sword, Psycho Pink damages Cassie's morpher, causing a pink energy storm that slowly depletes Cassie's life energy. Kendrix walks to the eye of the storm, and destroys the Savage Sword, but loses her life in the process. Guest Starring: Tracy Lynn Cruz, Patricia Ja Lee, Christopher Khayman Lee, Roger Velasco, and Selwyn Ward.
32	"Protect the Quasar Saber"	Jonathan Tzachor	Judd Lynn	November 8, 1999	917
The Pink Quasar Saber makes its way to Onyx where it is put up for auction. It is stolen by Karone, posing as Astronema. She narrowly escapes Trakeena's attack and makes it to the Rangers, who she ends up joining as the new Pink Ranger.
33	"Facing the Past"	Koichi Sakamoto	Judd Lynn	November 9, 1999	918
Karone and Leo travel to a planet to restore Leo's powers after the Magnetox monster steals them. A vision of Astronema makes Karone face her evil past. She overcomes her demons, and Leo's powers are restored by one of Astronema's victims. As a condition for restoring his powers, Leo is granted the keys to transform into the Red Armored Power Ranger.
34	"Turn Up the Volume"	Koichi Sakamoto	Jackie Marchand	November 10, 1999	919
Damon competes for the position of chief mechanic. He is beaten by Baxter, who steals his plans to win. Baxter and Damon must then team up to defeat the Decibat monster by using the machine Damon invented.
35	"Enter the Lost Galaxy"	Jonathan Tzachor	Judd Lynn	November 11, 1999	920
The Guardian arrives on Terra Venture, to get the Galaxy Book back. Deviot interferes, and the Guardian is killed, passing on the role of Guardian to Kai. Deviot receives the book and transports Terra Venture into the Lost Galaxy.
36	"Beware the Mutiny"	Ryuta Tasaki	Judd Lynn	November 12, 1999	921
Terra Venture is greeted in the Lost Galaxy by Captain Mutiny, who the Rangers discover runs a slave camp, and is looking to add the colony's citizens to his workforce. Mutiny unleashes the Grunchor monster on them, which burrows underground. Deviot is revealed to survive his fight against the Rangers and reverts to his original form as taking the power of Rocketron, one of Mutiny's monsters, destroying him.
37	"Grunchor on the Loose"	Ryuta Tasaki	Judd Lynn	November 15, 1999	922
The Rangers race to find Grunchor, which is causing massive earthquakes and destruction on Terra Venture. He surfaces at the command of Barbarax and attacks the Rangers, who destroy him with immense firepower channeled through the Megazords.
38	"Until Sunset"	Koichi Sakamoto	Judd Lynn	November 16, 1999	923
Leo and Damon are captured by Captain Mutiny and hung out to bake in the sun. As they roast, they remember their past adventures as Rangers. The others find them and set them free.
39	"Dream Battle"	Worth Keeter	Jill Donnellan	November 17, 1999	924
Mutiny's crewmember Hexuba casts a dream spell on the Rangers, making them fight battles in their mind as they sleep. Mike fights off the spell long enough to find Hexuba's hideout and break the spell while contending with the Nightmare Monster.
40	"Hexuba's Graveyard"	Worth Keeter	Judd Lynn & Denise Skinner	November 18, 1999	925
Hexuba resurrects past monsters as well as Treacheron and sends them to Terra Venture. The Rangers wear themselves out battling countless monsters, but Kai travels to the source, a graveyard, and puts an end to Hexuba's voodoo.
41	"Raise the Titanisaur"	Judd Lynn	Judd Lynn	November 19, 1999	926
Captain Mutiny decides to unleash his most fearsome monster against the Rangers - the Titanisaur. The Rangers and their Megazords must combine all of their powers and give it all they have got to defeat it.
42	"Escape the Lost Galaxy"	Judd Lynn	Judd Lynn	December 3, 1999	927
Barbarax captures several Terra Venture citizens to work in the slave camps, including Mike. Leo and Kai find a way to reopen the portal back to their universe, but Terra Venture cannot move fast enough to get through it. Mike frees the slaves and forces the portal open in Defender Torozord, sacrificing the zord and his powers in the process. Mike survives, and the original Magna Defender spirit comes to Mike to thank him for fulfilling his legacy. Meanwhile, Captain Mutiny, Barbarax, Deviot, and their crew escape from Lost Galaxy, but Trakeena, not wanting any rivals, destroys Mutiny's castle with her Scorpion Stinger, apparently killing them all.
43	"Journey's End"	Ryuta Tasaki	Judd Lynn	December 16, 1999	928
44	"Journey's End"	Ryuta Tasaki	Judd Lynn	December 17, 1999	929
45	"Journey's End"	Ryuta Tasaki	Judd Lynn	December 18, 1999	930
Part 1: Deviot survives and returns to the Scorpion Stinger, begging Trakeena to take him back. She is not falling for his charm this time and sics Villamax on him. The battle leads to the storage area, where Deviot grabs Trakeena and plunges into the cocoon, while Villamax helplessly watches. A single being emerges; Trakeena and Deviot have fused into one! It is mostly Trakeena, with a few shades of Deviot. With only one functional engine left, Commander Stanton decides the colony must land, showing high command and the citizens a new, nearby world he has discovered, perfect for human life. As Terra Venture prepares to land, it is attacked by the Scorpion Stinger, which blasts away at the lesser domes AND the last remaining engine. Leo and Damon lure the Scorpion Stinger into the connecting tubes to plant an explosive on it and hurling it off into space. With all engines destroyed, Terra Venture crashes on a moon, causing the central city dome to detach and destroying the rest of the colony. The citizens try to pick up the pieces from the crash. But they are not safe yet - the dome is cracking, and will not hold out much longer. Part 2: Commander Stanton decides to round up the citizens into the shuttles and evacuate Terra Venture. However, Trakeena prepares all the remaining Sting Wingers for a massive invasion by strapping them with suicide bombs and having them self-destruct and destroy anything they latch onto. The Stratoforce and Centaurus Megazords stand guard as the Sting Wingers approach the colony, but are overwhelmed and subsequently destroyed as the Rangers fight off the incoming Sting Wingers with everything they have got. Villamax watches in disgrace as Trakeena sends her remaining soldiers to their deaths to harm innocent people no less, when he saves a little girl from the wreckage of a demolished building. She gives him a flower, which moves the honorable warrior. Battered and beaten, the Rangers regroup after an exhausting triumph over the remaining Sting Wingers. Terra Venture has completed evacuation procedures, and several shuttles are carrying passengers to the new world. However, Trakeena orders Villamax to open fire on the shuttles, but he refuses, saying there is no honor in such a brutal and pointless assault. Enraged with his insubordination, she ruthlessly kills him. Kegler hardly has a chance to mourn and is threatened back into service. Villamax's sacrifice gave the Rangers enough time to bring around the Astro Megaship and open fire on the Scorpion Stinger. However, the Stinger rams the Astro Megaship and grabs it in its pinchers, causing severe damage. The Rangers have no choice but to self-destruct the Megaship and escape in the Jet Jammers. The Rangers barely clear the explosion, but it sends Alpha 6 and Leo hurling into space. The explosion sends the Stinger and Leo reeling, and both of them crash-land on the moon, near the city dome. The shuttles have safely made it to the new world, and the passengers rejoice. The Rangers land on the new world and find Alpha unharmed, and Leo missing. From the Moon, Leo tries to radio his teammates, but without the Megaship, all communications are severed. Part 3: Trakeena staggers around the wreckage of the Scorpion Stinger. She makes it to the storage chamber and prepares to enter the cocoon again, emerging as a slimy insectoid in the process. Down on the new world, the Rangers continue searching for Leo, who finds the Scorpion Stinger and follows Trakeena's slime trail to the command room, where Trakeena spikes her staff into the ground, energizing and powering up the city dome. The city dome lifts off and heads for the new world to destroy the people's camp. Trakeena confronts Leo and the two battle, but Leo is no match against her new powers. When the Rangers find out that Leo is in the city dome, they fly there on the Jammers and help him, but are overpowered. Eventually, Leo transforms into Red Armored Power Ranger and grabs Trakeena with a claw. He pulls her in close and fires at point-blank range. The Rangers think Leo has been killed in the explosion as well, but Leo crawls out of the wreckage. The city dome is still headed for the camp, and the Rangers have no idea how to stop it when the Galaxy Megazord appears, and attempts to steer the city dome away from the camp. It crashes in the distance and explodes. Just as the people begin to think that the Rangers are dead, they emerge with the Galactabeasts, alive and well. As the Rangers head towards camp, the people run towards them and congratulate their saviors. The Galactabeasts call the Rangers into the forest, where Maya makes a surprising discovery - they have landed on Mirinoi! With their quest completed, the Rangers find the stone and they place the Quasar Sabers back in it. The energy from the Sabers restores the petrified people of Mirinoi and brought Kendrix back. She thanks Karone for filling in for her. Everyone celebrates under the fireworks, including the Galactabeasts: a new world, a new beginning.

== Home media ==
In 2012, Shout! Factory announced that it had reached an exclusive distribution deal with Saban Brands for shows such as Power Rangers and Big Bad Beetleborgs. Power Rangers Lost Galaxy was released on DVD in August as part of a Time-Life exclusive boxed set containing seasons 1-7 of Power Rangers. The season later became available separately from the boxed set on March 10, 2015.
