= List of Power Rangers Lightspeed Rescue characters =

Power Rangers Lightspeed Rescue (2000) is the eighth season of the Power Rangers franchise which sees a group of civil servants being recruited by the U.S. government to fight an army of demons.

== Main characters ==
=== Lightspeed Power Rangers ===
The Lightspeed Rangers

The Lightspeed Rangers are civil servants from the fictional city of Mariner Bay who were recruited by the U.S. government under "Operation Lightspeed" to utilize advanced technology to combat demons.

==== Carter Grayson ====
Carter Grayson is a serious and devoted yet devil-may-care firefighter who was chosen to serve as the Red Lightspeed Ranger. He was recruited by Dana and the men in black Captain Mitchell sent with her after saving a child from a burning building, during which he had a brief glimpse of the demon Ghouligan.

Carter Grayson is portrayed by Sean CW Johnson.

==== Chad Lee ====
Chad Lee is a martial artist, lifeguard, and marine theme park performer who was chosen to serve as the Blue Lightspeed Ranger. He was recruited by the men in black sent by Captain Mitchell after he performed at a marine park with a killer whale.

Chad Lee is portrayed by Michael Chaturantabut.

==== Joel Rawlings ====
Joel Rawlings is a stunt pilot who was chosen to serve as the Green Lightspeed Ranger. He was recruited by the men in black sent by Captain Mitchell after his latest stunt pilot performance. Throughout the series, he develops a romantic interest in Operation Lightspeed scientist Angela Fairweather.

Joel Rawlings is portrayed by Keith Robinson.

==== Kelsey Winslow ====
Kelsey Winslow is a free-spirited and quick-witted yet impulsive and hot-headed extreme sports enthusiast who was chosen to serve as the Yellow Lightspeed Ranger. After climbing the side of a cliff, Kelsey was recruited by the men in black sent by Captain Mitchell.

Kelsey Winslow is portrayed by Sasha Williams.

==== Dana Mitchell ====
Dana Leigh Mitchell is the stoic, compassionate, intellectual, and level-headed yet impatient and blunt daughter of Captain Mitchell, younger sister of Ryan Mitchell, and an Operation Lightspeed medic who was chosen to serve as the Pink Lightspeed Ranger. While assisting her father's men in black in gathering the recruits, Dana attends to a girl who Carter rescued from a burning building before personally recruiting him. With the recruits gathered, Dana is added to the Lightspeed Rangers group by her father.

Dana Mitchell is portrayed by Alison MacInnis.

==== Ryan Mitchell ====
Ryan Mitchell is Captain Mitchell's son and Dana Mitchell's older brother who serves as the silver-colored Titanium Ranger. As a child, the Mitchells were involved in an accident wherein Ryan was almost killed before he was saved by a demon called Diabolico, who held him prisoner until his 20th birthday. Under the demon's orders, Ryan steals the Titanium Morpher from Operation Lightspeed and attempts to kill the Lightspeed Rangers. After being defeated by them, Ryan eventually betrays Diabolico and defects to the Rangers. The demon inflicts a cursed cobra tattoo on Ryan that threatens to move up his body until it kills him every time he uses his Ranger powers. Ryan temporarily leaves Mariner Bay to kill the remaining demons and the Cobra Demon associated with the curse.

Ryan Mitchell is portrayed by Rhett Fisher.

== Recurring characters ==
=== Captain William Mitchell ===
Captain William Mitchell is the captain of "Operation Lightspeed", a former firefighter, and the father of Dana and Ryan Mitchell.

Captain Mitchell is portrayed by Ron Roggé.

=== Angela Fairweather ===
Angela Fairweather is an "Operation Lightspeed" scientist and technician. She would later become the love interest of Joel Rawlings.

Angela Fairweather is portrayed by Monica Louwerens.

=== Demons ===
The demons are monsters who sought to conquer Earth five millennia prior to the series, only to be sealed by a powerful warlock. In the present, a group of nomads accidentally free them. Upon learning the city of Mariner Bay was built over their former castle, they work to destroy it and revive their leader Queen Bansheera to seek revenge on humanity, only to face opposition from the Lightspeed Rangers.

==== Diabolico ====
Diabolico is a powerful sylph/devil-themed demon and acting leader of Queen Bansheera's forces amidst her absence who possesses the "Star Power". Throughout the series, he mounts several failed attempts to kill the Lightspeed Rangers, destroy Mariner Bay, and rebuild Bansheera's empire, which eventually culminate in his death and Bansheera giving the Star Power to her son, Prince Olympius. Due to Olympius' failures however, Vypra and Loki resurrect Diabolico, who traps Olympius in the Shadow World before working to regain Bansheera's favor until she absorbs Vypra and sends Loki to his death. In response, Diabolico attempts to use Carter Grayson to kill Bansheera, but is captured by Olympius, brainwashed by the demoness, and forced to serve her son. While fighting the Rangers, Carter frees Diabolico from her control, but Olympius kills him before the Rangers kill the prince in turn. Subsequently, Bansheera resurrects Diabolico and Olympius as super demons to weaken the Rangers, who narrowly kill them once more. Following this, Diabolico's spirit returns to aid Carter in defeating Bansheera.

Diabolico is voiced by Neil Kaplan.

==== Vypra ====
Vypra is a demoness, sorceress, and friend of Diabolico and Loki who wears a snake/dragon-themed outfit. Throughout the series, she cares for Impus before growing disdainful towards him after he evolves into Olympius, contributes to Diabolico's resurrection in light of Olympius' failures, and battles the Lightspeed Rangers until Queen Bansheera absorbs her to complete her resurrection.

Vypra is primarily portrayed by Jennifer L. Yen and by Wen Yann Shih in episodes two and three.

==== Loki ====
Loki (pronounced "Low-kai") is a fierce and loyal kobold-themed demon warrior, friend of Diabolico and Vypra, and the strongest of Bansheera's generals. Throughout the series, he battles the Lightspeed Rangers and contributes to Diabolico's resurrection in light of Prince Olympius' failures until Bansheera sends Loki to his death in a failed attempt at killing the Rangers.

Loki is voiced by David Lodge.

==== Jinxer ====
Jinxer is a housefly-themed demon butler/magician who provides aid to the other demons with his spells.

Jinxer is voiced by Kim Strauss while Benton Jennings portrays his "Mr. Mesmer" disguise. He and a small faction of Batlings piloted the newly repaired Omega Megazord to place the circle of stones around Mariner Bay to assist Queen Bansheera's ceremony in opening the gateway into the Shadow World and releasing all of the demons from within into the world. After placing the final stone, Carter and Ryan eventually rammed the Mobile Armor Vehicle into it, destroying it. Though not shown on screen, it is assumed that Jinxer and the faction of Batlings were destroyed as well.

==== Impus / Prince Olympius ====
Impus, later known as Prince Olympius, is the salamander/European dragon-themed son of Queen Bansheera and a demon prince. Initially starting the series in an infant form, he later receives Diabolico's Star Power from Bansheera, evolves into his adult form, and temporarily takes command of the demons. Despite his newfound power and developing a rivalry with Carter Grayson, Olympius proves less adept than Diabolico and loses his position to Loki.

Following Bansheera's resurrection, Olympius mounts failed attempts at winning her affection and eliminating Vypra and Loki before they can usurp him as her second-in-command. However, the pair resurrect Diabolico, who banishes Olympius to the Shadow World. There, he battles its inhabitants to absorb their power and evolve into a more powerful form while Jinxer uses the Rangers' technology to empower him further. Upon escaping the Shadow World, Olympius wreaks havoc on Mariner Bay until Angela Fairweather severs his connection to the technology, allowing the Rangers to defeat him and destroy the Star Power. Nonetheless, Jinxer nurses Olympius back to health.

In time, Olympius returns to capture Diabolico before having Bansheera brainwash him. The pair subsequently attack the Rangers, but Diabolico breaks free and rebels against Olympius, who kills him before the Rangers kill Olympius in turn. Amidst her final battle with the Rangers, Bansheera resurrects Olympius and Diabolico as "super demons", but they are killed once more by the Rangers.

Impus is voiced by Brianne Siddall while Olympius is voiced by Michael Forest.

==== Queen Bansheera ====
Queen Bansheera is a demoness monarch who was initially absent following the demons' release before eventually joining them in a spiritual energy form. Once he attains his adult form, her son, Prince Olympius, and a demon wizard named Spellbinder enact a ceremony to restore her physical form, but the Lightspeed Rangers disrupt their efforts, leading to Bansheera being trapped in a rudimentary, cocoon-like form.

As the Rangers continue to thwart her forces, she absorbs the demoness Vypra to complete her resurrection into a demonic angel/vampire/witch-themed form. Bansheera forces Diabolico to kill Loki, transforms Diabolico and Olympius into super demons, and sacrifices them to weaken the Rangers before attempting to open a portal to the Shadow World and free its inhabitants. However, Carter Grayson and Diabolico's spirit push her in, whereupon she is attacked by the Shadow World's demons.

Queen Bansheera is voiced by Diane Salinger.

==== Batlings ====
The Batlings are the imp/bat-like foot soldiers of Queen Bansheera's group.

==== Minor demons ====
These minor demons are summoned by Queen Bansheera's followers. Jinxer casts a spell to make the defeated demon grow. Other times, he would throw an Advanced Growth Card on their remains to restore them into their advanced form.

- Ghouligan: A fire demon. He is summoned by Diabolico to destroy Mariner Bay. Carter caught a glimpse of Ghouligan when rescuing a girl from a burning building. Ghouligan was killed by the Lightspeed Rangers. Ghouligan is voiced by Ken Merckx.
- Magmavore: A giant lava golem. Jinxer summons him to destroy Mariner Bay, only for Magmavore to be destroyed by the Lightspeed Rangers. Sometime later, Queen Bansheera resurrects and strengthens Magmavore, but the latter is destroyed by the Rangers once more. Magmavore is voiced by Kim Strauss in his first appearance and David Lodge in his second appearance.
- Quakemon: A antlion-themed Earth demon who can cause earthquakes. Loki and Jinxer summon him to fight the Lightspeed Rangers, who eventually kill Quakemon. Quakemon is voiced by David Lodge.
- Whirlin: An aerokinetic bat-themed sky demon. Diabolico summons him to fight the Lightspeed Rangers, who eventually kill Whirlin. Whirlin is voiced by John C. Hyke.
- Fireor: A gargoyle/crab-themed fire demon. Impus summons him to fight the Lightspeed Rangers, who eventually kill Fireor. Fireor is voiced by Bob Papenbrook.
- Elestomp: An elephant-themed demon possesses superhuman strength. Loki summons him to fight the Lightspeed Rangers, who eventually kill Elestomp. Elestomp is voiced by Stephen Apostolina.
- Strikning: A lightning/skeleton-themed demon who can fire spikes from his body and use them as lightning rods. After being summoned by Diabolico to destroy Mariner Bay, Strikning overpowers the Cyborg Rangers before he is killed by the Lightspeed Rangers. Strikning is voiced by Eddie Frierson.
- Smogger: A gas-emitting slug-themed demon who possesses explosive orbs. Vypra summons him to destroy Mariner Bay before he is killed by Carter Grayson. Smogger is voiced by Richard Steven Horvitz.
- Trifire: A three-headed dragon-themed fire demon. Impus summons him to make Mount Jasmine erupt, only for Trifire to be killed by the Lightspeed Rangers. Following this, Queen Bansheera resurrects and strengthens Trifire into his advanced form, only for him to be killed by the Rangers once more. Trifire is voiced by Dave Mallow.
- Liztwin: A skeletal dinosaur/dragon-themed demon with a dragon-like head for a right hand. Vypra summons him to fight the Lightspeed Rangers. Liztwin was later transformed into his advanced form, with a claw arm replacing the head arm and sporting long horns and wings. The Lightspeed Rangers eventually kill him. Liztwin is voiced by Archie Kao.
- Demonite: A knight-themed demon and one of Diabolico's strongest servants. Demonite is summoned to kill the Lightspeed Rangers and Ryan Mitchell, only to be killed by Carter Grayson. Demonite is voiced by David Stenstrom.
- Thunderon: A Viking/ghoul-themed demon and one of Diabolico's strongest servants. Thunderon is summoned to kill the Lightspeed Rangers and Ryan Mitchell. Thunderon was later assisted by Falkar's advanced form as both of them are destroyed by the Lightspeed Rangers. Thunderon is voiced by Alonzo Bodden.
- Falkar: A elf/falcon-themed demon and one of Diabolico's strongest servants. Falkar is summoned to kill the Lightspeed Rangers and Ryan Mitchell. Diabolico later threw an Advanced Growth Card into Falkar, causing him to grow into a dragon-like advanced form. He alongside Thunderon were killed by the Lightspeed Rangers. Falkar is voiced by Ezra Weisz.
- Troika: A three-faced Chimera-themed demon that Diabolico created from Demonite, Thunderon, and Falkar's gems to kill the Lightspeed Rangers. Troika sports the faces of the three demons as well as Demonite's right sword arm, Thunderon's left arm, and Falkar's feathered legs. He was destroyed by the Lightspeed Rangers. Troika is voiced simultaneously by David Stenstrom, Alonzo Bodden, and Ezra Weisz.
- Cobra Demon: A cobra-themed demon that was associated with the Cobra Tattoo that Diabolico placed on Ryan. Once it was killed by Ryan, the cobra tattoo vanished. The Cobra Demon is voiced by Richard Cansino.
- Thunderclaw: A stag beetle-themed demon who can generate electricity from his horns. Jinxer summons him to assist Vypra in a failed attempt at infiltrating the Lightspeed Aquabase before he is killed by the Lightspeed Rangers. Thunderclaw is voiced by Bob Papenbrook.
- Shockatron: An electricity-powered devil/cyborg-themed demon. Loki and Vypra summon him to destroy Mariner Bay's power plants until he is killed by the Lightspeed Rangers. Shockatron is voiced by Herbie Baez.
- Spellbinder: A Kannushi/squid-themed demon who Olympius summoned to help him revive Queen Bansheera until he is killed by the Lightspeed Rangers. Spellbinder is voiced by Kirk Thornton.
- Moleman: A mole-themed demon. Vypra summons him to help her construct a laser to destroy Mariner Bay until he is thwarted and killed by the Lightspeed Rangers. Moleman is voiced by Ken Merckx.
- Cyclopter: A cyclops/wrestler-themed demon. After being summoned by Loki, he receives training from martial arts instructor Mr. Tamashiro, but is killed by the Lightspeed Rangers. Cyclopter is voiced by Richard Epcar.
- Mantevil: A mantis-themed demon. He accompanies Olympius in attacking Mariner Bay until Mantevil is killed by the Lightspeed Rangers. Mantevil is voiced by Michael McConnohie.
- Vilevine: A Rafflesia/ivy-themed demon. Olympius summons him to help him kill Vypra and Loki before they can steal his position as Bansheera's second-in-command, only for Vilevine to be killed by the Lightspeed Rangers. Vilevine is voiced by Kim Strauss.
- Freezard: A cobra-themed ice demon who possesses cryokinesis and the ability to pull opponents into his frigid stomach. Olympius summons him to kill the Lightspeed Rangers, who eventually kill Freezard. Freezard is voiced by Steve McGowan.
- Infinitor: A dragon/lizard-themed demon warrior. Olympius summons him to fight the Lightspeed Rangers, who eventually kill Infinitor. Infinitor is voiced by Paul Schrier.
- Birdbane: A crow-themed demon and the self-proclaimed "King of Winged Demon Creatures". Jinxer summons him to reclaim a "monster egg" for Olympius. Birdbane was later revived in a knight-helmeted advanced form only for Birdbane to be killed by the Lightspeed Rangers. Birdbane is voiced by Michael Sorich.
- Triskull: A devil-themed demon warrior who betrayed Queen Bansheera to align himself with an alien called Trakeena. He was killed by Carter Grayson and Leo Corbett. Triskull is voiced by Michael Sorich.
  - Ghouls: The Grim Reaper-themed foot soldiers of Triskull.
- Memorase: A killer whale-themed demon capable of erasing memories. Diabolico summons him to fight the Lightspeed Rangers, who eventually kill Memorase. Memorase is voiced by Marc Caldera.
- Gatekeeper: The sorcerer-themed guardian of the "Shadow World" who can summon and control the spirits of dead demons with his staff. Gatekeeper is voiced by Michael Sorich.
- Aquafiend: A kappa-themed water demon. Diabolico summons him to steal Neptune's trident and use it to drain Mariner Bay's water before Aquafiend is killed by the Lightspeed Rangers. Aquafiend is voiced by Peter Greenwood.
- Arachnor: A spider-themed demon who is killed by Carter Grayson. Arachnor is voiced by Catherine Battistone.
- Treevil: A tree-themed demon who possesses explosive acorns and superhuman strength. Jinxer creates him to fight the Lightspeed Rangers, who eventually kill Treevil. Treevil is voiced by John C. Hyke.
- Abominus: A jellyfish-themed demon who was named in the video game adaption.

== Guest characters ==
- Nancy Cooper: An astronaut and friend of Kelsey Winslow. Nancy Cooper is portrayed by Rachel Koda.
- Earl: An old friend of Captain Mitchell's. Earl is portrayed by Hal England.
- General McKnight: Captain Mitchell's superior who approves the creation of the Cyborg Rangers to replace the Lightspeed Rangers. McKnight is portrayed by Bert Kramer.
- Simon: Joel Rawlings' cousin and a prodigy. Simon is portrayed by Jonathan Robinson.
- Grandmother Winslow: Kelsey Winslow's estranged, affluent paternal grandmother and a retired athlete. Grandmother Winslow is portrayed by Shannon Welles.
- Mr. Tamashiro: A martial arts instructor and Chad Lee's former mentor who disagrees with his work as a Ranger and trained a monster called Cyclopter in the hopes of having him become his best student. Mr. Tamashiro is portrayed by Koji Kataoka.
- Clark Fairweather: Angela Fairweather's brother who develops new technology for the Lightspeed Rangers' use. Clark Fairweather is portrayed by Jeff Henry.
- Marina: A mermaid and the daughter of Neptune. Marina is portrayed by Kamera Walton.
- Heather: A young girl whose parents were taken by Triskull and aids in the Lightspeed and Galaxy Rangers' efforts to defeat Trakeena. Heather is portrayed by Chelsea Russo.
- Trakeena: An insectoid alien and daughter of Scorpius who previously fought the Galaxy Rangers until she was seemingly killed by Leo Corbett. Having survived the battle, she travels to Earth to seek revenge on the Galaxy Rangers. Forming an alliance with a demon warrior named Triskull, she captures several of Mariner Bay's citizens to drain their lifeforces. However, the Galaxy and Lightspeed Rangers join forces to rescue her captives while Olympius poisons Trakeena, causing her to mutate into a monstrous demonic form with tentacles for legs. Nonetheless, the two Ranger teams successfully kill her. Trakeena is portrayed by Jennifer Burns.
- Galaxy Rangers: A group of inhabitants of the space colony Terra Venture, later the alien planet Mirinoi, who previously fought aliens such as Scorpius and Trakeena. Upon learning of the latter's return, they travel to Earth and join forces with the Lightspeed Rangers to thwart and kill her.
  - Leo Corbett: A stowaway who became the Red Galaxy Ranger. Leo Corbett is portrayed by Danny Slavin.
  - Damon Henderson: A mechanic who became the Green Galaxy Ranger. Damon Henderson is portrayed by Reggie Rolle.
  - Kai Chen: A military officer who became the Blue Galaxy Ranger. Kai Chen is portrayed by Archie Kao.
  - Maya: A native inhabitant of Mirinoi who became the Yellow Galaxy Ranger. Maya is portrayed by Cerina Vincent.
  - Kendrix Morgan: A science officer who became the Pink Galaxy Ranger. Kendrix Morgan is portrayed by Valerie Vernon.
- Sorcerer of the Sands: A powerful warlock who sealed the demons five millennia prior. The Sorcerer of the Sands is portrayed by Gilbert Amelio.
- Neptune: The god of the sea from Roman mythology, ruler of Atlantis, and Marina's father. Neptune is portrayed by Harry Frazier.
- Koko Kashmere: A fashion designer who scouts Dana Mitchell to become a model. Koko Kashmere is portrayed by Ruta Lee.
