= Kim Strauss =

American voice actor

- Other name: Kurt Strauss
- Occupations: Voice actor; author
- Years active: 1986–present
- Children: 3

Kim Strauss is an American voice actor and best-selling author with his children's books Kalan the Mighty Warrior: Book One and Braxus the Owl: Guardian of the Forest. He was the voice of Ninjor in Mighty Morphin Power Rangers.

== History ==
He is also known for doing many voice roles throughout the history of the Power Rangers franchise prior to Power Rangers Ninja Storm; the more notable roles include Ninjor in Season 3 of Mighty Morphin Power Rangers, Scorpius in Power Rangers: Lost Galaxy, and Jinxer in Power Rangers: Lightspeed Rescue. He has also enjoyed recurring acting roles on popular television series such as The Young and the Restless and Babylon 5.

His first appearance in Power Rangers franchise prior to becoming its known voice actor was physically portraying a minor character, Harvey Garvey in Season 2 of Mighty Morphin Power Rangers, whose fate in Mighty Morphin Power Rangers: Once & Always is revealed to have died in 2022, a year prior to the event of said Netflix's special movie.

== Filmography ==
=== Anime ===
- Bleach Since 2004 – Sajin Komamura (until Ep. 99), Kaien Shiba, Tatsufusa Enjōji, Oscar Joaquin de la Rosa, Jūshirō Ukitake (Ep. 40)
- Blue Dragon – General Szabo
- The Big O – R. Frederick O'Reilly
- Cagaster of an Insect Cage – Mario
- Dinozaurs – Dino Tyranno
- Eureka Seven – Dewey Novak
- Fafner in the Azure – Tomatsu Kōdate
- Flint the Time Detective – The Old Timer, Elfin
- Ghost in the Shell: Stand Alone Complex – Gayle (Eps. 20–21)
- Grenadier - The Senshi of Smiles – Jester Kaizan Doushi
- Immortal Grand Prix – Sir Hamgra
- Japan Sinks: 2020 – Saburō Ōtani
- Karas – Nurse
- Mars Daybreak – Grandpa
- Naruto – Ibiki Morino
- Overman King Gainer – Ariel
- Rurouni Kenshin – Tsukioka Tsunan
- Samurai Champloo – Mukuro
- Scrapped Princess – Lenard
- Tenchi Muyo! GXP – Tarant Shank
- Tenchi Muyo! Ryo-Ohki – Sorunāru, Additional Voices
- Tenjou Tenge – Mitsuomi Takayanagi
- Transformers: Robots in Disguise – Ultra Magnus
- Mirage of Blaze – Masamune Date
- The Twelve Kingdoms – Keiki

=== Western animation ===
- The Casagrandes – Trailer Narrator, Voice Over, Food Critic (in "Guess Who's Shopping for Dinner?")

=== Video games ===
- Blue Dragon – Silent Ku, Guru-Guru, Pachess Townperson
- Doom Eternal – UAC Cultist, Battlemode Announcer
- Ghost in the Shell: Stand Alone Complex – Eichi Gotoh
- Grand Theft Auto V – The Local Population
- Naruto: Ultimate Ninja – Tazuna

=== Live-action ===
- Adventures in Voice Acting – Himself
- Babylon 5 – Additional Roles
- ER – Ari
- Masked Rider – Water Bug (voice), Masked Rider Warrior Leader (voice)
- Mighty Morphin Power Rangers – Harvey Garvey, Ninjor (voice; credited as Kurt Strauss)
- Power Rangers Zeo - Auric the Conqueror (uncredited)
- Million Dollar Baby - Irish Fan #3
- Power Rangers Wild Force – Lawnmower Org (voice), Rofang (voice)
- Power Rangers Time Force – Tronicon (voice), Venomark (voice)
- Power Rangers Lightspeed Rescue – Jinxer (voice), Magmavore (1st voice), Vilevine (voice)
- Power Rangers Lost Galaxy – Scorpius (voice), Teksa (1st voice), Decibat (voice)
- Power Rangers in Space – Clawhammer, Barillian Bug Monster (voice, uncredited)
- The Young and the Restless – Dr. Reese Walker
