= Bodied =

2017 film directed by Joseph Kahn

- Theatrical release poster
- Directed by: Joseph Kahn
- Screenplay by: Alex Larsen
- Story by: Joseph Kahn; Alex Larsen
- Produced by: Eminem; Paul Rosenberg; Adi Shankar; Jil Hardin
- Starring: Calum Worthy; Jackie Long; Rory Uphold; Dumbfoundead; Walter Perez; Shoniqua Shandai; Charlamagne tha God; Dizaster; Hollow da Don; Loaded Lux; Debra Wilson; Anthony Michael Hall
- Cinematography: Matt Wise
- Edited by: Chancler Haynes
- Music by: Brain & Melissa
- Production company: Shady Films
- Distributed by: YouTube Premium; Neon
- Release dates: September 7, 2017 (TIFF); November 2, 2018 (United States); November 28, 2018 (YouTube Premium)
- Running time: 121 minutes
- Countries: United States; Canada
- Language: English
- Budget: $1 million
- Box office: $113,956

Bodied is a 2017 American battle rap comedy-drama film directed by Joseph Kahn, written by Alex Larsen and produced by Eminem, his manager Paul Rosenberg, and Adi Shankar. The film premiered at the 2017 Toronto International Film Festival. It stars Calum Worthy as Adam, a graduate student who becomes a competitive battle rapper after becoming immersed in the scene while working on his graduate thesis on the subject.

At the Toronto International Film Festival, the film won the Toronto International Film Festival People's Choice Award: Midnight Madness. It also won Fantastic Fest's 2017 Audience Award. In January 2018, YouTube Red announced it had acquired exclusive streaming rights, with a limited theatrical release beginning on November 2, 2018.

Upon the film's release, it received generally positive reviews from critics who praised its humour and meaningful exploration of certain dark themes.

== Plot ==
Adam Merkin, a white graduate student at Berkeley, is writing a thesis on the use of the word "nigga" in battle rap. To research, he attends a rap battle between rappers X-Tract and Behn Grym and brings his girlfriend Maya along; Maya is offended by the sexism she perceives in the bars used in the battle. Adam attempts to interview Grym and is made fun of for his rhetoric. In the parking lot outside the event, Grym is called out by young white rapper Billy Pistolz, but Adam steps in and delivers a freestyle verse accusing Pistolz of cultural appropriation. Impressed, Grym agrees to speak with Adam further.

Adam's father, Professor Merkin, is a best-selling author and professor at Berkeley. When Adam runs the idea of his thesis by his father, he is mocked again. Adam accepts an offer by battle promoter Donnie Narco for a battle for newcomers against Korean rapper Prospek. At the battle, Adam attempts to perform joke lines but does not get the reaction he hoped for; he falls back on Asian jokes, winning over the crowd and taking the battle. Adam also meets rappers Che Corleone, Devine Wright, and Megaton, who is known for his aggressive persona.

At a vegan restaurant, Adam attempts to convince Maya that it is okay for him to keep battling but insults both her and a waitress in rhyme, angering her and getting himself ejected from the restaurant. Maya later leaves Adam after his rapper friends offend her. After an event where Adam, Che, Devine, and Grym all win their battles, they attend a house party hosted by Megaton where Che has sex with Megaton's girlfriend, porn star Bella Backwoods. Enraged, Megaton challenges Che to an eventual battle.

Adam tries to stay with Grym, who besides being a rapper, is professionally a video game designer with a wife and a child with cystic fibrosis. Grym maintains his privacy because he does not want people to use personal insults against him and, as such, never uses personal insults himself. Grym offers Adam to stay at his house, but his wife accuses Adam of appropriating black culture and refuses to let him stay.

Adam is contacted by another promoter, offering him the chance to battle Grym for $5,000 at the same event as Megaton and Che's battle. However, Adam turns it down, stating that battle rap has ruined his life. Maya then uses an online video of Adam's battle with Prospek as supporting material for her own thesis, turning the student body of Berkeley against him. His father also disowns him, and the dean of the school suspends his scholarship. Left with no other choice, Adam calls the promoter and accepts the battle.

At the event, Adam and Grym battle. Grym delivers scathing but fictional bars against Adam, who betrays him to win by using Grym's actual personal details, with emphasis on his daughter's illness. Adam then gets angry at two other rappers who are talking during his round, and he and Grym perform an impromptu two on two battle against them.

Afterwards, Grym informs Adam that they are no longer friends, because while other battle rappers' cruelty is merely an act, Adam's battle rapping has become an outlet for his actual cruelty. Grym departs, saying he needs to be where he belongs; with his family. Desperate, Adam attempts to call Maya and ask her to marry him. She lashes out at the ridiculousness of the idea and tells him to stay away from her.

Megaton "bodies" Che during their battle, even bringing his girlfriend out to rap about how bad he is at sex. Afterwards, Megaton starts insulting the crowd, daring anyone to challenge him. Adam, left with nothing else, steps into the ring and takes on Megaton, who eventually hits him in the face and knocks out a tooth during his verse. Unfazed, the bloodied Adam gets back on his feet and calls Megaton out for putting on an aggressive act. Megaton concedes the battle to a triumphant Adam. After sleeping on a park bench on the Berkeley campus, Adam watches a video of his new widespread fame on his phone and decides what his rap name is.

== Cast ==
- Calum Worthy as Adam Merkin, a progressive graduate student who develops a passion for battle rapping while researching the scene for his thesis paper
- Jackie Long as Behn Grym, a veteran battle rapper, and Adam's mentor in navigating the world of battle rapping
- Rory Uphold as Maya, Adam's girlfriend
- Dumbfoundead as Prospek, a battle rapper
- Walter Perez as Che Corleone
- Shoniqua Shandai as Devine Wright
- Charlamagne tha God as Hunnid Gramz, a battle rap promoter
- Dizaster as Megaton, a battle rapper
- Loaded Lux as Bluntz
- Hollow da Don as 40 MAG
- Debra Wilson as Dean Hampton
- Anthony Michael Hall as Professor Merkin, Adam's father
- Daniel Rashid as MC Goggles
- Simon Rex as Donnie Narco, a battle rap promoter
- Corey Charron as Billy Pistolz
- Terrance "Big T" Greenlee as X-Tract
- Davone "Daylyt" Campbell as Big Zee
- Adam Ferrone (Rone) as Groom
- Pat Stay as Racist Battler
- Adi Shankar as Campus Security Guard With Turban
- Andy Milonakis as Freddie Hustle
- Faithe Herman as Grace

The film also includes cameo appearances by real-life battle rap personalities Illmaculate, Nocando, Philly Swain, Iron Solomon, Ultimate Rap League founder Troy "Smack White" Mitchell, and King of the Dot founder Organik.

== Reception ==
On review aggregator Rotten Tomatoes, the film holds an approval rating of 89% based on 82 reviews, with an average rating of 7.4/10. The website's critical consensus states: "With its thorny themes and aggressive humor, Bodied dares to offend - and justifies its approach with a subversive comedy that edifies as it entertains." On Metacritic, the film has a weighted average score of 75 out of 100, based on 22 critics, indicating "generally favorable" reviews.

Brian Tallerico, writing for RogerEbert.com, said that the film "offers an entertaining window into a culture that most people probably know very little about, but it's also a clever take on a generation more aware of what's offensive and what's not than any before". Barry Hertz of The Globe and Mail called the film "an outrageous and outrageously entertaining treatise on cultural sensitivity".

=== Home media ===
Bodied was released for DVD and Blu-ray on September 17, 2019, through Gravitas Ventures.

== See also ==
- List of hood films
