= Corey Charron =

Canadian battle rapper and hip hop artist

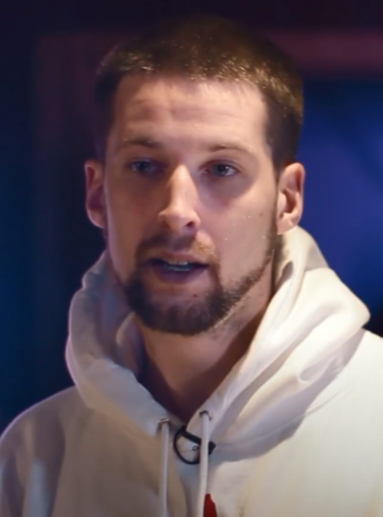
- Charron in 2017

Background information
- Born: Corey Charron; 1991 (age 34–35); Ottawa, Ontario, Canada
- Genre: Hip hop
- Occupation: Battle rapper

Corey Charron, better known mononymously as Charron (born 1991), is a Canadian battle rapper and hip hop artist from Ottawa, Canada.

== Early life and education ==
Corey Charron was born in 1991 in Orleans, Ontario. He graduated from St. Peter Catholic High School and enrolled in pre-music production at Algonquin College before dropping out to compete in a battle rap contest.

== Career ==
Charron started competing in freestyle contests across the country in 2009. He made his battle rap debut at 17 years old in the Canadian-based rap battle league, King of the Dot (KOTD). He also made appearances in URL and Grind Time Now, as well as FlipTop Battle League and the UK battle league Don't Flop. He has competed in over 100+ battles which include the likes of DNA, Pat Stay, Shotgun Suge, Arsonal, and Hollow Da Don.

In 2011, Charron was named the winner of the AUX TV reality show series "Ultimate MC."

Throughout February 2013, Charron served as an opening act for Wu-Block's 13-show Canadian tour alongside Ghostface Killah and Sheek Louch.

A 21-year-old Charron appeared on BET's 106 & Park Freestyle Friday series co-hosted by Bow Wow in March 2013. Before being chosen, he had applied to the show for years, but only Americans were featured until a 2012 Twitter campaign pushed for a Canadian participant. While competing in the tournament, the Orleans battle rapper invested weeks of travel and approximately $3,000 journeying back and forth between Ottawa and New York City. After winning the Freestyle Friday March Mayhem Tournament and its $5,000 prize, Charron was denied his promised appearance in the 2013 BET Hip Hop Awards cypher, which had already been taped without him. Omar Grant, director of Music Matters at BET Networks, later claimed that a format change was the reason why Charron wasn't invited to film the annual freestyle cypher. Charron eventually released a verse aimed at the BET network and a number of rappers. The following year, Charron was invited to participate in the BET Awards 2014 cypher alongside Papoose, Remy Ma and Jarren Benton.

The National Post featured Charron in May 2013 for his controversial song "Smoking Crack with Rob Ford," which focused on then-mayor Rob Ford.

In the summer of 2013, Charron performed as an opening act during the Canadian dates on Method Man and Redman's tour.

On May 29, 2016, when Nick Cannon issued an open challenge for a $100,000 rap battle during the weekend events of the BET Awards 2016, Charron accepted the challenge and dropped a verse aimed at Cannon. Nick Cannon later responded to Charron's video with a few bars in a Facebook post of his own.

In July 2016, Charron was cast as Billy Pistolz for the film Bodied, which was co-produced by Eminem and released in 2017.

In 2017, Charron appeared on season 9 of the MTV show Wild 'N Out as a cast member. From 2017 to 2023, he made 40 appearances over ten seasons.

== Discography ==
=== Studio albums ===
- Lied to My Face (2014)

=== Mixtapes ===
- Bath Salts and Vinegar Chips (2013)
