= Pat Stay =

Canadian rapper (1986–2022)

- Born: Patrick Wayne Stay; February 18, 1986; Dartmouth, Nova Scotia, Canada
- Died: September 4, 2022 (aged 36); Halifax, Nova Scotia, Canada
- Occupations: Battle rapper; hip hop artist
- Years active: 2007–2022

Patrick Wayne "Pat" Stay (February 18, 1986 – September 4, 2022) was a Canadian battle rapper and hip hop artist from Dartmouth, Nova Scotia, also known as the Sucka-Free Boss.

== Biography ==
=== Early life and beginnings ===
Patrick Wayne Stay was born on February 18, 1986, to Wayne Stay and Greta Grant (née Stiner). He attended Dartmouth High School.

=== Career ===
Stay's battle rap debut came in 2007 against Critical in the now-defunct Elements League, a league in Nova Scotia where he battled against local up-and-coming rappers.

He began his career in the King of the Dot league in Toronto at 23 years old, making his debut in 2009. At the title match at King of the Dot's World Domination 4 in 2013, he defeated battle rapper Arcane to claim the championship. He defended his KOTD chain in title matches against Dizaster, Daylyt, Charron, and Illmaculate.

In 2015, fellow Canadian Drake opted out of the 57th Annual Grammy Awards to host and judge a battle rap event in Toronto, where Stay competed against Charron.

Stay expanded his influence into international battle leagues and ultimately achieved recognition in the prominent battle rap platform, the Ultimate Rap League. He was involved in over 40 battles and headlined events in 4 countries. His career includes battles with Arsonal, DNA, Hollow Da Don, and Tay Roc, among others.

In the summer of 2016, Stay was cast in the film Bodied, which was co-produced by Eminem and released in 2017.

On September 2, 2022, just two days before his death, Stay released a diss track towards rapper the Game titled "Warm Up" along with a music video on his YouTube channel.

== Personal life and death ==
Stay was the father of two children.

On September 4, 2022, Stay died at age 36 after being fatally stabbed at a Halifax, Nova Scotia nightclub. Tributes flowed in from the battle rap community, as well as from Drake and Eminem. The suspect, Adam Drake, was arrested several days after the incident. Drake was convicted of second-degree murder in June 2025 and sentenced to life in prison.
