= Adam Ferrone =

American battle rapper and podcaster

- Born: April 25, 1988 (age 38); United States
- Other name: Rone
- Occupations: Podcaster, internet personality, battle rapper
- Spouse: Allison Dale (m. 2021)
- Children: 2
- Website: barstoolsports.com

Adam Ferrone (born April 25, 1988), also known as Rone, is an American battle rapper, internet personality, and podcaster for Barstool Sports.

== Early life and education ==
Rone attended Pennsylvania State University where he majored in journalism and theater. While in college, he began Battle rap as a hobby. In 2008, he went semi-viral for his battle against Charles Hamilton (rapper), a battle-rapper from Ohio who was performing at Penn State at the time. In 2010, Complex Magazine ranked Rone's battle victory over Hamilton as the 8th "most ridiculous" moment in battle-rap history. Rone graduated from Penn State in 2010.

== Battle Rap and music career ==
After college, Rone moved to New York City and began a battle rap career in the Grind Time battle-rap promotion.

He later joined the King of the Dot (KOTD) promotion. At KOTD, he became a battle-rap champion and had several viral matches against rappers such as Big T, Charron, and Illmaculate.

Rone signed a record deal with Raw Life Records, a Philadelphia-based label co-owned by rapper Dice Raw. In June 19 of 2012, Rone released the album, The First Story. He released his second album, Committed, in 2015. His third album, Steak, was released in 2018.

In the summer of 2016, Rone was cast in the film Bodied, which was co-produced by Eminem and released in 2017.

At Barstool, Rone hosts a battle rap competition known as The Nicest, which is a twist on traditional battle-rap where participants engage in compliment battles rather than try to insult each other. The first season of the series was shown on Sling TV. The later series were shown on YouTube.

Rone is the lead singer of the band Pup Punk along with PFT Commenter and other Barstool personalities.

Rone has ghost written for various celebrities including CM Punk and on the show, Drop the Mic.

=== Awards and accolades ===
In 2016, Rone won his first battle-rap championship with King of the Dot, against Illmaculate. He successfully defended his title against Caustic, but lost in 2017 to Head Ice.

In 2022, BET listed Rone as one of the top 50 battle-rappers of all time.

== Barstool Sports ==
Rone is currently the co-host of several podcasts at Barstool. He is the co-host of the Son of a Boy Dad podcast with Francis Ellis and Harry Settel (Lil Sas) and the Hoopin' and Hollerin' podcast with Jason Williams. He is also the host of RoneDotCom.

Rone also acts as a Sideline reporter at Barstool's Rough N' Rowdy boxing events. He's had a similar role at other Barstool sports event such as the 2022 Arizona Bowl; 2023 Arizona Bowl; and the 2022 Barstool Invitational in college basketball.

Rone has previously had podcasts with Caleb Pressley (Young and Happy) and Patrick Beverley (The Pat Bev Show with Rone). He was also a co-host of the Yak along with various Barstool personalities including: Dan Katz, Kyle Bauer, Nick Taurani, Harry Settel, and Caleb Pressley.

In 2026, Rone won the 5th season of Surviving Barstool, taking home a grand prize of $250,000.
