= Hollow da Don =

American battle rapper

Hollow Da Don
- Born: Nigel Bennett; January 28, 1984 (age 42); Queens, New York
- Origin: Queens, New York
- Genres: Hip hop
- Occupations: Rapper, battle rapper
- Years active: 2006 – present

Nigel Bennett (born January 28, 1984) is an American battle rapper, better known by his stage name Hollow da Don.

== Life and career ==
Hollow da Don was on 106 & Park's Freestyle Friday for seven weeks undefeated, earning a place in the program's Hall of Fame by 2006. In 2007, he put up a strong performance in the Houston division of Jumpoff's World Rap Championships, earning an MVP nomination with an 8-2 record.

Hollow's career took off with the birth of the new-gen battle rap leagues where MCs could blend their freestyle raps with written rhymes. Making his debut at NYC's Fight Klub in 2008, Hollow displayed freestyle ability, rhyme schemes & punchlines that overwhelmed most of the competition, winning ten straight battles before finally falling to New Jersey's Arsonal in a controversial matchup. At the same time, Hollow was tearing through the newly formed East Coast division of Grind Time and making trips out to the Fresh Coast and St. Louis to clash with their veterans. A student of the game, Hollow claimed that his knowledge of battle rap and its fans allowed him to succeed in any environment.

Hollow debuted on SMACK/URL against Chicago's Big T in 2010. Since 2013, he has been consistently rated one of the best battle rappers by battle rap fan communities.

More recently, Hollow da Don participated on SMACK/URL's 'Nome 3' vs Tsu Surf then he had a judged battle on Eminem's Total Slaughter battle rap league against Grammy Award-nominated rapper Joe Budden, whom he defeated by unanimous decision.

He competed against Loaded Lux in a highly anticipated and controversial UW Battle League event on January 26, 2014.

Hollow da Don faced Charlie Clips on May 9, 2015, and most spectators and battle rap bloggers have Hollow winning.

Hollow da Don faced Pat Stay, the previous KOTD champion, on Dec. 6th, 2015 in London. Fans were led to believe was going to be a traditional three-round battle, only to discover at the last minute that it would be a one-round battle instead. Although battle rap is highly subjective, many sources agree that Hollow's round against Pat Stay was one of his best and that he won the match.

A rematch between Hollow Da Don and Pat Stay took place in May at KOTD's Massacre event.

Hollow also had a surprise one-round battle against Dizaster at KOTD's Massacre 3 event. This was a very controversial battle, as it sparked a rivalry between once good friends Hollow Da Don and Math Hoffa. Hollow and Diz reportedly have a full three-round battle slated.

Hollow recently went against Tay Roc for Summer Madness 6. Many Sources believed Hollow won that close match.

Recently, Hollow has been on a path of grudge matches.

First, Hollow had his rematch with Arsonal a decade later after their original at the URL event "Smack Volume 2" on March 31, 2018. In November, Hollow returned to URL at their "Summer Madness 8" event to battle John John Da Don, fellow battle rapper and founder of Atlanta's Bullpen Battle League. The two had a physical exchange during the face-off at the UDUBB event where he battled Loaded Lux. The battle is considered highly debatable with many pointing at John John Da Don as edging the win over Hollow.

In 2018, Hollow founded "Hidden Label Clothing" with hip-hop producer Mike Zombie.

On Feb 16, 2019, Hollow debuted in Rare Breed Entertainment, and battled his old colleague Math Hoffa in a highly anticipated and heated battle with Math Hoffa, whom many were expecting to lose pulled the battle to his table. A very controversial battle. Later that summer, Hollow was slated to perform in a 2 on 2 match with former opponent turned friend, Loaded Lux as the group Loaded Hollowz after the 2 appeared in a 2 on 2 match in the battle rap film Bodied. Their opponents were supposed to be the team Guntitles, composed of Tay Roc and Tsu Surf, 2 opponents Hollow faced in the past. However, weeks before the battle, Tsu Surf was arrested leaving the young battle rapper Chess to replace him, forming the group Gunz N Cake. The battle took place on August 9, with many battle rap fans and critics having Loaded Hollowz winning after a critically acclaimed performance from both Hollow Da Don and Loaded Lux.

== List of Battles ==
- Hollow Da Don vs Yung Cyph (2006)
- Hollow Da Don vs Jay Focus (2008)
- Hollow Da Don vs Philly Swain (2009)
- Hollow Da Don vs Amzilla (2009)
- Hollow Da Don vs Yung Ill (2009)
- Hollow Da Don vs Arsonal (2009)
- Hollow Da Don vs Illmaculate (2009)
- Hollow Da Don vs Big T (2009)
- Hollow Da Don vs Aye Verb (2009)
- Hollow Da Don vs Passwurdz (2009)
- Hollow Da Don vs Okwerdz (2009)
- Hollow Da Don vs Goodz (2011)
- Hollow Da Don vs Hitman Holla (2011)
- Hollow Da Don vs Tsu Surf (2013)
- Hollow Da Don vs Loaded Lux (2014)
- Hollow Da Don vs Joe Budden (2014)
- Hollow Da Don vs Charlie Clips (2015)
- Hollow Da Don vs Pat Stay (2015)
- Hollow Da Don vs Pat Stay II (2016)
- Hollow Da Don vs Dizaster (2017)
- Hollow Da Don vs Tay Roc (2017)
- Hollow Da Don vs Arsonal II (2018)
- Hollow Da Don vs John John Da Don (2018)
- Hollow Da Don vs Math Hoffa (2019)
- Loaded Hollowz (with Loaded Lux) vs Gunz N Cake (2019)
- Hollow Da Don vs Danny Myers (2019)
- Hollow Da Don vs Rum Nitty (2021)
- Hollow Da Don vs K-shine (2021)
- Hollow Da Don vs DNA (2022)
- Hollow Da Don vs Geechi Gotti (2022)
- Hollow Da Don vs Charron (2023)
- Hollow Da Don vs Ill Will (2023)
- Hollow Da Don vs TheSaurus (2023)
- Hollow Da Don vs Nu Jerzey Twork (2023)
- Hollow Da Don vs Quill (2004)
- Hollow Da Don vs Swamp (2026)
- Hollow Da Don vs Ave (2026)
- Hollow Da Don vs A Ward (2026)
- Hollow Da Don vs Jaz The Rapper (2026)
- Hollow Da Don vs Chef Trez (2026)
