= Queen of the Ring (rap battle league) =

American battle rap league

Queen of the Ring Entertainment
- Industry: Battle rap
- Founded: August 2010
- Founder: Debo and Vague
- Key people: BABS, DEBO, Vague, 40 Barrs and E Hart
- Website: http://queenofthering.tv

Queen of the Ring (QOTR) is a women's battle rap league, often credited as being the first of its kind. It was founded in 2010 by co-founders Debo, Vague, and Babs Bunny in New York City, NY. The series has approximately 64 million YouTube views and around 263k subscribers since its founding in August 2010. The founders said they created Queen of the Ring as a spinoff of King Of The Ring, which is a tournament for aspiring battle rappers where the winner is secured a spot in the industry leading Ultimate Rap League. Their mission was to showcase female emcee's, in a male dominated lyrical sport.
