= Kid Twist =

Kid Twist may refer to:

- Kid Twist (rapper), Canadian hip hop musician
- Max Zwerbach (1884–1908), New York gangster and later successor of Monk Eastman
- Abe Reles (1906–1941), New York mobster, member of Louis "Lepke" Buchalter's Murder Inc, and later government informant
