= S.M.A.C.K. DVD =

Series of DVDs by Troy "Smack" Mitchell

- Founders: Troy "Smack" Mitchell, Craig Davis, Eugene Green, Alley Kat
- Brands: S.M.A.C.K. DVD, Ultimate Rap League

SMACKDVD.COM

The S.M.A.C.K. DVDs were a series of street DVDs produced by Troy "Smack" Mitchell, an entrepreneur and videographer from Queens Village, New York. The DVDs featured interviews, concert footage, and live MC battles with hip-hop artists. S.M.A.C.K. stands for Streets, Music, Arts, Culture & Knowledge.
