= Queen of the Ring =

Queen of the Ring may refer to:

- Queen of the Ring tournament, a women's professional wrestling tournament held by WWE
- Queen of the Ring (rap battle league), a women's battle rap league
- Queen of the Ring (TV series), South Korean TV series
- Queen of the Ring (film), a 2024 American wrestling biopic about Mildred Burke
- Sabine Schmitz, German racing driver, known as Queen of the Ring or Queen of the Nürburgring
