= Chilla Jones =

Musician and battle rapper

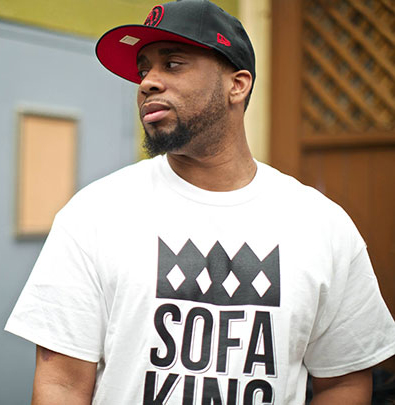

Background information
- Born: Jerome Jones
- Origin: Boston, Massachusetts, United States
- Genres: Battle Rap; Hip hop
- Occupations: Hip-Hop Artist, Battle Rapper
- Website: www.chillajones.com

Jerome "Chilla" Jones is a musician and battle rapper from Boston, Massachusetts.

== Discography ==
=== Mixtapes ===
- 2007 - Jones: The Mixtape (Hosted by DJ Vlad)
- 2008 - The Freestyle Champ (Hosted by DJ 2Thirteen)
- 2009 - The Countdown (Mixed by DJ 2Thirteen)
- 2009 - Time Bomb (Hosted by DJ On & On)
- 2010 - 23: The Mixtape (Mixed by DJ 2Thirteen)
- 2010 - The Juggernaut (Mixed by DJ 2Thirteen)
- 2012 - Certifried Vol.1: High Def (w/ Riznut)
- 2012 - Certifried Vol.2: The Passion (w/ Riznut)
- 2014 - Welcome to Bosstown (Mixed by DJ 2Thirteen)

== Battle Rap History ==
- Vs. Gatman Jones, Funky Fresh Radio - March 21, 2011
- Vs. Interstate Flamez, Shark Tank Battlegrounds - June 11, 2011
- Vs. Strange Da Wordplay King, Ultimate Rap League Proving Grounds - February 11, 2012 (Unreleased)
- Vs. Cash Eatin', Ultimate Rap League Proving Grounds - March 24, 2012
- Vs. M. Ciddy, Poison Pen/Ultimate Rap League - July 15, 2012
- Vs. JC, Ultimate Rap League - August 18, 2012
- Vs. B-Magic, Ultimate Rap League - November 17, 2012
- Vs. DNA, Ultimate Rap League - June 23, 2013
- Vs. The Deadman, King of the Dot - October 11,2013
- Vs. Young Kannon, Go-Rilla Warfare/Black Ice Cartel - October 19, 2013
- Vs. Charlie Clips, Empire Battle League - January 5, 2014 (Unreleased)
- Vs. Blackheart Adonis, iBattle Worldwide - March 29,2014
- Vs. Daylyt, King of the Dot Entertainment - April 19, 2014
- Vs. Real Deal, King of the Dot Entertainment - June 28, 2014
- Vs. Young Ill, Dallas/Fort Worth Battle League - October 18, 2014
- Vs. Cee Major, Don't Flop - November 16, 2014
- Vs. Dialect, King of the Dot Entertainment - November 22, 2014
- Vs. 100 Bulletz, King of the Dot Entertainment - February 7, 2015
- Vs. Math Hoffa, Don't Flop - April 4, 2015
- Vs. Conceited, King of the Dot Entertainment - May 16,2015
- Vs. Dizaster, King of the Dot Entertainment - June 27, 2015
- Vs. Prep, Ultimate Rap League - July 25, 2015
- Vs. Pass, King of the Dot Entertainment - August 22, 2015
- Vs. Tony D, Don't Flop - November 15, 2015
- Vs. Th3 Saga, Ultimate Rap League - December 12, 2015
- Vs. QP, Black Ice Cartel - January 10, 2016
- Vs. Cortez, Ultimate Rap League - March 6, 2016
- w/ B-Magic Vs. T-Top & Brizz Rawsteen, Ultimate Rap League - March 26, 2016
- Vs. The Saurus, 413 Battle League- November 14, 2016
- Vs. Arsonal, UDubb Network Battle League - January 22, 2017
- Vs. Gjonaj, King of the Dot Entertainment - April 15, 2017
- Vs. Illmaculate, King of the Dot Entertainment - July 22, 2017
- Vs. Madflex, Counter Productive - July 29, 2017
- Vs. QPacalypse, No Coast - September 23, 2017
- Vs. Charlie Clips (Rematch), Black Ice Cartel - September 27, 2017
- Vs. Jey The Nitewing, Skytier Premier - November 11, 2017
- Vs. Vega, Real Talk - November 25, 2017
- Vs. Cephdeezy The Sandman, Ball Hogg Ent. - December 23, 2017
- Vs. Krome, King of the Dot Entertainment - February 3, 2018
- Vs. Mr. RE, Chalked Out - February 10, 2018
- Vs. Ness Lee, No Coast - February 23, 2018
- Vs. See Jee, Premier Rap Battle League - March 3, 2018
- Vs. Stuey Newton, Evrylane Ent. - March 10, 2018
