= Don't Flop =

British rap battle league

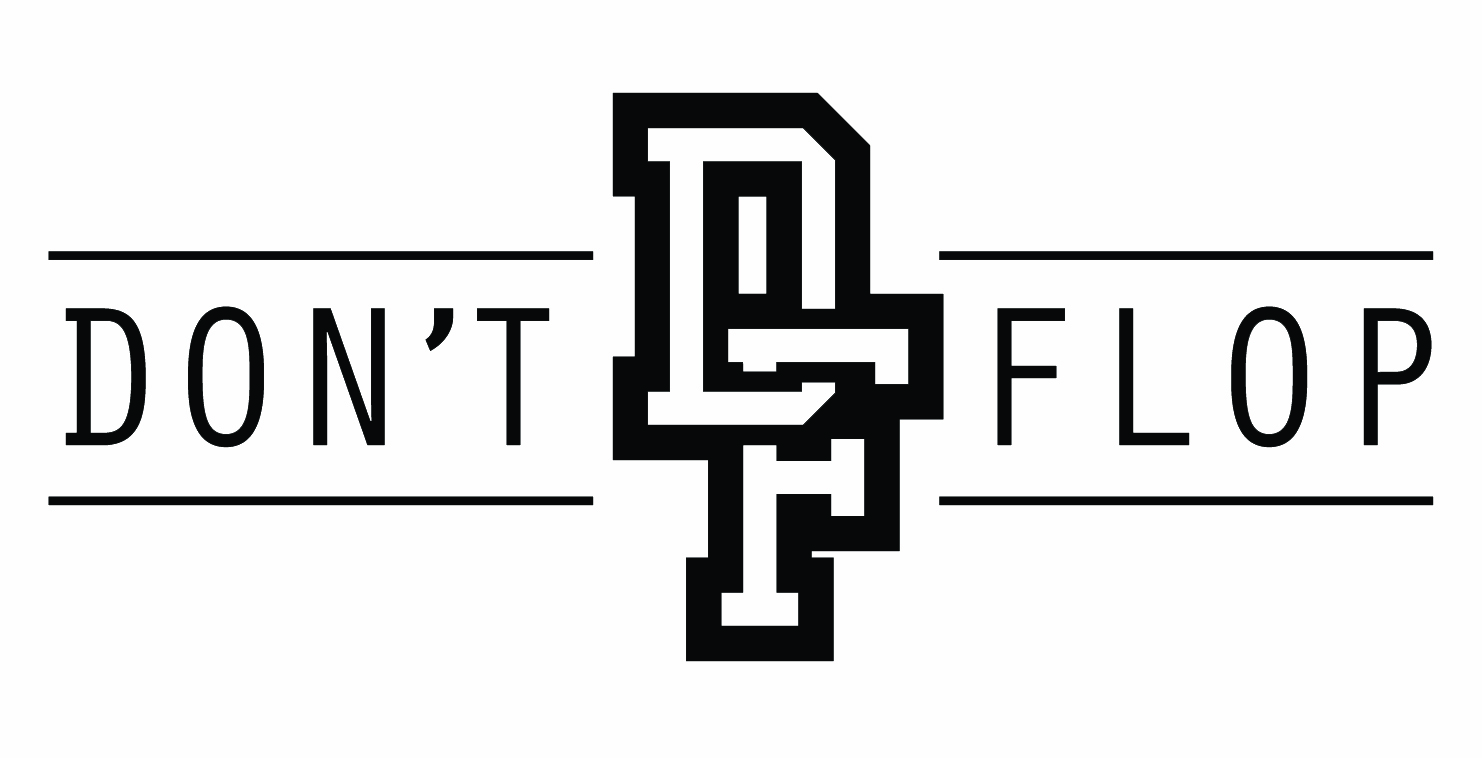
- Industry: Battle rap
- Founded: 2008
- Founders: Rowan "Eurgh" Faife Freddie "Cruger" Scott-Miller
- Headquarters: United Kingdom
- Website: DontFlop.com

Don't Flop Entertainment is one of the largest rap battle leagues based in the United Kingdom. It was founded by longtime friends Eurgh (Rowan Faife) and Cruger (Freddie Scott-Miller) in 2008. Since then, notable performers include Oshea, Sensa, Lunar C, Rizzle (of Rizzle Kicks), Tony D (of Poisonous Poets), Blizzard, Mercury Music Prize nominee Soweto Kinch, Harry Baker and Mark Grist. Several rappers from Don't Flop have also made appearances in the Canadian rap battle league King of the Dot, as well as youth and music broadcaster SB.TV. American rappers Illmaculate and Soul Khan have also made appearances on Don't Flop, both as rappers and judges.

== Format ==
Don't Flop battles are usually three rounds, with each round being 60 to 90 seconds, although significant main event battles will sometimes have three minute rounds, there have also been instances of unlimited rounds. A coin flip typically decides who goes first, and the emcees alternate after each round. Sometimes however, the battlers will decide between themselves off camera who will go first, and in a championship match, the Champion will decide who goes first. A panel of three to five judges then decide the winner (there have been instances of a seven-judge format in title matches). Up until recently, an overtime round would settle a draw. However, this has now been removed from most leagues and a winner has to be decided after the 3 standard rounds.

== Events ==
Don't Flop events are often divided across England. Mancunian rapper Chronicle organised Don't Flop North events To The Test 1 to 9, with Don't Flop co-founder, and London/Norwich based promoter and battle rapper Eurgh stepping in to organise the tenth event. A London rap battle event entitled "Blood in the Water" was thrown every year from 2009 to 2011. Emcees from other rap battle leagues such as Grindtime, King of the Dot, and Basementality Battles came to the UK to battle other opponents. Don't Flop held its first USA vs Canada battle in 2011 with Jonny Storm vs Charron. Today, there are a minimum of two events each month that are held all over the country.

== Innovation ==
In recent times, Don't Flop has led the way in introducing new forms of battling. In 2012, Don't Flop hosted its annual April Fools event. Here, many new formats of the written battle style were introduced. At the same event, Don't Flop also hosted its first ever 3-way battle. Then, at the "Second Quarter Try-Outs" event in Manchester, a battle which involved both rapping and guitar playing was showcased for the first time. Don't Flop has also shown innovation in the way battles are judged to ensure the right decision is made. Moving away from a traditional format, in the 2013 tag team tournament, judging was done after the event by judges that video their decision, which was then edited in to the battle video. Also in mid 2015, Don't Flop introduced a new format of battling known as "Freestyle Royal Rumble", a format that has a non specific number of participants (that can be increased or decreased in the span of the rumble) all freestyling with and against one another in either a tag team or free for all objective.

== List of Champions ==
Until 2012, there was no crowning achievement within Don't Flop. Many people thought that Oshea and Sensa were the two best battlers in the league. They battled once already, and planned to battle again for the title. Oshea defeated Sensa to become the league's first champion.

Since then, the title has changed hands twice. Tony D, the second champion, is the only champion to successfully defend the title three times, subsequently relinquishing the title after the third defense. At Checkpoint 2, Soul and Cee Major battled for the vacant title, in which Soul won and became Don't Flop's third champion.

In 2016, Soul successfully defended his title against Raptor Warhurst. Soul was unsuccessful with his second title defense against Shox the Rebel.

Solo Champions

No.	Name	Event	Date	Successful Defenses
1	Oshea *defeated Sensa	To The Test Ten; Leeds, England	Feb 5, 2012	0
2	Tony D *defeated Oshea *defended against Definition *defended against Chris Leese *defended against Unanymous *vacated title after defeating Unanymous	Don't Flop 4th Birthday; London, England	Oct 20, 2012	3
3	Soul *defeated Cee Major to determine new champion *defended against Raptor Warhurst	Checkpoint 2 London, England	April 25, 2015	1
4	Shox The Rebel *defeated Soul *vacated title after hiatus	Checkpoint 4 London, England	April 29, 2017	0
5	Craft-D *defeated Unanymous to determine new champion *defended against Shuffle-T	One of A Kind; Bristol, England	February 29, 2020	1
6	Quill *defeated Craft-D	Fighting Talk; Bristol, England	November 12, 2022	0
7	Gemin1 *defeated Quill	Institution; London, England	November 5, 2023	0

Doubles Champions

No.	Name	Event	Date	Successful Defenses
1	Cracker & Cee Major *defeated Bamalam & Cystic	Verdict; London, England	June 8, 2013	0
2	Shuffle-T & Marlo *defeated Cracker & Cee Major *defended against Dialect & Zen *defended against Matter & P Solja	Don't Flop 5th Birthday; Leeds, England	Nov 9, 2013	2

== See also ==
- Lord of the Mics
