= Devil May Cry (TV series) =

2025 animated television series

- Promotional poster
- Genre: Action; Adventure; Drama; Horror; Science fantasy
- Created by: Adi Shankar
- Based on: Devil May Cry by Capcom
- Developed by: Adi Shankar; Alex Larsen
- Showrunner: Adi Shankar
- Written by: Adi Shankar; Alex Larsen; Keely Macdonald; Shakira Pressley
- Story by: Adi Shankar; Alex Larsen
- Voices of: Johnny Yong Bosch; Scout Taylor-Compton; Hoon Lee; Chris Coppola; Kevin Conroy; Ian James Corlett; Robbie Daymond; Graham McTavish
- Music by: Power Glove
- Opening theme: "Rollin'", performed by Limp Bizkit (season 1) "Jackpot", performed by Power Glove (season 2)
- Countries of origin: South Korea; United States
- Original language: English
- No. of seasons: 2
- No. of episodes: 16

Production
- Executive producers: Adi Shankar; Haruhiro Tsujimoto
- Editors: Kim Gyung-chan; Kyung Min-Ho; Kim Min-kyoung
- Running time: 21–39 minutes
- Production companies: Studio Mir; Adi Shankar Animation; Capcom; Studio La Cachette (episode 6)

Original release
- Network: Netflix
- Release: April 3, 2025 – present

Devil May Cry is an adult animated action horror television series created by Adi Shankar for Netflix. Based on the Japanese video game franchise of the same name by Capcom, the series follows the demon hunter for-hire Dante as he attempts to foil a demonic invasion of Earth orchestrated by the White Rabbit while also coming into conflict with human soldier Mary Ann Arkham.

Shankar serves as the showrunner and executive produces alongside Haruhiro Tsujimoto. Produced by Studio Mir, Adi Shankar Animation, and Capcom, the series features the voices of Johnny Yong Bosch, Scout Taylor-Compton, Hoon Lee, Chris Coppola, Kevin Conroy, Ian James Corlett, Robbie Daymond, and Graham McTavish in main roles.

The first season premiered on April 3, 2025, on Netflix. One week after the first season's release, the series was renewed for a second season, which premiered on May 12, 2026. In June 2026, the series was renewed for a third and final season. The series has received generally positive reviews from critics.

== Premise ==
While being hunted by the government organization Dark Realm Command (DARKCOM) under Vice President William Baines, Dante, a cambion demon hunter for-hire, comes into conflict with a demon-obsessed terrorist called the White Rabbit who seeks revenge on the human race.

== Voice cast and characters ==
=== Main ===
- Johnny Yong Bosch as Dante, a laid-back professional demon hunter who was born to a human woman and a demon knight, Sparda. His demonic physiology enables him to be far stronger than other humans, move fast enough to appear to slow down time, survive otherwise fatal wounds, and sense the presence of demons. Dante has a good sense of humor, but also possesses a pathological hatred of demons due to their role in his mother's death
  - Kue Lawrence and Adam LaBelle as young Dante
- Scout Taylor-Compton as Mary Ann Arkham / Lady, a no-nonsense DARKCOM lieutenant whom Dante nicknames "Lady"
  - Evie Hsu as young Mary
- Hoon Lee as the White Rabbit, a demonic terrorist plotting to merge the demon and human worlds and bring about complete human extinction
- Chris Coppola as Enzo Ferino, an information broker who helps Dante find work
- Kevin Conroy (season 1) and Ian James Corlett (Note: Corlett provides additional dialogue for Baines in episodes 3 and 8 of the first season) (season 2) as William Baines, the Vice President of the United States and head of DARKCOM
- Robbie Daymond as Vergil, Dante's twin brother and his only equal in strength and skill. He is known as Nelo Angelo when in his demonic form.
  - Marcel Nahapetian as young Vergil
- Graham McTavish as Arius von Enhrenberg, a sorcerer who is the CEO of the Uroboros Corporation and founder of DARKCOM
  - Quinn Eakins as young Arius

=== Supporting ===
Introduced in season 1

- Zeke Alton as Dr. Fisher, a paranormal scientist at DARKCOM
- Jon Gries as Jed Hopper, the President of the United States
- Benjamin Abiola as Anders, a DARKCOM agent and newly recruited member of Mary's team
- Sunkrish Bala as King, a DARKCOM agent and member of Mary's team
- Fryda Wolff as Ninja, a DARKCOM agent and member of Mary's team
- Leilani Barrett as Patriot, a DARKCOM agent and member of Mary's team
- Tina Majorino as Sentry, a DARKCOM agent and member of Mary's team
- Kenny Omega as Sly, a demon disguised as one of the mercenaries hired by DARKCOM to capture Dante
- Jason E. Kelley as:
  - Arnold, a mercenary acquainted with Dante
  - Bruce, a mercenary hired to capture Dante
- Erica Lindbeck as Kalina Ann, Mary's deceased mother
- Ray Chase as:
  - John Arkham / Jester, Mary's father, who became obsessed with trying to prove that demons exist and later transformed into a mischievous clown demon that serves Mundus and killed Mary’s mother
  - Agni & Rudra, a pair of demon brothers working for the White Rabbit
  - Mundus, the king of Hell, who seeks to take over Earth
- Kari Wahlgren as:
  - Eva, the human mother of Dante and Vergil, who was brutally slain by demons when they were children
  - Echidna, a plant serpent demon working for the White Rabbit
- Jason Marnocha as Cavaliere, a demon knight working for the White Rabbit
- Roger L. Jackson as:
  - Plasma, a shapeshifting demon working for the White Rabbit
  - Griff, a DARKCOM agent who Plasma assumes the appearance of
- Donovan Patton as Bloodstryke, a demon minion who serves the White Rabbit

Introduced in season 2

- John Omohundro as Tom Remington, Jr., a former football player turned DARKCOM soldier
- Tony Todd (episode 9) and James C. Mathis III (episodes 15–16) as Beowulf, a chimera demon who serves Mundus.
- Salli Saffioti as Chi, Arius' second-in-command
- Tara Strong as Nell Goldstein, DARKCOM's chief weapons engineer
- Jim Conroy as Stan Sullivan, the host of an American talk show
- Andrew Morgado as Argosax the Chaos, the imprisoned former king of Hell whom Arius seeks to free using the four Arcana relics
- Rick D. Wasserman as the Trismagia, a three-faced demon who serves as Hell's oracle
- Keith David as Lucan, an aging professor who has learned to wield demonic powers and is knowledgeable of Dante's demonic heritage
- Paris Johnson as Matilda "Mattie", Lucan's orphaned granddaughter

== Episodes ==
=== Series overview ===
Season	Episodes	Originally released
1	8	April 3, 2025
2	8	May 12, 2026

=== Season 1 (2025) ===
No. overall	No. in season	Title	Directed by	Written by	Original release date
1	1	"Inferno"	Kim Sun Min	Story by : Adi Shankar and Alex Larsen; Screenplay by : Alex Larsen	April 3, 2025
The White Rabbit, a demonic terrorist, orchestrates a break-in at the Vatican Museums and steals Force Edge, a sword once owned by the legendary demon Sparda, who turned against his own kind and created a magical barrier between Hell and Earth. The Rabbit massacres the men he hired before blowing up the building, and announces his plan to destroy the barrier between realms and usher in the apocalypse. In the wake of the attack, the U.S. government consults with Dr. Fisher, a scientist working for the interdimensional security firm DARKCOM, which is led by Vice President William Baines. After Fisher theorizes that the Rabbit is searching for a demon hunter, DARKCOM captures and interrogates the information broker Enzo Ferino, who informs them that the Rabbit is searching for the hunter Dante. Baines and Fisher then deduce that the Rabbit needs to combine the Forge Edge with Sparda's magical amulet, which he split into two halves. Meanwhile, Dante faces off against Plasma, a shapeshifting demon who, despite taking multiple different forms, including Dante's deceased twin brother Vergil, is unsuccessful in stealing Dante's half of the amulet.
2	2	"Our Lady of Sorrows"	Han Seung Woo	Story by : Adi Shankar and Alex Larsen; Screenplay by : Alex Larsen	April 3, 2025
Baines hires dozens of mercenaries to track down Dante and procure the amulet, overseen by an elite team of DARKCOM agents led by Lieutenant Mary Ann Arkham, who recognizes one of the mercenaries as a demon in disguise and promptly kills it. Anders, the only survivor of DARKCOM's attempt to capture the White Rabbit, is also recruited to Mary's team. Baines forces Enzo to draw Dante out, but Dante sees through him and refuses to give up the amulet because it was given to him by his deceased mother. He then lays a trap and effortlessly takes out multiple waves of mercenaries before engaging Mary (whom he nicknames "Lady") in combat. During their fight, Mary theorizes that Dante is a human-demon hybrid because of his inhuman physical prowess and healing abilities, but he denies it. She steals the amulet and mocks Dante for being unaware of his true nature. Dante attempts to stop Mary from escaping, but she manages to subdue him and implants a bomb in Dante's neck. Mary and her team then prepare to transport Dante and Enzo to their headquarters for questioning.
3	3	"The Deep and Savage Way"	Park So Young	Story by : Adi Shankar and Alex Larsen; Screenplay by : Alex Larsen	April 3, 2025
In a flashback, Mary and her parents narrowly survive a demon attack. Mary's father becomes a pariah when he tries to alert the authorities, who believe he has gone insane. In the present, Baines interrogates Dante and tells him that, despite his demonic nature, Dante can redeem himself before God by working for the government, though Dante maintains that his unnatural abilities are due to a mutation. The White Rabbit and his enforcers: Cavaliere, Echidna, Plasma, Agni & Rudra, ambush DARKCOM's convoy and engage Mary's team. Anders is revealed as a double agent after the Rabbit previously threatened his family, and willingly gives him Dante's amulet. The Rabbit combines it with his half of the amulet, but Fisher realizes that he still requires another component before the barrier between realms can be destroyed. The Rabbit then kills Fisher, wounds Anders, and takes Enzo hostage. Dante breaks free from his containment and pursues the Rabbit, but is almost killed when the bomb implanted in his neck explodes. The Rabbit then refers to Dante as the son of Sparda and takes him captive. Meanwhile, in the aftermath of the battle, Plasma shapeshifts into a DARKCOM agent.
4	4	"All Hope Abandon"	Han Seung Woo	Story by : Adi Shankar and Alex Larsen; Screenplay by : Alex Larsen	April 3, 2025
After Mary's team is infiltrated by Plasma, they follow a tracker to the White Rabbit's location at an abandoned apartment complex. However, the Rabbit lures them into a trap, where Cavaliere and Echidna slaughter all the agents, leaving a traumatized Mary as the only survivor. She evades Cavaliere by relying on the help of a family living in the building, but turns her gun on them when she realizes they are demons. The family informs Mary that they fled Hell among other demon refugees with the Rabbit's help, but he later went mad and began experimenting on them. Reconsidering her black-and-white stance on demons, Mary spares the family and leaves. Dante and Enzo find themselves held captive by Agni and Rudra on Baines' hijacked plane. Baines remains confident that God has bigger plans for him, though the other hostages remain terrified. Dante continues to doubt that Sparda is his father, while the Rabbit decries his legacy for betraying demonkind. Dante activates his demon abilities after remembering his traumatic childhood and kills Agni, causing an enraged Rudra to blow up the plane in response.
5	5	"Descent"	Park So Young	Story by : Adi Shankar and Alex Larsen; Screenplay by : Alex Larsen	April 3, 2025
Mary discovers a laboratory where the White Rabbit had been conducting his experiments. She reunites with the disguised Plasma but realizes his identity when he refers to Hell by its demon name "Makai". Echidna then ambushes them and accidentally attacks the disguised Plasma, allowing Mary to kill Echidna. When DARKCOM reinforcements arrive, Mary delivers a speech telling them to evacuate the demon refugees. Dante uses his newfound abilities to transform into a winged demonic form and saves Enzo, Baines, and the other hostages. He then continues his fight with Rudra, who is killed by Mary when they crash into the Rabbit's hideout. Dante confesses that she was right about his demonic heritage, and Mary determines that the Rabbit needs Dante's blood to fulfill his plan. The Rabbit then threatens to unleash his army of demons if Dante does not surrender, and Mary discovers that the Rabbit's true goal is to seek revenge against DARKCOM. When Baines learns that his agents are rescuing the demon refugees, he instead orders them all killed, as Plasma watches on in horror. Plasma then commits suicide by blowing up the building, killing all the agents inside, as Dante and Mary narrowly escape the blast.
6	6	"The First Circle"	Hong Jee Young	Story by : Adi Shankar and Alex Larsen; Screenplay by : Alex Larsen	April 3, 2025
In a series of flashbacks, a young Mary becomes increasingly distant from her parents while her father becomes obsessed with his research to prove that demons exist. She spends time away from home, only to return and witness her father transform himself into a demon and kill her mother. Mary defends herself, and her father catches fire as their house goes up in flames. Elsewhere, an orphaned boy is moved into a foster home but is routinely bullied and neglected. While reading his copy of Alice's Adventures in Wonderland, he discovers a portal and heads inside, believing it to be Wonderland. The boy arrives in Hell and quickly befriends a group of lower-class demons living in fear. After finding a glowing crystal, he starts experimenting with it, but one of his friends becomes ill due to the poor environmental conditions and dies. Many years later, the boy uses the crystal to power a portal device and starts transporting demon refugees to Earth. Mary and her team soon discover the operation and kill many of the refugees. Having survived, the boy makes plans to dismantle DARKCOM before stitching a White Rabbit mask to his face.
7	7	"At the Gates of Paradise"	Han Seung Woo	Story by : Adi Shankar and Alex Larsen; Screenplay by : Alex Larsen	April 3, 2025
The White Rabbit meets with a horned demon, who previously gave the Rabbit Vergil's half of the amulet, and receives a vial of Vergil's blood. Seeking vengeance, Mary locks up Dante, confronts the Rabbit alone, and threatens to incinerate Dante to prevent the Rabbit from getting his blood. When the Rabbit calls Mary's bluff, she engages his army, but is paralyzed by their poison-coated weapons. Dante saves her, and the Rabbit gives Dante a glimpse of Hell and its unbearable living conditions before elaborating that he is willing to allow millions of humans to die to save demonkind. Dante refuses to bargain with the Rabbit, defeats his demon army, and duels Cavaliere. The Rabbit unmasks himself, revealing to Mary how her actions led to his creation and that he uses an artificial heart that pumps demon blood into him to stay alive. Dante decapitates Cavaliere and swiftly defeats the Rabbit, who warns Dante that he could have prevented what is to come before leaving Dante with the amulet. Enzo and Baines arrive to witness the aftermath, with Baines declaring the battle as the first of their holy war against Hell.
8	8	"A River of Blood and Fire"	Park So Young	Story by : Adi Shankar and Alex Larsen; Screenplay by : Alex Larsen	April 3, 2025
An injured White Rabbit consumes a surviving demon, causing him to mutate. Anders recovers the Rabbit's portal device, and Baines confronts Mary about her working alongside Dante. The mutated Rabbit, having fused with Force Edge, then massacres Baines' men before engaging Dante and Mary. Enzo comes out of hiding to help, but is stabbed by the Rabbit and dies in Dante's arms. The Rabbit then retrieves the amulet and combines it with Force Edge before impaling Dante with it, creating the Sword of Sparda, and reveals that Vergil is still alive. His plan complete, the barrier between realms dissipates, and demons begin invading Earth. Mary shoots the Rabbit's artificial heart, weakening him, allowing Dante to kill the Rabbit with the Sword of Sparda and repair the barrier, ending the invasion. Dante invites Mary to help search for Vergil, but she subdues and imprisons him. Anders brings the portal device to Baines, who has Anders killed and uses the device to begin the invasion of Hell. Sometime later, the horned demon invades the detention facility built by the Uroboros Corporation and frees its demon occupants to serve Mundus, the king of Hell, and reveals himself to be Vergil.

=== Season 2 (2026) ===
No. overall	No. in season	Title	Directed by	Written by	Original release date
9	1	"The Fallen"	Han Seung Woo	Story by : Adi Shankar; Written by : Alex Larsen and Adi Shankar	May 12, 2026
With the war between Earth and Hell underway, DARKCOM deploys hundreds of soldiers to assault Mundus' castle while Mary infiltrates it alone under the orders of Arius von Enhrenberg to steal the Arcana chalice relic. Mary completes her mission while the demon Jester spies on her, and a furious Mundus massacres all the human soldiers. Vergil meets an agent of the Uroboros Corporation, who informs him that DARKCOM has stolen the chalice before self-immolating. Mary delivers the chalice to Arius, who promotes her to the rank of commander. With all four Arcana relics in his possession, Arius tells Baines that he only needs Vergil's blood to complete his plans. Jester taunts Vergil, making him realize that only a follower of the deposed king, Argosax the Chaos, would seek the Arcana relics to free him. After receiving Mundus' approval, Vergil takes a portal to Earth to retrieve the chalice but is confronted by DARKCOM soldiers using anti-demon bullets. Vergil swiftly dispatches the soldiers and questions the survivors about their leader.
10	2	"Shades"	Park So Young	Story by : Adi Shankar; Written by : Alex Larsen and Adi Shankar	May 12, 2026
Arius and Baines attend an event held by President Jed Hopper, who is facing pressure from the public protesting the war against Hell. Hopper questions Arius regarding the hundreds of soldiers killed in Hell, and Arius threatens the president before learning from his second-in-command Chi that Vergil has liberated the demons held at the Uroboros detention facility. Arius decides to awaken the cryogenically frozen Dante so he can stop Vergil. Dante and Mary reunite, and Mary informs him that Vergil is alive but loyal to Mundus. She explains that Arius plans to use Vergil's blood to open a portal to Hell and kill Mundus using the Arcana relics. Dante is then outfitted with his sword and new pistols. Vergil appears on national television as Hell's ambassador and exposes Hopper and Arius with security footage of demons being tortured and imprisoned at the Uroboros detention facility. Hopper then calls Vergil and offers to negotiate. Mary discovers footage of the demon refugees she helped being executed and realizes that Baines was responsible. Vergil heads to DARKCOM's headquarters and Dante leaves to confront him.
11	3	"The Panther, the Lion, the Wolf"	Han Seung Woo	Story by : Adi Shankar; Written by : Alex Larsen	May 12, 2026
In a series of flashbacks, a young Vergil becomes jealous of Dante and his abilities. A group of demons serving Argosax later attacks their home, and Vergil witnesses his mother's death before he is captured and tortured. Vergil is eventually freed and brought to Mundus, who agrees to mentor Vergil and help him harness his abilities. In the present, Dante and Vergil finally meet and engage in a duel. Vergil explains that he was ordered by Mundus to help the White Rabbit with his plans and has trained for years to fulfill their father's legacy. Dante tries to convince his brother to betray Mundus, but Vergil blames Dante for their mother's death and impales him on his own sword. Vergil enters DARKCOM's headquarters and reveals that Hopper betrayed Arius and Baines by telling him where the chalice was being kept. Mary then abandons Baines and leaves to help the injured Dante. Vergil deduces that Arius is loyal to Argosax, and after Arius absorbs the chalice's power, he and Vergil attack each other.
12	4	"A Pit of Serpents"	Han Seung Woo	Story by : Adi Shankar; Written by : Adi Shankar, Keely Macdonald, and Alex Larsen	May 12, 2026
In a flashback, Mundus teaches a teenage Vergil to embrace his demonic heritage and reject his human side to become strong. In the present, Arius tells Vergil that he has a spy in Mundus' court and subdues Vergil using the chalice's magic. Mary helps Dante while Arius collects a vial of Vergil's blood. Dante then attacks Arius, freeing Vergil, who severs Arius' arm. Arius and Chi flee through a portal to a remote Uroboros base with Vergil, Dante, and Mary following through another portal. Mary convinces the brothers to work together, and Vergil explains that Arius will free Argosax during an impending hybrid eclipse. Arius creates a cybernetic arm for himself and helps Baines expose Hopper as a traitor, leading to a shootout where the soldier Tom Remington Jr. reluctantly kills the president. Dante, Mary, and Vergil break into the base to steal the other three Arcana relics but are confronted by Chi and an army of failed demon experiments. Vergil sends Dante and Mary through a portal so he can face Arius alone, but Arius teleports him away. Dante saves Mary from being hit by an oncoming truck and reveals that he stole the Arcana medaglia, before they kiss.
13	5	"The Garden of Deadly Sins"	Park So Young	Story by : Adi Shankar; Written by : Alex Larsen	May 12, 2026
In a flashback, Dante and Enzo complete a job for their client, Professor Lucan. He shows them how he learned to wield demonic powers and offers to mentor Dante, who declines. In the present, Dante and Mary head to Lucan's mansion, hoping that he is powerful enough to destroy the medaglia. Lucan agrees to help and creates fake duplicates of the medaglia around the world to make it harder for Arius to track down. He then begins a ritual to destroy the medaglia while Dante and Mary spend time with Mattie, Lucan's granddaughter. Afterwards, the two discuss their motivations to keep fighting and kiss. Several hours later, as Lucan is close to finishing his ritual, an army of Chi's clones storms the mansion. Chi and her army assume their demon forms and nearly overwhelm Dante and Mary, until Dante assumes his own demon form. Realizing that Mary is Dante's weakness, Chi seemingly kills her, and an enraged Dante is defeated. Arius then takes Mattie captive, forcing Lucan to stop his ritual. Lucan gives up the medaglia, and Chi kills him before Arius teleports Mattie away as Dante loses consciousness.
14	6	"Purgatorio"	Park So Young	Story by : Adi Shankar; Written by : Adi Shankar, Keely Macdonald, and Alex Larsen	May 12, 2026
In a flashback, a teenage Mary kills a demon, and Baines recruits her to join DARKCOM. In the present, Baines recovers Mary and uses Arius' technology to heal her. Mary tries to convince Baines that if Arius frees Argosax, it will result in millions of casualties, but Baines remains convinced that Arius' plan is God's will. He shows Mary footage of her father alive before leaving to attend a gala to celebrate the hybrid eclipse. Arius tries to convince a captive Dante to serve Argosax. He shows Dante a series of visions that include Mundus overthrowing Argosax and Arius spending six centuries recovering the first three Arcana relics. Arius then drains Dante's blood to use as an energy source to help revive Argosax. Meanwhile, Vergil finds himself in the Trismagia dimension and saves Mattie from a group of demons. They then confront the Trismagia together. Baines questions Arius about his plans, and when Baines demands to activate the Arcana himself, Arius slaughters his men. Having grown disillusioned with DARKCOM, Tom frees Mary, who attempts to stop Arius and is joined by Dante, who escaped captivity. They witness Arius kill Baines before he activates the Arcana and merges with Argosax.
15	7	"Into the City of Woe"	Han Seung Woo	Story by : Adi Shankar; Written by : Adi Shankar, Alex Larsen, and Shakira Pressley	May 12, 2026
Vergil faces the Trismagia, who shows him a vision of Mundus branding demons with the Uroboros and ordering them to attack Dante and Vergil's home. Vergil then escapes the Trismagia dimension with Mattie, but realizes that Arius sent him there so he would turn against Mundus. Argosax begins slaughtering humans to absorb their souls and become stronger. Dante engages Argosax to slow him down, while Mary and Tom attempt to stop Chi from opening a rift to Hell. Vergil stops Argosax from taking Dante's soul and assumes his demon form. Dante momentarily struggles to activate his own demon form until a vision of his mother tells him to embrace his pain and connection with others. The brothers work together to battle Argosax. Mary defeats one of Chi's clones posing as her, only for Mattie to shoot the real Chi, avenging her grandfather. Argosax then absorbs Chi's soul and becomes even more powerful. Realizing they cannot defeat him, Dante tells Mary to open the rift so Mundus can kill Argosax before he reaches full strength. Mary opens the rift, allowing Dante and Vergil to knock Argosax into it and follow him to Hell.
16	8	"Vexilla Regis Prodeunt Inferni"	Park So Young	Story by : Adi Shankar; Written by : Alex Larsen and Adi Shankar	May 12, 2026
In a flashback to the ancient past, Sparda betrays Mundus, leading to a climactic duel. In the present, Dante, Vergil, and Argosax arrive in Hell. Mundus attacks Argosax as Dante and Vergil attempt to close the rift. Mundus rips Arius from Argosax and beheads the former king, and Arius quickly dies from his wounds. Vergil informs Mundus that he knows the truth about his mother's death, and Mundus tries to convince Vergil to remain loyal to him. Mundus tells Dante and Vergil that Sparda betrayed him and created the barrier between realms to stop Mundus from conquering Earth. Dante and Vergil fight over whether the rift should be closed. Vergil defeats his brother and sends him back through the rift to Earth before closing it, infuriating Mundus. Vergil declares that Hell will invade Earth, but with Vergil as its king. Vergil then battles Mundus to avenge his mother. Mary recovers the footage of her father and watches him transform into Jester. With DARKCOM and Uroboros Corporation shut down by the government, Mary sets out to find and kill Jester to avenge her mother. Having landed back on Earth, a critically wounded Dante remembers a happy memory with Vergil and becomes emotional.

== Production ==
=== Development ===
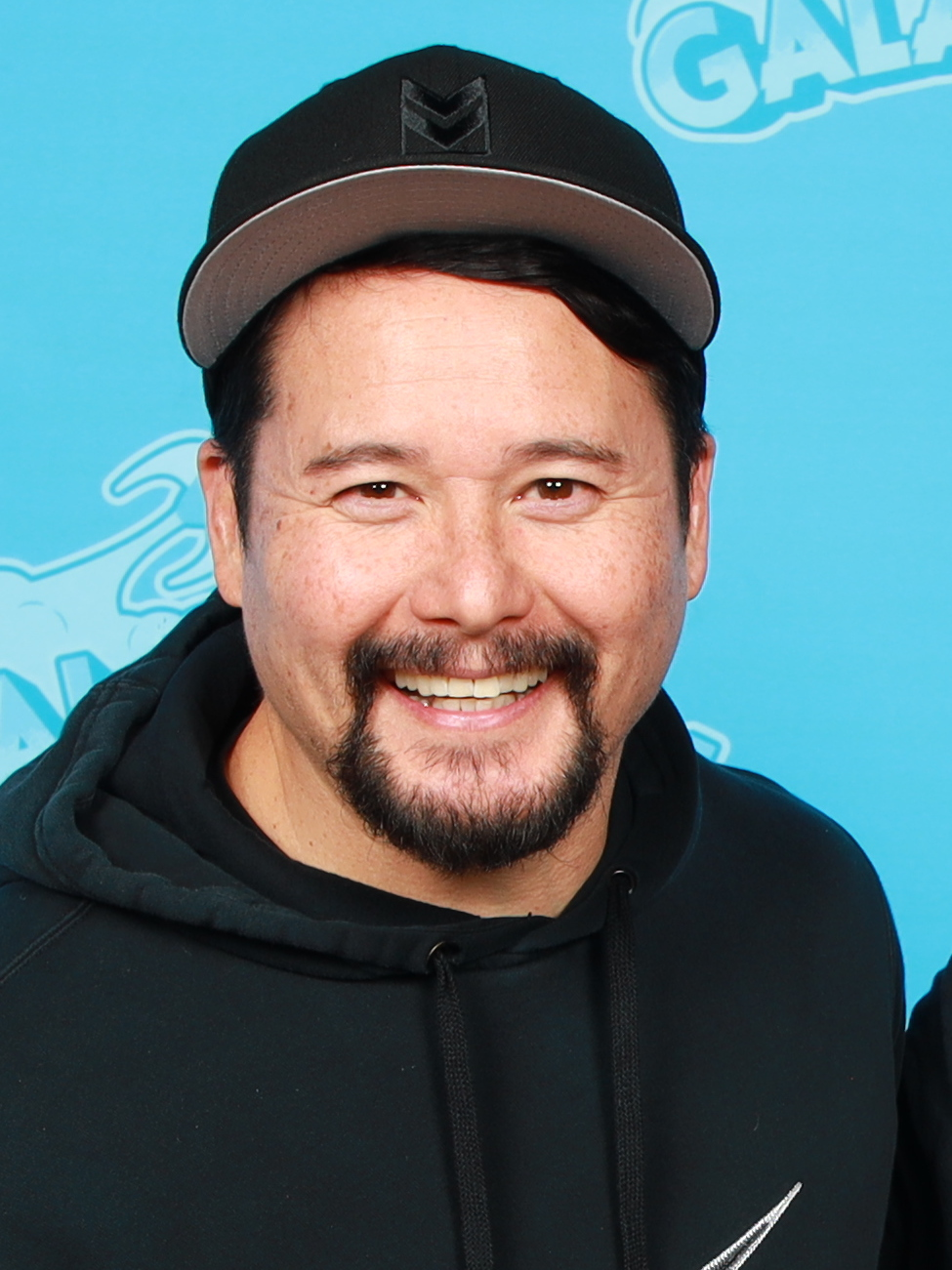
Having previously voiced his nephew Nero in the games, Johnny Yong Bosch voices Dante for the series.

In late 2018, Adi Shankar announced his plans to produce the TV series adaptation of Capcom's Devil May Cry for Netflix. Alex Larsen was hired as a writer for the series which consists of eight episodes. Shankar claims he initially attempted to get the rights to Dino Crisis before being offered Devil May Cry, though Shankar has also stated that he "fought" for the rights rather than being offered them and spent a year negotiating with Capcom before approval in 2018. Shankar claims he was unaware of Devil May Cry 5 prior to acquiring the rights and was "unhappy" when it was revealed as he believed the franchise was dormant at the time, stating "This was my thing. I thought I was bringing this thing back, and so I was like, ‘Oh! This is a modern fucking thing! This is ongoing? Then I should have done Street Fighter."

In September 2023, the first-look teaser was released during Netflix's Drop 01 livestream. Shortly after, Dante's long-time English voice actor, Reuben Langdon, revealed that he was not asked to reprise his role. As a self-proclaimed fan of the series, Adi Shankar said he cosplayed in response to the game, which attracted the company in charge of the games. Shankar brought parallels between Devil May Cry and the comic book Iron Man in terms of popularity and wanted to give it a revision inspired by Christopher Nolan's Dark Knight trilogy. According to Shankar, the series is considered to be part of a shared "Bootleg Multiverse", alongside Castlevania, Castlevania: Nocturne, and Captain Laserhawk: A Blood Dragon Remix.

On April 10, 2025, the series was renewed for a second season. The first episode of the second season, "The Fallen", was dedicated to the memory of actor James Van Der Beek, a mutual friend of Shankar's.

On June 4, 2026, it was announced the series was renewed for a third and final season, with Shankar stating, "This was always Dante's Divine Comedy with guns and a red coat. Season 1 was Inferno. Season 2 was Purgatorio. Season 3 will be Paradiso. These three seasons make up "The Force Edge Saga". Since inception, "The Force Edge Saga" was designed as a movie trilogy disguised as a television series."

=== Casting ===
In September 2024, it was announced that Johnny Yong Bosch would be taking on the role of Dante. Bosch would later mention on a social media post that Langdon, Dante's original voice actor, had quit acting and that Shankar had written Dante with him in mind for the role. Bosch auditioned for the role unaware it was related to Devil May Cry and expressed apprehension when cast due to his previous role in the franchise as Nero. On March 11, 2025, a trailer with additional cast members was revealed with one of them being Kevin Conroy in a posthumous role as William Baines following his death in November 2022. As Conroy had not finished recording all of his dialogue prior to his death, Ian James Corlett was brought in midway through production to take over the role of Baines. In 2023, Tony Todd was cast in an undisclosed role later revealed to be Beowulf for the second season. Following Todd's death in November 2024, he was replaced by James C. Mathis III for the final two episodes of the season.

== Release ==
By September 2023, a first-look teaser trailer was released along with the news that Studio Mir from South Korea would be producing and animating the series. A second teaser trailer was released on September 19, 2024. In January 2025, the intro sequence, which featured the song "Rollin'" by Limp Bizkit, for the series was unveiled. The first season premiered on April 3, 2025. The second season premiered on May 12, 2026.

== Reception ==
Critical response of Devil May Cry
Season	Rotten Tomatoes	Metacritic
1	96% (28 reviews)	75 (8 reviews)
2	100% (16 reviews)	75 (6 reviews)

=== Season 1 ===
On the review aggregator website Rotten Tomatoes, the first season holds an approval rating of 96%, based on 28 reviews. The website's critical consensus reads, "Honoring its source material's flair for the bombastic, Devil May Cry slices and dices its way into the animation medium and makes a bloody memorable first impression." Metacritic, which uses a weighted average, assigned a score of 75 out of 100 based on 8 critic reviews, indicating "generally favorable" reviews.

Aidan Kelley of Collider gave the series a score of 9 out of 10. He dubbed the series "one of the best new animated shows of 2025", comparing it favourably to Shankar's previous work on Castlevania and that it "goes above and beyond to deliver a brilliant animated series that is as thematically rich as it is wildly entertaining." Daniel Kurland of Bloody Disgusting gave the series a score of 4 out of 5. He praised the action sequences and wrote, "There's strong enough artistry behind the action and battle choreography that makes this adaptation a sheer delight." Kurland then commented on the art style by stating, "There are some really creative art direction and stylistic choices that make the series a visual triumph." Kambole Campbell of The A.V. Club gave the series a rating of B−. He noted that "Shankar's spin on Devil May Cry is mostly a fun love letter to the qualities that made it popular" and praised the soundtrack, specifically mentioning its licensed music and the original song "Afterlife" by the rock band Evanescence that plays during the sixth episode, which he described as the "show's best episode." Rendy Jones of RogerEbert.com similarly praised the episode and wrote that "Everything pays off in the sixth episode, a chapter guided by silent visual storytelling that incorporates various animation styles and some aptly fitting needle drops. It is one of the year's best TV episodes to date, a bold move that proves why these studios hire Shankar for their adaptations."

Rafael Motamayor of IGN gave the series a score of 8 out of 10. He concluded his review by stating, "Adi Shankar and Studio Mir craft a fun video-game adaptation that doubles as a deranged, bonkers, and bold homage to and indictment of '00s Americana. If nothing else, it contains some of the best animation you're likely to see this year." Brett Cardaro of CBR gave the series a score of 8 out of 10. He commended the performance of the voice cast, stating that Dante's voice actor Johnny Yong Bosch "is actually the perfect person to play him in the anime" whose "cocky one-liners are often as genuinely entertaining as they are in the games" and that the White Rabbit's voice actor Hoon Lee gave a "standout performance" and was a "surprisingly amazing character." However, Cardaro was critical of the use of CGI animation and noted that "The action is mostly great, but one way it's held back is by the appearances of some of the demons created using CGI. The fight choreography is consistently solid, but the CGI models just don't do it justice." Isaiah Colbert of io9 criticized the depiction of Mary, or "Lady", but praised voice actress Scout Taylor-Compton for her performance and wrote "There's a lot to love about Lady, which is why its so disappointing to witness any sense of poignancy of her quieter contemplative moments or badassery being upended by her cursing so god damn often."

Joshua Fox of Screen Rant was more critical of the series from the declared perspective of a Devil May Cry fan. He commented on the quality of the writing, stating that "my issues with Devil May Cry's writing are compounded by what became the biggest sticking point: the political elements" before elaborating on how the series' commentary on the war on terror was "completely out of place" for the franchise. Fox also noted that the series "doesn't work because of how poorly it portrays old and new characters alike", specifically mentioning how Dante and Mary compare unfavourably to their video game counterparts. David Opie of GamesRadar+ in contrast was critical of the series for being too devoted to the games. Opie rated the series 2.5 out of 5, stating that though the series was able to capture the spirit of the games, "there's little depth beyond that" and that the greatest issue was that the show was "very much stuck in the past, rather than paying homage to it", failing to update the series for modern audiences. Opie was similarly dissatisfied by the series undermining its more positive moments through lacklustre presentation, claiming "it feels like Devil May Cry is trying to convince you of Dante's coolness, rather than simply showing it" and found the action to be a "run-of-the-mill scrimmage" when compared to the choreography of Castlevania. Evie Rivas of In Between Drafts claimed the show is antithetical to the source material, stating it "possesses a nihilistic need to strip the identity of the franchise in favor of a cynical reconstruction" and that "a thick layer of cynicism covers all traces of heart. Irony consumes all sincerity. Adi Shankar's anime adaptation seems to be trying to philosophically murder Devil May Cry." Rivas also criticized the character Mary and her excessive narrative importance and unlikability, describing her as "a theocratic Nazi that eventually builds a concentration camp" while claiming that Shankar's exploration of politics was "in extremely poor taste." Louis Kemner of CBR listed the series among the most disappointing anime of the 2020s, stating that though it "delivered the goods with moments of good animation and solid characterization" it was overshadowed by low quality animation and CGI and how it "deviated from the source material enough to not feel like a true adaptation of the games."

With the announcement in June 2025 of Devil May Cry 5 exceeding 10 million sales and a report from Capcom in September 2025 revealing that the game was the company's best selling game between the period of March to September, many attributed the boosted sales and success over more recent games such as Monster Hunter Wilds as a result of the Netflix show bringing additional attention to the series. In April 2025 Brett Cardaro of CBR claimed in regards to the initial boost in sales "whether fans liked the anime or not, there's no denying that it had a positive impact on the franchise's popularity." Lincoln Carpenter of PC Gamer similarly attributed the boost in sales to the show, though noted that the frequent discounts for the games on Steam were likely another contributing factor. Carpenter's interpretation are corroborated by information released by Capcom on June 13, 2025, which states that the game's price being reduced to 7.99 USD alongside the shows release allowed for increased sales, along with the clarification that the game cleared 10 million sales in March prior to the show's release in April.

=== Season 2 ===
On Rotten Tomatoes, the second season holds an approval rating of 100%, based on 16 reviews. The website's critical consensus reads, "Devil May Cry emboldens its second season by capitalizing on familial drama that further motivates the wondrously crafted action set pieces to stunning effect." Metacritic assigned a score of 75 out of 100 based on 6 critic reviews, indicating "generally favorable" reviews. The season received 4.1 million views on the week of release, a drop of over 20% compared to that of Season 1.

Aidan Kelley of Collider rated the second season as 8 out of 10. He praised the action of the season, stating "every chaotic frame feels like it serves a purpose and amplifies this feast for the senses" and had "enough bloody great spectacle to satisfy more casual fans" but was an overall step down from the first. Kelly noted that Dante was sidelined compared to the side characters, something he noted was also a factor in Season 1 but more egregious due to less interesting characters, stating Arius was not "nearly as compelling" as Hoon Lee's White Rabbit. Rafael Motamayor of IGN was largely positive, scoring the season as 8 out of 10. The character of Vergil was highlighted as "the star of the season" as both an antagonist and a compelling character that added "a darker tone, a compelling emotional story, and some kick-ass fight scenes." Motamayor also criticized the scripts' predictability and noted a lack of delicacy when approaching heavier topics, stating, "Adi Shankar knows to follow the lead of Garth Marenghi's Darkplace when he says that writers who use subtext are all cowards." Grant Hermanns of Screen Rant described the second season as "both an improvement and a downgrade", praising the action and animation as improved from the previous season and the villains as genuine threats, claiming Arius was "the area where it arguably succeeds the most." However, Hermanns had criticism of the presentation of the narrative, feeling the pacing of the season "had more filler" and that it "doesn't quite nail the pacing of its gaming counterpart". Jonathon Wilson of Ready Steady Cut was more critical of the series, scoring the season 3 out of 5 and stating that there wasn't enough to "stop the whole thing from feeling tedious after a while." Wilson disparaged the season for sacrificing casual audiences to appeal to the existing fans of the franchise, such as the inclusion of notable iconography that was "clearly intended to elicit a response to those in the know but won't mean a thing to those who aren't" yet also believing it wouldn't appeal to hardcore fans and was "bound to annoy plenty of them in Season 2, just like it did the first time around" and that the series as a whole "feels like it's wearing out its welcome a bit already."

Multiple reviews were critical of the soundtrack, with many finding the use of licensed music overbearing and less fitting than in Season 1. Jonathan Wilson claimed that while "the soundtrack is great in isolation," the use of 2000s-era Nu metal "can sometimes feel a little performative, like it's trying to create the impression of being cool and edgy rather than actually being cool and edgy." Grant Hermanns found their usage less impactful, stating they were "a bit of a step-down from season 1's needle drops". Brendan Frye of Comics Gaming Magazine stated that while a fan of bands used like Evanescence and Limp Bizkit "I do not think any show needs a full, uninterrupted use of a song in every episode, especially when it can feel a bit shoehorned in." Isaiah Colbert of Gizmodo stated "I've never witnessed a less cool needle drop of "Bodies" by Drowning Pool — a feat I once thought impossible" and described the underutilization of music from the games as "criminal". Trent Cannon of ThePopverse echoed Colbert's statements claiming "If you cannot deliver a badass moment with Bodies playing over it, then you must be actively trying to be dull."

Joshua Fox of Screen Rant expressed further criticism towards season 2. While complimenting Studio Mir's animation as "genuinely gorgeous" and for taking the antagonists of the maligned Devil May Cry 2 and "get something good out of them", Fox claimed these positive aspects did not outweigh the negatives. Fox lambasted the original characters as "the worst part of season 1, and they only got worse in season 2" and critiqued Dante and Mary being paired romantically, explaining, "with how much time Lady has spent assaulting and manipulating Dante in the anime, their relationship feels outright toxic". Fox labelled Vergil as being "a blatant misunderstanding of the character" that "removes all his subtlety" and "lacks everything that made the original so iconic." Isaiah Colbert of Gizmodo described the season as "an objectively unfaithful video game adaptation and a pitch-perfect parody of Capcom's beloved hack-and-slash series" and "a wild departure from the games—arguably its antithesis at the worst of times and a misread at the best of times" while comparing the season to The Room and The Rise of Skywalker. Trent Cannon of ThePopverse claimed that while he enjoyed the show and was "hooked on its over-the-top silliness of it all", he could not defend the quality of the show. Cannon stated "Devil May Cry Season 2 isn’t good", failing as a tonal continuation of the previous season and was at times "insultingly dumb".

=== Audience response ===
Reception among the existing audience from the games was more mixed. Multiple sources reported issues with the liberties taken with the source material, with Daniel Kurland of CBR noting fans considered it "a disappointment due to how it strays from its source material for the worse." Brett Cardaro of CBR noted multiple criticisms from fans, such as many feeling Dante was sidelined as a protagonist and "too weak" compared to the game counterpart, as well as the political allegory introduced into the series being a "source of ire". Maddy Casale of Decider expressed surprise at the "controversial" reception of the series and the "hate" directed towards the story, characters, and politics, stating "there seems to be a sense of betrayal and anger when it comes to Adi Shankar's direction and decisions." Isaiah Colbert described the second season as "an eight-episode prank played on the game's fans" and noted various criticisms that wouldn't irritate those "who've only experienced the series through the show", such as Dante and Mary's relationship being "like jangling keys in front of a toddler" and noting "the final battle being the cherry on top of none of its heroes winning a battle". Ediz Guner of Game Rant described the series as "a double-edged sword for long-time fans" as while the success of the show brought attention to the franchise during a hiatus between games, the pre-existing fanbase disapproved of the show believing "Netflix has done a bad job at representing the franchise's overall story" meaning that the new audience brought in by the show "are not seeing the franchise at its best."

George Foster of The Gamer details the criticisms towards Dante and Mary, stating fans found Dante "much more carefree and meme-y" that was "much more similar to Deadpool [...] than he is to his character in the games", a comparison also noted by Rafael Motamayor of IGN, while quoting a critical fan as describing Mary as an "unlikeable loser who swears every two seconds". Lucas Simons of Game Rant detailed the criticisms of Dante in relation to season 2, stating "the myriad of secondary characters [...] constantly steal the spotlight" drawing attention to how Mary "[carried] the whole team throughout the entire plot" while Dante was "sidelined and beaten to a pulp for two consecutive seasons". Simons highlighted these flaws were a repetition of Dante's character arc in season 1 and that "going over the same trope to showcase some sort of character growth at the end (which didn't happen in the end) is pointless." These critiques led Simons to question Dante's status as protagonist, explaining that if Shankar intended "to reforge the entire lore of DMC just because he wants other characters to shine" it would alienate the majority of its audience, concluding "what would it be of Devil May Cry without its main character?"

Adi Shankar has also received criticism directly for his involvement in the series. The political commentary in the show has been noted as hypocritical when factoring in Shankar's personal politics, such as his support of Donald Trump and including references to controversial live streamer Asmongold multiple times in the series. Elijah Gonzalez of Polygon noted that "this wouldn't be the first time an artist's work didn't match their actual political beliefs" while Alistair Ryder of Looper stated he couldn't comprehend "how a writer behind such a project could align himself with right-wing values" and expressed empathy towards fans of the games "who are vowing to boycott the show because of its creator's politics." Martin Wood of Game Rant details that in addition to Shankar "echoing far-right rhetoric couched in DmC [sic] lore" Shankars negative reaction to Devil May Cry 5, where he stated he was "actually unhappy" and claimed it undermined his efforts, led to significant backlash. Wood states Shankar's comments resulted in accusations of Shankar "having a savior complex" towards the franchise that led to a "disregard for DmC's [sic] source material". Shubham Chaurasia of FandomWire expressed indignation regarding Shankars comments on Kolkata when marketing the series from the perspective of a city resident for reduced Kolkata to "the poverty he saw through a car window." Chaurasia stated Shankar appealed to "colonizer-approved stereotypes" and a "Western pity narrative", claiming if the show required such methods for marketing that "maybe the show isn’t as bold or visionary as it pretends to be."

With the release of season 2, Netflix released merchandise associated with the series, but pulled a t-shirt from their store after fan backlash over the misspelling of Vergil as "Virgil". George Foster described the situation as "leaving fans in frankly valid disbelief" for making the error in official merchandise "despite [Vergil] being one of the most important characters of both the new season and the actual games". Brett Cardaro, who had previously defended the series, stated that this error "accidently proved all the naysayers [...] completely right" and labelled it as both an "understandable" yet "grave mistake that has forever damaged whatever credibility Netflix had left with those diehard Devil May Cry fans". While dismissing criticisms of the show, Cardaro conceded that "Netflix as a company is clearly uninformed about Devil May Cry" and that the error "won't do Netflix any favors in arguing that it actually is paying close attention to detail when it comes to this series."

=== Accolades ===
Awards and nominations for Devil May Cry
Year	Award	Category	Recipient(s)	Result	Ref.
2025	Annecy International Animation Film Festival	Best TV Production	Devil May Cry	Nominated	
2025	Hollywood Music in Media Awards	Best Original Song in a TV Show/Limited Series	Amy Lee and Alex Seaver (for "Afterlife")	Nominated	
2025	The Game Awards	Best Adaptation	Devil May Cry	Nominated	
2026	Annie Awards	Outstanding Achievement for Music in an Animated Television/Broadcast Production	Power Glove, Alex Seaver (for "The First Circle")	Nominated	
