= Tsu Surf =

American rapper

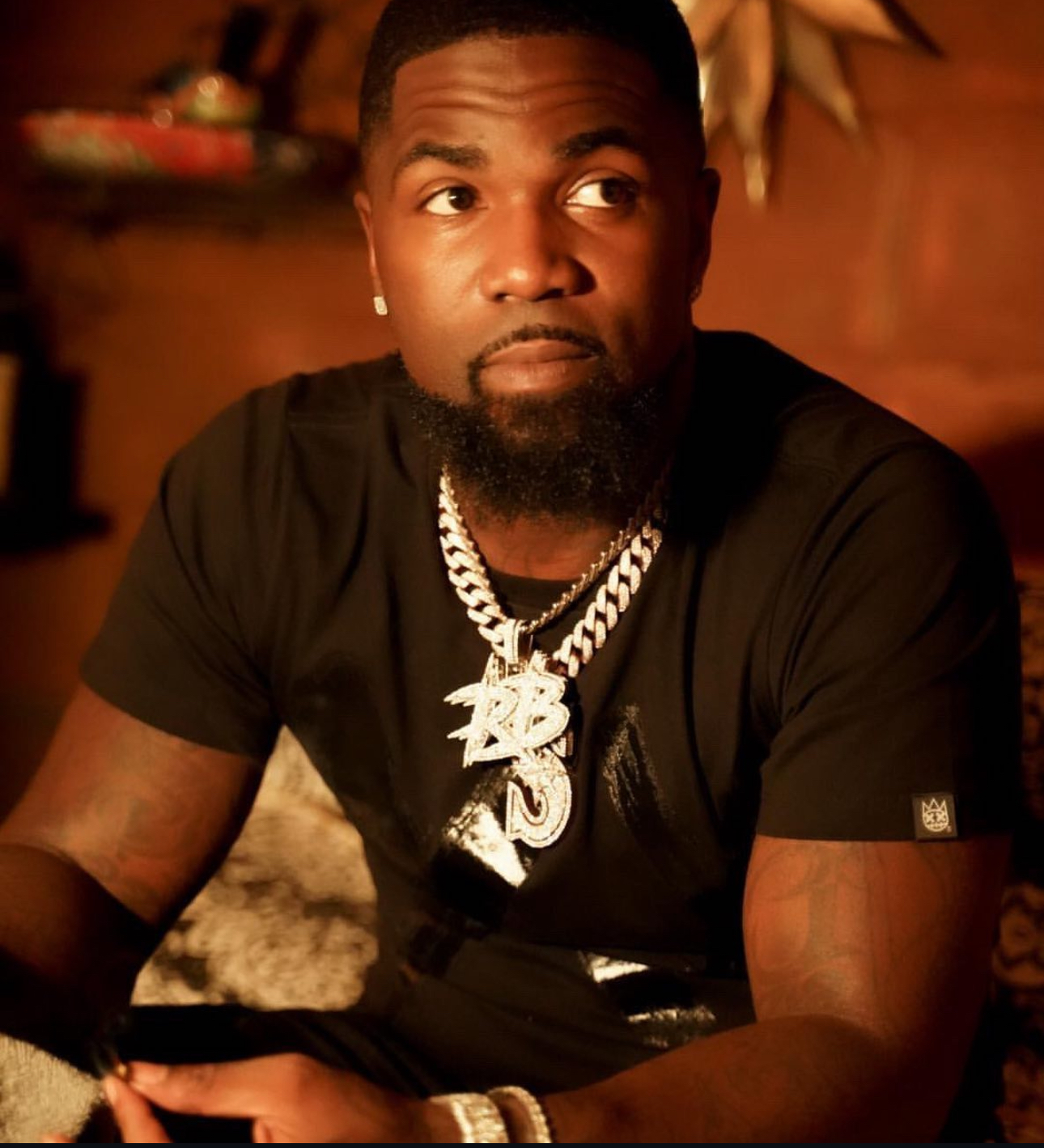
- Tsu Surf in 2021

Background information
- Born: Rahjon Cox; January 15, 1990 (age 36); Newark, New Jersey, U.S.
- Genre: Hip-hop
- Occupations: Songwriter; rapper; entrepreneur
- Website: tsusurfreport.com

Tsu Surf (born Rahjon Cox; January 15, 1990) is an American rapper and songwriter. He first gained attention within the battle rap scene during the pioneering stages of Ultimate Rap League (URL) and is known for his intense performances, frequently appearing on lists of the greatest battle rappers of all time. Known for his aggressive style and introspective storytelling, Tsu Surf is also known for his solo music career, releasing critically noted projects such as MSYKM (Make Sure You Kill Me) and Disparu. His 2015 mixtape Newark peaked at No. 40 on the Billboard Heatseekers Albums chart, and in 2019, Billboard named Surf as one of the emerging artists contributing to the rise of Newark’s hip hop scene. MSYKM featured collaborations with artists like G Herbo, Mozzy, and Jim Jones, while Disparu included guest appearances from Remy Ma, Lady London, and Jim Jones. Surf is also known for his activism, notably participating in Black Lives Matter demonstrations in Newark following the murder of George Floyd.

In October 2022, Tsu Surf was arrested on federal RICO charges. In November 2023, Tsu Surf was sentenced to five years in federal prison for RICO charges. Following his 2022 arrest and 2023 sentencing, Surf received public support from fellow artists and entertainers. During the 2023 MTV Video Music Awards, Wyclef Jean gave a shoutout to Surf, calling for his release, while introducing a performance by Shakira, drawing national attention to Surf’s legal case. In 2025, on his birthday, Tsu Surf launched a website called "Tsu Surf Report" while in prison to stay connected with his fans while incarcerated.

== Music career ==
Tsu Surf has developed a parallel career in music alongside his battle rap acclaim, releasing several mixtapes and studio projects that have garnered attention within the hip hop community. In 2013, he released the single "Broken Dreams", featuring collaborations with Ab-Soul and the late Fred the Godson. The song received editorial coverage from Complex.

Later in 2014, Surf was featured in a BET Hip Hop Awards Cypher alongside fellow battle rappers T-Rex, Goodz, and Rain 910, with Smack White hosting.

In 2015, Surf released the mixtape Newark, a tribute to his hometown. The project received editorial coverage from Vibe magazine. Newark peaked at number 40 on the Billboard Heatseekers Albums chart, becoming his first work to enter a national music chart.

In 2020, Surf released the album MSYKM (Make Sure You Kill Me), featuring guest appearances from notable artists including G Herbo, Mozzy, and Jim Jones.

In 2022, Surf was announced as a performer at Rolling Loud New York, one of the largest hip hop festivals in the United States. Surf performed on the same day as artists such as Future, 21 Savage, and Pusha T. In April 2025, while still serving his sentence, Surf appeared on Mozzy’s album Intrusive Thoughts on the single "Free Surf", recorded via prison phone and released with an official visualizer, marking his first musical output since the 2023 sentencing.

== Legal issues ==
In October 2022, Tsu Surf was arrested by federal authorities in New Jersey on charges related to a racketeering conspiracy under the Racketeer Influenced and Corrupt Organizations Act (RICO). Members of the U.S. Marshals Service New York/New Jersey Regional Fugitive Task Force apprehended him at a residence in Jersey City after a brief standoff. Following his arrest, Surf was held at the Essex County Jail as his case proceeded through the federal court system. At the time of his initial court appearance, the presiding judge noted that Surf did not qualify for a court-appointed attorney due to his income level.

In November 2023, Surf was sentenced to five years in federal prison following a conviction for racketeering and firearms charges. Surf pleaded guilty to charges related to his role in a racketeering conspiracy and the possession of firearms as a convicted felon. His sentencing was overseen by U.S. District Judge Susan D. Wigenton in Newark, New Jersey. Alongside his prison sentence, Surf received a three-year supervised release term and was fined $15,000.

Surf was released in April 2026 after 3 years in prison.

== Discography ==
Studio albums and mixtapes

- Tsu'ner Than Later 2.0 (2012)
- TsuMe (2013)
- A New Mood (2014)
- Garden Grillz (2015)
- 2:00 AM (2016)
- Seven 25 (2019)
- Blood Cuzzins (2019)
- MSYKM (2020)
- Until Further Notice (2021)
- DISPARU (2022)

== Battle rap history ==
1. Tsu Surf vs. Torch (11-28-2009)

2. Tsu Surf vs. Regular Weez (12-5-2009)

3. Tsu Surf vs. Yung Ill (2-6-2010)

4. Tsu Surf vs. DNA (3-27-2010)

5. X-Factor vs. Tsu Surf (3-27-2011)

6. Tsu Surf vs. K-Shine (8-7-2011)

7. Tsu Surf vs. Big T (12-4-2011)

8. Tsu Surf vs. Brixx Belevedere (2-18-2012)

9. Conceited vs. Tsu Surf (12-9-2012)

10. Hollow Da Don vs. Tsu Surf (6-23-2013)

11. Tsu Surf vs. Charlie Clips (12-14-2013)

12. Tsu Surf vs. Calicoe (1-26-2014)

13. Daylyt vs. Tsu Surf (9-18-2014)

14. Tsu Surf vs. Hitman Holla (9-27-2014)

15. Tsu Surf vs. Tay Roc (5-9-2015)

16. Aye Verb vs. Tsu Surf (11-21-2015)

17. Tsu Surf & Tay Roc vs. K-Shine & DNA (3-26-2016)

18. Tsu Surf & Tay Roc vs. K-Shine & DNA (Pt 2) (7-9-2016)

19. Tsu Surf vs. Shotgun Suge (10-23-2016)

20. Tsu Surf vs. T-Rex (10-30-2016)

21. Tsu Surf vs. T-Top (11-20-2016)

22. Tsu Surf vs. Rum Nitty (6-23-2018)

23. Tsu Surf vs. Geechi Gotti (6-8-2019)

24. Tsu Surf vs. Reed Dollaz (12-14-2019)

25. Loaded Lux vs. Tsu Surf (7-11-2020)

26. Tsu Surf vs. 40 B.A.R.R.S (10-17-2020)

27. Tsu Surf vs. John John Da Don (9-25-2021)

28. Tsu Surf vs. Calicoe (Rematch) (10-30-2021)

29. Tsu Surf vs. Nu Jerzey Twork (12-18-2021)

30. Tsu Surf vs. Cortez (5-7-2022)

31. Tsu Surf vs. JC (9-24-2022)
