= FlipTop Battle League =

Rap battle conference in the Philippines

- Industry: Battle rap
- Founded: February 6, 2010; 16 years ago
- Founder: Alaric Yuson
- Headquarters: Cifra Bldg, Boni Avenue, Mandaluyong, Philippines
- Area served: Philippines
- Website: www.fliptop.com.ph

FlipTop Rap Battle League is the first and largest running pro battle conference in the Philippines founded by Alaric Riam Yuson (known as Anygma) in 2010. The league promotes Pinoy hip hop. FlipTop is heavily influenced by the original rap battle leagues in the West founded in 2008 – Grind Time Now (US), King of the Dot (Canada) and Don't Flop (UK), which inspired the creation of FlipTop and other battle leagues around the world. The league also branched out into several divisions after its success. The league is currently under management of a self-produced events and artist management company, FlipTop Kru Corp which was established also by Yuson.

== List of Events ==
=== 2010-2015 ===
2010
Event Name	Date	Venue
Grain Assault	February 6	Quantum Cafe, Makati
Second Sight	March 20	B-Side, Malugay Street, Makati, Metro Manila
Ahon	May 15	Guerrilla Radio, Pasig
Process of Illumination	June 25	Freedom Bar, Anonas, Quezon City
Bwelta Balentong	July 17	Freedom Bar, Anonas, Quezon City
Down N South	September 25	Friday's Super Club, Las Pinas City
2 on 2 (Note: With Dos por Dos matches)	October 16	Tanza, Cavite
Gapo de Gulat	October 29	Music Jam, Olongapo City
Sabong Sumulong	November 12	Texas Cockpit Arena, Marikina
Tectonics	December 4	Katips Bar and Grillery, Katipunan Extension, Quezon City

2011
Event Name	Date	Venue
Grain Assault 2	February 5	Quantum Cafe, Bagtikan corner Kamagong St. Makati
Different Ways	May 28	Durian Bar, Madrazo Compound, Davao City
Ahon 2	July 1–2	Hades Bar, 99 Timog Avenue, Quezon City
FlipTop @ Dutdutan	August 27	World Trade Center, Pasay
Mindfields	September 23	Quimpo Boulevard, Davao City
082 Magnitude	September 24	Quimpo Boulevard, Davao City
Zoning	October 22	Quantum Cafe, Bagtikan Corner Kamagong, Makati
Gapo de Gulat 2	November 5	Jax Comedy Bar, Magsaysay Drive, Olongapo City
Ahon 3	December 10	Katip's Bar, Katipunan Extension, Quezon City
Bara Ko Barako	December 17	Naic Covered Court, Naic, Cavite
FlipTop @ Ilocos Norte	December 28	Centennial Arena, Laoag, Ilocos Norte

2012
Event Name	Date	Venue
Mindfields 2	February 16, 2012	Club Z, Sucat Parañaque
Grain Assault 3	February 25, 2012	Feron Bldg., Kamagong Corner Bagtigkan
Mindfields 3	March 1, 2012	Teno2 Bar, Timog Avenue, Quezon City
Hukuman	March 17, 2012	Orani Gym, Orani, Bataan
Mindfields 4	March 30, 2012	Teno2 Bar, Timog Avenue, Quezon City
Mindfields 5	April 21, 2012	B-Side, Malugay Street, Makati, Metro Manila
Mindfields 6	April 26, 2012	Skarlet Jazz Kticher Bar, Timog Avenue, Quezon City
Zoning 2	May 5,13, 2012	B-Side, Malugay Street, Makati, Metro Manila
Mindfields Mindanao	May 17–18, 2012	Tagum City, Davao del Norte
Different Ways 2	May 19, 2012	GSP Gym, Davao City
Boom Bap Friday	July 6, 2012	B-Side, Malugay Street, Makati, Metro Manila
Dagitay	July 28, 2012	Hayahay Treehouse Bar & Grill, Flores Avenue, Piapi Beach, 6200 Dumaguete City, Negros Oriental
Unibersikulo	August 31, 2012	B-Side, Malugay Street, Makati, Metro Manila
Kataga	September 8, 2012	Kamalig Bar, Rosario, Cavite
Aspakan	October 6, 2012	Party Piknikan, Lazatin Blvd., Villa Victoria, San Fernando City, Pampanga
Ahon 4	November 9–10, 2012	B-Side, Malugay Street, Makati, Metro Manila
Mindfields 7	December 7, 2012	B-Side, Malugay Street, Makati, Metro Manila

2013
Grain Assault 4	February 8, 2013	B-Side, Malugay Street, Makati, Metro Manila
Pakusganay	March 2, 2013	GSP Gym, Davao City
Tectonics 2	April 27, 2013	B-Side, Malugay Street, Makati, Metro Manila
Zoning 3	May 17, 2013	B-Side, Malugay Street, Makati, Metro Manila
Tournament Round 2	July 19–20, 2013	B-Side, Malugay Street, Makati, Metro Manila
Tournament Semis	September 27, 2013	B-Side, Malugay Street, Makati, Metro Manila
082 Magnitude Ikaduha	November 9, 2013	Brgy. Buhangin, Davao City
Unibersikulo 2	December 21, 2013	B-Side, Malugay Street, Makati, Metro Manila

2014
Grain Assault 5	February 7, 2014	B-Side, Malugay Street, Makati, Metro Manila
Ubec Mindfields	February 16, 2014	Gorordo Street, Cebu City
Second Sight 2	April 11, 2014	B-Side, Malugay Street, Makati, Metro Manila
Gubat	April 25, 2014	Cap Center, Osmeña Blvd. Cebu City
Oromata	May 9, 2014	Cagayan de Oro
Kataga 2	June 28, 2014	Imus, Cavite
Aspakan 2	July 19, 2014	Angeles, Pampanga
Zoning 4	August 30, 2014	B-Side, Malugay Street, Makati, Metro Manila
Gubat 2	October 18, 2014	Cap Center, Osmeña Blvd. Cebu City
Mindfields x Rapollo	October 19, 2014	C Cuperclub, Cebu City
Zoning 5	November 8, 2014	Club Z/Barbaric Bar, Dr. A. Santos Avenue, Paranaque City
Ahon 5	December 19–20, 2014	San Juan Gym, San Juan City

2015
Grain Assault 6	February 7, 2015	B-Side, Malugay Street, Makati, Metro Manila
Second Sight 3	March 13, 2015	B-Side, Malugay Street, Makati, Metro Manila
Bwelta Balentong 2	May 30, 2015	B-Side, Malugay Street, Makati, Metro Manila
Mindfields Cebu	June 3, 2015	Lahug, Cebu City
Gubat 3	July 4, 2015	Cap Center, Osmeña Blvd. Cebu City
Process of Illumination 2	August 22, 2015	B-Side, Malugay Street, Makati, Metro Manila
Unibersikulo 3	September 12, 2015	B-Side, Malugay Street, Makati, Metro Manila
Aspakan 3	October 10, 2015	Angeles, Pampanga
Process of Illumination 3	October 23, 2015	Dasmariñas, Cavite
082 Magnitude 3	November 27, 2015	Davao City
Process of Illumination 4	November 28, 2015	Davao City
Ahon 6	December 11–13, 2015	San Juan Gym, San Juan City

Event Name	Date	Venue
Grain Assault 7	February 6, 2016	B-Side, Malugay Street, Makati, Metro Manila
Kataga 3	February 20, 2016	Rosario, Cavite
Process of Illumination 5	March 11, 2016	Cebu City
Gubat 4	March 12, 2016	Cap Center, Osmeña Blvd. Cebu City
Second Sight 4	May 7, 2016	B-Side, Malugay Street, Makati, Metro Manila
Aspakan 4	June 11, 2016	Mabalacat, Pampanga
Mindfields 8	July 15, 2016	Davao City
Pakusganay 2	July 16, 2016	Davao City
Bwelta Balentong 3	September 17, 2016	B-Side, Malugay Street, Makati, Metro Manila
Mindfields x Rapollo 2	September 23, 2016	Bikeyard Cafe, Cebu City
Gubat 5	September 24, 2016	Cap Center, Osmeña Blvd. Cebu City
Mindfields 9	October 24, 2016	Mow's Matalino St., Quezon City
Unibersikulo 4	October 29, 2016	Quantum Cafe, Makati
Ahon 7	December 16–17, 2016	San Juan Gym, San Juan City
Grain Assault 8 (Note: House party celebration. No battle is held.)	February 10, 2017	B-Side, Malugay Street, Makati, Metro Manila
Mindfields 10	February 18, 2017	Mow's, Matalino Street, Quezon City, Metro Manila
Second Sight 5	February 24, 2017	B-Side, Malugay Street, Makati, Metro Manila
Mindfields 11	March 22, 2017	Mow's Matalino St., Quezon City
Unibersikulo 5	March 25, 2017	B-Side, Malugay Street, Makati, Metro Manila
Kabanata (Note: Video upload was on-hold first due to technical problems)	April 8, 2017	Nueva Ecija Colleges Gymnasium, Cabanatuan, Nueva Ecija
Mindfields 12	April 26, 2017	Mow's Matalino St., Quezon City
Mindfields 13	May 5, 2017	Mow's Matalino St., Quezon City; Bikeyard Cafe, Cebu City
Gubat 6	May 6, 2017	Cap Center, Osmeña Blvd. Cebu City
Mindfields 14	May 12, 2017	082 Lokal, Davao City
Pakusganay 3	May 13, 2017	Davao City
Zoning 6	June 16, 2017	B-Side, Malugay Street, Makati, Metro Manila
Bwelta Balentong 4	August 25, 2017	B-Side, Malugay Street, Makati, Metro Manila
Zoning 7	October 13, 2017	B-Side, Malugay Street, Makati, Metro Manila
Aspakan 5	October 20, 2017	Mabalacat, Pampanga
Ahon 8	December 8–9, 2017	Riverside Studios Manila, Valenzuela, Makati, Metro Manila
Second Sight 6	March 16, 2018	B-Side, Malugay Street, Makati, Metro Manila
Zoning 8	June 29, 2018	B-Side, Malugay Street, Makati, Metro Manila
Gubat 7	July 14, 2018	Cap Center, Osmeña Blvd. Cebu City
Pakusganay 4	July 21, 2018	Cap Auditorium, Poblacion District, Davao City
Process of Illumination 6	Visayas: July 13, 2018; Mindanao: July 20, 2018; Metro Manila: August 17, 2018; Central Luzon: September 22, 2018	Visayas: Kukuk's Nest, Gorordo Avenue, Cebu City; Mindanao: 082 Lokal, Torres Street, Davao City; Metro Manila: B-Side, Malugay Street, Makati, Metro Manila; Central Luzon: Chef Bok's Kitchen & KTV Bar, Jasa, Sta. Barbara, Bacolor Pampanga
Bwelta Balentong 5	September 8, 2018	B-Side, Malugay Street, Makati, Metro Manila
Unibersikulo 6	October 20, 2018	Quantum Cafe, Bagtikan corner Kamagong St. Makati
Ahon 9	December 14–15, 2018	Tiu Theater, 2F Cinema Square, Chino Roces Avenue. Makati
Won Minutes	March 22, 2019	Arkipelago, Bagtikan St., Makati
Pakusganay 5	March 30, 2019	Cap Auditorium, Poblacion District, Davao City
Gubat 8	April 13, 2019	Cap Center, Osmeña Blvd. Cebu City
Second Sight 7	April 27, 2019	Tiu Theater, 2F Cinema Square, Chino Roces Avenue. Makati
Zoning 2019	June 29, 2019	Tiu Theater, 2F Cinema Square, Chino Roces Avenue. Makati
Unibersikulo 7	August 10, 2019	Tiu Theater, 2F Cinema Square, Chino Roces Avenue. Makati
Won Minutes	August 23, 2019	Laysa's BBQ Grill, Bonifacio Street, Davao City
Pakusganay 6	August 24, 2019	Muzikhaven, Prime Square, Davao City
Won Minutes	September 27, 2019	Azul Tuslob Buwa, Gororo Avenue, Cebu City
Gubat 9	September 28, 2019	Cap Center, Osmeña Blvd. Cebu City
Bwelta Balentong 6	October 12, 2019	Tiu Theater, 2F Cinema Square, Chino Roces Avenue. Makati
Ahon 10	December 13–14, 2019	Tiu Theater, 2F Cinema Square, Chino Roces Avenue. Makati
The FlipTop Festival	February 7–8, 2020	Aseana City Concert Grounds, Paranaque City
Zoning 10	July 2020	D' mention, Buhay Pa Din City (FlipTop office, Mandaluyong)
Buwelta Balentong 7	October 2020	D' mention, Buhay Pa Din City (FlipTop office, Mandaluyong)
Ahon 11	October 2020	D' mention, Buhay Pa Din City (Fliptop office, Mandaluyong)
Grain Assault 11	May 2021	D' mention, Buhay Pa Din City (Fliptop office, Mandaluyong)
Second Sight 9	June 2021	D' mention, Buhay Pa Din City (Fliptop office, Mandaluyong)
Zoning 11	June 2021	D' mention, Buhay Pa Din City (Fliptop office, Mandaluyong)
Bwelta Balentong 8	June 2021	D' mention, Buhay Pa Din City (Fliptop office, Mandaluyong)
Zoning 12	July 2021	D' mention, Buhay Pa Din City (Fliptop office, Mandaluyong)
Unibersikulo 9	September 2021	D' mention, Buhay Pa Din City (Fliptop office, Mandaluyong)
Zoning 13	October 2021	D' mention, Buhay Pa Din City (Fliptop office, Mandaluyong)
Unibersikulo 10	November 2021	D' mention, Buhay Pa Din City (Fliptop office, Mandaluyong)
Ahon 12	December 2021	D' mention, Buhay Pa Din City (Fliptop office, Mandaluyong)
Second Sight 10	April 2022	TIU Theater, Makati City, Metro Manila, Philippines
Gubat 10	May 2022	Hoops Dome, Lapu-Lapu City, Cebu, Philippines
Zoning 14	July 2022	TIU Theater, Makati Central Square, Makati City, Philippines
Bwelta Balentong 9	September 2022	TIU Theater, Makati Central Square, Makati City, Philippines
Unibersikulo 11	October 2022	TIU Theater, Makati Central Square, Makati City, Philippines
Zoning 15	November 2022	TIU Theater, Makati Central Square, Makati City, Philippines
Ahon 13	December 2022	FlipTop Warehouse, Maclang corner P. Guevarra, San Juan City. Philippines
Second Sight 11	March 2023	TIU Theater, Makati Central Square, Makati City, Philippines
Gubat 11	March 2023	Mandaue Sports Complex, Mandaue City. Philippines
Won Minutes Visayas	April 2023	Bar and Cocktail Lounge, Panagdait, Kasambagan, Mabolo, Cebu City. Philippines
Pakusganay 7	June 2023	The Dome, NCCC Mall VP, J.P. Laurel Avenue, Poblacion District, Davao City. Philippines
Won Minutes Mindanao	June 2023	Davao City. Philippines
Zoning 16	July 2023	TIU Theater, Makati Central Square, Makati City. Philippines
Gubat 12	September 2023	Mariner's Court, Legaspi Ext., Cebu City, Cebu. Philippines.; Mandaue Sports Complex, Mandaue City, Cebu. Philippines.
Bwelta Balentong 10	October 2023	TIU Theater, Makati Central Square, Makati City, Philippines
Ahon 14	December 2023	TIU Theater, Makati Central Square, Makati City, Philippines
Won Minutes Luzon	February 2024	88Fryer, Panay Ave., corner Timog Ave., Quezon City, Philippines
Second Sight 12	March 2024	TIU Theater, Makati Central Square, Makati City, Philippines
Gubat 13	April 2024	Basketball Court, Legaspi Ext., Cebu City, Cebu. Philippines
Mindfields x Rapollo 3: Won Minutes Visayas	April 2024	Azul Tuslub Buwa, Gorordo Avenue, Cebu City, Philippines

== Isabuhay Tournament winners ==
Year	Winner	Finalist	Semi-finalists	Eliminated in round 2	Eliminated in round 1
2013	Aklas	BLKD	Sinio; Flict-G	Jade Wunn; Andy G; Spade/Goriong Talas; Rudic	JLem; Ranieboy; Batang Rebelde; Flip; Gin; Sparo; Asero; Juan Lazy
2014	Batas	Melchrist	Rapido; Kris Delano	Rudic; Hizuka; Elbiz; Prosecutor Billy	Dopee; Nikki; Spade; Silent Effect; Maxford; Aklas; Nico; Notorious
2015	Batas	Romano	Shernan; Dello	Sayadd; BLKD; Pistolero; Sak Maestro	Andy G; Kregga; Rapido; Thike; M Zhayt; Shehyee; Badang; Fongger (Note: Did not show up and was automatically eliminated.)
2016	Loonie	Plazma	Tipsy D; Asser	G-Clown; J-King; M Zhayt; Rapido	Badang; Frooz; Flict-G; Pistolero; KJap; Smugglaz; Aklas; Romano
2017	Mhot	Sur Henyo	Apekz; Fukuda	Spade/Goriong Talas; Sayadd; Batas; Asser	Plazma; Dhuski; Badang; Omar Baliw; Batang Rebelde; Hearty; Sixth Threat; Rudic
2018	Shehyee	Pistolero	Fukuda; Abra	J-King; Batas; Plazma; Invictus	Lhipkram; Sayadd; Maxford; Jonas; Aelekz; Batang Rebelde; Poison13; Marshall Bonifacio
2019	Sixth Threat	Apekz	Poison13; G-Clown	Lanzeta; BLKD; Asser; Lhipkram	Rudic; Sayadd; Dosage; Marshall Bonifacio; Hazky; Jonas; Goriong Talas; J-Blaque
2020	M-Zhayt	Lhipkram	Luxuria; Jonas	Batas; GL; Onlison; Kregga	J-King; Frooz; Yuniko; Chris Ace; Gameboy; Pareng Elbiz; Marshall Bonifacio; Lanzeta
2021	J-Blaque	Goriong Talas	Apekz; Zend Luke	Mastafeat; Vitrum; G-Clown; Harlem	Bagsik; Illtimate; Onaks; CNine; LilStrocks; JR Zero; Righteous1; K-Ram
2022	Pistolero	Luxuria	Goriong Talas; Poison13	JDee; Castillo; Harlem; Elbiz	Zaki; Pen Pluma; CNine; Plaridhel; Zaito; C-Quence; SlockOne; Zend Luke
2023	Invictus	Hazky	JDee; Plaridhel	Sak Maestro; Poison13; Zaito; Illtimate	Asser; C-Quence; Bagsik; Prince Rhyme; J-King; Castillo; G-Clown; Sayadd
2024	GL	Vitrum	SlockOne; EJ Power	Sur Henyo; G-Clown; Romano; Ruffian	JDee; Poison 13; Apoc; Class G; Rapido; Marshall Bonifacio; 3rdy; Jr Zero
2025	Katana	Lhipkram	Saint Ice; Ban	Carlito; K-Ram; Zaki; Cripli	3rdy; Aubrey; Jonas; Manda Baliw; Article Clipted; Kenzer; Zend Luke; Empithri

== Dos Por Dos Winners ==
Year	Winners	Finalists	Semi-finalists	Eliminated in round 2	Eliminated in round 1
2012	Shehyee/Smugglaz	Juan Lazy/Harlem	Loonie/Abra; Papew/Melchrist	Frooz/Elbiz; Crazymix/Bassilyo; Apoc/Dhictah; Aklas/Sayadd	Jaytee/Stielo; Flipzydot1/Supreme; Tipsy D/Third D; Spade/Reddblot; Nico/Kamandag; Rapido/Batang Rebelde; Snob/Dopee; Maxford/G-Spot
2013	Frooz/Elbiz	Crazymix/Bassilyo	Rapido/Icaruz; Tipsy D/Third D	Abra/Apekz; Dopee/Snob; Target/J-Skeelz; G-Spot/Mac-T; Yelshawn/Bogchick	Ice Rocks/Kris Delano; Maxford/Malupet; Fongger/WBeat; Mocks Wun/Verse1; Righteous1/Negatibo; Thike/G-Clown; Papew/Melchrist
2017	Shernan/M Zhayt	Sinio/Tipsy D	Damsa/Flict-G; Romano/J-King	Crazymix/Bassilyo; Dilim/Sibil; Pricetagg/Kris Delano; Maxford/Snob	Mikidee/Wise Wunn; Cripli/Towpher; Invictus/Lanzeta; Jonas/Lhipkram; Aelekz/Fangs; Pistolero/Prince Rhyme; Thike/Hazky; Zaito/Andy-G
2024	Cygnus/Atoms	Caspher/Hespero	Aubrey/Marichu; Negho Gy/Pamoso		Kenzer/Mimac; Article/Sickreto; Deadline/RG; Jawz/Bisente

== Impact and criticism ==
FlipTop initially gained criticism for its use of strong language, mockery and bullying, prompting the city government of Makati to ban rap battles in the area. As time passed, the events gained acceptance with the help of official FlipTop YouTube channel gaining more than one million subscribers for which they received the Golden Play Button Award, and over two million likes on its Facebook fanpage. Some emcees in the league recently are more focused on line delivery, hyping the audience in the battle, and gimmicks rather than dissing to attack the opponent; emcees also improved their penmanship. After it gained success and reputation via social media, many amateur and other rap battles arose such as Sunugan, Word War, Bolero Rap Battles, Bahay Katay, Flipshop, Flipcap etc. Due to its freestyle and rhymed content, some academics consider it as modern-day "balagtasan" although some rap artists discourage the idea. Some educators consider FlipTop as 21st century Philippine literature. Some emcees involved in FlipTop have gained commercial success like Abra, Dello, Loonie, Smugglaz, Shehyee, and others, which caught media attention. Some lines spoken by the emcees in battles became popular phrases used in the Philippines.

=== Controversies ===
==== Sinio vs. Shehyee aftermath ====
Due to the nature of the league and its mechanics, bashing or shaming emcees' relatives is inevitable during the battle. However, in an undercard match between Sinio and Shehyee during the Ahon 7 event on December 16, 2016, Shehyee threw disrespectful lines against Sinio's wife, Bie Sarmiento, during the battle. This led to Sinio aggressively rebutting Shehyee by dissing the latter's girlfriend, internet sensation Ann Mateo. Their match was uploaded on FlipTop's YouTube channel on February 2, 2017, and went viral with over five million views within four days. Sinio's harsh words about Ann Mateo received mixed reactions, and became a hot topic on social media. Controversy arose when Ann Mateo's mother saw the video and threatened Sinio with a lawsuit. Because of the situation, many netizens bashed Shehyee for being unprofessional for his failure to explain to his girlfriend's mother the mechanics of the league. Sinio felt that Shehyee was not to blame and that he understood Ann Mateo's mother's point-of-view. Shehyee tried to help Sinio in addressing the issue with Ann Mateo's mother. Ann Mateo did not share her reaction about the topic.

==== Reading lyrics during the battle ====
When the battle between Pistolero vs Luxuria was uploaded to FlipTop YouTube Channel, viewers noticed Luxuria reading her written lyrics on her smartphone in the middle of the battle instead of memorizing it, raising concerns of unfairness and cheating.

Besides Luxuria, there have been other instances of rappers reading their lyrics. Dopee and his partner Snob was caught in their DosPorDos battle reading their lyrics on a piece of paper for a few seconds. In another instance, rapper LilWeng pulled out an earphone to listen to his verses. Recently, Cripli covered the camcorder lens and read his lines during his battle against Batang Rebelde and managed to get the victory.
