= Kid Twist (rapper) =

Canadian rapper (born 1986)

Alex Larsen (born July 29, 1986), who performs under the pseudonym Kid Twist, is a battle rapper and author. He is known for his humour, rebuttals and hairstyle. He is from Toronto. Kid Twist first gained notoriety in 2007, when he battled at the World Rap Championships. He was the first King of the Dot champion. Kid Twist graduated from York University with a BA in creative writing and is working on the draft of his second novel. He co-wrote the loosely autobiographical film Bodied, from director Joseph Kahn and producer Eminem, which premiered at the 2017 Toronto International Film Festival. At the festival, it won the People's Choice Award: Midnight Madness. In January 2018, it was acquired by YouTube for a theatrical release and distribution.

== Filmography ==
=== Film ===
Year	Title	Director	Notes
2018	Bodied	Joseph Kahn	Co-wrote story with Joseph Kahn

=== Television ===
Year	Title	Notes
2021	Yasuke	Wrote 3 episodes Nominated - 53rd NAACP Image Award for Outstanding Animated Series
2023	Captain Laserhawk: A Blood Dragon Remix	Wrote 3 episodes
2025	Devil May Cry	Wrote 16 episodes
