= Rory Uphold =

American singer-songwriter

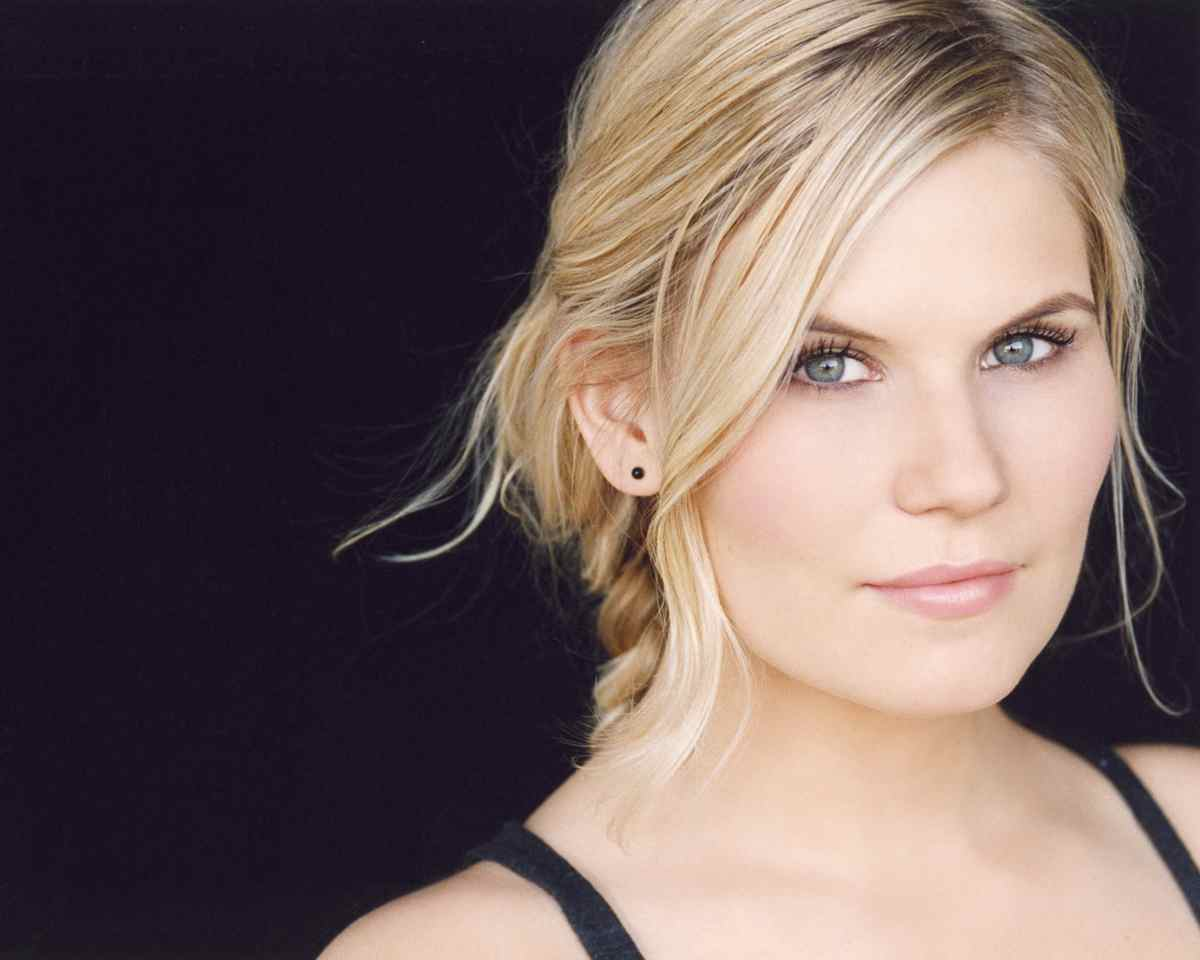
Rory Uphold

Rory Uphold is a Canadian-American singer-songwriter and actress. Her music was played in two movies and in the comedy series "Merri Me."

== Career ==
Uphold began performing at the age of three. She has had her tracks in two movies The Anniversary at Shallow Creek and The Victim and the web comedy series Merri Me. She has teamed up with other artists, including rapper E-40 and pop artist Colby O'Donis.

In 2008, Uphold toured California schools to promote the importance of education. She has also performed at the Six Flags Summer Jam Tour, the Levitt Pavilion Summer Concert Series, and the Queen Mary Independence Day concert with singer Ray J.

Uphold wrote and directed a short film called Safety, starring Ben York Jones.

Uphold stars as the lead actress in the 2017 feature film, Bodied, which premiered at the 2017 Toronto International Film Festival alongside Calum Worthy.

== See also ==
- Ben York Jones
