= Iron Solomon =

American rapper

- Born: April 10, 1984 (age 42)
- Origin: Brooklyn, New York, United States
- Genre: Hip hop
- Label: Duck Down Music Inc.

Iron Solomon is an American battle rapper, producer, and songwriter from New York City. Solomon dropped his debut album "Monster" March 27, 2012 via Duck Down Music Inc. to lackluster reviews and sales.

As a battle rapper, Iron Solomon came to fame in both the freestyle and written eras of battle rap. In the freestyle era, he won the Scribble Jam East qualifier and was a finalist at Scribble Jam 2005 beating NoCanDo and Pass and a Brainstorm finalist in 2004. However, his battle with Jin on Fight Club was his breakout battle. In the written era, on Saturday December 9, 2017, Iron Solomon battled Rum Nitty at SMACK Vol.1. Throughout his career, Solomon has battled Murda Mook, Daylyt, Illmaculate, The Saurus, Jin, E Ness, Dizaster, Charlie Clips, B Magic and others.

His father is film score composer Robby Merkin.
