= Organik (musician) =

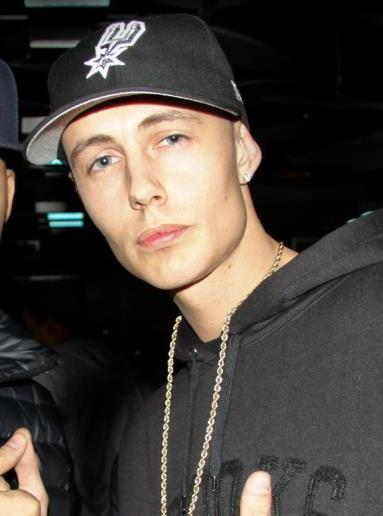
- Organik in 2011

Background information
- Born: Travis Fleetwood; November 20, 1988 (age 37); Bolton, Ontario, Canada
- Genre: Hip hop
- Occupations: Rapper; songwriter
- Years active: 2006–present
- Website: www.kingofthedot.com

Travis Fleetwood (born November 20, 1988), known as Organik, is the founder and part owner of King of the Dot, a battle rap league based in Toronto, Ontario, where he currently resides. Organik founded King of the Dot in 2008. As the founder, CEO, and host of King of the Dot, he has been credited with developing battle rap talent, specializing in booking local talent as well as from other battle leagues.

Organik has won several battle rap competitions, including BET's 2006 and 2008 "Canadian Spring Bling" and "Battle Of The Headz". He is a three-time champion of ChangePromotion’s Battle King Events and also won Toronto's "Proud2BEhBattleMC" event three times.

In 2011, Organik was a judge on the Ultimate MC TV show alongside Royce da 5'9", Sean Price, Planet Asia, and Pharoahe Monch.

On November 5, 2011, he organized a battle event called "Flatline" between battle rappers Dizaster and DNA. Organik co-hosted this event with Canadian hip hop artist Drake, who gave both battlers $750 for taking part. The event featured his signature OVO owl as part of its branding and KOTD's collaboration with Drake.

He previously worked as a steel worker for eight years, quitting in 2014 to run the league full-time.
