= Ultimate Rap League =

American battle rap league

- Industry: Battle rap
- Founded: October 26, 2009
- Founders: Norbes, Troy "Smack" Mitchell, Eric Beasley, Jean "Cheeko" French,
- Headquarters: NYC, New York, United States
- Key people: Smack, E. Beasley, Cheeko, Rain910,NuNu Nellz, Derez, JB, BELIKEIKE, Troy Martin, B. City, Big Terra, Tallest In The Building, Kellz, T.H.E.S.I.S., Billz, DutchKIB, YaBoyClip
- Brands: SMACK/URL, PG
- Divisions: East Coast, Midwest, West Coast
- Website: urltv.tv

The Ultimate Rap League (commonly referred to as SMACK/URL) is a battle rap league based out of New York City owned by acclaimed hip hop promoter Troy "Smack White" Mitchell, Eric Beasley, and Jean "Cheeko" French from Queens, New York City, United States.

Rappers, music executives, DJs and athletes such as Kendrick Lamar, Sean Combs, Busta Rhymes, Drake, Q-Tip, Joe Budden, Cassidy, King Los, Beanie Sigel, Jay-Z, Funkmaster Flex, Kid Capri, Bow Wow, Jadakiss, Lupe Fiasco, Adrien Broner, Kevin Durant, Nick Cannon, Lloyd Banks, French Montana, D.C. Young Fly, Mos Def, and Method Man have shown support towards the league.

== About ==
The league originally grew out of the popular series of street DVDs known as S.M.A.C.K. DVD (an acronym for Street Music, Arts, Culture & Knowledge) that ran between 2002 and 2008. The rap DVDs often feature in-depth interviews and details about up-and-coming rappers' lives. Many DVDs feature a rap battle which was often filmed right on the street, a cappella and without judges. These battles heavily influenced future rap battle leagues and competitions such as MTV's Monday Night Fight Klub, Grind Time Now, Sho-time Battle Rap League, and King of the Dot, setting a new standard for modern day battle rap.

Today, the URL averages up to millions of views on many of their rap battles. They strongly protect their history in the battle rap culture through their slogan, "You Can't Copy Respect", advising battle fans to "follow the innovators, not the imitators". The league has helped provide a platform for many aspiring artists. Rappers such as Charlie Clips, Conceited, Hitman Holla, Chilla Jones, Tsu Surf, Hollow da Don, Aye Verb, Goodz, Calicoe and Big T were all part of the first wave of battlers for the Ultimate Rap League. Many key figures including Smack himself have been featured on BET and XXL Magazine due to their parts in URL's success. Their battles are also commonly debated by battle rap bloggers and promoters, and featured on WorldStarHipHop.com. In May 2019, The URL launched the URLTV.TV App. The subscription based app allows subscribers to, view unreleased and pay-per-view battles along with other original programming. Many contestants battle each other to win the coveted title of "Battler of the Year."
