= King of the Dot =

Rap battle league

King Of The Dot Entertainment
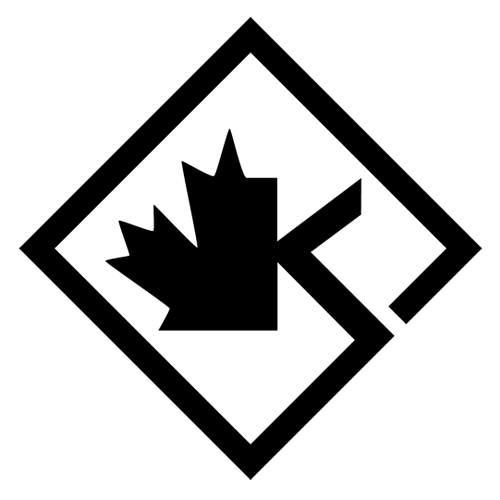
- Industry: Battle rap
- Founded: August 8, 2008
- Founders: Organik, RyanPVP
- Headquarters: Toronto, Ontario, Canada
- Key people: Organik; King Fly; Aspektz; Gully TK; J-Pro; Rego; Chubbs McForty; Nate Sosa; Copasetic
- Brands: KOTD, GZ Battles, PY Battles
- Divisions: Toronto, Vancouver, Detroit, California, Arizona, East Coast USA, UK
- Website: KOTDTV.com

King of The Dot Entertainment, also known as KOTD, is a Canadian rap battle league founded in Toronto, Ontario, Canada in 2008. The company's HQ is based in Toronto, from which it gets its name. Successful battlers such as Pat Stay, Dizaster, Head Ice, Rone, Arsonal, Charron, Math Hoffa, Madchild, and many more have battled in King of the Dot.

== About ==
King of the Dot is hosted by its founder Organik. Past co-hosts have included various hip hop artists, including Drake, Method Man, Raekwon, The Alchemist, MC Hammer, Too $hort, E-40, DJ Skee, Sticky Fingaz, Spider Loc, Reef the Lost Cauze, Slaine, Sabac Red, Sid Wilson, Jus Allah, and more. The league began in August 2008 in an alleyway near Toronto Eaton Centre, and now features over 150 emcees, battling in Toronto, California, United Kingdom, Arizona, Michigan, Massachusetts and Vancouver.

Primarily featuring Canadians and Americans, emcees from countries such as England, Scotland, Australia, Sweden, Norway, Philippines, South Africa, and Russia have all battled in King of the Dot's annual World Domination event. The influence of King of the Dot has spread globally, inspiring the creation of other battle leagues such as FlipTop in the Philippines, Dissneeland in Vietnam, and Versus Battle in Russia.

King of the Dot has three leagues — PY Battles (Try-Outs); GZ Battles (North American stand alone smaller league); and KOTD (worldwide big league).

King of the Dot events have featured all elements of hip hop culture, including a cappella emcee battles, freestyle battles over instrumentals, live performances by hip hop artists, beatboxing, graffiti exhibits, DJing, and breaking.

== Origins ==
Travis Fleetwood, a.k.a. Organik, built a reputation as one of Canada's elite battle emcees, winning title after title, including 4 wins at the well known Toronto-based freestyle competition Proud 2B Eh Battle MC, where he met a local producer/DJ by the name of RyanPVP. The two put together the first event which was initially intended to be a flash mob style event at Yonge-Dundas Square (now Sankofa Square) in downtown Toronto. However, the police presence and private security at the location forced the event to move down the road to an alley beside radio station Flow 93.5. After a few events at that location, they were unable to accommodate the growing crowds, so Organik opted to re-locate to Alexandra Park for the wide open space and gritty location. The crisp visuals and production value, as well as local celebrity guest judges contributed to King of the Dot's rise.

== Format ==
The King Of The Dot battle is usually a set of three rounds. There are varying round times, between 60 seconds and 3 minutes. The rules are not overall that strict and rappers are frequently allowed to stretch beyond the time limits, as was showcased in Dizaster's battle with DNA, co-hosted by Drake.

== Magazine ==
KOTD magazine is available to be read online on the official King of the Dot Entertainment website. There is also an option to order the magazine in hard copy. There have been six issues released to date. The magazine has articles discussing past events, interviews with various rappers and much more.

== Past events ==
In 2010, King of the Dot hosted its first Grand Prix. Kid Twist was the first King of the Dot Champion.

Several major battles events have been hosted by King of the Dot, including World Domination II in August 2011. American rapper Illmaculate defeated Bender during this event, which was featured in Forbes.

On November 5, 2011, King of the Dot hosted Flatline (2011), which featured a battle between rappers Dizaster and DNA. This promo event was co-hosted by Canadian hip hop artist Drake, who put up $3000 of his own money for both rappers .

On July 9, 2012, King Of The Dot hosted Vendetta, which was headlined by the mainstream rapper Canibus battling Dizaster. The battle spurred minor controversy in the Hip-Hop community, when Canibus appeared to forget his lines and pulled out a notepad to read his lyrics from.

Blackout 3 took place on January 26, 2013 and was located at The Guvernment Nightclub in Toronto. Hosted by Organik, Gully T.K., Lush One, Maestro Fresh Wes, Scott Jackson and Drake, KOTD sold out club that night with over 1400 patrons. Dizaster, from Los Angeles, California, was facing Arcane from Hamilton, Ontario, in the title match. This battle was judged by Dax Flow, Yas DCS, Adam Bomb, Knamelis and Shotty Horroh. Sponsors for this event were: Bke Technology, Metro News, Pound for Pound, 682 Records, Guerilla Printing, Marketing Kings, Urbanology Magazine, Think Don't Shoot, Guvernment Nightclub, and Trevor D Custom Jewellery.

Blackout 4 took place on January 25 & 26, 2014. It was the first time that the matches other than the main events, were not released to the public. Instead just the names of the battlers involved were released to the public. Each battler had a custom made introduction played on a big screen to bring them to the stage with. It was at this event that Pat Stay made his first successful title defense against Dizaster to remain KOTD Champion.

== World Domination ==
Event	Main event	Countries competed
World Domination — Canada vs. The World (2010)	Pat Stay vs. Hollohan (Day 1) The Saurus vs. Arcane (Day 2)	(Canada) (United States) (England)
World Domination 2 — North America vs. The World (2011)	Madchild vs. Dirtbag Dan Kid Twist vs. 360 (Day 2)	(Canada) (United States) (England) (Australia) (Norway) (Sweden) (Philippines)
World Domination 3 — Global Supremacy (2012)	Pat Stay vs. Head ICE (Day 1) PoRich vs. Dizaster (Day 2)	(Canada) (United States) (England) (Australia) (Norway) (Sweden) (Philippines)
World Domination 4 — The Olympics of Battle Rap (2013)	Dizaster vs. Arsonal (Day 1) Arcane vs. Pat Stay (Day 2)	(Canada) (United States) (England) (Australia) (South Africa) (Philippines)
World Domination 5 — Global Supremacy (2015)	Shotty Horroh vs. Arsonal (Day 1) Dizaster vs. Dumbfoundead (Day 1) Iron Solomon vs. Daylyt (Day 2) Illmaculate vs. Pat Stay (Day 2)	(Canada) (United States) (England) (Scotland) (South Africa)
World Domination 6 (2016)	Arsonal vs. Cortez (Day 1) Iron Solomon vs. Charlie Clips (Day 1) Pat Stay vs. Serius Jones (Day 2) Rone vs. Caustic (Day 2)	(Canada) (United States) (England) (South Africa) (Australia)
World Domination 7 (2017)	Dizaster vs. Oxxxymiron (Day 1) Iron Solomon vs. Illmaculate (Day 1) Cortez vs. Head I.C.E. (Day 2) Pat Stay vs. Charlie Clips (Day 2)	(Canada) (Russia) (United States) (Australia) (England)
World Domination 8 (2019)	Head ICE vs. Chilla Jones Soul vs. Arsonal	(Canada) (United States) (England) (Scotland)
World Domination 9 (2026)	Dizaster vs. Charron (Day 1) Arsonal vs. Kandi (Day 2)	(Canada) (United States) (England) (Nigeria) (Jamaica)

== Championship history ==
Key
Indicates the current champion

=== King of the Dot World Title ===
Name	From	Event Won (Year)	Successful Title Defenses
Kid Twist	Toronto, Ontario (Canada)	KOTD Toronto Division, Vol. 5 (2009)	Defeated Bartone to become inaugural champion
Hollohan	Dartmouth, Nova Scotia (Canada)	KOTD Toronto Division, Vol. 8 (2009)	1 (vs. Jack Shitt)
The Saurus	Monterey, California (United States)	KOTD Toronto Division, Vol. 14 (2010)	0
Arcane	Hamilton, Ontario (Canada)	World Domination 1 (2010)	0
Bender	Ottawa, Ontario (Canada)	Blackout (2011)	0
Sketch Menace	Calgary, Alberta (Canada)	Doomsday (2011)	0
poRich	Whitby, Ontario (Canada)	Blackout 2 (2012)	1 (vs. PH)
Dizaster	Los Angeles, California (United States)	World Domination 3 (2012)	0
Arcane (2)	Hamilton, Ontario (Canada)	Blackout 3 (2013)	0
Pat Stay	Dartmouth, Nova Scotia (Canada)	World Domination 4 (2013)	3 (vs. Dizaster, Daylyt & Charron)
Illmaculate	Portland, Oregon (United States)	World Domination 5 (2015)	0
Rone	Philadelphia, Pennsylvania (United States)	Blackout 6ix (2016)	1 (vs. Caustic)
Head I.C.E.	Harlem, New York (United States)	Blackout 7 (2017)	1 (vs. Cortez)
Chilla Jones	Boston, Massachusetts (United States)	World Domination 8 (2019)	0
Real Deal	Pittsburgh, Pennsylvania (United States)	Massacre 5 (2019)	3 (vs. Chilla Jones, Charron & Saynt LA)

=== KOTD tournament winners ===
Name	Tournament	Runner up	Prize
Arcane	2010 KOTD Grand Prix	Loe Pesci	$2,000, Grand Prix Trophy and title match
PoRich & Diaz	2011 KOTD 2 vs. 2 Grand Prix	The Saurus & Illmaculate	$5,000
Arcane	2012 KOTD Grand Prix	Chedda Cheese	$5,000 and title match
Dan Da Sick Spitta'	2013 Ground Zero Grand Prix	Step Easy	$1,500 and Ground Zero Championship Chain
Saynt LA	2020 KOTD Grand Prix	Marv Won	$50,000, Grand Prix Championship Belt and title match
Bill Collector	KOTD Series 1	Pass	$100,000
