= Illmaculate =

American rapper

- Also known as: Illmac
- Born: Gregory Poe; February 4, 1986 (age 40); St. Johns, Portland, Oregon
- Origin: Portland, Oregon
- Genres: Hip hop
- Years active: 2001–present
- Labels: Sandpeople Music, Wapikiya Records, Sky Is Ours Media

Gregory Poe (born February 4, 1986), better known by his stage name Illmaculate (a.k.a. Illmac), is an American battle rapper and hip hop artist from St. Johns, Portland, Oregon. He attended Roosevelt High School in Portland.

== Career ==
At age 17, he won the 2004 Scribble Jam freestyle rap competition, making him the youngest winner in the competition's history. He is a member of the Sandpeople group. With rhyme partner The Saurus, he competed in and won the 2006 and 2007 World Rap Championships, and the 2006 Spin the Mic competition.

In 2007, Vibe magazine named him one of the Best MySpace Rappers in America.

His 2007 album The Rain Check Mixtape is hosted by DJ Vlad, and includes appearances by 40 Cal. and Copywrite. Illmaculate also features with Sapient of Debaser in the track "The Truth" on Bliss n Eso's album Flying Colours and on the 'Turn It On Remix' from Justice & Kaos's Turn It On EP.

In 2011, he battled Bender at World Domination II, an event hosted by King of the Dot's Organik.

In April 2012, he performed at the Star Theater in Portland as an opening act for the group Slaughterhouse.

On August 22, 2015, Illmaculate defeated Pat Stay in a title match at KOTD's World Domination 5 event on a 3-2 judges decision, making him the new KOTD Champion. He lost the title the next year to Rone.

== Discography ==
=== Albums ===
- The Rain Check Mixtape (December 25, 2007)
- Police Brutality (April 12, 2009)
- The Green Tape (April 12, 2011)
- Skrill Walton EP (November 1, 2011)
- Skrill Talk LP (April 17, 2012)
- CHRON: Legacy (December 17, 2012)
- Clay Pigeons LP (March 11, 2014)
- Only and Ill (September 18, 2015)
- Still Standing (October 28, 2016)
- The Red Tape (January 1, 2017)
- Only and Ill 2 (May 25, 2018)
- Sprng (June 16, 2020)
- Smmr (September 22, 2020)
- Atmn (January 21, 2021)
- WNTR (December 21, 2025)
