= Battle rap =

Type of rapping

- Other names: Rap battling; clash
- Stylistic origins: Poetry; sound clashes; griots; flyting
- Cultural origins: Early 1980s, United States

Rap battle on the street in Japan, 2017

Battle rap (also known as rap battling, or simply a rap battle) is a type of rapping performed between two or more performers that incorporates boasts, insults, wordplay and disses originating in the African-American community. Battle rap is often performed spontaneously, or freestyled, in live battles known as rap battles, where participants will compete on the same stage to see who has the better verses.

Battle rap was loosely described by 40 Cal, previously a member of American hip hop collective the Diplomats, in the book How to Rap (2009) as an "extracurricular" display of skill, comparing it to the dunk contest in the NBA. Battle rap has been developed into highly organized league events drawing in significant revenue and attention. Mainstream artists such as Diddy, Busta Rhymes, Eminem, Machine Gun Kelly, Drake, Kendrick Lamar, Joe Budden and Cassidy have attended or participated in battles to help increase their popularity. Rap battles are often written and performed to impress crowds with technically inventive rapping, and knowing a wide variety of rapping styles and a wide range of MCs as personal inspirations is recommended. Various MCs have started out writing mostly battle raps and battling other MCs before releasing commercial records.

== History ==
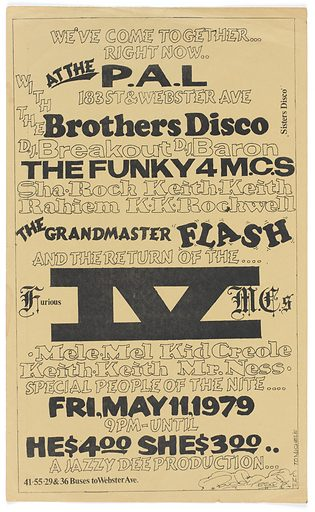
1979 Bronx rap battle flier. Design: Buddy Esquire. Image courtesy of Smithsonian National Museum of African American History and Culture.

Battle rap is believed to have started in the East Coast hip-hop scene in the late 1970s. One of the earliest battles occurred in December 1981, when Kool Moe Dee challenged Busy Bee Starski – Busy Bee Starski's defeat meant that "no longer was an MC just a crowd-pleasing comedian with a slick tongue; he was a commentator and a storyteller" thus, rendering Busy's archaic format of rap obsolete, in favor of a newer style which KRS-One credits as creating a shift in rapping in the documentary Beef.

In the 1980s, battle raps were a popular form of rapping – Big Daddy Kane in the book How to Rap says, "as an MC from the '80s, really your mentality is battle format... your focus was to have a hot rhyme in case you gotta battle someone... not really making a rhyme for a song". Battle rapping is still sometimes closely associated with old school hip-hop – talking about battle rapping, Esoteric says, "a lot of my stuff stems from old school hip-hop, braggadocio ethic".

The New Music Seminar (NMS) is a Music Conference and Festival held annually each June in New York City. The New Music Seminar originally ran from 1980 to 1995. It quickly spawned the MC and DJ Battles for World Supremacy – a fertile showcase for rappers and DJs to make a name for themselves. Participants include a wide variety of very influential rappers such as Busy Bee, Melle Mel, MF Grimm, and Kool G Rap with judges such as Afrika Bambaataa, P Diddy, and many other influential rappers.

Some of the most prominent battles that took place on record are listed in the book, Ego Trip's Book of Rap Lists, and include such battles as the Roxanne Wars (1984–1985), Juice Crew vs. Boogie Down Productions (1986–1988), Kool Moe Dee vs. LL Cool J (1987–1991), MC Serch vs. MC Hammer (1989–1994), Dr. Dre & Snoop Dogg vs. Luke (1992–1993), Common vs. Ice Cube (1994–1996), MC Pervis & Brand New Habits and LL Cool J vs. Canibus (1997–1998) – all of which include memorable battle rap verses.

As hip-hop asserted its presence across the country, MC battles were growing in popularity. One of the early predecessors of the contemporary, more confrontational variation of battle rap was the 1994 face-off between Craig G and Supernatural. The battle happened organically, by virtue of Supernatural calling out Craig G while he was performing. As it so happened, Craig G was in the crowd, and the host invited him to the stage. Craig G won the battle that evening. The two would go on to meet on two other occasions during the 1990s, thereby establishing a place in battle rap as one of the earliest and most exciting sagas in the subculture.

From the late 1990s to the end of the 2000s, freestyle rapping became very popular, with many artists getting attention for new styles, charisma, and witty punchlines in battles such as Scribble Jam and Rocksteady.

Following the resurgence of freestyle battling in the 21st century, competitions began to move to TV shows shown on HBO, BET, and MTV. In addition, Eminem's 2002 movie 8 Mile introduced battle rap to mainstream audiences, generating a renewed interest and popularity in battling.

Starting in the early 2000s, Freestyle Friday is a watered-down battle segment on BET's popular show 106 & Park. Two rappers compete in a freestyle battle before the studio audience and three celebrity judges (the DJ sometimes acts as the 3rd judge). Each competitor alternates freestyling for 30 seconds in each of the two rounds (originally only one round when the segment first began). The rappers are not allowed to use profanities or sexually suggestive lyrics, punishable by disqualification. After the battle, the judges decide the winner, per majority vote.

Eventually, battle rap moved to a format which is now the predominant form of battle rap, where two emcees battle against each other without a beat, trading prewritten verses in three-round battles. The impromptu aspect of battling still exists in the form of rebuttals, which are short rhymes (usually at the beginning of a verse) where an emcee either comments on something about their opponent that was thought up on the spot (for instance, making fun of the shirt they're wearing), or responds to something their opponent said during their previous round. While not as prominent as it once was, the art of rebutting is still respected by many as difficult to do correctly, and a sign of a well-rounded emcee.

In the early 2000s, Troy "Smack" Mitchell of Queens, New York gathered battle rappers, including Serius Jones of New Jersey and Loaded Lux, Murda Mook, and Jae Millz of Harlem. Mitchell recorded the battles and printed and hand-sold the DVDs.

Fight Klub is one of the earliest battle rap leagues and was the only league that aired on TV, airing on MTV2 in 2006. It is hosted by international P. Many of the original rappers on there, such as Arsonal, Jin and Hollow da Don, are now legendary in the battle rap game.

Jump Off TV's World Rap Championships premiered in London 2006, featuring American and British rappers.

In Cuba, freestyle battles often follow organized concerts and juxtapose composed songs with "flowing" lyrics that are relevant to the present situation. Freestyling can allow audience members to integrate into the performance stage. This provides a forum for up-and-coming underground artists to engage in a musical discussion with already prominent underground Cuban rappers. Freestyle battles often turn political when artists incorporate perspectives on social disparities and issues plaguing the Cuban population.

== Battle types ==
A freestyle battle is a contest in which two or more rappers compete or battle each other using improvised lyrics. Each competitor's goal is to "diss" their opponent through clever lyrics. As hip-hop evolved in the early 1980s, MCs gained their fame through live battles with other MCs. Freestyle battles can take place anywhere: on street corners, on stage at a concert, in school, or even online.

The live audience is critical to a battle as each emcee (MC; Master of Ceremonies) must use skill and lyrical ability not only to 'break down' their opponent, but to convince the audience that they are the better rapper. Appointed judges have been used in formal contests, but even when no winner is announced, the rapper who receives the best audience response is viewed as the victor. Currently, talents such as Hollow Da Don use various elements of battle rap that include reciting a written format created through months of preparation mixed with improvised lines as means to attacking his opponent or creating an image of himself as greater than his adversary. This is presented in his battle against Tay Roc in the main event of the Ultimate Rap League's "Summer Madness 6," a battle that the general consensus believes that Hollow Da Don walked away from in victory Summer Madness 6 main event. Fellow battle rap peer Conceited has made a name for himself in this field as well as a more popularized version of competitive rapping on a television platform. While he takes a more humorous approach to his opposition, he still performs with the intention of winning a contest.

A cipher is any collection or gathering of rappers, beatboxers, or breakers forming in a circle in order to perform together – the term has also in recent years come to mean the crowd which forms around the battles, consisting of spectators and onlookers. This group serves partly to encourage competition and partly to enhance the communal aspect of rap battles. The cipher is known for "making or breaking reputations in the hip hop community; if you are able to step into the cipher and tell your story, demonstrating your uniqueness, you might be more accepted". These groups also serve as a way for messages about hip hop styles and knowledge to be spread, through word-of-mouth and encouraging trends in other battles.

== Battle rap leagues ==
Leagues such as Grind Time Now (U.S.), King of the Dot (Canada), and Don't Flop (U.K.), which all started in 2008, with Ultimate Rap League (N.Y.) in 2009, furthered the popularity of battle rap via video hosting website YouTube, brand marketing, and creating divisions across their home nations and beyond.

King of the Dot's Travis Fleetwood, also known as Organik, built a reputation as one of Canada's elite battle emcees with 4 wins at the Toronto-based freestyle competition Proud 2B Eh Battle MC, where he met a local producer/DJ by the name of RyanPVP. They teamed up to put together the first event which was initially intended to be a flash-mob-style event at Yonge–Dundas Square (now Sankofa Square) in downtown Toronto. However, the police presence and private security at the location forced the event to move down the road to an alley beside radio station Flow 93.5. After a few events at that location, they were unable to accommodate the growing crowds, so Organik opted to relocate to Alexandra Park for the wide open space and gritty location. The crisp visuals and production value, as well as local celebrity guest judges, contributed to King of the Dot's rise.

Smack and Ultimate Rap League (URL) are New York-based battle leagues. Rappers included Aye Verb (StreetStatus), Conceited (LionsDen), DNA (Grind Time Now) Hitman Holla (StreetStatus), Tay Roc (LionsDen), Hollow Da Don (Grind Time Now) and many more.

Don't Flop is a popular UK battle rap league founded in 2008, following a controversial judging decision in which co-founder, Eurgh, was denied a place in the finals of a tournament run by the then-dominant battle league, JumpOff. Since then, notable appearances include Rizzle, Illmaculate, Mystro, and Harry Love. Don't Flop came to mainstream UK media attention in 2012 when one of their battles became a viral video, purportedly showing a teacher battling his student. Although the battlers in question, Mark Grist and Blizzard, were not actually a student and a teacher, the narrative was enough to give the league a huge boost in exposure. In 2014, former Don't Flop performers and staff broke away to form King of the Ronalds as a reaction to Don't Flop's move towards a more sanitized version of the product and sponsorship from the likes of Foot Locker. King of the Ronalds presents a more raw ethos, with a philosophy that has much in common with the early punk rock movement. The league markets itself primarily using videos of tense physical confrontations between battlers, something other leagues are keen to distance themselves from.

FlipTop Battle League is an example of a battle rap league in the Philippines.

== In other media ==
- The 2002 film 8 Mile focuses on rap battles in Detroit, specifically Jimmy "B-Rabbit" Smith, played by Detroit native and rapper Eminem. The film also includes rappers Xzibit, Proof, and Obie Trice. The movie is loosely based on Eminem's rise in the Detroit hip-hop scene by performing in rap battle tournaments. The character Future, played by Mekhi Phifer, is loosely based on Proof, also a Detroit native and Eminem's best friend. The Shelter, the setting of most of the battles in the film, is based on a real location in Detroit that Eminem battled at, though the scenes were not filmed at the actual Shelter.
- The 2004 documentary The Battle for L.A.: Footsoldiers, Vol. 1 documents the Los Angeles battle rap scene.
- Starting in 2010, the YouTube series Epic Rap Battles of History features historical figures and/or fictional characters performing battle rap against one another with the audience deciding who won.
- In Tomodachi Life there is a rap battle event which takes place at the fountain between 6:00 to 7:00 PM (7:00 to 8:00 PM in the European Version).
- The 2017 film Bodied created by Joseph Khan and produced by Eminem was written by and stars many battle rappers and people from within the culture. In the film, a progressive graduate student played by Calum Worthy finds success and sparks outrage when his interest in battle rap as a thesis subject turns into a competitive obsession. It premiered at the Toronto Film Festival in 2017.
- The 12th episode of the D4DJ anime series, Rei and Maho organize a rap battle between childhood friends Rinku Aimoto and Muni Ohnaruto in an effort to help them resolve their differences.
- In 2022, Netflix's docu-series Midnight Asia, featured FlipTop Battle League's 10th anniversary festival in its Manila episode.
- Launched in 2017, Japanese multimedia project Hypnosis Mic: Division Rap Battle centres around the story of six fictional rap groups. As one of its components, the franchise brings battle rap to the digital stage, allowing fans to vote online for winners and influence the plot.
- The 2019 Netflix reality television series Rhythm + Flow follows contestants competing to become hip-hop's next big star and features competitors battling each other in rap contests to distinguish themselves to the judges. It was nominated for the 2025 NAACP Image Award for Outstanding Reality Series.

== See also ==
- Answer song
- Diss track
- The Dozens
- Flyting
- Freestyle rap
- Grime
- Stream of consciousness (narrative mode)
- Stream of consciousness (psychology)
- Zajal
