= List of Castlevania characters =

Major characters of the series, as seen in Grimoire of Souls. Clockwise from top right: Shanoa, Simon Belmont, Charlotte Aulin, Soma Cruz, Alucard, and Maria Renard.

Listed below are recurring characters from the Castlevania video games who have appeared in a mainline game more than once.

== Protagonists ==
=== Simon Belmont ===
Simon Belmont (シモン・ベルモンド, Shimon Berumondo; Simon Belmondo in Japan) is the first protagonist to appear in the series. He has appeared in Castlevania, Vampire Killer, Haunted Castle, Castlevania II: Simon's Quest, Super Castlevania IV, Castlevania Chronicles, Castlevania Judgment, and Castlevania: Harmony of Despair, as well as in other games, such as Super Smash Bros. Ultimate.

=== Christopher Belmont ===
Christopher Belmont (クリストファー・ベルモンド, Kurisutofā Berumondo; Christopher Belmondo in Japan) starred in three Castlevania games as a protagonist, two for the Game Boy and one for the Wii. He was a pre-existing character in the Castlevania universe even before the games he starred in were released, as he is mentioned by name in the Japanese manual for the first Famicom Castlevania title, as the last Belmont to have defeated Dracula, one hundred years before Simon. The two Game Boy games were Castlevania: The Adventure and Castlevania II: Belmont's Revenge; in the former, Christopher sets out to defeat Dracula, while in the latter, he has to rescue his son, Soleil Belmont, after he is kidnapped by Count Dracula. He also appears in the Nintendo Wii game Castlevania: The Adventure ReBirth, which is a remake of The Adventure. He also was the protagonist in the limited Castlevania: The Belmont Legacy comic book series released by IDW Publishing.

=== Trevor Belmont ===
Trevor Belmont, known as Ralph C. Belmondo (ラルフ・C・ベルモンド, Rarufu Shī Berumondo) in Japan, appears in Castlevania III: Dracula's Curse, Castlevania: Judgment, Akumajo Dracula Pachislot, and as a supporting character in Castlevania: Curse of Darkness.

In Castlevania III, Trevor defeated Dracula with help from Grant Danasty, Sypha Belnades and Alucard. He later marries Sypha Belnades and has children with her, adding the prodigious magical powers of the Belnades line to the Belmont line, which would be most prominently seen in Juste Belmont.

He later plays a secondary role in Curse of Darkness, where he investigates the rise of Dracula in the region. He confronts the Devil Forgemaster Hector, and although he initially treats Hector with contempt, he aids him in his quest. After Isaac injures him, Julia LaForeze gets to him in time, but he is unable to help in the battle. Meanwhile, Hector succeeds in stopping Isaac and sending Dracula's castle back into the abyss, effectively lifting the curse placed three years prior. In the game, he is unlocked after beating the game with Hector.

He, along with Sypha Belnades and Grant Danasty, later makes a cameo appearance in Castlevania: Symphony of the Night, when zombies impersonate them to antagonize Alucard. These zombies also appear in Castlevania: Portrait of Ruin, as Jonathan Morris and Charlotte Aulin trek through the Nest of Evil.

As shown in Castlevania: Judgment, by the time of Simon Belmont's era, Trevor Belmont is looked up to by his future descendants, along with his wife Sypha, his ally Alucard, and his friend Grant, who are known as the "Greatest Three". This pushes Simon, who is trapped in the Time Rift, to seek them to prove his worthiness. According to the Bradygames Official Guide, Trevor is approximately 185 centimetres (6 ft 1 in) tall.

In the Lords of Shadow series, Trevor is the son of Gabriel and Marie Belmont. He debuts in Mirror of Fate, which reveals that, under orders from Pan, who foresaw Gabriel's turn to darkness, the Brotherhood of Light kept his existence secret from his father, and he was not told of his parentage until adulthood. Shamed by his lineage, he ventures to Dracula's castle to defeat his father and avenge his mother, but falls to Dracula and is impaled by his own combat cross. The Mirror of Fate reveals the truth of his father's circumstances to Trevor, leading him to pity Dracula and reveal his identity as he dies. Horrified, Dracula attempts to revive Trevor by making him drink his blood, but seemingly fails. Never knowing Trevor's true name, Dracula buries him within his castle in a coffin bearing the name "Alucard". Thirty years later, Trevor reawakens as a vampire and takes on the name Alucard, after what was engraved on the coffin. He returns in the sequel Lords of Shadow 2, where he plays an important part in his father's journey of redemption.

Trevor is voiced by Terrence Stone in Curse of Darkness, by Gideon Emery in Judgement, by Michael Turpin in Grimoire of Souls, and by JB Blanc in Belmont's Curse. The Lords of Shadow incarnation of Trevor / Alucard is voiced by Richard Madden in Mirror of Fate and Lords of Shadow 2, while a younger Trevor is voiced by Stuart Campbell in Lords of Shadow 2.

=== Sypha Belnades ===
Sypha Belnades, known in Japan as Sypha Vernandez (サイファ・ヴェルナンデス, Saifa Verunandesu), appears in Castlevania III and Castlevania: Judgment. She is a priestess, although she introduces herself as a vampire hunter to Trevor in Castlevania III's Japanese version, and witch of the church, who uses elemental magic in battle, Sypha hid her gender to become a vampire hunter, and fought for the church to destroy evil, despite her sister witches being hunted down by the church. In Judgment, she went on a journey to confront and destroy Dracula, but ended up in the Time Rift and took it upon herself to defeat those tainted by darkness, regardless of their alignment. After the Time Reaper is defeated, she is returned to her own era and continues her journey to destroy Dracula, but is defeated by his minion, the Cyclops, and imprisoned in stone. She is freed when Trevor Belmont kills the Cyclops, and aids him in his battle against Dracula. After Dracula's death, she and Trevor married, adding her magical aptitude to the Belmont bloodline.

In the manual included with the Japanese Dracula's Curse, it is stated she lost her parents when she was young and was found wandering near a monastery in Wallachia, where she was adopted by the monks there. Judgment elaborates that she belonged to a coven of witches who were executed as a result of Dracula's scheming. Judgment's storyline reveals that Grant had carried a torch for her since their first meeting in Castlevania, but lacked the resolve to confess to her his feelings and let her slip into Trevor Belmont's arms. Despite this, Sypha is said to have missed her friend when he chose to refuse his invitation to her marriage, patching up their friendship only after Grant's return from the Rift. Sypha, Grant and Trevor are known in Belmont history as The Greatest Three, supreme friends and warriors who are an example for their descendants to follow. In Belmont's Curse, Sypha is said to have succumbed to Dracula's curse and died shortly after giving birth to her daughter, Rose.

In Lords of Shadow – Mirror of Fate, Sypha Belmont, née Belnades, is the wife of Trevor and the mother of Simon. She tries to comfort Trevor when he learns of his parents' fate, and sees him off as he ventures forth to battle Dracula. Following Trevor's death, Dracula's forces are unleashed and she is attacked, telling Simon to escape as she is killed by one of Dracula's werewolves. Years later, her soul is found by Simon beneath Dracula's castle, though he is unaware of her identity, and she joins him to protect him on his quest.

Sypha is voiced by Charlotte Emerson in Lords of Shadow – Mirror of Fate and Alejandra Reynoso in Belmont's Curse.

=== Alucard ===
Alucard (アルカード, Arukādo) is the dhampir son of Dracula and a human woman named Lisa. He appears in Castlevania III, Aria of Sorrow, Dawn of Sorrow, Judgment, Legends, and stars in Symphony of the Night. As a reference to the movie Son of Dracula, Alucard is "Dracula" spelled backwards. This is a title Alucard seems to have adopted for himself, as his actual full name is Adrian Fahrenheit Ţepeş. In Castlevania: Aria of Sorrow and Castlevania: Dawn of Sorrow, he assumes the identity of Genya Arikado.

Alucard also appeared in Captain N: The Game Master, voiced by Ian James Corlett.

Alucard appears in Mirror of Fate, the second game in the Lords of Shadow series. It is revealed that this version of Alucard was originally Trevor Belmont, the son of Gabriel and Marie Belmont, before he was turned into a vampire. Trevor grew up not knowing of his true origin until the Brotherhood of Light reveals to him who his parents were. Believing that Dracula murdered his mother in cold blood, he decides to pursue him in hopes of destroying him and bringing peace. During the fight, Trevor is defeated and stabbed with his Combat Cross. As he is dying, through the Mirror of Fate he finally realizes the truth of what happened to Gabriel and feels sorry for him, calling him his father. Dracula learns who Trevor was through the Mirror of Fate, and feeling remorseful for killing his own son, tries to bring him back to life by making him drink his blood, which seemingly fails. After this, Dracula places Trevor in a coffin with the name Alucard, since he never learned his real name. Many years later, Alucard awakens, now with pale white skin, white hair, and glowing orange eyes. He meets up with Dracula and his own son, Simon, and tries to finish what he started, angry that he turned him into a vampire. Dracula asks Alucard to join him in remaking the world and destroying the Brotherhood, but Alucard refuses. Dracula proceeds to attack Simon for being a Belmont, wishing to end the Belmont bloodline due to his hatred of his past life. Alucard and Simon manage to defeat Dracula and part ways as Dracula's castle crumbles.

Alucard also appears as a supporting character in the sequel, Castlevania: Lords of Shadow 2, playing an important role in his father's journey of redemption. He is playable in the DLC Revelations, which takes place shortly before the events of the main game. In the Lords of Shadow series Alucard is voiced by Richard Madden.

=== Richter Belmont ===
Richter Belmont (リヒター・ベルモンド, Rihitā Berumondo; Richter Belmondo) has starred as a protagonist in Castlevania: Rondo of Blood (and its remakes), Symphony of the Night, and Akumajō Dracula: The Medal (an arcade medallion slot game). His first appearance is the main character in Castlevania: Rondo of Blood. In Symphony of the Night, a direct sequel which takes place five years later, he became a brainwashed primary antagonist; however, completing the game unlocks an option to play the entire game as Richter. However, there is an alternate ending to Symphony of the Night that suggests that he was the cause of Dracula's return. He is also playable in an extra mode in Castlevania: Portrait of Ruin.

Hero of the Castlevania: Dracula X games and a major character in Castlevania: Symphony of the Night, Richter had to battle legions of Dracula's monsters to save his love interest Annette. In Symphony of the Night, Richter mysteriously disappears upon investigating Dracula's recently reconstructed castle. It is later revealed that he was brainwashed by Shaft, a dark priest and servant of Dracula. Players will end up facing Richter: physically defeating him will result in the game ending early, whereas freeing him from Shaft's control will continue the game.

In his first two appearances, as well as the prologue for the third, Richter wears a headband and a blue uniform. In Symphony of the Night, only in the Saturn version following the prologue, his hair is noticeably longer and his attire appears more regal, matching Ayami Kojima's redesign of the character (the PlayStation version reuses the Rondo of Blood sprites). He also gains a few new abilities, notably a dash, a slide attack, and a super jump that doubles as an uppercut.

In Portrait of Ruin, Jonathan Morris fights a recreation of Richter (called "Whip's Memory") in a test created by Stella and Loretta Lecarde to unlock the Vampire Killer's full power, as he is the last known Belmont to wield the whip at the time of the game's events. Richter also appears in the game as one of the Five Greatest. Richter appears in the 2018 crossover fighting game Super Smash Bros. Ultimate as a playable character alongside his ancestor Simon, to whom he has a similar set of moves, being labelled as an "echo fighter". Dead Cells: Return to Castlevania features Richter Belmont as a playable character.

In Japanese, Richter is voiced by Jin Horikawa in Castlevania: Rondo of Blood and by Kiyoyuki Yanada in all subsequent appearances with the exception of the 2008 audio drama Akumajō Dracula X: Tsuioku no Yasōkyoku, where he is voiced by Shin-ichiro Miki. In English, Richter is voiced by Scott McCulloch in Castlevania: Symphony of the Night, by David Vincent in Castlevania: The Dracula X Chronicles (including the Symphony of the Night redub), and Super Smash Bros. Ultimate, by Bérenger Dupré in Dead Cells: Return to Castlevania, and by SungWon Cho in Vampire Survivors: Ode to Castlevania.

=== Maria Renard ===
Maria Renard (マリア･ラーネッド, Maria Rāneddo) is a local village girl with the power to control the Four Symbols of Chinese mythology. She appears in the PC Engine video game Akumajō Dracula X: Rondo of Blood (and its remakes Dracula X Chronicles for PSP and Castlevania Dracula X for Super NES), as well as in Symphony of the Night, Castlevania Judgment, and Akumajō Dracula: The Medal. She is a distant blood relative of the Belmont clan (no mention of that connection is to be found in Castlevania: The Dracula X Chronicles, where she is instead said to be the daughter of a local lord). In the Super NES version of Castlevania: Dracula X, she's also said to be the sister of Richter's beloved Annette, a detail that's not alluded to in the other games. She was later adopted by the Belmont family in Castlevania Judgment.

In 1792, Maria's parents were killed, and she was captured, along with several other young women, and taken to Dracula's castle. Richter Belmont saved Maria from Shaft, one of Dracula's servants, who was attempting to cast a spell on her. Once Maria is rescued, she becomes playable and uses various magically enhanced animal attacks for combat. There exists an ending in which, instead of Richter doing it, Maria confronts and defeats the Count. In the introduction sequence to Symphony of the Night (a retelling of the final boss battle in Rondo of Blood), if Richter's health completely runs out, a 12-year-old Maria will appear and amplify Richter with her magic in his effort to defeat Dracula. Judgment further explains that she fought alongside Richter in defeating Dracula and has power that rivals the Belmonts. Unlike Annette, if you fail to save her in Rondo of Blood, you will not face her at the end.

Four years after the defeat of Dracula, Richter vanished. Maria immediately set out to find him. After a year of searching, in 1797, she finally found Castlevania. In the castle she learned that Richter was working in concert with the dark forces. With Maria's help, the half-vampire Alucard was able to break Shaft's hold on Richter and defeat Dracula. Depending on certain player actions in Symphony, the player will receive different endings. In one, Maria will admit to not being able to live without Alucard and go after him. In another, she will resign herself due to the fact that she cannot ease his torment and returns home with Richter.

Maria also appears in Judgment with a more bratty personality. She constantly trips and miscalculates her powerful magics, for comedic effect, and she acts mostly unaware of the Time Rift's nature, for example believing that Simon and Trevor merely stole the Vampire Killer from her friend Richter. She is also seemingly obsessed with her young age and diminutive body, going so far to openly complain against Carmilla and Shanoa for their developed bodies, and claim that Sypha's large breasts are a "gift from God", lashing out to her for suggesting that her beauty may pose a liability in combat.

=== Eric Lecarde ===
Eric Lecarde (エリック・リカード, Erikku Rikādo) appears in Bloodlines, Portrait of Ruin, and Judgment. Born on May 3, 1892, in Segovia, Spain, he uses the Alucard Spear (mistranslated as "Alcarde Spear" in Bloodlines). The spear was created by Alucard to complement the power of the Vampire Killer, and fight alongside the Morris line. When Elizabeth Bartley attempted to revive Dracula, Eric volunteered to fight alongside his friend John Morris in the hunt. However, he had not told John the real reason behind his appetite for vengeance: the Countess turned the love of his life, Gwendolyn, into a vampire.

Years later, Eric set out towards Dracula's Castle to investigate its reappearance, but was slain by the vampire Brauner. Unbeknownst to him, Eric's daughters had followed him into the castle and bore witness to his death, but both were then bitten by Brauner and turned into vampires. Unable to cross into the afterlife, Eric's ghost remained in the castle and was later met by Jonathan Morris and Charlotte Aulin. Initially calling himself "Wind", Eric tested the pair's abilities with various side-quests. After being confronted by Jonathan following a skirmish with Stella, in which a locket holding a photo of him and his daughters was recovered, Eric disclosed his true identity and the full story behind himself, his daughters, and Jonathan's father. Once his daughters are rescued and Brauner and Dracula are both destroyed, Eric appears before his friends and family and gives them one last heartfelt moment together before crossing over into the afterlife.

In Judgment, Eric believed that the spear's potential was greater than the whip, and sought to prove that. While training he found himself in a time rift, having been brought there by Aeon. Eric believed the rift would give him a chance to prove the spear's potential against the Vampire Killer. After the defeat of Galamoth he was returned to his own time (Judgment).

=== Cornell ===
Cornell (コーネル, Kōneru), also known as "Blue Crescent Moon", is a werewolf seen in both Castlevania: Legacy of Darkness and Castlevania Judgment. He is a member of a warrior clan cursed to turn into beastmen. He is the only member of his clan who had the ability to control his change. He was the only one of his brethren who refused to join the forces of Dracula. He honed his skills in the hopes of finding a cure for his clan and to protect his sister Ada. One day while out training he found himself unable to control his powers and was stuck in beast form (Castlevania Judgment). He encountered Aeon, a time traveler, who told him he had entered a time rift. Aeon challenged him, and told him the time rift would let him learn more about the nature of the curse. After encountering several champions from different eras, he learns from Camilla and Death that they still need him, and is told that there is a possibility of a cure for him (though he doesn't trust them). After the defeat of the Time Reaper, Cornell was returned to his own era, 1844. He returned to find his village in flame, and his sister Ada kidnapped. He then journeyed after the kidnappers to save his sister. He discovered that Dracula's castle had risen again, and that his fellow man-beast Ortega had kidnapped his sister. During his battles he saves the young Henry Oldrey, and later defeats Ortega. He learned from Ortega, that Death, Gilles De Rais, and Actrise had plotted the kidnapping of Ada to empower a newly raised Dracula. Dracula later reveals to the audience that his sister is not a blood relative. Cornell fights Dracula to save her causing Dracula to be pulled into a vortex of energy. Dracula traps Cornell with his last power and tries to take Ada with him. The beast within Cornell freed itself from his body and saves Ada, but is captured and pulled into the vortex by Dracula. Cornell had become fully human, and was able to live the rest of a normal life with Ada (Legacy of Darkness).

According to IGA, "I believe many people did not expect to see Cornell. I really wanted to include a beast man type character, so I picked him."

He is voiced by John Nuzzo (Legacy of Darkness).

A new version of Cornell appears in Lords of Shadow, voiced by Richard Ridings. He is the Dark Lord of the Lycans and the first Lords of Shadow that Gabriel encounters.

=== Soma Cruz ===
Soma Cruz, known in Japan as Sōma Kurusu (来須 蒼真, Kurusu Sōma), is the protagonist and primary playable character of both Aria of Sorrow and Dawn of Sorrow, and also is one of starting characters in Castlevania: Harmony of Despair. His Japanese voice actor in all games is Hikaru Midorikawa, and his English voice actor in Harmony of Despair is Eric Davies. Soma's presence in two Castlevania games, unusual for most Castlevania characters, was made by producer Koji Igarashi, who noted that one of the reasons he made Dawn of Sorrow was to utilize Soma Cruz in another game.

In both games, he is depicted as a transfer student studying in Japan (or simply as a Japanese high school student, in the Japanese version), living a peaceful life with his childhood friend Mina Hakuba. During the events of Aria of Sorrow, Soma awakens in Dracula's castle, where he learns of his "power of dominance," which enables him to absorb the souls of monsters and use their powers. He ventures through Dracula's castle, learning that Dracula had been destroyed years prior, and his reincarnation was coming to the castle that day. Defeating Graham Jones, who had harbored the notion that he was Dracula's reincarnation, causes Soma to realize that he is Dracula's reincarnation. With the aid of his friends, he is able to escape his fate by defeating the manifestation of the castle's chaos. In Dawn of Sorrow, Soma returns into battle to combat Celia Fortner's cult, which seeks to kill Soma and revive the dark lord. Soma manages to defeat them, and realizes at the end of the game that he is free to determine his own destiny rather than inevitably become another Dracula.

=== Mina Hakuba ===
Mina Hakuba (白馬 弥那, Hakuba Mina) is the childhood friend of Soma Cruz and the only daughter of the priest of the Hakuba shrine. Her attire in Aria of Sorrow reflects this, as her attire is that of a traditional miko. She is transported into Dracula's castle alongside Soma at the start of Aria of Sorrow and remains outside the castle for the duration of the game, offering Soma advice that she acquires from Arikado. When Soma realizes that he is Dracula's reincarnation, Mina is able to accept him for who he is, and offers him moral support. After Soma escapes his fate, Mina returns to the Hakuba shrine with him. In Dawn of Sorrow, Mina is briefly present in the game, present solely in the opening and ending sequences. In the beginning of Dawn of Sorrow, she and Soma are nearly killed by Celia Fortner, who is repelled by Soma and Arikado. Mina spends the remainder protected by Arikado's subordinates, but sends a letter and talisman to Soma during the course of the game. A doppelganger of her also appears in a later stage in the game. When confronted by Soma, Celia fakes killing the doppelganger in front of him, prompting a furious Soma to begin to transform into the dark lord. The talisman she sends him however, delays the transformation enough for Genya to reveal the truth to Soma, halting his transformation. At the end of the game, she and Soma share a tender moment, to the amusement of their onlooking friends. Given the striking similarity, Mina's name seems to have been inspired by Mina Harker from the original Bram Stoker works.

=== Julius Belmont ===
Julius Belmont (ユリウス・ベルモンド, Yuriusu Berumondo) is the latest member of the Belmont clan featured in the Castlevania series. Members of the Belmont clan have been the protagonists of most Castlevania games, and Julius' role as a supporting character is unusual for the series. His Japanese voice actor in both games is Tetsu Inada, and he is voiced by David Lodge in Castlevania: Harmony of Despair. In both Aria of Sorrow and Dawn of Sorrow, Julius is playable through "Julius Mode." While the "Julius Mode" in Aria of Sorrow solely features Julius, Yoko Belnades and Alucard can be unlocked as playable characters in the "Julius Mode" in Dawn of Sorrow. In Harmony of Despair he becomes a DLC character.

Prior to the event taking place in Aria of Sorrow, Julius is the last and only Belmont to permanently defeat Dracula in 1999 thus ending his rebirth cycle by sealing his source of power (Dracula's Castle) inside a solar eclipse. However Julius somehow became amnesiac and wandered the land until he arrived at Dracula's castle as the amnesiac "J," having forgotten his identity after defeating Dracula prior to the start of the game. He encounters Soma Cruz, and Soma's dark power awakens Julius' memories. Julius later confronts Soma after realizing that Soma is Dracula's reincarnation, and battles him. Julius, unwilling to pit his full power against Soma, is defeated. After Soma escapes his fate of becoming another dark lord, Julius sends his thanks. After the events in Aria of Sorrow, Julius works for the Roman Catholic Church alongside Yoko Belnades. In Dawn of Sorrow, he travels to the base housing Celia Fortner's cult with Yoko. Julius later battles Dario Bossi, one of the "dark lord's candidates" and Celia's henchman, and is defeated. After Celia and Dmitrii Blinov, the last candidate, flee into the depths of the castle, Julius uses all his power to shatter the barrier guarding their flight. He is greatly weakened as a result, and does not participate in the final battle; although he appears during the final cutscene of the game.

=== Yoko Belnades ===
Yoko Belnades (ヨーコ・ヴェルナンデス, Yōko Verunandesu) is a witch in the service of the Church. She is a member of the Belnades clan, whose members are adept at magic, a trait they inherited from the clan's progenitor, Sypha Belnades. In both games, she is voiced by: Hiroko Takahashi in Japanese, and her English voice actor in Castlevania: Harmony of Despair is Karen Strassman. Yoko comes to Dracula's castle during the events of Aria of Sorrow to stop Graham Jones, whom she believes will inherit Dracula's powers. She solicits the aid of Soma Cruz, but is stabbed by Graham when he confronts her. She is saved by Arikado, and later thanks Soma for saving her, expressing her shock that he was Dracula's reincarnation.

Yoko returns in Dawn of Sorrow as an associate of Julius Belmont. However, Julius quickly abandons her to search the castle. Yoko teaches Soma the use of a Magic Seal, and offers to increase the power of his weapons by binding the souls under his dominance to them. Although Hammer is infatuated with her, she appears to be either oblivious or uncaring of his affections. She appears during the final cutscene at the end of the game. Yoko is playable in the game's "Julius Mode." and in Harmony of Despair as a DLC character.

=== Hammer ===
Hammer (ハマー, Hamā) is a member of the United States military that comes to the Hakuba shrine on orders from his superiors. He quickly abandons his mission when he is teleported into Dracula's castle, and on meeting Soma Cruz, becomes his vendor, serving as the game's in-game shop. During this time, he falls in love with Yoko Belnades, who does not reciprocate his affection. After Soma defeats the manifestation of chaos in the castle, he expresses his thanks to Soma, and says that he will quit the military to pursue his ambition of becoming a salesman.

After leaving the military, Hammer starts his work as an independent merchant, and acts as an information broker through his "shady business contacts." It is through this information that Soma discovers the location of Celia Fortner's base in Dawn of Sorrow. Hammer arrives, and promises to be Soma's vendor again. He stations his shop directly opposite Yoko's, and constantly hounds Soma over his infatuation with Yoko over the course of the game. He appears with the other characters at the end of the game during the final cutscene.

=== Leon Belmont ===
Leon Belmont (レオン・ベルモンド, Reon Berumondo; Leon Belmondo) is the progenitor and founder of the Belmont Clan, being the original wielder of the Vampire Killer whip and the first to dedicate himself to fighting creatures of the night, eventually setting the legacy for his future heirs. He is the main protagonist of Castlevania: Lament of Innocence and appears as a major supporting character in Castlevania: Belmont's Curse.

In 11th century-Europe, Leon served as a knight for the Holy Order of the church, fighting alongside tactician Matthias Cronqvist and ascending to the title of Baron, lauded for his combat aptitude in tandem with the latter's cunning. The death of Matthias' wife caused him to fall into grief and become bedridden, rescinding his responsibilities and no longer coming to Leon's aid in battle. A year later, supernatural monsters began attacking Leon's village and yet he was forbidden by the Church from engaging them, due to their strict focus on opposing kingdoms and heretics. During the invasion, Leon's own fiancee Sara Trantoul would be kidnapped by the vampire Walter Bernhard and taken to his castle, located in the Forest of Eternal Night. Desperate to save her, Leon renounced his duties as a Baron and journeyed into the forest alone. Outside the castle, he met the alchemist Rinaldo Gandolfi, who gave him a leather whip imbued with alchemy to fight the monsters inside the keep, including five guardians who guarded the path to Walter's throne room. Leon wound up defeating the vampire Joachim Armster, the monstrous Medusa, and a succubus who attempted to seduce Belmont by disguising herself as Sara. Upon reaching the throne room, Leon failed to wound Bernhard due to the whip's incomplete state, and upon taking Sara back to Gandolfi's base would learn that Bernhard had already bitten her, afflicting her with impending vampirism. Rinaldo relayed to Leon that the whip's full power could be unlocked through a ritual that required the sacrifice of a beloved soul, with Sara offering herself due to her life already being threatened. Hesitant but ultimately conceding, Leon slayed Trantoul with the whip and bound her soul's essence to it, transforming it into the Vampire Killer and returning to Walter's throne room. Using the empowered whip to destroy the Ebony Stone raising his defenses, Leon killed Walter and watched as Death reaped his soul to transfer it to the Crimson Stone. Matthias reveals himself as having masterminded the monster invasion and Sara's capture, relinquishing his humanity to become an immortal vampire, and intending to launch a crusade against God out of vengeance for the death of his wife and the complacency of the church. Leon resisted Matthias' offer of a similar arrangement and eventually defeated Death, asking them to deliver to Matthias a vow to hunt all of his supernatural forces that would be passed down to his successors.

Leon devoted the remainder of his life to killing Matthias, who had since rechristened himself as Vlad Dracula Tepes, Lord of Darkness. After years of searching his whereabouts, Leon would find Dracula nearing death, but would succumb to a curse placed on him by the vampire that transformed him into a mindless, amnesiac creature known as the Fallen. In 1499, the corrupted Leon would be ordered to serve Death in collecting the souls of innocents he killed in Paris, which he would bring to the entity in the Parisian Catacombs for reaping. At the entrance to the catacombs, Leon unwittingly encountered and was defeated by his descendant Rose Belmont, who trapped and purified his soul in one of her Tarot Cards, regaining memory of his prior life and assisting the incumbent Belmont in finding Dracula. Rose would sacrifice all of her Tarot Cards and their souls to defeat Dracula in his newly restored castle, causing Leon's soul to officially depart in the afterlife.

Leon is voiced by Dave Wittenberg in Lament of Innocence, and by Ray Chase in Belmont's Curse. Leon also makes a cameo appearance as part of the "Greatest Five" Dual Crush spell performed by Jonathan Morris and Charlotte Aulin in Castlevania: Portrait of Ruin, as well as playable appearances in the games Bail or Jail and Vampire Survivors.

== Antagonists ==
=== Dracula ===
The main antagonist of the Castlevania series is Dracula (ドラキュラ, Dorakyura), based on the original character by Bram Stoker and his depiction in film. His real name is Mathias Cronqvist, a former crusader from the 11th century who rebelled against God after the death of his wife, Elisabetha and resorts to dark magic in order to become immortal. He is always defeated by members of the Belmont Clan, wearing a magical whip created with the sole intent of repelling the forces of evil, but returns some time later along his castle as part of his plan to take over the world. With a few exceptions, he has starred in every title. Dracula is destroyed for good in 1999 but reincarnates in the modern times as a human called Soma Cruz, who seeks to live a normal life but ends up targeted by evil sorcerers who intend to obtain the dormant power of Dracula within him for themselves.

Dracula debuts in Castlevania (1986), as a vampire who was once defeated by Christopher Belmont one hundred years ago in Transylvania. He rises from the dead after his followers hold a black mass. Christopher's descendant, Simon Belmont, enters Dracula's castle and defeats him. Later titles introduce Dracula's son, the dhampir Alucard, who sided with Trevor Belmont against his father. Symphony of the Night reveals Alucard's mother to be Lisa Ţepeş, a human Dracula fell in love with. Her execution for false charges of witchcraft left him griefstricken and reignited his hatred on humanity, leading to his son get estranged from him.

The 2010 reboot, Castlevania: Lords of Shadow, reintroduces Dracula as Gabriel Belmont, a member of the Brotherhood of Light who fights the Lords of Shadow to obtain the God Mask, which he believes can bring back his deceased wife, Marie. Gabriel eventually becomes a vampire and stars as Dracula in the sequels Castlevania: Lords of Shadow – Mirror of Fate (2013) and Castlevania: Lords of Shadow 2 (2014), where he searches for a way to end his immortality.

=== Death ===
Death (死神, Shinigami; lit. "god of death") is present in all Castlevania games, except for Haunted Castle, Castlevania: The Adventure and Castlevania II: Belmont's Revenge. He is considered Dracula's second-in-command and most trusted minion, and is often a boss fought toward the end of the game. As well, he has sometimes played an important role in the storyline, such as in Castlevania: Lament of Innocence. He is a playable character as the skeletal knight in Castlevania Judgment.

In most appearances, Death closely resembles the cultural personification of the Grim Reaper, being a legless skeleton who wears a hooded cloak and wields a scythe. Like Dracula, he can change into a second form upon being defeated, although this ability is not used as often.

Death also appears in the 2018 crossover fighting game Super Smash Bros. Ultimate as a background character on the Dracula's Castle stage. Simon and Richter's reveal trailer features Death claiming the soul of a panicked Luigi before Simon intervenes.

The character of Zobek, Lord of the Dead (voiced by Patrick Stewart) in the reboot Castlevania: Lords of Shadow has been speculated to be the version of Death in this universe, due to his relationship with Dracula. Additionally, the Lord of the Necromancers is at one point referred to as "Death itself". In the game's sequel, when Gabriel Belmont is forced into a confrontation with Zobek, he sheds his human form and takes on an appearance resembling a more traditional depiction of Death, including wielding a large scythe.

=== Carmilla ===
Carmilla (カーミラ, Kāmira) is a devoted worshipper of chaos and Dracula. Her name is a reference to the title character of the 1872 novel Carmilla, which predated Bram Stoker's Dracula by 25 years. Her first appearance was as an antagonist in Castlevania II: Simon's Quest. She later reappeared in Castlevania: Rond of Blood, Castlevania: Dracula X, Castlevania: Circle of the Moon (styled as Camilla, non-canon), Castlevania Judgment and Castlevania: Belmont's Curse.

Carmilla's appearances and names have differed. In Simon's Quest, she was originally known as Vampira (女吸血鬼, Jo Kyūketsuki; lit. "Female Vampire") in the instruction manual, though the in-game hidden clue refers to her as Camilla. The Camilla spelling is also used in Circle of the Moon, while all other appearances favor the Carmilla spelling. Her initial appearance in Simon's Quest was interpreted as a mask that leaked tears of blood, while later appearances give her a humanoid form.

In Circle of the Moon, she successfully resurrects Dracula in her Austrian castle in 1830. However, he had not regained his full power, so to restore it they plan to sacrifice the vampire hunter Morris Baldwin, father to Hugh Baldwin and mentor to Nathan Graves, during a lunar eclipse of the full moon. As Nathan makes headway in his efforts to rescue his master, Camilla brainwashes Hugh and challenges Nathan to a battle in the Underground Waterway. Despite dying, Camilla revels in the fact the rite to restore Dracula's power is nearly complete.

In Rondo of Blood, Carmilla has a blue-haired companion called Laura (ローラ, Rōra), named after the central protagonist and narrator from Carmilla. She is a non-boss enemy in Portrait of Ruin, but is referred to as "Carmilla's eternal servant" in her bestiary entry. In the reboot Lords of Shadow, Laura is Carmilla's daughter, who challenges the main character Gabriel with dangerous games.

In the reboot Lords of Shadow, Carmilla is played by Sally Knyvette. She is one of the titular Lords, ruling over the vampires and is the second lord faced by the protagonist, Gabriel Belmont. She has a vampire "daughter" named Laura. Before sacrificing her soul to heaven, she was known to be a kind woman who loved all of Earth's creatures, and became the opposite as a Lord of Shadow. This is a marked departure from the description of her in life in the original novel. However, the explicit sexuality sometimes attributed to her, most prominently in Castlevania: Judgment, is a reference to her characterization in the novel. She reappears in the sequel, Castlevania: Lords of Shadow 2, with a different appearance.

She appears in the 2018 crossover fighting game Super Smash Bros. Ultimate as a background character on the Dracula's Castle stage, based on her appearance in Simon's Quest. She also appears at the end of Simon and Richter's reveal trailer, frightening Luigi as his soul is about to re-enter his body.

=== Shaft ===
Shaft (シャフト, Shafuto) is a dark priest that appears as the secondary antagonist of Akumajō Dracula X Chi no Rondo and Castlevania: Symphony of the Night. In 1792, Shaft aids Dracula in his plans to kidnap several young women. He is defeated by Richter after conjuring several monsters in an attempt to defeat him. Later in the game, Shaft's ghost makes a final attempt to stop the hero.

In 1797, Dracula's monsters kidnap Richter and brainwash him. Shaft is instrumental in using his evil powers to control Richter, turning him against anyone who seeks to defy Dracula. Maria guesses that he is under their influence and helps Alucard to see past Shaft's deception. Alucard is able to save Richter instead of killing him, and goes on to defeat Shaft, although not before Shaft successfully revives Dracula just before being stopped for good.

=== Isaac ===
Isaac (アイザック, Aizakku) appears in Curse of Darkness and Belmont's Curse. He is Hector's villainous rival, who stayed loyal to Dracula after Trevor defeated him a few years before the start of the game. The player will fight Isaac a few times over the course of the game.
