= Alucard (Castlevania) =

Fictional character in Castlevania video games

- Castlevania character
- Alucard in Castlevania: Symphony of the Night
- First game: Castlevania III: Dracula's Curse (1989)
- Designed by: T. Fujimoto and I. Urata; Ayami Kojima (Symphony of the Night)
- Voiced by: English: Robert Belgrade (Castlevania: Symphony of the Night original dub); Richard Madden (Lords of Shadow series); Yuri Lowenthal (2007–present); Chris Nelson (Castlevania: Grimoire of Souls); James Callis (Castlevania Netflix series); Japanese: Ryōtarō Okiayu (Castlevania: Symphony of the Night, Castlevania: Dawn of Sorrow, Castlevania: Harmony of Despair, Super Smash Bros. Ultimate, Grimoire of Souls); Mamoru Miyano (Castlevania Judgment, Akumajō Dracula: Nocturne of Recollection); Shin-ichiro Miki (Castlevania Netflix series)

In-universe information
- Species: Dhampir
- Gender: Male

Adrian Fahrenheit Țepeș (Japanese: アドリアン・ファーレンハイツ・ツェペシュ, Hepburn: Adorian Fārenhaitsu Tsepeshu), better known as Alucard (Japanese: アルカード, Hepburn: Arukādo), is a character in Konami's Castlevania series of video games. His first appearance in the series was in the 1989 game Castlevania III: Dracula's Curse, but he is best known for his role in the critically acclaimed Castlevania: Symphony of the Night, released in 1997. His design in Symphony of the Night was created by Ayami Kojima, marking her first contribution to the Castlevania franchise.

In the series, Alucard is the son of Dracula, the antagonist of the Castlevania series. Due to his human mother, Lisa, Alucard is a dhampir, a half-human, half-vampire. His mother's death and admonition not to hate humanity caused him to take up arms against his father. In Dracula's Curse and Castlevania Legends, he fights against his father alongside the vampire hunters of the Belmont clan, and he is featured as the protagonist of Symphony of the Night. Alucard additionally is present in Castlevania: Aria of Sorrow and the follow-up sequel Castlevania: Dawn of Sorrow, where he interacts with the protagonist of both games, Soma Cruz, as the Japanese government agent Genya Arikado (有角 幻也, Arikado Gen'ya). The Lords of Shadow reboot series, starting with the character's introduction in Castlevania: Lords of Shadow – Mirror of Fate, introduces a reimagined Alucard with a new backstory, revealing him as Trevor Belmont, once a mortal who was transformed into a vampire after his death at the hands of his biological father, the remorseful Dracula.

Several video game publications have provided praise and criticism on Alucard's character. While Alucard debuted in Dracula's Curse, his characterization stood out more in Symphony of the Night for being a different type of protagonist from his predecessors. In Aria of Sorrow and Dawn of Sorrow, where Alucard was present as Genya Arikado, reviewers noted that although he fell into a stereotypical character mold, the greater concentration on supporting characters was a welcomed change from previous Castlevania games. Alucard's portrayal in the Lords of Shadow and Netflix series also led to positive response by the media.

== Conception and development ==
Alucard was intended to be a mirror image of his father, as evidenced by his name, his father's name spelled backwards. The original Castlevania games for the Nintendo Entertainment System (NES) contained references to the Universal Horror films, with Alucard being a tribute to Lon Chaney Jr.'s role as Count Alucard from the 1943 film, Son Of Dracula.

The idea of using Alucard as a protagonist in Symphony of the Night came from Konami's idea for a character whose abilities could grow and change, and also a character who could transform into other things. Given those two points, and the need to connect the protagonist to the history of Castlevania, they chose Alucard. The original design was not found appealing by the staff, and they redesigned him. While the game does not explain it, Alucard can use holy weapons thanks to his human heritage.

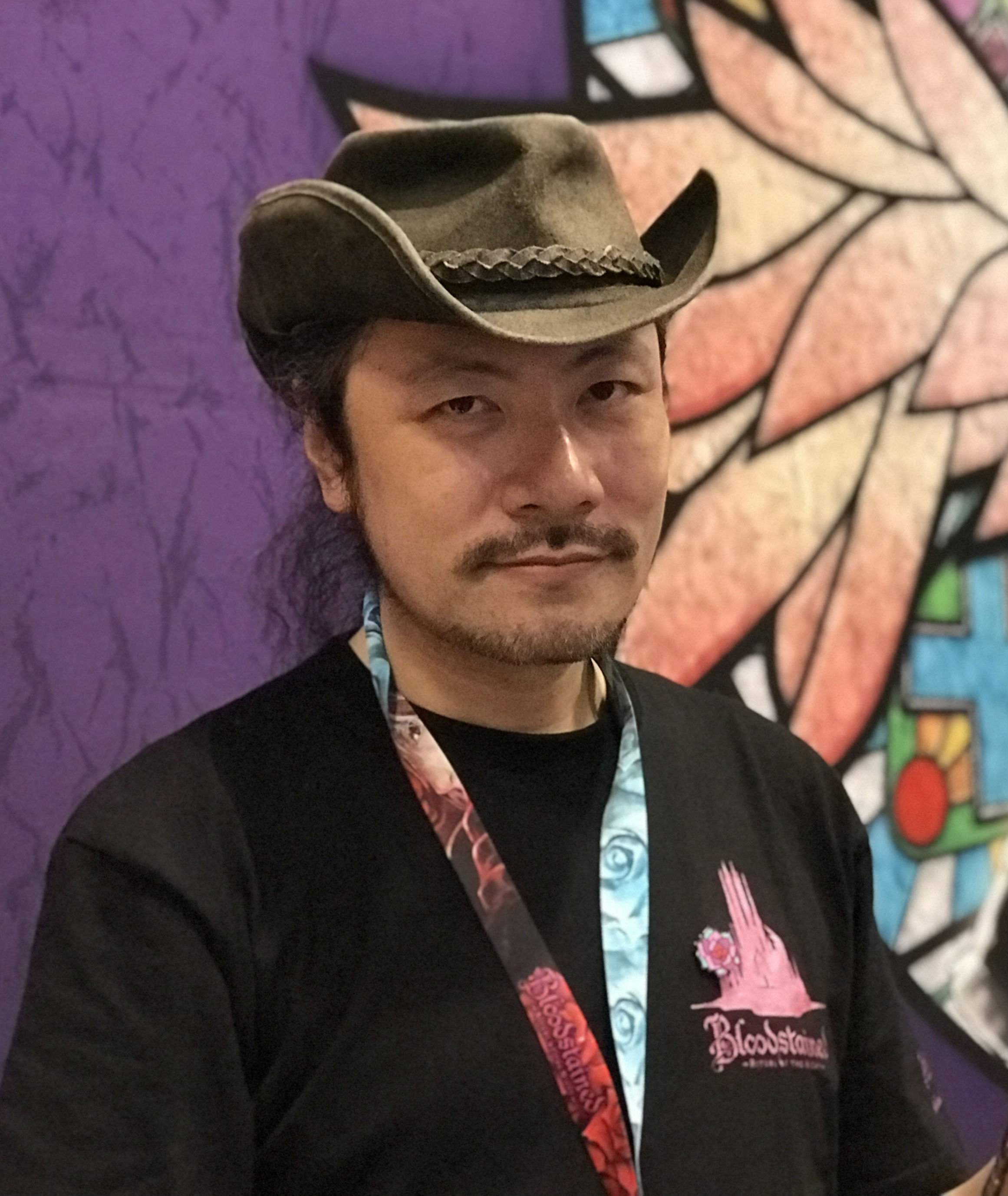
Game designer Koji Igarashi oversaw several changes for Alucard for his role in Symphony of the Night onwards.

The ending of Symphony of the Night where Maria chases after Alucard was left to the player's interpretation. Though the idea about a romantic interaction was planned, the team did not want Alucard to turn Maria into another vampire. Another idea Igarashi had was that Alucard defeated Dracula in the original plotline by Bram Stoker, instead of Quincy Morris. Despite pressure for the change of protagonist, Alucard was highly popular to the fanbase with the staff members thinking it was due to him being cool.

When it came to the reboot Castlevania: Lords of Shadow, Mercury Steam told the audience the spin-off Mirror of Fate would include Trevor Belmont and Alucard as different playable characters, before later revealing them to be the same character but transformed. With Mirror of Fate, Mercury Steam wanted to explain the story that connects the Belmont Clan with Dracula. Alcuard plays a major in the sequel due to his connection with Dracula. For the DLC of the next game, Alucard became playable with the plot being focused more on his relationship with Dracula before the events of Lords of Shadow 2.

For the Netflix series of Castlevania, the art team were given directions from Konami staff members. One of those factors was Alucard's ambidextrous talents, or lack thereof. In the original animation for the show's fourth and final episode of its first season, animation director Spencer Wan had drawn Alucard holding a sword in his left hand. It was only after revisiting notes from Konami that Wan remembered the video game publisher had reminded the art team at Powerhouse Animation that Alucard had to be drawn as right-handed. This led to several changes in the making of the series in order to make Netflix's Alucard fit Konami's ideas. The first encounter between Alucard and Trevor was one of the most challenging fights to animate but the staff found that Alucard being shirtless made it easier. Despite the narrative focusing too much on tragedy, the staff made sure to give Alucard and Trevor Belmont a friendly relationship that often comes across as childish to balance the tone. For the fourth season, the team promised the emotionally destroyed Alucard would recover his humanity in this new arc.

The writers always planned to bring back Alucard for Nocturne even if he only appeared in the last scene from its first season. They wanted to make it a surprise return as well as make it as beautiful as possible. In retrospective, Producer Adi Shankar said that Symphony of the Night stood out for deviating from the franchise's common narrative elements of the Belmont clan and instead focused on Alucard who is too different from previous protagonists. He further compared the story with how different the Marvel Universe films are as they go from Captain America: The First Avenger (2011) to Captain America: Civil War (2016). This version of Alucard was later confirmed as bisexual on Twitter by Sam Deats, one of the series directors. Alucard also appears in Castlevania: Nocturne.

=== Design ===
Alucard debuted in Castlevania III: Dracula's Curse for the Nintendo Entertainment System, where he was designed by T. Fujimoto and I. Urata. Much of the original artwork for the game was lost during the Great Hanshin earthquake. Alucard's subsequent appearances would largely be designed by Ayami Kojima, who managed the character designs for Castlevania: Symphony of the Night and Castlevania: Aria of Sorrow.

Kojima's work in Symphony of the Night was her first breakthrough into the gaming industry, and her dark, gothic style borrows heavily from bishōnen-style art. From a visual perspective, Toshiharu Furukawa found it appealing to have a stylish man as the lead for this installment. Along with the change in lead, there was also a switch in visual style from an anime-esque look to one inspired by Baroque art. Kojima was inspired by the novels Vampire Hunter D illustrated by Yoshitaka Amano when working in the game, with Alucard being highly influenced by its title and main character.

In Aria of Sorrow, Kojima's designs followed the new theme that producer Koji Igarashi was attempting to pursue by placing it in a futuristic setting. Following this theme, Alucard's appearance as Genya Arikado was made much more contemporary, featuring modern attire compared the historical appearances of previous Castlevania characters. Kojima was not present in the design team for Castlevania: Dawn of Sorrow, and Arikado, along with the rest of the cast, were drawn in an anime style. Igarashi, also the producer of Dawn of Sorrow, wished to utilize the anime style as a marketing technique due to his belief that the Nintendo DS targeted a younger audience than previous systems had. The anime style would also serve as a litmus test as to whether future Castlevania games would incorporate the style. For the Netflix series, Alucard's design was inspired by Symphony of the Night with the director noting it was "deep" for the character despite Trevor and other characters being influenced by other games.

For Lords of Shadow - Mirror of Fate, Alucard's human form, Trevor Belmont, was created as a parallel to Dracula's former self, Gabriel Belmont. MercurySteam had more freedom with this game resulting in connections between the Belmont and Dracula. Despite being Dracula's child, Alucard was designed with the idea of being his opposite as shown with how he is attached to the light. The staff wanted Trevor to stand out and not look identical to Gabriel. Meanwhile, there were less hints about Simon Belmont being Trevor's son. The themes of fate and the parallels involving Alucard and Dracula was inspired by Christopher Nolan's film, Memento (2000). The powers Alucard has access to in the Lords of Shadow reboot were loosely based on Symphony of the Night.

=== Voice actors ===
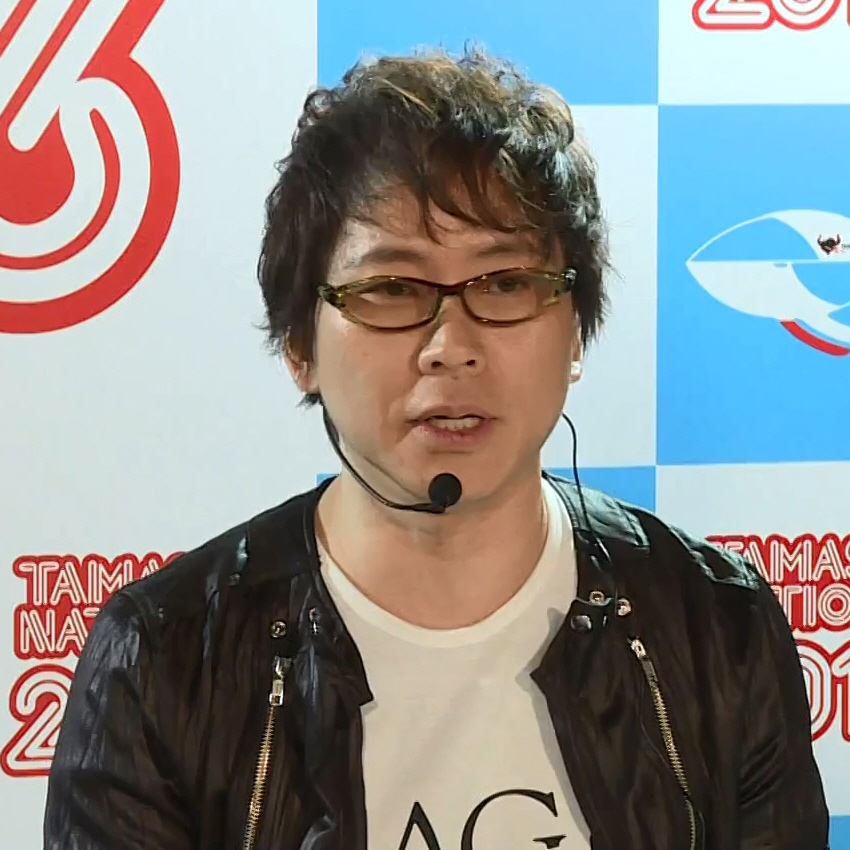
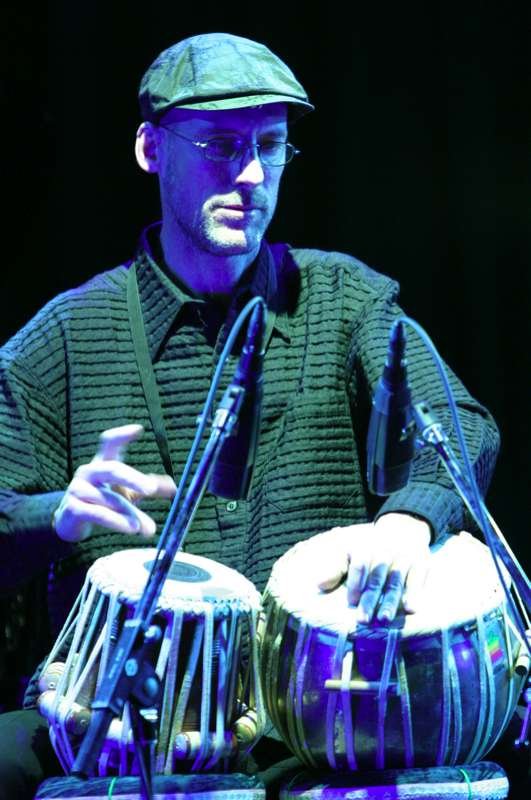
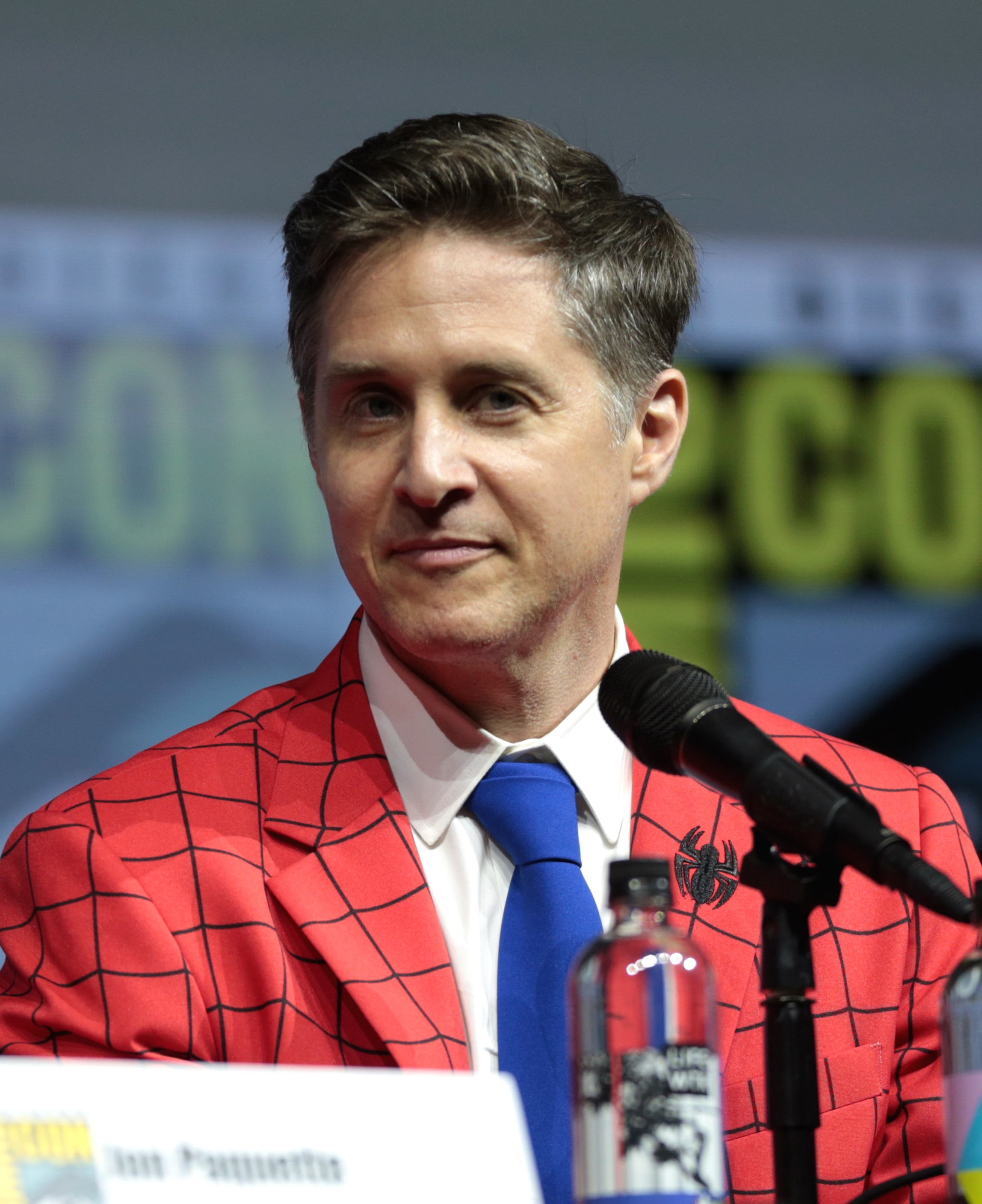
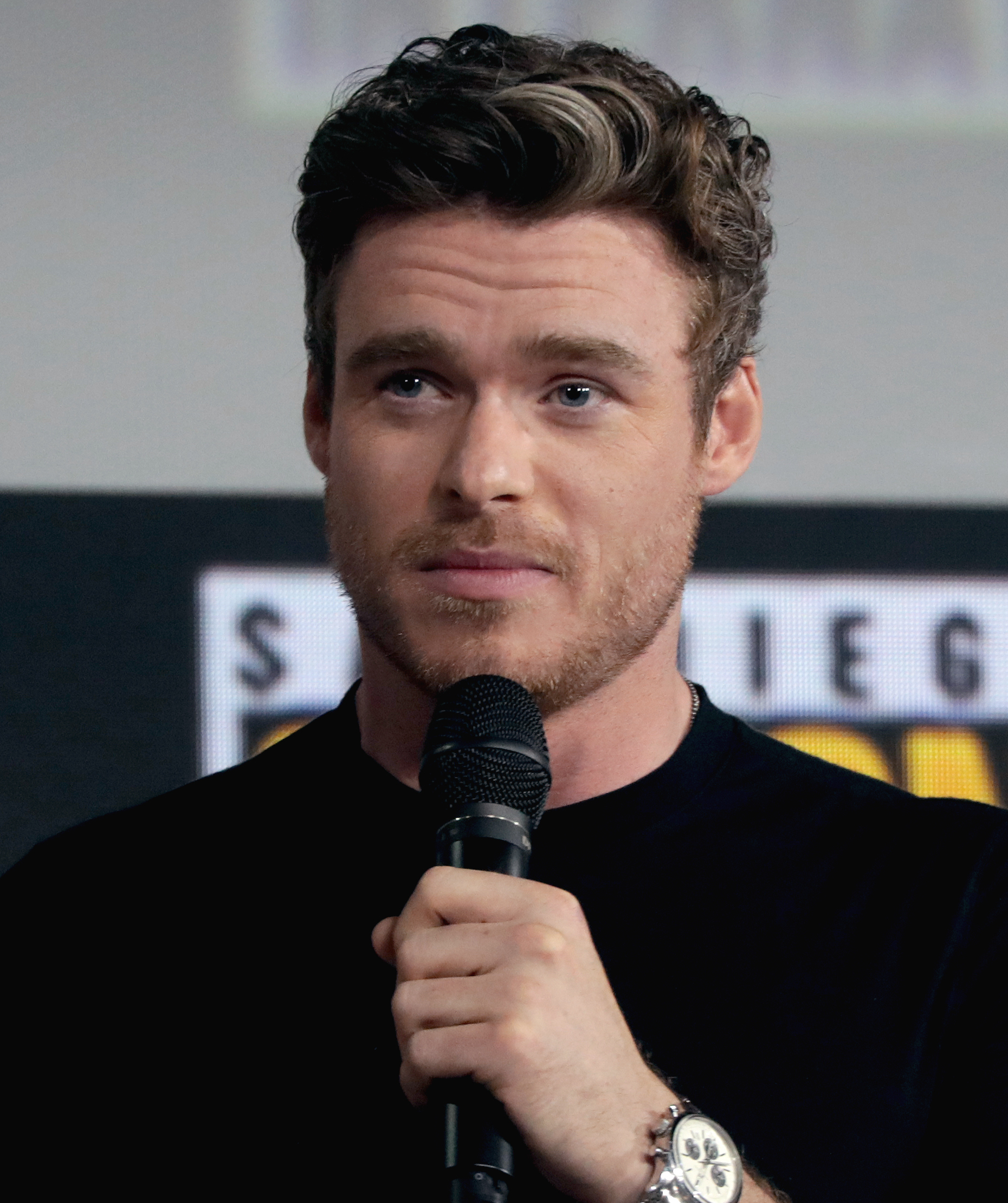
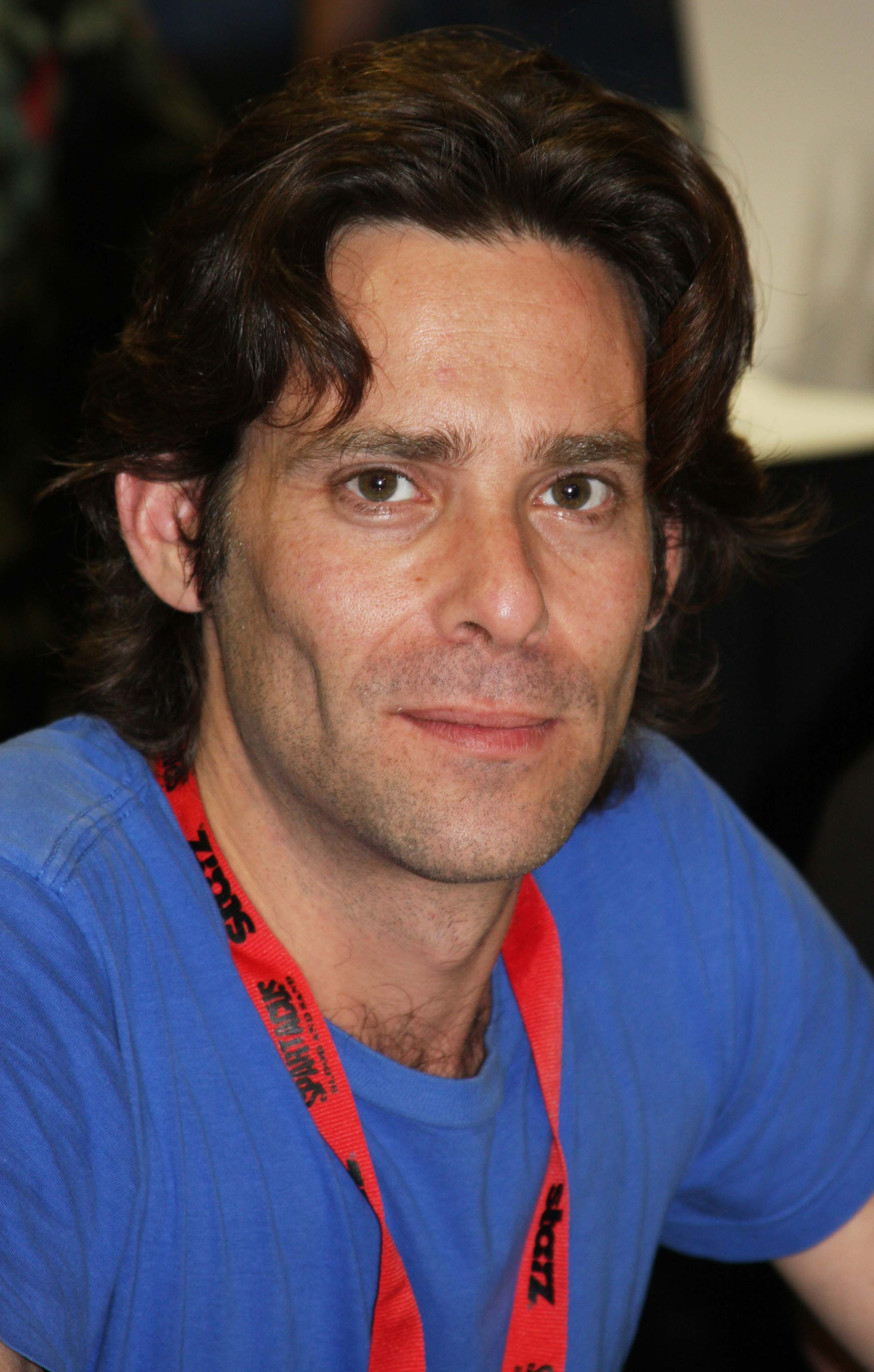
Ryōtarō Okiayu (left) is Alucard's first Japanese voice actor. Robert Belgrade (second) and Yuri Lowenthal (third) voiced him in the two English localizations. Meanwhile, Richard Madden (fourth) voiced him the Lords of Shadow series and James Callis (fifth) in the Netflix series.

Symphony of the Night is the second Castlevania game to employ voice actors for the characters (the first being the Akumajō Dracula X Chi no Rondo for the PC Engine Super CD-ROM²). The Japanese voice actor for Alucard was Ryōtarō Okiayu, and the English voice actor was Robert Belgrade. Igarashi especially liked the final scene, when Alucard says "Trouble the soul of my mother no more!" as it emphasizes the character's humanity, in contrast to his quiet and emotionless lines earlier in the game. The English actor, Robert Belgrade, grew fond on the game and noticed he received favorable feedback from the fans. Belgrade lamented he was not called by Konami for later works which he attributes due to the localization team being moved.

Igarashi noted that due to fan complaints over the voice acting in Symphony of the Night, a new script for the game as well as a set of new voice actors were used in The Dracula X Chronicles. Yuri Lowenthal replaced Belgrade for this version.

In the Lords of Shadow series, Alucard is voiced by Richard Madden. Producer Dave Cox claimed Madden was chosen due to his popularity and talent in order to fit with other famous actors like Robert Carlyle and Patrick Stewart.

James Callis voices Alucard in the 2017 Netflix series Castlevania and its 2023 sequel, Castlevania: Nocturne. Callis originally auditioned for Trevor. However, the way he did his Trevor audition was exactly how he voices Alucard, which the staff found funny. This led to Callis taking the role of Alucard. The team enjoyed recording several lines due to how violent and humorous some interactions were.

Caliis recalls being a fan of vampire stories in his youth but played few Castlevania games during that time. As a result, he had no knowledge of the franchise when being cast for the role. He was impressed by Netflix's Castlevania. In describing his character, he considers it fair to say that he plays his Alucard's very close to himself. He added that the character "has lived, loved, experienced humanity in all its glory and its despair" and manages to become more human when interacting with the human race. He felt that if he had one word to describe his tragic heritage, it would be a "torn". Callis further claimed Alucard "as having the visage and demeanor of a placid lake", repressing his human instincts.

== Appearances ==
=== Video games ===
In the 1989 Castlevania III: Dracula's Curse for the NES, Alucard is initially a boss encountered by the primary protagonist, Trevor Belmont. If the player defeats Alucard, he can be utilized as a playable character in the game.

Alucard's following appearance in the series is in the 1997 game, Castlevania: Symphony of the Night, where he is featured as the game's protagonist and primary playable character. Due to the brainwashing of the current member of the Belmont clan, Richter Belmont, Alucard heads to his father's castle to find Richter and ensure that Dracula does not return. He encounters Richter, who has been controlled by the dark priest Shaft into believing he is the lord of Dracula's castle, and Alucard manages to free him from the spell controlling him. In response, Shaft creates an inverted version of Dracula's castle for Alucard to travel through, and Alucard defeats him, and ultimately, Dracula as well. Symphony of the Night also expands on Alucard's background, revealing how his human mother, Lisa, was hunted down and executed by humans who believed her to be a witch. Despite this, Lisa admonished Alucard to respect humans and not hate them as his father did. In an alternative ending, the young Maria either chases Alucard in the hope of helping him, or resigns herself to Alucard's fate and leaves with Richter.

The 1997 Castlevania Legends was Alucard's third appearance in the series. Similar to his initial appearance in Dracula's Curse, he is a boss challenging the skills of the game's protagonist, Sonia Belmont. After she defeats him, he accepts her strength and decides to submerge his powers by entering a deep sleep, believing that she will defeat Dracula in his stead. The ending implies Alucard to be the father of Sonia's child, though the game has since been removed from the series canon.

In the 2003 Castlevania: Aria of Sorrow, Alucard is disguised as the enigmatic Japanese government agent Genya Arikado in order to prevent the powers of his father, who was finally killed by Julius Belmont, from ending up in the wrong hands. He meets the game's protagonist, Soma Cruz, and explains his "power of dominance," or his ability to absorb the souls of the monsters he defeats and use their abilities. He instructs him to seek out the castle's throne room, where Soma realizes that he is Dracula's reincarnation. Arikado subsequently advises Soma to destroy the flow of chaos in the castle to free himself from his fate, which Soma succeeds in doing.

Alucard reprises his role as Arikado in the sequel to Aria of Sorrow, Castlevania: Dawn of Sorrow (2005), where he works to stop the machinations of a cult headed by Celia Fortner to create a new dark lord by killing Soma. Arikado initially requests that Soma does not become involved, but gives him a letter and talisman from Mina when he encounters him later in the game. After both of Celia's "dark lord's candidates," Dmitrii Blinov and Dario Bossi, are defeated, Arikado stops Celia's attempt to force Soma to awaken as the new dark lord, but inadvertently allows Dmitrii to revive himself. He confronts him, but is stopped when Dmitrii uses Celia as a sacrifice to seal his powers. Following Soma's battle with Menace, a giant demon that sprouts from Dmitrii, Arikado explains to Soma that he is not destined to become the dark lord, nor does he need to. In the game's Julius Mode, Arikado is playable as Alucard after he is found in the castle. Alucard was one of the playable characters in Castlevania Judgment for the Nintendo Wii, a fighting game based on the series.

Alucard appears in Castlevania: Lords of Shadow – Mirror of Fate, the second installment in the Lords of Shadow reboot series. In the first half, Alucard assists the protagonist, his son Simon Belmont, into defeating Dracula. The second half reveals that Alucard's human life as Trevor Belmont who goes on a journey to kill his father. However, Trevor is defeated by Dracula who learns in his last moments he is his son. Shocked, Dracula passes Trevor his blood, reviving him as the vampire Alucard. Alucard later appears in the sequel Castlevania: Lords of Shadow 2 as a supporting character... His human persona appears to Dracula requesting him to reform the Mirror of Fate. In the climax, it is revealed that the real Alucard had sent his father into a comatose state in order to make their enemies Zobek prepare for Satan's return and end the world. When Alucard remembers this, it is revealed Alucard has been taking the form of Zobek's bodyguard. Both Dracula and Alucard join forces to defeat Zobek but Satan returns and possesses the young vampire. Dracula manages to kill Satan while saving Alucard at the same time. Alucard then asks his father what will they do as the father breaks the Mirror of Fate. MercurySteam also released a downloadable content chapter Revelations, where Alucard is the playable character as he protects his father in preparations for the events of Lords of Shadow 2, while also defeating one of Zobek's guardians to take his armor and remain hidden.

Alucard makes a cameo appearance as an Assist Trophy in Super Smash Bros. Ultimate. He also debuted as a playable fighter in Brawlhalla on October 19, 2022.

Alucard appears as a Legendary skin for Trevor Belmont in Dead by Daylight, released alongside him with the Castlevania expansion in August 2024.

=== Animated series ===
A version of Alucard makes a minor appearance in Captain N: The Game Master. Here, he is depicted as a rebellious teenager who enjoys skateboarding and music, much to his father's chagrin. He appears in the Season 3 episode "Return to Castlevania", initially posing as an ally to the heroes before revealing himself to be in league with the Count.

Alucard, voiced by James Callis, appears as a major character in the 2017 Castlevania animated series, which is primarily based on the 1989 video game Castlevania III: Dracula's Curse. In the first season, Alucard meets and engages Trevor and Sypha. Alucard reveals that the myth of the "sleeping soldier" was actually himself, and that he was testing their abilities. The three prepare to challenge Dracula and end the conflict for good. For the second season, the trio go to locate Dracula's castle, as it can teleport from place to place. Trevor fights off the demons as Alucard uses the distance mirror to locate Dracula's castle. Eventually, Alucard reaches the study and attacks Dracula. Dracula is overcome by remorse before allowing Alucard to stake him through the heart, killing him. Alucard is upset about having killed his father, eventually being overcome by grief and breaks down crying.

In the third season, a month after Dracula's death, Alucard tries to adjust to his loneliness, but he misses Trevor and Sypha and fears he is going insane. At the Belmont Hold, Alucard is visited by a pair of vampire hunters from Japan, Sumi and Taka, who wish to be trained by him in order to defend their people, which he accepts. During the night, Sumi and Taka enter Alucard's room to have sex with him in an attempt to trap him. They accuse Alucard of withholding his knowledge of magic from them and not teaching them how to operate the castle. Before they can stake him, he uses his sword to slit their throats. A grieving Alucard leaves Sumi and Taka's impaled bodies outside of Dracula's castle as a warning to future visitors, just as Dracula had before him. During season four, Alucard accepts the village leader Greta's request to act as its protector. Alucard also meets Saint Germain who request to protect their people. Alucard and Greta lead the refugees in a desperate fight against the vampire Dragan's forces, but are eventually forced back into Dracula's castle. Trevor and Sypha arrive through the mirror at Dracula's castle, where they reunite with Alucard and fight through the invaders. After defeating Death, the three reflect on all they survived together and look forward to a brighter future. Alucard also makes a cameo in the spin-off Castlevania: Nocturne.

== Reception ==
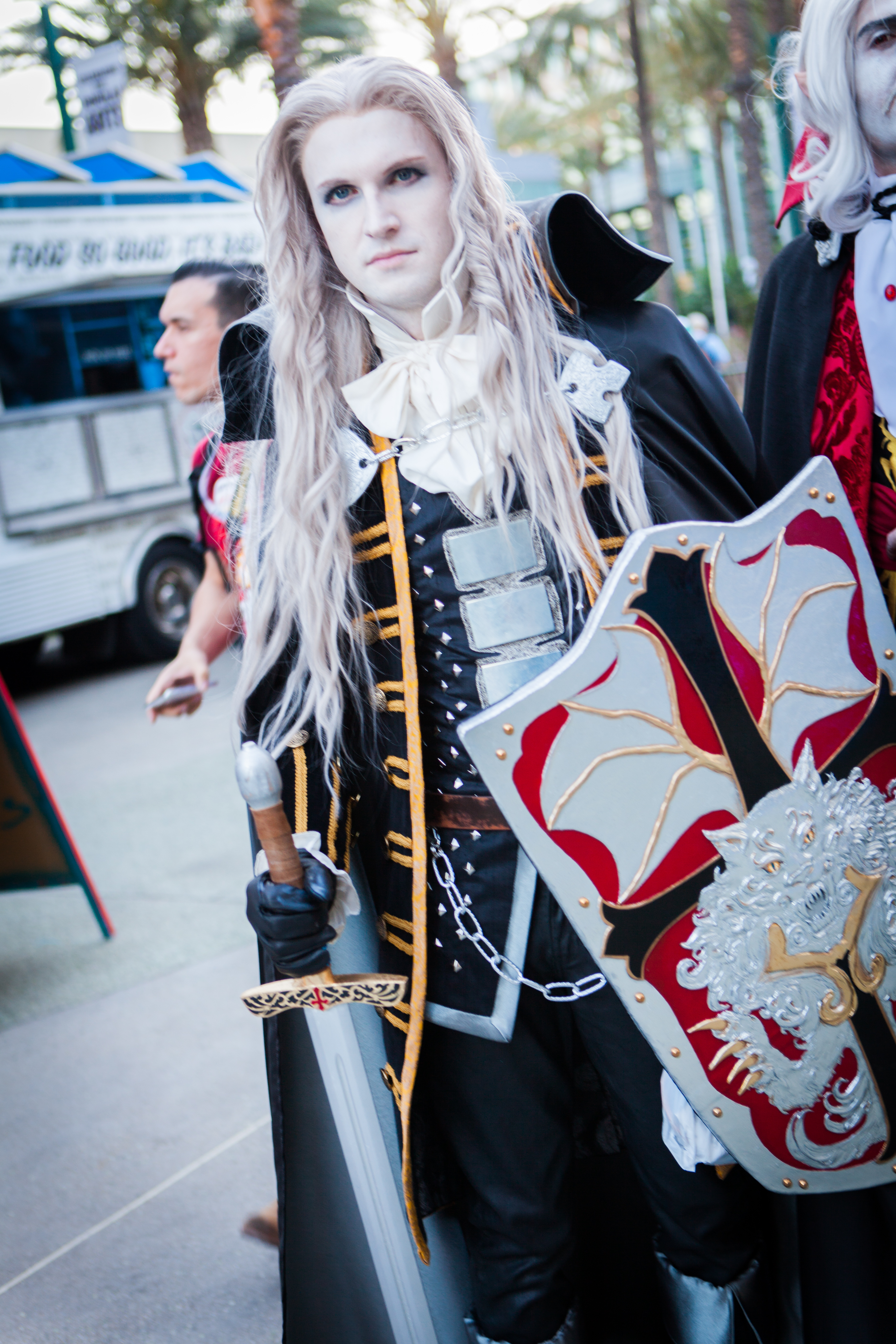
Alucard's gothic design by Ayami Kojima has stood out within the fandom, inspiring several cosplays.

Alucard has received praise and criticism from several video game publications, primarily concentrating on his role in Symphony of the Night. GameSpot featured him in their article "All Time Greatest Game Hero". Magazines have also described him as one of the best and greatest video game character. In a review of Symphony of the Night, RPGFan celebrated the fact that Alucard was not a member of the Belmont clan, the protagonists of most Castlevania games, and that the fact he was Dracula's son added "an element of depth to the plot" due to the varied reactions he would receive from the inhabitants of Dracula's castle. RPGamer disagreed with this assessment, noting that the plot and Alucard's role "isn't very deep" and secondary to the concentration on gameplay. James Paul Gee noted that "even though Alucard is a vampire hunter, he has no distinctive skills associated with this profession". In the book A New Literacies Sampler, the writer expressed a favoritism in Alucard though he did not find his skills and moves were unique for a vampire hunter or soldier when compared with Full Spectrum Warrior, and wrote that instead his moves feel more similar to Mario. In contrast to Ritcher, Alucard's encounter with the villain was seen as more personal as the game explores the father and son relationship with heavy emphasis on Alucard's mental state as the dialogue he shares with Dracula embodies the theme of grief and identity. Another major area the two vampires share is the fate of Lisa, Alucard's mother and Dracula's wife, who none of the characters managed to surpass.

Kojima's design of Alucard from Symphony of the Night was noted to be highly popular within the audience to the point Polygon noticed it popularized the "vampire skin," which appeared as a full-blown trend in 2022. Writer Kazuma Hashimoto from the same website dressed as Alucard too, praising the design the character has. Artist Brock Otterbacher was fond of Kojima's designs, claiming "I had always come across and looked at her art, especially from the game. And this one image in particular that always kind of stuck out to me, which was an image of Alucard. His cape is part-bat, part-wolf, and that direct image is the inspiration for this. This was made years ago, I was like, 'Wow, I would love to someday get the opportunity to do the statue of this.'" Game Informer was in particular shocked by an Alucard cosplayer who managed to look nearly identical to his later incarnations.

Alucard's appearance in Aria of Sorrow and Dawn of Sorrow as Genya Arikado was also noted by reviewers. RPGamer celebrated how the greater concentration on supporting characters, including Arikado, were a welcome change from previous Castlevania games. RPGFan derided Arikado's "cool and impassive personality" as stereotypical, but praised the game's character development as setting him apart from previous supporting characters in the series. The switch to an anime style for the character designs in Dawn of Sorrow was notably criticized, as many reviewers preferred the designs made by Ayami Kojima. GameSpy deplored the "shallow, lifeless anime images" and IGN called the images "down to the level of 'generic Saturday morning Anime' quality." While noting his role in Symphony, James Paul Gee praised the handling of Alucard for coming across as one unique character due to how different he was from previous playable characters.

Comic Book Resources praised the handling of Alucard's characterization in the Lords of Shadow series for how he handles his relationship with his father even if the ending might come across as too tragic as both father and son appeared to hate their own nature and wanted to end the Belmont bloodline with their own lives. GameSpot said there was a major confusion about the identity of Alucard in Lords of Shadow due to him being first known as the hunter Trevor Belmont who dies fighting Dracula and later being revealed to have revived as Alucard in Mirror of Fate. In retrospect, GameSpot praised the handling of Alucard in the Lords of Shadow trilogy as the twist of Trevor being future Alucard subverted their expectations due to its emotional value. However, they criticized Dracula's and Alucard's final showdown in Lords of Shadow 2 as the both father and son fail to conquer their inner demons. Alucard's DLC Revelations was praised by the media for how different are Alucard's abilities from Dracula's as well as more entertaining.

The animated version of Alucard's characterization in Netflix's Castlevania series earned mixed responses, as he and his allies were overshadowed by Dracula's underlings, who were seen as more fleshed out cast members than Alucard. GameSpot agreed that the trio's appearances in the first episodes were underwhelming and that their relationship gets uninteresting quickly, as the cast spends most of their time interacting in a library. On the other hand, Blasting News felt that the second season of Castlevania gave more screen time to develop the chemistry between Alucard and his friends, in contrast to his brief role in the first season. A review from Destructoid expressed similar sentiments, largely due to the way Alucard and Trevor push aside their differences to defeat Dracula while insulting each other across the story, leaving good comic relief in the process. IGN felt that the relationship between Alucard and his father was one of the best aspects of the second season due to the performance of their voice actors. In an analysis from the franchise, E. Charlotte Stevens from Birmingham City University claimed that Alucard's gaming appearance make him noticeably androgynous, stylish and glammorised. Paul Martin noticed the character often shows signs of humanity despite the idea that he is a monster whereas the Netflix anime makes him look more sympathetic and lonely as a result of his father's death.

== See also ==
- List of fictional dhampirs
