= Castlevania: Lords of Shadow =

2010 video game

- European box art
- Developer: MercurySteam (Note: Kojima Productions assisted on development. Climax Studios ported the Windows version.)
- Publisher: Konami
- Director: Enric Álvarez
- Producers: Jose Raluy; Dave Cox; Hideo Kojima
- Artists: Juan Antonio Alcázar; Jose Luis Vaello
- Writers: Enric Álvarez; Dave Cox; Eddie Deighton
- Composer: Óscar Araujo
- Series: Castlevania
- Engine: Mercury Engine
- Platforms: PlayStation 3; Xbox 360; Windows
- Release: October 5, 2010: PlayStation 3, Xbox 360; NA: October 5, 2010; EU: October 8, 2010; AU: October 19, 2010; JP: December 16, 2010; Windows Steam; WW: August 27, 2013 Retail; WW: August 30, 2013
- Genres: Action-adventure, hack and slash
- Modes: Single-player, multiplayer

Castlevania: Lords of Shadow (Note: Known in Japan as Castlevania: Lords of Shadow (キャッスルヴァニア ロード オブ シャドウ, Kyassuruvania Rōdo obu Shadō)) is a 2010 action-adventure game developed by MercurySteam and published by Konami. It was released on October 5, 2010, for the PlayStation 3 and Xbox 360, with a Windows version released on August 27, 2013. The game is a reboot of the Castlevania series. Set in Southern Europe during the Middle Ages, the story focuses on Gabriel Belmont and his quest to defeat a malevolent order known as the Lords of Shadow and resurrect his wife. The player controls Gabriel in 3D environments as he uses melee skills to defeat enemies and solves puzzles to move through the game.

The game was originally announced as Lords of Shadow with no connection to the Castlevania series mentioned. This was done to keep their plans to radically change the direction of the Castlevania mythos a secret and to prevent the announcement of the game from upstaging another series release, Castlevania Judgment. Hideo Kojima, creator of the Metal Gear series, helped produce the title. The music was composed by Spanish composer Óscar Araujo, who was acclaimed for his work on the game.

The game sold well and received positive reviews from video game publications. It was praised for new elements it provided to the franchise, with particular praise for its story, combat, visuals, music, and art direction. Konami requested that the development team produce more titles related to Lords of Shadow. This includes two sequels titled Castlevania: Lords of Shadow – Mirror of Fate and Castlevania: Lords of Shadow 2.

== Gameplay ==
The player character Gabriel can use the Combat Cross to swing across gaps.

Lords of Shadow is a third-person action-adventure game in which the player controls the main character, Gabriel Belmont. The combat involves a retractable chain whip called the Combat Cross. The player can perform up to forty unlockable combos with it. The commands consist of direct attacks for dealing damage to single enemies, and weak area attacks when surrounded by them. It is also capable of interactions with secondary weapons, such as knives, holy water and other items which can be upgraded. In addition, the Combat Cross's melee skills can be combined with the Light and Shadow magic system, which are spells aimed at defense and aggression, respectively. The whip is upgradeable and can also be used to guard against an opponent's attack.

The developers attempted to reach out to new audiences by distancing Lords of Shadow from previous Castlevania games, but kept some elements intact to not alienate franchise fans. For example, vampires and werewolves are recurring enemies in the game, but other existing enemies include trolls, giant spiders and goblin-like creatures. The enemies can be defeated for experience points, which can be used to purchase combos or to augment the player's abilities further. Lords of Shadow has large-scale bosses known as titans. The Combat Cross can be used to grapple onto their bodies and navigate them, and break the runes that animate the titan.

Similar to the original Castlevania titles, platforming and puzzles are a key component and are featured in fifty levels. The player can control Gabriel to jump most distances, dash or hold his balance above fatal pits. The Combat Cross can be used for exploration purposes like scaling walls, rappelling and swinging across gaps. Some sequences of the game require the player to solve physical puzzles or brain teasers. Alternatively, moving certain objects can set off chain reactions and open paths to new areas. Activating switches can also assist against traps. The player can explore the levels in order to find hidden items, which can increase health or magic abilities. These items are "gems"; there are three types, including life gems, light gems and dark gems. These can increase life endurance, light magical ability and dark magical ability, respectively.

== Plot ==
=== Setting and characters ===
Producer David Cox stated the game is a reboot of the franchise. The setting of Lords of Shadow is during "the end of days" in the year 1047. The Earth's alliance with the Heavens has been threatened by a malevolent force known as the Lords of Shadow. A dark spell has stopped the souls of the deceased from leaving, while evil creatures inhabit the dying land and attack living people.

The main character, Gabriel Belmont (voiced by Robert Carlyle in English and Keiji Fujiwara in Japanese), is a member of the Brotherhood of Light, an elite group of holy knights who protect and defend innocent people against the supernatural creatures. Gabriel's wife Marie (Natascha McElhone / Kikuko Inoue) was brutally murdered by one of them, and her soul cannot leave as it is trapped in limbo. Because she is now neither alive nor dead, she realizes what is at stake and guides Gabriel to his destiny to save the world as he investigates the dark spell. He travels the destroyed land, meeting other characters, such as the oldest living member of his order, Zobek (Patrick Stewart (who additionally narrates the game in English) / Mugihito). Two masks referred to as the God and Devil Masks lie at the center of the plot, with the God Mask having powers to resurrect the dead. Gabriel intends to defeat the three factions of the Lords of Shadow in order to obtain the pieces of the God Mask and bring back his deceased wife.

=== Story ===
Gabriel is sent by the Brotherhood of Light to the Lake of Oblivion, where his deceased wife, Marie, tells him that Spirits who founded the Brotherhood said that the Lords of Shadow's power will save the world. Gabriel meets a man from the Brotherhood called Zobek, who states that a prophecy has been kept a secret by a select few, which tells of a pure-hearted warrior who will claim the Lords of Shadow's power to overcome evil. Zobek says that he and Gabriel must enter the lands of the Dark Lords in order to unite the Heavens with the world again, and that with this Gabriel can bring Marie back from the dead. Gabriel defeats the werewolf chief Cornell (Richard Ridings / Banjō Ginga) and the vampire queen Carmilla (Sally Knyvette / Houko Kuwashima) for the first two pieces of the God Mask on his journey, while learning that they were once two of the three founding members of the Order who fought the spawns of Satan in God's favor until they transformed into the Spirits, with power only second to God's. After they ascended to the Heavens, they left behind their dark sides, who were known as the Lords of Shadow.

Gabriel departs for the Land of the Necromancers for the last part of the mask. There, Zobek appears before Gabriel with the Devil Mask over his face, and divulges that he is the Lord of the Necromancers and that he grew tired of the Lords of Shadow dividing the power amongst the three of them. Orchestrating the events of the story, he searched Hell for this power until an evil force entered him and expanded his knowledge of the dark arts, which allowed him to cast the spell that separated the Earth from the Heavens so that the Spirits would contact the Brotherhood. Zobek discloses he used the Devil Mask on Gabriel to kill Marie and that all he needed was for Gabriel to restore the power of the Spirits to avoid suspicion from them. Satan (Jason Isaacs / Tomokazu Sugita) emerges and takes the God Mask from Zobek, revealing himself as the mastermind who gave Zobek his powers so that Satan could have revenge on God and return to the Heavens. Gabriel confronts Satan and defeats him, releasing souls of the deceased from limbo. Gabriel discovers the God Mask cannot bring Marie back and that it only allows him to see through God's eyes. Marie tells him he has been given a new life to redeem himself before she departs with the God Mask.

The story is expanded in two DLC packs titled Reverie and Resurrection. Reverie has Gabriel returning to Carmilla's castle to contain an ancient evil, the Forgotten One (Colin McFarlane), with the help of Carmilla's "daughter" Laura (Grace Vance / Yumi Sakura), who is also a playable character that assists Gabriel in some sequences of the DLC. Before entering a portal into the Forgotten One's prison, Laura tells Gabriel he cannot enter it in his mortal form and dies after she has Gabriel drink her blood to use its powers to enter, turning him into a vampire. During Resurrection, the Forgotten One aspires to destroy the humans' world, but he is defeated by Gabriel who claims his power for himself. Corrupted by the Forgotten One's power, Gabriel destroys his Combat Cross and leaves through the portal.

In a post-credits scene after the base game's ending, Zobek is seen alive during modern times, and has uncovered Gabriel living as a vampire called Dracula. Zobek mentions the acolytes of Satan are preparing for his return and that they must stop him before he takes revenge on both of them. Before Gabriel disappears, Zobek tells him he will free him of his immortality if he helps him.

== Development and release ==
Castlevania was rebooted due to Konami's concern over the poor sales of contemporary Castlevania games. The team wished to expand the franchise's fanbase with this installment. A number of prototypes in parallel development competed to become the next Castlevania title. The game was originally greenlit as a Castlevania title, but later Konami told MercurySteam the game would be an original intellectual property. Konami eventually asked them to cease work on Lords of Shadow while it was still in its early stages, until David Cox showed the Japanese senior management the game and was offered help by video game designer Hideo Kojima. Konami then chose the pitch for it as the next Castlevania entry. The original concept for the game was to remake the first Castlevania starring Simon Belmont, but it was later decided to make a reboot of the franchise. Lords of Shadow still drew inspiration from earlier titles in the series, most notably Castlevania for the Nintendo Entertainment System, and Super Castlevania IV.

Kojima's input included advising Cox's team to redesign some of the lead character, Gabriel, who he felt needed a "more heroic face". Originally, Gabriel's design resembled a classic barbarian, before Kojima then advised the staff to refine him into a character that was more relatable to the player. Cox mentioned that the voice acting provided by Robert Carlyle helped humanize Gabriel's character. Kojima also oversaw the Japanese localization of the game, employing a number of voice actors from the Japanese versions of Metal Gear Solid. Cox stated that Kojima otherwise allowed MercurySteam a lot of freedom with the project. MercurySteam wanted to depart from the art style of the other games in favour of one that was darker. Cox said, "The old games had this boyish depiction of vampires and monsters and we wanted them to have a darker edge this time around." VideoGamer.com drew comparisons between the art style and Guillermo del Toro's work.

The developers claimed to avoid the use of quick time events during combat, stating that they distracted the player from the action, but the game features many instances of them. When the game was 60% complete, MercurySteam was aiming for 30 frames per second performance, as opposed to 60 frames, which the company said was not a priority at that stage. The game reached gold status following an announcement on Twitter made by David Cox on September 9, 2010. The game's two downloadable content (DLC) episodes, Reverie and Resurrection, were released in February 2011 and June 2011 respectively to explain the twist from the story's ending. David Cox referred to these DLC chapters as "a mistake."

A port for Windows was announced in June 2013 with the subtitle of "Ultimate Edition". The downloadable content chapters are also included within the game. It was released through Steam on August 27, 2013, and in retail on August 30, 2013.

=== Audio ===
Castlevania: Lords of Shadow Soundtrack

Soundtrack album by Óscar Araujo
- Released: October 5, 2010 (North America)
- Genre: Video game soundtrack

The game's musical score was written by Spanish composer Óscar Araujo using a 120-piece orchestra. It also features previous Castlevania musical themes. A soundtrack CD was also included in limited editions of the game, with twenty tracks in total. In October 2013, specialist label Sumthing Else Music Works issued the soundtrack in a more widely available CD release while selling a digital format of the previously issued tracks that were featured on the CD that came with collector's editions of the game alongside additional material exclusive to the digital release. Araujo was nominated by the International Film Music Critics Association for breakout composer of the year for his work on Lords of Shadow. He won "Best Original Score for a Video Game or Interactive Media."

Track listing
No.	Title	Length
1.	"Besieged Village"	4:23
2.	"The Warg"	3:26
3.	"Hunting Path"	2:28
4.	"The Dead Bog"	2:31
5.	"The Swamp Troll"	5:03
6.	"The Ice Titan"	4:12
7.	"Labyrinth Entrance"	3:17
8.	"Waterfalls of Agharta"	2:45
9.	"Agharta"	1:27
10.	"Cornell"	4:12
11.	"Maze Gardens"	3:19
12.	"Castle Hall"	4:09
13.	"The Evil Butcher"	4:10
14.	"Laura's Mercy"	1:38
15.	"Carmilla"	2:03
16.	"The God Mask"	1:18
17.	"Belmont's Theme"	2:53
18.	"The Last Battle"	6:09
19.	"The End"	5:47
20.	"Love Lost"	1:27

Lords of Shadow features voiced dialogue by a professional cast recorded in London, an aspect which has been acclaimed by the gaming press. The cast includes Robert Carlyle and Patrick Stewart. The part of Gabriel was originally going to be offered to Gerard Butler, but he was not available. The cast would make their own contributions to the characters during the recordings. David Cox mentioned that "What could have been an 'in and out' voiceover job for them [the voice actors] wasn't. Instead, their love of the script and praise saw them developing their characters and working through the motivations for them".

== Reception ==
Reception

Aggregate scores
Aggregator	Score
Metacritic	(PS3) 85/100 (X360) 83/100 (PC) 81/100
OpenCritic	70% recommend

Review scores
Publication	Score
1Up.com	B
Computer and Video Games	9.2/10
Edge	8/10
Eurogamer	8/10
Famitsu	9/10, 8/10, 9/10, 9/10
G4	4/5
Game Informer	9/10
GameSpot	7.5/10
GameSpy	4/5
GamesRadar+	9/10
GameTrailers	7.9/10
IGN	7.5/10
PlayStation Official Magazine – UK	9/10
Official Xbox Magazine (US)	9/10
PSM3	94%
VideoGamer.com	9/10

Awards
Publication	Award
GamesMaster	Gold Award
Xbox World 360	Star Player Accolade
Film Music Critics Association	Best Original Score for a Video Game or Interactive Media

During its development, Lords of Shadow was placed on several lists for most anticipated video games. GameTrailers ranked it at number 7 for "Top 10 Most Anticipated Games of 2010." GamesRadar+ placed Lords of Shadow at number 26 for 100 Most Anticipated Games of 2010, stating that "This could be a megaton release." 1UP.com's top 50 most anticipated games of E3 2010 ranked Lords of Shadow at number 17. Despite the heavy anticipation, Cox noted there was still a small number of fans who did not like the game's transition to the 3D format. He stated, "Fair enough, some people aren't going to like what we're doing and we accept that but generally what we're trying to do is bring the fans with us ... there's no point in going back and making the same game again – the point is to make a clean break and move forward with the series."

Reaction to Lords of Shadow was highly positive. 1UP.com's review praised how the game took elements from other series and executed them well. GamesRadar+ drew favorable comparisons to other action games it has given a perfect score, including God of War III, Bayonetta and Dante's Inferno, while praising it for being "huge in scope, length, and depth, and it's polished with obvious love and passion". Official Xbox Magazine lauded the size of the game's content, writing "... [it] is big. Actually, big's too little a word. It's monolithic... From the Resi 4 mood of the scarecrow puzzle to the unexpected oddity of the music box level, this is a game that seemingly hasn't heard of DLC – and decides to offer you immense value for money instead." The publication concluded it was otherwise a success. Other reviews noted that it was derivative of other games and that it was unlike the classic Castlevania series. GameSpot's review calls the game "a good start for a series in need of some new blood – so to speak – it's just unfortunate so much of it comes from other games and not an original source." IGN found the combat repetitive but felt the puzzles and platforming provided good pacing. Game Informer's Tim Turi praised its boss battles, its magic-based combat system, and its story. GameZone ranked it as the sixth best Castlevania title. The staff praised the developers' success at bringing Castlevania to 3D.

Xbox World 360 awarded the game the "Star Player Accolade" in 2010. GamesMaster also gave it the "Gold Award."

The game was a commercial success. By November 2010 Konami had shipped one million copies in North America and Europe. Despite not achieving a high rank on the sales chart, Konami was satisfied with the game's sales considering the budget it had and the staff's intentions. The game also became the best-selling Castlevania game, which resulted in Konami's request to produce more titles. Because of the game's success, Lords of Shadow is seen as the start of a possible second golden age of Spanish software.

== Sequels ==
On May 29, 2012, Nintendo Power magazine revealed a sequel to Lords of Shadow for the Nintendo 3DS was in development by MercurySteam, titled Castlevania: Lords of Shadow – Mirror of Fate. The game takes place 25 years after Lords of Shadow and features 2.5D gameplay. It follows Trevor Belmont, Simon Belmont, Alucard and Gabriel Belmont at different points in history.

On May 31, 2012, Konami announced the sequel at E3 2012, Castlevania: Lords of Shadow 2. The game stars Gabriel as Dracula while he seeks to regain his lost powers in order to fight the Belmonts and the return of Satan. Mirror of Fate has a climax that sets up the events of Lords of Shadow 2.
