= Castlevania: Lords of Shadow 2 =

2014 video game

- Developer: MercurySteam
- Publisher: Konami
- Director: Enric Álvarez
- Producer: Dave Cox
- Composer: Óscar Araujo
- Series: Castlevania
- Engine: Mercury Engine
- Platforms: PlayStation 3 Windows; Xbox 360
- Release: NA: February 25, 2014; EU: February 28, 2014; AU: March 6, 2014; JP: September 4, 2014
- Genres: Action-adventure, hack and slash
- Mode: Single-player

Castlevania: Lords of Shadow 2 (Note: Known in Japan as Akumajō Dracula: Lords of Shadow 2 (悪魔城ドラキュラ ロード オブ シャドウ2, Akumajō Dorakyura Rōdo obu Shadō Tsu)) is a 2014 action-adventure game developed by MercurySteam and published by Konami. It is a sequel to the 2010 title Castlevania: Lords of Shadow, which served as a reboot of the Castlevania franchise. The game was released late February 2014 in both North America and Europe and in March 2014 in Australia. Lords of Shadow 2 was released on September 4, 2014, in Japan. A downloadable chapter has also been released in March from the same year.

The story is set in both medieval and modern worlds and follows a weakened Dracula on a quest to defeat his former enemy, Satan. Gameplay takes place after the original Lords of Shadow but this time through an open world. The player controls Dracula who uses multiple powers and weapons to achieve his goals. Lords of Shadow 2 received mixed opinions from critics, while it was praised for its combat and visuals, the narrative and forced stealth gameplay were criticized.

== Gameplay ==
As in the previous game, the player controls Gabriel Belmont, now known as Dracula. During the game's opening sequence the player is able to control Dracula while he still possesses all his powers as well as all of his weapons. Dracula's main weapon is his Shadow Whip, a weapon that is comparable to the Combat Cross from the original Lords of Shadow. Replacing the magic system from the previous game are the Void Sword and the Chaos Claws. The Void Sword can replenish Dracula's health when used while the Chaos Claws can be used to break through enemy defenses and deliver powerful attacks. Other new abilities include shapeshifting into a rat to hide from enemies or travel through vents, turning into an intangible mist to pass through bars or fly/glide to higher platforms, possessing enemies for a few seconds to pass through secure doors, and drinking the blood of an enemy to replenish some health. The story mode in Lords of Shadow 2 has been stated to be far longer than the previous one. The game is mainly an open world, allowing the player to choose what route to take. Lords of Shadow 2 features a movable camera, something that was not available in its predecessor.

== Plot ==
The game starts out with a recap of Lords of Shadow and Mirror of Fate, detailing Gabriel Belmont's (Robert Carlyle) transformation into Dracula and his encounters with his son, Trevor (Richard Madden), whom he kills and subsequently resurrects, and grandson, Simon. The game starts in the 16th century with knights attacking Dracula's castle. He swiftly dispatches all of them before being confronted by the revived Trevor, now known as Alucard.

Centuries later, Dracula awakens in a cathedral in modern times, weak from starvation and with no memory of the circumstances that led to him being there. He is warned by his former enemy, Zobek (Patrick Stewart), of the return of Satan, who until then was deterred from doing so by Dracula himself. Zobek offers him his old weapon, the Vampire Killer (the Combat Cross from the first game), the only relic capable of ending his cursed existence, in exchange for him vanquishing the "acolytes" trying to bring Satan (Jason Isaacs) back. The key to him regaining his power lies in his castle, which the cursed blood that kept it alive for centuries attempts to deter Dracula of his quest. Throughout his journey, Dracula is aided by various allies, including Zobek's bodyguard and specters of his deceased wife Marie (Natascha McElhone) and a younger Trevor. He also encounters the Brotherhood of Light and its current leader, Victor Belmont (Anthony Howell).

Having destroyed two of the acolytes and tracked down the third, Dracula prepares to ambush him but is stopped by the bodyguard, flashing back to his last encounter with Alucard. It is revealed that centuries ago, Alucard had come to Dracula with a plan to destroy both Zobek and Satan, using his sword, the Crissaegrim (created from a shard of the Vampire Killer), on him to induce a deep sleep and thus setting the current events into motion. The truth now known, the bodyguard reveals himself to be Alucard. Zobek discovers their treachery and angrily confronts them both. Dracula kills him just as the third acolyte summons Satan, who proceeds to summon a flying monster to destroy the human world. Dracula and Alucard are able to kill the beast, only for Satan to possess the latter, forcing father and son to battle. Dracula gains the upper hand and prepares to stake Alucard with the Vampire Killer, despite Satan's insistence that he would not and forcing him to vacate the body. Having anticipated this, Dracula kills Satan once and for all while saving his son. Dracula then destroys the Mirror of Fate and walks back inside his cathedral with Alucard as the sun rises on the city.

== Development ==
The game was announced at E3 2012. The developers' intention was to play as Dracula for the first time in the Castlevania series and conclude the storyline started in the first Lords of Shadow. Although the previous game was well-received, the designers noted it had several flaws which they wanted to fix while improving the gameplay. This includes reducing the game's over-reliance on quick time events, removing the fixed camera in favor of a 360 field, and improving the framerate. Rather than recycling elements from previous games, the team decided to redesign the game engine. The developers also felt Lords of Shadow was too linear, which introduced another change for the sequel: it will have an open world to give players a sense of exploration and avoid transitions between levels. Despite an initially linear path, players will be given multiple options as they progress. This was also intended to contrast with other action series such as Tenchu, Legacy of Kain and Devil May Cry. Designing the modern setting created difficulties for the developers. The team had previously done open world games but were disappointed with their quality and believe Lords of Shadow 2 will be an improvement over those.

In a June 2012 interview with Nintendo Life regarding Mirror of Fate during E3 at the time, Lords of Shadow producer Dave Cox stated there were no plans to release Castlevania: Lords of Shadow 2 on Nintendo's then upcoming Wii U console. Cox and Konami reaffirmed this several months later after the Wii U launched, citing lack of resources for porting the game.

On February 12, 2014, a demo was made available on the PlayStation Network, Xbox Live and Steam.

Following the game's release, reports surfaced from anonymous sources stating to be developers at MercurySteam concerning the game's development. One source alleged that the development process had been "a degree of 'hell'", and laid the blame upon the game's director, Enric Álvarez. Álvarez, it was alleged, led the development "based on his personal criteria", while "completely overlooking programmers, designers and artists." A second source corroborated this information, bemoaning the lack of trust, leadership and communication between the teams working on the game. This source suggested that José Luis Vaello, a former art director at MercurySteam, left the studio for Tequila Works due to the conditions described. Álvarez denied the claims on Twitter stating "Is sad [to] see people giving credit to the lies and insults from an enraged ex-worker."

== Downloadable content ==
On March 25, 2014, the first and only downloadable content episode was released, entitled "Revelations". The story serves as a prequel to the main game and focuses on Dracula's son, Alucard who is on a quest to reclaim the Void Sword and Chaos Claws for his father when he awakens. Alucard plays similarly to Dracula, but has abilities unique to him such as Bat Cloud which allows him to teleport to hard-to-reach places, Timeless Vision which lets him temporarily reverse time, and Spectral Wolf which allows him to get past certain obstacles.

The game also provides a pair of cosmetic skins for Dracula named "Dark Dracula" and "Armored Dracula." Dark Dracula alters the features of the physical appearance of Dracula's body, causing him to more closely resemble Alucard, with white hair, black eyes, and paler skin. Armored Dracula provides a different look for Dracula's clothes, resembling the clothing the character wore in the original Lords of Shadow, but with a more armored appearance. The two skins can be combined, resulting in "Dark Armored Dracula". The skins also have effects on the in-game dialogue spoken by Dracula when he is shown looking at a massive tome referred to in game as the Book of Dracul, during periods when a player resumes play after taking a break from the game, though they do not otherwise affect in-game or cinematic dialogue.

== Reception ==
Reception

Aggregate score
Aggregator	Score
Metacritic	58/100 (PC); 63/100 (PS3); 70/100 (X360)

Review scores
Publication	Score
Edge	4/10
Eurogamer	5/10
GameSpot	7/10
IGN	6.5/10
Joystiq	4/5
Play	81%

The game received generally mixed reception from critics, review aggregation website Metacritic scored the game 58/100, 63/100 and 70/100 across the three platforms.

Play was full of praise for the combat, describing it as "simply awesome" and "[an] impressive, flowing combat system". Play commented how the skill progression system forced players to vary their attacks, a mechanic that GameSpot felt "delays your effectiveness in battle somewhat", but "[opened] the game up to different types of combat strategies." The bosses in the game drew particular attention from multiple reviews; GameSpot described these "grotesque monstrosities" as "bringing to mind some of the best designs from film director Guillermo del Toro's work". Eurogamer highlighted the fight against the Toy Maker boss as a place where "the whole game suddenly shudders to life" and "a delight to be a part of", but felt that these levels of enjoyment could not be maintained through the game. IGN too enjoyed the boss fights, but felt that the standard enemy designs were "bland and boring" and some did not fit the Castlevania series at all.

Reactions to the game's visuals were mixed. Critics generally praised the medieval castle setting but were let down by the modern day city environments. Joystiq described the environments as "of almost equal spectacle" to the bosses, the castle "home to breathtaking views", but something the city could not live up to. Play felt similarly, writing that the game surpassed the original Lords of Shadow in its visuals, though the "grey and familiar" modern day settings failed to "match the majesty" of Dracula's castle. Eurogamer's Digital Foundry praised the game's technical performance across the three platforms, comparing it favourably to the original Lords of Shadow. They concluded that "huge strides have been made" and the game could produce a "sustained 30fps during both light exploration and heavy combat." Digital Foundry felt that the Xbox 360 and PlayStation 3 versions both offered "the same graphical and gameplay experience throughout", but "the ability to run at 60fps easily makes the PC game the most attractive."

The Edge review was highly critical, highlighting the failings of the stealth sections, the "unimaginative visual design" of the modern era, and the poor pacing. Even the combat mechanics, described by Edge as the game's sole saving grace, were judged to fall short of its inspirations, such as the God of War series. In an interview with Eurogamer Spain, Enric Álvarez, the game's director, complained that the Edge review was "terribly unfair", and that "one must be blind or stupid to give a 4/10 mark to a game with this quality". Álvarez believed that the game's poorer critical response compared to the original Lords of Shadow was due to the heightened expectations of a sequel. Still, on the whole, Álvarez said of the reception, "I tend to think positive after reading some things. I'm glad that some people are writing about games instead of making them."

In Russia, the game received mixed reviews. Alexei Makarenkov of Igromania magazine said that he considers this game a clone of God of War. Tony Vilgotsky wrote in Darker that Lords of Shadow 2 is one of the best dark games of the year.

Enric Alvarez stated in an interview with Eurogamer that the game sold well, but not as well as the first game.
