= Castlevania Judgment =

2008 video game

- North American box art
- Developer: Eighting
- Publisher: Konami
- Directors: Akihiro Minakata; Yuta Kobayashi
- Producer: Koji Igarashi
- Artist: Takeshi Obata
- Composer: Yasushi Asada
- Series: Castlevania
- Platform: Wii
- Release: NA: November 18, 2008; JP: January 15, 2009; EU: March 20, 2009; AU: April 2, 2009
- Genre: Fighting
- Modes: Single-player, multiplayer

Castlevania Judgment (Note: known in Japan as Demon Castle Dracula Judgment (悪魔城ドラキュラ ジャッジメント, Akumajō Dorakyura Jajjimento)) is a 2008 fighting game developed by Eighting and published by Konami for the Wii. The game is based on the Castlevania series of games, and is the series's first fighting game.

== Gameplay ==
A fight between Simon and Alucard

The game features 3D environments, and uses the motion-sensing controls of the Wii Remote and Nunchuk. The Wii Remote is used for attacks, including basic attacks, "sub-weapons" and weapon attacks, by swinging the remote, and the Nunchuck is used to move the character around the stage and for defensive moves. Players can move freely around a stage, similar to the game Power Stone.

Each character utilizes different weapons and different types of weapons that are available depending on the stage and interactive environment of the stage; also, they can set traps or use monsters in the stage to attack one another. Summons are available in combat, some of which can be caused by items. Players are able to make use of the Nintendo Wi-Fi connection to play against each other, and can connect with the Nintendo DS game Castlevania: Order of Ecclesia to unlock bonus content in both games. Examples of stages include the Throne Room, Torture Chamber and the Ghost Ship. Players can choose to pick a different palette color for their chosen character, referred to in the game as "alignment color", two of which apply accessories chosen by the player.

=== Characters ===
Judgment features 14 playable characters, made up of 13 heroes and bosses from throughout the Castlevania franchise's history, along with the new original character Aeon.

Other non-playable characters roam the game's stages, serving as obstacles that can be eliminated to replenish energy. These characters include common Castlevania enemies such as zombies, mermen and minotaurs.

- Aeon (original)
- Alucard (Dracula's Curse)
- Carmilla (Simon's Quest)
- Cornell (Legacy of Darkness)
- Death (Castlevania)
- Dracula (Castlevania)
- Eric Lecarde (Bloodlines)
- Golem (Haunted Castle)
- Grant Danasty (Dracula's Curse)
- Maria Renard (Rondo of Blood)
- Sypha Belnades (Dracula's Curse)
- Shanoa (Order of Ecclesia)
- Simon Belmont (Castlevania)
- Trevor Belmont (Dracula's Curse)

== Plot ==
Galamoth plots to send his servant, the Time Reaper, from ten millennia in the future into the past to destroy his rival Dracula and change history. A man named Aeon discovers this and pulls together champions from different eras of history into a time rift, in order to find a chosen one capable of destroying the Time Reaper. Each character has their own unique storyline, cutscenes and ending sequence when playing through the game's story mode.

== Development ==
Konami registered a game called Castlevania Judgment with the United States Patent and Trademark Office on April 11, 2008. The game's lead designer, Koji Igarashi, began planning to bring a Castlevania game to the Wii, and wanted to utilize the motion sensing controllers. To do so in a prolonged adventure story, however, would have been very tiring, since much of the franchise's gameplay involves whipping and swinging. But in an action setting, the swinging motion would be broken up with resting intervals and be more enjoyable. The game is focused on recreating the Gothic feel of the franchise. Igarashi described the process of developing multiplayer combat as a somewhat challenging task. The design team worked on the game's graphics, especially in-game textures, with some of the designers of Elebits and Dewy's Adventure who joined Igarashi's development team. The characters were all given new redesigns for the game by manga artist Takeshi Obata.

== Reception ==
Reception

Aggregate scores
Aggregator	Score
GameRankings	51.59%
Metacritic	49/100

Review scores
Publication	Score
1Up.com	D−
Eurogamer	3/10
G4	1/5
Game Informer	5/10
GamePro	1.5/5
GameRevolution	D
GameSpot	3/10
GameSpy	1.5/5
GameTrailers	6.5/10
IGN	7.5/10
Nintendo Power	7/10
Nintendo World Report	7/10
Official Nintendo Magazine	68%
X-Play	1/5

Initial reaction to the announcement that the game would be a fighting game was received by some with shock and skepticism. IGN's initial viewing of the pre-E3 build of the game made their reviewers conclude the game had promise. However, the character design was harshly criticised by David Oxford of Kombo.com, who thought the design was not in the style of Castlevania and too similar to Obata's work on Death Note.

After being shown at the 2008 edition of the Tokyo Game Show, the game received generally harsh criticism. Kotaku editor Luke Plunkett wrote a long hands-on article about the game. He reported "I walked away from the show feeling bad. Bad for Castlevania fans, at least" and "There is just nothing right about this game. Nothing." Game designer Koji Igarashi had complaints about the control scheme, reporting that "There's also the issue of the Wii controller. It's difficult to do those sorts of precise movements when you're waving something around." He otherwise objected that the initial reaction to Judgment was "unfair."

The reception of Judgment was negative, holding a total rating of 49% on Metacritic. Gaming website 1UP.com rated the game a D−. In addition to criticism about the art direction, 1UP also noted some things that they said disregarded established fighting conventions. This included complaints about the "disorientating" camera control. According to the review Konami had described the game as "Versus Action" which is said by the reviewer to be "an amalgamation that fuses action-game mechanics with a fighter" and then goes on to call the term "the bastard son of neologism". IGN called Judgment a "deep, fun fighter", praising the variety of characters, style and design, while criticizing the camera and lack of control customization possibilities. IGN also nominated it for Best Fighting Game of 2008 for the Wii, but it lost the award to Super Smash Bros. Brawl. Nintendo Power rated the game a 7.0/10, stating that "In spite of being radically different from its action-adventure predecessors, however, Castlevania Judgement is actually pretty fun", praising its presentation, accessibility, and remixed music, while criticising the implementation of sub-weapons, the control scheme, and the character designs, calling them "questionable". In contrast, X-Play gave the game 1/5, claiming it to be enormously unbalanced and having an awful control scheme, as well as "bastardizing established Castlevania designs". GameSpy gave the game 1.5/5, praising the game for its unlockables and its online mode, while criticizing the game for unbalanced characters and irritating camera. GameSpot gave the game a 3/10 score stating "The abhorrent camera, dreadful art, and cumbersome controls are for masochistic applicants only; fans of the franchise, fighting, or fun will find nothing of value in this sloppy cash-in." Following its later release in Japan, the game was a financial bomb, having only sold 3,700 units.
