= Robert Carlyle =

Scottish actor (born 1961)

Robert Carlyle OBE
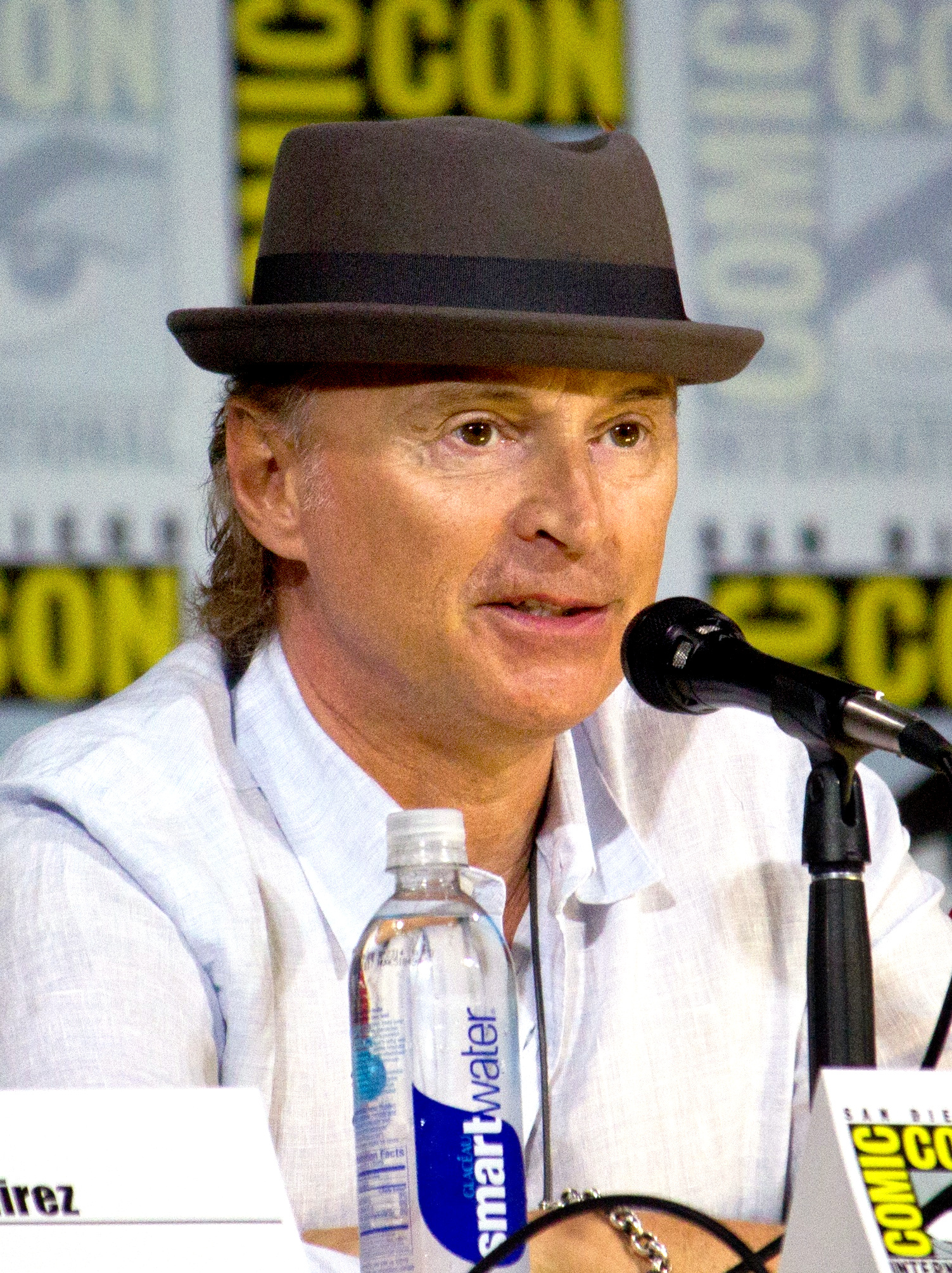
- Carlyle at the 2017 San Diego Comic-Con
- Born: 14 April 1961 (age 65); Maryhill, Glasgow, Scotland
- Education: Royal Scottish Academy of Music and Drama
- Occupation: Actor
- Years active: 1990–present
- Spouse: Anastasia Shirley (m. 1997)
- Children: 3

Robert Carlyle OBE (born 14 April 1961) is a Scottish actor. His film work includes: Trainspotting (1996), The Full Monty (1997), Ravenous and The World Is Not Enough (both 1999), There's Only One Jimmy Grimble (2000), The Beach (2000), The 51st State (2001), Eragon (2006), 28 Weeks Later (2007) and The Legend of Barney Thomson (2015). He has starred in television series such as Hamish Macbeth (1995–1998), Stargate Universe (2009–2011), Once Upon a Time (2011–2018) and COBRA (2020–2023).

He won the BAFTA Award for Best Actor in a Leading Role for The Full Monty and a Gemini Award for Stargate Universe, and was nominated for an Emmy Award for his work in the miniseries Human Trafficking (2005). Carlyle also earned plaudits for playing King James VI and I in the BBC miniseries Gunpowder, Treason & Plot (2004).

== Early life and education ==
Robert Carlyle was born on 14 April 1961 in Maryhill, Glasgow, the son of Elizabeth, who worked for a bus company, and Joseph Carlyle, a painter and decorator. He was raised by his father after his mother left when he was four years old.

Carlyle left North Kelvinside Secondary School at the age of 16 without any qualifications and worked for his father as a painter and decorator. He later attended night classes at Cardonald College, in Glasgow. He first became involved in drama at the Glasgow Arts Centre at the age of 21 (having been inspired by reading Arthur Miller's The Crucible) and he later graduated from the Royal Scottish Academy of Music and Drama (RSAMD).

== Career ==
In 1990, Carlyle, Alexander Morton, Caroline Paterson, and friends founded a theatre company, Raindog (which was involved in television and film work). The same year he guest starred in The Bill and also starred in his first film, Riff-Raff, directed by Ken Loach.

In 1994, he played the lover of Father Greg in the film Priest. Carlyle's first high-profile role came as serial killer Albie Kinsella in an October 1994 episode of Cracker opposite Robbie Coltrane and Christopher Eccleston. Carlyle claimed that his main inspiration for the role was Robert De Niro's Academy Award-nominated performance as Travis Bickle in Taxi Driver. This highly acclaimed role showcased Carlyle's "pure intensity". Shortly after his appearance in Cracker, he landed the role of Highland policeman Hamish Macbeth in the BBC comedy-drama Hamish Macbeth. The series ran for three seasons from 1995 to 1997.

In 1996 and 1997, he appeared in the two highest-profile roles of his career to date: as the sociopathic Francis Begbie in Trainspotting and Gaz, the leader of a group of amateur male strippers, in The Full Monty. The latter earned Carlyle a BAFTA Award for Best Actor in a Leading Role. He also starred with Ray Winstone in the 1997 film Face. Carlyle played the senior Malachy McCourt (father of author Frank McCourt) in the 1999 film adaptation of McCourt's first memoir, Angela's Ashes; the arch villain Renard in the 1999 James Bond film The World Is Not Enough; and a cannibalistic soldier in the 1999 Ravenous.

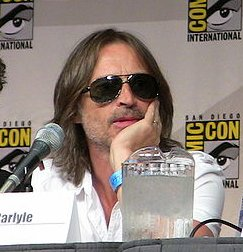
Robert Carlyle in July 2009

Carlyle appeared in the 2002 Oasis music video for "Little By Little". He played Adolf Hitler in the 2003 miniseries Hitler: The Rise of Evil, portraying the future dictator's rise to power. In 2006 he played the villain Durza in Eragon. In 2007 Carlyle played one of the main characters in the film 28 Weeks Later. He also played the lead role as a marine engineer attempting to save London from total devastation in the disaster film Flood. That year he also portrayed Father Joseph Macavoy in the film The Tournament.

In 2008 Carlyle narrated a BBC audiobook version of The Cutting Room. In 2008, he was cast as Dr. Nicholas Rush in the television series Stargate Universe. His was touted by the studio as the "leading role" in Universe.

In 2008, Carlyle appeared in 24: Redemption, a television movie based on the TV series 24, starring alongside Kiefer Sutherland.

In 2009, Carlyle appeared in "The Man Who Walked Around The World", a long-form commercial for Johnnie Walker whisky. Carlyle was shown walking down a path and talking for six minutes in a single long take. The ad took two days to film. The director, Jamie Rafn, afterwards referred to Carlyle as an "utter genius".

He voices the character of Gabriel Belmont, and his counterpart, Dracula, in the video game Castlevania: Lords of Shadow, as well as its sequels Mirror of Fate and Lords of Shadow 2.

From 2011 to 2018, Carlyle portrayed Rumplestiltskin / Mr. Gold in the fantasy-drama television series Once Upon a Time. The character is a wizard, deal-maker, and master manipulator. In an interview, Carlyle explained that his son inspired him to create Rumplestiltskin's voice.

In 2019, he portrayed Ogilvy in a three-part television adaptation of The War of the Worlds for the BBC, and made an uncredited appearance as John Lennon in the film Yesterday. From 2020 to 2023, he portrayed Robert Sutherland, the Prime Minister and Leader of the Conservative Party in the Sky series Cobra. In 2023, he reprised his role as Gaz for the sequel series to The Full Monty, and appeared in the 2025 Netflix drama Toxic Town.

Carlyle's upcoming roles include Jack Ruby, the killer of Lee Harvey Oswald in the film November 1963, DCS Dave Cook in The Hack, an ITVX drama about the News International phone hacking scandal, and Sherlock Holmes in the second season of the CBS series Watson.

=== Acting style ===
Known for his commitment to authenticity in roles, Carlyle has often altered his lifestyle and physical appearance to gain a better understanding of a character; much akin to method acting. Before playing a homeless character in Antonia Bird's Safe, for example, he went to live in the Waterloo area of London where the film was set. For his role as a bus driver in Ken Loach's Carla's Song, he passed the test for a PSV licence (a licence to drive a bus with passengers) in a Glasgow Leyland Atlantean bus. Carlyle also had dentistry as part of his preparations for reprising his role as Begbie in T2 Trainspotting, choosing to have a dental implant and an adjacent tooth that became damaged during the implant's removal, extracted. Writing of Carlyle's performance in The Full Monty, Andrew Johnston stated: "Carlyle was brilliant as the savage psycho Begbie in Trainspotting; here, he proves he can be almost as good when kept on a short leash. We don't know much about Gaz, but he's the most interesting character in the movie, largely because of Carlyle's down-to-earth warmth."

== Personal life ==
Carlyle has been married to make-up artist Anastasia Shirley since 1997. They have three children: a daughter born in 2002, and two sons born in 2004 and 2006. Carlyle is a patron of 'School for Life' in Romania. He was appointed an OBE in 1999.

== Filmography ==
=== Film ===
Year	Title	Role	Notes
1990	Silent Scream	Big Woodsy	
1990	Riff-Raff	Steve	
1993	Being Human	Prehistoric Shaman	
1994	Priest	Graham	
1994	Marooned	Peter	
1995	Go Now	Nick Cameron	
1996	Trainspotting	Francis "Franco" Begbie	
1996	Carla's Song	George Lennox	
1997	The Full Monty	Gary "Gaz" Schofield	
1997	Face	Ray	
1999	Plunkett & Macleane	Will Plunkett	
1999	Ravenous	Colonel Ives / F.W. Colqhoun	
1999	The World Is Not Enough	Renard (Viktor Zokas)	
1999	Angela's Ashes	Malachy McCourt	
2000	The Beach	Daffy	
2000	There's Only One Jimmy Grimble	Eric Wirral	
2001	To End All Wars	Major Ian Campbell	
2001	The 51st State	Felix DeSouza	
2002	Once Upon a Time in the Midlands	Jimmy	
2002	Black and White	David O'Sullivan	
2004	Dead Fish	Danny Devine	
2005	The Mighty Celt	O	
2005	Marilyn Hotchkiss' Ballroom Dancing and Charm School	Frank Keane	
2006	Eragon	Durza	
2007	28 Weeks Later	Donald "Don" Harris	
2007	Flood	Robert Morrison	
2008	Stone of Destiny	John MacCormick	
2008	Summer	Shaun	
2008	I Know You Know	Charlie	
2009	The Tournament	Father Joseph MacAvoy	
2009	The Unloved	Lucy's Father	
2012	California Solo	Lachlan MacAldonich	
2015	The Legend of Barney Thomson	Barney Thomson	Also director
2016	All That Remains	Violin player	
2017	T2 Trainspotting	Francis "Franco" Begbie	
2019	Yesterday	John Lennon	Uncredited
2022	North of Normal	Papa Dick	
2023	The Performance	Fugler	
TBA	November 1963	Jack Ruby	

=== Television ===
Key
†	Denotes works that have not yet been released

Year	Title	Role	Notes
1990	Taggart	Gordon Inglis	Episode: "Hostile Witness"
1991	The Bill	Tom Ward	Episode: "The Better Part of Valour"
1993	Screenplay	Nosty	Episode: "Safe"
1994	99-1	Detective Constable Trevor Prescott	Episode: "Doing the Business"
1994	Cracker	Albie Kinsella	Serial: "To Be a Somebody"
1995–1998	Hamish Macbeth	Hamish Macbeth	20 episodes
1998	Looking After Jo Jo	John Joe "Jo Jo" McCann	
2001	Chewin' the Fat	Himself	Hogmanay Special
2003	Hitler: The Rise of Evil	Adolf Hitler	
2004	Gunpowder, Treason & Plot	King James I	Television film
2005	Human Trafficking	Sergei Karpovich	
2005	Class of '76	Detective Inspector Tom Monroe	Television film
2006	Born Equal	Robert	Television film
2008	The Last Enemy	David Russell	5 episodes
2008	24: Redemption	Carl Benton	Television film
2009	The Unloved	Father	Television film
2009	The Man Who Walked Around the World	Himself	Advert for Johnnie Walker
2009	Zig Zag Love	Jacko	Television film
2009–2011	Stargate Universe	Doctor Nicholas Rush	40 episodes
2011–2018	Once Upon a Time	Rumplestiltskin / Mr. Gold / Weaver	138 episodes
2019	The War of the Worlds	Ogilvy	Miniseries
2020–2023	COBRA	Robert Sutherland	Lead role
2023	The Full Monty	Gary "Gaz" Schofield	Lead role
2025	Toxic Town	Sam Hagen	4 episodes
2025	Watson	Sherlock Holmes	Recurring role
2025	The Hack	Dave Cook	Main role
† TBA	Line of Duty	Detective Constable Shaun Massie	Main role, series 7

=== Video games ===
Year	Title	Voice role	Notes
2006	Eragon	Shade Durza	
2010	Castlevania: Lords of Shadow	Gabriel Belmont	
2013	Castlevania: Lords of Shadow – Mirror of Fate	Gabriel Belmont / Dracula	
2014	Castlevania: Lords of Shadow 2	Gabriel Belmont / Dracula / Inner Dracula	
2014	Watch Dogs	Stephen Fedder	

=== Audio books ===
Year	Title	Role	Notes
2008	The Cutting Room	Narrator	

== Awards and nominations ==
Year	Award	Category	Work	Result
1993	BAFTA Scotland Awards	Best Actor – Film	Riff-Raff	Nominated
1995	BAFTA Scotland Awards	Best Actor – Television	Cracker & Hamish Macbeth	Won
1995	CableACE Awards	Supporting Actor in a Movie or Miniseries	Cracker	Nominated
1996	Awards Circuit Community Awards	Best Actor in a Supporting Role	Trainspotting	Nominated
1996	Royal Television Society Awards	Best Actor	Hamish Macbeth	Won
1997	British Academy Film Awards	Best Actor in a Leading Role	The Full Monty	Won
1997	BAFTA Scotland Awards	Best Actor – Television	Hamish Macbeth	Nominated
1997	BAFTA Scotland Awards	Best Actor – Film	Trainspotting	Nominated
1997	Evening Standard British Film Awards	Best Actor	Face, Carla's Song & The Full Monty	Won
1997	London Film Critics' Circle Awards	British Actor of the Year	Face, Carla's Song & The Full Monty	Won
1997	Salerno Shadowline Film Festival	Shadowline Award		Won
1997	Golden Satellite Awards	Best Supporting Actor – Drama	Trainspotting	Nominated
1997	Screen Actors Guild Awards	Outstanding Performance by a Cast in a Motion Picture (with Mark Addy, Paul Barber, Deirdre Costello, Steve Huison, Bruce Jones, Lesley Sharp, William Snape, Hugo Speer, Tom Wilkinson & Emily Woof)	The Full Monty	Won
1998	British Academy Television Awards	Best Actor	Hamish Macbeth	Nominated
1998	MTV Movie & TV Awards	Best Dance Sequence (with Mark Addy, Paul Barber, Steve Huison, Hugo Speer & Tom Wilkinson)	The Full Monty	Nominated
1998	Sant Jordi Awards	Best Foreign Actor	The Full Monty & Go Now	Won
1998	Golden Satellite Awards	Best Actor in a Motion Picture, Comedy or Musical	The Full Monty	Nominated
1999	British Academy Television Awards	Best Actor	Looking After Jo Jo	Nominated
2000	Fangoria Chainsaw Awards	Best Actor	Ravenous	Nominated
2000	Irish Film & Television Awards	Best Actor	Angela's Ashes	Nominated
2001	Empire Awards	Best British Actor	Angela's Ashes	Nominated
2004	Golden Satellite Awards	Best Actor in a Miniseries or a Motion Picture Made for Television	Hitler: The Rise of Evil	Nominated
2006	Primetime Emmy Awards	Outstanding Supporting Actor in a Limited or Anthology Series or Movie	Human Trafficking	Nominated
2006	Gold Derby Awards	TV movie/Miniseries Supporting Actor	Human Trafficking	Nominated
2006	Women's Image Network Awards	Outstanding Lead Actor in a Miniseries or a Movie	Human Trafficking	Won
2008	BAFTA Scotland Awards	Best Acting Performance in Film	Summer	Nominated
2009	BAFTA Scotland Awards	Best Actor – Television	The Unloved	Won
2010	Gemini Awards	Best Actor in a Continuing Leading Dramatic Role	Stargate Universe	Won
2015	BAFTA Scotland Awards	Best Directing in Film or Television	The Legend of Barney Thomson	Nominated
2015	BAFTA Scotland Awards	Best Actor – Film	The Legend of Barney Thomson	Nominated
2015	BAFTA Scotland Awards	Best Feature Film (with John G. Lenic, Kaleena Kiff & Brian Coffey)	The Legend of Barney Thomson	Won
2015	Behind the Voice Actors Awards	Best Male Lead Vocal Performance in a Video Game	Castlevania: Lords of Shadow 2	Nominated
2015	Edinburgh International Film Festival Awards	The Michael Powell Award for Best British Feature Film	The Legend of Barney Thomson	Nominated
2016	Monte-Carlo Comedy Film Festival	Audience Award	The Legend of Barney Thomson	Won
2017	20/20 Awards	Best Supporting Actor	Trainspotting	Nominated
2017	BAFTA Scotland Awards	Best Actor – Film	T2 Trainspotting	Nominated
