= Castlevania: Lords of Shadow – Mirror of Fate =

2013 video game

- Developer: MercurySteam
- Publisher: Konami
- Director: Jose Luis Márquez
- Producer: Dave Cox
- Writers: Jose Luis Márquez; Dave Cox
- Composer: Óscar Araujo
- Series: Castlevania
- Engine: Mercury Engine
- Platforms: Nintendo 3DS, Xbox 360, PlayStation 3, Windows
- Release: Nintendo 3DS: NA: March 5, 2013; EU: March 8, 2013; JP: March 20, 2013; Xbox 360: WW: October 25, 2013; PlayStation 3: NA: October 29, 2013; EU: October 30, 2013; JP: December 4, 2013; Windows: WW: March 27, 2014
- Genres: Action-adventure, hack and slash
- Mode: Single-player

Castlevania: Lords of Shadow – Mirror of Fate (Note: known in Japan as Castlevania: Lords of Shadow Sadame no Makyō (キャッスルヴァニア ロード オブ シャドウ 宿命の魔鏡, Rōdo obu Shadō Sadame no Makyō; lit. Castlevania: Lords of Shadow - Magic Mirror of Destiny)) is a 2013 action-adventure game developed by MercurySteam and published by Konami for the Nintendo 3DS. It is a direct sequel to Castlevania: Lords of Shadow, which served as a reboot of the Castlevania franchise. Players control multiple characters as they explore a labyrinthine castle and piece together the mystery of Dracula's return.

The game received mixed-to-positive reviews, with praise for its visuals and combat, while some criticized its story and level design. An upgraded version of the game, titled Castlevania: Lords of Shadow – Mirror of Fate HD, was released digitally for Xbox 360, PlayStation 3, and Windows.

== Gameplay ==
The player assumes the role of Gabriel Belmont, his son Trevor Belmont, grandson Simon Belmont (Trevor's son), and Alucard. Mirror of Fate is a side-scrolling action-adventure game. It returns to the classic Castlevania gameplay viewed in the main series.

== Plot ==
One year prior to becoming Dracula, (Note: As depicted in Castlevania: Lords of Shadow (2010)) Gabriel Belmont (voiced by Robert Carlyle) spend a night with his wife Marie before accompanying four Order knights on a mission to slay a Lycan. While he is gone, Marie gives birth while surrounded by Pan and the heads of the Order. She names the baby Trevor before the Order takes him away due to fear of an omimous prophecy, and he is raised in their custody.

Twenty-seven years later, Trevor (voiced by Richard Madden) learns that he is Dracula's son, and plans to journey to Dracula's castle and avenge the death of his mother Marie. He bids his wife Sypha and young son Simon farewell, giving Simon a medallion he received from The Order. Upon reaching the castle, he meets a Shade (voiced by Michael Maloney) who tells him that he will die before he kills Dracula; in a rage, Trevor breaks the Shade's face, rendering it mute. As he ventures through the castle, Trevor obtains the medallions of fallen Order knights and learns light and dark magic. He is repeatedly attacked by Dracula's forces, including a chimera known as the Daemon Lord (voiced by Richard Ridings), pursuing and slaying each of them.

Confronting Dracula in the throne room, Trevor swears to kill him and avenge his mother. Dracula declares that he does not care about his victims, and the two fight. The fight moves high above the castle, and Trevor cuts off Dracula's hands before the two plummet to the ground. Trevor attempts to plunge his Combat Cross into Dracula as they fall, but ends up impaled himself. Though Dracula gloats, Trevor reveals that he is his son, which Dracula confirms in his Mirror of Fate. Driven mad with grief, Dracula attempts to turn Trevor into a vampire to save him, but he is already dead. Dracula builds Trevor a coffin, engraving it with the name "Alucard" to protect Trevor's identity. Elsewhere, Simon witnesses Sypha's murder at the hands of Dracula's forces, and he swears vengeance before fleeing to the mountains. The mountain people spend thirty years raising him as a fighter, and he becomes a master at the whip.

Upon reaching adulthood, Simon (voiced by Alec Newman) leaves the mountains to go to Dracula's castle. Upon arriving, the Shade requests his medallion, but he refuses. The Shade directs him to obtain a copy of Gabriel's original Combat Cross. In the castle, Alucard awakens from his tomb, and the Shade shows him that he is now a vampire, turned by Dracula. Alucard, suffering from amnesia, believes that his fate is to slay Dracula. While exploring the castle, he is attacked by the Daemon Lord, now resurrected as a cyborg. The Daemon Lord easily defeats Alucard and burns him in the sunlight before dropping him off the tower, and Alucard barely survives. During his journey back up the tower, Alucard saves Simon twice from danger, but leaves before revealing his identity.

Simon finds the Combat Cross, but a necromancer tries to claim it for Dracula's former foe Zobek, whom he believes still alive. Simon slays the Necromancer and continues to ascend the tower, as does Alucard. Simon encounters and kills Dracula's lover, the Succubus (voiced by Elanor Howell), while Alucard slays the Daemon Lord. Both men reach the throne room and battle Dracula, who infects Simon with darkness and causes him to turn on Alucard. Alucard cures Simon, who deals the killing blow and causes Dracula to dissolve, though Alucard believes he is not fully dead.

Alucard tells Simon to give the Shade his medallion, revealed to be a shard of the Mirror of Fate, which has been manipulating the Belmonts. Simon once more asks Alucard's true identity, but Alucard leaves without a word. After finding the stake that broke off Gabriel's Combat Cross, Alucard flees the collapsing castle, and Simon bids him farewell.

== Development ==
Mirror of Fate was announced in May 2012, for the Nintendo 3DS as a side-scrolling action-adventure game. It was released on March 5, 2013, in North America and March 8, 2013, in Europe. Mirror of Fate was delayed because MercurySteam was not pleased with certain elements of it.

According to the producer David Cox, the development team had originally developed Mirror of Fate in HD, and adapted it later for the 3DS. The HD version of the game was released as a digital download on October 25, 2013, for Xbox 360 via Xbox Live Arcade, on October 29, 2013, for PlayStation 3 via PlayStation Network, and on March 27, 2014, for Windows through Steam.

== Reception ==
Reception

Aggregate score
Aggregator	Score
Metacritic	(3DS) 72/100 (X360) 73/100 (PS3) 70/100

Review scores
Publication	Score
1Up.com	C−
Game Informer	8.5/10
GameSpot	7/10
IGN	4.7/10
Joystiq	3.5/5

The game has received mixed reviews, with a 72/100 on aggregate score site Metacritic for the Nintendo 3DS. Peter Brown of GameSpot gave the game a 7 out of 10, praising the visuals and the combat system, while criticizing the game's easy difficulty and predictable story. IGN's Colin Moriarty panned the game with a score of 4.7 out of 10, concluding that it had "emphasis on fragmented exploration and shallow leveling".
