= Bail or Jail =

2019 video game

- Developer: Free Style
- Publisher: Konami
- Director: Katsunori Tanaka
- Producer: Katsunori Tanaka
- Designer: 1023
- Platforms: Nintendo Switch; Microsoft Windows
- Release: Nintendo Switch: JP: August 1, 2019; WW: August 29, 2019; Windows: WW: July 21, 2022
- Genre: Action
- Mode: Multiplayer

Bail or Jail (originally titled Obakeidoro!) is an asymmetrical multiplayer action game developed by Free Style and published by Konami Digital Entertainment. The game was originally released on the Nintendo Switch in 2019, and ported to Windows PC on July 21, 2022 under its new name.

A sequel titled Obakeidoro 2: Chase & Seek was released in 2025.

== Gameplay ==
Bail or Jail is an asymmetrical multiplayer action game. It is a tag game, in which up to four players are divided into three humans and a monster. The Monster must capture all humans within a 3-minute time limit to win. The humans must keep at least 1 human out of jail. The Human skills are run and hide, but also use the lantern to stun the Monster for a while as well as press the all switches to unlock the jail to rescue the captured fellow. Meantime, the Monster use its own skills such as slipping through walls or detecting footprints to capture all Humans.

There are also various lanterns and they can be used only once but restored by rescuing the fellow from the jail. On the other hand, the disadvantage is the lantern's light makes easy to find Human's location for Monster.

Bail or Jail offers 5 modes, which are Quick Match, Friend Match and Join Match with online as well as single player and local multiplayer with offline. Quick Match allows players to play with random opponents from around the world. Friend Match can be played with Steam friends, but this mode can only allow either the friends or CPU to participate. If you want to play with friends who is not yours, then need to use Join Friend. Join Friend allows to hop into friends who are currently playing Quick Match or Friend Match. Single player is a mode that you can choose a stage and play as many times as you like. Local Multiplayer is up to 4 players can play together on a single screen without the internet.

== Release ==
The Steam version of Bail or Jail has increased resolution, frame rates of up to 144 FPS and additional sound effects. In addition, players can use Discord to invite other players from the same server.

The game was released for Nintendo Switch in July 2022. It was globally released for Microsoft Windows by Konami Digital Entertainment on July 21, 2022. In October 2022, the company released two free downloadable content packs which introduce Alucard and Leon Belmont from the Castlevania franchise to the game.

== Sequel ==
A sequel titled Obakeidoro 2: Chase & Seek was announced to be released for the Nintendo Switch 2, scheduled for Summer 2025. It released on October 9, 2025 in Japan, and will release worldwide for both the Nintendo Switch and Nintendo Switch 2 on August 6, 2026.

== Reception ==
Reception

Review score
Publication	Score
TouchArcade	2.5/5

Shaun Musgrave of TouchArcade rated the game 2.5/5 points, saying there was a good idea behind it but criticizing its execution. Calling it "not very enjoyable to play", he compared it to Friday the 13th: The Video Game, saying it was worse. However, Nintendo Force Magazine rated the game 8.5/10 points, calling it "family-frightening fun". Ken Allsop of PCGamesN called the game "a very cutesy take on the Dead by Daylight formula" and recommended it to people who were intimidated by the former game's "grisly nature".
