= Hiroko Takahashi =

Hiroko Takahashi may refer to:

- Hiroko Takahashi (cross-country skier) (高橋 弘子, born 1942), Japanese cross-country skier
- Hiroko Takahashi (高橋 裕子, born 1979), better known as Ao Takahashi, Japanese voice actress
- Hiroko Takahashi (高橋 浩子, 1969–2013), better known as Kaoru Shimamura, Japanese voice actress
- Hiroko Takahashi (artist), Japanese textile artist

== See also ==
- Hiroki Takahashi, actor and singer
- Hiroto Takahashi, baseball player
