= Castlevania III: Dracula's Curse =

1989 video game

- North American box art depicting three of the game's playable characters: Trevor Belmont (bottom), Sypha Belnades (center) and Grant Danasty (top)
- Developer: Konami
- Publishers: JP/NA: Konami; EU: Palcom
- Director: Hitoshi Akamatsu
- Designer: I. Urata
- Programmers: Yasuo Okuda; Mitsuo Takemoto
- Artists: Noriyasu Togakushi; Takeshi Fujimoto; I. Urata
- Composers: Hidenori Maezawa; Jun Funahashi; Yukie Morimoto; Yoshinori Sasaki
- Series: Castlevania
- Platform: Nintendo Entertainment System
- Release: JP: December 22, 1989; NA: September 19, 1990; EU: May 1992
- Genre: Platform
- Mode: Single-player

Castlevania III: Dracula's Curse (Note: Known in Japan as Akumajō Densetsu (悪魔城伝説, Demon Castle Legend)) is a 1989 platform game developed and published by Konami for the Nintendo Entertainment System. It was released on December 22, 1989, in Japan, September 19, 1990, in North America and in May 1992 in PAL regions by Konami's Palcom publishing label.

Despite being the third numbered installment in the Castlevania series, Castlevania III: Dracula's Curse is a prequel to the original Castlevania (1986), being set a few centuries before its events. The game's protagonist is Trevor Belmont, an ancestor of Simon Belmont, who is called into action to vanquish the forces of Dracula. Relinquishing the role-playing and action-adventure elements from Castlevania II: Simon's Quest, the game returns to the action-platforming gameplay of the original Castlevania but also introduces new concepts to the formula such as branching level paths and multiple playable characters.

Castlevania III received positive reviews, with journalists calling the game a great return to roots for the Castlevania series and praising its soundtrack, graphics, and additional playable characters, though some criticized its high difficulty. The game has been re-released on the Virtual Console for the Wii, Nintendo 3DS and Wii U, and was subsequently included in the Castlevania Anniversary Collection for Nintendo Switch, PlayStation 4, Windows and Xbox One. The game was later adapted into the first two seasons of the animated 2017 Castlevania television series. The storyline of Dracula's Curse is continued in the games Castlevania: Curse of Darkness (2005) and Castlevania: Belmont's Curse (2026).

== Gameplay ==
At certain points in the game, the player must choose between two stages to play through. These paths can lead to different endings and new playable characters.

Castlevania III abandons the action-adventure and role-playing elements of its immediate predecessor Castlevania II: Simon's Quest and returns to the platform game roots of the original Castlevania. Unlike the first Castlevania, however, Castlevania III is non-linear: Trevor, the main character, can be assisted by one of three possible companions, and after completing the first level, and at several other points throughout the game, the player is given a choice of two branching paths to follow. The player can obtain multiple endings depending on the choices they make throughout the game.

There are two main routes through the game's sixteen stages, which are referred to as blocks and are broken down into several sections. The second stage is an optional excursion for picking up one of the three partner characters, and the main branch occurs part way through the third stage. Each route contains a total of nine stages (ten if the player takes the optional second stage). The upper route takes the player across the lake to the main bridge, entering Dracula's castle through the front gate, while the lower route takes the player through a series of tunnels and caverns, leading to a climb up the cliff face below the castle. The lower route also features one short branching section of its own at stage 6. The two paths converge in the main hall of the castle.

== Plot ==
The game is set in 1476, when Count Dracula begins ravaging Europe with an army of monsters. The Belmont family of vampire hunters, once exiled from Wallachia, are called into action. Joining Trevor Belmont in his mission to defeat Dracula are three new playable characters: Sypha Belnades, a young sorceress with poor physical attack power but powerful elemental magic spells at her disposal; Grant Danasty, a pirate with the ability to climb on walls and change direction in mid-jump; and Alucard, Dracula's son, a dhampir with the ability to shoot fireballs and transform into a bat. Trevor can be accompanied by only one companion at a time. If he chooses to take on another, he must abandon his current companion. The ending of the game differs depending on which companion Trevor has with him at the time, or whether he takes no companion at all.

== Development and release ==
Besides the different title, Akumajō Densetsu, the Japanese version has several other differences. It contains a specialized VRC6 coprocessor chip. The game's audio programmer, Hidenori Maezawa, assisted in the chip's creation. This chip added two extra pulse wave channels and a saw wave channel to the system's initial set of five sound channels. The majority of the music combines the channels to imitate the sound of a synthesized string section. Western versions of the NES did not have the ability to support external sound chips, so the North American release replaced the VRC6 with Nintendo's Memory Management Controller 5 (MMC5). The game's music had to be changed by Yoshinori Sasaki to comply with the NES's standard five channels. Akumajō Dracula Famicom Best was a soundtrack album that included the Famicom version of the game's original music.

In the Japanese version, instead of using a stabbing dagger, Grant throws daggers as his main attack. Some enemies do less damage in the Japanese version, and had their sprites changed for the Western releases. Some instances of nudity on the enemies were censored, and religious iconography was pared down. The Japanese version has slightly different backgrounds in many stages, and has special effects not seen in the North American and European releases.

The North American and PAL versions have several hidden features that can be accessed by entering a certain name for the player, which include starting the game with 10 lives (by entering the name "HELP ME"), the option to start the game with any of the three spirit partners, and to access the second, more difficult quest. These features are not present in the Japanese version.

It was released in Japan on December 22, 1989, in North America on September 19, 1990, and in Europe in May 1992. The game also received a Windows release on November 16, 2002. The North American packaging artwork was painted by Tom Dubois, who stated that he was inspired by animator Ray Harryhausen's works.

It was released on the Wii Virtual Console in the PAL regions on October 31, 2008, in North America on January 12, 2009 and in Japan on April 21, 2009. It was released on the Nintendo 3DS Virtual Console in the PAL regions on April 17, 2014 and in North America on June 24, 2014. It was released on the Wii U Virtual Console in Japan on April 16, 2014, in North America on June 26, 2014 and in the PAL regions on September 4, 2014.

It was later released again as part of the Castlevania Anniversary Collection for Nintendo Switch, PlayStation 4, Windows, and Xbox One on May 16, 2019. The Famicom version was made available to western audiences for the first time as a bonus update to this collection a month later.

== Reception ==
Reception

Review scores
Publication	Score
AllGame	4.5/5
Famitsu	7/10, 8/10, 8/10, 7/10
Total!	80%

In the Japanese game magazine Famitsu praising it for a return to the first game's format, the new allies, and the upgraded sound, with two reviewers finding its main drawback was its excessive difficulty. In 1997 Electronic Gaming Monthly ranked it the 57th best console video game of all time, citing the multiple playable characters and routes to choose from and the outstanding graphics and music. Nintendo Power listed it as the ninth best Nintendo Entertainment System video game, praising it for its strong improvements over previous entries in the series. Game Informer's Tim Turi felt that it was a return to form after Castlevania II. He discussed characters such as Alucard (whom he called iconic) and Grant (whom he praised for his wall cling ability). GamesRadar ranked it the eighth best NES game ever made. The staff felt that it returned to Castlevania's roots after Castlevania II yet "took the series to new heights." GameZone ranked it as the third best Castlevania title. The staff preferred III the most as it felt like the original game the most; they felt its price on the Virtual Console was worthwhile.

In a retrospective review, Allgame editor Christopher Michael Baker highly praised the game, describing it as "the greatest Castlevania game to ever grace the NES" and "possibly even the greatest Castlevania game to ever hit any system".

IGN placed Castlevania III: Dracula's Curse 5th on their list of the Top 100 NES Games.

Former Castlevania producer and developer Koji Igarashi cites Castlevania III as his favorite game in the series, noting the sound and setting as the reasons. Shutaro Iida, who was a programmer for the GBA and NDS games and director of Castlevania: Harmony of Despair, also said it is his favorite in the series, and cited the special sound chip in the Japanese version as the reason why.

== In other media ==
An animated Dracula's Curse movie had been in development since 2007 with writer Warren Ellis, Frederator Studios, and James Jean attached to the project. In August 2015, film producer Adi Shankar teased that the project, now an animated mini series, was finally in production. Titled simply Castlevania, the first season of the series premiered on Netflix on July 7, 2017. After the 4-episode first-season premiere, it was later renewed for an 8-episode second series which premiered on October 26, 2018. A ten-episode third season was released on March 5, 2020. The final season, consisting of 10 episodes, was released on May 13, 2021.
