= Bootleg Multiverse =

American animation franchise

- Created by: Adi Shankar
- Owners: Bootleg Universe; Netflix

Films and television
- Animated series: Castlevania (2017–2021); Castlevania: Nocturne (2023–2025); Captain Laserhawk: A Blood Dragon Remix (2023); Devil May Cry (2025–present)

The Bootleg Multiverse (Note: "Bootleg Multiverse" is a working title, as no official name has been announced yet.) is an American animation franchise created by Adi Shankar, which he named after his Bootleg Universe project of unauthorized productions based on popular culture satires. The series comprising this franchise are based on diverse video games from several companies around the world, featuring an anime-influenced style by various artists.

== Overview ==
Series	Season	Episodes	Originally released	Based on
Castlevania	1	4	July 7, 2017	Castlevania by Konami
Castlevania	2	8	October 26, 2018	Castlevania by Konami
Castlevania	3	10	March 5, 2020	Castlevania by Konami
Castlevania	4	10	May 13, 2021	Castlevania by Konami
Castlevania: Nocturne	1	8	September 28, 2023	Castlevania by Konami
Castlevania: Nocturne	2	8	January 16, 2025	Castlevania by Konami
Captain Laserhawk: A Blood Dragon Remix	1	6	October 19, 2023	Far Cry 3: Blood Dragon by Ubisoft
Devil May Cry	1	8	April 3, 2025	Devil May Cry by Capcom
Devil May Cry	2	8	May 12, 2026	Devil May Cry by Capcom
Devil May Cry	3	TBA	TBA	Devil May Cry by Capcom

== List of featured animated TV series ==
=== Castlevania (2017–2021) ===
When his wife is burned at the stake after being falsely accused of witchcraft, the vampire Count Dracula declares all the people of Wallachia will pay with their lives. He summons an army of demons which overruns the country, causing the people to live lives of fear and distrust. To combat this, the outcast monster hunter Trevor Belmont takes up arms against Dracula's forces, aided by the magician Sypha Belnades and Dracula's dhampir son Alucard.

The series is based on the video game series by Konami, and is written by Warren Ellis and produced by Frederator Studios, Powerhouse Animation Studios, Shankar Animation, Project 51 Productions and Mua Film. The first season of four 30-minute episodes was released on July 7, 2017. The second season is eight episodes long and was released on October 26, 2018. The ten-episode third season was released on March 5, 2020. The series ended with the release of its fourth season on May 13, 2021.

=== Castlevania: Nocturne (2023–2025) ===
On May 11, 2021, Netflix announced that a new series set in the Castlevania universe with a different cast of characters was being planned. The series focuses on Richter Belmont, a descendant of Trevor and Sypha, alongside Maria Renard during the French Revolution. The eight-episode first season was released on Netflix on September 28, 2023, and the eight-episode second and final season was released on January 15, 2025.

=== Captain Laserhawk: A Blood Dragon Remix (2023) ===
The series is set in 1992, in an alternate history in which the United States has become Eden, a dystopian technocracy controlled by the megacorporation of the same name and populated by humans and artificially created anthropomorphic animals called "Hybrids", who are treated by humans as slaves, livestock and beasts of burden. Dolph Laserhawk, a supersoldier modified by Eden Tech Military, escapes and becomes a fugitive alongside his boyfriend Alex Taylor. During a final heist, Taylor betrays Laserhawk, who is captured and incarcerated in Eden's black site prison, Supermaxx. Under the direction of Supermaxx's warden, who has implanted an explosive device inside him, Laserhawk is selected to lead a team of other captive rebels, known as the Ghosts, on a series of covert operations to undermine Taylor's plans.

The series was announced in June 2021. It is inspired by Far Cry 3: Blood Dragon while featuring remixed versions of several prominent Ubisoft properties. The series was released on October 19, 2023 on Netflix.

=== Devil May Cry (2025–present) ===
While being hunted by the government organization Dark Realm Command (DARKCOM) under Vice President William Baines, Dante, a cambion demon hunter for hire, comes into conflict with a demon-obsessed terrorist called the White Rabbit who seeks revenge on the human race.

Based on the video game series of the same name by Capcom. The second animated adaptation after Devil May Cry: The Animated Series (2007). The eight-episode first season was released on Netflix on April 3, 2025 and the eight-episode second season was released on May 12, 2026. The series has been renewed for a third and final season.

=== Planned series ===
- Assassin's Creed (Ubisoft)
- Hyper Light Drifter (Heart Machine)
- PlayerUnknown's Battlegrounds (Krafton)

== Other media ==
=== Books ===
- Castlevania — The Art of the Animated Series
- Castlevania: Nocturne — The Art of the Animated Series
- Captain Laserhawk: A Blood Dragon Remix — The Art of the Animated Series
- Devil May Cry — The Art of the Animated Series

=== Comics ===
- Captain Laserhawk: Mega City Blues (November 8, 2023): The comic book one-shot was supervised by Adi Shankar, written by Faouz.b, with art by Grelin, and published by Glénat Éditions.
- Captain Laserhawk: Crushing Love (March 12, 2024): The manga published by Tokyopop was supervised by Adi Shankar, written by GLAAD Media Award-nominated writer Ben Kahn, with art by Bayou Kun.

=== Music ===
- Devil May Cry The Season 1 Soundtrack (April 3, 2025): The album includes the original song "Afterlife" by Evanescence.

== See also ==
- Devil May Cry: The Animated Series
- The Guardians of Justice
