= Castlevania (TV series) =

American adult animated series

- Genre: Action; Adventure; Dark fantasy; Drama; Gothic; Horror
- Created by: Warren Ellis
- Based on: Castlevania III: Dracula's Curse; Castlevania: Curse of Darkness and Castlevania: Symphony of the Night by Konami
- Written by: Warren Ellis
- Directed by: Sam Deats; Adam Deats; Spencer Wan; Amanda Sitareh B.
- Voices of: Richard Armitage; James Callis; Graham McTavish; Alejandra Reynoso; Tony Amendola; Matt Frewer; Emily Swallow; Theo James; Adetokumboh M'Cormack; Jaime Murray; Peter Stormare; Jessica Brown Findlay; Rila Fukushima; Jason Isaacs; Yasmine Al Massri; Ivana Miličević; Navid Negahban; Bill Nighy; Toru Uchikado; Gildart Jackson; Lance Reddick; Barbara Steele; Malcolm McDowell; Toks Olagundoye; Marsha Thomason; Titus Welliver; Christine Adams; Matthew Waterson
- Composer: Trevor Morris
- Country of origin: United States
- Original language: English
- No. of seasons: 4
- No. of episodes: 32

Production
- Executive producers: Kevin Kolde; Warren Ellis; Fred Seibert; Ted Biaselli; Adi Shankar; Larry Tanz
- Producers: Jason Williams; Maki Terashima-Furuta
- Running time: 22–31 minutes
- Production companies: Frederator Studios; Powerhouse Animation; Adi Shankar Animation; Project 51 Productions; Warren Ellis Productions (seasons 3–4)

Original release
- Network: Netflix
- Release: July 7, 2017 – May 13, 2021

Related
- Castlevania: Nocturne

Castlevania is an American adult animated action horror television series created and written by Warren Ellis for Netflix. Based on the Japanese Castlevania series by Konami, the first two seasons adapt the 1989 entry Castlevania III: Dracula's Curse and follow Trevor Belmont, Alucard and Sypha Belnades as they defend the nation of Wallachia from Dracula and his minions. Additionally, characters and elements from the 2005 entry Castlevania: Curse of Darkness are featured beginning in the second season, and Alucard's backstory is drawn from the 1997 entry Castlevania: Symphony of the Night. The art style is heavily influenced by Japanese animation and Ayami Kojima's artwork. The series was produced by Frederator Studios, Powerhouse Animation, Adi Shankar Animation, Project 51 Productions, and Warren Ellis Productions, with animation services provided by MUA Film. (Note: Credited as Tiger Animation in season 4.)

The series premiered on Netflix on July 7, 2017, and was renewed for an expanded second season of eight episodes on the same day; the second season premiered on October 26, 2018. A ten-episode third season was greenlit by Netflix and released on March 5, 2020. The series ended with the release of its fourth season on May 13, 2021. The series received critical acclaim, with praise for its visuals, animation, voice acting, action sequences, characterization, themes, and writing, although the pacing, particularly in the third and fourth seasons, garnered a polarized response.

A sequel series, Castlevania: Nocturne, premiered on Netflix on September 28, 2023. The series focuses on Richter Belmont, a descendant of Trevor and Sypha, and Maria Renard during the French Revolution, with James Callis reprising his role as Alucard.

== Premise ==
When his human wife is burned at the stake after being falsely accused of witchcraft, the vampire Vlad Dracula Țepeș declares all the people of Wallachia will pay with their lives. He summons an army of vampires and demons that overrun the country, slaughtering the population and leaving the survivors to live lives of fear and distrust. To combat this, Trevor Belmont, the last living member of a once-legendary family of monster hunters, takes up arms against Dracula's forces, aided by the magician Sypha Belnades and Dracula's dhampir son Alucard.

== Characters ==
=== Introduced in season 1 ===
- Richard Armitage as Trevor Belmont, the last living member of the Belmont clan, an excommunicated family of monster hunters.
- James Callis as Adrian "Alucard" Țepeș, the dhampir son of Dracula and Lisa Țepeș, who seeks to protect humanity from his father.
- Graham McTavish as Vlad Dracula Țepeș (seasons 1–2, 4), a vampire who swears vengeance on humanity for the murder of his wife Lisa, summoning an army of monsters to kill all the people of Wallachia.
- Alejandra Reynoso as Sypha Belnades, a Speaker magician and the Elder's granddaughter who wields powerful elemental magic.
- Matt Frewer as The Bishop (seasons 1–2), a corrupt clergyman who orders the burning of Lisa Țepeș for witchcraft, later being named the bishop of Gresit.
- Emily Swallow as Lisa Țepeș (seasons 1–2, 4), Dracula's beloved human wife who is burned at the stake in Târgoviște after being falsely accused of witchcraft.
- Tony Amendola as The Elder (season 1), Sypha's grandfather and the leader of a group of Speakers aiding the people of Gresit whom Trevor befriends.

=== Introduced in season 2 ===
- Theo James as Hector (seasons 2–4), a Devil Forgemaster called upon to serve Dracula in his war against humanity.
- Adetokumboh M'Cormack as Isaac (seasons 2–4), another Devil Forgemaster and fierce loyalist of Dracula who helps to lead his army.
- Jaime Murray as Carmilla (seasons 2–4), a scheming vampire mistress and member of Dracula's war council who seeks to usurp him, leader of the Council of Sisters.
- Peter Stormare as Godbrand (season 2), a Viking vampire warlord called upon to serve Dracula in the battle against humanity.

=== Introduced in season 3 ===
- Jessica Brown Findlay as Lenore (seasons 3–4), the diplomat member of the Council of Sisters.
- Rila Fukushima as Sumi (season 3), a vampire hunter from Japan using a sword.
- Jason Isaacs as The Judge (season 3), the town leader of Lindenfeld who wishes to keep peace and order in town at all costs.
- Yasmine Al Massri as Morana (seasons 3–4), the strategist member of the Council of Sisters.
- Ivana Miličević as Striga (seasons 3–4), the military member of the Council of Sisters.
- Navid Negahban as Sala (season 3), the leader of the monks of Lindenfeld.
- Bill Nighy as Saint Germain (seasons 3–4), a strange man researching a realm known as the Infinite Corridor.
- Toru Uchikado as Taka (season 3), a vampire hunter from Japan using a bow.
- Gildart Jackson as Flyseyes (seasons 3–4), a demon created by Isaac who was once a philosopher from Athens.
- Lance Reddick as The Captain (season 3), a pirate captain who befriends and helps Isaac.
- Barbara Steele as Miranda (season 3), an old woman possessing magic powers who helps Isaac.

=== Introduced in season 4 ===
- Malcolm McDowell as Death (season 4), a manipulative, skeletal creature that feeds on the dying souls of humans. McDowell also voices his alter-ego Varney, an egotistical vampire from London and former agent from Dracula's Army who seeks to resurrect his master.
- Toks Olagundoye as Zamfir (season 4), the head guard of Targoviste's underground court, fighting against night creatures.
- Marsha Thomason as Greta of Danesti (season 4), a swordswoman of Carthaginian descent and the head woman of Danesti, fighting against night creatures.
- Titus Welliver as Ratko (season 4), a brutal Slavic vampire soldier assisting Varney.
- Christine Adams as The Alchemist (season 4), a powerful mage who resides in the Infinite Corridor and controls it.
- Matthew Waterson as Dragan (season 4), a vampire general assisting Varney who seeks to resurrect Dracula.

== Episodes ==
Season	Episodes	Originally released
1	4	July 7, 2017
2	8	October 26, 2018
3	10	March 5, 2020
4	10	May 13, 2021

=== Season 1 (2017) ===
No. overall	No. in season	Title	Directed by	Written by	Original release date
1	1	"Witchbottle"	Sam Deats	Warren Ellis	July 7, 2017
In Wallachia in 1455, a young woman named Lisa who wishes to be a doctor seeks out Vlad Dracula Tepes, a vampire with advanced scientific knowledge. Intrigued by her courage and ambition, Dracula agrees to teach her, while she in turn offers to help him reconnect with humanity. The two eventually fall in love and marry. Twenty years later (1475), in the town of Târgoviște, Lisa is burned at the stake after a bishop discovers scientific equipment in her home and accuses her of witchcraft. Devastated after learning of Lisa's death, Dracula declares to the people that they have one year to make their peace, after which every human in Wallachia will die by his hand. His son Adrian tells him to go after the man responsible instead of all of humanity, but Dracula refuses to listen and attacks him. One year later, the archbishop hosts a celebration in defiance of Dracula. As promised, Dracula kills the archbishop, destroys the church and orders his army of demonic Night Creatures to kill every person left in Wallachia. As the army spreads across the land, the people place the blame on the kingdom's noble families, including the Belmonts.
2	2	"Necropolis"	Sam Deats	Warren Ellis	July 7, 2017
Following an altercation at a pub, Trevor Belmont seeks food and respite in the city of Gresit, which has been besieged by Dracula's forces every night. As he passes through town, he learns that the townspeople blame a group of nomadic scholars known as the Speakers for Dracula's assault. He saves their Elder from a pair of corrupt priests, who brings him back to the Speakers' home. Trevor insists they leave the city for their own safety, but the Elder refuses, as his grandchild has gone missing after venturing into the catacombs below the city in search of the "sleeping soldier", a legendary hero who they believe can defeat Dracula. Begrudgingly, Trevor agrees to retrieve the missing grandchild.
3	3	"Labyrinth"	Sam Deats	Warren Ellis	July 7, 2017
Exploring the catacombs, Trevor realizes that they have been unusually constructed and contain devices matching old family descriptions of devices within Dracula's castle. Finding a stone statue in the visage of a Speaker, Trevor is attacked by a giant cyclops. He defeats the creature, releasing its curse, and rescues the Elder's grandchild, Sypha Belnades. After returning Sypha to her grandfather, Trevor is summoned to the church by the local bishop, the same bishop who ordered Lisa's execution. He orders Trevor to leave Gresit before sundown, as the priests plan to lead a mob to kill the Speakers, offering to spare Trevor and restore his family name in exchange. With the Speakers refusing to retreat, Trevor has them hidden in the cyclops' chamber and takes on the priests leading the mob before escaping into the city.
4	4	"Monument"	Sam Deats	Warren Ellis	July 7, 2017
Night falls as Dracula's army descends upon Gresit. Night Creatures invade the church as it has become so full of corruption that God's presence is no longer felt there. The creatures taunt the bishop by calling out his hypocrisy and false authority before killing him. While Trevor continues his escape, Sypha appears to aid him, revealing herself as a powerful magic user. Trevor exposes the clergy's actions as the true reason for Dracula's invasion and assists the people in mounting a defense against the demons. During the battle, the floor crumbles beneath Trevor and Sypha and they fall deep into the submerged catacombs of the city. Making their way in deeper, they find the "sleeping soldier", revealed to be Adrian, who has spent a year healing from his last fight with Dracula. Adrian, now going by Alucard, engages Trevor in battle, but after seeing his and Sypha's resolve, he relents. Alucard reveals that the myth of the "sleeping soldier" was actually from the future and foretold his meeting with Belmont and Sypha, and that he was testing their abilities. The three prepare to challenge Dracula and end the conflict for good.

=== Season 2 (2018) ===
No. overall	No. in season	Title	Directed by	Written by	Original release date
5	1	"War Council"	Sam Deats	Warren Ellis	October 26, 2018
A flashback depicts Lisa's home in Lupu being raided by the Bishop and his men while Dracula is away, resulting in her arrest to be tried before an inquisition. In the present, Dracula assembles his war council, made up of vampire overlords from across the world, and places human necromancers Hector and Isaac in charge of the war on humanity. The Norse vampire Godbrand objects, believing they should rely on vampires instead of humans for leadership, but Dracula believes Hector and Isaac's hatred of their own kind (Hector being an unwanted child and Isaac being an abused former slave) makes them more trustworthy. As Gresit rebuilds after the battle, Sypha and Trevor see off the other Speakers while Alucard comes to terms with the decision to kill his father. At the castle, Godbrand laments to Hector that their war is fought with no strategy other than wanton destruction. Hector implies that Dracula wants all humans dead no matter the methods used, to Godbrand's disappointment. Dracula teleports the castle to a different location.
6	2	"Old Homes"	Sam Deats & Spencer Wan	Warren Ellis	October 26, 2018
Trevor and Sypha reunite with Alucard and ask how to locate Dracula's castle when it can move from place to place. Trevor recommends revisiting his old family estate, as the hold beneath the ruins contains information on the castle and tools for monster-hunting. The vampire mistress Carmilla arrives at the castle and causes further discord among the council by criticizing Dracula's approach and inquiring why he did not turn Lisa into a vampire. While traveling to the Belmont estate, Trevor's party is attacked by Dracula's forces; the group slays all the attackers, save one injured demon who escapes. At the castle, Isaac reminisces on his past, having killed his previous abusive master in a moment that shaped his ideals. Godbrand brings Isaac the injured demon, now dead, to extract information from it with his necromancy. At another assembly, the generals argue whether to continue their attack on Argeș or move the siege towards Brăila at Carmilla's suggestion. Isaac informs everyone of his findings, believing Alucard is working with a Belmont. Carmilla urges Dracula to keep watch on the Belmont estate, believing it may contain something that could destroy them.
7	3	"Shadow Battles"	Sam Deats & Adam Deats	Warren Ellis	October 26, 2018
Carmilla tries to convince Hector to create creatures to send to the Belmont house while encouraging Dracula to select Brăila as their next target. Hector reminisces on how Dracula found him in the east of Rhodes and recruited him to raise an army, though Hector asked for a cull of humans rather than a cruel genocide. Trevor, Sypha and Alucard reach the ruins of the Belmont estate and open a sealed door leading to a massive underground library. Sypha begins researching and Trevor locates several monster-hunting weapons, including the Morning Star whip, while Alucard is left uneasy by the various vampire remains preserved there. Godbrand expresses dissatisfaction with Dracula's plan, believing vampires will be left hungry without human blood to consume, but Dracula rebukes him. Carmilla tells Godbrand that Dracula must take the castle to Brăila, revealing how she killed the vampire who sired her after he became old and mad, deeming Dracula has become the same.
8	4	"Broken Mast"	Sam Deats	Warren Ellis	October 26, 2018
Godbrand comes to agree with Carmilla that Dracula is not fit to lead and that something must be done to change his plans. At the Belmont library, Trevor discovers a magical mirror which allows them to see things far away, and he bonds with Sypha. Carmilla continues to try to recruit Hector, intending to unseat Dracula if the castle is moved to Brăila. In a flashback, Isaac recalls how Dracula saved his life and recruited him to create his army. Godbrand and the other vampire generals grow tired of living without human blood and set out on demonic horses to a nearby village, slaughtering the people. Dracula speaks to Isaac about the war hall's turning against him and confesses he lied to Hector about his intent to spare a few humans. Godbrand privately approaches Isaac and suggests that they should pursue the war without Dracula. Isaac kills Godbrand for his treasonous intentions.
9	5	"Last Spell"	Sam Deats	Warren Ellis	October 26, 2018
Isaac releases Godbrand's ashes from the castle rooftop while Carmilla commands her troops to assemble at Brăila. Hector convinces Isaac to agree to the attack on Brăila. Hector shares this with Carmilla and informs her that his night creatures have nearly reached the Belmont estate. Isaac discusses Hector's request with Dracula, but asserts that there is no betrayal to be concerned about. Dracula reminisces about a time when he savored killing humans, but admits he is tired and cares only for results instead of the details. Carmilla and Hector approach Dracula and he approves the attack on Brăila. Afterwards, Carmilla turns on Hector, explaining he is now implicated in her impending betrayal of Dracula and cannot turn back on her plan now. At the Belmont library, Sypha discovers an unfinished locking spell that could be used to trap the castle in one place. The library starts to shake as Hector's night creatures arrive and attempt to break in.
10	6	"The River"	Sam Deats & Spencer Wan	Warren Ellis	October 26, 2018
Trevor fights off the demons as Alucard uses the distance mirror to locate Dracula's castle so Sypha can attempt to complete the locking spell. Dracula moves the castle to Brăila, and most of the vampire generals lead troops across the bridge to attack the town. At Carmilla's behest, Hector reanimates the Bishop and makes him bless the river. Carmilla's troops reveal themselves and bring down the bridge, dropping many of Dracula's soldiers to be destroyed by the now-holy water. Dracula's remaining forces retreat to the castle whilst Carmilla's soldiers cross the river on makeshift bridges. The two armies begin to battle in the castle's main hall, while Carmilla and Hector move elsewhere. Sypha finishes the spell just as Trevor defeats the last of the demons, her struggle against the castle's mechanisms causing the castle to teleport within Brăila, landing in the river and killing most of the two vampire factions. Sypha succeeds, disabling the castle's mechanisms while relocating it above the Belmont library.
11	7	"For Love"	Sam Deats	Warren Ellis	October 26, 2018
Emerging from the library, Trevor, Sypha and Alucard storm the castle and defeat the remaining vampires in the main hall. Dracula retreats to his study with Isaac, whom he sends through his magic mirror back to the desert to save him from the conflict. Alucard reaches the study and attacks Dracula, backed by Trevor and Sypha. The group is ultimately overpowered by Dracula, who engages in hand-to-hand combat with Alucard, moving through the castle as they battle until they eventually arrive to Alucard's childhood room. Realizing the gravity of his actions and that he was trying to kill his own son, Dracula breaks down in remorse before allowing Alucard to stake him through the heart, killing him. Trevor then arrives to decapitate Dracula while Sypha comes to burn the remains, leaving only his wedding ring intact. Alucard is upset about having killed his father, but Trevor and Sypha reassure him it was the right thing to do. They all exit the castle as morning dawns.
12	8	"End Times"	Sam Deats & Adam Deats	Warren Ellis	October 26, 2018
Alucard intends to make Dracula's now-deserted castle his grave, but Trevor gifts him the Belmont library along with encouragement to protect both their ancestral homes while using their collective knowledge to help people. Meanwhile, Isaac murders a group of raiders and turns them into night creatures, plotting to create an army for himself. In Brăila, Carmilla decides to return to Styria, enslaving Hector for his skills to quickly rebuild her forces and take advantage of the power vacuum left by Dracula's demise. Sypha convinces Trevor to stay with her and join her on new adventures battling monsters, and they part ways with Alucard. Left alone in the castle, Alucard reflects on the loss of his parents, is overcome by grief and breaks down crying.

=== Season 3 (2020) ===
No. overall	No. in season	Title	Directed by	Written by	Original release date
13	1	"Bless Your Dead Little Hearts"	Sam Deats	Warren Ellis	March 5, 2020
A month after Dracula's death, Alucard tries to adjust to his loneliness, but he misses Trevor and Sypha and fears he is going insane. Meanwhile, after dispatching rogue night creatures, Trevor and Sypha arrive in the small town of Lindenfeld, where a local priory sympathizes with Dracula's cause and wish to punish those responsible for his death. Carmilla returns to her castle in Styria with Hector to reunite with her Council of Sisters, which consists of herself, Lenore, Striga and Morana. Hector is then imprisoned in her castle.
14	2	"The Reparation of My Heart"	Sam Deats	Warren Ellis	March 5, 2020
In Tunis, Isaac, seeking revenge on Hector for his betrayal, is gifted a distance mirror from an elderly collector, which he then uses to locate Hector at Carmilla's castle. After slaughtering the people of Tunis when he is refused peaceful passage, Isaac and his creatures depart for Genoa on a boat belonging to a man known as the Captain. In Styria, Carmilla shares her plans to make Hector create an army of night creatures and use them dominate the area between their castle and Brăila, turning all the humans in the region into livestock. However, when Morgana and Striga point out how Hector will refuse or use the night creatures to betray them, Lenore volunteers to convince him otherwise. In Lindenfeld, Trevor meets the mysterious Saint Germain, who recognizes him as a Belmont. Germain persuades the priory leader, Sala, to grant him access into their library. At the Belmont hold, Alucard is visited by a pair of vampire hunters from Japan, Sumi and Taka, who wish to be trained by him in order to defend their people, which he accepts.
15	3	"Investigators"	Sam Deats	Warren Ellis	March 5, 2020
Befriending the Judge of Lindenfeld, Trevor and Sypha learn how one of Dracula's night creatures, nicknamed the Visitor, crashed into the priory and began communicating with the monks. Since then, Sala began refusing town folk into the priory's monastery and allowed disturbed strangers in; Trevor and Sypha agree to investigate what the priory is up to. On the open seas, the Captain and Isaac debate the merits of humanity. When Isaac says he wishes to continue Dracula's ambitions and eradicate humanity, the Captain challenges him to instead use his skills to teach humanity how to be kinder. At Carmilla's castle, Lenore brings food to an unclothed and battered Hector. Wary of her intentions, he threatens Lenore in an attempt to escape, only to be beaten down by her.
16	4	"I Have a Scheme"	Sam Deats	Warren Ellis	March 5, 2020
At Dracula's castle, Taka and Sumi reveal that they were once enslaved by one of Dracula's council members, Chō, until slaughtering her guards and escaping when she left to assist Dracula. Although Chō later died in the battle against Dracula, Taka and Sumi know another vampire will one day succeed her, and ask Alucard to teach them to be better vampire hunters. In Styria, Striga and Morgana debate over the costs of Carmilla's plan, concluding that, if successful, they will rule an empire. Meanwhile, Lenore provides Hector with foods and clothes, and questions his relationship with Dracula. At Lindenfeld, Germain gains entrance to the monastery, revealing to Sala that the symbol given to them by the Visitor is the alchemical sign for sulfur used by philosophers to denote hell. Isaac arrives in Genoa, where he is refused entry despite offering to pass through town quietly; this causes him to slaughter its people as in Tunis.
17	5	"A Seat of Civilisation and Refinement"	Sam Deats	Warren Ellis	March 5, 2020
While reflecting upon his life choices, Trevor meets the Judge and notices that the monks have carved alchemical signs throughout the town. Saint Germain continues to investigate inside the monastery and encounters the entrance to the basement, which Sala refuses to let him enter. Outside he meets Sypha, who knows he is a magician. Joined with Trevor at the local tavern, Saint Germain tells them that he is in search of a portal to the "Infinite Corridor", an alternate realm that grants access to infinite worlds across space and time. Saint Germain further explains that he once lost someone dear to him in the Corridor, and that a portal to it lies underneath the priory. Near Dracula's castle, Alucard begins training Sumi and Taka, bonding with them in the process.
18	6	"The Good Dream"	Sam Deats & Adam Deats	Warren Ellis	March 5, 2020
Lenore takes Hector for a walk around Carmilla's castle, further questioning Dracula's plans and how they would have benefited Hector, and he gradually starts to fall for her charms. In Lindenfeld, Trevor and Sypha decide to trust Germain. Germain has a nightmare of falling through the Infinite Corridor, witnessing numerous worlds and strange beings. The nightmare ends as Germain sees a woman in another portal, who throws him a crystal which he catches in his hand. At his campfire outside Genoa, Isaac converses with one of his night creatures, Flyseyes, about what his life was like before he was transported to hell and reborn. Flyseyes reveals that he was a philosopher in Athens during a time when philosophy was outlawed by Christians. When faced with death, he betrayed his fellow philosophers, only to be killed anyway and end up in hell for his treachery. Having learned to like sin, he thanks Isaac for his revival; this appears to deeply disturb the forgemaster.
19	7	"Worse Things Than Betrayal"	Sam Deats	Warren Ellis	March 5, 2020
Alucard takes Sumi and Taka to the Belmont hold, stating that they must start small. Returning to the monastery in Lindenfeld, Saint Germain discovers a book that shows how to bring back the dead from hell. Trevor fights with some of the monks, capturing one and bringing him back to meet the Judge and Sypha. Germain heads towards the monastery basement, where he finds the still-living Visitor impaled to the walls. Beyond Genoa and a two weeks' ride away from Styria, Isaac finds himself in an abandoned town and meets a blind woman named Miranda. Deducing Isaac to be a fellow forgemaster, Miranda informs him that a Magician captured townsfolk from several nearby towns, enslaving them in order to construct a great city. She also tells him that the Magician owns a transmission mirror that can transport Isaac and his army to Styria.
20	8	"What the Night Brings"	Sam Deats	Warren Ellis	March 5, 2020
While Striga, Morgana and eventually Carmilla strategize, Lenore meets with Hector again, offering him the chance to leave and be with her. Germain escapes from the basement and leaves the monastery, meeting with Trevor, Sypha and the Judge as they are interrogating the captured monk. The group devises a plan to fight the monks and help Germain open the Infinite Corridor; both the Judge's forces and the priory monks begin preparing for battle. In the Belmont hold, Alucard bonds with Taka and Sumi during their training, but they are both suspicious that Alucard is hiding something from them.
21	9	"The Harvest"	Sam Deats & Adam Deats	Warren Ellis	March 5, 2020
At sundown, the houses of Lindenfeld that bear the alchemical carvings combust into flames, killing the people. A battle between the monks and the Judge's men begins, as countless night creatures emerge from the Priory. Trevor, Sypha, and Saint Germain enter the monastery, where the Visitor harnesses the souls of the dead, using them to control the Infinite Corridor, thereby opening a portal to hell and revealing Dracula embracing Lisa. In Styria, Lenore has sex with Hector, tricking him into allowing a magical slave ring to slip onto his finger. Isaac and his night creatures enter the Magician's city and battle against his lifeless slaves and Legion, an amalgamation of countless human bodies. Isaac kills the Magician, releasing the corpses under his control. Taka and Sumi enter Alucard's room and proceed to have sex with him, then trap him with magical restraints.
22	10	"Abandon All Hope"	Sam Deats	Warren Ellis	March 5, 2020
Taka and Sumi accuse Alucard of withholding his knowledge of magic from them and not teaching them how to operate the castle. Before they can stake him, he uses his sword to slit their throats. In the monastery basement, Trevor and Sypha battle the night creatures while Germain tries closing the portal, forcing the Visitor to help him control it. Trevor destroys the Visitor, and Germain thanks him and Sypha before vanishing into the Infinite Corridor. After being stabbed by Sala, the Judge tells him of a secret path he can use to escape. The secret path is revealed to lead to a pit of spikes, which kills Sala. Investigating the pit and the Judge's house, Trevor and Sypha realize that the Judge had secretly been killing children by luring them to the pit. Emotionally distressed, they burn the Judge's house down and depart from Lindenfeld. At Carmilla's castle, Lenore presents the sisters with their own slave rings, which will force Hector, and by extension his night creatures, to be loyal to them. A grieving Alucard leaves Sumi and Taka's impaled bodies outside of Dracula's castle as a warning to future visitors, just as Dracula had before him.

=== Season 4 (2021) ===
No. overall	No. in season	Title	Directed by	Written by	Original release date
23	1	"Murder Wakes It Up"	Sam Deats	Warren Ellis	May 13, 2021
Six weeks after the Battle of Lindenfeld, Trevor and Sypha are exhausted from continually traveling the land, slaying night creatures and cultists who seek to resurrect Dracula. During these battles, they learn about an elemental spirit named Death who eats the souls of the dead. The two arrive at Târgoviște, where Dracula's campaign against humanity began. Exploring the ruins, Trevor finds a magical dagger. A pair of vampires named Varney and Ratko watch over the two, with Varney annoyed at their interference. Meanwhile Alucard, having since added numerous corpses outside of Dracula's castle, encounters a horse with a dead messenger carrying a map and summons to the village of Danesti, which requires his aid. After burying the corpse of the messenger, Alucard looks in a mirror and realizes that he is "turning into Belmont" in feeling a need to meddle in other's affairs.
24	2	"Having the World"	Sam Deats	Warren Ellis	May 13, 2021
Hector, no longer imprisoned and engaged in a proper relationship with Lenore, attempts to create a new forging hammer while secretly placing magic stones in the castle walls. While asking Carmilla to be patient with Hector, Lenore learns that she seeks dominion over the entire world, wishing to take everything from those that have taken from her. Hector finishes work on the hammer. While attempting to rest, Trevor and Sypha are ambushed by Varney and Ratko's night creatures but are saved by Zamfir, the head guard of Târgoviște's Underground Court. Zamfir wishes to recruit the pair to the local resistance, provided that she and the Underground Court earn their trust. As Zamfir pursues Varney and Ratko, Trevor pockets a glowing stone on the corpse of a resistance soldier in hopes it will prove useful.
25	3	"Walk Away"	Sam Deats	Warren Ellis	May 13, 2021
The night creatures bury corpses and rebuild the Magician's city under Isaac's direction. Flyseyes questions Isaac about his orders; Isaac explains that he wants them to do more than they were intended for, deciding to live his own life from now on. Varney contacts Isaac through a magic mirror and requests his help in resurrecting Dracula, but is rejected. At their campsite, Morana and Striga are ambushed by commonfolk seeking to drive them off. After she and her soldiers kill their attackers, Striga laments that she and Morana will be fighting and planning Carmilla's war forever, leaving them unsure. Carmilla contacts her sisters and urges them to come home. Back in Târgoviște, Trevor and Sypha witness how the remaining people are malnourished and they opt to investigate the city, hoping to earn Zamfir's trust by aiding others in her place. Trevor also discovers that the magic dagger can be energized by the glowing stone.
26	4	"You Must Sacrifice"	Sam Deats	Warren Ellis	May 13, 2021
While Trevor and Sypha discuss the situation in Târgoviște, Alucard arrives at Danesti and defends it from the attacking night creatures. Accepting the village leader Greta's request to act as its protector, Alucard also meets Saint Germain. In flashbacks, Germain is shown meeting his lover and with her researching the Infinite Corridor until she went missing. Within the Infinite Corridor, Germain meets an Alchemist who gives him a key to the Corridor so he can find his beloved—so long as he sacrifices everything he ever had, including his morals—also informing him that the only way to truly control the Corridor is to create a Rebis, an artificial body that is both man and woman, infused with two souls. Returning to earth, Germain embarks upon a dark path to collect necessary items and information until being recruited by Varney to aid in resurrecting Dracula, allying with him and the vampire warrior Dragan to orchestrate the attacks on Danesti and other villages. Back in the present, Germain proposes moving the people of Danesti into Dracula's castle for protection, to which Alucard agrees.
27	5	"Back in the World"	Sam Deats	Warren Ellis	May 13, 2021
Alucard, Greta, and Germain escort the villagers out of Danesti, but are ambushed by night creatures in the forest, although they are able to kill them and lead the people to the castle. While he is creating night creatures, Lenore informs Hector of Carmilla's scheme to dominate the world, confessing that Carmilla used her the same way Dracula used Hector. Back in Târgoviște, Sypha expresses outrage at Zamfir's taking food from the already-starved townsfolk to keep her own people nourished. Despite their differences, Sypha saves Zamfir from a night creature as they cannot afford to lose able fighters—however, the creature covertly plants a magical tracking stone onto the back of Zamfir's neck before being killed. Back in the Magician's city, Isaac and the night creatures move to attack Carmilla's castle, with Isaac ordering them to destroy everyone except for Hector, whom he plans to kill himself.
28	6	"You Don't Deserve My Blood"	Sam Deats	Warren Ellis	May 13, 2021
The Battle of Styria begins as Isaac and his army of night creatures clash with Carmilla's own. Lenore tries to drag Hector out of the castle, only to be trapped by Hector's magical barrier. Isaac meets Hector again and moves to kill Lenore, but decides to spare both after seeing Hector offer his life for Lenore's safety. Hector cuts off his own finger to remove the binding ring, while Isaac activates the barrier from the stones placed by Hector earlier, trapping Carmilla in her throne room. Isaac overwhelms Carmilla with his night creatures but, refusing to be killed by her enemies, Carmilla commits suicide before Isaac can finish her. Morana and Striga retreat with their forces after sensing Carmilla's death, while Hector and Isaac discuss how they were both used as tools for leverage. Isaac establishes his own kingdom in Styria, while Hector decides to stay with Lenore. Hector is also revealed to have been secretly working with Saint Germain and Varney to resurrect Dracula.
29	7	"The Great Work"	Sam Deats	Warren Ellis	May 13, 2021
The tracking stone planted on Zamfir allows Ratko and Varney to discover the Underground Court's location. As they plan their next move, Ratko mocks Varney as being a mere criminal and not a "perfect" vampire like himself, but Varney cryptically suggests that he's not who Ratko thinks he is. Trevor and Sypha finally meet with the Underground Court itself, only to discover it consists of the Royal Family's decaying corpses - and that Zamfir, having deluded herself into believing that the royals are merely sleeping, has been preparing for their "awakening" at the expense of her people's well-being. While Sypha and Zamfir argue, Trevor finds more magic artifacts and realizes they all go together. The Court is then invaded by a horde of night creatures led by Varney and Ratko. Meanwhile, as Alucard and Greta look after the refugees in Dracula's castle, Saint Germain secretly signals for Dragan's hidden army in the forest to march upon the castle, bringing with them a Rebis stitched together from the pieces of multiple corpses.
30	8	"Death Magic"	Sam Deats	Warren Ellis	May 13, 2021
Trevor, Sypha and Zamfir try to defend the survivors of Târgoviște. Zamfir sacrifices herself to save a mother and child from Ratko, who is subsequently killed by Trevor using a special cross-shaped blade he took from the Underground Court. Meanwhile, Alucard and Greta lead the refugees in a desperate fight against Dragan's forces, but are eventually forced back into Dracula's castle. Confronting Germain inside Alucard's childhood room, where Dracula had died, Alucard and Greta learn Germain is using the souls of those killed in the ongoing battle to open the Infinite Corridor - through which he will raise both Dracula and Lisa to fuse their souls into the Rebis, whose power will enable Germain to safely search the Corridor for his missing lover while also giving him unlimited access to the Corridor's infinite dimensions. Alucard tries to stop him, but Germain creates a magic barrier to protect himself. Back at Târgoviște, Varney finds a magic mirror that can teleport him to Dracula's castle and uses it to join Saint Germain. Seeing Varney flee into the mirror, Trevor and Sypha chase after him.
31	9	"The Endings"	Sam Deats	Warren Ellis	May 13, 2021
Trevor and Sypha arrive at Dracula's castle, reunite with Alucard and fight through the invaders. Dragan's forces bring the Rebis to Germain, while Varney gives him Hector's forging sequences to fuse Dracula and Lisa's souls into it. As Germain prepares the ritual, Varney reveals that he was the Alchemist who gave Germain the key before transforming into his true identity, the ancient elemental spirit Death. Forcing Germain to compete the ritual, Death admits that he manipulated Germain to unleash an insane Dracula upon the world again and feast on the endless death it causes. Trevor, Sypha and Alucard kill Dragan and his generals, reaching Germain just as he summons Dracula and Lisa into the Rebis. Trevor uses the Morning Star whip to break the magical barrier. Germain distracts Death long enough for Trevor to destroy the Rebis with holy water and the cross-shaped blade, freeing Dracula and Lisa's souls. However, the resulting explosion kills Germain. Enraged, Death consumes the key to strengthen himself. After telling Sypha that he loves her, Trevor fights against Death alone. He combines the artifacts recovered from the Court with the magic dagger and stabs Death with it, destroying him. The resulting explosion engulfs Trevor.
32	10	"It's Been a Strange Ride"	Sam Deats & Amanda Sitareh B.	Warren Ellis	May 13, 2021
Two weeks after Trevor's apparent death, Lenore, disillusioned with being a vampire and unwilling to live as Isaac's prisoner, makes her peace with Hector before walking out into the sunlight and dying. At Dracula's castle, the refugees are establishing a permanent settlement under Alucard and Greta's leadership, while Sypha reveals that she is pregnant with Trevor's child. A horse then appears carrying an injured Trevor, who had been transported to safety through the Infinite Corridor by Saint Germain just before the latter died. The weapon Trevor used was originally created by a wizard-turned-blacksmith as part of a "very one-sided" murder-suicide pact with God, hence why it had the power to slay Death. Meanwhile, it is revealed that Dracula and Lisa were successfully resurrected by the ritual and have settled into an inn disguised as commoners. They have no idea how they came back but decide to remain in hiding, allowing their son to live his own life while promising to visit him someday. The series ends with Dracula and Lisa together in bed, where they affirm their mutual love before promising to build their new future, with Dracula suggesting they travel to Whitby, England (a nod to the novel Dracula).

== Production ==
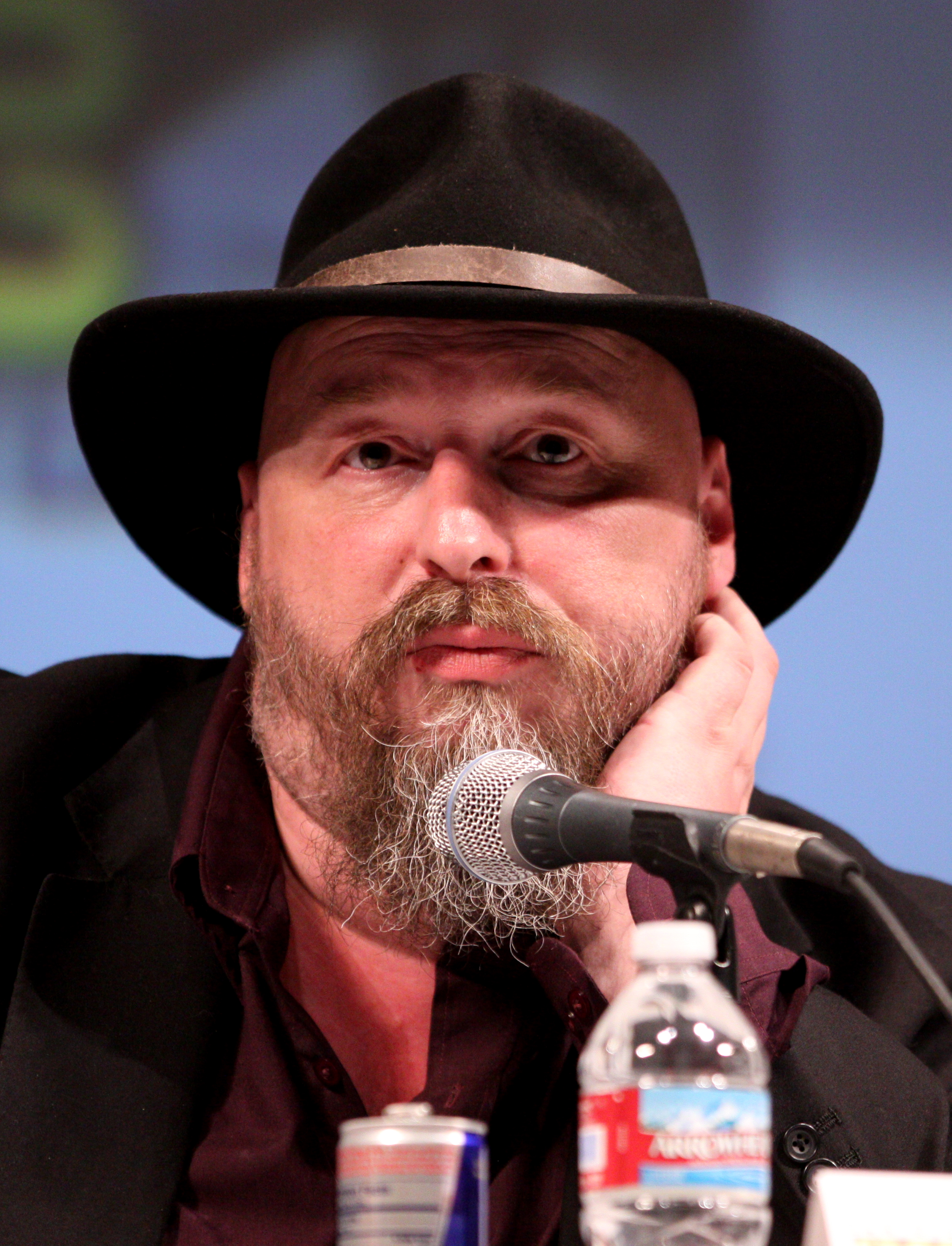
Warren Ellis wrote the series as a direct-to-video film before adapting it for a television format.

In March 2007, Frederator Studios acquired the rights to produce an animated film adaptation of Castlevania III: Dracula's Curse, intended as a direct-to-video production. In an interview with Paste, Warren Ellis said that when he was contacted about Castlevania he had no previous knowledge of the series and discovered it was a "Japanese transposition of the Hammer Horror films I grew up with and loved". Ellis explained how he worked with Castlevania producer Koji Igarashi to fit the film into the timeline of the series, including writing a new backstory, and how he was frustrated that Igarashi wanted eight full re-writes of pre-production material before giving approval. Ellis noted that Frederator's Kevin Kolde, who was slated to produce the work, did not want the film to be aimed at children, allowing Ellis to use gruesome imagery and scenes as necessary to tell the story he wanted to write, something that Ellis had found restrictive in working with normal television animation.

In adapting the game for the film, Ellis did not want to make a point-for-point adaptation, but instead provide some material to flesh out the game's world and elements behind it. At this stage, the film was anticipated to be only 80 minutes long, which Ellis knew would not be enough to tell the full story he wanted, so was able to break apart his script into a trilogy of works, each part having a self-contained three-act structure; the first part would be to introduce the characters of Dracula, Trevor, Sypha, and Alucard and with a meaningful narrative resolution. In this manner, Ellis noted that if the other two parts were never greenlit, the first work "doesn't demand the presence of the other two parts for it to work as its own thing". Due to the limited time, Ellis opted to drop Grant Danasty, a pirate character in the game; Ellis noted that besides "the stupid name", he felt the pirate was misplaced in the setting and that the limited run time would not allow him to develop the character fully.

Sometime around 2008, work on the production stalled, and entered development hell. Ellis had completed his script in June 2008, and the show's production blog had said in August 2008 that they were shopping around the idea as a theatrical release, but no further updates followed before the blog was quietly deleted.

Around 2012, Adi Shankar was approached to direct a live-action version of Ellis' script. Shankar, who at the time had just finished work as executive producer of Dredd, said that the party was looking to make a film in the style of the Underworld films with a similar budget, representative of a small studio with large independent backing. Shankar turned the opportunity down, saying it felt "250 percent wrong", as he had deep respect for the original game and felt the live-action version would not treat it well. Shankar emphasized the importance of traditional two-dimensional animation in establishing the series' visual identity. He cited Japanese animated films such as Vampire Hunter D and Ninja Scroll as stylistic influences, and recalled that assembling an animation team capable of reproducing the desired hand-drawn aesthetic was one of the production's earliest challenges. Following this, Shankar stepped back from Hollywood to pursue more self-published works, stating that "the major studios were blatantly disrespecting fandom" as a reason he turned down the offer.

According to Ellis, Netflix was very positive about his original scripts that he wrote in 2007, and so he had to only make a few changes to fit the Netflix format while staying true to the version of the script Konami had accepted. Shankar was approached with the opportunity to produce the work, which he took as neither Powerhouse or Frederator sought to restrict his creative vision from Ellis' scripts. Fred Seibert and Kevin Kolde of Frederator Studios also co-produce. The series was produced by Frederator Studios and Powerhouse Animation Studios, animated by South Korean studio MUA Film, and directed by Sam Deats. Trevor Morris composed the show's music.

The show's art style was heavily influenced by the work Ayami Kojima did for Castlevania: Symphony of the Night. They also took ideas from director Satoshi Kon's works for character expressions and series such as Cowboy Bebop, Demon Slayer, and Berserk for inserting humor among the more serious elements. The show is produced using 2D hand-drawn animation, taking cues from Ninja Scroll and Vampire Hunter D. The manga series Berserk and Blade of the Immortal were also cited as inspiration, with one of the show's animation directors having previously worked on the Berserk films. The production works closely with Konami, the holders of the Castlevania franchise, who helped to identify small continuity issues but were otherwise very receptive towards the work.

The first season represents the first part of the trilogy that Ellis has laid out in 2007. Ellis said that the second season, completing the trilogy, is where he had been able to deviate somewhat from the game, and has been better anticipate the show's release on Netflix in terms of scenes and episode lengths. Shankar believes that there is an opportunity for more stories to be told borrowing from other games in the series, noting that overall he sees the series as "a story about a family and multiple generations of this family" with many tales to draw from. The production team for the second season included staff members who worked on Madhouse productions such as Death Parade.

Developing the character of Dracula, Adi Shankar made it clear that one of the series' main goals has been to paint Dracula not as a villain, but a tragic, doomed figure. According to him: "The best villains, in general, are the heroes of their own story and the trick to making Castlevania resonate was this idea that Dracula isn't a bad guy, he isn't a villain, he's just a person consumed with darkness. That first episode in Season 1 we start to see why he wants to eradicate humans. He's not just this mustache-curling, one-dimensional villain. What Dracula is doing is not really a war against humanity. It's more a suicide note."

The show's third season was greenlit by Netflix a few days after the broadcast of the second season. Shankar announced in November 2018 that he will also be leading an animated series based on Capcom’s Devil May Cry, which he acquired the rights for himself, and will make the show, alongside the Castlevania series, part of a shared "Bootleg Multiverse". In 2025 Shankar stated that he ended his involvement in Castlevania in 2019.

On March 27, 2019, Netflix announced they had renewed the series for a fourth season, stating on April 16, 2020, that it would be the series's final season.

== Release ==
The first season of Castlevania was released on Netflix on July 7, 2017. The series' second season began streaming on October 26, 2018; its third season on March 5, 2020; and its fourth and final season on May 13, 2021.

=== Home media ===
The first season of Castlevania was released on Blu-ray and DVD on December 4, 2017, by Viz Media. Included as extras were storyboards, art galleries and sketch art-to-animation animatic sequences. The second season was released on Blu-ray on November 5, 2018. The third season was released on March 23, 2020. It contained a filmed panel of the series' cast and crew from the 2019 New York Comic Con. The fourth season was released on Blu-ray and DVD on July 19, 2021.

== Reception ==
=== Audience viewership ===
According to Parrot Analytics, Castlevania was the most popular digital original series in the United States during July 6–19, 2017, with the show generating 23,175,616 "demand expressions" on average. According to Parrot Analytics, "demand expressions" indicate the "total audience demand being expressed for a title, within a country," measured by video streams and downloads as well as social media.

It remained the seventh most in-demand digital original show in the United States through October 11, 2017. By the end of 2017, Castlevania was the year's 15th most in-demand digital original series in the United States, averaging 18,137,196 demand expressions throughout the year. It was also one of the year's top 20 most in-demand digital original series in the United Kingdom (20th), Japan (4th), Brazil (10th), Mexico (11th), France (13th), Canada (14th), Germany (19th) and Australia (20th).

=== Critical response ===
Critical response of Castlevania
Season	Rotten Tomatoes	Metacritic
1	83% (29 reviews)	71 (6 reviews)
2	100% (17 reviews)	—N/a
3	95% (19 reviews)	—N/a
4	100% (13 reviews)	—N/a

==== Season 1 ====
The review aggregator website Rotten Tomatoes reported that 83% of critics have given the first season a positive review based on 29 reviews, with an average rating of 7.60/10. The site's critics consensus reads, "Castlevania offers spectacular visuals and a compelling adaptation in its all-too-short first season." It is the first video game adaptation in the site's history to receive a "Fresh" rating. Metacritic, which assigns a rating out of 100 to reviews from mainstream critics, reported that there were "generally favorable reviews" for the first season, with a weighted average score of 71 based on 6 reviews.

Dave Trumbore of Collider gave the series four stars out of five, praising the chemistry between the cast and comparing the violence with anime such as Ninja Scroll. Several reviews lauded the voice cast, particularly Graham McTavish as Dracula and Richard Armitage as Trevor Belmont. IGN also wrote glowingly of Warren Ellis's script, but felt some of his humor was a little jarring. The Verge gave a mixed review, noting that the gore did little to create a sense of danger and felt "intentionally flashy". It concluded that "Castlevania is ripe with potential, but also burdened with clichés." Dan Seitz at Uproxx left a negative review, writing that it tried too hard to find profundity in the story of the Castlevania series. He also cited issues with the pacing.

==== Season 2 ====
Rotten Tomatoes reported that 100% of critics gave the second season a positive review with an average rating of 9.00/10, based on 17 reviews. The critics consensus reads, "Castlevania sinks its fangs into vampiric lore during a devilishly fun second season that benefits from an expanded sense of scale and episode tally that allows the series to fully spread its leathery wings."

IGN gave the second season a score of 10/10, praising Ellis's approach to Castlevania as "witty and self-aware enough to poke fun at itself when necessary". In Collider's review for the second series, Dave Trumbore mentioned there "isn't a weak link in the cast here". Complaints were made towards the pacing and the screen time spent on Dracula's court in Season 2. Writing for GameSpot, Michael Rougeau was disappointed that Trevor's group spent the majority of their time in a library, and also said Dracula "does literally nothing in all the episodes we've seen so far. There's one medium length flashback in which he massacres a council of merchants who offended him, but it's not like that moves the story along". Rougeau concluded that the action was creatively executed, but he felt that the new cast was given more development and that the previous characters were left to "tread water". Film School Rejects echoed similar sentiments, who said the second season was more of a complement to the first one. McTavish and the rest of the voice cast were once again met with high praise.

==== Season 3 ====
The third season was also well received, with 95% of critics on Rotten Tomatoes giving a positive review with an average rating of 8.00/10, based on 19 reviews. The critics consensus reads, "Castlevania's stunningly animated third season continues to build on the game's lore by diving deeper into its characters with humor, heart, and a lot of bloody action."

Collider's Dave Trumbore gave the third season a glowing review, praising the action and declaring the show "one of the best video game adaptations ever made". This was echoed by IGN, who touted the show as "the best video game adaptation around". Ellis' approach to the source material and the voice cast remained points of particular praise.

==== Season 4 ====
The fourth season was positively received as well, with an approval rating of 100% on Rotten Tomatoes with an average score of 8.90/10, based on 13 reviews. The site's consensus reads, "A rewarding experience and bittersweet farewell, Castlevania's fourth season is a triumphant conclusion to an expertly crafted series".

IGN commended the series' ability to deliver a satisfying ending without feeling rushed. The animation as well as the voice cast were once again praised. Paul Tassi, writing for Forbes, criticized the pacing in the beginning of the season, but concluded that season four was "excellent" and "a full return to form for the series" after a mixed third season.

In a review of Castlevania in Black Gate, S.M. Carrière said "No one who knows me will be surprised at all by how much I love this show. It has all the things I adore – angst, great fight scenes, dark atmosphere, brilliant writing, angst, wry humour, loveable characters, angst... In all seriousness, it's a wonderfully dark show. Don't be fooled by the fact that it is animated. This show is not for children."

=== Influence ===
Castlevania languished as a concept and a script for over a decade, with resistance to non-comedy, adult animation at direct-to-video distributors, movie studios and television networks. Netflix took the chance during its most developmental period. The audience success changed the market's acceptance of dramatic animation series like Arcane and Blue Eye Samurai.

=== Best-of lists ===
Year	Publication	List	Placement	Ref.
2022	Entertainment Weekly	Vampire shows you need to watch	6th	
2024	Windows Central	Best 7 video game adaptations ranked	3rd	
2026	GamesRadar+	25 best shows on Netflix to watch in 2026	–	
2026	Looper	10 Best TV Shows Based on Video Games, Ranked	7th	
2026	TVLine	15 Best TV Shows Based on Video Games, Ranked	5th	
2026	TVLine	15 Best Netflix Original Animated Series of All Time, Ranked	10th	

=== Accolades ===
Year	Award	Category	Nominee(s)	Result	Ref.
2018	Behind the Voice Actors Awards	Best Vocal Ensemble in a New Television Series	Richard Armitage, Alejandra Reynoso, James Callis, Graham McTavish, Matt Frewer, Tony Amendola, and Emily Swallow	Nominated	
2018	Behind the Voice Actors Awards	Best Male Lead Vocal Performance in a Television Series	Richard Armitage	Nominated	
2018	Behind the Voice Actors Awards	Best Male Vocal Performance in a Television Series in a Guest Role	Graham McTavish	Nominated	
2018	Behind the Voice Actors Awards	Best Male Vocal Performance in a Television Series in a Guest Role – People's Choice	Graham McTavish	Won	
2018	Golden Reel Awards	Outstanding Achievement in Sound Editing – Sound Effects, Foley, Music, Dialogue and ADR for Short Form Animation	Gary Falcone, Paul Menichini, Roberto Dominguez Alegria, Tom Maydeck, Mark Mercado, and Cynthia Merrill (for "Witchbottle")	Nominated	
2018	IGN Summer Movie Awards	Best TV Animated Series	Castlevania	Won	
2019	Golden Trailer Awards	Best Animation/Family Poster for a TV/Streaming Series	Netflix and InSync PLUS	Won	
2022	Annie Awards	Outstanding Achievement for Animated Effects in a Television/Media Production	Tam Lu, Adam Deats, and Sam Deats (for "The Endings")	Nominated	

== Sequel ==
In July 2019, it was reported that new Castlevania series subsequent to the fourth season's release were in development, without the involvement of Warren Ellis (due to sexual misconduct allegations). A new series with a new cast of characters set in the Castlevania universe was confirmed in May 2021, which would not be a direct spin-off of the original Castlevania series, but rather a stand-alone sequel, focusing on Richter Belmont, Trevor and Sypha's descendant, and Maria Renard fighting vampires and demons in 1792 during the French Revolution. During Netflix's 2022 Geeked Week virtual event, the series' official title was announced as Castlevania: Nocturne. The series premiered in 2023 and adapts material from the 1993 video game Castlevania: Rondo of Blood.
