= Bootleg Universe =

Media company

- Formerly: Adi Shankar Productions; The Adi Shankar Brand; The Bootleg Universe
- Type: Privately held company
- Industry: Film and television, animation, gaming, comic books
- Founded: 2012
- Founder: Adi Shankar
- Headquarters: Beverly Hills, California, United States
- Key people: Adi Shankar
- Divisions: Adi Shankar Animation; Adi Shankar Productions; Adi Shankar Presents; Bootleg Software (Gaming)
- Subsidiaries: The Angry Metal Company; 1984 Private Defense Contractors
- Website: https://adishankar.com

Bootleg Universe Media Group is a media company founded in 2012 by Indian-American producer & television show creator Adi Shankar.

Bootleg Universe began as a series of YouTube parody fan films of established media properties, including Marvel's The Punisher in The Punisher: Dirty Laundry, a speculative Pokémon finale titled The End of Pokémon, and the Mighty Morphin Power Rangers satire Power/Rangers. It has since evolved into a comprehensive entertainment entity, producing a diverse range of content spanning live-action, animation, film, television series, documentaries, and video games.

Notable animation projects include the series Castlevania, The Guardians of Justice, and Captain Laserhawk: A Blood Dragon Remix. Notable feature film projects include Dredd, The Voices, and The Grey.

== Divisions, subsidiaries, labels, and holdings ==
=== Divisions ===
- Bootleg Universe – Focuses on reimagining and remixing popular culture, often blending different genres and styles to create an alternative take on familiar characters, formats, and settings. Projects include Guardians of Justice and Captain Laserhawk.
- Adi Shankar Animation – The brand focuses on adaptations of established franchises featuring mature themes and complex narratives. Projects include Castlevania and Devil May Cry.

=== Subsidiaries ===
- The Angry Metal Company – This studio, based in Gijón, Spain and specializing in adult-oriented animation and gaming, was founded in 2014 by Shankar, Luis Junquera, and Enol Junquera. Key projects include the short film Judge Dredd: Superfiend, the Gunship music video Dark All Day., and the video game Jay and Silent Bob: Chronic Blunt Punch.
- 1984 Private Defense Contractors – A feature film production and financing operation founded by Shankar, Spencer Silna, and Douglas Saylor. The company focuses on producing and financing elevated action and thriller genre titles from auteurs. Key projects include Joe Carnahan’s The Grey and Marjane Satrapi’s The Voices.

=== Labels ===
- Adi Shankar Presents – Projects released include Anurag Kashyap's Hindi language gangster epic Gangs of Wasseypur.

=== Holdings ===
- Heavy Metal Magazine – An American science fantasy comics magazine, first published in 1977. The magazine is known primarily for its blend of dark fantasy, science fiction, and steampunk comics.

== List of short films ==
=== 'One-Shot' short films ===
Popular Culture Satires Released Under 'The Bootleg Universe.'

- The Punisher: Dirty Laundry (July 15, 2012)
  - Live-action short film
  - Directed by Phil Joanou
  - Written by Chad St. John
  - Based on the character Punisher by Marvel Comics
  - Thomas Jane reprises his role as Marvel's anti-hero Frank Castle / Punisher from the 2004 film The Punisher.
  - Jon Bernthal has stated that the "Dirty Laundry" short film, served as an inspiration for his own portrayal of Frank Castle in the Punisher Netflix series.
- Venom: Truth In Journalism (July 20, 2013)
  - Live-action short film
  - Directed and written by Joe Lynch
  - Based on the character Venom by Marvel Comics
  - In a black and white homage to cult Belgian black comedy Man Bites Dog and set in the late 1980s, Ryan Kwanten stars as Spider-Man's nemesis Eddie Brock.
- Judge Dredd: Superfiend (October 27, 2014)
  - Animated web series
  - Directed and written by Enol and Luis Junquera
  - Based on the character Judge Dredd by Rebellion Developments
  - Loosely adapted from various Judge Dredd storylines such as The Return of Rico and Boyhood of a Superfiend. Originally as a 6-episode web series published on October 27, 2014, it was later published as a "Director's Cut" short film on January 4, 2016.
- Power/Rangers (February 23, 2015)
  - Live-action short film
  - Directed by Joseph Kahn
  - Written by Joseph Kahn, Dutch Southern and James Van Der Beek
  - Based on Power Rangers by Hasbro, Saban Capital Group and Toei Company
  - A dark reimagining of Mighty Morphin Power Rangers that explores a timeline where the Rangers lost. Starring James Van Der Beek and Katee Sackhoff.
- James Bond: In Service of Nothing (March 2, 2015)
  - Animated short film
  - Directed and written by Tyler Gibb
  - Based on James Bond by Ian Fleming Publications
  - An animated short film in the style of a film animatic, where after 30 years in the agency, James Bond is no longer required for his services leading to his retirement as he tries to adjust himself to a new life in the present.
- Mr. Rogers: A War Hero (March 20, 2018)
  - Live-action short film
  - Directed and written by Kenlon Clark
  - Based on Mister Rogers' Neighborhood by WQED Studios and The Fred Rogers Company
  - A "What if?" scenario based on the longstanding rumor where Fred Rogers served in the Vietnam War and based several characters on Mister Rogers' Neighborhood from his wartime comrades.
- The End of Pokémon (April 19, 2019)
  - Animated short film
  - Directed and written by Enol and Luis Junquera
  - Based on Pokémon by Nintendo and The Pokémon Company
  - An animated fake trailer for a dark afterward to the Pokémon series in which Ash Ketchum tries to end Pokémon battles after the apparent death of his Pikachu.

== List of television works ==
=== Television series ===
==== Series produced under 'Adi Shankar Animation' ====
- Castlevania (2017–2021)
  - When his wife is burned at the stake after being falsely accused of witchcraft, the vampire Count Dracula declares all the people of Wallachia will pay with their lives. He summons an army of demons which overruns the country, causing the people to live lives of fear and distrust. To combat this, the outcast monster hunter Trevor Belmont takes up arms against Dracula's forces, aided by the magician Sypha Belnades and Dracula's dhampir son Alucard.
  - The series is based on the video game series by Konami, and is written by Warren Ellis and produced by Frederator Studios, Powerhouse Animation Studios, Shankar Animation, Project 51 Productions and Mua Film. The first season of four 30-minute episodes was released on July 7, 2017. The eight-episode second season was released on October 26, 2018, the ten-episode third season was released on March 5, 2020 and the ten-episode fourth and final season released on May 13, 2021.
- Castlevania: Nocturne (2023–2025)
  - On May 11, 2021, Netflix announced that a new series set in the Castlevania universe with a different cast of characters was being planned. The series focuses on Richter Belmont, a descendant of Trevor and Sypha, alongside Maria Renard during the French Revolution. The eight-episode first season was released on Netflix on September 28, 2023, and the eight-episode second and final season was released on January 15, 2025.
- Devil May Cry (2025–present)
  - Based on the video game series of the same name by Capcom. The second animated adaptation after Devil May Cry: The Animated Series (2007). The eight-episode first season was released on Netflix on April 3, 2025 and the eight-episode second season was released on May 12, 2026. The series has been renewed for a third and final season.

==== Series produced under 'Bootleg Universe' ====
- The Guardians of Justice (2022)
  - A seven-episode live-action/animated superhero television series that satirizes DC Comics and the Justice League. The series was released on Netflix on March 1, 2022.
- Captain Laserhawk: A Blood Dragon Remix (2023)
  - In an alternate history 1992 where the United States has become the dystopian technocracy Eden, supersoldier fugitive Dolph Laserhawk leads a covert operations group called the Ghosts under supervision from Supermaxx.
  - The series was announced in June 2021. It is inspired by Far Cry 3: Blood Dragon while featuring remixed versions of several prominent Ubisoft properties. The series was released on October 19, 2023 on Netflix.

== List of film works ==
=== Feature films ===
==== Films produced under '1984 Private Defense Contractors' ====
- Machine Gun Preacher (2011)
  - Biographical Action Drama directed by Marc Forster and distributed by Relativity Media.
  - Starring Gerard Butler.
  - It tells the story of Sam Childers, a former gang biker turned preacher, and his efforts to protect, in collaboration with the Sudan People's Liberation Army (SPLA), the children of South Sudan from the atrocities of Joseph Kony's Lord's Resistance Army (LRA).
  - Chris Cornell wrote the song "The Keeper" for the film, which he performed on the Late Show with David Letterman and Jimmy Kimmel Live! to promote it.
- The Grey (2012)
  - Survival thriller directed by Joe Carnahan and distributed by Lionsgate.
  - Starring Liam Neeson.
  - The film grossed $81 million worldwide.
- Killing Them Softly (2012)
  - Gangster drama directed by Andrew Dominik and distributed by Weinstein Company.
  - Starring Brad Pitt.
  - Based on George V. Higgins' 1974 novel Cogan's Trade, the story follows Jackie Cogan, a hitman who is hired to deal with the aftermath of a Mafia poker game robbery that ruptured the criminal economy; the events are set during the 2008 United States presidential election and 2008 financial crisis.
- Broken City (2013)
  - Neo-noir written by Brian Tucker, directed by Allen Hughes and distributed by 20th Century Fox.
  - Starring Mark Wahlberg, Russell Crowe, and Catherine Zeta Jones.
- The Voices (2014)
  - Horror comedy directed by Marjane Satrapi, written by Michael R. Perry, and was distributed by Lionsgate.
  - Starring Ryan Reynolds.
- A Walk Among the Tombstones (2014)
  - An American neo-noir action thriller film directed and written by Scott Frank, starring Liam Neeson, and based on the 1992 novel of the same name by Lawrence Block.
  - The film was distributed by Universal Studios.
  - A Walk Among the Tombstones grossed $26 million in the United States and Canada, and $36.1 million in other territories, for a worldwide total gross of $62.1 million, against its $28 million budget.

==== Films produced under 'Bootleg Universe' ====
- Dredd (2012)
  - A science fiction action film directed by Pete Travis and written and produced by Alex Garland. It is based on the 2000 AD comic strip Judge Dredd and its eponymous character created by John Wagner and Carlos Ezquerra.
  - Karl Urban stars as Judge Dredd, a law enforcer given the power of judge, jury and executioner in a vast, dystopic metropolis called Mega-City One that lies in a post-apocalyptic wasteland. Dredd and his rookie partner, Judge Anderson (Olivia Thirlby), are forced to bring order to a 200-storey high-rise block of apartments and deal with its resident drug lord, Ma-Ma (Lena Headey).

==== Films produced under 'Adi Shankar Productions' ====
- Lone Survivor (2013)
  - A biographical war film based on the 2007 nonfiction book of the same name by Marcus Luttrell with Patrick Robinson. Set during the war in Afghanistan, it dramatizes the unsuccessful United States Navy SEALs counter-insurgent mission Operation Red Wings, during which a four-man SEAL reconnaissance and surveillance team was given the task of tracking down the Taliban leader Ahmad Shah.
  - The film was written and directed by Peter Berg, and stars Mark Wahlberg, Taylor Kitsch, Emile Hirsch, Ben Foster, and Eric Bana.
- Bodied (2017)
  - An American battle rap comedy-drama film directed by Joseph Kahn, written by Alex Larsen and produced by Eminem and Adi Shankar.
  - The film stars Calum Worthy as Adam, a graduate student who becomes a competitive battle rapper after becoming immersed in the scene while working on his graduate thesis on the subject.
- Ick (2024)
  - An American monster movie satire film directed by Joseph Kahn, and written by Samuel Laskey, Joseph Kahn, and Dan Koontz.
  - The film stars Brandon Routh and Malina Weissman.

==== Films produced under 'Adi Shankar Presents' ====
- Gangs of Wasseypur (2012)
  - Indian Hindi-language two-part epic crime film.
  - Directed by Anurag Kashyap and written by Kashyap and Zeishan Quadri.
  - Has gained a large cult following over the years due to its dark humor, experimental soundtrack, and its raw and realistic filmmaking style, considered a first for a Bollywood film.
  - In 2019, The Guardian listed it 59th on the 100 greatest movies of the 21st century.

== List of music video works ==
=== Produced under 'The Angry Metal Company' ===
- Song: Dark All Day (2018)
  - Artist: Gunship
  - Album: Dark All Day
  - Composer, Writer: Alex Gingell, Alex Westaway, Dan Haigh

=== Produced under 'Adi Shankar Productions' ===
- Song: The Thug Song (2016)
  - Artist: Bryce Vine w/ Skizz Marquee
  - Album: Non-Album Single
  - Writer: Bryce Vine & Sir Nolan

== List of literary works ==
=== Published under 'Bootleg Universe' ===
- Captain Laserhawk: Mega City Blues (November 8, 2023)
  - A prequel to the Netflix original animated series.
  - The comic book one-shot was supervised by Adi Shankar, written by Faouz.b, with art by Grelin, and published by Glénat Éditions.
- Captain Laserhawk: Crushing Love (March 12, 2024)
  - A prequel to Captain Laserhawk, the Netflix original animated series created by Adi Shankar featuring reimagined characters from Ubisoft's vast library of IP.
  - The manga published by Tokyopop was supervised by Adi Shankar, written by GLAAD Media Award nominated writer Ben Kahn, with art by Bayou Kun.

== List of music works ==
=== Produced under 'Adi Shankar Productions' ===
- Devil May Cry The Season 1 Soundtrack (April 3, 2025)
  - The album includes the original song "Afterlife" by Evanescence.

== List of gaming works ==
=== Produced under 'The Angry Metal Company' ===
- Jay and Silent Bob: Chronic Blunt Punch (2024)
  - Hand drawn, arcade style, side-scrolling beat-em-up with tag-team mechanics based on filmmaker Kevin Smith's Jay and Silent Bob IP.
  - The game offers a cooperative gameplay element where players can team up in two-player mode.
  - The game was produced in partnership with Interabang Entertainment and published by The MIX Games.
- Rugrats: Adventures in Gameland (2024)
  - Based on the Nickelodeon animated TV series Rugrats, which originally aired in the 1990s. The game follows the cast of the TV series through their imaginations after they are inspired by a commercial for a new, in-universe video game featuring the character Reptar.
  - The game features puzzle-platforming elements that combines NES era gameplay with contemporary design. The game offers a cooperative gameplay element where players can team up in two-player mode.
  - The game was produced in partnership with The MIX Games and Wallride, and published by Limited Run Games, the game was released in 2024 across multiple platforms including the NES, PlayStation 4, PlayStation 5, Xbox One, S, Nintendo Switch, and PC via Steam.

== Upcoming projects ==
=== Adi Shankar Animation ===
- Untitled Assassin's Creed series
  - A series based on Assassin's Creed by Ubisoft is in development.
- Untitled PlayerUnknown's Battlegrounds Project
  - An animated series based on PlayerUnknown's Battlegrounds by Brendan Greene and Krafton is in development.

=== Bootleg Universe ===
- Untitled Hyper Light Drifter series
  - A series based on Hyper Light Drifter by Playism and Heart Machine is in development.

=== Bootleg Software ===
- Untitled Bootleg Universe/Adi Shankar Videogame.
  - While promoting Captain Laserhawk, in an interview with Collider, Adi Shankar revealed that he was creative directing a video-game based on an iconic gaming intellectual property.
