= Dănulești =

Dănuleşti may refer to several villages in Romania:

- Dănuleşti and Muceşti-Dănuleşti, villages in Buda Commune, Buzău County
- Dănuleşti, a village in Gurasada Commune, Hunedoara County

== See also ==
- Dănești (disambiguation)
