= Power/Rangers =

2015 short film by Joseph Kahn

- Promotional release poster
- Directed by: Joseph Kahn
- Written by: Joseph Kahn; James Van Der Beek; Dutch Southern
- Based on: Power Rangers by: Haim Saban; Shuki Levy
- Produced by: Adi Shankar; Jil Hardin
- Starring: Katee Sackhoff; James Van Der Beek; Russ Bain; Will Yun Lee; Gichi Gamba; Tony Gomez; Matt D'Elia; Bree Olson; Amia Miley; Carla Perez; Adi Shankar
- Cinematography: Christopher Probst
- Edited by: Joseph Kahn
- Music by: Brain and Melissa
- Production company: Adi Shankar Productions
- Release date: February 23, 2015
- Running time: 14 minutes
- Country: United States
- Language: English

Power/Rangers, or Power Rangers: Unauthorized, is an American superhero fan short film based on the Power Rangers franchise; unlike the kid-friendly franchise, the short depicts an adult-oriented take on the source material. It was directed by Joseph Kahn, who co-wrote with James Van Der Beek and Dutch Southern, and produced by Adi Shankar and Jil Hardin. The short film featured an ensemble cast starring Katee Sackhoff, Van Der Beek, Russ Bain, Will Yun Lee, and Gichi Gamba. It was released on YouTube and Vimeo on February 23, 2015.

== Plot ==
After the Machine Empire defeats the Power Rangers and destroys the Megazord in battle, Earth's governments negotiate a truce with the Machine Empire and the Power Rangers are disbanded.

Years later, Rocky DeSantos, the second Red Ranger has defected to the Machine Empire, cynical and critical of Zordon's use of the Power Rangers as child soldiers, and now sports a prosthetic leg. While interrogating a restrained Kimberly Hart, the former Pink Ranger, about the location of Tommy Oliver, the former Green Ranger, he details the fates of the other Rangers in flashback:

- Jason Lee Scott, Rocky's Red Ranger predecessor, was gunned down eight hours after marrying Kimberly, when Farkas Bulkmeier and Eugene Skullovitch seemingly revealed their location to a police force (later dying of a meth overdose and drowning, respectively).
- Zack Taylor, the former Black Ranger, was an insatiable action junkie and "Hip Hop Kido" workout instructor who became a Machine Empire enforcer (seen taking down the North Korean Kim and his goons personally) before being murdered by an unknown assassin.
- Billy Cranston, the former Blue Ranger, became an openly-gay trillionaire who ended up buying Lockheed Martin and was found dead of an apparent suicide.

Rejecting Rocky's claim that Tommy is hunting down the Rangers, Kimberly tells Rocky that she has not seen him since the funeral of Trini Kwan, the former Yellow Ranger, who died during the treaty negotiations. Rocky acknowledges that he already knew that; she is really being held as bait to lure out Tommy. Tommy arrives and kills the guards, entering into single combat against Rocky in a sword duel. When Rocky gains the upper hand, Kimberly shoots and kills him, but Tommy demands to know who she is, revealing that the real Kimberly died during the final battle years earlier. The fake Kimberly's façade crumbles to reveal Rita Repulsa, who killed all the others: she distracted Jason during the shootout and executed Zack and Billy with gunshots. Rita attempts to lure Tommy into her plan of world domination (noting that she created him) but he denies her, attacking her as the film ends.

Several of the plot points make references to real-life incidents in the original Power Rangers actors' lives:

- David Yost, who played Billy, came out as gay after the series ended and was bullied by the original show's producers because of it, which caused him to leave the show and contemplate suicide.
- Thuy Trang, who played Trini, died in an automobile accident in 2001; Jason David Frank, who played Tommy, was unable to attend Trang's funeral (as he was burying his then-recently deceased brother at the time).

== Cast ==
=== Power Rangers ===
- James Van Der Beek as Rocky DeSantos, the second Mighty Morphin Red Ranger and the Blue Zeo Ranger
- Katee Sackhoff as Kimberly Hart, the first Mighty Morphin Pink Ranger
- Russ Bain as Tommy Oliver, the Mighty Morphin Green Ranger, the Mighty Morphin White Ranger, and the Red Zeo Ranger
- Gichi Gamba as Zack Taylor, the first Mighty Morphin Black Ranger
- Yves Bright as Billy Cranston, the Mighty Morphin Blue Ranger
- Stevin Knight as Jason Lee Scott, the first Mighty Morphin Red Ranger and the second Gold Zeo Ranger.
- Camilla Lim as Trini Kwan, the first Mighty Morphin Yellow Ranger

=== Others ===
- Will Yun Lee as General Klank
- Tony Gomez as Bulk
- Matt D'Elia as Skull
- Bree Olson as Divatox
- Amia Miley as Scorpina
- Carla Perez as Rita Repulsa; Perez had previously played Rita Repulsa in Mighty Morphin Power Rangers, making her the only cast member to reprise her role.
- Steffane Melanga as Cestria
- Adi Shankar as Billy's husband

== Release ==
Power/Rangers was released on February 23, 2015. Two versions of the film were released; the version hosted on Vimeo included brief nudity not present in the YouTube version.

=== Reception by original cast ===
Members of the original Mighty Morphin Power Rangers television series praised it, such as Austin St. John, Amy Jo Johnson and Steve Cardenas. Jason David Frank, the original Green Ranger, criticized the short film, thinking it was too violent and the fact the Power Rangers franchise is still being produced for children. However, he appreciated it on an "inner geek level".

Carla Perez, who played Rita Repulsa in Saban's American-filmed footage for Mighty Morphin Power Rangers and other television iterations (when the character was not portrayed through repurposed Japanese Super Sentai footage in which the character was played by Machiko Soga), made a brief appearance in this film as Rita.

=== Removal by Saban and restoration ===
On February 24, 2015, Vimeo chose Power/Rangers as a "Staff Pick". However, a few hours later Vimeo removed the film from its site entirely. On February 25, Vimeo released a statement that the film was removed due to a copyright claim from Saban, the original copyright holders of the Power Rangers franchise. On February 26, Saban had the film removed from YouTube, once again citing copyright claim. On February 27, Power/Rangers was restored to both Vimeo and YouTube.

=== Possible television follow-up ===
In February 2017, producer Adi Shankar had announced development, including writing the first season, of a dark reimagining of Mighty Morphin Power Rangers, although he had yet to sell to a network.
