= Dănești =

Dăneşti may refer to:

- House of Dănești, a ruling house of Wallachia
- Dănești, Gorj, a commune in Gorj County, Romania
- Dănești, Harghita, a commune in Harghita County, Romania
- Dănești, Vaslui, a commune in Vaslui County, Romania
- Dănești, a village in Frăsinet Commune, Călărași County, Romania
- Dănești, a village in Șișești Commune, Maramureș County, Romania
- Dănești, a village in Girov Commune, Neamț County, Romania
- Dănești, a defunct village in Mioarele Commune, Argeș County, Romania

== See also ==
- Dănulești (disambiguation)
