= The Voices =

2014 comedy horror film

- Theatrical release poster
- Directed by: Marjane Satrapi
- Written by: Michael R. Perry
- Produced by: Matthew Rhodes; Adi Shankar; Roy Lee; Spencer Silna
- Starring: Ryan Reynolds; Gemma Arterton; Anna Kendrick; Jacki Weaver
- Cinematography: Maxime Alexandre
- Edited by: Stéphane Roche
- Music by: Olivier Bernet
- Production companies: 1984 Private Defense Contractors; Babelsberg Studio; Mandalay Vision; Vertigo Entertainment
- Distributed by: Lionsgate (United States); Ascot Elite (Germany); Panorama Media (International)
- Release dates: January 19, 2014 (Sundance); February 6, 2015 (United States); April 30, 2015 (Germany)
- Running time: 104 minutes
- Countries: Germany; United States
- Language: English
- Budget: $11 million
- Box office: $2.2 million

The Voices is a 2014 English-language black comedy psychological horror thriller film starring Ryan Reynolds as a factory worker with schizophrenia whose hallucinations drive him to commit murder while conversing with his talking pets and the severed heads of his victims. Directed by Marjane Satrapi and written by Michael R. Perry, it also stars Gemma Arterton, Anna Kendrick, and Jacki Weaver.

It had its world premiere at the 2014 Sundance Film Festival on January 19, 2014. The film had a limited release theatrically and through video on demand on February 6, 2015, by Lionsgate. It received generally positive reviews from critics, with many highlighting Reynolds' performance.

== Plot ==
Plumbing fixtures factory worker Jerry Hickfang struggles with schizophrenia and lives above a bowling alley. He experiences vivid hallucinations, often manifesting as his pets—his good-natured dog, Bosco, and his antisocial cat, Mr. Whiskers—talking to him, but hides it from his court-appointed therapist, Dr. Warren. His condition causes him to be isolated from his coworkers, including Fiona, on whom he has an unrequited crush.

Jerry invites Fiona to a Chinese dinner theater, but she stands him up to do karaoke with her colleagues Lisa and Alison. When Fiona's car fails to start, she flags down Jerry as he drives by. While driving her home, a deer crashes through his windshield. Hallucinating that the deer is begging him to put it out of its misery, Jerry cuts its throat with a hunting knife. Terrified, Fiona runs into the woods, and Jerry follows, still holding the knife. He trips and accidentally stabs her, seriously wounding her. Tearfully declaring that he loves her, he repeatedly stabs her to death while apologizing.

At home, Bosco suggests Jerry go to the police, but Mr. Whiskers says that he should not be ashamed of killing. Jerry collects Fiona's body and admits to Dr. Warren that he no longer takes his medication. He dismembers Fiona, storing her remains in Tupperware containers. Her severed head begins talking to him, demanding he take his medication. Jerry does so, and experiences nightmares of his abusive father. He wakes up to find his hallucinations have ended; his pets and Fiona's decaying head no longer speak, and his run-down apartment is covered with garbage, animal waste, and blood. Horrified, Jerry washes his pills down the kitchen sink; when the medication wears off, his apartment becomes pristine again, and Fiona urges him to kill to provide her with "a friend".

Jerry then asks his other coworker Lisa on a date, taking her to his abandoned childhood home, where he intends to kill her. While he is there, he is overwhelmed by the memory of his mother's death. She was also schizophrenic, and when the authorities arrived to have her committed, she forced Jerry to slit her throat, leading him to be institutionalized instead. Comforting Jerry, Lisa kisses him, and he leaves his knife behind as she brings him home to spend the night together.

Fiona's remains are discovered by the police, implying her death was not as "clean" as Jerry's hallucination suggested. At Jerry's home, Fiona's head and the pets confront him over his urges to kill. Lisa surprises Jerry at home, but discovers the horrifying state of his apartment and Fiona's head. He struggles to explain himself as she tries to escape. Afraid she will tell his secret, Jerry throws her back into his apartment where she falls backwards, breaking her neck. Jerry curls up with Lisa as she lays dying and strangles her to end her suffering. Jerry dismembers her and places her head in the refrigerator beside Fiona's.

When Jerry's coworkers realize Lisa is missing and find an article about his mother's death, Alison goes to his apartment. Jerry kills her, keeping her head with the others, but becomes overwhelmed by the voices. He confesses his killings to Dr. Warren before kidnapping her and fleeing to the countryside, desperate for her help. She reassures him about managing her own intrusive thoughts, while Jerry's coworkers break into his apartment, discover his crimes, and call the police.

Jerry returns home with a captive Dr. Warren and police surround the building. Climbing down a vent into the bowling alley, Jerry accidentally breaks a gas pipe. Dr. Warren is rescued just before the gas leak causes an explosion. In the burning bowling alley, the voice of Mr. Whiskers urges Jerry to escape and continue killing, but the voice of Bosco tells him that life no longer has a place for him. Jerry listens to Bosco and succumbs to smoke inhalation, while Bosco and Mr. Whiskers are rescued and taken to an animal shelter.

In a white void, Mr. Whiskers and Bosco confess that despite their opposing beliefs, they did like each other. As the two go their separate ways, Jerry meets his parents, Fiona, Lisa, and Alison. Jerry apologizes to his victims as Jesus appears, and they all dance and sing a happy song together.

== Cast ==
- Ryan Reynolds as Jerry Hickfang and the voices of Bosco, Mr. Whiskers, the Deer, and Bunny Monkey
  - Gulliver McGrath as young Jerry
- Gemma Arterton as Fiona
- Anna Kendrick as Lisa
- Jacki Weaver as Dr. Warren
- Ella Smith as Alison
- Paul Chahidi as Dennis Kowalski
- Stanley Townsend as Sheriff Weinbacher
- Adi Shankar as John
- Sam Spruell as Dave
- Valerie Koch as Jerry's mother
- Paul Brightwell as Jerry's stepfather
- Alessa Kordeck as Sheryl
- Michael Pink as Jesus
- Stephanie Vogt as Tina TV

== Production ==
Before initial production, the script for The Voices received critical praise, including being listed on the Black List's Best UN-produced Screenplays of 2009. The film originally had Mark Romanek attached to direct in 2010, with Ben Stiller attached to star, but was never made due to budget issues. The project was brought up again in August 2012, when Marjane Satrapi was announced to be directing. When asked about having Reynolds perform all the voices Jerry hears in his head, Satrapi stated in an interview with Digital Spy, "At the beginning, the producer and myself said let's look for an actor, and then Ryan made the voices on his iPhone and he sent it over, and I was like, 'Who is that?' And suddenly it makes sense. That is the voices the guy hears, so who else but him can do it? It can only be him, so, yeah, it was an obvious choice."

Principal photography began in April 2013 in Berlin, Germany.

== Release ==
The film had its world premiere at the Sundance Film Festival on January 19, 2014. On March 5, 2014, it was announced Lionsgate had acquired distribution rights to the film. The film screened at the Toronto International Film Festival on September 11, 2014. The film was then released on video on demand and in limited release on February 6, 2015. In its opening weekend, the film made $5,000.

=== Critical reception ===
On Rotten Tomatoes, the film has an approval rating of 74% based on 98 reviews, with an average rating of 6.5/10. The website's critical consensus reads, "The Voices allows Ryan Reynolds to deliver a highlight-reel performance—and offers an off-kilter treat for fans of black comedies." On Metacritic, the film has a weighted average score of 58 out of 100, based on 24 critics, indicating "mixed or average reviews".

Brad Wheeler of Canada's The Globe and Mail gave the film three out of four stars and stated, "Think of this stylish, quirky and quite grisly feature from Marjane Satrapi as a meeting of Psycho, Dexter, and Dr. Dolittle."

In 2020, Reynolds said of the film, "One of my favorite movies I've ever done. Never really got its day in court, but man, it's weird and fun and beautiful."

=== Awards and nominations ===
- 20th annual L'Etrange Festival in Paris bestowed two awards on the film: the Canal+ Nouveau Genre Award (the festival's Grand Prize) and the equally prestigious Audience Award.
- 2015 Festival International du Film Fantastique de Gérardmer granted two more honors to the film: the Audience Award and the Jury Award.

== See also ==
- Blood List
