= Adi Shankar (producer) =

Indian producer

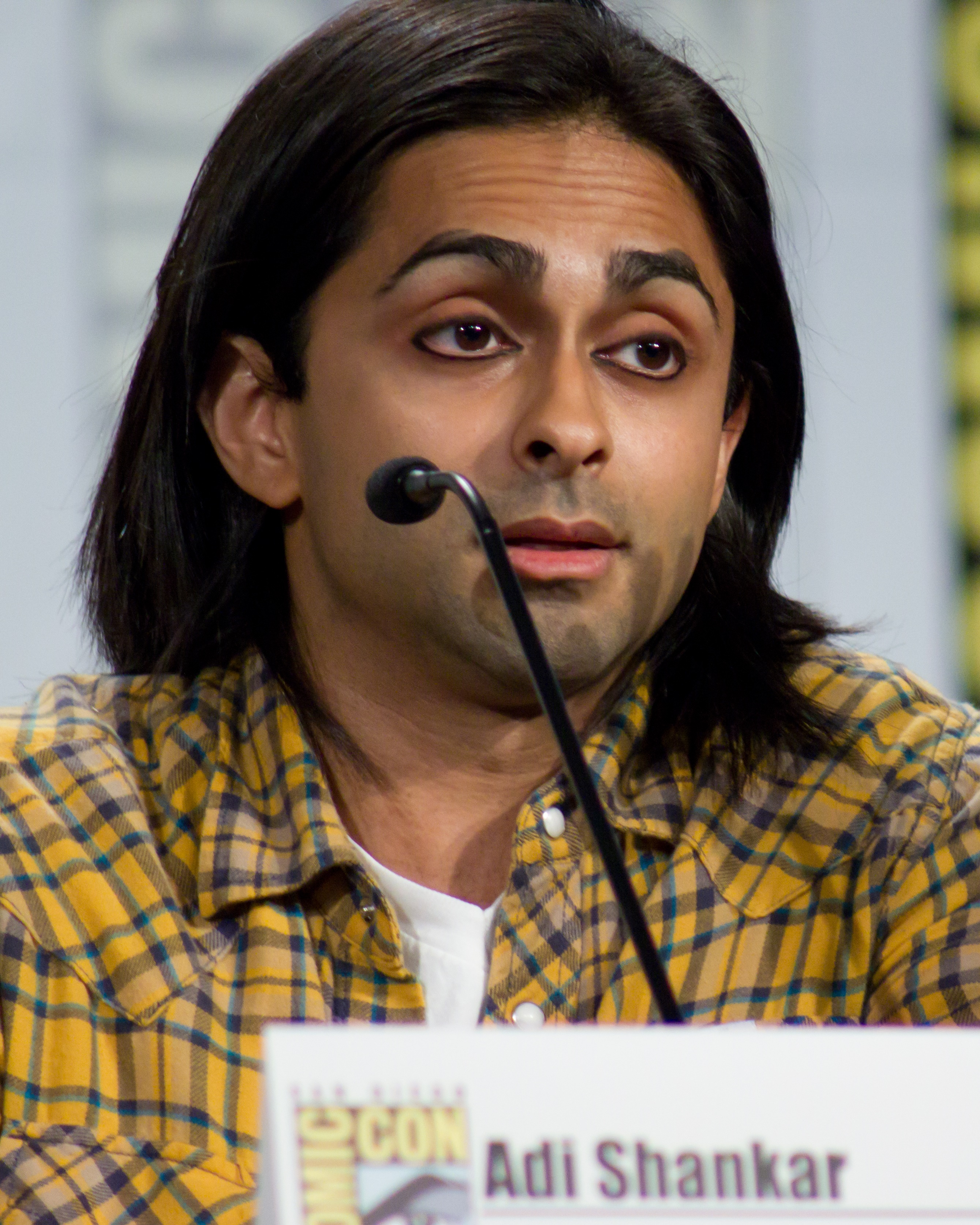
- Shankar at the 2013 San Diego Comic-Con
- Born: Aditya Shankar; 8 January 1985 (age 41); Calcutta, West Bengal, India (now Kolkata, West Bengal)
- Occupation: Filmmaker
- Years active: 2010–present
- Website: https://adishankar.com

Aditya Shankar (born 8 January 1985) is an Indian-American film producer, screenwriter, film director, television program creator, television showrunner, and occasional actor.

In the 2010s he was best known for producing the Judge Dredd film Dredd, showrunning the animated series Castlevania, and for creating his "Bootleg Universe" series of fan films. In the 2020s, he became known for creating the Netflix series The Guardians of Justice, Captain Laserhawk: A Blood Dragon Remix, and Devil May Cry.

He remains the youngest producer to have a number one film at the North American box office with the 2012 film The Grey. In 2014, Shankar ranked number 20 on GQ magazine's list of "Most Influential Global Indian Men". In 2010 he co-founded the production company 1984 Private Defense Contractors.

== Early life and education ==
Aditya Shankar was born in Kolkata, West Bengal, India, to a banking executive and an educator. His family spent his formative years relocating among Chennai, Mumbai, Hong Kong, and Singapore. He immigrated to Rhode Island, USA by himself at the age of 16. Shankar studied communications, business, and theater at Northwestern University and graduated in June 2007.

== Career ==
His Bootleg satires include The Punisher: Dirty Laundry, Venom: Truth in Journalism, and Power/Rangers.

In 2015, Shankar signed a three-picture deal with Disney's Maker Studios.

=== Influences ===
For his controversial "Bootleg Universe", Shankar cites British street artist Banksy as a major influence. In addition, Shankar frequently cites rapper Eminem, writer Warren Ellis, artist Takashi Murakami, wrestler Diamond Dallas Page and Final Fantasy VII character Sephiroth as artistic and stylistic influences.

=== "The Apu problem" ===
In April 2018, Shankar started a script contest which he hoped would encourage people to rewrite The Simpsons character Apu Nahasapeemapetilon "that takes the character of Apu and in a clever way subverts him, pivots him, intelligently writes him out, or evolves him". He stated that, in the event that the show's producers will not take on the winning script, he would produce and distribute the episode as part of his "Bootleg Universe" fan films.

On 26 October 2018, Shankar leaked during an interview with IndieWire that Apu was going to be written out of the show, stating that he got the information from two people who work for The Simpsons and a third source who works directly with creator Matt Groening. A representative for the show at Fox responded, saying, "Apu appeared in the 10/14/18 episode "My Way or the Highway to Heaven"." In the episode, Apu makes an appearance as one of dozens of characters gathered around God in Heaven. On 28 October, Simpsons executive producer and show runner Al Jean responded on Twitter by saying: "Adi Shankar is not a producer on the Simpsons. I wish him the best but he does not speak for our show."

The character was absent from the show for two years, and on 17 Jan 2020, Hank Azaria announced he was stepping down from the role of Apu permanently. Shankar has stated that he was against the cancellation of the character: "Silencing Apu is a step sideways. It doesn't undo the damage, address the damage or benefit the show's 'creativity.' It just removes another brown face from TV."

== Filmography ==
=== Film ===
Executive producer

Year	Title	Director	Notes
2010	Main Street	John Doyle	
2011	Machine Gun Preacher	Marc Forster	
2011	The Grey	Joe Carnahan	
2012	Dredd	Pete Travis	
2012	Killing Them Softly	Andrew Dominik	
2012	Gangs of Wasseypur	Anurag Kashyap	Shankar also presented the international release
2013	Broken City	Allen Hughes	
2013	Lone Survivor	Peter Berg	
2014	A Walk Among the Tombstones	Scott Frank	

Producer

Year	Title	Director	Notes
2014	The Voices	Marjane Satrapi	Also played John
2017	Bodied	Joseph Kahn	Also played Campus Security Guard
2024	Ick	Joseph Kahn	

=== Television ===
Year	Title	Executive producer	Writer	Creator	Showrunner	Notes
2017–2021	Castlevania	Yes	No	No	Yes	
2022	The Guardians of Justice	Yes	Yes	Yes	Yes	Also co-director
2023	Captain Laserhawk: A Blood Dragon Remix	Yes	Story	Yes	Yes	
2023–2025	Castlevania: Nocturne	Yes	No	No	No	
2025–present	Devil May Cry	Yes	Story	Yes	Yes	
TBA	Assassin's Creed †	Yes	No	No	No	
TBA	Hyper Light Drifter †	Yes	No	No	No	
TBA	PUBG †	Yes	No	Yes	Yes	
TBA	Duke Nukem †	Yes	No	Yes	Yes	

=== "Bootleg Universe" One-Shot Films ===
No.	Title	Directed by	Written by	Original release date
1	"The Punisher: Dirty Laundry"	Phil Joanou	Chad St. John; Adi Shankar (Concept)	2012
Thomas Jane reprises his role as Marvel anti-hero Frank Castle aka The Punisher from the 2004 film.
2	"Venom: Truth in Journalism"	Joe Lynch	Joe Lynch; Adi Shankar (Concept)	2013
In a black and white homage to cult Belgian black comedy Man Bites Dog and set in the late 1980s, Ryan Kwanten stars as Spider-Man's nemesis Eddie Brock / Venom as he is followed around by a documentary film crew. In a post-credits sequence, Shankar portrays rival documentary video director Sunil Bakshi, who is similarly following around the assassin Ben / Bullseye and filming him execute people.
3	"Judge Dredd: Superfiend"	Enol Junquera and Luis Pelayo Junquera	Enol Junquera and Luis Pelayo Junquera; Adi Shankar (Concept)	2014
An animated re-interpretation of Judge Dredd in the form of a violent Saturday morning cartoon. Does not take place in the continuity of the Shankar-produced 2012 film Dredd.
4	"Power/Rangers"	Joseph Kahn	Joseph Kahn, James Van Der Beek, Dutch Southern; Adi Shankar (Concept)	2015
A dark reimagining of the Mighty Morphin Power Rangers that explores a timeline where the Rangers lost, starring James Van Der Beek and Katee Sackhoff, with Carla Perez reprising her role as Rita Repulsa from various Power Rangers series from 1994 to 1998.
5	"James Bond: In Service of Nothing"	Tyler Gibb	Tyler Gibb; Adi Shankar (Concept)	2015
An animated short film in the style of a film animatic, where after 30 years in the agency, James Bond is no longer required for his services leading to his retirement as he tries adjust himself to a new life in the present.
6	"Mr. Rogers: A War Hero"	Kenlon Clark	Kenlon Clark	2018
A "What if?" scenario based on the longstanding rumor where Fred Rogers served in the Vietnam War and based several characters on Mister Rogers' Neighborhood from his wartime comrades.
7	"The End of Pokemon"	Enol Junquera and Luis Pelayo Junquera	Enol Junquera and Luis Pelayo Junquera; Adi Shankar (Concept)	October 24, 2019
An animated fake trailer for a dark epilogue to the Pokémon anime series.
8	"Superman Vs. the Ku Klux Klan"	N/A	N/A	Cancelled
Based on the book Superman Versus the Ku Klux Klan by Rick Bowers.

== Music credits ==
- 2025 – Devil May Cry (soundtrack) – Executive Producer, Soundtrack & Music. The album features the original song "Afterlife" by Evanescence.
- 2026 – Devil May Cry 2 (soundtrack) – Executive Producer, Soundtrack & Music. The album features the original song "See You in Hell" by Papa Roach featuring Hanumankind.
