= The Guardians of Justice =

American television series

- Genre: Superhero; Animation; Satire
- Created by: Adi Shankar
- Starring: Diamond Dallas Page; Sharni Vinson; RJ Mitte; Tiffany Hines; Hal Ozsan; Christopher Judge; Jane Seymour; Denise Richards; Derek Mears; Andy Milonakis; Brigitte Nielsen
- Composer: Oscillian
- Country of origin: United States
- Original language: English
- No. of seasons: 1
- No. of episodes: 7

Production
- Executive producers: Adi Shankar; Kenlon Clark; Shawn DeLoache; Graham Hughes; Jenni Powell; Stewart Yost; Vikram Salgaocar
- Producers: Samuel Laskey; Erick Geisler
- Production company: Bootleg Universe

Original release
- Network: Netflix
- Release: March 1, 2022

The Guardians of Justice (also known as Adi Shankar's The Guardians of Justice (Will Save You!)) is a live-action/adult animated mixed media superhero television series created, directed, written, and executive produced by Adi Shankar. The series is a Bootleg Universe production and a satire of DC Comics and the Justice League starring WWE Hall of Famer Diamond Dallas Page as Knight Hawk, a parody of an older grizzled Batman. The series was released on Netflix on March 1, 2022.

In the series, World War III ended c. 1947 with a victory by the alien superhero Marvelous Man. He managed to maintain planetary peace for 40 years, addressing the world in an annual speech for that period. In 1987, Marvelous Man seemingly commits public suicide during his last speech. In his absence, the world is on the brink of nuclear war. The deceased hero's lieutenant Knight Hawk rallies a superhero team to prevent the war. He covertly suspects that Marvelous Man was assassinated and views the other heroes as murder suspects. His investigation on the death uncovers a number of their personal secrets. Knight Hawk himself is a fascist and he is building a secret army in preparation for a coup d'état.

== Plot ==
After defeating Robo-Hitler and ending World War III, peace has been maintained on Earth for 40 years thanks to the alien superhero Marvelous Man (Will Yun Lee). In 1987, this peace is thrown into chaos with Marvelous Man's death. Marvelous Man's former lieutenant, Knight Hawk (Diamond Dallas Page), investigates his death with the help of the idealistic hero The Speed (Sharni Vinson) in order to prevent a nuclear war.

== Cast ==
- Diamond Dallas Page as Knight Hawk
- Sharni Vinson as The Speed
- Will Yun Lee as Marvelous Man
- RJ Mitte as Mind Master
- Christopher Judge as President Nicholas E. Nukem
- Jane Seymour as Addison Walker
- Denise Richards as Laura Louis
- Hal Ozsan as Van Dawson
- John Hennigan as Red Talon
- Derek Mears as Awesome Man
- Andy Milonakis as Phil Hart
- Brigitte Nielsen as Anubis Queen
- Jackson Rathbone as Blue Scream
- Tiffany Hines as Black Bow
- Kellan Lutz as King Tsunami
- Zachery Ty Bryan as President's aide
- Alyson Stoner as President's aide
- Preeti Desai as Golden Goddess
- Edi Gathegi as Mr. Smiles
- Chaz Bono as Whittaker

== Episodes ==
No.	Title	Directed by	Written by	Original release date
1	"Chapter 1: It Was Murder, She Said!"	Enol Junquera	Shawn DeLoache	March 1, 2022
After an alien superhero named Marvelous Man stopped World War III, the planet has been at peace under his care. Forty years later, Marvelous Man shocks the world by appearing to commit suicide during his yearly live address. Tensions rise and war looms in his absence, and his lieutenant Knight Hawk rallies the Guardians of Justice to step up. However Knight Hawk suspects that Marvelous Man's death may have been murder, and the culprit could be one of the Guardians themselves.
2	"Chapter 2: A Mentally Shattered Megalomaniac"	Kenlon Clark	Samuel Laskey	March 1, 2022
Knight Hawk begins investigating Marvelous Man's death, starting with the caltronite bullet that killed him. Suspecting one of the Guardians of stealing it, Knight Hawk begins surveilling his teammates. Meanwhile he reaches out to former protege Red Talon, and takes his current ward Little Wing to interrogate Marvelous Man's salacious therapist. Running low on leads, Knight Hawk uses the Cortex, an alien computer system that implicates The Speed and Motion Blur.
3	"Chapter 3: Anubis and How I Learned to Love the Nuke"	Enol Junquera	Samuel Laskey	March 1, 2022
Without Marvelous Man to keep them in check, Anubis terrorists are on the rise and world powers are drifting towards nuclear war. Red Talon sends junior superhero Sepia Spider into Anubis territory, but he is captured and killed. In a highly publicized spectacle, Red Talon attacks Anubis himself, and is also killed. Finally Knight Hawk sends Little Wing, who succeeds in killing the Anubis Queen.
4	"Chapter 4: You Can Own the Word 'Justice'"	Luis Pelayo Junquera	Shawn DeLoache	March 1, 2022
Knight Hawk investigations lead him to discover more of the Guardians' buried secrets, including King Tsunami's affair with Marvelous Man's wife, as well as Black Bow and Blue Scream's involvement with a rising street drug. Meanwhile, a romance blossoms between The Speed and Awesome Man.
5	"Chapter 5: When Guardians Fall in Love"	Enol Junquera	Samuel Laskey	March 1, 2022
Awesome Man is forced to save Knight Hawk when a confrontation with Golden Goddess becomes hostile. Awesome Man and The Speed go on a superpowered date. Meanwhile The Speed follows a lead of her own, where she confronts Motion Blur and learns information about Marvelous Man's death.
6	"Chapter 6: Shame Is a Lower Vibration than Anger"	Kenlon Clark	Shawn DeLoache	March 1, 2022
Knight Hawk's investigation closes in on Mind Master and Marvelous Man's most closely held secret, that they were in a relationship together. Knight Hawk kills Mind Master rather than let Marvelous Man's sexuality come to light, creating his own narrative instead. Meanwhile, The Speed learns about Knight Hawk's fascist agenda and a secret army he is building.
7	"Chapter 7: Proximity to Power Corrupts More than Power Itself"	Enol Junquera	Samuel Laskey	March 1, 2022
Knight Hawk begins using his army to take power. Armed with the truth about Knight Hawk, The Speed and Awesome Man plan to unite the other Guardians to take him down. She attacks to pave the way, only to discover that Awesome Man was secretly Little Wing in an alternate form. At Knight Hawk's orders, he kills her "for the greater good."

== Production ==
=== Development ===
On July 29, 2015, HBO was set to develop Adi Shankar's Gods And Secrets with Adi Shankar writing, showrunning and directing the tragic superhero satire. On September 27, 2021, the series became The Guardians of Justice with Shankar showrunning the hybrid-animation tragic superhero satire. On October 13, 2021, Shankar revealed that his vision included the use of multiple mediums and tones.

=== Casting process ===
On July 29, 2015, Diamond Dallas Page, Jackson Rathbone, Kellan Lutz, Sharni Vinson and Andy Milonakis were cast in the series. On September 27, 2021, Hal Ozsan, Derek Mears, Christopher Judge, Brigitte Nielsen, RJ Mitte, and Zachery Ty Bryan were revealed to be in the series.

Believing that most artists have a broader range of performance capability than the professional industry classifies them into, Shankar said he wanted to cast the series with an eclectic mix of actors to capture the feeling of the world coming together. Carmen Aiello was the casting director for the entire series and was later credited by Shankar as the first Inclusivity Advocate on a television series.

=== Animation ===
On September 27, 2021, Graham Hughes was revealed to be lead graphic designer of the series. On October 13, 2021, Shankar revealed the origin of the multiple mediums were used.

== Release ==
On October 12, 2021, the series played in competition at the Canneseries festival in France. All seven episodes were released on Netflix on March 1st, 2022.

== Reception ==
Kevin Fox Jr. of Paste wrote that if a viewer can handle the combination of tongue-in-cheek filmmaking and extreme gore, the show was "worth the watch" to see its mixed commentary on the rise of the superhero genre in popular culture. Johnny Loftus writing for Decider recommended the show with a "Stream It" rating, citing the show's "riot of visuals and breathless narrative". Richard Urquiza of WinterIsComing.net praised the show for its "inventive, creative, and fast-paced" approach. Joshua Kristian McCoy in GameRant called it a "mixed-media experience that must be seen to be believed".

Tito W. James on Comicon.com compared the show to early hip hop artists, saying "Just as graffiti will appear as vandalism to some and street art to others The Guardians of Justice will be a polarizing series". Raja Sen, writing for Mint Lounge, said of the show "Shankar has created something highly original out of something all too familiar." Jonathon Wilson gave it four out of five stars in his review for ReadySteadyCut, saying "Any even remotely geek-savvy viewer will delight in picking up every reference".
