= Dredd =

2012 sci-fi action film by Pete Travis

- Theatrical release poster
- Directed by: Pete Travis (Note: While Pete Travis was credited as the director, several sources credit Alex Garland with completing the film.)
- Screenplay by: Alex Garland
- Based on: Judge Dredd by: John Wagner; Carlos Ezquerra
- Produced by: Andrew Macdonald; Allon Reich; Alex Garland
- Starring: Karl Urban; Olivia Thirlby; Wood Harris; Lena Headey
- Cinematography: Anthony Dod Mantle
- Edited by: Mark Eckersley
- Music by: Paul Leonard-Morgan
- Production companies: Reliance Entertainment; IM Global; DNA Films
- Distributed by: Entertainment Film Distributors (United Kingdom); United International Pictures (South Africa)
- Release dates: 11 July 2012 (San Diego Comic-Con); 7 September 2012 (United Kingdom); 28 September 2012 (South Africa)
- Running time: 95 minutes
- Countries: United Kingdom; South Africa
- Language: English
- Budget: $30–45 million
- Box office: $41.5 million

Dredd (Note: Previously promoted as Dredd 3D) is a 2012 science fiction action film directed by Pete Travis and written and produced by Alex Garland. It is based on the 2000 AD comic strip Judge Dredd and its eponymous character created by John Wagner and Carlos Ezquerra. Karl Urban stars as Judge Dredd, a law enforcer given the power of judge, jury, and executioner in a vast, dystopic metropolis called Mega-City One that lies in a post-apocalyptic wasteland. Dredd and his rookie partner, Judge Anderson (Olivia Thirlby), are forced to bring order to a 200-storey high-rise block of apartments and deal with its resident drug lord, Ma-Ma (Lena Headey).

Garland began writing the script in 2006, although the development of a new Judge Dredd film adaptation, unrelated to the 1995 film Judge Dredd, was not announced until December 2008. Produced by British studio DNA Films, Dredd began principal photography, using 3D cameras throughout, in November 2010. Filming took place on practical sets and locations in Cape Town and Johannesburg.

Dredd was released on 7 September 2012 in the United Kingdom and on 21 September worldwide. Critics were generally positive about the film's visual effects, casting and action sequences, while criticism focused on excessive violence as well as a perceived lack of the satirical elements that are found in the source comic. Despite the positive critical response, the film earned just over $41 million at the box office on an estimated budget of $30–45 million. The theatrical gross made a sequel unlikely, but home media sales and fan efforts endorsed by 2000 AD's publisher Rebellion Developments have maintained the possibility of a second film.

== Plot ==
The future United States is a dystopic irradiated wasteland known as the Cursed Earth. On the east coast lies Mega-City One, a violent metropolis with 800 million residents and 17,000 serious crimes reported daily. The only force for order are the Judges, who act as judge, jury, and executioner. The Chief Judge tasks veteran officer Judge Dredd with assessing potential recruit Cassandra Anderson, who marginally failed the aptitude tests to become a Judge, believing her powerful psychic abilities can help in the Judges' failing war against crime. Dredd warns Anderson that disobedience, incorrect sentencing, or being disarmed will result in an automatic fail.

In a 200-storey slum tower block called Peach Trees, drug lord Madeline "Ma-Ma" Madrigal has three rogue drug dealers skinned and infused with Slo-Mo—an addictive new drug that reduces the user's perception of time to 1% of normal—before throwing them down the atrium from the top floor. Dredd and Anderson arrive to investigate the deaths and learn of the existence of Ma-Ma's drug den. Deciding to raid the den, they arrest Ma-Ma's henchman Kay, who Anderson psychically detects was involved in the executions, and Dredd decides to take him in for questioning. In response, Ma-Ma's forces seize the tower's security control room and seal the building using its nuclear blast shields to prevent the Judges from leaving or summoning help.

Ma-Ma instructs the residents to kill the Judges or hide, forcing Dredd and Anderson to confront dozens of armed thugs. They reach the seventy-sixth floor where Ma-Ma and her men launch an assault with rotary cannons that tear apart the walls and kill numerous residents, although the Judges evade harm. Dredd and Anderson breach an exterior wall and summon backup. Angered by the innocent deaths caused during Ma-Ma's assault, Dredd beats Kay for information, deducing Ma-Ma is desperate to prevent him from being interrogated. Anderson intervenes and psychically torments Kay into revealing that Peach Trees is the center of Slo-Mo production and distribution. Although Anderson recommends waiting for backup to arrive, Dredd insists on pursuing Ma-Ma. A pair of armed teens confront the Judges and, while they are distracted, Kay frees himself and disarms Anderson, capturing and taking her by elevator to Ma-Ma's base on the top floor. Meanwhile, Judges Volt and Guthrie arrive to support Dredd, but Ma-Ma's computer expert convinces them that the blast doors are malfunctioning and cannot be opened.

While Dredd works his way toward Ma-Ma, she calls in the corrupt Judges Lex, Kaplan, Chan, and Alvarez, who enter the building. Kay tries to execute Anderson with her Lawgiver gun, but the DNA scanner does not recognize him and the gun explodes, destroying his arm before Anderson neutralizes him. Anderson escapes and kills Kaplan after reading her mind. Dredd, realizing the reinforcements are corrupt, initiates a firefight which kills Chan and Alvarez. Lex corners and wounds Dredd, before being fatally shot by Anderson.

Anderson obtains the access code to Ma-Ma's apartment from the mind of her computer expert and releases him after viewing his memories of torture and coercion at Ma-Ma's hands. Dredd admonishes her decision to release a suspect as a fail point and a crime. Anderson, in response, reminds him she already failed the assessment by being disarmed, and considers the computer expert a victim. The Judges infiltrate Ma-Ma's apartment where they kill most of her enforcers, although Anderson is shot and wounded. Ma-Ma reveals that, if Dredd kills her, a device on her wrist will detonate explosives on the top floors, destroying the building. Reasoning that the detonator's signal will not reach the explosives from the ground floor, Dredd forces Ma-Ma to inhale Slo-Mo and throws her down the atrium to her death.

With order restored, the Judges leave Peach Trees as reinforcements arrive. Dredd tells Anderson her assessment is complete and she surrenders her badge before leaving. The Chief Judge asks Dredd about Anderson's performance; he responds that she has passed.

== Cast ==
- Karl Urban as Dredd:
  A famed and feared Judge. Producer Allon Reich described Dredd as "an extreme character, and he administers justice with an extreme lack of prejudice". Urban approached the producers about joining the film. He found the role challenging because the character never removes his helmet, requiring Urban to convey emotion without using his eyes. He viewed the character as an average man with an insanely tough job in a fragmenting society and likened Dredd's heroism to that of a fireman. The role also demanded physical preparation; Urban undertook intensive physical training to become a "beast of a man". He also underwent weapons and technical training to learn how to operate under fire, arrest criminals and breach doors. He insisted on performing his own motorcycle stunts for the film. He played Dredd with a raspy and harsh vocal tone akin to "a saw cutting through bone", which he found difficult to sustain.

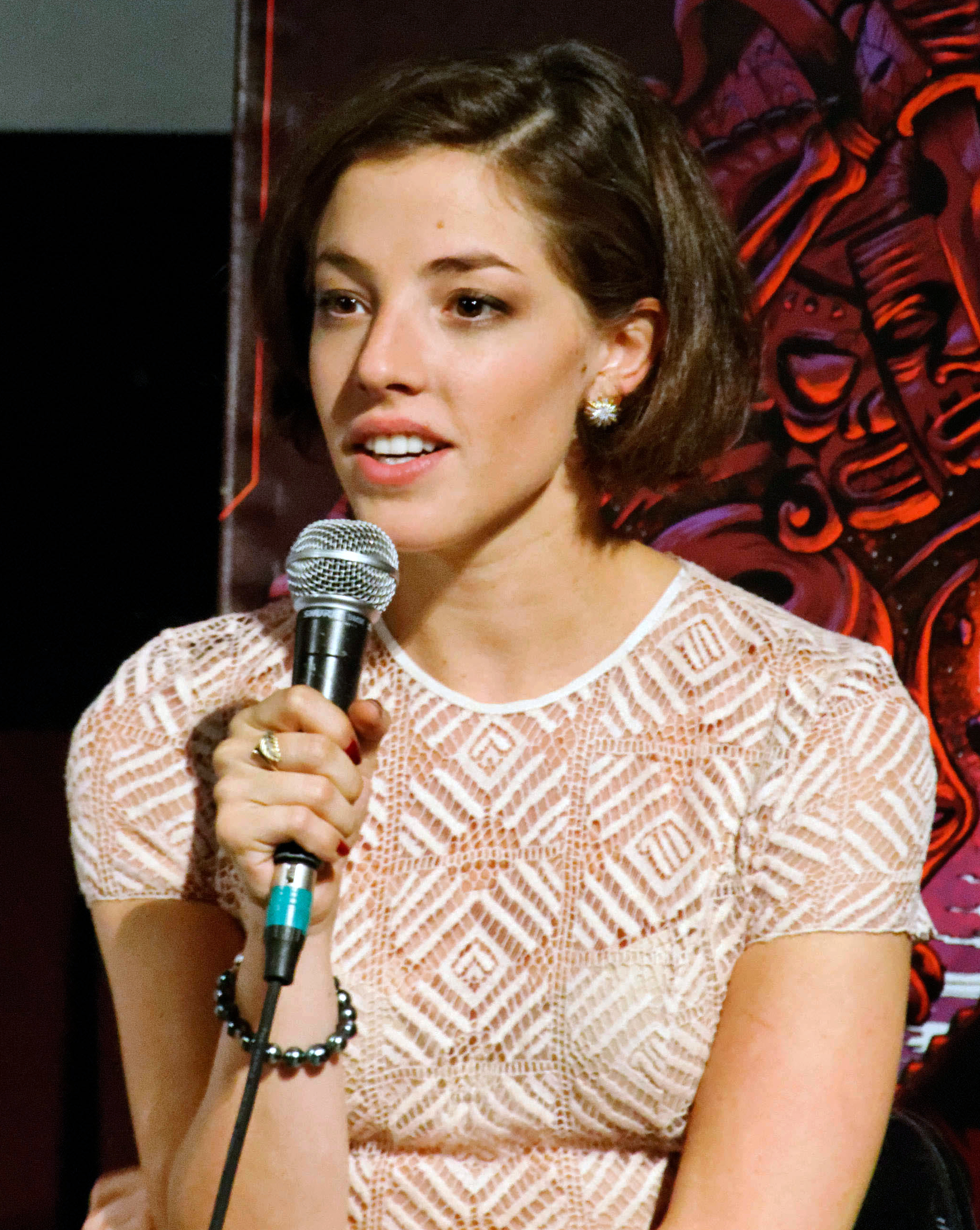
Olivia Thirlby promoting Dredd at the 2012 Fantastic Fest

- Olivia Thirlby as Cassandra Anderson:
  A rookie Judge and genetic mutant with powerful psychic abilities. Anderson can sense the thoughts and emotions of others. Thirlby contrasted her character with Dredd's "black and white" perspective, describing Anderson as existing "in a grey area where everything is enhanced or clouded by the fact [that] she knows what is going on in the very interior of a person". She undertook weapons and combat training, learning to perform a roundhouse kick to make her believably physically commanding. The character was partially inspired by singer Debbie Harry.
- Lena Headey as Madeline "Ma-Ma" Madrigal:
  A former prostitute turned drug lord and criminal kingpin who is the sole supplier of "Slo-Mo", a new and addictive drug. Headey's performance was inspired by punk-rock singer Patti Smith. Reich described the character as someone who does "not care at all about what anybody thinks or feels and she will do, and behave, as she wants". Headey said: "I think of [Ma-Ma] like an old great white shark who is just waiting for someone bigger and stronger to show up and kill her ... she's ready for it. In fact, she can't wait for it to happen ... She's an addict, so she's dead in that way, but that last knock just hasn't come." Before Headey's casting, the character was envisioned as a heavily made-up, scarred and obese older woman.
- Wood Harris as Kay:
  Ma-Ma's clansman. Harris described the character as a villain, but one that sees himself as no worse than the Judges. Harris said: " ... Dredd goes around literally judging and killing people if they do wrong ... Anyone who goes against the system might end up the bad guy. So I think Kay has justified fighting that in his mind."

The cast also includes: Domhnall Gleeson as the gang's unnamed computer expert; Warrick Grier as Ma-Ma's enforcer Caleb; DeObia Oparei as TJ, Peach Trees' medic; Francis Chouler as Judge Guthrie, Daniel Hadebe as Judge Volt, and Rakie Ayola as the Chief Judge. Langley Kirkwood, Edwin Perry, Karl Thaning, and Michele Levin portray, respectively, the corrupt Judges Lex, Alvarez, Chan, and Kaplan. Dredd also features Junior Singo as Amos and Luke Tyler as Freel, young boys who confront Dredd; Jason Cope as Zwirner, the thug executed by Dredd during the opening scene; Joe Vaz as Big Joe, the thug that leads the confrontation outside of the med station; Scott Sparrow as Japhet, Anderson's first execution; and Nicole Bailey as Cathy, Japhet's wife, in whose apartment the Judges take refuge.

== Production ==
=== Development ===
Development of the film was announced on 20 December 2008, although writer Alex Garland had begun working on the script in 2006. British studio DNA Films produced the film, and partnered with sales agency IM Global to sell the worldwide distribution rights. By May 2010, this partnership saw IM Global and its owner Reliance Big Pictures agree to co-finance the 3-D project with a $45 million production budget, and a schedule to begin filming in Johannesburg, South Africa in late 2010. Pete Travis was named as the film's director and Garland, Andrew Macdonald and Allon Reich would produce it. Duncan Jones had previously been offered the role of director. In a 2010 interview, Jones said that his vision for the film was unconventional—describing it as weird, dark, and funny—and it did not mesh well with Garland's script. In September 2010, it was reported that the film would be titled Dredd.

Pre-production commenced on 23 August 2010 at Cape Town Film Studios in Cape Town, South Africa. During the 2010 San Diego Comic-Con in July, Urban confirmed that he had been offered the role of Judge Dredd, and on 18 August 2010, it was reported that Urban had the role. In September 2010, it was announced that Thirlby would play Dredd's telepathic rookie Cassandra Anderson. In the same month during the Toronto International Film Festival, the film attracted $30 million in worldwide pre-sales to distributors in 90% of theatrical markets. The sales included a $7 million deal with British distributor Entertainment Film Distributors.

On 2 November 2010, Lions Gate Entertainment secured the North American distribution rights to Dredd. Headey joined the cast as drug-dealer Ma-Ma in January 2011. Judge Dredd creator John Wagner acted as a consultant on the film. In 2012, he confirmed that it was a new adaptation of the comic material and was not a remake of the 1995 adaptation Judge Dredd, which starred Sylvester Stallone.

=== Writing ===
Garland began writing Dredd during post-production of his other writing credit Sunshine, and completed his first draft while serving as an executive producer during filming of 28 Weeks Later. Garland's draft revolved around one of Dredd's main enemies, the undead Judge Death. He described the story as a "riff on the whole Judge system", but that it did not work because the Judge system had not yet been established and required too much knowledge about the Judge Dredd comic from the audience. He also considered the result too surreal and extreme. From this script, Garland decided that the story needed to be more focused and grounded. He instead considered adapting some of the notable Judge Dredd storylines, including "Democracy" (1986) and "Origins" (2006). He decided to avoid these lengthy tales in favour of a shorter, day-in-the-life story about Dredd and his function as a cop in the dystopian environment of Mega-City One. When developing the Judge Dredd character, Garland tried to closely follow that of the comic-book character, who undergoes only small personality changes over a lengthy period of time. He said:

...what John [Wagner] does [in the comic] is have Dredd evolve, in the way that a glacier moves: you look a year later and something actually has shifted! I tried to be true to that ... I didn't think Dredd could have a great epiphany, but there is definitely a change in him over the course of the movie. He makes a very clear statement at the beginning of the film which he then contradicts at the end. That's about as far as the shift goes." Garland intentionally gave the traditional character development to Anderson to compensate for Dredd's character stability.

Discussing the film's setting within the Peach Trees Block tower, Garland said the buildings were "like micro city states ... you could live and die in those buildings". He also considered that the setting met Wagner's suggestion that the future portrayed in Dredd should relate to modern ways of living. Garland named the tower after a restaurant called "The Peach Tree" in Shrewsbury, England, where he first met with Wagner. The budget limited his ability to represent some of the comic aspects of Mega-City One, such as robots and aliens. Throughout the production, Garland would send his script to Wagner, who would revise some of the dialogue. Urban would then further revise the script during his performance.

=== Design ===
The Slo-Mo sequences were designed over several years with the intention of replicating the effects of hallucinogenic drugs, combining high-speed photography and colour saturation. Alex Garland questioned if the effect could make the film's violence beautiful.

The filmmakers decided that Dredd should appear lean and fast like a boxer rather than bulky like "someone who spends hours sort of steroiding himself up." His Judge uniform was altered from the comic version; an extruded eagle statuette was removed from his shoulder pad to emphasise the outfit's functionality and give it a sense of realism. Garland said: "If you did a very faithful adaptation of the uniform you'd have someone who if he got stabbed in the stomach he'd be in big trouble. Dredd is out there on the frontline so he needed protection." Remaining faithful to the comic, Dredd's face, except for his mouth, is never shown and his helmet is not removed throughout the film. Urban said: "He is supposed to be the faceless representative of the law and I think that is part of his enigma ... You wouldn't get to the end of a Sergio Leone Western and go, 'God, I didn't even know the character's name!' It's irrelevant."

Dredd's signature weapon, the "Lawgiver" was developed as a fully operational weapon based on a 9mm firing system, capable of firing ammunition and being changed from automatic to semi-auto fire. His motorcycle "Lawmaster" was a modified 500cc motorcycle. A large fairing was added over the motorcycle with machine guns, an extended wheel base and the largest functional tyres possible. The vehicle was also operational and Urban insisted on riding it himself rather than relying on green-screen visual effects. Wagner described the necessity of adaptation from the source material and said that the 1995 film's attempt to directly replicate the comic's motorcycle was unable to steer because the tyres were too large.

Garland and VFX supervisor Jon Thum began developing the Slo-Mo concept sequences in 2009 during filming for Never Let Me Go. They experimented with an effect to replicate the visual effects of hallucinogenic drugs to see how long it could be used before it distracted the viewer from the story or action sequence. They continued to develop and modify the effect until the end of post-production, tweaking colours, colour saturation, image framing and camera motion. Slo-Mo scenes also feature a rainbow colour scheme and sparkle highlights to create an unreal and otherworldly effect. The filmmakers experimented with blood bags, prosthetics, shooting real bullets, and compressed air to see the effect of direct body hits in slow motion. In the finished film, compressed air was used to create impact ripples on flesh. Garland said the concept was inspired by nature documentaries that used high-speed photography to capture animals in slow motion. He said, "You see a whale or a shark breach the water ... then you'd stop thinking about the animal and you get transfixed by ... how water droplets connect and touch against each other. Somehow like a real [drug] trip, sort of stepping outside it but staying attached at the same time." He questioned whether the technique could be used with violence to make it purely aesthetic. He said: "Can it be so abstract that it becomes genuinely beautiful? ...really aesthetically beautiful even if someone is having their cheek blown out or their head crushing into concrete." Comic artist Jock provided concept art for the film design.

=== Filming ===
Final art of the city by VFX art director Neil Miller, with Peach Trees on the left. To highlight the scale of Mega-City One, the "micro-city state"–like towers were gradually positioned farther apart to emphasise their size and allow a more detailed city to emerge between them.

With a $30–45 million production budget, filming began on 12 November 2010 in Cape Town and took approximately 13 weeks, with second unit photography occurring over seven weeks. Filming locations included Johannesburg and Cape Town Film Studios (Dredd was the first project filmed at the studio). The project involved a majority of Cape Town crew members and about 40 imported crew. The producers chose to film in South Africa because of the lowered cost of employing cast and crew compared to locations in Europe and North America, and government incentives that offered to rebate up to 25% of the production costs. The film was shot digitally and primarily in 3D using RED MX, SI2K and Phantom Flex high-speed cameras for the Slo-Mo sequences, producing 4,000 frames per second. Multiple camera rigs were used. Some 2D elements were converted to 3D in post-production.

DNA Films' co-founder Andrew Macdonald engaged cinematographer Anthony Dod Mantle to manage the shoot; it was the first time Mantle had worked with 3D. The filmmakers wanted Dredd to have a realistic, visceral look, and drew inspiration from crime and gangster films. For scenes conveying the time and space altering effects of Slo-Mo, Mantle aimed to create images that would be beautiful but disorienting.

Mega-City One and its high-rise towers were created in Cape Town Film Studios. Finding a suitable set for the expansive Peach Trees atrium proved difficult, and the producers did not want to build an expensive set. While observing scouting photos of Cape Town, the filmmakers noticed a large three-walled external space that looked like an interior when filmed at night. A key sequence involving Ma-Ma and her gang firing rotary cannons across the atrium in their attempt to kill Judge Dredd required ten days of filming and eight different sets inside and outside the studio which were blended together with visual effects. Visual effects supervisor Jon Thum was unable to accompany a helicopter flight to obtain planned aerial shots of Johannesburg due to last-minute flight permissions; the resulting shots were non-specific and Thum had to pick out ones that could tell the story. Mantle had to develop new rigs to obtain close-up shots. Describing the aesthetic he aimed to achieve, he said: "I hope it will be more painterly. If we get it right, it will be a cross between Blade Runner and Clockwork Orange." Garland was a constant presence on the shoot; Urban turned to Garland for direction instead of Travis.

=== Post-production ===
The filmmakers experimented with the visuals of Mega-City One, including the design and positioning of the city's tower blocks, to create the impression that the city had risen out of the remains of another. They found that replicating the comic visuals of blocks close together made the blocks appear small. Instead, they allowed more space between the buildings to emphasise the larger buildings and allow for the presence of roads and cars to allow for extrapolation outside of the picture. Outcrops and appendages were added to break up the buildings' straight lines. On 7 October 2011, the Los Angeles Times reported that Travis was prohibited from participating in the editing process following creative disagreements between producers and executives. Garland took over the editing process; his contribution was considered significant enough for him to seek a co-director credit—a situation considered unusual as Garland had never directed a film before and had not been in charge of any filming. The disagreement concerned a disapproval over the footage that Travis was providing. Although Travis was removed from the editing process, he was monitoring the progress of the film. On 10 October, Travis and Garland released a joint statement saying that they had agreed on an "unorthodox collaboration" before production began, that Travis was still involved in the film and that Garland was not seeking a co-director credit. In March 2018, Urban said that he believed Dredd should be considered Garland's directorial debut.

=== Music ===
"Ma-Ma's Requiem"
Tracks matching the slow motion visuals of the film were composed with real instruments before being slowed down (0:21).

Paul Leonard-Morgan wrote the film's industrial music score. Leonard-Morgan created music to suit the film's futuristic setting. He experimented with band-based music, but decided it sounded over-produced and too safe. He turned to electronic music and used 1980s-style synthesisers and modern sound modules to create various combinations and applied distortion and other effects to the result. Leonard-Morgan said, "I was looking to create a timeless score which couldn't be placed in any particular era. So it's ended up being a cross between a modern dance track and evocative soundscapes." For scenes conveying the effect of the Slo-Mo narcotic, he composed new music with real instruments and then slowed the songs down to match the visuals, such that one second of his composed score could last ten minutes (slowed to 0.17% of original). He then added additional real-time score to the slowed track.

An unofficially altered Justin Bieber song served as inspiration for the Slo-Mo theme. Garland said that Portishead instrumentalist Geoff Barrow "sent me a link to a Justin Bieber song slowed down 800 times and it became this stunning trippy choral music." Morgan recreated the effect based on the modified track, which was used in the finished film. The film used Bieber's music as a temporary placeholder during editing before the score was finalised.

The film also features songs by artists including: "Poison Lips" by Vitalic; "Dubstride" by Yann McCullough and Gemma Kicks; "Snuffbox" by Matt Berry; "Pontiac Moon" by Robert J. Walsh; and "Jubilee (Don't Let Nobody Turn You Around)" by Bobby Womack.

== Release ==
=== Marketing ===
External videos
- The "Big Addicted" trailer on YouTube

In August 2012, the viral advertising site "Dredd Report" was launched, satirising the Drudge Report. The site featured a video condemning the use of Slo-Mo, and links to news about the film. A tie-in comic book was published; its plot serves as a prequel to the film's narrative and follows Ma-Ma's life as a prostitute, controlled by her pimp Lester Grimes. Ma-Ma forms a relationship with Eric—the creator of Slo-Mo. Lester kills Eric for interfering with his business, Ma-Ma castrates Lester with her teeth in retaliation and Ma-Ma takes over the Slo-Mo operation. The comic was written by Judge Dredd Megazine editor Matt Smith, drawn by 2000 AD artist Henry Flint and was released on 5 September 2012. An exclusive film poster featuring artwork by Jock was released by Mondo to promote the film's appearance at the 2012 Fantastic Fest in September 2012.

Dredd's marketing campaign won a Golden Trailer Award for Best Thriller TV Spot for the trailer "Big Addicted", and received nominations for: Best Action TV Spot, Most Original TV Spot, Best Graphics in a TV Spot, Best Music TV Spot, and Best Action Poster and Most Original Poster for the Dredd motion poster. Reports indicate that Lionsgate contributed $25 million to advertising and print costs.

Dredd premiered at San Diego Comic-Con on 11 July 2012. It was also screened at the Toronto International Film Festival on 6 September, and at the Fantastic Fest in late September. The film was first theatrically released on 7 September in the UK and on 21 September worldwide. A South African release followed on 28 September.

=== Box office ===
Dredd earned $27.6 million from markets outside of North America and $13.4 million from North America, for a total of $41 million. In the UK, Dredd grossed £1.05 million ($1.7 million) from 415 cinemas during its opening weekend. This made it the weekend's number-one film, the first film restricted to audiences over 18 years of age to do so since Saw 3D in 2010. In its second weekend, the film placed number five, earning £769,381. Dredd was primarily shown in 3D in the UK, and 2D screenings were notoriously limited as the distributor denied cinemas' requests for 2D prints; the decision was considered to have limited the film's audience where 2D was their preferred format. Dredd earned a total of $6.9 million in the UK.

In North America, pre-release tracking estimated that the film would gross between $8 and $10 million during its opening weekend based on its adult rating and the poor reputation of the 1995 adaptation. The film earned $2.2 million on its opening day and finished the weekend in sixth place, grossing $6.3 million from 2,506 cinemas—an average of $2,514 per cinema. The largest demographic of the opening weekend audience was over the age of 25 (69%) and male (75%). The film's North American run ended on 1 November 2012, after 42 days. Outside of the UK and North America, Dredd had its most successful total gross takings in China ($4.5 million), Russia ($4 million), and Australia ($2 million). Urban criticised the film's marketing campaign, saying that the film had "zero audience awareness. Nobody knew the movie was being released. Dredd represents a failure in marketing, not filmmaking."

== Reception ==
=== Critical response ===
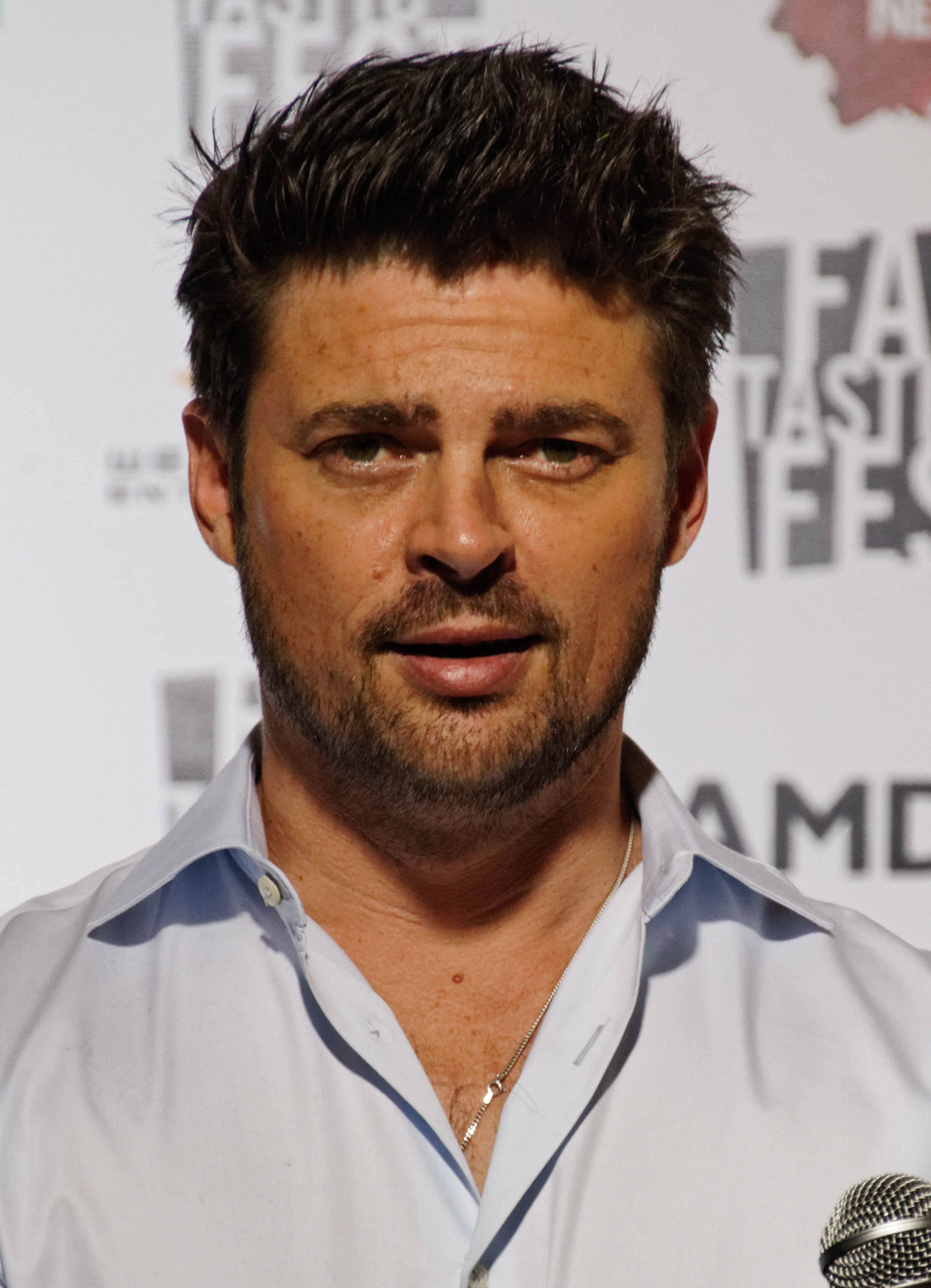
Karl Urban promoting the film at the 2012 Fantastic Fest. Critics praised his performance.

Since its premiere screening at the 2012 San Diego Comic-Con, Dredd received positive reviews from critics. On Rotten Tomatoes, the film has a rating of 80%, based on 171 reviews, with an average rating of 6.6/10. The website's critical consensus reads, "Fueled by bombastic violence and impressive special effects, rooted in self-satire and deadpan humor, Dredd 3D does a remarkable job of capturing its source material's gritty spirit." On Metacritic, the film has a score of 60 out of 100, based on 30 critics, indicating "mixed or average reviews". Audiences polled by CinemaScore gave the film a grade "B" on a scale of A+ to F. Some reviewers enjoyed its take on the titular character, with IGN praising it as a "character study".

Urban's acting was frequently praised, particularly his ability to perform a characterless figure. Entertainment Weekly's Darren Franich enjoyed his "credibly wry performance using little more than his gravelly, imitation-[Clint] Eastwood voice—and his chin". Indiewire argued that with the film, he "continues to distinguish himself as a versatile performer who turns mimicry into emotional meaning". Variety's Geoff Berkshire wrote the actor "does a fine job embodying the more mythic qualities of Dredd as an upright law enforcer no lowlife would want to confront".

Thirlby's Anderson was also highlighted, such as by Berkshire for carrying the film's emotional story and said, "one of the film's true thrills comes in watching Thirlby effortlessly balance the conflict between a Judge's merciless duties and a psychic's compassionate understanding." The New Statesman's Laura Sneddon noted that Dredd passed the Bechdel test, lacking in sexism or misogyny and positively portraying female characters who are no weaker, more sexualised or shown less than their male counterparts. Sneddon described Anderson as repeatedly shown to have power over men who underestimate her, while Ma-Ma displays more intelligence and sadism than any of her male gang members, and neither woman interacts with the other on the basis of their gender.

Many US newspaper critics were less taken with the film. Mark Olsen of the Los Angeles Times called it "a clunk-headed action picture" that "simply becomes a monotonous series of bad-guy confrontations". Frank Lovece of Newsday described it as a "soullessly gritty" film, which apart from one believable scene involving Thirlby, is "all tough-guy talk and humorless cynicism". Stephen Whitty of The Star-Ledger called it a "gray and ugly film", said that there was little to draw viewers in, and wrote that apart from the drug-induced slow-motion sequences, the film offers nothing new. The Hollywood Reporter's Stephen Dalton wrote that the "dark, ironic, very British humour of the original strip" was largely absent from the film and that "[t]he limited location, computer game-style plot and muted humour" of the film might disappoint some fans of the comic. Dalton also said that Urban's performance, while close to the comic, lacked something. Overall Dalton said, "[p]itched at the right level to please original fans, but still slick and accessible enough to attract new ones, [Dredd] feels like a smart and muscular addition to the sci-fi action genre."

The visual effects and slow-motion sequences induced by Slo-Mo received broad praise. Berkshire said that they are notable and eye-catching with "impressively utilised 3D." Hewitt said the visuals were "genuinely surreal splashes of heightened colour that ... don't outstay their welcome. The film's use of 3D is often excellent (including the credits) and it really comes to life in the Slo-mo scenes". Dalton said the film "constantly impresses on a visual level, with a gritty style more akin to cult hits like District 9 or 28 Days Later than to standard Hollywood comic-book blockbusters." Dalton said, "[Mantle's] first venture into 3D is a blaze of saturated colours, gorgeous high-resolution close-ups and dazzling slow-motion sequences." Dredd won The Art of 3D award at the 2013 Empire Awards, and was nominated for Best British Film and Best Science-fiction/Fantasy.

Judge Dredd creator John Wagner, who had been critical of the 1995 adaptation, gave a positive review of Dredd. He said: "I liked the movie. It was, unlike the first film, a true representation of Judge Dredd ... Karl Urban was a fine Dredd and I'd be more than happy to see him in the follow-up. Olivia Thirlby excelled as Anderson ... The character and storyline are pure Dredd." Dredd has been recognised as a cult film since its release. Some reviewers drew comparisons between Dredd and The Raid: Redemption, another action film released a few months earlier, noting that similar elements in setting, story, and characters made Dredd appear derivative. However, Garland and Urban explained that the timing of when the films were shot would have made plagiarism impossible.

=== Accolades ===
Year	Award	Category	Recipients	Result	Ref.
2012	IGN Summer Movie Awards	Best Comic Book Adaptation Movie	Dredd	Nominated	
2012	Golden Schmoes Awards	Best Sci-Fi Movie of the Year	Dredd	Nominated	
2012	Golden Schmoes Awards	Biggest Surprise of the Year	Dredd	Nominated	
2012	Golden Schmoes Awards	Coolest Character of the Year	Judge Dredd	Nominated	
2012	Golden Schmoes Awards	Most Underrated Movie of the Year	Dredd	Nominated	
2012	Golden Schmoes Awards	Trippiest Movie of the Year	Dredd	Nominated	
2013	Empire Awards	Best 3D	Dredd	Won	
2013	Empire Awards	Best British Film	Dredd	Nominated	
2013	Empire Awards	Best Science-Fiction/Fantasy	Dredd	Nominated	
2013	Golden Trailer Awards	Best Action Poster	Motion Poster, Lionsgate, Ignition Creative	Nominated	
2013	Golden Trailer Awards	Best Action TV Spot	Big Addicted, Lionsgate, FishBowl	Nominated	
2013	Golden Trailer Awards	Best Graphics in a TV Spot	Vision Review, Lionsgate, Seismic Productions	Nominated	
2013	Golden Trailer Awards	Best Music TV Spot	Big Addicted, Lionsgate, FishBowl	Nominated	
2013	Golden Trailer Awards	Best Thriller TV Spot	Big Addicted, Lionsgate, FishBowl	Won	
2013	Golden Trailer Awards	Most Original Poster	Motion Poster, Lionsgate, Ignition Creative	Nominated	
2013	Golden Trailer Awards	Most Original TV Spot	Slo-Mo Serious PSA, Lionsgate, AV Squad	Nominated	

== Home media ==
Dredd was released on DVD, Blu-ray and Digital Download on 8 January 2013 in North America, and 14 January in the UK. The Blu-ray edition contains the 2D and 3D versions of the film and a digital copy. The DVD and Blu-ray editions contain seven featurettes: "Mega-City Masters: 35 Years of Judge Dredd", "Day of Chaos: The Visual Effects of Dredd 3D", "Dredd", "Dredd's Gear", "The 3rd Dimension", "Welcome to Peachtrees", and a "Dredd Motion Comic Prequel" narrated by Urban. During its first week on sale in the UK, Dredd was the number 1 selling DVD and Blu-ray. During the week of its release in North America, it was the number 1 selling DVD and Blu-ray with approximately 650,000 units sold, and Blu-ray units accounting for nearly 50% of that figure. It was also the best-selling digital download for that period. Sales spiked in the United Kingdom in June 2013, following a reported rumour that it could influence DNA Films' decision to pursue a sequel. By September 2013, Dredd was estimated to have earned approximately $10 million in home media sales in North America, while in the UK it marked over 270 days in online-retailer Amazon's top 100 selling home media. By July 2017, this sales figure was estimated to have increased to $20 million.

== Reboot ==
At the London Film and Comic Con in July 2012, Garland said that a North American gross of over $50 million for Dredd would make sequels possible and that he had plans for a trilogy of films. A second film would focus on the origins of Dredd and Mega-City One, and a third would introduce Dredd's nemeses, the undead Judge Death and his Dark Judges. In August 2012, Garland said that a Judge Dredd television series would be a positive future step for the series. In September 2012, Garland said that he would explore the "Origins" and "Democracy" storylines, would introduce characters Judge Cal and Chopper, and would pursue the concept that Judge Dredd is a fascist. That same month, Macdonald said that further films would be made in partnership with IM Global and would likely be shot in South Africa.

In March 2013, executive producer Adi Shankar said that a sequel was unlikely. In May 2013, Urban said that a sequel was still possible, noting that the film had found an audience, and the response of fans could resurrect the project. Dredd fans on Facebook launched a petition calling for a sequel. In July 2013, 2000 AD endorsed the fan petition, supporting the campaign by printing advertisements in their publications, and by September 2013 it had attracted over 80,000 signatures. In April 2013, 2000 AD released an image teasing a continuation of the film in comic book form with a release date scheduled for September 2013. The comic, titled Dredd: Underbelly, was made available in Judge Dredd Megazine #340 which was released on 18 September 2013.

In October 2014, Shankar announced the production of an unofficial spin-off online series based on the Dark Judges that would be released later that month. The animated miniseries was titled Judge Dredd: Superfiend and all its six episodes were released on 27 October 2014 on YouTube. In March 2015, Garland said that a direct sequel would likely not happen in the near future, at least not with the crew involved in the original film.

In 2016, Urban said that "conversations are happening" regarding a Dredd continuation on streaming services Netflix or Amazon Prime. In an interview in May 2016, Urban said that while the film's "mishandled" marketing strategy and "unfortunate" box office performance meant that it was "problematic" to try to make a sequel, "the success it has achieved in all post-theatrical mediums has definitely strengthened the argument in favour of a sequel." In May 2017, a television series named Judge Dredd: Mega-City One was announced to be in development by IM Global Television and Rebellion. In August 2017, Urban stated he was in discussion to star in the series.

The series was eventually put on hold due to the pandemic back in 2020. Rebellion CEO Jason Kingsley explained to Radio Times back in 2020, "I want there to be a sequel [to Dredd]. We've got the rights back so we can do it, we've just got to get rid of this virus thing that's going on at the moment, and then hopefully things can kick off in all sorts of different areas of making film and TV, it's just– it's all very messed up at the moment for everybody".

"A lot of work has been done on all sorts of different scripts actually. So Mega-City One the TV show." He added. "Basically we can't go into production because of the [coronavirus pandemic] and we've got scripts and everything is ready to go but the problem is, because of the pandemic and everybody's funding changes and everybody's shifting around".

In 2025, it was reported that a new Judge Dredd film was in development. It is set to be directed by Taika Waititi with a script by Drew Pearce.

== Works cited ==
- "Dredd Production Notes". Lions Gate Publicity. Lions Gate Entertainment. Archived from the original (DOC) on 21 May 2013.
