= Answer song =

Song made in response to another song

An answer song, response song or answer record is a song (usually a recorded track) made in answer to a previous song, normally by another artist. The concept became widespread in blues and R&B recorded music in the 1930s to the 1950s. Answer songs were also popular in country music in the 1950s, 1960s, and 1970s, sometimes as female responses to an original hit by a male artist or male responses to a hit by a female artist.

The original "Hound Dog" song sung by Big Mama Thornton reached number 1 in 1953, and there were six answer songs in response; the most successful of these was "Bear Cat", by Rufus Thomas which reached number 3. That led to a successful copyright lawsuit for $35,000, which is said to have led Sam Phillips of Sun Records to sell Elvis Presley's recording contract to RCA.

In Rock Eras: Interpretations of Music and Society, Jim Curtis says that "the series of answer songs which were hits in 1960 ... indicates the dissociation of the singer from the song ... Answer songs rode on the coattails, as it were, of the popularity of the first song, and resembled parodies in that their success depended on a knowledge of the original ... Answer songs were usually one-hit flukes by unknown singers whose lack of identity did not detract from the success of the record since only the song, and not the performer, mattered."

Today, this practice is most common in hip hop music and filk, especially as the continuation of a feud between performers; the Roxanne Wars was a notable example that resulted in over a hundred answer songs. Answer songs also played a part in the battle over turf in The Bridge Wars. Sometimes, an answer record imitated the original very closely and occasionally, a hit song would be followed up by the same artist.

== Examples ==
=== Pre-1950s ===
- Sir Walter Raleigh and Christopher Marlowe traded life philosophies on the battlefield of poetry, namely, "The Passionate Shepherd To His Love" (1599) and "The Nymph's Reply To The Shepherd" (1600).
- The sentimental Irish ballad, "I'll Take You Home Again, Kathleen" (1875) by Thomas Westendorf was written as a reply to the earlier "Barney, Take Me Home Again" by George W. Persley.
- "I Wonder Why Bill Bailey Don't Come Home" was written by William Jerome and recorded by Arthur Collins in 1902 as an answer to "Bill Bailey, Won't You Please Come Home", published by Hughie Cannon and recorded by Collins earlier the same year.
- "I Used to Be Afraid to Come Home in the Dark" was recorded by Billy Murray in 1909 as a response to his own 1908 hit, "I'm Afraid to Come Home in the Dark".
- The popularity of the 1923 song "Yes! We Have No Bananas" was answered that same year by "I've Got The Yes! We Have No Banana Blues" with lyrics by Lew Brown, composed by Robert King and James F. Hanley. The song referred to the ubiquity and nonsense lyrics of the original. Eddie Cantor, Eva Taylor, Isabelle Patricola, and Belle Baker all sang on releases of this song.
- Patsy Montana's "I Want to Be a Cowboy's Sweetheart" (written 1934, recorded 1935), the first million seller hit by a female country artist, was an answer to Stuart Hamblen's "Texas Plains".
- Woody Guthrie's anthem "This Land Is Your Land" was written in 1940 as an answer to "God Bless America", written by Irving Berlin in 1918 (and revised in 1938). Guthrie originally called his response "God Blessed America for Me".

=== 1950s ===
- "Where's-a Your House", written and recorded by Robert Q. Lewis in 1951, was a response to Rosemary Clooney's "Come on-a My House" of the same year.
- "It Wasn't God Who Made Honky Tonk Angels", written by J. D. "Jay" Miller in 1952 and originally sung by Kitty Wells, was a response to "The Wild Side of Life", made famous that same year by Hank Thompson.
- "Mannish Boy" (1955) by Muddy Waters was a response to Bo Diddley's "I'm a Man", which also happened to be a response to "I'm Your Hoochie Coochie Man", an earlier song by Muddy Waters in 1954.
- "Hot Rod Lincoln" (1955) is Charlie Ryan's response to "Hot Rod Race", (1950) Arkie Shibley and His Mountain Dew Boys and is arguably the more well known of the two songs.
- "Bark, Battle and Ball" (1955) recorded by The Platters, was in response to the Bill Haley and His Comets version of "Shake, Rattle and Roll", recorded in 1954.
- "Can't Do Sixty No More", written and performed by The Dominoes, was a response to their own hit song from four years earlier (1951), "Sixty Minute Man".
- One of the longest answer record cycles was started by Hank Ballard and The Midnighters' (1954) R&B hit "Work with Me, Annie", and its sequel song "Annie Had a Baby" (1954). Answer songs include "Annie's Answer" (1954) by The El Dorados, "Annie Pulled a Humbug" (1954) by the Midnights, "Wallflower (Roll With Me Henry)" (1955) by Etta James, and "I'm the Father of Annie's Baby" (1955), by Danny Taylor. The Midnighters also recorded an "answer to the answer": "Henry's Got Flat Feet (Can't Dance No More)" (1955).
- "Nothing Can Replace A Man" (1955) from the musical Ankles Aweigh bills itself in its verse as an answer to Rodgers and Hammerstein's "There Is Nothing Like a Dame" (1949).
- "I Shot Mr. Lee" (1958) was The Bobbettes' response to their own 1957 hit, "Mr. Lee".
- "That Makes It" was Jayne Mansfield's response to The Big Bopper's "Chantilly Lace" (1958), suggesting what the girl may have been saying at the other end of the line.
- "Oh Neil!" was Carole King's response to Neil Sedaka's "Oh! Carol" (1959); Sedaka and King were both co-workers and friends since high school.
- "Short Mort" (1959) by Carole King was a response to Annette Funicello's "Tall Paul" (1959), referencing "Tall Paul" in the line, "You can keep Tall Paul, I'll take Short Mort."
- "Return of the All-American Boy" (1959) by Billy Adams was a response to the 1958 smash "The All American Boy" by Bill Parsons (aka Bobby Bare).
- "I Got a Job" (1957) by The Miracles, "I Found a Job" by The Heartbeats (1958), "I Got A Job" by The Tempos, and "I Got Fired" by The Mistakes, were all responses to The Silhouettes' self-penned chart-topper Get a Job (1957).
- "Answer To The Pub With No Beer" (1958) by Slim Dusty, was a direct response to Dusty's song A Pub With No Beer (1957).

=== 1960s ===
- "Tell Tommy I Miss Him" (1960) by Marilyn Michaels is a response to "Tell Laura I Love Her" (1960), recorded separately by both Ray Peterson and Ricky Valance. Versions of this answer song were also released by Skeeter Davis and Laura Lee.
- "I'll Save the Last Dance for You" by Damita Jo (1960) answers The Drifters' "Save the Last Dance for Me", sung by Ben E. King (also 1960). Another Damita Jo track, "I'll Be There" (1961), was in response to King's solo hit "Stand by Me" (1960).
- "He'll Have to Stay" (1960) was Jeanne Black's response to Jim Reeves' "He'll Have to Go" (1959), and was answered in turn by Johnny Scoggins' "I'm Gonna Stay" (also 1960).
- "(I Can't Help You) I'm Falling Too" (1960) was Skeeter Davis' response to Hank Locklin's "Please Help Me, I'm Falling", as was Betty Madigan's "I'm Glad That You're Falling" (1960).
- "There's Nothing on My Mind" (1960) was The Teen Queens' response to Bobby Marchan's "There's Something on Your Mind" (also 1960).
- "Yes, I'm Lonesome Tonight" (1960) was Dodie Stevens's response to Elvis Presley's "Are You Lonesome Tonight?" (also 1960).
- Johnny Tillotson’s 1960 hit “Jimmy’s Girl” was answered — by the same songwriters, Lee Pockriss and Paul Vance, using the same tune — with 1961’s “I’m No Longer Jimmy’s Girl” by Betty Jayne and the Teenettes.
- "I Really Want You to Know" (1961) was Skeeter Davis' response to Eddy Arnold's "I Really Don't Want To Know".
- "Come on Back, Jack" (1961) written by Mort Shuman and Leon Carr and recorded by Nina Simone, and "Well, I Told You" (also 1961), recorded by The Chantels, are both different responses to "Hit the Road, Jack", written by Percy Mayfield and recorded by Ray Charles.
- "Stay-at-Home Sue" by Linda Laurie and "I'm No Run Around" (both 1961) by Ginger Davis and the Snaps were responses to Dion's "Runaround Sue" (also 1961).
- "Hey Memphis" (1961) was LaVern Baker's response to Elvis Presley's "Little Sister" (also 1961).
- "Don'cha Shop Around" by Laurie Davis and "Don't Let Him Shop Around" by Debbie Dean (both 1961) were responses to The Miracles' "Shop Around" (1960). Both songs were written by Berry Gordy and Smokey Robinson.
- "My Big John" (1961) was Dottie West's response to Jimmy Dean's "Big Bad John" (also 1961).
- "My Long Black Veil" (1961) was Marijohn Wilkin's response to Lefty Frizzell's "Long Black Veil" (1959).
- "Return of the Teenage Queen" (1961) was country singer Tommy Tucker's response to Johnny Cash's "Ballad of a Teenage Queen" (1958).
- In 1961, Barry Mann’s hit asked “Who Put the Bomp (in the Bomp, Bomp, Bomp.” Using a concept very similar to their earlier success “Oliver Cool,” songwriters Lee Pockriss and Paul Vance answered Mann’s question: “J. P. Huckleberry Pierpont Tweedlesniff.” The artist credited on the answer record was Baron Sanford and the Ram-A-Lams.
- "Don't Wanna Be Another Good Luck Charm" (1962) was Jo's (of Judy and Jo) response to Elvis Presley's "Good Luck Charm" (also 1962).
- "(I'm the Girl from) Wolverton Mountain" (1962) was Jo Ann Campbell's response to Claude King's "Wolverton Mountain" (also 1962).
- The Pearlettes' "Duchess of Earl" (1962) was a response to Gene Chandler's "Duke of Earl" (1961).
- "Judy's Turn to Cry" (1963) was Lesley Gore's response to her own song "It's My Party" (also 1963). Both of these songs appear in her debut album I'll Cry If I Want To.
- "Blackhead Chinaman" (1963) was Prince Buster's response to Derrick Morgan's "Housewives Choice" (1961). Specifically, Buster claimed that Morgan and producer Leslie Kong stole hooks that Buster had created. Morgan responded with "Blazing Fire" and "No Raise, No Praise". The musical feud reportedly engulfed Jamaican culture to a level where the government ordered the two to appear in public together to calm the frenzied nation.
- "It Hurts to Be Sixteen" (1963) was Andrea Carroll's response to Neil Sedaka's "Happy Birthday Sweet Sixteen" (1962). Sedaka wrote the melody to both songs (each with a different lyricist; his brother-in-law Ronnie Grossman wrote the lyrics to "It Hurts to Be Sixteen" while Sedaka's songwriting partner Howard Greenfield wrote "Happy Birthday Sweet Sixteen").
- "Hello Melvin (This Is Mama)" (1963) was Sandra Gould's answer to "Hello Muddah, Hello Fadduh (A Letter from Camp)" (also 1963), a novelty song by Allan Sherman.
- The Beach Boys' "Don't Worry Baby" (1964) from Shut Down Volume 2 was said to be an answer to the Ronettes song "Be My Baby" (1963).
- The Beach Boys' "The Girl from New York City" (1965) from Summer Days (And Summer Nights!!) was a response to The Ad Libs' "The Boy from New York City" (1964).
- "Queen of the House" (1965) was Jody Miller's response to Roger Miller's "King of the Road" (1964).
- "That's My Life (My Love and My Home)" (1965) by Alfred Lennon, John Lennon's father, was a response to his son's song "In My Life" (also 1965), recorded by the Beatles.
- "Hurry, Mr. Peters" (1965) by Lorene Mann and Justin Tubb was a response to Roy Drusky and Priscilla Mitchell's "Yes, Mr. Peters".
- "Slip-In Mules (No High Heel Sneakers) " (1964) was Sugar Pie DeSanto's answer to "High Heel Sneakers" (also 1964), by Tommy Tucker.
- Wendy Hill's "Gary, Please Don't Sell My Diamond Ring" (1965) to Gary Lewis & the Playboys' "This Diamond Ring". (1965)
- "Dawn of Correction" by The Spokesmen is in response to "Eve of Destruction" by Barry McGuire (both 1965).
- "I'm The Girl On The Billboard" is Joyce Paul's response to Del Reeves' "Girl On The Billboard" (both 1965).
- "Morgan the Pirate" (1966) by Richard Fariña was believed by Fariña's producer Maynard Solomon, journalist Robert Christgau, and others to be a response to Bob Dylan's scathing "Positively 4th Street" (1965), of which Fariña may have been (or at any rate believed himself to be) the target.
- "4th Time Around" (1966) by Bob Dylan is seen as a response to "Norwegian Wood (This Bird Has Flown)" (1965) by the Beatles.
- "Evil Off My Mind" (1966) by Burl Ives was a response to Jan Howard's song "Evil on Your Mind" (1966).
- "When a Woman Loves a Man" (1966) by Ketty Lester was a response to "When a Man Loves a Woman" (also 1966) by Percy Sledge.
- French Johnny Hallyday's 1966 Cheveux longs et idées courtes is a riposte to a direct, personal mockery in a verse of Antoine's Élucubrations of the same year; both were hit songs. (See Antoine's rivalry with Johnny Hallyday).
- "I'm Happy They Took You Away, Ha-Haaa!" (1966) is Josephine XIV's response in the form of Napoleon's wife to Napoleon XIV's "They're Coming to Take Me Away, Ha-Haaa!" (1966). Another answer song is "They Took You Away, I'm Glad, I'm Glad", also written by Jerry Samuels.
- "Your Good Thing (Is About to End)" (1966), written by Isaac Hayes and David Porter, was originally recorded by Mable John, and served as a response to "You'll Lose a Good Thing" (1962) by Barbara Lynn.
- Jay Lee Webb's 1967 song, "I Come Home A-Drinkin' (To a Worn-Out Wife Like You)", was written as an "answer song" to his older sister Loretta Lynn's No. 1 1967 country hit "Don't Come Home A Drinkin' (With Lovin' on Your Mind)".
- "Clothes Line Saga" (1967) by Bob Dylan and the Band is seen as a response to "Ode to Billie Joe" (1967) by Bobbie Gentry.
- "Yes, I Am Experienced" (1967) by Eric Burdon and the Animals, was an answer to Jimi Hendrix's "Are You Experienced?" (1967).
- "Back in the U.S.S.R." (1968) by The Beatles was a response to "Back in the U.S.A." by Chuck Berry (1959) and "California Girls" by The Beach Boys (1965).
- "Billy, I've Got to Go to Town" (1969) by Geraldine Stevens was a response to "Ruby, Don't Take Your Love to Town" by Johnny Darrell (1967).
- "More on Ode to Billie Joe" (1969) by Rodd Rogers (aka Rodd Keith), Terri Peters (aka Teri Thornton), and the MSR Singers was a response to 1967's blockbuster "Ode to Billie Joe" by Bobbie Gentry.
- Joni Mitchell's "The Circle Game" (1970) is an answer to Neil Young's "Sugar Mountain" (1964).

=== 1970s ===
- "Hippie From Olema" (1971) was The Youngbloods' answer to Merle Haggard's country hit, "Okie from Muskogee" (1969).
- Paul McCartney and Wings's "Some People Never Know" & "Dear Friend" (both 1971), "Let Me Roll It" & "Nineteen Hundred and Eighty-Five" (both 1973), and "Silly Love Songs" (1976) all answered John Lennon's "How Do You Sleep?" (1971) which was John Lennon's response to "Too Many People" (1971) by ex-Beatle and Lennon's former collaborator Paul McCartney.
- "The Lawrence Welk-Hee Haw Counter-Revolution Polka" (1972) was Hee Haw host Roy Clark's answer to Gil Scott-Heron's "The Revolution Will Not Be Televised". "The Revolution Will Not Be Televised" was, in turn, a response to The Last Poets' "When the Revolution Comes."
- "I'm Mr. Big Stuff" was the 1972 response by Jimmy Hicks to "Mr. Big Stuff" by Jean Knight.
- "(Should I) Tie a Yellow Ribbon Round the Old Oak Tree?" was the 1973 response by Connie Francis to "Tie a Yellow Ribbon Round the Old Oak Tree" by Tony Orlando & Dawn.
- "Basketball Jones featuring Tyrone Shoelaces" (1973) was Cheech and Chong's parody of the romantic song "Love Jones" (1972) by Brighter Side of Darkness.
- "Sweet Home Alabama" (1974) was Lynyrd Skynyrd's response to Neil Young's "Southern Man" (1970) and "Alabama" (1972). Warren Zevon then wrote a response to "Sweet Home Alabama", titled "Play It All Night Long" (1980).
- "From His Woman to You" (1975) sung by Barbara Mason was the response to "Woman to Woman" (1974) by Shirley Brown. Mason further followed up her own response song with, "I Am Your Woman, She Is Your Wife", in 1978
- "Rak Off Normie" (1975) by Maureen Elkner was the response to "The Newcastle Song" (1975) by Bob Hudson.
- "(I'm A) Stand By My Woman Man" (1976) sung by Ronnie Milsap was the response to Tammy Wynette's "Stand By Your Man" (1968).
- "Two Out of Three Ain't Bad" (1977) by Meat Loaf was the answer song to "I Want You, I Need You, I Love You" (1956) by Elvis Presley.
- Johnny Thunders' "London Boys" (1978) is a response to the Sex Pistols' "New York" (1977).

=== 1980s ===
- "Love Will Tear Us Apart" (1980) by Joy Division was partly a response to "Love Will Keep Us Together" (1973) by Neil Sedaka and Howard Greenfield.
- Barbara Mason responded to Richard "Dimples" Fields' 1980 single "She's Got Papers on Me", with "She's Got the Papers (But I Got the Man)". She, again, followed up on her own response song with the track, "Another Man" in 1984, her last charting single to date.
- "Bad Boy" (1982) by Ray Parker Jr. was a response to his own hit of the same year, "The Other Woman".
- "I Was Country Before Barbara Mandrell" (1982) by Dave Dudley was a response to Mandrell's "I Was Country When Country Wasn't Cool" from earlier in the year.
- "Candy Girl" (1982) by New Edition was a response to "ABC" (1970) by The Jackson 5.
- "Major Tom (Coming Home)" (1983) by Peter Schilling was the response to David Bowie's 1969 song "Space Oddity".
- "Superstar" (1983) by Lydia Murdock was an answer song to "Billie Jean" (1983) by Michael Jackson.
- "Taxi (Take Him Back)" was Anne LeSear's 1984 response to J. Blackfoot's 1983 song "Taxi".
- Melba Moore's "King of My Heart" (1985) was an answer song to Billy Ocean's "Caribbean Queen" (1984).
- Blue Öyster Cult's "Spy In The House Of The Night" (1985) is about a pyromaniac who gets his kicks from being normal on the outside but a secret arsonist by night. It is also a shout out to The Doors song "The Spy" (1970), about a sexual voyeur.
- Reba McEntire's "Whoever's in New England" (1986) was a response to Barry Manilow's hit "Weekend in New England" (1975). "Whoever's in New England", in turn, inspired the 2007 answer song "Stay", written and sung by Jennifer Nettles.
- "Thunder & Lightning" (1986) by Miss Thang was a response to Oran "Juice" Jones's song "The Rain" from the same year. Other responses included "The Drain" by Leot Littlepage, and "After the Storm" by Stephan, also released in 1986.
- Actor Danny Aiello appeared in the Madonna video for "Papa Don't Preach" (1986), as the titular "Papa", and later that year recorded "Papa Wants the Best for You", written by Artie Schroeck, as a representation of the father's point of view.
- Similarly, Anya Major, who had appeared as the titular character in the music video of Elton John's "Nikita" (1985), recorded an answer song one year later entitled "Moscow Nights".
- "Guys Ain't Nothing but Trouble" by DJ Jazzy Jeff and the Fresh Prince (featuring Ice Cream Tee) was a response to "Girls Ain't Nothing but Trouble" from their 1987 debut album, "Rock The House" by DJ Jazzy Jeff and the Fresh Prince.
- "Grab it!" (1988) by L'Trimm was a cheeky answer record to "Push it" by Salt-N-Pepa (1985)
- "I'm Your Wild Thang" (1989) was Mamado and She's answer to Tone Lōc's "Wild Thing" (1988).
- "(Nothing But) Flowers" by Talking Heads contains lyrics that are an echo to Joni Mitchell's "Big Yellow Taxi"—"There was a shopping mall, Now it's all covered with flowers ... If this is paradise" in "(Nothing But) Flowers", whereas Mitchell sang "They paved paradise, And put up a parking lot ...".

=== 1990s ===
- R.E.M.'s "Me in Honey" (1991) is a response to 10,000 Maniacs' "Eat for Two" (1989).
- Bark Psychosis' Scum (1992) was an answer to Rozalla's Everybody's Free (To Feel Good).
- "Erasure-ish" EP (1992) was Björn Again's answer to Erasure's previous ABBA tribute, "Abba-esque". "Erasure-ish" features two Erasure tracks ("A Little Respect" and "Stop!") performed in the style of ABBA.
- "Fuck wit Dre Day (And Everybody's Celebratin')" (1993) was Dr. Dre and Snoop Dogg's answer to Tim Dog's "Fuck Compton" (1991) (as well as being a diss towards Eazy-E).
- Italian pop group 883 topped the charts for months with their hit "Hanno ucciso l'Uomo ragno" ("Someone killed Spider-Man"). Some time later, obscure comedy band Tretriti recorded their answer, "È vivo l'Uomo ragno" ("Spider-Man Lives").
- "The Devil Comes Back to Georgia" by Johnny Cash, Charlie Daniels, Mark O'Connor, and Travis Tritt in 1993 responds to the Charlie Daniels Band's "The Devil Went Down to Georgia" (1979).
- Liz Phair's Exile in Guyville (1993) album was a song-by-song response to The Rolling Stones' Exile on Main St. (1972).
- "I Wrote Holden Caulfield" (1994) was Screeching Weasel's response to "Who Wrote Holden Caulfield?" (1992) by Green Day.
- Third Eye Blind's song "Semi Charmed Life" (1997) was written as a response to Lou Reed's Walk on the Wild Side (1972), but from a San Francisco perspective.
- "The Boy Is Mine" (1998) by Brandy and Monica was a response to "The Girl Is Mine" (1982) by Michael Jackson and Paul McCartney.
- The Offspring's song "The Kids Aren't Alright" (1998) is named as allusion to The Who's "The Kids Are Alright" (1965).
- After TLC released the song "No Scrubs" in 1999, Sporty Thievz made an answer song called "No Pigeons" that same year.
- "A Pretty Girl Is Like..." (1999) from the album 69 Love Songs by The Magnetic Fields was an answer song to Irving Berlin's "A Pretty Girl Is Like a Melody" according to songwriter Stephin Merritt.
- "The Medication Is Wearing Off" (1998) from the album Electro-Shock Blues was the Eels (band) answer song to their own 1996 hit Novocaine for the Soul.
- "Heartbreaker (Desert Storm Remix)" by Mariah Carey was a response to "Ain't No Fun (If the Homies Can't Have None)" by Snoop Dogg.
- Mexican pop singer Alejandra Guzman's "Hey Güera" (Hey Blondie) is a response to Paulina Rubio's "Ese hombre es mío" (That man is mine).
- "Woman" by Neneh Cherry in 1996 is a response song to 1966's "It's a Man's Man's Man's World" by James Brown.
- "Old Before I Die" (1997) by Robbie Williams was in response to The Who's "My Generation" (1965), which contains the lyrics "I hope I die before I get old."

=== 2000s ===
- In 2001 Suzanne Vega wrote "(I'll Never Be) Your Maggie May" as a response to Rod Stewart's "Maggie May" (1971).
- The 2002 song "Aserejé" by Las Ketchup based its chorus on the 1979 song "Rapper's Delight" by The Sugarhill Gang.
- Travis Tritt wrote and released the song "Strong Enough to Be Your Man" in 2002 in response to Sheryl Crow's "Strong Enough" (1994).
- KJ-52 released the song "Dear Slim" (2002) in response to Eminem's song "Stan" (2000).
- "Can't Hold Us Down" by Christina Aguilera (2003) was a response to Eminem's song "The Real Slim Shady" (2000).
- "F.U.R.B. (Fuck You Right Back)" (2004) was Frankee's response to Eamon's "Fuck It (I Don't Want You Back)", promoting rumors that the two had been dating. It was the first answer song to reach No. 1 in the United Kingdom. Both songs had topped the charts in that country.
- Green Day's "American Idiot" (2004), from the album of the same name, was written in response to a Lynyrd Skynyrd song called "That's How I Like It" (2003).
- "You Should Really Know" by The Pirates, Shola Ama, Naila Boss and Ishani (2004) was an answer song to "I Don't Wanna Know" by Mario Winans, Enya and P. Diddy.
- The Beatnuts' song "Confused Rappers" (2004) was a response to Jennifer Lopez, Cory Rooney and The Trackmasters for stealing the sample of "Hi-Jack" by Enoch Light from their 1999 single "Watch Out Now".
- "Good Idea At The Time" (2005) on OK Go's "Oh No" album, was an answer song to The Rolling Stones' "Sympathy for the Devil" (1968): in it, the Devil argues that the historical atrocities enumerated in the original were entirely of human doing.
- Das Urteil by Kool Savas was a response to Die Abrechnung by Eko Fresh. Eko Fresh's song claims Kool Savas showcases a bad character during their time on Optik Records, while Kool Savas' song in return claims it was Eko Fresh who was a false friend during that time.
- "Me and Mr. Jones" (2006) on the Back to Black album by Amy Winehouse was an answer song to - at least a riff off the title of - "Me and Mrs. Jones" (1972), made famous by Billy Paul.
- Camera Obscura made the song "Lloyd, I'm Ready to Be Heartbroken" (2006) in response to Lloyd Cole and the Commotions 1984 song "Are You Ready to Be Heartbroken?".
- "I Walk Alone", popularized by Tarja Turunen, is a response to "Bye Bye Beautiful" by Nightwish.
- "Menor Que Yo" on Sentimiento (2007) album by Ivy Queen was a response to "Mayor Que Yo", a collaborative single by Daddy Yankee, Héctor el Father, Wisin & Yandel, Baby Ranks, and Tony Tun Tun.
- Worm Quartet expressed exasperation with Marc Gunn for releasing so many songs about cats, in a song called "Goddammit Marc Gunn, Shut Up About Your Cat". Gunn responded with a song of his own, called "Dear Worm Quartet".
- "Boys, Boys, Boys" (2008) on The Fame album by Lady Gaga was a response to "Girls, Girls, Girls" (1987) by Mötley Crüe.
- Mitch Benn's "Not Everybody Has to Imagine" (2008) is a reply to John Lennon's "Imagine" (1971).
- They Might Be Giants released the answer song "Why Does the Sun Really Shine? (The Sun is a Miasma of Incandescent Plasma)" to their popular 1993 cover of Tom Glazer's 1965 song "Why Does the Sun Shine?".
- "A Baker's Tale" by Dean Friedman (2009, released 2010 on the album Submarine Races) was a response to "The Bastard Son of Dean Friedman" by Half Man Half Biscuit (1987, on the album Back Again in the DHSS). In 2010, Friedman performed his song at a Half Man Half Biscuit concert; and accompanied the band during a performance of theirs.
- Russian pop band Vintage (Винтаж) composed their song "Eva" (Ева) from their SEX album as an answer to "Run from me" (Беги от меня) by Guests from the Future (Гости из будущего). In the original song, singer Eva Polna warns her significant other to run from her. In "Eva", singer Anna Pletnyova becomes a fan of Eva Polna writing her a love letter. Eva Polna agreed to re-record part of the original song to be included in Eva.

=== 2010s ===
- Everybody Was in the French Resistance...Now! released an album titled Fixin' The Charts, Vol. 1. As its title suggests, the album contains nothing but answer songs to pop hits. "G.I.R.L.F.R.E.N. (You Know I've Got A)", an answer song to Avril Lavigne's hit "Girlfriend", is one example.
- "California Gurls" (2010) by Katy Perry featuring Snoop Dogg was a response to "Empire State of Mind" (2009) by Jay-Z featuring Alicia Keys. It was the first time both the original song and the answer song reached No. 1 on the Billboard Hot 100.
- Taylor Swift's "Better than Revenge" (2010) is an answer to The Jonas Brothers' "Much Better" (2009) which may have been an answer to Swift's "Forever & Always" (2008).
- Marina and the Diamonds' cover of Justin Bieber's "Boyfriend" (2012) is an answer song to the original tune, the lyrics adapted to give it a female perspective.
- Lecrae made the song "No Regrets" (2012) in response to "The Motto" (2011) by Drake. Which itself is a response to "If Today Was Your Last Day" (2008) by Nickelback.
- Yasiin Bey (formerly Mos Def) released "Niggas in Poorest", (2012) in response to "Niggas in Paris" (2011) by Jay-Z and Kanye West, chastising them for parading their wealth while so many are suffering with poverty, violence, crime, and exploitation.
- Mary Lambert's "She Keeps Me Warm" (2013) is an extension of the chorus she sang on Macklemore's "Same Love" (2012). Where "Same Love" has a message of gay acceptance, "She Keeps Me Warm" is about a woman who falls in love with another woman and grows to accept her own sexuality.
- Ewert and the Two Dragons wrote their song "Jolene" on the album Good Man Down in response to Dolly Parton's 1973 single "Jolene" from the male perspective. Additionally, the 2017 song "Diane" performed by Cam sings from the perspective of Jolene.
- "Big Girls Cry" on Sia's 2014 album 1000 Forms of Fear is an answer song to Fergie's hit "Big Girls Don't Cry" (2007).
- "Anaconda" by Nicki Minaj (2014) is viewed as an answer to Sir Mix-a-Lot's "Baby Got Back" (1992), which is heavily sampled in the song. Whereas Sir Mix-a-Lot "sings the praises of the Black female body, but his focus remains on the pleasure it provides for the appreciative Black man", Minaj raps from the perspective of the unnamed woman, "giving voice to the woman who profits from her callipygian physique".
- Ellie Goulding's song "On My Mind" is seen as answer to Ed Sheeran's "Don't" by many critics, although Goulding herself has denied it.
- Christine and the Queens rewrote Beyoncé's "Sorry" from a male perspective.
- Esmé Patterson recorded Woman to Woman (2014), an album of seven answer songs from the perspective of famous women in pop songs, including "Eleanor Rigby", "Billie Jean" and The Kinks' "Lola".
- "The Quantum Enigma (Kingdom of Heaven Part II)" popularized by Epica is a response to "Kingdom of Heaven"
- Eels' 2018 single "Bone Dry" is an answer to their 2010 single "Fresh Blood". Fresh Blood was itself a sequel to their song "I Want to Protect You".
- "Paper Doll" (2013) by John Mayer is viewed as a response to Taylor Swift's "Dear John" (2010), and also mentions her song "22".
- In 2013, Kay One released his diss track "Nichts als die Wahrheit" against his former label mates Bushido and Shindy, as a response to Shindy's song "Alkoholisierte Pädophile", making fun of Kay One and his stepfather Olliwood.
- 3Think made "Shizuka (First Love)" (2014) in response to Leo Ku's "Nobita" (2004).

=== 2020s ===
- Coheed and Cambria's 2020 song "Jessie's Girl 2" is a sequel to Rick Springfield's 1981 song "Jessie's Girl". Featuring Springfield himself on the track, the song imagines what would have happened had Springfield succeeded in winning Jessie's girl.
- Sabrina Carpenter's 2021 single "Skin" and song "Because I Liked a Boy" from her 2022 album Emails I Can't Send are speculated to be responses to Olivia Rodrigo's "Drivers License", although Carpenter denies this. "Skin" mentions a line used in "Drivers License" about Carpenter's appearance, while "Because I Liked a Boy" recalls all the threats she received after Rodrigo's song was released.
- Roselia's 2022 song "Rozen Horizon" is a sequel to their 2019 song "Fire Bird", according the mini-album's page.
- Country trio Chapel Hart's 2022 song "You Can Have Him Jolene" answers Dolly Parton's classic "Jolene" almost 50 years later.
- Miley Cyrus's 2023 song "Flowers" paraphrases "When I Was Your Man" by Bruno Mars, in lyrics as well as in chord progression (Cyrus uses a simplified version of Mars' verse chords in her chorus) and even in some melodic patterns. While Mars sings about what "he" could have done better in the now broken relationship, Cyrus sings about how "she" is better now that she is alone. Cyrus also takes some melodic figures from "I Will Survive" by Gloria Gaynor.
- French singer Louane's 2025 song Maman references, and is considered a sequel of, her 2015 song of the same name.

== See also ==
- Diss track
- Song cycle
