= Oyda =

Oyda may refer to:

- Oyda language, spoken in the Gamo Zone of Ethiopia
- Oyda (woreda), an administrative division in southern Ethiopia
- "Oyda" (song), a 2022 song by Oxxxymiron
