= Oxxxymiron =

Russian hip hop artist (born 1985)

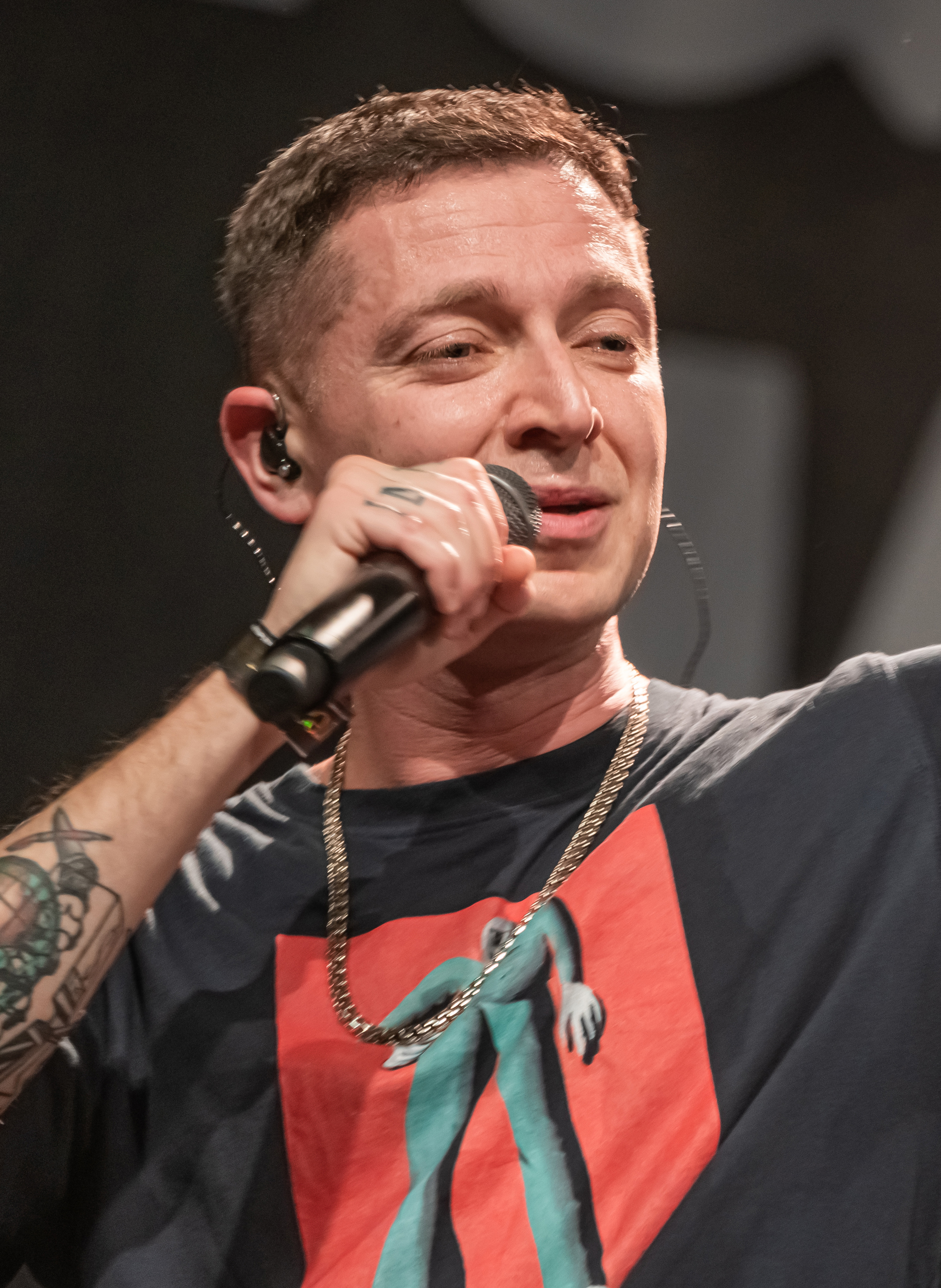
- Oxxxymiron in 2022
- Born: Miron Yanovich Fyodorov; January 31, 1985 (age 41); Leningrad, Russian SFSR, Soviet Union
- Other name: MC Mif (2001)
- Education: University of Oxford
- Occupations: rapper; songwriter
- Years active: 2001; 2008–present
- Musical career
- Genres: hip hop; grime; alternative hip hop; battle rap; conscious hip-hop
- Labels: Optik Russia (2008–2010); Vagabund (2010–2011); Kultizdat (2015–present)
- Website: oxxxymiron.com

Miron Yanovich Fyodorov (Russian: Мирон Янович Фёдоров; born 31 January 1985), known by the stage name Oxxxymiron, (Note: Sometimes rendered as Оксимирон or Oksimiron) is a Russian rapper and former CEO of the Booking Machine booking agency, as well as a co-founder and former member of the record label Vagabund. He is one of the most influential and prominent hip-hop performers in Russia, and his albums The Wandering Jew and Gorgorod are considered by the community as the most important releases of Russian rap.

== Biography ==
Miron Yanovich Fyodorov was born in 1985 in Leningrad, in a family of Russian Jews. His father is a theoretical physicist of the Konstantinov Institute of Nuclear Physics in St. Petersburg and his mother is a librarian. In St. Petersburg, Miron attended secondary school No. 185. When Fyodorov was 9 years old, his family emigrated to Essen, Germany. During his studies in Maria Wächtler School, Miron had a 'tense relationship' with his classmates because of his social standing and poor German. At the age of 13, Fyodorov began to write lyrics and rap in German and Russian under the name MC Mif (from Miron Fyodorov). When he was 15, the Fyodorovs moved to Slough, England. In 2004, Miron Fyodorov began studying at the University of Oxford, Balliol College in the faculty of English. During his studies Fyodorov was the president of the Russian community of Oxford. In 2006 he was diagnosed with bipolar disorder and had to stop studying, however he managed to continue studying after a break. In June 2008 he graduated from the university with a degree in English literature.

After university, Fyodorov moved to the East End where he restarted his musical career under the name Oxxxymiron. The name is derived from his first name Miron, rhetorical device oxymoron and triple X, representing the large amount of profanity in his lyrics. He was not able to find a job because of his perceived overqualification and had to work as a cashier, a translator, a loader, a guide, a stallman, a tutor, an MC and an office clerk. Fyodorov's life in London formed the basis of the script of the Russian 2015 TV series Londongrad.

=== Optik Russia (2008–2010) ===
In 2008, after a seven-year break, Oxxxymiron published a new track London Against All (Russian: Лондон против всех). In the same year he joined a German label Optik Russia where he met Dimitri Hinter (Russian: Дмитрий Хинтер), known by his stage name Schokk.

In 2009 Oxxxymiron participated in the 14th independent battle on Hip-Hop.ru and reached the semi-finals. One of the main intrigues of the battle was the correspondence confrontation of Oxxxymiron and underground anonymous rapper Babangida, which was expressed in mutual disses against each other in the tracks of both performers. However, due to the departure of Miron after the 8th round, the face-to-face confrontation between them never took place.

On 26 and 31 July of the same year, Miron's first concerts took place in Kyiv and Odesa.

=== Vagabund (2011) ===
In autumn 2010 Oxxxymiron and Schokk toured countries of CIS. In a year, Oxxxymiron, Schokk and manager Ivan Karoy aka Vanya Lenin founded an independent label Vagabund (Vagabond in German). On 15 September 2011, Vagabund published Fyodorov's first album The Wandering Jew (Russian: Вечный жид), which received a lot of positive reviews. On 30 October 2011 Vagabund gave their last concert. On 1 November 2011 Oxxxymiron left Vagabund due to conflict between the members of the label and Moscow rapper Roma Zhigan.

=== miXXXtape (2012–2014) ===
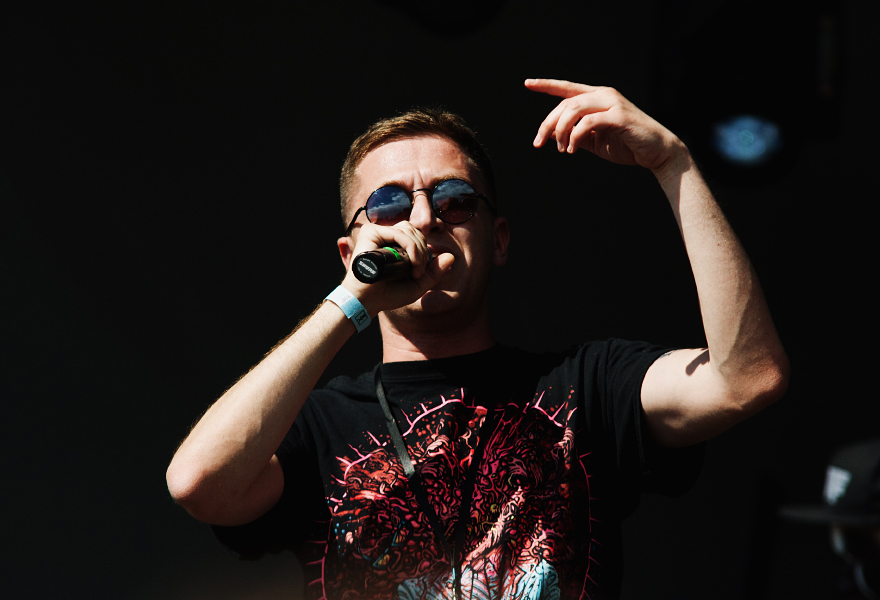
Oxxxymiron performing in Kolomenskoye, 24 July 2012

On 12 March 2012 Oxxxymiron published miXXXtape I which includes the best tracks recorded from 2008 to 2011. On 18 October 2013 miXXXtape II: Long way home (Russian: miXXXtape II: Долгий путь домой) was published. It included the best tracks of 2012-2013 and remixed Oxxxymiron's bars from his battle against Krip-a-Krip in Versus Battle league.

=== Londongrad Single (2015–2016) ===
On 25 August 2015 the music video Londongrad (Russian: Лондонград) was published as a teaser trailer for TV series Londongrad based on Miron's life in London before restarting his rapper career.

On 28 June 2016 Oxxxymiron became the first ambassador of Reebok Classic in Russia.

=== 2017–present ===
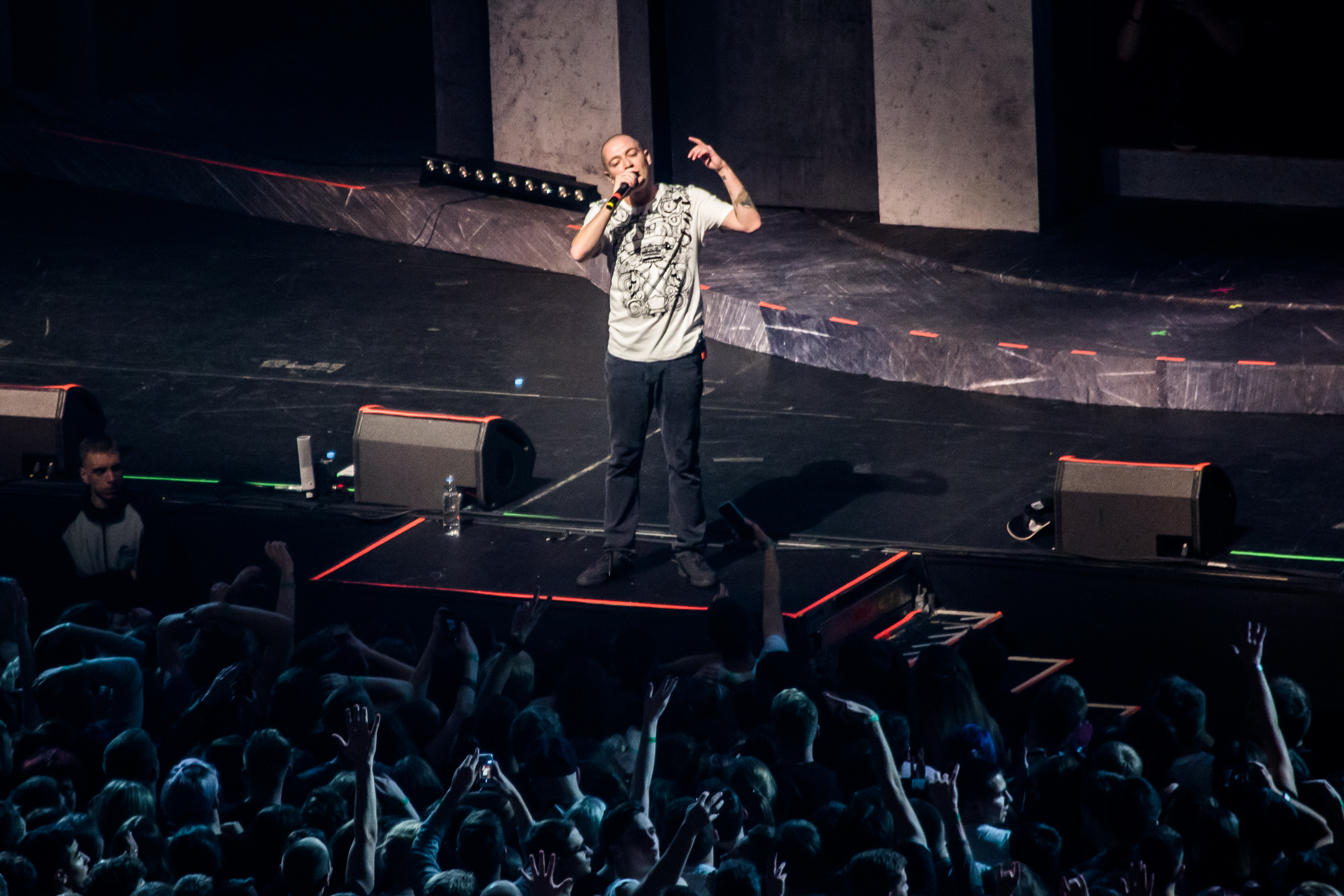
Oxxxymiron's concert in the Ice Palace of St. Petersburg, 28 October 2017

On 28 September 2017 it was announced that Oxxxymiron will star in the film adaptation of Victor Pelevin’s novel Empire V. The film's director is Victor Ginzburg, famous for the screen version of the novel Generation "П".

In September 2019, Oxxxymiron unexpectedly took part in the 17th Independent Battle on Hip-Hop.ru and passed the track for the first qualifying round. After that, a certain wave of excitement began around the event, and many famous hip-hop artists also participated (Egor Kreed, Noize MC, L'One, ST1M, Yury Khovansky, etc.).

On 1 November 2021 Oxxxymiron published a ten-minute-long music video Who killed Mark?. On 12 November Fyodorov's third mixtape, miXXXtape III: Time of Troubles, was released. It included 36 songs from 2014 to 2021 and two new tracks among them. The nine-minute single Who killed Mark?, which preceded the release of the mixtape, was not included in the playlist of the record.

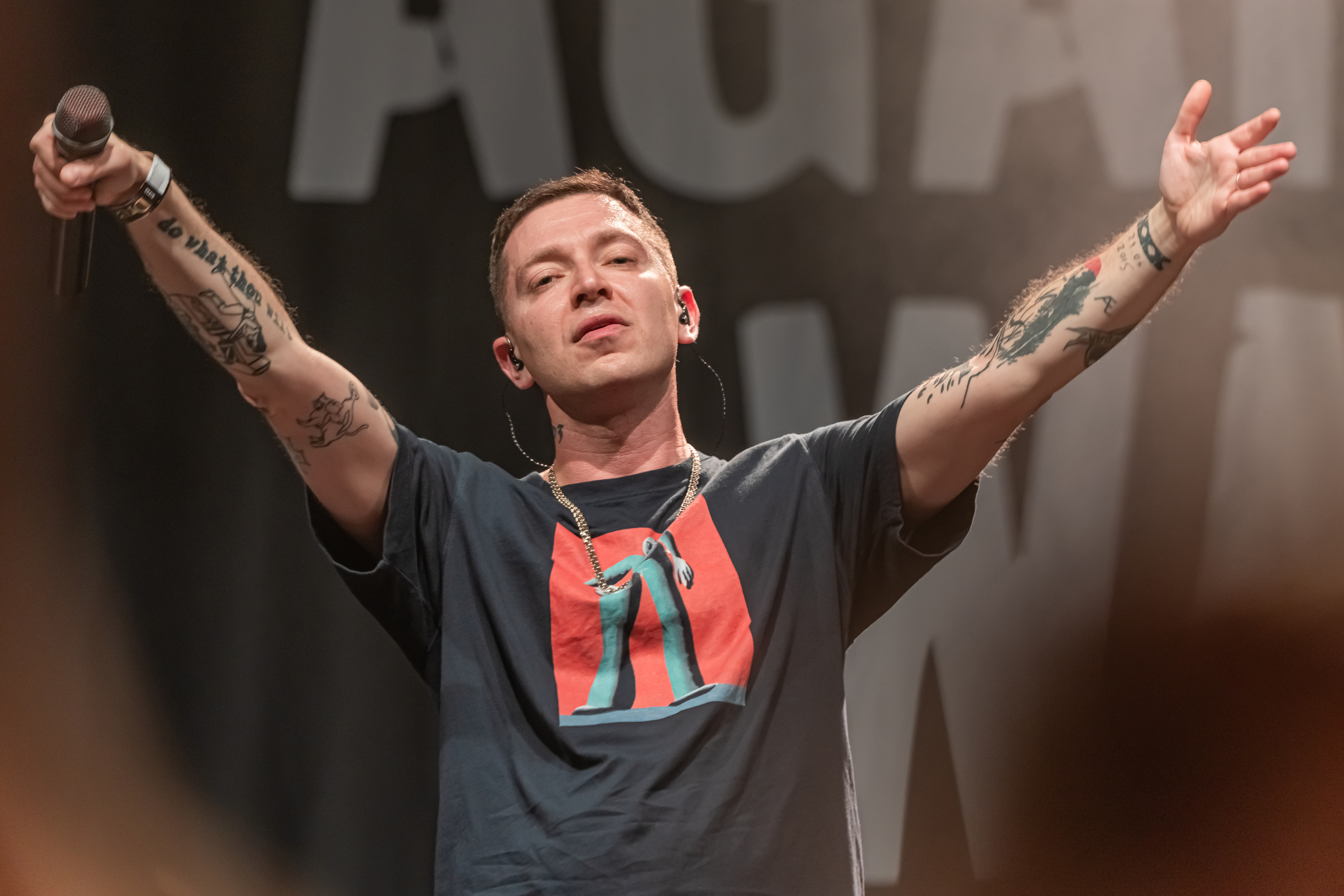
Oxxxymiron during RAW Berlin, April 2022

In reaction to the 2022 Russian invasion of Ukraine, Oxxxymiron called for an anti-war movement, stating, "I know that most people in Russia are against this war, and I am confident that the more people would talk about their real attitude to it, the faster we can stop this horror." He cancelled six sold-out concerts in Moscow and St. Petersburg, stating, "I cannot entertain you when Russian missiles are falling on Ukraine. When residents of Kyiv are forced to hide in basements and in the metro, while people are dying." He later said that it was impossible to hold an anti-war concert in Russia because "total censorship has been implemented, and anyone who speaks out against the war in any way becomes a potential target for criminal prosecution." He went on to announce a series of benefit concerts in other countries, entitled "Russians Against War", the proceeds from which would be donated to NGOs helping Ukrainian refugees. The first of these concerts was held in Istanbul, which has a large Russian diaspora consisting of people who left the country in protest of the invasion. In September, he returned to Russia; the next month, the Russian justice ministry added him to the list of foreign agents..

On 4 March 2025, the independent studio "Libo/Libo" released an investigation by Nastya Krasilnikova titled "Creative method". It published the accounts of three women (Vera Markovich, Viktoria Kuchak, and Viktoria Mikhailova), each of whom accused Oxxxymiron of grooming when they were underage. Two of them (Markovich and Kuchak) also accused him of sexual abuse of minors. On 6 March 2025, one of the women submitted a formal complaint to the Investigative Committee of Russia.

=== Battle rap ===
Oxxxymiron is the 7th most viewed battle rapper in the world. Amount of views of his rap battles exceed 120 million on YouTube.

Oxxxymiron participated in the Russian battle rap league Versus Battle five times and won the first four of them.

- 2013 – Oxxxymiron vs. Krip-a-Krip (3:0)
- 2014 – Oxxxymiron vs. Dunya (won by vote of crowd)
- 2015 – Oxxxymiron vs. Johnyboy (5:0). This battle was watched 1 million times during one day and became the most popular battle in the world. Oxxxymiron and Versus Battle league attracted the King of the Dot host Organik's and Dizaster's attention.
- 2016 – Oxxxymiron vs. ST (3:0). This battle was watched 4 million times during one day.
- 2017 – Oxxxymiron vs. Slava KPSS (Versus Battle x #SLOVOSPB) (0:5). This battle was watched over 9 million times during the first day and has become one of the most watched battles in the world.

Also Oxxxymiron performed at the Canadian rap battle league King of the Dot:

- 2017 – Oxxxymiron vs. Dizaster is scheduled as a Main Event for King of the Dot's World Domination 7 event (without judges). This battle became highest viewed on YouTube channel King of the Dot. Oxxxymiron after the battle with Dizaster thanked Slava KPSS for an opportunity to work on the mistakes. According to him, if not for that rap-battle in August, there would not have been such a historical rap-battle in October against Dizaster.

== Discography ==
=== Albums ===
- 2011 – The Wandering Jew (Вечный жид)
- 2015 – Gorgorod (Горгород)
- 2021 – Beauty & Ugliness (Красота и Уродство)
- 2025 – Nationality: None (Национальность: нет)

=== Mixtapes ===
- 2012 – miXXXtape I
- 2013 – miXXXtape II: A Long Way Home (miXXXtape II: Долгий путь домой)
- 2021 – miXXXtape III: Time of Troubles (miXXXtape III: Смутное время)

=== Singles ===
- 2011 – Feast Today and Fast Tomorrow feat. Schokk (То густо, то пусто)
- 2011 – East Mordor (Восточный Мордор)
- 2011 – Hello from the Bottom feat. dom!No (Привет со дна)
- 2011 – My Mentality (Мой менталитет)
- 2011 – Russky Cockney
- 2012 – Roly-poly Toy (Неваляшка)
- 2012 – Ultima Thule feat. Luperkal
- 2013 – Darkside feat. Madchild
- 2015 – HPL
- 2015 – Londongrad (Лондонград)
- 2015 – City under Sole (Город под подошвой)
- 2017 – Bipolar (Биполярочка)
- 2018 – Konstrukt feat. Porchy, May Wave$, Jeembo, Loqiemean, Thomas Mraz, Tveth, Souloud, Markul
- 2019 – In the rain feat. Djino
- 2019 – Reality feat. Piem, J.Makonnen, Dinast, LeTai, Palmdropov
- 2021 – Who killed Mark? (Кто убил Марка?)
- 2022 – Oyda (Ойда)
- 2022 – Made in Russia (Сделано в России)
- 2023 – The Dangerous Internet League (Лига Опасного Интернета)
- 2024 – The world is burning (Мир горит)

=== Singles (as a guest artist) ===
- 2014 – Earth Burns (Porchy feat. Oxxxymiron)
- 2014 – I'm Bored with Life (LSP feat. Oxxxymiron) (Мне скучно жить)
- 2015 – Breathless (Jacques Anthony feat. Oxxxymiron) (Бездыханным)
- 2017 – Fata Morgana (Markul feat. Oxxxymiron)
- 2018 – Gorsvet (Loqiemean feat. Oxxxymiron) (Горсвет)
- 2018 – Stereocoma (Thomas Mraz feat. Oxxxymiron)
- 2018 – Tabasco (Porchy feat. Oxxxymiron)
- 2021 – A tale of lost time (Rudeboi's single) (Сказка о потерянном времени)

=== Guest appearance ===
- 2008 – Rudeboi Mixtape (Ganz's mixtape)
- 2008 – II level\Download or die (Dandy's mixtape) (II уровень\Скачай или умри)
- 2008 – 4 My Dogs Mixtape (Ar-Side's mixtape)
- 2008 – Gemischte Tüte (Twi$terBeats' album)
- 2009 – Mixtape King Vol. 2 (SD's mixtape)
- 2009 – New Beef on the Block (Schokk's mixtape)
- 2009 – Emancipation EP (Jahna Sebastian's EP)
- 2010 – Chronicles of London (Tribe's mixtape) (Хроники Лондона)
- 2010 – Schizzo (Schokk's mixtape)
- 2011 – Retrospective (Grozny's album)
- 2011 – Operation Payback (Schokk's mini tape)
- 2011 – From the Big Road (Schokk's album) (С большой дороги)
- 2011 – Weighted Rap (Markul's mixtape)
- 2013 – Brooklyn Dubz (I1's mini tape)
- 2015 – On Real Events (Rigos' & Bluntcath's album) (На реальных событиях)
- 2015 – Magic City (LSP's album)
- 2015 – Breathless (Jacques Anthony's album) (Бездыханным)
- 2016 – King Midas (Porchy's mixtape)
- 2016 – My Little Dead Boy (Loqiemean's album)
- 2017 – Horizon of Events (Bi-2's album) (Горизонт событий)
- 2017 – Terrarium (Ka-tet's EP) (Террариум)
- 2019 – The Fall (Porchy's album)
- 2019 – Mongolia (Gino's album)
- 2020 – Tales from the Crypt (25/17's album) (Байки из склепа)
- 2021 – Aghori (Kool Savas's album)

=== Music videos ===
- 2008 – I'm a Hater (Я хейтер)
- 2011 – Feast Today and Fast Tomorrow feat. Schokk (То густо, то пусто)
- 2011 – Russky Cockney
- 2011 – Still Water feat. Markul (В тихом омуте)
- 2012 – Gremlin's Little Song (Песенка Гремлина)
- 2012 – Lie Detector (Детектор лжи)
- 2012 – Otherworldly (Не от мира сего)
- 2012 – Life Signs (Признаки жизни)
- 2013 – XXX Shop feat. Chronz, Porchy
- 2013 – Bigger Ben feat. OHRA (Больше Бена)
- 2013 – Chitinous Carapace (Хитиновый покров)
- 2013 – Drake Passage (Пролив Дрейка)
- 2013 – Honestly (I1 feat. Oxxxymiron) (Честно)
- 2015 – Deja vu (Rigos feat. Oxxxymiron) (Дежавю)
- 2015 – Roly-poly toy, unpublished video filmed in 2012 (Неваляшка)
- 2015 – Madness (LSP feat. Oxxxymiron) (Безумие)
- 2015 – Londongrad (Лондонград)
- 2015 – City under Sole (Город под подошвой)
- 2017 – IMPERIVM
- 2017 – Fata Morgana (Markul feat. Oxxxymiron)
- 2017 – Time to Go Home (Bi-2 feat. Oxxxymiron) (Пора возвращаться домой)
- 2017 – Progress Engine (Ka-tet feat. Oxxxymiron) (Машина прогресса)
- 2018 – Breathless, unpublished video filmed in 2015 (Jacques Anthony feat. Oxxxymiron) (Бездыханным)
- 2018 – Konstrukt feat. Porchy, May Wave$, Jeembo, Loqiemean, Thomas Mraz, Tveth, Souloud, Markul
- 2019 – Reality feat. Piem, J.Makonnen, Dinast, LeTai, Palmdropov
- 2021 – Verses on the Unknown Soldier, a hip-hop adaptation of Osip Mandelstam's poem of the same title (Стихи о неизвестном солдате)
- 2021 – Who killed Mark? (Кто убил Марка?)
- 2021 – Tsunami (Цунами)
- 2021 – Organization (Организация)
- 2021 – Moss (Мох)
- 2022 – Oyda (Ойда)
- 2023 – The Dangerous Internet League (Лига Опасного Интернета)

== Filmography ==
Year	Title	Original title	Role
2019	BEEF: Russian hip-hop	Russian: BEEF: Русский хип-хоп	Cameo
2022	Tchaikovsky's Wife	Russian: Жена Чайковского	Nikolai Rubinstein
2023	Empire V	Russian: Ампир V	Mitra

== Concert tours ==
- 2009 – Unnamed feat. Schokk
- 2010 – October Events feat. Schokk (Октябрьские события)
- 2011 – Vagabund Tour feat. Schokk
- 2012 – Unnamed
- 2013 – Roly-poly toy VS Mordor (Неваляшка VS Мордор Tour)
- 2013 – Long Way Home (Долгий путь домой)
- 2014 – arXXXeology (арХХХеология Tour)
- 2015 – City under Sole (Город под подошвой Tour)
- 2016 – Takeover Tour
- 2016 – Back to Europe
- 2016 – Takeover Tour 2
- 2017 – IMPERIVM (stadium tour)
- 2022 – Russians Against War
- 2023 - WORLD TOUR

== Book editions ==
- Караулов, Игорь (15 May 2022). Трудный возраст века (in Russian). Litres. ISBN 978-5-04-275970-3.
