= The Wandering Jew (album) =

Studio album by Oxxxymiron
- Released: 15 September 2011
- Genre: Hip-hop, hardcore hip-hop, grime
- Length: 41:23
- Language: Russian
- Label: Vagabund

Oxxxymiron chronology
The Wandering Jew (2011)	miXXXtape I (2012)

The Wandering Jew is the debut studio album by Russian rap artist Oxxxymiron, released in 2011. It is designed in the hip-hop genre, but tracks such as "Vostochny Mordor" and "Russky Cockney" are called the first full-fledged grime compositions in Russian. It was recorded in its entirety by British singer-songwriter and record producer Jahna Sebastian at her Multivizion Music studio in London, where she helped Oxxxymiron record and mix tracks for many years. Jahna Sebastian also sings on the track "Russky Cockney". The track "In the Shit", originally released in 2008, was completely re-recorded specifically for the album. The album took first place in the list of "Albums of the Year: Russian version" on the website Rap.ru.

== History ==
In the summer of 2010, after leaving Optik Russia, Miron developed and nurtured the idea of creating a new independent label with the symbolic name Vagabund (from Latin "vagabundo" — wanderer). By the fall of 2011, Oxxxymiron, Schokk and Vanya Lenin (as a manager) created a label under which the albums "From the Big Road" by Schokk and" Eternal Jew " by Oxxxymiron were released, which received a large number of positive reviews. Oxxxymiron recorded the album in the studio of Jahna Sebastian after many years of collaboration.

== Track listing ==
All lyrics are written by Oxxxymiron, except for tracks 6 - Oxxxymiron and Domino, 14 - Oxxxymiron and Shokk.

No.	Title	Producer	Length
1.	"Восточный Мордор"	Runaway	2:48
2.	"Тентакли"	Parliament Music	3:40
3.	"Спонтанное самовозгорание"	Parliament Music	2:31
4.	"CCTV"	Santo	2:16
5.	"До сих пор МС"	LO	3:23
6.	"Привет со дна" (feat. domiNo)	Romaniac Beatz	5:04
7.	"Вечный жид"	Entrank	2:32
8.	"В бульбуляторе"	Kaspa Hauser	2:46
9.	"Судьба моралиста"	Simple	1:52
10.	"Цифры и цвета"	Fid Mella	2:40
11.	"Russky Cockney" (add. vocal Jahna Sebastian)	Arschtritt Lindgren	2:39
12.	"В говне"	Parliament Music	2:29
13.	"Крокодиловы слёзы"	Slim	2:40
14.	"Жук в муравейнике" (feat. Schokk)	butwho?	4:00
