= Markul =

Latvian-Russian singer (born 1993)

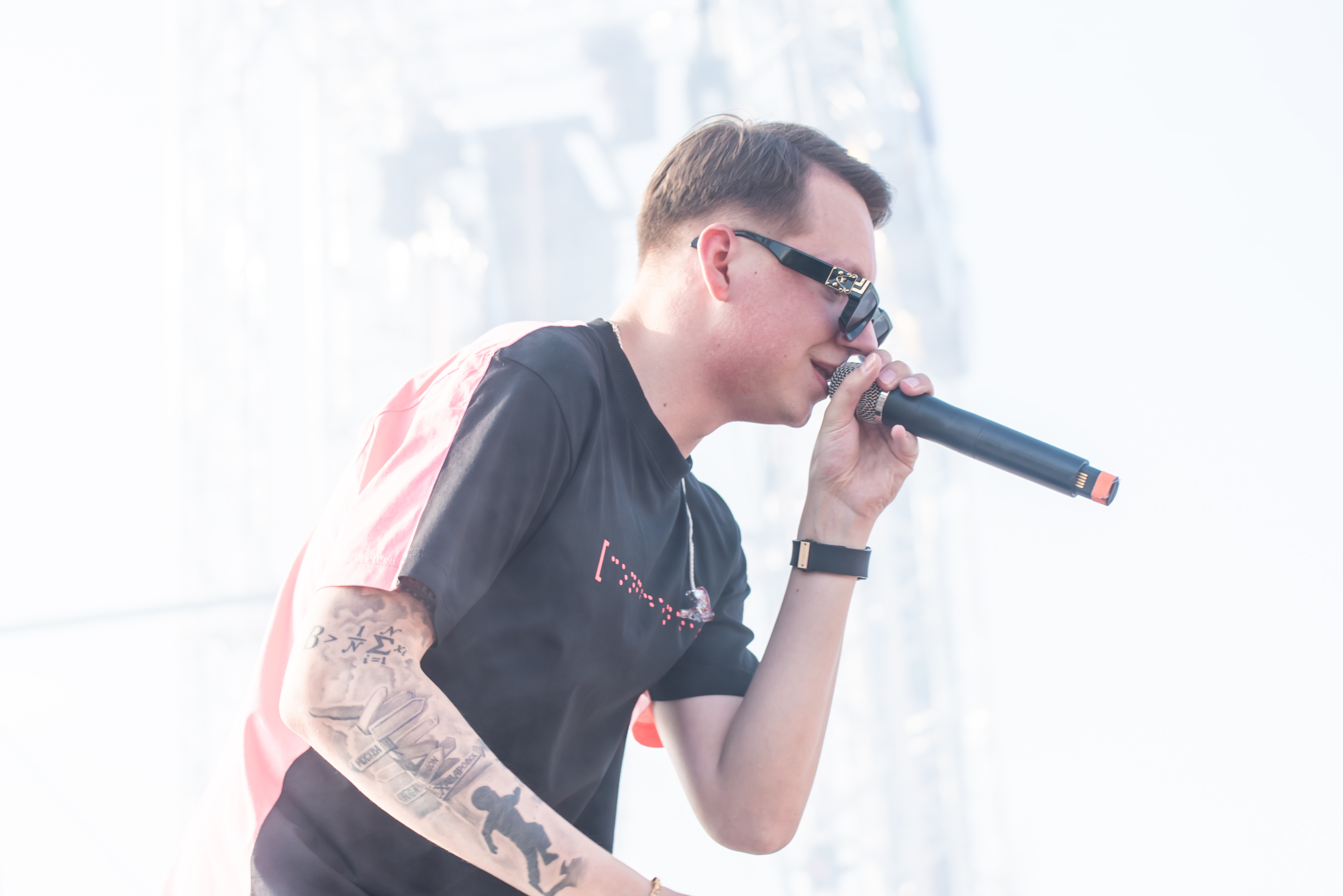
- Markul performing at a show

Background information
- Also known as: Markul
- Born: Mārkas Markūlis; March 31, 1993 (age 33); Riga, Latvia
- Genres: Pop; Hip hop; Trap; R&B; Drill
- Occupations: Singer; rapper
- Years active: 2008–present
- Formerly of: Tribe

Mārkas Markūlis (Russian: Маркас (Марк) Вадимович Марку́лис, romanized: Markas (Mark) Vadimovich Markulis; born 31 March 1993), better known by his stage name Markul (Russian: Марку́л), is a Russian hip-hop artist who creates deep, atmospheric music with melancholic lyrics that combine elements of hip-hop and modern urban music. His key albums, such as Great Depression (2018), Sense of Human (2021), and MAKE DEPRESSION GREAT AGAIN (2024), reflect his unique musical style and worldview.

== Biography and music career ==
=== Single «Fata Morgana» — present time ===
On 21 September 2017 Markul released a music video for the single Fata Morgana featuring Oxxxymiron. For Mark, this work brought him wider fame among Russian listeners. For Мiron, it was his first musical piece after losing to Slava KPSS on the second crossover «Versus Battle x #SLOVOSPB». On 1 December 2017 Markul released with Obladaet a 6-track mini-album called Friends & Family. At the end of the year it was confirmed that Mark joined the concert agency «Booking Machine», which was headed by his friend Oxxxymiron.

On 19 April 2019 Mark released the single «Больше бед».

On 26 July 2019 Mark released the single «Скалы».

On 15 November 2019 he released the single «B.I.D» for the tour «Before I Disappear».

On 6 March 2020 it was confirmed, that Markul was no longer going to be part of the concert agency «Booking Machine». On 10 July 2020 he released 3 singles: the solo singles «2 минуты», «Phantom» & with Платинa, «конфеты».

On 11 December he released the track «тренировочный день» with Куок.

In Winter 2021 the artist announced the release of his third studio album S.O.H..

On 5 August 2022 he released, with Tosya Chaikina, the song «Стрелы».

On 12 August 2022 Markul released the song «Больно» with Aarne and MAYOT.

On 2 December 2022 he released the single «НИОТКУДА».

== Discography ==
=== Studio albums ===
Title	Details	Highest position on charts
Title	Details	(Lithuania) Lithuania AGATA
Tranzit	Released: 16 March 2017; Label: FRWRD Music; Format: Digital, streaming	×
Great Depression	Release: 16 October 2018; Label: FRWRD Music; Format: Digital streaming	—
Sense of Human	Released: 15 October 2021; Label: FRWRD Music; Format: Digital streaming	45
Symbol «—» means the album did not chart; the «×» symbol indicates the chart was inactive.

=== Mini albums ===
Year	Mini-album
2015	«Сухим из воды»
2017	Friends & Family (with Obladaet)

=== Mixtapes ===
Year	Mixtape
2011	«Взвешенный рэп»

=== Collaborations ===
Year	Mixtape
2010	«Хроники Лондона» (with the Tribe group)

=== Singles ===
Year	Single
2012	«Игра с огнём»
2014	«Сухим из воды»
2015	«Мало добра»
2015	«Прорвёмся»
2015	«Slipknot»
2016	«Спрут»
2016	«Крэк 1»
2016	«Flexin» (feat. Porchy, Jerome da Chef)
2016	«Последний билет» (feat. Obladaet)
2017	«Russky Rodman» (with Mufesah)
2017	«Moulin Rouge»
2017	«Подарок» (feat. Obladaet)
2017	«Не зря»
2017	«Fata Morgana» (feat. Oxxxymiron)
2017	«Wo Wo Wo (Krept & Konan Challenge)» (feat. Sifo)
2018	«Атлантида»
2018	«Blues»
2018	«Корабли в бутылках»
2018	«Худший друг»
2019	«Больше бед»
2019	«Серпантин»
2019	«Скалы»
2019	«B.I.D»
2020	«Конфеты» (feat. Платины)
2020	«2 минуты»
2020	«Phantom»
2020	«Тренировочный День» (feat. Куока)
2021	«Бумеранг»
2021	«Вредные привычки»
2021	«Zima Blue»
2021	«Syrena»
2022	«Конечная Станция»
2022	«Стрелы» (feat. Тоси Чайкиной)
2022	«НИОТКУДА»

=== Released with other singers ===
Year	Artist	Music release	Track
2016	Loqiemean	My Little Dead Boy	«Burroughs» (with Slippah Ne Spi, Nds Flava)
2016	Damany	«Радары»	
2017	Yanix	«Шоу улиц гетто 2.5»	«Флоу» (with Face)
2017	Obladaet	Files	«Files»
2017	Idan	«Плот моего воображения»	«Не всем. Londmix» (feat. MC No Limit, D.Loyal, Roman Troy)
2018	Idan	«Плот моего воображения 2: Вакуум»	«Как будто тут»
2018	Разные исполнители	«Konstrukt» (with Porchy, May Wave$, Jeembo, Loqiemean, Thomas Mraz, Tveth, Souloud, Oxxxymiron)	
2018	Thomas Mraz	«9 Воскресений»	«Sangria»
2019	Porchy	The Fall	«Struggles» (with. Idan, Oxxxymiron)
2019	Билик	X-Ray	«X-Ray»
2019	Hash Tag	«Артист!»	«HEY YA»
2019	Хайд	«Нерв»	«Право на подвиг»
2021	Джарахов	«Я в моменте»	«Я в моменте»
2022	Aarne	Aa Language	«Noir» (with The Limba)
2022	Aarne	Aa Language	«Больно» (feat. Mayot)

== Videography ==
=== Videoclips ===
Year	Title	Album	Director
2011	«В тихом омуте» (feat. Oxxxymiron)	Взвешенный рэп	Неизвестно
2011	«Другой маршрут»	Взвешенный рэп	
2011	«Всё ближе» (feat. Den Bro)		
2014	«Сухим из воды»	Сухим из воды	Crystal Vision
2015	«Мало добра»	Сухим из воды	Supfly
2015	«Прорвёмся»	Сухим из воды	Crystal Vision
2016	«Спрут»	Tranzit	Crystal Vision
2016	«Крек 1»	Tranzit	Crystal Vision
2016	«Flexin» (with Porchy, Jerome Da Chef)	Внеальбомный	Crystal Vision
2016	«Последний билет» (with Obladaet)	Tranzit	Kosmodrome/Crystal Vision
2017	«Moulin Rouge»	Tranzit	Crystal Vision
2017	«Леброн»	Tranzit	Crystal Vision
2017	«Fata Morgana» (with Oxxxymiron)	Внеальбомный	Lado Kvataniya
2017	«Wo Wo Wo (Krept & Koran Challenge)» (feat. Sifo)	Внеальбомный	Adetue
2018	«Корабли в бутылках»	Внеальбомный	Mariya Makovskaya
2018	«Blues»	Great Depression	Elder Garayev
2018	«Без тебя»	Great Depression	ROHO
2019	«Серпантин»	Great Depression	Elder Garayev
2019	«Скалы»	Внеальбомный	ROHO
2019	«X-Ray» (feat. Билика)	Внеальбомный	Kosmodrome
2019	«B.I.D»	Внеальбомный	Crystal Vision / Markul
2021	«Бумеранг»	Sense Of Human	Elder Garayev
2021	«Syrena»	Sense Of Human	Aleksandra Sakharnaya

=== With other singers ===
Year	Title	Director
2016	«Мне плевать» (Remix) (feat. Damany)	Crystal Vision
2018	«Konstrukt» (feat. Porchy, May Wave$, Jeembo, Loqiemean, Thomas Mraz, Tveth, Souloud, Oxxxymiron)	ROHO
2021	«Я в моменте» (feat. Джарахов)	Alina Pasok

== Concert tours ==
Year	Concert Tour
2017	Tranzit Tour
2018	Low Life Tour
2018	Great Depression Tour
2019	Compass Tour
2019	Before I Disappear Tour
2021	Pressure Tour
