= Ercandize =

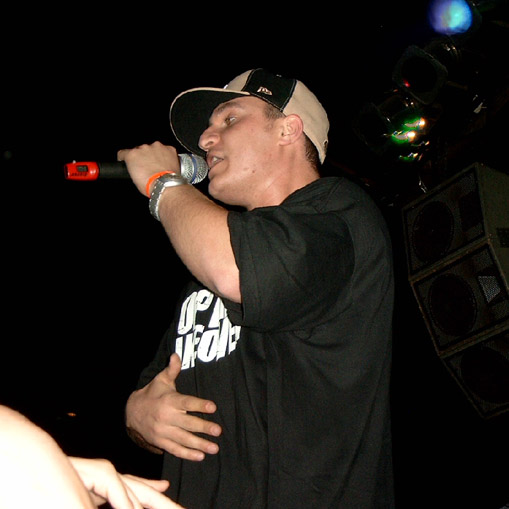
- Ercandize in Dortmund in 2005

Background information
- Born: Ercan Kocer; April 12, 1978 (age 48)
- Origin: Wesel, Germany
- Genre: German hip hop
- Years active: 1993—2012
- Label: Optik Records
- Formerly of: ABS
- Website: www.ercandize.de

Ercan Kocer (born April 12, 1978), better known as Ercandize is a German rapper of Turkish ancestry and a certificated economist. He is signed on Kool Savas' label Optik Records.

Ercandize grew up in Wesel. In his youth, he wrote graffiti until he started the rap crew ABS with Sedat and Daiker around 1993. Producer Discopolo, DJ Salicious and MC Short joined later. In 1999, ABS released their first single, "08-15/Focus", which was chosen as 12" of the month by the German hip hop magazine Juice and in mid-99, the first record contract was signed. Features with well-known German artists like Plattenpapzt, Too Strong, RAG and Roey Marquis as well as two more singles followed until ABS' debut album Kinderspiel - Leichter getan als gesagt was published. Beyond expectation, it reached #46 on the German charts.

ABS went on hiatus, and due to several differences, Ercandize parted from his label BMG.

Kool Savas took notice of Ercandize's talent through a feature on an album by Illmatic and invited Ercandize to Berlin to record some tracks. Consequently, Ercandize was signed to Optik Records and his first solo album Verbrannte Erde was released in April 2007. He also founded his own label Assazeen.

Ercandize has studied economics at the Ruhr University in Bochum. He got his diploma in 2006.

== Discography ==
=== Albums ===
- 2001 - Kinderspiel - Leichter getan als gesagt (as ABS; German charts: #46)
- 2006 - Optik Takeover (with Kool Savas & Optik Army; #8))
- 2007 - Verbrannte Erde (#71)
- 2012 - Uppercut

=== EPs ===
- 2004 - "Willkommen im Dschungel"

=== Mixtapes ===
- 2004 - Best Of Ercandize Vol. 1
- 2004 - Ear 2 The Street (with DJ Katch)
- 2005 - Ear 2 The Street Vol.2 (with DJ Katch)
- 2006 - La Haine - Sie Nannten Ihn Mücke

=== Singles ===
- 1999 - "08-15/Focus" (as ABS)
- 2000 - "Mathematik/Klarkomm'" (as ABS)
- 2000 - "Weisst Du…?" (as ABS; with Creutzfeldt & Jakob, Dike & OnAnOn)
- 2006 - "Das ist OR" (with Kool Savas & Optik Army; #28)
- 2006 - "Komm mit mir" (with Kool Savas; #26)
- 2007 - "Verbrannte Erde"

=== Other ===
- 2006 - "Lava-Rhymes" (Juice exclusive [CD #63])
- 2006 - "Komplett Geboxt" (with Separate; Juice exclusive [CD #65])
- 2007 - "Represent" (Juice Exclusive [CD #72])
- 2007 - "Im Studio" (with Lakmann - hiphop.de exclusive)
- 2007 - "Wer ist es" (with Kool Savas and Lakman - optikrecords.de)
- 2007 - "Was Ich Habe" (with Lakmann - rap.de exclusive)
- 2007 - "Nie Mehr" (with Kool Savas & Caput - 77store.com exclusive)
