= Morgan the Pirate (song) =

1966 song by Richard Fariña

"Morgan the Pirate" is a song by Richard Fariña, written in 1966 and released on the 1968 Richard and Mimi Fariña album Memories (Mimi being Richard's wife, and vocalist on the song). Richard Fariña was dead by the time the song and album were released.

The song has been believed by Fariña's producer, and others, be an answer song to Bob Dylan's 1965 song "Positively 4th Street", a scathing putdown of which various people have been mooted as the target, including Fariña (Fariña's wife and Dylan's one-time lover Joan Baez were sisters, and the four had become close friends, although Fariña and Dylan were also rivals).

"Morgan the Pirate" itself is acerbic, and in places sarcastic:

It's bye bye buddy have to say it once again
I appreciate your velvet helping hand
Even though you never gave it I am sure you had to save it
For the gestures of the friends you understand
Now you've gotten even higher
And become your own supplier
And the number one denier of the one or two hard feelings
One or two hard feelings
One or two hard feelings left behind

— Richard Fariña, "Morgan the Pirate" (excerpt)

That Dylan was targeting Fariña in "Positively 4th Street" is not provable, and other people have been suggested, or no one single person. Nor is it provable that "Morgan the Pirate" is about Dylan. Fariña's producer Maynard Solomon apparently thought so, as his liner notes for the album noted that "Morgan the Pirate" was Richard Fariña's last song and "waves farewell to Bob Dylan". Tony Attwood also thought so, as did William Lawlor and Robert Christgau. Spencer Leigh also suggested it, although he didn't take a definite position.

The lyrics have nothing at all to do with the real "Morgan the Pirate", Henry Morgan. The reason Fariña chose that title is unknown. The song was also included on the Richard and Mimi Fariña compilation albums Pack Up Your Sorrows: Best Of The Vanguard Years and Vanguard Visionaries: Mimi & Richard Fariña. Iain Matthews recorded a cover version for his 1971 album If You Saw Thro' My Eyes, and Caroline Doctorow released her cover version on her 2008 album Another Country.
