= Das Urteil (song) =

Single by Kool Savas
- Released: 2005
- Genre: Hip hop
- Label: Optik Records
- Songwriter(s): Kool Savas

Kool Savas singles chronology
"Das Urteil" (2005)	"Monstershit" (2005)

"Das Urteil" (German for The judgment or The verdict) is a diss track by German rapper Kool Savas, against his former partner Eko Fresh. The diss was a response to Eko Fresh's track "Die Abrechnung". The track was offered as a free download on the website MZEE.com and downloaded 100,000 times, becoming the best known diss track in Germany.

== Background ==
Kool Savas and Eko Fresh began to dispute in 2002 and Eko Fresh left Optik Records shortly after. In 2004, Eko Fresh released the diss "Die Abrechnung", where he mainly attacks Kool Savas, but also criticises his former labelmates and other rappers. In the verse concerned with Kool Savas, Eko Fresh accuses his former colleague of being jealous of his fame.

== Style ==
A notable feature of the song is that it has no chorus and instead has only one verse that lasts five minutes, which Kool Savas found exhausting to rap. Combined with his willingness to drop the feud, this meant he avoided performing the song on stage.

Kool Savas performed the song on MTV TRL.

== Music video ==
The video features an Eko Fresh lookalike. It starts with Eko Fresh walking in a forest where he discovers a grave which carries the dates of his career's beginning and end. He runs through the forest trying to escape but crosses Kool Savas' way, who drives a Chrysler 300 C. Kool Savas gets out of his car and forces Eko Fresh into the trunk. In the next shot Eko Fresh is crawling on all four with a chain around his neck. Savas leads him back to the grave field and makes a dismayed Eko Fresh dig his own grave. Once finished, Eko Fresh is forced into a coffin and buried alive.
