= Jacques Anthony =

Russian rapper (born 1992)

Jacques-Anthony Жак-Энтони
- Also known as: Dxn Bnlvdn; Flame Tony; J-Anthony
- Born: Jacques Menshikov; 31 January 1992 (age 34); Vologda, Russia
- Genres: Hip-hop
- Occupations: Rapper; songwriter
- Instruments: Vocals; piano; guitar
- Label: Reigun Records

Jacques Anthony Menshikov (Russian: Жак Энтони Меньшиков), better known by his stage names Jacques-Anthony (Жак-Энтони) or DXN BNLVDN, is a Russian rapper and songwriter from St. Petersburg. He has done collaborations with many popular artists including Oxxxymiron and Smoky Mo, and some of his works have been featured in movies, such as his release of "Our District", which was featured in the movie "Attraction". He has currently released six albums and over seventy-six songs.

== Early life ==
Jacques was born on 21 January 1993, in Vologda, Russia to Simona Makanda and rapper Ligalize. Jacques's mother was the lead singer of a popular hip-hop group known as the D.O.B. Community and the first female rapper in Russia, and his father was a famous rapper known as Legalize and the founder of the DOB Community. Andrew married Simon four years after Jacques's birth, and the three then moved to the Congo where they lived for a few years before returning to Russia at the outbreak of the Congo Civil War. Jacques then lived with his father in Medvedkovo until his mother reunited with him at the age of 11. Initially, Jacques attended Kazarnovskii, which is a school in Moscow. It was during this time that Jacques began learning to play the piano and guitar.

In 2004, Jacques moved with his mother to the city of St. Petersburg, and his parents divorced soon afterward. In an interview, Jacques stated that at the new school he was involved with karate, alcohol, and hashish. With nowhere left to turn but his music, Jacques began writing his own raps at the age of 14.

In 2008, Jacques moved back to Africa with his mother. He got in trouble with the law though, so he was sent to live with his Aunt and Uncle elsewhere in Africa. His uncle, the CEO of an oil company, made sure that Jacques was once again attending an elite school. He soon left to study Political Science at a university in Moscow. Jacques quickly lost interest in his studies though, and he decided to join the Army. He then served in Ivanovo as a Strategic Missile Forces Specialist, until he retired at the rank of Corporal.

== Music career ==
At the start of his career, Jack used many pseudonyms, the most notable being Don Binladen, but he has since changed his name to Jacques Anthony. He then joined a record label "Reigun Records", and released some small works, but none of them got much popularity. His first breakthrough was in December 2014 with an internet video titled "Old Testament". This gained him quite a bit of attention in the rap scene. In September 2015, Jack's career exploded with his release of "Breathless", which featured popular rapper Oxxxymiron. In 2015 alone, Jack released multiple singles and two albums: #NoName and The Same Negro. He also did a collaboration in December 2015, "Director", with Smokey Mo. Jack was nominated for "Breakthrough of the Year" in 2015 by the Public NR.

In 2016, Jack released Breathless and Dorian Gray, which included a number of hit tracks such as "Fallen", "I Read With My Eyes Closed", and "Tic Tac Toe". He also released multiple singles including "Saturn" and "Like a Shark".

So far, the only single Jacques has released in 2017 has been "In Black and White".

== Song list ==
Title	Album	Year
"Whores know"	#NoName	2015
"#NoName"	#NoName	2015
"I'm no longer here"	#NoName	2015
"From the streets"	#NoName	2015
"I want heights"	#NoName	2015
"Do not know at all"	#NoName	2015
"Oceans"	#NoName	2015
"From zero to start"	#NoName	2015
"Torch"	#NoName	2015
"More than today"	#NoName	2015
"Wash"	#NoName	2015
"N.B.R."	#NoName	2015
"NPBDL"	#NoName	2015
"Lifeless"	Lifeless	2015
"21 Brother"	#NoName	2015
"All that I have"	All that I have	2016
"Our district"	Our District (From the movie "Attraction")	2016
"Do what you must"	Do What You Must	2016
"Fallen"	Dorian Gray Volume 1	2016
"Dorian Gray"	Dorian Gray Volume 1	2016
"In the bathroom"	Dorian Gray Volume 1	2016
"King for a day"	Dorian Gray Volume 1	2016
"Need more"	Dorian Gray Volume 1	2016
"Gift"	Dorian Gray Volume 1	2016
"Cartoon"	Dorian Gray Volume 1	2016
"With nothing"	Dorian Gray Volume 1	2016
"Antarctica"	Dorian Gray Volume 1	2016
"Artist (Intro)"	Dorian Gray Volume 1	2016
"Women (Skeet)"	Dorian Gray Volume 1	2016
"Dorian (Skeet)"	Dorian Gray Volume 1	2016
"For trouble"	Dorian Gray Volume 1	2016
"Know us"	Enough Questions	2014
"Church"	Enough Questions	2014
"Enough questions"	Enough Questions	2014
"Fireworks"	Fireworks	2015
"Flight"	Flight	2015
"God will not forgive"	God Will Not Forgive	2015
"In black and white"	In Black and White	2017
"Let's blow it up"	Let's Blow It Up	2016
"Like a shark"	Like a Shark	2016
"The Old Testament"	Live and Do	2014
"On the stadiums"	Live and Do	2014
"Live and do"	Live and Do	2014
"New Level"	Live and Do	2014
"Freeze"	Live and Do	2014
"On the phone"	Live and Do	2014
"Starve or act"	Live and Do	2014
"Saturn"	Saturn	2016
"Do it right"	Breathless	2016
"Constellation of the monster"	Breathless	2016
"Do as you should"	Breathless	2016
"Hell is us"	Breathless	2016
"Exhale smoke"	Breathless	2016
"My world"	Breathless	2016
"I'm rushing"	Breathless	2016
"It's not about the money"	Breathless	2016
"Hitchcock"	Breathless	2016
"I read with my eyes closed"	Breathless	2016
"Signals"	Breathless	2016
"Any other"	Breathless	2016
"With me or with them"	Breathless	2016
"Free cash"	Breathless	2016
"Too long"	Breathless	2016
"Running"	Breathless	2016
"Breathless"	Breathless	2016
"It's time to wake up"	Breathless	2016
"The same Negro"	The same Negro	2015
"There is no place"	The same Negro	2015
"Come on"	The same Negro	2015
"Tic Tac Toe"	The same Negro	2015
"The whole truth is an inspiration"	The same Negro	2015
"Up"	The same Negro	2015
"Know"	The same Negro	2015
"Total of myself"	Total of Myself	2015
"Willy Wonka"	Willy Wonka	2015
"Without money"	Without Money	2015
