= Maria Motuznaya =

Russian blogger and activist (born 1994)

- Мария Мотузная
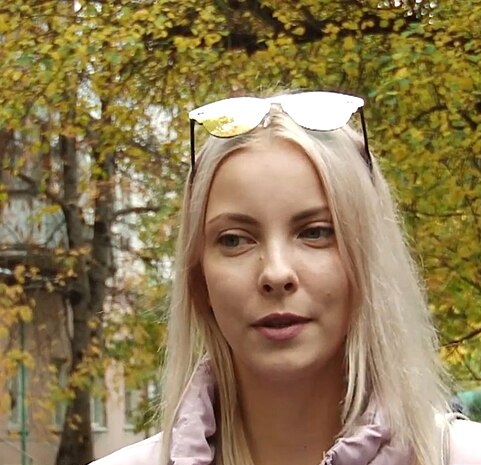
- Motuznaya in 2018
- Born: Maria Sergeyevna Motuznaya; 26 August 1994 (age 31); Barnaul, Altai Krai, Russia
- Occupation: Blogger

Maria Sergeyevna Motuznaya (Russian: Мария Сергеевна Мотузная; born August 26, 1994) is a Russian blogger and activist. She came to public attention in 2018 when she explained on Twitter why she was on Russia's official list of extremists and terrorists.

== Early life ==
Motuznaya was raised by her Orthodox Christian mother and is pursuing film direction.

In May 2018, she was jailed for sharing an offensive meme on social media. The basis for the accusation was that in 2015, she had saved pictures of memes on the themes of religion and race in her VKontakte albums.

Motuznaya believes that the real reason for her persecution is her activism. She has repeatedly published announcements of opposition rallies, including those of Alexei Navalny, on social media.

In October 2018, she announced her emigration from Russia to seek asylum in a European country. In January 2019, the case against her was discontinued.

In March 2022, Motuznaya criticized AssezJeune's reasons to remove the red stripe from the white-blue-white flag.
