= Thomas Mraz =

Russian rapper (born 1992)

- Also known as: Thomas Mraz; Thomas Mrvz
- Born: Almas Almasovich Gataullin; Алмас Алмасович Гатауллин; December 7, 1992 (age 33); Ufa, Russia
- Genres: Hip hop; Pop; R&B; Neo soul
- Years active: 2012-present

Almas Almasovich Gataullin (Russian: Алма́с Алма́сович Гатау́ллин (born 7 December 1992; Ufa, Republic of Bashkortostan, Russia), better known under the pseudonym Thomas Mraz (stylized Thomas Mrvz) (ru: То́мас Мраз) is a Russian rapper, singer, and songwriter. He is a former member of the creative associations "Dopeclvb" and "YungRussia," and a former member of the concert agency "Booking Machine."
