= Slava KPSS =

Russian hip-hop artist and streamer (born 1990)

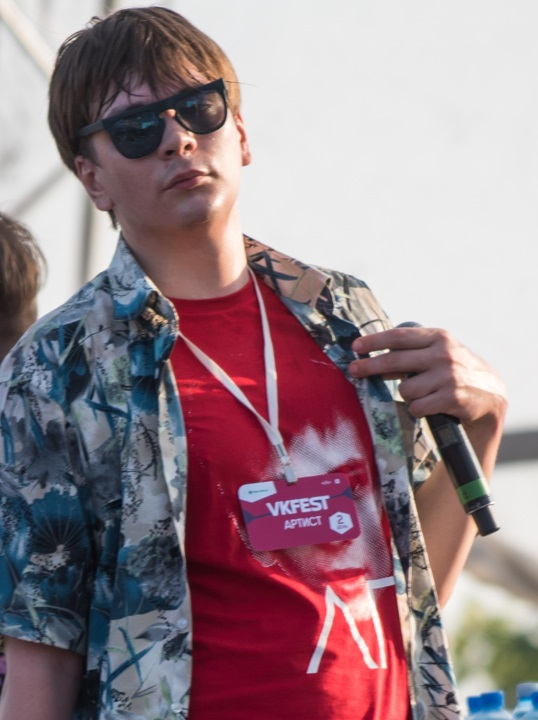

Background information
- Born: Vyacheslav Valerievich Mashnov; 9 May 1990 (age 36); Khabarovsk, Russian SFSR, Soviet Union
- Genres: Hip hop, experimental music, battle rap, mashup, chastushki
- Occupations: Rapper, songwriter, streamer, system administrator
- Years active: 2012—present
- Labels: Renessans; DNK Music; VSRAP Music

Vyacheslav Valeryevich Mashnov (Russian: Вячеслав Валерьевич Машнов; born 9 May 1990), best known by his stage name Slava KPSS (Note: See other stage names below in the §Stage names section) (Слава КПСС) is a Russian hip-hop artist and streamer.

== Biography ==
Vyacheslav was born on 9 May 1990 in Khabarovsk and studied at the Khabarovsk Institute of Infocommunications. Before the start of his musical career, Mashnov listened to rappers Noize MC, Kasta, Mnogotochie, as well as rock musicians: Yegor Letov, Boris Grebenshchikov, DDT, Zvuki Mu, Alisa, Agatha Christie and others.

In 2016, Mashnov, under the pseudonym Gnoyny, became a member of the creative rap association Antihype (which also included SD, Khan Zamai and Booker).

Attention to Vyacheslav grew after the battle against Ernesto Zatknites in July 2016, where he criticized Oxxxymiron, accusing him of hypocrisy and calling him "a hype-hungry pig". The next day, Miron Fedorov challenged Gnoyny to a battle in 2017.

The rap battle with Oxxxymiron, which became the most anticipated in Russia, took place within the 2nd season of Versus x #SlovoSPB on 6 August and was published on 13 August. Slava KPSS defeated Oxxxymiron with a score of 5:0. The video became resonant and gained about 10 million views in the first day after publication. After the battle he gave an interview to Yuri Dud for the Internet show "vDud".

== Stage names ==
- Sulla MC was the first stage name used in 2009–2010.
- Slava KPSS (Glory to the CPSU) is the main stage name. It is a wordplay, the term slava can be used as glory to, but Slava is also a shortening of the name Vyacheslav. Rapper's father came up with such stage name.
- Gnoyny (Purulent) is used for rap battles.
- Ptichiy Pepel (Bird Ash) is the alternative name for battles.
- Sonya Marmeladova is used for BPM battles and grime songs. It is a reference to the character from Fyodor Dostoevsky's novel Crime and Punishment.
- Valentin Dyadka (Uncle Valentine) is used for parody songs, mashups and chastushki.
- Buter Brodsky (Sandwich Brodsky) is used in existential gloomy compositions with balalaikas. It is a wordplay, which consists of the word buterbrod (Russian for sandwich) and Joseph Brodsky's last name.
- Vorovskaya Lapa (Thieves' Paw) is used for parodying bad recitative, mumble rap and detroit rap.
- Big Baby Prilepin is used to mock rapper Big Baby Tape and writer Zakhar Prilepin.
- Gleb Minyokhin is used for 'strictly LGBT+' songs.
- There are also several less known and rarely used pseudonyms, such as Brick Bazuka, Valentina Matvienko, Valyazhny Tonny (Russian: Вальяжный Тонни, Imposing Tonny), KPSS (Russian: КПСС, CPSU), Sirenevaya Storona Yebla Opukhshaya (Russian: Сиреневая сторона ебла опухшая, Lilac Swollen Side of the Kisser), Aval SSPK (Russian: Авал ССКП), MC Baklasan (Russian: МЦ Бакласан), Kostya Greben (Russian: Костя Гребень, Kostya the Comb), mc perez hilton (Russian: мц перец хилтон, a wordplay constisting of Russian word for pepper and Paris Hilton), MC Kucheryavy (Russian: МЦ Кучерявый, MC Curly), Leontyev Valera, Ochen' Priyatny Gremlin (Russian: Очень приятный гремлин, Very Nice Gremlin, a reference to Oxxxymiron's Gremlin's Little Song), Slava Siropchik (Russian: Слава Сиропчик, Slava the Syrup), MC Zhutkiy Rot (Russian: МЦ Жуткий рот, MC Creepy Mouth), mc calendula (Russian: мц календула), MF Deripaska (MF Doom + Oleg Deripaska), Tragediya vsey zhizhi (Russian: Трагедия всей жижи, the tragedy of slush, parody on a Russian underground rap band Tragediya vsey zhizni), MC Ashotik (Russian: МЦ Ашотик, was used for mocking Russian rapper Loc-Dog), Yelena Montana (Russian: Елена Монтана, Russian parodist Yelena Vorobey + Russian rapper Mozee Montana), Zamayskiy zhuk (Russian: Замайский жук, a wordplay consisting of Zamay who is a Russian rapper and Slava's close friend and maybug), Ministerstvo haipa (Russian: Министерство хайпа, Ministry of hype), LIL BAB, DJ Hattifnatt, Drenazhnaya voda A4 (Russian: Дренажная вода А4, A4 drainage water), Tri dnya govna (Russian: Три дня говна, Three days of shit, a parody on Russian pop rock band Tri dnya dozhdya (Russian: Три дня дождя, Three days of rain)).

== Political views ==
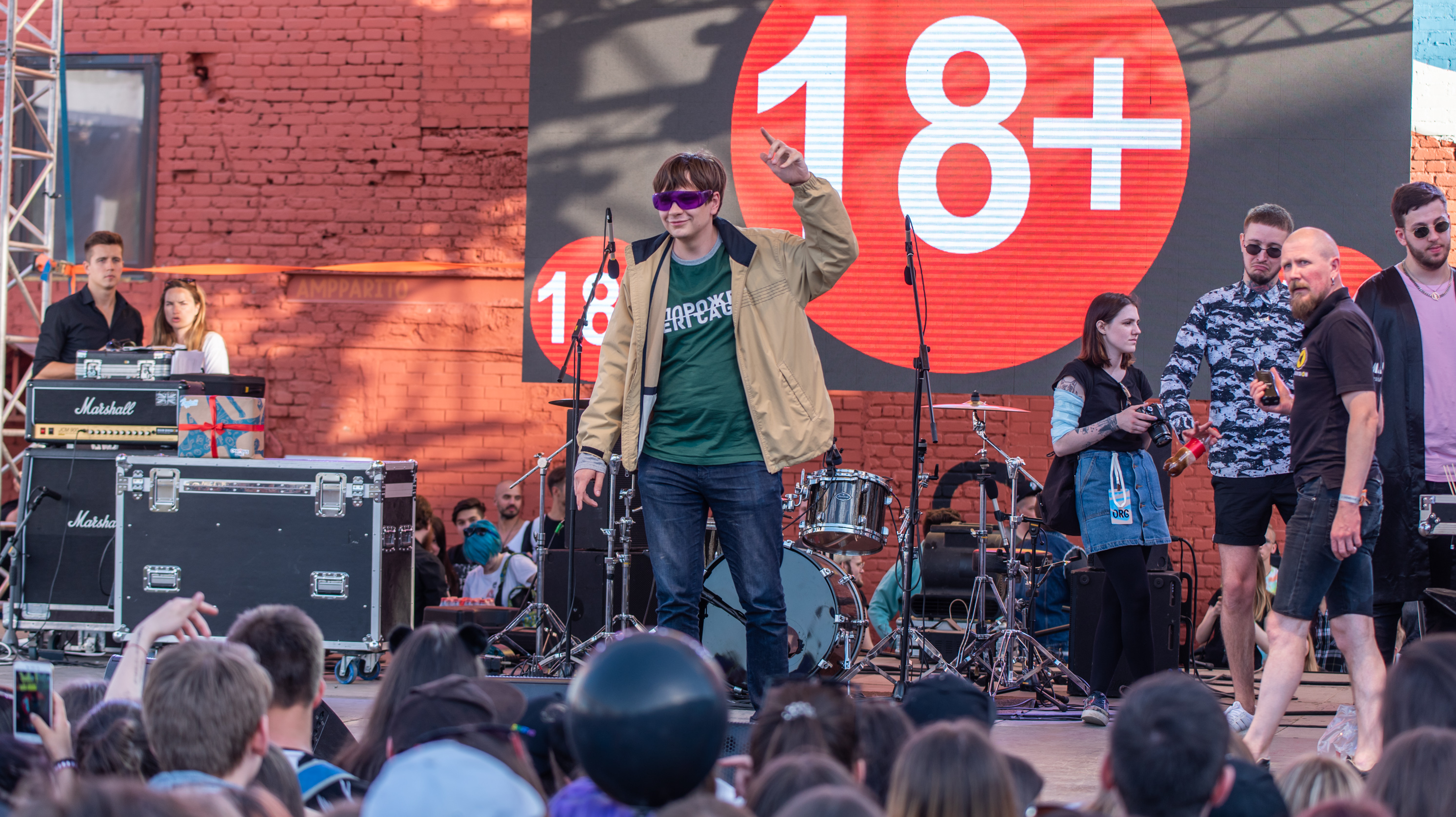
Slava KPSS performing at Vidfest 2018 in St. Petersburg

On 6 February 2021 Mashnov was arrested for participating in a rally on February 2 in St. Petersburg. He received 7 days of administrative arrest for chanting the slogan "Lick, but don't bite. The clitoris is a delicate thing!"

In an interview with Ksenia Sobchak, he stated that he is a vegetarian and adheres to left-wing political views.

In May 2021, Vyacheslav announced that he would run for the State Duma of the Russian Federation from the Green Alternative party.

== Discography ==
=== Studio albums ===
Date of Release	Pseudonym	Title	Translation
2017	Slava KPSS	Чай вдвоём	Tea for Two
2017	Slava KPSS	Солнце мёртвых	The Sun of the Dead
2018	Slava KPSS	Взрослая танцевальная музыка	Dance Music for Adults
2018	Slava KPSS	ОВЕРХАЙП	OVERHYPE
2018	Slava KPSS	ОВЕРХАЙП 2	OVERHYPE 2
2018	Slava KPSS	ОВЕРХАЙП 3	OVERHYPE 3
2020	Slava KPSS	Чудовище погубившее мир	The Monster That Ruined the World
2023	Slava KPSS	ГОРГОРОД 2	GORGOROD 2
2023	Tri dnya govna	Геометрия кала	Geometry of Shit
2023	Slava KPSS	Любимые песни настоящих людей	Favourite Songs of Real People
2023	Vorovskaya Lapa	Сияние лапы	Shining of Paw (Siyanie lapy)
2024	Valentin Dyadka	Застольные психоделические песни	Psychedelic Drinking Songs
2024	Slava KPSS	Россия34	Russia34
2024	Slava KPSS	Россия24	Russia24
2025	Slava KPSS	Россия14	Russia14

=== Mixtapes ===
Date of Release	Pseudonym	Title	Translation
2015	Slava KPSS	#НЕМИМОХАЙПА	#NOTGOINGPASTTHEHYPE
2016	Slava KPSS	HYPE TRAIN	HYPE TRAIN
2019	Slava KPSS	Оттенки барда	Bard’s Shades
2021	Slava KPSS	ANTIHYPETRAIN	
2022	Slava KPSS	Ангельское True	Angel’s True
2024	Vorovskaya Lapa	МИКСТЕЙП «ПОСТДЕТРОЙТ»	MIXTAPE “POSTDETROIT”
2025	Slava KPSS	Оттенки барда 2	Bard’s Shades 2

=== Mini albums ===
Date of Release	Pseudonym	Title	Translation
2012	Slava KPSS	Ежемесячные	Monthlies
2013	Buter Brodsky	Пих-пох	Pikh-Pokh
2014	Buter Brodsky	КатафалкА	Hearse
2015	Valentin Dyadka	Детская танцевальная музыка	Dance music for children
2015	Valentin Dyadka	Моим евреям	To my Jews
2016	Buter Brodsky	Русское Поле	Russian field
2016	Vorovskaya Lapa	За того парня	For that guy
2016	Slava KPSS	Трудно быть с Богом	It's hard to be with God
2017	Slava KPSS	Комар-Парижанин	Mosquito-Parisian
2018	Slava KPSS	Rare Gods 3	
2018	Big Baby Prilepin	DONBASSBORN	
2019	Buter Brodsky	Бутер Бродский	Buter Brodsky
2020	Gleb Minekhin	Голубицк	Golubitsk
2020	Gleb Minekhin	Гейгород: Рождественская смазка	Gaygorod: Christmas lubricant
2021	Valentin Dyadka	Океан извинений	Ocean of apologies
2021	Buter Brodsky	Lil Бутер	Lil Sandwich
