= That's My Life (My Love and My Home) =

Single by Alfred Lennon
- B-side: "The Next Time You Feel Important"
- Released: 31 December 1965
- Genre: Easy listening
- Length: 3:00
- Label: Piccadilly Records
- Songwriters: Freddie Lennon, Tony Cartwright
- Producer: John Schroeder

"That's My Life (My Love and My Home)" is a 1965 single by Alfred "Freddie" Lennon, the father of the musician John Lennon of the Beatles.

== Background ==
Tony Cartwright, co-author of the song, began writing it with inspiration from Freddie Lennon's stories. It was recorded by a 30-piece orchestra which included the future members of the Jimi Hendrix Experience, Mitch Mitchell and Noel Redding. When released, the song had commercial success. However, the song suddenly disappeared from the charts, an action suspected by Cartwright to be instigated by John Lennon. Alfred, disheartened, abandoned further attempts at a career in music.

== Track listing ==
All songs composed by Freddie Lennon and Tony Cartwright.

No.	Title	Length
1.	"That's My Life (My Love and My Home)"	3:00
2.	"The Next Time You Feel Important"	2:48
