= Rap.ru =

Russian hip-hop portal

- Available in: Russian
- Founded: 2004
- Country of origin: Russia

Rap.ru is a Russian portal dedicated to hip hop culture, founded in 2004.

At the end of 2002, the owners of the Respect Production label, Arkady Slutskovsky and Viktor Abramov, who were promoting the rap group Kasta, decided to create a media outlet with the aim of covering everything relating to hip-hop culture. The label acquired the rap.ru domain, owned by Rostov resident Sergey Pimenov, a member of the electronic group PPK. The label then began assembling a team of writers, led by Alexey Sogomonov, editor-in-chief of the Ukrainian magazine "XZM." The site launched in the summer of 2004 and initially partially used X3M material, as well as writing its own reviews, translating Western press articles, and interviewing local artists. It was then that its first scandal erupted: in response to a review of an album by the group "Братья Наличные," N'Pans, one of its members, wrote a diss track on Rap.ru.

In an interview with the site The Flow, development director Viktor Abramov explained why Rap.ru needed to be launched.

In 2014, there was a change in the publication's management: editor-in-chief Andrei Nikitin and four employees left the publication and launched their own project, The Flow.

== Awards ==
In 2005, the compilation "Rap.ru" took first place in the category "Best Hip-Hop Compilation of 2004" at the second annual ceremony "Hip-Hop.Ru Awards 2004" based on the voting results of users of the website Hip-Hop.Ru.
