= Oyda (song) =

"OYDA"

Single by Oxxxymiron
- Language: Russian
- Released: 16 September 2022
- Recorded: 2022
- Genre: Political hip hop Russian hip hop Russian folklore
- Length: 2:22
- Label: Self-released (distributed by ONErpm)
- Songwriter: Oxxxymiron
- Producer: Danny Zuckerman (uncredited)

Oxxxymiron singles chronology
"Moss" (2021)	"OYDA" (2022)

Music video
- "OYDA" on YouTube

"OYDA" (Russian: ОЙДА ; lit. 'Oh, yes') is a song by Russian artist Oxxxymiron, released on 16 September 2022.

== Background ==
After the start of the Russian invasion of Ukraine, Oxxxymiron canceled his performances in Russia, left the country and held a tour of charity concerts "RAW" (Russians Against War, Russian: Русские против войны). In July 2022, Miron Fyodorov was included in the "list of banned artists". At the beginning of September 2022, Oxxxymiron returned to Saint Petersburg. On the eve of returning to Russia, the Moscow prosecutor's office demanded that the song "Last Call" be recognized as extremist. On September 15, Oxxxymiron started his mailing list called "OnlyFans". The next day, September 16, Miron shared a photo in his mailing list in which he sends an air kiss with the caption - "today".

== Text ==
The song begins with clippings from news releases, which report on the demand to recognize the song "Last Call" as extremist, the RAW charity tour, the return of Oxxxymiron and ask why he returned to Russia. "I killed the Empire in me" - Oxxxymiron mentions that he "hammered" his "IMPERIVM" tattoo and did away with the old idea of the "rap empire" (a reference to the singles "Imperial" and "What is an empire?").“Our flag has white snow and a blue river” – a White-blue-white flag - symbol of Russian anti-war protest - is mentioned. The Russian estrada is condemned, which ignores what is happening in Ukraine and Russian president Vladimir Putin, who “scares us with a nuclear mushroom”. Then the Oxxxymiron declares that he is going underground, sends his regards to the Investigative Committee and the prosecutor's office. "Ingria will be free" - a reference to the "Free Ingria" movement and the Russian opposition slogan "Russia will be free".

== Music video ==
The music video was filmed in Saint Petersburg, Oxxxymiron's hometown, and in less than a day scored over 1.4 million views on YouTube video hosting.

== Reactions ==
The Russian non-governmental organization "Call of the People", whose goal is "the revival of Russia, its traditions and culture," wrote an appeal to the chairman of the Investigative Committee Alexander Bastrykin with a request to check the new clip of Oxxxymiron for extremism. Representatives of the organization believe that Oxxxymiron "promotes the flag of traitors", "mocks" the Investigative Committee and the prosecutor's office and openly supports Ukraine.

Russian rapper Rich called Oxxxymiron a "rapper-collaborator" and considered it unfair that not a single media outlet writes about his song about "the boys who are now sacrificing themselves at the front" when Oxxxymiron is "recommended by everyone, just all the media existing in Russia".

== See also ==
- Generation Cancellation
