= Jimmy Hicks =

American gospel musician

- Genres: Gospel, traditional black gospel
- Occupations: Singer, songwriter
- Instruments: Vocals, singer-songwriter
- Years active: 2001–present
- Labels: Amen, Worldwide
- Website: jimmyhicks.com

Jimmy Hicks is an American gospel musician. He started his music career, in 2001, with the release of, Turn It Around, by Amen Records, and this was his breakthrough release upon the Billboard Gospel Albums chart. His subsequent album, Crossroads, was released in 2003 by Worldwide Gospel Records, but this failed to chart. The third album, Born Blessed, was released by World Wide Gospel in 2006, and this would place upon the aforementioned chart. He released, The Jimmy Hicks Project in 2007, yet this did not chart. He received a Stellar Awards nomination at the 23rd edition.

== Music career ==
His music recording career commenced in 2001, with the album, Turn It Around, and it was released by Amen Records, and it was his breakthrough release upon the Billboard Gospel Albums chart at No. 11. The subsequent album, Crossroads, released on February 25, 2003, by Worldwide Gospel Records, but this album did not chart. He released, Born Blessed, on January 10, 2006, by Worldwide Gospel Albums, and this placed upon the aforementioned chart at No. 26. His album, The Jimmy Hicks Project, was released by Worldwide Gospel Albums on June 12, 2007, yet this album failed to chart. He received a Stellar Awards nomination at the 23rd edition, for Song of the Year.

== Discography ==
List of studio albums, with selected chart positions
Title	Album details	Peak chart positions
Title	Album details	US Gos
Turn It Around	Released: 2001; Label: Amen; CD, digital download	11
Crossroads	Released: February 25, 2003; Label: Worldwide; CD, digital download	–
Born Blessed	Released: January 10, 2006; Label: Worldwide; CD, digital download	26
The Jimmy Hicks Project	Released: June 12, 2007; Label: Worldwide; CD, digital download	–
