= Alfred Lennon =

Father of English musician John Lennon (1912–1976)

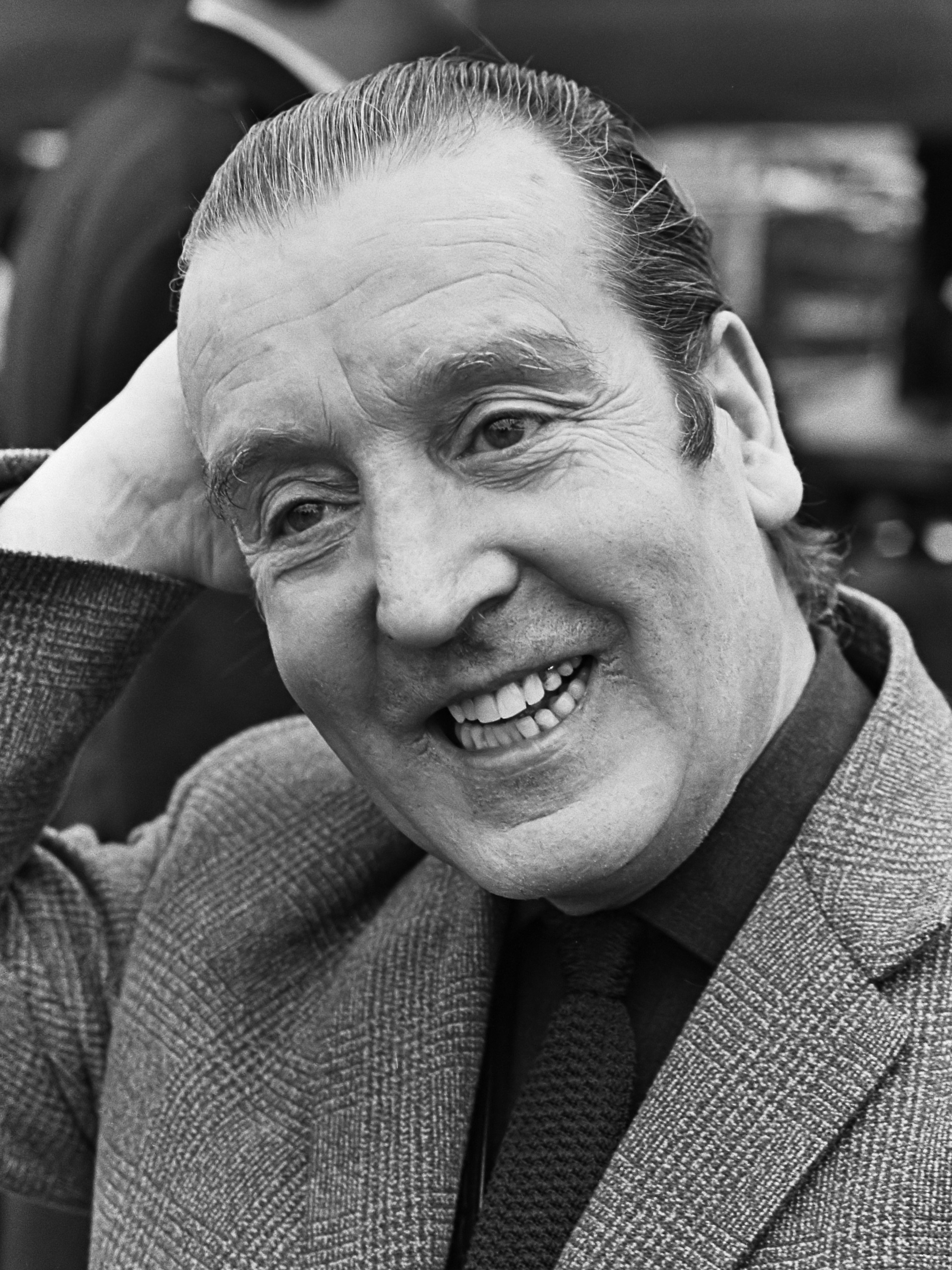
- Lennon in 1966
- Born: 14 December 1912; Liverpool, Lancashire, England
- Died: 1 April 1976 (aged 63); Brighton, East Sussex, England
- Occupations: office-boy; bellboy; steward; merchant seaman; kitchen porter; dishwasher; singer
- Spouses: Julia Stanley (m. 1938; died 1958) Pauline Jones (m. 1968)
- Children: 3, including John
- Relatives: Julian Lennon (grandson); Sean Lennon (grandson)

Alfred Lennon (14 December 1912 – 1 April 1976), also known as Freddie Lennon, was an English seaman and singer who was best known as the father of musician John Lennon.

Lennon married Julia Stanley in 1938. John was their only child, but, as Alfred was away at sea during World War II, he did not see his son much during infancy. During this period, Julia became pregnant with another man's child. Alfred offered to look after his wife, their child, and the expected baby, but Julia rejected the idea. Alfred had very little contact with his son until Beatlemania, when they met again, but later the pair had only intermittent contact with each other. Alfred died in Brighton, England, where he had lived since marrying Pauline Jones, with whom he had two sons.

== Family background ==
Alfred Lennon's family had Irish ancestry. James Lennon (c. 1829 – 1898) and Jane McConville (c. 1831 – 1869), Alfred's grandparents, moved with their respective families to Liverpool in the 1840s. Their son, Jack, was born in 1855, and became a "refined" British minstrel, who toured the United States with Roberton's Kentucky Minstrels vaudeville troupe in the late 19th century. It is also claimed that Jack's first wife was an American who died during childbirth after they had both moved back to Liverpool. Jack eventually married Polly in 1915, after they had moved to Elmore Street, Everton. One of the witnesses at the wedding was Polly's sister, Catherine Seddon. Daughter Edith Lennon was born that year and then Charles (21 November 1918 – 26 May 2002). The Lennons moved back to Toxteth Park. By this time, Jack worked as a shipping clerk; he died in 1921, at 57 Copperfield Street. Polly could not read or write, but was reported to be very humorous and supposedly had psychic abilities. After Jack died, Polly did not have enough money to keep the whole Lennon family together, so she placed two of her children, Alfred and Edith, in the Blue Coat School Orphanage. It was situated just around the corner from Newcastle Road (where Julia Stanley lived). Polly died on 30 January 1949.

== Early life ==
Alfred Lennon (always called 'Alf' by his family), was known as being happy-go-lucky, and "couldn't resist having a good time". He had rickets as a child and wore leg braces, which led to his growth being stunted at 5 feet 4 inches (1.63 m). In 1927, Lennon auditioned for a children's music hall act, Will Murray's Gang, at the Empire Theatre in Liverpool. Having passed the audition, he ran away from the orphanage and joined the show. Lennon travelled with the troupe for a time before being discovered in Glasgow and returned to the orphanage, where he was severely punished. Lennon was known as being always quick with a joke or a witty line, but never held a job for any length of time. When he was 15 years old, Lennon left the Bluecoat orphanage and found a job as an office-boy, but preferred to visit Liverpool's many vaudeville theatres and cinemas, where he knew the usherettes by name. Lennon's brother, Sydney, often lent money to him after getting a job in a tailor's shop.

== Relationship with Julia Stanley ==
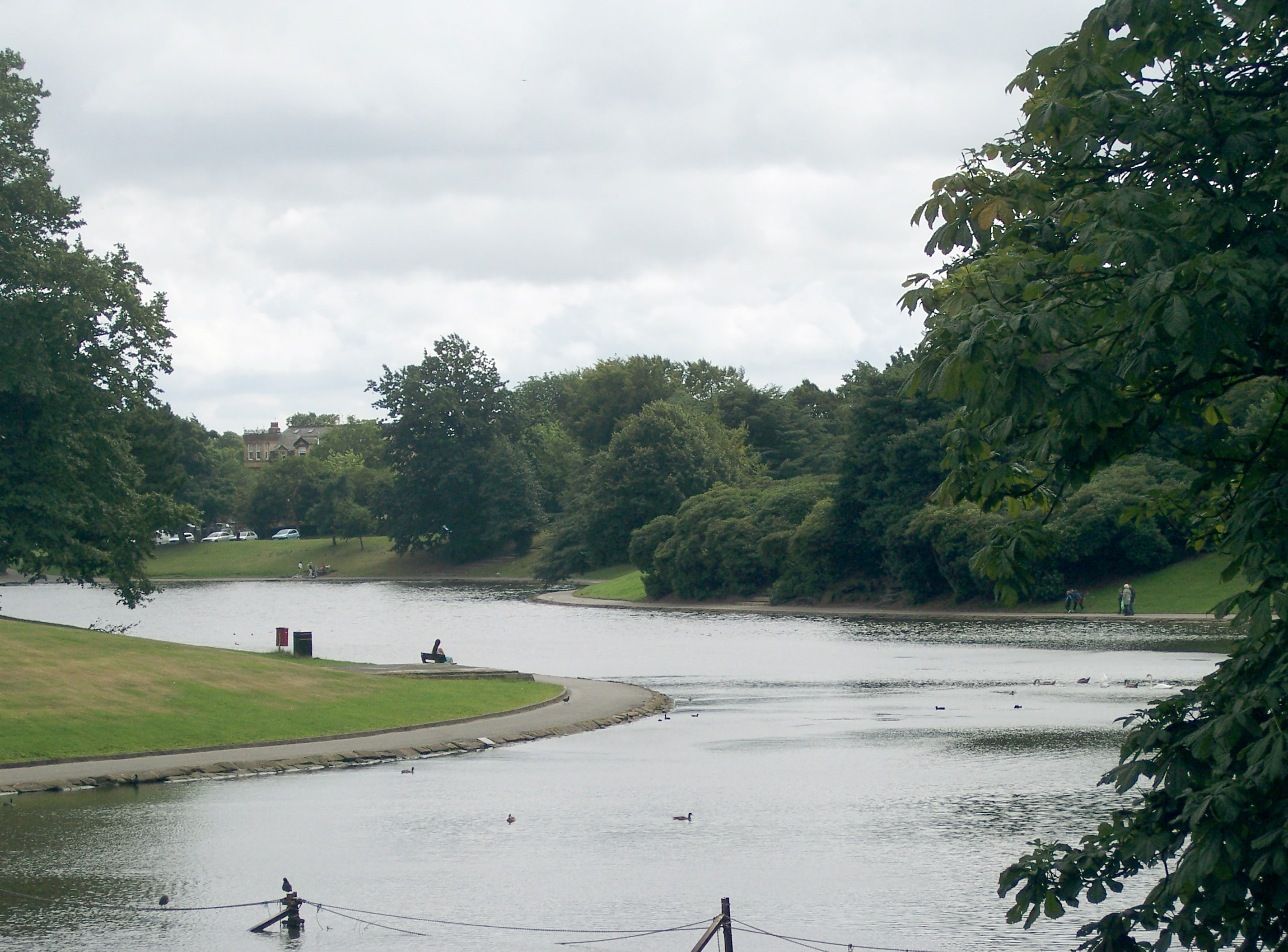
Sefton Park, where Julia Stanley first met Alfred Lennon

Lennon first saw Julia Stanley at the Trocadero club, a converted cinema on Camden Road, Liverpool. Although he did not speak to her at the time, Lennon later saw Julia again in Sefton Park, where he had gone with a friend to meet girls. Lennon, who was dressed in a bowler hat and holding a cigarette holder, saw "this little waif" sitting on a wrought-iron bench. The 14-year-old Stanley said that his hat looked "silly," to which the 15-year-old Lennon replied that Stanley looked "lovely," and sat down next to her. Stanley asked Lennon to take off his hat, which he promptly did and threw it straight into the lake.

Alfred was a musician, and specialised in impersonating Louis Armstrong and Al Jolson. He played the banjo, as did Julia, although neither pursued music professionally (Julia would later teach their son how to play the banjo). They spent their days together walking around Liverpool and dreaming of what they would do in the future—such as opening a shop, pub, café, or a club. In March 1930, he took a job as bellboy on board the Cunard passenger liner SS Montrose. He kept in touch with Julia, writing letters and meeting whenever he docked in Liverpool. Alfred was later offered a job on a whaling ship for two years—which would have earned him enough money to buy a house—but turned it down on discovering that Julia's father had arranged it, in order to keep him away from Julia.

On 3 December 1938, 11 years after they had first met, Julia married Alfred after proposing to him. They were married in the Bolton Street Register Office, and on the marriage certificate Julia stated her occupation as 'cinema usherette', even though she had never been one. Julia's family were absent from the wedding, but Alfred's brother Sydney acted as a witness. They spent their honeymoon eating at Reece's restaurant in Clayton Square (which is where his son would later celebrate after his marriage to Cynthia Powell), and then went to a cinema. On their wedding night, Julia stayed at the Stanleys' house and Alfred returned to his rooming house.

Julia's family were opposed to Alfred: her father said he was "certainly not middle class," and her sister Mimi was particularly unimpressed by him. Julia's father demanded concrete evidence that he could financially support Julia, but Alfred's only idea was to sign on as a Merchant Navy bellboy on a ship bound for the Mediterranean. He later worked on ocean liners that travelled between the Greek islands, North Africa and the West Indies. Whilst away he graduated from bellboy to steward, and on his return to Liverpool moved into the Stanley home in Newcastle Road. He auditioned for local theatre managers as a 'ship's entertainer,' but had no success, and so returned to sea.

== Birth of John Lennon and disappearance ==
Julia discovered that she was pregnant in April 1940. John Winston Lennon was born at 6:30 pm on 9 October 1940, on the second-floor ward of Liverpool Maternity Hospital at Oxford Street. Suppositions that this was during a German air raid have been disproven. Alfred first saw his son that November when he returned from working as a merchant seaman on troop transports during World War II. He sent regular pay cheques to Julia, who lived with her son at 9 Newcastle Road (the Stanley family's home). He occasionally returned to Liverpool, but did not stay long before being sent off on another ship. The cheques to Julia stopped in 1943 when he went absent without leave. Neither Julia nor the Merchant Navy knew of his whereabouts. Julia discovered his disappearance because she stopped receiving her allowance money, and the Navy wrote to inform her that it was looking for him.

Alfred later told his version of what happened while he was AWOL in 1943. He claimed that he had sailed from the United States to Bône, North Africa, but was arrested for stealing one bottle of beer from the ship. He consequently served nine days in a military prison. After his release he became involved in various "shady deals", allegedly rescued from a criminal gang of Arabs. He eventually served on a troopship from North Africa to Italy before finally boarding a ship that was making its way to England in 1944.

== Return to Liverpool ==
Julia had started going to dance halls in 1942, and met a Welsh soldier named 'Taffy' Williams who was stationed in the barracks at Mossley Hill. Alfred blamed himself for this, as he had written to Julia urging her to go out and enjoy herself because there was a war on. Julia took his advice, and often gave her young son a piece of chocolate or sugar pastry the next morning for breakfast that she had received the night before. She became pregnant by Williams in late 1944, although initially claiming that she had been raped by an unknown soldier.

When Alfred eventually returned to Liverpool on 13 January 1945, he offered to look after Julia, their son, and the expected baby, but Julia rejected the idea. A few months before the birth, Alfred took John to his brother Sydney's house, in the Liverpool suburb of Maghull. Julia gave birth to a daughter, Victoria, who was subsequently placed for adoption (after intense pressure from Julia's father and family) to a Norwegian Salvation Army Captain. Julia later met Bobby Dykins and lived with him, but after considerable pressure from Mimi—who twice contacted Liverpool's Social Services and complained about the infant sleeping in the same bed as Julia and Dykins—Julia reluctantly handed the care of her son over to Mimi. According to his brother Charlie, people would visit the Lennon house in Copperfield Street while Alfred was away at sea, offering large sums of money (up to £300) if Alfred would divorce Julia, but Charlie told them to "get lost".

In June 1946, Alfred visited Mimi's house at 251 Menlove Avenue and took his son to Blackpool for a long "holiday"—but secretly intended to emigrate to New Zealand with him. Julia and Dykins discovered this and followed them to Blackpool, and after a heated argument, Alfred made the five-year-old boy choose between Julia or him. John chose Alfred (twice), and then Julia walked away, but in the end, John, crying, followed her, although this has been disputed. According to author Mark Lewisohn, Lennon's parents agreed that Julia should take him and give him a home as Alfred left again. A witness who was there that day, Billy Hall, has said that the dramatic scene, often portrayed with a young John Lennon having to make a decision between his parents, never happened.

== Later contact with John ==
Alfred lost contact with the family until Beatlemania, when he and John met again. In 1968, John Lennon told Hunter Davies that he soon forgot his father, saying, "It was like he was dead." In 1949, Alfred's career at sea ended when he was sentenced to six months' imprisonment. He had been drinking when, late at night, he saw a mannequin in a wedding dress shop window. He smashed the window, took the mannequin, and danced with it in the street until he was arrested. In 1958, when Alfred was working with Charlie Lennon in the Barn Restaurant in Solihull, their brother Sydney sent a newspaper clipping from the Liverpool Echo reporting that Julia had died. A saddened Alfred left Solihull for London, but he kept in touch with Charlie by telephone.

Alfred made no real attempt to contact John until the height of Beatlemania (claiming he did not know who the Beatles were). He was working as a kitchen porter at the Greyhound Hotel at Hampton Court, in Middlesex, when someone pointed to a photograph of John Lennon in a newspaper asking whether he was related to him. Alfred, along with Charlie, visited one of the Beatles' Christmas shows at the Finsbury Park Empire in London. When the Beatles were filming a scene for A Hard Day's Night in the Scala Theatre in Soho in April 1964, Alfred walked into Brian Epstein's NEMS office in Argyle Street with a journalist. When Epstein was informed that Alfred was John Lennon's father, he "went into a panic," immediately sending a car to bring John to the office. Alfred was shabbily dressed, with his unkempt, thinning grey hair greased back. When John arrived, Alfred stuck out his hand, but John did not take it, asking, "What do you want?" Alfred placated John somewhat by saying, "You can't turn your back on your family, no matter what they've done." Their conversation did not last long, as John soon ordered Alfred and the journalist out of the NEMS office. The Beatles' personal stories were kept out of the newspapers—by agreement with journalists who were offered exclusive stories in return—but one day John opened a copy of the Daily Express seeing a photo of his father.

A few weeks later, John's wife Cynthia opened the door of Kenwood (their home in Weybridge) to see a man who "looked like a tramp" but, alarmingly, with John's face. Cynthia invited Alfred in to wait for John to return home. While waiting, Cynthia made Alfred tea and cheese on toast, and offered to cut his "long, stringy locks" of hair, which he allowed. After waiting for a couple of hours, Alfred left. John was annoyed when he arrived home, telling Cynthia about Alfred's visit to the NEMS office a few weeks earlier. Later he relented and contacted Alfred over the next few months, telling Cynthia, "Alright, Cyn. He's a bit 'wacky,' like me." After Christmas, in 1965, John was embarrassed to learn that Alfred had made a record: "That's My Life (My Love and My Home)", released on 31 December 1965. John asked Epstein to do anything he could to stop it being released or becoming a hit. The record never made it into the charts.

== Relationship with Pauline Jones ==
Three years after meeting John in the NEMS office, Alf appeared at Kenwood again with his fiancée Pauline Jones. Pauline had been an 18-year-old Exeter University student and a Rolling Stones fan when she met the 53-year-old Alfred in 1966. Alfred asked John if he could give Pauline a job, so she was hired to help, looking after Julian Lennon and also the piles of fan mail. Pauline spent a few months living at Kenwood in the attic bedroom. In 1968, Alfred and Pauline grew tired of trying to convince Pauline's mother to allow them to marry, so they eloped and got married in Gretna Green, Scotland. Alfred and Pauline moved to a flat in Bourne Court, London Road, Patcham, Brighton before moving to Ladies Mile Road, Brighton, in November 1969. Alfred had two sons with Pauline: David Henry Lennon, born 26 February 1969, and Robin Francis Lennon, born 22 October 1973.

== Death ==
Late in his life, Alfred wrote a manuscript detailing his life story which he bequeathed to John. It was Alfred's attempt to fill in the lost years when he had not been in contact with his son, explaining that it was Julia, not Alfred, who had broken up their marriage. John later commented: "You know, all he wanted was for me to hear his side of the story, which I hadn't heard." By 1976, Alfred was diagnosed with terminal stomach cancer. Pauline contacted John via Apple Corps to make sure that he was aware that his father was dying. John sent a large bouquet of flowers to the hospital, phoning Alfred on his deathbed, and apologized for his [John's] past behaviour.

On 1 April 1976, Alfred Lennon died in Brighton, at the age of 63, just nine days after Paul McCartney's father Jim McCartney died. His remains were cremated.

In 1990, Pauline published a book called Daddy, Come Home, detailing her life with Alfred and his meetings with John. The book was largely influenced by Alfred's unpublished memoir manuscript. Pauline later remarried.

== Legacy ==
Alfred was portrayed by Colin Tierny in Nowhere Boy and by Christopher Fairbank in Lennon Naked.
