= Optik Records =

German hip hop label

Optik Records was a German hip hop label located in Berlin. The label was shut down in 2009 due to financial problems.

== History ==
Founded in 2002 by Kool Savas, early records included "Optik Crew: Optik Mixtape Vol.1" by various label artists and "Der beste Tag meines Lebens" by Kool Savas. The Optik Youngstarz were founded in 2005 which included founder Savas' cousin. Also in 2005, Kool Savas released "Die John Bello Story". The 2006 Kool Savas/Optik Records compilation Optik Takeover was a hit in central Europe, reaching #8 on the German album charts, #39 in Switzerland, and #40 in Austria. The last album released unter the subcontract with Sony BMG/Subword was "Tot oder Lebendig" by Kool Savas in 2007.

In July 2008, Savas announced that Optik Records would cease operations due to financial difficulties after the tour in January 2009. The label shut down in February 2009.

== Artists ==
=== Optik Records ===
- Kool Savas
- Ercandize
- Caput (rapper)
- Kaas (rapper)
- Amar (rapper)
- Franky Kubrick
- Moe Mitchell
- Christyle
- Melbeatz
- DJ Nicon
- DJ Sir Jai

=== Optik Schweiz ===
- Dezmond Dez

=== Optik Russia ===
- I.G.O.R.
- Oxxxymiron
- Schokk
- 1.Kla$
- Czar
- Dandy

== Discography ==
=== Albums ===
- 2002 Kool Savas: Der Beste Tag Meines Lebens
- 2004 Kool Savas: Die besten Tage sind gezählt/Euer Bester Freund
- 2004 Melbeatz: Rapper's Delight (LP)
- 2004 Optik Records Präsentiert: OPTIK TAKE OVER 04 - Summer Edition
- 2005 Kool Savas & Azad: One
- 2006 Kool Savas & Optik Army: Optik Takeover
- 2007 Ercandize: Verbrannte Erde
- 2007 Kool Savas: Tot oder lebendig
- 2008 Caput: Caputalismus
- 2008 Franky Kubrick: Dramaking - Tagebuch eines Träumers
- 2008 Kool Savas: Die John Bello Story 2

=== Singles ===
- 2002 Kool Savas: Till' Ab Joe
- 2003 Kool Savas: Optik Anthem Feat. Optik Crew
- 2004 Kool Savas feat. Lumidee: Die besten Tage sind gezählt
- 2004 Melbeatz feat. Kool Savas & Samy Deluxe: OK
- 2004 Kool Savas: Da bin, Da Bleib
- 2005 Kool Savas: Das Urteil
- 2005 Kool Savas & Azad: Monstershit
- 2005 Kool Savas & Azad: All 4 One
- 2005 Kool Savas & Azad: Guck My Man
- 2006 Kool Savas & Optik Army: Das ist O.R.
- 2006 Kool Savas & Optik Army: Komm mit mir
- 2007 Kool Savas: Tot oder lebendig
- 2008 Kool Savas: Melodie feat. Moe Mitchell & Senna (Monrose)

=== EPs ===
- 2003 Kool Savas feat. Valezka: Der Beste Tag Meines Lebens (EP)
- 2003 SD: Wie Es Geht / Oh
- 2004 Caput: Sieben
- 2004 SD: Dirrrty
- 2004 Ercandize: Willkommen im Dschungel

=== Mixtapes ===
- 2002 Optik Crew: Optik Mixtape Vol.1
- 2003 DJ Nicon: Optische Elemente
- 2003 DJ Nicon: Optische Elemente Pt.2
- 2004 Kool Savas: Kool Savas goes Hollywood
- 2004 Ercandize: Best Of Ercandize
- 2004 Kutmasta Kurt: Redneck Olympics
- 2005 Caput: Die Caputte Sicht
- 2005 Kool Savas & Optik Records Präsentieren: Die John Bello Story
- 2005 DJ Nicon: Optische Elemente 2.5
- 2005 DJ Nicon & DJ Fiks: Crunkshit
- 2006 Ercandize & DJ Katch: Ear 2 The Street Vol.2
- 2006 Ercandize: La Haine / Sie nannten ihn Mücke
- 2006 Franky Kubrick: Mein Moneyfest
- 2007 Amar: Cho! Hier habt ihr euer Mixtape
- 2007 Kool Savas & Optik Records präsentieren: No Money? No Problem!
- 2008 Franky Kubrick: Chronisch Frank (online mixtape)
- 2008 Franky Kubrick: Chronisch Frank 2 (online mixtape)

=== DVDs ===
- 2003 Kool Savas: Der Beste Tag Meines Lebens
- 2005 Kool Savas & Azad: One
- 2006 Kool Savas: Feuer über Deutschland
- 2008 Kool Savas: Tot oder Lebendig LIVE
