= Mike Reynolds (actor) =

American voice actor and writer (1929–2022)

- Born: November 21, 1929
- Died: July 2, 2022 (aged 92)
- Resting place: Ashes scattered at sea
- Occupations: Voice actor, writer
- Years active: 1967–2008

Michael Lee Reynolds (November 21, 1929 – July 2, 2022) was an American voice actor and writer.

== Career ==
Reynolds had been a voice actor in animation and anime movies since 1973 until 2004, and had also been a screen actor in movies. His most distinctive acting characteristic was his gruff, gravely voice.

He had voice roles in the Power Rangers franchise until 2002. Some of his best-known roles are the voice of General Ivar in VR Troopers, Captain Mutiny in Power Rangers: Lost Galaxy, and Gennai in the American English dub of Digimon Adventure. Reynolds also made an appearance on Larry David's show Curb Your Enthusiasm.

== Death ==
Reynolds died on July 2, 2022. He was cremated and his ashes were spread at sea.

== Dubbing roles ==
=== Anime dubbing ===
- 8 Man After - Chief Tanaka
- Aesop's Fables - The North Wind
- Akira - Mr. Nezu (Animaze dub)
- Aladdin and the Magic Lamp - The Genie of the Ring (Sync, Ltd. dub version)
- Appleseed - Elder
- Arc the Lad - Bibiga
- Armitage III - Lt. Larry Randolph
- Around the World with Willy Fog - Additional Voices
- Attack of the Super Monsters - Emperor Tyrannus, Styracosaurus
- Barefoot Gen - Various (Streamline dub)
- Bastard!! - Various
- The Big O - Sven Marisky
- Biohunter - Bokudoh
- Button Nose - King Krumpet
- Call of the Wild: Howl Buck - John Thornton
- Carried by the Wind: Tsukikage Ran - Kikuhimeya Housemaster
- Casshan: Robot Hunter - Various
- The Castle of Cagliostro - Groundskeeper, German Councilmember (Streamline version)
- Cowboy Bebop - Van
- Cowboy Bebop: The Movie - Colonel
- Crimson Wolf - Yen Pao Lin
- Crying Freeman - Brainwasher, Jigon, Master Naitai (Streamline dub)
- Cyborg 009 The Cyborg Soldier - Dr. Kozumi, Poseidon
- Demetan Croaker, The Boy Frog - Various
- Digimon Adventure/Digimon Adventure 02 - Old Gennai
- Digimon: The Movie - Gennai
- DNA Sights 999.9 - Professor Shimaoka
- Dogtanian and the Three Muskehounds - Widimer
- Doomed Megalopolis - Yamumasa Hirai
- Dragon Ball - King Gurumes (Harmony Gold dub)
- Dragon Slayer - Rias
- El Hazard: The Wanderers - Village Chief
- Fist of the North Star - Gojiba, Lynn's Captor
- Gatchaman - Braddock
- Ghost in the Shell - Minister (as Hank Smith)
- Ghost in the Shell: Stand Alone Complex - Chief Nibu, Justice Minister
- Ghost in the Shell: Stand Alone Complex 2nd Gig - Commissioner-General
- Golgo 13: The Professional - Lt. Bob Bragan
- Grimm's Fairy Tale Classics - Various characters
- Hello Carbot - Storm
- Honeybee Hutch - Additional Voices
- Kiki's Delivery Service - Hometown Adult 1, Ket's Grandmother (Streamline dub)
- Kyofu Densetsu: Kaiki! Furankenshutain - Grandfather
- Laputa: Castle in the Sky - General (original English dub) (as Mark Richards)
- Lensman - Gary Kinnison
- Lensman: Secret of the Lens - Admiral Haynes (Harmony Gold dub), Ken (Streamline dub)
- Lily C.A.T. - Captain Mike Hamilton
- Mars Daybreak - Various
- Maple Town - Various
- Mirage of Blaze - Various
- Mon Colle Knights - Centaur King
- Noozles - Additional Voices
- Ninja Robots - Grathan Gryn
- Outlaw Star - Old Man
- The Professional - Lt. Bob Bragan
- Raijin-Oh - Secretary of Defense
- Robotech - Dolza, Senator Russo
- Robotech: The Untold Story - Various
- Rurouni Kenshin - Takuma Hashizume
- Saint Tail - Butler, Mayor
- Samurai X - Okina
- The Sea Prince and the Fire Child - Aristurtle
- The Story of Fifteen Boys - Walston
- Street Fighter II V - Interpol Chief
- Street Fighter II: The Movie - Minister Sellers
- Tales of Little Women - James Lawrence
- Tekkaman Blade - Galt
- The Return of Dogtanian - Widimer
- Transformers: Robots in Disguise - Railspike
- Wicked City - Giuseppe Maiyart
- Wild Arms: Twilight Venom - Babo
- Wolf's Rain - Lord Orkham
- Wowser - Additional Voices
- Zillion - Big Scout, Minister

== Filmography ==
=== Animation ===
- Creepy Crawlers - Additional Voices
- Journey to the Heart of the World - Professor Fortier
- The Little Train - Il Trenino Del Pianeta Favola (Harmony Gold English dub) - The Big Bad Wolf
- The Treasure Planet - Billy Bones
- The Smurfs and the Magic Flute - Matthew McCreep
- Peter-No-Tail in Americat - Old Bearcat
- Walter Melon - Various
- The Wisdom of The Gnomes - Additional Voices
- Captain Of The Forest (Az erdő kapitánya) - Captain Schnauzer

=== Live-action voice-over ===
- Power Rangers Wild Force - Ship Org
- Power Rangers Time Force - Mr. Mechanau (mutant form)
- Power Rangers Lost Galaxy - Captain Mutiny
- Power Rangers in Space - Destructipede (uncredited)
- Big Bad Beetleborgs - Terror Bear
- VR Troopers - General Ivar
- Mighty Morphin Power Rangers - Pineoctopus, Spit Flower, Key Keeper, Scatterbrain, Mondo the Magician, Lanterra (uncredited)
- Cinema Paradiso - Alfredo
- Masked Rider - Masked Rider Warrior Commander, Masked Rider Strongman
- Cinema Paradiso - Alfredo - uncredited

=== Video games ===
- Star Trek: 25th Anniversary Enhanced (1992) Alien Reptile, Ies Bredell
- Star Trek: Judgment Rites (1993) Ies Bredell

=== Television ===
- The A-Team - Don Sharp (Episode: "The Road to Hope")
- Curb Your Enthusiasm - Waiter (Episode: "The Thong")
- The Twilight Zone - Driver (Episode: "Paladin of the Lost Hour")

=== Film ===
- Harry in Your Pocket (1973) Man in Train Station
- Stacy's Knights (1983) Shecky Poole
- Young Lady Chatterley II (1985) Howard Beechum III
- Bad Guys (1986) Repo Man
- Off the Mark (1987) Doctor
- Night Life (1989) Policeman #5
- Tornado Run (1995) Norman Borden
- Who's the Caboose? (1997) Susan's Landlord

== Staff work ==
=== Writer ===
- The Adventures of Huckleberry Finn
- The Adventures of Tom Sawyer
- Bob in a Bottle
- Bleach
- Bumpety Boo
- Codename: Robotech
- Creepy Crawlers
- Destiny of The Shrine Maidens
- Digimon Adventure
- Gad Guard
- Grimm's Fairy Tale Classics
- Hallo Spencer
- Heat Guy J
- Jin Jin and the Panda Patrol
- Jungle de Ikou!
- Jungle Tales
- The Littl' Bits
- Little Train (Also acts)
- Magic Knight Rayearth
- Maple Town
- Maya the Bee
- Mirage of Blaze
- Ninja Robots
- Noozles
- Ox Tales
- Planetes
- Tales of Little Women (also acts)
- The Return of Dogtanian
- Robotech
- Saban's Adventures of the Little Mermaid
- Saban's Adventures of Peter Pan
- Saban's Adventures of Pinocchio
- Samurai Pizza Cats
- Sandokan
- Steel inferno
- Stellvia
- Tenko and the Guardians of the Magic
- The Wisdom of The Gnomes
- Wowser

=== Miscellaneous crew ===
- Codename: Robotech - Dialogue Director
- Robotech - Dialogue Director
- Space Pirate Captain Harlock - Reversioning & Dialogue
- White Fang - ADR Loop Group
