= Ardwight Chamberlain =

American voice actor and screen writer

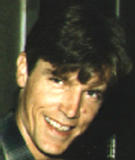
- Born: February 16, 1957 (age 69); San Mateo, California, U.S.
- Other names: R.D. Chamberlain, R.D. Makepeace, R. Dwight
- Occupations: Voice actor, screenwriter

Ardwight Chamberlain (sometimes credited as R.D. Chamberlain or R. Dwight; born February 16, 1957) is an American voice actor and screen writer currently living in Los Angeles, California. He is best known as the voice of Vorlon Ambassador Kosh on the science-fiction television series Babylon 5. He has also written a number of episodes for the animated TV show Digimon: Digital Monsters, has appeared on the game show Jeopardy!, and has written and provided voices for the English dubbed versions of several Japanese anime.

Chamberlain did the voice for both Kosh (a main cast member of the series) and Ulkesh in the Babylon 5 series starting in 1994 until 1997, totaling 20 episodes. Although he has been "the voice" of Kosh, the man underneath the encounter suit was Jeffrey Willerth.

He provides the voice for the character of Nicolai (Nicolas) Conrad in the English language version of the video game Shadow Hearts: Covenant (2004).

== Filmography ==
=== Voice Roles ===
==== Anime ====
- 8 Man After - Chen
- Barefoot Gen - Mr. Pak, Narrator
- Casshan: Robot Hunter - Akubon
- Dinozaurs - Drago Elephas
- Doomed Megalopolis - Kamo
- Katy Caterpillar - Boss Bee
- Lupin the 3rd: The Mystery of Mamo - Goemon Ishikawa XIII (Streamline dub)
- Nadia: The Secret of Blue Water - Jean (Streamline dub)
- Robotech II: The Sentinels - Rem
- Swiss Family Robinson - Fritz Robinson
- Tales of Little Women - John Brooke
- Unico - Devil, Gods
- Zentrix - Webster

==== Television ====
- Babylon 5 - Kosh, Ulkesh, Vorlon

==== Video games ====
- Shadow Hearts: Covenant - Nicolas Conrad

=== Production credits ===
==== Voice Director ====
- Aladdin and the Magic Lamp
- Katy Caterpillar
- Robotech: The Movie
- Teknoman

==== Script Writing ====
- 8 Man After
- Babylon 5
- Barefoot Gen
- Bleach: Thousand-Year Blood War
- Captain Harlock and the Queen of a Thousand Years
- Casshan: Robot Hunter
- Crimson Wolf
- Digimon: Digital Monsters
- Digimon Adventure Tri
- Dirty Pair: Affair of Nolandia
- Dirty Pair: Flight 005 Conspiracy
- Dirty Pair: Project Eden
- DNA Sights 999.9
- Dragon Slayer: The Legend of Heroes
- Dragon Warrior
- Dream-Star Button Nose
- Final Fantasy: Legend of the Crystals
- Glitter Force
- Golgo 13: Queen Bee
- Goku: Midnight Eye
- Grimm Masterpiece Theater
- The Littl' Bits
- Lupin III: The Mystery of Mamo
- Maple Town Stories
- Marvel Anime
- Naruto
- Neo-Tokyo
- Ninja Scroll: The Series
- Noozles
- Ox Tales
- Reign: The Conqueror
- Robotech
- Saban's Adventures of Peter Pan
- Saban's Adventures of Pinocchio
- Sailor Moon SuperS
- Saint Tail
- Samurai Pizza Cats
- The Sea Prince and the Fire Child
- Stitch!
- Tiger & Bunny
- Unico
- Wowser
- Zatch Bell!
