= Dave Mallow =

American voice actor (1948–2025)

- Born: October 19, 1948
- Died: March 11, 2025 (aged 76); Altadena, California, U.S.
- Other name: Colin Phillips
- Occupation: Voice actor
- Years active: 1969–2019
- Agent: AVO Talent
- Awards: 1st Annual American Anime Awards (nominated for Best Actor and also in a Comedy in January 2007 in NYC)
- Website: Official website

Dave Mallow (October 19, 1948 – March 11, 2025) was an American voice actor.

== Life and career ==
Mallow was born on October 19, 1948. His father worked in radio and television and was a 30-year on-air veteran at Chicago's WGN. After graduating from Maine South High School, Mallow attained a BFA in Theater Arts from Drake University in 1970. After a successful 12-year career as a radio personality in the Midwestern United States and New York City, he moved to Los Angeles in 1984 to pursue a career in voice acting that has included commercials, film dubbing, looping, narration, audio books, radio plays and voice characterization in numerous video games, toys and cartoons. He provided the daily intros and various monsters for Saban Productions, including Baboo in Mighty Morphin Power Rangers; Angemon, Gekkomon and Uppamon in Digimon: Digital Monsters and also is remembered for voicing Amarao in Digital Manga's FLCL, Herzog in the alternative reality game I Love Bees and Akuma in the Street Fighter franchise among numerous others.

On March 11, 2025, fellow voice actress Dorothy Elias-Fahn reported that Mallow had died early that day. He was 76.

== Roles ==
=== Anime ===
- Adventures on Rainbow Pond - Jonathan Jumper
- Ajin - The Minister
- Apocalypse Zero - Shimada Kazu
- Arc the Lad - Shu
- Argento Soma - Base Guard, Doctor, Ground Control, Ulysses Transmission
- B-Daman Crossfire - Lightning Dravise, Emcee
- Babel II - Hikaru Homura
- Bastard!! - Messenger
- Big Rig Buddies - Lanky the Crane Truck (formerly), Felix's Dad
- Black Jack - Boardmember, Mikazuki Victim, Refugee, Relief Committee Representative, Villager C
- Blade of the Immortal - Sori
- Bleach - Kensei Muguruma, Aaroniero Arruruerie (Kaien), Kaien Shiba (after Kim Strauss), Inose
- Blood: The Last Vampire - Announcer, Ted
- Blue Dragon - Grankingdom Captain
- Blue Exorcist - Ernst Frederik Egin
- Burn-Up Scramble - Narrator
- Captain Harlock and the Queen of a Thousand Years - various
- Carried by the Wind: Tsukikage Ran - Lord Matsuzaka
- Code Geass: Lelouch of the Rebellion - Britannian Bridge Officer, Britannian Officer
- Code Geass: Lelouch of the Rebellion R2 - Chief Officer
- Computer Warriors - Scanner
- Cosmowarrior Zero - Mechanized Man 1, Mechanized Man 2, Nohara, Secretary
- Daigunder - Track Announcer
- Detatoko Princess - Barell, King/Morita
- Digimon series - Angemon/MagnaAngemon, Seraphimon, Upamon, Pegasusmon, Elecmon, Togemon, Ring Announcer, Gekomon, Numemon, Otamamon, Agent #1, Tokomon, Angemon, Piddomon, Vilemon, Grani
- Dragon Ball - Oolong (Dragon Ball) (MaoMao) (Harmony Gold dub)
- Durarara!! - Yoshida, Kanra
- Durarara!!x2 - Various
- Eagle Riders - Various
- Eiken - Shimada
- Eureka Seven - Jobs
- Eyeshield 21 - Stadium Announcer
- Hunter × Hunter – Gotoh
- Fist of the North Star - Hart, Guard Captain
- FLCL - Commander Amarao
- Flint the Time Detective - Coconaut
- Gad Guard - Black, Cop, Man with Briefcase, World Electro Doorman
- Galerians - Rainheart, Dr. Pascalle
- Gate Keepers - Opening Narrator
- Ghost in the Shell: Stand Alone Complex 2nd Gig - Gohda's Aide
- Ghost Slayers Ayashi - Nioya, Zusyo Okada
- Genma Wars - Chief Monkey
- Great Teacher Onizuka - Kouichi Igurashi
- Grenadier - Teppa's Father
- Gungrave - Evans, Gary
- Gun Frontier - Custodian, Painter
- GUNxSWORD - Chief
- Gurren Lagann - The Anti-Spiral
- Hand Maid May - various
- Heat Guy J - Casino Security Guard C, Hooligan C, Mask Maker, News Anchor, Researcher B, Shogun's Informant A, Thomas Park, Thug A
- Here is Greenwood - Bible Man, Lupin, Nagisa's Man D, Student with Glasses (Media Blasters Dub)
- Higurashi When They Cry - Kyousuke Irie
- Idol Project - Evie
- If I See You in My Dreams - Kujira, Niimi, Miho's Boss
- Immortal Grand Prix - Glass Jones, MC, Mechanic B, Private Investigator, Weatherman
- Iron Virgin Jun - Headguard
- Iznogoud - Iznogoud, Saltan, The Caliph
- Jin Jin and the Panda Patrol - Squawk, Rudy, Mugsy
- JoJo's Bizarre Adventure - Straizo
- JoJo's Bizarre Adventure: Stardust Crusaders - Narrator
- Journey to the Heart of the World - Louis
- Karas - Kamaitachi
- Kaze no Yojimbo - Arms Dealer, Hunter, Officer, Sugino
- Knights of Sidonia - Trainee
- Kurogane Communication - Cleric
- Kyo Kara Maoh! - Belar
- Last Exile - Casino Royale Dealer, Cicada, Goliath XO, Guild Watcher #3, Silvana Observation Deck Officer, Sunny Boy
- Lensman - Thorndyke
- Little Women - Additional Voices
- Lunar Legend Tsukihime - Male Student, Ride Attendant
- Macron 1 - Jet
- Mahoromatic: Something More Beautiful - Detective, Management Announcer, Management Board Member, Management Employee, Newscaster A, Teacher
- Mars Daybreak - Ginpetit
- Mega Man Star Force - Deranged Movie Star
- The Melody of Oblivion - Detective A, Elan Vital, Male Secretary, Man A, Miri's Butler, Vice Mayor
- Mirage of Blaze - Ujimasa Hojyo
- Mobile Suit Gundam: The Movie Trilogy - Narrator, Cain Sohn, Chris
- Monster - Peter Capek
- Mouse - Scientist, Woof, Policeman
- Naruto - Hoki, Tekka Uchiha
- New Getter Robo - Villager
- Nightwalker - Koji Ozaki
- Nodame Cantabile - Kozou Etou, Seiichirou Miyoshi
- Nura: Rise of the Yokai Clan - Muchi
- Otogi Zoshi - Onmyoji, Tabigeinin A
- Outlaw Star - Norman Starwind, Prison Security System, Space Race Announcer, Tendo King's Overseer
- Overman King Gainer - Toun
- Paranoia Agent - Hiranuma
- Phantom Investigators - Daemona's Dad
- Phantom the Animation - Master Scythe
- Phoenix - Kimite (Sun Chapter)
- Planetes - Chieftain, Narrator, Werner Locksmith
- Rozen Maiden - Seal
- Rurouni Kenshin - Sadojima Hoji, Udo Jin-e
- Saint Tail - Policeman, Sayaka's Father
- Saiyuki - Demon, Shikigami User, Thug C
- Samurai Champloo - Ichieimon, Ken, Lord Tamoto, Officer #2
- Samurai Girl Real Bout High School - Mr. Kinomiya, Setsura Kyogoku
- Scrapped Princess - General Peters-Stahl
- Street Fighter Alpha: Generations - Gouken
- Street Fighter IV: The Ties That Bind - Akuma
- Submarine 707R - Ichiro Suzuki
- Tenchi in Tokyo - Hotsuma, Space Police Announcer
- Tenchi Muyo! GXP - Kanemitsu Hirata, Misao Kuramitsu, Azusa Masaki Jurai
- Tenjho Tenge - Tagami
- Tenko and the Guardians of the Magic
- Tokko - Homeless Man, Lab Technician, Security Guard, TV News Reporter
- Trigun - Sheriff's Office Clerk
- Tsukihime, Lunar Legend - Male Student, Ride Attendant
- The Melancholy of Haruhi Suzumiya - Sports Announcer, Mask Merchant
- The Twelve Kingdoms - Gaishi, Ikuta, Sensei Watanabe, Gahou, Shukou
- Vampire Princess Miyu - Galerie Owner, Gas Station Manager, Reporter B, Yasuhiko Tachiki
- Vandread - Pyoro
- Vandread: The Second Stage - Patch, Pyoro
- When They Cry - Ichiro Maebara, Kyousuke Irie
- Witch Hunter Robin - Hattori
- X - Seishirou Sakurazuka
- Yukikaze - Ansel Rombart
- Yu-Gi-Oh! Zexal - Various
- Zatch Bell! - Yopopo, Kikuropu, Cut 'N' Paste
- Zetman - Jiro Nakata
- Zillion - NOZA Computer, Silo Complex Commander, Soldier

=== Animation ===
- The Return of Dogtanian - Dogtanian
- El Chavo - Mr. Beliarge, Manny the Mailman, Mr. Crookley
- Grimm's Fairy Tale Classics - "Briar Rose" - The Prince
- Grimm's Fairy Tale Classics - "King Grizzlebeard" - King Grizzlebeard
- Grimm's Fairy Tale Classics - "Snow White and Rose Red" - Bear
- Lego Friends: Mia's Ranch Romance - Additional Voices
- Maple Town - Mr. Badger
- Noozles - Grandpa Benjamin Brown, Frankie
- Phil's Dance Party - Phil
- The Wisdom of The Gnomes - Pit

=== Live action ===
- Adventures in Voice Acting - Himself
- Big Bad Beetleborgs - Swamp Scumoid, Borgslayer (shared role with Bob Papenbrook)
- Beetleborgs Metallix - Shellator (voice)
- Drunken Master II - Wong Fei-Hung
- Dynamo Duck - Edison, Frostbite, Ivan Tobealonesky, Sean O'Connor
- Everybody Loves Raymond - Event Announcer (uncredited)
- Flipper - Computer Voice
- Hallo Spencer - Kasimir (voice)
- Jake & Blake - Fynk
- Just Shoot Me! - The Egg (computer voice)
- Mad Men - Ring Announcer / Season 4 "The Suitcase" (voice)
- Marseille - Pierre Chasseron
- Mighty Morphin Power Rangers - Baboo (as Colin Phillips), Series Announcer, Pudgy Pig, Grumble Bee (2nd voice), Lizzinator, Trumpet Top, Terror Blossom, Beamcaster, Evil Bookula (voices, all minus Baboo are uncredited)
- Power Rangers Zeo - Baboo, Video Vulture, Googleheimer (the Toy Robot), "Hosehead", Midas Monster (voices, all minus Baboo uncredited)
- Power Rangers Turbo - Mr Goorific (voice, uncredited)
- Power Rangers in Space - Termitus (voice, uncredited)
- Power Rangers Lost Galaxy - Gasser (uncredited), Magnetox (voices)
- Power Rangers: Lightspeed Rescue - Trifire (voice)
- Power Rangers: Time Force - Black Knight (uncredited), Commandocon (voices)
- Power Rangers Wild Force - 2nd Narrator (uncredited), Vacuum Cleaner Org, Helicos (as David J. Mallow), Announcer (voices)
- Roseanne - Radio Voice
- Versus - Glasses
- Violetta - Ramallo (voice: English)
- VR Troopers - Air Stryker, Toxoid, Fistbot, Magician, Irradiator, Series Announcer
- World Series of Poker - The Discovery Channel
- Zeiram 2 - Bob (voice)

=== Films ===
- A Martian Christmas - VOX, Shopper
- An American Tail: The Treasure of Manhattan Island - Looper
- Castle in the Sky - Louis (original English dub)
- Cromartie High - The Movie - Masa (voice)
- Arthur's Missing Pal - TV Announcer
- Blood: The Last Vampire - Various
- Dawn of the Dead - Zombie Vocal EFX (uncredited)
- Digimon: The Movie - Angemon/Seraphimon, Upamon
- Digimon Adventure tri. - Angemon
- Dive Olly Dive and the Pirate Treasure - Pirate Captain
- Fist of the North Star - Heart (Streamline dub)
- First Snow - Radio Announcer (voice, uncredited)
- FernGully: The Last Rainforest - Additional Voice
- Forest Warrior - Bear Vocal Effects (uncredited)
- The Happy Cricket - Buffuno
- Kiki's Delivery Service - Dirigible Captain (Streamline Dub)
- Krippendorf's Tribe - Newscaster (voice, uncredited)
- Lensman: Secret of the Lens - Thorndyke
- Metropolis - Pero
- Mobile Suit Gundam F91 - Cain Sohn, Chris
- Nixon - Newscaster (voice, uncredited)
- Redline - Track Announcer
- 'Til There Was You - Newscaster (voice, uncredited)
- Turbulence - Autopilot Voice (uncredited)
- The Waterboy - Sports Announcer (voice, uncredited)
- The L.A. Riot Spectacular - Newscaster (voice, uncredited)
- The Dragon That Wasn't (Or Was He?) - Mr. Tusker, Doctor Lockjaw, Newscaster (English dub)
- The Hungover Games - Talking Jay
- The Unborn - Devil Baby Vocal EFX (uncredited)
- John Carpenter's Vampires - Vampire Vocal EFX (uncredited)
- Windaria - Lunarian Court Member

=== Video games ===
- Battleship - Master Chief Petty Officer Scott Vickers, Lt. Commander Steve Metcalfe
- Bleach: The 3rd Phantom - Seigen Suzunami
- Call of Duty 4: Modern Warfare - "Baseplate"
- Call of Duty: Black Ops - President Richard Nixon
- Defiance - Weston Marx, Votan Rebel, Hammerhead Gretch
- Diablo III - Gharbad, Raziel the Dark One, Ghezrim, Serpent Magus, Goz' Turr the Torturer
- Digimon Rumble Arena - Seraphimon
- Dirge of Cerberus: Final Fantasy VII - Incidental characters
- Final Fantasy Crystal Chronicles: The Crystal Bearers - Additional voices
- Hearthstone - The mistcaller, Sea Reaver, Spawn of Shadows, Mogor's Champion, Mukla's Champion
- Heroes of the Storm - Dragon Knight, Undead Miner
- I Love Bees - Herzog
- Klonoa - Joker, Royal Guard
- Marvel vs. Capcom 3 - Akuma
- Might and Magic: World of Xeen - Additional Voices
- Resident Evil 5 - HQ
- Resident Evil 6 - HQ
- Resistance 3 - Lester
- Samurai Champloo: Sidetracked - Hanaoka
- Space Siege - Dr. Edward DeSoto
- Street Fighter series - Akuma, Oni
- Ultimate Marvel vs. Capcom 3 - Akuma
- Warcraft series - Various to include: Azgalor, Brutallus, Gortok Palehoof, Lor'Themar Theron, Varkul the Unrelenting, Tortolla, Xevozz, Thermaplugg, Saurok, Verming, Thalnos, Amber Monster, Chief Salyis, Nhallish

=== Toy voice work ===
- Sonic Slam
- WWF Smackdown Megaphone
- Big Rig Buddies - Mattel
- Chameleon Crunch Game - Mattel
- Hot Wheels® Car Maker - Mattel
- Hot Wheels® K.I.T.T. Knight Industries Two Thousand - Knight Rider 30th Anniversary Special Edition

=== Audio book narration ===
- The Commission
- Rich Dad's Increase Your Financial IQ
- Rich Dad's Advanced Guide to Real Estate Investing
- Rich Dad's Guide to the ABC's of Property Management
- Rich Dad's Conspiracy of the Rich
- The Political Fix
- The Problem with Sudden Dance
- Lies Chelsea Handler Told Me
- Secret Agent X: "The Torture Trust" - RadioArchives.com
- So Good They Can't Ignore You - Why Skills Trump Passion in the Quest for Work You Love
- Word of Mouth Marketing: How Smart Companies Get People Talking
- The Kid: The Immortal Life of Ted Williams

== ADR staff ==
=== Writer/adapter ===
- Adventures on Rainbow Pond - Harmony Gold
- Grimm's Fairy Tale Classics
- The Littl' Bits
- Maple Town Stories
- Maya the Bee
- Noozles
- Ox Tales
- The Return of Dogtanian
- Saban's Adventures of Peter Pan
- Saban's Adventures of Pinocchio
- Saban's Adventures of the Little Mermaid
- Saban's Tales of Little Women
- Saban's The Adventures of Tom Sawyer
- Saban's Gulliver's Travels
- Samurai Pizza Cats
- Sandokan (1992 animated series - BRB International)
- Swiss Family Robinson
- The Wisdom of The Gnomes
- The Hallo Spencer Show
- Wowser

=== Director ===
- Adventures on Rainbow Pond - Co-director
- Button Nose - ADR Director
- Eagle Riders - Co-director
- Honeybee Hutch - Voice Director
- Journey to the Heart of the World - Co-director
- Noozles - Co-director
- Saban's Tales of Little Women - Co-director
- Tenchi in Tokyo Co-director
- Wisdom of the Gnomes - Co-director
- The Return of Dogtanian - Co-director

=== Looping ===
- Air Force One
- Beauty and the Beast
- Breaking Bad
- Dark Water
- Dawn of the Dead
- ER
- First Snow
- Ghosts of Mars
- Life-Size
- Lois & Clark: The New Adventures of Superman
- Mad Men
- My Favorite Martian
- My So-Called Life
- S1m0ne
- Nixon
- Jerry Maguire
- Mystery Alaska
- 'Til There Was You
- Turbulence
- The Waterboy
- Eraser
- Relativity
- Sisters
- The Siege
- The Heist - (1989 TV Movie)
- The Adventures of Brisco County, Jr.
- Krippendorf's Tribe
- John Carpenter's Vampires
- Rocky and Bullwinkle
- BASEketball - Bob Costas soundalike

=== Radio ===
- KFMG-FM - Des Moines, Iowa
- KUDL-FM - Kansas City, Missouri
- WQIV-FM - New York, New York
- WKTU-FM - New York, New York
- WTFM-FM - New York, New York
- Cutler Comedy Network

=== Other crew ===
- The Unborn - Vocal Effects
