= The Return of Dogtanian =

Animated television series

- Title card
- Spanish: El retorno de D'Artacán
- Genre: Animation, action, comedy-drama, fantasy
- Based on: The Vicomte of Bragelonne: Ten Years Later by Alexandre Dumas
- Developed by: Claudio Biern Boyd
- Theme music composer: Guido & Maurizio De Angelis
- Composer: Jordi Doncos
- Countries of origin: Spain; United Kingdom
- Original language: Spanish
- No. of episodes: 26

Production
- Producer: Olivia Borricón
- Running time: 25 minutes
- Production companies: BRB Internacional; Televisión Española; Thames Television
- Budget: 650 million ₧

Original release
- Network: TVE1
- Release: 1989

Related
- Dogtanian and the Three Muskehounds

The Return of Dogtanian (Spanish: El retorno de D'Artacán) is a 1989 Spanish–British children's animated television series, sequel to the 1981 series Dogtanian and the Three Muskehounds, that continues the classic 1844 Alexandre Dumas story of d'Artagnan and The Three Musketeers. It was produced by Spanish studio BRB Internacional, Televisión Española and Thames Television with animation of Wang Film Productions.

In 1995, BRB Internacional released a television film edited from the series entitled Dogtanian: One For All and All For One.

== Production ==
In 1989 The Return of Dogtanian was produced by BRB Internacional, Televisión Española and Thames Television with animation of Wang Film Productions. Like the first series, 26 episodes were produced. Its budget was 650 million pesetas (€3.9 million).

The story is loosely based on the novel The Vicomte of Bragelonne: Ten Years Later also by Alexandre Dumas, itself building on the myth of The Man in the Iron Mask. It picks up ten years after the first series story ends, with Dogtanian and Juliette now married and living together on the outskirts of Paris with their two children, Philippe and Fleur. The Muskehounds are reunited by Queen Anne of Austria when her husband starts acting suspiciously. Cardinal Richelieu is still featured, along with Milady and Widimer still loyal to him.

Dave Mallow and Doug Stone, who co-adapted the original scripts to English and co-directed, took over as the voices of Dogtanian, and Porthos, respectively. As it was animated in Taiwan by Wang Film Productions, Nippon Animation, the Japanese studio which animated the first series, was not involved in the sequel, as BRB had started finding new partners outside Japan, due to the high costs caused by the Japanese asset price bubble.

== Cast ==
- Aramis – Eddie Frierson
- Juliette – Rebecca Forstadt
- Pip – Steve Kramer
- Widimer – Mike Reynolds
- Cardinal Richelieu – Kerrigan Mahan (ep. 1-9), Dan Woren (ep. 10-26)
- Milady – Edie Mirman
- Queen Anne – Robin Levenson
- King Louis – Simon Prescott
- Narrator – Michael McConnohie
- Dogtanian – Dave Mallow
- Porthos – Doug Stone
- Athos – Michael Sorich
- Beajeaux – Steve Bulen
- Elexy – Robert Axelrod
- Philippe – Brianne Siddall
- Planchet – Milton James
- Blancbec – Simon Prescott

== Episode list ==
1. "At France's Service"
2. "In Paris Again"
3. "Bad News"
4. "The Gold Muzzle"
5. "The Rescue Mission"
6. "A Secret Forever"
7. "The Magician's Cave"
8. "The King Been Poisoned"
9. "A Special Visit"
10. "Change of Plans"
11. "The Impostor"
12. "One More in the Group"
13. "Trapped by Blanbec"
14. "A Surprise for Richelieu"
15. "Pedrigreen Hood"
16. "Widimer Complicates Things"
17. "The Best Archer"
18. "Rescuing Dogtanian"
19. "The King's Cousin"
20. "A Robbery in the Dance"
21. "The Black Rose"
22. "A Terrific Surprise"
23. "Fleur Kidnapping"
24. "Where is Fleur?"
25. "The Rescue of Fleur"
26. "Tréville's Successor"

== Television film ==
In 1995, BRB Internacional released a television film edited from the series entitled Dogtanian: One For All and All For One, with completely different voice actors and a few name changes from the original series.

== Home media ==
=== DVD releases ===
The Return of Dogtanian was only released as a box-set and not as individual volumes. There are 4 disks in the set. Unlike the first series which is in Region 0 format, the second series was released in Region 2 format. The DVD of the TV film was also released in Region 0.

- The television films Dogtanian: Special and Dogtanian: One For All And All For One: 26 July 2004.
- Dogtanian – The Complete Second Series Boxset: 4 July 2005.

In November 2010, a version that contains both series and both television films was released exclusively for HMV. Later, the complete box set was made available at other retailers.

=== VOD ===
The series can be found on different platforms such as YouTube and Netflix.
