= Casshan: Robot Hunter =

Original video animation

ロボット・ハンター・キャシャーン / キャシャーン (Robot Hunter Casshern / Casshan)
- Genre: Adventure, science fiction, superhero
- Created by: Tatsunoko Production
- Original video animation
- Directed by: Hiroyuki Fukushima; Masashi Abe; Takashi Watanabe
- Produced by: Hiroshi Kimura; Hirotoshi Okura; Takashi Yoshida
- Written by: Emu Arii; Hideki Kakinuma; Hiroyuki Fukushima; Shō Aikawa
- Music by: Michiru Ōshima
- Studio: Tatsunoko Production
- Licensed by: UK: Manga Entertainment; US: Discotek Media
- Released: August 21, 1993 – February 21, 1994
- Runtime: 30 minutes (each)
- Episodes: 4
- Anime film

Casshan: Robot Hunter (American film adaptation)
- Directed by: Carl Macek
- Written by: Michelle Head
- Studio: Harmony Gold USA (adaptation)
- Released: 1995
- Runtime: 100 minutes

Casshan: Robot Hunter, known in Japan as Robot Hunter Casshern (ロボット・ハンター・キャシャーン, Robotto Hantā Kyashān) or simply Casshern (キャシャーン, Kyashān; romanized as Casshan in the official logo), is an original video animation (OVA) series that was directed by Hiroyuki Fukushima and produced by Tatsunoko Production, made in commemoration of the studio's 30th anniversary. The OVA was later adapted into an English-language dubbed film directed by Carl Macek. This series is based on Tatsunoko Productions' 1973 anime series Neo-Human Casshern.

== Premise ==
Enslaved by an army of rebellious super-robots originally designed to help civilization avert a complete ecological cataclysm, mankind's only hope is Casshan, a legendary hero who wages a solitary war to defeat the Neoroids and restore the Earth to its rightful order. Casshan's father is the scientist who engineered the race of super androids now threatening to destroy all of mankind. On a crusade to save humankind and clear his father's name, Casshan sacrifices his own humanity in order to attain the powers he needs. Haunted by the memories of his murdered mother and forced to deal with a super robot that has absorbed the consciousness of his father, Casshan must put aside his own emotions and fight to preserve the survival of the human race.

== Cast ==
=== Japanese cast ===
- Takeshi Kusao as Tetsuya Azuma / Casshan
- Yumi Tōma as Luna Kozuki
- Hirohiko Kakegawa as Admiral Montgomery Dr. Lester
- Ikuya Sawaki as Narrator
- Issei Futamata as Akbone
- Isshin Chiba as Operator
- Jun'ichi Sugawara as Barashin
- Jūrōta Kosugi as Commander Tork
- Keaton Yamada as Dr. Kotaro Azuma
- Kenichi Ogata as Elder Asari
- Kenji Utsumi as Buraiking Boss (Black King Boss in the dub)
- Masaki Aizawa as Information Robot
- Nobuo Tobita as Nyman
- Sanae Takagi as Midori Azuma
- Toshiyuki Morikawa as Pilot
- Wataru Takagi as Executive Officer
- Yuri Amano as Sagria

=== English cast ===
- Alexandra Kenworthy as Narrator
- Ardwight Chamberlain
- Catherine Battistone as Neoroid Commander
- Eddie Frierson
- Edie Mirman as Luna Kozuki
- Jeff Winkless as Black King / Android BK-1
- Kerrigan Mahan
- Kirk Thornton as unnamed prisoner who betrays Luna in the first episode
- Melanie MacQueen
- Michael Forest as Adm. Rudolph
- Michael McConnohie
- Michael Reynolds
- Michael Sorich
- Richard Allen
- Richard Cansino
- Simon Prescott
- Stephen Apostolina
- Steve Bulen as Casshan / Tetsuya Azuma
- Steve Kramer as Professor Hannibal

== Release ==
Casshan: Robot Hunter was originally released as a four-volume OVA series in Japan between August 21, 1993, and February 21, 1994. The American publisher Harmony Gold USA edited the four episodes into a single feature film for its English-language debut in 1995. In 2003, ADV Films re-released the four-episode series on DVD. The title sequence for the OVA translates the katakana "キャシャーン" as "Casshan". This was repeated in the American adaptation by Harmony Gold.

No.	Title	Original release date
1	"Return From The Myth"; Transliteration: "Shinwa kara no Kikan" (Japanese: 第1話: 神話からの帰還)	August 21, 1993
After defeating a group of robots in battle at an abandoned amusement park, a human resistance fighter slips inside Castle Promise, a massive robot-manufacturing facility. Luna Kozuki plans a revolt with the human workers; that night she sees Lucky and her old lover, Tetsuya Azuma. The next day, the rebels are betrayed by a fellow prisoner who was promised freedom, but the collaborator is killed and Luna is captured. Akubon plans to publicly execute her as if she were Casshan, to break the people's spirit, but the real Casshan saves Luna and kills Akubon, though the Black King escapes.
2	"Journey to the Past"; Transliteration: "Kako e no Tabidachi" (Japanese: 第2話: 過去への旅立ち)	October 21, 1993
Luna leaves to deliver weapon plans to Admiral Rudolph, the leader of the human forces. Her helicopter is shot down and crashes, and the pilot sacrifices himself to allow Luna to escape a robot scout team. Luna is able to meet with Casshan and Friender, and finds that Casshan is struggling with his lack of humanity while also suffering physical weakness from the battles. The three are attacked by a robot army and Casshan tells Luna to flee but she is unable to leave Casshan.
3	"Blitz on the Bridge"; Transliteration: "Kōtetsu no Senjō" (Japanese: 第3話: 鋼鉄の戦場)	December 21, 1993
The Black King has a bridge repaired, while the human resistance plans to bomb the bridge when the enemy forces cross it. Meanwhile, Casshan and Luna are ambushed by robot scouts, which Casshan and Friender defeat; Casshan hacks into a scout and learns the Black King is initiating the Sigma Project to replace humans with eco-friendly androids. While struggling with what to do, Casshan's mother appears to him and tells him to stop the Black King. Luna meets up with the resistance and Casshan stops them as the train crosses the bridge, but immediately regrets it. The bomb explodes too late, but Casshan redeems himself by destroying the train and vows to never again lose his way.
4	"The Reviver"; Transliteration: "Fukkatsu no Kyashān" (Japanese: 第4話: 復活のキャシャーン)	February 21, 1994
Using the weapon plans, the human resistance make a large number of MF guns and attack the robot army. Victory seems at hand but Casshan's mother warns that the Black King is biding his time. Luna tries to comfort Casshan who rebuffs her, and leaves with Friender to battle the Black King. The Black King launches his offensive and gains control of the world's nuclear missiles. Friender sacrifices himself during a battle and Casshan is shot by a female robot commander who realizes he was more than human or machine. Casshan fights the Black King and – after the Black King claims to possess his father's soul – gathers enough strength to kill the Black King, dying himself afterwards. A failsafe shuts down all the other robots, securing human victory and a future for Luna.

== Reception ==
Helen McCarthy praised the work of top designer Yasuomi Umetsu and said that anime "holds your attention with interesting concept and designs". THEM Anime Reviews gave a rating of one out of five and called the writing terrible, the soundtrack melodramatic and irritating, and the animation poor and choppy.
