= Steve Bulen =

American actor

- Born: United States
- Other names: Steve Buelen; Steve Bulin; Stevie Beeline; Scott Ponsov
- Occupation: Voice actor
- Years active: 1980–present
- Notable work: Giant Robo; The Castle of Cagliostro; Lupin the 3rd: The Mystery of Mamo; Trigun

Steve Bulen is an American voice actor.

Bulen has been doing voices for many animated films and television shows for Walt Disney Animation Studios and Hanna-Barbera as well several video games and anime titles such as Doomed Megalopolis, Giant Robo, Outlaw Star, Street Fighter II V and Rave Master.

He has also worked as looping director on several feature films and wrote several episodes of Bob in a Bottle, Maya the Bee, Jungle Tales, Bumpety Boo, Saban's Adventures of Pinocchio, The Littl' Bits and Samurai Pizza Cats.

He also goes under the names Steve Buelen, Steve Bulin, Stevie Beeline, and Scott Ponsov.

== Dubbing roles ==
=== Animation dubbing ===
- 3×3 Eyes - Steve Long, Hotel Manager
- 8 Man After - Hazama Itsuro/8 Man
- Armageddon - Various
- Armitage III - Robot Salesman
- Armitage III Polymatrix - Various
- Babel II - Koichi/Babel II
- Black Magic M-66 - Commando
- Carried by the Wind: Tsukikage Ran - Ukiya-tei Housemaster
- Casshan: Robot Hunter - Casshan / Tetsuya Azuma
- The Castle of Cagliostro - Daisuke Jigen (MGM version)
- Code Geass: Lelouch of the Rebellion - Taizou Kirihara
- Crimson Wolf - Brukodan's brother; Assassin
- Crying Freeman - Yo Hinomura/Crying Freeman/Ron Tayan
- The Dirty Pair's Affair on Nolandia - Officer; Dr. Kashida
- Doomed Megalopolis - Professor Terada
- Dragon Century
- Dragon Slayer - Roe
- Fight! Iczer-One - Commander
- Fist of the North Star movie - Wise Man
- Ghost in the Shell - Section 9 Staff Cyberneticist, Coroner
- Ghost in the Shell: Stand Alone Complex - Fukami
- Giant Robo - Professor Go Gakujin
- Honeybee Hutch - Additional Voices
- The Legend of Black Heaven - Fomalhaut
- Lily C.A.T. - Morgan W. Scott
- Lupin III: The Mystery of Mamo - Daisuke Jigen
- Lupin III: Tales of the Wolf - Daisuke Jigen
- Mobile Suit Gundam: The Movie Trilogy - General Elron, Lt. Seki
- Nadia: The Secret of Blue Water (original dub) - Gargoyle
- Orguss 02 - Minister Kerachi
- Outlanders - Progress (L.A. Hero Dub)
- Outlaw Star - Leilong/Shimi
- Rave Master - Gale Glory
- The Return of Dogtanian - Count Beajeaux
- Space Adventure Cobra - Additional Voices
- Space Adventure Cobra: The Movie - Sheriff
- Street Fighter II V - Donu
- Street Fighter II: The Animated Movie - Investigators
- Tekkaman Blade - Balzac
- Trigun - Midvalley the Hornfreak
- Twilight of the Dark Master - Kudo
- The Wings of Honneamise - General Khaidenn
- Vampire Hunter D - Greco
- Zillion: Burning Night - Gardok Odama

== Filmography ==
=== Animation ===
- Batman: The Animated Series - Officer
- Challenge of the GoBots - Additional Voices
- Chucklewood Critters - Franklin
- Creepy Crawlers - Additional Voices
- DuckTales - Additional Voices
- DuckTales the Movie: Treasure of the Lost Lamp - Additional Voices
- Iznogoud - Additional Voices
- Jin Jin and the Panda Patrol - Ponurak
- The Little Mermaid - Additional Voices
- The Little Polar Bear - Additional Voices
- Mulan - Shang's Troops
- Kung Fu Panda - Anvil Of Heaven 2
- Popeye and Son - Additional Voices
- Pound Puppies - Mr. Simon, Rocky, Attorney
- Rockin' with Judy Jetson - Additional Voices
- The Super Powers Team: Galactic Guardians - Additional Voices
- The Transformers - Sureshot, Searchlight, Onslaught
- Tugger: The Jeep 4x4 Who Wanted to Fly - Towerman, Crewman 3
- Willy Fog 2 - Rigadon
- The Wind in the Willows: The Movie - Mole (American dub)

=== Live-action ===
- Mrs. Munck - Quigley (voice)
- My Name Is Modesty: A Modesty Blaise Adventure - Additional Voices
- Pinocchio - First Doctor (voice)
- Shaolin Soccer - Fung (voice)
- Twin Dragons - Dubbing Voices
- The White Shadow - Man at Door

=== Video games ===
- Battlezone - Various
- Codename: Panzers Phase Two - James Barnes
- Groove Adventure Rave: Fighting Live - Gale Glory
- Medal of Honor: Allied Assault - Additional Voices
- Medal of Honor: Frontline - Captain
- Might and Magic: World of Xeen - Various
- Mission Impossible: Operation Surma - Director Swanbeck, Vasyl Berkut
- Quest for Glory V: Dragon Fire - Abdim, Bruno, Cerberus 2, Erasmus/Minos
- Rave Master: Special Attack Force - Gale Glory
- Rugrats: Search for Reptar - Additional Voices
- Star Trek: Judgment Rites - Eaderic Kamend, Kurt Nielsen
- Star Trek: 25th Anniversary Enhanced - Elasi Cereth, Lt. Ferris, Captain Patterson

== Staff work ==
- Bob in a Bottle - Writer
- Bumpety Boo - Writer
- Dawson's Creek - Group ADR Coordinator
- Happy, Texas - ADR Voice
- Jungle Tales - Writer
- The Littl' Bits - Writer
- Maya the Bee - Writer
- The Pie in the Sky - ADR Loop Group
- Profile for Murder - ADR Voice
- The Road to El Dorado - ADR Loop Group
- RocketMan - ADR Loop Group
- Saban's Adventures of Pinocchio - Writer
- Samurai Pizza Cats - Writer
- Shrek - ADR Loop Group
- Turner & Hooch - ADR Voice Group
- The Twilight of the Golds - ADR Loop Group
- The Zone - Additional Voice
