= Jin Jin and the Panda Patrol =

- Created by: Saban Entertainment
- Written by: Ann Anderson; Dayna Barron; Robert V. Barron; Rebecca Forstadt; Michael McConnohie; Mike Reynolds; Mark Ryan; Doug Stone; Jeff Winkless
- Voices of: Susan Blu; Steve Bulen; Barbara Goodson; Steve Kramer; Dave Mallow; Michael McConnohie; Michael Sorich
- Composers: Shuki Levy; Haim Saban
- Countries of origin: United States; China
- Original language: English
- No. of seasons: 1
- No. of episodes: 26

Production
- Production companies: Saban Entertainment; Beijing Golden Panda Animation Company

Original release
- Release: May 6, 1994

Jin Jin and the Panda Patrol (Chinese: 熊猫京京; pinyin: Xióngmāo jīng jīng) is a 1994 animated TV series created by Beijing Golden Panda Animation Company and dubbed by Saban Entertainment. Ownership of the series passed to Disney in 2001 when Disney acquired Fox Kids Worldwide, which also includes Saban Entertainment.

== Plot ==
Jin Jin is a giant panda living in Pandaland. His home ends up destroyed by Grimster, a henchman of the evil Dr. Mania. Dr. Mania plans to regress the Earth back to its primitive times before humans had developed over parts of nature. Now Jin Jin travels to stop the plot of Dr. Maniac, find the New Pandaland, and even save some endangered species along the way.

== Characters ==
- Jin Jin (voiced by Barbara Goodson) – The main protagonist of the series. Jin Jin is a giant panda from Pandaland who possesses Panda-Power. His home ends up destroyed by Grimster and Jin Jin ends up separated from his family. Jin Jin is on a journey to find the New Pandaland while evading the minions of Dr. Mania.
- Rudy Redbone (voiced by Michael Sorich) – A karate dog who befriends Jin Jin.
- Benji (voiced by Susan Blu) – A performing monkey with a silly personality who befriends Jin Jin.
- Squawk (voiced by Dave Mallow) – A parrot agent who befriends Jin Jin.
- Dr. Mania (voiced by Michael Sorich) – The primary antagonist of the series. He is a mad scientist with claws who plans to regress the Earth back to its primitive times. The narrator states that some of Dr. Mania's accomplishments involve crossing a giraffe with a German Shepherd to make a 6 story watchdog, a bumblebee with a doorbell to make a "humdinger", and a parrot with a Siberian tiger in which the narrator didn't know what to call it and said "but when it talked, you'd better listen". Due to Jin Jin thwarting his plans and wanting to know about his Panda-Power, Dr. Mania ends up placing a bounty on Jin Jin in order to get rid of him and harness his Panda-Power.
  - Grimster (voiced by Steve Bulen) – An ape-like bounty hunter that works as Dr. Mania's henchman. He was responsible for accidentally destroying Pandaland.
  - Hopper (voiced by Michael McConnohie) – A "manhopper" that was created by Dr. Mania who used a machine and chemicals on a grasshopper. He is an expert in all the martial arts and the master of every weapon known to mankind.
  - Leon - Dr. Mania's manservant.
- Narrator (voiced by Steve Kramer) - An unseen narrator who narrates Jin Jin's adventures. He would often make comments about certain things and do commentary.

== Episodes ==
1. "Panda-Manium" – When Pandaland ends up accidentally burned to the ground by Grimster, Jin Jin ends up going on a quest to stop Dr. Mania and reunite with his family in the new Pandaland.
2. "Un-Bear-Able!" – When fleeing from Grimster and a hunter named Nestor, Jin Jin ends up being saved by Nestor's daughter Chloe.
3. "Dog-Gone Fun!" – Dr. Mania offers a reward for the capture of Jin Jin. Bugsy Wolf and Mugsy Wolf end up capturing Jin Jin only for him to be saved by Rudy Redbone. Following the Wolf Brothers failure, Dr. Mania creates Hopper to help capture Jin Jin.
4. "Funky Monkey Business" – Jin Jin and Rudy Redbone put on a martial arts show in the city in order to raise money to find Pandaland. They meet Benji who is working for Hopper posing as an East-Indian man named Sikum who has his first encounter with Grimster. Dr. Mania clears things up and orders them to get Jin Jin.
5. "All's Well That Ends Up In The Well!" – Jin Jin and Benji end up in a well as a fox named Randall wonders how to get Jin Jin out so that he can collect his reward from Dr. Mania after finding a leaflet dropped by Hopper.
6. "Tomb Much to Bear!" – While inside a tomb, Jin Jin and Benji end up pursued by Hopper. They end up working to avoid Hopper.
7. "No Zoos Is Good Zoos!" – Jin Jin and Benji arrive at the city zoo as they learn about it from a squirrel named Squiggles as she suggests that they move in while getting past the ticket taker Mr. Rudolph. Once inside, they meet some zoo animals that Squiggles knows including a polar bear named Lenia who notes that the animals aren't happy. Meanwhile, Hopper follows Jin Jin and poses as a journalist to get in.
8. "Sand, Sand, Everywhere Sand!" – Hopper had secretly snuck a panda detector into Jin Jin's food in the last episode as he and Grimster plans to track down Jin Jin and find out where he is. They find Jin Jin and Benji nearby and pose as a professor and his driver where they are pursued by a parrot named Squawk who rescues them. They soon drive through a desert as Grimster and Hopper are not far behind.
9. "Going Batty!" – Jin Jin, Benji, and Squawk get trapped in a cave-in as they explore the cave. They encounter a group of bats led by King Batolia as General Nightflyer allows them to hear them out. Hopper catches up to them and lies that Jin Jin, Benji, and Squawk are helping to conquer the Bat Kingdom on Dr. Mania's behalf. With advice from General Nightflyer who argues with Lord Wingsly, Jin Jin and his friends must prove that they are not associated with Dr. Mania.
10. "Eggs-Zactly or An Extinct Possibility" – Jin Jin, Benji, and Squawk arrive in a swamp where there is no sign of Grimster and Hopper. Upon arriving at a crossroads, they spin the sign and take a path through the swamp where they encounter a Brontosaurus named Emily who saves them from quicksand and takes them through the swamp. Grimster and Hopper follow Jin Jin into the swamp where Emily saves them from a giant snake. They take advantage of her kindness and end up trying to take her eggs.
11. "I Gotta Chameleon Of Them!" – Jin Jin, Benji, and Squawk arrive at an ancient city where they meet a chameleon named Flexor who allows them to spend the night. They work to harvest the water supply in order to restore the city. Though Jin Jin, Benji, Squawk, and Flexor also work to work the water pump beneath the ancient city while having to contend with Grimster and Hopper.
12. "Accidentally, on Porpoise!" – Jin Jin, Benji, and Squawk follow a stream and they build a raft to sail the ocean by putting together whatever they can put together at an old logging camp. Once that is done, they cross the ocean and meet a porpoise named Jasper. Meanwhile, Dr. Mania creates a panda-seeking robotic fishasaurus to follow Jin Jin.
13. "The Three Faces of Eve-il" – After Hopper successfully captured Jin Jin and Benji, he flies them to Dr. Mania's island where they meet the shapeshifting Eve who shows them around the compound dedicated by Dr. Mania. Squawks finally catches up to Jin Jin and Benji as he plans to trick Eve with help from the Bat Sisters before Dr. Mania can experiment on them.
14. "On the Horns of a Dilemma" – After escaping from Dr. Mania's lair, Jin Jin, Benji, and Squawk run into a gorilla named Bruiser who has them pick flowers to pay off a fine for harvesting some fruit. They are unaware that Bruiser works for a man named Jacques for their smuggling activity as Dr. Mania sends Grimster and Hopper to him. It is here where Jin Jin and Benji reunites with Rudy who has been enslaved by Jacques.
15. "All Aboard for Trouble" – Following their escape from Jacques' compound, Jin Jin, Rudy, Benji, and Squawk hide in some crates on the beach as Grimster and Hopper look for them. Jacques and his henchmen arrive at the sight of the crates as Grimster and Hopper flee. When the crates are unloaded from the ship, Jin Jin and his friends work to avoid Jacques' henchman as Grimster and Hopper catch up to them.
16. "Here's Hopping!" – Parachuting on an island, Jin Jin, Benji, and Squawks find the local natives who are harassing the kangaroos. Upon Jin Jin falling on the witch doctor, the natives mistake him for an evil spirit until he shows off his Panda-Power at the advice of Benji. Jin Jin, Benji, and Squawks head to a canyon to bring the rare blackberries in order to make peace between the kangaroos and the natives. Meanwhile, Dr. Mania threatens to shrink Grimster and Hopper if they fail again.
17. "Just Hangin 'Around" – With the natives still wanting Jin Jin around, he has successfully made peace between them and the kangaroos. Meanwhile, Grimster and Hopper entice the witch doctor in their latest plot to capture Jin Jin.
18. "Stuffin' Nonsense" – Following Jin Jin, Benji, and Squawk to a tropical town, Grimster and Hopper chase after them. Rudy works to find Grimster and Hopper in order to get caught up with Jin Jin. As both parties arrive at a restaurant, Jin Jin's group avoids them and hide out in a toy store. It is here that Jin Jin, Benji, and Squawks are mistaking for real toys and are taken home by different people.
19. "Bear, Bear, Who's Got the Bear?" – With Jin Jin still in the possession of Aunt Agatha and her niece Beatrice, he reunites with Rudy as Jin Jin still plans to find the new Pandaland. Grimster and Hopper work on their next plot by posing as members of the International Zoo which doesn't go well. Not wanting Jin Jin to be harmed if any hired help is enlisted, Dr. Mania orders Grimster and Hopper to get Jin Jin through whatever way possible.
20. "Bearly Visible" – After Beatrice helps tend to Jin Jin's injuries following Grimster and Hopper's attempt to catch him, Beatrice tests a vanishing syrup that turns anything invisible on a flower pot and herself. The next day, Jin Jin works to hide the vanishing syrup before it can fall in the wrong hands. He ends up using it on himself when he gets chased by Grimster and Hopper.
21. "It's in the Bag!" – Beatrice rides back to her mansion on Steed as she meets Squawk and Benji. Grimster and Hopper use the vanishing syrup to capture Jin Jin causing trouble for Rudy as they plan to force Beatrice to give them the vanishing syrup formula so that it can be handed over to Dr. Mania. Now Rudy, Benji, and Squawk must rescue Jin Jin and keep the vanishing syrup formula from falling into Dr. Mania's hands.
22. "Two Bears Too Many" – Jin Jin, Rudy, Benji, Squawk, and Beatrice arrive at the Ringding Brothers Circus that is lacking some new acts. They help the ringmaster Phillip put on a show with their talents as a black-maned lion named Leo and a grizzly bear named Grizzly get jealous at his performances. Meanwhile, Grimster and Hopper trace Jin Jin to the circus. Upon meeting Phillip, they try to get Phillip to sell Jin Jin to them.
23. "A Trainful of Trouble" – Dr. Mania finds that Grimster, Hopper, and Leon had accidentally caught Grizzly who was painted as a panda. Meanwhile, Jin Jin, Rudy, Benji, and Hopper are on a circus train to their next location. Hearing about it, Dr. Mania uses a machine to transform Grimster into a replica of Grizzly in his latest plot to capture Jin Jin.
24. "Saved by a Whisker!" – Having escaped from the Ringding Brothers Circus, Jin Jin, Rudy, Benji, and Squawk come across a polar bear named Betty who is being attacked by a bear. Upon saving her, the Panda Patrol is taken on a ship to the arctic so that they can cross the ocean where the new Pandaland is somewhere is across it. They encounter a cat named Whiskers who works for the ship's captain as Grimster and Hopper are not far behind.
25. "We'll Have a Whale of a Time!" – While riding on the back of a blue whale named Blubber, Jin Jin, Rudy, Benji, Squawk, and Betty are pursued by Grimster and Hopper. As Jin Jin's group and Betty enters Blubber's mouth, he takes them underwater as Hopper shoots a tracking device on Blubbler. After some squids help provide cover, they continue to avoid Grimster and Hopper even when they cross the tundra and gain help from Betty's parents.
26. "Home at Last!" – Betty enlists the Imperial Reindeer to rescue an amnesiac Jin Jin from Grimster and Hopper. Mr. Svenson enlists a pilot who owes him a favor to get the Panda Patrol to the new Pandaland. Overhearing this, Grimster and Hopper hijack the airplane. When Jin Jin regains his memory, Dr. Mania and Leon take control of the airplane leading to the final battle with Dr. Mania.

== Voice actors ==
- Susan Blu - Benji
- Steve Bulen – Grimster, Fishasaurus (in "Accidentally, on Porpoise!")
- Barbara Goodson – Jin Jin, Squiggles the Squirrel (in "No Zoos is Good Zoos!")
- Steve Kramer – Narrator
- Dave Mallow – Squawk, Mugsy Wolf (in "Dog-Gone Fun!")
- Michael McConnohie - Hopper, Brutus (in "Dog-Gone Fun!"), Mr. Rudolph (in "No Zoos is Good Zoos!"), Tiger (in "No Zoos is Good Zoos!"), Lord Wingsly (in "Going Batty!"), Bear (in "Saved by a Whisker!")
- Michael Sorich - Dr. Mania, Rudy Redbone

=== Additional voices ===
- Ann Anderson -
- Stephen Apostolina - General Nightflyer (in "Going Batty!"; uncredited)
- Robert Axelrod - Professor Know-A-Lot (in "Panda-Manium")
- Bill Capizzi - Jacques (in "On the Horns of a Dilemma", "All Aboard for Trouble"; uncredited)
- Edwin Cook -
- Linda Cook -
- Henry Crowell Jr. - Flexor (in "I Gotta Chameleon of Them!")
- Richard Epcar - Thug (in "Tomb Much to Bear!"; uncredited)
- Melissa Fahn -
- Eddie Frierson - Bugsy Wolf (in "Dog-Gone Fun!")
- Julie Maddalena - Finny (in "Accidentally, on Porpoise!"; uncredited)
- Dave Mallow - Luther (in "Tomb Much to Bear!"; uncredited)
- Brendan McKane -
- Randall Montgomery -
- Sharon Noble -
- Bob Papenbrook - Bruiser (in "On the Horns of a Dilemma", uncredited)
- Mike Reynolds - Eagle (in "Un-Bear-Able!"; uncredited), King Batolia (in "Going Batty!"; uncredited)
- Lia Sargent -
- Joshua Seth - Squeak (in "Panda-Manium!"), Black Panther (in "No Zoos Is Good Zoos!")
- Brianne Siddall - Eagle (in "Un-Bear-Able!")
- Kirk Thornton - Nestor (in "Un-Bear-Able!")
- Jeff Winkless - Lord Wingsley (in "Going Batty!"; uncredited)
- Tom Wyner - Captain (in "Saved by a Whisker!"; uncredited)

== Crew ==
- Ann Anderson - Writer
- Dayna Barron - Writer
- Robert V. Barron – Writer
- Rebecca Forstadt - Writer
- Michael McConnohie - Writer
- Mike Reynolds - Writer
- Eric S. Rollman – Executive Producer
- Mark W. Ryan - Writer
- Doug Stone – Voice Director, Producer, Writer
- David Walsh – ADR Engineer
- Jeff Winkless - Writer
