= Robert V. Barron =

American actor and director (1932–2000)

- Robert V. Barron in Mannix 1968
- Born: Robert V. Barron; December 26, 1932; Charleston, West Virginia, U.S.
- Died: December 1, 2000 (aged 67); Salinas, California, U.S.
- Occupations: Actor, screenwriter, producer, director
- Years active: 1954–1995

Robert V. Barron (December 26, 1932 – December 1, 2000) was an American TV and film director, producer, screenwriter and actor. He was best known for his role as the voice of Admiral Donald Hayes in 1980s animated TV series Robotech, of which he also served as the producer. He is also well known for playing Abraham Lincoln in the 1989 comedy film Bill & Ted's Excellent Adventure.

== Career ==
Barron attended Morris Harvey College in Charleston, West Virginia, and UCLA. He subsequently trained at American Academy of Dramatic Arts in New York City, and at Max Reinhardt Workshop in Los Angeles.

He got his entertainment start in radio, co-producing a two-hour Saturday morning radio program, the "Bop Shop," which aired for two years on radio station WGKV-AM (later WHMS and WXIT, now WSWW (AM)) in his hometown of Charleston, West Virginia.

Before permanently moving to California and beginning his Hollywood work, he spent several years in regional theatre across the U.S. Though he received positive reviews for his performances in such roles as Cyrano de Bergerac, Abe Lincoln In Illinois, Sir Thomas More in A Man for All Seasons, Henry Drummond in Inherit the Wind, and Richard III, he was never offered major roles in films or television.

In Hollywood, he made acting appearances in television shows such as Quantum Leap, Get a Life, Father Dowling Mysteries, and movies such as The Spring and A Dangerous Place. He also wrote episodes of the NBC television western series Bonanza and the CBS-TV western/spy series Wild, Wild West. Perhaps his best-remembered television script was his first, a lighthearted comedy episode of Bonanza, "Hoss and the Leprechauns".

As a writer, Barron drifted into adapting English dubbing scripts of foreign films. American producers began buying successful Japanese animated series and dubbing them in English, and Barron was a pioneer in that industry, which grew rapidly and enormously. He became executive director and story editor for Saban Productions, which in five years became one of the world's largest producers of children's programming, with such shows as X-Men (1992) and Mighty Morphin Power Rangers (1993).

He also made appearances on TV series such as Bonanza, Mannix, Love American Style and Night Court, and played a pool player in an episode of CBS-TV's The Dukes of Hazzard.

== Death ==
Barron died on December 1, 2000, at age 67 in Salinas, California, and was interred in Salinas's Garden of Memories Memorial Park.

== Filmography ==
=== Anime ===
Year	Title	Role	Notes
1980	Don de la mancha	Doctor / Dream Quixote / Villager 1	2 episodes; uncredited
1980	Tomb of Dracula	Al / Narrator / Stud / Tomo / Walla	Uncredited
1981	Dr. Slump	Bear / Coach / Frank	Episode: "Arale-chan Tanjou/Ossu! Otomodachi"; uncredited
1981	Dogtanian and the Three Muskehounds	Treville	
1984	Macross: Boobytrap	Airshow Announcement	
1985	Time Patrol		TV movie; credited as Merle Pearson
1985	Robotech	Admiral / Detroit Mayor / MC	85 episodes
1985	Qing bao long hu men	Kramer	Credited as Robert Barron
1985	Captain Harlock and the Queen of a Thousand Years	Bully / Devlin / General / Major / Walla	65 episodes; uncredited
1986	Robotech: The Movie	Prof. Embry	Credited as Merle Pearson
1986	Macron 1	Narrator / Geraldan / Computer	Uncredited
1987	Wicked City	President (USA dub)	
1987	Twilight of the Cockroaches	Elder	Credited as Robert Barron

=== Film ===
Year	Title	Role	Notes
1966	The Las Vegas Hillbillys	Donald	Credited as Christian Anderson
1967	Cottonpickin' Chickenpickers	Cousin Elwood	Credited as Christian Anderson
1968	The Road Hustlers	Luke Reedy	Credited as Christian Anderson
1977	MacArthur	POW	Uncredited
1980	The Private Eyes	Gas Station Attendant	
1982	Eating Raoul	Butler at Swingers Party	
1982	Rocket to Stardom	Farmer	Short Film
1982	Honkytonk Man	Undertaker	
1983	A Minor Miracle	Drunk #1	Credited as Robert Barron
1986	The Supernaturals	Old Vet	Credited as Robert Barron
1987	Disorderlies	Funeral Home Director	
1988	Daddy's Boys	Axelrod	
1989	Bill & Ted's Excellent Adventure	Abraham Lincoln	
1989	The Horror Show	Death-a-Thon Announcer	
1989	The Spring	Old Indian	
1989	The Brave Frog	Goliath / Narrator (voice)	
1994	A Dangerous Place	Homeless Man	Final Film Role

=== Television ===
Year	Title	Role	Notes
1964	The Virginian	Chuck	Episode: "The Girl from Yesterday"; credited as Christian Anderson
1964	Valentine's Day	Angry Patron / Club Member	2 episodes
1965–1969	The Wild Wild West	Servant #2 / Mark Dawson	2 episodes; credited as Christian Anderson
1966–1969	Bonanza	Cavalry Trooper / Stagecoach Driver / Hunter	3 episodes; credited as Christian Anderson
1967	The Red Skelton Hour	Minor Role	Episode: "Where There's Smoke, There's a Dragon"
1967	The Beverly Hillbillies	Harold	Episode: "Robin Hood and the Sheriff"; credited as Christian Anderson
1967	Judd, for the Defense	George Flowers	Episode: "Firebrand"; credited as Christian Anderson
1968	Mannix	Car Rental Manager	Episode: "A View of Nowhere"; uncredited
1972	Love, American Style	Abraham Lincoln	Episode: "Love and the Ghost"
1978	The Next Step Beyond	Peter Combs	Episode: "The Haunted Inn"
1979	Detective School	Burt	Episode: "The Bank Job"
1980	Young Maverick	Undertaker	2 episodes
1982	The Dukes of Hazzard	Chickasaw Thins	Episode: "A Little Game of Pool"
1983	Ace Diamond Private Eye	The Organist	TV movie
1985	Wildside	Cook	Episode: "Well Known Secret"
1985	Amazing Stories	Curator	Episode: "Alamo Jobe"
1985	Night Court	Ray Muntz	Season 3, episode 10 "The Wheels of Justice (Part 2)"
1987	Night Court	Jeff Prescott / The Red Ranger	Season 5, episode 7 "Who Was That Mashed Man?"
1987	The Magical World of Disney	Mortician	Episode: "Bride of Boogedy"
1987	Falcon Crest	Hippie	Episode: "Hunter's Moon"
1987–1989	L.A. Law	Leonard / Wino	2 episodes
1989	Out of This World	Abraham Lincoln	Episode: "Honest Evie"
1989	Alien Nation	Celinite Priest	Episode: "Fountain of Youth"
1990	Father Dowling Mysteries	Tony	Episode: "The Medical Mystery"
1990	Thanksgiving Day	Father Joe	TV movie
1991	Get a Life	Abe Lincoln	Episode: "Psychic 2000"
1991	Frankenstein: The College Years	Prof. Lippzieg	TV movie
1991	Quantum Leap	Old Convict	Episode: "Unchained - November 2, 1956"
1993–1994	Mighty Morphin Power Rangers	Additional Voices	39 episodes

=== Video games ===
Year	Title	Role	Notes
1992	Star Trek: 25th Anniversary	Brother Stephen	Credited as Robert Barron
