= Afterlife (video game) =

1996 video game

- Developer: LucasArts
- Publisher: LucasArts
- Designer: Michael Stemmle
- Composer: Peter McConnell
- Platforms: Windows, MS-DOS, Macintosh
- Release: June 27, 1996
- Genre: God game
- Mode: Single-player

Afterlife is a god game released by LucasArts in June 1996 that places the player in the role of a semi-omnipotent being known as a Demiurge, with the job of creating a functional Heaven and Hell to reward or punish the citizens of the local planet. The player does not assign citizens to their various punishments and rewards since the game does this automatically. Instead, the player creates the infrastructure (roads, zones for the various sins/virtues, reincarnation centers) that allows the afterlife to function properly. Players are accountable for the job that they do because of their bosses, The Powers That Be, check in from time to time. The player also has the assistance of two advisors—Aria Goodhalo, an angel, and Jasper Wormsworth, a demon. Aria and Jasper provide warnings when things are going wrong with the afterlife, and offer tips on how to fix the problems.

The game is satirical, with various references to pop culture (such as a passing mention of a "San Quentin Scarearantino" or sending a Death Star to destroy buildings if the player cheats too much).

== Gameplay ==
The primary goal of the game is to provide divine and infernal services for the inhabitants of the afterlife. This afterlife caters to one particular planet, known simply as the Planet. The creatures living on the Planet are called EMBOs, or Ethically Mature Biological Organisms. When an EMBO dies, its soul travels to the afterlife where it attempts to find an appropriate "fate structure". Fate structures are places where souls are rewarded or punished, as appropriate, for the virtues or sins that they practiced while they were alive.

While the seven sins are based on the seven deadly sins, only two of the seven virtues correspond to the seven heavenly virtues.

Sins:

- Envy
- Avarice
- Gluttony
- Sloth
- Pride
- Wrath
- Lust

Virtues:

- Contentment
- Charity
- Temperance
- Diligence
- Humility
- Peacefulness
- Chastity

Alternatively, players can choose to lay down generic zones for fate structures, that can house all souls of all types easily. However, these structures do not support as much population or are as effective as the single virtues/sins, and are more of a short-term solution for lost souls who cannot find a reward/punishment.

Jasper (left) and Aria (right), the player's advisors

The paths that souls take through the afterlife depend largely on the tenets of the souls' belief systems. Depending on these tenets, a soul may visit a single fate structure or it may be rewarded/punished for multiple sins or virtues. Tenets also determine whether a soul will visit only Heaven, only Hell, or both, as well as whether that soul will reincarnate after it has received its final reward or punishment.

The player can view of the current distribution of sins and virtues on the Planet, as well as the percentages of EMBOs who believe in each of the tenets. The player may spend a considerable amount of money to influence an important EMBO on the Planet. This influence can cause the EMBO to adopt one or more of the sins or virtues, as well as persuade him or her to believe in the tenet or tenets selected. This EMBO will then spread their newfound ideals, which will cause a shift in the beliefs and sins/virtues in the surrounding area.

At the start of the game, the EMBOs on the planet will be at the lowest level of technology, which is fire. As the game progresses, new technologies are discovered, ranging from pottery to medicine to aviation. New technologies help the EMBOs to become more widespread on the planet, which means a larger population for the afterlife when they die. The development of new technologies can be assisted by wielding influence on an EMBO artist or inventor in the same way that EMBOs are persuaded to new tenets or sins and virtues.

Screenshot from the game

Most buildings in the afterlife produce vibes, which are a measure of how buildings affect one another. Buildings can either produce "good vibes" or "bad vibes". Fate structures need to be under the appropriate type of vibe (good in Heaven, bad in Hell) in order to evolve into larger and more efficient structures.

As Demiurge, the player receives a yearly paycheque from The Powers That Be. The amount received is based on a number of factors, such as the number of souls that passed through the gates of the afterlife in that year.

The player's afterlife is staffed by angels (in Heaven) and demons (in Hell). At first, all workers are imported and must commute from other afterlives, which quickly becomes expensive. The costs can be lowered by building Topias to house workers in the player's afterlife, making the commute unnecessary. Employment costs can be further reduced by building training centers, which train processed souls to become angels and demons.

Balance can be done in two ways. The first, the Micromanager, allows the player to browse a specific structure and adjust its balance level for free unless the player decides to lock the structure, in which case a maintenance fee is charged yearly. The balance level is measured in a grayscale bar, with the two extremes dedicating to research (permanent souls) or production (temporary souls). The Macromanager, on the other hand, allows the player to balance manually or automatically all fate structures of a specific virtue/sin simultaneously.

"Bad Things", which are akin to natural disasters, occur at random. Each one can be repelled by one of the Special Buildings that are granted as rewards for reaching population milestones. Bad Things can be disabled via an in-game menu. However, doing so decreases the player's soul rate by half.

Like most god games, Afterlife is open-ended and does not have set conditions for winning. There are, however, a few definite ways of losing the game. These include having an excessive number of unemployed workers (leading to an all-out war between Heaven and Hell), staying too deep in debt for too long (wherein the Surfers of the Apocalypso appear to destroy everything), and the Planet's population being wiped out by either nuclear warfare or an asteroid event.

== Development ==
Lead designer Michael Stemmle said the idea for the game came as he played SimCity, combined with a fascination for creating an organized afterlife "that tickled my bone ever since I read Dante's Inferno". Stemmle added that he was trying to go literal on how simulation games were described as "god games", and a twist on how simulations usually go for the mundane: "These games are all about being a mayor or a president or running a DNA lab. Why do game designers think game players fantasize about wearing suits?". In what he attributed to LucasArts being "a rather experimental studio at the time", his pitch was approved and a team of 20 people would then work on the game. Stemmle wanted in particular to go "whole hog goofy" by not having a setting trapped to reality, full of satirical descriptions and pun-based names. He found Hell to be easier to design, as "ironic punishments are dime a dozen", leading him to find Heaven more creatively rewarding. The otherworldly elements made tester Brian Kemp note "It's kind of strange trying to spot logic bugs in a pure fantasy environment, and mastering challenges such as how the Ad Infinitum charge works." Stemmle added references to the Stanford Band which he joined in college, as "EMBO" derives from the term "Executive Marching Band Officers", and an easter egg building containing a message about Stemmle's beliefs recreates the "Band Shak" where the band resided. Designer Paul Mica said the major theme for the art was Heaven with a classical look while Hell was "more intestinal", with the artists being given free rein rather than impose a uniform art style. Influences listed on the design included H.R. Giger, Terry Gilliam, Klasky Csupo, Moebius, and Ralph Bakshi. The interface at first would resemble sculptures before Mica came up with assigning the buttons to a unit resembling a remote control. In a contrast to how previous LucasArts games released the PC version first before porting to the Macintosh, advances in programming to ease portability allowed Afterlife to be the first with simultaneous release. The game had only four voice actors, at first only Rebecca James as Aria and Milton James as Jasper recording across two weeks, before adding at the last minute an animated opening with a hospital featuring Steve Blum and Carrie Gordon, which voice director Darragh O'Farrell said was recorded in a "mad dash" of two days going from LucasArts' headquarters in San Rafael to Los Angeles. Composer Peter McConnell said that he tried to be "lighthearted, but respectful" in scoring a comedic approach to a subject often considered delicate. For considering D minor to be a "key of doom" in orchestral music, he went with the similar C-sharp minor to convey Hell, as well as brooding pieces reminiscent of Carmina Burana and Bach. Heaven led to classical choir, Eastern and Beatles-influenced music. The overall background music tried to evoke both the seven deadly sins and Karma with usage of Gregorian chant and Indian influences.

== Reception ==
Reception

Aggregate score
Aggregator	Score
GameRankings	75%

Review scores
Publication	Score
AllGame	3.5/5
CNET Gamecenter	7/10
Computer Games Strategy Plus	3/5
Computer Gaming World	4/5
Game Informer	8.75/10
GameSpot	7.6/10
Next Generation	4/5 (MAC); 3/5 (PC)
PC Zone	(1996) 88% (1998) 72%
Computer Game Review	90%
MacUser	2.5/5
PC Games	A−

Afterlife received "favorable" reviews according to the review aggregation website GameRankings. A Next Generation critic called the game "a title that will immediately attract anyone who was even mildly amused by the mother of all sim-builders, SimCity", and praised the vast number of options and responsibilities, the characters, and the complex government. They also made similar praises of the PC version, but with a lower score.

Michael Stemmle noted that in spite of a small budget, the sales of Afterlife were still low enough to not turn a profit.

Tim Carter in Computer Gaming World called Afterlife "a well-designed simulation that adds a lot of new twists to a successful genre." He praised the game for its humor, variety, and systems, while criticizing it for its "completely inadequate documentation."

Pyramid magazine reviewed Afterlife and stated that "Welcome to Afterlife. You assume the role of a Demiurge, appointed to run Heaven and Hell for a planet inhabited by EMBOs (Ethically Mature Biological Organisms) with a culture similar to ours. Your job is to zone space for punishments and rewards. To this end you are given money, undeveloped astral territory, and advisors to assist you."

Macworld gave Afterlife its 1996 "Best Simulation Game" award.

In a critical reappraisal in 2014, PC Gamer writer Richard Cobbett looked back on Afterlife writing that the game represented a unique idea "trapped in little more than a clone of SimCity 2000." He argued "it's one of LucasArts' least-remembered games for a reason, being neither good nor bad, but a definite wasted opportunity."

In 2023, Aftermath writer Chris Person revisited Afterlife and reflected on its impact after finally unlocking all the game's structures 27 years after its release. He called it "complicated and counter-intuitive" yet "wildly funny and structurally fascinating in a way that no other game is."
