= Dogtanian and the Three Muskehounds (film) =

- Theatrical release poster
- Spanish: D'Artacán y los Tres Mosqueperros
- Directed by: Toni García
- Screenplay by: Doug Langdale
- Based on: Dogtanian and the Three Muskehounds
- Music by: Manel Gil-Inglada
- Production companies: Apolo Films; Cosmos-Maya
- Distributed by: A Contracorriente Films
- Release dates: 13 June 2021 (Huesca); 18 August 2021 (Spain)
- Running time: 88 minutes
- Countries: Spain; India
- Language: Spanish
- Budget: €8 million
- Box office: $3.1 million

Dogtanian and the Three Muskehounds (Spanish: D'Artacán y los Tres Mosqueperros), known as The Dog Knight in North America, is a 2021 Spanish-Indian animated adventure comedy film directed by Toni García and written by Doug Langdale, based on the 1981 Spanish-Japanese television series of the same name, in turn adapted from Alexandre Dumas' 1844 story of d'Artagnan and The Three Musketeers. The film is produced by Apolo Films (BRB Internacional's cinema studio) and Cosmos Maya.

== Plot ==
Dogtanian, a young swordsman, visits Paris in dreams of joining the Muskehounds. Entering Muskehound headquarters, he meets the Monsieur de Treville, where he explains that Dogtanian's father is framed by the Cardinal Richelieu, and later concludes that he is unfit to become a Muskehound. He accidentally runs into the three Muskehounds, who all engage him in a duel. Following a fight with the Cardinal's guards, the Muskehounds praise Dogtanian for being a hero.

One night, Dogtanian rescues Juliette, a lady which Dogtanian has meet, being captured by the Cardinal's guards. Juliette explains to Dogtanian that Richelieu is plotting a war between France and England, so he can seize all of Europe. However, Queen Anne of Austria plans to send a letter to the King of England to ensure peace between the two countries, with a diamond necklace from King Louis included. Juliette warns Dogtanian that if the necklace is stolen by Richelieu, it could lead to war. Dogtanian remembers Count Rochefort, Cardinal Richelieu's spy, discussing about the diamonds to Milady de Winter.

The next morning, Juliette warns the Muskehounds about the diamond necklace. That night, Dogtanian confronts Milady in a palace. He gives chase, but she manages to escape. Juliette discovers that Milady is going to Calais to board a ship. Dogtanian and the Muskehounds split up as they set off, and he eventually reaches Calais alone, but finds Milady already departing on her ship.

Dogtanian meets a pirate named Captain Bloodhound, who agrees to help him intercept Milady. They reach her ship, where Dogtanian duels her to recover the necklace. Afterwards, Dogtanian breaks into the palace, where he confronts and interrogates Rochefort about his father; the latter reveals that he arranged a plot to frame the former's father. Richelieu and his henchmen Widimir attempt to murder Dogtanian by a gunshot when he refuses to give the necklace to the former, but Pip, his friend, takes the hit. Dogtanian fears Pip is dead, but realizes that he was protected by a gold coin. Milady delivers the necklace to Queen Anne, and Dogtanian officially becomes a member of the Muskehounds, while Richelieu vows revenge.

== Cast ==
=== Original Spanish cast ===
- Miguel Ángel Pérez as D’Artacan, Pom
- Eduardo Jover as Padre D’Artacan
- Gloria Cámara as Madra D’Artacan and Dama de la Reina
- Antonio Ramírez as Rofty, Guardia del Cardenal, and Contrabandistas
- Ana Esther Alborg as Juliette
- Ana María Marí as Milady de Winter
- Luis Bajo as Conde de Rochefort
- Carlos Kaniowsky as Treville

=== Catalan cast ===
- Ivan Labanda as D’Artacan
- Raúl Llorens as Amis
- José Posada as Pontos
- Santi Lorenz as Dogos
- Eduardo Jover as D’Artacan's father
- Núria Trifol as Juliette
- Joan Carles Gustems as Richelieu
- José Luis Mediavilla as Pom
- Domènech Farell as Widimir
- Alicia Laorden as Milady de Winter
- Juan Antonio Bernal as Rochefort
- Jordi Boixaderas as Treville
- Pep Anton Muñoz as King Louis XIII
- Alfonso Vallés as Captain Bloodhound

=== English dub ===
- Tomás Ayuso as Dogtanian
- Scott Cleverdon as Dogtanian's father, Captain Bloodhound, Parisian #1, Aristocrat #1
- Elisabeth Gray as Dogtanian's mother, Milady, Parrot, Lady-in-Waiting, Flower Girl, Parisian #2, Aristocrat #2, Children
- Miguel Ángel Pérez as Sandy, Muskehound #2, Cardinal's Guard #3, Smuggler #3
- Robbie K. Jones as Pip, Treville
- Karina Piper as Juliette, Queen Anne of Austria
- W. Blair Holmes as Rochefort
- Stephen Hughes as Porthos, Anthos, Richelieu, Muskehound #1, Cardinal's Guard #2, Palace Servants, Dubois, Parisian #3, Aristocrat #3, Capitan of the Lis D'or, Smuggler #2
- Julio Perillán as Aramis, King Louis XIII
- Jess Espinoza as Widimir, Cardinal's Guard #1, Smuggler #1

== Production ==
According to their main website, BRB Internacional was planning a new feature-length CGI film to be released in 2016, but was delayed for unknown reasons. In April 2019, Apolo Films took over production of the film. The film was written by Doug Langdale and directed by Toni Garcia. The film was released in theaters under the title Dogtanian and the Three Muskehounds.

Claudio had been planning to make the movie since at least 2011, as BRB Internacional had been producing less TV series due to the proliferation of dedicated channels aimed at children and their early adoption of new technologies. Claudio, under the principle that cinema is the "audiovisual cathedral", decided to begin production, but there was a lack of money. After obtaining the necessary support from skilled professionals, funding arrived from Televisión Española and Banco Santander. The female characters in the movie gained an increased role, with Milady being compared to Catwoman.

The film maintains the original series opening main theme tune composed by Guido and Maurizio De Angelis. Additionally, they have composed new songs for the film.

Animation was done by Cosmos Maya in Mumbai, India.

== Release ==
In Spain, it was originally slated for an opening in theatres on 22 January 2021, but its release was postponed to August 18 due to the COVID-19 pandemic.

The film had its world premiere at the Huesca International Film Festival on 13 June 2021.

The film was released in the United Kingdom on 25 June 2021.

In 2022, Viva Pictures released the film on streaming services in North America, retitled The Dog Knight.

== Reception ==
On the review aggregator website Rotten Tomatoes, 57% of 7 critics' reviews are positive.

== Sequel television series ==
A Dogtanian television series, titled Dogtanian, The Hero, was in development. It would take place after the events of the 2021 film. There has been no news since then.

== See also ==
- List of Spanish films of 2021
