= Kerrigan Mahan =

American voice actor

- Born: Kerrigan Patrick Mahan; Los Angeles, California, U.S.
- Occupation: Voice actor
- Years active: 1975–present
- Spouses: Joyce Kurtz (m. 1993, divorced) Melanie Williams (m. 2003)
- Father: Billy Mahan

Kerrigan Patrick Mahan is an American voice actor. He has had voice roles in Lensman, Zillion, Vampire Hunter D and Crying Freeman, as Goldar in Mighty Morphin Power Rangers and Power Rangers Zeo, Jeb the talking dog in VR Troopers, and the original Magna Defender in Power Rangers Lost Galaxy.

Mahan has also been involved in theater work, directing Matty: An Evening With Christy Mathewson, a play based on the life of baseball player Christy Mathewson, who was portrayed by another voice actor, Eddie Frierson. He played the villain Clint on S.W.A.T.'s "Omega One". He was also the director for two episodes of the English version of the TV series Grimm's Fairy Tale Classics.

== Filmography ==
=== Anime ===
List of voice performances in anime
Year	Title	Role	Notes	Source
1981	Dogtanian and the Three Muskehounds	Cardinal Richelieu		
1984	Lensman	Kimball Kinnison		
1985	Robotech	Sean Phillips		
1985	Space Pirate Captain Harlock	Terry Drake		
1987	Lily C.A.T.	Watts		
1988	Crying Freeman	Ryuji Hanayama, 108 Dragons Elder		
1989	Dragon Ball	Yamcha	Harmony Gold dub	
1989	The Return of Dogtanian	Cardinal Richelieu		
1990	Zillion	Champ		
1991	Zillion: Burning Night	Champ		
1991	Doomed Megalopolis	Tatsumia		
1991	3×3 Eyes	Yakumo's Friend		
1992	Vampire Hunter D	Rei Ginsei		
1994	Babel II	Wong		
1995	Crimson Wolf	Professor Ezawa		
1995	Teknoman	Ringo Richards		
1997	Psycho Diver: Soul Siren	Kunimitsu		
2003	Initial D	Bunta Fujiwara	Tokyopop dub	

=== Animation ===
List of voice performances in animation
Year	Title	Role	Notes	Source
1993	Journey to the Heart of the World	John		
1994	Fantastic Four	The Seeker	Episode: "Inhumans Saga Part 3: Beware the Hidden Land"	
1997	Cow and Chicken	Various characters	Episode: "Supermodel Cow/Part Time Job"	
1999	Batman Beyond	Kobra One, Main Kobra Ops, Baker	3 episodes	
2000–2004	Static Shock	Edwin Alva	Recurring role	
2000	God, the Devil and Bob	Additional voices	Episode: "In the Beginning"	
2001	As Told by Ginger	Ludlow Krantz	Episode: "The 'A' Ticket"	
2002	What's New, Scooby-Doo?	Del Stone	Episode: "Riva Ras Regas"	
2002	Family Guy	Michael Douglas	Episode: "Family Guy Viewer Mail #1"	

=== Live action ===
Year	Title	Role	Notes
1975	S.W.A.T.	Clinton	Episode: "Omega One"
1976–77	Family	Gas Station Attendant, Student	2 episodes
1978	The Incredible Hulk	Ritchie Forrest	Episode: "Escape from Los Santos"
1982	CHiPs	Mechanic	Episode: "Speedway Fever"
1986	T. J. Hooker	Morgan	Episode: "Death Trip"
1988	Run If You Can	Gilbert	
1990	Alien Nation	Cameraman	Episode: "Eyewitness News"
2000–2001	The District	P.J. Hawks	10 episodes
2002	Angel	Jollyburger	Episode: "Loyalty"; uncredited

=== Films ===
List of voice performances in film
Year	Title	Role	Notes	Source
1986	Robotech: The Movie	Mark Landry		
1987	Lensman: Power of the Lens	Kimball Kinnison		
1988	Robotech II: The Sentinels	Jack Baker		
1989	Kiki's Delivery Service	Jiji, Driver 2	Streamline Pictures dub	
1992	Bebe's Kids	Security Guard #3, Fun World Patrolman		
1993	Dirty Pair: Project Eden	Carson D. Carson	Streamline Pictures dub	
1994	The Santa Clause	Reindeer		
1998	Dr. Dolittle	Penguin		

=== Video games ===
List of voice performances in video games
Year	Title	Role	Notes	Source
1992	Star Trek: 25th Anniversary Enhanced	Lt. Stragey, Brother Chubb		
1993	Star Trek: Judgment Rites	Mr. Jons, Gellert, Stambob		
1994	Might and Magic: World of Xeen	Various		
1996	Lighthouse: The Dark Being	The Dark Being		
2004	Halo 2	ILB: Agent, Papa Zaman		
2019	Power Rangers: Battle for the Grid	Goldar		

=== Other dubs ===
List of voice performances in other dubs
Year	Title	Role	Notes	Source
1993	Mighty Morphin Power Rangers	Goldar	Credited as Ryan O'Flannigan	
1996	Power Rangers Zeo	Goldar		
1997	Team Knight Rider	Beast		
1999	Power Rangers Lost Galaxy	Magna Defender		
2001	Power Rangers Time Force	Chameliacon		
2002	Power Rangers Wild Force	Monitor Org		
