= Milt Jamin =

American voice actor (1942–2018)

- Born: Milton Jamin; December 7, 1939; Jackson Heights, New York, U.S.
- Died: January 1, 2018 (age 78); New York City, U.S.
- Other names: Milton James; Richard Barnes; Murray Williams; Jaque Maecell
- Occupation: Actor
- Years active: 1979–2017

Milton "Milt" Jamin (December 7, 1939 – January 1, 2018), often known professionally as Milton James, was an American voice and film actor.

== Early life ==
Jamin was born on December 7, 1939, and grew up in Jackson Heights, New York. He attended Lafayette High School and Brooklyn College.

Jamin later went on to serve in the National Guard in 1958.

== Personal life and death ==
Jamin lived in Los Angeles for 26 years before he returned to New York to be closer to his family.

He died due to complications of a stroke on January 1, 2018, at the age of 78.

== Filmography ==
=== Video games ===
- Afterlife (1996) - Jasper Wormsworth
- Grim Fandango (1998) – Membrillo
- Xenogears (1998) – Dr. Citan Uzuki
- Star Wars: Rebellion (1998) – IMP-22
- Spyro 2: Ripto's Rage (1999) – Moneybags, Various Voices
- Lands of Lore 3 (1999) – CABAL
- Command & Conquer: Tiberian Sun (1999) – CABAL
- Diablo 2 (2000) – Baal
- Diablo 2: Lord of Destruction (2001) – Baal
- Warcraft III: Reign of Chaos (2002) – Archmage
- Warcraft III: Frozen Throne (2003) – Archmage
- Bully (2006) – Mr. Matthews (uncredited)
- Grand Theft Auto IV (2008) – United Liberty Paper
- Grand Theft Auto V (2013) – United Liberty Paper
- Cars 3: Driven to Win (2017) – Ramone, Smokey
- Warcraft 3: Reforged (2020) – Archmage

=== Animation dubbing ===
==== Animated series ====
- The Transformers (1986–1987) – Blast Off, Stylor, Grax, Aimless
- The Return of Dogtanian (1989) – Planchet, Baron de la Tour

=== Anime dubbing ===
==== Anime ====
- Fist of the North Star (1984–1987) – Additional Voices
- Nadia: The Secret of Blue Water (1990–1991) – Neo-Atlantian Commander (Streamline Dub)
- Teknoman (1992–1993) – Additional Voices
- Magic Knight Rayearth (1994–1995) – Chang Ang
- Street Fighter II V (1995) – Zoltar, Additional Voices (Animaze Dub)
- Rurouni Kenshin (1996–1998) – Additional Voices (Media Blasters Dub)
- Outlaw Star (1998) – Professor Nguyen Khan
- Trigun (1998) – Leonof the Puppet-Master, Sheriff Stan (ep. 4)
- The Big O (1999–2003) – Norman Burg (eps. 1–13), Additional Voices
- Arc the Lad (2001) – Gogen
- Mobile Suit Gundam 0083: Stardust Memory (1991-1992) - Aiguille Delaz

==== OVAs and Specials ====
- Megazone 23 – Part II (1986) – Cop 1, FX Bridge 1, Wizard (International Dub)

==== Anime films ====
- Lupin the 3rd: The Castle of Cagliostro (1979) – Jodo (Animaze Dub)
- Golgo 13: The Professional (1983) – Albert
- Lensman (1984) – Zuilk (Streamline Dub)
- Robotech: The Movie (1986) – Dr. Peters, Fake Good Samaritan 1
- Yu Yu Hakusho: The Golden Seal (1993) – Tree Demon (Animaze Dub)
- Street Fighter II: The Animated Movie (1994) – Senoh
- Ghost in the Shell (1995) – Additional Voices

=== Live action ===
==== Film ====
- To Be or Not To Be (1983) – Gestapo Soldier
- The Stranger (1987) – Brandt
- Dark Angel: The Ascent (1994) – Mayor Wharton
- Devil in the Flesh (1998) – Mr. Monsour

==== Television ====
- Battlestar Galactica (1979) - Alliance Leader (Episode: "Experiment in Terra")
- Angie (1980) - Waiter (Episode: "Brad's Best Buddy")
- Mork & Mindy (1982) - The Waiter (Episode: "Gotta Run: Part 1")
- Falcon Crest (1983) - Waiter (Episode: Ultimatums)
