= Simon Prescott =

American voice actor

- Occupation: Voice actor
- Years active: 1960–present
- Agent: The Wallis Agency
- Notable work: Cyborg 009: The Cyborg Soldier as Professor Isaac Gilmore; Metropolis as Dr. Laughton; Rurouni Kenshin as Aritomo Yamagata

Simon Prescott is an American voice actor who is best known for his work in the anime and film industries. Notable roles include Dr. Laughton in Metropolis and Aritomo Yamagata in Rurouni Kenshin.

== Filmography ==
=== Anime ===
- Akira – Dr. Onishi (Pioneer dub)
- Argento Soma – Air Force Official A, Scientist A
- Bastard!! – Great Priest Goe Note Soto
- Button Nose – Malcolm
- Casshan – Slave Elder
- Cowboy Bebop – Doctor, Doohan
- Cyborg 009: The Cyborg Soldier – Professor Isaac Gilmore
- Dogtanian and the Three Muskehounds – King Louis XIII
- Ghost in the Shell – Nakamura
- Ghost in the Shell: Stand Alone Complex – Old Man
- Kikaider 01: The Animation – Futen
- Lupin the Third – Doctor Oz
- Metropolis – Dr. Laughton
- Mobile Suit Gundam movies – Degwin Sodo Zabi
- Mobile Suit Gundam 0083: Stardust Memory – Eiphar Synapse
- Mobile Suit Gundam F91 – Meitzer Ronah
- Outlaw Star – Old Tao Master
- Panda! Go Panda! – Zoo Master
- Rurouni Kenshin – Aritomo Yamagata
- Samurai Champloo – Heitarou Kawara
- Street Fighter Alpha: The Animation – Gouken
- Street Fighter Alpha: Generations – Old Master
- Street Fighter II: V – Grandfather, Caretaker
- Teknoman – Darkon
- Transformers: Robots in Disguise – Dr. Hikasye
- Wowser – Professor Dinghy
- Hello Kitty's Paradise – Professor

=== Other animated roles ===
- The Return of Dogtanian – King Louis XIII

=== Film ===
- The Good, the Bad and the Ugly 2002 DVD – Angel Eyes
- The Prince of Light: The Legend of Ramayana

=== Live-action ===
- Bat Masterson (1960, TV Series) – Deputy Al
- M Squad (1960, TV Series) – Danny Boy
- Summer and Smoke (1961) – (uncredited)
- Hell is for Heroes (1962) – Thomas
- Hud (1963) – Man in Greased Pig Sequence
- The Carpetbaggers (1964) – Reporter
- Where Love Has Gone (1964) – (uncredited)
- The Outer Limits (1964, TV Series) – The Guard
- The Fugitive (1965–1966, TV Series) – Plainclothes Cop / Officer
- Iron Horse (1966, TV Series) – Aces
- Stagecoach (1966) – (uncredited)
- Rough Night in Jericho (1967) – Card Player (uncredited)
- Hell's Bloody Devils (1970)
- Mission Impossible (1970, TV Series) – Security Guard
- Devil Rider! (1970) – Penny's Attacker
- Hangup (1974) – Morton
- Bronk (1975, TV Series) – Pawnshop Operator
- Rollercoaster (1977) – Supporting (uncredited)
- The Dwelling (1993) – Hooker's Client
- Mighty Morphin Power Rangers (1995, TV Series) – Master Vile (uncredited)
- Power Rangers Zeo (1996, TV Series) – Master Vile (uncredited)
- Power Rangers: Lost Galaxy (1999, TV Series) – Loyax
- Exit to Heaven (2000)
- SpaceDisco One (2007) – O'Brian

=== Video games ===
- .hack//Mutation – Additional Voices
- .hack//Outbreak – Additional Voices
- Dark Reign 2 – Ordic
- Heavy Gear II – Petrus
- Heroes of Might and Magic III: The Restoration of Erathia
- Lords of Everquest – Additional Voices
- Might and Magic VII: For Blood and Honor
- Might and Magic IX
- Seven Samurai 20XX - Necryl, Kyric
- Star Trek: Judgment Rites – Bivander Zane, Uhland, Tuskin
- Stonekeep – Torin, Gargoyle
