= Dogtanian and the Three Muskehounds =

1981 Spanish–Japanese animated TV series

- Title screen revealing Dogtanian
- Spanish: D'Artacán y los Tres Mosqueperros
- Kanji: ワンワン三銃士
- Revised Hepburn: Wan Wan Sanjuushi
- Genre: Animation, action, comedy-drama, fantasy
- Based on: The Three Musketeers by Alexandre Dumas
- Developed by: Claudio Biern Boyd
- Written by: Akira Nakahara; Taku Sugiyama; Yoshihiro Kimura
- Directed by: Taku Sugiyama; Shigeo Koshi; Luis Ballester
- Music by: Katsuhisa Hattori
- Opening theme: Guido & Maurizio De Angelis
- Countries of origin: Spain; Japan
- Original languages: Spanish; Japanese
- No. of episodes: 26 (24 aired in Japan)

Production
- Executive producer: Claudio Biern Boyd
- Producers: Endo Shigeo; Junzo Nakajima
- Production companies: BRB Internacional; Nippon Animation

Original release
- Network: JNN (MBS)
- Release: 9 October 1981 – 26 March 1982
- Network: TVE1
- Release: 9 October 1982 – 9 April 1983

Related
- The Return of Dogtanian

Dogtanian and the Three Muskehounds (Note: Spanish: D'Artacán y los Tres Mosqueperros, Japanese: ワンワン三銃士, romanized: Wan Wan Sanjuushi, lit. 'Woof Woof Three Musketeers') is a Spanish–Japanese children's animated television series based on the classic 1844 Alexandre Dumas story of d'Artagnan and The Three Musketeers, produced by Spanish studio BRB Internacional, with animation by Japanese studio Nippon Animation, that was first broadcast on MBS in Japan in 1981–82.

Most of the characters in the series are anthropomorphizations of dogs, hence the title of the cartoon, although there are a few exceptions, most notably, Milady the cat and Dogtanian's two sidekicks Pip the mouse and Planchet the bear, among several others.

In 1985, BRB Internacional released a television film edited from the series entitled Dogtanian: Special. In 1989, they produced with Televisión Española and Thames Television a sequel series entitled The Return of Dogtanian. In 1995, they released a television film edited from the sequel series entitled Dogtanian: One For All and All For One. In 2021, Apolo Films (BRB International's cinema studio) and Cosmos Maya released a feature-length CGI film entitled Dogtanian and the Three Muskehounds in cinemas.

All twenty-six episodes of Dogtanian and the Three Muskehounds can be watched on the official YouTube channel set up by BRB Internacional.

== Plot ==
The story, set in 17th-century France, follows a young Dogtanian (D'Artagnan (ダルタニヤン) in the Japanese version and voiced by Satomi Majima (間嶋 里美) and D'Artacán in the Spanish version) who travels from Béarn to Paris in order to become one of King Louis XIII's musketeers (they are referred to as musketeers throughout the cartoon and only the title calls them 'Muskehounds'). He quickly befriends three musketeers (Porthos, Athos and Aramis), saving Juliette, a maid-in-waiting for Queen Anne of Austria. A key difference between the English-language dubs of the Dogtanian adaptions and Dumas' novel is that the names of Athos and Porthos were interchanged, making Athos the extrovert and Porthos the secretive noble of the group.

== Cast ==
=== English version ===
- Aramis – Eddie Frierson
- Juliette – Rebecca Forstadt
- Pip Squeak – Steve Kramer
- Widimer – Mike Reynolds
- Cardinal Richelieu – Kerrigan Mahan
- Queen Anne – Robin Levenson
- King Louis – Simon Prescott
- Narrator – Tom Wyner
- Dogtanian – Cam Clarke
- Porthos – Dan Woren
- Athos – Michael Sorich
- Blue Falcon – Robert Axelrod
- Planchet – Milton James
- Pig Guard – Richard Epcar
- Count Rochefort – Dave Mallow
- Monsieur Treville – Michael Forest
- Milady – Edie Mirman
- Rochefort's henchman – Theodore Lehmann
- Duke of Buckingham – Tom Wyner

== Production ==
Dogtanian stemmed from Claudio Biern Boyd's love for literature. As a child, before television arrived in Spain (the first broadcast was in 1956), he enjoyed reading works by authors such as Jules Verne, Emilio Salgari, Alexandre Dumas (père), Karl May and Edmondo de Amicis, while imagining the situations in the books he read. By the time he was part of the newly-formed BRB Internacional, after signing important contracts with animation studios for broadcast and merchandising, Claudio decided to do an original series instead, based on his favorite childhood books.

After adapting Cantar del mío Cid as Ruy el pequeño Cid, he adapted Dumas' The Three Musketeers and set the main characters as dogs, with the starting point being a two-part Salvat encyclopedia on them, costing 25pts. The species were defined according to his imagination. For the villains, Milady was set as a cat, an animal Claudio hated, and Richelieu was set as a fox in homage of a village he spent summers for years where the local villagers complained about a fox that raided henhouses at night. As of 2021, Claudio owned a bulldog, which, in the series, was the species of Richelieu's guard. Moreover, Dogtanian was chosen as a beagle in homage to Charles M. Schulz' character Snoopy, for which Claudio had an affinity.

As with his early series, pre-production work was done in Spain and post-production work in Japan at Nippon Animation's facilities in Tokyo. On the Spanish side, the series was directed by Luis Ballester and Claudio Biern Boyd, with the latter supervising the script, while in Japan, Shigeo Koshi was at the helm of the department while Shuichi Seki served as the series' character designer. The scripts were provided and handled by Claudio himself in their original Spanish language, then translated to Japanese by Akira Nakahara, Taku Sugiyama and Yoshihiro Kimura, which was the language used to animate the series. The dialogue was then rewritten by BRB's voice director Manuel Peiró to fit the animation in Japanese for the final Spanish cut.

Adapting the novel was complicated, mostly due to its length and tragedy. BRB's scriptwriting theme created a "clean and polished" product, removing most of the dark undertones of the original novel: the novel was set in a chaotic period of French history, with violence happening throughout. The Musketeers in the original work had the following characteristics: Athos was an alcoholic, Porthos the lover of a woman married to a rich man, whose only way to marry was with the death of her husband. D'Artagnan himself was an adulterer, courting his two loves, Milady and Constance. Much of these characteristics were removed from BRB's adaptation.

The choice of anthropomorphic characters was cheaper and removed traces of violence found in the original work. This style was not new for Nippon Animation, having done several animated series before where the characters were all anthropomorphic animals. These were made as such to be more attractive to children, expressing the way of being of the characters in a more direct manner. Dogtanian and the Muskehounds are portrayed with more "rounded" characteristics while the villains, especially Richelieu, were drawn in a more aggressive style. Milady, a cat, also represents the animal's association with stealth and espionage.

The series was produced in 1981 by BRB International and Nippon Animation and was first broadcast by MBS in Japan, where it began airing on 9 October of that year. A year after its premiere, it was broadcast for the first time in Spain on Televisión Española's Primera Cadena on 9 October 1982. The partnership between BRB International and Nippon Animation worked so well, that they collaborated again to work on another successful animated series two years later called Around the World with Willy Fog.

=== Japanese team ===
- Production company: Nippon Animation
- Executive producers: Endo Shigeo, Junzo Nakajima
- Director: Taku Sugiyama, Shigeo Koshi
- Screenplay: Akira Nakahara, Taku Sugiyama, Yoshihiro Kimura
- Music: Katsuhisa Hattori
- Character design: Shuichi Seki
- Storyboard: Taku Sugiyama, Shigeo Koshi, Fumio Kurokawa, Suzuki, Baba Ken, Saito Shuhokaku
- Layout supervision: Koji Mori
- Animation director: Takao Ogawa
- Art director: Kobayashi Shichiro, Kazue Ito
- Color: Takasago Yoshiko
- Animation: Sakai Shunichi, Kimura Keiichiro
- Additional animation: Anime R

=== Overseas adaptation ===
- Production company: BRB Internacional S.A
- Executive producer: Claudio Biern Boyd
- Director: Luis Ballester
- Dialogue adaptation: Manuel Peiro
- Music editing: Cabum Magister
- Sound technicians: Eduardo Fernández, Alfonso Pino, José María San Mateo, José Esquirol
- Sound: Estudios Exa, S.A.
- Lab: Fotofilm Madrid, S.A.
- Editing: Soledad López
- Editing assistant: Alicia Saavedra
- Effects: Luis Castro

=== English adaptation ===
- Directed by: Tom Wyner, Robert Barron, Byrd Ehlmann, Dave Mallow & Doug Stone
- Written by: Tom Wyner, Jason Klassi, Garry Morris, Melesio Rosales, Dayna Barron, Byrd Ehlmann

== Music ==
=== Spanish opening and ending ===
- Composed by: Guido and Maurizio de Angelis
- Sung by: Popitos

=== Japanese opening: ワンワン三銃士 (Wanwan Sanjūshi) ===
- Lyrics: Kayama Yoshiko
- Lyrics & arrangement: Katsuhisa Hattori
- Sung by: Kusaka Marron
- Chorus: Suginami Children Choir

=== Japanese ending: そういうお主は？ (Sōyū onushi wa?) ===
- Lyrics: Kayama Yoshiko
- Lyrics & arrangement: Katsuhisa Hattori
- Sung by: Kusaka Marron

=== English opening and ending ===
- Edited by: Cabum Magister
- Subpublished by: Southern Pictures Music Inc.
- Sung by: Hilary Mather, Elissa Mather, Ted Mather
- Recorded and re-mixed at: Fizz Sound Creation, Intersound Inc.

== Episode list ==
1. "Dogtanians Journey"
2. "Dogtanian Meets The Black Moustache"
3. "Paris, The City of Dreams"
4. "The Three Invincible Musketeers"
5. "Monsieur Treville, Captain of the Musketeers"
6. "Dogtanian Meets His Match"
7. "Dogtanian Meets The King"
8. "Juliette's Secret"
9. "Juliette Kidnapped"
10. "The Great Getaway"
11. "Dogtanian's Trance"
12. "Dogtanian to the Rescue": The Cardinal and Count Rochefort try to capture Juliet and find themselves in trouble with the Muskehounds.
13. "Dogtanian Meets Monsieur Pip"
14. "In Search For Juliet": The Cardinal and Count Rochefort do their best to come between Dogtanian and his friend Juliet.
15. "Dogtanian Saves the Day": Dogtanian and Juliet keep guard over the Queen during her secret meeting with the English duke.
16. "Daggers And Diamonds"
17. "The Journey To England"
18. "The Chase": Dogtanian and the Muskehounds race to get the Queen's necklace back to her in time and foil the Cardinal's plans to denounce her.
19. "Dogtanian is Put to the Test": Dogtanian has to win three races before he can become a full Musketeer.
20. "Dogtanian and the Blue Falcon": The Muskehounds unmask the robber chief the dreaded Blue Falcon.
21. "The Shipwreck"
22. "The Jungle Adventure": Dogtanian and his friend Pip try to escape from the Blue Falcon and his pirates.
23. "Marco's Mission"
24. "The Impostor"
25. "Milady's Revenge"
26. "Dogtanian's Dream Comes True"

== Accolades ==
- Bronze medal at the 1982 International Film & TV Festival of New York.
- Honorable mention at the 7th international 'Child of Our Time' festival, Milan.
- TP de Oro award for most popular children's series.
- Special award in the International Contest for Children & Youth of Gijón.

== Broadcast ==
The series first aired in Japan on the 20 (Note: Simultaneous broadcast on MBS (production station), HBC, ATV, TBC, FTV (now an FNN station), TBS, UTY, BSN, SBC, SBC, MRO, CBC, BSS, RHK, RCC, TYS, KUTV, RKB, OBS and RBC.) of the 25 (Note: Deferred broadcast on RKK, MRT and MBC. No broadcast at all on IBC and NBC.) stations of the Japan News Network (TBS) at the time, in block, with the Mainichi Broadcasting System responsible for co-production. The series aired on Fridays at 7pm during its run. Unlike in certain markets, ratings in Japan during its first run were sluggish, reporting only 4% ratings in the Kanto area. Due to poor viewer performance, MBS withdrew from producing animated shows for the 7pm timeslot and Calpis withdrew from sponsorship. After it ended, it was replaced by Jarinko Chie in its timeslot, which had been moved from a 5 pm Saturday slot on a handful of affiliates and was finally shown on much of the network as consequence. The series competed with Ninja Hattori-kun, and despite competition from similar shows at the time, merchandising was released in Japan.

The series premiered in Spain in 1982, and it only aired on TVE1 due to scheduling problems. This marked the premiere of the series in Europe. Before long, it was sold to numerous TV channels around the world, including RTP in Portugal, RAI in Italy, the BBC in the United Kingdom and TF1 in France, to high ratings. In Brazil, it aired on Rede Manchete in 1984 as part of the children's show Clube da Criança when Xuxa Meneghel was its host. It was repeated until 1986 on other children's programs shown on the network. The success of the show in Brazil caused Editora Riográfica (later Editora Globo) to import the comics based on the series from Spain. In the mid-2000s, the compilation film, released there under the home video title Lord Dog, aired on TV Brasília in the period when the station had disaffiliated itself from RedeTV!.

The series was dubbed into English by Intersound USA in 1985. Unusually for such a dub, it was made in Madrid by a group of American expatriates who lived there because of the Torrejón Air Base, which made it easier for BRB to find American voice talents. As well as dubbing the TV series, BRB also produced a TV film, which was again dubbed by Intersound USA.

== Home media ==
=== UK VHS releases ===
In the United Kingdom during the late 1980s, Video Collection International Ltd. released multiple episodes of Dogtanian and the Three Muskehounds on VHS after its broadcast on the BBC from 1985 to 1987, and its reruns on ITV from 1988 to 1990.

| Title | Release date | Episodes |
|---|---|---|
| Dogtanian and the Three Muskehounds (VC 1101) | 3 October 1988 | "Dogtanian's Journey"; "Dogtanian Meets the Black Moustache" |
| Dogtanian and the Three Muskehounds: Episodes 3 & 4 (VC1109) | 3 October 1988 | "Paris, the City of Dreams"; "The Three Invincible Musketeers" |
| Dogtanian and the Three Muskehounds: Episode 5 (WP 0008) | 7 November 1988 | "Monsieur Treville"; "Captain of the Musketeers" |
| Dogtanian and the Three Muskehounds: Episodes 6 & 7 (VC1118) | 6 February 1989 | "Dogtanian Meets his Match"; "Dogtanian Meets the King" |
| Dogtanian and the Three Muskehounds: Episodes 8 & 9 (LL 0005) | 1 May 1989 | "Juliet's Secret"; "Juliet Kidnapped" |
| Dogtanian and the Three Muskehounds: Episodes 10 & 11 (LL 0006) | 1 May 1989 | "The Great Getaway"; "Dogtanian's Trance" |
| The Complete Adventures of Dogtanian (VC1174) | 10 September 1990 | |
| Dogtanian and the Three Muskehounds (KK 0003) | 22 July 1991 | "Dogtanian's Journey"; "Dogtanian Meets the Black Moustache" |

=== DVD releases ===
The series has been released on DVD in the UK by Revelation Films in Region 0 format:

- Episodes 1–9: 28 April 2003
- Episodes 10–15: 25 August 2003
- Episodes 16–20: 22 March 2004
- Episodes 21–26: 25 May 2004
- Dogtanian - The Complete Series Boxset: 20 September 2004
- The television films Dogtanian: Special and Dogtanian: One For All And All For One: 26 July 2004.

In November 2010, a version that contains both series and both television films was released exclusively to HMV. The complete boxset was later made available at other retailers.

The complete series was released on DVD in the U.S. in 2012 by Oasis DVDs.

=== Streaming ===
The series can be found on different platforms such as YouTube, Netflix and ITVX in the United Kingdom.

=== Soundtrack ===
The original version of the soundtrack to Dogtanian (called Dartacan Soundtrack) can be downloaded from Amazon's UK website in MP3 format. It includes an English version of the theme song that uses the second series opening lyrics, but the music is similar to the original opening. In this version Dogtanian is referred to as Dartacan, his Spanish name, and the theme is sung with high voices, similar to the original opening, and rendered in a style reminiscent of the French dub. It includes insert song in Spanish which has been replicated twice (Richelieu and Bulibu, probably an error on Amazon's part or that of the record company) and a few instrumental tracks that are heard in the show itself and one unused instrumental track.

== Television film ==
In 1985, BRB Internacional released a television film edited from the series entitled Dogtanian: Special.

== Sequel ==
In 1989 a sequel series entitled The Return of Dogtanian was produced by BRB Internacional, Televisión Española and Thames Television with animation of Wang Film Productions and Morning Sun Animation. The outsourcing had changed a few years earlier due to a price hike at Nippon Animation. Like the first series, 26 episodes were produced.

In 1995, BRB Internacional released a television film edited from this second series entitled Dogtanian: One For All and All For One.

== Film ==
BRB Internacional was planning a new feature-length CGI film and was originally planned to be released in 2016, but was delayed for unknown reasons. In April 2019, Apolo Films, their new cinema studio, took over production of the film. The film was written by Doug Langdale and directed by Toni Garcia. The film was released in theaters under the title Dogtanian and the Three Muskehounds. It was released on SVOD.

The film maintains the original series opening main theme tune composed by Guido and Maurizio De Angelis. Additionally, they have composed new songs for the film.

The film was released in the United Kingdom on 25 June 2021.
