= Button Nose =

1985 Japanese animated TV series

夢の星のボタンノーズ (Yume no Hoshi no Botan Nōzu)
- Anime television series

Yume no Hoshi no Button Nose
- Directed by: Masami Hata
- Produced by: Shinji Nabeshima; Tsunemasa Hatano
- Written by: Hideo Takayashiki; Keiji Terui; Kenji Terada; Tomoko Konparu
- Music by: Kohei Tanaka; English version: Shuki Levy & Kussa Mahchi
- Studio: Sanrio; Topcraft Limited Company
- Original network: ANN (ABC, TV Asahi)
- English network: AU: Network Ten, Fox Kids; NZ: TV2
- Original run: 19 October 1985 – 26 April 1986
- Episodes: 26

Button Nose (夢の星のボタンノーズ, Yume no Hoshi no Botan Nōzu; also known as Dream-Star Button Nose) is a 26-episode Japanese animated TV series that aired from 19 October 1985 to 26 April 1986. The series takes place in a fairy tale and science fiction setting and follows the protagonist Button Nose as she finds out she is descended from royalty. It was the first TV series produced by Sanrio.

== Background ==
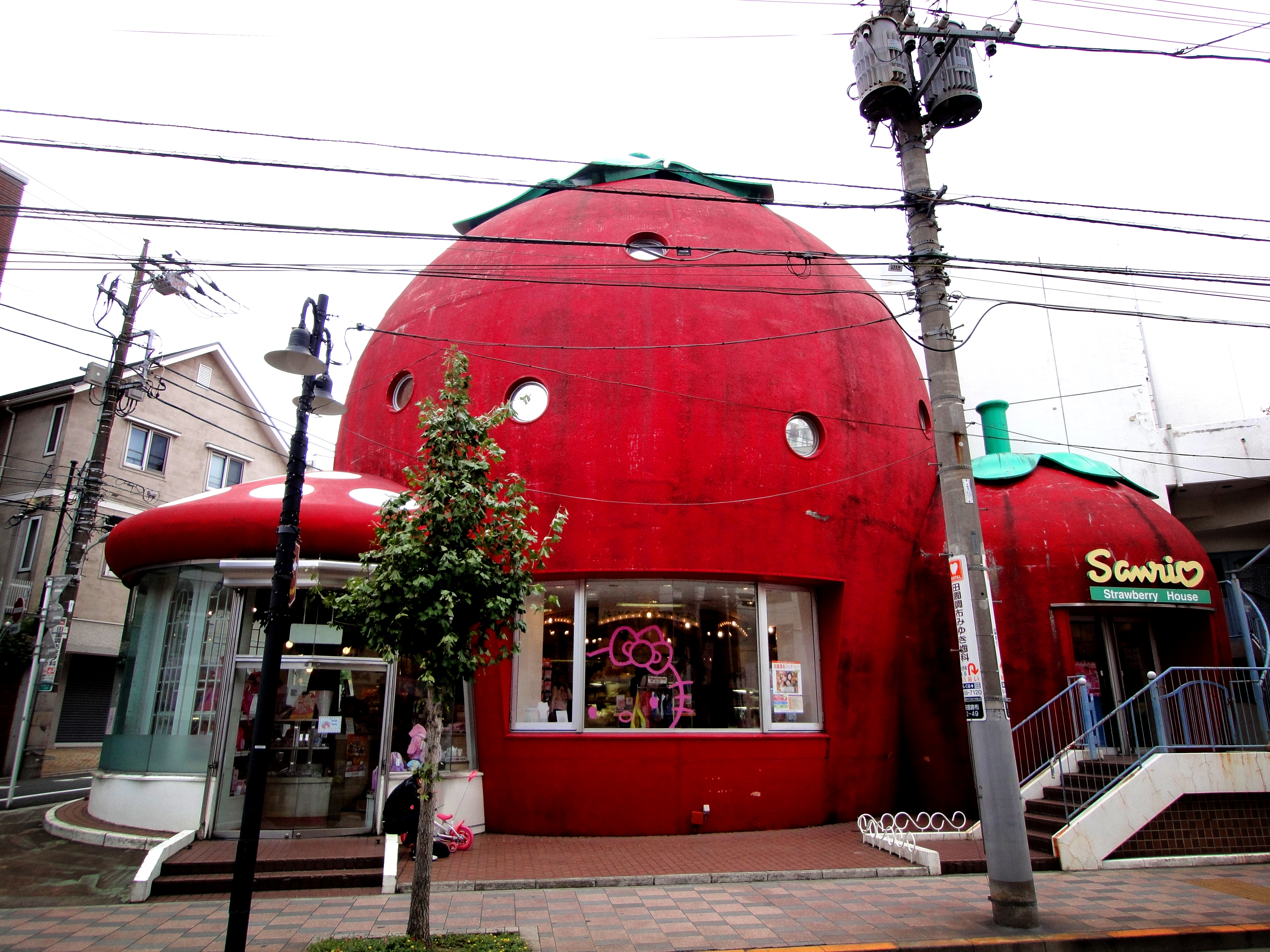
In 1983, Sanrio built a store based on the fictional home of Button Nose

The Button Nose character was originally designed by Masayo Hirose (広瀬昌代) for Sanrio, and introduced in 1978. Sanrio's character profiles portray Button Nose as a sweet and lively girl, who makes strawberry jam and likes cookies. She is called Button Nose because her nose is small and round.

In 1983, Sanrio built a strawberry shaped store based on the fictional home of Button Nose. Located in Tokyo, the store was originally planned to be in place for a limited time, but due to positive customer response it remained in operation until 2011.

== Production ==
Button Nose was animated by Topcraft Limited Company and was the first TV series produced by Sanrio.

Music for the series was composed by Kohei Tanaka and was his first anime music score of many. Shirō Sasaki participated as Tanaka's assistant.

The animation production of the series was completed in 1983, but the actual broadcast date was two years later.

An English dub was produced by Saban Entertainment in 1994.

== Characters ==
Button Nose
Button Nose is the main protagonist. She's a young schoolgirl who usually wears red overalls, striped yellow and blue long-sleeved shirt and leggings, red shoes, and two strawberry hairclips on either side of her head. She appears in official art as blonde with a purple dress and one hairclip, but in the show she has two, bright orange hair, black beady eyes, and a small button nose where she gets her nickname from. She is very curious, extroverted, and excited easily. She is rarely ever sad or startled for long and gets cheered up quickly when she is. She enjoys making friends and helping her parents at their strawberry observatory on Earth, where she's from originally. She was supposed to give an order of strawberry seedlings to Ticktackbon, who was sent by Duke Fastener from the planet Calint, but got too excited by the idea of space and got on the return spaceship with Ticktackbon. She quickly becomes friends with Scooter after he saves her from crash-landing the ship, and Prince Flower after arriving at the castle. She finds out she's the niece of Duke Fastener after getting in trouble for crashing the ship. She is crowned queen of Hookland temporarily after Fastener goes on a trip to explore space.
Franklin
Franklin is a rodent-like creature of debated species and a pet of Button Nose. He is pinkish purple with the ears and face of a mouse but the body of a kangaroo or aardvark. He is loyal to Button Nose and often accompanies the group on their adventures, partaking as if he was a human too. He has a girlfriend, which is a fluffy white cat that wears a red bow around her neck, whom he asked out by giving her a glass slipper. His enemy is Pierces' cat who he often fights and squabbles with. He is known as Howie the house-mouse in the English dub.
Ticktackbon
Ticktackbon is a servant robot created by Duke Fastener. He is small and egg-shaped with a red and yellow lower half and a blue glass upper half that sparkles when he speaks. He has retractable gray arms and white gloves. When he gets startled or yells his 'face' displays yellow flashing lights. He is responsible for waking Button Nose and Prince Flower in the mornings and making sure they're doing their duties, which makes him slightly annoying to them though they still see him as a reliable friend. Even though he is a robot, he wishes to have a mother like everyone else. He is known as Rudy in the English dub.
Duke Fastener
Duke Fastener is actually the king of Hookland, despite his title of "Duke". He is also the uncle of Button Nose, and the father of Prince Flower. At first, Button Nose imagines him as strict and intimidating, but once she meets him she finds out he is actually cheerful and friendly. He is bald on the top of his head with only tufts of grey hair on the sides. His defining feature is his large bushy mustache. He often wears a royal purple robe with white fur trimming, and a large strawberry-shaped crown that he later gives to Button Nose. It was his dream for years to explore space, so once Button Nose was able to take care of the kingdom he left suddenly to explore but with terrible timing, as he left in the middle of a crisis. He is known as King Krumpet in the English dub.
Prince Flower
Prince Flower is the only son of Duke Fastener and cousin of Button Nose. He has poofy greenish blue hair and looks similar to Button Nose. He wears a blue princely outfit with a purple cape, black oval glasses, and his royal crown. He has a matter-of-fact, calm, and neutral personality, though he still shows when he's happy or upset. His favourite activity is baking bread, though he always fails as it either turns out way too sticky, hard as cement, or the entire oven just explodes. His second favourite hobby is reading, which makes him very smart and helpful to Button Nose on their adventures. They sometimes use his failed attempts at making bread to help them in difficult situations. He is known as Prince Percy in the English dub.
Chamberlain
Chamberlain is Duke Fastener's royal butler, helper, and childhood friend. He has white hair tied into two horn-shaped pigtails on the top of his head, along with thick sideburns that lead to his mustache. He has a large bulbous nose and simple black eyes. He often wears a black suit with a red tie and white undershirt. He is responsible for caring for Button Nose and Prince Flower while Fastener is away, though he is hesitant to accompany them on their adventures as he is easily scared and does not want to be involved with anything dangerous, so he often sends Clip to go with them in his place. He is protective over Fastener and his kingdom, always making sure Fastener is well and the kingdom stays out of danger. He is known as Malcolm in the English dub.
Clip
Clip is the 'bad boy' of the town and a reliable friend of Button Nose and Prince Flower. He is tall and slim with untamed brown hair parted by his blue bowler hat. He wears a light purple long sleeved shirt with a red vest, blue jeans, and blue buckle shoes. His most prized possession is his red motorcycle, which he spends most of his time fixing and driving. He is intelligent but casual, acts like the average teenage boy, and speaks in a blunt manner with more slang than the others. He frequently helps get Button Nose and Prince Flower out of dangerous situations and accompanies them on their adventures, though he is often annoyed by their tendency to cause trouble. He works at a downtown dry-cleaning shop alongside his mother and an implied girlfriend he occasionally references. He is known as Scooter in the English dub.
Lady Bracelet
Lady Bracelet is the Countess of Hookland, sister of Fastener, and second main antagonist. She is tall and pale with orange-blonde hair tied into a bun. She wears fancy makeup - mascara, blue eyeshadow, and bold red lipstick. She usually wears large gold earrings, a floor-length black dress, red sleek gloves, a white fur boa, and a black and red sunhat. She is snobby and arrogant but cunning and good at persuasion, though the children never fall for her schemes. She is often seen with her daughter, Pierce, who she intends to marry off to Prince Flower to gain power over the kingdom. Prince Flower however is oblivious to her plan, shows no interest in her daughter, and somehow always accidentally avoids the marriage. She is known as Countess Upstuck in the English dub.
Pierce
Pierce is the only daughter of Lady Bracelet. She has a blonde pixie cut with small curls, a short purple dress, and knee-high red boots. She is similar in height to Button Nose and Prince Flower. Like her mother, she has a twisted personality, is hostile to Button Nose, and is a good manipulator. Her personality, however, seems to be more influenced by her mother, who often encourages her bad behaviour. She occasionally is tempted to help Button Nose when she's in danger, but gets told by her mother not to. She has a black cat named Soil that is enemies with Franklin who she is often seen carrying around. She is known as Alicia in the English dub.
Vongole Bianco
Bianco is the older brother of the Vongole Brothers and the first main antagonist along with his brother. He is round-faced with a large nose, small mustache, and a black buzzcut hidden by his black hat. He wears a simple black suit with a navy blue undershirt. The pattern on his hat and bowtie is white. His goal is to be rich and powerful, and he'll do anything he can to achieve it. He is very controlling and treats his brother as below him. He is known as Bernie in the English dub.
Vongole Rosso
Rosso is the younger brother of the Vongole Brothers and the first main antagonist along with his brother. He looks and dresses the exact same as Bianco except the pattern on his hat and bowtie is red. He is weak, easily controlled and influenced by Bianco, but shares the same dream of being extremely wealthy and powerful. He is known as Benny in the English dub.

== Voice Cast ==
Character	Japanese Voice Actor	English Voice Actor
Button Nose	Sanae Miyuki	Rebecca Forstadt
Franklin	Masagoro	Julie Maddalena
Ticktackbon	Akira Kamiya	Julie Maddalena
Duke Fasner	Jōji Yanami	Mike Reynolds
Countess Upstuck (Mrs. Bracelet)	Rihoko Yoshida	Morgan Lofting
Prince Flower	Shinobu Adachi	Wendee Lee
Grand Chamberlain	Hiroshi Ohtake	Simon Prescott
Clip	Kazue Komiya	Barbara Goodson
Pierce	Rei Sakuma	Julie Maddalena

== Staff ==
Planning and Concept: Atsushi Tomioka (Sanrio)
Producers: Shinji Nabeshima (Asahi Broadcasting Corporation), Tsunemasa Hatano (Sanrio)
Chief Director: Masami Hata
Original Character Design: Masayo Hirose
Character Design and Animation Supervision: Shigeru Yamamoto
Key Animators: Miwako Hattori, Etsuko Hamada, Kaoru Nakajima, Haruko Onishi, Nobuaki Wakabayashi, Masato Kimura, Masahiro Yoshida, Takashi Watanabe, Mitsuhiro Yamada, Gaku Miyao, Yukiya Senda, Tomihiko Okubo, Mitsuru Hosoya
In between Animation: Sachiko Yoneyama, Ikuichi Ito, Yukie Takahashi, Kiyoko Saito, Takayo Mizutani, Junko Amano, Masako Sakano, Hiroko Masutani
Artboards: Yukio Abe
Art Director: Kazutoshi Shimizu
Camera: Teruo Abe, Kenji Noda, Koichi Okuda, Hiroyasu Omoto
Editor: Tomoko Kida
Music: Kohei Tanaka
Sound Director: Etsuji Yamada
Sound Effects: Mitsuru Kashiwabara
Recording Engineer: Tsugio Nakatogawa
Sound Producer: Yasuo Urakami
Sound Production: Audio Planning U
Film Development: IMAGICA
Production Manager: Seiichiro Narukawa
Production Assistants: Shoji Muronaga, Naofumi Yamauchi, Yoshitaka Fujimoto, Naoyuki Oshikiri
Production Cooperation: Topcraft Limited Company
Production: Asahi Broadcasting Corporation, Sanrio
Copyright: Sanrio Co., Ltd.
