= Demetan Croaker, The Boy Frog =

Japanese anime TV series

- Cover art from the sixth French DVD volume
- けろっこデメタン
- Genre: Comedy, drama, adventure, Romance, Fantasy
- Created by: Jinzo Toriumi
- Developed by: Akiyoshi Sakai
- Directed by: Hiroshi Sasagawa
- Music by: Noshiyube Koshibe
- Opening theme: "Kerokko Dementan" by Mitsuko Horie
- Ending theme: "Makeru na Dementan" by Mitsuko Horie
- Country of origin: Japan
- Original language: Japanese
- No. of episodes: 39

Production
- Executive producer: Tatsuo Yoshida
- Producers: Ippei Kuri; Kenji Yoshida
- Editor: Sachiko Miki
- Production company: Tatsunoko Production

Original release
- Network: FNS (Fuji TV)
- Release: January 2 – September 25, 1973

Demetan Croaker, The Boy Frog (けろっこデメタン, Kerokko Demetan), also known as Demetan the Frog and The Brave Frog, is a 39-episode anime series by Tatsunoko Production that first aired in 1973.

== Overview ==
The story is about Demetan (Jonathan in the English version), a poor young frog living in Rainbow Pond with his mother and father (a toymaker), who becomes friends with a popular and sweet girl frog named Ranatan (known as Pookie and later Hilary in different English versions), despite the differences in their social standings: Ranatan is the daughter of the leader of Rainbow Pond (English name, Leopold), while Demetan and his parents are tree frogs, which make them automatic outcasts in the community. Together, Demetan and Ranatan enjoy many adventures.

Like many of Tatsunoko's series at the time (in particular its predecessor Kashi no Ki Mokku), the show was often sad, tragic and even sadistic, with Demetan having to deal with natural predators as well as the bullies who rule the pond. The well-loved theme song sung by Mitsuko Horie has a melancholy sound.

In addition to its original broadcast on Fuji TV in 1973, Kerokko Demetan was re-run on TV Tokyo in 1982, as a replacement for Don Dracula, which was pulled off the air following the bankruptcy of its production company.

== Dubs ==
The following dubs of the entire series were produced, making it popular in Latin America, Europe, and Quebec:

- Adventures on Rainbow Pond (English, released in the United States in 1990 by Harmony Gold USA)
- Démétan, la petite grenouille (French)
- La ranita Demetan (Spanish)
- La banda dei ranocchi (Italian)
- الضفدع الشجاع (Arabic), released by Agrama Films in the 1980s

== Feature-length adaptations ==
Adventures on Rainbow Pond was not the only English-language dub of the series. In 1985, Harmony Gold also produced two feature-length movie adaptations, edited from the TV series. The two movies, called The Brave Frog and The Brave Frog's Greatest Adventure, tell the entire storyline of the series in a heavily condensed form. Rebecca Forstadt portrays the voice of Pookie (Ranatan) in this version. The first movie was released on videocassette in 1994 and on DVD in 1999.

The Brave Frog was later dubbed to Spanish and released by East West DVD Entertainment in the United States in 2005, using the title La rana valiente. This version's lines and voice actors are distinct from La ranita Demetan, which suggests that these two Spanish dubs were actually produced by two different studios.

== Japanese voice actors ==
- Yuko Hisamatsu as Demetan
- Mari Okamoto as Ranatan
- Hiroshi Ohtake as Ibokichi
- Kōichi Kitamura as Amataro
- Kousei Tomita as Gyata
- Miyoko Shoji as Amako
- Shun Yashiro as Kyaru
- Yasuo Tanaka as Zari
- Haruko Kitahama as Narrator

== Extra production information ==
- Broadcaster: Fuji TV
- Planning: Tatsuo Yoshida
- Storyboard(s): Yoshiyuki Tomino
- Writer(s): Jinzo Toriumi
- Character Designer(s): Yoshitaka Amano, Tatsuo Yoshida, Masayuki Hayashi
- Music: Nobuyoshi Koshibe
