= The Littl' Bits =

Television series

- The children of The Littl' Bits, from left to right: Willibit, Lillabit, Snagglebit, Chip, Browniebit
- 森の陽気な小人たち ベルフィーとリルビット
- Created by: Tomoyuki Miyata; Shigeru Yanagawa; Tatsunoko Production
- Directed by: Masayuki Hayashi
- Music by: Takeo Watanabe
- Country of origin: Japan
- Original language: Japanese
- No. of episodes: 26

Production
- Executive producer: Kenji Yoshida
- Producers: Masanori Nakanko (Tatsunoko Production); Akira Inoue (Tatsunoko Production); Hakuo Kondo (Tokyo Channel 12); Tadashi Matsushima (Tokyu Agency); Ishi Uchiyama (Tokyu Agency)
- Production companies: Tatsunoko Production; Tokyo Channel 12

Original release
- Network: Tokyo Channel 12
- Release: January 7 – July 7, 1980

The Littl' Bits (森の陽気な小人たち ベルフィーとリルビット, Mori no Yōki na Kobitotachi: Berufi to Rirubitto; lit. Cheerful Dwarves of the Forest: Belfy & Lillibit) is a Japanese anime television series with 26 episodes, produced in 1980 by Tatsunoko Production in Japan in cooperation with Tokyo Channel 12. The series' Saban-produced English translation was featured on the American children's television network Nickelodeon as part of its Nick Jr. block from May 1, 1991, to April 30, 1995, alongside other children's anime series such as Adventures of the Little Koala, Maya the Bee, Noozles, and Grimm's Fairy Tale Classics. This dub was also shown in Australia on Network Ten, in New Zealand on TV3 and later TV2, in Canada on YTV and in the UK on BBC2 among other territories. In the interim, the series also enjoyed popularity across Europe, the Middle East and the Spanish-speaking world.

Due to their similar size and naming scheme (a creation of the English dub; no such naming scheme existed in the original version), the Littl' Bits has been compared to the Smurfs.

== Synopsis ==
The series describes the adventures of a race of little people who live in a simple village in Foothill Forest. It focuses in particular on a group of children: Lillabit, Willibit, Snagglebit, Chip, and Browniebit. Snagglebit, the spoiled son of the mayor, is enamored of the beautiful Lillabit, but she is best friends with Willibit, the moral role model and main protagonist. Thus, even though they generally get along well, Willibit and Snagglebit often butt heads, especially over Lillabit. Snagglebit usually pals around with the short-in-stature Browniebit, who is something of a coward (and is often teased by Snagglebit for this), and Chip, who idolizes Lillabit's uncle, Dr. Snoozabit, and wants to be a doctor like him.

Another frequently recurring child character is Teenybit (Willibit's younger sister), who befriends Scarybit, an ill-tempered, superstitious old woman assumed to be a witch and shunned by most of the other villagers. Teenybit can see that, under Scarybit's tough exterior, she's just a lonely old lady who needs a friend.

The children are watched over by, and often scolded by, the older Littl' Bits including the doctor Dr. Snoozabit, the wood-cutter Chopabit, the baker Bakeabit, Willibit's father Grumpabit, Helpabit, the elder Elderbit, Mayor Bossabit (Snagglebit's father), and others. Snoozabit has a tendency to drink too much, forcing his young niece, Lillabit, to watch out for him and do her best to keep him on the right track (In the American version, Snoozabit's drunkenness was rewritten as being constantly sleepy and needing a nap, hence his English name).

Dr. Snoozabit has raised Lillabit since her infancy, and has always told her that her birth parents died shortly after she was born. Not having a mother and father around occasionally depressed Lillabit, especially when she observed her friends having fun with their parents. However, in the second-to-last episode of the series, it was revealed that Lillabit's parents were in fact alive and were "Wanderbits" (descendants of the "Builderbit" race who were exiled from Foothill Forest for how they treated the animals who rose up and nearly drove them to extinction). In the end, the villagers decided to allow them to stay in Foothill Forest, and Lillabit and her parents were joyously reunited – just in time for a devastating earthquake to ravage Foothill Forest in the final episode, forcing the villagers to band together to rebuild.

When they're not involved in politics (for example, one episode in which they attempted to get their apathetic fellow villagers to vote on election day), the children spend much of their time exploring and interacting with the animals of the forest, both friendly and unfriendly, including raccoons, bears, bullfrogs, squirrels, fish, and horses. Lillabit can even speak directly with animals. They often take advantage of their animal friends for transportation, particularly Snuffly the flying squirrel and Blue the hedgehog.

The show espoused harmony between human beings and the animal kingdom. The plot in every episode of the show had an important lesson for the young audience – amongst the important issues which were addressed in the series, were responsibility, patience, prejudice, hard work and the value of family and friends.

== Home video releases ==
=== International ===
A few episodes of the show were released on VHS in the early 1990s in North America by Saban Video, distributed by Video Treasures. Three DVDs containing two episodes each were released in the United Kingdom by Boulevard Entertainment, and DVDs of the Italian and Arabic versions are also available.

== Characters ==
=== The Children ===
- Lillabit (Japanese name: ベルフィ Berufi for Belfy; alternate names: Tiptip, Belfi, Lutinette, Basma)

Voiced by: Yōko Asagami (Japanese); Anik Matern (English)

A sweet, beautiful orphan girl who lives with her uncle Dr. Snoozabit and watches over him due to his habit of drunkenness. While usually even-tempered and level-headed, Lillabit sometimes loses her temper with her uncle because of his laziness. Lillabit can speak directly to animals which includes Snuffly.

- Willibit (Japanese name: リルビット Rirubitto for Lillibit; alternate names: Tiptipon, Lutinou, Abdo)

Voiced by: Mayumi Tanaka

The moral role model and main protagonist who is Lillabit's best friend. He is brave and has a strong sense of justice but also has a tendency to act impetuously.

- Snagglebit (Japanese name: ナポレオン Naporeon for Napoleon)

Voiced by: Sachiko Chijimatsu

The spoiled son of Mayor Bossabit. He has a crush on Lillabit and considers himself to be Willibit's rival for Lillabit's affections, but he and Willibit usually get along fairly well.

- Chip (Japanese name: モッキン Mokkin)

Voiced by: Keiko Yamamoto in earlier episodes, Mizuko Arima in later episodes

One of Snagglebit's cronies, the son of Chopabit the woodcutter. He idolizes Dr. Snoozabit and became the doctor's unofficial assistant in one early episode, until he realized how much work the medical profession really involves.

- Browniebit (Japanese name:シメジール Shimejiru)

Voiced by: Sonja Ball, Keiko Enfuku

The third member of Snagglebit's gang, considerably shorter in stature than the other children. He tends to be somewhat of a coward and is often teased by Snagglebit and Chip for this.

- Teenybit (Japanese name: チュチュナ Chuchuna for Tchu-Tchuna; alternate names: Cuccuna)

Willibit's younger sister, a precocious girl and very observant for her age. Teenybit has a brave streak to rival her brother's, which sometimes gets her into trouble. She is the central character in several episodes which involve her befriending the village outcast, Scarybit.

=== The Adults ===
- Dr. Snoozabit (Japanese name: ドックリン Dokkurin for Docklin; alternate names: Daggurin)

Voiced by: Terrence Scammell (English), Kaneta Kimotsuki (Japanese)

Lillabit's uncle, the town doctor who enjoys drinking dandelion wine ("dandelion juice" in the English version). Lillabit does her best to keep him sober but often gets frustrated with him. Despite his debauchery and laziness, he is a skilled doctor and is highly respected by the citizens of Foothill Forest.

- Mayor Bossabit (Japanese name: メイモンド村長 Meimondo-sonchō; alternate names: Mr. Nemo)

Voiced by: Arthur Grosser

Snagglebit's father and the mayor of the village in Foothill Forest. He is raising Snagglebit on his own as his wife (Snagglebit's mother) died when Snagglebit was still very young. His job often leaves him little time for his son, but he loves and is very protective of Snagglebit.

- Scarybit (alternate names: Margie)

An antisocial, superstitious old woman assumed to be a witch. Initially, she seems to relish her outsider status, but she is eventually befriended by young Teenybit and is soon more accepted by the society of Foothill Forest.

- Chopabit

The wood-cutter, Chip's father. He wants his son to become a woodcutter like him, but Chip has other ambitions, which causes some friction between father and son.

- Bakeabit

The baker.

- Grumpabit

Voiced by: A.J. Henderson (English), Tetsuo Mizutori (Japanese)

Willibit and Teenybit's father. Despite his grumpy exterior, he is a very strong, kind-hearted and hard-working man who cares deeply for his family. His wife is known in the series simply as "Mrs. Grumpabit."

- Helpabit

Mayor Bossabit's live-in gardener and handyman. Helpabit is famous for his delicious honey, with its secret ingredient of nectar from the flowers known as "Blue Lovelies."

- Elderbit (Japanese name: ロンジー Ronjī)

Voiced by: Rick Jones (English), Ryuji Saikachi (Japanese)

The village's elder, sage, and teacher to the children (albeit in a non-formal capacity since there is no school per se in the series) who enjoy hearing his stories of days gone by in Foothill Forest.

=== The Animals ===
- Snuffly (Japanese name: Monga)

A flying squirrel who is Lillabit's friend and constant companion and often joins in the children's games. He doubles as a mode of transportation for Willibit and Lillabit on their adventures.

- Blue (Japanese name: Pion)

A hedgehog who is also a companion of the children.

== Episodes ==
1. "The Children's Festival" (森のこどもまつり Mori no kodomo matsuri) (January 7, 1980) – Snagglebit tries to sabotage Willibit's chances of becoming King of the Children's Festival so that he can be King to Lillabit's Queen.
2. "Doctor Snoozabit" (ベルフィーの家はお医者さん Berufi no ie wa oisha-san) (January 14, 1980) – Chip idolizes Lillabit's Uncle Snoozabit and demands to become his assistant.
3. "The Old Mill Stream" (リルビット 水車をまわせ Rirubitto suisha o mawase) (January 21, 1980) – The mill stream has dried up, preventing the Bakerbits from making goodies for a wedding, and the children investigate the cause.
4. "The Rainbow Firefly" (ベルフィー 七色ホタルを守れ Berufi nana-iro hotaru o mamore) (January 28, 1980) – Against the adults' orders, the children sneak into a cave in hopes of seeing the fabled Rainbow Firefly.
5. "Election Day" (一人ぼっちのナポ Hitoribocchi no Napo) (February 4, 1980) – It's mayoral election day, but when no one shows up at the polls to re-elect his father mayor, Snagglebit becomes distraught and runs away.
6. "Scarybit the Witch" (ブキミ森の魔女 Bukimi mori no majo) (February 11, 1980) – The children have been warned to keep clear of the mysterious old woman Scarybit, but Teenybit's curiosity gets the better of her.
7. "Winter Strawberries" (愛の冬いちご Ai no fuyu ichigo) (February 18, 1980) – Lillabit, Chip and Browniebit fall into a deathlike coma (referred to as "cold sleep") after drinking some tainted water, and Willibit and Snagglebit set out in search of the legendary Winter Strawberries, said to be the only thing that can revive their friends.
8. "The Snow Woman" (雪女が呼んでいる Yuki-onna ga yonde iru) (February 25, 1980) – When a kite-flying mishap sends Lillabit sailing away into the mountains, Willibit goes to rescue her, and the children encounter the legendary Snow Woman, who, according to legend, kidnaps disobedient children.
9. "Save the Raccoon!" (アライグマを救え Araiguma o sukue) (March 3, 1980) – Willibit and friends play in a hockey game to save the life of a young raccoon.
10. "Madame Bella the Weaver" (黄色い雪割草 Kiiroi yukiwariso) (March 10, 1980) – Lillabit stands the best chance of succeeding Madam Bella as head weaver, and Bella's jealous granddaughter, Rosiebit, is determined to make sure that does not happen.
11. "The Baby Bears" (春のお客さん Haru no okyaku-san) (March 17, 1980) – Lillabit befriends a young bear cub who is separated from his mother, but the rest of the villagers are scared of the bear.
12. "Looking at the Stars" (心が通う親子星 Kokoro ga kayou oyako boshi) (March 24, 1980) – The children's plans to erect a telescope on the sacred Mount So-High are discouraged by their parents and the village elders.
13. "Poor Old Helpabit" (花のカーニバル Hana no carnival) (March 31, 1980) – Helpabit's special honey recipe is supposed to help the mayor win the village tasting contest, but when the recipe appears to fail, Helpabit decides to leave the village in disgrace.
14. "Storm Baby" (嵐の中のうぶごえ Arashi no naka no ubu go e) (April 7, 1980) – Lillabit falls into a deep depression over her deceased mother's absence, especially when she observes her friends with their mothers.
15. "The Mystical Monument" (神殿の秘密 Shinden no himitsu) (April 14, 1980) – Tired of being called a coward, Browniebit enters the Mystical Monument in search of a magical white feather said to bring the holder great courage.
16. "Help the Squirrel" (リスの患者さん Risu no kanja-san) (April 21, 1980) – Willibit and Snagglebit injure a squirrel for stealing their picnic lunch, only to discover that she is a mother squirrel trying to feed her hungry brood. When the squirrel develops a dangerously high fever, the remorseful boys trek into the mountains for ice to save her life.
17. "The Legend of Red Light" (赤い光の伝説 Akai hikari no densetsu) (April 28, 1980) – Elderbit tells the children a story about a demonic red light in the quarry that allegedly causes cave-ins, and the children set out to see it for themselves.
18. "The Cowardly Colt" (弱虫子馬の冒険 Youwamushi kouma no bouken) (May 5, 1980) – The children embark on a journey to see horses after hearing about them from Dr. Snoozabit, and end up helping a timid young colt find his inner courage.
19. "The Strange Egg" (まよいこんだ卵 Mayoikonda tamago) (May 12, 1980) – The children find a mysterious large egg, but Willibit's parents will not let him keep the egg at his house. While carting the egg back into the forest, the kids must protect it from a hungry weasel.
20. "Let's Go to the Sea, Part 1" (青い海をめざせ Aoi umi o mezase) (May 19, 1980) – After hearing Elderbit's stories about the sea, the boys plan to journey to see it for themselves. They exclude Lillabit because she's a girl, but she's not about to be left behind.
21. "Let's Go to the Sea, Part 2" (はじめての海 Hajimete no umi) (May 26, 1980) – As the children continue their journey to the sea, their worried parents send out a search party to find them.
22. "The Red Rainbow" (虹の旅人たち Niji no tabibito-tachi) (June 2, 1980) – Seeing a red rainbow in the sky after a fierce thunderstorm, Scarybit decides to take an offering of fruit to Starlight Lake to appease the angry forest spirits.
23. "Earthquake!" (森の地震 Mori no jishin) (June 9, 1980) – Snuffly the flying squirrel runs away after being scolded by Lillabit for interfering with the children's games, and while Lillabit, Willibit and Dr. Snoozabit are searching for him, an earthquake strikes.
24. "Forget-Me-Nots" (思い出の花園 Omoide no hanazono) (June 16, 1980) – Susiebit's mother is deathly allergic to Mayor Bossabit's forget-me-not garden, so when the garden is mysteriously destroyed, Susie is the natural suspect – or is she?
25. "The Wanderbits" (幻のファニット Maboroshi no fanitto) (June 23, 1980) – Everyone wonders who the mysterious strangers are who showed up one day in Foothill Forest, and why Lillabit's uncle is taking such an interest in them. When the strangers' identity is revealed, it sends shock waves through the village.
26. "Awful, Awful Days" (ファニットの朝 Fanitto no asa) (June 30, 1980) – Lillabit has been joyously reunited with her parents, but a tragedy of epic proportions is around the corner, and the mountainside cave Grumpabit has been digging may be the only safe place.

== Cast ==
=== Japanese cast ===
- Belfy (Lillabit): Yōko Asagami
- Lillibit (Willibit): Mayumi Tanaka
- Napoleon (Snagglebit): Sachiko Chijimatsu
- Chuchuna (Teenybit): Tsuneko Shitomi
- Daggurin: Kaneta Kimotsuki
- Ronji (Elderbit): Ryuji Saikachi
- Mayor Meimondo (Mayor Bossabit): Minoru Nishio
- Narrator: Toshiko Maeda

NOTE: It is often mistakenly believed by Westerners that the Japanese "Belfy" and the English "Willibit" are the same character, and that the Japanese "Lillibit" and the English "Lillabit" are the same character. In fact, "Belfy" is the name of the female, not the male, lead of the series in the original Japanese, and "Lillibit" is the male, not the female, lead. This can be confirmed by consulting the English-language section of Tatsunoko Productions' Website.

=== English cast ===
- Sonja Ball – Browniebit
- Arthur Grosser – Mayor Bossabit
- Dean Hagopian -
- A.J. Henderson – Grumpabit
- Arthur Holden – Snagglebit
- Rick Jones – Elderbit
- Liz MacRae – Willibit
- Walter Massey – Narrator
- Anik Matern – Lillabit
- Terrence Scammell – Dr. Snoozabit
- Jane Woods – Additional Voices
- Rachelle Cano – Lead Vocal Opening and Closing Themes

== Staff ==
Japanese Version (Belfy & Lillibit)

- Created by: Shigeru Yanagawa, Tomoyuki Miyata, Tatsunoko Production
- Executive Producer: Kenji Yoshida
- Planning: Tatsunoko Production Planning Team, Tokyu Agency
- Production Supervisor: Ryoichi Yamada, Masakazu Fujii
- Chief Director: Masayuki Hayashi
- Episode Director: Masayuki Hayashi, Norio Yazawa, Shinichi Tsuji, Mizuho Nishikubo, Hiroshi Iwata, Hideo Furusawa, Masakazu Higuchi, Shigeru Omachi
- Screenplay/Storyboards: Akiyoshi Sakai, Naoko Miyake, Takao Koyama, Yoshiko Takagi, Yu Yamamoto, Shigeru Yanagawa, Yuji Suzuki, Osamu Sekiguchi, Norio Yazawa, Masayuki Hayashi
- Music: Takeo Watanabe
- Character Design: Akiko Shimomoto, Hiromitsu Morita
- Animation Director: Hiromitsu Morita, Hayao Nobe
- Theme Song Performance: Kumiko Oosugi (OP– Mori he Oide Yo; ED– Oyasumi Chuchuna)
- Camera: Studio Gallop
- Laboratory: Orient Laboratory (now IMAGICA)
- Broadcaster: Tokyo 12 Channel (7 January to 7 July 1980)
- Production: Tatsunoko Production Co., Ltd.

English Version (The Littl' Bits)

- Script: Michael McConnohie (episode 2)
- Music: Haim Saban, Shuki Levy
- Associate Producer: Eric S. Rollman
- Executive Producer: Jerald E. Bergh
- Producer: Winston Richard
- Supervising Producer: Winston Richard
- Supervising Writer: Robert V. Barron
- Voice Director: Tim Reid
- Opening and Closing Theme Vocalist: Rachelle Cano
