= Crimson Wolf =

1993 anime by Shoichi Masuo

紅狼 (Hon Ran)
- Genre: Adventure, science fiction
- Original video animation
- Directed by: Shoichi Masuo
- Studio: A.P.P.P.
- Licensed by: UK: Manga Entertainment; US: Streamline Pictures
- Released: July 7, 1993
- Runtime: 59 minutes
- icon

Crimson Wolf (Japanese: 紅狼, Hepburn: Hon Ran; pinyin: Hóng Láng) is an anime written and animated by Shoichi Masuo.

== Plot ==
Three warriors battle the forces of darkness when an archaeological expedition unleashes an ancient prophecy.

== English cast ==
- Barbara Goodson as Mizuo Mashio
- Bob Bergen as Kai
- Dan Woren as Brukodan
- Kerrigan Mahan
- Kirk Thornton
- Jeff Winkless
- Richard Cansino
