= Lisa Michelson =

American actress (1958–1991)

- Born: Lisa Paulette Michelson; March 31, 1958
- Died: September 14, 1991 (aged 33); Los Angeles, California, U.S.
- Occupation: Voice actress
- Years active: 1980–1991
- Spouse: Gregory Snegoff

Lisa Paulette Michelson (March 31, 1958 – September 14, 1991) was an American voice actress. She was best known for providing the voices of Satsuki Kusakabe in the Streamline Pictures dub of My Neighbor Totoro and Kiki in the Streamline dub of Kiki's Delivery Service.

She also provided the voices for Rasa in The World of the Talisman, Addy in Zillion, the Android Girl in the "Presence" segment of Robot Carnival and additional voices in Fist of the North Star Movie.

She was sometimes credited as or Lisa Michaelson or Lisa Snegoff. She was married to Gregory Snegoff until her death sustained in a car accident in Los Angeles, California on September 14, 1991. The end credits of the American localization of Robot Carnival are dedicated to her.

== Filmography ==
- The Date (1977, 16mm classroom film, The Little Red Filmhouse Pictures)
- My Neighbor Totoro (1988, Satsuki Kusakabe) (Streamline Pictures)
- Kiki's Delivery Service (1989, Kiki) (Streamline Pictures)
- Grimm's Fairy Tale Classics (1989) - Nana Doris (Snow White), Josephine (Bluebeard), Princess Alea (The Coat of Many Colors) (Saban Entertainment)
- Mama's Family (November 25, 1989 as Snake) in Ep. 120 "Bubba's House Band"
