= Lily C.A.T. =

1987 science fiction/horror anime film by Hisayuki Toriumi

- Theatrical poster

リリー・C.A.T. (Rirī C.A.T.)
- Genre: Cosmic horror
- Original video animation
- Directed by: Hisayuki Toriumi
- Produced by: Isamu Senda
- Written by: Hisayuki Toriumi
- Music by: Akira Inoue
- Studio: Studio Pierrot
- Licensed by: NA: Discotek Media
- Released: September 1, 1987
- Runtime: 67 minutes
- icon

Lily C.A.T. (Japanese: リリー・C.A.T., Hepburn: Rirī C.A.T.) is a 1987 Japanese cosmic horror anime film written and directed by Hisayuki Toriumi, featuring monster designs from Yoshitaka Amano and character designs from Yasuomi Umetsu. An English version of the film was produced by Carl Macek and distributed by Streamline Pictures. After the closing of Streamline Pictures, the distribution rights were obtained by Discotek Media. The film is heavily inspired by Ridley Scott's Alien and by John Carpenter's The Thing.

== Plot ==
In the 23rd century, companies are now surveying distant planets for mining rights. The Syncam Corporation is investigating a relatively new planet and has hired deep-space cruiser Saldes to shuttle company surveyors to investigate. The employees consist of Jiro Takagi of the Japanese division, Dick Berry of the Australian division, the president's daughter Nancy, Farrah Van Dorothy, Morgan W. Scott, Jimmy, and Dr. Harris Mead, while the crew consists of Captain Mike Hamilton, his subordinates Dular, Walt, and Carolyn, and mechanics Guy and Watts. In addition, Nancy has brought her cat, Lily, on board. The ship allows its passengers to go into hypersleep for 20 years and only biologically age one year.

During the voyage, the ship's computer detects debris flying through space and collects a sample, which causes the extraterrestrial matter to become loose in the ship while the crew and the surveyors are in cryogenic sleep. Upon awakening, the crew learns that two of the surveyors are impostors, but a bigger problem emerges when Morgan is found dead from a mysterious infection. Dr. Mead, Lily, Guy, and Watts also perish from what appears to be a bacterial infection, which dissolves the bodies of its victims, but leaves their clothes intact. During this, Berry attempts to discover who the impostors are by checking their backgrounds.

The bacteria quickly evolves into a hostile life-form capable of mimicking the form of its human victims and kills Dorothy in the sickbay. The computer controls are also overrun by an unknown entity, which results in the deaths of Dular and Walt. Back in sickbay, Jiro and Berry are revealed to be the impostors when Jiro gives an explanation for the bacteria. Jiro is a medical student who murdered three drug dealers who he held responsible for his sister's death from an overdose and Berry is a detective determined to bring him in. Berry handcuffs Jiro, though Hamilton warns Berry that because decades have passed since the murders, no one else is interested in Jiro being brought to justice.

Hamilton reveals that because of decades spent in cryo suspension while on deep space missions, he is two hundred and forty years old. Carolyn is a hundred and fifty-one; the rest of his crew were between one hundred and fifty to two hundred. Through his own tragic past, he explains that after completing a mission, he would return home to find family and friends had either aged or died. His own son, whom he had met after last seeing him as a baby, was now an adult older than him. Hamilton then realized that he could not adapt to the new trends and culture of the period in which he lived and that he was treated as a nuisance, an 'old fossil', as he put it. The only escape was to return to space.

The survivors soon confront the bacteria, which results in Berry getting injured from the recoil of his shotgun. Hamilton and Jimmy create flamethrowers to deal with the bacteria, though Jimmy and Carolyn are quickly killed. Hamilton manages to survive and discovers that a robotic replica of Nancy's cat known as "The Master" or Lily-C.A.T., a Computerized Animal-shaped Technological robot, is responsible for taking over the ship. He then realizes that Syncam wanted to study the bacteria with no concern for the lives of the human crew. Meanwhile, Berry holds a grudge against Jiro because the murders prevented the police from shutting down the dealer's drug ring and cost him a promotion.

Nancy later suffers a nervous breakdown and reveals that the only reason she came on the mission was to maintain her youth and looks after returning to Earth. She planned to show this to her former friend, whom she harbored resentment towards, knowing that by then her friend would be older and envious.

Hamilton, Jiro, Nancy, and Berry flee to the main bridge, where Berry dies from the infection. Jiro keeps the handcuffs that Berry had attached to his wrists, as a memento of duty, honouring Berry for still doing his job even at the verge of death. In a fit of defeatism, Jiro attempts suicide, until Hamilton reveals a shuttle he stored. Hamilton proceeds to destroy the ship by letting out the hydrogen and setting off a lighter, while Jiro and Nancy escape to the planet below them; the remaining bacteria forms a large creature and attaches itself to the shuttle but burns up in the atmosphere. It is left unclear if Jiro and Nancy are infected, but in a final speech Jiro states that like the cocoon becomes a butterfly, they must accept the fate of becoming a creature, if that is their fate. In the in-credits sequence, Jiro's handcuffs, which he had been attached to, are dropped to the ground, implying that either he got free from them or had transformed himself into the creature.

== Cast ==
Character	Japanese version	English version
Jiro Takagi	Hiroyuki Okita	Bob Bergen
Nancy Strauch	Masako Katsuki	Julie Maddalena
Captain Mike Hamilton	Osamu Saka	Mike Reynolds
Dick Berry	Chikao Ohtsuka	Gregory Snegoff
Farrah Van Dorothy	Eiko Yamada	J.C. Henning
Dülar Delcassé	Hiroshi Ōtake	Steve Kramer
Gott Walt Coup	Hideyuki Tanaka	Richard Cansino
Guy Alcuin	Kōzō Shioya	Russel Case
Wat Tyler	Shigeru Chiba	Kerrigan Mahan
Morgan W. Scott	Tesshō Genda	Steve Bulen
Carolyn	Yoshiko Sakakibara	Iona Morris
Dr. Harris Mead	Mahito Tsujimura	Clifton Wells
Jimmy Mengel	Ryōichi Tanaka	Michael Sorich
Syncam Personnel Managar	Masashi Hirose	Tom Wyner

== Reception ==
Eric Vilas-Boas for Vulture ranked it as one of the best horror anime ever made.
