= Robotech: Love Live Alive =

2013 American animated film

- Australian DVD cover
- Directed by: Gregory Snegoff
- Screenplay by: Gregory Snegoff
- Story by: Carl Macek; Tommy Yune
- Based on: Genesis Climber Mospeada: Love Live Alive by Katsuhisa Yamada and Sukehiro Tomita
- Produced by: Frank Agrama; Carl Macek; Tommy Yune
- Starring: Cam Clarke
- Narrated by: J. Jay Smith
- Cinematography: Kazunori Hashimoto
- Edited by: Tommy Yune
- Music by: Arlon Ober; Ulpio Minucci
- Production companies: Harmony Gold USA; Tatsunoko Production; Artmic (original version, uncredited); Big Star Enterprise; Ragex Animation
- Distributed by: A&E; Lionsgate
- Release date: July 23, 2013
- Running time: 90 minutes
- Countries: United States; Japan
- Language: English

Robotech: Love Live Alive is a 2013 American direct-to-video animated film produced by Harmony Gold USA. Part of the Robotech franchise, it is based on the 1985 Japanese OVA music video Genesis Climber MOSPEADA: Love Live Alive. The film follows soldier and musician Lancer as he recounts the events of the Third Robotech War ahead of a concert performance.

== Plot ==
In the year 2044, a news reporter named Kay interviews Lancer a few hours before his scheduled concert. Lancer recalls the events leading to the Third Robotech War, along with his prior involvement with the 10th Mars Division and his association with the band of rebels that helped defeat the Invid forces. After the interview, he starts his concert with a rendition of Lynn Minmei's "We Will Win".

Following the concert, as Lancer sits alone at night and only thinks to himself, he is surprised by his returning family. Scott, Marlene/Ariel, Rand, Rook, Lunk, and Annie all take him out for a campfire dinner and talk about what the REF has been up to in the aftermath of Robotech: The Shadow Chronicles. Lancer declines an invitation from Scott and Rand to join them on the fleet's new mission to find Admiral Hunter and the SDF-3, giving his own valid reason as they all head off for some sleep. Lancer remains awake and leaves his family behind. He drives through the country while back at his small cabin, Sera prepares breakfast for her returning love. As he returns, Lancer and Sera reaffirm their devotion and Sera reveals to him that she is expecting their first child soon.

== Cast ==
- Frank Catalano as Rand
- Cam Clarke as Lancer
- Richard Epcar as Lunk
- Barbara Goodson as Sera
- Alexandra Kenworthy as the Regess
- Steve Kramer as Dimitry
- Wendee Lee as Kay
- Suzy London as Rook
- Tony Oliver as Admiral Hunter
- J. Jay Smith as the narrator
- Gregory Snegoff as Scott Bernard
- Tom Wyner as Jonathan Wolfe

=== Uncredited cast (flashbacks) ===
- Emilie Brown as Annie
- Bill Capizzi as General Reinhardt
- Melanie MacQueen as Ariel / Marlene
- Melissa Newman as Dana Sterling
- Michael Sorich as Sparks
- Paul St. Peter as Zor

== Background ==
First revealed in late 2011 in the final minutes of Carl Macek's Robotech Universe, a documentary on the making of Robotech dedicated to the then-recent passing of Macek, Robotech: Love Live Alive was planned as an adaptation of the 1985 Genesis Climber MOSPEADA OVA, Love Live Alive, incorporating some brand new animation.

== Release ==
The film was initially released in the United States as part of a 2-movie collection with Robotech: The Shadow Chronicles on July 23, 2013 by Lionsgate Home Entertainment. That same year, Lionsgate also included the film on its Robotech: The Complete Set 20-disc collection, which included the original Japanese language OVA, a supplemental documentary title The Making of Love, Live, Alive, as well as deleted scenes with commentary. It was released as a standalone DVD in Australia on August 1, 2013 by Beyond Home Entertainment. It was released in the U.K. on January 27, 2014 by Revelation Films.

The film has not been re-released since 2014, and has never been made officially available for streaming. As of January 25, 2021, it was removed from Harmony Gold's publicly viewable catalog of films and TV series.

== Reception ==
Starburst wrote: "If you’re a hardcore Robotech fan, you know the story already and will find little of interest here. Casual fans will simply become bored and confused."
