= Robotech: The Shadow Chronicles =

2006 animated film

- Film poster
- Directed by: Tommy Yune; Dong-wook Lee; Yeun-Sook Seo (co-director)
- Screenplay by: Ford Riley; Frank Agrama
- Story by: Thomas J. Bateman; Steve Yun; Tommy Yune
- Based on: Robotech by Carl Macek
- Produced by: Frank Agrama; Alan Letz; Jason Netter; Ippei Kuri; Kouki Narushima
- Starring: Richard Epcar; Eddie Frierson; Mark Hamill; Alexandra Kenworthy; Yuri Lowenthal; Melanie MacQueen; Chase Masterson; Edie Mirman; Iona Morris; Tony Oliver; Arthur Santiago; Gregory Snegoff; Michael Sorich; Kari Wahlgren; Dan Woren
- Edited by: David W. Foster
- Music by: Scott Glasgow; Ulpio Minucci (main theme)
- Production companies: Harmony Gold USA; DR Movie; Tatsunoko Productions
- Distributed by: Funimation
- Release dates: August 25, 2006 (New York City); January 5, 2007
- Running time: 88 minutes
- Countries: United States; South Korea; Japan
- Language: English

Robotech: The Shadow Chronicles is the 2006 animated sequel to the 1985 Robotech television series. It was released on DVD on February 6, 2007.

The project was originally announced at Anime Expo by Harmony Gold USA on July 6, 2002, as an unnamed new animated series already under negotiation at a major network with a target date of 2004. Prior to this announcement in 1998, Harmony Gold USA had relinquished their rights to create a sequel based on the original Japanese series of which Robotech was based on. However, rights to produce a Robotech sequel using designs derived from Super Dimension Cavalry Southern Cross, and Genesis Climber MOSPEADA (and excluding Super Dimension Fortress Macross) were restored just eight days prior to this announcement.

It was revealed at Anime Expo 2004 that this project would instead be a feature-length film titled Robotech: Shadow Force and set to be released in 2005. Due to the term "Shadow Force Megazord" having been trademarked by Saban for use in its Power Rangers series in 2001, the title of the film was changed to Robotech: The Shadow Chronicles shortly thereafter.

The screenplay went through numerous writers, including noted science fiction author Robert J. Sawyer in 2003, before landing its final screenwriter, Ford Riley, in July 2004. Due to Harmony Gold USA's agreement with Tatsunoko Production not allowing their sequel to reference characters or designs from Super Dimension Fortress Macross, only one character from that series used in Robotech was included, with another appearing in a deleted scene. Both had drastically altered appearances from how they originally appeared.

The cast recorded the script initially in the fall of 2004 with later pick-ups done in 2005, including the addition of cast member Yuri Lownenthal, as well as re-casting Alexandra Kenworthy back in her original role as The Regis.

Animation was primarily handled by the South Korean studio DR Movie, with Harmony Gold USA first showing pre-renders in January 2005. The film was completed on January 27, 2006.

== Plot ==
In June 2044, the Robotech Expeditionary Force (REF) fleet gathers at Moon Base ALUCE for its final attempt to drive the alien Invid from the Earth. Among the REF fighter pilots are Maia Sterling, Marcus Rush and Alex Romero, all of whom were born in space during the REF mission and have never seen Earth. General Reinhardt sends Vince Grant, captain of the Icarus, on a rescue mission to look for Rick Hunter, chief military commander of all REF forces and a legendary veteran of the First Robotech War.

Despite not having a powerful arsenal, General Reinhardt begins the attack. The assault initially goes well until the Invid Regis launches all of her remaining forces in one final wave. When Reinhardt tries to get an update from the ground forces, he makes contact with resistance leader Scott Bernard. Scott informs Reinhardt that the attack is going poorly. Ending the communication, Scott meets with Ariel, an Invid princess that looks like a young human woman, and Scott's love interest. Ariel hopes to convince her mother, the Invid Regis, that the humans and the Invid can live in peace. As the battle rages on, Ariel finally convinces her mother to leave Earth rather than allow both races to be destroyed. Ariel, after using her teleportation power to travel to Moon Base ALUCE, informs Scott that she had a vision. The Children of the Shadow are planning on attacking the REF. Scott is arrested and interrogated, where he warns of the impending attack.

Suddenly, all contact with Space Station Liberty is lost. When the Icarus arrives, Liberty is under attack by a large fleet of alien ships which have jammed all communications. The battle is going poorly for the REF; capital ships are being destroyed with just one hit. It then becomes clear that the Haydonites are in fact the Children of the Shadow, and that Ariel's warning was true. Captain Grant realizes that every piece of technology the Haydonites have given to the REF contains some kind of Trojan Horse. Unable to restore communications, Grant is unable to warn the remaining ships of these findings, and they are left to fight a hopeless battle.

Louie searches for ships that have no Shadow technology but finds only one: the massive colony ship Ark Angel. Vince orders the evacuation of all station personnel to the Ark Angel. Liberty has the remaining stockpile of Neutron-S missiles, and Vince sets one to self-destruct. The Ark Angel is able to depart as planned. The Haydonites move their fleet towards Liberty as the Neutron-S warheads detonate, destroying Liberty and the entire Haydonite fleet.

As the Ark Angel approaches Earth, Maia and Marcus console each other over the recent events. General Reinhardt gives Vince his new orders: Vince and his crew are to take the Ark Angel and attempt to locate the SDF-3, which may not have been destroyed as initially thought. As Scott and Ariel share a kiss, Louie does his best to reassure a confused and uncertain Janice that "We will win."

== Cast ==
- Richard Epcar as Vince Grant and Haydonite
- Eddie Frierson as Dr. Louis Nichols and Haydonite
- Mark Hamill as Commander Taylor and Haydonite
- Alexandra Kenworthy as The Regis
- Yuri Lowenthal as Marcus Rush
- Melanie MacQueen as Marlene Rush
- Chase Masterson as Janice Em
- Edie Mirman as Maia Sterling
- Iona Morris as Dr. Jean Grant
- Tony Oliver as Admiral Hunter
- Arthur Santiago as Alex Romero
- Gregory Snegoff as Scott Bernard and Haydonite
- Michael Sorich as Sparks
- Kari Wahlgren as Ariel
- Dan Woren as General Reinhardt and Haydonite

== Release status ==
=== Theatrical ===
Robotech: The Shadow Chronicles premiered at the Cannes Film Market on May 22, 2006, in the Grey One Theatre to an audience of distribution representatives. Its first screening to the public was on August 12, 2006, at MechaCon 2.0 in Lafayette, Louisiana in where all proceeds went to relief for those who suffered from Hurricane Katrina. Afterwards, a number of independent film festivals screened the film during the following summer and fall. It was awarded Best Animated Sci-Fi Feature at the International Horror and Sci-Fi Film Festival.

=== Home video ===
Despite being completed in January 2006, the film had yet to find a distributor for over six months. According to an editor of the anime magazine Protoculture Addicts when answering a fan's letter asking about it, they claimed to know of at least one company who wanted to distribute it, however Harmony Gold USA wanted "too much money for it."

Harmony Gold USA announced a deal with Funimation Entertainment (later Crunchyroll, LLC) to release the film at the 2006 San Diego Comic-Con and shortly afterwards announced a release date for November 2006. This release date was quickly pushed back in August 2006, citing Funimation's desire for a limited theatrical run prior to the DVD release, as well as to give the DVD a better window for placement on big box store shelves.

Harmony Gold USA and Funimation Entertainment finally released Robotech: The Shadow Chronicles on DVD on February 6, 2007. A 2-disc collector's edition with additional features was announced by FUNimation at Anime Expo 2007 and released on DVD November 20, 2007. The Blu-ray version was released on September 4, 2008. It is currently available for streaming on Crunchyroll in the US.

Madman Entertainment in Australia was the first international distributor to license and release Robotech: The Shadow Chronicles. The film was released on Region 4 DVD on March 14, 2007.

Revelation Films released the film in the United Kingdom on July 23, 2007.

Guangdong Qianhe Audio & Video released the single-disc Standard Edition in the People's Republic of China on August 20, 2007, and the 2-disc Collector's Edition on May 1, 2008.

Funimation announced in October 2019 that they have licensed the Robotech series, Robotech: The Shadow Chronicles and Robotech II: The Sentinels. Funimation began streaming them on August 24, 2021.

== Music ==
The musical score was composed by Scott Glasgow, and was recorded with the Prague Philharmonic Orchestra. However, budgetary issues resulted in synthesized elements being mixed into a number of the cues, particularly four of the tracks in the film, and one of the tracks on the soundtrack CD ("Dogfight"). Chase Masterson sang the parts for her robotic character Janice. Melissa Kaplan, the lead singer of the band Universal Hall Pass, vocalized some of the background music.

== Reception ==
Robotech: The Shadow Chronicles has received mixed reception from fans and critics. Justin Sevakis of the Anime News Network gave it an overall rating of C-, commenting that while the movie had good music, it suffered from mediocre animation, a clichéd story and a host of forgettable characters. Slop Reilly of Ain't It Cool News gave it a 1 out of 5 stars, citing a poor screenplay, weak character development and unnatural character design and animation. Tasha Robinson of the Sci Fi Channel's Sci Fi Weekly gave it a B, while Jeffrey Kauffman of DVDTalk recommended it.

== Sequel ==
On February 27, 2007, at the New York Comic Con, Shadow Chronicles director Tommy Yune said, "Robotech: The Shadow Chronicles has been doing good business at retail, and we are currently in production on the sequel." Later that same day, Yune mentioned that the sequel would be a feature movie. The title of the sequel was revealed as Robotech: Shadow Rising, and the film was expected to be released within two years of the time of the announcement, earliest. While the two-year date was stated by Yune to be possible, it was never intended to be an actual release date.

Subsequent announcements in mid-2008 made it clear that little-or-no progress had been made on the film, which was indefinitely postponed, pending developments with the live-action film. At Anime Expo 2009, Kevin McKeever and Yune confirmed that Robotech: Shadow Rising had been put off indefinitely since Warner Bros. Pictures was actively developing a big-budget Robotech live-action feature film. Harmony Gold USA's 2009 San Diego Comic-Con panel revealed that production had not moved forward since the summer of 2007.

At a 2012 San Diego Comic-Con panel, Tommy Yune announced that Love Live Alive would pave the way for Shadow Rising and one year later announced at Anime Expo that they had resumed work on Shadow Rising.

Harmony Gold USA filed a trademark for the film's title in 2007 and extended it in 2010, however this trademark was abandoned in 2011. In July 2007, Harmony Gold submitted a copyright for a 97-page document Robotech: Shadow Rising with the subtitle The Shadow Chronicles - Part II and again filed a claim for a text with the title Robotech: Shadow Rising in August 2013. Among the authors listed on the 2013 copyright claim were F.A. King (aka Fabio Piccioni) and Ryan Gray, both of whom had previously written live action films produced by Harmony Gold.

In July 2017, Kevin McKeever of Harmony Gold mentioned on the Robotech.com forums that Shadow Rising, along with the planned spin-off Robotech: Academy, had not been cancelled. McKeever elaborated that the two projects would need involvement from Sony Pictures in order to move forward, due to them having taken over the development of the live-action film from Warner Bros.
