= Carl Macek =

American screenwriter

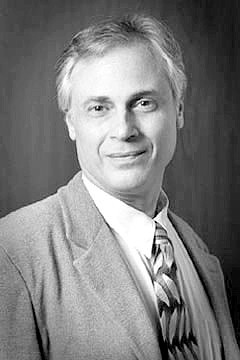
- Born: Carl Frank Macek; September 21, 1951; Pittsburgh, Pennsylvania, U.S.
- Died: April 17, 2010 (aged 58); Topanga, California, U.S.
- Education: California State University, Fullerton
- Occupations: Screenwriter; Producer; Voice actor
- Years active: 1979–2006
- Notable work: Robotech; Captain Harlock and the Queen of a Thousand Years; Lensman: Secret of the Lens
- Spouse: Svea Macek (m. 1981)
- Website: carlmacek.com

Carl Frank Macek (September 21, 1951 – April 17, 2010) was an American screenwriter and producer. Noted for his work on English-language adaptations of anime during the 1980s and 1990s, he was the creator of the Robotech franchise and the co-founder of Streamline Pictures. His work is considered to have been instrumental in creating mainstream awareness of Japanese animation in the United States.

== Career ==
=== Robotech and Harmony Gold USA ===
Macek came to public attention in 1985 as the producer and story editor of the influential animated television series Robotech, which he produced for Harmony Gold USA. Robotech is considered one of the titles most responsible for igniting anime fandom in North America and internationally. Macek intended to produce a sequel to Robotech, Robotech II: The Sentinels, but this project was canceled. While at Harmony Gold, Macek also produced the little-known, rarely-seen Captain Harlock and the Queen of a Thousand Years (which combines the almost-unrelated stories of Space Pirate Captain Harlock and Queen Millennia).

=== Streamline Pictures ===
Macek went on to co-found (with Jerry Beck) Streamline Pictures in 1988. Joining him were writers who had worked with him on Robotech, most notably, Steve Kramer, Tom Wyner, Gregory Snegoff, and Ardwight Chamberlain, each of whom are also experienced voice actors. Streamline Pictures was one of the first American companies to successfully deal in the regular production of imported Japanese animation. Among the titles released by Streamline are Lensman, Robot Carnival, Doomed Megalopolis, Twilight of the Cockroaches, Crying Freeman, Wicked City, the Fist of the North Star film, Akira, Lupin the 3rd: The Mystery of Mamo as well as the original English dub versions of Hayao Miyazaki's Lupin III: Castle of Cagliostro, Laputa: Castle in the Sky, My Neighbor Totoro, and Kiki's Delivery Service. As of 1993, Streamline Pictures distributed their anime through Orion Home Video and was eventually purchased by Orion in 1996.

=== Later career and other works ===
Before his death, Macek was working as a scriptwriter for the English dub of Naruto and Bleach for Viz Media, and consulting for Harmony Gold on Robotech: The Shadow Chronicles.

Macek was a co-editor of Film Noir – An Encyclopedic Reference to the American Style (1979) and a contributor to McGill's Survey of the Cinema. He authored The Art of Heavy Metal: Animation for the Eighties and Robotech Art 3: The Sentinels in which he chronicles in detail the conception and what went wrong during the production of the latter aborted animated series. He also worked as a scriptwriter for the animated series C.O.P.S., was the executive consultant for the animated film Heavy Metal 2000, and wrote the animated adaptation of Brian Pulido's Lady Death.

Macek adapted the treatment by Merian C. Cooper (the producer of King Kong) for the unproduced film project War Eagles into a novel and screenplay in 2008. The book was published in the summer of 2008 by Angelgate Press.

== Legacy in anime ==
Macek became one of the most controversial figures amongst English anime fandom. Streamline Pictures-dubbed anime were among the first to be available on home video as well as broadcast on cable. Over the years, he has seen his share of detractors and proponents, for while he did help to bring Japanese animation titles and series to the United States, his edits, re-rewrites and mash-ups (particularly The Robotech Saga) angered many fans of the original titles and series. To this day, anime fans still remain divided between appreciation and scorn for his work.

== Death ==
Jerry Beck, one of Macek's former business partners, revealed that Macek died of a heart attack on Saturday, April 17, 2010. Barely three months before his sudden death, Macek recorded a lengthy two-and-a-half-hour podcast interview with Anime News Network, offering an extensive retrospective on his entire career.

His obituary in the Los Angeles Times reported the place of death as Topanga Canyon. The obituary shows a picture of him surrounded by several Robotech characters from all three series.

After Macek's death, a short documentary, Carl Macek's Robotech Universe, was produced.

== Writer ==
- series head writer denoted in bold

=== Anime television series dubs ===
- **Robotech** (1985)
- **Captain Harlock and the Queen of a Thousand Years** (1985)
- Zillion (1990): eps 1-5
- Lupin the Third Part II (1993)
- Divergence Eve (2003)

=== Original television scripts ===
- COPS (1988-1989)

=== Anime film dubs ===
- Robotech: The Movie (1986)

=== OVA dubs ===
- Zillion: Burning Night (1988)
- Casshan: Robot Hunter (1995)

=== Live action dubs ===
- 2009: Lost Memories (2000)
- Yesterday (2002)

=== Original film scripts ===
- Robotech II: The Sentinels (1988)
- Computer Warriors: The Adventure Begins (1990)
- Heavy Metal 2000 (2000)
- Lady Death: The Motion Picture (2004)
- Robotech 3000 (2007)
- Robotech: Love Live Alive (2013)

== Producer ==
=== Television ===
- Captain Harlock and the Queen of a Thousand Years (1985)
- Robotech (1985)
- Zillion (1990): eps 1-5
- Lupin the Third Part II (1993)
- A.D. Police: To Protect and Serve (2001)
- Divergence Eve (2003)

=== Anime films ===
- The Brave Frog (1985)
- The Brave Frog's Great Adventure (1985)
- Codename: Robotech (1985)
- Robotech: The Movie (1986)
- Lily C.A.T (1987 film)
- Akira (1989)
- Lensman (1990)
- Fist of the North Star (1991)
- Robot Carnival (1991)
- The Castle of Cagliostro (1992)
- Golgo 13: The Professional (1992)
- Neo Tokyo (1992)
- Twilight of the Cockroaches (1992)
- Vampire Hunter D (1993)
- Wicked City (1993)
- Lupin the 3rd: The Mystery of Mamo (1995)
- My Beautiful Girl, Mari (2002)

=== OVAs ===
- Zillion: Burning Night (1990)
- Silent Möbius (1992)
- 8 Man After (1994)
- Crying Freeman (1994-1995): eps 1-5
- Doomed Megalopolis (1995)
- Casshan: Robot Hunter (1995)

=== Live action films ===
- Cyber Ninja (1988)
- Zeiram (1994)
- 2009: Lost Memories (2000)
- Yesterday (2002)

=== Original films ===
- Computer Warriors: The Adventure Begins (1990)
- Robotech: Love Live Alive (2013)
