= The Legend of the Titanic =

1999 animated film

- DVD cover art
- Directed by: Orlando Corradi; Kim J. Ok
- Written by: Celelia Castaldo; Loris Peota
- Produced by: Orlando Corradi
- Edited by: Emanuelle Fogelietti
- Music by: John Sposito (Gianni Sposito)
- Production companies: SEK Studio; ITB Spain; Hollywood Gang Productions USA; Mondo TV
- Distributed by: Mondo TV
- Release date: 17 April 1999 (Italy)
- Running time: 84 minutes
- Countries: North Korea; South Korea; Spain; Italy; United States

The Legend of the Titanic (Spanish: La leyenda del Titanic, Italian: La leggenda del Titanic) is a 1999 internationally co-produced animated fantasy film directed by Orlando Corradi and Kim J. Ok. The film is based on the sinking of the RMS Titanic, incorporating fantasy elements such as anthropomorphic animals and magical spells. In an attempt to advertise the story as more lighthearted, the film's writers decided to change the historical account so that no character (including the captain, crew, and passengers) would die, a decision that was met with controversy.

The Legend of the Titanic was followed by a 2004 sequel titled Tentacolino and a 2011 television series, Fantasy Island (not to be confused with the popular 1977–1984 fantasy drama of the same name).

== Plot ==
In New York City, an old mouse named Connors tells his grandchildren the supposedly "true" story of the RMS Titanic, after discouraging one of his grandchildren from playing with a shark whistle, telling him it will attract Mr. Ice.

In April 1912, Connors was a young sailor mouse on the Titanic's maiden voyage from Southampton to New York. He also befriends a young Brazilian mouse named Ronny, who enjoys playing soccer, and falls in love with his sister Stella. Meanwhile, a rich aristocratic woman named Elizabeth, her family, and a young Romani-Spanish man named Don Juan board the Titanic, which immediately sets off.

Connors and Ronny learn that Elizabeth's family is insisting that she be married to a whaling mogul named Everard Maltravers, despite her adamantly refusing. When Elizabeth goes to the bow of the ship that night, some dolphins begin communicating with her, explaining its possibility through magic moonbeams catching her tears as they fell into the water. They inform her that Maltravers only wishes to marry her to get permission from her father to have global access to the oceans for his whaling operations.

Connors and Ronny introduce themselves to Elizabeth and offer to help her. Listening to their advice, Elizabeth tells her father she doesn't want to marry Maltravers, to which he accepts, despite having insisted she marry Maltravers earlier. Meanwhile, Don Juan's Rough Collie dog Smiley meets Connors and Ronny, who help to arrange a meeting and dance for Elizabeth and Juan, who fall in love.

Having failed to achieve their wedding plan, Elizabeth's stepmother and Maltravers decide to resort to drastic measures. They decide to hold Elizabeth's father up at gunpoint, force him to sign the whaling concession, and tie him up. At the same time, Mr. Ice, a tiger shark who escaped from prison is asked to arrange the destruction of the ship. Mr. Ice and his gang of sharks prepares to sink the Titanic. Maltravers' manservant Geoffreys asks the radio man to send an urgent wire from Maltravers to his whaling ships by telegraph, but the mice chew apart the wires to stop it from being sent.

Ice and his gang fool a giant innocent-minded octopus named Tentacles into heaving an iceberg to the surface of the ocean. The Titanic crashes into the iceberg, during which Maltravers and his entourage flee the ship in a lifeboat. In order to fix the telegraph wires, the mice enlist the help of a French mouse named Camembert, who insist they tie the wires to his moustache, seemingly electrocuting him to death.

Elizabeth and Juan manage to save her father and escort him to a lifeboat. Suddenly, several whales and dolphins arrive to help with the rescue, while a guilt-ridden but determined Tentacles tries to hold the bow and the stern together as they are splitting apart, and keep the ship on the surface for as long as possible. Everyone jumps off the Titanic into the sea and are saved by a whale. Once everyone on the ship has been saved, the Titanic finally sinks, taking Tentacles with it and seemingly crushing him. In the morning, the passengers are taken aboard the RMS Carpathia. The said ship arrives in New York and disembarks the passengers. Elizabeth and Juan are married, as are Connors and Stella. Everyone celebrates at the Brooklyn Bridge, where Tentacles and Camembert show up, inexplicably unharmed.

Back in modern-day New York old Connors tells his grandchildren that whales are still hunted, and that they must do whatever they can to stop the whaling scheme at all costs.

== Cast ==
=== Original version ===
- Emanuela Rossi – Elizabeth
- Vittorio Guerrieri – Don Juan
- Stefano Crescentini – Top Connors
- Maria Teresa Cella – Ronnie
- Luca Ward – Maltravers
- Ferruccio Amendola – Denti di Ghiaccio
- Oliviero Dinelli – Tentacolino

=== English dub ===
- Gregory Snegoff – Maltravers
- Francis Pardeilhan – Don Juan
- Jane Alexander – Elizabeth Camden
- Anna Mazzotti – Ronnie
- Sean Patrick Lovett – Top Connors
- Teresa Pascarelli – Rachel

== Production ==
The Legend of the Titanic was an international effort between North Korea's state-owned SEK for animation, and Spanish ITB and American Hollywood Gang as producers, as well as an Italian writing team and composer.

== Reception ==
Tim Brayton of Alternate Ending gave the movie a 0.5/5, stating "A giddy, so-bad-it's-the-most-essential-movie-I've-ever-seen disaster of tasteless incompetence."

== See also ==
- Titanic: The Legend Goes On, another animated film about the Titanic
- List of films about the Titanic
