= Titanic: The Legend Goes On =

2000 Italian animated film by Camillo Teti

- Theatrical release poster
- Directed by: Camillo Teti
- Written by: Camillo Teti; Jymn Magon (consulting)
- Produced by: Camillo Teti; Gian Paolo Brugnoli; Marco Scaffardi
- Starring: Lisa Russo; Mark Thompson-Ashworth; Gisella Matthews; Kenneth Belton; Gregory Snegoff
- Edited by: Giovanni Conti
- Music by: Detto Mariano
- Production company: Titanic Cartoons SRL Roma
- Distributed by: Medusa Film
- Release date: 15 September 2000 (Italy)
- Running time: 82 minutes (uncut); 70 minutes
- Country: Italy
- Languages: Italian; English
- Budget: $6 million

Titanic: The Legend Goes On (Italian: Titanic, mille e una storia or Titanic: La leggenda continua), also released as Titanic: The Animated Movie, is a 2000 Italian animated musical film. It was produced by Titantic Cartoons SRL Roma and distributed by Medusa Film. It was written and directed by Camillo Teti. The film serves as a loose historical retelling of the 1912 sinking of the Titanic.

Following three years of production, the film had a theatrical release on September 15, 2000, in Italy, and was also released straight-to-video in Canada in July 2001. In addition to the uncut dub, another English version featuring an altered plot and different editing and soundtrack was released. Since release, Titanic: The Legend Goes On has been panned by critics who criticized its animation, writing, voice-acting and use of cultural stereotypes, with several drawing negative comparisons to animated films released during the Disney Renaissance. In retrospect, many critics have cited it as one of the worst films of all time, and among the worst animated films ever made.

== Plot ==
A White Star Line–chartered boat train is carrying passengers to the RMS Titanic. A poor girl named Angelica is treated as a servant by her wicked stepmother and two stepsisters. She dreams of finding both love and her missing mother, with only a blue locket as a clue to her mother's identity.

At the same time, an upper-class English man named William boards with his maid, who laments the loss of her daughter years ago, and his secretary, Gaston. Other passengers include the gold-digging Winnie, a failing banker named Jeremy McFlannel, a jewel thief named Corynthia Meanstreak, her two henchmen Kirk and Dirk, a detective named Sam Bradbury, who is pursuing them, and Molly, a gorgeous singer. Also boarding in the cargo hold are a group of animals, including a family of Yiddish mice, some geese, a dog named Fritz, a magpie named Hector, and a band of Mexican mice. Throughout the voyage, the various passengers meet and interact. William and Angelica fall in love at first sight, while Winnie and Jeremy fall for each other after Winnie's dog Flopsy trips him. Gaston, meanwhile, attempts to woo Molly with Angelica's locket, which he found after she unknowingly dropped it. Sam goes undercover to find Corynthia, while Kirk and Dirk make several unsuccessful attempts to steal jewelry from Winnie.

At a reception, Angelica is able to attend with William after her cabinmate Victoria loans her a suitable dress. Meanwhile, the Yiddish mouse child Maxie discovers that Angelica is missing her locket and recruits the other animals to help search for it, finding it in time for her to wear it to the reception. Upon seeing the locket being worn by Angelica, and hearing the correct implication from one of the ship's officers that it was stolen when she received it, Molly slaps Gaston and dumps him. When Gertrude, Bernice and Hortense (the stepmother and stepsisters, respectively) attempt to break up Angelica and William, Maxie scares them off. Kirk and Dirk manage to successfully steal a pearl choker from Winnie, but learn that it is fake, as Winnie is not rich and uses fake jewelry to infatuate wealthy men.

The Titanic hits the iceberg and begins to sink as the passengers rush for the lifeboats. Angelica, Victoria, and Victoria's grandchildren reunite with William and they head with the steerage passengers to the boat deck. All of the animals escape on floating crates, rescuing the ship's cook in the process, and are led to safety by dolphins. Winnie chooses to stay behind with Jeremy, who reveals to her that he is not the rich man she thought he was – he was on his way to America to be bailed out after his bank failed. Despite learning this, Winnie still loves him and they remain on the ship. Molly also chooses to stay on the ship, singing with the band. William grabs a small child to protect as he falls overboard, while the ship breaks in half and sinks beneath the ocean. He puts the child safely in a nearby boat, but his foot is trapped in a rope from the ship's stern. On one of the lifeboats, Angelica discovers that William's maid is actually her mother and the two are reunited. They come across Sam in the water and pull him aboard. William surfaces alongside the boat and is reunited with Angelica. An epilogue reveals that the two were married and lived happily ever after, Detective Sam Bradbury put Corynthia behind bars, Kirk and Dirk married Angelica's stepsisters, and Gaston married a wealthy socialite, hoping to live off her money but ending up in charge of her home's household chores.

== Voice cast ==
Italian version

- Francesca Guadagno – Angelica
- Francesco Pezzulli – William
- Valeria Perilli – Gertrude
- Claudia Pittelli – Berenice
- Eliana Lupo – Ortensia
- Stefania Romagnoli – Amalia
- Lucio Saccone – Gaston
- Luigi Ferraro – Kirk
- Diego Reggente – Dirk
- Mino Caprio – Sam
- Stefano Mondini – First Officer Stockard
- Pieraldo Ferrante – Capitano
- Antonella Giannini – Molly
- Letizia Ciampa – Pablito
- Graziella Polesinanti – Victoria
- Bobby Solo – Fritz

English version

- Lisa Russo – Angelica
- Mark Thompson-Ashworth – William
- Caroline Yung – Maxie the Mouse / Swedish Mouse
- Gregory Snegoff – Fritz / Geoffrey
- Giselle Matthews – Gertrude
- Silva Benton – Bernice
- Bianca Alessandra Ara – Hortense
- Veronica Wells – Corynthia
- Clive Riche – Kirk
- Doug Meakin – Dirk
- Jacques Stany – Gaston
- Mickey Knox – Sam
- Edmund Purdom – Jeremy McFlannel
- David Brandon – First Officer Stockard
- Kenneth Belton – Captain Smith
- Pat Starke – Molly
- Jill Tyler – Victoria
- Susan Spifford – Angelica's Mother (uncredited)

== Production ==
Titanic: The Legend Goes On was in production for three years. Director Camillo Teti hired a team of 550 artists from his Cooperativa Girasole filmmaking school and another institute from Florence. The project was kept secret for over a year due to Teti's concern over an American film studio stealing the idea.

It was reported that Teti had hired Sharon Stone to provide the voice of Amalia/Corynthia, and that Leonardo DiCaprio had expressed interest in voicing William.

== Release ==
It was released to theaters on 15 September 2000 in Italy, and received a DVD premiere in Canada the following July. The Canadian VHS by Equinox Entertainment (titled Titanic: The Animated Movie) and DVD has since gone out of print, though it has been re-released by Third Millennium Distributions.

=== English versions ===
There are two English versions done with the same cast: an uncut dub, and a drastically cut and re-edited dub. The latter one features an altered plot, with entire scenes edited in a different sequence, removed, re-used, or placed before other scenes, as well as different music score and songs by Matt McGuire. While the uncut version is 82 minutes long, this version was shortened to 58 minutes, plus 12 minutes of credits showing some deleted scenes, bringing the runtime to 70 minutes.

== Reception ==
The film was described by Linda Maria Koldau, author of The Titanic on Film: Myth versus Truth, as being "a failed Disney imitation that excels in bad taste". Christopher Campbell of IndieWire wrote that the film was "inappropriate for children" and that "it's so terribly written and drawn that it's offensive to the Titanic's memory." Film critic Tim Brayton of Alternate Ending said it was "among the most nuttily enjoyable bad movies of the 2000s".

Titanic: The Legend Goes On has appeared on several "worst-ever" lists. British film magazine Total Film named it as the worst film ever made, after it topped a list of the 66 worst films ever in 2012. Total Film also included it on a list of the "50 Worst Kids Movies", noting that it is "Widely considered one of the worst animated movies ever made." Likewise, Spanish film magazine Fotogramas selected it as one of the 20 worst films ever made. Collider also described it as one of the worst films ever made, but notes that it "[lacks] the cult following that other bad films often acquire." While noting its inclusion on list of the worst films, Rachael Johnson of MovieWeb listed it as the worst film about the Titanic. Will Roberts of American-based Showbiz Cheat Sheet listed it as the worst animated film ever made, while Screen Rant included it on a list of the twelve worst animated films of all time. It became the lowest-rated film on IMDb's Bottom 100 list in 2012.

== See also ==
- The Legend of the Titanic, another animated film about the Titanic
- Mockbuster
- List of films about the RMS Titanic
- List of films considered the worst (21st century)
