= Birth (1984 film) =

1984 anime original video animation

バース (Bāsu)
- Original video animation
- Directed by: Shinya Sadamitsu
- Produced by: Toshihiro Nagao
- Music by: Joe Hisaishi
- Studio: Idol; Kaname Production
- Licensed by: NA: Streamline Pictures (expired); ADV Films (expired); UK: ADV Films (expired)
- Released: August 21, 1984
- Runtime: 80 minutes

Birth (バース, Bāsu), also known in the West as Planet Busters or The World of the Talisman, is a 1984 anime original video animation (OVA), which was released on VHS and DVD in North America by, variously, Streamline and ADV Films. The Japanese DVD was released by video game publisher Atlus on March 25, 2005.

It is based on the manga Birth Planet Busters by Yoshinori Kanada published in 1983.

The story is set on a far futuristic planet where four mercenaries band together to try to unlock the power of the ultimate weapon which can either save humanity or destroy it. Against mechas and strange races, they sweep the vast planet to reach their goal.

== Plot summary ==
Aqualoid was a prosperous planet, but an attack from a mysterious life force, the Inorganics, transforms it into a post-apocalyptic shell of its former self. When Nam finds a mysterious sword, he is suddenly the object of a planet-wide chase. With the Inorganics closing in, Nam and his friends band together to discover the secret of the sword and save their world.

== Characters ==
In order of appearance - Japanese (1984) / Streamline (1987, 1992) / ADV (2004):

- Monga - Fuyumi Shiraishi / __ / Matt Hislope
- Mu-nyo - Chika Sakamoto / __ / Cyndi Williams
- Rasa - Miina Tominaga / Alexandra Kenworthy / Alexis Chamov
- Kim/Keen - Kaneto Shiozawa / Kerrigan Mahan / Bradley Carlin
- Bao/Mo/Pao - Ichirō Nagai / Gregory Snegoff / James Phillips
- Nam's Ostrich - / __ / Cyndi Williams
- Nam/Talon - Kazuki Yao / Tony Oliver / Brent Werzner
- Arlia - Keiko Toda / __ / Gemma Wilcox
- Orange Mole - / __ / Robert S. Fisher
- Inorganic Biker #1 - Ryūsuke Ōbayashi / Bill Capizzi / Robert Matney
- Inorganic Biker #2 - Yusaku Yara / __ / Matt Hislope
- Inorganic Biker #3 - Kōzō Shioya / __ / Robert S. Fisher
- Village Girl/Child - Noriko Tsukase / Rebecca Forstadt / Samantha Inoue-Harte
- Grandma/Mother - Reiko Suzuki / Lisa Michaels / Mary Agen Cox
- Grandpa/Father - Jōji Yanami / __ / Garry Peters
- Inorganic Biker Kid/Kooni - Masahiro Anzai / __ / Jeffrey Mills
- Monster Octopus - Miki Takahashi / __ / Robert S. Fisher
- Giant Inorganic - Akari Hibino / __ / Vinnie Moxpar
- Monga's Tribe - Bigjyl, Jim Damm, Robert S. Fisher, Samantha Inoue-Harte, Wil Ragan, Jessica Simon, Ben Turrabiarte, Racel Vasquez, Dominic Vitucci, Kenny Weigel

== Production ==
Yoshinori Kanada acted as the OVA's character designer, as well as one of the animation directors and key animators. Another animator on Birth was a young Hideaki Anno, who would go on to direct Neon Genesis Evangelion. Fellow Gainax founder Yoshiyuki Sadamoto worked uncredited as an animator.

== English dubs ==
Two English dubs of Birth exist. The first was licensed in 1987 by Harmony Gold and released by Streamline Pictures in North America and the United Kingdom under the title The World of the Talisman. According to New Straits Times, it briefly aired in Malaysia in late 1987. The OVA was later retitled again to Planet Busters. Harmony Gold's version changes some of the character names, tones down some of the more surreal Japanese humour to appeal to a younger audience, and contains more American-style dialogue, alternate music composed by Randy Miller and additional voice-overs. The second dub by ADV Films, released on DVD on July 13, 2004, is much more faithful to the original Japanese version.

== Reception ==
The Encyclopedia of Science Fiction described Birth as combining mysticism, metaphysics, action and comedy, although it considered these elements frequently at odds with one another. It praised the generally high quality of the animation and some of its imagery, as well as the film's pacing, while regarding it as flawed but reasonably entertaining. The encyclopedia also interpreted the Inorganic motorcyclists' self-absorption and insecurities as a possible metaphor for undesirable human traits that must be overcome, and found the proposed destruction of the apparently sentient Inorganics morally troubling, particularly because it amounts to genocide.
