= Tentacolino =

2004 animated film

- DVD cover
- Directed by: Kim Jun-ok
- Written by: Clelia Castaldo; Orlando Corradi; Loris Peota
- Produced by: Orlando Corradi
- Starring: Jane Alexander; Anna Mazzotti; Francis Pardeilhan; Gregory Snegoff
- Edited by: David Pollini
- Music by: Gianni Sposito
- Production companies: SEK Studio; Mondo TV
- Distributed by: Mondo Cinema
- Release date: 17 June 2004
- Running time: 88 minutes
- Countries: Italy; North Korea

Tentacolino, also known as In Search of the Titanic, is a 2004 Italian-North Korean animated fantasy film directed by Kim Jun-ok. It is a sequel to the 1999 animated film The Legend of the Titanic.

== Plot ==
In 1915, Don Juan, Elizabeth, their Rough Collie Smile, and their pet mice Top Connors and Ronnie, are tasked by the U.S. Navy to explore the ocean depths in search for the wreck of the Titanic. A gang of tiger sharks led by Mr. Ice orders them to cut the cable of the bathysphere that the humans and their pets are on and sink it, because he dislikes the craft's yellow color. After the shark attack, the craft falls and wedges between some rocks, leaving the occupants unconscious. A giant octopus named Tentacolino finds the craft and tries to pull it out, recognizing the occupants on board. Suddenly, a host of merpeople arrive to fill in for him, explaining that the surface is too far and the occupants will perish due to a loss of oxygen from the impact. They enter the craft and use spraycans to install bubbles on their heads so they do not drown. As the merpeople travel back to their base, the group awaken and find themselves in Atlantis, where the merpeople live. Smile the dog is at first terrified by this, thinking he is in "doggy hell", but calms down shortly after.

The expeditioners undergo a procedure of drinking an elixir which enables them to breathe underwater before entering the city. Pingo, a living toy silver-fish who is one of the ambassadors for Atlantis' monarchy, reveals to them through a musical number in a room full of living toys, that they cannot go back to the surface, shocking the group. Later on in the main square, Smile falls in love with another female dog, eventually delighting her with a rose planted on her hair. Meanwhile, the pet mice Ronnie and Top Connors are approached by a couple of rats and attend a secret meeting of a larger group of mice and rats, where they learn about a conspiracy to steal Atlantis' elixir of life so as to gain immortality and strive for world domination. The group is led by a pompous but naive propagandist rat and is in cahoots with the sharks and their leader Iceteeth from earlier. Ronnie and Top Connors alert the others about the plot. The king of Atlantis decides to have the two mice spy for him on the rats' plan, and substitute the elixir flask with a flask of ordinary water so as to sabotage the plan.

The sharks send a telegram to a boat on the surface, where a couple men are on their own expedition to find a perceived treasure in the Titanic. They are told to be on guard and support the sharks and rats on their mission. During a battle between the merpeople and sharks, a young toy soldier is promoted to be the new general of a 19th-century-style artillery group after being at first mistaken for a little girl on account of a wig he wore. The merpeople use an amnesia laser to zap the ship on the surface, making the men forget what they were doing, so as to repel them. Meanwhile, the rats and mice steal the fake elixir and present it to their rat leader and a mouse elder, who is used as a guinea pig to see how the elixir works. After consuming one drip of the flask, the elder is tied to a couple of bricks and dropped into a deep well of water which almost drowns him, as a few of the mice jump in to save him, realizing that the elixir was illegitimate. Infuriated, the elder demands the rat leader and his fellow conspirators be committed to a mental hospital in the sewers and be kept there forever, despite his desperate pleas.

As a reward for their help defending Atlantis from the sharks and rats, the king assists the expeditioners in the Titanic's recovery, enlisting the assistance of Tentacolino and Pingo. The king then transports the Titanic and the expeditioners to the bay of a secret island, where Don Juan and Elizabeth will live happily ever after, while being able to return to Atlantis whenever they wish.

== Cast ==
=== Original Italian cast ===
- Rodolfo Bianchi – King
- Fabio Boccanera – Don Juan
- Paolo Buglioni – Ice
- Stefano Crescentini – Top Connors
- Oliviero Dinelli – Tentacolino
- Luigi Ferraro – Mouse Pirate
- Christian Iansante – Baron von Tilt
- Beatrice Margiotti – Queen of Atlantis / Sea Amazon #2
- Stefano Mondini – Smile
- Fabrizio Vidale – Cutter

=== English dub cast ===
- Jane Alexander – Elizabeth
- Anna Mazzotti – Ronnie
- Francis Pardeilhan – Don Juan
- Gregory Snegoff – Smile

== Television series ==
It also got an animated series named Fantasy Island.

== Reception ==
Tim Brayton of Alternate Ending gave the movie a 0.5/5, stating "Among the very top tier of so-bad-they're-good movies of the last 25 years."
