= You've Got This =

2020 Mexican film

- Film poster
- Spanish: Ahí te Encargo
- Directed by: Salvador Espinosa
- Written by: Tiaré Scanda; Leonardo Zimbrón
- Starring: Mauricio Ochmann; Esmeralda Pimentel
- Distributed by: Netflix
- Release date: October 2, 2020
- Running time: 111 minutes
- Country: Mexico
- Language: Spanish

You've Got This (Spanish: Ahí te Encargo) is a 2020 Mexican film directed by Salvador Espinosa, written by Tiaré Scanda and Leonardo Zimbrón and starring Tato Alexander, Moisés Arizmendi and Fernando Becerril.

== Plot ==
This is the story of Alejandro (Alex) and Cecilia (Ceci), a married couple living in Mexico. Ceci is a driven career woman, focused on work and completely disinterested in having kids. Alejandro wants children badly, and one day asks Ceci to agree to have a child as soon as possible, but she's not having it. She's been offered a partnership in the firm she works at, which is a highly unusual promotion for a woman and is very excited about it.

Later that day, as Alejandro is walking down the street, he meets up with a waitress he promised to help if she needs it. She asks him to take her baby, Alan, for 3 days while she takes care of something important. A hesitant Alejandro agrees, and takes Alan. He brings him home, trying to avoid having Ceci see Alan, but his plan fails and she does not react well. She gets quite angry and insists that he get the baby back to its mother as soon as possible.

The day Alan's mother is supposed to return comes and goes, so Alex sets out to find her. After a few more days, a friend alerts him that the mother has returned. He brings the baby back to her, and finds out she was being treated for brain cancer in the time she was away. She asks him to adopt the baby, but he refuses. As he begins to leave, she faints and, feeling bad for her, Alejandro brings her and the baby home. Ceci arrives at home just in time to hear him tell Alan's mother that she can stay with them.

They have a blowout and Alejandro breaks down, essentially admitting that the only reason he married Ceci is so she could have a baby with him. She goes to a friend's house and they discuss Alejandro's insistence on being a father. He calls, and her friends convince her not to answer the call.

Over the next few days, he continues to try to call her over and over to no avail. Finally, she decides to call him and they connect very briefly, with Ceci asking him not to be home when she comes to get her things.

Alejandro makes plans to adopt the baby and move in with his mother. He heads to work with Alan, which is against office policy. He is caught by his boss with the kid and immediately gets fired. The next morning, he goes into the office to apologize to his manager and has a conversation with her about how terrible she's been, making suggestions as to how she can improve how the workers regard her. She rejects his suggestions, but says she'll consider rehiring him.

Ultimately, he ends up meeting up with Ceci at a major meeting she's attending for her promotion and they reconcile. As the meeting commences, Alejandro gets a call that Alan's mother has been admitted to the hospital. Cecilia asks the CEO if she can present up-front and go to the hospital to support her husband, but he tells her it's just a formality and she's already been given the partnership/promotion. All she needs to do is sign the papers. She signs, and they head to the hospital.

Alan's mother dies, and Ceci and Alejandro adopt Alan.

The film closes with Cecilia packing her things to leave for Hong Kong, Alan sleeping on the bed nearby, and Alejandro joking about going to Hong Kong with her. She gets upset, asking him not to joke because she'll miss him so much, and Alejandro pulls out plane tickets to Hong Kong, confirming that he and Alan will be joining her on her new venture.

== Cast ==
- Tato Alexander
- Moisés Arizmendi
- Fernando Becerril
- Verónica Bravo
- Mariana Cabrera
- Matteo Giannini
- Juan Martín Jauregui
- Verónica Langer
- Montserrat Marañon
- Mauricio Ochmann
- Esmeralda Pimentel
- Regina Reynoso
- Tiaré Scanda
