= Gregory Snegoff =

American actor

- Born: June 22, 1955 (age 71); Santa Monica, California, U.S.
- Occupations: Voice actor, writer, dialogue director
- Years active: 1973–present
- Spouse(s): Lisa Michelson (m. ?–1991; her death) Fiorella Capuano (m. 1995)
- Parent(s): Marc Snegoff; Alexandra Kenworthy

Gregory Snegoff (born June 22, 1955) is an American voice actor, writer and dialogue director who frequently works on English-language anime dubs. He is additionally known by the names Greg Snegoff, Gregory Snow and Greg Snow.

== Early life ==
Snegoff is a native of Santa Monica, California. He is the son of make-up artist Marc Snegoff and the voice actress Alexandra Kenworthy and brother of stuntman Tony Snegoff.

== Career ==
He is known for providing the voices of Khyron and Scott Bernard in Robotech, Professor Kusakabe and Additional voices in My Neighbor Totoro, Taki Renzaburo in Wicked City, Maltravers in The Legend of the Titanic, Fritz / Geoffrey in Titanic: The Legend Goes On, Smile in Tentacolino, and Fukuo and Additional voices in Kiki's Delivery Service, and the title character of Cocco Bill.

== Personal life ==
Snegoff was married to fellow voice actor Lisa Michelson until her death in 1991. Since 1995, Snegoff has been married to Fiorella Capuano.

== Filmography ==
=== Film ===
Year	Title	Role	Notes
1980	The Last Hunter	Drunken Soldier in Bar	Uncredited
1982	Monsignor	1st Soldier	
1983	The Black Stallion Returns	Steward	
1983	Golgo 13: The Professional	Golgo 13 / Snake / Radio DJ	English version; voice
1983	Yor, the Hunter from the Future	Yor	Voice
1983	Dagger Eyes	Police detective	
1984	She	Godan	
1984	Lensman	DJ Bill	English version; voice
1984	Birth	Mo	English version; voice
1984	Megazone 23	Mjr. B.D.	English version; voice
1984	The Return of Godzilla	Chief Cabinet Secretary Takegami / Kitagawa / newscaster	English version; voice
1985	Ladyhawke	Cart Driver	
1986	Fist of the North Star	Rei / Uygle	English version; voice
1986	Robotech: The Movie	Anchor / Col. B.D. Andrews / Additional Voices	English version; voice
1987	Wicked City	Taki	English version; voice
1987	White Phantom	Sanada	Voice
1987	Lily C.A.T.	Dick	English version; voice
1987	Twilight of the Cockroaches	Hans	English version; voice
1988	My Neighbor Totoro	Prof. Tatsuo Kusakabe / Totoro / Additional Voices	English version; voice
1988	Robotech II: The Sentinels	Emil Lang	Voice
1989	Kiki's Delivery Service	Various	English version; voice
1990	The Spirit of '76	Voice Talent	Voice
1990	Misery	Reporter #3	
1991	Point Break	Weatherman	Voice; uncredited
1992	Sangokushi	Yu / Advisor	English version; voice
1992	Cool World	Bash	Voice
1992	Glengarry Glen Ross	Additional Voice	
1999	The Legend of the Titanic	Everard Maltravers / Mr. Ice	English version; voice
2000	Titanic: The Legend Goes On	Fritz / Geoffrey	English version; voice
2004	Tentacolino	Smile	English version; voice
2006	Robotech: The Shadow Chronicles	Scott Bernard / Haydonite	Voice
2007	Winx Club: The Secret of the Lost Kingdom	Narrator / Mike	Voice
2013	Robotech: Love Live Alive	Scott Bernard	Voice
2020	You've Got This	Guillermo	English version; voice

=== Television ===
Year	Title	Role	Notes
1979	Lupin the Third Part II	Inspector Beauty	Episode: "Shooting Orders!!"
1981	Seagull Island	Tom Sherman	Episode #1.1
1983	Around the World with Willy Fog	Inspector Dix / Dix / Weston	26 episodes
1984	Noozles	Alex Brown (1988)	Episode: "A Wonderful Friendship"
1985	Christopher Columbus	Francisco Pinzon	4 episodes
1985	Codename: Robotech	Khyron / Lang	Television film; voice
1985	Cheers	Bellboy	Episode: "The Bartender's Tale"
1985	Robotech	Scott Bernard / Khyron / Evacuation Announcement	Voice
1986	Space Baby	Telephone voice	Pilot episode
1986	Macron 1	Eharn / Fritz / Evil Attraction	Voice; uncredited
1987	The Tracey Ullman Show	Tomas	Episode #1.8
1988–1990	Animated Stories from the New Testament	Caiaphas / John the Baptist	5 episodes
1989, 1991	The Animated Book of Mormon	Zoram / Servant	2 episodes
1991	Animated Hero Classics	Pinzón	Episode: "Christopher Columbus"
1993	Animated Stories from the Bible	Elijah	Episode: "Elijah"
1994	The Mr. Zed Show	Abomnable Snowman	Voice
1997	Pocahontas: Princess of the American Indians	Moc	26 episodes
1998–1999	Sandokan - The Tiger of Malaysia	Sandokan	26 episodes
2000–2004	Cocco Bill	Cocco Bill / Slowtrot	104 episodes
2001	Sandokan - The Tiger Roars Again	Sandokan	26 episodes
2003	Tracy e Polpetta	Stigg	Television miniseries
2003–2004	The Spaghetti Family	Poldo	26 episodes
2017	Les héritiers de Patmos	Father Fontanella	Episode: "L'art secret"

=== Video games ===
Year	Title	Role	Notes
2004	Robotech: Invasion	Locke / Xed / Scott	Voice
