= Streamline Pictures =

Defunct American media company

- Original logo (1989–1993)
- Type: Private company (1988–1997); Name-only unit (1997–2002)
- Industry: Anime dubbing Film and television distribution
- Founded: October/November 1988
- Founder: Carl Macek; Jerry Beck
- Defunct: March 31, 2002
- Fate: Disbanded
- Headquarters: Los Angeles, California, USA
- Products: TV series Theatrical films Original video animations

Streamline Pictures was an American media company. Founded by screenwriter Carl Macek and animation historian Jerry Beck, it was one of the earliest distributors of English-dubbed Japanese animation.

== History ==
=== Founding ===
Founded in Los Angeles, California, in late 1988, Streamline Pictures was one of the first North American companies that was created primarily with the intention of distributing translated anime uncut and faithful to the original content. The founders of Streamline were television writer and producer Carl Macek, who had worked for Harmony Gold USA on the series Robotech, and animation historian Jerry Beck. At one point or another, Gregory Snegoff, Steve Kramer, Ardwight Chamberlain, Tom Wyner, and Mike Reynolds, all of whom served as series staff writers (and voice actors) on Robotech, worked as independent writers and voice actors for Streamline.

=== High-profile releases ===
A credits sequence created by Streamline for their 1991 VHS tapes of Colonel Bleep

The first high-profile release by Streamline was the film Laputa: Castle in the Sky from director Hayao Miyazaki, premiering at the Roxy Screening Room in Philadelphia on March 24, 1989. The company was also known for its theatrical release of the film Akira at The Biograph in Georgetown, Washington, D.C. on December 25, 1989, as well as its 1992 video dubbing of The Castle of Cagliostro (earlier screened with subtitles at the Film Forum in New York City in April 1991). Streamline also dubbed My Neighbor Totoro, and Kiki's Delivery Service, both adapted and directed by Gregory Snegoff, in 1988 for Tokuma Shoten, although these were only used as in-flight films by Japan Airlines at the time. As a fan of Miyazaki's films, Macek did not think Laputa (of which Streamline was the distributor) had received the quality of dubbing that a Miyazaki film deserved. He thought that it could have been done better, so Tokuma Shoten gave him the opportunity to prove his words. For his first project, he asked to dub My Neighbor Totoro, one of his favorite Miyazaki works. The Streamline dub of My Neighbor Totoro was released theatrically in the U.S. by Troma Films in 1993, but its dub of Kiki's Delivery Service appeared only on the 1990s Japanese laserdisc release of that title. Since then, however, all three afore-mentioned films by Miyazaki at Studio Ghibli have been redubbed by Disney.

Tokuma Shoten was pleased with the quality of the initial work, and it immediately hired Streamline to produce the English language version of Kiki's Delivery Service. Soon after its release, the film was bought by Japan Airlines, who showed it during their flights between Japan and the U.S. Streamline also licensed and dubbed other popular anime series and films, such as Fist of the North Star, Wicked City, Lensman, Vampire Hunter D and Golgo 13: The Professional.

=== Home video market ===
Streamline, in being the first company dedicated to making anime accessible to the English-speaking world, was notable for releasing a wide variety of anime that fit in a wide variety of genres, many of which do not fit completely in any genre such as Twilight of the Cockroaches. During the 1990s VHS era, before the common availability of hybrid DVDs, anime distributors released anime via subtitled or dubbed tapes with the subtitled editions being noticeably more expensive than the dubs which were expected to sell better. Streamline is also notable in being the only such company to eschew this practice and release only dubs of its anime. The only exceptions were the later Akira subtitled release and their Robotech Collection, which included episodes of the original Macross, Southern Cross and Mospeada episodes on the same tape along with their Robotech counterparts. Since then, these three titles were re-released by ADV Films through Harmony Gold.

=== Criticism ===
Because of Macek's notoriety with a certain branch of fandom, Streamline became one of the early catalysts of the sub vs. dub debate. Macek's philosophy towards anime dubbing, as stated in several interviews, most notably published by Protoculture Addicts and Animag, has become largely synonymous with the negative connotation concerning "Americanized dubs".

=== Later years ===
Streamline Pictures stopped producing new anime releases in 1997, but continued to distribute its complete library in North America. In 1996, the company began to release foreign films under its "Independent Filmworks" label until 2000 when the company closed. The company's Modelworks division was sold in 1998 and the "Streamline Pictures Modelworks" division became a separate company operating under the name "Avatar Creations".

Today, rights to much of the Streamline film and television library (such as Akira and The Castle of Cagliostro) have either reverted to the Japanese rights holder and licensed to other companies, while others have never been re-released due to licensing issues and lack of demand.

== List of titles dubbed and/or released ==
| Year dubbed/released | Title | Previous/Last/Current licensee or status |
|---|---|---|
| 1989 | Laputa: Castle in the Sky | Tokuma Shoten; Walt Disney Pictures (as Castle in the Sky); GKIDS (as Castle in the Sky) |
| 1989 | Twilight of the Cockroaches | Discotek Media |
| 1989 | My Neighbor Totoro | Tokuma Shoten; 50th Street Films; Walt Disney Pictures; GKIDS |
| 1989 | Kiki's Delivery Service | Tokuma Shoten; Walt Disney Pictures; GKIDS |
| 1989 | Akira | Geneon Entertainment; Bandai Entertainment; Funimation |
| 1990 | Akira Production Report | Geneon Entertainment; out of print |
| 1990 | Lensman | Harmony Gold (as Lensman: Secret of the Lens); out of print |
| 1990 | Robot Carnival | Discotek Media |
| 1990 | Zillion | Funimation |
| 1991 | Spike and Mike's Festival of Animation | Mellow Manor Productions |
| 1991 | The Castle of Cagliostro | TMS Entertainment (as Lupin III: Cagliostro Castle); Manga Entertainment; Discotek Media/Eleven Arts |
| 1991 | Clutch Cargo | Cambria Productions; BCI Eclipse |
| 1991 | Colonel Bleep | Alpha Video; public domain |
| 1991 | Space Angel | Cambria Productions; BCI Eclipse |
| 1991 | Comic Book Confidential | Voyager Company; Home Vision Entertainment; Strand Releasing |
| 1991 | Fist of the North Star | Image Entertainment; Discotek Media (as Fist of the North Star: The Movie) |
| 1991 | Zillion Special: Burning Night | Funimation |
| 1991 | Mr. Happy | Playboy TV; out of print |
| 1992 | Planet Busters | ADV Films (as Birth); out of print |
| 1992 | Robotech II: The Sentinels | Palladium Books; ADV Films; A&E Networks Home Entertainment through Harmony Gold; Funimation |
| 1992 | Nadia | ADV Films (as Nadia: The Secret of Blue Water); Sentai Filmworks; GKIDS |
| 1992 | Windaria | Harmony Gold; ADV Films (as Once Upon a Time); out of print |
| 1992 | Vampire Hunter D | Urban Vision; Sentai Filmworks |
| 1992 | David Hand's Animaland | Image Entertainment; out of print |
| 1992 | Golgo 13: The Professional | Urban Vision; Discotek Media |
| 1992 | 3×3 Eyes | Geneon Entertainment; out of print |
| 1992 | Robotech | Family Home Entertainment; ADV Films; A&E Networks Home Entertainment through Harmony Gold; Funimation |
| 1992 | Super Dimension Fortress Macross | ADV Films; A&E Networks Home Entertainment through Harmony Gold; Funimation |
| 1992 | Super Dimension Cavalry Southern Cross | ADV Films; A&E Networks Home Entertainment through Harmony Gold; Funimation |
| 1992 | Genesis Climber MOSPEADA | ADV Films; A&E Networks Home Entertainment through Harmony Gold; Funimation |
| 1992 | Neo Tokyo | ADV Films; out of print |
| 1992 | Silent Möbius | Bandai Entertainment; out of print |
| 1993 | Dirty Pair: Affair of Nolandia | ADV Films; Nozomi Entertainment |
| 1993 | The Speed Racer Show | Trans-Lux/Speed Racer Enterprises; Family Home Entertainment (as Speed Racer: The Movie); out of print |
| 1993 | Doomed Megalopolis | ADV Films; Media Blasters |
| 1993 | Wicked City | Urban Vision; Discotek Media |
| 1993 | Lupin III: Tales of the Wolf (Lupin III's Greatest Capers) | Geneon Entertainment (as Lupin the 3rd); Discotek Media (as Lupin the Third Part II) |
| 1994 | Crying Freeman | ADV Films; Discotek Media |
| 1994 | Megazone 23, Part 1 | Image Entertainment; ADV Films; AnimEigo |
| 1994 | Megazone 23, Part 2 | ADV Films; AnimEigo |
| 1994 | Dirty Pair: Project Eden | ADV Films; Nozomi Entertainment |
| 1994 | Great Conquest: The Romance of Three Kingdoms | Discotek Media |
| 1994 | Dirty Pair: Flight 005 Conspiracy | ADV Films; Nozomi Entertainment |
| 1994 | 8 Man After | Image Entertainment; Discotek Media |
| 1994 | Lily C.A.T. | Discotek Media |
| 1994 | Cyber Ninja | Fox Lorber Home Video; out of print |
| 1994 | Zeram | Fox Lorber Home Video; Image Entertainment; Tokyo Shock (as Zeiram) |
| 1994 | 8 Man | Fox Lorber Home Video; out of print |
| 1995 | Crimson Wolf | Image Entertainment; out of print |
| 1995 | Lupin III: The Mystery of Mamo | Toho (as Lupin III); Image Entertainment; Geneon Entertainment (as Lupin the 3rd: The Movie - The Secret of Mamo); Discotek Media |
| 1995 | Casshan: Robot Hunter | ADV Films through Harmony Gold; Discotek Media |
| 1995 | Babel II | Image Entertainment; Discotek Media |
| 1995 | Barefoot Gen | Tara Releasing; Geneon Entertainment; Discotek Media |
| 1995 | Space Adventure Cobra | Tara Releasing; Urban Vision; Discotek Media |
