= Lensman (1984 film) =

1984 Japanese anime film by Yoshiaki Kawajiri

Lensman: Secret of the Lens
- Japanese theatrical poster
- Directed by: Yoshiaki Kawajiri; Kazuyuki Hirokawa
- Written by: Sōji Yoshikawa
- Based on: Galactic Patrol by E. E. Smith
- Produced by: Michihiro Tomii; Tadami Watanabe; Masao Maruyama
- Starring: Toshio Furukawa; Chikao Ohtsuka; Mami Koyama; Nachi Nozawa; Katsuya Kobayashi; Seizō Katō
- Narrated by: Eiji Kanie
- Cinematography: Iwao Yamaki
- Edited by: Osamu Tanaka
- Music by: Akira Inoue
- Production companies: Madhouse; MK Company
- Distributed by: Toho
- Release date: July 7, 1984
- Running time: 107 minutes
- Country: Japan
- Language: Japanese

Lensman: Secret of the Lens, known in Japan as Sci-Fi New Century Lensman (SF新世紀 レンズマン, Esuefu Shinseiki Renzuman), is a 1984 Japanese animated film based on the Lensman novels by E. E. Smith. Most of the CGI sequences were created by the Japan Computer Graphics Lab (JCGL). It was dubbed into English and released in the United States in 1990.

== Plot ==
The story is about a farm boy named Kimball "Kim" Kinnison. From a dying Lensman of the Galactic Patrol, Kinnison receives a particular Lens. It contains information that would enable the Galactic Patrol to face a weapon created by the Boskone Empire. A non-human species, the Arisians, created the Lenses in order to stand up to the evil Eddorians. Through their Lenses, Lensman minds are merged with the cosmic consciousness of Arisia. Opposing the Patrol is Lord Helmuth, a Boskone leader and drug lord, who would stop at nothing to get his hands on the Lens.

The Boskone blow up the agricultural planet Mqueie where Kim lives with his father, Gary ("Ken" in the Harmony Gold dub). Now a humble farmer, Gary is one of the founders of the Galactic Patrol. If he had not lost an arm in battle, Gary would have been a Lensman himself. Having always dreamt of becoming a Lensman, Gary sacrifices his own life to secure Kim's escape from the pursuing Boskone fleet.

Kim escapes the Boskone with his horned and bearded near-human friend Van Buskirk. Through the movie's events, Kim also meets Clarissa MacDougall, a nurse and technician working with the Galactic Patrol. Like Gary, she cannot explain how the Lens could be transferred from the dying man to Kim.

Through the tutelage of a flying alien green dragon hero named Worsel, Kim gradually realizes the Lens's power, which provides the key to Helmuth's defeat. He transmits the formula to the Galactic Patrol fleet, knowing that their planned attack against Helmuth would fail without the answer.

== Voice cast ==
Characters	Japanese voice actor	English dubbing actor (Harmony Gold, 1988)	English dubbing actor (Streamline Pictures, 1990)
Kimball Kinnison	Toshio Furukawa	Kerrigan Mahan	Kerrigan Mahan
Peter Van Buskirk	Chikao Ohtsuka	Michael McConnohie	Michael McConnohie
Clarissa MacDougall	Mami Koyama	Melanie MacQueen	Edie Mirman
Worsel	Nachi Nozawa	Jeff Winkless	Steve Kramer
DJ Bill	Katsuya Kobayashi	Gregory Snegoff	Gregory Snegoff
Lord Helmuth	Seizō Katō	Tom Wyner	Tom Wyner
Gary Kinnison	Tadashi Nakamura	Michael Forest; Tom Wyner	Mike Reynolds
Admiral Haines	Hidekatsu Shibata	Mike Reynolds	Michael Forest
The Lens	Tadashi Yokouchi	Tom Wyner	Alexandra Kenworthy
LaVerne Thorndyke	Takeshi Aono	Steve Kramer	Dave Mallow
Sol	Yuko Saito	Theodore Lehmann	Robert Axelrod
Blakslee	Yasuo Tanaka	Unknown	Doug Stone
Zuilk	Shingo Kanemoto	Kerrigan Mahan	Milton James

== Reception ==
The film received a mixed reception.

The GURPS supplement for Lensman references the film.
