= Iceberg that sank the Titanic =

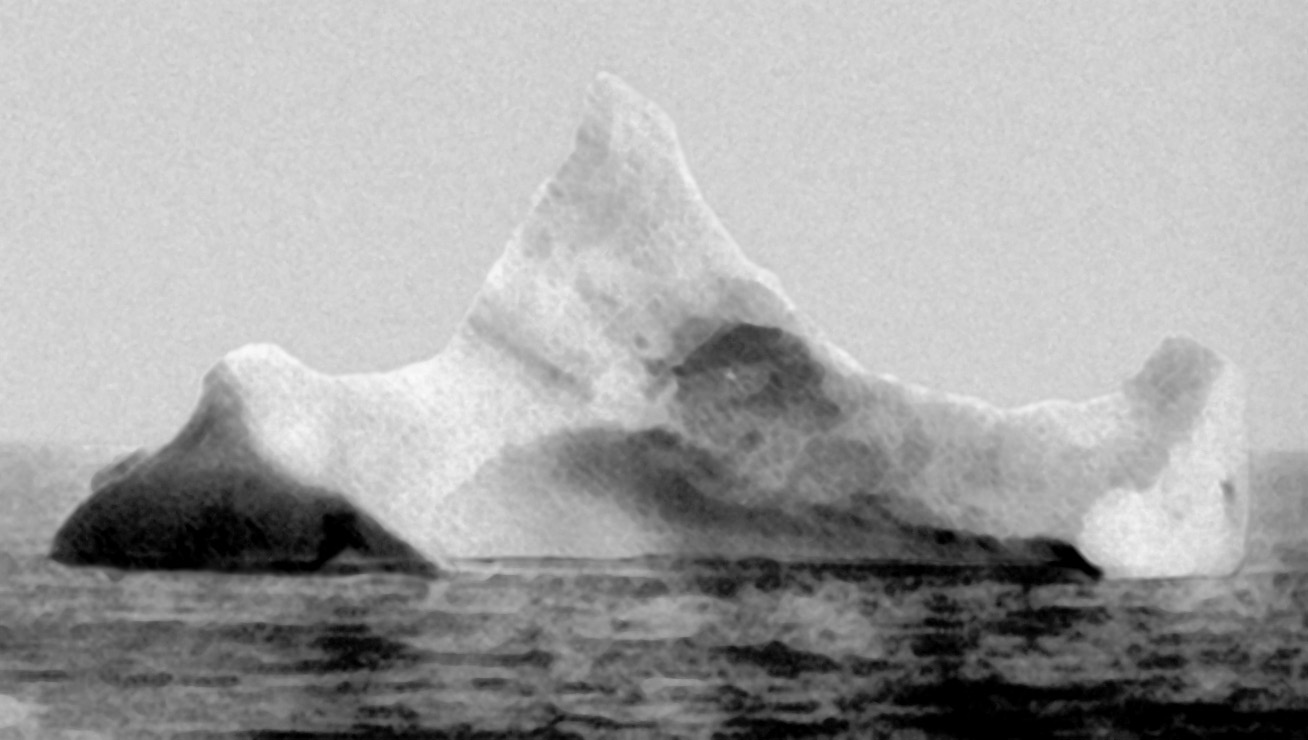
The iceberg photographed on the morning of 15 April by the chief steward of the Prinz Adalbert who, before learning of the collision, noticed a red smear along the iceberg's base. Other icebergs are also claimed to have had red streaks.

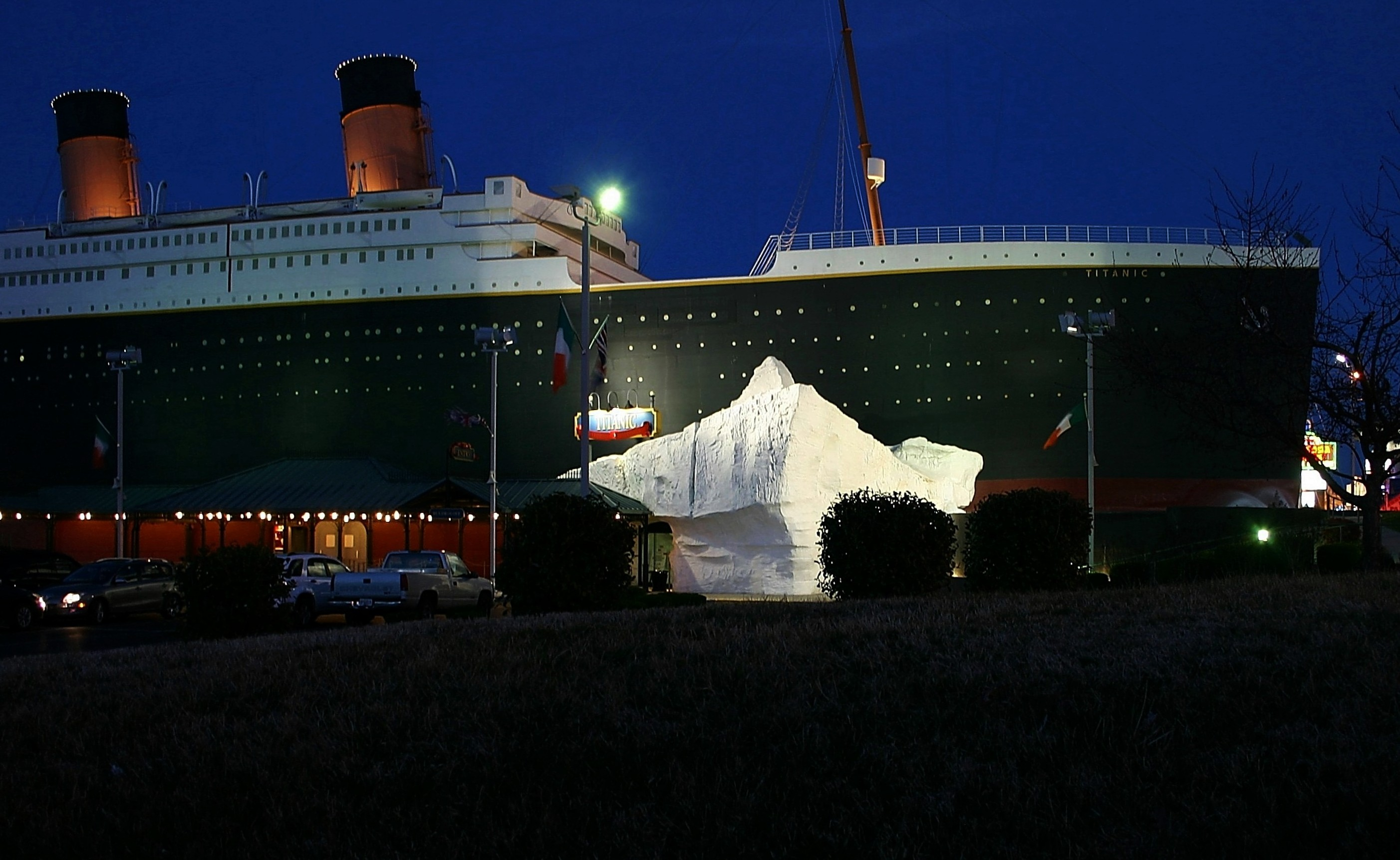
The iceberg model at the Titanic Museum Attraction in Branson, Missouri

On the night of 14–15 April 1912 in the North Atlantic, the passenger liner Titanic collided with an iceberg and sank. There were investigations into the iceberg and the fatal damage the collision caused to the supposedly unsinkable ship with several surviving crew and passengers having claimed to have seen it.

The iceberg was often seen metaphorically as a counterpart to the luxurious ship, standing for the cold and silent force of nature that cost the lives of around 1,500 people. It was also seen in various political and religious contexts, and has appeared in poetry as well as in pop culture.

== Origin and fate ==
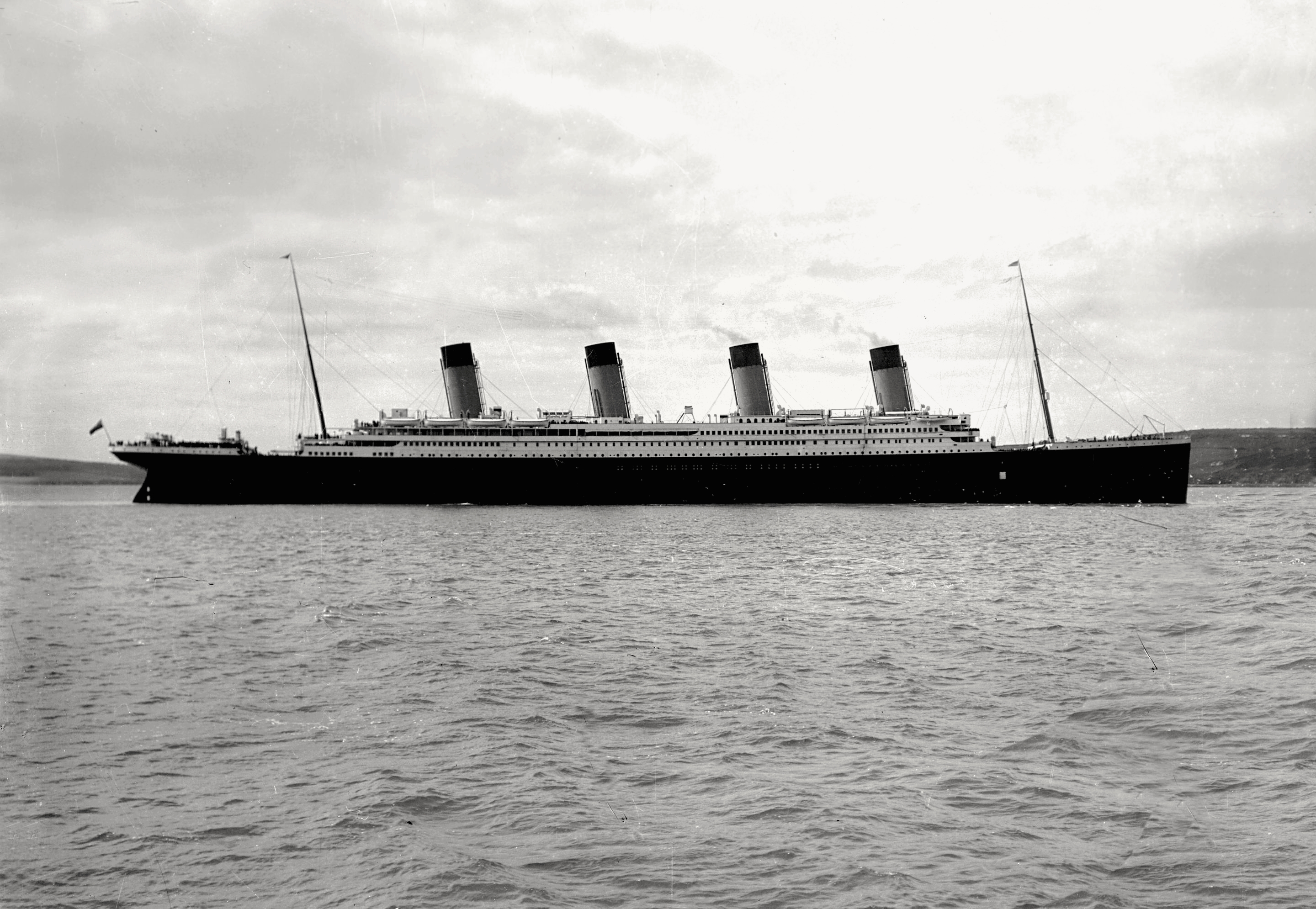
Titanic as she leaves the Irish port of Queenstown on 11 April 1912. This was the last stop before the voyage into the North Atlantic.

It can only be speculated where and when the Titanic iceberg calved from its glacier. Olson, Doescher, and Sinnott suspect the origin of the fatal iceberg in the Jakobshavn Glacier near Disko Bay on Greenland's west coast. It may have formed in 1910 or 1911 and could have drifted north with the West Greenland Current into Baffin Bay, from where it would have drifted south again thanks to the Labrador Current. An iceberg can, for example, be washed up on the coast or run aground. There it melts, or it comes free again and continues its journey south.

The authors also address the question of whether a certain constellation of the Sun, Earth, and Moon may have had an influence. On 4 January 1912, there was a spring tide at the same time that the Moon was closer to the Earth than usual. This could have influenced the calving of icebergs. Although an iceberg so calved would hardly have reached the site of Titanic disaster in April of the same year, the spring tide may have played a role in refloating a stranded iceberg.

Bigg and Wilton doubt that the solar arrangement of the Moon, Earth, and Sun in question was significant. A few days around 4 January would not have had much influence on calving; in winter, moreover, many fjords were blocked by sea ice. There was also increased iceberg formation in other years. When it comes to calving, they tend to think of factors like the water surface temperature of the Labrador Sea.

Titanic's route across the North Atlantic, with the location of her wreck

For their part, Bigg and Wilton have tried to show a possible path of the fatal iceberg with the help of computer simulations. To do this, they assumed that icebergs at that time originated mainly in the south or southwest of Greenland, whereas today they originate more from the northwest of the island. In 1912, more icebergs were sighted than on average in the 20th century, but it was not an extreme iceberg year.

The warm and wet year 1908 created the conditions for a huge iceberg to travel in the early autumn of 1911 near southwest Greenland. This would have traveled west towards Canada and been transported south by the Labrador Current – along the Canadian coast and the island of Newfoundland, the so-called Iceberg Alley. Because of the systematic observations of icebergs at the time (even before the Ice Patrol was established), it is even very likely, according to Bigg and Wilton, that the later fatal iceberg was sighted in the process.

From 10 to 15 April, there was a high-pressure area over most of the North Atlantic. It remained there for the first three days of Titanic's voyage, ensuring calm seas and clear skies. On 13 April, a depression over Greenland with cold polar air and winds from the northwest drove icebergs south into the shipping lanes. Because of the calm sea, the icebergs hardly created any breakwaters, making them difficult to see at night.

On its way into the Atlantic and also after the collision, the iceberg melted because of the water temperature. An iceberg exists for about two to three years, often in a state of vertical rotation as underwater melting changes the center of gravity of the top-heavy mass. Accordingly, if the fatal iceberg calved in 1910 or 1911, it may not have disappeared until the end of 1912 or even during 1913. However, considering that the iceberg may have been three years old at the time of the collision, it probably existed for only a week or two after the April 1912 accident, because it may soon have reached the warmer waters of the Gulf Stream.

== Ice warnings ==
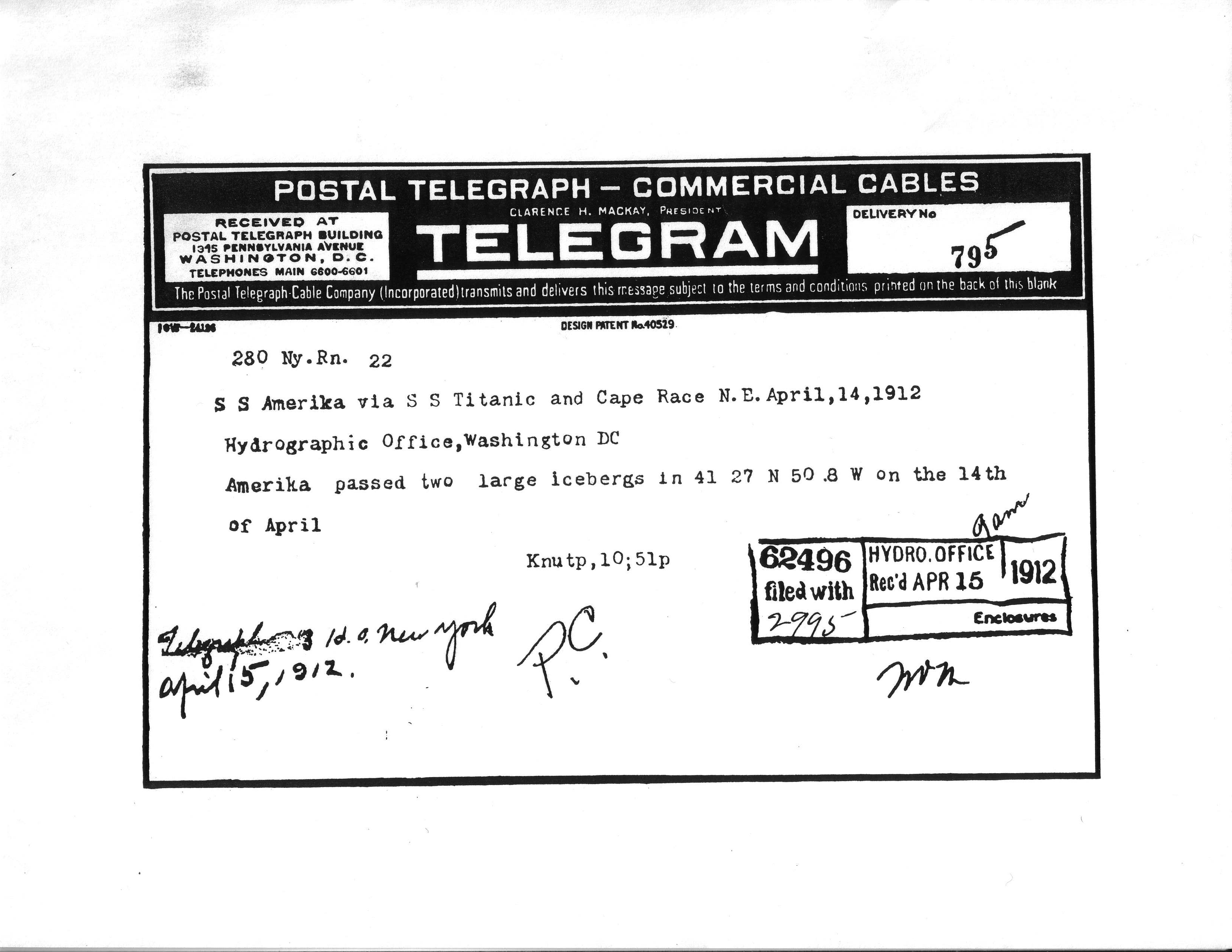
One of seven ice warnings received by the Titanic

Ice warnings sent to Titanic on 14 April 1912

Captain Edward Smith and his officers knew before they left Southampton that the drift ice field was larger in extent and more southernly than in previous years. Additionally, Titanic's wireless operators received seven messages from other ships warning of drifting ice.

The first warning came on 12 April from SS La Touraine, a French liner, at 17:46. The message reported two separate ice fields and two icebergs as well as dense fog and "derelicts." Captain Smith acknowledged the receipt of this message. It was the only ice warning the ship received prior to 14 April.

On 14 April, an ice report came at 09:12 from the RMS Caronia reporting "bergs, growlers, and field ice". Captain Smith acknowledged receipt of the message. At 10:28, the Caronia also forwarded an ice report from the SS Noordam which stated that "much ice" was reported to them. Smith also acknowledged this message.

At 13:54, RMS Baltic relayed a report from the Greek ship Athenia that she had been "passing icebergs and large quantities of field ice". Smith also acknowledged this report. He showed it to White Star Line chairman J. Bruce Ismay, aboard Titanic for her maiden voyage, who later showed it to a few passengers before returning it to Smith after the Captain asked for it back a few hours later.

It remains uncertain whether other officers saw the marconigram. Ismay was the director of the White Star Line, which owned Titanic. The incident with the Baltic marconigram fueled rumors that Ismay had exerted undue influence on the captain to keep Titanic from slowing down despite ice warnings. Thus, in the enquiries after the disaster, people wondered why Captain Smith showed Ismay the marconigram in the first place.

At 13:49, the German ship SS Amerika, which was a short distance to the south, reported she had "passed two large icebergs" and asked the Titanic to forward the message to the Hydrographic Office in Washington, D.C.. There is no evidence as to whether or not this message reached Captain Smith or to the bridge but it was acknowledged by the wireless operator aboard Titanic and forwarded to Washington via Cape Race wireless station, Newfoundland at 21:32. (Note: George E. Turnbull, Deputy-Manager of the Marconi International Marine Communication Company which employed wireless operators for British merchant ships, later testified that this message would be considered and treated as a private message rather than as an official navigational message, and it was up to the operator's own judgement as to whether or not to forward a message like this to the bridge.)

At 19:37, the SS Californian reported "three large bergs" to the SS Antillian, a message which was intercepted by junior wireless operator Harold Bride who took it to the bridge and later acknowledged its receipt to the Californian. At 21:52, the steamship SS Mesaba reported: "Saw much heavy pack ice and great number large icebergs. Also field ice." It is unclear whether or not this message left the Titanic's radio room as Jack Phillips, the radio operator on watch at the time, did not survive. He acknowledged the message, as per Mesaba's wireless officer Stanley Adams, but the surviving officers could not recall seeing it later.

A final message was received around 22:07 from operator Cyril Evans of Californian, who signalled, "Say, old man, we are stopped and surrounded by ice." Phillips signalled back to Evans to stop transmitting, as the ship's stronger signal was interfering with the fainter one from Cape Race. He was preoccupied with transmitting messages for passengers via the relay station at Cape Race; as the radio set had broken down the day before, there was a backlog of messages that Phillips was trying to clear and the informal-sounding message by Evans was not sent with an official mark of "MSG" and also lacked coordinates.

=== Messages received by bridge ===
By 1912, the wireless machine aboard ships was still a relatively new feature. Several ships carried one wireless operator, with Titanic being one of the few exceptions. It was seen more of a service to passengers rather than a necessary tool for navigation. Hence, there was no system for collecting and evaluating ice warnings, particularly for cases such as the Amerika warning which was received by the ship as a private message. The wireless operators, Phillips and Bride, were employees of the Marconi Marine Company and likely followed their general orders with regards to ice reports.

Additionally, ships treated hazard warnings as advisories rather than calls to action. It was widely believed that ice posed little risk; close calls were not uncommon, and even head-on collisions had not been disastrous. One example had occurred on Titanic's sailing day: on 10 April 1912, the French liner SS Niagara struck an icefield not far from where Titanic would a few days later, but managed to steam under her own power to New York.

It is unclear whether or not all the messages reached the bridge, as Phillips, Captain Smith, and three officers died in the sinking. In particular, the Mesaba and Amerika messages were not recalled by either Bride or any surviving officers. However, it is known that majority of the ice warnings received by the operators had been communicated to Captain Smith, as he acknowledged them in return. He was aware that there was ice in the area and, according to Second Officer Charles Lightoller, discussed this with him in length. Additionally, both lookouts were told to keep an eye out for "small ice and growlers" by Lightoller on the night of disaster and he passed this information onto First Officer William Murdoch who took over the watch at 10:00 PM.

== Iceberg visibility ==
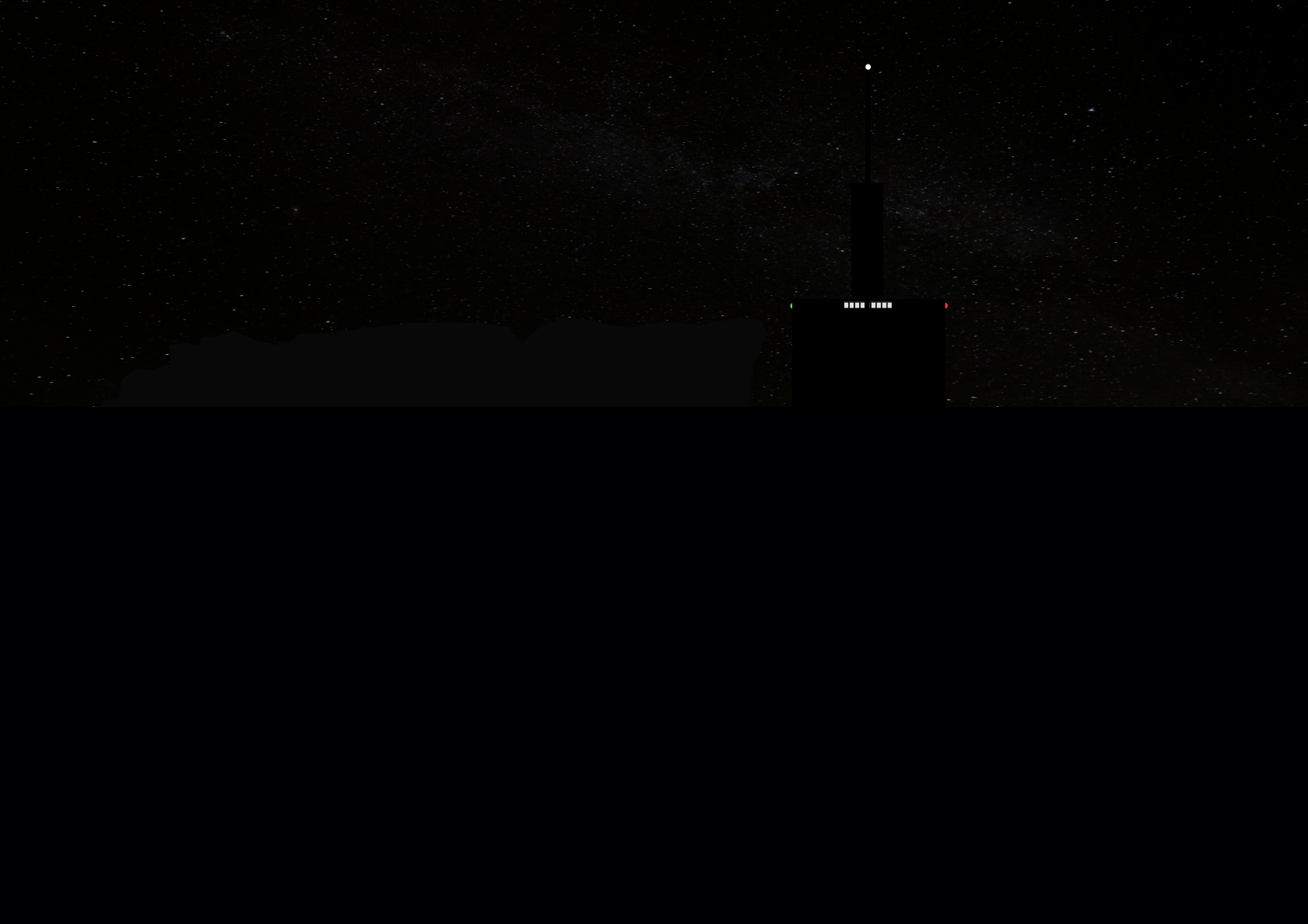
The possible visibility as Titanic approached the iceberg (iceberg at left, ship seen from the front)

On the night of the disaster, Captain Smith assumed that an iceberg would be discovered in time so that it could still be avoided. The decisive factor for him was that the night in question was clear and cloudless. It was generally believed at the time that on clear, albeit dark, nights one could see an iceberg within one to three nautical miles. (Note: Three nautical miles equals 5.6 kilometres (3.5 mi).) According to surviving Second Officer Charles Lightoller, he and Smith believed an iceberg was visible at three to four nautical miles. Smith had said that at the slightest sign of haze, the ship should proceed very slowly. The lookouts were instructed to pay particular attention to ice.

In 1925, Fred Zeusler of the United States Coast Guard was in charge of the International Ice Patrol. According to his research, a medium-sized iceberg could be seen a nautical mile away on a moonless, dark but clear night. On the night of Titanic disaster in 1912, Halpern says, the sea was calm and smooth. Therefore, an iceberg could not be seen from the break of the waves. The only light that could have come from an iceberg would have been reflected starlight. Visibility would have been even worse in the low-hanging haze purported to be extant on the night of the ship's sinking, but survivors' testimonies contradict each other as to whether there was any; other ships reported no haze whatsoever. Possible explanations could be that the witnesses understood different things by 'haze', or that instead of haze, the ice field was actually seen, towards which Titanic was heading and because of which the Californian had already stopped.

== Sighting and collision ==
On Sunday 14 April at 23:40 board time, Titanic collided with an iceberg. Some survivors saw the iceberg with their own eyes, others perceived a dark shadow. There are also statements about pieces of ice that fell from the iceberg onto the ship. Furthermore, there are statements about how contact with the iceberg was heard or felt.

After the two men in Titanic's crow's nest sighted the iceberg, one of them, Frederick Fleet, sounded the bell three times to signal that he had seen an object straight ahead of the ship. However, the iceberg may have been seen on the bridge promptly or even simultaneously. According to Fleet's colleague Reginald Lee, the iceberg was only half a nautical mile away (about 900 metres) when it was sighted. According to the British enquiry after the accident, the iceberg was 1,500 feet (0.25 nmi; 460 m) away at the time of the sighting. For a ship moving at 22.5 knots (41.7 km/h), the iceberg would accordingly have been sighted 40 seconds before impact.

What the evasive manoeuvre may have looked like: Titanic, coming from the east (on the right in the picture), first goes to the left and then to the right, so that the stern, which is swinging out, does not hit the iceberg. (Bow in blue, stern in red.)

Titanic was still able to steer slightly to port (left) before the impact. Nevertheless, she scraped against the iceberg, which lasted several seconds. As it turned out later, the iceberg caused several leaks on the forward starboard side in the process. Because of Titanic's high speed, which could not be stopped so quickly, part of the iceberg pressed against the hull below the waterline. This pressure caused rivets to come loose and the outer skin to develop narrow, elongated leaks. Two hours and forty minutes after the impact, the ship sank.

Writer Walter Lord questions whether the iceberg itself may not have been damaged. During the impact under water on the forward side of the ship, ice could have already been scraped off the iceberg to such an extent that the iceberg no longer caused any leaks on the aft starboard side. Fitch, Layton and Wormstedt, on the other hand, follow the thesis that the ship was not damaged aft for a different reason. Initially, the helmsman was indeed ordered to turn to the left, but shortly afterwards he was told to let the ship turn to the right. This manoeuvre, ordered by the First Officer William M. Murdoch, probably prevented Titanic from shearing off with its stern and touching the iceberg again.

=== Witness statements about the iceberg ===
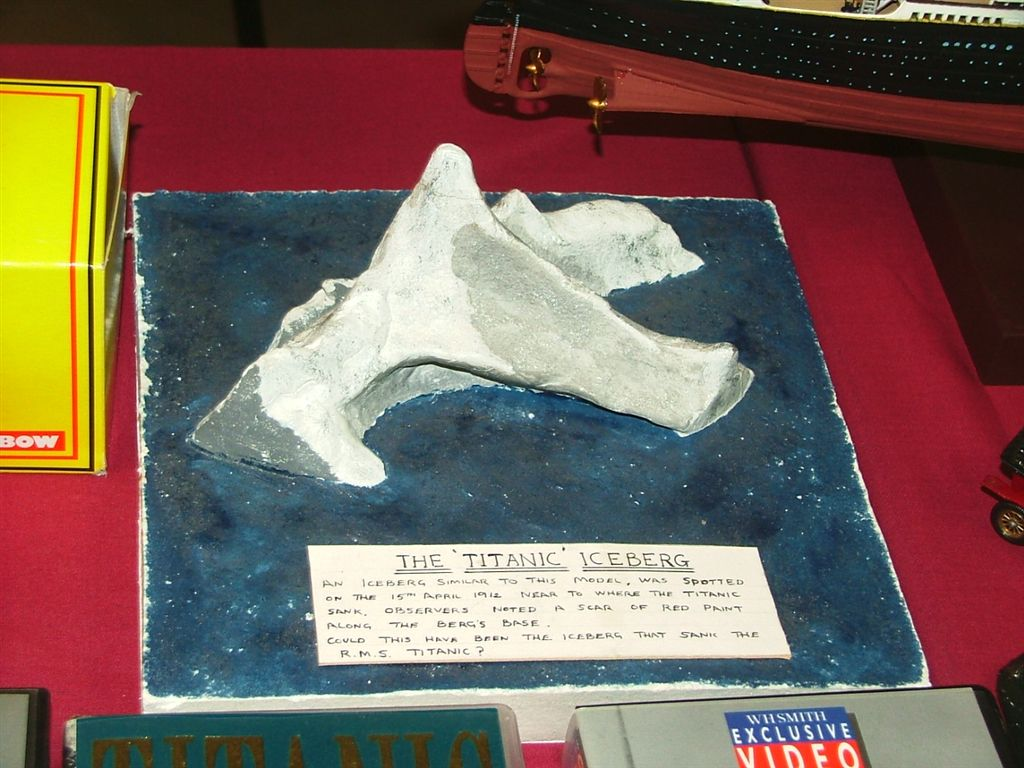
At Titanic Museum Branson: a model of one of those icebergs captured in a photograph near the site of the disaster

The accident happened twenty minutes before midnight, when hardly anyone was on the decks, explaining why relatively few people saw the iceberg with their own eyes. Witnesses included, above all, the lookouts Frederick Fleet and Reginald Lee, who both survived.

Lee was the first of the two to be interviewed in the British enquiry. According to him, the iceberg was a dark mass coming through a haze. As the iceberg passed, he saw a white fringe at the top, and only there. Viewed from astern, one side appeared to be white and the other black. It was higher than the foredeck (which was 55 feet (17 m) above the waterline). The attorney-general suspected that by this time the ship had shed some light on the iceberg; Lee concurred.

Fleet could not remember who saw the iceberg first. He saw a black object high above the water, slightly higher than the foredeck. Unlike Lee, Fleet did not remember any haze.

Other surviving crew members had their own accounts of the iceberg:

- Quartermaster Alfred Olliver came onto the open bridge from port and saw the tip of the iceberg rushing past the ship. According to Olliver, the iceberg was about as high as the boat deck or a little higher. He only saw the tip of the iceberg, so he could not estimate its width. Unexpectedly, the iceberg was not white, but a kind of dark blue.
- Quartermaster George Rowe stood under the docking bridge at the stern and hurried towards starboard after feeling the vibration. He saw the tall iceberg slide by less than 10 feet (3.0 m) from the ship. He feared the berg would strike the edge of the docking bridge. The iceberg was about 100 ft (30 m) high.
- Able seaman Joseph Scarott was at the forecastle head; he heard the lookouts ring the warning bell, and felt the ship tremble "in the same manner as if the engines had been suddenly reversed to full speed astern." He went below to inform one of his watchmates, who was in the bathroom, and rushed out on deck in time to see the iceberg on the starboard side. At the British inquiry, he described the iceberg as resembling the "Rock of Gibraltar looking at it from Europa Point... only much smaller."

Soon after the collision, Captain Smith had rushed to the bridge and asked Murdoch, "What have we struck?" When told it was an iceberg, Smith, Murdoch and Fourth Officer Joseph Boxhall went to the starboard side of the bridge to look for the berg. Boxhall, the only survivor among them, was unsure if he still recognised the shape of the berg because he had come out from inside the ship and his eyes were still adjusting to the darkness.

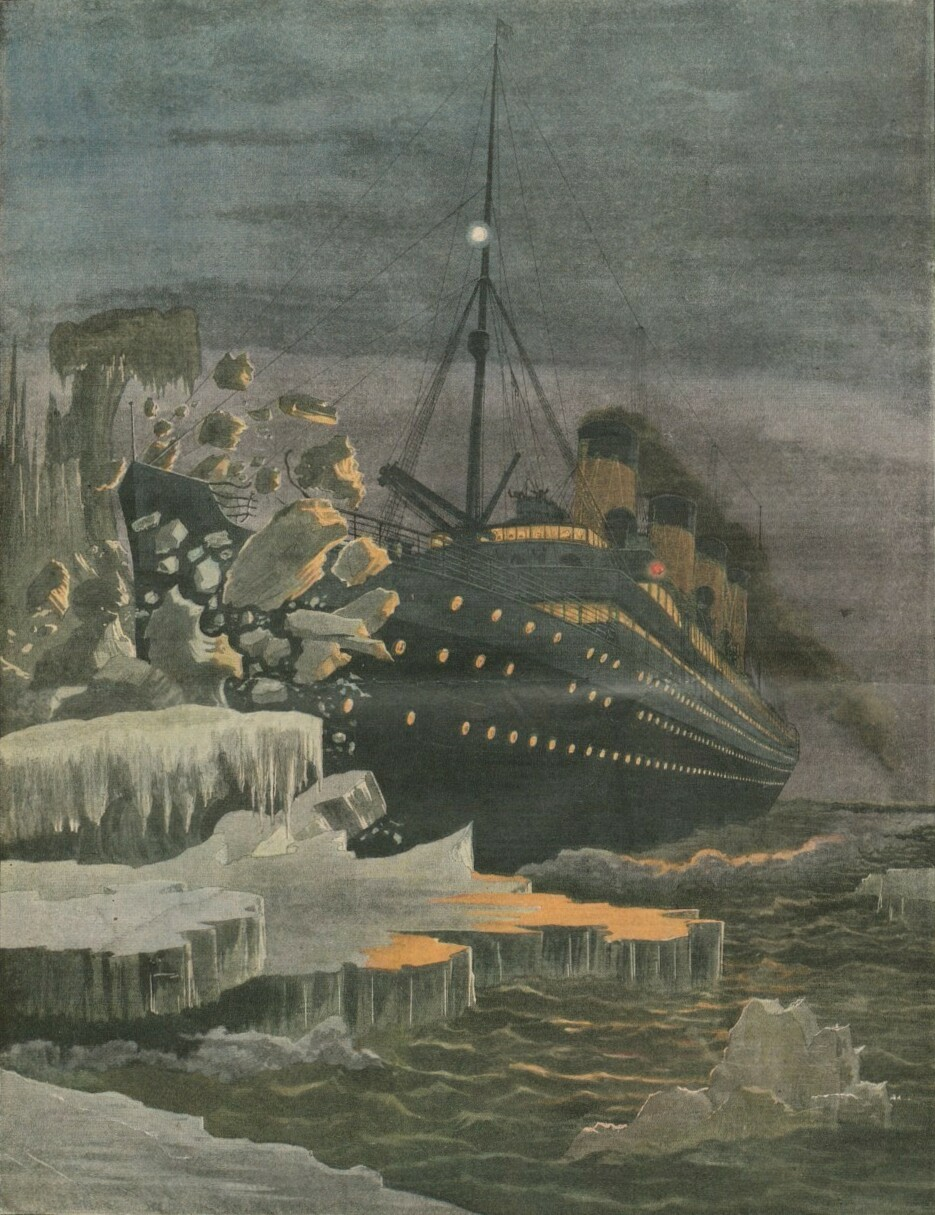
From Le Petit Journal, Paris, 28 April 1912: the very earliest depictions of the disaster are fantasy drawings with no knowledge of the size of the iceberg or the nature of the collision.

Passengers either noticed the iceberg as a dark shadow or a white mass that passed by the ship, or sighted the iceberg later from the deck:

- Edith Rosenbaum looked out from her first-class cabin, shortly after the shaking, onto the enclosed promenade deck. She saw a "ghostly wall of white" pass by. George Rheims and Frederick and Jane Hoyt observed something similar. Rosenbaum then went on deck, where there were only five passengers, including William T. Stead. They saw the pieces of ice on the deck and learned from Francis Millet: "Iceberg. [...] We all turned with renewed interest to the great floating mountain of white. It had drifted some distance to starboard and rose indistinctly and mysteriously in the velvet darkness."
- Emma Bucknell and her maid Albina Bazzani saw the iceberg pass by the window in their cabin on D deck. Because of this and the ice on corridors, she dismissed the rumour heard on board that the iceberg was under water. Another woman had said it was higher than D deck, which seemed plausible to Bucknell.
- Eleanor Cassebeer was alarmed by the commotion and went to promenade deck A. With Harry Anderson she went towards the bow. Probably from the railing of the promenade deck they saw small pieces of ice lying about. From here they saw the berg rising about 75 to 100 feet (23 to 30 m) out of the sea. They met the ship's designer Thomas Andrews there, whose cabin was nearby. It can be surmised that if they saw the iceberg, Andrews likely did as well.
- Albert and Vera Dick had been woken by the shock and went out onto a deck. Vera remembered seeing the iceberg.
- William Sloper and stewards had rushed onto the deck and were still able to get a quick look at the iceberg.

=== Witness statements about the collision ===
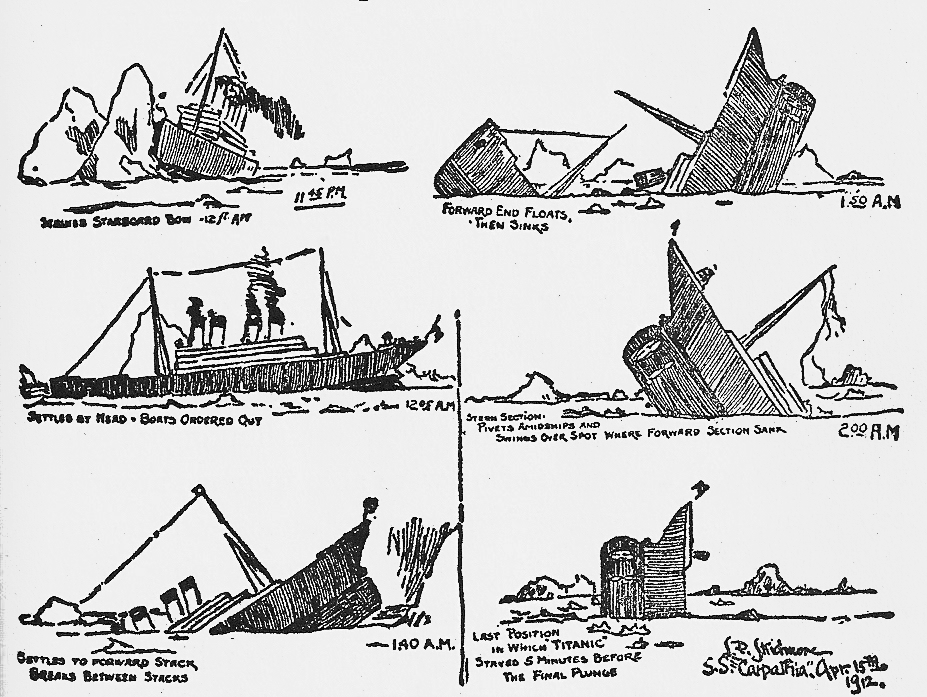
A 15 April 1912 drawing based on 17-year old survivor Jack Thayer's description of the sinking, drawn by L. P. Skidmore on the rescue ship Carpathia

A number of passengers later described the experience of the collision as a 'slight shock' or 'jar'. The sound was described by Carrie Chaffee, for example, as if someone was pulling a chain against the side of the ship. Charlotte Collyer experienced the collision as "a long backward jerk, followed by a shorter forward one". Others were not awakened by the impact, or only by the engines stopping soon afterwards, like 12-year-old Ruth Becker. Some went back to sleep; others were extremely concerned.

The iceberg and Titanic in a 1913 painting by Harry J. Jansen

Parts of the iceberg also hit Titanic's superstructure on the starboard side. As it passed the forward corrugated deck, large pieces of ice broke off and fell onto the deck of the ship. However, ice from the iceberg could not only be found on the deck:

- First class passenger Edwin Kimball reported ice entering his cabin through the porthole.
- Margaret Swift and Alice Leader were visited by a man holding ice in his hands. He said it was all over the corridor under the portholes.
- In the corridor, Emma Bucknell saw that ice had fallen through a broken porthole onto the floor. She dressed warmly. Back in the corridor she saw two young women talking, one of whom could not believe that the ship had been hit by an iceberg. Bucknell went to the end of the corridor, took pieces of ice and showed them to the women as proof.
- Edith Rosenbaum saw it on the deck: "Someone suggested a snow fight, but it was too cold for that."
- Salon steward Alexander Littlejohn saw 2 feet (0.61 m) of ice in the scuppers (drains for rain or sea water) on the starboard side of the forward well deck.
- Gladys Cherry and her cousin, Noël Leslie, Countess of Rothes, Alfred Nourney and the Third Officer Pitman saw ice on the well deck.
- Young Jack Thayer and his parents did not see an iceberg, though his father thought he saw pieces of ice floating in the sea.

Comparison of iceberg and ship, according to Bigg and Wilton's estimate of the iceberg. The appearance of the iceberg must remain speculative.

Bigg and Wilton describe the Titanic iceberg, based on witness testimony, as 50 to 100 feet (15 to 30 m) high and 400 feet (120 m) long. They assume that only 16.7 per cent of a weathered iceberg is above the water surface. Consequently, the fatal iceberg would have been at least 90 to 185 metres (295 to 607 ft) deep and approximately 125 metres (410 ft) long.

Icebergs usually melt on the sides. When the centre of gravity is finally too high, an iceberg tips over. If the fatal iceberg was indeed about 125 m (410 ft) long, the total height would have been up to 100 m (330 ft). Above the water surface, it would therefore have been 15 to 17 m (49 to 56 ft) high, which would fit the witness statements about the height (above the water surface). The mass would have been 2 megatons. According to witnesses, the iceberg had one or two conspicuous peaks, which rules out a table berg.

For size comparison, Titanic, the largest ship in the world at the time, had a total length of 882 feet and 9 inches (around 269 metres). She was up to 92 feet and 6 inches wide (about 28 metres). Her draught (from waterline to keel) was 34 feet and 6 inches (about 10 metres) in front. The mastheads, when the ship was fully loaded, were about 205 feet (62.5 metres) above the water.

== Photographs of the iceberg ==
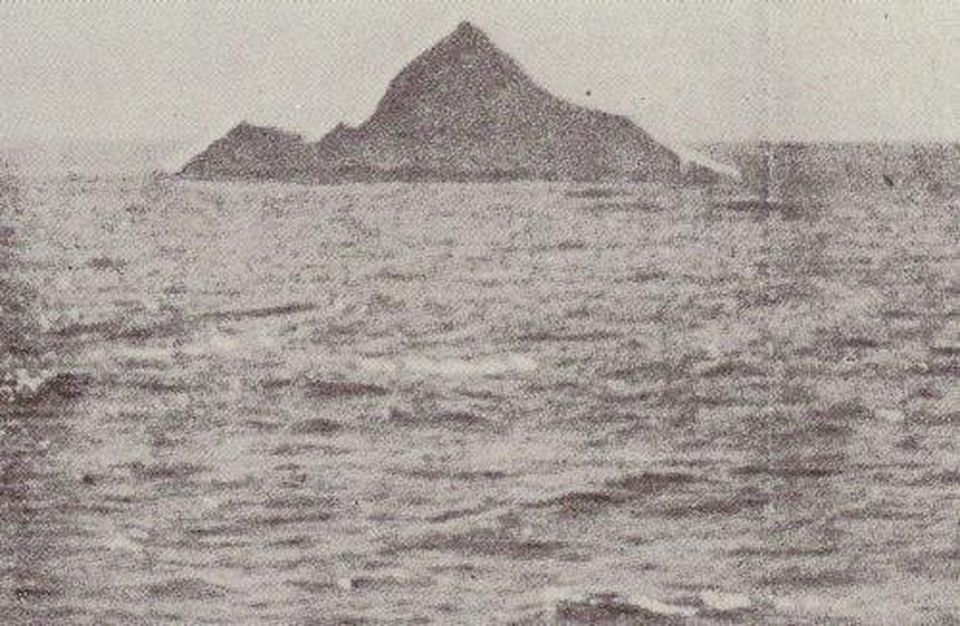
The iceberg photographed from Birma

Various ships were in the vicinity of the accident, or at the site where the lifeboats were found. Crew members or passengers on such ships took photographs of icebergs. Some of them were said to have been the iceberg that sank Titanic. The crew of the SS Birma also photographed what they believed to be the iceberg.

Attempts have been made to match the shape of the icebergs in question with the descriptions, and in some cases a line of red paint (from the hull of the ship) was said to have been seen. It should be borne in mind, however, that the drift was continuously driving the icebergs southwards. Moreover, in that April 1912, nearly 400 icebergs crossed the 48th parallel to the south (at Newfoundland, where they have been counted). A certain proportion of these reached the area of Titanic disaster.

The photographs may nevertheless be of lasting interest. In October 2015, for example, CNN reported on an auction at which one of the iceberg photographs was to be sold. It was a photograph taken aboard the steamer Prinz Adalbert on the morning of 15 April. A note about it from the photographer, a steward on the ship, reported red paint visible on the iceberg. The photo had hung for decades on the walls of a law firm that provided legal representation to the White Star Line. She had bought it shortly after the accident from another client, Hamburg-Amerika-Line. This client had heard that the law firm would represent the owners of Titanic with regard to liability. When the firm closed in 2002, the four partners put the photo with the note of red paint up for auction. The auction house Henry Aldridge & Son in Devizes, England, estimated its value at between £10,000 to £15,000.

In that CNN report, ice researcher Steve Bruneau explains that the ice of the iceberg behaved like rock during the collision. It is quite possible, he says, that paint was scraped off the ship and pressed into the ice. As long as it did make contact with the water and as long as it stayed cool, the paint could have been visible on the iceberg for a day or more.

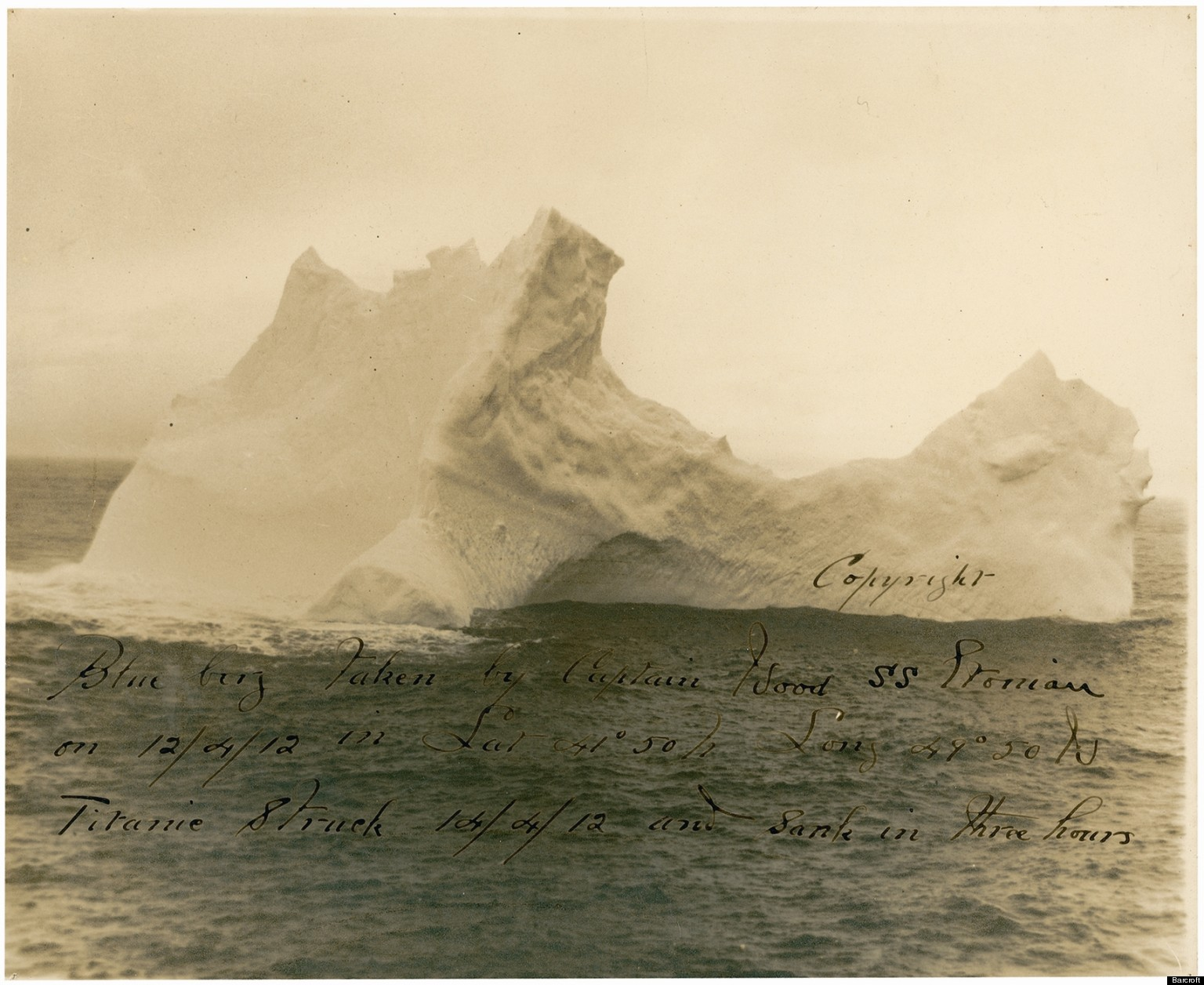
Captain W. F. Wood of the Etonian photographed an iceberg on 12 April, suspected to be the one struck by the Titanic two days later

In 2020, the same auction house announced another auction. This iceberg photo came from Captain Wood of the SS Etonian and was taken as early as 16:00 on 12 April. Wood gave a position at the time (41° 30′ 0″ N, 49° 30′ 0″ W), and it had turned out to be almost exactly where Titanic hit her iceberg 40 hours later. In a 1913 letter, Wood described the photograph. Henry Aldridge & Son estimated its value at £12,000. (However, the position mentioned is 47 kilometres; 30 miles south-east of the wreck).

Another photo of an iceberg mentioned in the literature was taken by Hope Chapin. She was on her honeymoon aboard the Carpathia and took the photo at daybreak. Carpathia passenger Bernice Palmer also took several pictures of the aftermath of the sinking with her Kodak Brownie camera, including an image alleged to be "the iceberg identified as the one which sank Titanic, almost certainly identified by the survivors". She allowed Underwood & Underwood, a New York photography agency, to develop, print and return the pictures along with the tiny sum of $10.00 in exchange for the right to publish the photographs. In the contract she signed, two of the images are described as the "iceberg and icefield run into by Titanic".

Bigg and Wilton see the estimated size proportions of the iceberg reflected in the one photographed by Captain de Carteret. He was in command of the CS Minia, which was searching for bodies at the (supposed) disaster site. According to Bigg and Wilton, the photo shows a red streak of colour.

== Cultural reception ==
A story has developed around the historic disaster of the passenger liner Titanic with which certain elements are inextricably linked, say Brown, McDonagh and Shultz. These include not only the magnitude of the disaster and the haughty claim of the ship's unsinkability, but also the "nemesis of Mother Nature's iceberg".

There are numerous non-fiction books and novels about Titanic. But it takes two to make a collision, says Philip Morrison in a review of a book by marine biologist Richard Brown. In Voyage of the Iceberg, Brown describes the disaster from the perspective of the iceberg and, moreover, the possible journey of the iceberg along nature and people in the far north.

A counterpart in poetry is the poem "The Iceberg" by the Canadian Charles G. D. Roberts. In the first-person perspective, the iceberg, an 'alp afloat,' narrates its life journey from its formation on the glacier to its dissolution in the ocean. In the collision, the broadside of Titanic creeps under the iceberg, which pierces and tears open the hull with a submerged horn. The funnels crash against the rocky slope and the huge mass of the iceberg sinks down onto the ship, wiping it out.

=== Metaphorical use ===
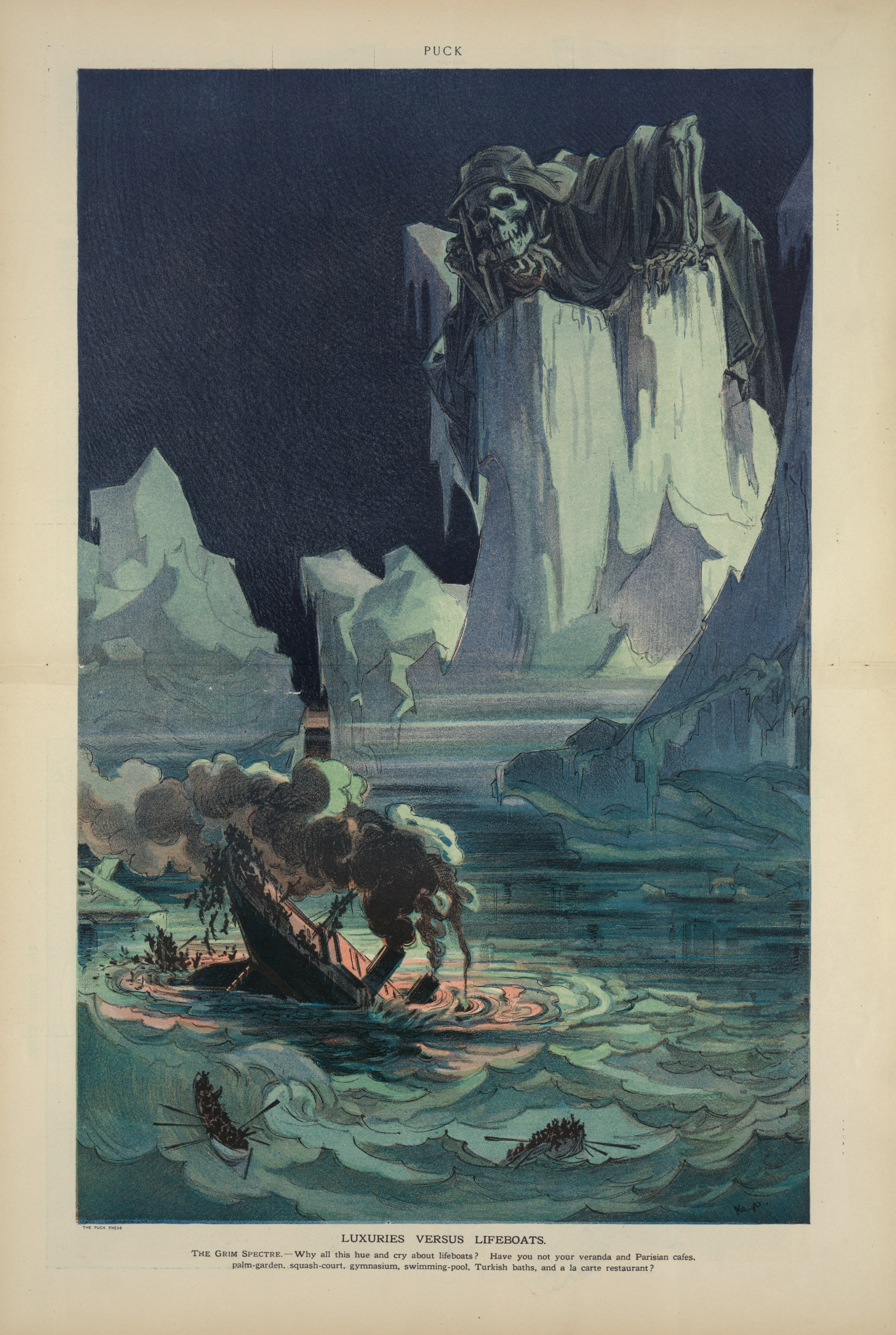
An allegorical depiction in the weeks following the disaster (Udo J. Keppler, 1912)

Not only Titanic, which stands for luxury, but also the iceberg has inspired numerous authors and visual artists. It was common to depict the iceberg as a monster in caricatures. Religious authors denounced a lack of respect for God and the forces of nature, which included the iceberg. The ice warnings that had been ignored by Titanic appeared as "the writing on the wall". Meanwhile, in leftist publications, the iceberg was sometimes compared to the proletariat: It was causing capitalism (Titanic) to sink.

As a product of a Belfast shipyard, Titanic could also be seen as a symbol of Protestant pride – which was in danger of being sunk by the cool "iceberg dynamics" of Irish nationalism. The building and sinking of Titanic took place at the same time as the debates on Irish Home Rule. In the radio play The Iceberg (1975), Stewart Parker, a Northern Irish playwright, allows the ghosts of two shipyard workers who perished during the construction of Titanic to speak about the Northern Ireland conflict.

Author Stephen Kern sees an analogy between the Titanic disaster and the Sarajevo assassination that helped trigger the First World War: The icebergs on the steamer's route would stand in an analogy to the eight assassins who waited for Franz Ferdinand's carriage. In 2012, for example, Shetsova compared Russia under Putin to Titanic in search of its iceberg.

New metaphors or perspectives place the fatal iceberg, for example, within the context of climate change. The sea ice is receding and the melting of the Greenland glaciers will initially create more icebergs. However, due to global warming, the probability of large icebergs reaching the 45th parallel and endangering shipping there is decreasing. Sometimes icebergs are no longer seen as a threat, but as the freshwater source of the future.

=== Thomas Hardy ===
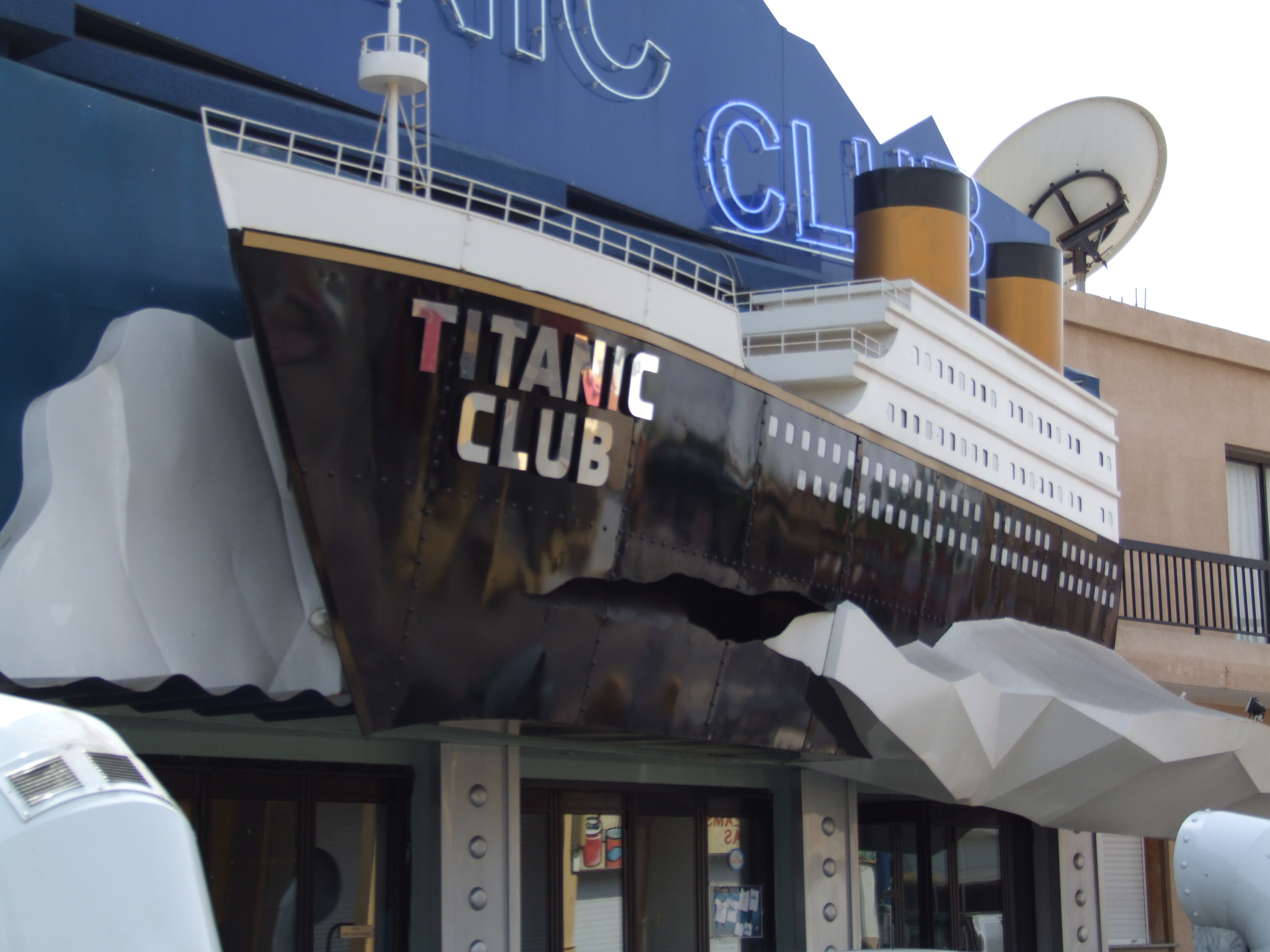
A bar in Agia Napa in Cyprus

As early as 1912, the British poet Thomas Hardy poetically processed the relationship between the ship and the iceberg, in a highly unusual way that defies all expectations. In the much-cited poem "The Convergence of the Twain", there is neither suffering nor death; instead, a blind, senseless will is at work, which, in the sense of Schopenhauer, has replaced the personal God of the Bible as a deity.

In "The Convergence of the Twain", Hardy first imagines the luxurious ship on the ocean floor. While people were building Titanic, the iceberg was growing in nature. Then, on the night of the disaster, fate brought ship and iceberg together.

In scholarly literature, explains Emerson Brown Jr., it has become a commonplace that Hardy's language used indicates human sexuality. Nor does speaking about two shaken hemispheres uniting simply refer to the two hemispheres of the world. Rather, it goes back to the Greek comedy writer Aristophanes: the gods divided the originally spherical human being into two parts as punishment, and hence comes his urge to unite in the sexual act.

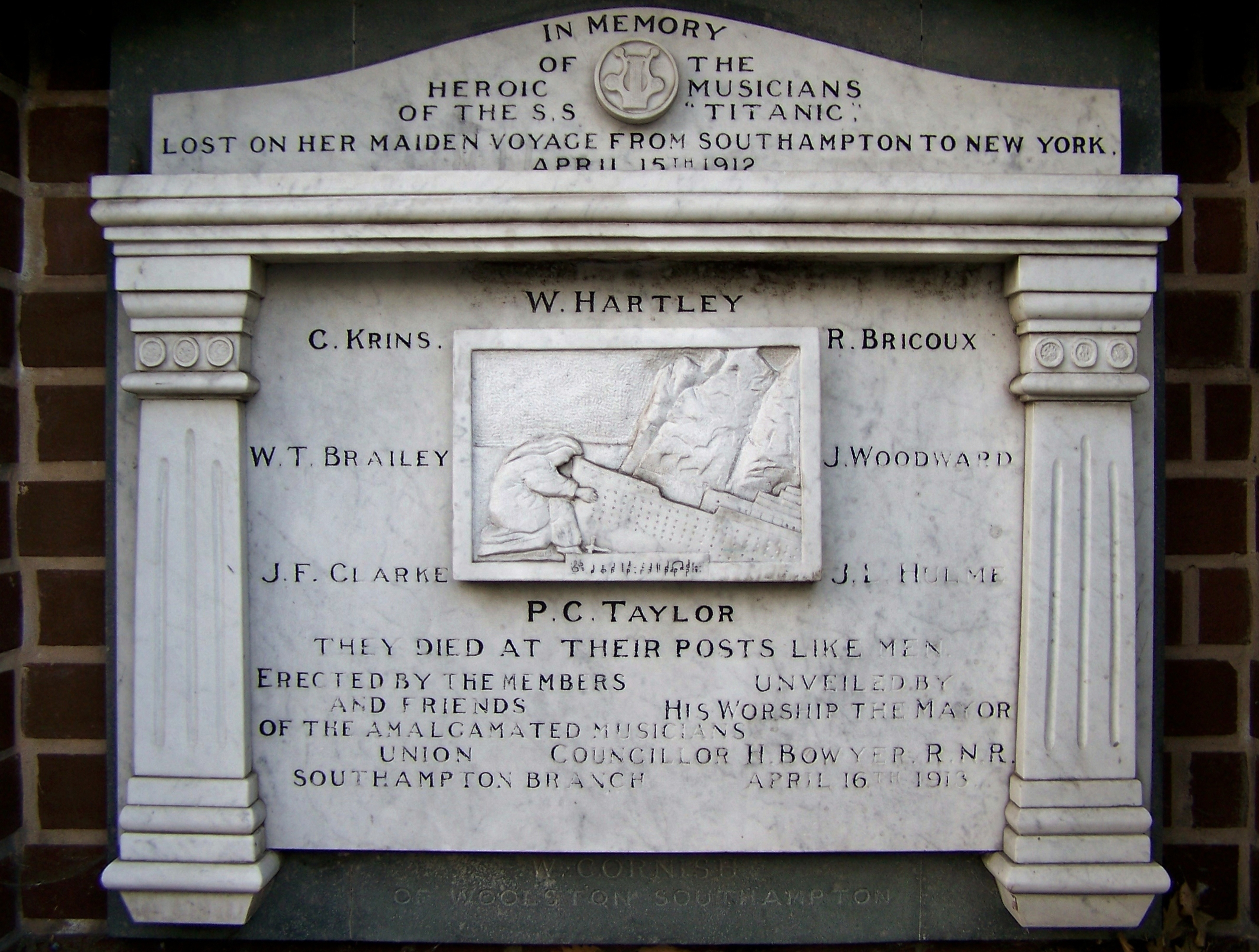
The iceberg on a memorial relief for the musicians aboard Titanic in Southampton, England

Furthermore, the poem alludes to marriage as it is discussed in the Gospel of Matthew between the Pharisees and Jesus. Man and woman, for example, appear in it as no longer twain, but one flesh, and the creature of cleaving wing (in the King James translation) also refers to this. There are other erotic and Christian references in Hardy's poem.

Thus Hardy sends the 1500 souls into the depths with an 'obscene pun', as Meredith Bergmann puts it. Consummation comes describes the sexual union of the ship, conceived as female, with the iceberg. But this line 33 also reflects the last words of the 33-year-old Jesus Christ: consummatum est (It is finished).

Emerson Brown Jr. says that the poem shows no compassion for the people who perished in the disaster. The dead children of the Third Class or the servants on Titanic do not appear at all, and at most the rich of the First Class are addressed with the opulence that now lies at the bottom of the sea. Hardy seems to applaud the iceberg, the 'sinister mate'. In Hardy's mythologising, according to Brown, the iceberg provides retribution by giving the ship and those who perished what they deserve.

Hardy, an otherwise sympathetic author who lost two friends on Titanic, did not write the poem at a great distance from the disaster, for the first manuscript is dated 24 April 1912 (nine days after the sinking). On 14 May, a matinée was held at Covent Garden in London to raise money for the bereaved, and Hardy wrote The Convergence of the Twain for the occasion. Emerson Brown Jr. wonders if the bereaved, who had just lost their loved ones, could appreciate Hardy's witty allusions – his ruthless artistry.

=== Folk and pop culture ===
There are numerous allusions to Titanic and its iceberg in American folk culture. In a song by the Dixon Brothers (1938), a band of cotton mill workers from South Carolina, the iceberg not only slashes the side of the ship but also cuts off Titanic's pride. A more recent example is a song by the Mrs. Ackroyd Band (1999), in which a sad polar bear asks for news about the iceberg on which his family has been living.

The iceberg appears with or without Titanic in many popular representations and contexts, for example as a set of ice cubes in a thematically fitting form.

In the 2017 Tony-nominated musical Titanique, the iceberg is anthropomorphized as actually having been singer Tina Turner, referred to as "The Iceberg Bitch", and has been portrayed by various male actors throughout the show's run on Off-Broadway, Broadway and the West End.

In April 2021, the American comedy show Saturday Night Live aired a sketch starring cast member Bowen Yang as "The Iceberg that sank Titanic". The sketch parodies the reactions of celebrities who have been involved in scandals. The iceberg sees himself as the one under attack, blames the ship, the ocean and the shipping company, claims that only 20 people died (after an initial claim of 30 deaths), and promotes his new music album.

=== Museal and miscellaneous ===
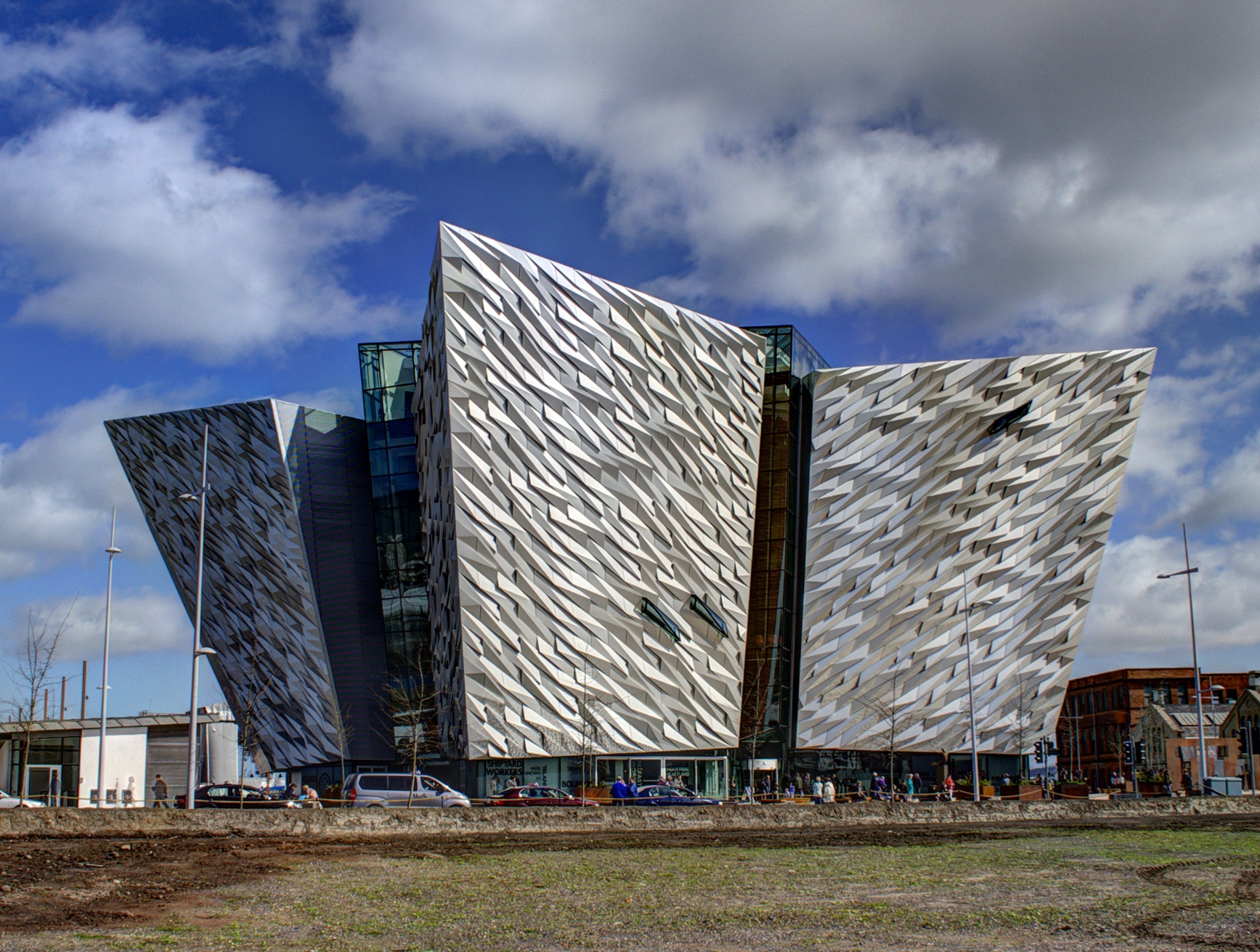
Titanic Belfast, an attraction in the capital of Northern Ireland

A place of remembrance for Titanic is the former site of the Harland & Wolff shipyard that built her. Among other things, Titanic Belfast, a conference centre and museum, opened on the redeveloped site in the 2012 anniversary year. Local editor Tony Canavan regrets that looking at Titanic Belfast reminds him of the appearance of an iceberg. (In fact, the building is meant to reflect the collision of iceberg and ship).

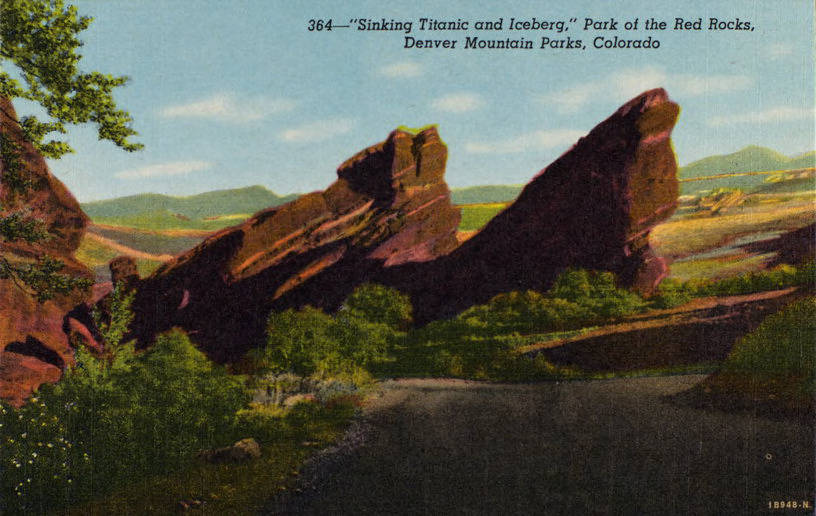
Two rock formations at Red Rocks Park near Denver named after Titanic and the iceberg

There is no 'monument' for the iceberg in the strict sense; it rarely appears on commemorative plaques for Titanic. In Red Rocks Park (near Denver, Colorado) there are two rocks named Sinking Titanic and Iceberg.

Large iceberg dummies can be seen at Titanic museum in Branson, Missouri and the one in Pigeon Forge, Tennessee. They are located outside on the buildings, each of which is modelled on the appearance of Titanic.

In the museum in Pigeon Forge there is a large touchable ice installation (15 by 28 feet; 4.6 by 8.5 metres) meant to make the coldness of an iceberg tangible. In August 2021, the ice wall collapsed onto three visitors, resulting in their hospitalization.

The Northland Discovery Boat Tours offer boat tours off the coast of Newfoundland. When his boat approaches an iceberg, boatman Paul Alcock plays the theme music from the 1997 Titanic movie. Some tourists laugh about it, others are moved. The icebergs are the most important reason for someone to go on his tour, he says. Lorraine McGrath from the tourism promotion board of the city of St. John's in Newfoundland talks about the fascination that icebergs exert on those who see one for the first time. She is frequently asked by tourists, 'Is that the iceberg that sank Titanic?' She replies in a good-humored manner, 'No, dear. That's a different one.'
