= Alexandra Kenworthy =

American voice actress (born 1932)

Alexandra Kenworthy (born April 4, 1932) is an American voice actress. She was married to Marc Snegoff until his death in 1969. Together they had two sons: fellow voice artist Gregory Snegoff, and stuntman Tony Snegoff.

== English dubbing roles ==
- 3×3 Eyes – Pai
- Lensman – Lens
- My Neighbor Totoro – Yasuko Kusakabe (Streamline Pictures dub)
- Kiki's Delivery Service – Osono (Streamline dub)
- Ringing Bell – Chirin's Mother
- Robotech – The Regess, Azonia
- Silent Möbius – Miyuka Liqueur
- Zillion: Burning Night – Odama Elder
