= List of Power Rangers Wild Force characters =

Power Rangers Wild Force is the 2002 season of Power Rangers which sees a group of humans chosen by Princess Shayla to combat pollution-powered monsters called the Orgs.

== Main characters ==
=== Wild Force Power Rangers ===
The Wild Force Rangers are humans who were chosen by Princess Shayla to defend the fictional city of Turtle Cove from monsters called the Orgs, are based on a floating landmass called the Animarium, and utilize cell phone-like devices called Growl Phones to transform. Additionally, they wield Crystal Sabers, which allow them to summon giant robotic animals called Wildzords via corresponding Animal Crystals and combine them to form mecha called Megazords.

==== Cole Evans ====
Cole Evans is a wild man who was raised by an Amazonian tribe after his scientist parents Richard and Elizabeth Evans were killed by their colleague Viktor Adler 20 years prior to the series. Due to his upbringing, he has developed a connection to nature, the ability to communicate with wildlife, increased agility, sharpened senses, and quick-wittedness. Upon reaching adulthood, his adoptive family send him off with a picture of his parents and the Red Lion Animal Crystal, tasking him with finding his destiny. In time, he would find his way to Turtle Cove and be recruited to lead the Wild Force Rangers as their Red Ranger.

As the Red Wild Force Ranger, Cole possesses leonine ferocity; wields the Red Lion Fang tekkō-kagi, Lion Blaster, Falcon Summoner recurve bow, the Falconator crossbow, and the Animarium Armor; and commands the Red Lion, Gorilla, and Falcon Wildzords.

Cole Evans is portrayed by Ricardo Medina Jr.

==== Taylor Earhardt ====
Taylor Earhardt is a former member of the United States Air Force (USAF), the Yellow Wild Force Ranger, and Cole's predecessor as leader, having been recruited a year prior to the series. Due to her military background, she is regimental, strict, arrogant, and hardened. After Cole is appointed leader, a jealous Taylor resists his efforts to befriend her before she gradually softens and learns humility over the course of the series. Following the Rangers' final battle with the Orgs, she returns to the USAF.

As the Yellow Wild Force Ranger, Taylor possesses the ability to fly; wields the Eagle Sword, Soaring Darts, and Armadillo Puck; and commands the Eagle, Black Bear, and Polar Bear Wild Zords.

Taylor Earhardt is portrayed by Alyson Kiperman.

==== Max Cooper ====
Max Cooper is the cocky and aggressive Blue Wild Force Ranger, best friend of Danny Delgado, and the youngest member of the group. Originally training to become a professional bowler, he was recruited into the group six months prior to the series by Taylor Earhardt and Alyssa Enrilé.

As the Blue Wild Force Ranger, Max wields the dagger-like Shark Fighting Fins and the Sword of Pardolis and commands the Shark and Giraffe Wildzords.

Max Cooper is portrayed by Phillip Jeanmarie.

==== Danny Delgado ====
Daniel "Danny" Delgado is a peaceful, and shy former flower shop worker, best friend of Max Cooper, and the Black Wild Force Ranger.

As the Black Wild Force Ranger, Danny possesses enhanced strength; wields the Bison Axe and Rhino Shooter assault rifle; and commands the Bison, Rhino, and Armadillo Wildzords.

Danny Delgado is portrayed by Jack Guzman.

==== Alyssa Enrilé ====
Alyssa Enrilé is the kind and nurturing White Wild Force Ranger and student of Turtle Cove University. Years prior, she trained with her martial arts instructor father until she chose to move to Turtle Cove instead of taking over his school. Following the Rangers' final battle with the Orgs, Alyssa becomes a kindergarten teacher.

As the White Wild Force Ranger, Alyssa possesses enhanced agility; wields the Tiger Baton and Deer Clutcher; and commands the White Tiger, Elephant, and Deer Wildzords.

Alyssa Enrilé is portrayed by Jessica Rey.

==== Merrick Baliton ====
Merrick Baliton is a millennia-old ancient warrior from the lost world of Animaria. Three millennia prior to the series, Merrick sought out a cursed wolf mask to kill Master Org. Though he succeeded in both tasks, he was possessed by a Duke Org called Zen-Aku. Merrick begged his allies to kill him, but they sealed him in a stone coffin instead.

In the present, a Duke Org called Nayzor releases Zen-Aku to fight the Wild Force Rangers. However, they eventually break the curse and free Merrick, who goes on to become the silver-colored Lunar Wolf Ranger. Guilt-ridden over his actions while under Zen-Aku's control, he goes into self-imposed exile and comes to live and work at a roadhouse. Despite this, he occasionally aids the Rangers, eventually accepts their friendship, and reconciles his past with Zen-Aku as the series progresses. Following the Rangers' final battle with the Orgs, Merrick leaves with Zen-Aku to travel the world and find redemption.

As the Lunar Wolf Ranger, Merrick utilizes the Lunar Caller cellphone to transform; wields a multi-purpose weapon called the Lunar Cue, which possesses a sabre mode, sniper mode, and break mode; and commands the Wolf, Hammerhead Shark, and Alligator Wildzords, which he can combine to form the Predazord.

Merrick Baliton is portrayed by Philip Andrew.

== Recurring characters ==
=== Princess Shayla ===
Princess Shayla is the princess of the Animarium, a floating landmass that used to be part of the lost world of Animaria, and protector of the Wildzords. Following the deaths of Animus and Master Org three millennia prior to the series, she fell into hibernation until the Orgs resurface in the present. In response, she recruits five people to become the Wild Force Rangers and combat the Orgs. Once the Orgs are defeated, she takes the Rangers' powers back and goes back into hibernation until they are needed again.

Princess Shayla is portrayed by Ann Marie Crouch.

=== Animus ===
Animus is a deity-like Megazord consisting of the Black Lion, Buffalo, Condor, Sawshark, and Jaguar Wildzords and an old friend of Merrick Baliton. Three millennia prior, he fought to defend Animaria from Master Org. Despite being killed, Animus' spirit lived on. In the present, he assists the Wild Force Rangers in their efforts to free Merrick from Zen-Aku's control before they unknowingly resurrect Animus in the form of an amnesiac human boy named Kite. Upon regaining his memories, he temporarily revokes the Rangers' connection to the Wildzords to test their commitment to protecting Earth before facing Master Org, only to be killed once more. Nonetheless, the Wildzords that made up his body return to help the Rangers kill Master Org.

Animus is voiced by Charles Gideon David while Kite is portrayed by Ryan Goldstein.

=== Orgs ===
The Orgs are horned monsters and ancient enemies of the Animarium's inhabitants who seek to take over the Earth by polluting it. Two types seen throughout the series are Org spirits, who possess inanimate objects to attain two-horned physical forms, and one-horned Duke Orgs, who possess more power than and lead lesser Orgs.

==== Master Org ====
Master Org is a Duke Org and the leader of the Orgs. Three millennia prior to the series, Master Org led the Orgs against Animaria's forces, during which he killed Animus before he was killed in turn by Merrick Baliton. Decades prior to the series, a prideful scientist named Dr. Viktor Adler discovered seeds that contained Master Org's essence while on an expedition to prove Animaria's existence. Driven mad by animosity and jealousy towards his colleagues Richard and Elizabeth Evans, Adler ate the seeds, acquired Org powers, and murdered them, but failed to find their son Cole. By the present, he masquerades as Master Org to fight the Wild Force Rangers until he loses his powers and is killed by a Duke Org called Mandilok.

Sometime later, Master Org revives himself in Adler's body. With help from his herald Onikage, he subsequently kills Mandilok, kidnaps Princess Shayla, and enacts a ritual using her powers and those of several dead Duke Orgs to create an "Org Heart". After consuming it, he destroys Adler's body and revives himself as a true Org before mounting an assault on the Animarium, only to be killed once more by the Wildzords.

Master Org and Viktor Adler are portrayed by Ilia Volok.

==== Toxica ====
Toxica is a Duchess Org, sorceress, and partner of Jindrax who specializes in reviving Orgs. Amidst her battles with the Wild Force Rangers, she uses a crown belonging to a Duke Org called Nayzor to turn herself into Necronomica and receives a power boost from Master Org that transforms her into "Super Toxica", only to be defeated and reverted to normal by the Wild Force Rangers on both occasions. After being betrayed and indirectly killed by Master Org's herald Onikage, Jindrax revives her before the pair help the Rangers kill Master Org. Afterward, Toxica and Jindrax leave to travel the world and find themselves.

Toxica is portrayed by Sin Wong.

==== Jindrax ====
Jindrax is an Ibaraki-dōji-themed Duke Org, an expert in bladed weapons, partner of Toxica, and rival of Taylor Earhardt. Jindrax is also the season's source of comedy. Amidst his battles with the Wild Force Rangers, he temporarily receives a power boost from Master Org that transforms him into "Super Jindrax" before being defeated and reverted to normal by the Rangers and briefly joins forces with his brother Juggelo to form "Team Carnival". After Toxica is indirectly killed by Master Org's herald Onikage, Jindrax helps the Wild Force Rangers kill the latter before manipulating them into helping him revive Toxica. The pair later rescue Princess Shayla from Master Org before leaving to travel the world and find themselves.

Jindrax is initially voiced by Richard Cansino and later by Danny Wayne Stallcup, who also portrays his human disguise.

==== Nayzor ====
Nayzor is a nose/ear-themed Duke Org. Three millennia prior to the series, he was tasked with guarding the Dark Wildzords' Animal Crystals and the cursed Wolf Mask. Though he was killed, leading to Merrick Baliton using the items to kill Master Org, he would be corrupted by their power, turned into Zen-Aku, and imprisoned. In the present, Viktor Adler revives Nayzor, who releases Zen-Aku from his imprisonment to fight the Wild Force Rangers until they free Merrick. Nayzor attempts to seek revenge, but is killed once more by Merrick. Following this, Adler orders Toxica to revive Nayzor as "Super Nayzor", who overpowers the Rangers until they acquire the Falcon Zord and kill him with the Isis Megazord. Sometime later, Master Org uses Nayzor, among other Duke Orgs, to complete his resurrection.

Nayzor is voiced by Ken Merckx.

==== Zen-Aku ====
Zen-Aku is a werewolf-themed Duke Org who was imprisoned in a cursed wolf mask. Three millennia prior, Merrick Baliton sought out the mask to kill Master Org after the latter killed Animus. Despite succeeding, Merrick was corrupted by the mask's power and Zen-Aku's will, leading to the former's comrades sealing him in a stone coffin to prevent the monster from wreaking havoc on the world. In the present, a Duke Org called Nayzor frees Zen-Aku to fight the Wild Force Rangers, who eventually break the curse and free Merrick. Sometime later, Zen-Aku, having also been freed from the curse, resurfaces to battle Merrick in an attempt to absorb him to regain their combined power. With the Rangers' help, Merrick eventually defeats Zen-Aku, seemingly killing him. Following the Rangers' final battle with Master Org, Zen-Aku returns once more to join Merrick in traveling the world to seek redemption.

Zen-Aku is initially voiced by Dan Woren and later by Lex Lang.

==== Mandilok ====
Mandilok is a mouth-themed Duke Org who possesses an insatiable appetite for manmade objects, multiple mouths, and silverware-themed weaponry. After realizing Viktor Adler was masquerading as Master Org, Toxica and Jindrax resurrect Mandilok to kill him. Once they do so, Mandilok assumes command of the Orgs until they are eventually killed by Master Org to complete his own resurrection.

Mandilok is voiced simultaneously by Barbara Goodson and Ezra Weisz.

==== Minor Orgs ====
- Plug Org: A namesake-themed Org and partner of Turbine Org. Together, they terrorize Turtle Cove until Plug Org is killed by the Wild Force Rangers. Plug Org is voiced by Tom Wyner.
- Turbine Org: A namesake-themed Org and partner of Plug Org. Together, they terrorize Turtle Cove until they are killed by the Wild Force Rangers. Toxica enlarges Turbine Org, but he is killed once more by the Wildzords. Turbine Org is voiced by Steve Kramer.
- Barbed Wire Org: A namesake-themed Org who terrorized Turtle Cove until he is killed by the Wild Force Rangers via the Wild Force Megazord. Barbed Wire Org is voiced by David Lodge.
- Camera Org: A namesake-themed Org capable of rendering people invisible. Camera Org is killed by the Wild Force Rangers via the Wild Force Megazord. Camera Org is voiced by Michael Sorich.
- Bell Org: A church bell-themed Org who possesses a hammer that he can use on himself to generate powerful sound waves and conjure large bells to entrap opponents. Bell Org is killed by the Wild Force Rangers via the Wild Force Megazord. Bell Org is voiced by Bob Papenbrook.
- Tire Org: A namesake-themed Org who can turn into a wheel, gaining enhanced speed and agility. Tire Org is killed by the Wild Force Rangers via the Wild Force Megazord in its Sword and Shield Mode. Tire Org is voiced by Derek Stephen Prince.
- Ship Org: A namesake-themed Org who possesses superhuman strength, durable armor, a wooden shield, and use of an anchor. Aggressive and independent, he attacks the Wild Force Rangers and his fellow Orgs alike until he is killed by the former via the Wild Force Megazord in its Spear Mode. Ship Org is voiced by Mike Reynolds.
- Cell Phone Org: A namesake-themed Org who can generate a jamming field capable of negating the Wild Force Rangers' transformation capabilities. He is killed by the Wild Force Rangers via the Wild Force Megazord Double Knuckle. Cell Phone Org is voiced by William Holmes.
- Bulldozer Org: A namesake-themed Org who possesses superhuman strength. He initially wanders aimlessly until Toxica and Jindrax recruit him to kill the Wild Force Rangers, who eventually kill Bulldozer Org via the Kongazord. Bulldozer Org is voiced by Jason Faunt.
- Retinax: An eye-themed Duke Org and Master Org's bodyguard. Following the latter's death three millennia prior to the series, an ashamed Retinax roamed the Earth until Toxica and Jindrax find him in the present and inform him of Master Org's apparent return. Seeking to redeem himself, Retinax attempts to kill the Wild Force Rangers, only to be defeated by them and killed by Viktor Adler. Sometime later, Master Org resurrects Retinax, among other Duke Orgs, to complete his resurrection. Retinax is voiced by Michael Sorich.
- Freezer Org: A refrigerator-themed Org who can produce freezing gusts from his face. He commits suicide to cripple the Wildzords. Freezer Org is voiced by Billy Forester.
- Vacuum Cleaner Org: A namesake-themed Org capable of pulling objects towards him. He is killed by the Wild Force Rangers via the Wild Force Megazord in its Sword and Shield Mode. Vacuum Cleaner Org is voiced by Dave Mallow.
- Bus Org: A namesake-themed Org capable of transforming into a bus. He is killed by the Wild Force Rangers via the Wild Force Megazord. Bus Org is voiced by David Leisure.
- Motorcycle Org: A namesake-themed Org who previously fought Taylor Earhardt as Scooter Org until Princess Shayla sealed him a year prior to the series. During this time, he evolved into his current form before Zen-Aku frees him in the present to fight the Wild Force Rangers, who eventually kill the former. Scooter and Motorcycle Org are both voiced by Kirk Thornton.
- Lawnmower Org: A namesake-themed Org who possesses arm blades and a mower-like lower body. He is killed by Zen-Aku for interfering in the latter's fight with the Wild Force Rangers. Lawnmower Org is voiced by Kim Strauss.
- Quadra Org: A powerful chimeric Org that Master Org created from the Elephant, Giraffe, Black Bear, and Polar Bear Wildzords' Animal Crystals that possesses elephant trunk-like tentacles and lightning, fire, and ice-based attacks. Quadra Org battles the Wild Force Rangers until they kill him via the Wild Force Megazord Striker and the Predazord and recover the Animal Crystals. Quadra Org is voiced by Frank Adelia.
- Karaoke Org: A namesake-themed Org who can perform singing and music-based attacks and can fire CDs. He is killed by the Wild Force Rangers via the Wild Force Megazord Striker and the Predazord. Karaoke Org is voiced by Monica Louwerens.
- Signal Org: A traffic light-themed Org who possesses three eyes, each capable of inducing amnesia, producing energy blasts, and slowing down targets. He is killed by the Wild Force Rangers via the Wild Force Megazord in its Spear Mode. Signal Org is voiced by Tony Oliver.
- Bowling Org: A bowling ball-themed Org who can perform bowling-based attacks. He is killed by the Wild Force Rangers via the Wild Force Megazord in its Predator Mode. Bowling Org is voiced by Richard Epcar.
- Wedding Dress Org: A namesake-themed Org. She kidnaps brides to turn them into mannequins until she is killed by the Wild Force Rangers via the Wild Force Megazord in its Sword and Shield Mode. Wedding Dress Org is voiced by Peggy O'Neal.
- Samurai Org: A namesake-themed Org who possesses skill in martial arts. He is killed by the Wild Force Rangers via the Tiger Wildzord and the Kongazord. Samurai Org is voiced by Tom Wyner.
- Tombstone Org: A namesake-themed Org that Master Org created from Dr. Viktor Adler's gravestone and the spirits of several dead Orgs. Tombstone Org is killed by the Wild Force Rangers via the Wild Force Megazord in its Clutcher Mode. Tombstone Org is voiced by Stephen Apostolina.
- Mut-Orgs: Three multi-horned "Mutant Orgs" from the 31st century and the remaining members of their race who became trapped in statue-like forms. They primarily spoke in reverse English. After convincing Ransik to free them by letting them copy his mutant powers in exchange for empowering him, they traveled back in time to the present to reunite with Master Org. However, the Time Force Rangers and a reformed Ransik pursue them and join forces with the Wild Force Rangers to thwart them. Once Ransik purges the Mut-Orgs of their mutant DNA, the two teams eventually kill the monsters.
  - Rofang: The leader of the Mut-Orgs. Rofang is voiced by Kim Strauss.
  - Takach: A member of the Mut-Orgs. Takach is voiced by David Lodge.
  - Kired: A member of the Mut-Orgs. Kired is voiced by David Lodge.
- Artilla: A tank-themed Duke Org. After being freed by Mandilok, he and Helicos wreak havoc on Turtle Cove until they are killed by the Wild Force Rangers via the Isis Megazord. Artilla is voiced by Michael Sorich.
- Helicos: A helicopter-themed Duke Org. After being freed by Mandilok, he and Artilla wreak havoc on Turtle Cove until they are killed by the Wild Force Rangers via the Isis Megazord. Helicos is voiced by Dave Mallow.
- Flute Org: A namesake-themed Org who was initially capable of hypnotizing children until Mandilok uses Toxica and Jindrax's energy to enhance him so he can disrupt Princess Shayla and Merrick's efforts to calm the Deer Wildzord until Flute Org is weakened by Animus and killed by the Wild Force Rangers via the Isis Megazord. Flute Org is voiced by Monica Louwerens.
- Juggelo: A juggling-themed Duke Org and Jindrax's brother. Together, they form "Team Carnival" and attack the Wild Force Rangers, who eventually kill Juggelo via the Wild Force Megazord. Juggelo is voiced by Patrick Thomas.
- Lion Tamer Org: A namesake-themed Org who possesses a whip that allows him to control living organisms, such as the Wildzords. He is killed by the Wild Force Rangers via the Isis Megazord. Lion Tamer Org is voiced by Tom Wyner.
- Monitor Org: A video monitor-themed Org who can transport people to other locations via his namesakes. He is killed by the Wild Force Rangers via the Wild Force Megazord. Monitor Org is voiced by Kerrigan Mahan.
- Toy Org: A toy robot-themed Org who can produce fire from his hands and wields toy-themed weapons. He is killed by Animus and Merrick Baliton via the Predazord Blue Moon. Toy Org is voiced by Steve McGowan.
- Onikage: A ninja-themed Duke Org and herald of Master Org who possesses illusionary powers. In preparation for Master Org's return, he surfaces to seemingly aid Mandilok against the Wild Force Rangers while secretly kidnapping Princess Shayla and arranging for Mandilok and Toxica's deaths. However, Jindrax intervenes in the Rangers' favor before they eventually kill Onikage via the Pegasus Megazord. Onikage is voiced by Dan Woren.
- Locomotive Org: A namesake-themed Org who possesses superhuman strength, durable armor, and a furnace-like mouth that can produce fire. He overpowers the Wild Force Rangers until Jindrax helps them kill him. He subsequently enlarges Locomotive Org to cover his escape so he can use their powers to resurrect Toxica. Following a failed attempt to kill him, Locomotive Org overpowers the Rangers and the Wildzords until they eventually form the Isis Megazord Predator Mode and kill him. Locomotive Org is voiced by Michael Sorich.

== Guest characters ==
- Kendall: A flower shop worker and Danny Delgado's former coworker. Kendall is portrayed by Sandra McCoy.
- Richard and Elizabeth Evans: Cole's scientist parents and colleagues of Viktor Adler. While on an expedition in the Amazon to prove Animaria's existence, Richard and Elizabeth were killed by Adler, who was in love with her and was furious that she married Richard over him. Before she died, Elizabeth hid an infant Cole, who would go on to avenge them as an adult. Richard and Elizabeth Evans are portrayed by Jack Maxwell and Ana Bianco, respectively.
- Willie: The owner of a roadhouse who becomes acquainted with Merrick Baliton. Willie is portrayed by J. D. Hall.
- Don: A pro bowler and Max Cooper's bowling mentor. Don is portrayed by Eddie Mekka.
- Mr. Enrilé: Alyssa Enrilé's father and a martial arts instructor. Mr. Enrilé is portrayed by Branscombe Richmond.
- Time Force Rangers: A group consisting of four Time Force law enforcement officers from 3001 and two members of the contemporary Silver Guardians private security team. Upon learning of the Mut-Orgs' existence, they reunite and join forces with the Wild Force Rangers to defeat them.
  - Wes Collins: The co-leader of the Silver Guardians who operates as the Red Time Force Ranger. In a later appearance, he and Eric Myers join forces with Cole Evans and seven other Red Rangers to defeat the Machine Empire. Wes Collins is portrayed by Jason Faunt.
  - Lucas Kendall: A Time Force officer who operates as the Blue Time Force Ranger. Lucas Kendall is portrayed by Michael Copon.
  - Trip: A Time Force officer who operates as the Green Time Force Ranger. Trip is portrayed by Kevin Kleinberg.
  - Katie Walker: A Time Force officer who operates as the Yellow Time Force Ranger. Katie Walker is portrayed by Deborah Estelle Philips.
  - Jen Scotts: A Time Force officer who operates as the Pink Time Force Ranger. Jen Scotts is portrayed by Erin Cahill.
  - Eric Myers: The co-leader of the Silver Guardians who operates as the Quantum Ranger. In a later appearance, he and Wes Collins join forces with Cole Evans and seven other Red Rangers to defeat the Machine Empire. Eric Meyers is portrayed by Daniel Southworth.
- Nadira: A reformed mutant criminal and daughter of Ransik who previously fought the Time Force Rangers until she eventually saw the error of her ways and turned herself in. The Time Force Rangers recruit her to help them defeat the Mut-Orgs. Nadira is portrayed by Kate Sheldon.
- Ransik: A reformed mutant criminal who empowered the Mut-Orgs and previously fought the Time Force Rangers until he eventually saw the error of his ways and turned himself in. The Time Force Rangers recruit him to help them defeat the Mut-Orgs. Amidst the battle, he purges them and himself of their shared mutant DNA, rendering himself human in the process. Ransik is portrayed by Vernon Wells.
- Circuit: A robotic owl and ally of the Time Force Rangers. Circuit is voiced by Brianne Siddall.
- Machine Empire: A faction of alien androids who seek revenge on the Power Rangers for defeating their leader, King Mondo. In pursuit of their quest, they establish a base on the moon and work to restore Lord Zedd's dragon mecha Serpentera, only to be defeated and destroyed by 10 Red Rangers.
  - General Venjix: The leader of the Machine Empire faction who is destroyed by Cole Evans. General Venjix is voiced by Archie Kao.
  - Tezzla: A female member who is destroyed by Eric Myers and Aurico. Tezzla is voiced by Catherine Sutherland.
  - Gerrok: A general who is destroyed by Tommy Oliver and Wes Collins. Gerrok is voiced by Walter Emanuel Jones.
  - Steelon: A general who is destroyed by Andros and Carter Grayson. Steelon is voiced by an uncredited Scott Page-Pagter.
  - Automon: A general who is destroyed by T.J. Johnson and Leo Corbett. Automon is voiced by an uncredited David Walsh.
- Andros: An alien from the planet KO-35 who operates as the Red Space Ranger. Andros is portrayed by Christopher Khayman Lee.
- Bulk and Skull: A pair of best friends from Angel Grove who became servers at Club Bulkmeier. Bulk and Skull are portrayed by Paul Schrier and Jason Narvy, respectively.
- Tommy Oliver: A veteran Ranger who previously operated as the original Green and White Mighty Morphin Ranger and the Red Zeo and Turbo Ranger before retiring and passing the latter mantle to T.J. Johnson. In response to the Machine Empire resurfacing, Oliver reassumes his Zeo powers and joins forces with nine other Red Rangers to defeat them. Tommy Oliver is portrayed by Jason David Frank. (Note: Credited as "Jason Frank".)
- Carter Grayson: A firefighter and civil servant who operates as the Red Lightspeed Ranger. Carter Grayson is portrayed by Sean Cw Johnson.
- T.J. Johnson: A veteran Ranger who succeeded Tommy Oliver as the Red Turbo Ranger and later became the Blue Space Ranger. In response to the Machine Empire resurfacing, he reassumes his Turbo powers and joins forces with nine other Red Rangers to defeat them. T.J. Johnson is portrayed by Selwyn Ward.
- Jason Lee Scott: A veteran Ranger who previously operated as the original Red Mighty Morphin Ranger and Gold Zeo Ranger before retiring. In response to the Machine Empire resurfacing, he reassumes his original powers and joins forces with nine other Red Rangers to defeat them. Jason Lee Scott is portrayed by Austin St. John.
- Alpha 7: A robot and successor to Alpha 5 and Alpha 6 who assists Tommy Oliver and Andros in their efforts to defeat the Machine Empire. Alpha 7 is voiced by Richard Steven Horvitz.
- Leo Corbett: An inhabitant of the space colony Terra Venture, later the alien planet Mirinoi, who previously operated as the Red Galaxy Ranger. In response to the Machine Empire resurfacing, he reassumes his powers and joins forces with nine other Red Rangers to defeat them. Leo Corbett is portrayed by Danny Slavin.
- Aurico: An alien from the planet Aquitar who operates as the Red Aquitar Ranger. Aurico is voiced by Christopher Glenn.
