= List of Masked Rider monsters =

In Masked Rider, Count Dregon has monsters called Insectovores which he uses in his plots. They are kept in jars which come to life when they are launched from the Spiderbase.

== Monster List ==
Here is a list of monsters used by Count Dregon and his minions:

=== Destructosphere ===
- First Appearance: "Escape from Edenoi" Pt. 1 (9/16/95)
- Voice Actor: Rudy Luzion

A grotesque grasshopper humanoid with the ability to change into a ball or a spike. Destructosphere was the first monster sent after Dex, when he arrived on Earth. Prior to the attack, Destructosphere was a sphere dropped to Earth by Count Dregon, in a scrapyard where he absorbed some junk to create his body. He proved very strong, but was defeated by Dex and his Rider Kick attack. (Note: Destructosphere was, unlike most Masked Rider monsters, taken from the movie Kamen Rider ZO instead of the show Kamen Rider Black RX where he counterpart is Doras.)

=== Beetletron ===
- First Appearance: "Escape from Edenoi" Pt. 2 (9/16/95)
- Voice Actor: Richard George

A large robot with hand-mounted cannons and tank treads instead of legs and feet. He spoke in a robotic monotone. His mission was to eliminate Combat Chopper and Magno so Dex could be outnumbered by Dregon's forces. He can attack with the guns on his body called Beetle Blasters. Combat Chopper tried to attack it and failed. He had Dex in a pinch until Magno rammed him and later knocked him on his side. He was the first to be destroyed by Dex's energy sword the Electro Saber.

=== Larvatron ===
- First Appearance: "License to Thrill" (9/23/95)
- Voice Actor: Billy Matsuda

A robotic Insectovore that impersonated Dex's driving instructor Mr. Li (portrayed by Billy Matsuda too). He can attack with his laser cannon arm and shoot a red beam from the red part of his head. Passing off as Mr. Li, Larvatron tried to run Dex over, but Dex held onto the car until he found a safe place to let go. After Larvatron dropped his disguise, Dex became Masked Rider and severed the robot's head with the Rider Kick. However, Larvatron had a backup head: a powerful four-way cannon. He fired the cannons on Dex, who then enlisted the aid of Combat Chopper. While on Combat Chopper, Dex managed to destroy him with his Electro Saber.

=== Mandible ===
- First Appearance: "Pet Nappers" (9/30/95)
- Voice Actor: Gardner Baldwin

A cactus-like monster with jaw-like pincers who assisted Nefaria and Gork in Count Dregon's plan to capture Ferbus and steal the Masked Rider powers. It can emit a vine from its mouth and launch its jaw-like pincers. Once Dex rescued Ferbus, he engaged Mandible and Gork in battle. When he got caught on Mandible's vine, he called for Combat Chopper and broke free from his vine. While riding on Combat Chopper, Dex destroyed Mandible with his Electro Saber. Fits the category of Gork's monsters.

=== Mothitron ===
- First Appearance: "Bugs on the Loose" (10/7/95)
- Voice Actor: Glen McDougal

A three-eyed green moth monster who has the ability to use moths to turn humans into Insectovores. He can also shoot lasers from his eye and wrap anyone in his long tongue. Count Dregon had Nefaria send the Maggots to lure Hal and Albee towards Mothitron during their bug hunt. Once that plan worked, Mothitron used his moths to infect the two of them. Slowly, Hal and Albee, who were immobilized by the attack, took on the characteristics of an Insectovore (claws, green skin, bug eyes, etc.). Ferbus, though, was able to escape and warn Dex. Using a butterfly Ferbus had caught, Dex created an antidote. As Masked Rider, Dex took Magno and the antidote to Hal and Albee's location, but then he was ambushed by Mothitron. During the battle, Magno tackled Mothitron and took Masked Rider to the cave. Once inside, while looking for Hal and Albee, Dex was attacked by Mothitron again. Dex chopped off Mothitron's tongue, but Mothitron still overwhelmed Dex. Magno tunneled into the cave to save Dex. Magno tackled Mothitron before Dex destroyed him with the Electro Saber and used the antidote to restore Hal and Albee.

=== Crimson Creeper ===
- First Appearance: "Arcade Ace" (10/14/95)
- Voice Actor: Steve Cassling

A black-haired crustacean monster with a strong-clawed right arm. He also has a toxic breath attack. While Dex was helping Albee train to beat the arcade ace Henry Wall, Count Dregon sent Crimson Creeper down with Double Face to capture Dex in order to steal the Masked Rider powers. Dex fought both of them in the first battle and called upon Combat Chopper for help. During a challenge against Henry Wall, Combat Chopper alerted Dex that Magno detected the Crimson Creeper attacking an amusement park. Dex chopped off Crimson Creeper's arm before he used his toxic breath on him. Dex counter-attacked with the Rider Kick before destroying Crimson Creeper with the Electro Saber.

=== Robo Rider ===
- First Appearance: "Super Gold" Pt. 1 (10/28/95)
- Actor: Winston Story

Dex's friend Donais was sent to Earth to give him the Super Gold upgrade. However, Donais was captured by the Maggots and taken to the Spiderbase, where he was then brainwashed into becoming Dregon's loyal servant. Dregon had been working on an artificial Masked Rider power, but it was too dangerous to test on himself, so he used it on Donais to turn him into Robo Rider. Robo Rider was silver and black with green eyes. He also held two swords in battle. Robo Rider attacked the school causing Dex to transform and fight him. Robo Rider retreated and confronted Count Dregon on why he sent Edentada down to Earth. After attacking Gork, Count Dregon instructed Robo Rider to keep the Edentada in its cave...which Robo Rider does. After Masked Rider escapes the cave that Edentada was in, Robo Rider attacked as Masked Rider warns him that Edentada is starting to make the area destabilized. In order to defeat Robo Rider, Masked Rider used the Rider Kick on him. Dex was then able to defeat Robo Rider by slashing him with the Electro Saber thus breaking the spell over Donais and returning him back to normal. (Note: His counterpart from Kamen Rider Black RX is Century King Shadow Moon.)

=== Edentada ===
- First Appearance: "Super Gold" Pt. 2 (11/4/95)
- Voice Actor: Bob Papenbrook

A savage elephant-like creature with crab-like claws. Edentada is a creature that feasted on Edenoites and acquired their powers. The Edentada was a fierce digger. Count Dregon had absolutely no control over the creature. Under Gork's suggestion, he launched it during Masked Rider's fight with Robo Rider. Robo Rider was instructed to keep Edentada in its cave. During the confrontation, Robo Rider forced it back in the cave. It starts to cause earthquakes when it starts to get hungry for Masked Rider causing Count Dregon to send Nefaria to stop its hunger strike. Masked Rider finds the cave that Edentada is in and fights it before Nefaria arrives with Cyclopter, Double Face, and Gork to bring Edentada back. However, Edentada attacked them which caused some magma to be released. As Masked Rider headed to the surface, Edentada started digging fast causing the entire area to become destabilized. After defeating Robo Rider and obtaining the Super Gold powers, Dex transformed into Masked Rider and then transforms into his Super Gold form to fight Edentada. Dex discovers that Edentada has planted a bomb. After disarming the bomb, Dex had Combat Chopper tackle Edentada. Dex then used his Ecto-Ray blaster to destroy Edentada.

=== Termasect ===
- First Appearance: "The Grandma Factor" (11/11/95)
- Voice Actor: John C. Hyke

A blue robotic scorpion-like monster who can shoot lasers from his eyes and fingers. After the Maggots mistakenly capture the Stewarts' grandmother instead of Molly and Albee, Grandma Stewart mistook the case that Termasect was in for trash and discarded it down the launch tube (which she thought was a garbage disposal) sending it down to Earth. Cycloptor said that it would be out of control, but Count Dregon says that he'll see how Termasect does with Masked Rider. Dex as the Masked Rider found Termasect and confronted him. After an attack from Termasect, Dex changed into his Super Gold form and summoned Combat Chopper (who was then transformed into Super Chopper). Dex sliced off Termasect's right hand while on Super Chopper (who blasted bullets from its exhausts) and then destroyed him with his Ecto-Ray.

=== Slimeasect ===
- First Appearance: "The Grandma Factor" (11/11/95)
- Voice Actor: Ross Bolen

A slithering grayish-white blob-like monster with tentacles for arms and a giant mouth in his midsection. Outside of his ability to turn into fast-moving slime and shoot steam from his mouth, he was known to eat anything. In order to kidnap Molly and Albee, Count Dregon launched the Slimeasect to help the Maggots. Unfortunately, the Maggots mistakenly kidnapped the Stewarts' grandmother. Following Termasect's destruction, Count Dregon had Nefaria place Grandma Stewart (who accidentally got petrified) near Slimeasect as bait. Dex arrived at the scene as Masked Rider and battled Slimeasect. When Slimeasect started to eat him, Dex called Magno whom Slimeasect moved out of the way of. After Dex destroyed Slimeasect with the Electro Saber, he restored his family's grandmother.

=== Recyclotron ===
- First Appearance: "Something's Trashy" (11/18/95)
- Voice Actor: Sparky Thornton

During a clean-up campaign in Leawood, Cyclopter's Reanimator Ray revived a fallen robot called Cyclotron. When upgraded to the mummy-like Recyclotron, his head was modified with a cooling helmet that kept the monster from overheating (which was the one flaw that led to his destruction in an earlier fight with Masked Rider). In addition to interchangeable arms, leg cannons, and metallic wrappings emitted from a compartment in his torso, he also had the power to control any electrical appliance. Using two cars, he seemingly killed Masked Rider with a missile launched from his right leg cannon. Recyclotron then attacked Leawood with reanimated appliances. Hal took it upon himself to go after Recyclotron with a Catho-Destabilizer weapon he invented. Unfortunately for Hal, Recyclotron took control of the Catho-Destabilizer until Masked Rider arrived. After a fierce fight, Dex managed to kick off his cooling helmet and knock him down with the Rider Kick. Dex then destroyed Recyclotron with the Electro Saber.

=== Fire Bug ===
- First Appearance: "Water Water Everywhere" (11/25/95)
- Voice Actor: Paul Schrier

A robotic monster that can manipulate fire. Double Face and Fact had created a chemical that when mixed with water will form a toxic mist that takes over the minds of whoever breathes it. In the event that Dex traces the toxic mist to the factory, Double Face prepared Fire Bug to fight him. When the Stewarts were at the community pool for the day, everyone but Dex got affected. Dex transformed into Masked Rider and used Magno to trace the mist back to the source. Dex engaged Fire Bug at the factory. Fire Bug dragged Dex into a room where it started a fire. Dex transformed into his Super Gold form making him immune to the heat. After breaking out of the room, Dex destroyed Fire Bug with his Ecto-Ray and stopped the gas flow.

=== Hydrasect/Arachnida ===
- First Appearance: "Stranger from the North" (1/27/96)
- Actor: Balinda English (Hydrasect, U.S. Footage)
- Voice Actor: Andrea Harmon

Hydrasect is a colorful female bee-like monster with wings on her head. Hydrasect had the ability to fly with her wings and shoot needles from her hands. When Nefaria told Count Dregon that they need an Insectivore that is cunning, Count Dregon considered using a shapeshifter called Hydrasect. When launched from the Spiderbase, Nefaria, the Maggots and later some Commandoids accompanied Hydrasect to monitor the progress. The Commandoids mistook a Scandislavian exchange student named Bjorgy as Dex (due to him wearing one of Dex's Jackets) and took him to the quarry where Hydrasect was waiting. Upon learning this, Dex transformed and went after them. When Bjorgy encountered Hydrasect, she thought he was Dex until he arrived. While Bjorgy hid, Dex engaged Hydrasect and managed to knock out her out of the sky for a short time. Upon throwing Dex into her chamber, Hydrasect shapeshifted into an even more powerful form known as Arachnida: a large 4-legged inhuman female drider who had a set of spider legs on her back and two spider legs for a left arm. Arachnida could shoot strong webbing to entangle Masked Rider. The monster was unlike any Dex ever encountered. During combat with Arachnida, he learned that her spider legs were hollow. By snapping one, it instantly killed her. (Note: Hydrasect is one of only two monsters to appear in U.S. footage, the other being Robo Rider. Her counterpart from Kamen Rider J is Zu while Arachnida's counterpart from Kamen Rider ZO is Kumo Woman who was the first monster to be claymated.)

=== Robosect ===
- First Appearance: "Dance Crazy" (2/3/96)
- Voice Actor: Scott Page-Pagter

A robotic insectoid monster. He wields a laser pistol, has powerful punches, can detach the blades on his back to use as weapons (and throw them as if they were boomerangs), and can shoot a beam from his forehead. Robosect was dispatched to capture Dex when he was preparing for a dance contest. He was modified with a Red Fusion Bomb that will activate the Spiderbase's tractor beam that will bring Robosect and Dex up to the Spiderbase. Dex encounters Robosect outside of Leawood High School and transforms into Masked Rider. During the fight, Dex ends up hitting the Red Fusion Beam and ends up in the Spiderbase's tractor beam with Robosect. Dex broke free from Robosect's grasp only to be blasted from the tractor beam by Robosect. After being located by Ferbus, Magno, and Combat Chopper, Dex is informed by Magno that Robosect is detected in the sub-basement of Leawood's Ancient History Museum. Dex ends up fighting Robosect in the museum's sub-basement and gets overwhelmed. Dex transforms into his Super Gold form and knocks Robosect down. After trying to get Robosect to surrender, Dex uses his Ecto-Ray to destroy Robosect.

=== The Skull Reapers ===
- First Appearance: "The Green-Eyed Monster" (2/10/96)
- Voice Actors: Mike Reynolds (Skull Reaper #1), Scott Page-Pagter (Skull Reaper #2), Brad Orchard (Skull Reaper #3)

Three Grim Reaper-based monsters. The leader had two long horns coming out from its hood while the other two didn't. The leader could also blast an electric forcefield from his scythe to bind Dex in battle. In Count Dregon's latest attempt to steal the Masked Rider powers, Double Face stumbled upon an idea to use a tractor beam to bring Dex up to the Spiderbase. To help out, Count Dregon has Nefaria have the Skull Reapers "escort" Dex into the tractor beam. When Ferbus is left behind at the motocross park, Dex heads there to save him only to be ambushed by the Skull Reapers. This tactic works as Dex ends up a prisoner of Count Dregon. Upon learning of Dex's capture, Magno and Combat Chopper emit some energy to overload the Spiderbase enough for Dex to escape. Count Dregon orders his minions to send the Skull Reapers down to help recapture Dex. As the Skull Reapers show up on their motorcycles, Dex transforms and fights them on board Combat Chopper. After knocking the Skull Reapers off their motorcycles, Dex is bound by the lead Skull Reaper's attack. Magno discovers that the Skull Reapers can't stand water and tells this to Dex. Dex manages to trick them into following him into the pond which resulted in their disintegration. In "The Heat is On," two Skull Reapers helped Heliotoid fight Dex until they were knocked down by Magno.

=== Heliotoid ===
- First Appearance: "The Heat is On" (2/17/96)
- Voice Actor: Ed Neal

A robotic insectoid monster whose heat manipulation abilities caused an immense heat wave which caused Ferbus to fall ill. Heliotoid does this by getting its energy from the sun in which Count Dregon hopes that Heliotoid will become strong enough to destroy Masked Rider. To counteract with Count Dregon's plot, Hal started inventing the Quantum Cooler to help make things cooler. To keep it from being complete and thwarting Heliotoid, Nefaria and the Maggots were sent to make sure it isn't completed which doesn't go well for the Maggots. When Heliotoid has gathered enough energy, Count Dregon has Nefaria send Heliotoid to attack. Dex detected Heliotoid attacking the power plant and transforms. Upon fighting him and two Skull Reapers, Dex fought them alongside Magno and Combat Chopper. Upon fighting Heliotoid, Dex transformed into his Super Gold form where Heliotoid's solar attacks wouldn't work on him. Heliotoid locked his arms around Masked Rider so that the sun could weaken him. Masked Rider broke free and destroy Heliotoid with his Ecto-Ray.

=== Electrosect ===
- First Appearance: "Know Your Neighbor" (2/24/96)
- Voice Actor: Steve Cassling

A black and white robot with the ability to harness electricity. He had two long bowed horns on his head and a sword, all of which served as lightning rods. Count Dregon was furious to see the Stewarts on a televised game show called "Know Your Neighbor" against the Carbunkle family. For that, he had the Maggots lure Dex to Cycloptor so that he can take him on in battle. After the first fight, Count Dregon sent Electrosect down to assist Cycloptor. During the second fight, Dex fought Cycloptor and Electrosect. While Cycloptor retreated, Electrosect started to drain Dex of his powers. Dex transformed into his Super Gold form and broke off Electrosect's left horn. Dex then used the Ecto-Ray to destroy Electrosect.

=== Tentaclon ===
- First Appearance: "The Dash" (2/24/96)
- Voice Actor: Mike Reynolds

A squid/jellyfish-like monster with many offense-capable tentacles and a teleportation ability. When Count Dregon notices Dex using his powers to race to school, Double Face comes up with a plan which involved a Mass-Molecular Transfer Machine that they claimed from one of the planets Count Dregon conquered as well as a powerful crystal. To assist in a plot to capture the population of Leawood and enslave them on Edenoi, Count Dregon unleashed Tentaclon to hide the machine from Dex until it was ready. When Dex detected the activity, he arrived only to be ambushed by the Maggots unleashed by Tentaclon. After the Maggots were defeated, Tentaclon attacked. After a brief fight, Tentaclon disappeared alongside the Maggots, the Commandoids, and the Mass-Molecular Transfer Machine. When the crystal was charged up, Tentaclon had the Commandoids install the crystal into the Mass-Molecular Transfer Machine. When the test run is complete, it is sensed by Dex who manages to slip away. Dex ended up fighting Tentaclon again who kept teleporting in battle. When Tentaclon gets Dex in his tentacles, Combat Chopper saves Dex. When Tentaclon disappears again, Combat Chopper managed to detect him. Upon learning this, Dex dodged Tentaclon and used the Rider Kick on Tentaclon. Once Tentaclon was destroyed by the Electro Saber, the Mass-Molecular Transfer Machine was destroyed.

=== Blue-Fanged Louse ===
- First Appearance: "Battle of the Bands" (4/27/96)
- Voice Actor: Ross Bolen

A caterpillar-like monster that can drain energy from any machinery with its mouth-like hands and occasion discharge them as an attack. When Count Dregon learned that Dex was participating in a band contest at the Cosmos Arcade, Count Dregon had Gork unleash the Blue-Fanged Louse to drain the power out of various objects. Dex detected Blue-Fanged Louse at the power plant and became Masked Rider to fight him. Dex managed to get overwhelmed by Blue-Fanged Louse even when Dex's Rider Kick energy is absorbed. When it absorbed the Masked Rider powers upon Gork's arrival, it was too much for the Blue-Fanged Louse enough to regress it to the size of a louse. This enabled Dex to get away on Magno. Upon hearing a suggestion from Gork, Dregon sent Blue-Fanged Louse and three Commandoids incognito as a band named "Battle Cry" at the Battle of the Bands contest. Battle Cry's music was causing immense tremors around the arcade. Dex discovered their true forms and cut the power enough for Blue-Fanged Louse and the Commandoids to escape. When Dex catches up to them, Blue-Fanged Louse assumes his true form and ends up attacking the city as it absorbs the energy attacks from the Spiderbase. Dex transforms and fights Blue-Fanged Louse. Upon discovering a flaw in Blue-Fanged Louse's ability, Dex then used a combination of the Rider Kick and the Electro Saber to cut off Blue-Fanged Louse's left arm before finishing him off with the Electro Saber.

=== Cyborsect ===
- First Appearance: "Ferbus Maximus" (5/4/96)
- Voice Actor: Lex Lang

A gray demon-like robot monster whom Dregon called his favorite monster. He could launch his fist like a powerful missile in battle. Following a battle between Dex and Cycloptor on his Cannon Wheels motorcycle, Count Dregon decides to have Cyborsect assist Cycloptor in the next battle. As a diversion, Nefaria disguises the root of the Ball Tree of Edenoi (which has some side effects on Ferbus' kind) as a cupcake to deal with Ferbus. While the Stewarts try to coral Ferbus even when he grows, Dex and Combat Chopper end up fighting Cycloptor on his upgraded Cannon Wheels. When Dex is on the defensive, Count Dregon sends Cyborsect to assist Cycloptor. The attacks of Cyborsect and Cycloptor's Cannon Wheels was enough to knock Dex off of Combat Chopper. Dex called on Magno to get him and Combat Chopper away from Cycloptor and Cyborsect. Upon finding out that Ferbus has grown large, Dex sends Magno and Combat Chopper after Ferbus while Dex confronted Cycloptor and Cyborsect. Dex then transformed into Super Gold and quickly destroyed Cyborsect with his Ecto-Ray before doing the same to Cannon Wheels.

=== Tripron ===
- First Appearance: "Unmasked Rider" (6/15/96)
- Voice Actor: Lemoine Stutler

A red robotic crab monster that originally appeared as its three components: Tripron Units 1-3. Tripron Unit 1 can shoot an energy beam from its antennae. Together, they can become a united version of Tripron who can attack with the circle on its head. When Nefaria finds out that Patsy is a distraction to Dex, she plans to use this and persuades Count Dregon to let her use Tripron: the first of the new mutant strain. Count Dregon launches Tripron down to Earth. Meanwhile, Donais comes back to Earth to give Dex the Super Blue upgrade. While Donais works on the upgrade, Dex traces Tripron's signal and ends up attacked by the Tripron Units. After Donais arrived upon completing the upgrade, Dex transforms only to be captured by Nefaria. She and Tripron trapped Dex in a room with spikes on the walls that are closing in on him. Using his Super Blue powers to get out through the dripping water on the ceiling, Dex ends up taking down the Commandoids as Nefaria unleashes Tripron who combine to attack Dex. Dex calls for Combat Chopper (who was then transformed into Ultra Chopper). After ramming Tripron, Dex defeated Tripron with his new power sword the Blue Saber attack.

=== Turtletron ===
- First Appearance: "Ferbus' Day Out" (6/22/96)
- Voice Actor: R. Martin Klein

A tortoise monster. He can bite, launch its neck and head out to constrict, and shoot sparks out of his mouth. Turtletron went down to battle Dex on Earth alongside Double Face. Double Face wanted to test his new "Super Sword" and Dregon wanted to make sure Double Face would succeed. When Dex was at a restaurant with his family, he gets a private visit from Combat Chopper who had detected Turtletron by the river. Dex transforms and attacks Turtletron. After a Rider Kick on Turtletron, Double Face arrived to assist causing Dex to retreat. During the second fight, Dex transformed into his Super Blue form and fought Double Face and Turtletron. When Dex's leg was being bitten by Turtletron, he turned into water to escape. Dex then brought out his Blue Saber to disarm Double Face. Double Face retreated ordering Turtletron to finish off Dex. When Turtletron launches his head and neck out to attack, Masked Rider used his Blue Saber to destroy it before using it to finish off Turtletron.

=== Liquisect ===
- First Appearance: "Jobless" (6/29/96)
- Voice Actor: Brad Orchard

A slug-like monster that could liquefy himself and shapeshift into a shadow-like form. Upon reviewing Dex's second forms, Count Dregon wonders why he doesn't have an Insectivore that can liquify. Cycloptor reminds him that they have Liquisect and plan the right time to use him. When they learn that Dex has gotten a job at the Cosmos Arcade, Count Dregon decides to take the opportunity to use Liquisect by having him disguised as a grape soda which is planted at the Cosmos Arcade. When it spills, Dex follows Liquisect's liquified form to the boat yard. Dex transforms into Masked Rider and manages to knock him down with the Rider Kick. Liquisect shapeshifts into a shadow and ambushes Dex. After Dex broke free, Liquisect escaped after being knocked down by Magno. To lure Dex into a trap, Count Dregon sent the Maggots to capture Hal and Ferbus and place them in a warehouse where Gork has placed a bomb. When Dex locates the warehouse where Hal and Ferbus are tied up in, Liquisect ambushes Dex who then transforms. When Liquisect transforms into his shadow form, Dex uses his Ecto-Accelerator to materialize Liquisect. Dex manages to land a Rider Kick on Liquisect. When Liquisect liquifies again, Dex turns into his Super Blue mode to follow him. Upon catching up to Liquisect, Dex destroys him with the Blue Saber before freeing Hal and Ferbus with Magno's aid.

=== Water Bug ===
- First Appearance: "Back To Nature" (7/6/96)
- Voice Actor: Kim Strauss

A brown crayfish-like monster with octopus tentacles on his hips and smaller ones for hair. He can shoot lasers from his claws. When the Stewart Family planned a camping trip, Nefaria tells Count Dregon that she'll use Water Bug in her plan. She plans to use Water Bug to carry a bomb on a boat which will explode once it is under the Leawood Bay Bridge. Nefaria sent an invitation to Dex to bring him to the boat which Water Bug will be on. Dex in his Masked Rider form caught up with Water Bug on the boat heading toward Leawood Bay Bridge. Dex detected a bomb in Water Bug's hidden pocket. During the fight, Dex turned into his Super Blue form and used his Blue Saber to cut open Water Bug's hidden pocket and dispose of the bomb. Water Bug escaped into the water with Dex not far behind. Upon following it to land, Dex is ambushed by Water Bug and ends up in a power drain beam planted there by Count Dregon. Dex used the Blue Saber to destroy the power drain beam. Dex then destroyed Water Bug with the Rider Kick.

=== Fleazoid ===
- First Appearance: "Testing 1, 2, 3" (7/13/96)
- Voice Actor: Dorothy Elias-Fahn

A purplish cicada/centipede-like monster with a red attachable/detachable exoskeleton that it controls. Nerfaria's plan was to get Chalmers to uncover Dex's true identity. However, her plan was far from successful. Dregon then lost patience and sent Gork and the Fleazoid monster to attack the Leawood Electronics Plants. Dex escaped Chalmers' testing facility and battled Fleazoid, but was also greeted by a small army of Commandoids with bazookas. The Commandoids blasted/bound Dex with plastic making him immobile to Fleazoid's attacks. Dex managed to turn to Super Blue to escape from Fleazoid, then defeated him with the Blue Saber.

=== Twister Bug ===
- First Appearance: "Showdown at Leawood High" (7/20/96)
- Voice Actor: Chuck Kovacic

A red and black humanoid ant-like monster with long white hair that was loyal to Gork. Twister Bug could cause tornadoes and other disastrous winds by simply twirling himself in circles. Combat Chopper notifies Dex that Twister Bug is causing trouble at the park. During Dex's first confrontation, his Super Gold form proved useless against Twister Bug as the monster clogged all of Dex's joints with dirt. As Super Blue, Dex could easily maneuver against Twister Bug who managed to escape. During their second fight at the quarry, Twister Bug almost had Dex in his Super Blue form trapped by burying him alive in a large ant hill. Magno raced to save the day by running down Twister Bug and plowing Dex free from the ant hill. Dex escaped from the anthill and knocked down Twister Bug with his liquified attack. Upon deactivating the Super Blue mode, Dex defeated Twister Bug with the Electro Saber.

=== Boulder Beetle ===
- First Appearance: "Power Out" (7/27/96)
- Voice Actor: Brad Orchard

A plant-covered rock monster that wore an orange loincloth. He can manipulate soil, split into rocks, and launch the rocks on his body. Boulder Beetle's heart had the power to emit Negative Proton Rays and can even allow him to regenerate. Nefaria wanted Boulder Beetle to use his Negative Proton Rays on Dex making the mission easier for Dregon. She set a trap for Dex by causing an explosion in Leawood Canyon. When Dex finds the hole, he is pulled under by Boulder Beetle and is grabbed the hands on the walls. Dex breaks free and transforms into Masked Rider. Dex broke free from the arms on the walls by turning into Super Blue. But after escaping from underground, Dex's Super Blue powers turned off. Dex eventually escaped on Combat Chopper. Later, Dex was given a recharge from Magno, Chopper and King Lexian to make him immune to Boulder Beetle's effect. When Nefaria sends Boulder Beetle on the attack, his Negative Proton Rays had no effect on Dex. Boulder Beetle was finally destroyed when Dex's Rider Kick hit him directly in his glowing stone heart.

=== Reptosect ===
- First Appearance: "Power Out" (7/27/96)
- Voice Actor: Ezra Weisz

Double Face was jealous that Nefaria and Boulder Beetle was picked over his plan. He called upon Reptosect, a green mantis-like monster with black hair and big steel teeth to assist him in battle. He can detach the blades on its back to throw them and use them as weapons. After Boulder Beetle's destruction, Reptosect stepped in with Double Face (who was wielding a War Saber). When Dex transformed into his Super Gold form, he broke Double Face's War Saber before destroying Reptosect with the Ecto-Ray.

=== Ultivore ===
- First Appearance: "Saturday Morning Invasion" (9/9/96)
- Voice Actor: Alonzo Bodden

A gold, cybernetic, battle machine Insectovore turned giant. He can shoot bullets from the gatling guns on her body, shoot a laser from its right eye, emit circular-like sawblades from its left eye, lower its pincers on her machine to grab, and emit insect-like legs from the torso to attack. In order to enact Nefaria and Cycloptor's plan that involves Ultivore, Count Dregon capture a stranded midget alien with the power to shrink and enlarge anything. After Nefaria and the Maggots kidnap the alien, Count Dregon then forced the alien to enlarge Ultivore enough to destroy Dex and the entire city of Leawood. Count Dregon then had Nefaria place the alien inside Ultivore. Dex detected Ultivore with the alien within him. Dex was outmatched by Ultivore's height upon confronting Ultivore at the local power plant. The alien evened things out by making Masked Rider into a giant as well much to the dismay of Count Dregon. Dex used his Rider Punch to get the alien out. Dex is then seized by Ultivore's pincers and attacked by the insect-like legs. Upon breaking free, Dex destroyed the Ultivore with a giant-sized Rider Kick. (Note: This monster was taken from Kamen Rider J rather than Kamen Rider Black RX. It was also the main villain of the movie and was known as the Machine Beast Mothership Fog Mother.)

=== Solarsect ===
- First Appearance: "Passenger Ferbus" (9/10/96)
- Voice Actor: Darren Wilson

Solarsect was a sword-wielding humanoid dressed in a green and yellow helmet, silver armor, and a black cape. Besides wielding a sword in battle and move through anything reflective, Solarsect has the ability was to harness the sun's rays and use them as a weapon. The Stewart family was on their way to visit Grandma and planned to travel by plane. Since Dex was going to be on a plane, it meant that he wouldn't be able to protect the city from Solarsect without revealing his identity. Eventually, Dex was able to engage in battle with Solarsect while Ferbus flew the plane. As Solarsect gets Dex trapped in his grip, Dex called Combat Chopper who managed to save Dex. When Dex is knocked off of Combat Chopper by one of Solarsect's attacks, Dex ends up surrounded by mirrors which Solarsect attacks from. Dex then uses his Electro Saber to destroy Solarsect. Fits the theme of Nefaria's monsters.

=== Dregonator ===
- First Appearance: "Mixed Doubles" (9/11/96)
- Voice Actor: Ken Merckx

A powerful golden robotic clone of Count Dregon. He wields a sword in battle. In order to get an Incapacitating Device onto Dex to claim the Masked Rider powers, Count Dregon is informed by Double Face that he has created a cloning device that brings out the evil in the clone. After the success of cloning an evil Stewart family with a cloning machine, Count Dregon promptly made a clone of himself that was more evil and powerful in battle than himself. Dex then freed the Stewarts from the Spiderbase and took on Dregonator (once he removed the Incapacitation Device that had been planted on his medallion) while the Stewarts take on their evil clones. After some attacks from Dregonator, Dex then transformed into his Super Gold form whose Ecto-Ray attack wasn't enough to phase the Dregonator. Dex then transformed into his Super Blue form and used his Blue Saber to damage the Dregonator. Dex deactivated his Super Blue form and destroyed Dregonator with the Electro Saber. (Note: In Kamen Rider Black RX, this is actually a transformed form of Count Dregon's counterpart General Jark called Jark Midler. He and Dregon were shown together in U.S. footage.)

=== Lavasect ===
- First Appearance: "Million Dollar Ferbus" (9/16/96)
- Voice Actor: Alfred Thor

A powerful and cataclysmic creature that resembled a giant head with three small faces (which shoot laser beams from its eyes) on its forehead and tentacles. Lavasect was trapped within Earth's core for 10,000,000,000 years. Nefaria learns of this and tells Count Dregon that they could use Lavasect against Dex. The Spiderbase heads into the Earth so that Count Dregon can meet Lavasect. When they encounter Lavasect, they learn that he will destroy Dex in exchange that he gets what Count Dregon has. Count Dregon retaliated and was attacked and constricted by Lavasect's tentacles. When Nefaria asks Lavasect to put Count Dregon down, Lavasect does and states that he'll come for Count Dregon once he's done destroying Dex. Not wanting Lavasect to succeed, Count Dregon hopes that Dex will stop Lavasect. Dex soon senses Lavasect and heads out to a nearby mantle where Dex falls in and confronts Lavasect. Dex transforms and fights Lavasect. After taking an attack from Lavasect's smaller faces, Dex transforms into his Super Gold form and ends up bound by the electrical beams shot from Lavasect's eyes. Dex breaks free and shoots Lavasect with the Ecto-Ray. Upon deactivating his Super Gold form, Dex attacks Lavasect with the Rider Kick before destroying Lavasect with the Electro Saber. (Note: His counterpart from Kamen Rider Black RX is Emperor Crisis who was the boss of General Jark and the main villain of the series.)

=== Manosect ===
- First Appearance: "Ectophase Albee" (9/17/96)
- Voice Actor: David Greenlee

A red robotic Asura-like monster. Besides spewing acidic foam, he wields a pitchfork, two swords, and a sickle in battle. When Nefaria finds out that Dex's Masked Rider powers have been transferred to Albee through a football accident, Count Dregon sent Manosect to capture Albee so Dregon can take the Masked Rider powers. Albee uses the Electro Saber to disarm Manosect of its pitchfork in combat before going Super Gold and destroying him with the Ecto-Ray. However, the events of Albee turning into Masked Rider and monster Manosect only occurred in a dream while Albee was unconscious.

=== Dread Dragon ===
- First Appearance: "Ectophase Albee" (9/17/96)
- Voice Actor: Tom Fahn

A scaley chicken/dragon/snake-like creature that had small dragon-like heads for hands and an extra mouth on its belly. He can breathe fire from its main head, shoot electricity from the dragon-like heads, and breathe steam from its extra mouth. After Manosect's destruction, Double Face suggested a follow-up attack and that the Dread Dragon would be powerful enough to defeat Albee. Dread Dragon attacked Albee up to the point where he trapped Albee in its jaws. Albee broke free and destroyed Dread Dragon with the Rider Kick. However, the events of Albee turning into Masked Rider and monster Dread Dragon only occurred in a dream while Albee was unconscious.

=== Cyborgator ===
- First Appearance: "Ectophase Albee" (9/17/96)
- Voice Actor: Bob Papenbrook

A lizard monster with poisonous fangs, poisonous claws, and a constricting tale. After Dread Dragon's destruction, Count Dregon unleashed this monster to attack Albee. Albee managed to knock it down with his punch. Cyborgator started to overwhelm Albee until he managed to punch Cyborgator in the eye. When climbing the side of a cliff during battle, Albee used his Rider Punch on Cyborgator's left eye causing him to fall off the cliffside and be destroyed in the fall. However, the events of Albee turning into Masked Rider and monster Cyborgator only occurred in a dream while Albee was unconscious. (Note: His counterpart from Kamen Rider J is Agito (J).)

=== Revenator ===
- First Appearance: "Race Against Time" (9/26/96)
- Voice Actor: Chuck Kovacic

A robotic race car monster. He can shoot bullets from the compartment in his chest, emit lasers from its horns, emit a square-shaped barrier, and throw razor wheels. When it comes to Albee wanting to win a remote-control race car race, Count Dregon decides to use Revenator. He was sent to Earth as a regular remote-control race car that was given to Albee as a present. Count Dregon called Revenator the "car that cannot lose." Dregon used him to lead Nefaria to Dex's cave to destroy Magno and Combat Chopper. After Dex fended off Nefaria, Revenator attacks. Dex transforms into Masked Rider and brings the fight outside of the cave. When Revenator has restrained him, Dex calls for Magno and uses her to escape. Revenator caught up with Dex at the boat yard and attacks Dex alongside Cycloptor and Double Face. After taking an attack from Cycloptor and Revenator, Dex transformed into his Super Blue form and used his Blue Saber to destroy Revenator.

=== Parasect ===
- First Appearance: "Cat-Atomic" (10/14/96)

A black bat monster. Before Catatron was created, Dregon's minions tried their new invention on an ordinary vampire bat, turning it into a monster. Parasect had small-but-long bat wings for ears that covered its head (unless he's flying) and had an eye on each hand much like Destructosphere. He was only shown in the demonstration of the device. (Note: Parasect was taken from Kamen Rider ZO rather than Kamen Rider Black RX where his counterpart was called Koumori Man.) (Note: This monster should not be confused with the Pokémon of the same name.)

=== Catatron ===
- First Appearance: "Cat-Atomic" (10/14/96)
- Voice Actor: Paul Pistore

A red-haired tiger monster. Count Dregon developed a device that could turn anything into a monster. After it was tested on a vampire bat, Count Dregon sets his sights on Leawood High's tiger mascot costume. While Herbie was repairing the torn costume, the Maggots stole the tiger costume and brought it to life with the device turning it into Catatron. Catatron had a tiger's fury and tossed small black boomerangs in battle. After Dex suspected the costume wasn't human during cheerleading tryouts, he went after Catatron. Catatron was a very powerful monster indeed, proving to be too much for even Super Gold. However, Dex transformed into Super Blue and was able to defeat him with the Blue Saber. Thus, the costume was reverted to normal.

=== Spearavore ===
- First Appearance: "Indigestion" (10/21/96)
- Voice Actor: Tony Smyles

A pink-colored unspecified Yōkai monster that wields a spear. He can emit energy beams from his spear. In his latest plot to take the Masked Rider powers, Count Dregon had a poisoned meal prepared for Dex. While Dex was recovering from a poison slipped in his food, Count Dregon took the opportunity to send Spearavore. With help from King Lexian, Dex recovered and went out to confront Spearavore. When Dex as Masked Rider encountered Spearavore, he turned into his Super Gold form and was immobilized by Spearavore's attack. After managing to blast Spearavore with the Ecto-Ray, Dex deactivated his Super Gold form and quickly destroyed Spearavore with a single swipe from the Electro Saber.

=== Space Monkey ===
- First Appearance: "Indigestion" (10/21/96)
- Voice Actor: Brian Tahash

A white ape monster. He wields an extendable staff that shoots beams from it. Space Monkey attacked Dex not long after Dex had defeated Spearavore. As Super Blue, Dex confronted Space Monkey and his Ninja Apes. After defeating the Ninja Apes, Dex fought Space Monkey. After a hit from Space Monkey's staff, Dex called in Combat Chopper and managed to evade Space Monkey's extending staff. When Dex knocks the Space Monkey off the cliff he climbed up, Dex deactivated his Super Blue form and destroyed Space Monkey with the Electro Saber.

==== Ninja Apes ====
- First Appearance: "Indigestion" (10/21/96)

The Ninja Apes are a group of smaller ape-like ninjas that accompany Space Monkey in fighting Dex. They are all defeated by Dex.

=== Fluffy ===
- First Appearance: "Dex At Bat" (10/31/96)
- Voice Actor: Michael Sorich

A flying squirrel-like monster. Albee was pet sitting his friend's bat, but it was accidentally released from its cage. Fact picked the disturbance at the Stewart home and Dregon had Double Face use a Power Enhancement Ray to turn Fluffy into an Insectovore. In this form, Fluffy can breathe fire and shoot electricity from his eyes. Dex and Albee went to find the missing bat only to find it attacking the public. By playing loud music, Dex and Albee managed to lure it away where Dex engaged Fluffy. After dodging Fluffy's fire attacks, Dex transformed into Masked Rider. After being hit by the Rider Kick, Fluffy changed back to normal when the Rider Kick was enough to cancel the effect of the Power Enhancement Ray.

=== Bananatex ===
- First Appearance: "Dex At Bat" (10/31/96)
- Voice Actor: Kermit Beachwood

A green and white-furred demonic shaman monster with bat wings for ears. He wields a staff and is armed with bananas that can be used for various purposes. Bananatex used his bananas to infiltrate the Leawood Defense Plant to steal rare explodium gold. Dex watched the news report and recognized the banana as a Borneo Banana. After some detective work, Dex learned about a weird guy who bought them en masse. The weird guy was Bananatex in disguise, meaning Count Dregon was in possession of the highly explosive metal. After a brief scuffle, Bananatex got away. Following Fluffy's defeat, Dex traced Bananatex to a nearby bridge where the explodium gold is planted. After throwing one of Bananatex's bananas back at him. Dex transformed into his Super Blue form and turned into liquid to evade Bananatex's banana attacks. Dex destroyed Bananatex with his Blue Saber.

=== Bruticon ===
- First Appearance: "The Invasion of Leawood" (11/4/96)
- Voice Actor: Bob Papenbrook

A Styracosaurus-themed super-monster that was one of the strongest Insectovores in Dregon's army. He can shoot an electrical beam from his right claw and turn into energy. He ruled a galaxy that Count Dregon conquered and had summoned it to Earth in a plot to defeat Masked Rider. Count Dregon had sent a televised message to Masked Rider to face Bruticon or else Count Dregon and his forces would invade Leawood. Bruticon was so powerful in fact that one Masked Rider alone wasn't enough to defeat it. King Lexian then decided to enlist the aide of the legendary Masked Rider warriors AKA the Masked Riders that came before Dex. It arrived on Earth in a ball of fire and attacked the Radio Astronomy Center on Harbor Island. When with Double Face, Bruticon prevented Dex from using his Electro Saber on him and overwhelmed him until the Masked Rider Warriors arrived. While the warriors dealt with Bruticon, Dex went one-on-one with Double Face. After Double Face retreated, Dex joined the fight against Bruticon. Bruticon proved too strong for even Super Gold, but Dex reasoned that perhaps Bruticon wasn't as tough on the inside as he was on the outside. He then used his Super Blue power to ride a torrent of water inside and destroy Bruticon from within by attacking with his Blue Saber. Once Bruticon was destroyed, it caused a power surge which affected the Spiderbase.

=== Ocusect ===
- First Appearance: "The Eye of Edenoi" (11/5/96)
- Voice Actor: Rebecca Forstadt

A multi-eyed Hyakume creature from an Edenoi fairy tale. She wields a magic staff in battle and can imprison anyone within its main eye and can even shoot optic beams when in its eye form. According to Dex, any Edenoite who stared into the main eye of Ocusect would be frozen with fear forever and that anyone who is within Ocusect's main eye will be absorbed into its body forever. Dex was deathly afraid of the Ocusect when he was young. Count Dregon (who was also afraid of the Ocusect that haunted his nightmares) decided to bring Dex's worst fear to life by taking Cycloptor's idea to create an Ocusect that they can control. When the Maggots were sent down with Ocusect's eye form, they ended up accidentally imprisoning Patsy in it. Since Ocusect needs recharging after imprisoning each victim, Nefaria had the Maggots hide Ocusect's eye form. Dex caught up with the Maggots and fended them off. When Herbie caught up with Dex, Ocusect appeared. Dex was frozen in fear and Herbie tried to get Dex away only to end up imprisoned in Ocusect's main eye. With some wisdom from King Lexian, Dex decides to overcome his fear. As Masked Rider, Dex rides Combat Chopper to an abandoned cabin where Ocusect is hiding. When Ocusect manages to use its main eye to fear-freeze Dex, she then absorbs him into her main eye. Dex then turns into Super Blue and liquifies out of Ocusect. Dex then battles Ocusect. Upon turning into his Super Gold form, Dex uses his Ecto-Ray to blast Ocusect enough for her to release Patsy and Herbie. Upon deactivating Super Gold, Dex used the Rider Kick to knock down Ocusect. Ocusect then transforms into her eye form and attacks. Upon stating that he's not afraid of Ocusect anymore, Dex uses his Electro Saber to stab Ocusect's eye form which leads to Ocusect's destruction. Fits the theme of Nefaria's monsters. (Note: Its eye form was seen in American footage. Her counterpart from Kamen Rider Black RX is Hundred-Eyed Hag and is the aunt of Nefaria's counterpart.)

=== Lobstatron ===
- First Appearance: "Exit Nefaria, Enter Barbaria" (11/18/96)
- Voice Actor: Lex Lang

A water flea-resembling monster with scythe-blades for hands and water flea-like legs between its upper back and shoulders. Count Dregon was viewing the fight between Dex and Lobstatron. Dex destroyed him using the Electro Saber.

=== Predavore ===
- First Appearance: "Exit Nefaria, Enter Barbaria" (11/18/96)
- Voice Actor: Randy Elliot

A blue monster with long horns and black and white spots. He wields a sword in battle. Following Count Dregon sending the Maggots to kidnap Barbara Stewart and transferring Nefaria's personality into her transforming Barbara into Barbaria, Count Dregon prepared Predavore for when Barbaria brings Dex to him. After Barbaria reveals herself, Dex senses the Predavore attacking a nearby chemical plant. After getting the rest of the family away from Barbaria, Dex transformed and confronted Predavore. During battle, Barbaria appeared and told Predavore to complete his job. After a brief scuffle with Barbaria, Dex confronted Predavore and Double Face at the chemical plant. The fight between Dex and the Predavore continues outside the chemical plant. Dex destroyed Predavore with the Electro Saber after disarming him.

=== Brain Mite ===
- First Appearance: "Detention" (11/20/96)
- Voice Actor: Ezra Weisz

Brain Mite was a bluish demon monster with a pitchfork-like weapon. He can also shoot a beam from his head. When Count Dregon tried a new approach by attacking Dex from within his head, he had Nefaria sent the Maggots to implant Brain Mite into Dex's brain. Brain Mite then took over Dex's body while Dex was serving detention at school. While Brain Mite was doing his job, Count Dregon sent Nefaria to take over the internet in order to send an energy pulse that will turn anyone on the computer into Count Dregon's soldiers. At one point, Brain Mite even controlled Dex's speech, causing Dex to mouth off at Principal Chalmers. When Dex found out that Brain Mite is in him, he managed to put everyone in detention to sleep before transforming into Masked Rider and heading to the Leawood Sewer System to track down Nefaria. Dex tried to extract Brain Mite with his Super Blue power, but Brain Mite punctured Dex's brain, causing the Masked Rider to fall unconscious. Once Brain Mite came out, he was instructed to bring his body to Nefaria in order to extract the Masked Rider Powers. Masked Rider recovered upon turning into Super Blue and fought Brain Mite and the Commandoids. The fight ended up damaging the computers there. Masked Rider used his Blue Saber to deflect Brian Mite's attack. After destroying Brain Mite's pitchfork, Masked Rider deactivated his Super Blue powers and used his Electro Saber to disarm and destroy Brain Mite.
