= List of Power Rangers Time Force characters =

Power Rangers Time Force is the 2001 season of Power Rangers which sees a group from the Time Force law enforcement agency travel back in time from the year 3000 to pursue Ransik's army of mutants.

== Main characters ==
=== Time Force Power Rangers ===
The Time Force Rangers

The Time Force Rangers are a group of law enforcement officers from the Time Force organization in the year 3000 dedicated to preventing time anomalies from affecting the timestream. While pursuing a mutant gang leader called Ransik, the group crash-land near the fictional city of Silver Hills in the year 2001, establish a base for themselves in an abandoned clock tower, and work undercover as workers for Nick of Time Odd Jobs while apprehending the mutants.

==== Wes Collins ====
Wesley "Wes" Collins is the estranged son of a tycoon who is recruited by the Time Force Rangers to operate as their Red Ranger in the place of his DNA match, Alex Drake. He develops feelings for teammate Jen Scotts over the course of the series. After the Time Force Rangers apprehend Ransik and return to their time, Wes is allowed to keep his powers and joins the Silver Guardians.

Wes Collins is portrayed by Jason Faunt.

==== Lucas Kendall ====
Lucas Kendall is a suave yet vain racecar driver and Time Force officer who operates as the group's Blue Ranger.

Lucas is portrayed by Michael Copon.

==== Trip ====
Trip is a naïve, occasionally gullible yet kind-hearted alien from the planet Xybria and Time Force officer who operates as the group's Green Ranger, technician, and inventor. Through the use of a green forehead gem, he possesses psychic powers such as telepathy, remote viewing, and precognition.

Trip is portrayed by Kevin Kleinberg.

==== Katie Walker ====
Katie Walker is a courageous and kindhearted Time Force officer who operates as the group's Yellow Ranger and possesses superhuman strength.

Katie Walker is portrayed by Deborah Estelle Philips.

==== Jen Scotts ====
Jennifer "Jen" Scotts is a cold, strict, no-nonsense Time Force officer, a skilled martial artist, and the leader of the Time Force Rangers who operates as their Pink Ranger. After Ransik seemingly kills her fiancé Alex Drake, she leads her group in pursuing the former back in time to 2001. There, they encounter Alex's ancestor, Wes, who gradually helps Jen soften up over the course of the series. Upon learning Alex is alive and manipulated her team, she breaks off their engagement.

Jen Scotts is portrayed by Erin Cahill.

=== Eric Myers ===
Eric Myers is a reserved and standoffish soldier, member of the Silver Guardians private security service, and a former private school classmate of Wes Collins. Having grown up poor and worked hard all his life, he initially views Wes as a spoiled socialite who never had to work to achieve his goals, which led to Eric leaving the school. Ever since, Eric became bitter and resentful towards those like Wes and made few friends despite Wes' best efforts. After discovering Wes's secret identity, Eric acquires Time Force technology, becomes the red-colored Quantum Ranger, and eventually takes over leadership of the Silver Guardians. Following this, he fights the mutants and Time Force alike, though he gradually becomes a reluctant ally to the latter over time. By the end of the series, he reconciles with Wes and shares his role with him after he joins the Silver Guardians.

Eric Myers is portrayed by Daniel Southworth.

== Recurring characters ==
=== Alex Drake ===
Alex Drake is the dedicated yet cold former Red Time Force Ranger, Jen Scotts' fiancé, and distant descendant of Wes Collins. After being grievously injured by Ransik, Alex goes on to recover, assume a position of authority within Time Force, and provide covert assistance to the Time Force Rangers. Eventually, he reveals himself and travels to 2001 to reassume his position as the Time Force Red Ranger and correct time anomalies. However, he is eventually convinced to return his powers to Wes and that the future can be changed. During the series finale, after Wes sends his friends back to their time, Alex reluctantly allows them to return to save Wes, during which Jen breaks off their engagement.

Alex Drake is portrayed by Jason Faunt.

=== Circuit ===
Circuit is a robotic owl and the Time Force Rangers' technical advisor.

Circuit is voiced by Brianne Siddall.

=== Mr. Collins ===
Mr. Collins is a tycoon, the CEO of Bio-Lab, founder of the Silver Guardians private security service, and Wes Collins' estranged father. Viewing his son as a failure for not following his ideals, Mr. Collins works to protect Silver Hills independently of the Time Force Rangers. Upon learning Wes' secret identity, he gradually begins to reconcile with him. Furthermore, Mr. Collins goes on to reform the Silver Guardians to function more akin to traditional police.

Mr. Collins is portrayed by Edward Laurence Albert.

=== Mutants ===
The Mutants are the failed byproducts of genetic experiments conducted in the 31st century who were shunned by society and became criminals. Though many were imprisoned by Time Force, a powerful mutant called Ransik hijacks a mutant prison and escapes with it to the year 2001. After being pursued by the Time Force Rangers, the mutants are eventually re-imprisoned and returned to their time.

==== Ransik ====
Ransik is a cold and logical mutant crime lord who despises humanity due to mutant prejudice and possesses energy projection, skill in martial arts, and telekinesis. Following an encounter with a trio of Orgs, he acquired the ability to produce weapons from his body in exchange for turning them into "Mut-Orgs". Despite his power, an attack by a mutant called Venomark left Ransik dependent on a serum developed by Dr. Louis Ferricks, who he left for dead, to stabilize his mutant DNA.

After being arrested by Alex Drake, Ransik is broken out by his daughter Nadira and robotic underling Frax. He then goes on to grievously injure Alex, hijack a mutant prison, and escape with it to the year 2001. Despite being pursued by the Time Force Rangers, Ransik and his forces wreak havoc on the city of Silver Hills, during which he eventually learns the Bio-Lab company developed a variant of Ferricks' serum, which Ransik uses to permanently relieve himself of his instability. After running out of mutant prisoners, Ransik battles the Time Force Rangers personally until he inadvertently attacks Nadira, who had changed her views on humanity and convinces him to do the same. Motivated by her, Ransik willingly turns himself in and is returned to his time.

In the Power Rangers Wild Force two-part episode "Reinforcements from the Future", the Time Force Rangers free Ransik to help them and the Wild Force Rangers combat the Mut-Orgs. Amidst the battle, he purges the monsters and himself of their mutant DNA, turning them back into normal Orgs and rendering himself human.

Ransik is portrayed by Vernon Wells.

==== Nadira ====
Nadira is Ransik's obnoxious, greedy, and vain daughter who possesses the ability to extend her fingernails, superhuman strength, the ability to instantaneously change her outfit, and teleport. After helping Ransik escape Time Force's custody and traveling back in time to 2001, she takes to stealing clothing, jewelry, and money; primarily through petty theft and extortion. After helping Trip deliver a pregnant woman's baby and playing with human children however, Nadira comes to question her and Ransik's hatred towards humanity. Following a discussion with Frax regarding hatred's cyclical nature, she eventually convinces Ransik to let go of his hate and turn himself in.

As of the Power Rangers Wild Force two-part episode "Reinforcements from the Future", she has been sentenced to perform community service with Lucas Kendall's help.

Nadira is portrayed by Kate Sheldon.

==== Gluto ====
Gluto is a mafioso/blue whale-themed mutant criminal who aligns himself with Ransik after he averts his imprisonment. He continues to assist Ransik throughout the series until they run out of prisoners to free, leading to Gluto imprisoning himself out of cowardice.

Gluto is voiced by Neil Kaplan.

==== Minor mutants ====
- Flamecon: A punk-themed mutant. He terrorizes Silver Hills until he is re-apprehended by the Time Force Rangers. Flamecon is voiced by Michael Sorich.
- Jetara: A ladybug-themed mutant. He attacks Silver Hills' police force until he is re-apprehended by the Time Force Rangers. Jetara is voiced by Derek Stephen Prince.
- Fearog: A gecko-themed mutant sent by Ransik to attack Wes Collins, only to be re-apprehended by the Time Force Rangers. Fearog is voiced by David Stenstrom.
- Mantamobile: A water flea-themed mutant car thief who can use his tentacles to hijack and upgrade vehicles. He joins Nadira and Gluto in stealing 21st century vehicles until he is re-apprehended by the Time Force Rangers. Mantamobile is voiced by Richard Steven Horvitz.
- Tentaclaw: A mutant kidnapper whose octopus-like head and lobster-like body can separate and act independently of each other. Nadira frees him to help her kidnap a busload of children and hold them for ransom until he is re-apprehended by the Time Force Rangers. Tentaclaw is voiced by Ezra Weisz.
- Rabbitcon: A copepod-themed mutant. He is voiced by an uncredited Eddie Frierson.
- Medicon: A surgeon-themed mutant cyborg. He assists Nadira in sabotaging Circuit before attacking the Time Force Rangers, who eventually re-apprehend him. Medicon is voiced by Dan Woren.
- Fatcatfish: A cowardly catfish-themed mutant cyborg bounty hunter who possesses a Gatling gun-like arm and previously fought Jen Scotts and Alex Drake. Ransik frees and hires him to kill the Time Force Rangers. While fighting them, Jen nearly kills Fatcatfish before her friends convince her to re-apprehend him instead. Fatcatfish is voiced by Tom Wyner.
- Izout: A heavily-armed hammerhead shark-themed mutant cyborg. He assists Frax in breaking into Bio-Lab to steal Zirium powder until he is re-apprehended by the Time Force Rangers. Izout is voiced by David Lodge.
- Redeye: A swallow-themed mutant. Ransik frees her to terrorize Silver Hills until she is re-apprehended by the Time Force Rangers. Redeye is voiced by Wendee Lee.
- Electropede: A caterpillar/millipede-themed mutant capable of draining energy. Ransik frees him to drain Silver Hill's power. However, Trip develops the Electro-Booster to overload Electropede, causing him to safely discharge the energy he had absorbed, before the latter is re-apprehended by the Time Force Rangers. Electropede is voiced by Steve Kramer.
- Brickneck: A brick/cocoon-themed mutant soldier. Ransik sends him to attack a dig site and retrieve the Quantum Controller, only for Brickneck to be re-apprehended by the Quantum Ranger. Brickneck is voiced by Michael Sorich.
- Commandocon: A commando/poacher-themed mutant who possesses metallic armor, a control device-shooting spear, and the ability to open time portals. Ransik frees him so he can retrieve and gain control of the Quantasaurus Rex before the Time Force Rangers, only for Commandocon to be re-apprehended by the Quantum Ranger. Commandocon is voiced by Dave Mallow.
- Klawlox: A hammerhead shark/mollusk/lobster-themed mutant. Ransik frees him to assist Nadira in kidnapping Dr. Michael Zaskin to interrogate him for information on the Quantum Ranger's powers until Klawlox is re-apprehended by the Time Force Rangers. Klawlox is voiced by Tony Oliver.
- Turtlecon: A turtle-themed mutant scientist who possesses a remote that can send people to other dimensions. Ransik frees him to fight the Time Force Rangers, who eventually re-apprehend him. Turtlecon is voiced by Steve McGowan.
- Notacon: A powerful yet kind-hearted jellyfish/squid-themed mutant who was imprisoned for petty theft. Ransik forces him to fight the Time Force Rangers, but Notacon escapes and befriends Trip. After being accosted by the Silver Guardians and temporarily brainwashed by Frax, Notacon is rescued by the Time Force Rangers before turning himself in. Notacon is voiced by Barbara Goodson.
- Conwing: A squid-themed mutant who can disguise himself as a human and possesses a mask capable of mimicking voices. Ransik frees him to capture the Quantum Ranger and take control of the Quantasaurus Rex. However, the Time Force Rangers rescue the Quantum Ranger, who re-apprehends Conwing. Conwing is voiced by Sean Cw Johnson while his human disguise is portrayed by Don Dowe.
- Dash: A grasshopper/racecar driver-themed mutant and friendly rival of Lucas Kendall who can assume a human form. After endangering civilians with his reckless driving sometime prior to the series, Lucas testified against him before seeing him imprisoned. In the present, Ransik frees Dash to serve as Nadira's driver until Lucas helps him see the error of his ways. She forcibly equips Dash with mind control armor, but he is freed by the Time Force Rangers and turns himself in. Dash is voiced by Riley Schmidt, who also portrays his human form.
- Contemptra: A Gorgon-themed mutant who can brainwash men with a mind control bracelet and assume a human form under the alias of "Angelique". Ransik frees her to use her bracelet on the male Time Force Rangers. However, the female Rangers destroy her bracelet before all five re-apprehend her. Contemptra is voiced by Valerie Vernon while Angelique is portrayed by Rachelle Pettinato.
- Ironspike: An Oni-themed mutant who possesses superhuman strength, eye lasers, and a sword. Ransik frees him to attack Silver Hills until he is re-apprehended by the Time Force Rangers. Ironspike is voiced by Richard Cansino.
- Artillicon: A heavily-armed mutant cyborg who can transform into a fighter jet. Ransik frees him to attack Silver Hills until he is re-apprehended by the Time Force Rangers. Artillicon is voiced by Bob Papenbrook.
- Cinecon: A film director-themed mutant who possesses a clapperboard that can trap people in film genre-esque illusions, a script capable of altering reality based on what is written in it, and the ability to assume a human disguise. Ransik frees him to use his powers on the Time Force Rangers, who eventually re-apprehend Cinecon. Cinecon is voiced by Terrence Stone while his human disguise is portrayed by Harvey Shain.
- Steelix: A steel-themed mutant and a corrupt Time Force officer who previously worked as Jen Scotts' partner before betraying Time Force to sell their information to Ransik. After being freed by him, Steelix seeks revenge on Jen for exposing and arresting him. However, he is eventually re-apprehended by the Time Force Rangers. Steelix is voiced by J.W. Myers.
- Severax: An axe-themed mutant cyborg. After Frax destroys his serum supply and escapes, Ransik frees Severax to assist him in finding Frax and raiding Bio-Lab to steal their variant of the serum until Severax is re-apprehended by the Time Force Rangers. Severax is voiced by Paul Schrier.
- Mr. Mechanau: A false prophet-themed mutant who possesses a sword, telekinesis, and the ability to assume a human disguise. After being freed by Frax, Mechanau disguises himself as a salesman to trick Silver Hills' inhabitants into buying fitness drinks that cause them to behave robotically until he is re-apprehended by the Time Force Rangers. Mr. Mechanau is voiced by Mike Reynolds while his human disguise is portrayed by C.J. Byrnes.
- Miracon: A brain coral/computer keyboard-themed mutant who can travel through reflective surfaces. Ransik frees him to attack the Time Force Rangers, who eventually re-apprehend him. Miracon is voiced by Philip Proctor.
- Angelcon: A robotic angel-themed mutant the Time Force Rangers encountered and defeated while in Miracon's mirror dimension. Angelcon is voiced by Kirk Thornton.
- Chameliacon: A chameleon-themed mutant with a powerful tongue. Ransik frees him to attend to Nadira and kill the Time Force Rangers, who eventually re-apprehend him. Chameliacon is voiced by Kerrigan Mahan.
- Serpicon: A giant girdled lizard-themed mutant. Ransik frees him to attack and destroy the Silver Hills Cosmic Center. However, he is thwarted and re-apprehended by the Time Force Rangers. Serpicon is voiced by Mark A. Richardson.

==== X-Vault mutants ====
The X-Vault mutants are the most dangerous mutant criminals who are stored in a separate section of the prison called the "X-Vault", which can only be unlocked by a key in Frax's possession. Frax frees them to destroy Silver Hills and kill the Time Force Rangers, who eventually re-imprison them.

- Vexicon: A toy-themed mutant who views himself as the most powerful mutant. Vexicon is voiced by Richard Epcar.
- Univolt: An electricity-powered cicada-themed mutant cyborg. Univolt is voiced by Bob Papenbrook.
- Venomark: An amoeba-themed mutant who previously attacked Ransik and possesses superhuman speed, the ability to conjure a sword, and a poisonous bite, with a serum originally developed by Dr. Louis Ferricks being the only known cure. Unlike the other X-Vault mutants, Frax frees Venomark to infect Silver Hills' citizens with his bite. However, Wes Collins procures a sample of Ransik's serum for Bio-Lab to mass-produce. While the Silver Guardians cure Venomark's victims, the Time Force Rangers re-apprehend the mutant himself. Venomark is voiced by Kim Strauss.

=== Frax ===
Frax is a robot in Ransik's service who constructs Cyclotrons to serve as foot soldiers. Due to Ransik abusing him and the Cyclotrons, Frax eventually rebels, revealing that he used to be Dr. Louis Ferricks, a human scientist who tried to help Ransik, only to be attacked by him and left for dead. Embittered by the betrayal, Ferricks rebuilt himself as Frax and swore revenge. Following several failed attempts to kill the Time Force Rangers with an army of giant robots, Frax is captured, has his memories removed, and reprogrammed to serve Ransik loyally before being deployed to destroy Silver Hills until Wes Collins destroys him.

Frax is voiced by Eddie Frierson while Dr. Louis Ferricks is portrayed by Jeff Griggs.

== Guest characters ==
- Captain Logan: The head of Time Force, the Time Force Rangers' commanding officer, and later Alex's subordinate. Captain Logan is portrayed by Roy Werner.
- Philips: The Collins family's butler and chauffeur who often provides advice to Wes Collins. Philips is portrayed by Douglas Fisher.
- Dr. Michael Zaskin: A Bio-Lab scientist and employee of Mr. Collins. Dr. Michael Zaskin is portrayed by Ken Merckx.
- Alice Roberts: A young girl and Eric Myers' neighbor. Alice Roberts is portrayed by Darcy O'Donnell.
- Mitch: A reporter and photographer who discovers the Time Force Rangers' secret identities before Katie Walker convinces him not to expose them. Mitch is portrayed by Zachary Bostrom.
- White Knight: An unnamed knight and guardian of a power source called the "Battle Fire". Despite being defeated and killed by a Black Knight, the White Knight's spirit helps Wes Collins claim the Battle Fire. The White Knight is voiced by Oliver Page.
- Black Knight: An unnamed knight who seeks the Battle Fire. After a White Knight seals it in a box, the Black Knight employs a dragon to guard it and spends centuries searching for warriors with pure hearts to unlock the box for him. By the 21st century, his quest brings him into conflict with the Time Force Rangers, with Wes Collins eventually retrieving and using the Battle Fire to kill the Black Knight. The Black Knight is voiced by Dave Mallow.
- Vypra: A demoness who previously fought the Lightspeed Rangers until she was absorbed by Queen Bansheera. After returning as a ghost, Vypra aligns herself with Ransik to free the super demon Quarganon due to her ghostly status leaving her unable to do so herself. Despite succeeding, she is killed once more by the Time Force and Lightspeed Rangers. Vypra is portrayed by Jennifer L. Yen.
- Lightspeed Rangers: A group of civil servants associated with the government organization "Operation Lightspeed" who operate out of Mariner Bay and previously fought demons led by Queen Bansheera. Upon learning of Vypra's return, they join forces with the Time Force Rangers to thwart and kill her once more.
  - Carter Grayson: A firefighter who operates as the Red Lightspeed Ranger. Carter Grayson is portrayed by Sean Cw Johnson.
  - Chad Lee: A martial artist and aquatic performer who operates as the Blue Lightspeed Ranger. Chad Lee is portrayed by Michael Chaturantabut.
  - Joel Rawlings: A stunt pilot who operates as the Green Lightspeed Ranger. Joel Rawlings is portrayed by Keith Robinson.
  - Kelsey Winslow: An extreme sports enthusiast who operates as the Yellow Lightspeed Ranger. Kelsey Winslow is portrayed by Sasha Williams.
  - Dana Mitchell: An Operation Lightspeed medic who operates as the Pink Lightspeed Ranger. Dana Mitchell is portrayed by Alison MacInnis.
  - Ryan Mitchell: Dana's brother who operates as the Titanium Ranger. Ryan Mitchell is portrayed by Rhett Fisher.
- Angela Fairweather: An Operation Lightspeed scientist, ally of the Lightspeed Rangers, and wife of Joel Rawlings. Angela Fairweather is portrayed by Monica Louwerens.
- Quarganon: A "super demon" who was imprisoned within an artifact called the "Solar Amulet". After being freed by Vypra, he helps her fight the Time Force and Lightspeed Rangers until the pair are killed in battle by them. Quarganon is voiced by an uncredited Ron Roggé who previously played Captain Mitchell in Lightspeed Rescue.
