= Gluto =

Gluto may refer to:

- Gluto, a mafioso-like villain from Power Rangers: Time Force
- Gluto, a gelatinous character from Ben 10: Secret of the Omnitrix
- Gluto.com, a leading syndicate manager for the EuroMillions Lottery
