= Jessica Rey =

American actress and fashion designer

- Born: Fort Campbell, Kentucky, U.S.
- Education: California State University, Fullerton (BA); Loyola Marymount University (MBA)
- Occupations: Actress; fashion designer
- Years active: 1993–present
- Known for: Alyssa Enrilé / White Wild Force Ranger in Power Rangers Wild Force
- Children: 3

Jessica Rey is an American actress and fashion designer. She is best known for her role as Alyssa Enrilé/White Wild Force Ranger in the TV series Power Rangers Wild Force. She is also the founder and CEO of Rey Swimwear.

== Early life and career ==
Rey was born in Fort Campbell, Kentucky and moved with her parents at age three to Orange County, California. Rey was raised Catholic. She graduated from California State University, Fullerton with a BA in accounting. She then moved to Los Angeles, where she earned an MBA in marketing at Loyola Marymount University. She worked in a TV production company where people encouraged her to act. She has appeared in commercials for Time Warner and Gillette Tag Body Spray and in print-ads for T-Mobile and Verizon.

Rey played Alyssa Enrilé/White Wild Force Ranger in the TV series Power Rangers Wild Force. She was cast in a role on the sit-com Rules of Engagement. She started a retail company selling swimwear using the actress Audrey Hepburn as inspiration for her designs. She is also a speaker and travels to talk about chastity and modesty.

== Personal life ==
She is married and has two sons and a daughter.

== Filmography ==
- The Young and the Restless (1993, TV Series) - 'Jabot' make-up girl
- Power Rangers Wild Force (2002, TV Series) - Alyssa Enrilé / White Wild Force Ranger
- The Lawyer Trap (2004) - Alana
- The Stones
- The Big Bang (2004) - Kelli
- Las Vegas (2004, TV Series) - Kelli
- Rules of Engagement (2007, TV Series) - Polynesian waitress
- General Hospital (2009, TV Series) - Marita
- No Nerds Here (2014) - Herself
