= David Walsh (actor) =

American voice actor

Dave (David) Walsh is an American voice actor who is probably best known for doing the voice of the Blue Senturion in Power Rangers Turbo. He has done other voice acting in video games and animated cartoons.

Walsh has been involved in sound recording and ADR writing/directing. He was the ADR director for Power Rangers between Zeo and Time Force.

== Filmography ==
=== Cartoon voice-overs ===
- Superman: The Animated Series - Captain Croissant (voice)
- Batman Beyond - Stage Manager, Boy Student, Dirk, Rocketeer (voices)
- Family Guy (ep: Fast Times at Buddy Cianci, Jr. High)

=== Live-action voice-over ===
- Big Bad Beetleborgs - Skullhead (voice)
- Power Rangers Zeo - Cruel Chrome (voice, uncredited)
- Power Rangers Turbo - Blue Senturion (voice), Visceron (voice, uncredited)
- Power Rangers in Space - Blue Senturion (voice, uncredited)
- Power Rangers Wild Force (ep: Forever Red) - Automon (voice, uncredited)

=== Movie roles ===
- Batman Beyond: The Movie - Dirk (voice)

=== Video game roles ===
- Star Wars Rogue Squadron III: Rebel Strike - Commander 5, Imperial Generic, Wingman 6
- Judge Dredd: Dredd Vs. Death - Additional Voices
- Shadow of Rome - Additional Voices
- Neverwinter Nights 2 - Bishop, PC (Male Methodical Caster)
- Jade Empire - First Brother Kai, Philosopher Jiao, Additional Voices
- Driver Parallel Lines - TK
