= Jason Faunt =

American actor (born 1974)

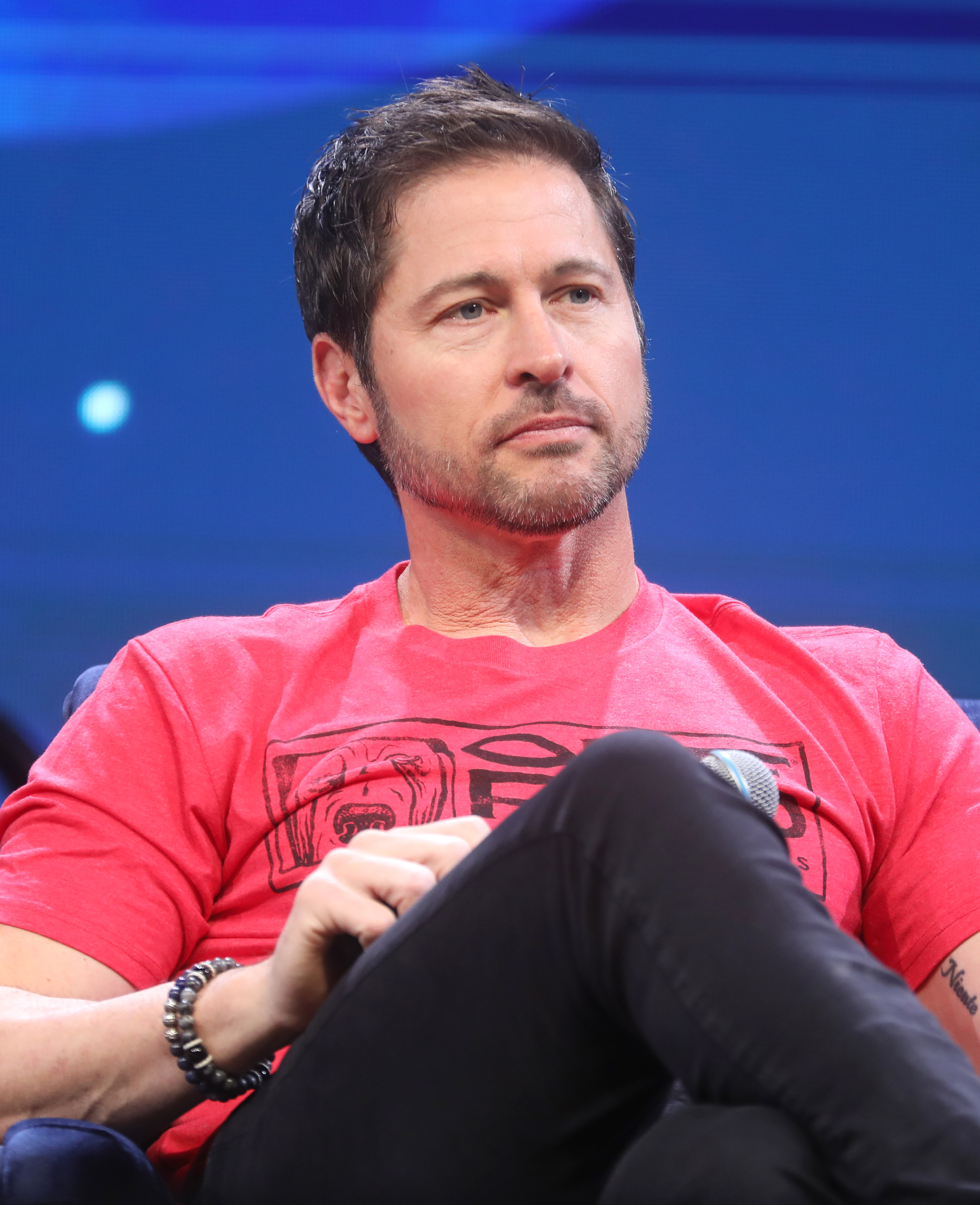
- Faunt in 2024
- Born: Jason Patrick Faunt; November 20, 1974 (age 51); Chicago, Illinois, U.S.
- Occupation: Actor
- Years active: 1999–present
- Spouses: Stephanie Faunt (m. 2002; div. 2014); Angela Lin (m. 2022)
- Children: 4

Jason Patrick Faunt (born November 20, 1974) is an American actor. He is best known for the role as Wesley Collins in Power Rangers Time Force, as well as his descendant Alex Drake, the former Red Time Force Ranger.

== Early life ==
Faunt was born in Chicago, Illinois, and grew up in McHenry, Illinois. He attended McHenry High School East Campus. Due to his athletic prowess in high school, he used a partial baseball scholarship to attend the University of North Carolina at Asheville, where he earned a business degree. He originally was going to become a Major League Baseball player after graduating, but moved to Los Angeles instead to pursue an acting career.

== Career ==
In 1999, he appeared in the supernatural horror films Witchouse and Totem. In 2001, he played Wesley "Wes" Collins, the Red Time Force Ranger and Alex Drake in Power Rangers Time Force. He later reprised the role of Wes in episodes of Power Rangers Wild Force, Super Megaforce, and Super Ninja Steel.

In 2017, he appeared in the film The Order alongside other Power Rangers alumni. He appeared in Resident Evil: Vendetta as the motion capture actor for Leon S. Kennedy and as the voice of Aaron.

== Personal life ==
Faunt has two daughters, Keira and Makayla, with his ex-wife Stephanie. In 2022, he married Angela Lin, and they welcomed their first child together, a daughter, Meiomi in February 2024. On June 28, 2025, they had their son, Gage. He currently resides in Orange County, California with his wife and daughters and son.

== Filmography ==
=== Film ===
Year	Title	Role	Notes
	Honeymoon in Paradise	Mike	
1999	Witchouse	Bob	
1999	Totem	Paul Magila	
2004	Pact	Porter	Short
2007	Jekyll	Bartender	
2013	An Easter Bunny Puppy	Courtney	
2013	A Talking Pony!?!	Mr. Beetle	
2016	Door on the Other Side	Brett	
2016	Bad People	Ben	
2017	The Order	Connor	Short
2017	Beast of the Water	Settler Leader	
2017	Resident Evil: Vendetta	Leon S. Kennedy	Motion capture actor
2017	Resident Evil: Vendetta	Aaron	Voice role
2021	Renegades: Ominara	Reza	
2023	The Stalker Part II	Officer Daniels	
2023	Below Deck Deceit		
2024	The Seductress from Hell	Robert Pereira	
2026	Legend of the White Dragon	Connor Frost	

=== Television ===
Year	Title	Role	Notes
1999	Passions	Carson	1 episode
2000	Port Charles	Kane	2 episodes
2001	Power Rangers Time Force	Alex Drake / Wes Collins – Red Time Force Ranger	Main role, 40 episodes
2001	S Club 7 in Hollywood	Interviewer	Episode: "The Stylist"
2002	Power Rangers Wild Force	Wesley Collins - Red Time Force Ranger	3 episodes: "Reinforcements from the Future: Part 1", "Reinforcements from the Future: Part 2", "Forever Red"
2002	Power Rangers Wild Force	Bulldozer Org	Episode: "Soul Searching", voice role
2003	Eve		Episode: "She Snoops to Conquer"
2005	Battleground: The Art of War	Alexander the Great	Episode: "Alexander the Great"
2010	Deadliest Warrior	Alexander the Great	Episode: "Attila the Hun vs. Alexander the Great"
2014	Power Rangers Super Megaforce	Wesley Collins - Red Time Force Ranger	Episode: "Legendary Battle"
2016	The Wrong Child	Eddie	TV movie
2016	666: Teen Warlock	Mr. Hellion	TV movie
2018	E.L.E.	Chip Torsten	
2018	The Wrong Friend	Detective Jones	TV movie
2018	Power Rangers Super Ninja Steel	Wesley Collins - Red Time Force Ranger	3 episodes: "Outfoxed" (voice only), "Dimensions in Danger", "The Poisy Show" (cameo)
2019	Dystopia	Jack Williams	1 episode
2021	The Wrong Mr. Right	John	TV movie
2022	All American	Bryce	Episode: "Got Your Money"

=== Video games ===
Year	Title	Role	Notes
2001	Power Rangers Time Force	Wesley Collins/Red Time Force Ranger	Voice actor
2012	Resident Evil 6	Leon S. Kennedy	Motion capture actor

=== Producer ===
- Pact (2004)

=== Webseries ===
- No Nerds Here (2014)
