= Power Rangers Wild Force =

Television series

- Genre: Action-adventure; Fantasy; Superhero
- Created by: Haim Saban; Toei Company
- Based on: Hyakujuu Sentai Gaoranger by Toei Company
- Developed by: Saban Entertainment (Note: Episodes 1 to 26); The Walt Disney Company (Note: Episodes 27 to 40); Toei Company
- Directed by: Koichi Sakamoto; Terry Withrow; Worth Keeter; Jonathan Tzachor; Taro Sakamoto
- Starring: See below
- Composers: Lior Rosner; Paul Gordon; Drew DeAscentis
- Countries of origin: United States; Japan
- Original language: English
- No. of episodes: 40

Production
- Producer: Jonathan Tzachor
- Production locations: California (Greater Los Angeles Area) (Santa Clarita & Los Angeles); Japan (Greater Tokyo Area) (Tokyo, Saitama, Yokohama and Kyoto)
- Cinematography: Ilan Rosenberg; Sean McLin
- Running time: 21–22 minutes
- Production companies: BVS Entertainment (Note: Credited as Saban Entertainment in the original broadcast of episodes 1 to 26, and BVS Entertainment in episodes 27 to 40 and re-runs.); Renaissance Atlantic Entertainment; Toei Company; MMPR Productions, Inc.

Original release
- Network: Fox (Fox Kids)
- Release: February 9 – August 10, 2002
- Network: ABC (ABC Kids)
- Release: September 14 – November 16, 2002

Related
- Power Rangers television series

Power Rangers Wild Force is a television series and the tenth entry of Power Rangers. It is also the 10th anniversary season of the Power Rangers franchise, based on the 25th Super Sentai series Hyakujuu Sentai Gaoranger, which itself was the 25th anniversary of Super Sentai.

Power Rangers Wild Force is the last season to be produced by Saban and first by Disney, following the sale of Fox Family Worldwide (renamed ABC Family Worldwide) including Saban Entertainment (renamed BVS Entertainment) to Disney by Haim Saban and News Corporation, Fox's parent company. The first part of the series was originally broadcast from February to August 2002 on the Fox Kids television block. The show was moved in the fall 2002 to ABC's new Saturday morning block, ABC Kids (formerly Disney's One Saturday Morning).

== Plot ==
Three thousand years ago, warriors from the lost world of Animaria battled a race of monsters known as the Orgs. In 2002, the Orgs resurfaced, empowered by humanity's pollution. Princess Shayla, the last survivor of Animaria, on the floating island of Animarium, recruits Cole Evans, Taylor Earhardt, Max Cooper, Danny Delgado and Alyssa Enrilé to form a team of Power Rangers and join forces with the Wild Zords to combat the Orgs once again. During their quest, they encounter Merrick Baliton, an ancient warrior who was transformed into an Org and imprisoned to safeguard the world. Upon his release, he ultimately joins the Rangers in their battle against the Orgs.

== Cast and characters ==
Wild Force Rangers

- Ricardo Medina Jr. as Cole Evans, the Red Lion Ranger.
- Alyson Kiperman as Taylor Earhardt, the Yellow Eagle Ranger.
- Phillip Jeanmarie as Max Cooper, the Blue Shark Ranger.
- Jack Guzman as Danny Delgado, the Black Bison Ranger.
- Jessica Rey as Alyssa Enrilé, the White Tiger Ranger.
- Phillip Andrew as Merrick Baliton, the Lunar Wolf Ranger.

Supporting characters

- Ann Marie Crouch as Princess Shayla
- Charles Gideon Davis as the voice of Animus
- J.D. Hall as Willie

Villains

- Ilia Volok as Ancient/Original and Reincarnated Master Org/Dr. Viktor Adler
- Sin Wong as Toxica
- Richard Cansino as the voice of Jindrax (original)
- Danny Wayne as the voice of Jindrax (later)
- Michael Sorich as the voice of Retinax
- Ken Merckx as the voice of Nayzor
- Ezra Weisz and Barbara Goodson as the voices of Mandilok
- Dan Woren as the voice of Zen-Aku (original) & Onikage
- Lex Lang as the voice of Zen-Aku (later)

Guest stars

- Time Force Rangers
  - Jason Faunt as Wesley "Wes" Collins, the Red Time Force Ranger.
  - Erin Cahill as Jennifer "Jen" Scotts, the Pink Time Force Ranger.
  - Kevin Kleinberg as Trip, the Green Time Force Ranger.
  - Deborah Estelle Philips as Katie Walker, the Yellow Time Force Ranger.
  - Michael Copon as Lucas Kendall, the Blue Time Force Ranger.
  - Daniel Southworth as Eric Myers, the Quantum Ranger.
- Forever Red Rangers
  - Austin St. John as Jason Lee Scott, the first Red Ranger, and previously the second Gold Zeo Ranger.
  - Christopher Glenn as the voice of Aurico, the Red Aquitian Ranger.
  - Jason Frank as Tommy Oliver, the Zeo Ranger V Red and previously the Green Ranger, White Ranger, and the first Red Turbo Ranger.
  - Selwyn Ward as T.J. Johnson, the second Red Turbo Ranger, and previously the Blue Space Ranger.
  - Christopher Khayman Lee as Andros, the Red Space Ranger.
  - Danny Slavin as Leo Corbett, the Red Galaxy Ranger.
  - Sean Cw Johnson as Carter Grayson, the Red Lightspeed Ranger.
- Richard Steven Horvitz as the voice of Alpha 7
- Brianne Siddall as the voice of Circuit
- Vernon Wells as Ransik
- Kate Sheldon as Nadira
- Archie Kao as the voice of General Venjix
- Walter Jones as the voice of Gerrok
- Catherine Sutherland as the voice of Tezzla
- Scott Page-Pagter as the voice of Steelon
- David Walsh as the voice of Automon
- David Lodge as the voice of Takach & Kired
- Kim Strauss as the voice of Rofang

== Episodes ==
No.	Title	Directed by	Written by	Original release date
1	"Lionheart"	Koichi Sakamoto	William Winkler	February 9, 2002
Cole Evans - a young man raised in the jungle by an indigenous tribe from infancy - leaves to search for his destiny, and is given an old photo of himself as a baby with his parents and a red crystal to help on his search. In the city of Turtle Cove, four Power Rangers fight two monsters, Plug Org and Turbine Org, but are outmatched. While searching for his parents, Cole saves animals from a shady shelter run by the Duke Orgs Toxica and Jindrax. The next day, the other Rangers - Taylor Earhardt, Alyssa Enrilé, Max Cooper, and Danny Delgado - find Cole and take him to a floating jungle called the Animarium, where the five Wild Zords - the Lion, Tiger, Bison, Shark, and Eagle Zords - greet him. At a nearby temple, he is greeted by the Rangers and their mentor, Princess Shayla. Cole shows them his red crystal with the lion in it. They surprise him by showing him their colored crystals. The Orgs from earlier return to wreak more havoc in the city. Shayla dispatches the Rangers, and Taylor teaches Cole how to morph with his Growl Phone. After a brief battle, the Rangers combine their weapons into the Jungle Sword, destroying Plug Org. After Toxica grows Turbine Org into a giant, the Wild Zords help the Rangers destroy the org.
2	"Darkness Awakening"	Koichi Sakamoto	Derek Rydall	February 9, 2002
Barbed Wire Org starts to attack the city with his wires and an army of putrids. Jindrax and Toxica find the old org temple inside the Nexus and find Master Org, the leader of all orgs. The Rangers arrive in the city to fight the org, but Cole, believing that violence isn't the answer, and that all living things - even orgs - have hearts, tries to reason with the Org. After he finds out orgs do not have hearts, the Rangers destroy Barbed Wire Org with the Jungle Sword, and he grows to giant size after Jindrax and Toxica make themselves known to the Rangers. The Wild Zords arrive from the Animarium, and the Red Lion tells Cole they need to combine and form the Wild Force Megazord to defeat the org. Afterwards, the Rangers give Cole a make-over, officially making him part of the team.
3	"Click, Click, Zoom"	Koichi Sakamoto	Jill Donnellan	February 16, 2002
Master Org gives Toxica and Jindrax a pep talk in preparation for his next plan of conquest. Cole reads Taylor's Ranger rule book but says the one rule should be teamwork. A frustrated Taylor notices a woman telling her child about the Animarium, while Shayla simultaneously tells the same story to the Rangers. Meanwhile, Camera Org surfaces and makes everyone invisible with a single click. Taylor fights Jindrax until Camera Org makes Taylor invisible, prompting the other Rangers to take her back to the Animarium. Cole, feeling guilty for insulting Taylor about the rules, breaks his own rule of teamwork to fight Camera Org, while Alyssa, Danny, and Max battle the Putrids. Cole tricks Camera Org and gets his film, restoring everyone's visibility. Taylor meets up with the Rangers, and Cole uses his new Lion Blaster to weaken the org. After a Megazord battle, Taylor reconciles with Cole, accepting him as the new leader.
4	"Never Give Up!"	Terry Withrow	Katherine Torpey	February 23, 2002
Max reads the newspaper and suggests that he and Danny check out a haunted temple to see if it has an org. Due to Danny's distractions with his crush, Kendall, Max personally visits the temple. While there, Bell Org arrives and traps him in one of his bells. Meanwhile, Danny feels guilty for breaking his promise of loyalty, and explains to the other Rangers how Max helped him cope with his fear of heights since he saved him from falling during a previous chase after Turbine Org. As the Rangers fight Bell Org, Danny rescues Max from inside the bell and they reconcile. The two regroup with the other Rangers and defeat the org.
5	"Ancient Awakening"	Terry Withrow	Suzi Shimoyama	March 2, 2002
On an archaeological dig, Alyssa secretly hears a trumpet and finds a glowing Wild Force emblem inside a cave. Later, she, Shayla, and Cole check it out, but are attacked by Tire Org, who kidnaps Shayla. The Rangers chase after Tire Org with the power animals' savage cycles, rescuing Shayla and destroying the Org. Later, as the rangers fight the revived Org in the Wild Force Megazord, Master Org tries forcing Shayla to open the seal, prompting Alyssa to give chase. After learning that only the chosen one can open the seal, Master Org destroys it. Inspecting the rubble, Shayla and Alyssa find that the Power Animal behind the seal still lives. An animal crystal appears before Alyssa and summons the Elephant Zord, forming the Wild Force Megazord's Sword and Shield Mode to destroy Tire Org.
6	"Wishes on the Water"	Koichi Sakamoto	William Winkler	March 9, 2002
Alyssa reads a story to Max and Danny about a creature in Turtle Lake that can grant wishes. Max falls asleep and dreams about the Megazord getting defeated. Wishing the others would stop referring to him as a child, Max uses the book's instructions to conceal a written message in the bottle and throw it into a lake. That night, the Rangers fight Ship Org, who stole Max's bottle and knocks him out. The other Rangers take Max back to the Animarium, where he experiences the same dream, and is told to "use the Spear of Pardolis." He confides in Shayla and then returns to fight and destroy Ship Org with the other Rangers. After Toxica revives Ship Org, Max's dream becomes a reality when the org overpowers the Elephant Zord, and Shayla remembers that Pardolis was an ancient Animarium warrior who controlled the Giraffe Zord, his spear. Max summons the Giraffe Zord to form the Wild Force Megazord's Spear Mode to destroy Ship Org.
7	"The Bear Necessities"	Koichi Sakamoto	Derek Rydall	March 16, 2002
When jogging, Taylor visits the air force base and remembers when she first came to the Animarium. She then meets and rescues two boys fleeing from a security guard, and encounters Cellphone Org attacking the city and disrupts the Rangers' morphing powers by jamming the cellular frequency. He injures Taylor, who flees to an abandoned factory and encounters a group of Putrids. As the other Rangers fight Cellphone Org, the boys task Taylor to obtain two flowers from a cliff. The others break Cellphone Org's antenna, allowing Taylor to use her powers to get the flowers. The boys give her two seeds, and she then returns to the others to destroy Cellphone Org. Toxica revives him into a giant, and the Rangers struggle, until the boys reveal themselves to be the Black Bear and Polar Bear Zords. The rangers combine the bear zords with the Wild Force Megazord to form Double Knuckle mode and destroy Cellphone Org. However, the Red Lion Zord suddenly becomes exhausted from taking in the bear zords' energy, causing the Megazord to disengage.
8	"Soul Searching"	Koichi Sakamoto	Jill Donnellan	March 23, 2002
After learning of a magical Soul Bird in the forest that can heal the Wild Zords, including the Red Lion, the rangers search for it. However, they are stopped by Toxica, Jindrax, and a grown Bulldozer Org. Despite still being exhausted, the Red Lion insists on fighting, but when the Rangers need to use the Bear Zords again, the Red Lion becomes further exhausted. The other Wild Zords try protecting him while Cole searches for the Soul Bird, during which Cole encounters Master Org, who remembers a memory of his past upon seeing Cole's picture of his parents. Just as Master Org scares off the Soul Bird, a new animal crystal then comes to Cole, who uses it to summon the Gorilla Zord and form the Kongazord to defeat Bulldozer Org. Afterwards, the Rangers find a Soul Bird egg, and Cole becomes sad because the little chick will not know its mother like him.
9	"Soul Bird Salvation"	Worth Keeter	Suzi Shimoyama	March 30, 2002
A wandering General Org called Retinax battles the Rangers to prove his worth. With Freezer Org's help and sacrifice, the Kongazord and the Rangers' Growl Phones are frozen, forcing them to fight without their zords or morphing powers. The Soul Bird hatches, thaws the Zords and Growlphones, and helps the Rangers defeat Retinax.
10	"Curse of the Wolf"	Taro Sakamoto	Katherine Torpey	April 6, 2002
Master Org releases the General Org Nayzor for a mission; while the Rangers get distracted by Vacuum Cleaner Org. Nayzor finds and releases the werewolf Duke Org, Zen-Aku, who defeats the Rangers and steals the Elephant Zord from Alyssa.
11	"Battle of the Zords"	Koichi Sakamoto	Derek Rydall	April 13, 2002
An injured and disheartened Alyssa leaves to find what happened to the Elephant Zord, but is attacked by Jindrax and Toxica. She is subsequently tended to by Zen-Aku, who summons a trio of Dark Wild Zords (consisting of the Wolf, Hammerhead Shark and Alligator Zords) to battle the Rangers' Wild Zords.
12	"Predazord, Awaken"	Koichi Sakamoto	Bergen Williams	April 20, 2002
As Cole takes on Zen-Aku, the others take on Bus Org who disguised himself as a bus which they had to free the passengers from. After defeating the Bus Org, the Rangers face Zen-Aku, who combines his Dark Wild Zords into the Predazord and steals the Giraffe Zord from Max.
13	"Revenge of Zen-Aku"	Koichi Sakamoto	Jill Donnellan	April 27, 2002
Zen-Aku frees Motorcycle Org and kidnaps Shayla. It seems that back in Taylor's past, she could not defeat Motorcycle Org and Shayla had to seal him away with a spell. Shayla's necklace brings back memories for Zen-Aku. The Rangers battle Motorcycle Org and Zen-Aku and rescue the Princess. After the Motorcycle Org is destroyed, Zen-Aku summons the Predazord to defeat the Kongazord. Taylor is defeated by Zen-Aku, who steals the Bear animal crystals.
14	"Identity Crisis"	Taro Sakamoto	Suzi Shimoyama	May 4, 2002
As Zen-Aku begins remembering his past, Nayzor plants a bug in his head, which mind controls him, making him even more dangerous to the Rangers. This is unlikely proven when he crashes the Rangers' battle with Lawnmower Org and destroys him.
15	"The Ancient Warrior"	Taro Sakamoto	Katherine Torpey	May 11, 2002
The ancient Animus intervenes to reveal Zen-Aku's true identity - Merrick Baliton, the ancient warrior who defeated Master Org by using the cursed wolf mask. By defeating the Predazord with new zords (the Rhinoceros and Armadillo Wild Zords), the Rangers break the curse, returning Merrick to normal.
16	"The Lone Wolf"	Taro Sakamoto	Derek Rydall	May 18, 2002
After failing to retrieve the stolen Animal Crystals, Merrick must fight the Quadra Org, a Chimera-type Org who was created with the power of the crystals. With the Rangers tied up, Merrick battles on his own until his Wild Zords return to him and give him the power to morph into the Lunar Wolf Ranger. After Quadra Org is destroyed, Merrick destroys Nayzor and gives the stolen crystals back to the Rangers, but refuses to join the team.
17	"Power Play"	Koichi Sakamoto	Jill Donnellan	June 1, 2002
Toxica secretly powers herself up into a new General Org - Necronomica. This puts her into conflict with Jindrax, even when he finds Karaoke Org. Merrick helps the Rangers defeat her and Karaoke Org with his new Savage Cycle.
18	"Secrets and Lies"	Koichi Sakamoto	Bergen Williams	June 8, 2002
Jindrax finds Master Org zapping Toxica for using the Org Crown on herself. After being persuaded by Jindrax not to destroy her, Master Org orders the two to find another Org. Signal Org makes Cole lose his memory. He ends up on a farm, but is eventually found by the Rangers and returned to normal to defeat Signal Org. Following Signal Org's destruction, Toxica and Jindrax explore Master Org's chamber based on Toxica's suspicions that he may be human. However, Master Org catches them and using his vines transforms Toxica and Jindrax into more powerful forms as well as brainwashing them into being completely loyal to him. Later, Cole learns that his parents have died.
19	"The Tornado Spin"	Worth Keeter	Derek Rydall	June 15, 2002
Bowling Org makes Max learn a new bowling technique, the tornado spin. To learn the move, he must convince his old bowling coach to regain his will to bowl.
20	"Three's a Crowd"	Taro Sakamoto	Katherine Torpey & Bergen Williams	June 29, 2002
Danny competes for Kendall's affection while the Rangers try to find Wedding Dress Org and his captives. When the org tries abducting Kendall, Danny is forced to reveal his identity as the Black Ranger to protect her. Kendall inspires him to turn the tide against the Org single-handedly, but in the end, Danny's life does not allow them to be together.
21	"A Father's Footsteps"	Koichi Sakamoto	Suzi Shimoyama	July 6, 2002
Alyssa's father is in town and calls Alyssa for lunch. Meanwhile, Samurai Org stirs up trouble and Alyssa must recall her father's training to defeat him.
22	"Sing Song"	Taro Sakamoto	Jill Donnellan	July 13, 2002
To defeat Tombstone Org, who was created by Master Org by infusing the tombstone of Dr. Viktor Adler with six Org spirits, the Rangers need the Deer Zord. To get the Deer to help them, Shayla and Merrick must sing for him to make him happy again following an old misunderstanding the Zord has with Merrick.
23	"The Wings of Animaria"	Worth Keeter	Suzi Shimoyama	July 20, 2002
Nayzor is resurrected as Super Nayzor, who severely injures Taylor, Alyssa, Max and Danny, leaving Cole and Merrick to defeat him. Meanwhile, the other four rangers dream of being in a dark dimension, being instructed by a mysterious boy to solve a wooden puzzle to unleash a new Wild Zord, the Falcon Zord, and help Cole. The four solve it before time expires, allowing Cole to use the Falcon Summoner to destroy Super Nayzor. While fighting Toxica and Jindrax, Cole becomes the Red Savage Warrior with his new Animarium Armor to restore the Duke Orgs to their normal forms. They then abandon Master Org, determined to find someone to help them take down the impostor. When Master Org makes him grow, Super Nayzor is destroyed by the Rangers' new Megazord, the Isis Megazord which consists of the Deer, the Giraffe, the Rhino, the Armadillo and the Falcon Zords.
24	"Reinforcements from the Future"	Koichi Sakamoto	Amit Bhaumik	July 27, 2002
25	"Reinforcements from the Future"	Koichi Sakamoto	Amit Bhaumik	August 3, 2002
Time Force Rangers Wes Collins and Eric Myers track down three MutOrgs - Orgs who copied mutant DNA from Ransik in 3000 - to Turtle Cove, where they team up with the Wild Force Rangers to battle them. The MutOrgs are incredibly overpowered, and only with the intervention of Jen are the Rangers able to escape. The MutOrgs managed to find their way to Master Org. The four remaining Time Force Rangers later arrive from the future, bringing Ransik and Nadira with them. They track down the MutOrgs and Ransik destroys their mutant halves, allowing the 12 Rangers to destroy the trio. Afterwards, the Rangers find that Ransik is now human. Guest stars: Erin Cahill, Michael Copon, Jason Faunt, Kevin Kleinberg, Deborah Estelle Philips, Kate Sheldon, Daniel Southworth and Vernon Wells.
26	"The Master's Last Stand"	Koichi Sakamoto	Derek Rydall	August 10, 2002
Posing as his original form of Viktor Adler upon him being found, Master Org kidnaps four of the Rangers and reveals his true origin to Cole, telling him that he is the one who killed his parents. In the ensuing battle, Cole destroys Master Org's Org half, reverting him to his human form. Meanwhile, Toxica and Jindrax have found a replacement to lead them; the treacherous General Org Mandilok, who drops Viktor Alder from a cliff and leaves him for dead. However, he comes back to life when an Org horn appears on his head; hinting Master Org's nearly complete resurrection.
27	"Unfinished Business"	Taro Sakamoto	Suzi Shimoyama	September 14, 2002
Zen-Aku returns to rejoin with Merrick, who refuses to let the other Rangers help him. Only by learning to accept help from his friends does Merrick defeat this evil from his past.
28	"Homecoming"	Taro Sakamoto	Katherine Torpey	September 14, 2002
Cole befriends a mysterious young boy named Kite, who helps them defeat Mandilok's two new Duke Orgs, Artilla and Helicos.
29	"The Flute"	Worth Keeter	Katherine Torpey	September 21, 2002
Flute Org is playing music on his flute to controls the Turtle Cove's citizens and the Rangers, even after disrupting Princess Shayla and Merrick's morning song to the Deer Zord. When the Rangers struggle to defeat him, a surprising ally comes to their rescue; Animus.
30	"Team Carnival"	Koichi Sakamoto	Katherine Torpey	September 21, 2002
Jindrax teams up with his org brother, Juggelo, to prove his worth by destroying the Rangers, even going so far as to risk his life growing giant to help Juggelo. After his brother is killed, Jindrax narrowly escapes.
31	"Taming of the Zords"	Koichi Sakamoto	Katherine Torpey	September 28, 2002
The Rangers battle for control of the Wild Zords against Lion Tamer Org, who controls the Wild Force Megazord and the Kongazord with his whip. The Zords are broken free of the Org's spell by Kite, who displays some mysterious powers; leading to the Isis Megazord defeating Lion Tamer Org.
32	"Monitoring Earth"	Taro Sakamoto	Katherine Torpey	September 28, 2002
Mandilok tricks Kite into thinking that humans do not deserve the Rangers' help before dispatching Monitor Org to fight them. Just as the Rangers defeat Monitor Org, Kite reveals himself as Animus and breaks off the control device that Jindrax and Toxica placed on the Wild Force Megazord. Later, Animus personally takes the Wild Zords.
33	"The Soul of Humanity"	Taro Sakamoto	Katherine Torpey	October 5, 2002
The Rangers struggle to defeat Toy Org without their Zords and tell Mandilok of their commitment to protect the Earth from the Orgs, Animus combines his powers with Merrick to help the Rangers destroy Toy Org. Revealing himself as the boy who helped the other Rangers obtain Cole's Falcon Zord, Animus tells the Rangers he took the Zords away as a test to see their virtues. He returns the Zords to the Rangers for good and gives Cole his Wild Force Rider.
34	"Forever Red"	Koichi Sakamoto	Amit Bhaumik	October 5, 2002
Cole and nine other Red Rangers from the previous series unite to destroy the remaining generals of the Machine Empire who are excavating Serpentera. Guest stars: Jason Faunt, Jason David Frank, Sean Cw Johnson, Christopher Khayman Lee, Jason Narvy, Paul Schrier, Danny Slavin, Daniel Southworth, Austin St. John and Selwyn Ward.
35	"The Master's Herald"	Koichi Sakamoto	Jill Donnelllan	October 19, 2002
36	"The Master's Herald"	Koichi Sakamoto	Jill Donnelllan	October 19, 2002
To prepare for his return, Master Org summons the ninja Duke Org Onikage to take care of business. Onikage succeeds in kidnapping Shayla and destroys Toxica, and then creates Shadow Rangers to fight the Rangers. Master Org reappears and destroys Mandilok. The Pegasus Megazord destroys Onikage, but Master Org walks off with the Princess.
37	"Fishing for a Friend"	Taro Sakamoto	Suzi Shimoyama	November 2, 2002
Jindrax, having lost all faith in Orgs after Toxica's fall because of Master Org's manipulations and Mandilok's coldness, sets up both the Rangers and the Locomotive Org to re-energize Toxica's horn, which he uses to fish her out of the Org Spirit World. Meanwhile, Master Org prepares the Nexus for a mysterious ceremony and steals Princess Shayla's necklace for it.
38	"Sealing the Nexus"	Taro Sakamoto	Derek Rydall	November 2, 2002
The Rangers battle the resurrected Retinax, Nayzor, and Mandilok to disable the Nexus's force field so that their new allies Toxica and Jindrax may secretly rescue Shayla. The three escape as Master Org consumes the Org Heart and the Nexus subsequently collapses.
39	"The End of the Power Rangers"	Jonathan Tzachor	Jill Donnellan & Katherine Torpey	November 16, 2002
40	"The End of the Power Rangers"	Jonathan Tzachor	Derek Rydall & Suzi Shimoyama	November 16, 2002
Following the Nexus's destruction, Master Org returns and attacks the Rangers with his new form. He destroys the Wild Zords, including Animus, as well as the Rangers' powers. The Wild Zords later return, along with other fallen Wild Zords, and kill Master Org with an Ultra Roar. The Rangers then destroy the Org Heart for good. With Turtle Cove saved, the Rangers go their separate ways.
