= Ezra Weisz =

American voice actor

- Other name: Ethan Murray
- Occupations: Voice actor, ADR director
- Notable credits: Outlaw Star as Fred Luo; Power Rangers: Wild Force as Mandilok (male voice); JoJo's Bizarre Adventure: Golden Wind as Pannacotta Fugo; Vampire Knight as Kaname Kuran; Rave Master as Schneider; Scryed as Grow
- Spouse: Sabrina Hill (m. 1998)
- Children: 2

Ezra Weisz is an American voice actor and ADR director who stars in various anime television shows.

== Career ==
Weisz has done voices in various anime shows such as Outlaw Star, The Big O, Rave Master, and Scryed. He is also known for his past voice work in Saban live-action shows.

Some of his better known-roles there included Mantix (who was one of the dreaded Mantrons) in Beetleborgs Metallix, as well as Falkar (who was one of the three Fallen Angel, or Troika, demons) in Power Rangers: Lightspeed Rescue, and also the male voice of the Org General named Mandilok in Power Rangers: Wild Force (which was the last Power Rangers series to be filmed in America before it moved to New Zealand in 2003; the move laid off much of the original PR crew, including Weisz). Since then, his main focus has been anime. He co-directed the ADR for Bobobo-bo Bo-bobo alongside voice actor Michael Sorich. He is also the live-audience coach for Disney Channel shows, helping the teen and child stars with them with improvisation on the set.

== Personal life ==
Since 1998, Weisz has been married to Sabrina Hill. They have two children, Sarah and Jacob.

== Filmography ==
=== Anime ===
- Arc the Lad – Clive
- Aldnoah.Zero – Soma Yagarai
- The Big O – Preview Narrator, Phil (Ep. 16)
- Blade of the Immortal – Kagehisa Anotsu
- BlazBlue Alter Memory – Nago
- Bleach – Yylfordt Granz
- Code Geass: Lelouch of the Rebellion – Mao
- Di Gi Charat – Takuro Kimura
- Fushigi Yûgi – Kouji
- Gad Guard – Takenaka
- Gankutsuou: The Count of Monte Cristo – Baron Franz D'Épinay
- Ghost in the Shell: Stand Alone Complex – Guru Guru
- Green Green – Hikaru Ichiban-Boshi
- Heat Guy J – Mitchal Rubinstein
- JoJo's Bizarre Adventure: Golden Wind – Pannacotta Fugo
- Hunter × Hunter 2011 series – Wing
- Kanokon – Tayura Minamoto
- Magi: The Kingdom of Magic – Ren Koumei
- Magic Knight Rayearth – Kakeru Shido, Umi's Father
- Mazinkaiser SKL – Ken Kaido
- Naruto – Kikunojou
- Naruto Shippuden – Suname, Nurari
- New Getter Robo – Debt Collector
- Outlaw Star – Fred Luo, Gene Starwind (Young)
- Planetes – Gennojo (Ep. 6)
- Rave Master – Schneider
- Rurouni Kenshin – Mr. Santou, Seiku Arai, Traveler
- Samurai Champloo – Hishikawa Moronobu
- Scryed – Grow
- A Little Snow Fairy Sugar – Basil, Turmeric
- Sword Art Online: Alicization – Eldrie Synthesis Thirty-One
- Tenjho Tenge – Fu Chen
- Ultra Maniac – Host Father, Sebastian
- Vampire Knight series – Kaname Kuran
- X – Yūto Kigai
- Zenki – Mango

=== Animation ===
- Popples – Gruffman, Coach Loudly
- Miraculous: Tales of Ladybug & Cat Noir – Fred Haprele, Adrien's Bodyguard/Gorilla, Simon Grimault, Théo Barbot (Season 2), André, The Ice Cream maker, Ray Pugnant (Note: Weisz is also the English dub director for the show)

=== Films ===
- Akira – Additional Voices (Animaze dub)
- Hunter × Hunter: The Last Mission – Wing
- Lu over the Wall – Teruo
- Miss Hokusai – Zenjirō Ikeda
- Paprika – Him (Konakawa's friend)
- Winx Club 3D:Magical Adventure – King Oritel

=== Live action ===
- Adventures in Voice Acting – Himself
- Beetleborgs Metallix – Changeling, Mantix (voices, credited as Ethan Murray)
- Big Bad Beetleborgs – Lottamuggs, Cyber-Serpent (voices), Green Cannon Machine (2nd voice)
- Masked Rider – Reptosect, Brain Mite (voices)
- Power Rangers in Space – Fearog, Body Switcher, Destructoid (as Ethan Murray), Lizwizard (voices, uncredited)
- Power Rangers: Lightspeed Rescue – Falkar, Troika (voices)
- Power Rangers: Lost Galaxy – Wisewizard (voice, uncredited)
- Power Rangers: Time Force – Tentaclaw (voice)
- Power Rangers: Turbo – Mouthpiece, Numbor, Lord Litter (voices, uncredited)
- Power Rangers: Wild Force – Mandilok (male voice)
- Power Rangers: Zeo – Leaky Faucet, Admiral Abominator (voices, uncredited)
- VR Troopers – Silkoid, Duplitronic (voices)

=== Video games ===
- Master Detective Archives: Rain Code - Icardi
- Pokémon Masters - Molayne
- Star Ocean: First Departure – Ioshua Jerand

== Production credits ==
=== Voice director ===
- 86
- B: The Beginning
- Bobobo-bo Bo-bobo
- Bottle Fairy
- The Jungle Bunch
- Legend of the Millennium Dragon
- A Little Snow Fairy Sugar
- ‘’Megalobox’’
- Miraculous: Tales of Ladybug & Cat Noir
- Nanga Parbat (2010)
- Paprika
- Popples
- Radiata Stories
- The Sky Crawlers
- Ultra Maniac
- Wild Arms XF
- Zak Storm
