= Michael Sorich =

American actor (born 1958)

- Born: Michael John Sorich; March 23, 1958 (age 68); California
- Occupations: Actor; director; writer
- Years active: 1979–present

Michael John Sorich (/ˈsoʊrɪtʃ/ SOH-ritch, born March 23, 1958) is an American actor, writer and director.

== Biography ==
Sorich has been a voice actor for many different characters in the Power Rangers franchise (until the end of the Wild Force series), as well as related or similar Saban series such as Masked Rider, VR Troopers, and Big Bad Beetleborgs/Beetleborgs Metallix. Some of his roles included the voices of Squatt in Mighty Morphin Power Rangers, Decimator and Zelton in VR Troopers, Roboborg in Beetleborgs Metallix, and Double Face in Masked Rider. He has also had some on-screen roles, such as Woody Stocker on VR Troopers.

Sorich had voice roles in the anime series Bleach. He directed the dubs for Idaten Jump and for Bobobo-bo Bo-bobo. He had also co-directed the ADR for VR Troopers with Scott Page-Pagter and Wendee Lee.

== Filmography ==
=== Anime ===
- Armitage III – Train Driver
- Arte – Ubertino
- Ayakashi Ayashi: Ayashi Divine Comedy – Prisoner, Tamahei
- Bakuto Sengen Daigunder – Daigunder
- Battle Athletes Victory – Ando
- Battle B-Daman – Vinnie, Additional Voices
- Baki – The Announcer
- Black Jack – Various
- Black Magic M-66 – Additional Voices
- Bleach – Don Kanonji, Tessai Tsukabishi, Giriko Kutsuzawa, Fishbone D, Unnamed Soul
- Blue Dragon – Hippopotamus
- Bobobo-bo Bo-bobo – Additional Voices
- Carried by the Wind: Tsukikage Ran – Daigoro Okuma
- Casshan: Robot Hunter – Additional Voices
- Chainsmoker Cat - Oya Otani/Landlord
- Code Geass: Lelouch of the Rebellion – Store Owner
- Coppelion – Kamata
- Cosmo Warrior Zero – Rai
- Cowboy Bebop – Giraffe
- Crimson Wolf – Additional Voices
- Cutie Honey – Various
- Cyborg 009 – Great Britain/Cyborg 007
- Daigunder – Daigu/Daigunder
- Digimon Adventure – Andromon, Zudomon, Elecmon, Evil Greymon, Tyrannomon, DarkTyrannomon
- Digimon Adventure 02 – Zudomon, Andromon, Gennai (Jose), Tyrannomon, DarkTyrannomon
- Digimon Tamers – Vikaralamon, Dobermon, Sinduramon's Possessed Owl
- Digimon Frontier – Elecmon, SkullSatamon, Neemon, Doggymon, Pandamon
- Digimon Fusion – Deputymon, Damemon, Deckerdramon, Monitamon Elder, Machinedramon
- Dinozaurs – Dragozaur Army Forces
- Dorohedoro – Vaux
- Durarara!! – Asanuma, Additional Voices
- Duel Masters – Benny Haha
- Early Reins – Boss
- El-Hazard – Mr. Masamichi Fujisawa
- éX-Driver – Yamazaki
- Eyeshield 21 – Additional Voices
- Final Fantasy Girl Rescue Me: Mave-chan – Forgetter
- Final Fantasy: Legend of the Crystals – Ra Devil/Deatrh Gynos
- Flag – Nadi Olowakandi
- Flint the Time Detective – Lynx, Ominito, Young Babe Ruth (ep. 11)
- Galerians – Drug Dealer, Guard A, Guy in Lobby, Maniac Terrorist, Priest, Researcher A
- Ghost in the Shell: Stand Alone Complex – Nanao's Classmate
- Ghost in the Shell: Stand Alone Complex 2nd Gig – Additional Voices
- Ghost Slayers Ayashi – Bodyguard, Man, Merchant, Tamahei
- Golgo 13: Queen Bee – Bernard
- Great Pretender – Danny
- Great Teacher Onizuka – Committeeman A, Hiramatsu, Masked Man, Mizushima, Police Chief, Yakuza
- Grimm's Fairy Tale Classics – Various
- Gungrave – Norton, Widge
- Gun Sword – Nero
- Hand Maid May – Commando-Z
- Honeybee Hutch – Additional Voices
- Hunter × Hunter 2011 series – Tonpa
- Inazuma Eleven: Ares – Chester Horse
- Jin Jin – Various
- JoJo's Bizarre Adventure: Diamond is Unbreakable – Ryohei Higashikata
- Jujutsu Kaisen – Jogo
- Jungle de Ikou! – Additional Voices
- Kekkaishi – Lord Uro
- Kill la Kill – Barazo Mankanshoku
- Last Exile – Additional Voices
- Lily C.A.T. – Jimmy Hengel
- Lupin III Part II – Olivera Net
- Lupin III Part V – Camille Bardot
- Lycoris Recoil - Abe
- MÄR – Kaldea's Grand Elder
- Marmalade Boy – Rihito Sakuma, Sakurai
- Mars Daybreak – Doctor
- Mazikaiser SKL – Kiba
- Mirmo! – Hanzo
- Mobile Suit Gundam Unicorn – Otto Mitas
- Mob Psycho 100 – Dimple
- Mon Colle Knights – Tanaka
- Monster – Bartender, Mr. Fortner
- Mushrambo – Darba, Robot Cop
- Naruto – Gamabunta, Choza Akimichi, Jirobo, Black Zetsu
- Naruto: Shippuden – Gamabunta, Choza Akimichi, Jirobo
- Nippon Sangoku – Aterui Kura
- The Noozles – Additional Voices
- Outlaw Star – Mata, McCoy, Warden
- Phoenix – Additional Voices
- Planetes – Jiraiya, Tarobo, Temara
- Pluto – Inspector Tawashi
- Rave Master – Cheeks
- Reign: The Conqueror – Bessus, Zariwari
- Robotech – Sparks
- Sailor Moon – Grandpa Hino (Viz Media dub)
- Sailor Moon Crystal – Master Pharaoh 90 (Episodes 27 & 32)
- Crayon Shin-chan (Phuuz dub) – Lucky
- Shinzo – Additional Voices
- Speed Racer X – Additional Voices
- Street Fighter II V – Zangief, Mr. Masters (Animaze Dub)
- Submarine 707R – Youhei Hayami
- Super Pig – Ken Carlen
- Tenchi Muyo! – Kamidake (TV2, Movie 3, and OVA 3), Kazuhiko Amagasaki (TV2)
- Tenjho Tenge – Wutan
- The Legend of Heroes: Trails of Cold Steel – Northern War – Giliath Osborne
- Tribe Nine – Tenshin Otori
- The Twelve Kingdoms – Itan
- Vampire Princess Miyu – Chang, Captain
- Wowser – Additional Voices
- X – Additional Voices
- Ys – Dogi
- YS-II – Dogi
- Yo-kai Watch – Whisper
- Yukikaze – Operator
- Zatch Bell! – Garza
- Zenki – Sohma Miki, Enno Ozuno
- Zetman – Detective Sayama (as Michael McKay)

=== Live action ===
- Big Bad Beetleborgs – Mums (1st voice), Grenade Guy/Super Grenade Guy
- Beetleborgs Metallix – Roboborg
- Hollywood's Amazing Animal Actors – Narrator
- Idaten – Avery Brundage
- Mad Scientist Toon Club – Dr. Pi
- Married... with Children – Fidel Castro
- Masked Rider – Double Face, Fluffy (voice minus Doubleface uncredited)
- Mighty Morphin Power Rangers – Squatt (as Michael J. Sorich), Pineoctopus, Terror Toad, Fang, Polluticorn, Pumpkin Rapper, Saliguana (2nd voice), Magnet Brain, Silver Horns, Pachinko Head, Double Face, Vampirus, Hate Master, Crabby Cabbie, Erik and Merrick the Barbaric Brothers (all minus Squatt are uncredited)
- Power Rangers: Zeo – Squatt (credited, as Michael J. Sorich), Boohoo the Clown, Wrecking Ball, Tough Tusks, Cog Changer (uncredited)
- Power Rangers: Turbo – Voltmeister, Shrinkasect (uncredited)
- Power Rangers: In Space – Elephantitan, Crocotoxes (uncredited)
- Power Rangers: Lost Galaxy – Teksa (2nd appearance), Hardtochoke (2nd appearance), Quakemaker (uncredited 1st time, credited 2nd time)
- Power Rangers: Lightspeed Rescue – Triskull, Gatekeeper, Bird Bane
- Power Rangers: Time Force – "Mohawked Mutant" (uncredited), Brickneck
- Power Rangers: Wild Force – Retinax, Artilla, Camera Org, Locomotive Org
- Power Rangers: Lost Galaxy – Auctioneer
- Seinfeld – Fidel Castro
- The Prince of Light: The Legend of Ramayana – Hanuman
- VR Troopers – Woody Stocker, Decimator, Horrorbot, Tankatron, Vacbot, Zelton, Spitbot (substitute voice), Slice Swordbot Brother (first voice)
- You Can't Hurry Love – Drug Dealer

=== Animation ===
- Creepy Crawlers – Additional Voices
- Huntik: Secret and Seekers – Master Tantras
- Iznogoud – Various
- Little Mouse on the Prairie – Cal, Osgood
- The Magic Snowflake – Santa Claus, Contrary Santa
- The Return of Dogtanian – Athos
- The Nutcracker and the Mouse King – Additional Voices
- Pucca: Love Recipe – Dong King
- Santa's Apprentice – Santa Claus, Nightmare Santa, Inspector Stevens, Contrary Santa (US English version)
- Tenko and the Guardians of the Magic – Jason, Steel
- What the Bleep Do We Know!? – Various Character Voices
- Willy Fog 2 – Various
- Wisdom of the Gnomes – Pat

=== Film ===
- Bigfoot Family – Wilbur the Bear
- The SpongeBob Movie: Sponge on the Run – Additional Voices
- 009 Re:Cyborg – 006/Chang Changku
- Akira – Various
- Appleseed – Bar Troublemaker, Elder, Soldier
- Case Closed: The Fist of Blue Sapphire – Hiroshi Agasa
- Castle in the Sky – Additional Voices
- Catnapped! The Movie – Additional Voices
- Child of Kamiari Month – Ryūjin, additional voices
- Curious George – Seen It Cab Driver
- Digimon: The Movie – Miko, Big Agumon, Gargomon
- Digimon: Island of Lost Digimon – Neemon
- Digimon Adventure tri. – Zudomon, Vikemon, Elecmon, Omnimon
- Digimon Adventure (standalone dub) - Big Agumon, Miko
- Digimon Adventure: Our War Game! (standalone dub) - Miko
- Digimon Adventure 02: Digimon Hurricane Touchdown!! / Transcendent Evolution! The Golden Digimentals (standalone dub) - Gargomon
- Gen^{13} – Additional Voices
- Lu Over the Wall – Chairman
- Mia and the Migoo – Additional Voices
- Resident Evil: Degeneration – Senator Ron Davis
- Rusty: A Dog's Tale – Additional voices
- Scooby-Doo 2: Monsters Unleashed – Tar Monster, Cotton Candy Glob
- Street Fighter II: The Animated Movie – Dhalsim (as Don Carey), Zangief (as William Johnson)
- The Cockpit – Okiumi
- The Smurfs and the Magic Flute – Papa Smurf (2nd American dub)/Hefty Smurf
- The Son of Bigfoot – Wilbur the Bear
- The Swan Princess: A Fairy Tale Is Born – King William
- The Toy Warrior – Ciao and Happy Watch
- Unico in the Island of Magic – Melvin the Magnificat

=== Video games ===
- Binary Domain – Additional voices
- D4: Dark Dreams Don't Die – Derek Buchanan
- Detective Pikachu Returns – Brandon Barnes
- Diablo III – Additional Voices
- Diablo III: Reaper of Souls – Additional Voices
- Dirge of Cerberus: Final Fantasy VII – Incidental characters
- Final Fantasy Type-0 HD – Additional voices
- Final Fantasy XIII – Cocoon Inhabitants
- Fire Emblem Awakening – Vaike
- Fire Emblem: Three Houses – Gwendal
- Fire Emblem Warriors: Three Hopes – Gwendal
- Grim Fandango – Don Copal
- Heroes of the Storm – Falstad Wildhammer
- Heroes of Might and Magic III: The Restoration of Erathia – Uncredited roles
- Jade Cocoon: Story of the Tamamayu – Village Chieftain
- Master Detective Archives: Rain Code – Dr. Huesca
- Naruto: Ultimate Ninja Storm – Gamabunta
- Octopath Traveler – Additional voices
- Romancing SaGa 2: Revenge of the Seven – Harold
- Sengoku Basara: Samurai Heroes – Yoshitsugu Otani, Harumasa Nanbu
- Shenmue III – Additional Cast
- Silent Bomber – Mercury
- Star Ocean: Second Evolution – Regis
- Star Wars Episode I: Racer – Mawhonic, Teemto Pagalies
- Star Wars: X-Wing Alliance – Rebel Pilot
- Stonekeep – Skuz
- Street Fighter IV series – Gen
- Street Fighter V – Gen
- The Bard's Tale – Additional voices
- The Curse of Monkey Island – Edward Van Helgen, Charles DeGoulash the Ghost Groom
- The Legend of Heroes: Trails of Cold Steel IV – Chancellor Giliath Osborne
- Towa and the Guardians of the Sacred Tree – Tanzo
- Twisted Metal Black – Billy Ray Stillwell (Junkyard Dog)
- World of Warcraft: Cataclysm – Falstad Wildhammer, Kurdran Wildhammer, numerous others.
- World of Warcraft: Warlords of Draenor – Additional voices

== Staff work ==
=== Script adaptation ===
- Bleach
- Bob in a Bottle
- Bumpety Boo
- Dinozaurs
- Droners
- Duel Masters
- Dynamo Duck
- Flag
- Honeybee Hutch
- Idaten Jump
- Iznogoud
- Jin Jin and the Panda Patrol
- The Littl' Bits
- Little Mouse on the Prairie
- Maya the Bee
- Mon Colle Knights
- The Noozles
- Ox Tales
- Power Rangers Super Samurai
- Rave Master
- The Return of Dogtanian
- Saban's Adventures of the Little Mermaid
- Saban's Adventures of Peter Pan
- Saban's Adventures of Pinocchio
- Sailor Moon (Viz Media dub)
- Sandokan
- Shinzo
- Tokyo Pig
- Transformers: Robots in Disguise
- Wild Arms: Twilight Venom
- Willy Fog 2
- Wowser

=== Voice director ===
- Battle B-Daman
- Bleach
- Bobobo-bo Bo-bobo
- Cyborg 009 The Cyborg Soldier
- Digimon: Digital Monsters
- Digimon Fusion
- Duel Masters
- Elsword
- Eyeshield 21
- Idaten Jump
- Iron Virgin Jun
- Mon Colle Knights
- Komi Can't Communicate
- Saint Seiya: The Lost Canvas
- Shinzo
