= Satomi Ichikawa =

Japanese children's book author and illustrator

- 市川 里美
- Born: January 15, 1949 (age 76); Gifu, Japan
- Known for: Children's literature

Satomi Ichikawa (市川 里美, Ichikawa Satomi; 1949–) is a Japanese children's literature illustrator and author who has lived in Paris since 1971. She has illustrated more than seventy picture books in over a dozen languages, but is best known for creating the Nora series (1986–1994) and for illustrating the You Are My I Love You collection written by Maryann Cusimano Love.

== Biography ==
Ichikawa was born on January 15, 1949, in Gifu, Japan. She was raised by a pair of teachers, Harumi and Nobuko Ichikawa, in the Gifu region. In later interviews, Ichikawa mentioned feeling unfulfilled and bored in her hometown, which encouraged her to leave Japan and travel elsewhere.

Ichikawa moved to Paris, France in December 1971 when she was twenty-two, after graduating college in Japan but without a job and unable to speak a word of French. She accepted a job working with children as an au pair while studying the language. Ichikawa had no artistic experience, but began drawing immediately after she saw the work of painter Louis-Maurice Boutet de Monvel (1850–1913) in a bookshop window. Ichikawa remembered falling in love with the artist's work and searching for his books in second hand shops, unsure whether he was alive. By 1979, she was recorded in The Horn Book Magazine as responsible for keeping Boutet de Movel's memory alive. In a 2020 interview with the French magazine Télérama, she recalled her arrival in Paris with wonder:

"Woah! On the first day, I said to myself: I stay, at all costs! The roofs with the chimneys! The old buildings, the streets! Even today, I am amazed by so much beauty every day."

— Satomi Ichikawa

In need of a job to finance her determination to remain in Paris, Ichikawa visited a bookstore while on vacation in London and copied the names and addresses of the publishing houses of popular children's books. Her first original title was published in by British publisher Heinemann in 1975.

As of 2022, Ichikawa continues to create original children's books from her home in Paris. Many of her titles include depictions of two of her biggest hobbies: dancing and doll collection.

== Career ==
Ichikawa's stories and illustrations have been published almost every year since she began working in Paris in 1971. Two or three children's books some years have led to a total of seventy titles. Ichikawa is not the first Japanese children's artist to find success sharing her work in France. France has translated more Japanese children's books than any other European nation including Yasuko Koide, Haruo Yamashita, Kazuo Iwamura, and Satomi Ichikawa.

Ichikawa has traveled internationally for several weeks annually to study children or animals. The publications follow her trips, are both stories for children and travel diaries of her journeys and experiences. Many of Satomi's original stories serve as records of her travels to the rainforests of the Amazon, the savannas of Africa, the markets of Morocco, the mountains of Guatemala, and beyond. Though she has traveled extensively, Satomi always returns to her home in Paris, where her favorite location to visit for inspiration is Luxembourg Gardens.

=== Popular titles ===
In the early 1980s Ichikawa spent a month and a half on a solitary vacation at her friend's private castle. She did not intend to work during her stay, but found herself overwhelmingly inspired by her surroundings. She soon crafted the first book in what would eventually become a bestselling series of children's books about a young girl named Nora. Nora's Castle was published first in France and then in the United States in April 1986. The book was well received by teachers and reviewers so Satomi soon began work on the next one, Nora's Stars, which was published in 1989. Nora's Ducks, Nora's Roses and Nora's Surprise soon followed.

In addition to illustrating dozens of her own titles, Ichikawa has illustrated many books for other authors. The first book she illustrated in collaboration with another author, Keep Running, Allen! by Clyde Robert Bulla, became an award-winning book that was so successful it has since been translated to at least five languages. She also illustrated several books for author Elizabeth Laird, including Rosy's Garden: A Child's Keepsake of Flowers.

Ichikawa illustrated all seven books in the popular Tanya series by Patricia Lee Gauch between 1989 and 2002. The series follows a hopeful young ballet dancer as she discovers the ups and downs of such a demanding art form. Ichikawa said that Patricia had written the first book at her request, to combine her passions of illustration and classical dance. Ichikawa considers her work on the Tanya series to be one of the highlights of her career. The series was compiled and published as The Tanya Treasury in 2002.

In 2001, Ichikawa created the watercolor illustrations for the book You Are My I Love You written by Maryann Cusimano Love and published by Penguin Random House. The story was written to be read to a child by a parent, with bilingual Spanish-English copies eventually published to encourage childhood multilingual learning and family bonding. By 2012, the series had expanded to include You Are My Wish, You Are My Miracles, and You Are My Wonders. As of 2013, the series sold over million copies and was published in six languages.

=== Translations ===
Nearly all of Ichikawa's publications have been translated to at least two of more than a dozen popular languages. Her work is most commonly published in Dutch, English, French, German, Japanese, and Spanish, though it is not uncommon for her books to be translated to Italian, Korean, Norwegian, and Swedish. Several of her books have even been published in Catalan, Chinese, Danish, and Finnish. The majority of Satomi's English-language original books and translations have been published by Philomel Books, now an imprint of Penguin Random House. The publishing house was created in the early 1980s to share poetic books that were "beautiful in concept and form, and fine enough to be celebrated as gifts." Patricia Lee Gauch served as editor-in-chief from 1985 until 2003, making her the editor in charge of the company when most of Satomi's English works were published. In addition to publishing many of Satomi Ichikawa's books, Philomel Books was also responsible for the publication of popular titles like Eric Carle's The Very Hungry Caterpillar, Brian Jacques' Redwall series, and Owl Moon by Jane Yolen and John Schoenherr at around the same time.

Harriët Laurey (1924–2004) singlehandedly translated more than half a dozen of Ichikawa's books to Dutch, including all of the books in the Suzanne and Nicholas series. The popular series has been translated to six languages, with the main characters' names shifting accordingly to be more recognizable to children. Though the sibling pair are known as Suzanne and Nicholas in English, they were named Nikkie and Sanne in Dutch, Timm and Tina in German, Annette and Nicolai in Norwegian, and Suzanne became Suzette in French.

One of Satomi's first original children's books, a 32-page book titled Friends (1976), was rediscovered decades after its initial (unknown) release and republished in English, French, German, and Italian in 2019.

=== Media ===
Satomi's work has been reviewed in hundreds of literary magazines, newspapers, websites, and more. Some of the more notable English publications to have discussed her work are Booklist, The Horn Book Magazine, Kirkus Reviews, the Los Angeles Times, The New York Times, and School Library Journal. A review of Nora's Surprise written by Jacqueline Elsner for School Library Journal in May 1994 specifically commended Satomi's illustrations, saying that everything she drew "whether animal, toy, or person, is full of life, humor, and expression in every gesture." Satomi Ichikawa was interviewed by Publishers Weekly for a full-page biographic article that was shared on June 7, 1993. In 2015, Satomi's French publisher L'école des loisirs interviewed the artist about her recent work and published a video of the discussion. Similarly, a bookstore in Hossegor, France recorded a video interview with Satomi in celebration of the town's 5th annual children's book festival in 2019.

== Awards and honors ==
Satomi Ichikawa's books and illustrations have received numerous international awards, many highlighting her portrayals of diverse characters and stories. For example, her 2006 original book My Father's Shop was the recipient of several awards for her informed representation of a young Moroccan boy learning how to speak the languages spoken by his neighbors. The following list is a small selection of the recognitions and honors received by Satomi Ichikawa, her stories, and her illustrations.

- 2014 Selection Award –You Are My I Love You (2001), El día de los niños/El día de los libros, Association for Library Service to Children.
- 2007 Honor – My Father's Shop (2006), Children's Africana Book Awards, Africa Access.
- 2007 Grades K-2 Selection Award – My Father's Shop (2006), Outstanding International Books, United States Board on Books for Young People.
- 2007 Selection Award – My Father's Shop (2006), Cooperative Children's Book Center, University of Wisconsin–Madison.
- 2005 Selection Award – La La Rose (2004), Cooperative Children's Book Center, University of Wisconsin–Madison.
- 2003 Selection Award – My Pig Amarillo (2002), Lasting Connections, American Library Association.
- 1992 Selection Award – Bravo, Tanya (1992), Cooperative Children's Book Center, University of Wisconsin–Madison.
- 1989 Notable Book Award – Dance, Tanya (1989), Association for Library Service to Children, American Library Association.
- 1981 Art Award – Keep Running, Allen! (1978), Sankei Children's Book Award.
- 1978 Special Mention – Suzanne and Nicholas at the Market (1978), Bologna Children's Book Fair, Bologna, Italy.
- 1978 Kodansha Prize – Poems of Spring (1977), Kodansha, Japan.

== Publications ==
Children's books illustrated by Satomi Ichikawa
Title	Author	English publisher	Language(s)	Release date
A Child's Book of Seasons	Satomi Ichikawa	Heinemann	Dutch, English, German, Japanese, Swedish	1975
Friends	Satomi Ichikawa	Heinemann	English, French, German, Italian	1976
From Morn to Midnight	Elaine Moss	Crowell	English	1977
Suzanne and Nicholas in the Garden	Satomi Ichikawa	Scholastic	Dutch, English, French, German, Spanish	March 1977
Suzanne and Nicholas at the Market	Satomi Ichikawa	Scholastic	Dutch, English, French, German, Norwegian, Spanish	1978
Keep Running, Allen!	Clyde Robert Bulla	Crowell	Danish, English, French, German, Swedish	1978
Suzanne and Nicholas and the Four Seasons	Satomi Ichikawa	Hodder	Dutch, English, French, German, Spanish	1978
Suzanne and Nicholas at the Children's Circus	Satomi Ichikawa	Gautier-Languereau (French)	Dutch, English, French, German	1979
Under the Cherry Tree	Cynthia Mitchell	Heinemann	English, German	1979
Let's Play	Satomi Ichikawa	Philomel Books	Dutch, English, Finnish, German	October 1981
Suzanne and Nicholas at the Zoo	Satomi Ichikawa	Betz Annette (German)	Dutch, German	1982
Merry Christmas: Children at Christmastime Around the World	Robina Beckles Willson	Philomel Books	English, German, Italian	1983
The Wonderful Rainy Week	Martine Jauregulberry	Philomel Books	English, French, German, Italian	1983
Suzanne and Nicholas Travel the World	Satomi Ichikawa	J.H. Gottmer (Dutch)	Dutch, French, German	1984
Here A Little Child I Stand	Cynthia Mitchell	Philomel Books	English	1985
Nora's Castle	Satomi Ichikawa	Philomel Books	English, French, Japanese, Spanish	April 1986
Happy Birthday: A Book of Birthday Celebrations	Elizabeth Laird	Collins	Dutch, English, French, German	1987
Butterfingers	Sylvia Clouzeau	Aladdin Books	English, French	1988
Nora's Stars	Satomi Ichikawa	Philomel Books	English, French, Japanese, Korean	March 1989
Dance, Tanya	Patricia Lee Gauch	Philomel Books	Catalan, English, Korean, Spanish	1989
Tanya Loved to Dance	Patricia Lee Gauch	Heinemann	Danish, English	1989
Rosy's Garden: A Child's Keepsake of Flowers	Elizabeth Laird	Philomel Books	Chinese, Dutch, English, German, Japanese	March 1990
Nora's Duck	Satomi Ichikawa	Philomel Books	Chinese, English, French, Japanese, Korean	January 1991
Bravo, Tanya	Patricia Lee Gauch	Philomel Books	Catalan, Dutch, English, French, Spanish	1992
Fickle Barbara	Satomi Ichikawa	Philomel Books	English	1993
Nora's Roses	Satomi Ichikawa	Philomel Books	English, Korean	June 1993
Nora's Surprise	Satomi Ichikawa	Philomel Books	English, French, Korean, Spanish	April 1994
Please Come to Tea!	Satomi Ichikawa	Heinemann	English	1994
Isabela's Ribbons	Satomi Ichikawa	Philomel Books	English, Spanish	September 1995
Grandpa's Soup	Eiko Kadono	Eerdmans	English, Japanese	1997
Rosy's Winter	Elizabeth Laird	Heinemann	English	1997
Tanya and the Magic Wardrobe	Patricia Lee Gauch	Puffin Books	English, French, Spanish	1997
Tanya and Emily in a Dance for Two	Patricia Lee Gauch	Penguin Group	English	1998
Y a-t-il des ours en Afrique? (Are There Bears in Africa?)	Satomi Ichikawa	L'école des loisir (French)	French, German, Italian, Japanese, Korean, Spanish	1998
Presenting Tanya, the Ugly Duckling	Patricia Lee Gauch	Philomel Books	English, French, Spanish	1999
The Lost Flower Children	Janet Taylor Lisle	Puffin Books	English	1999
The First Bear in Africa!	Satomi Ichikawa	Philomel Books	English	April 2001
What the Little Fir Tree Wore to the Christmas Party	Satomi Ichikawa	Philomel Books	English, French, Japanese	September 2001
Das Geheimnis des Affenbrotbaums (The Mystery of the Baobab Tree)	Satomi Ichikawa	Babalibri (German)	Danish, French, German, Italian	2001
You Are My I Love You	Maryann Cusimano Love	Penguin Random House	Chinese, English, French, German, Japanese, Korean, Spanish	2001
My Pig Amarillo	Satomi Ichikawa	Philomel Books	English, Italian, Spanish	June 2002
Shyam et Shankar	Satomi Ichikawa	L'école des loisir (French)	French	2002
Tanya and The Red Shoes	Patricia Lee Gauch	Philomel Books	English, Spanish	2002
The Tanya Treasury	Patricia Lee Gauch	Philomel Books	English	2002
La La Rose	Satomi Ichikawa	Philomel Books	English, French	2004
You Are My Miracle	Maryann Cusimano Love	Penguin Young Readers	English, Spanish	September 2005
Ma chèvre Karam-Karam (My goat Karam-Karam)	Satomi Ichikawa	L'école des loisir (French)	French, Korean	2005
My Father's Shop	Satomi Ichikawa	Kane/Miller	English, French	March 2006
I Am Pangoo the Penguin	Satomi Ichikawa	Philomel Books	English, French, German, Korean	September 2006
Mon plus beau cadeau, c'est toi! (My Greatest Gift is You!)	Satomi Ichikawa	Albin Michel Jeunesse (French)	French	2006
Le papillon de Boun (Boun's Butterfly)	Satomi Ichikawa	L'école des loisir (French)	Dutch, French	2006
Come Fly with Me	Satomi Ichikawa	Philomel Books	English	April 2008
De la glace aux pommes de terre? (Potato Ice Cream?)	Satomi Ichikawa	L'école des loisir (French)	French, Japanese, Spanish	2009
My Little Train	Satomi Ichikawa	Philomel Books	English, Japanese	November 2010
You are My Wish	Maryann Cusimano Love	Penguin Young Readers	English	March 2010
You Are My Wonders	Maryann Cusimano Love	Penguin Young Readers	English	2012
La fête de la tomate (The Tomato Festival)	Satomi Ichikawa	L'école des loisir (French)	French, German	2012
Les voitures de Jibril (Jibril's Cars)	Satomi Ichikawa	L'école des loisir (French)	French	2013
Patricio et Renata (Patrick and Renata)	Satomi Ichikawa	L'école des loisir (French)	French	2013
Un palmier à marier (A Palm Tree to Marry)	Satomi Ichikawa	L'école des loisir (French)	French	2015
Due eroi inseparabili (Two Inseparable Heroes)	Satomi Ichikawa	Babalibri (Italian)	Italian	2016
Bienvenue sur mon île (Welcome to my Island)	Satomi Ichikawa	L'école des loisir (French)	French, Japanese	2018
Le bain de Mammout (Mammout's Bath)	Satomi Ichikawa	L'école des loisir (French)	French	2018
Mon petit cheval Mahabat (My Little Horse Mahabat)	Satomi Ichikawa	L'école des loisir (French)	French, German, Japanese	2019
Croc-Croc Caïman	Satomi Ichikawa	L'école des loisir (French)	French, Japanese	2020
Accroche-toi à maman! (Hold on to Mom!)	Satomi Ichikawa	L'école des loisir (French)	French, Japanese	2022

== Collections ==
Satomi Ichikawa's original artwork and publications are held by numerous museums, and institutions around the world. The International Library of Children's Literature at the national library of Japan (National Diet Library) holds more than fifty of her original works, making theirs the largest known collection of Ichikawa's artwork held by a public institution. Satomi Ichikawa's work is held in thousands of international libraries, the majority of which can be found in France, Japan, Germany, the Netherlands, and the United States. The following is a non-exhaustive selection of significant cultural institutions that count Satomi Ichikawa's work amongst their collections.

- Bookworm Children's Library, Taleigão, India.
- Cotsen Children's Library, Princeton University, New Jersey, United States.
- German National Library, Frankfurt, Germany.
- International Library of Children's Literature, National Diet Library, Tokyo, Japan.
- Bibliothèque nationale de France, Paris, France.
- National Library of Korea, Seoul, South Korea.
- Royal Library of the Netherlands, The Hague, Netherlands.
- Swiss Institute for Youth and Media, Lausanne, Switzerland.
