= Kiki's Delivery Service (2014 film) =

- Promotional release poster
- Directed by: Takashi Shimizu
- Screenplay by: Satoko Okudera; Takashi Shimizu
- Based on: Kiki's Delivery Service by Eiko Kadono
- Produced by: Haruo Umekawa
- Starring: Fūka Koshiba; Ryōhei Hirota
- Cinematography: Sohei Tanikawa
- Edited by: Ayumu Takahashi
- Music by: Taro Iwashiro
- Production company: Kadokawa
- Distributed by: Toei Company Ltd.
- Release date: March 1, 2014 (Japan)
- Running time: 108 minutes
- Country: Japan
- Language: Japanese

Kiki's Delivery Service (魔女の宅急便, Majo no Takkyūbin; lit. 'Witch's Express Home Delivery') is a 2014 Japanese fantasy film directed by Takashi Shimizu. Based on the children's fantasy novel of the same name, it is the second adaptation of the novel after the 1989 Studio Ghibli anime film of the same name.

== Plot ==
Kiki, a young witch, lives with her witch mother Kokiri and her ordinary human father Okino. As her 13th birthday nears, Kiki prepares to leave her loving home and live in a strange place for a whole year, as per an old witchcraft tradition. On her birthday, Kiki sets off on her broomstick, accompanied by her black cat Jiji.

After hours of flight over land and sea, she discovers a city by the sea. She makes a stopover at the local zoo, and soon realizes not every resident likes witches. Soon after, Kiki meets the baker Osono, who offers her accommodation under the roof of her windmill.

Next, Kiki has to find a living. Kiki can only fly with her magic powers, which she loves to do. Encouraged by Osono, she decides to open an air delivery service in the sleepy coastal town. At first she didn't want to hire anyone. Only a few aviation-obsessed youngsters are interested in them. But Osono continues to support Kiki and slowly the flight business begins to take off. With her cheerful nature and courage, she is slowly making friends. But then she is taken advantage of by a teenager who was interested in her magic powers. She tells other youths that Kiki can curse her. In order to scare them, she sends Kiki to them with an alleged curse letter. When Kiki realizes the truth, she is very disappointed and sad.

The next setback follows shortly thereafter. It is reported on TV that a hippo from the zoo where Kiki ended up when she arrived in town has become ill. Rumor has it that Kiki can bewitch and curse people and animals. Her delivery service comes to a standstill, and the suspicion and fear of the residents weigh so heavily on Kiki that she falls ill. She loses her courage and with it her magic powers. The flying boy named Tombo encourages Kiki to stay true to herself. Kiki begins to overcome her self-doubt. She accepts a risky job from the zoo director. The sick hippo baby Maruko is to be treated by a famous veterinarian who lives far away from the small town on a small island. Despite a heavy storm, Kiki takes off immediately. She transports the injured baby hippo on a stretcher. Tombo, who also accompanies her during the flight, encourages her constantly. Below them the turbulent sea threatens.

Meanwhile, the people of the city are listening to the radio, listening to news of the rescue operation. Finally, Kiki and her friends reach the island, and the doctor quickly heals the hippopotamus Maruko in a few simple steps. The population, who understood after the rescue operation that Kiki is a lovely witch, celebrates her and her rescue operation at the end of the story. And soon after that, Kiki's apprenticeship year away from home is over, so she can call herself a real witch.

== Cast ==
- Fuka Koshiba as Kiki
- Ryōhei Hirota as Tombo
- Machiko Ono as Osono, the baker
- Hiroshi Yamamoto as Fukuo, her husband
- Miho Kanazawa as Saki
- Rie Miyazawa as Kokiri
- Michitaka Tsutsui as Okino
- Minako Kotobuki as voice of Jiji the cat
- Tadanobu Asano as Dr. Ishi
- LiLiCo as voice of radio DJ

== Release ==
Kiki's Delivery Service was released in Japan on March 1, 2014. It was the third highest-grossing film on its release in Japan, making ¥128 million (US$1.25 million) from 117,000 admissions on 281 screens.

== Reception ==
Film Business Asia gave the film a four out of ten rating, referring to the film as "bland, charmless and undramatic". The review stated that actress Fuka Koshiba was "way too mature for the 13-year-old, waifish Kiki and has a forced perkiness that drags the action down" and stated that "the visual and special effects are more run-of-the-mill 20th century than state-of-the-art 21st". Variety gave the film a negative review, finding "its charmless heroine, leaden storytelling and dime-store production values unlikely to bewitch anyone except tiny tots."
