= Sasakawa =

Sasakawa (written: 笹川 lit. "Sasa river") is a Japanese surname. Notable people with the surname include:

- Chihiro Sasakawa (笹川 千尋, born 1948), Japanese bacteriologist
- Hiroyoshi Sasakawa (born 1966), Japanese politician and businessman
- Ryōichi Sasakawa (笹川 良一, 1899–1995), Japanese businessman and politician
- Yōhei Sasakawa (笹川 陽平, born 1939), Japanese activist
