= Akiko Hayashi =

Japanese illustrator (1945–2026)

- 林 明子
- Born: 20 March 1945; Tokyo, Japan
- Died: 1 July 2026 (aged 81); Suwa, Japan
- Education: Yokohama National University
- Occupation: Illustrator

Akiko Hayashi (Japanese: 林 明子 Hayashi Akiko; 20 March 1945 – 1 July 2026) was a Japanese illustrator.

Hayashi notably illustrated the children's picture books Miki's First Errand (はじめてのおつかい, Hajimete no otsukai; 1976; written by Yoriko Tsutsui), Good Evening Mr. Moon (おつきさまこんばんは, Otsuki-sama konbanwa; 1986) and Kon and Aki (こんとあき, Kon to Aki; 1989). She also illustrated Eiko Kadono's 1985 children's novel Kiki's Delivery Service.

Hayashi died of pneumonia on 1 July 2026, at the age of 81.
