= Kiki's Delivery Service =

1989 Japanese animated film

- Theatrical release poster

Japanese name
- Japanese: 魔女の宅急便
Transcriptions
- Revised Hepburn: Majo no Takkyūbin
- Directed by: Hayao Miyazaki
- Screenplay by: Hayao Miyazaki
- Based on: Kiki's Delivery Service by Eiko Kadono
- Produced by: Hayao Miyazaki
- Starring: Minami Takayama; Rei Sakuma; Kappei Yamaguchi; Keiko Toda
- Cinematography: Shigeo Sugimura
- Edited by: Takeshi Seyama
- Music by: Joe Hisaishi
- Production company: Studio Ghibli
- Distributed by: Toei Company
- Release date: July 29, 1989
- Running time: 102 minutes
- Country: Japan
- Language: Japanese
- Budget: ¥800 million ($6.9 million)
- Box office: $41.8 million (Note: This value is based on adding the box office revenue of the film's original release in Japan (US$31 million), the 1990 Hong Kong release (US$519,000), and the various re-releases between 2004 and 2023 (US$10,366,082).)

Kiki's Delivery Service (Note: Japanese: 魔女の宅急便, Hepburn: Majo no Takkyūbin; lit. 'Witch's Express Home Delivery') is a 1989 Japanese animated fantasy film written, produced, and directed by Hayao Miyazaki, based on Eiko Kadono's 1985 novel Kiki's Delivery Service. Animated by Studio Ghibli, the film stars Minami Takayama, Rei Sakuma, Kappei Yamaguchi, and Keiko Toda. The story follows Kiki (Takayama), a young witch who moves to the port city of Koriko with her cat Jiji (Sakuma) and starts a flying courier service.

In 1987, Group Fudosha asked Kadono's publishers for the rights to the novel to be made into a film by either Miyazaki or Isao Takahata. Production began near the release of My Neighbor Totoro (1988). Miyazaki initially worked as producer, but took over directing from Sunao Katabuchi as he became more involved in the project. As the novel is based on a fictional northern European country, Miyazaki and his team traveled to locations such as Visby, Sweden, to research its landscape. Miyazaki altered the story, adding new scenes to emphasize the theme of independence and growing up. According to Miyazaki, the film portrays the gulf between independence and reliance among teenage Japanese girls.

Kiki's Delivery Service was released in Japan on July 29, 1989, by Toei. It was the first Studio Ghibli film to be successful on initial release, grossing a total of ¥4.3 billion ($31 million). It received critical acclaim and multiple awards.

An English dub was produced by Streamline Pictures for Japan Airlines international flights in 1989. The Walt Disney Studios produced an English dub in 1997, which became the first film under a deal between Tokuma and Disney to be released in English. It was released to home media in 1998.

== Plot ==
In a world where witches exist alongside non-magical humans, 13-year-old Kiki decides to go out on her own, which all young witches must do when they turn 13. She leaves with her familiar, a talking black cat named Jiji, and her mother's old, reliable broomstick. Kiki flies off into the cloudless night when the moon is full, searching for a new town for settlement. She encounters another witch and her cat whom she finds pretentious, but they cause Kiki to wonder what her special "skill" is. Kiki finds the town of Koriko and accidentally flies through traffic, causing disruptions. She is approached by a policeman, but a boy named Tombo helps her escape.

Kiki looks for a place to live and work in her new town. She finds the Gutiokipanja bakery, owned by Osono and her husband, Fukuo, who are expecting a child. Osono invites her to live in a room above the bakery. Kiki opens a business delivering goods by broomstick, known as the "Witch Delivery Service". Her first delivery is of a small stuffed toy of a black cat that resembles Jiji, as a birthday gift for Osono's neighbor's nephew Ket. Along the way, she is caught in the wind and ends up in a forest filled with crows, which attack her, causing her to lose the toy. They come up with a plan in which Jiji pretends to be the toy for Ket until Kiki can retrieve the real one. She finds it in the log cabin of a young painter with crows, Ursula, who repairs and returns it. With the help of Ket's dog Jeff, Kiki successfully retrieves Jiji and replaces him with the stuffed cat.

The next day, Tombo gives her an invitation to visit his aviation club. However, she gets busy with her deliveries, and gets caught in a thunderstorm on her way back. Drenched from the rain, she decides not to go. She then falls ill, but Osono cares for her until she recovers. Osono secretly arranges for Kiki to see Tombo again by assigning her a delivery addressed to him. Kiki apologizes for missing the party, and Tombo takes her for a test ride on the flying machine he is working on, fashioned from a bicycle. Kiki warms up to him, but is once again disgusted by Tombo's friends.

Kiki becomes depressed and discovers she can no longer understand Jiji. She has also lost her flying ability and is forced to suspend her delivery business. Ursula then visits Kiki and invites her go to her cabin. She agrees, and the two spend time together there. Ursula determines that Kiki's crisis is a form of artist's block, and then advises her to find a new purpose, so that she can regain her powers.

While visiting a former customer's house, Kiki witnesses an airship accident on television. Tombo is seen trying to help tie the dirigible to the ground, but a gust of wind pushes the aircraft away with him clinging to the rope. Kiki rushes to the scene and asks to borrow a broom from a local shop-owner. She regains her flying power and manages to rescue Tombo after the airship crashes into the city's clock tower. While celebrating, she remains unable to understand Jiji. (Note: In the initial Disney English dub, Kiki regains the ability to understand Jiji in this scene. In another Disney English dub in 2010, Kiki does not.) With her confidence restored, she resumes her delivery service, and writes a letter home saying that she and Jiji are happy.

== Voice cast ==
Character name		Voice actor		
English	Japanese	Japanese	English	
English	Japanese	Japanese	Streamline Pictures/Tokuma/Quality Sound Studios (1989)	Disney/Buena Vista/Screenmusic Studios (1998)
Kiki	Kiki (キキ)	Minami Takayama	Lisa Michelson	Kirsten Dunst
Jiji	Jiji (ジジ)	Rei Sakuma	Kerrigan Mahan	Phil Hartman
Osono	Osono (おソノ)	Keiko Toda	Alexandra Kenworthy	Tress MacNeille
Ursula	Urusura (ウルスラ)	Minami Takayama	Edie Mirman	Janeane Garofalo
Tombo	Tonbo (トンボ)	Kappei Yamaguchi	Eddie Frierson	Matthew Lawrence
Fukuo (Osono's husband)	Fukuo (フクオ)	Koichi Yamadera	Greg Snegoff	John Hostetter
Kokiri (Kiki's mother)	Kokiri (コキリ)	Mieko Nobusawa	Barbara Goodson	Kath Soucie
Okino (Kiki's father)	Okino (オキノ)	Kōichi Miura	John Dantona	Jeff Bennett
Madame	Madamu (マダム)	Haruko Kato	Melanie MacQueen	Debbie Reynolds
Barsa	Baasa (バーサ)	Hiroko Seki	Edie Mirman	Edie McClurg
Senior Witch	Jōkyū majo (上級魔女)	Yūko Kobayashi	Wendee Lee	Debi Derryberry
Madame's Granddaughter	Madamu no magomusume (マダムの孫娘)	Keiko Kagimoto	Wendee Lee	Sherry Lynn
Ket	Ketto (ケット)	Yuriko Fuchizaki	Lara Cody	Pamela Adlon
Maki (Ket's aunt)	Maki (マキ)	Kikuko Inoue	Lara Cody	Julia Fletcher
Ket's mother	Ketto no haha (ケットの母)	Mika Doi	Diane Michelle	Julia Fletcher
Ket's father	Ketto no chichi (ケットの父)	Takaya Hashi	Steve Kramer	John DeMita
Ket's grandmother	Ketto no o bāchan (ケットのおばあちゃん)	Yoshiko Asai	Mike Reynolds	Julia Fletcher
Miss Dora	Misu dōra (ミス・ドーラ)	Shō Saito	Diane Michelle	Fay Dewitt
Truck Driver	Torakku untenshu (トラック運転手)	Michihiro Ikemizu	—N/a	Corey Burton
Hotel Receptionist	Hoteru no uketsuke-gakari (ホテルの受付係)	Shinpachi Tsuji	Doug Stone	Matt K. Miller
Policeman	Keikan (警官)	Koichi Yamadera	Steve Kramer	Matt K. Miller
Radio Announcer	Rajio anaunsā (ラジオアナウンサー)	Koichi Yamadera	Carl Macek	Corey Burton
Man with Push Broom	Oshi hōki o motsu otoko (押しほうきを持つ男)	Takashi Taguchi	Steve Kramer	Jeff Bennett
Dirigible Captain	Hikōsen no senchō (飛行船の船長)	Akio Ōtsuka	Dave Mallow	John Hostetter
Clock Tower Caretaker	Tokei-tō no kanrinin (時計塔の管理人)	Tomomichi Nishimura	Greg Snegoff	Lewis Arquette
Baby	Akachan (赤ちゃん)	Chika Sakamoto	—N/a	—N/a
Friends	Tomodachi (友達)	Yūko Tsuga; Yoshiko Kamei	Lara Cody; Barbara Goodson	—N/a
Old Lady	Rō fujin (老婦人)	Hiroko Maruyama	Melanie MacQueen	—N/a
Boy	Otokonoko (男の子)	Hiroko Maruyama	—N/a	—N/a
Tombo's Friends	Tonbo no tomodachi (トンボの友達)	—N/a	Dave Mallow; Diane Michelle; Lara Cody	—N/a
Hometown Adults	Furusato no otona-tachi (故郷の大人たち)	—N/a	Mike Reynolds; Wendee Lee	—N/a

== Themes and analysis ==
A major theme of the film is maturity. After leaving her parents who are supportive of her independence, Kiki has to face problems common to adolescence such as finding a job, seeking acceptance, and taking care of herself. According to Helen McCarthy, the "vibrant" Stockholm-inspired city gives a sense of safety as well as independence. The concept of vulnerability is also examined closely in the film. Critic Mark Schilling notes a scene during Kiki's first night away from home where Kiki rushes back to her room and slams the door behind her to avoid being spotted by Fukuo. Fukuo, however, steps outside simply to stretch his arms, and Kiki's shy behavior "expresses [her] youth, vulnerability, and isolation."

Another theme is the transition from traditional to contemporary. Kiki is shown to balance both of these qualities. For instance, Kiki observes the tradition of witches wearing dark-colored clothes, but adorns her hair with a bright red bow. Kiki also engages in other traditional methods, such as baking with a wood-burning stove and flying her mother's old broom.

Kiki's loss of her witch powers is considered the worst crisis she has to face during the film. Her loss of flight reflects the harm dealt to Kiki by her own self-doubts. Petrana Radulovic also suggests that Jiji's bond with Kiki represents the experiences she had as a child, and that once Kiki loses her powers to talk to Jiji, she becomes more lonely. Jiji had served as the wiser voice (imaginary companion) to Kiki, and she stopped being able to understand him the moment she struggles with self-doubt. According to Miyazaki himself, Jiji is meant to represent the immature side of Kiki, and her inability to talk to Jiji represents her newfound maturity at the end of the movie.

In relation to Kiki's portrayal as a witch, some have drawn comparisons to historical or contemporary views on witches and witchcraft. The film incorporates some conventions from fairy-tales such as a black cat companion for Kiki, Kiki's use of a broom for flight, and her black dress. While girls with magical powers are common in Japanese television, Miyazaki wanted to stray away from the various stereotypes generated from these shows, remarking that witchcraft "has always merely been the means to fulfill the dreams of young girls."

Kiki has also been compared to other characters in Miyazaki's films. While there are overt differences in demeanor between Kiki and San from Princess Mononoke, a character who is motivated by anger, both characters take control over their own lives. This theme of remarkable independence is also seen in Miyazaki's earlier works, such as in Nausicaä in Nausicaä of the Valley of the Wind. Kiki is also compared to Chihiro of Spirited Away as they are both young girls attempting to seek independence without being rebellious. Both Chihiro and Kiki develop their independence with the help of their friends.

== Production ==
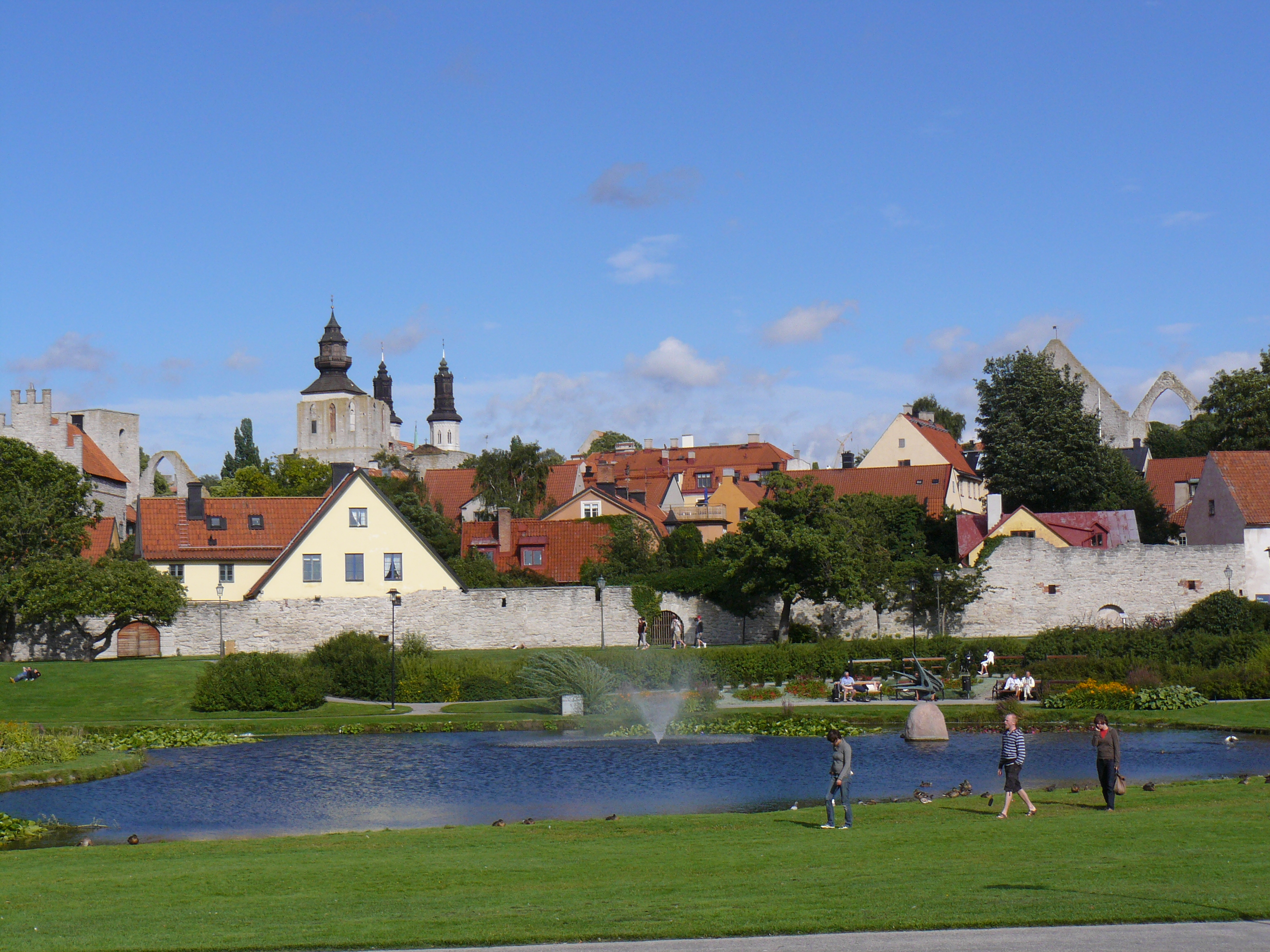
Almedalen in Visby, Gotland. This was one of the regions where Miyazaki got inspiration from for the film.

Kiki and Jiji illustrated by Akiko Hayashi from Kiki's Delivery Service novel. For the film, Kiki's hair was cut short to make the workload easier for the animators.

In 1987, Group Fudosha asked Kadono's publishers for the rights to adapt Kadono's novel into a feature film directed by either Hayao Miyazaki or Isao Takahata of Studio Ghibli. However, both of the chosen directors were busy, working on My Neighbor Totoro and Grave of the Fireflies respectively. Miyazaki accepted the role of producer while the studio continued to search for a director. Near the end of Totoro's production, members of Studio Ghibli were being recruited as senior staff for Kiki's Delivery Service. The character design position was given to Katsuya Kondo, who was working with Miyazaki on Totoro. Hiroshi Ohno, who would later work on projects such as Jin-Roh, was hired as art director at the request of Kazuo Oga.

Miyazaki chose Sunao Katabuchi as director. Katabuchi had worked with Miyazaki on Sherlock Hound; Kiki's Delivery Service was to have been his directorial debut. Studio Ghibli hired Nobuyuki Isshiki as script writer, but Miyazaki was dissatisfied by the first draft, finding it dry and too divergent from his own vision of the film. Although the novel is set in a fictional northern European country, Miyazaki did not originally travel to Sweden for research. Instead, he had previously visited locations such as Visby and Stockholm while attempting to secure the rights for an animated adaptation of Pippi Longstocking. After being denied a meeting with Astrid Lindgren, he later used reference photos from that trip as inspiration for the film's setting. The architecture of Koriko is also based on the design of buildings from other cities such as Amsterdam, Paris, and San Francisco.

Upon their return to Japan, Miyazaki and the creative team worked on conceptual art and character designs. Miyazaki began significantly modifying the story, creating new ideas and changing existing ones. Kiki's Delivery Service, the original children's book by Kadono that the movie was based on, is very different from Miyazaki's finished film. Kadono's novel is more episodic, consisting of small stories about various people and incidents Kiki encounters while making deliveries. Kiki overcomes many challenges in the novel based on "her good heart" and consequently expands her circle of friends. She faces no particular traumas or crises. Many of the more dramatic elements, such as Kiki getting attacked by many crows, losing her powers or the airship incident at the film's climax, are not present in the original story. In order to more clearly illustrate the themes of struggling with independence and growing up in the film, Miyazaki intended to have Kiki face tougher challenges and create a more potent sense of loneliness. Miyazaki remarked, "As movies always create a more realistic feeling, Kiki will suffer stronger setbacks and loneliness than in the original". Kadono was unhappy with the changes made between the book and film, to the point that the project was in danger of being shelved at the screenplay stage. Miyazaki and Toshio Suzuki, the producer of Ghibli, went to the author's home and invited her to the film's studio. After her visit to the studio, Kadono decided to let the project continue.

Miyazaki finished the rough draft of the screenplay in June 1988 and presented it in July 1988. It was at this time that Miyazaki revealed that he had decided to direct the film, because he had influenced the project so much. Kiki's Delivery Service was originally intended to be a 60-minute special, but expanded into a feature film running 102 minutes after Miyazaki completed storyboarding and scripting it.

The word takkyūbin (宅急便, literally "home-fast-mail") in the Japanese title is a trademark of Yamato Transport (which stylized it in non-Japanese languages as TA-Q-BIN), though it is used today as a synonym for takuhaibin (宅配便, "home-delivery-mail"). While Yamato Transport sponsored the film, it initially did not approve of the usage of its trademark, since it was used by Kadono without permission. However, the success of the film restored relations between both her and Yamato Transport.

The film had a production budget of ¥800 million (Note: Equivalent to ¥998 million in 2024), making it one of the most expensive anime films up until then, along with Akira (1988) and Royal Space Force: The Wings of Honnêamise (1987).

== Music ==
Kiki's Delivery Service

Soundtrack album by Joe Hisaishi
- Released: August 25, 1989
- Genres: Anime music; Film score
- Length: 41:45
- Label: Tokuma Shoten
- Producer: Joe Hisaishi

Joe Hisaishi chronology
The Inners (1989)	Kiki's Delivery Service (1989)	Pretender (1989)

As with Hayao Miyazaki's other films, Joe Hisaishi composed the soundtrack for this film. Besides Hisaishi's original scores, Yumi Arai's popular songs Rūju no Dengon (1975) and Yasashisa ni Tsutsumareta Nara (1974) were used as the opening and ending themes, respectively. Three months before the theatrical release of the movie, the image album for the film was published by Tokuma Shoten on Compact disc. A vocal album was released in November 1992.

For the 1997 Disney English dub, much of the soundtrack was retained except for Rūju no Dengon and Yasashisa ni Tsutsumareta Nara, which were the opening and ending themes of the original Japanese version. Instead, they were replaced with two songs by Sydney Forest; "Soaring" and "I'm Gonna Fly". Both these songs were removed from the 2010 DVD re-release of the English dub of Kiki's Delivery Service. Paul Chihara composed the music for the dub, adding music to scenes that were silent in the original Japanese version.

Music releases for Kiki's Delivery Service
Release date	English title	Japanese title
April 10, 1989	Kiki's Delivery Service Image Album	魔女の宅急便 イメージソング集
August 25, 1989	Kiki's Delivery Service Soundtrack	魔女の宅急便 サウンドトラック
December 21, 1989	Kiki's Delivery Service Hi-Tech Series	魔女の宅急便 ハイテックシリーズ
November 25, 1992	Kiki's Delivery Service Vocal Album	魔女の宅急便 ヴォーカルアルバム

== Release ==
=== Box office ===
Kiki's Delivery Service premiered on July 29, 1989, in Japanese theaters. It sold around 2,640,000 tickets in Japan, with a total box office of ¥4.3 billion (US$31 million) in gross receipts. It became the first Studio Ghibli film to be successful during its initial release and was one of 1989's highest-grossing films in Japan. It also grossed HK$4.04 million (US$519,000) in Hong Kong upon release there in 1990. Later re-releases and international releases between 2004 and 2023 grossed US$10,366,082 worldwide, adding up to $41,885,082 grossed worldwide as of 2023. In the United Kingdom, it was 2018's seventh best-selling foreign-language film on home video, and 2019's fifth best-selling foreign-language film (below four other Japanese films, including three Miyazaki anime films).

=== English releases ===
Streamline Pictures produced the first official English dub of Kiki's Delivery Service in November 1989 for Japan Airlines international flights. It was the second Studio Ghibli dub produced by Streamline following My Neighbor Totoro earlier that year. Tokuma Shoten commissioned Streamline for the Kiki's Delivery Service dub after being satisfied with the English production of My Neighbor Totoro, but did not give Streamline the rights to distribute the film in North America. The Streamline dub was released only on the Ghibli LaserDisc Box Set in 1996, which is out of print.

Disney produced an English dub in 1997 and Kiki was the first film released through a deal Disney made with Tokuma. It premiered at the Seattle International Film Festival on May 23, 1998, and was released on both VHS and LaserDisc by Buena Vista Home Video in September 1998. It became the eighth-most sold film at Blockbuster during its first week of availability, and sold over 900,000 copies by September 28, 1998. It was re-released on VHS and debuted on DVD in North America in 2003, alongside the releases of Spirited Away and Castle in the Sky. Disney re-released the film on DVD in 2010 with an updated English dub that removed the earlier dub's deviations from the Japanese version.

In the United Kingdom, the film was released on Blu-ray by StudioCanal alongside a release of Grave of the Fireflies on July 1, 2013, while in North America, Walt Disney Studios Home Entertainment released the film on Blu-ray Disc alongside Princess Mononoke and The Wind Rises, on November 18, 2014. GKIDS re-issued the film on Blu-ray and DVD on October 17, 2017. In October 2019, it was announced the 2010 Disney dub version would be streaming on HBO Max; and in 2020, it was announced the Japanese version and the Disney dub would be streaming on Netflix in Europe. The European Netflix release uses the 1997 version of the Disney dub.

In March 2026, the film was re-released in the United States in 4K IMAX, making $1.7 million during the March 13 to March 15, 2026, weekend.

== Reception ==
At the review aggregator website Rotten Tomatoes, 98% of 47 reviews are positive for Kiki's Delivery Service, and the average rating is 8.1/10. The critics consensus reads, "Kiki's Delivery Service is a heartwarming, gorgeously-rendered tale of a young witch discovering her place in the world." Metacritic, another aggregator, collected 15 reviews and calculated an average rating of 85 out of 100, signifying "universal acclaim".

Initial reviews and reception for Kiki's Delivery Service were positive. Mark Schilling of The Japan Times gave a positive review, praising the realism of Kiki's character, as well as citing various scenes that emphasized it, and Japanese filmmaker Akira Kurosawa also showed admiration for the film. The film also received similar acclaim in America once it was released there. On September 12, 1998, it was the first video release to be reviewed as a normal film on Siskel and Ebert rather than on the "Video Pick of the Week" section. Gene Siskel of the Chicago Tribune and Roger Ebert of the Chicago Sun-Times gave it "two thumbs up"

Retrospective reviews were also positive. IGN's Andy Patrizio praised the film for its simple but meaningful story, as well as the voice acting of the English dub, while Vox's Allegra Frank felt that the film presented its message well.

The film was also ranked high in various publications. Entertainment Weekly rated it as Video of the Year in 1998, and in the same year Roger Ebert went on to rank it as one of the best animated films released in the U.S. The film also ranked No. 12 on Wizard's Anime Magazine's list of the "Top 50 Anime released in North America".

=== Accolades ===
Award	Category	Result	Recipient	Ref.
12th Anime Grand Prix	Best Anime	Won	Kiki's Delivery Service	
12th Anime Grand Prix	Best Female Character	Won	Kiki	
12th Anime Grand Prix	Best Anime Theme Song	Won	"Yasashisa ni Tsutsumaretanara"	
44th Mainichi Film Award	Best Animated Film	Won	Kiki's Delivery Service	
Kinema Junpo Awards	Readers' Choice Award	Won	Kiki's Delivery Service	
13th Japan Academy Prize	Special Award	Won	Kiki's Delivery Service	
13th Japan Academy Prize	Popularity Award	Won	Kiki's Delivery Service	
7th Annual Golden Gross Award	Gold, Japanese Film	Won	Kiki's Delivery Service	
The Movie's Day	Special Achievement Award	Won	Kiki's Delivery Service	
The Erandole Award	Special Award	Won	Kiki's Delivery Service	
Japan Cinema Association Award	Best Film	Won	Kiki's Delivery Service	
Japan Cinema Association Award	Best Director	Won	Hayao Miyazaki	
Agency of Cultural Affairs	Best Film	Won	Kiki's Delivery Service	

== Other media ==
=== Books ===
A four-volume ani-manga book series using stills from the film was published in Japan by Tokuma Shoten between August and September 1989. An English translation would later be published by Viz Media between April and July 2006. Tokuma also published a 208-page art book on February 11, 1989, and Viz Media published the English translation of it on May 9, 2006.

=== Musicals ===
A musical based on the film ran at the Southwark Playhouse in the UK from December 8, 2016, to January 7, 2017, and officially opened on December 13, 2016. It was adapted by Jessica Sian and directed by Katie Hewitt. The musical would later run again from August 10, 2017, to September 3, 2017.

There were also other musicals that ran in Japan. The first ran in Tokyo and Osaka from June 2017 to September 2017, and starred Moka Kamishiraishi as Kiki and Aran Abe as Tombo. A second one ran in 2018 which starred Riko Fukumoto as Kiki. The most recent one ran from March 2021 to April 2021 in Tokyo, Nagoya and Osaka. It stars Neo Inoue as Kiki, and Yūto Nasu as Tombo.
