= Takkyubin in Taiwan =

Takkyubin (宅急便) is a national delivery service company based in Japan. A delivery item can be a parcel, luggage and other forms of packages. The service sends the parcel door to door and delivery is usually next day. The service was started by Yamato Transport Co., LTD in the 1970s and was introduced to Taiwan in 2000 by President Transnet, a subsidiary of President Chain Store Corp., which also runs 7-Eleven in Taiwan.

== Types of packages ==
The range of packages includes regular parcels, oversized boxes, computers, suitcases, etc. In addition to normal package and letter deliveries, Takkyubin offers low temperature and frozen transport facilities, which make deliveries of seafood, fruits and meat possible. Selling local food via Takkyubin to other parts of the nation has become popular with farmers, fishermen, and other food suppliers.

== Pickup and delivery ==
A parcel can be sent from the office, home or hotel by scheduling a pick up time online or on the phone. Alternatively, a parcel can be sent at NikoMart, OK Mart and 7-Eleven convenience stores, cosmetics retailer Cosmed, Carrefour, home furnishings store Working House, the Takkyubin service center, and stores that display a Takkyubin trademark flag.

A parcel can be delivered to any address on the island of Taiwan, which includes homes, shops, offices, and Takkyubin service centers. Students can send their belongings home after a semester in order to avoid carrying heavy luggage onto crowded transportation on the way home. Some shops and department stores also arrange purchased goods deliveries with Takkyubin for the convenience of their shoppers.

== Time and cost ==
Takkyubin generally sends a package anywhere in the country by the next business day and also offers same-day deliveries within certain cities. The cost of the delivery can range from 120NTD to 400NTD depending on the size and destination of the package.
