= Toyota QuickDelivery =

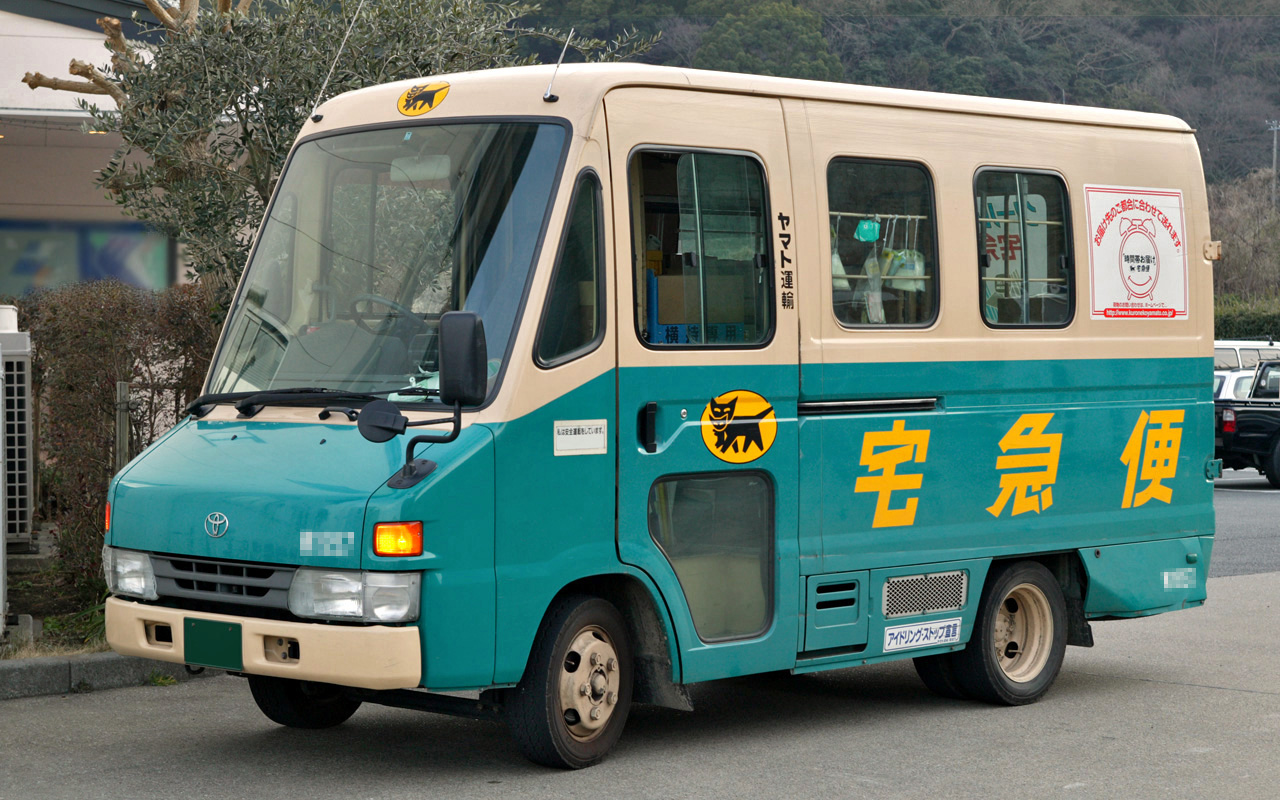
A Yamato Transport ToyotaQuickDelivery QD 200 step van

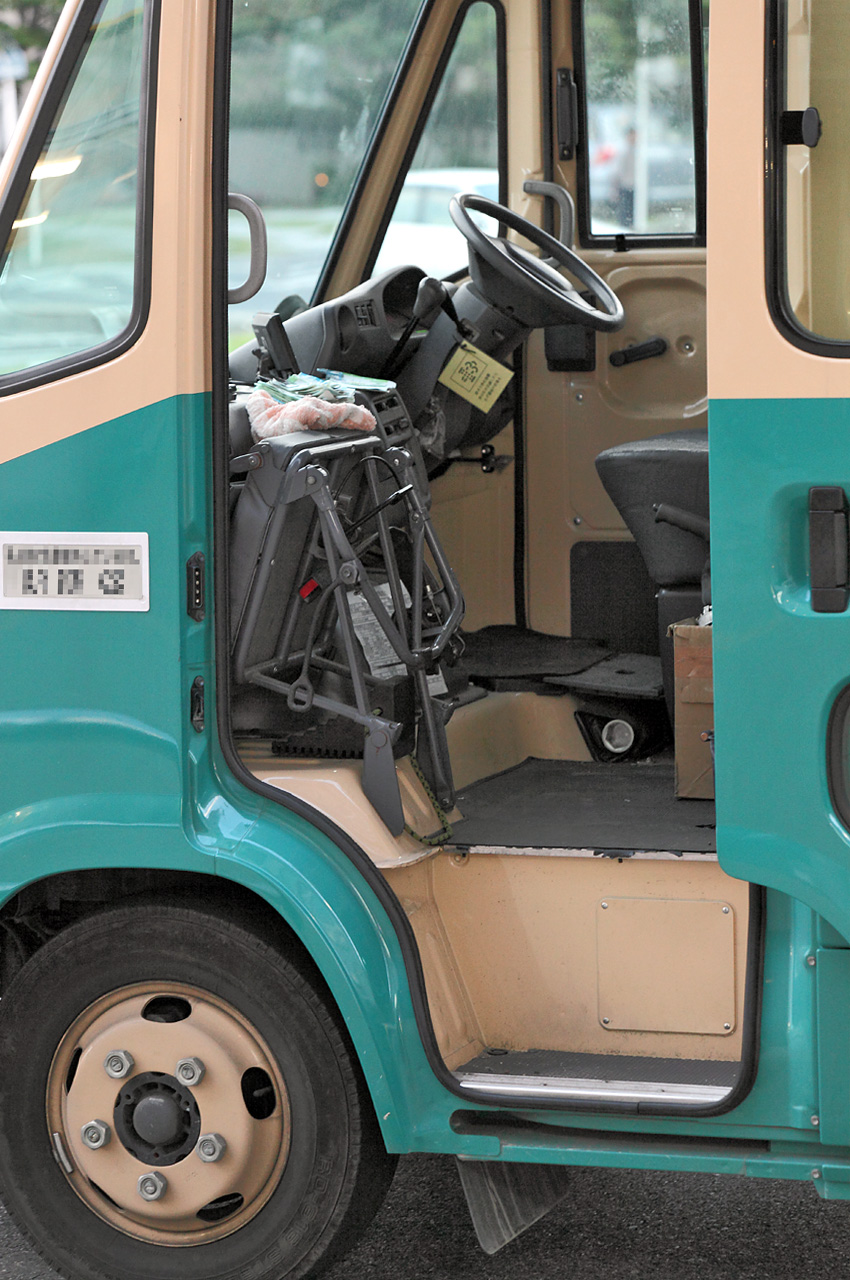
Entrance to the van

The Toyota QuickDelivery is a step van that shares a platform with the Dyna, the ToyoAce, and the HiAce. The QuickDelivery was introduced in 1982, and allows passengers to walk from the drivers seat to the rear of the vehicle standing upright. The powertrain comes as a rear wheel drive or all wheel drive. It is capable of a 2-ton payload starting with the second generation produced from 1986 to 1999. Later a revised version appeared badged the Urban Supporter.

All QuickDelivery vans were manufactured at the Honsha plant, Araco Corporation (now Toyota Boshoku Corporation).

It was requested by Yamato Transport for local, final-mile home deliveries, who demanded a car with a high ceiling that does not require the crew to bend down even when working in the car.

== First Generation (100) ==
Toyota Quick Delivery 100
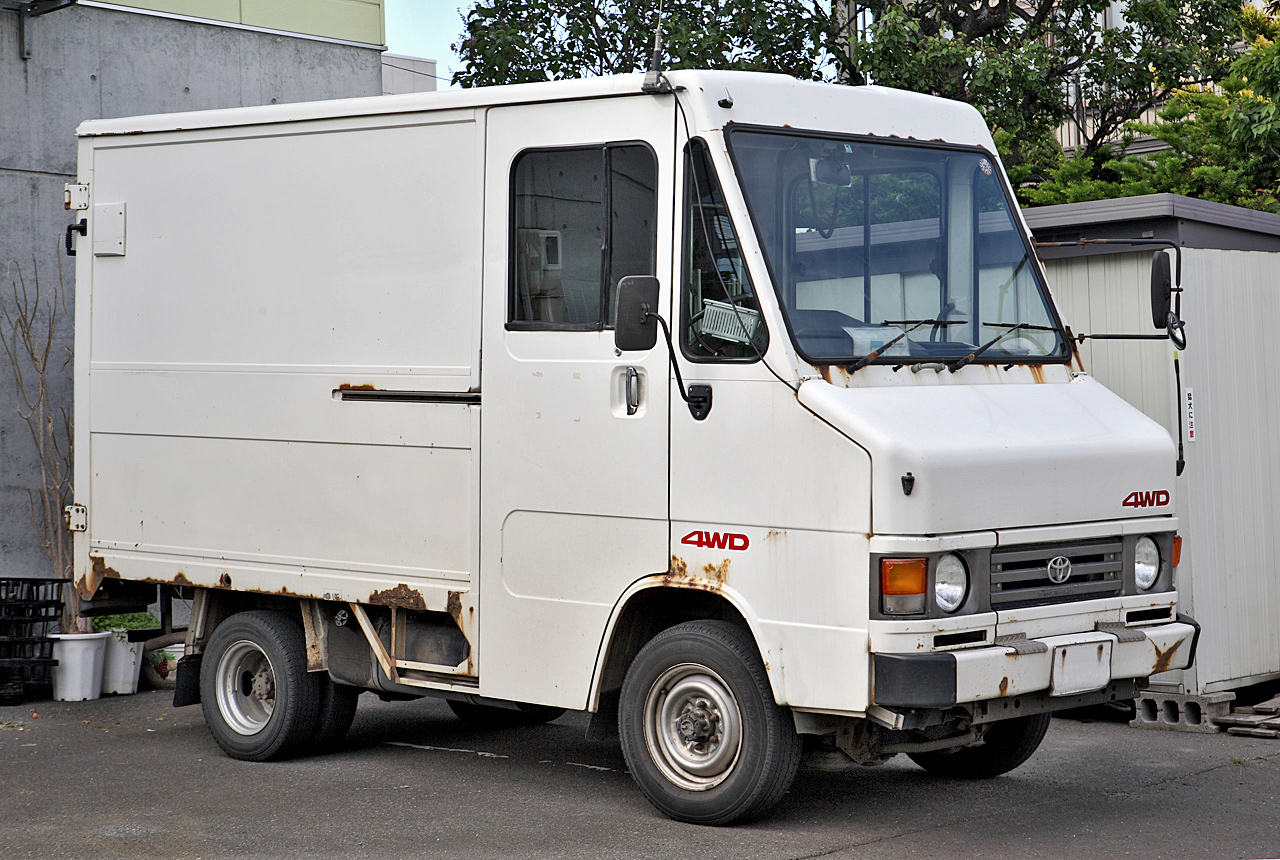
- Toyota Quick Delivery 100 4WD

Overview
- Manufacturer: Toyota
- Production: 1982 - 1986

Body and chassis
- Class: Van
- Body style: Step van
- Layout: All-wheel drive

Powertrain
- Engine: 2,985 cc 5L
- Transmission: 5-speed gearbox

Dimensions
- Wheelbase: 2300 mm
- Length: 4475 mm
- Width: 1690 mm
- Height: 2525
- Curb weight: 1760 kg

Chronology
- Predecessor: Toyota Dyna (U10), Toyota ToyoAce (4th gen), Toyota HiAce (H11/H20/H30/H40)
- Successor: Toyota Quick Delivery 200

The 100 model series began in the second quarter of 1982. The truck allowed a maximum load of 1.25 tons. The First Generation Quick Delivery was only available with permanent all-wheel drive. The vehicle was powered by a 3-liter Hino engine.

== Second Generation (200) ==
Toyota Quick Delivery 200
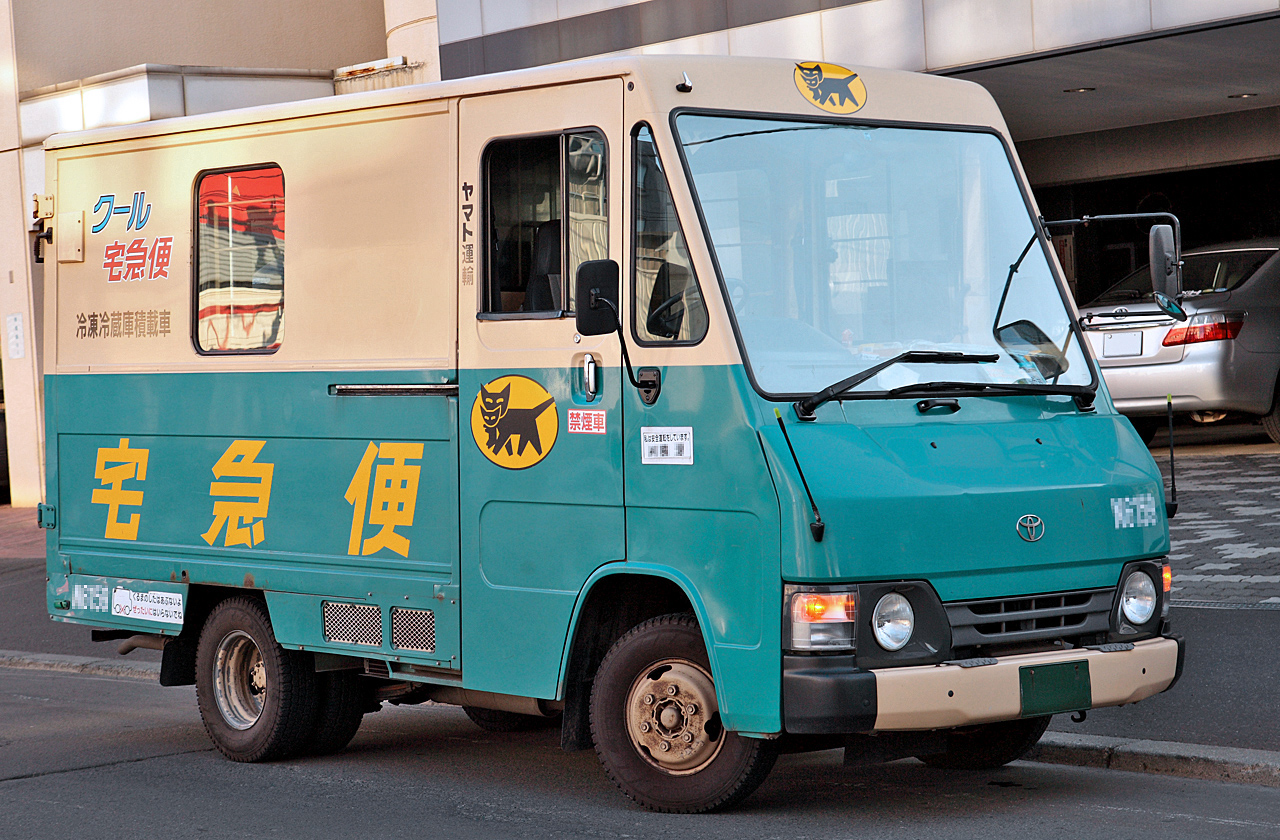

Overview
- Manufacturer: Toyota
- Production: 1986 - 2000

Body and chassis
- Class: Van
- Body style: Step van
- Layout: Rear-wheel drive

Powertrain
- Engine: 2.4 L (2.8 L starting in 1995)
- Transmission: 5-speed gearbox

Dimensions
- Wheelbase: 2500 mm
- Length: 5020 mm
- Width: 1790 mm
- Height: 2610 mm
- Curb weight: 2190 kg

Chronology
- Predecessor: Toyota Quick Delivery 100
- Successor: Toyota Urban Supporter

The Quick Delivery 200 was released in January 1986. With the new version, a total load of up to two tons could now be transported. A Toyota B engine with a displacement of 3.0 liters and a Toyota 3B engine with a displacement of 3.4 liters were available. Due to new emission regulations in 1994, the engines had to be adapted accordingly. At the same time, the interior was also revised and refreshed with new style elements.

For the first time in 1999, the name has now been abbreviated as QD. For the QD200, Toyota uses a 4B engine (diesel engine) with a displacement of 3.7 liters. The QD200 is currently classified as a low-emission vehicle by the Japanese ministries, giving customers tax breaks. Appropriate approval was given by the Ministry of Land and Economy, which awarded the QD200 the environmental prize.

In 2000, Toyota added an LPG variant with a 2.7 liter 3RZ engine to an engine range. However, the diesel has so far remained the more popular version with customers.

== Third generation (1999-2016) ==
Toyota Quick Delivery 200
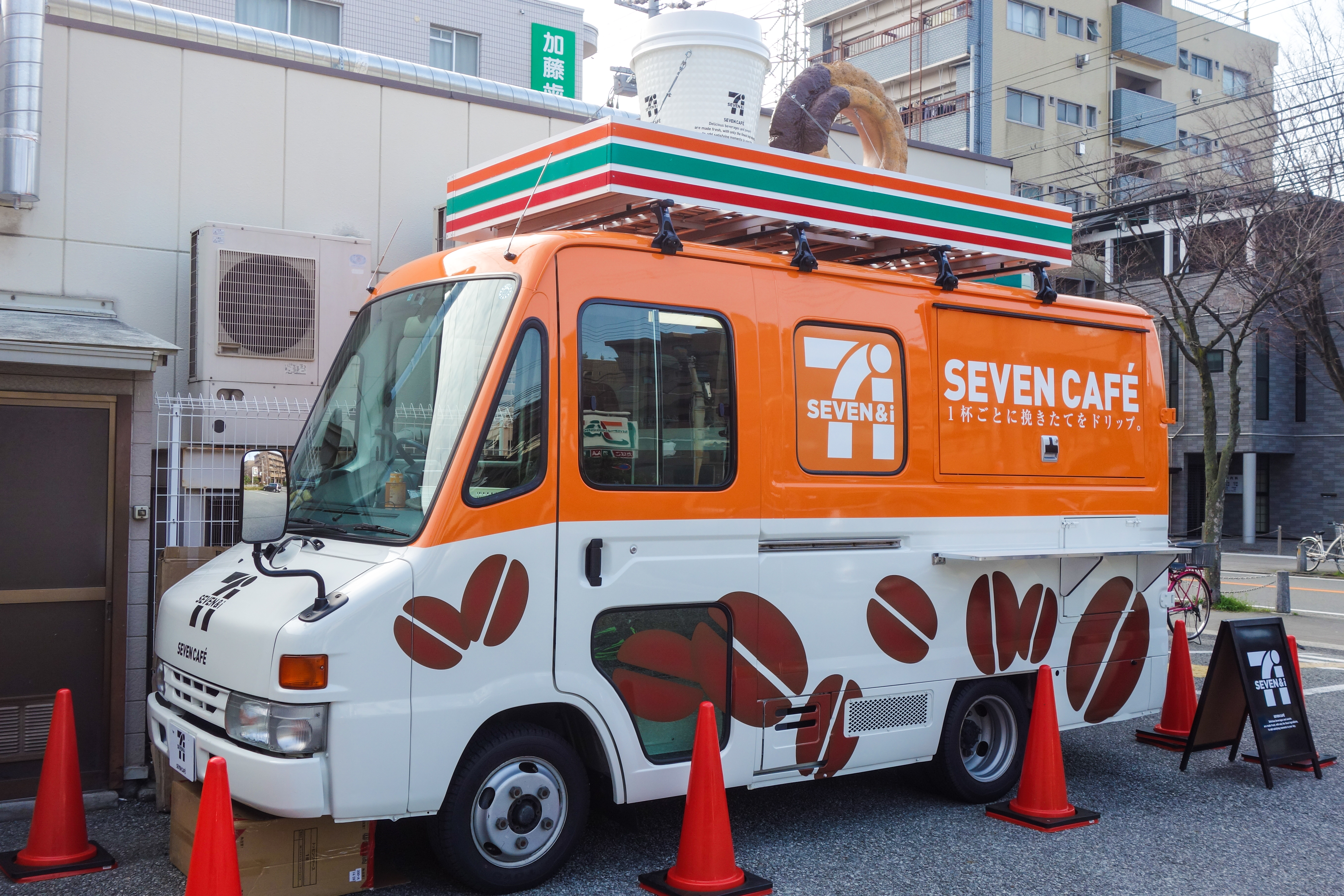

Overview
- Manufacturer: Toyota
- Production: 1999 - 2016

Body and chassis
- Class: Van
- Body style: Step van
- Layout: All-wheel drive

Powertrain
- Engine: 3.7 L 4B I4

Dimensions
- Wheelbase: 2300 mm
- Length: 4640 mm
- Width: 1785 mm
- Height: 2650 mm
- Curb weight: 2080 kg

Chronology
- Predecessor: Toyota Quick Delivery 200

- On August 18, 1999, the 2-ton model was redesigned. The cowl top was lowered, and the front windshield and upper half of the body were given a rounded style. The wheel bolts were changed from six bolts with a PCD of 139.7 mm to five bolts with a PCD of 203.2 mm (wheel hub hole diameter 146 mm). The engine was a 3.66-liter "4B" diesel engine . The shift lever was a column shift like the previous model, but the lever shape was changed so that it could be operated with the feel of a floor shift. There was no automatic transmission.
- The 2-ton load capacity series became a Yamato Transport exclusive model (W vehicle) after 2000, and sales to the general public were discontinued.
- 2000 (Heisei 12): Following on from its predecessor, an LPG model was introduced. The engine was the 2.7L 3RZ -FP model based on the 3RZ model, and Yamato Transport introduced over 2,000 of these.
- A minor change was made on October 25, 2006. The 2-ton series was sold again to the general public, and the vehicle was equipped with a Hino IC turbo diesel engine " N04C type " (direct injection common rail type) that adopted a hybrid system. The only transmission available was a column-shift 5-speed manual . The maximum load capacity of the hybrid vehicle was changed from 2.00 tons to 1.95 tons.
- A minor change was made on September 4, 2007. By changing the final gear, fuel efficiency was improved by 6%, achieving the "Heisei 27 Heavy Vehicle Fuel Efficiency Standards ". It has been certified as a " low-emission vehicle " by the Ministry of Land, Infrastructure, Transport and Tourism, and is eligible for tax reduction measures under the green tax system.
- The suggested retail price was revised on September 1, 2008. It was increased by 157,500 yen (tax included) from the initial minor change.
- On September 1, 2009, Yamato Transport's W vehicle numbers were full, so the next new vehicles to be registered would use the vacant R vehicle numbers. The maximum load capacity was also changed to 1.70 tonnes. A distinctive feature of R vehicles is the addition of orange turn signal lenses to the left and right fenders.
- In 2011, production and sales to the general public ended. Since then, this model was produced exclusively for Yamato Transport.
- In 2016, production of vehicles for Yamato Transport ended.
