= Kiki's Delivery Service (novel) =

1985 children's fantasy novel by Eiko Kadono

Majo no Takkyūbin Kiki's Delivery Service
- Japanese book cover
- Author: Eiko Kadono
- Original title: 魔女の宅急便; Majo no Takkyūbin
- Translator: Lynne E. Riggs (first edition); Emily Balistrieri (second edition)
- Illustrator: Akiko Hayashi
- Cover artist: Akiko Hayashi
- Language: Japanese
- Series: Majo no Takkyūbin
- Genre: Children's, fantasy
- Publisher: Fukuinkan Shoten
- Publication date: January 25, 1985
- Publication place: Japan
- English publication date: February 1, 2003
- Media type: Print (paperback)
- Pages: 259 pp
- ISBN: 4-8340-0119-9
- OCLC: 166865908
- LC Class: MLCSJ 86/174 (P)
- Followed by: Kiki's Delivery Service Book 2: Kiki and the New Magic

Kiki's Delivery Service (魔女の宅急便, Majo no Takkyūbin; lit. 'Witch's Express Home Delivery') is a children's fantasy novel written by Eiko Kadono and illustrated by Akiko Hayashi. It was first published by Fukuinkan Shoten on January 25, 1985. It is the basis of the 1989 Studio Ghibli anime film of the same title and of the 2014 live action film also of the same name.

The book won numerous awards in Japan. Encouraged by this and by the success of the Ghibli film, Kadono has written eight more novels over a period of more than thirty-five years. The most recent was published in January 2022.

== Synopsis ==
The book follows Kiki, a young witch from a long line of witches on her mother's side. Kiki is now thirteen and must spend a year on her own in a town without other witches, proving that she can make a living. Accompanied by her talking black cat Jiji, Kiki starts a delivery service by flying on her broom. Over the year (and eleven chapters) notable misadventures include:

- Losing a stuffed toy cat and using Jiji as a substitute until she can recover the lost toy.
- Saving a child from the ocean during a day at the beach.
- Recovering her broom that has been stolen by a flying enthusiast.
- Posing for a portrait and then delivering it to a town art showing.
- Getting a giant knitted haramaki, or "belly warmer," to a ship out at sea from an eccentric knitting old woman.
- Figuring out what to do when the clock tower breaks down on New Year's Eve.
- Delivering musical instruments to a concert after they were left on a train by a haughty group of musicians.

After a year of self-doubt and some setbacks, Kiki returns home in triumph, but then soon decides to return to the city and her delivery business.

== Development ==
=== Title interpretation ===
The word takkyūbin (宅急便; lit. 'home-fast-mail') in the Japanese title is a trademark of Yamato Transport, though it is used today as a synonym for takuhaibin (宅配便; lit. 'home-delivery-mail'). The company not only approved the use of the trademark—though its permission was not required under Japanese trademark laws—but also enthusiastically sponsored the anime film version of the book, as the company uses a stylized depiction of a black cat carrying her kitten as its corporate logo.

== Translations ==
Non-Japanese versions of Majo no Takkyūbin were not published until 2003 when the book became available in English, Italian, Korean and Chinese. The Swedish and Indonesian editions were published in 2006. The Russian version was released in 2018, the French and Spanish ones in 2019, the Brazilian Portuguese in 2021 and the Hungarian in 2023.

=== Differences in title ===
Not all translations of the book follow the original title. Some include the name of the central character.

- Kiki's Delivery Service (English edition), named for the English dub of the Studio Ghibli film
- Kiki, consegne a domicilio (Italian edition), translates as Kiki, Home Deliveries
- 魔女宅急便 (Mónǚ Zháijíbiàn) (Chinese edition)
- Kikis Expressbud (Swedish edition), translates as Kiki's Fast Delivery
- Titipan Kilat Penyihir (Indonesian edition), translates as Witch's Express Delivery
- Ведьмина служба доставки (Russian edition), translates as Witch's Delivery Service
- Kiki la petite sorcière (French edition), translates as Kiki the Little Witch
- Nicky, la aprendiz de bruja (Spanish edition), translates as Nicky, the Witch Apprentice
- Entregas expressas da Kiki (Brazilian edition), translates as Kiki's Fast Deliveries
- Kiki, a boszorkányfutár (Hungarian edition), translates as Kiki the Witch Courier
- Kiki's vliegende koeriersdienst (Dutch edition), translates as Kiki's Flying Delivery Service

=== English editions ===
The first English edition was translated by Lynne E. Riggs and with a cover by Irvin Cheung, but retaining the original illustrations by Akiko Hayashi. This was released on February 1, 2003 by Annick Press in paperback. A new English translation by Emily Balistrieri, with cover and internal illustrations by Yuta Onoda was released in hardcover by Delacorte Press on July 7, 2020. Another hardcover version, illustrated by Joe Todd-Stanton, was released by Penguin Books under their Puffin Books imprint on August 20, 2020 and in paperback on July 1, 2021. The Yuta Onoda–illustrated version also appeared in paperback under the Yearling Books imprint on June 8, 2021.

== Related media ==
=== Film adaptations ===
The book was adapted as a 1989 animated film by Hayao Miyazaki and Studio Ghibli. Walt Disney Pictures was also interested in its own live-action take on Kiki in 2005 with Jeff Stockwell writing the script and Susan Montford, Don Murphy, and Mark Gordon as producers, but no developments have emerged since then.

A live-action film adaptation was released in 2014, directed by Takashi Shimizu. The film is based on the first two novels and has figure skater turned actress Fuka Koshiba playing Kiki.

=== Stage musicals ===
In 1993, a musical version of the story was produced. Yukio Ninagawa wrote the script and Kensuke Yokouchi directed the show. The role of Kiki was portrayed by Youki Kudoh and the role of Tombo was portrayed by Akira Akasaka. Akasaka was replaced by Katsuyuki Mori within the year. A cast recording was produced by the original cast, and the show was revived in 1995 and 1996.

Another musical, based on the Ghibli's film, ran at the Southwark Playhouse in the United Kingdom from December 8, 2016 to January 8, 2017. It was adapted by Jessica Sian and directed by Katie Hewitt.

In 2017, another musical version was produced, written and directed by Koki Kishimoto. It was revived in 2018 and 2021.

== Sequels ==
Title	Release date ISBN	Notes
Kiki's Delivery Service Book 2: Kiki and the New Magic (魔女の宅急便その2 キキと新しい魔法, Majo no Takkyūbin 2: Kiki to Atarashii Mahō; Witch's Express Home Delivery 2: Kiki and the New Magic)	June 30, 1993; 978-4-8340-1174-6	Contains 16 chapters; Illustrated by Takako Hirono.
Kiki's Delivery Service Book 3: Kiki and the Other Witch (魔女の宅急便その3 キキともうひとりの魔女, Majo no Takkyūbin 3: Kiki to mō Hitori no Majo; Witch's Express Home Delivery 3: Kiki and the Other Witch)	October 20, 2000; 978-4-8340-1704-5	Contains 12 chapters; Illustrated by Miho Satake.
Majo no Takkyūbin 4: Kiki no Koi (魔女の宅急便その4 キキの恋, Witch's Express Home Delivery 4: Kiki's Love)	March 10, 2004; 978-4-8340-0586-8	Contains 10 chapters; Illustrated by Miho Satake.
Majo no Takkyūbin 5: Mahō no Tomarigi (魔女の宅急便その5 魔法の止まり木, Witch's Express Home Delivery 5: Perch of Magic)	May 9, 2007; 978-4-8340-2263-6	Contains 9 chapters; Illustrated by Miho Satake.
Majo no Takkyūbin 6: Sorezore no Tabidachi (魔女の宅急便その6 それぞれの旅立ち, Witch's Express Home Delivery 6: Each and Every Departure)	October 7, 2009; 978-4-8340-2466-1	Contains 19 chapters; Illustrated by Miho Satake.
Majo no Takkyūbin Tokubetsu-hen: Kiki ni Deatta Hitobito (魔女の宅急便 特別編 キキに出会った人びと, Witch's Express Home Delivery Special Edition: People who Met Kiki)	January 25, 2016; 978-4-8340-8236-4	Contains 4 chapters; Illustrated by Miho Satake.
Majo no Takkyūbin Tokubetsu-hen 2: Kiki to Jiji (魔女の宅急便 特別編その2 キキとジジ, Witch's Express Home Delivery Special Edition 2: Kiki and Jiji)	May 25, 2017; 978-4-8340-8338-5	Contains 7 chapters; Illustrated by Miho Satake.
Majo no Takkyūbin Tokubetsu-hen 3: Keke to Hanbun Majo (魔女の宅急便 特別編その3 ケケと半分魔女, Witch's Express Home Delivery Special Edition 3: Keke and the Half Witch)	January 15, 2022; 978-4-8340-8643-0	Contains 6 chapters; Illustrated by Miho Satake.

== Awards and nominations ==
- 23rd Noma Award for Juvenile Literature, 1985
- 34th Shogakukan Award for Children's Literature
- Hans Christian Andersen Award, 2018
- Holds a place on the IBBY Honour List for 1986
