= Chihiro =

- Pronunciation: /tʃəˈhɪəroʊ/

Origin
- Origin: Japanese
- Meaning: Varies depending on kanji used

Chihiro (ちひろ, チヒロ,千尋) is a unisex Japanese given name.

== Written forms ==
Chihiro can be written using various kanji, which can alter the name's meaning:

- 千尋, "thousand fathoms"
- 千博, "thousand gains"
- 千裕, "thousand, abundance"
- 千紘, "thousand, large or huge"

The name can also be rendered in hiragana and katakana as ちひろ and チヒロ respectively.

== People ==
- Chihiro Amano (天野 千尋; born 1982), Japanese film director and screenwriter
- Chihiro Anai (穴井 千尋; born 1996), Japanese former member of the idol group HKT48
- Chihiro Fujioka (藤岡 千尋; born 1959), Japanese video game designer and composer
- Chihiro Hamana (浜名 千広; born 1969), Japanese former Baseball infielder
- Chihiro Hashimoto (橋本 千紘; born 1992), Japanese professional wrestler
- Chihiro Idō (井道 千尋; born 1988), Japanese shogi player
- Chihiro Igarashi (五十嵐 千尋; born 1995), Japanese swimmer
- Chihiro Ishida (石田 千尋; born 2001), Japanese professional footballer
- Chihiro Ishiguro (石黒 千尋), Japanese voice actress
- Chihiro Iwasaki (岩崎 知弘; 1918–1974), Japanese artist and illustrator
- Chihiro Kameyama (亀山 千広; born 1956), Japanese businessman
- Chihiro Kaneko (金子 千尋; born 1983), Japanese baseball player
- Chihiro Kato (footballer) (加藤 千尋; born 1998), Japanese footballer
- Chihiro Kato (volleyball) (加藤 千尋; born 1988), Japanese volleyball player
- Chihiro Kawakami (川上 千尋; born 1998), Japanese voice actress
- Chihiro Kitada (北田 千尋; born 1989), Japanese wheelchair basketball player
- Chihiro Kondo (近藤 千尋; born 1989), Japanese fashion model
- Chihiro Kusaka (日下 ちひろ; born 1978), Japanese voice actress
- Chihiro Minato (港 千尋; born 1960), Japanese photographer
- Chihiro Muramatsu (村松 千裕; born 1998), Japanese tennis player
- Chihiro Nakagawa (中川 智尋; born 2007), Japanese idol of the group Sakurazaka46
- Chihiro Nakajima (中島 千博; born 1994), Japanese karateka and kickboxer
- Chihiro Noda (野田 智裕; born 1988), Japanese footballer
- Chihiro Onitsuka (鬼束 ちひろ; born 1980), Japanese singer-songwriter and pianist
- Chihiro Otsuka (大塚 ちひろ; born 1986), Japanese actress
- Chihiro Oyagi (大八木 千尋; born 1963), Japanese gymnast
- Chihiro Sakamoto (坂本 千尋; born 1994), Japanese woman cricketer
- Chihiro Sakurano (櫻野 ちひろ; born 1998), Japanese former idol of the group Yumemiru Adolescence
- Chihiro Sasakawa (笹川 千尋; born 1948), Japanese bacteriologist
- Chihiro Sawada (澤田 千優; born 1997), Japanese mixed martial artist and former wrestler
- Chihiro Sumida (隅田 知一郎; born 1999), Japanese professional baseball pitcher
- Chihiro Suzuki (鈴木 千尋; born 1977), Japanese voice actor
- Chihiro Suzuki (ice hockey) (鈴木 千尋; born 2002), Japanese ice hockey player
- Chihiro Suzuki (martial artist) (鈴木 千裕; born 1999), Japanese kickboxer and mixed martial artist
- Chihiro Yamamoto (山本 千尋; born 1996), Japanese actress
- Chihiro Yamanaka (山中 千尋) Japanese jazz pianist and composer
- Chihiro Yonekura (米倉 千尋; born 1972), Japanese singer
- Yuki Chihiro (勇気ちひろ), Japanese VTuber

== Fictional characters ==
- Chihiro Ayasato (绫里 千尋), a character in Phoenix Wright: Ace Attorney (Mia Fey in the localisation)
- Chihiro Ogino (荻野 千尋), the main character in Spirited Away
- Chihiro Sengoku, monster teacher from The Pet Girl of Sakurasou
- Chihiro (千尋), a secondary character in Azumanga Daioh
- Chihiro Shindou (千尋), a main character in Ef: A Fairy Tale of the Two.
- Chihiro Fujimi, a Oh My Goddess! character
- Chihiro Furuya, the main character in Sankarea
- Chihiro Fushimi, a secondary character in Persona 3
- Chihiro Kosaka (ちひろ), a heroine in The World God Only Knows
- Chihiro Itou, a character from Suki Desu Suzuki-kun!!
- Chihiro Fujisaki (不二咲 千尋), a character featured in Danganronpa: Trigger Happy Havoc
- Chihiro Mayuzumi (千尋), a secondary character in Kuroko's Basketball
- Chihiro Sawaki (澤木 千尋), a secondary character in Rich Man, Poor Woman
- Chihiro (千尋), a main character in Kamen Rider Amazons
- Chihiro Usui (碓井千紘), member of RayGlanZ in the game Readyyy! Project
- Chihiro Rokuhira (六平チヒロ), main character in Kagurabachi
- Chihiro Kagami (各務 チヒロ), a character from the role-playing game Blue Archive

== Music ==
- "Chihiro", a 2024 song by Billie Eilish, based on the Spirited Away character.

== See also ==
- Sega Chihiro is an arcade system from Sega based on the architecture of the Xbox
