= Patricia Lee Gauch =

American writer

Patricia Lee Gauch (born January 3, 1934) is an author who has written over 30 works of children's literature. In 1993, Gauch was inducted into the New Jersey Literary Hall of Fame. She has been a resident of the Basking Ridge section of Bernards Township, New Jersey. She was also publisher of Philomel Books, an imprint of Penguin Books USA.

== Books ==
Her books include My Old Tree (New York: Coward-McCann. 1970), Christina Katerina & the Box (New York: Putnam & Grosset. 1971)and "The stone soup".
