= Philomel Books =

Imprint of Penguin Books US

- Parent company: Penguin Group
- Founder: Ann Beneduce
- Country of origin: United States
- Headquarters location: New York City
- Official website: penguin.com/publishers/philomel/

Philomel Books is a children's literature imprint of Penguin Books USA. The imprint was founded by Ann Beneduce, who was succeeded as publisher by Patricia Lee Gauch.

Philomel publishes the series of children's books The Ranger's Apprentice by John Flanagan and the Alex Rider series by Anthony Horowitz. The imprint also published notable picture books including The Day the Crayons Quit and The Very Hungry Caterpillar.
