= Chihiro Sasakawa =

Japanese bacteriologist (born 1948)

Chihiro Sasakawa (笹川 千尋, Sasakawa Chihiro; born January 1948) is a Japanese bacteriologist well known for his pioneering research into the invasive mechanisms of pathogenic bacteria and the host’s subsequent immune response to infection. In his work on Shigella species and Helicobacter pylori, Sasakawa was an early adopter of a multi-disciplinary research strategy, combining molecular biology, cellular biology, biochemistry and immunological approaches. This research strategy and his discoveries greatly influenced later research on the invasive mechanisms of other pathogenic bacteria.

== Biography ==
Sasakawa was born in 1948 in Tokyo. He graduated from the Faculty of Science at Chiba University in 1972, and obtained his doctorate from the Graduate school of Medicine, the University of Tokyo in 1978. Following research stints at the Institute of Medical Science, the University of Tokyo (1978-1980) and the Washington University School of Medicine as an NIH Fogarty Fellow (1980-1983), he became an associate professor at the Institute of Medical Science, the University of Tokyo, becoming a full professor in 1995. He also concurrently held the position of professor at the Osaka University Research Institute for Microbial Diseases from 1998 to 2001. Sasakawa retired from the University of Tokyo in 2012 and is currently a professor emeritus of the University of Tokyo. He is currently the Director of Chiba University Medical Mycology Research Center (2013 to present) and Nippon Institute for Biological Science (2012 to present).

== Contribution ==
In the field of bacteriology, Sasakawa’s work has shed light on many fundamental principles underlying the infectious process of highly pathogenic bacteria and the role of the host’s natural immune response in defending against infection. Utilizing model species such as Shigella and Helicobacter, he elucidated the pathogen-host interaction in a holistic manner that encompassed molecular biology, cellular biology, biochemistry and immunology, thereby significantly contributing to the creation of the discipline of “Infection Biology”.

== Honors and awards ==
Sasakawa has been the recipient of numerous prizes and awards, including the highly prestigious Government of Japan (Medal with Purple Ribbon):

- 1995: Kobayashi Rokuzo Award (Japanese Society for Microbiology)
- 1998: Hideyo Noguchi Memorial Award for Medical Sciences
- 2006: Takeda Medical Award
- 2012: Asakawa Award (Japanese Society for Microbiology)
- 2012: Medal with Purple Ribbon (Medals of Honor (Japan), Government of Japan)
- 2021: Order of the Sacred Treasure, Gold Rays with Neck Ribbon (Government of Japan)

== Editorial board activities ==
Sasakawa currently serves on the editorial board of multiple leading scientific journals.

- Cell Host Microbe (2007 to 2019)
- Nature Review Microbiology (2003 to present)
- Trends in Microbiology (1999 to present)
- Current Opinion in Microbiology (2002 to present)
- Cellular Microbiology (1998 to present)
- Molecular Microbiology (1995-2002)
- Microbes and Infection (1999-2002).

== Leadership of scientific societies ==
Sasakawa was the Chairman of the Japanese Society for Bacteriology from 2006 to 2008 and currently serves as General Director of the Federation of Microbiological Societies of Japan (since 2012).

== Books (in English) ==
- Molecular Medical Microbiology (ed., M. Sussman), Academic Press, 2002, pp. 645–668.
- Methods in Enzymology, Elsevier Science, 2002, 358: 385-392.
- Bacterial Invasion of Host Cells (ed., R. Lamont), Cambridge University Press, 2004, 25-57

== Publications ==
- Sasakawa, C. et al. Infect Immun 51, 470-5 (1986).
- Sasakawa, C. et al. J Bacteriol 175, 2334-46 (1993).
- Suzuki, T., Lett, M. C. & Sasakawa, J Biol Chem 270, 30874-80 (1995).
- Watarai, M., Funato, S. & Sasakawa, J Exp Med 183, 991-9 (1996).
- Suzuki, T., Miki, H., Takenawa, T. & Sasakawa, C. EMBO J 17, 2767-76 (1998).
- Tamano, K. et al. EMBO J 19, 3876-87 (2000).
- Tatsuno, I. et al. Infect Immun 69, 6660-9 (2001).
- Mimuro, H. et al. Mol Cell 10, 745-55 (2002).
- Tanaka, J., Suzuki, T., Mimuro, H. & Sasakawa, Cell Microbiol 5, 395-404 (2003).
- Ogawa, M. et al. Science 307, 727-31 (2005).
- Suzuki, M. et al. J Exp Med 202, 1235-47 (2005).
- Yoshida, S. et al. Science 314, 985-9 (2006).
- Suzuki, T. et al. PLoS Pathog 3, e111 (2007).
- Iwai, H. et al. Cell 130, 611-23 (2007).
- Ogawa, M. et al. Nat Rev Microbiol 6, 11-6 (2008).
- Kim, M. et al. Nature 459, 578-82 (2009).
- Yoshikawa, Y. et al. Nat Cell Biol 11, 1233-40 (2009).
- Ashida, H., Ogawa, M., Kim, M., Mimuro, H. & Sasakawa, C. Nat Chem Biol 8, 36-45 (2011).
- Sanada, T. et al. Nature 483, 623-6 (2012).
- Fukumatsu M, et al. Cell Host Microbe. 11(4):325-36. doi: 10.1016 (2012).
- Kobayashi T, et al. Cell Host Microbe. 13(5):570-83. doi:10.1016 (2013).
- Ashida H, et al. Nat Rev Microbiol, 12(6): 399-413. doi: 10.1038 (2014).
- Kiga K, et al. Nat Communication, 5:4497. doi: 10.1038 (2014).
- Suzuki S, et al. Proc Natl Acad Sci USA. 111(40): E4254-63 (2014)
- Jo EK, et al. Cell Mol Immunol. 13(2):148-59. doi: 10.1038/cmi.2015.95 (2016).
- Suzuki S, et al. EMBO Rep. 19(1): 89-101. doi: 10.15252/embr.20164384 (2018).
- Ashida H, et al. EMBO J. 39(17): e104469. doi: 10.15252/embj.2020104469 (2020).
- Ashida H, et al. Curr Opin Microbiol. 59:1-7. doi: 10.1016/j.mib.2020.07.007 (2020).
- Rimbara E, et al. Proc Natl Acad Sci USA. 30;118(13): e2026337118 (2021).
