= Yamato Transport =

Japanese delivery service company

Yamato Holdings Co., Ltd.
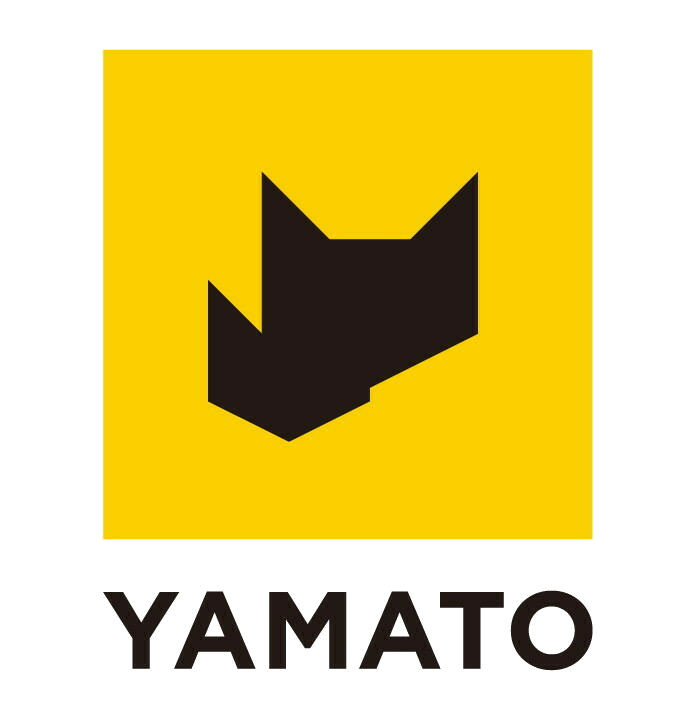
- One of two logos used since 2021

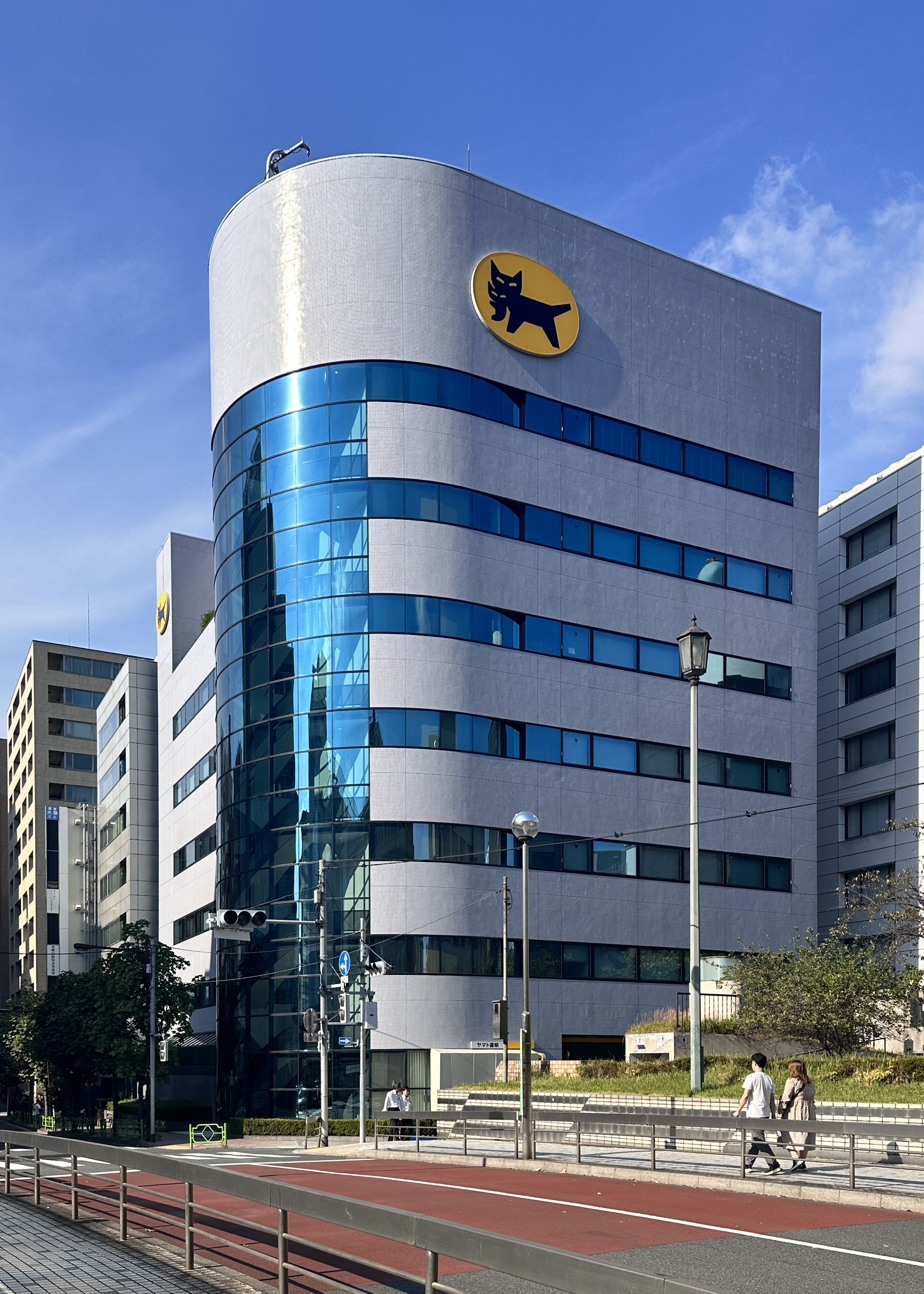
- Headquarters in Chuo, Tokyo
- Native name: ヤマトホールディングス株式会社
- Romanized name: Yamato Hōrudingusu kabushiki gaisha
- Type: Public KK
- Traded as: TYO: 9064
- Industry: Courier
- Founded: 1919; 107 years ago
- Headquarters: Ginza, Chūō, Tokyo, Japan
- Key people: Toshizo Kurisu, President
- Revenue: JP¥ 1,625,315 million (2019)
- Operating income: JP¥ 58,345 million (2019)
- Net income: JP¥ 54,259 million (2019)
- Total assets: JP¥ 1,123,659 million (2019)
- Total equity: JP¥ 565,841 million (2019)
- Number of employees: 171,888 (2018)
- Website: www.kuronekoyamato.co.jp

The Yamato Transport Company, Ltd. (ヤマト運輸株式会社, Yamato Un'yu kabushiki gaisha; YTC) is one of Japan's largest door-to-door delivery service companies, with a market share of 41%, competing closely with Japan Post Service, Sagawa Express, and Nippon Express. Their head office is in Ginza, Tokyo. The company's trademarked term for their express door-to-door delivery service, TA-Q-BIN (宅急便, takkyūbin) was used, with permission, in the original Japanese title of Kiki's Delivery Service (魔女の宅急便, Majo no Takkyūbin; lit. 'Witch's Express Home Delivery') (in which Yamato is a co-producer) instead of the generic term takuhaibin (宅配便). Takkyūbin is sometimes used in Japan as a generic term for all express home delivery services, but the company defends the trademark to avoid it becoming genericized.

The company's logo is a yellow oval with a black cat carrying her kitten in her mouth, symbolizing the company's promise that they take care of items entrusted to them as though the items were their own family. The company is often colloquially referred to as 黒ねこ (Kuroneko) which means "black cat" in Japanese. The logo was developed by founder Yasuomi Ogura.

Yamato Transport has a business alliance with United Parcel Service (UPS), and in principle, UPS packages arriving in Japan will be delivered by Yamato Transport.

== Gallery ==
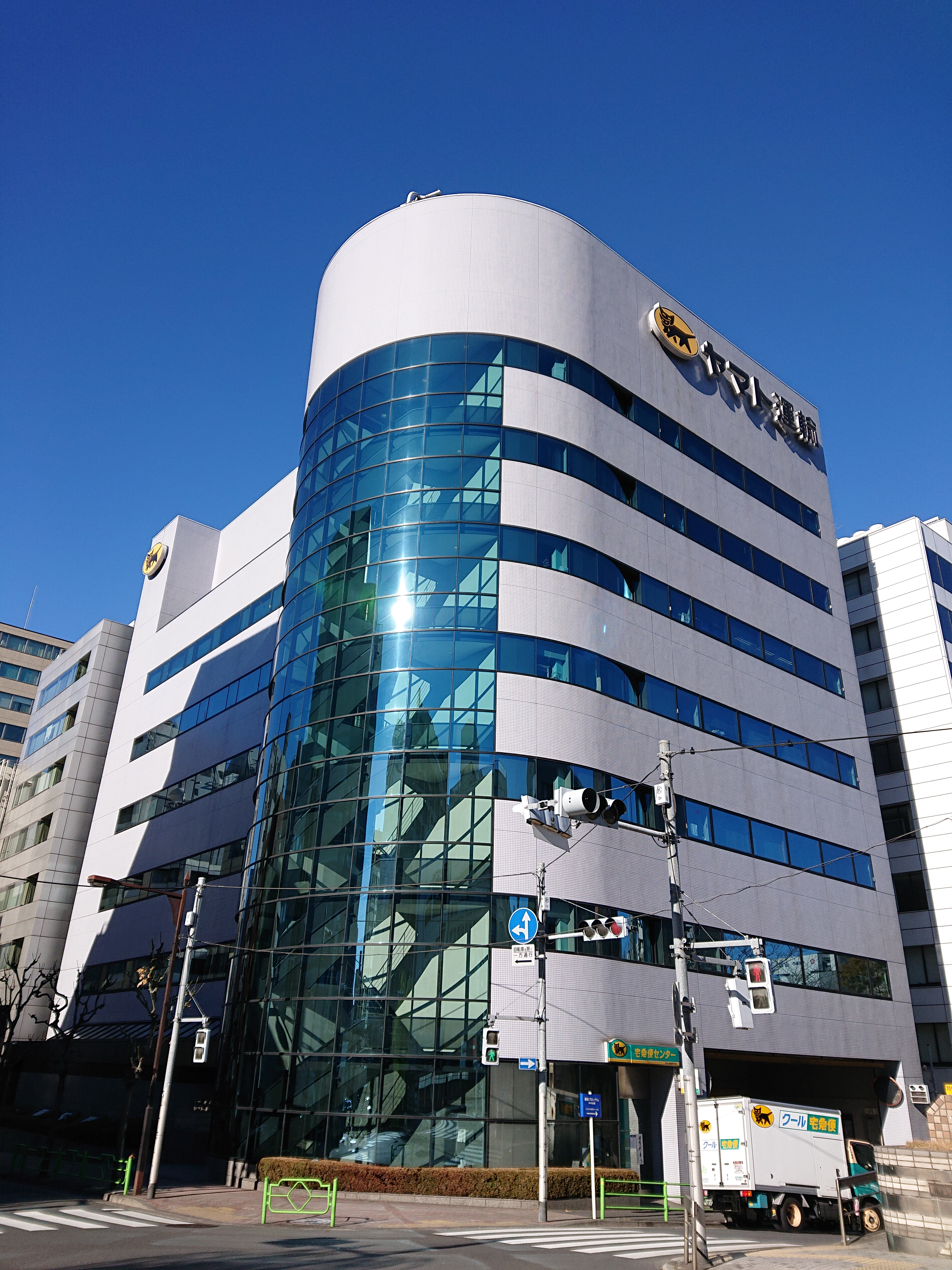
The headquarters of Yamato Holdings and Yamato Transport.

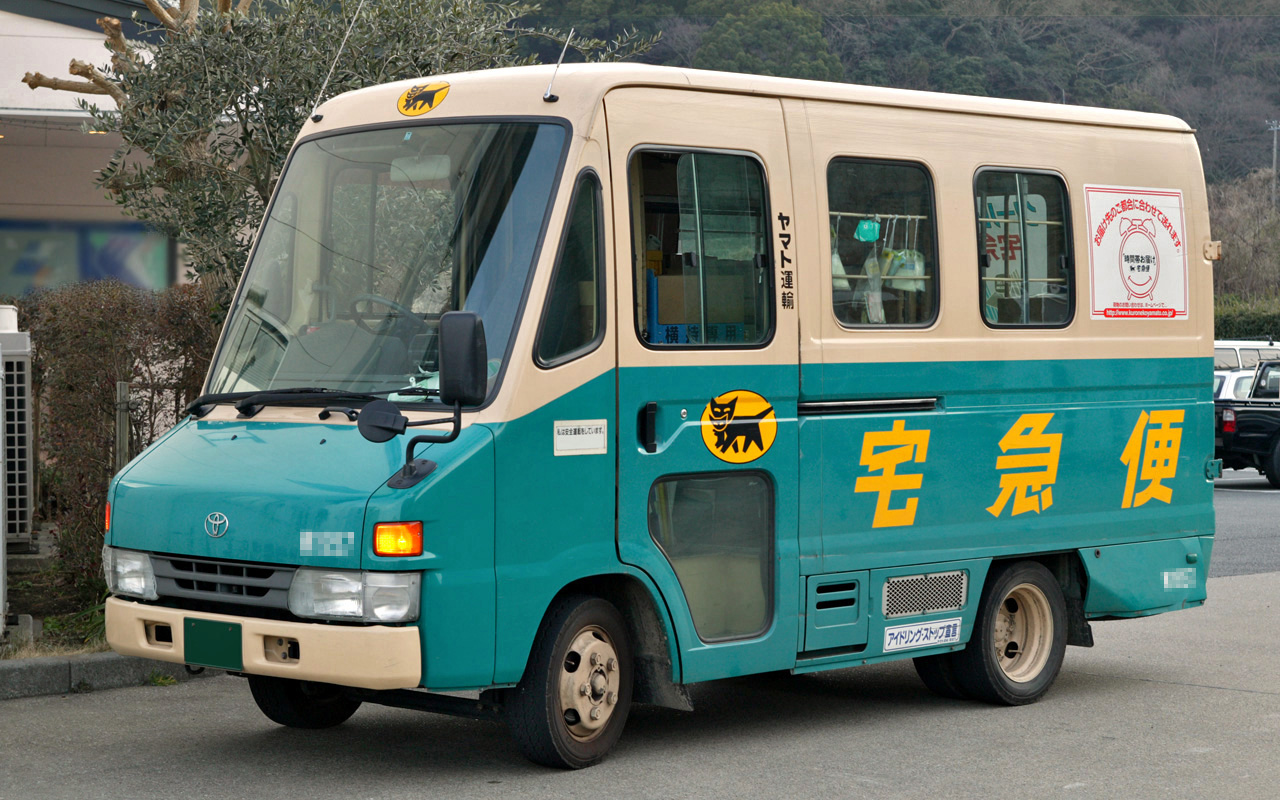
A Yamato Toyota QuickDelivery delivery truck.

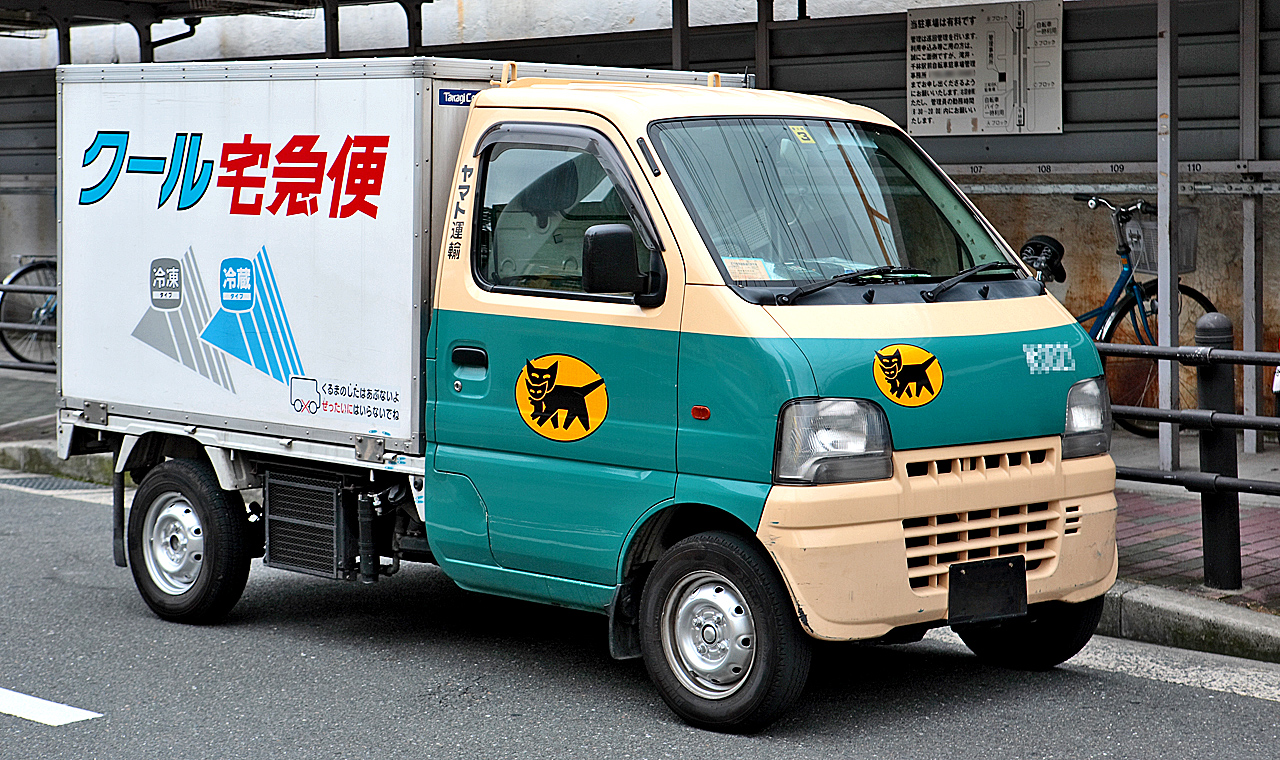
A Yamato Suzuki Carry delivery truck.

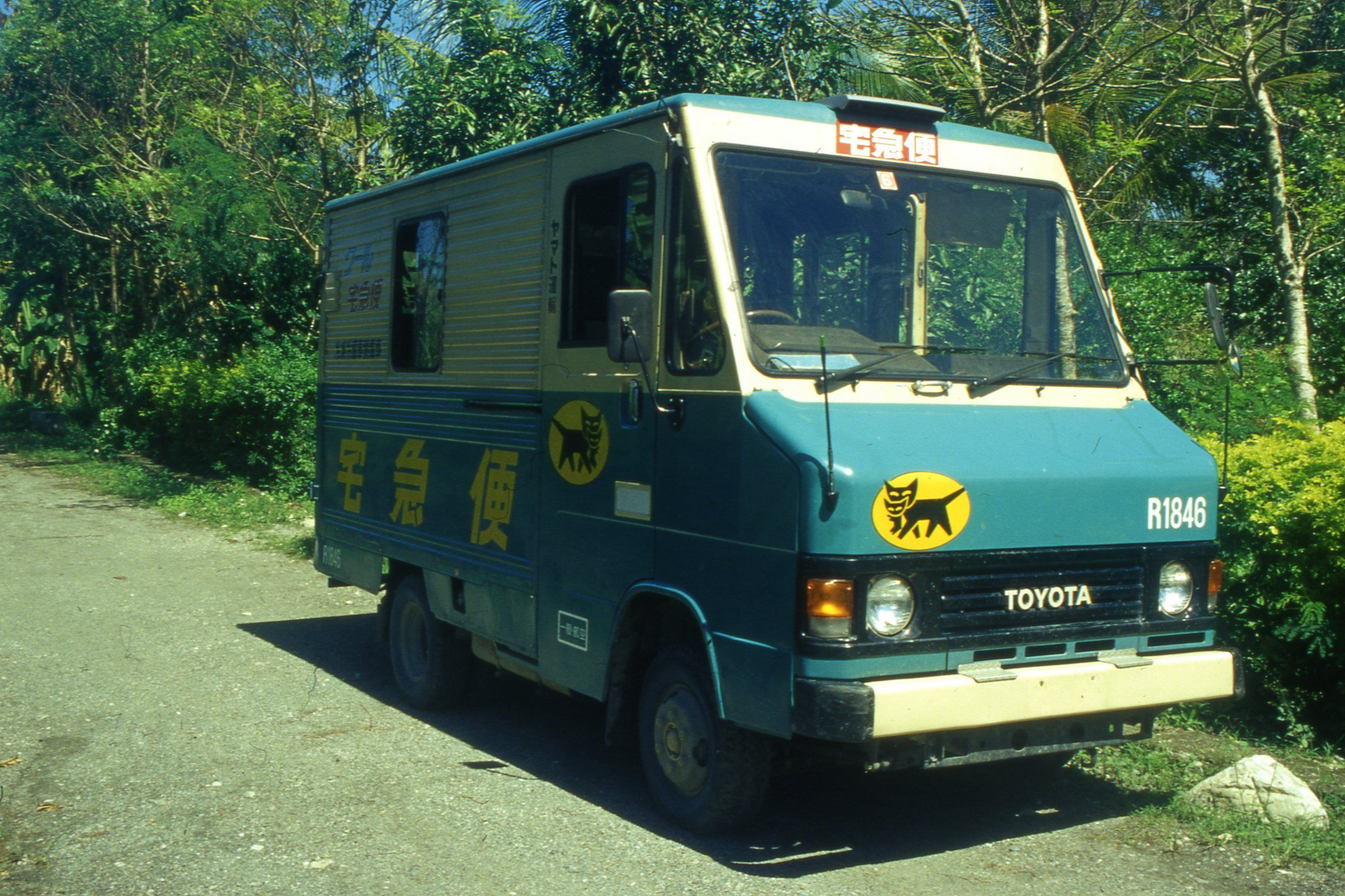
Yamato Transport bus donated to East Timor; used as school bus.

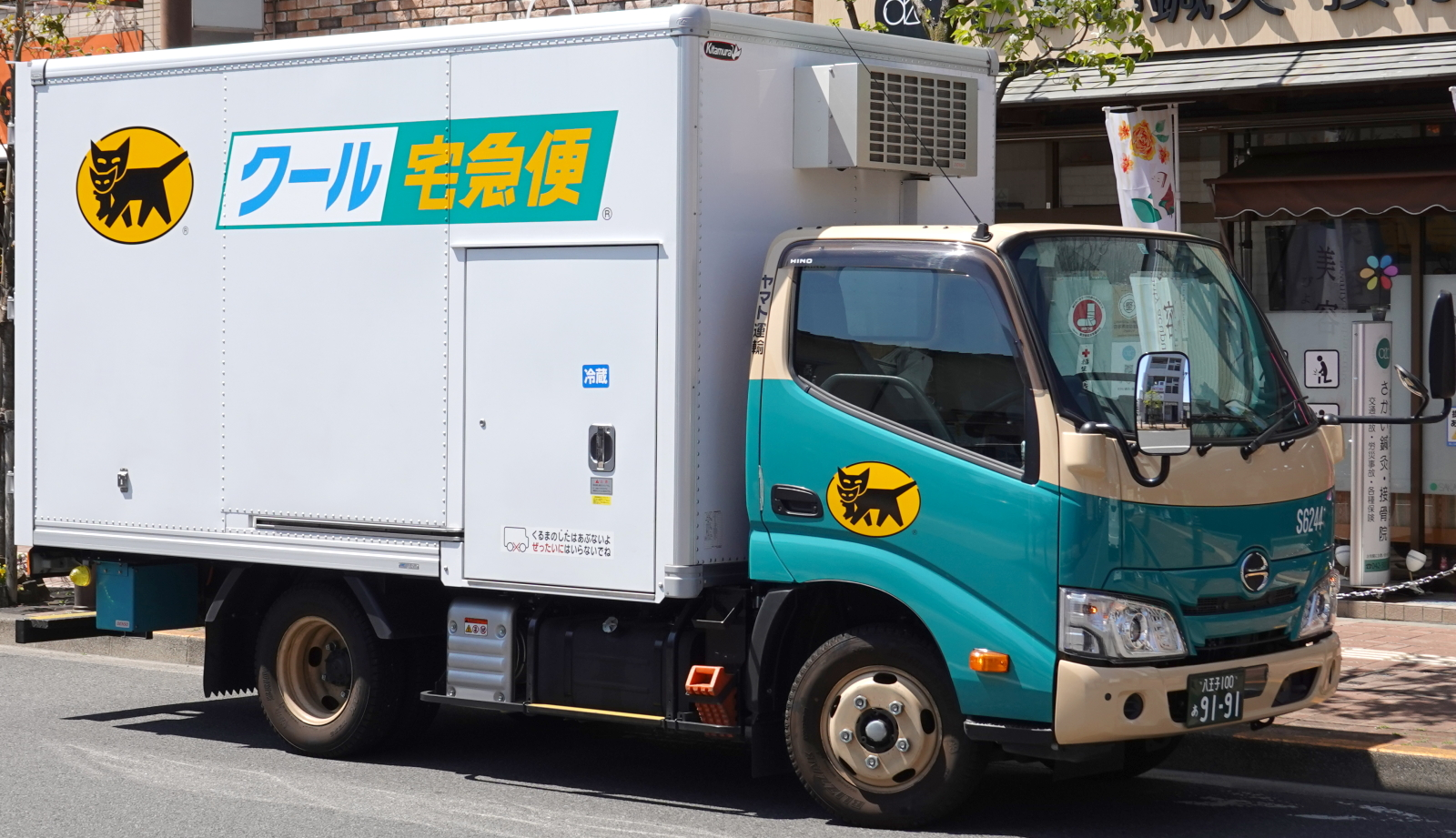
A Yamato Hino Dutro refrigerated delivery truck.
