= Power Rangers =

American media franchise

- Created by: Haim Saban; Shuki Levy; Toei Company
- Original work: Mighty Morphin Power Rangers (1993–1996)
- Owners: Hasbro; Toei Company
- Years: 1993–present
- Based on: Super Sentai

Print publications
- Books: List of books
- Comics: List of comics

Films and television
- Films: List of films
- Television series: List of television series

Theatrical presentations
- Play: Mighty Morphin Power Rangers: World Tour Live on Stage

Games
- Traditional: Power Rangers Collectible Card Game; Power Rangers: Heroes of the Grid
- Video games: List of video games

Audio
- Soundtracks: Mighty Morphin Power Rangers: The Album – A Rock Adventure; Mighty Morphin Power Rangers: The Movie; Turbo: A Power Rangers Movie; Best of Power Rangers: Songs from the TV Series; Power Rangers; Mighty Morphin Power Rangers: Once & Always
- Original music: "Go Go Power Rangers" "Power Rangers: The Official Single"

Miscellaneous
- Toys: List of toys

Power Rangers is an American media franchise built around a superhero television series. The first Power Rangers entry, Mighty Morphin Power Rangers, produced by Saban Entertainment, debuted on August 28, 1993. It became a hit, with high viewer ratings and toy sales, and helped not only to establish the franchise but also earned it a place in contemporary pop culture.

The Power Rangers television series adapts characters and footage from the Japanese tokusatsu franchise Super Sentai for Western audiences, while also incorporating its own stories and characters. The original series ran for 30 seasons, which aired from 1993 to 2023, and it has expanded into other media, including theatrical films, comic books, novels and video games. There have been two attempts to revive the franchise for television since 2020 but neither came to fruition.

Despite initial criticism from some parents and media watchdogs that its violent action was unsuitable for a show which was intended to be viewed by children, the franchise has been commercially successful. By 2001, the media franchise had generated over $6 billion in toy sales.

In 2018, Bandai parted ways with Power Rangers, and the franchise was subsequently acquired by American toy company Hasbro. Toei Company handles the brand in certain Asian markets, including Japan. It is also one of the highest-grossing media franchises.

== Premise ==
Since Power Rangers derives most of its footage from the Super Sentai series, it features many hallmarks that distinguish it from other superhero series. Each series revolves around a team of youths recruited and trained by a mentor to morph into the eponymous Power Rangers, able to use special powers and pilot immense assault machines, called Zords, to overcome the periodic antagonists. In the original series Mighty Morphin, the wizard Zordon recruits "teenagers with attitude" against Rita Repulsa.

When "morphed," the rangers become powerful superheroes wearing color-coded skin-tight spandex suits and helmets with opaque visors; identical except in individual rangers' color, helmet design, and minor styling such as incorporating a skirt. Morphed Rangers generally possess enhanced strength, durability, agility and combat prowess. Some possess superhuman or psychic abilities such as super-speed, element manipulation, extra-sensory perception or invisibility. In addition, each individual ranger has a unique weapon, as well as common weaponry used for ground fighting. (Note: As the series progresses, one or more of the Rangers will usually receive motorcycles for long-distance travel, as well as individual Zords. In many series, a Ranger is also given additional Zords or weapons. In some cases, one Ranger may receive something that other Rangers do not; an example is the Battlizer given to the Red Ranger of each series since Power Rangers in Space (until Operation Overdrive).) When enemies grow to incredible size (as nearly all do), Rangers use individual Zords that combine into a larger Megazord.

Rangers teams operate in teams of three to five, with more Rangers joining the team later. Each team of Rangers, with a few exceptions, obeys a general set of conventions, outlined at the beginning of Mighty Morphin and implied by mentors throughout many of the other series: Power Rangers may not use their Ranger powers for personal gain or for escalating a fight (unless the enemy does so), nor may the Power Rangers disclose their identities to the general public. (Note: Public servants (rescue squad, police officers, etc.) appearing as Rangers disregard this convention in Power Rangers Lightspeed Rescue, Power Rangers S.P.D., Power Rangers Operation Overdrive and Power Rangers RPM.) The penalty for disobeying these rules is the loss of their power.

As in Super Sentai, the color palette of each Power Rangers team changes every series. (Note: An original Power Ranger, the Titanium Ranger, was created especially for Lightspeed Rescue to add a sixth Power Ranger to the series.) Only Red and Blue appear in every Ranger team. Other colors and designations also appear throughout the series. (Note: Other color designations include metallic colors, violet, and "Shadow", as well as protagonists who have powers and costumes similar to those of the Rangers but are not called "Power Rangers", such as the Blue Senturion and Magna Defender.) A Rangers' color designation also influences their wardrobe throughout the series: civilian clothing often matches Ranger color. (Note: A joke highlighted this correlation in Dino Thunder when Tommy Oliver (a former Green Ranger, White Ranger, and Red Ranger) became the new Black Ranger; he said that he had to go shopping because he did not own enough black-colored clothing.)

== History ==
=== Adapting the Super Sentai series ===
The idea of adapting Sentai series for America emerged in the late 1970s after the agreement between Toei Company and Marvel Comics to exchange concepts to adapt them to their respective audiences. Toei, with Marvel Productions, created the Japanese Spider-Man television series, and produced three Super Sentai series, which had great success in Japan. Marvel and Stan Lee tried to sell the Sun Vulcan series to American television stations including HBO, but found no buyers and the agreement ended.

Several years later, another idea to adapt Super Sentai began in the 1980s when Haim Saban made a business trip to Japan, in which, during his stay at the hotel, the only thing that was being transmitted on his television was the Japanese series Choudenshi Bioman. At the time, Saban was fascinated by the concept of five people masked in spandex suits fighting monsters, so in 1985, he produced the pilot episode of Bio-Man, an American adaptation of Choudenshi Bioman, which was rejected by several of the largest American television stations. His idea only took off in 1992, as Saban came to Fox Kids, whose president Margaret Loesch had previously helmed Marvel Productions and thus was familiar with Super Sentai.

Production of Power Rangers episodes involves extensive localization of and revision of original Super Sentai source material to incorporate American culture and conform to American television standards. Rather than making an English dub or translation of the Japanese footage, Power Rangers programs consist of scenes featuring English-speaking actors spliced with scenes featuring either Japanese actors dubbed into English or the action scenes from the Super Sentai Series featuring the Rangers fighting monsters or the giant robot (Zord and Megazord) battles with English dubbing. In some series, original fight scenes are filmed to incorporate characters or items unique to the Power Rangers production.

Like many of Saban Entertainment's previous ventures in localizing Japanese television for a Western audience, the plot, character names, and other names usually differ greatly from the source footage, though a few seasons have stayed close to the story of the original Super Sentai season. The American arm of Bandai, who co-produced the Sentai shows and manufactured its toys, worked with the adaptation of the Japanese names.

A brainstorming among executives led to "Power Rangers", and for the specific show that would be made, Mighty Morphin Power Rangers, evoking the transformation sequences. The meeting also brought up the term "Zord" for the giant robots, to invoke both the sword that the Megazord carried, and the dinosaurs that were the team's theme.

Along with adapting the villains from the Super Sentai counterparts, most Power Rangers series also feature villains with no Sentai counterpart. Generally, the primary antagonist of a Power Rangers series (for example, Lord Zedd, Divatox, etc.) are not adapted from the Sentai. Exceptions to this includes Zeo, Lightspeed Rescue and a few others which only use villains adapted from the Japanese shows.

The franchise began with Mighty Morphin Power Rangers (an American adaptation of the 1992 Japanese Super Sentai Series, Kyōryū Sentai Zyuranger), which began broadcasting as part of the Fox Broadcasting Company's Fox Kids programming block.

In honour of Mighty Morphin Power Rangers' broadcast premiere, Hasbro announced "National Power Rangers Day" to be celebrated annually on August 28, 2018.

=== Broadcast and production ===
==== 1993–2010 ====
Saban Entertainment produced and distributed Power Rangers from 1993 until the end of 2001, with Fox Kids broadcasting the series in the United States until the Fall of 2002. The Walt Disney Company acquired the franchise as part of a larger buyout of Fox Family Worldwide that took place in 2001. Fox Family Worldwide subsequently became ABC Family Worldwide Inc. This buyout also saw Saban Entertainment become BVS Entertainment in 2002, from News Corporation, Fox's parent company, and Haim Saban.

From September 2002, Power Rangers had aired on various Disney-owned networks, including the ABC Kids program block on ABC, the ABC Family and Toon Disney cable networks, and Jetix-branded outlets worldwide. Disney moved production of the franchise from Los Angeles to Studio West in New Zealand after Wild Force ended. Several ABC affiliate broadcasting groups, including Hearst Television, declined to air the series due to the lack of FCC-compliant educational and informational content.

2008's Power Rangers Jungle Fury was originally set to be the final season, but due to obligations with Bandai, Disney would produce 2009's Power Rangers RPM. An article in The New Zealand Herald published on March 7, 2009, identified RPM as the last season of the Power Rangers run. Production manager Sally Campbell stated in an interview, "...at this stage we will not be shooting another season." A September 1, 2009, revision to Disney A to Z: The Official Encyclopedia by Disney's head archivist Dave Smith states that "production of new episodes [of Power Rangers] ceased in 2009". Production of Power Rangers ceased and the last series by BVS Entertainment, RPM, ended on December 26, 2009.

On October 1, 2009, Bandai released a press release stating that Disney would re-broadcast Mighty Morphin Power Rangers in January 2010 on ABC Kids in lieu of producing a new season. A new toy line accompanied the broadcast and appeared in stores in the later part of 2009.

==== 2011–2021 ====
On May 12, 2010, Haim Saban bought back the Power Rangers franchise from Disney for $43 million and announced plans to produce a new season of the television series. Beginning with the eighteenth season, Samurai (using footage from the 2009 Super Sentai series, Samurai Sentai Shinkenger) the series would be produced under Saban Capital Group's new Saban Brands subsidiary and premiere on Nickelodeon on February 7, 2011. Reruns of previous seasons and episodes would also begin airing on sister channel Nicktoons later that year. In addition to Samurai, Saban announced plans to make a new Power Rangers film.

On July 2, 2012, Saban Brands announced that would it launch a new Saturday morning cartoon block on The CW, called Vortexx, on August 25, 2012, with reruns of Power Rangers Lost Galaxy to air on the block.

On October 1, 2013, Saban Brands announced that it had extended agreements for the franchise with Nickelodeon and Bandai America Incorporated through 2016. In January 2016, Saban and Nickelodeon extended their broadcast partnership through 2018. In February 2018, it was announced that Power Rangers would continue airing on Nickelodeon through 2021. That same month, Saban Brands appointed Hasbro as the global master toy licensee for Power Rangers in April 2019 with a future option to purchase the franchise. On May 1, 2018, Saban would agree to sell Power Rangers and other entertainment assets to Hasbro for US$522 million in cash and stock. The Saban Brands subsidiary ended operations upon the closure of the deal on July 2, 2018.

The twenty-sixth and twenty-seventh seasons, Power Rangers Beast Morphers, would be produced by Hasbro's Allspark studio. Beginning with the twenty-eighth season, Power Rangers Dino Fury, the series is being produced by Entertainment One (which was acquired by Hasbro on December 30, 2019, and merged with Allspark in October 2020).

==== 2021–2023 ====
In late April 2021, actor Chance Perez announced in an interview that the second season of Power Rangers Dino Fury (the twenty-ninth season overall) would premiere on Netflix in 2022; making it the first season of the series to premiere exclusively online through a streaming service. Meanwhile, new episodes of the series moved to the streaming service on June 15, 2021.

On June 14, 2022, it was announced that Jenny Klein would serve as showrunner for a Power Rangers television series that is being developed by Entertainment One for Netflix. It was reported that she will work alongside Jonathan Entwistle, who is set to direct a second attempt at a film reboot (unrelated to the 2017 film reboot). Entwistle stated on his now-deleted Twitter page that the series he and Klein are developing was set to be part of the same canon as the upcoming Power Rangers film, which he described as a "cinematic universe". In June 2024, it was reported that none of those plans would move forward at Netflix; Hasbro Entertainment stated they were seeking a new partner to take the series in a new creative direction. No timeline was immediately announced.

On June 28, 2023, Hasbro announced that Power Rangers Cosmic Fury would be the final season to be filmed in New Zealand.

==== 2024–present ====
In December 2024, rumors surfaced that a new Power Rangers reboot film was being developed by Paramount Pictures in partnership with Hasbro.

In March 2025, it was announced that Hasbro Entertainment and 20th Television would be producing a new live-action Power Rangers series for Disney+ with Jonathan E. Steinberg & Dan Shotz in talks to serve as writers, showrunners, and executive producers. Steinberg and Shotz publicly confirmed they would be developing the series in December of 2025. The following month, Toei Company president and CEO Fumio Yoshimura revealed that the company was not involved in the live-action Power Rangers reboot. In August 2026, it was revealed that Disney had shelved the planned series for financial reasons, with sources telling Deadline the studio balked at spending to produce a show for a property it would not own.

== Television series ==
Series	Season	Episodes	Originally released			Showrunner(s)
Series	Season	Episodes	First released	Last released	Network	Showrunner(s)
Mighty Morphin Power Rangers	1	60	August 28, 1993	May 23, 1994	Fox (Fox Kids)	Ann Austen & Douglas Sloan
Mighty Morphin Power Rangers	2	52	July 21, 1994	May 20, 1995	Fox (Fox Kids)	Ann Austen & Douglas Sloan
Mighty Morphin Power Rangers	3	33	September 2, 1995	November 27, 1995	Fox (Fox Kids)	Ann Austen & Douglas Sloan
Mighty Morphin Alien Rangers	MS	10	February 5, 1996	February 17, 1996	Fox (Fox Kids)	Ann Austen & Douglas Sloan
Zeo	1	50	April 20, 1996	November 27, 1996	Fox (Fox Kids)	Ann Austen & Douglas Sloan
Turbo	1	45	April 19, 1997	November 24, 1997	Fox (Fox Kids)	Ann Austen & Douglas Sloan and Judd Lynn
In Space	1	43	February 6, 1998	November 21, 1998	Fox (Fox Kids)	Judd Lynn
Lost Galaxy	1	45	February 6, 1999	December 18, 1999	Fox (Fox Kids)	Judd Lynn
Lightspeed Rescue	1	40	February 12, 2000	November 18, 2000	Fox (Fox Kids)	Judd Lynn
Time Force	1	40	February 3, 2001	November 17, 2001	Fox (Fox Kids)	Judd Lynn
Wild Force	1	40	February 9, 2002	November 16, 2002	Fox (Fox Kids) / ABC (ABC Kids)	Jonathan Tzachor
Ninja Storm	1	38	February 15, 2003	November 15, 2003	ABC (ABC Kids)	Ann Austen & Douglas Sloan
Dino Thunder	1	38	February 14, 2004	November 20, 2004	ABC Family (Jetix)	Ann Austen & Douglas Sloan
S.P.D.	1	38	February 5, 2005	November 14, 2005 (Note: Episode 35 was aired later, on February 2, 2006)	ABC Family (Jetix) / Toon Disney (Jetix)	Bruce Kalish
Mystic Force	1	32	February 20, 2006	November 13, 2006	ABC Family (Jetix) / Toon Disney (Jetix)	Bruce Kalish
Operation Overdrive	1	32	February 26, 2007	November 12, 2007	Toon Disney (Jetix)	Bruce Kalish
Jungle Fury	1	32	February 18, 2008	November 3, 2008	Toon Disney (Jetix)	Bruce Kalish
RPM	1	32	March 7, 2009	December 26, 2009	ABC (ABC Kids)	Eddie Guzelian and Judd Lynn
Mighty Morphin Power Rangers (re-version)	RV	32	January 2, 2010	August 28, 2010	ABC (ABC Kids)	Haim Saban & Shuki Levy
Samurai / Super Samurai	1	23	February 7, 2011	December 10, 2011	Nickelodeon	Jonathan Tzachor
Samurai / Super Samurai	2	22	February 18, 2012	December 15, 2012	Nickelodeon	Jonathan Tzachor
Megaforce / Super Megaforce	1	22	February 2, 2013	December 7, 2013	Nickelodeon	Jonathan Tzachor
Megaforce / Super Megaforce	2	20	February 15, 2014	November 22, 2014	Nickelodeon	Jonathan Tzachor
Dino Charge / Dino Super Charge	1	22	February 7, 2015	December 12, 2015	Nickelodeon	Judd Lynn
Dino Charge / Dino Super Charge	2	22	January 30, 2016	December 10, 2016	Nickelodeon	Judd Lynn
Ninja Steel / Super Ninja Steel	1	22	January 21, 2017	December 2, 2017	Nickelodeon	Judd Lynn
Ninja Steel / Super Ninja Steel	2	22	January 27, 2018	December 1, 2018	Nickelodeon	Judd Lynn
Beast Morphers	1	22	March 2, 2019	December 14, 2019	Nickelodeon	Judd Lynn
Beast Morphers	2	22	February 22, 2020	December 12, 2020	Nickelodeon	Judd Lynn
Dino Fury	1	22	February 20, 2021	October 15, 2021 (Note: Complete season ended on December 18, 2021 on Nickelodeon.)	Nickelodeon / Netflix	Simon Bennett
Dino Fury	2	22	March 3, 2022	September 29, 2022	Netflix	Simon Bennett
Cosmic Fury	1	10	September 29, 2023		Netflix	Simon Bennett

The first six seasons (beginning with Mighty Morphin Power Rangers and ending with In Space) followed an overarching, evolving storyline. The second season began the annual tradition of the Rangers acquiring new Zords to battle enemies while the core suits from the first season were used, except for that of the White Ranger. With the fourth season, Zeo, Power Rangers began following the Super Sentai series' practice of annual Ranger suit changes.

Although the seventh season, Lost Galaxy, had ties with the preceding season, it was otherwise the first season to follow a self-contained story, as would later seasons of the show up until the seventeenth, RPM. The season also began the tradition of team-up episodes featuring Rangers, villains, and other characters from past seasons. Beginning with the eighteenth season, Samurai, the show returned to a multi-season format similar to Mighty Morphin Power Rangers, with self-contained storylines told across two seasons each. The thirtieth season, Cosmic Fury, is a continuation of Dino Fury's story.

According to executive producer Simon Bennett, Cosmic Fury was planned to be the final season set within the canon established since Mighty Morphin Power Rangers, with Hasbro instead opting for a franchise reboot; this reboot was originally set to be produced in partnership with Netflix; however, in 2024, Hasbro and Netflix ended their partnership, with the former opting to search for a new creative partner. In December 2024, rumors surfaced that Paramount would be partnering with Hasbro to produce future Power Rangers content. In March 2025, it was announced that Hasbro Entertainment and 20th Television would be producing a new live-action Power Rangers series for Disney+ with Jonathan E. Steinberg & Dan Shotz in talks to serve as writers, showrunners, and executive producers. In early December of 2025, Steinberg and Shotz publicly confirmed that they were developing the new live-action Power Rangers series.

== Feature films ==
Power Rangers has been adapted into three theatrical motion pictures. The first two are distributed by 20th Century Fox, while the third film was released in 2017 by Lionsgate.

In May 2014, Saban Brands and Lionsgate announced that they were planning to produce a new Power Rangers feature film. The film, titled simply Power Rangers, was released on March 24, 2017, to mixed reviews and a low performance at the box office. A fourth Power Rangers film was announced to be developed by Entertainment One and Netflix. On July 11, 2019, during a Reddit AMA, Dacre Montgomery revealed that the studio had plans to produce a second reboot, without him and the rest of the cast and the director returning. On December 13, 2019, it was reported that Jonathan Entwistle is in early talks to direct the reboot, with Patrick Burleigh being set to write the screenplay. The plot will reportedly involve time travel and will be set in the 1990s. These plans were scuttled in 2024, although, in December of the same year, reports surfaced that a new reboot film was being developed by Paramount Pictures in conjunction with Hasbro.

On April 19, 2023, a special film titled Mighty Morphin Power Rangers: Once & Always was released. It serves to commemorate the 30th anniversary of both Mighty Morphin Power Rangers and the Power Rangers franchise.

Film	Release date	Box office revenue			Director	Company	
Film	Release date	United States	Foreign	Total	Director	Production	Distributor
TV series franchise
Mighty Morphin Power Rangers: The Movie	June 30, 1995	$38,187,431	$28,245,763	$66,433,194	Bryan Spicer	Saban Entertainment; Toei Company; Fox Family Films	20th Century Fox
Turbo: A Power Rangers Movie	March 28, 1997	$8,363,899	$1,251,941	$9,615,840	David Winning and Shuki Levy	Saban Entertainment; Toei Company; Fox Family Films	20th Century Fox
Mighty Morphin Power Rangers: Once & Always	April 19, 2023	N/A	N/A	N/A	Charlie Haskell	Hasbro; Entertainment One	Netflix
Reboot
Power Rangers	March 24, 2017	$85,364,450	$57,167,102	$142,531,552	Dean Israelite	Lionsgate; SCG Films; Temple Hill Entertainment	Lionsgate (USA); Toei (Japan)
Total	1995–2017	$131,915,780	$86,664,806	$218,580,586			

== Recurring cast and characters ==
List indicators

This section includes characters who will appear or have appeared in multiple media within the franchise.

- An empty grey cell indicates the character was not in the media, or that the character's official presence has not yet been confirmed.
- ^{V} indicates a voice-only role.
- ^{Y} indicates a younger version of the character.

Character	Television series	Feature films	Television special
Character	1993–2023	1995, 1997, 2017	2023
Adam Park Black Ranger / Green Zeo Ranger / Green Turbo Ranger	Johnny Yong Bosch Matthew Sakimoto^{Y}	Johnny Yong Bosch	Johnny Yong Bosch
Aisha Campbell Yellow Ranger	Karan Ashley Sicily Sewell^{Y}	Karan Ashley	Karan Ashley
Alpha 5	Romy J. Sharf Sandi Sellner Donene Kistler Richard Steven Horvitz^{V}	Peta-Marie Rixon Donene Kistler Richard Steven Horvitz^{V} Bill Hader^{V}	
Billy Cranston Blue Ranger	David Yost Justin Timsit^{Y}	David Yost RJ Cyler	David Yost
Bulk	Paul Schrier Cody Slaton^{Y}	Paul Schrier	
Divatox	Carol Hoyt Hilary Shepard	Hilary Shepard	
Jason Lee Scott Red Ranger / Gold Ranger	Austin St. John	Austin St. John Dacre Montgomery	
Justin Stewart Blue Turbo Ranger	Blake Foster	Blake Foster	
Katherine Hillard Pink Ranger / Pink Zeo Ranger / Pink Turbo Ranger	Catherine Sutherland Julia Jordan^{Y}	Catherine Sutherland	Catherine Sutherland
Kimberly Hart Pink Ranger	Amy Jo Johnson	Amy Jo Johnson Naomi Scott	
Lord Zedd	Ed Neil Robert Axelrod^{V} Andrew Laing^{V} Fred Tatasciore^{V}	Mark Ginther Ed Neil Robert Axelrod^{V}	
Rita Repulsa	Machiko Soga Carla Perez Barbara Goodson^{V} Susan Brady^{V} (Note: Only in one episode of Power Rangers Mystic Force and one episode of Power Rangers Cosmic Fury)	Julia Cortez Carla Perez Barbara Goodson^{V} Elizabeth Banks	Barbara Goodson^{V}
Rocky DeSantos Red Ranger / Blue Zeo Ranger	Steve Cardenas Michael J. O'Laskey^{Y}	Steve Cardenas	Steve Cardenas
Skull	Jason Narvy Ross J. Samya^{Y}	Jason Narvy	
Tanya Sloan Yellow Zeo Ranger / Yellow Turbo Ranger	Nakia Burrise Khanya Mkhize^{Y}	Nakia Burrise	
Tommy Oliver Green Ranger / White Ranger / Red Zeo Ranger / Red Turbo Ranger / Black Dino Ranger	Jason David Frank (Note: Also voiced by Jeffrey Parazzo in one episode of Power Rangers S.P.D.) Michael R. Gotto^{Y}	Jason David Frank	
Trini Kwan Yellow Ranger	Thuy Trang	Becky G	
Zack Taylor Black Ranger	Walter Emanuel Jones	Walter Emanuel Jones Ludi Lin	Walter Emanuel Jones
Zordon	David J. Fielding Robert L. Manahan^{V}	Nicholas Bell Winston Richard Robert L. Manahan^{V} Bryan Cranston	

== Distribution ==
Power Rangers has long had success in international markets and continues to air in many countries. As of 2006, Power Rangers aired at least 65 times a week in more than 40 worldwide markets. Many markets carry or have carried the series on their respective Fox or later Jetix/Disney XD channels or have syndicated the program on regional children's channels or blocks, either dubbed into the local language or broadcast in the original English. After the 2010 acquisition by Saban Brands, international television distribution rights for Power Rangers have been managed by MarVista Entertainment until 2014. Saban took over international distribution until Hasbro's acquisition.

Broadcast in East Asian territories has been treated differently from in other international markets due to the prevalence and familiarity of 'the Super Sentai brand originating in Japan. Power Rangers was briefly banned in Malaysia for supposedly encouraging the use of drugs because it contained the word "Morphin'" in its title, which could be associated with morphine. The show eventually aired without the offending word. In Japan, many Power Rangers television seasons and films were dubbed into Japanese for television and video with the voice actors often pulled from past Super Sentai casts, leading to the English-dubbed action sequences being "re-dubbed" or "restored" back to Japanese as well. Power Rangers Mystic Force is the latest season to be broadcast in Japan on Toei Channel in January 2014, with another cast voicing the American counterparts. After broadcast of Power Rangers ended in South Korea with Wild Force, Bandai of Korea started airing dubbed Super Sentai series under the 파워레인저 (Power Ranger) brand on JEI TV. Some seasons of Super Sentai broadcast in South Korea have similarly named titles as their American counterparts, such as Power Ranger Dino Thunder for Abaranger in 2007 and Power Ranger S.P.D. in place of Dekaranger.

=== Home media and streaming ===
On VHS, 3 million Power Rangers video cassettes had been sold in the United States by early 1994.

As of October 2009, 33 Power Rangers DVD collections have been released in the United States:

- Mighty Morphin Power Rangers: The Movie, 1995; 20th Century Fox Home Entertainment
- Turbo: A Power Rangers Movie, 1997; 20th Century Fox Home Entertainment
- Mighty Morphin Power Rangers: The Movie/Turbo: A Power Rangers Movie, 1995, 1997; 20th Century Fox Home Entertainment (DVD compilation set of both films.)
- The Best of the Power Rangers: The Ultimate Rangers, 2003; Buena Vista Home Entertainment (DVD compilation of episodes from five different seasons of Power Rangers. The episodes include "Forever Red" and "White Light" [Tommy's reintroduction as the White Power Ranger]).
- Power Rangers Ninja Storm Volumes 1–5, 2003; Buena Vista Home Entertainment
- Power Rangers Dino Thunder Volumes 1–5, 2004; Buena Vista Home Entertainment
- Power Rangers S.P.D. Volumes 1–5, 2005; Buena Vista Home Entertainment
- Power Rangers Mystic Force Volumes 1–3 and 'Dark Wish', 2006; Buena Vista Home Entertainment
- Power Rangers Operation Overdrive Volumes 1–5, 2007; Buena Vista Home Entertainment (The release of an entire season for the first time in the US.)
- Power Rangers Jungle Fury Volumes 1 & 2, 2008; Walt Disney Studios Home Entertainment (Volumes 3–5 are only available in the UK.)
- Power Rangers RPM Volumes 1 & 2, 2009; Walt Disney Studios Home Entertainment
- Power Rangers RPM 'Bandai Demo DVD', 2009; Walt Disney Studios Home Entertainment (A promo DVD given away at Disney Stores. Contains the episode In or Out).
- Mighty Morphin Power Rangers Season 1 Volumes 1–2, 2012; Shout Factory
- Mighty Morphin Power Rangers The Complete Series, 2012; Shout Factory
- Mighty Morphin Power Rangers Season 2 Volumes 1–2, 2013; Shout Factory
- Mighty Morphin Power Rangers Season 3, 2013; Shout Factory
- Power Rangers Seasons 4–7, 2013; Shout Factory
- Power Rangers Seasons 8–12, 2013; Shout Factory
- Power Rangers: Legacy, 2013; Shout Factory. Contains the first 20 seasons and spare disc slots for the Mighty Morphin Power Rangers: The Movie and Turbo: A Power Rangers Movie DVDs
- Power Rangers Seasons 14–17, 2014; Shout Factory
- Mighty Morphin Alien Rangers, 2013; Shout Factory
- Power Rangers Zeo Volumes 1–2, 2013–2014; Shout Factory
- Power Rangers Turbo Volumes 1–2, 2014; Shout Factory
- Power Rangers in Space Volumes 1–2, 2013–2014; Shout Factory
- Mighty Morphin Power Rangers Green with Evil, 2014; Shout Factory
- Power Rangers Lost Galaxy The Complete Series, 2015; Shout Factory
- Power Rangers Lightspeed Rescue The Complete Series, 2015; Shout Factory
- Power Rangers Time Force The Complete Series, 2016; Shout Factory
- Power Rangers Wild Force The Complete Series, 2016; Shout Factory
- Power Rangers Ninja Storm The Complete Series, 2016; Shout Factory
- Power Rangers Dino Thunder The Complete Series, 2016; Shout Factory
- Power Rangers SPD The Complete Series, 2017; Shout Factory
- Power Rangers Mystic Force The Complete Series, 2017; Shout Factory
- Power Rangers Operation Overdrive The Complete Series, 2017; Shout Factory
- Power Rangers Jungle Fury The Complete Series, 2017; Shout Factory
- Power Rangers RPM The Complete Series, 2018; Shout Factory
- Power Rangers Samurai Volumes 1–5, 2012–2013; Lionsgate Home Entertainment
- Power Rangers Samurai "Monster Bash" and 2 MMPR Halloween episodes; Lionsgate Home Entertainment
- Power Rangers Samurai "Christmas Together, Samurai Forever" and 2 MMPR Christmas episodes; Lionsgate Home Entertainment
- Power Rangers Super Samurai Volumes 1–4 plus The Complete Series; Lionsgate Home Entertainment
- Power Rangers Megaforce Volumes 1–5, 2013–2014; Lionsgate Home Entertainment
- Power Rangers Super Megaforce Volumes 1–5. 2014–2015; Lionsgate Home Entertainment
- Power Rangers Dino Charge Volumes 1–2, 2016; Lionsgate Home Entertainment
- Power Rangers Dino Charge The Complete Season, 2017; Lionsgate Home Entertainment
- Power Rangers, 2017; Lionsgate Home Entertainment
- Power Rangers Dino Super Charge The Complete Season, 2017; Lionsgate Home Entertainment
- Power Rangers Ninja Steel The Complete Season, 2018; Lionsgate Home Entertainment
- Power Rangers Super Ninja Steel The Complete Season, 2019; Lionsgate Home Entertainment

On March 12, 2012, Shout! Factory announced a home video distribution deal with Saban, which includes the first 17 series of Power Rangers. Shout! Factory released the first seven seasons on DVD in August 2012, seasons 8–12 in November 2013, a 20-year collection in December 2013, and seasons 13–17 in April 2014.

On March 22, 2012 Lionsgate Home Entertainment reached a home media distribution deal with Saban to release Power Rangers Samurai to DVD and Blu-ray.

Internationally, additional DVD releases have occurred (such as Lightspeed Rescue, Time Force and Wild Force in Germany) and as free DVDs attached to the Jetix magazine, published in the UK. Mighty Morphin Power Rangers Season 1, Season 2, and Season 3, Power Rangers Zeo, Power Rangers Turbo, and Power Rangers in Space have been released in Germany as well in both English and German, with Power Rangers Lost Galaxy only in German. Additionally, Ninja Storm, Dino Thunder, S.P.D., Mystic Force, and Operation Overdrive saw complete boxset releases in the UK. In France, Mighty Morphin Season 1 and Season 2 have been released in their entirety in 5 episode DVD volumes, and the first 25 episodes of Season 3 were released in May 2008. In Italy, Mighty Morphin, Zeo, Dino Thunder and S.P.D. have appeared in their entirety. Zeo and S.P.D. were made available as commercial DVDs, while Mighty Morphin and Dino Thunder were issued as bi-weekly volumes at newsstands.

The iTunes Store previously made Power Rangers episodes available: part of Mighty Morphin Power Rangers, all of Power Rangers S.P.D., and the first 26 episodes of Power Rangers Mystic Force. Subsequent seasons and episodes of the program also made their appearances in the iTunes Store, but as of July 2009, Turbo: A Power Rangers Movie is the only Power Rangers film available. In 2012, Mighty Morphin Power Rangers Season 1 volumes 1 & 2 were released on iTunes to coincide with the DVD releases. As of February 2013, all 3 seasons of MMPR were released on iTunes.

On June 15, 2011, all episodes of Power Rangers from Mighty Morphin Power Rangers Season 1 to Mighty Morphin Power Rangers re-version were made available for instant streaming on Netflix. In 2015, Power Rangers became available on the iTunes Store.

In 2021, more than twenty seasons of Power Rangers, including specials and spin-off shows, were removed from Netflix, while Mighty Morphin Power Rangers, Power Rangers Ninja Steel and Power Rangers Beast Morphers remained in the platform's catalog.

As of 2025, most seasons of the television show are currently available on Pluto TV, Roku Channel, Plex and Hasbro's official Power Rangers channel on YouTube.

== Toys ==
On February 15, 2018, Saban Brands announced that their 25-year partnership with Bandai would end in 2019. The next day, it was confirmed that Hasbro would be the new "global master toy licensee" for the franchise starting in April 2019, with a future option for Hasbro to buy the entire franchise. Hasbro paid $22.25 million upon the toy contract's closure. When they acquired the franchise as a whole later that year, that amount was credited against the purchase price paid to Saban for the series and related assets.

In 2019, Hasbro launched Power Rangers Lightning Collection, a collector line of articulated action figures and other collectibles inspired by characters from the television series, the BOOM! Studios comic books and other media, as well as two toy lines for kids, one designed to promote the Power Rangers Beast Morphers series, and another one focused on preschoolers.

Hasbro has also sublicensed the brand to other companies, such as Threezero and Super7, to produce high-end collectibles.

In 2024, Playmates Toys signed an agreement with Hasbro to produce toys based on the Power Rangers brand, starting with a kid-targeted Mighty Morphin Power Rangers product line, scheduled to release in 2025. During an earnings call, Hasbro's CEO Chris Cocks explained that the brand was chosen to be outsourced to Playmates due to low profitability.

== Comics ==
Power Rangers has had several series of comics over the years.

- Mighty Morphin Power Rangers, Hamilton Comics, 1994–1995.
- Mighty Morphin Power Rangers, Marvel Comics, 1995–1996.
- Power Rangers Zeo, Image Comics, 1996.
- Power Rangers Turbo, Saban Powerhouse, 1997.
- Power Rangers Ninja Storm, Disney Adventures, 2003.
- Power Rangers Ninja Storm, Tokyopop, 2003–2004.
- Power Rangers Ninja Storm, Jetix, 2003.
- Power Rangers Dino Thunder, Tokyopop, 2004.
- Power Rangers Dino Thunder, Jetix Magazine, 2004.
- Power Rangers S.P.D., Jetix Magazine, 2005.
- Power Rangers Operation Overdrive, Jetix Magazine, 2007.
- Power Rangers Super Samurai, Papercutz, 2012.
- Power Rangers Megaforce, Papercutz, 2013.
- Mighty Morphin Power Rangers, Papercutz, 2014.

In 2015, Boom! Studios won the Power Rangers comics license, which brought a lot of award-winning publications.

- Mighty Morphin Power Rangers, BOOM! Studios, 2016–2020, 2022–2024.
- Mighty Morphin Power Rangers: Pink, BOOM! Studios, 2016–2017.
- Mighty Morphin Power Rangers: Annuals, BOOM! Studios, 2016–present.
- Power Rangers: Aftershock, BOOM! Studios, 2017.
- Go Go Power Rangers, BOOM! Studios, 2017–2020.
- Justice League/Mighty Morphin Power Rangers, BOOM! Studios/DC Comics, 2017.
- Mighty Morphin Power Rangers vs Teenage Mutant Ninja Turtles, BOOM! Studios/IDW, 2019–2020.
- Ranger Slayer, Boom Studios, 2020.
- Power Rangers: Drakkon New Dawn, Boom Studios, 2020.
- Mighty Morphin, Boom Studios, 2020–2022.
- Power Rangers, Boom Studios, 2020–2022.
- Power Rangers Unlimited: Heir to Darkness , Boom Studios, 2021.
- Power Rangers Unlimited: Edge of Darkness , Boom Studios, 2021.
- Power Rangers Universe , Boom Studios, 2021–2022.
- Godzilla vs Mighty Morphin Power Rangers, IDW/BOOM! Studios, 2022.
- Power Rangers Unlimited: Countdown to Ruin , Boom Studios, 2022.
- Power Rangers Unlimited: Death Ranger , Boom Studios, 2022.
- Mighty Morphin Power Rangers vs Teenage Mutant Ninja Turtles II, BOOM! Studios/IDW, 2022–2023.
- Power Rangers Unlimited: The Coinless , Boom Studios, 2023.
- Power Rangers Unlimited: Hyperforce , Boom Studios, 2023.
- Mighty Morphin Power Rangers 30th Anniversary Special, BOOM! Studios, 2023.
- Ranger Academy, Boom Studios, 2023–2024.
- Power Rangers Unlimited: The Morphin Masters , Boom Studios, 2024.
- Mighty Morphin Power Rangers; The Return, BOOM! Studios, 2024
- Godzilla vs Mighty Morphin Power Rangers II, IDW/BOOM! Studios, 2024.
- Power Rangers Infinity , Boom Studios, 2024.
- Mighty Morphin Power Rangers/Usagi Yojimbo, BOOM! Studios/Dark Horse, 2024.
- Power Rangers Across the Morphin Grid, Boom Studios, 2024.
- Power Rangers Prime, Boom Studios, 2024-.
- Power Rangers/VR Troopers , Boom Studios, 2025.

== Books ==
In June 2018, Penguin Random House released Alien Encounters in Angel Grove, an encyclopedia of creatures from Mighty Morphin Power Rangers, written by Gabriel P. Cooper.

In November 2018, Insight Editions released Power Rangers: The Ultimate Visual History, detailing the various toys and television seasons over the franchise's 25-year run.

In May 2025, Force of Chaos, a young adult novel focused on Trini Kwan, from Mighty Morphin Power Rangers, was published by Amulet Books. It was written by Diana Ma. A second novel, titled Shatter the Universe, was released on May 19, 2026.

== Parodies ==
The franchise has been parodied by many sectors of popular media along the years.

- GTA V: The game features a fictitious animated show named "Kung Fu Rainbow Lazerforce" as a series in the in-game television program.
- "Sour Rangers", the parody series of the Power Rangers from Annoying Orange.
- British professional wrestling promotion All Star Wrestling featured multiple wrestlers performing under masks as the "Power Restlin' Rangers" on their shows in 1995.

== See also ==
- Big Bad Beetleborgs
- Kamen Rider: Dragon Knight
- List of Power Rangers cast members
- Masked Rider
- Mystic Knights of Tir Na Nog
- Ninja Turtles: The Next Mutation
- Super Sentai
- Superhuman Samurai Syber-Squad
- Tattooed Teenage Alien Fighters from Beverly Hills
- VR Troopers
- List of highest-grossing media franchises
