= Go Go Power Rangers =

1994 song performed by Ron Wasserman

Single by Ron Wasserman

from the album Mighty Morphin Power Rangers The Album: A Rock Adventure
- Released: US: December 2, 1994; UK: December 14, 1994
- Genre: Heavy metal; power metal
- Length: 4:43
- Label: Saban Records
- Songwriter: Ron Wasserman
- Producer: Ron Wasserman

"Go Go Power Rangers" is a song by Ron Wasserman who recorded it under the name Aaron Waters - The Mighty RAW. It was released by Saban Records, later renamed Saban Music Group of Saban Capital Group, on CD and cassette formats in the US on December 2, 1994, and in the UK December 14, 1994. The song serves as the opening theme for the first three seasons of the original Power Rangers series, Mighty Morphin Power Rangers. It was composed using keyboard only, preloaded with guitar and drum sound since Ron Wasserman does not play either instrument. The song, with minor alterations of its lyrics, was also used for the mini-series Alien Rangers. The titular refrain, "Go Go Power Rangers!", has become a popular catchphrase associated with the show, and it has been used in several other themes for the series.

A cover of the song, performed by Noam Kaniel, was used as the show's intro theme from 2011 up to 2014, starting with the 18th season of the franchise, Power Rangers Samurai. A rearrangement of Kaniel's version was used for 2013's Power Rangers Megaforce, revising some lyrics to reflect that season. The lyrics "Go Go Power Rangers" were incorporated into otherwise-new theme songs for Power Rangers Dino Charge, Power Rangers Ninja Steel, Power Rangers Beast Morphers, and Power Rangers Dino Fury.

== Musical style ==
In a 2023 interview, Ron Wasserman talked about the sound of this song and others he made for the series, saying "It's not exactly heavy metal. People have called it that, it's really not. It's more like speed metal, sort of, but it's not quite as heavy, and I think that's because of the vocals, really. Normally you'd have groups like that, and you have somebody with the [guttural noises], you'd have that deep, grungy chord voice. It's [also] not pop metal, it's its own thing. It's hard to describe." He added, "the closest I've heard to it is like when Metallica did Hardwired... to Self-Destruct, and I just went, 'Wow, they're hitting that speed, they're hitting those things.' I mean, I absolutely loved it because it's flying at such a fast pace."

== Track listing ==
Cassette

1. "Go Go Power Rangers (Euro Mix)"
2. "Go Go Power Rangers (Original LP Long Version)"

== 1995 film version ==
"Go Go Power Rangers"

Single by The Power Rangers Orchestra

from the album Mighty Morphin Power Rangers The Movie: Original Soundtrack Album
- Released: May 30, 1995
- Recorded: Rumbo Recorders, Canoga Park, Los Angeles
- Genre: Heavy metal, power metal
- Length: 5:03
- Songwriters: Ron Westerman; Ron Kenan

For the 1995 film adaptation Mighty Morphin Power Rangers: The Movie, a new arrangement of "Go Go Power Rangers" was recorded for the film's soundtrack. The song was performed by "The Power Rangers Orchestra": a collaboration that featured Mr. Big frontman Eric Martin, Guitarist Tim Pierce, former Pablo Cruise bass player John Pierce, singer-pianist Kim Bullard, and former Guns N' Roses drummer Matt Sorum.

== 2012 re-recording ==
In 2012, Wasserman re-recorded "Go Go Power Rangers", along with "the best known songs" from the first four seasons of Power Rangers, and released a digital album titled Power Rangers Redux to both his personal Bandcamp and iTunes. Of the album, Wasserman said, "The original recordings were done quickly to keep up with the production schedule...I wanted to use today's technology, and my additional 20+ years of experience as a producer, to 'punch up' the performances and energy to match today's sound."

== Notable cover versions ==
- A nu metal version of the song was released in 2003, as part of the album Best of the Power Rangers: Songs from the TV Series, by Buena Vista Records.
- Norwegian metal singer, Leo Moracchioli covered the song along with Truls Haugen, which recorded the rock version of Power Rangers Dino Charge and Dino Super Charge.
- Nekrogoblikon made an evil parody of the song, using goblin themed lyrics & titled The Goblin Rangers Theme
- Charlie Parra del Riego made a true metal version of the song.
- Underground death metal act Vile Inscription covered the song, using video clips of the videogame
- In 2019, a remix featuring DJ White Shadow was released by Hasbro.

== Newer versions ==
The song, when used as the main theme for Power Rangers Samurai and Power Rangers Super Samurai, was performed by Noam Kaniel. Different arrangements, with some of the lyrics altered for each, were used for the subsequent series, including Power Rangers Megaforce and Power Rangers Super Megaforce; Power Rangers Dino Charge and Power Rangers Dino Super Charge; and Power Rangers Ninja Steel, all of which were also performed by Kaniel.
