= Power Rangers (song) =

1994 single by Mighty Morph'n Power Rangers

Single by Mighty Morph'n Power Rangers
- B-side: "Go Green Ranger Go"
- Released: December 5, 1994
- Label: RCA
- Songwriter: Kussa Mahchi
- Producers: Matt Aitken; Mike Stock

"Power Rangers" is a song written by Kussa Mahchi and performed by the Mighty RAW, credited as "Mighty Morph'n Power Rangers" on the single release. The song was released on December 5, 1994, on CD, 7-inch vinyl, and tape cassette during the first season of Mighty Morphin Power Rangers and at the height of the series' popularity. The single was widely publicized in the United Kingdom, where it reached number three on the UK Singles Chart, and a corresponding video featuring footage from the series received considerable airtime on national television.

== Track information ==
Of these tracks, only the third "Go Green Ranger Go" was original music from the television series. The other three were remixed and rearranged songs, using the series' theme tune as well as sound clips from the series. The extended club mix was basically just the main theme tune, but extended to last about 2 minutes longer.

The main song was particularly notable for an original line of dialogue recorded by David Fielding (Zordon) and Richard Steven Horvitz (Alpha 5) for the end of the song. The two characters, Zordon particularly, reveal the future existence of the first White Ranger, before such a thing existed in the Power Rangers franchise.

== Production ==
Power Rangers music for the single was produced by Mike Stock and Matt Aitken. "Go Green Ranger Go" was produced, arranged and engineered by Ron Wasserman, recorded at Saban Studios and mastered by Ric Wilson. The music coordinator was David Hillenbrand. All four songs were performed by Ron Wasserman (A.K.A. Aaron Waters - The Mighty RAW).

== Track listings ==
UK 7-inch vinyl

A1. "Power Rangers"
B1. "Go Green Ranger Go"
B2. "Power Rangers" (instrumental mix)

UK CD and cassette single

1. "Power Rangers"
2. "Power Rangers" (extended club mix)
3. "Go Green Ranger Go"
4. "Power Rangers" (instrumental mix)

== Charts ==
=== Weekly charts ===
Chart (1994)	Peak position
Europe (Eurochart Hot 100)	13
Ireland (IRMA)	9
Scotland (OCC)	4
UK Singles (OCC)	3

=== Year-end charts ===
Chart (1994)	Position
UK Singles (OCC)	46

== Certifications ==
Region	Certification	Certified units/sales
United Kingdom (BPI)	Silver	200,000^{^}
^{^} Shipments figures based on certification alone.

== Release history ==
Region	Date	Format(s)	Label(s)	Ref(s).
United Kingdom	December 5, 1994	7-inch vinyl; CD; cassette	RCA	
Australia	February 13, 1995	CD; cassette	RCA	
