= Fisher (band) =

American band

- Origin: Los Angeles, California, United States
- Genres: Rock, pop
- Years active: 1997–2019
- Label: Rawfish
- Past members: Kathy Fisher; Ron Wasserman
- Website: http://www.fishertheband.com

Fisher was an American band consisting of songwriter Ron Wasserman and vocalist Kathy Fisher. The band was known for selling their songs through Internet marketing, and received a record deal from their success at MP3.com. Their song "I Will Love You" reached #36 on the Billboard Adult Top 40 chart in 2000.

== History ==
Fisher released their first album One independently in early 1999, featuring the single "I Will Love You". They were signed by Farmclub.com and Interscope Records and released their first album True North in 2000.

Fisher has enjoyed some mainstream success. "I Will Love You" (a tribute to Brent Mydland, the late keyboardist of the Grateful Dead) was featured in a 2001 episode of Dawson's Creek, a 2001 episode of Roswell, and in the 2007 film Death Sentence. It hit #36 on the Billboard Adult Top 40 chart in 2000. A 2005 Toyota commercial depicting a tire rolling through various indoor and outdoor backdrops featured their song "Beautiful Life". "Breakable" was featured in a 2002 episode of Smallville. "You", a track on The Lovely Years, was featured in a 2007 episode of Bones.

== Touring ==
Fisher toured with Oasis and Lisa Loeb before being signed to a major label. In 1998, they toured on the Lilith Fair. They were the only unsigned artist to appear on the tour that year.

== Discography ==
=== Studio albums ===
- One (1999)
- True North (2000)
- Uppers & Downers (2002)
- The Lovely Years (2005)
- Acoustic Cafe 2 (2008)
- Water (2009)
- stripped (2010)
- 3 (2014)

=== Singles ===
- "I Will Love You" (1997)
- "Any Way" (2005)
- "Never Ending" (2014)
- "On My Way V2" - THE NOTHING Video Game Soundtrack (2018)
