= Power Rangers Dino Charge =

22nd season of the Power Rangers franchise broadcast in 2015

- The logo for Power Rangers Dino Charge season 1
- Also known as: Power Rangers Dino Super Charge
- Genre: Action-adventure; Fantasy drama; Science fiction; Superhero
- Created by: Haim Saban; Toei Company
- Based on: Zyuden Sentai Kyoryuger by Toei Company
- Developed by: Saban Brands; Toei Company
- Showrunner: Judd "Chip" Lynn
- Starring: Brennan Mejia; Camille Hyde; Yoshi Sudarso; Michael Taber; James Davies; Claire Blackwelder; Davi Santos; Ryan Carter
- Narrated by: Stig Eldred (opening narration)
- Opening theme: "Go Go Power Rangers" performed by Cash Callaway
- Ending theme: Instrumental version of "Go Go Power Rangers"
- Composer: Noam Kaniel
- Countries of origin: United States; Japan
- Original language: English
- No. of seasons: 2
- No. of episodes: 44

Production
- Executive producers: Haim Saban; Judd "Chip" Lynn; Brian Casentini
- Producers: Sally Campbell; Joel Andryc; Jeffery Newman; Elie Dekel (Dino Charge)
- Production locations: New Zealand (Auckland Region) (Auckland); Japan (Greater Tokyo Area) (Tokyo, Saitama, Yokohama) and Kyoto)
- Cinematography: DJ Stipsen; Kevin Riley; Sean McLin (2nd unit)
- Camera setup: Single-camera
- Running time: 23 minutes
- Production companies: Saban Brands; Toei Company; Power Rangers Productions

Original release
- Network: Nickelodeon
- Release: February 7, 2015 – December 10, 2016

Related
- Power Rangers television series

First season poster

Second season logo

Second season poster

Power Rangers Dino Charge is a television series and the nineteenth entry of the Power Rangers franchise. Using footage, costumes and props from Japanese 37th Super Sentai Series Zyuden Sentai Kyoryuger, it is the first season to be distributed by Saban Brands Entertainment Group, after the formation of two new units within the company called Saban Brands Lifestyle Group and Saban Brands Entertainment Group on December 11, 2014. The show is produced by SCG Power Rangers and began airing on Nickelodeon on February 7, 2015, ending on December 12, 2015.

The second season and twenty-third overall, Power Rangers Dino Super Charge, premiered on January 30, 2016, and ended on December 10, 2016.

== Plot summary ==
=== Season 1: Dino Charge ===
Sixty-five million years ago, a dinosauroid alien named Keeper was pursued through the galaxy by Sledge, an intergalactic bounty hunter bent on acquiring ten magical stones called the Energems in Keeper's care and using them to conquer the universe. Keeper crash landed on prehistoric Earth, entrusting the gems to many dinosaurs for safe-keeping and crippled Sledge's ship with a bomb that left the bounty hunter stranded in deep space. Unfortunately, Sledge's collection of asteroids held in a tractor beam accidentally rained down on prehistoric Earth and ultimately caused the extinction of the dinosaurs.

In the present day, Keeper is found by paleontologist Kendall Morgan and they set up a base under the Amber Beach Dinosaur Museum in the city of Amber Beach. They begin a mission to find the Energems, but five have already been found by teenagers, who use them to morph into the Dino Charge Power Rangers. The group consists of the Red Ranger, Tyler Navarro, an adventurous teen who is searching for his father who disappeared ten years ago on a geological dig; the Pink Ranger, Shelby Watkins, a waitress with a vast knowledge of dinosaurs; the Blue Ranger, Koda, a 100,000-year old caveman living in modern times as he found his Energem in his tribe's cave, and was kept in suspended animation until the present day; the Green Ranger, Riley Griffin, the youngest of the group who is a skilled swordsman; and the Black Ranger, Chase Randall, a suave and laid-back New Zealand skater. With these powers, the Rangers fight against Sledge, Poisandra, Fury, Wrench, Curio, and their prison full of monsters in order to find the remaining Energems and protect Earth.

As time goes by, the Rangers are joined by additional teammates with additional Dino Zords: the Gold Ranger, Sir Ivan, an 800-year-old knight from Zandar who was trapped in the body of Sledge's minion Fury and the Graphite Ranger Prince Phillip III of Zandar, the modern day crown prince of Ivan's home country. An elderly man from New Zealand, Albert Smith, briefly becomes the Purple Ranger before abandoning the position due to his fear of monsters – Kendall then takes over as the Purple Ranger. The Rangers seemingly defeat Sledge and his crew at the end of the series and disband, but the human-like villain Heckyl and his monstrous split personality Snide are shown to have survived.

=== Season 2: Dino Super Charge ===
After being forced to return to action following Heckyl and Snide's appearance, the Ranger team later gets two new members: the Aqua Ranger, who is revealed to be Tyler's missing father James, and the Silver Ranger, who is revealed to be Zenowing, an alien who was Keeper's apprentice in the past. Meanwhile, Singe, a mysterious warrior who arrives on Earth, quickly steps in as Heckyl's number two, much to Fury's anger. However, Heckyl soon grows suspicious of Singe's intentions, forcing Singe to flee. He later returns to Earth with the person who hired him, named Lord Arcanon, who possesses a previously unknown eleventh Energem known as the Dark Energem. Arcanon overthrows Heckyl and briefly serves as the monsters' leader. During this period, Heckyl and Snide are split from each other after Heckyl discovers that Arcanon destroyed his home planet millions of years ago and erased his memories. Arcanon is soon defeated by Sledge, who is revealed to have survived the end of season one.

As the result of Heckyl's memories being restored, he gradually redeems himself and eventually decides to team up with the Rangers to defeat Sledge and his allies. The Rangers destroy the Dark Energem, which inadvertently creates a black hole which consumes the Earth. The Rangers' ten Energems are revealed to be capable of time travel when brought together, leading Keeper to send them back to the day he crashed on Earth sixty-five million years ago. The Rangers and Heckyl successfully defeat Sledge and his monsters in the past.

After their enemies' destruction, the Rangers go their separate ways. The Energems' time travel ability allows Koda and Ivan to return to their own time periods, meanwhile Heckyl allies with Zenowing to prevent Arcanon's destruction of Heckyl's home planet. Once the remaining Rangers arrive back in the present day, they find that the dinosaur museum has become a dinosaur zoo, with the Rangers realizing that because Sledge was defeated before his asteroids ever hit Earth, they have returned to a timeline where the extinction of the dinosaurs never took place.

== Cast and characters ==
Dino Charge Rangers

- Brennan Mejia as Tyler Navarro, the Dino Charge Red Ranger
- James Davies as Chase Randall, the Dino Charge Black Ranger
- Yoshi Sudarso as Koda, the Dino Charge Blue Ranger
- Michael Taber as Riley Griffin, the Dino Charge Green Ranger
- Camille Hyde as Shelby Watkins, the Dino Charge Pink Ranger
- Davi Santos as Sir Ivan of Zandar, the Dino Charge Gold Ranger
- Reuben Turner (portrayal) and Daniel Musgrove (voice) as James Navarro, the Dino Charge Aqua Ranger
- Jarred Blakiston as Prince Phillip III, the Dino Charge Graphite Ranger
- Arthur Ranford as Albert Smith, the first Dino Charge Purple Ranger
- Claire Blackwelder as Kendall Morgan, the second Dino Charge Purple Ranger
- Alistair Browning as the voice of Zenowing, the Dino Charge Silver Ranger

Supporting characters

- Eve Gordon as Keeper (in-suit performer)
  - Richard Simpson as Keeper (voice)
- Patricia Vichman as Moana
- Alexander Walker as Matt Griffin
- Mila Simons as Chloe Randall
- Elizabeth Dowden as Kaylee
- James Gaylyn as Mr. Watkins
- Campbell Cooley as Mecha Voice

Villains

- Adam Gardiner as the voice of Sledge, the main antagonist of the series
- Campbell Cooley as the voice of Snide
- Ryan Carter as Heckyl
- Paul Harrop as the voice of Fury
- Estevez Gillespie as the voices of Wrench and Curio
- Jackie Clarke as the voice of Poisandra
- Andy Grainger as the voice of Lord Arcanon
- Mark Mitchinson as the voice of Singe
- Mark Wright as the voice of Doomwing/Evil Dino Charge Silver Ranger

== Episodes ==
=== Season 1: Power Rangers Dino Charge (2015) ===
No. overall	No. in season	Title	Directed by	Written by	Original release date	U.S. viewers (millions)
1	1	"Powers from the Past"	Jonathan Brough	Chip Lynn	February 7, 2015	1.93
The Energems: the 10 most powerful crystals in existence, are passed by their protectorate Keeper to 10 dinosaurs for safety when intergalactic Bounty Hunter Sledge forces Keeper to crash on prehistoric Earth. A bomb planted by Keeper sends Sledge's ship into deep space whilst causing his collection of asteroids to rain down on Earth, causing global extinction of the dinosaurs. 65,000,000 years later, Adventurer Tyler Navarro, searching for traces of his father who disappeared years earlier, stumbles upon the Red Energem, only to be attacked by a hooded figure who he narrowly escapes. Meanwhile, waitress and dinosaur enthusiast Shelby Watkins smuggles her way onto a dig site and catches a thief in the act, only to discover it's the evil monster Ice Age, trying to escape with the Pink Energem. Through a chance encounter, Tyler and Shelby must protect their lives and unlock the secret power of the Energems.
2	2	"Past, Present and Fusion"	Jonathan Brough	Chip Lynn	February 14, 2015	1.38
Riley Griffin encounters Fury, a monster who has been on Earth since Keeper's bomb, and while battling him, discovers and bonds to the Green Energem. Leaving his family farm to find answers, he encounters Tyler and Shelby. They all soon discover they all possess Energems and travel to Amber Beach Dinosaur Museum, where Shelby works as a waitress. Finding a secret base under the museum, Kendall Morgan, Shelby's boss, reveals she knows about the Energems, Keeper, Shelby's co-workers, Chase Randall and Koda, possess the Black and Blue Energems. She begins to instruct them on fighting Sledge's forces as the Dino Charge Power Rangers. When Iceage reappears to get back the Energems, Tyler, Shelby, and Riley must quickly learn to master their new powers and responsibilities as the Dino Charge Power Rangers. Later, Chase and Koda confront Keeper about the new monster, who informs them that the evil responsible, Sledge, may be about to return.
3	3	"A Fool's Hour"	Charlie Haskell	Chip Lynn	February 21, 2015	1.53
65 million years after their last encounter, Sledge returns to Earth to confront Keeper and the Rangers. While the team compares their personal histories, Tyler discovers Fury is identical to a picture in his dad's diary, meaning Fury was involved in his disappearance ten years earlier. The Rangers' plan to fight Sledge is compromised when Tyler goes after Fury on his own. The Rangers must learn to work as a team to defeat a monster named Scrapper, but will Tyler be able to come through, or will his mission to find his dad get in the way?
4	4	"Return of the Caveman"	Charlie Haskell	Chip Lynn	February 28, 2015	1.92
Chase and Koda are trapped in a cave by Slammer, one of Sledge's monsters. Koda must rely on his caveman instincts to save himself, Chase, and a young boy named Peter. Meanwhile, the Rangers get new Dino Cycles and Riley gains use of the Raptor Zord.
5	5	"Breaking Black"	Charlie Haskell	Jeffrey Newman, Peter Wiseman & Chip Lynn	March 7, 2015	1.50
A Maori fortune teller, called Moana, asks Chase for help guarding her shop against a potential thief, but Chase falls under the spell of Sledge's latest monster, Spellbinder. Still puzzled over how a slacker like Chase ended up a Ranger, Moana tells the others how the Black Energem, once under her care, ended up with Chase, which changes their entire view of him. The Rangers must find a way to help Chase before he is completely controlled. The first use of Dino Spike and Chase gains the use of the Para Zord.
6	6	"The Tooth Hurts"	Mike Smith	Jeffrey Newman, Peter Wiseman & Chip Lynn	March 14, 2015	1.29
When faced with the chef monster known as Cavity, Chase ends up with a serious problem. Meanwhile, the logical Riley is annoyed when he cannot counter a move Fury used in their first battle, causing Chase to ridicule him for repeatedly trying to overcome it in a single way. Riley thinks Chase doesn't take the threat seriously but soon learns that Chase has a different approach to things than he does.
7	7	"Let Sleeping Zords Lie"	Mike Smith	Chip Lynn	March 21, 2015	2.01
The search for the five missing Energems and Zords goes nowhere, especially when Shelby spends the day NOT helping the boys dig. Determined to demonstrate her value to both Kendall and the Rangers, Shelby uses her advanced dinosaur knowledge to determine a new way of searching, so she and Kendall create the E-Tracer. This device will search the planet for traces of the Energems' unique power. Deciding first to search for Aqua energy, they are soon put on the trail of the Ankylo Zord but discover that Sledge's newest monster has stung the Zord, sending it wild.
8	8	"Double Ranger, Double Danger"	Mike Smith	Peter Wiseman, Tanya M. Wheeler & Chip Lynn	April 4, 2015	1.48
After creating a Gold PteraCharger, the team's trust is put under pressure when clone Rangers created by a branding iron themed monster steal the real Rangers' irreplaceable tracking device, the E-Tracer, forcing Tyler to make the hard decision of whether to recover or destroy the device. Unfortunately before he can make his choice, Fury learns the location of the powerful Ptera Zord and steals the PteraCharger.
9	9	"When Logic Fails"	Charlie Haskell	Chip Lynn	August 22, 2015 (Note: This episode was first broadcast in Brazil on August 3, 2015, and made available on the Nickelodeon website on August 15, 2015.)	1.59
Working with Fury, Puzzler captures the Dino Charge Rangers until Riley's logical mind helps them break free. But the delay has allowed Fury time to head toward the Ptera Zord.
10	10	"The Royal Rangers"	Charlie Haskell	Chip Lynn	August 29, 2015 (Note: This episode was first broadcast in Brazil on August 10, 2015, and made available on the Nickelodeon website on August 22, 2015.)	1.69
The museum receives a shipment for a special exhibit called "The Stone of Zandar," whereas the stone turns out to be the Golden Energem. So the Rangers trick Fury into thinking that the Energem around the neck of the princess (Shelby) of Zandar, who made an appearance with her prince (Tyler), was the actual Golden Energem. In the end, Tyler battles Fury, and as he is about to finish Fury off when he makes a shocking discovery about the energy that Fury has trapped within himself.
11	11	"Break Out"	Charlie Haskell	Chip Lynn	September 12, 2015 (Note: This episode was first broadcast in France on August 30, 2015, and made available on the Nickelodeon website on August 29, 2015.)	1.41
The Prince of Zandar, Phillip III, travels to Amber Beach to reclaim his nation's treasures, outraged that Tyler and Shelby imitated him. He takes the Gold Energem, giving Fury a chance to steal it from him. But before he can use it to power the Ptera Zord, the Rangers stop him. Tyler hesitates again to destroy Fury when the ghost inside him emerges again, which Tyler believes is his father. The Ghost escapes and is revealed to be instead Sir Ivan, the knight who found the Gold Energem 800 years ago and trapped inside Fury ever since. Ivan uses the Energem to become the Gold Ranger and take control of the Ptera Charge Megazord. After witnessing the battle and discovering the truth about his national treasure, Prince Phillip returns the Gold Energem to its rightful owner, Sir Ivan. He tells him to use it to protect the innocent as he has always done.
12	12	"Knight After Knights"	Peter Salmon	Jeffrey Newman & Chip Lynn	September 19, 2015 (Note: This episode was first broadcast in France on August 30, 2015, and made available on the Nickelodeon website on September 13, 2015.)	1.37
The Rangers must demonstrate their value to persuade their latest ally, Ivan, the Gold Ranger, who has left them to fight alone as he does not think they have the bravery and courage of knights despite also being Rangers, Shelby is shocked about this since Ivan would still be stuck inside of Fury if it weren't for the Rangers. They find they do not have the willpower to do so when one of Sledge's monsters steals their courage. But when Ivan's newest team of makeshift heroes fails to meet his hopes, he realizes that courage comes in different forms and must fight with the Rangers rather than compete against them, Ivan helps the Rangers destroy Bones and decides to become an official member of the Dino Charge Rangers.
13 (Note: Saban Brands regards episode 13, "Sync or Swim," as the official 800th episode of the Power Rangers series.)	13	"Sync or Swim"	Peter Salmon	Chip Lynn & James W. Bates	October 3, 2015 (Note: This episode was first broadcast in France on September 1, 2015.)	1.01
The Museums Fossil Fun Day is upon them, but when Ivan arrives on horseback in full armor, Tyler finds himself unable to keep his feelings in check. Tyler and Ivan's playful rivalry interfere with the Rangers' plan to defuse a bomb that Sledge and his monsters have planted. In the end, not only do Tyler and Ivan set aside their differences, but the others are driven to irritation by their newfound friendship.
14	14	"True Black"	Peter Salmon	Chip Lynn & Mark Litton	October 10, 2015	1.34
Chase mocks Shelby for a pop band she wants to see in New Zealand. But they are thrown into action when a monster attack leaves three Rangers buried underground, Chase's effort to use his new Black Armor X fails, causing him to question whether the fault is in the technology, or in himself. Whatever it is, he must find it quick if he is to save the day.
15	15	"The Ghostest With the Mostest"	Charlie Haskell	Chip Lynn & Mark Litton	October 17, 2015	1.07
When a monster kidnaps a Ranger and takes on their appearance during a Halloween party, Kendall must discover which of the team is the fake before their Energems are stolen.
16	16	"Rise of a Ranger"	Mike Smith	Chip Lynn & Mark Litton	October 24, 2015 (Note: This episode was first broadcast in France on September 2, 2015.)	1.11
Still inspired by his encounter with the Rangers, Prince Phillip finds the Graphite Energem. However, it doesn't bond with him, despite his best attempts. After many tries, he gives the gem over to the rangers, only for them to be attacked by Fury. Keeper identifies that the Prince's attempts were not genuine heroism, but after he saves Chase's sister, the Energem finally bonds with him, giving the Team a new ally and the mighty PachyZord to save the day. Prince Phillip returns to Zandar with the Graphite Energem in his care but promises to return if he is needed.
17	17	"No Matter How You Slice It"	Mike Smith	Chip Lynn & Jeffrey Newman	November 7, 2015	1.13
After a monster breaks the Power Rangers' bonds of friendship during the preparation for Riley's birthday, their distrust in each other not only threatens to destroy the team but also causes the Energems to lose power and risk dying. Riley and Koda must work together to find a way to restore the bonds between them but also save the Energems.
18	18	"World Famous! (in New Zealand)"	Mike Smith	Chip Lynn & Becca Barnes	November 14, 2015 (Note: This episode was first broadcast in France on September 15, 2015.)	1.06
When tracking down Sledge's activities in Auckland, New Zealand, the Power Rangers meet Albert, a self-proclaimed adventurer, and Bigfoot hunter. Over lunch, the team chases a thief only to discover he has been captured by the Purple Ranger, who is then attacked by Sledge's monsters. Defending their comrade, they are surprised to learn his identity as Albert, who bonded to his Energem while saving a little girl. Despite the offer to join the team, Albert is reluctant to fight. After Tyler catches him fleeing from a battle, Albert reveals that he is a fraud: his adventures are made up, and his eyepatch is just for show. Despite this, Tyler can show Albert that he does have real courage when needed. However, Albert decides to stay away from the fight and is unbonded from the Purple Energem but proud to have made friends.
19	19	"Deep Down Under"	Peter Salmon	Chip Lynn & Becca Barnes	November 21, 2015	1.50
Still in New Zealand, the Rangers are hunting for the PlesioZord, which they reckon is awake due to the Purple Ranger they encountered. Shelby visits Paleontologist Dr. Runga in search of leads, but he doesn't take them seriously, only giving them a general clue. Tyler and Shelby manage to find and record some cell phone video of the PlesioZord, but Meteor attacks them before reaching it. Seeing a chance for increased fame, Dr. Runga steals the video from Shelby's phone, thinking it's of a real Plesiosaur, and while telling him off, Shelby reveals that Runga was her idol as a child, which drove her to study dinosaurs. The Rangers find the PlesioZord and manage to rescue both it and the Purple Energem, giving them more power.
20	20	"Wishing for a Hero"	Peter Salmon	Chip Lynn	November 28, 2015 (Note: This episode was first broadcast in France on September 16, 2015.)	1.17
Not wanting to run the risk of leaving an unbonded Energem lying around, the Rangers try to find a hero to bond to the Purple Energem by staging accidents to force people to save Kendall but to no avail. Learning of this, Sledge makes a deal with his most dangerous villain, someone even his crew is afraid of, called Heckyl to trick the Rangers in return for shared dominance of the universe. A monster makes their wishes come true, with disastrous consequences. The Rangers realize the deception too late as Kendall gives the Purple Energem to her "hero," Heckyl. Before he can reveal his power, Fury intervenes and steals the Purple Energem, which he gives to Sledge, who uses its power to return Heckyl to his cell.
21	21	"Race to Rescue Christmas"	Charlie Haskell	Chip Lynn & Mark Litton	December 5, 2015	1.22
When Poisandra steals Santa's naughty-or-nice computer in the hopes of finding the Rangers' secret base, it's up to the Rangers to get it back before Christmas is canceled.
22	22	"One More Energem"	Peter Salmon	Chip Lynn & Becca Barnes	December 12, 2015	1.30
Kendall creates a robot to plant on Sledge's ship to recover the Purple Energem, and to help the Rangers, aided by Prince Phillip, fight Sledge. Unfortunately, Sledge ends up taking the Red Energem and leaves the Rangers defeated and with Keeper as a prisoner. Kendall stows away onboard to Sledge's ship. While the others fight a new Monster with the Zords, Shelby and a powerless Tyler use the PlesioZord to fly to Sledge's ship. Kendall recovers the Purple Energem and saves Keeper, and is transformed into the new Purple Ranger. Joining them, Tyler overhears Sledge's plan to wire the Red Energem to the weapons and destroy the Megazord in one hit, so he sends the others to assist in fighting the monster, leaving him alone on the ship. Tyler must recover his Energem before his friends are destroyed and must fight Sledge one-on-one to save the world.

=== Season 2: Power Rangers Dino Super Charge (2016) ===
No. overall	No. in season	Title	Directed by	Written by	Original release date	U.S. viewers (millions)
23	1	"When Evil Stirs"	Peter Burger	Chip Lynn & Becca Barnes	January 30, 2016	1.34
Snide awakens in the remains of Sledge's ship. However, it is hinted that Sledge might still be alive as everyone else on the ship (Poisandra, Wrench, Curio, and Fury, as well as the countless prisoners, Spikeballs and Vivix) did survive. Snide is then revealed to be Heckyl from "Wishing for a Hero" and sends a revived Ice Age to bring him the Energems. Meanwhile, Koda misses the Rangers and tries to contact them after getting postcards, but none pick up. Kendall gets a message from Tyler, just as they and Ivan are ambushed by Ice Age, who has frozen all the Rangers. Koda returns to the base where he finds Tyler, who escaped and Keeper. Koda also reveals his fear of ice but manages to unfreeze everyone with Tyler thanks to a confidence boost. The Rangers deal with Ice Age and finally destroy him with the Plesio Charge Megazord Pachy-Rex formation. In the end, the Rangers celebrate as Prince Phillip appears.
24	2	"Forgive and Forget"	Peter Burger	Chip Lynn, Becca Barnes, and Alwyn Dale	February 6, 2016	1.20
Heckyl launches a new plan to find the Rangers' base and take the Energems using Stingrage's venom, which has been modified to cause amnesia. At the same time, Riley's old school rival shows up in town, and Riley becomes determined to best him in an athletic contest. Snide interferes with Heckyl's plans, but Heckyl takes advantage of it and manages to infiltrate the Rangers' lab before employing a revived Stingrage to contaminate the city's water supply with his venom. Riley takes part in a marathon against his rival as the plan unfolds. After helping him regain his memory, Riley learns that the bully's teasing was derived from his envy of Riley's academic abilities. The Rangers defeat and destroy Stingrage, whose venom then wipes the villains' short-term memories, leaving them once again unaware of where the Rangers' base is hidden.
25	3	"Nightmare in Amber Beach"	Peter Burger	Chip Lynn, Becca Barnes, and Alwyn Dale	February 13, 2016	1.37
Shelby is under pressure from her father to study business so that she can one day take over his company, Watkins Ice Cream. Seeing how she is pushing herself, Heckyl schemes to defeat the Rangers by employing Nightmare, a monster whose powers cause the Rangers to fall asleep and then move about in the grip of a dream. Forced to remain awake, the Rangers have many close calls but eventually catch Heckyl in the act of trying to steal their Energems. They then confront Nightmare and destroy him, while Shelby's father realizes that he has denied Shelby the chance to follow her dreams.
26	4	"A Date with Danger"	Karl Zwicky	Chip Lynn & Marc Handler	February 20, 2016	1.19
A dangerous new enemy named Singe appears on Earth and joins Snide's forces, much to Fury's dismay, while Tyler meets with the last man to have seen his father before his disappearance ten years previously. Meanwhile, Chase tries impressing his new girlfriend Kaylee, but things don't go well when she falls for his alter-ego, the Black Ranger, and breaks up with Chase. Chase briefly dates her by donning his Ranger form and meeting with her, and in the process, gets to know her better than he did previously. However, after getting some advice from Keeper, he breaks up with her as the Black Ranger, only to end up coming to her rescue in civilian form when Singe kidnaps her to lure the Rangers out into the open. Singe battles the Rangers and proves a formidable foe even for their Megazord but retreats after Fury sabotages the Magna Beam.
27	5	"Roar of the Red Ranger"	Karl Zwicky	Chip Lynn, Becca Barnes, and Alwyn Dale	February 27, 2016	1.20
Tyler takes his friends to a campsite that he and his father visited for years and expresses his continued hopes that his father might still be alive, though the others, (particularly Shelby) fear that his father may be gone. Singe then employs the monster Ninja to infect the Rangers' systems with a computer virus, which infects Tyler during the test of his new T-Rex Super Charger, causing him to behave as though he were a T-Rex. While searching for him, the Rangers engage Ninja and another monster, Hunter, while Chase attempts to bring Tyler back to his senses. Fortunately, the Aqua Ranger, who previously appeared to defend Tyler from Ninja, arrives and reveals himself to be none other than Tyler's father. The latter discovered the Aqua Energem ten years ago. Working together, the Rangers destroy Ninja in both normal and giant forms, while Hunter returns to the ship and is recruited for Singe's new plan while Tyler's father James officially joins the Rangers.
28	6	"Forged Under Fire"	Karl Zwicky	Chip Lynn, Ann Austen, Becca Barnes, and Alwyn Dale	March 5, 2016	1.78
Singe implements a new plan to defeat the Rangers by using power-disabling rings against their Energems. This effort leaves all of the Rangers, but Kendall, Prince Phillip, and James powerless, and Tyler's Energem is damaged and in danger of being irreparably damaged. It soon becomes clear that the only way to repair it is using hot magma, which requires Tyler to burrow deep into the Earth using his failing powers. The remaining three Rangers engaged Singe, Hunter, and their forces and are soon joined by Tyler and the others, who manage to regain their powers. After Hunter is destroyed, Heckyl locks Fury and Singe into the same cell to force them to learn to cooperate. Meanwhile, James and Keeper decide that the Aqua Ranger's talents would be best served, continuing the search for the Silver Energem by himself.
29	7	"Home Run Koda"	Michael Duignan	Chip Lynn & Becca Barnes	March 19, 2016	1.50
Kendall creates a new Dino Charger that requires the five core Energems to run it. This gets complicated when Riley becomes Koda's coach on the Amber Beach Earthquakes baseball team making it hard to pull away from the game at the time when Gameface is used by Heckyl to train the Vivix into getting into better Ranger-fighting shape.
30	8	"Riches and Rags"	Michael Duignan	Chip Lynn, Becca Barnes, and Alwyn Dale	March 26, 2016	1.38
Ivan has put the Amber Beach Dinosaur Museum in debt after mistaking a 1,000-year-old suit of honor as a training dummy. Meanwhile, Heckyl creates a Spellbinder/Gold Digger hybrid named Spell Digger. This hybrid monster is then sent to spread greed to anyone who touches his gold coins.
31	9	"Besties 4Eva"	Michael Duignan	Becca Barnes & Alwyn Dale	August 20, 2016 (Note: This episode was first broadcast in Australia on August 14, 2016.)	1.23
Shelby's friend Erin drops by and makes waves with the team. Shelby reveals that she secretly resents Erin as she's never actually achieved anything, since she simply takes credit for other people's work. Erin then becomes a target for Snide after she's told the world that she is the Pink Ranger!
32	10	"Gone Fishin"	Michael Duignan	Alwyn Dale, Becca Barnes, and Chip Lynn	August 27, 2016 (Note: This episode was first broadcast in Australia on August 21, 2016.)	1.44
The Rangers receive a message from the Silver Ranger, but Fury's message pod is destroyed before it can be relayed. Meanwhile, Shelby, Koda, and Chase join Riley and his brother Matt on a fishing trip, but things take a bad turn when Matt is thrown into the lake by a monster. To everyone's surprise, Matt finds himself saved by something buried at the bottom of the lake.
33	11	"Love at First Fight"	Peter Burger	Chip Lynn, Ann Austen, and Becca Barnes	September 3, 2016	1.42
Beauticruel plans to use Poisandra's magic makeup to make any man fall love in with her, starting with the Red Ranger; Heckyl devises a plan to steal the Rangers' Energems.
34	12	"Catching Some Rays"	Peter Burger	Becca Barnes, Alwyn Dale, and David McDermott	September 10, 2016	1.40
After a surprise visit by Kendall's grandmother Betty, the Rangers visit Koda's old cave, but after ignoring a warning left by Koda's grandfather, they accidentally release a monster which causes people to become focused only on taking a vacation.
35	13	"Recipe for Disaster"	Peter Burger	Chip Lynn, Becca Barnes and Alwyn Dale	September 24, 2016	1.41
Chase recreates his dessert recipe from New Zealand for food critic Catherine Allister, who threatens to shut down the Dino Bite. Meanwhile, Singe returns to Earth along with his boss: Lord Arcanon, and his associate Doomwing. Heckyl immediately tries to overpower them using his newest monster; however, Arcanon reveals his secret weapon: Dino Chargers! With bad guys in control of their Zords, can the Rangers regain control? Note: When the Dino Charge Ultrazord is formed, it features, on its chest armor, pictures of 10 of the 11 Mesozoic creatures upon which the Rangers' Zords are based (they are dinosaurs unless otherwise noted); Tyrannosaurus rex (red), Velociraptor (green), Titanosaurus (silver), Stegosaurus (blue), Ankylosaurus (aqua), Pachycephalosaurus (graphite), Triceratops (pink), Parasaurolophus (black), the pterosaur Pteranodon (gold), and the plesiosaur Plesiosaurus (purple). It does not feature the Spinosaurus (navy blue) upon which the Spino Zord is based. It also features 13 other Mesozoic creatures; Deinonychus (yellow), Fukuiraptor (scarlet), Allosaurus (crimson), Oviraptor (vermilion), Diplodocus (indigo), Kentrosaurus (azure), Styracosaurus (magenta), Iguanodon (lavender), the pterosaur Tupandactylus (white), the giant crocodilian Deinosuchus (orange), the plesiosaur Futabasaurus (gray), the giant sea turtle Archelon (cornflower), and the giant ammonite Parapuzosia (turquoise). These extra markings represent the auxiliary chargers.
36	14	"Silver Secret"	Ric Pellizzeri	Chip Lynn, Becca Barnes, and Alwyn Dale	October 1, 2016	1.62
The Rangers are still reeling from their new enemy Lord Arcanon having Dino Chargers. When the Silver Ranger lands on Earth, he explains he was captured and forced to create 9 Dino Chargers, but Riley's suspicion soon reveals the truth, including a secret about the Silver Ranger no one expected. Meanwhile, Shelby is ecstatic when the N-Zed Boys come to Amber Beach to recruit a new member, leaving Tyler jealous of the attention she gets from the Lead Singer.
37	15	"Trick or Trial"	Michael Duignan	Becca Barnes, Alwyn Dale, and Chip Lynn	October 8, 2016	1.33
The Rangers are summoned to an intergalactic trial for crimes against the monsters they have destroyed, with them always seen in a negative light. However, Kendall and Ivan realize the truth and must work to free their teammates from the ultimate punishment: Destruction!
38	16	"Wings of Danger"	Ric Pellizzeri	Becca Barnes, Alwyn Dale, and Chip Lynn	October 15, 2016	1.06
The Rangers are out training in the woods when they overhear Zenowing doing likewise, only for him to react coldly when they express admiration for his abilities. Doomwing then arrives to challenge his good half to a battle, and in the ensuing conflict, Riley is injured while protecting Zenowing; Keeper then arrives to transport all the Rangers to safety. Zenowing is initially harsh regarding Riley's condition, but Keeper soon determines that Doomwing's influence kept him from experiencing positive emotions while they were joined together. Having been warned by Arcanon that he will be destroyed if he fails to capture Zenowing, Doomwing orders Wrench to recreate several defeated monsters for a massive attack against the Rangers. Meanwhile, Heckyl makes a deal with Poisandra, promising to share a secret in exchange for help. Zenowing uses his powers to heal Riley before going to confront Doomwing, only to be captured and nearly remerged with his evil side by the Dark Energem; however, a recovered Riley arrives and saves him as the other Rangers arrive to help. Arcanon leaves Doomwing to be destroyed while Singe and Fury search for the misplaced Dark Energem. After an intense battle, the Rangers destroy the revived monsters, and Zenowing can reclaim the Silver Energem and destroy Doomwing by morphing. Back aboard Sledge's ship, Poisandra gives Heckyl an explosive that allows him to break out of his cell. Still, upon seeing Singe returning the Dark Energem to Arcanon, he remembers his true past as an inhabitant of Sentai 6 who attempted to keep the Dark Energem away from Arcanon only to have Snide created as his evil half in the process. Heckyl is then re-imprisoned, swearing revenge on Arcanon as he does so, while Zenowing bonds with his fellow Rangers.
39	17	"Freaky Fightday"	Ric Pellizzeri	Alwyn Dale, Becca Barnes, and Chip Lynn	October 22, 2016	1.34
Gameface and Nightmare are revived, and another monster comes and switches the Rangers' bodies around; Tyler is Shelby, Koda is Chase, Shelby is Tyler, Chase is Koda, Riley is Ivan, & Ivan is Riley. Meanwhile, a graffiti artist using the museum's walls for his personal spray paint canvases turns out to be Ivan's descendant. However, the two have trouble finding common ground.
40	18	"Worgworld"	Michael Duignan	Becca Barnes, Alwyn Dale, and Chip Lynn	October 29, 2016	1.51
A pair of monstrous musicians named Conductro & Screech are turning whoever listens to their music turns into zombies. Meanwhile, Sledge returns from the apparent dead and launches a mutiny against Arcanon.
41	19	"The Rangers Rock"	Michael Duignan	Becca Barnes, Alwyn Dale, and Chip Lynn	November 5, 2016	1.38
A new monster called Badussa attacks the Rangers, turning most of them into stone. To save her mostly-petrified comrades, Shelby must work with Zenowing to create a new Zord modeled after a Spinosaur.
42	20	"Edge of Extinction"	Britta Hawkins	Becca Barnes, Alwyn Dale, and Chip Lynn	November 12, 2016	1.42
The Rangers find a Greenzilla Egg in Amber Beach. Snide helps Sledge prepare for his wedding and hears him plotting against him. At the Dino Bite Café, the Rangers give Heckyl his food, and he talks to the Rangers and warns them about the upcoming doom. The Rangers look at the Greenzilla egg. The eggs hatch, and another explodes in the base. Ten Rangers morph in the base and successfully destroy it. Tyler takes the Spino Charge Megazord Ankylo-Pachy formation, Shelby and Koda take Dino Charge Megazord Tri-Stego formation. Chase, Ivan, and Riley take Ptera Charge Megazord Para-Raptor formation, Aqua and Graphite take Plesio Charge Megazord, and Silver takes Titano Charge Megazord. Meanwhile, Heckyl has fun as he enjoys his remaining time on Earth by doing daring stunts and rides. Tyler uses the Dino Super Drive Saber to defeat his Greenzilla. Sledge marries Poisandra, and she falls in the cake. Snide steals the Dark Energem. The other rangers struggle fighting against the Greenzillas, and Heckyl watches them until he decides to help them after helping a girl find her mom. Heckyl watches a transport pod land in Amber Beach. Koda and Shelby activate the Dino Charge Megazord Tri-Ankylo formation, and the Greenzilla is defeated. Tyler and the Spino Zord help Chase, Ivan, and Riley. They form the Spino Charge Megazord Para-Raptor formation and defeat the Greenzilla. Graphite and Aqua form Plesio Charge Megazord Pachy-formation and defeat Greenzilla. Zenowing is given the auxiliary chargers and destroys his Greenzilla. Snide enters the museum and starts destroying it as well as finding the base. Snide destroys the crystal pods, and Kendall fights against him, but Snide is too strong with the Dark Energem. Heckyl soon arrives and attacks Snide, and he retreats. Heckyl and Kendall run after Snide, but Shelby and Koda knock him over with the Dino Cycle. Snide is too powerful for the rangers. Silver, Aqua, and Graphite arrive. Black, Gold, Red, and Green arrive with Dino Charge Ultrazord. Snide summons the Magna beam, but Sledge decides not to fire it. Silver, Blue, Graphite, Heckyl, Pink, Purple, and Aqua prepare a blast attack, while the others prepare the Titano Cannon. Snide is killed. Sledge and Poisandra marry but discover that Snide took the Dark Energem. The Dark Energem survived, and the rangers thank Heckyl but discover Fury is in the base.
43	21	"End of Extinction"	Britta Hawkins	Becca Barnes, Alwyn Dale, and Chip Lynn	November 19, 2016	1.54
The Rangers thank Heckyl and head back to base. Wrench and Sledge watch this from space. Sledge makes 4 of the eggs act as anchors, planning to drag the planet out of the orbit of the sun. The Rangers fight Vivix and Spikeballs outside the base. Fury confronts Keeper, but the Rangers rescue him. Fury retreats, and the Rangers receive a message from Sledge. Sledge fires four beams from his ship, and they attach to the eggs as a winch. Sledge pulls the planet away from the sun. The Rangers come up with a plan to throw the Dark Energem into space and have everyone on Earth hold up mirrors, believing that the Dark Energem could be destroyed if it was bombarded with enough light. The plan is successful, but the Dark Energem turns into a black hole which absorbs the Earth and Sledge's ship. Keeper reveals that with the Dark Energem destroyed, the Rangers can now activate the "ultimate power" of their own Energems, which turns out to be time travel. Keeper sends the Rangers back to the day he entrusted the Energems to the dinosaurs. While James, Phillip, Kendall, Zenowing, and Heckyl take over Sledge's ship, the other Rangers battle Sledge and Fury on Earth, destroying Fury. After taking control of the ship, the Rangers use it to capture Sledge in a net and set a course to fly directly into the sun, destroying Sledge and his entire army in the process. Keeper sends the Rangers back to the present, although Koda and Ivan opt to return to their own time periods instead. Heckyl and Zenowing are sent to Sentai 6 to prevent Arcanon from destroying the planet and seizing the Dark Energem. Heckyl is appointed Keeper of the Dark Energem, ensuring it is not used for evil again. The present-day Rangers arrive home and find that their museum is now a dinosaur zoo, as their past actions have prevented the extinction of the dinosaurs.
44	22	"Here Comes Heximas"	Michael Duignan	Becca Barnes, Alwyn Dale, and Chip Lynn	December 10, 2016	1.69
As Keeper & the Rangers are reunited in time for Christmas, Tyler and Kendall realize the rest of the team are missing. Tyler then finds that they all received a present of a cursed lump of coal from Heximas, the sole survivor from Sledge's crew. The coal turns four of the Rangers into evil elves, and must be reminded of their past to break the spell.

== Item ==
- Power Rangers TQG

TQG Morpher
TQG Blade Blaster
TQG Buckle
TQG6 Smart Phone Morpher
TQG6 Baton
TQG Blaster
TQG Sword
TQG Gun
TQG Hammer
TQG Ax
TQG Claw
TQG Power Cannon
TQG Train
