= Power Rangers Turbo =

American superhero television series

- Genre: Action-adventure; Comedy; Science fantasy; Superhero
- Created by: Haim Saban; Toei Company
- Based on: Turbo: A Power Rangers Movie by 20th Century Fox, Saban Entertainment and Toei Company; Gekisou Sentai Carranger by Toei Company
- Developed by: Saban Entertainment; Toei Company
- Starring: Johnny Yong Bosch; Nakia Burrise; Blake Foster; Jason David Frank; Catherine Sutherland; Carol Hoyt; Gregg Bullock; Tracy Lynn Cruz; Patricia Ja Lee; Roger Velasco; Selwyn Ward; Jason Narvy; Paul Schrier; Hilary Shepard Turner
- Theme music composer: Ron Wasserman
- Composers: Kenneth Burgomaster; Jim Cushinery; Paul Gordon; Jeremy Sweet; Ron Wasserman; Inon Zur; Glenn Scott Lacey
- Countries of origin: United States; Japan
- Original language: English
- No. of episodes: 45

Production
- Executive producers: Haim Saban; Shuki Levy
- Producer: Jonathan Tzachor
- Production locations: California (Greater Los Angeles Area) (Santa Clarita & Los Angeles); Japan (Greater Tokyo Area) (Tokyo, Saitama, Yokohama and Kyoto)
- Cinematography: Ilan Rosenberg
- Running time: 20–21 minutes
- Production companies: Saban Entertainment; Fox Kids Worldwide; Renaissance Atlantic Entertainment; Toei Company, Ltd. MMPR Productions, Inc.

Original release
- Network: Fox (Fox Kids)
- Release: April 19 – November 24, 1997

Related
- Power Rangers television series

Power Rangers Turbo is a television series and the fifth entry of the Power Rangers franchise that aired in 1997. The show was prefaced with the franchise's second film, Turbo: A Power Rangers Movie.

As with its predecessors, Power Rangers Turbo is based on one of the entries of the Super Sentai series; in Turbo's case, the source is the 20th series, Gekisou Sentai Carranger. The series introduced a child actor as the new Blue Ranger, thus becoming the sole series so far to feature a pre-teen Ranger, and featured the departure of long-running characters Zordon and Alpha 5; the veteran team of Rangers also departed, with four new characters being introduced as their replacements. The series also marked the final regular appearances of Johnny Yong Bosch, Catherine Sutherland, and Steve Cardenas, as well as the last appearance of Nakia Burrise.

== Plot ==
After Maligore's defeat, the Turbo Power Rangers, Tommy Oliver, Adam Park, Tanya Sloan and Katherine Hillard graduate from high school, while the new 12-year-old Blue Ranger, Justin Stewart, skips ahead a couple of grades and gets to go to Angel Grove High. Seeking revenge, Divatox begins to attack the Rangers. At the beginning of the season, the Rangers’ longtime mentors, Zordon and Alpha 5 depart to return to Zordon's home planet of Eltar, making way for the spectral Dimitria of Inquiris and Alpha 6. Other changes are also seen as Ernie leaves Angel Grove to do volunteer work in South America and Lt. Stone takes over the Juice Bar. Also an ally, the Blue Senturion arrives from the year 2000, with a message for Dimitria and the Rangers that Lord Zedd, Rita Repulsa, The Machine Empire and Divatox will team up to destroy the universe, but fails to show the complete message due to Divatox corrupting the end of it.

Later, Tommy, Adam, Tanya and Katherine, who are leaving for new chapters of their lives, are asked to pass on their powers to a new group of people. They choose T.J. Johnson, Carlos Vallerte, Ashley Hammond and Cassie Chan as the new Red, Green, Yellow and Pink Rangers respectively with Justin still being the Blue Ranger. The new team of Rangers are also joined by another ally, the Phantom Ranger, a mysterious being from another world. The team eventually learns that Dark Specter has captured Zordon, though Zordon is able to warn the Rangers not to rescue him as it would leave Earth defenseless. A short while later, the Rangers lose both the Turbo and Rescue Megazords in a battle with Divatox's most powerful monster yet, Goldgoyle. As Dimitria and the Blue Senturion leave for Eltar to help Zordon, Divatox finds the Power Chamber's location. Her army of grunts and monsters infiltrate the Chamber, defeating the team and destroying the Power Chamber. However, before Divatox tries to finish off the Rangers, she receives a message that Zordon has been captured and under the order of Dark Specter leaves for the Cimmerian planet. The powerless Rangers then leave Earth and head for space to save Zordon, with Justin choosing to stay behind with his father. These events lead to the next incarnation of the franchise, Power Rangers in Space.

== Cast and characters ==
=== Turbo Rangers ===
Original team

- Jason David Frank as Tommy Oliver
  The original Red Turbo Ranger and original leader of the Turbo Rangers; previously the Mighty Morphin Green Ranger, the Mighty Morphin White Ranger, and the Red Zeo Ranger. He is Katherine Hillard's love interest. He piloted the Red Lightning Turbozord and his primary weapon was the Turbo Lightning Sword.
- Blake Foster as Justin Stewart
  The Blue Turbo Ranger; when Rocky DeSantos injured himself due to training practice, Justin was chosen by Zordon to be his replacement. Justin is a talented martial artist, however, was 12 years old and shorter than the other members. So, to compensate for his youth, he was able to morph into an adult-sized form as the Blue Ranger. Justin is the only common member between the original and new team of Turbo Rangers. He piloted the Mountain Blaster Turbozord and the Siren Blaster Rescuezord. His primary weapon was the Turbo Hand Blasters.
- Johnny Yong Bosch as Adam Park
  The original Green Turbo Ranger; previously the second Mighty Morphin Black Ranger and the Green Zeo Ranger. He piloted the Desert Thunder Turbozord and his primary weapon was the Turbo Thunder Cannon.
- Nakia Burrise as Tanya Sloan
  The original Yellow Turbo Ranger; formerly the Yellow Zeo Ranger. She piloted the Dune Star Turbozord and her primary weapon was the Turbo Star Chargers.
- Catherine Sutherland as Katherine "Kat" Hillard
  The original Pink Turbo Ranger; previously the second Mighty Morphin Pink Ranger and the Pink Zeo Ranger. She is Tommy Oliver's love interest. She piloted the Wind Chaser Turbozord and her primary weapon was the Turbo Wind Fire.

New team

- Selwyn Ward as Theodore Jay "T.J." Jarvis Johnson
  T.J. is the new Red Turbo Ranger and new leader of the Turbo Rangers. A friendly and warm-hearted baseball player, he was chosen by Tommy to be his replacement based on his bravery in protecting others. He piloted the Red Lightning Turbozord and the Lightning Fire Tamer Rescuezord. His primary weapon is the Turbo Lightning Sword.
- Roger Velasco as Carlos Vallerte
  Carlos is the new Green Turbo Ranger. A proud and determined soccer player, he was chosen by Adam to be his replacement because he proved himself to be decisive and intelligent. He piloted the Desert Thunder Turbozord and the Thunder Loader Rescuezord. His primary weapon is the Turbo Thunder Cannon.
- Tracy Lynn Cruz as Ashley Hammond
  Ashley is the new Yellow Turbo Ranger. An upbeat and hardworking cheerleader, she was chosen by Tanya to be her replacement due to her compassion and integrity. She piloted the Dune Star Turbozord and the Star Racer Rescuezord. Her primary weapon is the Turbo Star Chargers.
- Patricia Ja Lee as Cassie Chan
  Cassie is the new Pink Turbo Ranger. A gutsy and sarcastic singer, she was chosen by Katherine to be her replacement because she is loyal and trustworthy. She piloted the Wind Chaser Turbozord and Wind Rescue Rescuezord. Her primary weapon is the Turbo Wind Fire.

=== Supporting characters ===
- Carol Hoyt as Dimitria
  Dimitria is a being from the planet Inquirus who succeeds Zordon as the Turbo Rangers' new mentor as he left for Eltar.
- Katerina Luciani as the voice of Alpha 6
  Alpha 6 is the successor Alpha 5.
- David Walsh as the voice of Blue Senturion
  An intergalactic police officer from the future.
- Paul Schrier and Jason Narvy as Bulk and Skull
  Initially turned into chimpanzees by Elgar, they are later restored and take on a series of odd jobs.
- Gregg Bullock as Jerome B. Stone
  When Ernie's peace corps recalled him to help "build a bridge in the Amazon," Jerome became the new proprietor of the Angel Grove Youth Center.
- Alex Dodd as the Phantom Ranger
  A mysterious Ranger whose powers come from Eltar.

=== Villains ===
- Carol Hoyt (episodes 1–25) and Hilary Shepard Turner (episodes 26–45) as Divatox
  The series' main villain and is known throughout the universe as the Queen of Evil, Dark Queen of Space and the Beautiful Queen of Darkness. Divatox is an intergalactic space pirate who leads a large number of cutthroats in her evil conquests throughout the universe. From her base, the gigantic fish-shaped submarine known as the Subcraft, Divatox and her minions travel about the universe plundering riches to satisfy Divatox's greed. Divatox would later pilot the eagle-like Eaglezord.
- Derek Stephen Prince as the voice of Elgar
  Divatox's dimwitted nephew who was armed with the Card Sword, named as such due to the blade looking like a row of playing cards. Elgar could fire blasts of energy from the sword, as well as teleport. He was also the one responsible for turning Bulk and Skull into chimpanzees during the earlier part of the series. Elgar would later pilot the cattle-horned Terrorzord.
- Lex Lang as the voice of Rygog
  The mutant servant of Divatox. He serves as her loyal warrior and able to fire lasers from his eyes. Rygog later pilots the golden lion-themed Catzord.
- Scott Page-Pagter as the voice of Porto
  An alien resembling a life raft with portholes in it that has limbs, with one showing his goggle-wearing face. Porto is Divatox's top adviser. He would later pilot the blue shark-themed Sharkzord.
- Tom Wyner as the voice of General Havoc
  Divatox's brother as well as the uncle of Elgar. Three times in his fight with the Rangers, General Havoc piloted the dinosaur-like Metallosaurus.

=== Guest stars ===
- Steve Cardenas as Rocky DeSantos; the former Mighty Morphin Red Ranger and Blue Zeo Ranger.
- Robert L. Manahan as the voice of Zordon
- Richard Steven Horvitz as the voice of Alpha 5
- Lex Lang (uncredited) as the voice of Lerigot
- Carol White as Mama D, Divatox and General Havoc's mother

== Film ==
Ep#	Title	Directed by	Written by	Theatrical Release	Code
0	Turbo: A Power Rangers Movie	David Winning and Shuki Levy	Shuki Levy and Shell Danielson	March 28, 1997	TBA
Divatox attacks the wizard Lerigot in an attempt to marry a demon named Maligore, in the hope of using his powers to plunder the universe. Lerigot escapes to Earth where he seeks help from Zordon and Alpha 5. When the Zeo powers are not enough to stop Divatox, the rangers create the Turbo powers. When Rocky injures himself preparing for a martial arts tournament, Zordon must choose a new Blue Ranger to take Rocky’s place and the new ranger turns out to be 12 year old Justin Stewart.

== Episodes ==
No.	Title	Directed by	Written by	Original release date	Prod. code
1	"Shift Into Turbo"	Douglas Sloan	Douglas Sloan	April 19, 1997	431
2	"Shift Into Turbo"	Douglas Sloan	Douglas Sloan	April 26, 1997	432
3	"Shift Into Turbo"	Douglas Sloan	Douglas Sloan	April 30, 1997	433
The Rangers are graduating Angel Grove High. Justin offers a healed Rocky the Blue Turbo Ranger powers so that he can resume his life as a Power Ranger; however, Rocky declines (due to still recuperating from his back injury). In the meantime, Divatox has amassed an army to get revenge on the Rangers, having her sub craft take up residence in Angel Grove lake. She sends Elgar to place a detonator in the Angel Grove Power Plant in order to take revenge on the Rangers and ruin their graduation. With the older Rangers attending their graduation ceremony, Justin must face Elgar (the latter of whom also managed to transform Bulk and Skull into chimpanzees) alone. When Justin doesn't return, Divatox attacks Tanya, Adam, and Katherine. Meanwhile, Zordon and Alpha are keeping a secret from the Rangers. The results of a test Justin took before the graduation then come back, and it turns out he's going to be starting high school due to being a prodigy. Zordon reveals that he and Alpha are returning to Eltar with Lerigot. However, Divatox begins trying to close the wormhole that is taking Zordon and Alpha home, and the Rangers successfully intervene to help their mentor and ally return home. Afterwards, Alpha 6 arrives in the Power Chamber, along with a new mentor, Dimitria.
4	"Shadow Rangers"	Judd Lynn	Mark Hoffmeier	May 1, 1997	433
Divatox sends the evil Chromite monster to Angel Grove with a detonator. When the Rangers try to stop him, he steals their morphing powers to create the Shadow Rangers. Tommy must find a way to stop Chromite and track down his missing friends by himself.
5	"Transmission Impossible"	Al Winchell	Barbara A. Oliver & Tony Oliver	May 2, 1997	435
Visceron travels from the planet Inquiris to deliver some startling news to Dimitria. Divatox learns this and captures him. She then turns him against the Rangers when he refuses to tell her his message.
6	"Rally Ranger"	Al Winchell	Jackie Marchand	May 5, 1997	436
Trying to impress his aunt Divatox, Elgar decides to sabotage a soapbox car race with a detonator he made himself. Meanwhile, Porto goes AWOL and attacks the city.
7	"Built for Speed"	Judd Lynn	Ralph Soll	May 6, 1997	437
Some of Adam's friends decide to settle an argument by drag racing. Divatox's Demon Racer plants a detonator in one of their cars. The Rangers have to defeat the Demon Racer and stop the detonator before it blows.
8	"Bicycle Built for the Blues"	Judd Lynn	Shell Danielson	May 7, 1997	442
It's Justin's birthday and Divatox has sent him a gift. The Rangers have to get Justin off his new bike before it explodes in 25 miles. If that was not bad enough, Divatox sends Big Burpa to distract them.
9	"The Whole Lie"	Al Winchell	Mark Litton	May 8, 1997	434
During a volunteer car wash, Porto appears and plants a detonator. Justin spots him, and the Mouthpiece monster attacks him and makes it so he can only tell lies. Meanwhile, Porto has made it, so anytime one of the Rangers lies, a Pirahantron attacks.
10	"Glyph Hanger"	Paul Schrier	Steven J. Weller	May 10, 1997	438
Divatox calls her ex-fiancé Pharaoh to help defeat the Rangers. She has him place a detonator shaped like a pyramid at the Egyptian Exhibit. Adam mistakenly takes home Pharaoh's staff, which turns any writing into hieroglyphics. The Rangers have to defeat the Pharaoh and stop the detonator before it goes off, but Divatox puts a forcefield around it so they cannot touch it.
11	"Weight and See"	Paul Schrier	Peter Elwell	May 12, 1997	439
Due to an insult from a rival ballet dancer, Kat worries about her weight. Divatox sends Numbor to attack the Rangers, rendering Kat weightless.
12	"Alarmed and Dangerous"	Paul Schrier	Brett Born	May 13, 1997	440
Justin deals with school bullies who sound a false fire alarm at school. Divatox sees this and sends her Pirahnatrons to set off more false alarms across town so she can plant a detonator on a fire truck.
13	"The Millennium Message"	Larry Litton	Mark Litton	May 17, 1997	443
The Blue Senturion, an intergalactic law enforcement robot, arrives from the year 2000 with a message for Dimitria; Lord Zedd, Rita, The Machine Empire, and Divatox will team up to destroy the universe. When Divatox learns of this message, she reprograms the Blue Senturion to think the Rangers are evil.
14	"A Drive to Win"	Larry Litton	Jackie Marchand	May 19, 1997	444
Divatox plants a detonator in the scoreboard at one of Adam's soccer games. If Angel Grove scores 4 goals, it will go off. She sends Electrovolt to distract the Rangers. Introducing: Tracy Lynn Cruz as Ashley, Roger Velasco as Carlos
15	"Cars Attacks"	Judd Lynn	Douglas Sloan	May 20, 1997	445
Lt. Stone's niece Jenny competes with Kat to get into London's Royal Dance Academy. Divatox decides to plant a detonator at the competition, disguised as a cassette player, and sends Wolfgang Amadeus Griller to distract the Rangers.
16	"Honey, I Shrunk the Rangers"	Judd Lynn	Shell Danielson	May 21, 1997	446
17	"Honey, I Shrunk the Rangers"	Koichi Sakamoto	Shell Danielson	September 9, 1997	501
Divatox sends Shrinkasect to mess with the Blue Senturion's hardware. The Shrinkasect monster shrinks the Rangers while Justin is trying to stop the chimp-ified Bulk and Skull from stealing Lt. Stone's car. The Rangers then attempt to break out of Divatox's submarine as Justin tries to unshrink the Blue Senturion and find the detonator that Bulk and Skull have mistakenly taken.
18	"Passing the Torch"	Shuki Levy	Shuki Levy & Shell Danielson	September 10, 1997	502
19	"Passing the Torch"	Shuki Levy	Shuki Levy & Shell Danielson	September 11, 1997	503
Divatox's mother, Mama D, visits and tells her to capture Tommy, and the rest of the Rangers will fall. When Pirahantrons attack Kat and Tommy, two new teens come to help them. Meanwhile, the Flamite monster attacks Tanya, Justin, and Adam while they set up their campsite. When Cassie and TJ successfully rescue Tommy from the Vortex of Eternal Doom and Sorrow, he goes to help the other Rangers defeat the Flamite monster. The Rangers are then required to defeat the Flamite monster and choose their successors before the hourglass is empty. Introducing: Selwyn Ward as T.J., Patricia Ja Lee as Cassie
20	"Stitch Witchery"	Blair Treu	Judd Lynn	September 12, 1997	504
As the new team of Rangers gets settled in, Divatox tricks Ashley into selling her design, which she casts a spell upon. Anyone who wears it becomes nasty and disrespectful. Things get worse when the Rangers and the Blue Senturion put the jackets on. Ashley has to get the jackets off her friends, and free the Blue Senturion by herself.
21	"The Wheel of Fate"	Blair Treu	Jackie Marchand	September 15, 1997	505
Divatox sets her eyes on the two legendary cars: Lightning Cruiser and Storm Blaster. Justin gets kidnapped with Storm Blaster, and T.J. must rescue him in Lightning Cruiser.
22	"Trouble by the Slice"	Yuri Alexander	Judd Lynn	September 16, 1997	506
Divatox loses her memory and ends up working in a pizza parlor. Porto creates Mad Mike from the parlor's picture to distract the Rangers so they can get Divatox back.
23	"The Phantom Phenomenon"	Blair Treu	Judd Lynn	September 17, 1997	507
Despite having over $10,000,000 worth of treasure, Divatox considers herself broke; she has Elgar attack the Angel Grove bank and the gold mines. However, a Phantom Ranger arrives on Earth to assist the Rangers in their fight against Divatox.
24	"Vanishing Act"	Yuri Alexander	John Fletcher	September 18, 1997	508
Deciding that the Rangers "can't protect what they can't see," Divatox sends the Translucitor to Angel Grove, where he begins turning everything invisible. Making matters worse, the Power Chamber has also fallen victim to Translucitor.
25	"When Time Freezes Over"	Yuri Alexander	Judd Lynn	September 19, 1997	509
When the Rangers stop Divatox from freezing the sun, she summons Clockster to rewind time so she can stop the Rangers from destroying the freeze key. Only this time, Clockster accidentally touches the freeze key and stops time.
26	"The Darkest Day"	Steve Markowitz	John Fletcher	September 22, 1997	510
General Havoc, Divatox's brother, arrives on Earth to help his sister defeat the Rangers. He uses his zord Metallasaurus to capture the Turbo Megazord.
27	"One Last Hope"	Steve Markowitz	Judd Lynn	September 23, 1997	511
Without the Turbo Megazord, the Rangers try to defend the city with everything they have left. The Phantom Ranger appears to deliver a new weapon to the Rangers; the Rescue Zords.
28	"The Fall of the Phantom"	Steve Markowitz	Judd Lynn	September 25, 1997	512
Divatox captures Cassie. For the Rangers to get her back, they must trade the Phantom Ranger. The Phantom Ranger's power ruby, the source of his energy, is stolen by Divatox.
29	"Clash of the Megazords"	Steve Markowitz	Brett Born	September 26, 1997	513
The Rangers are trying to bring down Divatox's space station, during which she sends the Turbo Megazord down to Earth to destroy them.
30	"The Robot Ranger"	Larry Litton	John Fletcher	October 3, 1997	514
Justin suspects his friends have been switched with robots. He sees wires in Ashley and TJ's wrists, and Carlos's face falls off. Divatox sends Flash Head and Voltmeister to Earth in different attacks on the Rangers. In the end, Justin is revealed to be a robot as well; the robots had been built on Eltar by Zordon and Alpha 5, then sent to Earth for testing. The Justin robot had its memory of being a robot deleted during testing so it could be used as a control subject.
31	"Beware the Third Wish"	Larry Litton	Judd Lynn	October 17, 1997	515
Divatox sends the Wicked Wisher to Earth, where he steals three coins from a wishing fountain. He uses these coins to grant Divatox 3 wishes. One for Elgar to have a full head of hair, one to turn the Blue Senturion evil, and the last coin (which belonged to Justin) goes missing on Earth. Divatox is left angry that Wicked Wisher can't enchant any more coins.
32	"The Gardener of Evil"	Larry Litton	Judd Lynn	October 20, 1997	516
Divatox sends the Wild Weeder to Earth to find the third coin, where Weeder turns humans into Diva Drones. Meanwhile, the Rangers are still trying to locate the coin to revert Blue Senturion to good. As luck would have it, Bulk and Skull have the coin, but it fries every machine they try putting it in.
33	"Fire in Your Tank"	Steve Markowitz	John Fletcher	October 30, 1997	517
Divatox sets her sights on the Lightning Cruiser. Elgar steals the Rangers booster fuel by accident, and Divatox makes a flying car instead.
34	"The Turn of the Wretched Wrench"	Steve Markowitz	John Fletcher	October 31, 1997	518
Ashley is having trouble in auto shop class. Divatox sends Maniac Mechanic to steal parts from Ashley's car when it breaks down. Divatox decides to build a monster car.
35	"Spirit of the Woods"	Steve Markowitz	Judd Lynn	November 3, 1997	519
TJ gets attacked by Lord Litter while jogging in the woods. When TJ cannot defeat the monster alone, a young boy, Erutan, comes to his rescue. Divatox then sets her sights on the young boy, wanting his powers over the elements for herself. TJ soon discovers Erutan's name is backwards for what he is...
36	"The Song of Confusion"	Blair Treu	John Fletcher	November 7, 1997	520
Cassie and her friend Vicky hold auditions for their band at the juice bar. Divatox decides to send some monsters to join the group and begins brainwashing people with her music.
37	"The Accident"	Blair Treu	John Fletcher	November 10, 1997	521
Divatox tries to make Carlos feel guilty when a player on his soccer team gets injured. Meanwhile, Elgar takes his not-yet-finished Megazord to Earth.
38	"Cassie's Best Friend"	Blair Treu	Judd Lynn	November 11, 1997	522
Mr. Goorific turns Cassie's dog, Jetson, into a person. Cassie thinks her dog has gone missing. Jetson, calling himself Jethro, helps Cassie look for himself while enjoying things he couldn't as a dog. Meanwhile, Elgar repairs his Megazord.
39	"The Curve Ball"	Lawrence L. Simeone	Judd Lynn	November 12, 1997	523
TJ is having trouble hitting curveballs in a game of baseball. When Divatox sends Strikeout to defeat the Rangers, TJ must find the secret to hitting curveballs to defeat the new monster.
40	"Carlos and the Count"	Lawrence L. Simeone	John Fletcher	November 13, 1997	524
Carlos and Justin watch a vampire horror movie. Per suggestion from Elgar (who is swatting annoying lunar bats), Divatox turns a lunar bat into Count Nocturne; she sends him to Earth, where he bits Carlos. The next day, Carlos is wearing black and sunglasses. Justin (as well as Bulk and Skull, who watched Carlos get bitten) suspects Carlos is a vampire. The other Rangers don't believe it until they see Carlos lacks a reflection; they track him to the blood drive at the Youth Center and take him back to the Power Chamber, where Alpha 6 uses an antidote to restore Carlos' sanity. However, Carlos cannot be fully cured until Count Nocturne is destroyed.
41	"Little Strong Man"	Liberty Goldman	Jackie Marchand	November 14, 1997	525
Justin decides to try out for the high school track team. When an ant bites him, he suddenly becomes 100 times stronger, but later finding out that it is at the cost of his morphing powers. When Divatox finds out, she sends the Pirahantrons to capture him.
42	"The Rival Rangers"	Judd Lynn	Judd Lynn	November 17, 1997	526
Ashley tries to go to a school dance with a boy Cassie likes. The boy ends up turning Ashley and Cassie against each other.
43	"Parts and Parcel"	Liberty Goldman	John Fletcher	November 18, 1997	527
Bulk and Skull are in danger of being thrown in jail because their new employer at a delivery company is blaming them for the recent theft of electronics. TJ offers his assistance to prove the goofballs' innocence, ultimately finding out that the thief is none-other than Divatox, who needed the parts to remote-control her three zords.
44	"Chase Into Space"	Judd Lynn	Judd Lynn	November 21, 1997	528
45	"Chase Into Space"	Judd Lynn	Judd Lynn	November 24, 1997	529
Divatox has summoned a powerful monster to Earth, Goldgoyle, which destroys both of the Megazords. Meanwhile, Dimitria and the Blue Senturion learn that Eltar has fallen to evil forces, and they leave to help Zordon. Divatox learns where the Power Chamber is at, and subsequently launches a successful attack that destroys the Power Chamber, causing the Rangers to be stripped of their powers. Dark Specter sends his messenger to tell Divatox he has captured Zordon. Divatox then leaves Earth for the Cimmerian Planet. With the Rangers powerless, they take one of NASADA's shuttles in order to go after Divatox and save Zordon, leaving Justin behind, as he chooses to stay with his father. The season ends on a cliffhanger, setting up the events of Power Rangers in Space.

== Comics ==
In 1997, Acclaim Comics published three one-shots based on Power Rangers Turbo. The first book was Power Rangers Turbo vs. Beetleborgs Metallix, featuring a crossover with the Saban-produced Beetleborgs. The other two were part of the Saban Powerhouse books called Power Rangers Turbo: Into The Fire & Other Stories and Power Rangers Turbo: Simple Simon Says & Other Stories.

In 2018, Boom! Studios published a back-up serial by Ryan Ferrier and Bachan in Mighty Morphin Power Rangers #25–36. It featured a team-up between the Blue Senturion and Ninjor.

== Home media ==
In 2012, Shout Factory announced that it had reached an exclusive distribution deal with Saban for shows such as Power Rangers and Big Bad Beetleborgs. Power Rangers Turbo was released on DVD in August 2012, as part of a Time-Life exclusive boxed set containing seasons 1–7. The show later became available independently of the boxed set in two volumes, the first volume consisting of first 23 episodes was released on April 1, 2014 and the second volume containing the remaining 22 episodes was released on June 3, 2014.
