= Jarred Blakiston =

New Zealand actor and writer (born 1991)

- Born: 24 July 1991 (age 34); Auckland, New Zealand

Jarred Blakiston (born 1991) is a New Zealand-born actor and writer.

== Background ==
He spent his childhood in Auckland and was educated at St Peter's College.

== Acting career ==
Blakiston is best known for his year-long role, from 2004 to 2005, and then recurring in 2007, in New Zealand's longest running soap, Shortland Street, playing the role of Daniel Potts, son of Dr Sarah Potts (Played by Amanda Billing). In 2007 he appeared in The Tattooist in the role of the young Jake Sawyer. He was formerly signed with Red11 modelling agency after being scouted at a popular Auckland CBD nightclub. He appeared in the film The Hobbit: An Unexpected Journey in the role of Musical Elf. Other film and television roles include "customer" in Power Ranges Megaforce, "Ethan Poindexter" in Amazing Extraordinary Friends, and "Laurence" in P.E.T Detectives. In 2015, he joined the cast of Power Rangers Dino Charge cast in the recurring role of Prince Phillip III of Zandar, who eventually becomes the Dino Charge Graphite Ranger.
