= Mighty Morphin Power Rangers the Album: A Rock Adventure =

Soundtrack album by Aaron Waters
- Released: December 1, 1994 (U.S.); December 13, 1994 (UK)
- Recorded: 1993–94 at Saban Studios
- Genre: Heavy metal
- Length: 39:47 (U.S.); 43:19 (UK)
- Label: Saban Records
- Producer: Ron Wasserman

International cover
- International cover

Mighty Morphin Power Rangers the Album: A Rock Adventure (released as Power Rangers the Album: A Rock Adventure in the UK) is a soundtrack compilation of several songs performed by Ron Wasserman, under the pseudonym of "Aaron Waters" (also sometimes credited as "The Mighty RAW"), from the first two seasons of Mighty Morphin Power Rangers. It was released on CD and cassette on December 1, 1994, in the US and December 13 in the UK.

== Album information ==
It was one of three Mighty Morphin Power Rangers audio products released in September 1994.

The album stood out amongst many other soundtracks at the time for its daring concept album style. All but four of the songs were loosely based around a linking story narrative, using audio samplings from Power Rangers episodes such as "Birds of a Feather" and "The Mutiny". This latter "adaptation" is at best almost spoiler-free - whilst they acknowledge the arrival of Lord Zedd and the brief departure of previous villain Rita Repulsa, there is no mention of the Thunderzords, and much of Pirantishead's threat and powers are cut out because they involve freezing and controlling the Dinozords, events that prohibit their participation in the climax to the album's story. The show's theme song "Go Go Power Rangers" has two versions: TV size (track 11) and long version (track 1).

To add to the narrative's garbled continuity, actor Jason David Frank's lines as Tommy Oliver, which dovetail into the track "Go Green Ranger Go", are all taken from "The Green Candle, Part II". The next track, "5-4-1", uses more dialogue from this episode, with Zordon sending the Rangers to help Tommy before his powers completely fail him.

Rita's argument with her minions from the conclusion of "Doomsday, Part II" is also used prior to the third track "Lord Zedd", in which Goldar's original line after "Never mind that!" was "Rita, get us out of here before Ultrazord blasts us!" However, on the album, the line is "Never mind that! Lord Zedd, the true Emperor, has returned."

The audio story concludes with Pirantishead meeting his fate at the hands of the original Ultrazord, a vast contrast to his demise in "The Mutiny, Part III", at the hands of the Thunder Megazord.

Because the album had been produced prior to the introduction of the White Ranger, new audio material was recorded by actors Bob Manahan and Richard Steven Horvitz (in their roles as Zordon and Alpha 5 respectively), to introduce the theme song for Tommy's second Ranger identity, "White Ranger Tiger Power", with Zordon proclaiming to the startled Alpha that the White Ranger was "the future you are seeing."

The UK release of the album featured a dance remix of "Power Rangers", produced by Simon Cowell, which also incorporated Manahan's exchange about the White Ranger. The track was released commercially as the album's main single, with a music video produced consisting of footage of the first season. It was distributed heavily in the UK, and once aired on Region Two BBC music show "Top of the Pops".

The album remains a vastly traded favorite amongst Power Rangers fans, and was eventually "followed-up" by further albums, but these forsook the concept album route and served as basic television and movie soundtracks.

Singles

Go, Go Power Rangers (TV version) was released August 28, 1993, as the show's theme song. Go, Go Power Rangers was released December 2, 1994, in the US and December 14 in the UK.

== Track listings ==
No.	Title	Writer(s)	Length
1.	"Go Go Power Rangers" (Long Version)	Shuki Levy; Kussa Mahchi	4:34
2.	"Fight"	Ron Wasserman; Ron Kenan; Levy; Mahchi	4:12
3.	"Lord Zedd"	Levy; Mahchi	2:38
4.	"Hey Rita"	Jeremy Sweet; Kenan; Levy; Mahchi	1:58
5.	"We Need a Hero"	Wasserman; Kenan; Levy; Mahchi	5:50
6.	"Combat"	Wasserman; Kenan; Levy; Mahchi	3:14
7.	"Go Green Ranger Go"	Wasserman; Kenan; Levy; Mahchi	3:18
8.	"5-4-1"	Wasserman; Kenan; Levy; Mahchi	2:29
9.	"Zords"	Levy; Mahchi	3:28
10.	"I Will Win"	Wasserman; Kenan; Levy; Mahchi	5:19
11.	"Go Go Power Rangers" (TV Version)	Levy; Mahchi	1:17
12.	"White Ranger Tiger Power"	Wasserman; Kenan; Levy; Mahchi	1:14
Total length:			39:47

UK Bonus Track
No.	Title	Writer(s)	Length
13.	"Power Rangers"	Levy; Mahchi	3:31
