= Ron Wasserman =

American singer-songwriter (born 1961)

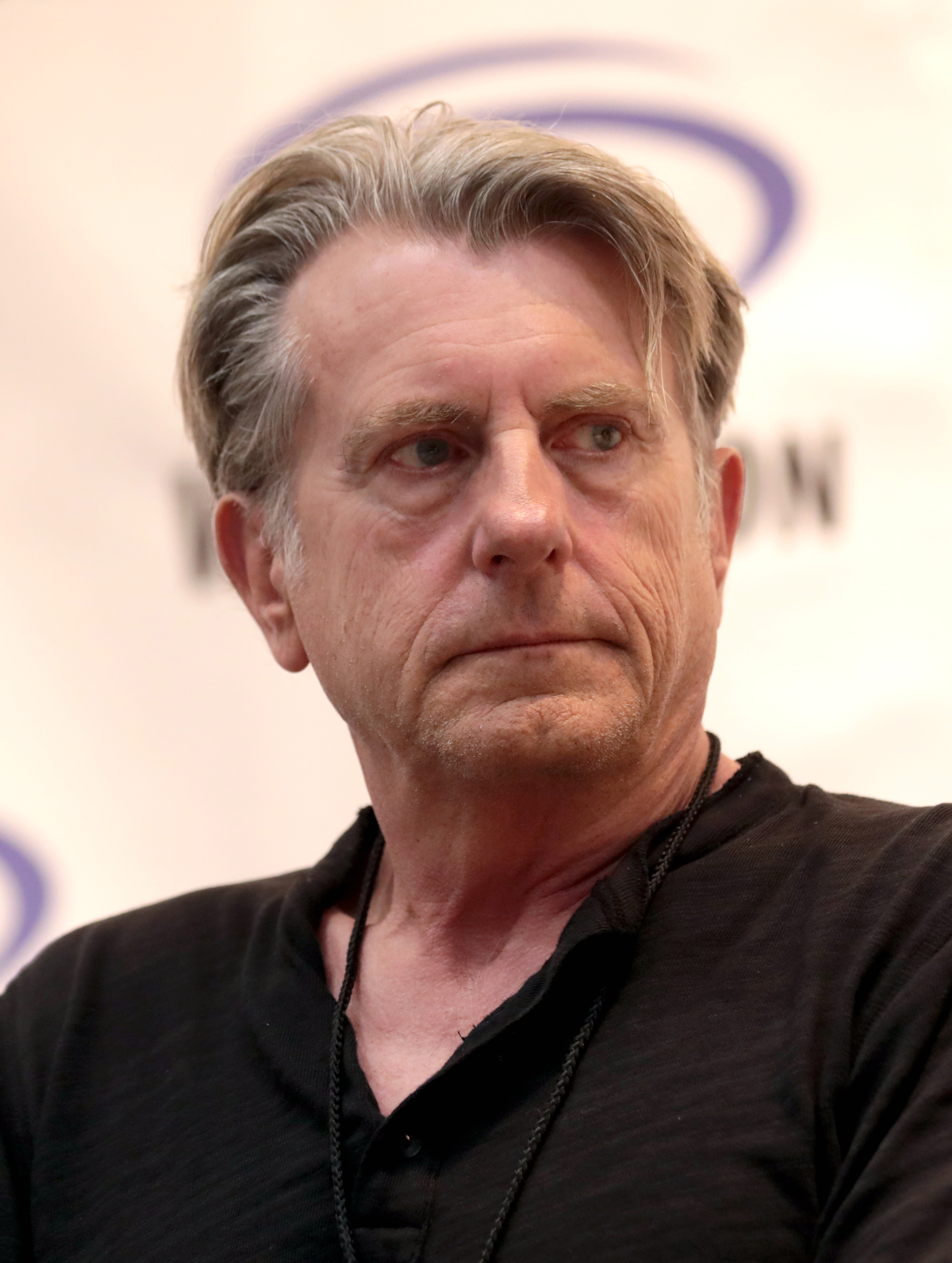
- Wasserman at the 2023 WonderCon

Background information
- Also known as: Aaron Waters; The Mighty Raw
- Born: Ronald Aaron Wasserman; September 2, 1961 (age 65); Encino, California, U.S.
- Genre: Heavy metal
- Occupations: Singer-songwriter, instrumentalist, record producer
- Instruments: Vocals, piano, keyboard, drums, percussion, clarinet
- Years active: 1979–present
- Labels: Rawfish, Saban Music Group
- Formerly of: Fisher
- Spouse: Kathleen Fisher (divorced)
- Website: ronw.com

Ronald Aaron Wasserman (born September 2, 1961), also known as Aaron Waters and The Mighty Raw, is an American musician who composed the original theme songs for Mighty Morphin Power Rangers and X-Men: The Animated Series. He was also a member of the band Fisher.

== History ==
=== Early career ===
Wasserman has been fascinated with music since he was three years old, when he started playing the piano. Bands that influenced him as a teenager include Black Sabbath, Genesis and Pink Floyd. Wasserman said, "my musical taste my entire life was so diverse, so I'd be listening to 'Rhapsody in Blue' by George Gershwin one day and learning to play it on the piano, and then I'd switch over to 'War Pigs' from Black Sabbath." His early music bands include Hollywood Headliners Betty Boop & the Beat, formed by SAG actress Lucrecia Sarita Russo. In 1983 (with Wasserman on keyboards), the group opened for Felony/Scotti Brothers records at the Florentine Gardens. Felony was fronted by Lucrecia's then-husband, Jeff Spry, who was receiving chart action with the KROQ-FM hit single "The Fanatic". In the mid-1980s, Ron started a rock band with present-day actress, E.G. Daily. In 1989, shortly after the band disbanded, he started working for Saban Entertainment. Wasserman filled in at Saban Entertainment one afternoon and eventually stayed there for six and a half years. Wasserman and Ron Kenan, once V.P. of Saban Entertainment/Music Production, met in the early 80's and played together in the popular new wave pop band, Betty Boop & the Beat.

=== Saban career and Mighty Morphin Power Rangers ===
During his early days at Saban, Wasserman worked as a music engineer, sometimes contributing background music and co-writing themes for several of their smaller series. Shows Wasserman worked on during this period include King Arthur and the Knights of Justice (which he composed the theme for), Little Shop, Saban's Around the World in Eighty Dreams, Saban's Gulliver's Travels and Video Power. Early on, he received creative notes from Saban that his music was too fast and heavy for children, and they would sometimes not accept the music he submitted because of this. Wasserman said, "you could hear probably throughout the whole office building when I drove in, blasting Black Sabbath, or Nirvana or some death metal out of my car. I had that energy and that angst back then. I got it out in my music." In 1992, Wasserman wrote the theme song for the animated Fox Kids X-Men series and co-composed background music for it, with this being the first hit show he worked on. Wasserman did not know anything about X-Men when he was asked to compose the theme. In a retrospective 2022 article, Wasserman remembered, "it was two weeks of hell putting that song together", adding that "I kept getting notes [saying] they wanted more bassline, then more high-hats. It was a real pain in the ass to do all that back then too. It came out really great though, the theme was really catchy and interesting and it was especially interesting when they animated to it." Wasserman also wrote some of the show's background music, with other composers from Saban also working on the background music. For the early episodes, the show's closing credits featured an instrumental heavy rock song from Wasserman, but for later episodes it was replaced by a shortened version of his opening theme.

The following year, he composed some of his most recognizable work, which was for the Fox Kids show Mighty Morphin Power Rangers. One day, he was presented with the first footage of the show, was told to use the word "Go", and to have it finished by the next day. The people from Saban Entertainment wanted him to use the word "Go" since Haim Saban had success using that lyric in the Inspector Gadget theme song, which was the first hit theme he and writing partner Shuki Levy were credited with. After two and a half hours, the song that resulted was the show's theme song, "Go Go Power Rangers". In 1991, he had previously composed an instrumental metal theme song for a similar Saban project called Metalman. The project never got off the ground, and Wasserman decided to give Mighty Morphin Power Rangers a rock/metal sound since it reminded him of Metalman. The song's guitar sounds were done almost entirely via a guitar patch on his synthesizer, with real guitars only being used sparsely on lead parts later in the song. Several years later, Wasserman met Van Halen member Eddie Van Halen, who wanted to learn how to play the song on guitar. Wasserman claims Van Halen was surprised to learn the song was mainly done through a synthesizer, since he had always assumed the song was recorded with a real guitar. In 2023, Wasserman also said he considered the song's sound to be speed metal rather than heavy metal or pop metal, and compared it to Metallica's Hardwired... to Self-Destruct. The song has sometimes been incorrectly attributed to the metal band Megadeth, due to similarities in the vocals and guitar sounds. In addition to composing the theme song for Mighty Morphin Power Rangers, Wasserman handled the background music, and in 1994 several of his most popular songs and scores from the series were released on a successful concept album entitled Mighty Morphin Power Rangers the Album: A Rock Adventure.

His compositions for X-Men: The Animated Series, Mighty Morphin Power Rangers and various other Saban productions were credited to Shuki Levy and Kussa Mahchi (an alias Haim Saban started using during the 1990s), with Wasserman only ever being listed in TV credits as a music producer or music engineer. This was allegedly so the pair could collect music royalties for Wasserman's work. According to Wasserman, he very rarely composed alongside Shuki Levy or Haim Saban on any Saban Entertainment shows. Saban's practice of not crediting musicians in order to gain royalties was revealed in a 1998 article by The Hollywood Reporter. Several past and present composers from Saban were interviewed, although Wasserman was the only one that was willing to be identified by name. Wasserman told The Hollywood Reporter, "they put their names on my work, and most of the time they had absolutely nothing to do with it, as far as creating the work was concerned. Most of the time, I would deliver the score, it would go to mix and air without the (credited) 'writers' seeing it or hearing it. That's how it works. It's really that simple." Regarding Mighty Morphin Power Rangers, Wasserman said, "for that, I got producer and/or engineer credit. No music by credit. No cue-sheet credit. The credit went to Haim Saban and Shuki Levy. As far as the theme, all Haim did was give it his approval. What Shuki did, I have no idea. I worked on the theme alone; they contributed nothing." He added that, "on the background music, they acted as producers and guided me extensively on the direction." In this article, a representative from Saban still maintained that the Mighty Morphin Power Rangers theme had been co-composed by Haim Saban, and that Wasserman was incorrect in saying that he was the sole composer. Wasserman and all other composers at Saban signed a contract agreeing to give up the rights to their compositions prior to joining the company. In the late 1990s, ten of these composers threatened to launch a multi-million dollar lawsuit against Haim Saban. Wasserman was not among these ten composers.

Another reason Saban did not credit musicians was so that they would be hidden enough as to not get offers to work for higher paying companies. Wasserman was originally going to do the music for the 1995 Power Rangers film, but Saban scrapped this plan at the last minute since it was a union film co-produced by 20th Century Fox, which would mean that Wasserman would have to be listed as the composer, and thus would be more well-known in the industry. Saban instead hired The Crow composer Graeme Revell, who, while credited on the film, didn't actually compose the score, instead secretly getting one of his assistants to do it. Wasserman was informed that he would not be doing the film's music via a representative from 20th Century Fox, and the only explanation given was because Haim Saban said so. The next time Wasserman ran into Haim Saban, he asked Saban why he wasn't doing the film's music, and Saban replied by telling him "you're no John Williams", with Wasserman's response to Saban being that he was "no Walt Disney". He eventually found out that he couldn't do the music because it was a union film and Fox discovered that Haim Saban was planning to credit himself for Wasserman's work. Not getting hired for the film upset Wasserman so much that he wrote a song about it shortly afterwards, called "Cross My Line". Regarding "Cross My Line", Wasserman said in 2013, "Haim and I always got along and I have nothing against him in the world. but that song was basically a 'fuck you, I'm out of here soon, and somewhere down the line you’re going to read all of the projects I’m involved in'".

For Mighty Morphin Power Rangers the Album: A Rock Adventure, the music was not credited to Shuki Levy and Kussa Mahchi, even though Levy and Saban are listed as writers or co-writers of the songs on legal cue sheets. Saban instead credited it to a fictitious artist named Aaron Waters. Wasserman came up with the name "Aaron Waters" because his middle name was Aaron and his surname Wasserman means "water carrier" in German. Saban later attached the additional alias "The Mighty RAW". While the reason behind it is unknown, it is assumed "RAW" is for his initials and "The Mighty" comes from the "Mighty Morphin Power Rangers." On Mighty Morphin Power Rangers the Album: A Rock Adventure, Waters is listed as the performer of the songs, while Wasserman is separately listed under his real name as the music producer and music engineer. Wasserman was also credited as Aaron Waters on the soundtrack album for the Power Rangers film, which used "Cross My Line" as a bonus track on some editions. "Cross My Line" also briefly appears within the film itself. In the film's credits, the performer of "Cross My Line" is listed as being The Mighty RAW, while Wasserman is separately listed under his real name as the writer of the song, alongside Shuki Levy and Kussa Mahchi. The original Power Rangers theme was also reworked by an orchestra for the film, and in the film's credits the writers of the theme are listed as Shuki Levy and Kussa Mahchi, with no mention of Wasserman just like in the TV show's credits.

Wasserman's X-Men theme would later be reworked by The Newton Brothers for X-Men '97 (2024). The series was a continuation of X-Men: The Animated Series, which originally ended in 1997. On the closing credits of X-Men '97, Shuki Levy and Haim Saban are still listed as the writers of the theme, with Saban being credited under his real name rather than the Kussa Mahchi alias.

=== Later Saban projects ===
His success with the Mighty Morphin Power Rangers soundtrack led to work on numerous other Saban productions in the mid-1990s. Projects from the studio he worked on following the release of Power Rangers include BattleTech: The Animated Series, Blindfold: Acts of Obsession, Creepy Crawlers, Jin Jin and the Panda Patrol, Space Strikers, Sweet Valley High, Teknoman and VR Troopers. He composed the theme songs for Sweet Valley High, Teknoman and VR Troopers, with the Sweet Valley High theme being sung by his future wife Kathy Fisher. Despite having a rock sound, he was never approached by Saban to do the theme for Spider-Man: The Animated Series (1994), which would end up being done by Joe Perry of Aerosmith. Wasserman was also not involved with the background music of Spider-Man: The Animated Series, which was credited to Shuki Levy and Kussa Mahchi. Wasserman left Saban in September 1995, since he was exhausted and was refused a pay rise. According to the Hollywood Reporter in 1998, Wasserman had contributed "hundreds of hours" worth of music to Saban by the time he left.

Shortly after leaving Saban, he got hired to do background music for Funimation's English dub of Dragon Ball Z, which during the first two seasons was co-handled by Saban and voice acting studio Ocean Productions. Saban's role in the dub was to distribute it to syndicated television (primarily Fox, WB and UPN affiliates) and to produce the soundtrack, with the company also demanding numerous censorship edits in order to get it on to American TV. It was Saban who hired Wasserman for Dragon Ball Z, and, according to Wasserman, they let him compose the music from his home as they didn't care about the show. Wasserman was allowed to give it a darker and heavier sound than previous shows he had worked on, since he would never receive creative notes when he sent the music to Saban. Regarding Dragon Ball Z, Wasserman remembered in 2017 that "I got to do whatever I wanted, so I went with this really heavy, weird stuff". Wasserman recorded the Dragon Ball Z score in the living room of his Los Angeles apartment, via multiple keyboard synthesizers and a Mac computer, which was running in Performer mode for the MIDI sequencer. Synthesizer gear he used included a Proteus 1 and Proteus 2, and a Kurzweil K2500R. To synchronize his music with the animation, he utilized raw VHS tapes of Dragon Ball Z's dub prepared with dual audio tracks. One track provided a mono mix of dialogue and sound effects, while the other had an SMPTE timecode, an audio signal that functioned as a digital clock to lock his Mac's MIDI sequencer to the video's playback. By locking the two devices together, the MIDI software would automatically chase the tape, jumping to the correct musical cue whenever Wasserman played, rewound, or fast-forwarded the VHS. This ensured frame-accurate precision for the musical scoring, despite the video being played from an external analog source. Wasserman scored while the VHS played on his living room's 27-inch tube television. Wasserman noted that while the timecode track was dedicated to data, he could still faintly hear the show's dialogue bleeding through that channel as he worked. He would deliver his final mixes for episodes to Saban on Digital Audio Tape (DAT). Since Wasserman was no longer employed by Saban at this point, they paid him on an episode by episode basis to score Dragon Ball Z. Prior to hiring Wasserman on Dragon Ball Z, Saban had already created their own theme song for the show called "Rock the Dragon", which had composer Jeremy Sweet on vocals. At that time, Sweet was also doing music for Power Rangers Zeo (1996), which was the first Power Rangers season to have been made after Wasserman left Saban in late 1995.

Between 1996 and 1998, Wasserman composed for the first two seasons of Dragon Ball Z, as well as the dub of the third movie The Tree of Might. The original 1997 English dub of this movie edited it into a three part episode of the television series, with the episodes appearing as part of the second season. The music was recycled from the dub of the first two seasons, instead of being created specifically for it. On December 9, 1997, "Rock the Dragon" and music from the dub's background score were released on an album titled Dragon Ball Z: Original USA Television Soundtrack. The album's music was attributed to Shuki Levy and Kussa Mahchi, with these two also being listed as the composers on the dub's closing credits. Wasserman was only listed as a music producer on the dub's closing credits, alongside Jeremy Sweet, and wasn't mentioned at all on the soundtrack album release. In 1999, Wasserman was replaced for the third season and beyond by Dallas-based composer Bruce Faulconer. Like Levy and Haim Saban, Faulconer also allegedly did not write many of the compositions he was credited for, instead getting a small group of musicians to do it for him. Faulconer was based in the same city as Funimation, which meant that they would have more creative control over the soundtrack by using him instead, with the company also deciding to use local actors for the third season rather than the Vancouver-based Ocean Productions. Wasserman said he had been interested in composing for the third season of Dragon Ball Z, which was the first done without Saban's involvement. He was under the impression that the first two dub seasons were solely produced by Saban Entertainment, and was unaware of who Funimation was while he was working on the show. He thought Saban had lost the rights for Dragon Ball Z to another company, and eventually found out Funimation were the ones doing the dub of the third season. He reached out to them, however, they did not like the music from the first two seasons, and told him they were changing the sound. Funimation's president Gen Fukunaga said in a 1999 interview that "we had to change the 'composer'. We were not very pleased with the music for the first two seasons. We're much happier with this new composer, we just feel that the newer music is much better." He added, "we wanted to have more control over the music. Previously, we had almost no control. Saban wouldn't deliver the music on time, and we couldn't have it adjusted the way we wanted. Now, with it being done locally, we've been given a lot more control."

Wasserman subsequently said that he wasn't even aware that the Dragon Ball franchise had a large following until the early 2010s, when a fan emailed him about the show. Prior to the 2010s, he believed that the show had simply faded into obscurity once he was done working on it. Wasserman has also said that he didn't know how popular X-Men: The Animated Series was until around that time. The master tapes for his music on shows such as Dragon Ball Z, Sweet Valley High and X-Men: The Animated Series are believed to be permanently lost, since they got misplaced when Disney purchased Saban in 2001.

In 1998, Wasserman performed the Power Rangers in Space theme and music. This was the last Power Rangers season he was involved with before Saban got sold to Disney in 2001. He had still been contributing a few pieces of music to the franchise during the Power Rangers Zeo and Power Rangers Turbo seasons, which occurred during 1996 and 1997, after he had already left Saban. He also contributed music to Turbo: A Power Rangers Movie, the 1997 movie sequel to Power Rangers Zeo and prequel to Power Rangers Turbo.

=== Post-Saban music career ===
After leaving Saban, Wasserman started a band with then-girlfriend Kathy Fisher. Wasserman also began working on various video game titles with Pink Floyd producer, Bob Ezrin and contributed to DIC Entertainment. The first show he composed for which had no connection to Saban was DIC Entertainment's Mummies Alive!, which aired for 42 episodes during 1997. It was produced by Eric and Julia Lewald, who had previously worked on X-Men: The Animated Series. In 1998, Fisher contributed the song "Breakable" for the 20th Century Fox movie Great Expectations. The popularity of this song and others on file sharing site MP3.com helped them briefly get signed to Interscope Records at the turn of the millennium. The unorthodox way they got signed to a major record label attracted attention from various media outlets, including Time magazine in 2000.

=== Return to Power Rangers ===
Wasserman returned to solo work in 2005, and even returned to the Power Rangers franchise that same year, composing the theme song for the thirteenth Power Rangers season, Power Rangers S.P.D.. News of his involvement reached the fanbase and demo versions of the theme were leaked, upsetting Disney executives. According to content creator Linkara in his web series "History of Power Rangers", Wasserman also submitted demos for the fourteenth season, Power Rangers Mystic Force. He had first submitted the rock theme and though the producers at Disney approved, he would later be told they were seeking something more rap-oriented; thus, leading him to create and submit a rap theme which they also rejected. Since Disney were not going to be using the themes for the series he posted the demos online for the fans.

=== Post Power Rangers ===
Wasserman remains active with other television and commercial projects, including work for America's Next Top Model.

In 2010, Wasserman released two original songs with Ozone Entertainment as downloadable content on the Rock Band Network.

=== Power Rangers: Redux ===
Power Rangers Redux

Studio album by Ron Wasserman
- Released: October 22, 2012
- Genre: Soundtrack
- Length: 85:49

On August 28, 2012, Wasserman announced on both RangerBoard and RangerCrew that he would be re-cutting the original Power Rangers songs, to refresh their sound and use new technology to record them. During the process of recording the tracks, Wasserman posted a few unedited/unmixed sample clips.

Despite being limited to songs that were commercially released on CD or cassette during the 90s, a large repertoire of his Power Rangers music still remained to create the new album. The tracks were released via Bandcamp on October 22, 2012, with CD Baby (covering Amazon, iTunes, etc.) coming thereafter. This new album includes an instrumental version of each song, making it the largest instrumental release of Power Rangers music thus far. A listing of the tracks is as follows:

Power Rangers: Redux
No.	Title	Writer(s)	Artist(s)	Length
1.	"Go Go Power Rangers - Redux"	Ron Wasserman	Ron Wasserman	3:58
2.	"Fight - Redux"	Ron Wasserman	Ron Wasserman	3:58
3.	"Hope For the World - Redux"	Ron Wasserman	Ron Wasserman	4:36
4.	"Combat - Redux"	Ron Wasserman	Ron Wasserman	4:59
5.	"Cross My Line - Redux"	Ron Wasserman	Ron Wasserman	3:14
6.	"Lord Zedd - Redux"	Ron Wasserman	Ron Wasserman	2:40
7.	"We Need A Hero - Redux"	Ron Wasserman	Ron Wasserman	5:36
8.	"Go Green Ranger Go - Redux"	Ron Wasserman	Ron Wasserman	3:02
9.	"Unite - Redux"	Ron Wasserman	Ron Wasserman	4:14
10.	"5-4-1 - Redux"	Ron Wasserman	Ron Wasserman	2:24
11.	"I Will Win - Redux"	Ron Wasserman	Ron Wasserman	5:34
12.	"Go Go Power Rangers - Instrumental Redux"	Ron Wasserman		3:58
13.	"Fight - Instrumental Redux"	Ron Wasserman		3:56
14.	"Hope For the World - Instrumental Redux"	Ron Wasserman		4:36
15.	"Combat -Instrumental Redux"	Ron Wasserman		4:58
16.	"Cross My Line - Instrumental Redux"	Ron Wasserman		3:15
17.	"We Need A Hero - Instrumental Redux"	Ron Wasserman		5:35
18.	"Go Green Ranger Go - Instrumental Redux"	Ron Wasserman		3:03
19.	"Unite - Instrumental Redux"	Ron Wasserman		4:14
20.	"5-4-1 - Instrumental Redux"	Ron Wasserman		2:24
21.	"I Will Win - Instrumental Redux"	Ron Wasserman		5:25
Total length:				85:49

== Personal life ==
At an early age, Wasserman was adopted by parents of Russian-Jewish descent. His sister was also adopted. As a child, he was often mistaken as being from a different family, since he had blonde hair, while his parents and sister had red hair.

He was formerly married to Kathleen Fisher (the namesake and Wasserman's bandmate in Fisher). They had one son together, born in 2004.

In September 2018, Wasserman was involved in a mountain bike accident, requiring surgery afterwards.

== Discography ==
=== Studio albums ===
- Mighty Morphin Power Rangers the Album: A Rock Adventure (1994) (as Aaron Waters)
- Power Rangers Redux (2012)

=== Singles ===
- "Go Go Power Rangers" (1994)
- "American Hero" (2010)
- "Fight Back" (2010)

== TV/film composing credits ==
- X-Men: The Animated Series (1992–1995) – Co-composer of the theme song and background music
- Mighty Morphin Power Rangers (1993–1996) – Singer, composer and songwriter of the theme song and background music
- VR Troopers (1994–1996) – Co-singer and composer/songwriter of the background music
- Sweet Valley High (1994–1998) – Composer and songwriter of the theme song and background songs
- Space Strikers (1995) – Co-composer of the background music
- Teknoman (1995) – Composer of theme song and co-composer of the background music
- Power Rangers Zeo (1996) – Co-singer, co-composer and co-songwriter
- Dragon Ball Z (1996–1998) – Composer of the background music for the original English dub version of the first 53 episodes
- Ace Ventura: The CD-Rom Game (1996) [Video Game]
- Monty Python & the Quest for the Holy Grail (1996) [Video Game]
- Power Rangers Turbo (1997) – Co-singer, co-composer and co-songwriter of the background music
- Taylor's Return (1997)
- Dragon Ball Z: The Tree of Might (1997) – Composer of the background music for the original English dub version of the film
- Mummies Alive! (1997–1998) – Singer-songwriter of the title song and co-writer of the background music
- Power Rangers in Space (1998) – Singer, co-composer and co-songwriter of the theme song and background music
- Great Expectations (1998) – Music written and performed by
- America's Next Top Model (2003–2013) – Co-composer of the background music
- Trollz (2005–2006) – Composer and songwriter
- Power Rangers SPD (2005) – Singer, composer and songwriter of the song title
- Dance Revolution (2006–2007) – Co-composer of the background music
- Horseland (2006–2008)
- DinoSquad (2007–2008)
- Sushi Pack (2008–2009)
- SpongeBob SquarePants (2008) – Composer of the background music
- Basketball Wives (2010–2013) – Co-composer of the background music
- Hot in Cleveland (2010–2015) – Composer of theme and background music
- The Real Housewives of New York City (2011–present)
- All-American Muslim (2011)
- America's Supernanny (2011)
- Retired at 35 (2011) – Co-composer of the background music
- 7 Days of Sex (2012) – Co-composer of the background music
- The Soul Man (2012–2016) – Composer of the background music and theme
- Who Do You Think You Are? (2013–2022) – Co-composer of the background music
- Kirstie (2013–2014) – Composer of the background music and theme
- The Thundermans (2013–2018) – Composer of the background music
- Bella and the Bulldogs (2015–2016) – Composer of the background music
- Criminal Confessions (2017–2020) – Theme composer and co-composer of score
- The Nothing (2018–present) – Composer [video game]
- Murder for Hire (2019–present) – Theme composer and co-composer of score
- Mighty Morphin Power Rangers: Once & Always (2023) – Theme composer and composer of score
- The Thundermans: Undercover (2025–present) – Composer of the background music

== Miscellaneous ==
- Doctor Strange in the Multiverse of Madness (2022) – An orchestrated rendition of Wasserman's X-Men: The Animated Series theme briefly appeared.
- Ms. Marvel (2022) – A brief rendition of Wasserman's X-Men: The Animated Series theme briefly appeared in the episode "No Normal".
- The Thundermans Return (2024) – Wasserman's The Thundermans theme is used, composed by Caleb Chan and Brian Chan.
- X-Men '97 (2024–present) – Wasserman's X-Men: The Animated Series theme is used, composed by The Newton Brothers.
- What If...? (2024) – A brief rendition of Wasserman's X-Men: The Animated Series theme briefly appeared in the episode "What If... What If?".
- Clash of the Thundermans (2026) – Wasserman's The Thundermans theme is used, composed by Frederik Wiedmann.
