= Robert L. Manahan =

American actor (1956–2000)

- Born: Robert Lawrence Manahan; August 23, 1956; Palo Alto, California, U.S.
- Died: June 30, 2000 (aged 43); Alameda County, California, U.S.
- Occupation: Actor
- Years active: 1977–2000

Robert Lawrence Manahan (August 23, 1956 – June 30, 2000) was an American actor and member of the Sound Department of Hollywood film industry. He was most recognized for being the voice of Zordon in the later two and a half seasons of Mighty Morphin Power Rangers, Power Rangers Zeo, several episodes of Power Rangers Turbo and Power Rangers in Space. He had also done voice-over projects for other TV shows.

In honor of his death (due to an aneurysm of the heart), episode 21 "The Fifth Crystal" of Power Rangers Lightspeed Rescue was dedicated in his memory.

== Partial filmography ==
=== Actor ===
- You Light Up My Life (1977) as Ass't Engineer
- Mighty Morphin Power Rangers: The Movie (1995) as Zordon (voice)
- Mighty Morphin Power Rangers (1993-1995, TV Series) as Zordon (voice)
- Power Rangers Zeo (1996, TV Series) as Zordon / Zordonicus (voice)
- Turbo: A Power Rangers Movie (1997) as Zordon (voice)
- Power Rangers Turbo (1997, TV Series) as Zordon (voice)
- Power Rangers in Space (1998, TV Series) as Zordon (voice) (final appearance)

=== Sound department ===
- Jimmy Buffett: Live by the Bay (audio sweetening) (1986)
- The Return of Bruno (TV Movie) (post production audio) (1987)
- CBS Summer Playhouse (TV Series) (sound mixer - 1 episode) (1987)
- D.C. Follies (TV Series) (post-production audio - 1 episode) (1987)
- Funny, You Don't Look 200: A Constitutional Vaudeville (TV Movie documentary) (audio effects editor) (1987)
- Genesis: The Invisible Touch Tour (Documentary short) (audio sweetening) (1987)
- Caddie Woodlawn (post production sound mixer) (1987)
- Duet (TV series) (post production audio - 5 episodes) (post production audio - 5 episodes) (1987–88)
- The Making of 'The Little Mermaid' (TV Movie documentary) (post audio) (1989)
- McGee and Me! (TV Series) (post-production audio - 7 episodes) (1989-1990)
- American Dreamer (TV Series) (re-recording mixer) (1990)
- Red Hot and Blue (TV Movie) (audio) (1990)
- Crosby, Stills & Nash: Long Time Comin' (Video documentary) (audio) (1990)
- Goofy's Guide to Success (TV Movie) (post audio) (1990)
- Howling VI: The Freaks (re-recording mixer and sound editor) (1991)
- Supermarket Sweep (TV series) (re-recording mixer - 1 episode) (1991)
- Not of This World (re-recording mixer) (1991)
- Lifestyles of the Rich and Animated (TV Movie) (re-recording mixer and sound effects) (1991)
- Baby Talk (TV series) (re-recording mixer - 2 episodes) (1991)
- The Ride (re-recording mixer) (1991)
- Beakman's World (re-recording mixer - 78 episodes) (1991–97)
- Jack Benny: Comedy in Bloom (TV Movie documentary) (post-production sound mixer) (1992)
- Paramount Pictures Promotional Sampler Laserdisc (Video documentary) (audio mixer) (1992)
- Martin (TV series) (re-recording mixer (16 episodes) and post production sound (2 episodes)) (1992 - 1993)
- Doppelganger (digital sound effects) (1993)
- Mighty Morphin Power Rangers (re-recording mixer - 112 episodes) (1993-1995)
- Sweet Valley High (TV series) (re-recording mixer - 6 episodes) (1994–95)
- Hudson Street (TV series) (re-recording mixer - 1 episode) (1995)
- Malcolm & Eddie (TV series) (re-recording - 11 episodes) (1996 - 1997)
- King of the Hill (re-recording mixer - 1 episode) (1997)
- The Tony Danza Show (TV Series) (re-recording - 14 episodes) (1997-1998)
- The Net (American TV series) (re-recording mixer - 1 episode) (1999)
- V.I.P. (TV series) (1999) (re-recording mixer - 1 episode)
- L.A. Heat (TV series) (1999) (supervising sound editor - 12 episodes)
- Dilbert (TV series) (1999-2000) (re-recording mixer - 17 episodes)
- Falcone (TV series) (re-recording mixer) (2000)
- The Linda McCartney Story (TV Movie) (re-recording mixer) (2000)
- The King of Queens (re-recording mixer - 3 episodes) (2000)
- Family Law (re-recording mixer) (2000)
- James Brown: Live from the House of Blues (Video documentary) (sound) (2000)

== Awards and nominations ==
Awards and nominations
| Year | Award giving body | Category | Nominated work/ Person | Results |
|---|---|---|---|---|
| 1998 | 25th Daytime Emmy Awards | Outstanding Sound Mixing | Beakman's World | Included |
| 1995 | 22nd Daytime Emmy Awards | Live and tape sound mixing and sound effects | Beakman's World | Won |
| 1994 | 21st Daytime Emmy Awards | Live and tape sound mixing and sound effects | Beakman's World | Included |
