= Saban Brands =

American brand management and production company

- Type: In-name only unit of Hasbro Entertainment, operating as SCG Power Rangers, LLC.
- Industry: Television production; Brand management
- Predecessors: Saban Entertainment (later BVS Entertainment; 4Kids Entertainment (Cubix: Robots for Everyone and Sonic X)
- Founded: May 12, 2010; 16 years ago
- Founder: Haim Saban
- Defunct: July 2, 2018; 8 years ago
- Fate: Closed: Majority of assets sold off to Hasbro; Folded into Saban Capital Group; Some assets were spun-off to different companies, including Digimon and PreCure revoked to Toei Animation Inc. and Rainbow Butterfly Unicorn Kitty bought out by Funrise Toys
- Successors: Hasbro Entertainment (Power Rangers and most of its assets); Toei Animation Inc. (Digimon Fusion); Saban Capital Group
- Headquarters: Los Angeles, California, U.S.
- Area served: Worldwide
- Number of employees: 9
- Parent: Saban Capital Group
- Divisions: Saban Brands Lifestyle Group; Saban Brands Entertainment Group
- Website: Official website (archived)

Saban Brands was an American brand management and production company and a defunct subsidiary of Saban Capital Group based in Los Angeles, California. Founded by Israeli American media mogul Haim Saban as a successor to an earlier company he co-founded, Saban Entertainment (later BVS Entertainment), it was active from 12 May 2010 to 2 July 2018.

== History ==
=== Foundation and expansion ===
On 5 May 2010, Saban Capital Group announced a formation of Saban Brands, a successor company to BVS Entertainment, previously known as Saban Entertainment, that is "dedicated to acquiring entertainment and consumer brands" with a starting investment of $500 million and Elie Dekel, a former licensing and merchandising executive of 20th Century Studios (formerly known as 20th Century Fox). On 12 May 2010, Saban Brands bought back the Power Rangers franchise including some related shows from the Walt Disney Company for $43 million and produced a 19th season of the Power Rangers series that began airing on Nickelodeon on 7 February 2011, with the previous 700 episodes being rerun on Nicktoons. It was also announced that Saban Brands is in negotiations to buy three other brands. On 17 August 2010, Saban Brands bought Paul Frank Industries, owners of the Julius Monkey brand.

On 1 May 2012, Kidsco Media Ventures LLC, an affiliate of parent company Saban Capital Group, placed a bid to acquire some of the assets of bankrupt production and syndication company, 4Kids Entertainment, including the US rights to the Yu-Gi-Oh! franchise and The CW4Kids block, for $10 million. 4K Acquisition Corp, a subsidiary of Japanese entertainment media conglomerate Konami, then placed a bid. On 5 June that same year, 4Kids commenced an auction between Kidsco and 4K Acquisition which was then adjourned so 4Kids, Kidsco and 4K Acquisition could consider an alternative transaction.

On 15 June 2012, 4Kids filed a notice outlining a proposed deal in which its assets would be divided between Kidsco and 4K Acquisition which was finalized on 26 June. The deal saw 4K Acquisition acquire the US rights to the Yu-Gi-Oh! franchise and Kidsco acquire other 4Kids assets including the US broadcasting agreements for Dragon Ball Z Kai, Cubix: Robots for Everyone, Sonic X and The CW4Kids Saturday morning programming block.

On 2 July 2012, Saban Brands, via its Kidsco Media Ventures division, would begin a programming block for The CW to replace Toonzai in the autumn/fall, to be named Vortexx on 12 July and would ran from 25 August that year to 27 September 2014.

On 12 June 2012, Saban Brands reintroduced the Popples franchise with upcoming merchandise to be released the following year in the autumn/fall. On 3 August the same year, it was announced that Saban Brands acquired The Playforge, the development team behind App Store success stories Zombie Farm and Zombie Life. On 19 September 2012, Saban Brands acquired Zui, provider of online children's content. On 25 September 2012, Saban Brands announced that they re-acquired the Digimon franchise and its most recent season, Digimon Fusion with licensing and distribution duties retained by Toei Animation for Asian and MarVista Entertainment for all other territories.

On 3 July 2013, Saban Brands signed a deal to manage the distribution, licensing and merchandising of Sendokai Champions in North America and Israel and be broadcast on Vortexx. On 25 October 2013, Saban Brands shut down The Playforge because of poor game sales. That same year, the company launched Julius Jr., an animated preschool series based on the Paul Frank brand, which premiered on Nick Jr. on 29 Septemper, 2013.

Saban Brands and Lionsgate Films announced on 7 May 2014 that they were planning to produce a new Power Rangers feature film, and would hopefully launch a Power Rangers film franchise. Saban Brands sold KidZui to LeapFrog Enterprises on 4 August the same year. With the acquisition of Macbeth Footwear, Saban Brands formed two divisions Saban Brands Lifestyle Group and Saban Brands Entertainment Group to expand their holdings. On 6 January 2014, Saban Brands Lifestyle Group acquired Mambo Graphics. On 24 March 2015, Saban Brands Lifestyle Group had acquired Piping Hot. Saban Brands developed animated series based on its first two properties, Kibaoh Klashers (铁甲威虫; Armoured Beetles) that was edited from 52 episodes to 30 episodes and Treehouse Detectives, which were picked up by Netflix on 6 October 2016.

=== Library sale and closure ===
On 15 February 2018, Saban Brands appointed Hasbro as the global master toy licensee for Power Rangers with a future option to purchase the franchise. On 1 May 2018, Saban agreed to sell Power Rangers and other entertainment assets to Hasbro for US$522 million in cash and stock, with the sale expected to close in that year's second quarter. Other properties in the deal included My Pet Monster, Popples, Julius Jr., Luna Petunia, Treehouse Detectives and content/media libraries owned by Saban Brands (excluding Rainbow Butterfly Unicorn Kitty and other properties that were sold to different companies before the deal). Saban's Digimon and Pretty Cure licenses were also transferred to Hasbro, but thus reverting to Toei Animation Inc. and Toei Animation Europe for its international distribution due to the confusion of Hasbro's already co-owned Beyblade with Takara Tomy. Only nine existing employees out of sixty would be retained by SCG, and the Saban Brands subsidiary ended operations upon the closure of business on 2 July 2018.

== Libraries ==
- Digimon (currently by Discotek Media and Toei Animation Inc.)
- Rainbow Butterfly Unicorn Kitty (currently by Funrise and Cake Entertainment)
- Sonic X (currently by Discotek Media and TMS Entertainment)

The following properties are now owned by Hasbro, via Hasbro Entertainment:

- Cubix
- Glitter Force (co-ownership with Toei Animation Inc.)
- Julius Jr.
- Kibaoh Klashers
- Luna Petunia
- My Pet Monster (purchased from American Greetings/TCFC, Inc.)
- Ninja Turtles: The Next Mutation (co-ownership with Paramount Global)
- Popples (purchased from American Greetings/TCFC, Inc.)
- Power Rangers (co-ownership with Toei Company)
- Treehouse Detectives
