= Idol: The Musical =

Musical based on the TV show American Idol

Idol: The Musical is an American off-Broadway musical based on the popular TV show American Idol. The story is about a group of "dork-like" characters who dream of winning a spot as the opening act in Clay Aiken's new tour. The music was written by Jon Balcourt, lyrics co-written by Balcourt and Todd Ellis, and directed by Dan Tursi. The original story was conceived and outlined, including plot, songs, and characters, by Ellis.

The show began previews at the 45th Street Theatre on July 5, 2007. The show closed on its official opening night of August 12, 2007, due to poor ticket sales and bad word of mouth.

== Synopsis ==
The lights fade up on a silhouetted statue. Robed members enter slowly, as if in a procession, and begin to circle the statue. When the cloth is stripped away the audience realizes this is a fan club for Clay Aiken! ("Opening: Idolize"). Emily, the leader of the group, takes the members through the meeting's traditional schedule and agenda ("The Meeting"). Different members of the group are slowly introduced: JD, a jock who wants to get out of the small town, Connor, a nerdy pianist who seems to have trouble fitting in, Cicada, the human dictionary who gets in everyone's way, Kodi, the theatrical ham who never ceases to make an entrance, Cass, the gothic masochist who spends more time poking pins into her doll than paying attention at the meeting, Alex, the tough tomboy who constantly tries to avoid Duncan, and Duncan, the goofy "cowboy" who is constantly seeking Alex's attention.

As the meeting progresses the members share their discontent with living in a small town, and reflect on life outside ("Small Town Blues"). An unexpected guest appears as the meeting continues. Adrienne, Emily's sister, has returned from her unsuccessful audition for American Idol and tries to appear as a big star-to-be that has the know-how to whip the hapless group into shape in time for a competition coming to town: to be the opening act for Clay Aiken's new tour ("15 Minutes"). The group decides to create a song and dance number that will impress Clay, but it cannot be completed with the discipline and focused required in all rehearsals ("Discipline").

JD is practicing basketball after the meeting, and happens upon a pole in the garage that the club uses to gather. Slowly he morphs from a basketball playing hip-hop dancer to a pole-dancing male stripper wannabe. Kodi, Cicada and Emily enter and catch him in the act, almost speechless, but laughing it off, nonetheless. Shortly after, Alex and Duncan enter in a fight once again, as always, with Duncan pleading for Alex to give him a chance and let him take her out on a date. JD admits to the group that he did not get the basketball scholarship he claimed, and instead has different plans for his future ("Chip'n'Dale Days").

Connor is home working on the music to the song he is writing for the group to perform. While at home, Cass enters behind him unannounced and catches him at the piano with his pants down (a way of relaxing while practicing, he claims). The tension between the two is evident and it is clear that there are shared feelings from both sides. However, neither is strong or brave enough to take a step towards admitting it. When the two are about to kiss, Adrienne interrupts and Cass leaves to go to rehearsal. Adrienne gives Connor some new music she says she written as a backup to the act they are already working on, and demands he play it for her to practice ("Prima Donna, Fabulous"). Connor is stunned and realizes that Adrienne is planning the act to sabotage the group's chances of winning so that she can steal the spotlight. She laughs and tells him it is too late and the others will think he was in on it with her. She leaves for un rehearsal and Connor is left wondering what to do.

At rehearsal, the group practices the mundane, cheesy number for the last time ("Quakin' for Aiken"). Adrienne and Connor enter during the rehearsal and the group soon realizes what has been going on, and blames Connor for double-crossing them. They leave one by one, and it seems like the group of friends has fallen apart. Adrienne leaves Connor to himself, enjoying her success as she exits the garage ("Prima Donna, Fabulous (reprise)"). Emily is passing her time working on a clay bust of Clay's head, and begins to believe that it takes on all too real a likeness to her idol ("Burnin' Hunk of Clay"). When Alex, JD, Kodi and Cicada return to the garage in hopes of remaining friends, they share their disbelief that Connor could do something like this to them. They all take turns bashing Idol's most popular judge, Simon Cowell, and ultimately tell him in their minds that he does not matter and neither do his harsh statements ("Simon Says").

Meanwhile, Cass (who took Connor's "betrayal" the hardest of all), is sitting alone with her doll, while Connor is at home drowning his sorrow and lamenting the loss of the one girl he ever loved ("Distance").

Graduation day has arrived, and Emily throws away her clay bust, deciding she is better off without a crazy obsession. Kodi enters, with less than a flair, and Cicada enters with him, slightly softer in tone and appearance than usual. One by one the group is reforming, as Duncan and JD return as a jock and stripper, respectively. Included in this rebirth of the group is Alex, who has cleaned the grease off her clothes and cleaned up her hair. Cass enters and amazes all with her gentle girl-next-door appearance. She has removed the dark makeup and black clothes and returned to the way she was before she decided to be monochromatic. Last to return is Connor, who has become a suave, smooth talker in hopes of winning Cass and his friends back ("Family of Misfits"). The group has now made amends, but Adrienne returns having won the competition. She reveals that the contest was a joke and that the prize was simply to sing in a commercial for Clay's new brand of chicken. Disappointed, Adrienne apologizes to her old friends, and the group gets ready to graduate. As they go off into the world they are now ready to face whatever life has in store for them, knowing they will always have each other, and that being who they really are is more important than putting up a facade ("Finale: Realize") ("15 Minutes (reprise)").

== Casts ==
Off-Broadway

Character	Original (2007)	Replacement (2007)
Adrienne	Babs Rubenstein	Katy Reinsel
Alex	Jennie Riverso	Jillian Giacchi
Cass	Nikita Richards	Kierstyn Sharrow
Cicaida	Courtney Ellis	Kaitlin Mercurio
Connor	Jon Balcourt	Philip Deyesso
Duncan	Ryan Sprague	Saum Eskandani
Emily	Joella Burt	Stephanie Robinson
J.D.	Joe Walker	Joe Walker
Kodi	Roy George-Thiemann	Shadae Smith
Midge	—	Dawn Barry

== Songs ==
- "Opening: Idolize" - company
- "The Meeting" - Emily, company
- "Small Town Blues" - company
- "15 Minutes" - company
- "Discipline" - Adrienne, company
- "Chip'n'Dale Days" - JD, Duncan
- "Prima Donna, Fabulous" - Adrienne
- "Quakin' for Aiken" - Emily, JD, Duncan, Cass, Alex, Cicada, Kodi
- "Prima Donna, Fabulous (reprise)" - Adrienne
- "Burnin' Hunk of Clay" - Emily
- "Simon Says" - Alex, Cicada, Kodi
- "Distance" - Cass, Connor
- "Burnin' Hunk of Clay (reprise)" - Midge (**note: this song was only included after the addition of this character in a revision of the production)
- "Family of Misfits" - Connor, company
- "Finale: Realize" - company
- "15 Minutes (reprise)" - company
