= Julie Lemieux =

Canadian voice actress

- Born: Val-des-Sources, Quebec, Canada
- Occupation: Voice actress
- Years active: 1989–present
- Website: https://www.julielemieux.ca/

Julie Lemieux is a Canadian voice actress working on animated movies.

== Early life ==
Lemieux was born in Val-des-Sources, Quebec, the oldest of three children to Mary (née Cowan) and Jean-Louis Lemieux.

== Career ==
Lemieux has provided the voice for characters such as Sammy Tsukino in Sailor Moon, young Darien Shields in Sailor Moon R: The Movie, and Peruru in Sailor Moon SuperS: The Movie.

She has also played Funshine Bear in Care Bears: Journey to Joke-a-lot and The Care Bears' Big Wish Movie. She was also the voice of Dumpty in Polka Dot Shorts and Rupert Bear in the animated TV series of the same name. Lemieux also acted as Warren in Monster by Mistake and Toby of the new anime production Pandalian.

In 2006, she worked on the television series What It's Like Being Alone; She has voiced Hunter Steele in the English version of Spider Riders, Ikki in Medabots Spirits, and Wilbur the Calf in Wilbur.

She is also the voice for Renee in the TV series Jacob Two-Two, Mariah Wong in the English anime version of Beyblade, Runo in Bakugan Battle Brawlers, Antique Annie in Producing Parker, Louise in Max & Ruby, Bounce in Miss Spider's Sunny Patch Friends, Chance Happening in Grojband, Clancy in Julius Jr., Greta in Detentionaire, Bud Compson in Arthur, Paisley Paver in Wild Kratts, Fuzzy Snuggums in Spliced, Dabs Looman in Skatoony, Granny Butternut in Numb Chucks, Cali in PAW Patrol, Josee and Kelly in Total Drama Presents: The Ridonculous Race, and Flo in Total DramaRama.

== Filmography ==
=== Film ===
- Sailor Moon R: The Movie (2000) - Young Mamoru Chiba (English dub)
- Sailor Moon SuperS: The Movie (2000) - Perle (English dub)
- Rolie Polie Olie: The Baby Bot Chase (2003) - Coochie, Coo
- Care Bears: Journey to Joke-a-lot (2004) - Funshine Bear
- Beyblade: Fierce Battle (2005) - Miss Kincaid (English dub)
- The Care Bears' Big Wish Movie (2005) - Funshine Bear
- Tidal Wave (2009) - American Woman at Beach/UN Reporter: France & Canada
- Aftershock (2010) - Woman at Basketball Park (English dub)
- Fish N Chips: The Movie (2013) - Ting, Marraine
- The Nut Job (2014) - Girl Scout
- End of Days, Inc. (2015) - Nana (voice)
- The Nut Job 2: Nutty by Nature (2017) - Lil' Chip
- Elliot the Littlest Reindeer (2018) - Bluuberry, Olga, Computer Translator, Swedish Coach, Moshennika, Bruno, Computer Translator

=== Television ===
- Hello Kitty and Friends (1989–94) - Jody, Julianna Scott (in "Mom Loves Me After All"), Peter Fisher (in "Heidi") (English dub)
  - Keroppi and Friends (1989–94) - Soak (Kyorosuke), Carl (Pekkle episodes only), Curtis (Koroppi, "Find the Pink Mushroom"), Speedy ("The Frog's Secret House") (English dub)
- Rupert (1992–97) - Rupert Bear (seasons 2–5, replacing Ben Sanford)
- The Busy World of Richard Scarry (1994–96) - Russ
- Stickin' Around (1996–98) - Additional voices
- Rolie Polie Olie (1998–2004) - Clock Mouse ("A Totally Backwards Day"), Coochie, Coo
- Monster by Mistake (1999–2003) - Warren Patterson
- Little People (1999–2007) - Michael
- Diabolik (1999–2001) - Naomi
- Medabots Spirits (2000–01) - Ikki, Ikki's Mom, Brass, Neutranurse, Medabot/Kilobot Announcer, Honey
- Pelswick (2000–02) - Julie Smockford
- Maggie and the Ferocious Beast (2001–02) - Oscar, Zack, Max
- Undergrads (2001) - Rita the R.A.
- Pecola (2001–02) - Miss Lucky
- Anne of Green Gables: The Animated Series (2001) - Fairy
- Beyblade (2002) - Mariah Wong and Dizzi
- Moville Mysteries (2002) - Witch, Hannah's mother
- Max & Ruby (2002–20) - Louise
- Arthur (2002–22) - Kara, Bud Compson, Cisely Compson, Carl's Mom, Muk, Hippo
- Jacob Two-Two (2003) - Renee
- Medabots Spirit (2003–04) - Ikki Tenryou
- King (2003-05) Ex-Princess Populah
- Rotting Hills (2005) - Zoe
- Miss Spider’s Sunny Patch Friends (2004–09) - Bounce
- Spider Riders (2006–07) - Hunter Steele
- Pandalian (2006–07) - Toby
- Magi-Nation (2007) - Evu
- Doodlebops Rockin' Road Show - Big Lou, Lead Spider, Mom Bird, Fan #1, Justin's voice double, Joan 1 & 3
- Wilbur (2007–08) - Wilbur
- The Wumblers (2007) - Bertrum
- Clang Invasion (2007) - Robin
- Total Drama Island (2007) - Heather's Mom
- Wayside (2007–08) - Mrs. Gorf
- Magi-Nation (2007–10) - Iyori, Sorranther
- Bakugan Battle Brawlers (2008–09) - Runo Misaki, Sirenoid, Harpus, Lars Lion and Komba O'Charlie
- Cyberchase (2008–10) - Fergie, Mayor, Shari Spotter, Tappy
- Poppets Town (2009–11) - Cocori
- Bob & Doug (2009-11) - Heather Donhuckle
- Producing Parker (2009–11) - Antique Annie, Ghost Shouter, Opportunist Woman
- Bakugan Battle Brawlers: New Vestroia (2009–10) - Runo Misaki, Sirenoid, Lars Lion (English dub)
- Bakugan: Gundalian Invaders (2010–11) - Runo Misaki, Queen Serena (English dub)
- Bakugan: Mechtanium Surge (2011–12) - Runo Misaki (English dub)
- The Amazing Spiez! (2009–12) - Tony Clark
- Busytown Mysteries (2007–10) - Pig Will, Hilda
- Spliced (2009–10) - Fuzzy Snuggums
- Skatoony (2010–13) - Dabs Looman
- The Cat in the Hat Knows a Lot About That! (2011–12) - Twitch, Milly, Jilly
- Almost Naked Animals (2011–13) - Batty
- Detentionaire (2011–13) - Greta, Cassandra
- Scaredy Squirrel (2011–13) - Additional voices
- The Beet Party (2012) - Boom-Ka, Wooga Booga
- The Day My Butt Went Psycho! (2013–15) - Gran
- Grojband (2013–15) - Chance Happening
- Paw Patrol (2013–present) - Cali
- Julius Jr. (2013–14) - Clancy
- Camp Lakebottom (2013–17) - Additional voices
- Peg + Cat (2014) - Flat Woman
- Numb Chucks (2014–16) - Grandma Butternut
- Total Drama Presents: The Ridonculous Race (2015) - Josee (26 episodes), Kelly (10 episodes)
- Inspector Gadget (2015–18) - Dr. Ithica Marvins, Computer, Pasha
- The Adventures of Napkin Man! (2015–16) - Mrs. Bailom, Stretcho Girl, Strong Stella
- PJ Masks (2015–16) - Additional voices
- Rusty Rivets (2016) - Whirly, Crush
- Freaktown (2016) - Princess Boo Boo the Bouncy
- Fangbone! (2016–17) - Hammerscab, The Toe
- Wishfart (2017) - Janice
- Top Wing (2017) - Additional voices
- The Magic School Bus Rides Again (2017) - Additional voices
- Mysticons (2017–18) - The Dragon Disk, Serena Snakecharmer
- True and the Rainbow Kingdom (2017–19) - Mila, TTT Bus
- Wild Kratts (2017–present) - Paisley Paver
- Gary and His Demons (2018) - Mrs. Cranbrook, Mom, Succubus
- Cupcake & Dino: General Services (2018–19) - Grandma Steak
- Total DramaRama (2018–19) - Flo
- Gary and His Demons (2018–22) - Gary's Mom
- Bakugan: Battle Planet (2019) - Phaedrus
- Snoopy in Space (2019–21) - Bird Bud #3
- Trailer Park Boys: The Animated Series (2019) - Freja
- Bigfoot (2019) - French Agent #1
- Hero Elementary (2020) - Mrs. Mangia, Soccer Coach, Kite Flying Boy
- Bitmoji TV (2020) - Demon Bear
- Alien TV (2020) - Pixbee
- Doomsday Brothers (2020) - Judith
- Corn & Peg (2020) - Ferris and Ferdy's Grandmare
- Glowbies (2021) - Drippy
- Transformers: BotBots (2022) - Lady Macaron, Jacqueline
- The Dragon Prince (2023) - Archmage Akiyu
- Work It Out Wombats! (2023) - Carly, Cece, and Clyde
- My Little Pony: Make Your Mark (2023) - Allura

=== Video games ===
- Suikoden Tierkreis (2009) - Roberto
- Bakugan Battle Brawlers (2009) - Runo Misaki, Komba
- Hearthstone (2014) - Additional voices
