= Super Wish =

Canadian animated television series

- Created by: Adrian Thatcher; Vanessa Esteves
- Voices of: Tristan Mammitzsch; Delia Lisette Chambers; Alyzia Inès Fabregui; Lucas Nguyen; Sugar Lyn Beard; Bryn McAuley; Thor Bishopric; Mark Ricci; Teale Bishopric; Lucinda Davis; Cory Doran; Neil Robles; Jorja Cadence; Ian Ho; Michael Hanrahan; Julius Cho; Kintaro Akiyama; Jonathan Tan; David Berni; Krystal Meadows; Bianca Alongi; Elliot Couillard; Kwaku Adu-Poku
- Country of origin: Canada
- Original language: English
- No. of episodes: 26 (52 segments)

Production
- Production companies: Nelvana; Redknot

Original release
- Network: YTV
- Release: June 4, 2022 – March 11, 2023

Super Wish is a Canadian animated children's television series. It was created by Adrian Thatcher and Vanessa Esteves for the Nelvana studio. It debuted on YTV on June 4, 2022. In the United States, the series began streaming on Peacock in October 2024.

The series stars Tristan Mammitzsch as Jesse's voice, with supporting and guest voices including Delia Lisette Chambers, Alyzia Inès Fabregui, Lucas Nguyen, Sugar Lyn Beard, Bryn McAuley, Thor Bishopric, Mark Ricci, Teale Bishopric, Lucinda Davis, Cory Doran, Neil Robles, Jorja Cadence, Ian Ho, Michael Hanrahan, Julius Cho, Kintaro Akiyama, Jonathan Tan, David Berni, Krystal Meadows, Bianca Alongi, Elliot Couillard and Kwaku Adu-Poku.

== Plot ==
The series centres on Jesse, a young boy who is sucked into an alternate dimension with his friends after accidentally "wishing" that his birthday party would disappear, and has to figure out how to get back home while travelling through a fantasy land where they discover a different international birthday-related tradition in each episode.

== Characters ==
=== Main ===
- Jesse Cameron (voiced by Tristan Mammitzsch) – A 10-year-old boy who is the main character of the series, he is Winnie's cousin.
- Winnie (voiced by Lisette Chambers) – A brave and sweet 6-year-old girl, she is Jesse's little cousin.
- Sadie (voiced by Alyzia Inès Favregui) – A 9-year old girl who likes sports, especially volleyball, she is one of Jesse's best friends.
- Zander (voiced by Lucas Nguyen) – A 9-year old boy who likes to play videogames, he is one of Jesse's best friends.
- Maylin (voiced by Bryn McAuley) - A warrior girl who attacks threatening creatures and protects the Happy Land of Birthdays.
- Fert - It's a flexible green balloon that's Maylin's companion and helps her protect the Happy Land of Birthdays.
- Bon-Bon (vocal effects provided by Mark Ricci) - A mixed-piñata chicken who lays magic eggs once per episode.
- Ronny Bobby Candle 4 (voiced by Sugar Lyn Beard) - A female magic candle, who guides the group in their journey to find the Super Wish.

=== Villains ===
- Balloonicus (voiced by Cory Doran) - A balloon who is the main villain of the series; he wants to steal Jesse's Super Wish to destroy Happy Land of Birthdays.
- Glenn - He's Balloonicus' sidekick; he's a cotton candy character and helps the villain with his plans.
- Caker Pops - They are Balloonicus' army; they are various cake sticks and can vary in color.

== Episodes ==
No.	Title	Written by	Original release date
1	"The Big 1-0/Enter the Hee Roar"	Unknown	4 June 2022
2	"Gift Grove/Simon Says Relax"	Unknown	11 June 2022
3	"Welcome to the Jingle/The Button and the Coin"	Unknown	18 June 2022
4	"Keep It Up/Go Go Grogopogo"	Unknown	25 June 2022
5	"Three's a Crowd/Copycat"	Unknown	2 July 2022
6	"Taste Buddies/Imagination Caboose"	Unknown	9 July 2022
7	"The Floor Is Definitely Not Lava/Plaza de Piñata"	Unknown	16 July 2022
8	"Den for Over 10s/Mochi-Zuna"	Unknown	23 July 2022
9	"The First Birthday Cake/100s & 1000s"	Unknown	30 July 2022
10	"Sticky Situation/Bring in the Clowns"	Unknown	6 August 2022
11	"Call of the Waxkeeper/Hats Off"	Unknown	13 August 2022
12	"Hide & Spell/Pabitin for the Win"	Unknown	20 August 2022
13	"Legend of Cake-Bun Bottoms Pt 1/Legend of Cake-Bun Bottoms Pt 2"	Unknown	27 August 2022
14	"Pinata Trouble/Abracadabra"	Unknown	3 September 2022
15	"Square Cat Winnie/Card Tricked"	Unknown	10 September 2022
16	"Christmas in Decemburg/A Barthdae Carol"	Unknown	19 November 2022
17	"Princess Party/Unhappy Land of Birthdays"	Unknown	26 November 2022
18	"Wishwharf/The Amazing Maze"	Unknown	3 December 2022
19	"24 Carrot Gold/Pass the Parcel"	Unknown	21 January 2023
20	"Under the Rainbow/Don't Cave"	Unknown	28 January 2023
21	"Mega Mini Mayhem/Wrap it Up"	Unknown	4 February 2023
22	"La Mordida/The Party's Over"	Unknown	11 February 2023
23	"Which Digit Did it/Ultimate Musical Chairs"	Unknown	18 February 2023
24	"Slumber Blunder/Who's Afraid of the Big Bad Balloon"	Unknown	25 February 2023
25	"Gummy Grounder Down Under/Fools of the Game"	Unknown	4 March 2023
26	"The Ballooniverse Pageant/The Way Back Home"	Unknown	11 March 2023

== Recognition ==
Year	Award	Category	Recipient	Status	Ref
Canadian Screen Awards	2023	Visual Effects	Andy Powell, Raymond Pang "The Floor Is Definitely Not Lava"	Nominated	
Canadian Screen Awards	2023	Sound in an Animated Program or Series	Ryan Araki, Evan Turner, Neil Parfitt, Andrew McDonnell, Richard Spence-Thomas "Taste Buddies/Imagination Caboose"	Nominated	
Canadian Screen Awards	2023	Original Music, Animation	Neil Parfitt	Nominated	
Canadian Screen Awards	2024	Performance in an Animated Program or Series	Cory Doran	Nominated	
Canadian Screen Awards	2024	Editing in an Animated Program or Series	Jamie Ebata, Kirk Hudson "The Ballooniverse Pageant / The Way Back Home"	Nominated	
Canadian Screen Awards	2024	Sound in an Animated Program or Series	Ryan Araki, Evan Turner, Neil Parfitt, Andrew McDonnell, Richard Spence-Thomas "The Ballooniverse Pageant / The Way Back Home"	Nominated	
Canadian Screen Awards	2024	Original Music, Animation	Neil Parfitt "The Ballooniverse Pageant / The Way Back Home"	Nominated	
Canadian Screen Music Awards	2023	Best Original Score for an Animated Series or Special	Neil Parfitt "The Legend of Cake-Bun Bottom"	Nominated	
