= Looped (TV series) =

- Genre: Comedy; Science fiction; Slapstick comedy; Adventure; Animation
- Created by: Todd Kauffman; Mark Thornton
- Directed by: Mark Thornton; Todd Kauffman
- Voices of: Lyon Smith; Kevin Duhaney
- Theme music composer: Asher Lenz; Stephen Skratt
- Opening theme: "You're in a Loop" (written and performed by Asher & Skratt)
- Composers: Brian Pickett; James Chappie; Graeme Cornies; David Kelly
- Country of origin: Canada
- Original language: English
- No. of seasons: 1
- No. of episodes: 26 (51 segments)

Production
- Executive producers: Steven DeNure; Kirsten Newlands; Mark Thornton; Todd Kauffman
- Producer: Robert Anderson
- Running time: 22 minutes
- Production company: DHX Media

Original release
- Network: Teletoon
- Release: March 2 – August 16, 2016

Looped is a Canadian animated television series created by Todd Kauffman and Mark Thornton (who also created Grojband) for Teletoon. It premiered in Canada on March 2, 2016. It also premiered on January 4, 2016, in Latin America on Cartoon Network and in the United Kingdom on CITV.

== Plot ==
The series revolves around the life and adventures of Luc and Theo, two 12-year-old boys from the town of Port Doover who attend Port Doover Middle School. Due to an accident in Theo's garage with an invention he created, the two boys are stuck in a time loop where every day is the same Monday, October 12. Since the events of that day are always the same, the two know exactly what will happen where and when. They use this knowledge as an opportunity to do whatever they want at school and around their town, usually causing problems when their actions cause errors and other unusual events to occur in the time loop.

== Characters ==
=== Main ===
- Lucas "Luc" Maxwell (voiced by Mac Heywood in the pilot, Lyon Smith in the main series) – Theo's lazy and unintelligent best friend who uses the loop to indulge in endless mayhem with no regard for the consequences of his actions.
- Theodore "Theo" Merton Jr. (voiced by Bryn McAuley in the pilot, and Kevin Duhaney in the main series) – Luc's nerdy and responsible African-Canadian best friend who has great knowledge of the loop (in the episode "Monster Stink", he reveals that the time loop has lasted three years) and plays the straight man to Luc.

=== Classmates ===
- Jesse (voiced by Scott Gorman) – The flatulent and short-tempered school bully. His fondness for picking on other children is contrasted with his proud vegetarianism and love of nature and animals.
- Gwyneth "Gwyn" Sanders (voiced by Denise Oliver) – A bespectacled, pink-haired girl who has strong romantic feelings for Luc but despises Theo and is unable to remember his name. Despite this, Luc is disgusted by her while Theo is infatuated with her.
- Sarah Doover (voiced by Alyson Court) – An extremely popular girl who never speaks and communicates entirely through texting on her cellphone. She only speaks in the final episode, where it is revealed that she was saving her voice for an upcoming talent show.
- Kelly and Kelli (voiced by Stephanie Lynn Robinson) (pronounced "Kel-ee" and "Kel-iye") – Identical twin sisters who serve as Sarah's followers, issuing her commands and informing others of her moods, opinions, and actions.
- Kyle Bush (voiced by Adam Cawley) – An extremely handsome, compassionate, and popular boy in the school who is perfect and flawless in every way. Luc hates him for this, and is always trying to outdo him.
- Lester (voiced by Mark Edwards) – A nerd interested in video games and LARP. He is always stuffed inside his locker by Jesse, and then intentionally spends the entire day there to play video games.
- Amy (voiced by Stacey DePass) – A goth girl who hides in the school basement.
- Jerry Rivers (voiced by Sergio Di Zio) – The bespectacled reporter for Port Doover Elementary School, he hosts a news show that provides important and factual, if extremely boring, coverage of all the major events the school's students should know about. Every Monday, he reports on the tightening of a loose screw on the statue of Wilt Doover, the town's founder.

=== Adults ===
- Principal Applecrab (voiced by Darren Frost) – The frail and bespectacled principal of Port Doover Elementary School. Luc and Theo often trick him into performing painful or humiliating actions at the school assembly for their amusement.
- Coach Lessard (voiced by Seán Cullen) – Luc and Theo's morbidly obese gym teacher who gets around on a golf cart. It is revealed in the episode "Badmerton to the Bone" that his left arm is bionic.
- Mr. LemonJello (voiced by Seán Cullen) – Luc and Theo's monotonous, apathetic science teacher.
- Theo Merton Sr. – Theo's father. A former badminton champion who runs a sporting goods store.
- Claire (voiced by Athena Karkanis) – Luc's self-centered and incompetent teenage babysitter. As his parents are away on a three-day trip, she is Luc's guardian and has effectively replaced them due to the loop having started on the second day.
- Wilt Doover
- Tinna Lokinse (voiced by Anna Louch) (pronounced "luk-ence")- Luc's lazy math teacher who always falls asleep while teaching so the kids just go crazy.

== Episodes ==
No.	Title	Directed by	Written by	Storyboard by	Original release date
1a	"Dodge This"	Mark Thornton and Todd Kauffman	Craig Martin	Paul Watling	March 2, 2016
Luc and Theo are tired of being constantly defeated in dodgeball by Jesse and use the loop to outplay him.
1b	"Theo Fly"	Mark Thornton and Todd Kauffman	Meghan Read	Steve Daye; Paul Watling; Brian Coughlan	March 2, 2016
Theo accidentally swallows a fly and starts becoming one.
2a	"She's All Bot"	Mark Thornton and Todd Kauffman	Meghan Read	Dipesh Mistry	March 2, 2016
Theo builds a robot version of Gwyn to help him and Luc keep track of events in the loop.
2b	"All Things Being Sequel"	Mark Thornton and Todd Kauffman	Andrew Harrison	Steve Stefanelli	March 2, 2016
Tired of watching the same movie at the theater every Monday, Luc and Theo make their own sequel to show instead.
3a	"4 Out of 5 Dentists Prefer the Loop"	Mark Thornton and Todd Kauffman	Amy Cole	Andrew Murray	March 9, 2016
Luc gets braces, but when the loop resets, he is transformed into a robot by them.
3b	"Sickwich"	Mark Thornton and Todd Kauffman	Kyle Hart	Ted Collyer	March 9, 2016
Luc brings an expired sandwich to school that causes a pandemic.
4a	"There's a New Principal in Town"	Mark Thornton and Todd Kauffman	Shawn Kalb	Brian Coughlan	March 16, 2016
Luc and Theo decide to make Coach Lessard their school's principal, but the power ends up going to his head.
4b	"Getted Smart"	Mark Thornton and Todd Kauffman	Andrew Harrison	Trevor Hierons	March 16, 2016
Luc cheats on a standardized test and is mistaken for a genius by government agents.
5a	"Fart Busters"	Mark Thornton and Todd Kauffman	Craig Martin	Kyle Marshall	March 23, 2016
Luc and Theo destroy Jesse's fart box, only to unleash an army of ghosts made of farts on the school.
5b	"Monster Stink"	Mark Thornton and Todd Kauffman	Meghan Read	Dae Jung	March 23, 2016
After Stan, a gigantic pink bird monster, is discovered living in the school closet. Luc and Theo accidentally release him.
6a	"Applecrab-Dabra"	Mark Thornton and Todd Kauffman	Story by : Shawn Kalb; Teleplay by : Craig Martin	Kevin Currie	March 30, 2016
Luc and Theo learn that Principal Applecrab wants to become a stage magician, and they try to help him achieve his dream.
6b	"Monday Circles"	Mark Thornton and Todd Kauffman	Kyle Hart	Helder Mondonca	March 30, 2016
Amy gets a hold of Theo's tablet and learns all about the existence of time loops.
7a	"The Replacements"	Mark Thornton and Todd Kauffman	Meghan Read	Dipesh Mistry	April 6, 2016
Tired of having Sarah constantly steal their attention, Luc and Theo come up with a plan to get rid of Kelly and Kelli, but they end up taking their place instead.
7b	"Luc at Me"	Mark Thornton and Todd Kauffman	Craig Martin	Steve Stefanelli	April 6, 2016
Luc uses the loop to become a famous daredevil.
8a	"Loop It Forward"	Mark Thornton and Todd Kauffman	Evan Thaler Hickey	Andrew Murray	April 13, 2016
Luc and Theo use the loop to help improve other people's day.
8b	"Chick Magnet"	Mark Thornton and Todd Kauffman	Josh Saltzman	Ted Collyer	April 13, 2016
Theo uses an invention to speed up the growth process of a chicken egg that Gwyn is incubating in science class.
9a	"The Gifted Class"	Mark Thornton and Todd Kauffman	Ben Joseph	Brian Coughlan	April 20, 2016
Luc and Theo discover a secret club of geniuses, and Theo becomes determined to be accepted into their group.
9b	"Sooper Loopers"	Mark Thornton and Todd Kauffman	Craig Martin	Trevor Hierons	April 20, 2016
Luc and Theo use their knowledge of the loop to become superheroes.
10a	"Birthday Cake Island"	Mark Thornton and Todd Kauffman	Josh Saltzman	Kyle Marshall	April 27, 2016
Luc is unhappy with the fact that his birthday will never come, so Theo takes him across time zones to celebrate his birthday on Birthday Cake Island.
10b	"Zap's Day Off"	Mark Thornton and Todd Kauffman	Meghan Read	Craig Valde	April 28, 2016
Luc and Theo search for a famous dog who has disappeared.
11a	"Port Fear"	Mark Thornton and Todd Kauffman	Evan Thaler Hickey	Kevin Currie	May 4, 2016
Theo comes down with a case of the hiccups that will not reset with the loop.
11b	"Jan-Itor-Nado"	Mark Thornton and Todd Kauffman	Ben Joseph	Jamie Leclaire	May 4, 2016
Theo tries to get Luc to be more respectful towards Port Doover Elementary's janitor.
12a	"Baby Daddy"	Mark Thornton and Todd Kauffman	Alice Prodanou	Dipesh Mistry	May 11, 2016
Luc accidentally turns Theo into a baby.
12b	"Wizard of Wacker Maze"	Mark Thornton and Todd Kauffman	Meghan Read	Steve Stefanelli	May 11, 2016
Luc tries to beat Kyle's high score at a video game, but the loop causes the video game to come to life.
13a	"11 Minutes to Lame"	Mark Thornton and Todd Kauffman	Alice Prodanou	Jeff White	May 18, 2016
Luc and Theo become celebrities after they use their knowledge of the loop to create a music video.
13b	"Larping in the Loop"	Mark Thornton and Todd Kauffman	Craig Martin	Ted Collyer	May 18, 2016
Luc and Theo follow Lester to discover what he does after school.
14a	"Space Burrito"	Mark Thornton and Todd Kauffman	Kyle Hart	Trevor Hierons	May 25, 2016
After eating all the goulash sauce at his favorite burrito restaurant, Luc becomes the target of hostile aliens that desire the sauce for spaceship fuel.
14b	"Ronnie Trasco"	Mark Thornton and Todd Kauffman	Josh Saltzman	Brian Coughlan	May 25, 2016
Luc and Theo encounter an undercover agent named Ronnie Trasco, who wants them to help discover who has stolen Principal Applecrab's favorite doll.
15a	"Badmerton to the Bone"	Mark Thornton and Todd Kauffman	Evan Thaler Hickey	Kyle Marshall	June 1, 2016
Luc and Theo learn that Theo's dad was a former badminton champion until he was defeated and forced into retirement by Coach Lessard.
15b	"Loop – There It Is"	Mark Thornton and Todd Kauffman	Story by : Brad Birch; Teleplay by : Craig Martin	Craig Valde	June 1, 2016
Luc takes over the television show of school news reporter Jerry Rivers.
16a	"Bald Is Beautiful"	Mark Thornton and Todd Kauffman	Andrew Harrison	Jamie Leclaire	June 8, 2016
Luc shaves his head to become bald, but the loop causes everyone else to start growing beards.
16b	"Nerdnesia"	Mark Thornton and Todd Kauffman	Josh Saltzman	Kevin Currie	June 8, 2016
Theo invites Lester over for a game, but when the loop resets, Lester replaces Theo as one of the only two people unaffected by the loop.
17a	"Oiled Thunder"	Mark Thornton and Todd Kauffman	Craig Martin	Dipesh Mistry	June 15, 2016
Theo befriends the school's auto shop kids.
17b	"Reverse Mermaid"	Mark Thornton and Todd Kauffman	Kyle Hart	Steve Stefanelli	June 15, 2016
Luc and Theo discover that their classmate Splash Hannah is secretly a reverse mermaid (upper body of a fish, lower body of a human).
18a	"Fallout Room Boy"	Mark Thornton and Todd Kauffman	Evan Thaler Hickey	Ted Collyer	June 22, 2016
Luc discovers a fallout bunker from the 1950s in the school basement, where a boy named Mel has been living.
18b	"Rocket to Tomorrow"	Mark Thornton and Todd Kauffman	Andrew Harrison	Jeff White	June 22, 2016
Luc and Theo try to sneak aboard a rocket ship to go to space, but Claire steals their tickets.
19a	"Re-Vamp"	Mark Thornton and Todd Kauffman	Craig Martin	Brian Coughlan	June 29, 2016
Luc is bitten by a vampire, but the effects of the loop cause the vampire that bit him to become a human.
19b	"Release the Krakenfoot"	Mark Thornton and Todd Kauffman	Story by : Brad Birch; Teleplay by : Craig Martin	Trevor Hierons	June 29, 2016
Luc and Theo create a new mascot for Port Doover Elementary School's football team.
20a	"Ninjitsu for Beginners"	Mark Thornton and Todd Kauffman	Josh Saltzman	Kyle Marshall	July 5, 2016
Luc and Theo become martial artists trained in two rival schools of combat.
20b	"A Kyle in His Shoes"	Mark Thornton and Todd Kauffman	Brad Birch	Craig Valde	July 5, 2016
Jealous of Kyle's popularity, Luc tries to prove to Theo that he can do everything Kyle does on his Monday routine.
21a	"Moby Piranha"	Mark Thornton and Todd Kauffman	Evan Thaler Hickey	Kevin Currie	July 12, 2016
Luc and Theo help Coach Lessard hunt down the school's pet piranha when it escapes and turns gigantic.
21b	"Loopy Loops"	Mark Thornton and Todd Kauffman	Kyle Hart	Dipesh Mistry	July 12, 2016
Luc and Theo visit the factory that creates their favorite cereal, Loopy Loops, and discover that its creator and town founder Wilt Doover is alive and cryogenically frozen in sugar crystal.
22a	"A Glitch in Time"	Mark Thornton and Todd Kauffman	Meghan Read	Jamie Leclaire	July 19, 2016
Luc and Theo encounter a time traveler from 1886 who is actually their ancestor.
22b	"Out of Time"	Mark Thornton and Todd Kauffman	Craig Martin	Steve Stefanelli	July 19, 2016
A pair of time cops named McGal and Spritz come to Port Doover to arrest the creators of the time loop.
23a	"Plight at the Museum"	Mark Thornton and Todd Kauffman	Evan Thaler Hickey	Arna Selznick	July 26, 2016
Luc and Theo discover a time-controlling weapon on display at the museum and organize a heist to take it before the museum's owner can use it for evil.
23b	"The Exciting Conclusion"	Mark Thornton and Todd Kauffman	Josh Saltzman	Jeff White	July 26, 2016
Theo gets Luc invested in a book, but Luc is unhappy that the concluding sequel will never be written.
24a	"Power Plant"	Mark Thornton and Todd Kauffman	Andrew Harrison	Brian Coughlan	August 2, 2016
Theo creates an electric flower that is mutated by the loop's reset into a monster that drains all the power in Port Doover.
24b	"Back in the Saddle"	Mark Thornton and Todd Kauffman	Craig Martin	Todd Sullivan	August 2, 2016
Luc and Theo discover that McGal and Spritz have been fired as time police, and they try to help them get new jobs.
25a	"Glitch Girl"	Mark Thornton and Todd Kauffman	Evan Thaler Hickey	Kevin Currie	August 9, 2016
Theo disguises himself as a girl to get close to Gwyn on her all-girls roller derby team.
25b	"A Fortuitous Future"	Mark Thornton and Todd Kauffman	Meghan Read	Craig Valde	August 9, 2016
Luc and Theo encounter a fortune teller, who is confused as to why they are the only people in Port Doover whose futures she can read.
26	"Balanced Breakfast"	Mark Thornton and Todd Kauffman	Craig Martin	Jamie Leclaire	August 16, 2016
The loop starts going out of control, causing glitches to spontaneously appear all over the universe. Luc and Theo must find the original box of Loopy Loops cereal that created it in order to save the loop.

== Broadcast and release ==
The series aired on Teletoon from March 2, 2016, to August 16, 2016. It aired on CITV in the UK and in Africa. The series is airing on Primo TV in the United States. The show has previously aired reruns on Nickelodeon Canada and Disney XD Canada until August 2020.

Looped has also been sold to Super RTL (Germany), Zoom (Israel), K2 (Italy), Gulli (France) and HBO Go (Poland).

== Reception ==
Emily Ashby of Common Sense Media described the series as a "time warp buddy comedy" which "despite being a time loop series… never gets old." She also called it "lovely and meaningful entertainment for kids".
