= Elliot the Littlest Reindeer =

2018 Canadian animated Christmas film

- Film poster
- Directed by: Jennifer Westcott
- Written by: Jennifer Westcott
- Produced by: Lucas Lynette-Krech; Victoria Westcott
- Starring: Josh Hutcherson; Samantha Bee; Martin Short; Morena Baccarin; Jeff Dunham; John Cleese
- Edited by: Ali Lynette-Krech
- Music by: Igor Correia; Robert Melamed
- Production companies: Awesometown Entertainment; Double Dutch International; Elgin Road Productions
- Distributed by: Elevation Pictures (Canada); Netflix (selected territories)
- Release dates: October 19, 2018 (Turkey); December 4, 2018 (Canada)
- Running time: 89 minutes
- Country: Canada
- Language: English
- Box office: $2.2 million

Elliot the Littlest Reindeer is a 2018 Canadian animated Christmas film written and directed by Jennifer Wescott and featuring the voices of Josh Hutcherson, Samantha Bee, Martin Short, Morena Baccarin, Jeff Dunham and John Cleese. When Blitzen retires from Santa's reindeer team, Elliot and his friend Hazel travel to the North Pole. As Elliot takes on the North Pole tryouts, Hazel learns that Christmas may be headed for disaster. Meanwhile, back at their farm, a sinister lady threatens the lives of their friends, and Elliot is faced with the biggest decision of his life.

== Plot ==
At the struggling Witty Bitty Farm in North Dakota, Elliot, a miniature horse, dreams of flying on Santa Claus's sleigh team. His only supporter is a goat named Hazel. Inherited by former baseball player Walter Whittick, the farm operates as both a petting zoo and a training camp for reindeer, who are known for being arrogant and self-centered. Although Elliot trains too, Walter overlooks him. Blitzen becomes the latest of Santa’s reindeer to retire, and tryouts are announced at the North Pole to find a replacement. Hoping to save the farm, Walter believes his most athletic reindeer, DJ, can earn the position. Meanwhile, businesswoman Ludzinka arrives and offers to buy the farm animals. Walter agrees to sell only the petting zoo animals, refusing to sell the reindeer, but Elliot and Hazel discover that Ludzinka's plan is to turn the animals into dehydrated food. In an effort to save them, they secretly stow away in Walter’s flying car as Walter travels to the North Pole with DJ and the farm's lead horse Clyde.

Using disguises, Hazel signs up Elliot for the tryouts with an elf named Jolene (Santa and his elves can communicate with animals). Head elf Lemondrop welcomes the competitors and goes over all the reindeer who left before sending the candidates off into the first round of tryouts. Despite Elliot's small stature, he narrowly advances. Clyde recognizes Elliot and Hazel, but Elliot pleads with him to keep his identity secret.

Hazel follows journalist Corkie into a hidden room filled with flying mechanical sleighs. Lemondrop appears and explains that the sleighs were previously used to deliver presents due to the reindeers’ poor performance, describing them as a backup system. Corkie and Hazel remain skeptical.

DJ admits to his father, Donner, that he is afraid of flying. Refusing to let DJ embarrass him, Donner secretly has him eat additional magic cookies that grant flying abilities to improve his performance in the next round, despite competitors being allowed only one cookie. Hazel sees DJ receiving the cookies from a disguised elf with a wrist tattoo. Despite DJ's advantage, Elliot achieves the highest score. After spotting Hazel, DJ exposes Elliot, shocking everyone. However, Hazel proves that DJ cheated by pointing out that he can still fly because he ate extra cookies, having eaten the same cookies herself. Santa loses all trust in the reindeer and cancels the tryouts, decidng to use the mechanical sleighs instead. Afterward, Hazel suggests that she and Elliot escape with the other animals once they return to the farm, but Elliot believes the situation is his fault.

As Walter retrieves Elliot, he talks to Ludzinka over the phone and agrees to sell her all the animals, including the reindeer. Hazel notices Jolene's wrist tattoo and realizes she was the elf who fed DJ. Hazel leads Corkie to a device capable of translating animal speech, allowing Hazel to communicate with her. Using the device, Hazel and Corkie discover that Lemondrop ordered Jolene to give DJ the cookies and orchestrated the reindeer retirements. They expose the scheme to Santa and everyone else. Feeling unappreciated for his work, Lemondrop confesses that he sabotaged the sleigh team to make Santa distrust reindeer and turn to mechanical sleighs, which he believed were the future. Enraged, Lemondrop activates a weather machine to create a snowstorm, but it spirals out of control. As everyone seeks shelter, Hazel is swept up in the storm. Elliot manages to turn off the machine and rescue Hazel.

After Walter learns of Ludzinka's true intentions, he attempts to contact her, but she ignores his call. When Walter's car fails to start, Elliot asks Santa for magic cookies so he and DJ can fly the group back to the farm and save the animals. Impressed by Elliot’s courage, Santa offers him the position on the sleigh team, but Elliot declines. Corkie accompanies the group. Upon arrival, they find the farm empty and believe Ludzinka has left with the animals, but discover that the animals have restrained her. Ludzinka is arrested and revealed to have been wanted by the authorities. Santa arrives and announces that another opening has become available on his sleigh team. Donner confesses that Lemondrop had been secretly supplying him with extra magic cookies to enhance his flying and retires to stay with DJ. Santa again offers the position to Elliot, who accepts. Santa departs with Elliot as a member of his sleigh team while the others celebrate.

== Voice cast ==
- Josh Hutcherson as Elliot, a pony
- Samantha Bee as Hazel, a red goat
- Martin Short as Lemondrop/Ludzinka/Blitzen
- Morena Baccarin as Corkie
- Jeff Dunham as Clyde/Peanutbutter
- John Cleese as Donner
- George Buza as Santa Claus
- Angela Fusco as Mrs. Claus
- Robert Tinkler as Walter/Russian Coach
- Julie Lemieux as Olga/Computer Translator/Swedish Coach/Reindeer 1/Moshennika/Blueberry
- Christopher Jacot as DJ/Ignacio/Kitchen Elf
- Carly Heffernan as Sasha/Reindeer 4
- Steph Lynn Robinson as Dancer/Reporter Elf/Reindeer 8

== Reception ==
The film received negative reviews from critics and has a 29% rating on Rotten Tomatoes, based on 21 reviews with an average rating of 4.8/10. The website's critical consensus reads, "On Dancer, on Prancer, on Vixen, on Blitzen -- but off with Elliot: The Little Reindeer, a farcical Christmas romp that's only slightly more entertaining than a heap of coal." Nell Minow of RogerEbert.com awarded the film one and a half out of four stars. Tara McNamara of Common Sense Media awarded the film two stars out of five.

== See also ==
- List of Christmas films
- Santa Claus in film
