= Steph Lynn Robinson =

Canadian actress

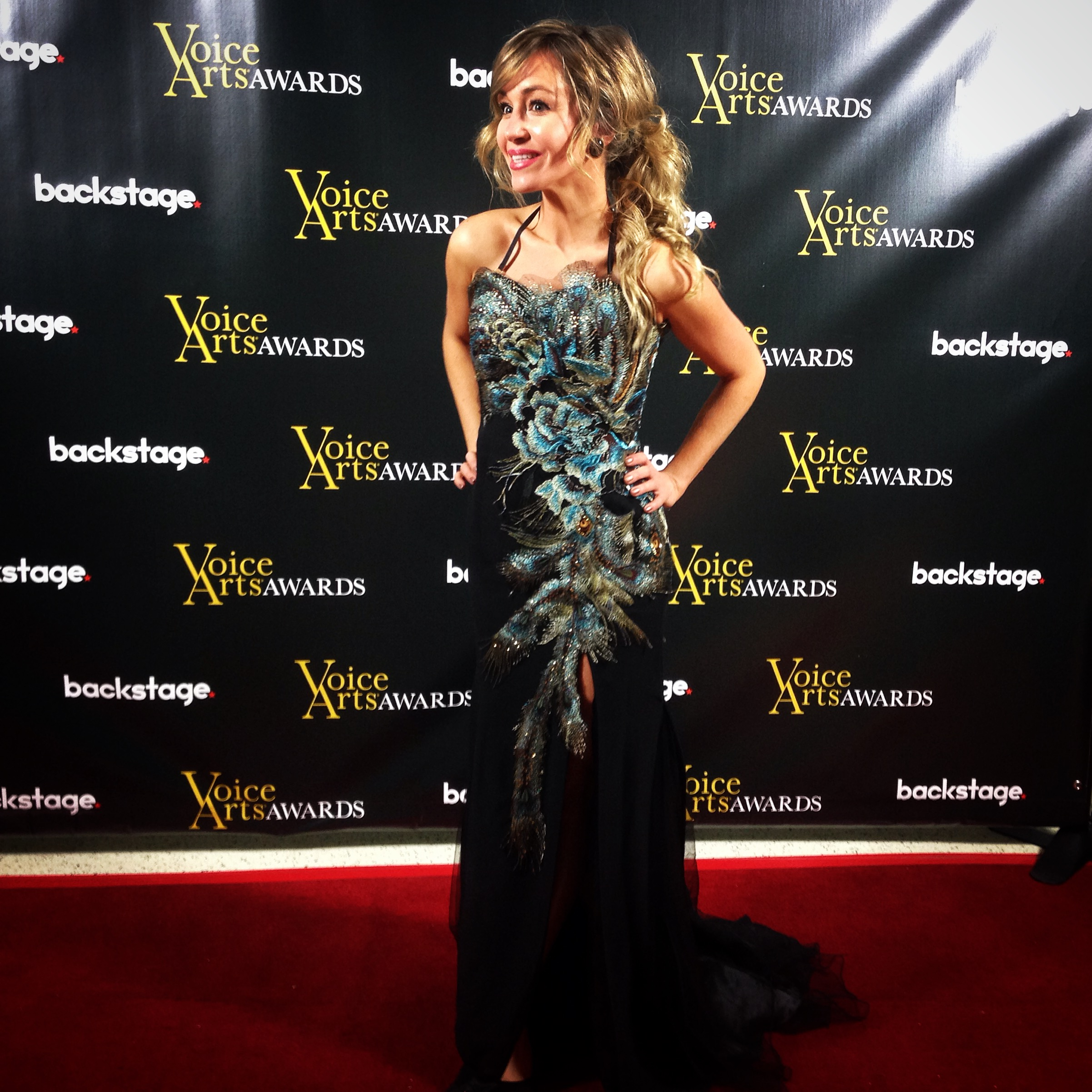
- Robinson in November 2015
- Born: Stephanie Lynn Robinson
- Occupations: Actress; producer
- Years active: 2007–present
- Website: stephlynnrobinson.com

Stephanie Lynn Robinson is a Canadian actress and producer.

Based in Austin, Texas, Robinson is a graduate of the Broadway Dance Center and American Musical and Dramatic Academy in New York City. She has voiced characters such as Priscilla in Freaktown, Ping and Chachi in Julius Jr., twins Kelly and Kelli in Looped, numerous roles on Super Why! and Little Charmers, and the reindeer Dancer in Elliot the Littlest Reindeer. She has been nominated for five consecutive Voice Arts Awards for "Outstanding TV Animation - Best Voiceover" and "Outstanding Animation Demo Reel" by the Society of Voice Arts and Sciences.

As a producer, Robinson has worked with Stornoway Productions as an associate producer of the Pet Network series Dog Park Tales. She is also credited a producer on the documentaries Infestation, The Civilian-Military Divide: Bridging the Gap, OMG!, and Investigation Discovery's Blood, Lies and Alibis.

== Filmography ==
=== Film ===
Year	Title	Role	Notes
2016	Elliot the Littlest Reindeer	Dancer / Reporter Elf / Reindeer 8 (voice)	

=== Television ===
Year	Title	Role	Notes
2007–2016	Super Why!	Hazel / Piper / Kid (voice)	7 episodes
2013–2015	Julius Jr.	Ping / Chachi (voice)	52 episodes
2015	Little Charmers	Fairy Alvie (voice)	1 episode
2015	Space Bacon	Badoomcha (voice)	1 episode
2016	Looped	Kelly / Kelli (voice)	26 episodes
2016	Luna Petunia	Zoom Shine (voice)	10 episodes
2016	Freaktown	Priscilla (voice)	26 episodes
2021–2022	Glowbies	Becky (voice)	26 episodes

=== Stage ===
Year	Title	Role	Notes
2007	Finding Nemo – The Musical	Deb	
2007	Idol: The Musical	Emily	
