= Powerbirds =

- Genre: Children's television series Action; Superhero
- Created by: Stephen P. Breen; Jennifer Monier-Williams
- Story by: Ben Joseph; Robin J. Stein; Craig Martin
- Directed by: William Gordon
- Voices of: Cory Doran; Tara Strong
- Theme music composer: PT Walkley
- Opening theme: "Powerbirds" performed by Adam Sanders and Carmen Yanuzielle
- Ending theme: "Powerbirds" (instrumental)
- Composer: Ropey Sound
- Countries of origin: United States; Canada; Ireland
- Original language: English
- No. of seasons: 1
- No. of episodes: 20

Production
- Executive producers: Cathal Gaffney; Darragh O'Connell
- Producer: Uma Krishnamurthy
- Editors: Mark Edwards; Sam Smith; Andy Brittain
- Running time: 22 minutes
- Production companies: Brown Bag Films; JBMW Media

Original release
- Network: Universal Kids
- Release: 19 January – 5 November 2020

Powerbirds is an animated children's television series created by Stephen P. Breen and co-created by Jennifer Monier-Williams and produced by Brown Bag Films. The series is about Max and his pet parakeets who transform into superhero birds called the Powerbirds, after Max leaves for school. The Powerbirds save the city from danger, and will stop him against the animal friends who are villains.

The series premiered on 19 January 2020, on Universal Kids. It is one of the last shows to premiere on Universal Kids, before it was shut down on March 6, 2025. The series is currently seen in other languages. 20 episodes were produced.

== Premise ==
The series follows a boy named Max with his pair of parakeets, Ace and Polly. Max counts on them to keep saving the day while he is away. The powerbirds save the city from danger and they stop the villains: Nibbles the poodle, Clawdette the tabby cat, Scrapper the raccoon, Asher Stasher the flying squirrel and Minerva the owlet from the events where Max will be going later, so then later, Max is excited to visit the events.

== Cast and characters ==
=== Main ===
- Cory Doran as Ace, a determined, daring, and playful yellow parakeet who can turn into a superhero.
- Tara Strong as Polly, a silly and creative blue parakeet with stretching abilities. She tends to think outside of the box to solve problems.

=== Recurring ===
- Orlando Lucas as Max, an imaginative eight-year-old teenage boy who loves comic books and counts on Ace and Polly to make sure no danger is around the city when he is away.
- Ana Sani as Gwen, Max's little sister.
- Paloma Nuñez as Mrs. Lopez, a bookmobile driver.
- Deven Mack as Felix, Max's grandfather.

=== Antagonists ===
- Robert Tinkler as Nibbles, a selfish and greedy white poodle who seeks to become famous. However, he ends up causing disasters, mostly because he only thinks of himself.
- Evany Rosen as Clawdette, a tabby cat who is Max's pet, and the Powerbirds' adoptive sister. She believes that she is the best ninja, so she tries to get stuff so she can be the best at it.
- Tyler Murree as Scrapper, a raccoon who steals food from others. He speaks in a New York accent.
- Cory Doran as Asher Stasher, a flying squirrel who obsessively collects things.
- Shannon Hamilton as Minerva, a brown owl who uses different tools to cause trouble and make herself smarter than humans.

== Episodes ==
The series was picked up for 20 22-minute episodes. It premiered early on its original network for its first look of the show on 1 January 2020.

No.	Title	Written by	Storyboarded by	Original release date	Prod. code	U.S. viewers (millions)
1a	"World's Awesomest Villain"	S: Ben Joseph/T: Ben Joseph & Steve Westren	TBA	19 January 2020	102	N/A
Asher Stasher steals all the trophies in town.
1b	"Owl of Nod"	Heather Jackson	TBA	19 January 2020	102	N/A
Minerva ruins everyone's dreams.
2a	"That'll Teach 'Em"	S: Robin J. Stein/ T: Robin J. Stein & Steve Westren	TBA	21 January 2020	103	N/A
Minerva hypnotizes several teachers so she can be the smartest one on earth.
2b	"Space Odyssey"	Evan Thaler Hickey	TBA	21 January 2020	103	N/A
The powerbirds see an UFO in their yard one day.
3a	"Scrapperlicious"	Scott Albert	TBA	26 January 2020	104	N/A
The powerbirds chase Scrapper around town to get some pizzas.
3b	"Book Bedlam"	Robin J. Stein	TBA	26 January 2020	104	N/A
Minerva drives around Mrs Lopez's Bookmobile without knowing how to drive, so the Powerbirds must get the bookmobile back to safety.
4a	"Nibbles takes the Cake"	Steve Westren	TBA	2 February 2020	105	N/A
Nibbles ruins several birthdays by taking all the cakes.
4b	"Clash of the Critters"	Josh Saltzman	TBA	2 February 2020	105	N/A
Clawdette and Scrapper fight over a trash can.
5a	"Time to Dino-Soar"	S: Robin J. Stein/ T: Robin J. Stein & Steve Westren	Paul Gunson Antonella Maringola	9 February 2020	101	N/A
Nibbles ruins the grand opening of the dinosaur exhibit and throws a party there.
5b	"Birdy Guards"	Ben Joseph	TBA	9 February 2020	101	N/A
The powerbirds must protect a famous wrestler's belt before Asher Stasher and Clawdette take it.
6a	"Haywire Hayride"	S: Craig Martin; T:Craig Martin & Steve Westren	TBA	16 February 2020	106	N/A
Ace and Polly have to stop Nibbles, who's ruining the Harvest festival by taking over the hayride.
6b	"The Powerbirds Pretender"	Steve Westren	TBA	16 February 2020	106	N/A
Ace and Polly have to save the day and their reputations when Minerva poses as a fake Powerbird to make them look bad.
7a	"Power Meower Saves the Day"	Robin J. Stein	TBA	23 February 2020	107	N/A
Clawdette inadvertently sabotages Ace and Polly's attempts to stop Asher Stasher from collecting all the soccer balls in town.
7b	"Midnight Scrap"	Scott Albert	TBA	23 February 2020	107	N/A
Scrapper schemes to sneak into the house to take the cupcakes Max has baked for his classmates.
8a	"Wacky Wokka Walk"	S: Craig Martin; T: Craig Martin & Steve Westren	TBA	1 March 2020	108	N/A
Nibbles steals the finish line for the big race so that no one can win it.
8b	"Owl's Spoilers"	S: Ben Joseph; T: Ben Joseph & Steve Westren	TBA	1 March 2020	108	N/A
Ace and Polly team up against Minerva, who's stolen the last page out of every copy of Max's favorite comic book, Idaho Smith, so only she knows the ending.
9a	"Cement Your Legacy"	Ben Joseph	TBA	8 March 2020	109	N/A
Nibbles plans to write his name in some freshly poured cement so it will be there forever.
9b	"The Greatest Inventor"	S: Ben Joseph T: Ben Joseph & Steve Westren	TBA	8 March 2020	109	N/A
Minerva sneaks into the museum before it opens and switches all the plaques to make it seem like she invented everything.
10a	TBA	Steve Westren	TBA	15 March 2020	110	N/A
Minerva takes away everyone's ability to talk, while Polly learns that words aren't the only way to communicate.
10b	"Cereal Box Bandit"	Elliot Sokolsky	TBA	15 March 2020	110	N/A
Asher Stasher collects all the breakfast cereal in town while The Powerbirds' power belts have been damaged.
11a	"Clawdette Chaos!"	Elliot Sokolsky	TBA	17 June 2020	111	N/A
It's up to the Powerbirds to stop Clawdette, who's planning to ruin the big Kite Festival.
11b	"Food Caper"	Heather Jackson	TBA	17 June 2020	111	N/A
The Powerbirds and Clawdette team up to stop Scrapper.
12a	"Asher's Moving Castle"	Robin J. Stein	TBA	19 June 2020	112	N/A
Ace and Polly have to think things through when Asher Stasher steals the bouncy castle from the big block party.
12b	"Villain-Palooza"	Steve Westren	TBA	19 June 2020	112	N/A
All the villains team up to stop the Powerbirds once and for all.
13a	"Asher Goes Bananas"	Diana Moore	TBA	26 June 2020	113	N/A
Asher Stasher becomes obsessed with getting to the moon so he can put all of his extra collectibles in it.
13b	"Scrapper's Magnet Mayhem"	Ben Joseph	TBA	26 June 2020	113	N/A
Scrapper gets a hold of a really powerful magnet so he can take every item of canned food he can find, even in Max's food drive.
14a	"Clawdette's Mischievous Monkey"	Ben Joseph	TBA	3 July 2020	114	N/A
Ace and Polly are scared when Clawdette gets control of a toy monkey, when she lets it gets loose in town.
14b	"Take Back the Fort"	Evan Thaler Hickey	TBA	3 July 2020	114	N/A
The Powerbirds have to stop Scrapper, who's taken over Max's tree fort and using it for his very own villains' lair.
15a	"Major Mishap"	Andrew Harrison	TBA	10 July 2020	115	N/A
Asher hatches a plan to take all Major Justice action figures, so only he can have them.
15b	"King Wasteville"	Steve Westren	TBA	10 July 2020	115	N/A
Scrapper is launching mounds of waste into town trying to turn it into his own wasteful paradise.
16a	"Asher's Tooth Fairy Wish"	Ben Joseph	TBA	17 July 2020	116	N/A
Ace and Polly have to protect Max's tooth from Asher who wants to add it to his loose teeth collection.
16b	"Power Meower Strikes Again"	Josh Saltzman	TBA	17 July 2020	116	N/A
Gwen's stuffy, Boo Boo, is gone and she couldn't find it! While Max searches for it with her, Ace and Polly do their own searching with the unlikely help of Clawdette... or should we say: Power Meower.
17a	"Clawdette Who Cried Wolf"	Katherine Sandford	TBA	24 July 2020	117	N/A
17b	"Arf-Tastic Tales of Nibbles"	S: Ben Joseph & Steve Westren T: Steve Westren	TBA	24 July 2020	117	N/A
18a	"Doggoween"	Katherine Sandford	TBA	1 August 2020	118	N/A
18b	"Clash with Clawdette"	Diana Moore	TBA	1 August 2020	118	N/A
19a	"Asher's Eggstravaganza"	S: Josh Saltzman & Steve Westren; T: Steve Westren	TBA	8 August 2020	119	N/A
19b	"Big Balloon Afternoon"	S: Nate Knetchel & Steve Westren T: Steve Westren	TBA	8 August 2020	119	N/A
20a	"Clawdette's Christmas Caper"	Heather Jackson	TBA	5 November 2020	120	N/A
20b	"Hologram Hijinks"	Ben Joseph	TBA	5 November 2020	120	N/A

== Production ==
Universal Pictures chose to make a TV series out of Breen's children's books, which are published by Penguin, include Stick, Violet the Pilot, Pug and Doug, Unicorn Executions and Skyhorse, and the choice was Powerbirds. Universal Kids planned the series in 2017, but with a different style, before Sprout's rebrand to Universal Kids, a different style of the characters, which was Max, Polly, Ace and another character, the Golden Eagle.

9 Story Media Group's live-action and animation division co-produced the series with animators from Brown Bag Films.

== Reception ==
Universal Kids stated to Hollywood Life that "The series promotes underlying positive messages that we can all be our own superhero if we do the right thing."

== Release ==
In 2017, Universal Kids, as Sprout, set a release date for Powerbirds in 2019, but on December 11, 2019, the show was delayed to a 2020 release date instead to January 19, 2020, and the show got a first look release on January 1, 2020. The show will also air on Family Jr. in Canada.
