= Todd Kauffman =

Canadian television director

Todd Kauffman is a Canadian animator, character designer, and animation director, best known as a director of the animated television series Total Drama.

He was also a creator and director of the television series Sidekick, Grojband and Looped, an executive producer of Sidekick and Looped, and a character designer for Yin Yang Yo! and Bob and Margaret.

He has been a two-time Canadian Screen Awards nominee for Best Direction in an Animated Program or Series, receiving nods at the 9th Canadian Screen Awards in 2021 for True and the Rainbow Kingdom, and the 10th Canadian Screen Awards in 2022 for Pikwik Pack.
