= Pandalian =

Animated television series

- 魔豆奇伝パンダリアン
- Created by: TVbean
- Directed by: Hideaki Ohba
- Series composition: Hideki Sonoda
- Music by: Koichiro Kameyama
- Country of origin: Japan; Taiwan
- Original language: Japanese
- No. of episodes: 26
- Episodes

Production
- Studio: Studio Kuma
- TVbean; FCC; Planet

Original release
- Networks: Animax, Tokyo MX, BS Fuji
- Release: January 8 – July 9, 2005

Pandalian (魔豆奇伝パンダリアン, Madou Kiden Pandarian) (or PandaMonium) is a Japanese-Taiwanese animated television series produced by Studio Kuma, based on the characters created by Taiwanese company TVbean. It was directed by Hideaki Ohba with Hideki Sonoda handling series composition. The series first broadcast 19 December 2004 on TTV Main Channel. Its first Japanese broadcast started on Animax on 8 January 2005, followed by Tokyo MX in April 2005. Nelvana, with Funimation Productions as its North American partner licensed the series worldwide and premiered in Canada on YTV on 5 July 2006.

== Plot ==
It follows the story of a fairy named Mi who is sent to Planet Pandasia to warn the residents about a great evil that threatens to destroy Pandasia. She chooses a heroic panda named Toby to defeat King Audie and his minions, Gold and Silver, who want to collect the seven Beans of Power and rid Pandasia of its colourful, beautiful environment and replace it with a dark wasteland.

== Characters ==
Toby (voiced by Julie Lemieux in English) is a shy, clumsy, yet sweet panda, Toby is thrust into a world of adventure when he finds out that he's Pandasia's Chosen One, the Valor Bean Warrior, leader of the seven Pandalian Bean Warriors. The country boy became an employee of Bean TV, thanks to his friend Love, who he seems attracted to (and vice versa). Even though Cool dislikes him at first, Toby works hard to become his friend, and tries to accomplish his job: Saving Pandasia from King Audie and King Kulu!

- Didi (voiced by ?) is Toby's tiny yellow dinosaur friend.
- Yubby (voiced by Terry McGurrin) is a relative.
- Abby (voiced by Dwayne Hill) is a relative.

Mi (voiced by Stephanie Mills in English) is a precocious young fairy. At first, she hates being on Pandasia, and wants to go home, but as the series progresses, she likes being with the Pandalian Warriors, and even refuses to leave when her parents want her to. Her wand carries a magical book that holds all the information she needs, along with the Beans. She is very stubborn, and in the beginning, has a disliking for Cool.

- King Panno (voiced by Bill Colgate in English) is Mi's dad
- Queen Laila (voiced by ?) is Mi's mom

Cool (voiced by Lyon Smith in English) is an arrogant, self-centered panda, who cares only about himself (and Love). Cool has a great disliking for Toby, and sees him as competition for Love's affection, until Cool finally accepts Toby as his friend. He built his own battle robot, the Pandabot, and his own car, the Coolmobile. In the episode "The Danger Down Deep", Cool is affected by the Desira-Bean. When he falls off a cliff into the sea, his friends think he is dead, when he is really a captive of King Audie. The Desira-Bean transforms him into King Kulu, who takes control of Audie's castle and his minions, turning Audie into a miniature toddler. After his friends find out he is alive, they fight Kulu, trying to save him. Mi finds out about Cool's transformation and tells the others. Cool is then turned back to normal. He is, at first, the Desira-Bean Warrior, but at the end of the show, it is revealed that, he too is the warrior of the Valor-Bean.

Love (also known as Anastasia) is the daughter of Bean TV's owner. She is a very kind young panda, who always cares about others. Though she always seems like a damsel in distress, she is really the warrior of the Adora-Bean. Her compassion towards others makes her a natural when it comes to saving the day. Love has been friends with Cool for a long time, but she didn't seem to return his infatuation with her, and she appeared to have a crush on Toby.

Oscar (voiced by Jamie Watson in English) is the main reporter from Bean TV. He is obsessed with getting the scoop of the century, and will do anything to find it. He likes to put on his special suit and become Panda Hero, and he is the warrior of the Plasma-Bean. Oscar saved Max when they were children. Oscar thinks Bingo and Congo are lazy and self-centered at first, but becomes friends with the twins, and even falls in love with Bingo, who brought out his sensitive side. When she was frozen, Oscar even cried, and was determined to save her.

- Max (voiced by Terry McGurrin in English) is Oscar's food obsessed camera man. When he and Oscar were children, Oscar found him floating in the sea, and saved his life. Max forgot where he came from, and became Oscar's best friend. Later on in the series, Max finds out that he was born on the center island where Yani lives. Max is also the warrior of the Yum Yum-Bean, and is the strongest member of the team, along with Congo.

Yani: Yani is a little fairy who looks like a toddler. She floats around in a pink bubble, and is the tribe leader of the center island, where Max was born. She is hurt by pollution and destruction of the center island forest, which made her bubble turn dark. In the final episode, the Wisdom Tree in the center of the planet died, and Yani's bubble faded, and she collapsed, nearly dying. When the tree was healed, Yani's bubble reappeared, and she woke up. Yani is the warrior of the Zen-Bean, and always has to talk sense into Oscar.

Bingo: (voiced by Susan Roman in English) Bingo is a small but tough little panda, who will always fight her way out of a situation. She is an experienced athlete, and cares for her twin brother Congo. She also has feelings for Oscar, which she'll rarely admit. Bingo is a warrior of the Powerup-Bean, along with Congo. In the episode "Panda's On Ice", Bingo is frozen solid after pushing Congo out of the way of a cursed icicle. As she froze, she calmly told her friends to not touch the ice. She told Oscar to be careful, and to take care of Congo, which shows her growing friendship with the other warriors. Bingo and Oscar came close to kissing in the episode "What Lies Bean-neath".

Congo: Congo is Bingo's twin brother, though he is much larger and older than her. He is the Powerup-Bean warrior, along with his sister. He cares very much about her, and will fight anybody to protect her. Congo will often carry her around. He is an experienced athlete, and doesn't trust the other warriors in the beginning.

King Audie (voiced in English by Bill Colgate) is the evil king trying to destroy Pandasia. He lives in the Dark Castle, and uses the Desira-Bean to assist him. He created Galoo. When Cool became King Kulu, Audie was turned into a miniature toddler by him. In the last episode, he returned, but was finally killed by Toby and Cool.

Galoo (voiced in English by Peter Cugno) is an evil pterodactyl/bat monster that King Audie made out of clay. He is the smartest of King Audie's minions, and is often attacking the Bean Warriors and tormenting Gold and Silver. Since he was made out of clay, the King Audie/Plant Monster ate him to gain energy.

Gold (voiced in English by Dwayne Hill) and Silver (voiced in English by Jamie Watson) are King Audie's other two minions. They are brothers, who often mess up. They are both generally cowards, and joined the good side later in the final episodes. Gold is tough and masculine, while his brother Silver is often girly.

King Kulu The Evil Motocross Super Funk of the Universe.

== Theme song ==
Opening theme: 楽しいこと考えよう
Lyrics / Composition / Song - EPO
Arrangement - 野見祐二
Ending theme: Friends
Lyrics / Composition / Song - EPO
Arrangement - LONESOME STRINGS

== Episodes ==
The Japanese broadcasts ran from 8 January 2005 to 9 July 2005.

| No. | Title | Original release date |
|---|---|---|
| 1 | "Panda Go-Go" | July 5, 2006 |
Mi is sent to save the planet Pandasia from King Audie's wrath, but is inconvenienced by Didi. Didi is taken hostage by Gold and Silver.
| 2 | "Who Da Panda? He Da Panda!" | July 12, 2006 |
After a cliffhanging with Gold and Silver, Toby and Didi fall into the river, but are rescued by Mi.
| 3 | "Big City Panda" | July 19, 2006 |
Mi tries to convince Toby, that he is destined to help save the Pandasia, but Toby wants to work for Bean TV instead.
| 4 | "The Big Bug Breakout" | July 26, 2006 |
Gold and Silver unleash the dark powers of the Desira Bean in the town, but Toby is able to quell it with the Valor Bean.
| 5 | "The Applicant" | August 2, 2006 |
Toby does racing events to apply for work at Bean TV. With Gold and Silver in the way, Toby helps Cool reach the finish line.
| 6 | "Scoop of the Century" | August 9, 2006 |
While Toby and Cool look for a great news scoop, Gold and Silver unleash another Desira Bean swarm, but Toby with Cool's help vanquishes it.
| 7 | "A Hero Among Us" | August 16, 2006 |
Gold and Silver's premature use of yet another Desira Bean, puts Toby's family in danger. With Oscar and his crew's help, Toby saves his family.
| 8 | "Size Me Up!" | August 23, 2006 |
An unsuspecting Desira Bean monster turns Max into an eating machine. Swallowed by Max, Toby and Oscar do battle with the Deelbug and restore Max.
| 9 | "The Danger Down Deep" | August 30, 2006 |
Toby and his friends, followed by Gold and Silver, go to Bean Island. They are met by people cursed by King Audie, then escape from Arloo.
| 10 | "Down, Up and Out" | September 6, 2006 |
After the curse of the Bean Island people is undone, Cool is being affected by a Desira Bean and becoming evil.
| 11 | "Pandemonium in Pandasia!" | September 13, 2006 |
Cool becomes corrupted and as King Kulu, takes over King Audie and ravages Pandasia until Toby drives him away.
| 12 | "Big Fish" | September 20, 2006 |
King Kulu controls a giant fish pursued by Bingo and Congo. Mi discovers the Powerup Bean and that Congo is its warrior, then Oscar comes to everyone's rescue.
| 13 | "Beyond the Sea" | September 27, 2006 |
Toby's group come across a strange tree, which tasks Toby to find the righteous mushroom. They are joined by a new fairy companion named Yani. Toby is able to pass the test and save the local pandas.
| 14 | "If a Tree Falls in the Forest" | October 4, 2006 |
Toby's group looks around the forest for Max's missing father, who has been turned evil by King Kulu. They are able to purge the evil from him and save the Zen Bean.
| 15 | "20, 000 Fans Under The Sea" | October 11, 2006 |
Yani brings Toby's group to an underwater city and play a Paw Ball game against Bingo and Congo plus Gold and Silver, which is rigged by Galoo.
| 16 | "Tournament Fever" | October 18, 2006 |
Toby's group is challenged in a tournament by Bingo and Congo. Just as Toby declares a truce with Congo, Galoo sends a monster, but Bingo and Congo combined as one Powerup creature and Toby destroy it.
| 17 | "Showdown In Chowville" | October 27, 2006 |
In the ravaged town of Chowville, Toby's group find the prince of Chowville, who has the Yum-yum bean and Max is the bearer of it. While Toby regroups with Bingo and Congo, the others are cornered by King Kulu.
| 18 | "Reversal Of Fortune Cookie" | November 1, 2006 |
Bingo and Congo infiltrate the Chowville Castle ballroom to rescue Toby's friends, while Toby rescues the castle prisoners. Assisted by Bingo and Congo, Toby destroys King Kulu's pandabot.
| 19 | "Pandas On Ice" | November 8, 2006 |
Down in the Valley of Ice, Toby's group plunge into a cavern. Bingo is frozen solid having saved Congo from this fate. Beyond a town, they break into an ice castle and set off to find the Dark bean.
| 20 | "Nice Ice, Panda" | November 15, 2006 |
While in the castle, the pack encounter a monster that drives them out, all the while taking Toby prisoner. While the others plot to lift the curse Toby meets the queen and finds the bean that's causing the deep-freeze.
| 21 | "The Big Recap Show" | November 22, 2006 |
Mi's parents wish her to return home. Feeling unwanted, Mi flies away, but Toby reconciles with her. Toby and Fifi are then rescued from a rushing river.
| 22 | "What lies Bean-Neath" | November 29, 2006 |
Gold and Silver break Love's box, which unleashes the powers of the Dark Bean, which affects Didi especially. After much effort Love purifies Didi and recovers the Adora Bean.
| 23 | "Not So Cool" | March 7, 2007 |
Toby and his friends come across Flower Country Amusement Park. Cool comes to them seemingly free, but he turns out to be King Kulu in disguise and takes Mi and Love away.
| 24 | "King Kulu The Uncool!" | March 8, 2007 |
Toby and his friends head for the Dark Castle. They look for a way to enter the castle, battling King Kulu's forces, until Toby alone defeats a monstrous Gold and confronts King Kulu.
| 25 | "Fire In The Sky" | March 9, 2007 |
King Kulu overwhelms Toby, but with renewed vigor Toby turns into a phoenix and repels King Kulu's evil shadows. Toby and Love finally release Cool from the Desira Bean's power, but King Audie gets his power back.
| 26 | "Has Bean" | March 10, 2007 |
Cool's renewed selflessness grants him the power of the Valor Bean. A combined effort from Toby and Cool devastates King Audie. Toby finishes off King Audie, by uniting the seven beans and lifting the darkness from Pandasia for good.

== Cast ==
| Character | English version | Japanese version | Spanish Version |
|---|---|---|---|
| Toby | Julie Lemieux | Yumiko Kobayashi | Memo Aponte |
| Mi | Stephanie Anne Mills | | |
| Love | | Akiko Kawase | |
| Cool | Lyon Smith | Romi Park | Edson Matus |
| King Audie | Bill Colgate | Nishimura Tomomichi | |
| Gold | Dwayne Hill | Wataru Takagi | |
| Silver | Jamie Watson | Nagasako Takashi | Humberto Velez |
| Oscar | Jamie Watson | Takurou Nakakuni | José Antonio Macías |
| Max | Terry McGurrin | Takashi Nagasako | |
| Galoo | Peter Cagno | Shibata Hidekatsu | |
| Panno | Bill Colgate | Wataru Takagi | |
| Abby | Dwayne Hill | Yu Kobayashi | |
| Yubby | Terry McGurrin | Higa Kumiko | |
| Bingo | Susan Roman | | Patricia Acevedo |

== Promotions ==
22 November 2004 the Taiwan Post Office released 3500 stamps based on the television show.

From 13 December 2004 to 30 January 2005, TTV hosted 7 prized quiz games, with prizes given to winners correctly answering all 15 questions within 30 seconds. A second series of quiz games were held from 11 July to 8 August during 2005.

TVbean held a lucky draw of 200 museum tickets from 23 September to 5 October during 2005.

== Novels ==
Novel version of Pandalian was authored by Mami Watanabe, published by JIVE in June 2005.
