= Saban Capital Group =

Entertainment investment company owned by Haim Saban

Saban Capital Group LLC
- Type: Private
- Industry: Private equity; Entertainment; Media; Merchandising; Communications
- Predecessor: Saban Entertainment
- Founded: October 24, 2001; 25 years ago
- Founder: Haim Saban
- Headquarters: Los Angeles, California, U.S. Jerusalem
- Area served: Worldwide
- Key people: Haim Saban (Chairman & CEO); Ness Saban (Deputy CEO); Adam Chesnoff (President & COO)
- Products: Films; Mass media; Television shows; Consumer products
- Divisions: Saban Ventures; Saban Films; Saban Music Group
- Subsidiaries: Saban Real Estate LLC.; TelevisaUnivision (20%); Celestial Tiger Entertainment
- Website: www.saban.com

Saban Capital Group LLC is an American investment company based in Los Angeles, California focused on media, entertainment and communications. Formed on October 24, 2001 by Haim Saban, Saban Capital Group owns Saban Films and co-owns Celestial Tiger Entertainment.

== History ==
In October 2006, SCG's Saban Entertainment Group division announced the beginning of its virtual studio program for starting up and developing family entertainment. In March 2007, Univision Communications was sold to Broadcasting Media Partners which includes Saban Capital Group, Madison Dearborn Partners, Providence Equity Partners, TPG Capital, and Thomas H. Lee Partners. On October 17, 2011, Saban Capital Group acquired 7.5% stake in Jakarta-based Indonesian largest integrated media company, Media Nusantara Citra. In July 2012, Saban Capital Group acquired minority stake in PT MNC Sky Vision Tbk, the largest pay-TV operator in Indonesia which owns Indovision and Top TV. In June 2012, Kidsco Media Ventures LLC, a SCG affiliate, jointly with Konami's 4K Acquisition Corp. purchased some of the key assets of 4Kids Entertainment with Kidsco getting the Dragon Ball Z Kai, Cubix, Sonic X and The CW Network's Saturday Morning programming block contract rights. In August 2012, Saban Capital Group launched a new music publishing division called "Music Ventures".

On September 13, 2018, Saban Capital Acquisition Corp. announced the purchase of Panavision and Sim Video International in a $622 million cash and stock deal. The transaction was aimed at creating a comprehensive production and post-production entity. Saban Capital Acquisition Corp. proposed a change of name to Panavision Holdings Inc., but expected to continue to trade on the Nasdaq stock exchange. Saban ended up terminating its deal to acquire Panavision on March 1, 2019.

== Saban Entertainment Group ==
=== Libraries ===
- Hollywood Star Dogs
- Cirque du Soleil Media
- CNCO
- Emojiville
- La Banda
- Macbeth Footwear
- Mambo Graphics
- MIX5
- Paul Frank
- Piping Hot

== Saban Brands ==
On May 5, 2010, Saban Capital Group announced that it would start Saban Brands (SB), a successor company to Saban Entertainment (later known as BVS Entertainment) dedicated to acquiring entertainment and consumer brands. On May 12 the same year, 2010, Saban Brands bought back the Power Rangers franchise and some of its some related shows from the Walt Disney Company for $43 million and would produce a new nineteenth season of Power Rangers that began airing on Nickelodeon on February 7, 2011, with the previous 700 episodes being rerun on Nicktoons.

In February 2018, Saban Brands appointed Hasbro as the global master toy license for Power Rangers beginning in April 2019 with a future option to purchase the franchise. On May 1, 2018, Saban agreed to sell Power Rangers and other entertainment assets to Hasbro for US$522 million in cash and stock, with the sale expected to close in the second quarter. Other properties in the deal included My Pet Monster, Popples, Julius Jr., Luna Petunia, Treehouse Detectives and Saban Brands' content/media libraries (excluding Rainbow Butterfly Unicorn Kitty, Sonic X and other properties that were sold to different companies before the deal). Saban's Digimon and Pretty Cure licenses were also transferred to Hasbro, although were later left to expire, thus reverting to Toei Animation Inc. for its international distribution. Only nine existing employees out of sixty would be retained by SCG, and the Saban Brands subsidiary ended operations upon the closure of business on July 2, 2018.

== Saban Films ==
On May 6, 2014, ahead of that year's Cannes Film Festival, Saban announced the launch of an acquisitions label named Saban Films to acquire yearly 8 to 10 feature films for the North American market.

== Units ==
- Saban Entertainment Group
- Saban Kids & Family
- Saban Films
- Saban Real Estate, LLC

== Investments ==
=== Current ===
- Celestial Tiger Entertainment (CTE) (JV)
- Qoo10
- Taomee (minority stake)
- Playbuzz (2016)
- Bustle
- IronSource
- Sim Video International

=== Past ===
- Bezeq
- Keshet Broadcasting LTD
- Panavision
- ProSiebenSat.1 Media AG
- Vessel
- Broadcasting Media Partners (20%)
  - Univision Communications, Inc.
- Media Nusantara Citra (MNC) (7.5%)

== Political activities ==
The Saban Group is a top contributor to the Democratic Party. It has donated to former President Barack Obama's campaign and was one of the top donors of the Clinton Campaign of 2016 with a contribution of approximately $12 million.
