= Cory Doran =

Canadian voice actor and director (born 1982)

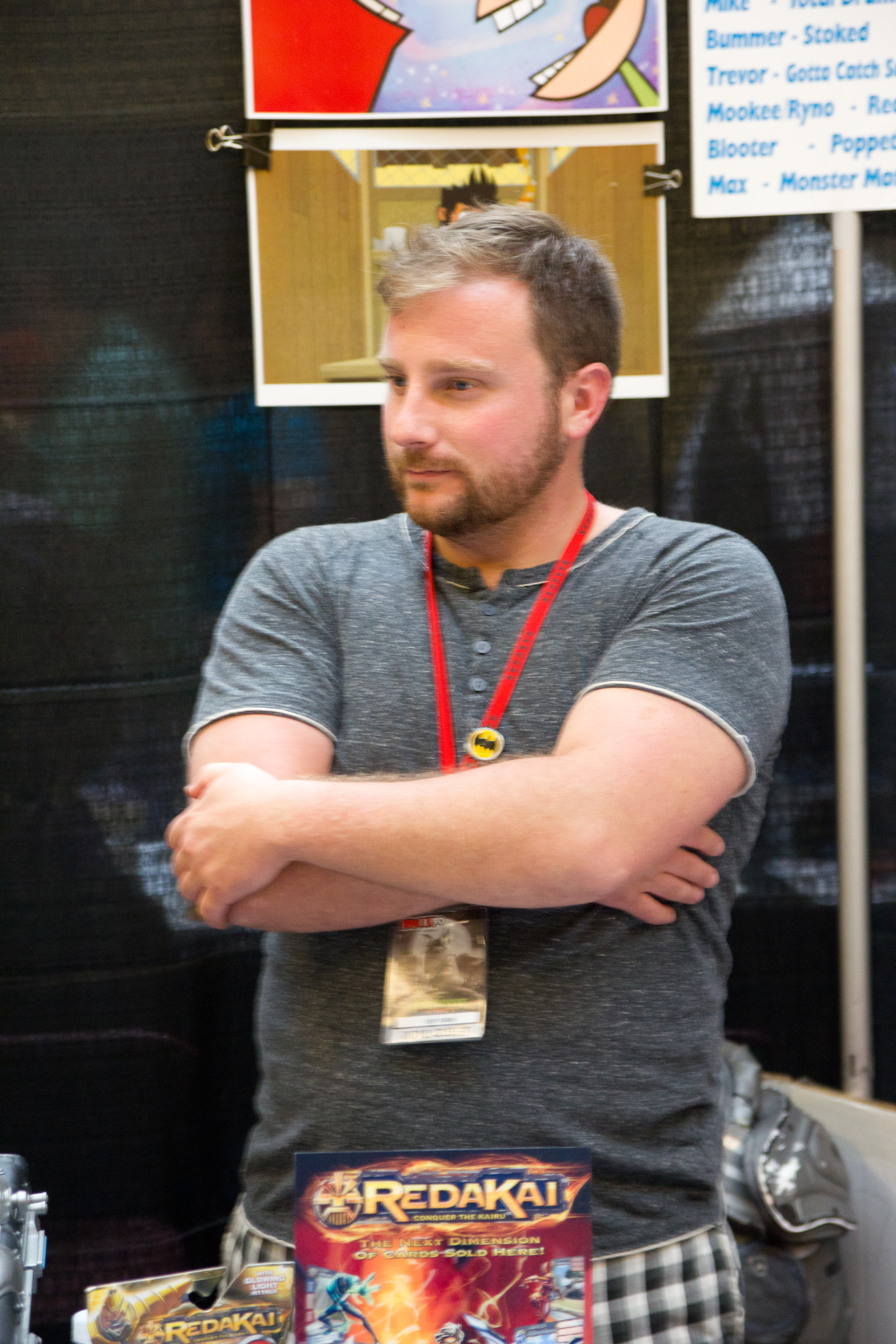
- Doran at the 2012 Fan Expo Canada
- Born: February 7, 1982 (age 44); Toronto, Ontario, Canada
- Other name: Corey Doran
- Occupations: Voice actor, director
- Years active: 2006–present
- Notable work: Jimmy Two-Shoes as Jimmy; Total Drama as Mike; Powerbirds as Ace

Cory Doran (born February 7, 1982) is a Canadian voice actor and director. He is known as the voice of Dabio & Rex in the PBS Kids animated series Wild Kratts, Jimmy in the Breakthrough Entertainment animated show Jimmy Two-Shoes, and Mike in the Total Drama series.

He took over for Lou Attia as the voice of Fungus in the second season of the YTV/Cartoon Network animated television series, Numb Chucks, and also provides the voice of Bummer in the Teletoon/Cartoon Network series Stoked, and Ace in the Universal Kids animated series Powerbirds. Since 2015, he has been the voice of FX, and from 2015 to 2025, he was the voice of WildBrainTV.

== Filmography ==
=== Animation ===
- Jimmy Two-Shoes – Jimmy Two-Shoes
- Rocket Monkeys – Flowers
- Stoked – Andrew "Bummer" Baumer, No Pants Lance and Captain Ron
- Total Drama – Mike and his alters (Chester, Svetlana, Vito, Manitoba Smith, Mal "the Malevolent One")
- Skatoony – Jimmy Two-Shoes, Mike and his alters (Chester, Svetlana, Vito)
- Fugget About It – Donnie, Mr. Flip
- Gotta Catch Santa Claus (2008) – Trevor Taylor II
- Numb Chucks (2015–16) – Fungus
- Transformers: BotBots – Fomo and Wishy-Waffley
- George of the Jungle (2016–17) – George, Tookie Tookie
- BeyWheelz – Tom (English dub)
- BeyWarriors: BeyRaiderz – Domani (English dub)
- Lego Friends Heartlake Stories: Wet Wallop – Chet (Only once)
- Freaktown – Lenny
- Now You See Me 2 – Security Guard's Henchmen (Uncredited)
- Fangbone! – Kael, Skeletom, Hound
- Poppets Town – Blooter
- Powerbirds – Ace and Asher Stasher
- Monster Math Squad – Max
- Mysticons – Neeko, Lance O'Lovely
- Luna Petunia – Sammy Stretch
- Total DramaRama – Noah
- Wild Kratts – Dabio, Shabio, Rex, Kenny
- Ollie's Pack – Captain Wowski
- Bakugan Battle Planet – Nillious, various additional characters (English dub)
- Glowbies – Randy
- Thomas & Friends: All Engines Go – Cranky, Brown Troublesome Truck (US), Ultratrain, Trainiac (US/UK; 2021)
- Thomas & Friends: Race for the Sodor Cup – Cranky, Brown Troublesome Truck (US)
- Rubble & Crew – Speed Meister, Mr. McTurtle, Mega Meister, Mr. McHippo
- My Little Pony: Make Your Mark – Comet
- Super Wish - Balloonicus
- Super Team Canada - Satan
