= Freaktown =

- Also known as: Freak vs. Sweet
- Genre: Comedy horror
- Created by: Peter Ricq; Philippe Ivanusic-Vallée
- Directed by: Chris LaBonte; Peter Ricq
- Voices of: Landon Norris; Cory Doran; Stephanie Lynn Robinson; Julie Lemieux; Richard Binsley; Matt Baram; Jamie Watson
- Composers: For Pirate Toronto: Ian LeFeuvre
- Country of origin: Canada
- Original language: English
- No. of seasons: 1
- No. of episodes: 26

Production
- Executive producers: For Portfolio Entertainment: Lisa Olfman and Joy Rosen
- Producer: Dave Beatty
- Running time: 22 minutes
- Production company: Portfolio Entertainment

Original release
- Network: Teletoon
- Release: June 20 – October 9, 2016

Freaktown is a Canadian animated series produced by Portfolio Entertainment, being the first creation of the group's cartoon studio. Devised by Peter Ricq and Philippe Ivanusic, the series premiered on Teletoon on June 20, 2016. Internationally, the series premiered on Disney XD in Southeast Asia on May 28 and 29, 2016 and also aired on Pop Max in the United Kingdom, Boing in France, Hungama TV and Disney XD in India, and Cartoon Network in Australia and New Zealand.

== Plot ==
The series focuses on Ben Bones, an undead skeleton and Lenny, an anthropomorphic mantis. They are to protect their Freaktown against a massive makeover of the cute and cuddly kind, courtesy of Princess Boo Boo, the spoiled brat ruler of Sweetlandia and her right-hand bear, Lord Cuddles the Fluffy.

== Characters ==
=== Main ===
- Benjamin Andy "Ben" Bones (voiced by Landon Norris) – The kind, friendly and mischievous problem-solving protagonist of the show and hero of Freaktown. Ben is an undead skeleton with a soul. He often foils Princess Boo Boo and Lord Cuddles' plans to "sugar frost" Freaktown.
- Lenny (voiced by Cory Doran) – Ben's best friend. Lenny is a mutant mantis, who is sometimes shy, but also very endearing. He has the ability to shoot sticky webs.
- Priscilla (voiced by Stephanie Lynn Robinson) – Ben and Lenny's friend who works at a Grossery Store in Freaktown. Priscilla is a stitched up ghoul who can take out her eyeballs and is good at concocting magic potions and is often a source of advice and information for Ben and Lenny.
- Princess Boo Boo (voiced by Julie Lemieux) – One of the main antagonists. She is the ruler of Sweetlandia. She is a spoiled brat who plans to turn Freaktown into a kind and cuddly paradise.
- Lord Cuddles the Fluffy (voiced by Matt Baram) – Another main antagonist. He is a dwarf-sized squeaky toy teddy bear. He is Princess Boo Boo's right-hand bear and Freaktown's mayor. He is the one who normally plans the scheme to ruin Freaktown.

=== Minor ===
- Taylor (voiced by Jamie Watson) – a tough and muscular Unicorn who works as a bodyguard for both Boo Boo and Cuddles.
- Sparkles (voiced by Richard Binsley) – a Wizard who often helps Princess Boo Boo and is Cuddles's rival.
- Wereshark (voiced by Lawrence Bayne) – a shark and werewolf hybrid who looks seemingly menacing but has a nice and friendly personality and had a very powerful bite.
- Jeffreak – a monster that sells barfritos and has operates a food truck and restaurant.
- B-1000 – a robot designed to lookslike Ben and replace him.
- Chad – a Cupid that Princess Boo Boo ordered to shoot its arrow at Ben but accidentally shoots at other citizens of Freaktown.
- Zoe – Priscilla's baby niece.
- Gary – a fish monster who's a worker of Grossery Store.
- Fluffies – a group of anthropomorphic cottons that are shaped like a rectangle, square, and triangle (sometimes upside down triangle and right side up triangle) who often guards Cuddles's castle, and communicates in the language "Snatter Chatter".
- Roy – a small blue dragon that Ben always brought just in case.
- Tony Blaugerschmidt – a purple four-legged goblin-like monster with pointy ears who couldn't care less about anything and seems to dislike Ben and Lenny.

== Episodes ==
No.	Title	Written by	Storyboarded by	Original release date	Prod. code	U.S. viewers (millions)
1a	"Flush Fest"	Steve Westren	Chris LaBonte	June 20, 2016	001	N/A
Princess Boo-Boo tells Cuddles to cancel Freaktown's annual Flush Fest.
1b	"The Princess and the Skull"	Philippe Ivanusic-Vallée	Dave Pemberton	June 20, 2016	001	N/A
Sparkles conjures up a spell that gives Boo-Boo the power to transform Ben into a prince.
2a	"Tinkle Taylor, Soldier, Spy" "Tinker Taylor Soldier Spy"	Steve Westren	Troy Sullivan	June 27, 2016	004	N/A
Priscilla sends Ben and Lenny on a quest.
2b	"Nap Trap"	Scott Albert	Todd Sullivan	June 27, 2016	AABF001	N/A
Ben's noisiness interferes with Boo-Boo's nap time. So, Cuddles creates a giant mobile that threatens to put all the Freaks to sleep.
3a	"The Tale of Buttsilk"	Hollis Ludlow-Carroll	Todd Sullivan	July 4, 2016	AABF002	N/A
Ben and Lenny discover that Lenny's butt silk transforms Freaks into cute butterflies.
3b	"Slumberdome"	Miles Smith	Dave Pemberton	July 4, 2016	AABF003	N/A
Ben wants to win the annual Pillow-Fighting championship. So, Priscilla outfits him with an undefeatable bionic arm.
4a	"B-1000"	Miles Smith	Stephanie Ramon Drew Ng	July 11, 2016	AABF005	N/A
Cuddles builds a Ben robot, hoping to replace the real Ben.
4b	"Lord Cuddles the Zitty"	Philippe Ivanusic-Vallée	Troy Sullivan	July 11, 2016	AABF006	N/A
Priscilla creates a potion to make Mayor Cuddles more attractive to Boo-Boo.
5a	"Build-a-Ben"	Scott Albert	Dave Pemberton	July 18, 2016	AABF007	N/A
Sparkles sucks the stuffing out of Cuddles in order to make a living Ben doll for Boo-Boo. The doll turns out to awkwardly control Ben like a voodoo doll.
5b	"Ben's Bones"	Hollis Ludlow-Carroll	Rod Amador	July 18, 2016	BBBF001	N/A
Ben loses his bone after another stunt.
6a	"Ben's Buff Bod"	Hollis Ludlow-Carroll	Todd Sullivan	July 25, 2016	BBBF002	N/A
Ben breaks every bone in his body while trying a stunt and Lenny finds him a temporary replacement body.
6b	"Dare Ya"	Philippe Ivanusic-Vallée	Troy Sullivan	July 25, 2016	BBBF004	N/A
The Freaks show Cuddles the joys of daring a person.
7a	"Cupid Crisis"	Ashley Lannigan	Dave Pemberton	August 1, 2016	BBBF005	N/A
Boo-Boo hires a thoroughly incompetent cupid.
7b	"Date with Danger"	Craig Martin	Paul Bouchard	August 1, 2016	BBF008	N/A
Hit-man needs to shoot Ben with an arrow and make him fall in love with her; the hit-man manages to hit everybody but Ben.
8a	"Funny Bone"	Hollis Ludrow-Carroll	Dave Pemberton	August 8, 2016	CCBF001	N/A
Ben loses his funny bone during a roller coaster ride before a big competition that will give him and Lenny their cash for the year. Lenny then tells Priscilla that Ben wins by his charming personality, not by the stunt.
8b	"Pool Party Pooper"	Phil Ivanusic-Vallée	Troy Sullivan	August 8, 2016	CCBF002	N/A
It's a hot day in Freaktown, and everyone is burning, so Ben and his friends decide to sneak into Princess Boo-Boo's new water park.
9a	"Dream to Scream"	Ethan Banville	Paul Bouchard	August 15, 2016	CCBF004	N/A
9b	"The Fluff Stuff"	Steve Westren	Todd Sullivan	August 15, 2016	CCBF006	N/A
Mayor Cuddles loses his stuffing and does not want the princess to see him.
10a	"Senior's Discount"	Hollis Ludlow-Carroll	Dave Pemberton	August 22, 2016	CCBF008	N/A
Wanting to bag a senior's discount at the Barf Bistro, Ben and Lenny get Priscilla to create a potion that will make them temporarily old, but they take too much of it.
10b	"Infurnace"	Miles Smith	Troy Sullivan	August 22, 2016	CCBF010	N/A
11a	"Baby-Sitter Ben"	Phil Ivanusic-Vallée	Paul Bouchard	August 27, 2016	EABF001	N/A
Ben and Lenny have to babysit Priscilla's niece, Zoe, but they send her to an automated babysitting service.
11b	"Barfrrritos"	Hollis Ludlow-Carroll	Todd Sullivan	August 27, 2016	EABF002	N/A
After realizing that he is the only one who isn't on a restaurant wall of fame, Ben tries to break a burrito-eating record.
12a	"Plant a Freak"	Scott Albert	Dave Pemberton	August 27, 2016	EABF003	N/A
In exchange for primo tickets to the Monster Truck rally, Ben and Lenny agree to tend to the neglected garden at Boo-Boo's castle.
12b	"Magic School"	Ashley Lannigan	Dave Pemberton	August 27, 2016	EABF005	N/A
13a	"The Wishing Rat"	Craig Martin	Troy Sullivan	August 27, 2016	EABF009	N/A
The guys learn there's a mystical rat in the sewer that will grant three wishes; a series of dangerous challenges must be met to find the rat.
13b	"Raining Cats & Cats"	Andrew Harrison	Paul Bouchard	August 27, 2016	EABF010	N/A
14a	"Freaks in Space"	Scott Albert	Todd Sullivan	October 1, 2016	FFBF001	N/A
14b	"Glitter Goo"	Phil Ivanusic-Vallée	Dave Pemberton	October 1, 2016	FFBF002	N/A
15a	"Moosequito Day"	Scott Albert	Troy Sullivan	October 1, 2016	FFBF004	N/A
Mayor Cuddles frightens the shutdown of a holiday for a half-mosquito, half-moose creature who has a great thrust for blood because he thinks it's not real, but Lenny says that he was right because his forefather mistook the creature for a Freak.
15b	"The Snozz"	Ashley Lannigan	Todd Sullivan	October 1, 2016	FFBF005	N/A
The Freaks are demanding to take naps for a long period of time, but Ben and the others rebel against it, so Cuddles orders a machine to make them sleep.
16a	"Bed Monster"	Hollis Ludlow-Carroll	Dave Pemberton	October 1, 2016	FFBF009	N/A
16b	"Princess Bloorgh-Bloorgh"	Mike Kubat	Rod Amador	October 1, 2016	IABF001	N/A
The princess beauty treatment goes haywire and Boo-Boo ends up looking like an alien. She then lands in the swamp where Ben and Lenny are alien hunting.
17a	"Sneezy Peasy"	Phil Ivanusic-Vallée	Paul Bouchard	October 1, 2016	IABF001	N/A
17b	"Boo-Boo's Breakdown"	Steve Senders	Todd Sullivan	October 1, 2016	IABF004	N/A
18a	"Chrysalenny"	Andrew Harrison	Dave Pemberton	October 1, 2016	IABF005	N/A
After betting with Cuddles, Ben has to do a race by himself while Lenny is in a cocoon and win or they will have to leave Freaktown forever.
18b	"Fountain of Freak"	Hollis Ludlow-Carroll	Troy Sullivan	October 1, 2016	IABF014	N/A
Ben accidentally falls into a fountain that makes him human. Soon after, he wants to go back to normal, but then the fountain is revealed to have a guardian who won't allow him to get through.
19a	"Sunshineopolypse"	Hollis Ludlow-Carroll	Paul Bouchard	October 8, 2016	KOBF001	N/A
19b	"Horn to be Shorn"	Brian Hartigan	Todd Sullivan	October 8, 2016	KOBF002	N/A
20a	"Scarego"	Miles Smith	Troy Sullivan	October 8, 2016	KOBF003	N/A
20b	"The Bees-ness"	Scott Albert	Dave Pemberton	October 8, 2016	KOBF004	N/A
21a	"Conquer With Kindness"	Miles Smith	Jun Nasayao	October 8, 2016	KOBF005	N/A
21b	"The Sweet Outdoors"	Miles Smith	Todd Sullivan	October 8, 2016	KOBF007	N/A
22a	"Air Sweet"	Scott Albert	Troy Sullivan	October 9, 2016	KOBF010	N/A
Ben is invited to a skydiving lesson and Lenny tags along only to reveal that Princess Boo-Boo tricked him into going on a vacation, but they end up on a mountain top after Boo-Boo crashes the plane while trying to pull Ben in after he jumps.
22b	"Mind Over Chatter"	Hollis Ludlow-Carroll	Dave Pemberton	October 9, 2016	LABF001	N/A
It's prank day, and the gang wants to pull the ultimate prank on Cuddles by making him wear a helmet to broadcast his thoughts; Ben ends up wearing it instead.
23a	"Boo-Boo's New Crush"	Scott Albert	Jun Nasayao	October 9, 2016	LABF002	N/A
23b	"Fright Light"	Ashley Lannigan	Troy Sullivan	October 9, 2016	LABF004	N/A
24a	"Sven and Kenny"	Hollis Ludlow-Carroll	Dave Pemberton	October 9, 2016	LABF009	N/A
24b	"Biker Bones"	Hollis Ludlow-Carroll	Todd Sullivan	October 9, 2016	LABF012	N/A
25a	"The Weather Ghoul"	Hollis Ludlow-Carroll	Jun Nasayao	October 9, 2016	LABF014	N/A
Priscilla's ability to predict the weather spreads all over the town and when she's asked to do the weather reports, Ben and Lenny are put in charge of the store.
25b	"Tooth Ninjas"	Scott Albert	Todd Sullivan	October 9, 2016	NABF001	N/A
Chad the cupid takes a part-time job as the tooth fairy. After he complains about the tooth shortage, Ben and Lenny decide to him in return for money to buy a wart hog.
26a	"Toe Jam Jam"	Steve Westren	Dave Pemberton	October 9, 2016	NABF002	N/A
26b	"Bistro Blitz"	Philippe Ivanusic-Vallée	Dave Pemberton	October 9, 2016	NABF003	N/A

== Broadcast and release ==
The series premiered on Cartoon Network in multiple nations, including Australia, Japan, Korea, New Zealand, and Taiwan. It's also associated with the Walt Disney Company's Southeast Asia division as well as ABC Australia. Portfolio Entertainment CEO and co-founder Joy Rosen remarked that the company felt "thrilled to land international deals with world-renowned broadcasters right out of the gate", also stating that the series is "crammed with laugh-out-loud moments and unpredictable twists that will perfectly complement the highly-entertaining programming available on these major kids' networks". On October 29, 2016, Portfolio made new deals with Pop Max in the UK, DR Ultra in Denmark, Disney India, and KIDZ in Israel.

== See also ==
- Canadian animation
