= Toei Animation Inc. =

American entertainment company

- Type: Subsidiary
- Industry: Multimedia entertainment
- Founded: March 2004; 22 years ago
- Headquarters: 2029 Century Park East, Suite 422, Los Angeles, California, U.S. (mid-2000s); Los Angeles, California, U.S.
- Area served: North America, South America, Oceania and South Africa
- Key people: Masayuki Endo (president and CEO)
- Products: Anime
- Parent: Toei Animation
- Website: toei-animation-usa.com (USA website); toei-animation-la.com (LATAM website)

Toei Animation Inc. (abbreviated as TAI, or sometimes just Toei Animation USA or Toei Animation LATAM depending on the territory) is an American licensing and distribution company that operates as an international distribution arm of the Japanese animation studio Toei Animation. Originally founded in 2004 and based in Los Angeles, the company is responsible for licensing the studio's library across North America, South America, South Africa, Australia, and New Zealand. It holds partnerships with TV channels, DVD distributors, and streaming websites.

== History ==
Due to Toei Animation's decision to start distributing the series directly since 2003 with the establishment of Toei Animation Europe based in Paris, Toei Animation Inc. based in Los Angeles. Established in Los Angeles in March 2004 as a subsidiary of Toei Animation Co., Ltd. Alongside program licensing, the Los Angeles Office oversees consumer-product licensing for the studio's films and television properties in its territories.

In November 2004, Toei had signed a deal with Geneon USA to distribute three titles, Air Master, Interlude and Slam Dunk on DVD in North America. This announcement noted that Toei Animation's U.S. affiliate was registered as Toei Animation Inc. in Century City, California. Under this arrangement, Toei produced the DVD releases for North America, with Geneon acting as the distributor instead of licensor. In September 2006, Geneon announced that most of the Toei DVDs they distributed, including some unreleased content, were discontinued. Toei has since distributed their franchises in Latin America, including Dragon Ball and Saint Seiya.

== Anime ==
=== Distributor ===
- Air Gear (sub-distributed by Funimation (later Crunchyroll) for U.S.)
- Dragon Ball franchise (distributed directly for Latin America since 2005 and sub-distributed by Funimation (later Crunchyroll) for U.S.)
- Digimon franchise (distributed directly for Latin America since 2005, and U.S. since 2018 originally distributed by Saban Entertainment, BVS Entertainment and Saban Brands. The first three seasons of the franchise and the first six movies are currently sub-distributed by Discotek Media in the U.S.)
- Dr. Slump (distributed directly for Latin America since 2005)
- GeGeGe no Kitaro franchise

- 1996's series (distributed directly for Latin America since 2005)
- 2018's series

- Magical DoReMi franchise (distributed directly for Latin America since 2005, and U.S. since 2025)
- Mazinger Z (distributed directly for Latin America since 2012)
- Ghost Sweeper Mikami (distributed directly for Latin America since 2005)
- Hell Teacher Nūbē (distributed directly for Latin America since 2005)
- Ashita no Nadja (distributed directly for Latin America since 2005)
- One Piece (4Kids version, distributed directly for Latin America and sub-distributed by Funimation (later Crunchyroll) for U.S.)
- Pretty Cure franchise

- Futari wa Pretty Cure (distributed directly for Latin America since 2008)
- Glitter Force (distributed directly for Latin America and U.S. since 2017)
- Glitter Force Doki Doki (sub-distributed by Saban Brands (later Hasbro Entertainment) for U.S. and Latin America)

- Saint Seiya franchise (distributed directly for Latin America since 2005)
- Sailor Moon franchise (distributed directly for Latin America since 2005 and sub-distributed by Viz Media for U.S. since 2014)

- Sailor Moon Crystal (distributed directly for Latin America since 2017 and sub-distributed by Viz Media for U.S.)

- Slam Dunk (distributed directly for Latin America since 2005)
- Toriko (distributed directly for Latin America since 2012 and sub-distributed by Funimation (later Crunchyroll) for U.S.)
- World Trigger (sub-distributed by Sentai Filmworks in partnership with Crunchyroll for home video rights in U.S.)

=== Original productions ===
- Knights of the Zodiac: Saint Seiya (2019–2024)

=== Full catalog ===
As of 2026, Toei list 181 television series and 131 films available for licensing, grouped by Genre.

==== Television series (181) ====
Adventure/Action (53

- Ken, the Wild Boy
- A Little Ninja, Fujimaru
- The Pirate Prince
- Tiger Mask
- Tiger Mask II
- A Kick Fiend
- An Apache Baseball Team
- Ryu, the Cave Boy
- Super Duch Hawk
- Grand Prix
- King Arthur
- King Arthur Prince on a White Horse
- Genki, the Boy Champ
- Mr. Muscleman
- Mr. Muscleman Scramble for the Throne
- Mr. Muscleman Second Generation
- Little Big Nose
- Wingman
- Ken the Great Bear Fist
- Silver Fang
- Ikki-man
- Bikkuriman
- New Bikkuriman
- Super Phoenix
- Happy Lucky Bikkuriman
- Ninja Akakage
- Lomien Man
- Otoko Juku
- The Great Adventure of Dai
- Ghost Sweeper Mikami
- Slam Dunk
- Shoot!!
- Shinken Legend
- Gulliver Boy
- Mushurambo
- Airmaster
- Gash Bell!!
- Beet the Vandel Buster
- Beet the Vandel Buster Excellion
- Ring ni Kakero
- Ring ni Kakero US vs. Japan
- Ring ni Kakero Shadow
- Ring ni Kakero World Tournament
- Taichi Chaser
- Toriko
- Driland Season 1
- Driland Season 2
- World Trigger
- Rowdy Sumo Wrestler Matsutaro
- Tiger Mask W
- Baku Tsuri Barcode-Hunter
- Dragon Quest: The Adventure of Dai
- Surviving Science!

Magical girl (21)

- Sally, the Witch
- Sally the Witch 2
- The Secrets of Akkochan
- The Secrets of Akkochan 2
- The Secrets of Akkochan 3
- Maco, the Mermaid
- Sarutobi Ecchan
- Chappie, the Witch
- Limit-chan
- Cutey Honey
- Cutey Honey Flash
- Megu, the Little Witch
- Lulu the Flower Angel
- Lalabel, the Magical Girl
- Fun Fun Pharmacy
- Magical DoReMi
- Magical DoReMi #
- Magical DoReMi 3
- Magical DoReMi 4
- Magical DoReMi 5
- Jeanne, the Kamikaze Thief

Comedy (24)

- Hustle Punch
- Pyun Pyun Maru
- Akane-chan
- Furious Ataro
- Furious Ataro 2
- Ikkyu-san
- Dr. Slump -Arale-
- Dr. Slump
- Super Gal Asari
- Patalliro
- Stop!! Hibari!!
- Gu-gu Ganmo
- Modern Kids
- Kariage-kun
- Magical Taluluto
- Goldfish Forecast
- Azumi Mamma Mia
- I'm Hani Taro
- Miiko
- Puchan
- Tsuri Baka Nisshi
- Bobobo-bo Bo-bobo
- Keihin Kazoku
- Ikimono-san

Science fiction/Robots (31)

- Space Kid Jun
- Robin in the Rainbow Troops
- Cyborg 009
- Mazinger Z
- Great Mazinger
- Babil II
- Microid S
- Getta Robot
- Getta Robot G
- Goldbang
- UFO Robot Grendizer Raids
- Jeeg, the Steel Robot
- Dino Mech Gaiking
- Gaiking
- Ga-Keen, the Magnetic Robot
- Jet Mars
- Planet Robot Danguard Ace
- Balatack
- Space Pirate Captain Harlock
- Starzinger
- Galaxy Express 999
- Captain Future
- Interlude
- Xenosaga: The Animation
- Olynssis the Silver Color
- Robot Girls Z
- Robot Girls Z Plus
- Robot Girls Neo
- Majin Bone
- Kado: The Right Answer
- Augmented Reality Girls Trinary

Mystery/Horror (17)

- GeGeGe no Kitaro
- GeGeGe no Kitaro 2
- GeGeGe no Kitaro 3
- GeGeGe no Kitaro 4
- GeGeGe no Kitaro 5
- GeGeGe no Kitaro 6
- Hakaba Kitaro
- Devilman
- Dororon Enmakun
- Devil Boy
- Nube
- The File of Young Kindaichi
- The File of Young Kindaichi Returns Chapter 1
- The File of Young Kindaichi Returns Chapter 2
- Ayakashi
- Mononoke
- Thriller Restaurant

Romance (15)

- Hello, Sandybell
- The Pumpkin Wine
- Love in Rock'n'Roll
- Step, Jun
- Lady Lady!!
- Hello! Lady Lynn
- Marmalade Boy
- Neighborhood Story
- Hana Yori Dango
- Moon Guardian
- Kanon
- Nadja
- Iriya's Sky, the Summer with UFO
- Kamisama Kazoku
- Lovely Complex

Fantasy/Family (15)

- Little Memole
- Maple Town Story
- New Maple Town Story
- World Fairy Tales
- Crayon Kingdom
- The Third One of the Haruba
- Pip Pop Pattle
- Nono-chan
- Meister Hamsters
- My Three Daughters
- Asataro
- Marie & Gali
- Marie & Gali ver. 2.0
- The Supernatural Sweet Shop
- Butt Detective

Drama (5)

- The Legend of Gambler – Tetsuya
- Flat Broke Sisters
- Kyousougiga
- Kanpai
- Girls Band Cry

==== Films (131) ====
Adventure/Action (30)

- Mr. Muscleman 1
- Mr. Muscleman 2: The Rowdy Superman of Justice
- Mr. Muscleman 3: Righteous Supermen vs. Ancient Supreme
- Mr. Muscleman 4: Counterattack! A Hidden Supermen in the Space
- Mr. Muscleman 5: The Gallant Figure of Righteous Superman
- Mr. Muscleman 6: The Critical New York
- Mr. Muscleman 7: Righteous Superman vs. Super Warrior
- Lomien-man
- Mr. Muscleman Second Generation 1
- Mr. Muscleman Second Generation 2
- Ken, the Great Bear Fist: Fist of the North Star
- Bikkuri Man 1
- Bikkuri Man 2: The Secret of Muen Zone
- Otoko Juku
- The Great Adventure of Dai
- The Great Adventure of Dai 2: Avan's Disciples
- The Great Adventure of Dai 3: Six Great Generals
- Rokudenashi Blues
- Rokudenashi Blues 1993
- Slam Dunk 1
- Slam Dunk 2: National Tournament
- Slam Dunk 3: Crisis of Shohoku School
- Slam Dunk 4: Roar! Basketman Spirit
- Ghost Sweeper Mikami
- Shoot!!
- Gash Bell!: 101st Devil
- Gash Bell!: Attack of Mechavulcan
- Toriko: Secret Recipe of Gourmet God
- Barcode-Hunter (Toei Manga Matsuri 2019)
- The First Slam Dunk

Magical girl (9)

- Lulu, the Flower Angel: Hello Cherry Garden
- Lalabel, the Magic Girl
- The Secrets of Akkochan 1
- The Secrets of Akkochan 2: Summer Festival
- Sally, the Witch
- Cutey Honey F
- Magical DoReMi #
- Magical DoReMi 3: The Secret of the Frog Stone
- Looking for Magical DoReMi

Comedy (23)

- Ikkyu-san and a Mischievous Princess
- Ikkyu-san: It's Spring! Mischievous Princess
- The Devil and the Princess
- Dr. Slump Arale 1: Hello! Wonderland
- Dr. Slump Arale 2: Space Adventure
- Dr. Slump Arale 3: The Great Race Around the World
- Dr. Slump Arale 4: The Secret of Nanaba Castle
- Dr. Slump Arale 5: The City of Dream, Mechapolis
- Dr. Slump Arale 6: Sunny Penguin Village
- Dr. Slump Arale 7: With Love from Penguin Village
- Dr. Slump Arale 8: Trip with the Shark
- Dr. Slump Arale 9: Summer Vacation
- Dr. Slump Arale's Surprising Burn!
- Dr. Slump
- Super Gal Asari: The Dreaming Girl in Fairy World
- Patalliro! Stardust Project
- Gu-Gu Ganmo
- Kennosuke-sama
- Magical Taluluto 1
- Magical Taluluto 2: Magic Battle of the Friendship
- Magical Taluluto 3: My Favorite Takoyaki
- Goldfish Forecast
- Osawaga! Super Baby

Science fiction/Robots (17)

- Mazinger Z vs. Devilman
- Mazinger Z vs. General Dark
- Great Mazinger vs. Getta Robot
- Great Mazinger vs. Getta Robo G: A Fierce Battle in the Air
- Space Disc War
- UFO Robot Grendizer vs. Great Mazinger
- Grendizer, Getta Robot G, Great Mazinger: The Decisive Battle! Huge Sea Animal
- Danguard Ace vs. Insect Robot Troop
- Space Battle, Danguard Ace
- Captain Harlock: The Secret of the Arcadia
- Harlock: Space Pirate
- Galaxy Express 999
- Galaxy Express 999: Crystal Clair
- Adieu Galaxy Express 999
- Galaxy Express 999: Eternal Fantasy
- Toward the Terra
- Mazinger Z: Infinity

Drama (3)

- Expelled from Paradise
- Wandering Cloud
- Asura

Mystery/Horror (16)

- GeGeGe no Kitaro 1
- GeGeGe no Kitaro 2: The Goblin War
- GeGeGe no Kitaro 3: The Goblin Army Landed Japan
- GeGeGe no Kitaro 4: The Revolt of the Goblin from the Other Dimensional World
- GeGeGe no Kitaro 5: Big Sea Ghost
- GeGeGe no Kitaro 6: Ghost Night Game
- GeGeGe no Kitaro 7: Ghost Express
- GeGeGe no Kitaro 8: Japan on Fire!
- Devil Boy 1
- Devil Boy 2: Welcome to the Devil Land
- Nube 1
- Nube 2: Nube Died at AM00:00
- Nube 3: Horror of Summer Vacation
- Young Kindaichi's Case Book 1
- Young Kindaichi's Case Book 2: Deep Blue of Massacre
- Thriller Restaurant

Romance (10)

- The Door to the Summer
- The Pumpkin Wine: Love Story of Nita
- Lady Lady!!
- Pink: Water Thief and Rain Thief
- Marmalade Boy
- Neighborhood Story
- Hana Yori Dango
- Air
- The Last Love Song on This Little Planet
- Clannad

Fantasy/Family (11)

- Little Memole
- Maple Town Story
- New Maple Town Story
- Rainbow Fireflies
- Pop in Q
- Toei Manga Matsuri
- My 3 Daughters The Movie (Toei Manga Matsuri)
- Butt Detective The Movie: The Case of Courageous Curry (Toei Manga Matsuri)
- Butt Detective The Movie: Mystery of the Ladybug Ruins (Toei Manga Matsuri 2020)
- Butt Detective The Movie: The Secret of Souffle Island (Toei Manga Matsuri 2021)
- Magic Candies

3D attractions (13)

- Digimon Adventure 3D: Digimon Grand Prix
- Digimon Savers 3D: Digital World
- PreCure Splash Star 3D Theatre
- PreCure All Stars DX 3D Theatre
- GeGeGe no Kitaro 3D Theatre Yokocho
- GeGeGe no Kitaro Yokai Japan Rally 3D
- GeGeGe no Kitaro: Kitaro Ghost Train 3D
- Kikansha Yaemon 3D
- Toriko 3D: Begin! The Gourmet Adventure!!
- One Piece 3D: Mugiwara Chase
- One Piece 3D: Bust Driving Trap Roller Coaster
- Harlock: Space Pirate
- Dragon Ball Z: Resurrection 'F'

== Partnerships ==
Toei Animation Inc. has more than 30 partner companies. They include streaming services such as Crunchyroll, Funimation, Netflix, Hulu, Amazon, HBO Max, Tubi, Pluto TV, Hoopla, Vudu, AnimeLab, AnimeOnegai, Blim, Claro Video, Globoplay, and Looke; media and distribution companies such as Televisa, Madman Entertainment, Shout! Studios, Viz Media, and Fathom Events; and technology and consumer-products companies such as Apple, Microsoft, Sony, Bandai, and Bandai Namco.
