= Treehouse Detectives =

CG animated children's series

- Genre: Animation
- Directed by: BJ Lee
- Voices of: Jenna Davis; Brody Allen; Philece Sampler; Ryan Bartley; Leigh Kelly; Abby Trott
- Composer: Noam Kaniel
- Countries of origin: United States; South Korea
- Original language: English
- No. of seasons: 2
- No. of episodes: 20

Production
- Executive producers: Rich Magallanes; Moon Ju Kang
- Producers: Kris Marvin Hughes; Hong Chul Cho
- Running time: 23 minutes
- Production companies: Saban Brands; ENPOP

Original release
- Network: Netflix
- Release: June 8 – November 9, 2018

Treehouse Detectives is an animated television series produced by Saban Brands and ENPOP. The series premiered on Netflix on June 8, 2018, and follows the brother and sister detective team Toby and Teri as they "use the clues" and "follow the facts" to solve everything from backyard mysteries to the bigger puzzles of the natural world in their home forest of Acorn Springs. On May 1, 2018, Saban Brands sold Treehouse Detectives to Hasbro. Season 2 was released on November 9, 2018.

== Characters ==
- Teri (voiced by Jenna Davis): a bear, and Toby's older sister. She dresses in red and is commonly the brains and the most level-headed of the 2. She carries around a tablet known as the WhyTab, which is used to look up facts on their cases.
- Toby (voiced by Brody Allen): a bear, and Teri's younger brother. He dresses in blue and is the more creative of the 2, commonly inventing numerous complex inventions for the required case. He also carries around many non-electronic tools and knows morse code.
- Rumy (voiced by Philece Sampler): a nervous pig who can be easily excitable, and will more often than not run away from anything that scares him. He is also one of the more emotionally sensitive members of the group, and can be upset if something hurtful happens. This also makes him a good babysitter.
- Jay (voiced by Ryan Bartley): a hyperactive blue jay who can often speak faster than he thinks, and is the smallest member of the group. As a bird, he is the only member capable of flight, and can often be reckless, but playful and friendly.
- Bean (voiced by Leigh Kelly): a young squirrel best friends with Jay and Rumy, often serving as the brains to their escapades. He is still daring, and will often pull off foolish decisions. As a squirrel, he has a love for acorns. He is very playful, and loves helping out others.
- Millie (voiced by Abby Trott): a bespectacled rabbit, and the only one to wear glasses, which allow her to see. A talented artist and cook, Millie often serves as a babysitter to Bean, Jay and Rumy, and often draws while the other three play (though she'll join in a few times). She aspires to be a doctor.

== Episodes ==
=== Season 1 (2018) ===
1. The Case of the Buzzing Buddies / The Case of the Crazy Cup
2. The Case of the Collapsing Castle / The Case of the Hurt Bird
3. The Case of the Invisible Owl / The Case of the Flying Pig
4. The Case of the Spooky Squeak / The Case of the Purple Pond
5. The Case of the Talking Rock / The Case of the Readymade Rainbow
6. The Case of the Missing Explorer / The Case of the Orphaned Egg
7. The Case of the Lost Logs / The Case of the Super Squirrel
8. The Case of the Floating Ghost / The Case of the Wise Eyes
9. The Case of the Bountiful Berries / The Case of the Colorful Caterpillars
10. The Case of the Counterfeit Chameleon / The Case of the Remarkable Rocks

=== Season 2 (2018) ===
1. The Case of the Wandering Water / The Case of the Mysterious Melody
2. The Case of the Suspicious Snowflakes / The Case of the Missing Instrument
3. The Case of the Absent Acorns / The Case of the Slippery Sticks
4. The Case of the Bashful Ball / The Case of the Pond Monster
5. The Case of the Reckless Raven / The Case of the Friendly Oak
6. The Case of the Tall Tail / The Case of the Shooting Star
7. The Case of the Flying Fish / The Case of the Soggy Sculpture
8. The Case of the Super Sled / The Case of the Snowy Coat
9. The Case of the Clumsy Crane / The Case of the Snowy Secret
10. The Case of the Homemade Holiday / The Case of the Deputy Detectives
