= Luna Petunia =

Animated television series

- Also known as: Luna Petunia: Return to Amazia
- Genre: Fantasy
- Created by: Dave Thomas
- Developed by: Bradley Zweig
- Directed by: Donnie Anderson
- Starring: Ciara Alexys
- Voices of: Alexa Benkert; Jonah Wineberg; Cory Doran; Katie Griffin
- Composer: Noam Kaniel
- Countries of origin: United States; Canada
- Original language: English
- No. of seasons: 5
- No. of episodes: 33

Production
- Executive producers: Rich Magallanes; Beth Stevenson; Jacques Méthé (Seasons 1-3); Sébastien Ouimet (Return to Amazia)
- Producers: Janice Walker; John Hardman (Seasons 1-3); Kris Marvin Hughes (Seasons 2-3 and Return to Amazia)
- Running time: 22 minutes
- Production companies: Saban Brands; BrainPower Studio; Cirque du Soleil

Original release
- Network: Netflix
- Release: December 9, 2016 – July 21, 2018

Luna Petunia is a live action/animated television series co-produced by Saban Brands, BrainPower Studio and Cirque du Soleil Media. The series premiered on Netflix on December 9, 2016. It follows the adventures of a live-action little girl named Luna Petunia who receives a toy chest on her birthday where she is transported into the animated world of Amazia where she learns how to make the impossible possible. Season 2 was released on July 7, 2017. Season 3 was released on November 17, 2017.

It was followed by Luna Petunia: Return to Amazia on February 2, 2018. Season 2 was released on July 20, 2018.

The series made its television debut on Discovery Family and Univision on July 1, 2019. The series aired until September 2020.

== Cast ==
- Ciara Alexys as Luna
  - Ana Araujo as Luna (Live action)
- Cory Doran (originally Weird Al) as Sammy Stretch
- Katie Griffin as Bibi Bubbles
- Jonah Wineberg as Karoo
- James Kee as Chef Zesto
- Eddie Glen as Donnie Doohickey
- Steph Lynn Robinson as Zoom Shine
- Stephanie Anne Mills as Macy

== Episodes ==
=== Season 1 (2016) ===
1. "Amazing Amazia Rainbow"
2. "The Fuzzlings" / "Now We're Cooking"
3. "Grumpy Volcano" / "Shadow Show"
4. "Star Dust" / "Popcorn Storm"
5. "The Crystal Queen" / "Seahorse Hero"
6. "Lost Land" / "Boom Shine"
7. "The Show Must Go On" / "Great Train Chase"
8. "Wishy Swishy Wishing Well" / "Painting Day"
9. "Take Off Your Dancing Shoes" / "Dream Boat"
10. "Sammy's Grammy" / "Melvin's Magical Mix-up"
11. "Happy Jollydays"

=== Season 2 (2017) ===
1. "Creepy Castle" / "Gemhenge"
2. "Queen Luna" / "Cloudy with a Chance of Balloons"
3. "Perfect Picnic" / "Bad Bubble Blues"
4. "Karoo the Great and Powerful" / "Fellinocchio"
5. "Lights Camera Sammy" / "Tricky Situation"

=== Season 3 (2017) ===
1. "A Big Stretch" / "Learning to Fly"
2. "Lil' Rooey" / "How Does Your Garden Grow"
3. "Super Gloop" / "Perfect Toy"
4. "Luna Day" / "The Big Sleep"
5. "Plant Power" / "Caterball"
6. "Treasure of Amazia"

=== Return to Amazia ===
==== Season 1 (2018) ====
1. "Macy's Memorable Morning" / "The Curious Case of the Color Catastrophe"
2. "Fumble Cat" / "Sammy Gets A Big Head"
3. "Keep Calm and Karoo On" / "Runaway Tree"
4. "Warm and Fuzzling" / "Gift Horse"
5. "What a Racquet" / "Petunia Sitter"

==== Season 2 (2018) ====
1. "Macy's Sleepover" / "Elephant Fly"
2. "Macy Takes the Lead" / "Glitterlympics"
3. "Slumber Cats" / "Picture Imperfect"
4. "Bella Balloons" / "The Bubble Ball"
5. "Rocking Pony Express" / "Moon Balloon"
6. "When Monkeyphants Fly" / "The Trouble with Glitter Bunnies"
