= Julius Jr. =

Animated preschool television series

- Promotional poster featuring Julius (front) and his friends (from left to right): Worry Bear, Ping, Sheree, and Clancy.
- Based on: Julius the Monkey by Paul Frank
- Developed by: Holly Huckins; Katherine Sandford
- Directed by: Paul Brown; Chris Labonte
- Voices of: E.G. Daily; Julie Lemieux; Athena Karkanis; Benjamin Israel; Steph Lynn Robinson; Rob Tinkler
- Composers: Tim Foy; Paul Koffman
- Countries of origin: United States; Canada
- Original language: English
- No. of seasons: 2
- No. of episodes: 52 (104 segments)

Production
- Executive producers: Brian Casentini; Elie Dekel; Beth Stevenson
- Producers: Janice Walker; John Hardman
- Running time: 23 minutes
- Production companies: Brain Power Studio; Saban Brands

Original release
- Network: Nick Jr.
- Release: September 29, 2013 – August 9, 2015

Julius Jr. is an animated preschool children's television series based on the characters of the Paul Frank brand. Produced by American company Saban Brands, with animation services provided by Canadian company Brain Power Studio, the show aired on the Nick Jr. Channel in the United States. The show debuted on September 29, 2013, with its second season premiering on November 3, 2014. The show’s last episode aired on August 9, 2015, when the TV series was taken off the air. In 2019, all online content regarding the show was removed from Nick Jr.'s website as well. The show features E.G. Daily as the voice of Julius.

== Premise ==
The series centers around Julius Jr., a young monkey with a penchant for invention. Together with his friends, Worry Bear, Sheree, Clancy, and Ping, they build a playhouse out of a simple cardboard box. But when they walk inside, to their surprise and delight, they discover that ordinary objects magically come to life and amazing adventures are just a door away in a magical hall of doors.

At the end of each episode, an original song is featured. The song shows highlights from the shown episode. Most known songs are "Hey Hey Hey", "Come on, Come On", "Honesty (For You and Me)", "Stronger and Braver", "Big Dance Party", and more.

The Hall of Doors leads the cast to:

- Icelaska- A portmanteau of Alaska and Iceland.
- Bugswana- A parody of Botswana.
- Seashelly Islands- Named after seashells.
- Twirl-a-World- A parody of Twirl-a-Whirl.
- Castledonia- Named after castles.
- Sagebrush Farm- Named after the sagebrush plants.
- Enginopolis- Named after engines.
- The Invention Dimension- As the name implies, it is where Julius creates all of his various inventions, though in most episodes it is only shown from the outside.

== Cast ==
- Julius Jr. (voiced by E.G. Daily)
- Clancy (voiced by Julie Lemieux)
- Sheree (voiced by Athena Karkanis)
- Worry Bear (voiced by Benjamin Israel)
- Ping (voiced by Stephanie Lynn Robinson)

== Episodes ==
=== Season 1 (2013–14) ===
No. overall	No. in season	Title	Animation director(s)	Written by	Original release date	U.S. viewers (millions)
1	1	"Butterfly Dreams"	Chris Labonte	Katherine Sandford	September 29, 2013	0.55
1	1	"Rock Sock 3000"	Paul Brown	Katherine Sandford	September 29, 2013	0.55
2	2	"Pony Macaroni / Stretch Clancy"	Unknown	Katherine Sandford	October 6, 2013	0.82
3	3	"Farmer Sheree / Dez the Dragon"	Chris Labonte, Paul Brown	Katherine Sandford and Brendan Russell	October 13, 2013	0.41
4	4	"Pirates and Superheroes / Banana-licious"	Chris Labonte, Paul Brown	Ford Riley	October 20, 2013	0.75
5	5	"Clancy's Sniffles / Shadow Play"	Chris Labonte, Paul Brown	Unknown	November 3, 2013	0.66
6	6	"Dressed for Spook-cess / Think Pink"	Chris Labonte, Paul Brown	Katherine Sandford and Lienne Sawatsky & Daniel Williams	October 27, 2013	0.75
7	7	"Worry Bear's Collection / Rocket Roller Skates"	Chris Labonte, Paul Brown	Katherine Sandford and Amanda McNeice	November 17, 2013	0.63
8	8	"No Snow Mo / Gravity Games"	Paul Brown	Brendan Russell	December 1, 2013	0.39
9	9	"Bouncy Beans / A Real Hero"	Paul Brown	Brendan Russell and Lienne Sawatsky & Daniel Williams	December 15, 2013	0.39
10	10	"Star Games / The Joke's on Who?"	Paul Brown	Cathy Moss and Sheila Dinsmore	December 29, 2013	0.52
11	11	"From Me to You / Give Ping a Chance"	Paul Brown	Jymn Magon and Amanda McNeice	January 19, 2014	0.59
12	12	"Magic Monkey Hidden Dragon / Perfect Pirate Day"	Paul Brown	Brendan Russell and Jymn Magon	February 2, 2014	0.48
13	13	"Tidy Up / Robo Flop"	Paul Brown	Brendan Russell and Jymn Magon	February 16, 2014	0.43
14	14	"Operation: Sand Squasher / Dr. Flossoraptor"	Paul Brown	Amanda McNeice	May 3, 2014	0.68
15	15	"Fruitronic 5000 / Flights of Fancy"	Paul Brown	Brendan Russell and Katherine Sandford	August 2, 2014	0.57
16	16	"Clancy, Be Careful! / Just Speak Up"	Paul Brown	Cathy Moss and Katherine Sandford	May 10, 2014	N/A
17	17	"Say Ping / Happy Birthday, Nova!"	Paul Brown	Brendan Russell and Katherine Sandford	May 17, 2014	N/A
18	18	"Shaka Brah in the House / Baby Squeakers"	Paul Brown	Katherine Sandford	May 24, 2014	N/A
19	19	"Giggle Goggles / Scavenger Safari"	Paul Brown	Katherine Sandford	June 7, 2014	N/A
20	20	"The Very Berry Race / Check the Check List"	Paul Brown	Katherine Sandford and Brendan Russell	July 7, 2014	N/A
21	21	"Crow Con / Rock Sitting"	Mike Weiss	Amanda McNeice and Brendan Russell	July 9, 2014	N/A
22	22	"Sneaky Snackers / Make Me a Flake"	Unknown	Katherine Sandford and Amanda McNeice	July 11, 2014	N/A
23	23	"Bump on Mars / Worry Bear Junior"	Unknown	Amanda McNeice and Brendan Russell	September 6, 2014	N/A
24	24	"Julius Goes Solo / Clancy Can't Win"	Unknown	Amanda McNeice	August 9, 2014	N/A
25	25	"Plane Dilemma / Delayed Parade"	Unknown	Katherine Sandford and Amanda McNeice	August 16, 2014	N/A
26	26	"Welcome Home, Chachi! / Chachi Time"	Unknown	Katherine Sandford	September 13, 2014	N/A

=== Season 2 (2014–15) ===
No. overall	No. in season	Title	Directed by	Written by	Original release date	U.S. viewers (millions)
27	1	"Dazzle Girls / The Box"	Unknown	Katherine Sandford and Anne-Marie Perrotta	November 3, 2014	N/A
28	2	"Great Inventini / Drive-In Distractions"	Unknown	Katherine Sandford and Anne-Marie Perrotta	November 5, 2014	N/A
29	3	"Helping Hands / Imagineberry Jam"	Paul Brown and Mike Weiss	Jymn Magon and Amanda McNeice	November 7, 2014	N/A
30	4	"Duckyitis / Orange Day Dream"	Paul Brown and Mike Weiss	Amanda McNeice and Anne-Marie Perrotta	November 8, 2014	N/A
31	5	"Capture the Pirate Flag / Gummiest Bear"	Unknown	Brendan Russell and Mark Valenti	November 15, 2014	N/A
32	6	"Party Me Hearties / Chore Bore"	Paul Brown and Mike Weiss	Betty Quan and Madellaine Paxson	November 22, 2014	N/A
33	7	"A Snowflake Day / Deep Space Sport"	Mike Weiss	Amanda McNeice and Betty Quan	November 29, 2014	N/A
34	8	"Pumpkin Plumper / No Sleep Over"	Mike Weiss	Mark Valenti and Anne-Marie Perrotta	April 12, 2015	N/A
35	9	"Sheree's Choice / Sharky in the Dark"	Unknown	Mark Valenti and Anne-Marie Perrotta	April 19, 2015	N/A
36	10	"Smellalicious Flower / Welcomesicle Party"	Unknown	Betty Quan and Amanda McNeice	April 26, 2015	N/A
37	11	"Invention Tension / Flying Oh Ee Oh"	Unknown	Mark Valenti and Elise Allen	May 3, 2015	N/A
38	12	"Julius' All-iday / Worry Bear Finds the Light"	Mike Weiss	Katherine Sandford	December 13, 2014	N/A
39	13	"Ping's Pretend Problem / Please Don't Sneeze"	Unknown	Amanda McNeice and Brendan Russell	May 10, 2015	N/A
40	14	"Worry Bear's Lucky Hat / Do the Dez Bop"	Unknown	Katherine Sandford	May 17, 2015	N/A
41	15	"We Love You, Rock Sock! / Clancy's Collection"	Unknown	Katherine Sandford and Amanda McNeice	May 24, 2015	N/A
42	16	"Clancy's Dream Team / Magical Morphimal"	Unknown	Katherine Sandford and Amanda McNeice	May 31, 2015	N/A
43	17	"Grump-Noceros / Later Skater"	Unknown	Amanda McNeice and Brendan Russell	June 7, 2015	N/A
44	18	"A Daisy for Dazzle / Waiting for Julius"	Unknown	Katherine Sandford and Anne-Marie Perrotta	June 14, 2015	N/A
45	19	"Pirate Julius / Mars Bouquet"	Unknown	Anne-Marie Perrotta and Madellaine Paxson	June 21, 2015	N/A
46	20	"Not So Funny Pages / Missing Piece Magic Show"	Unknown	Brendan Russell and Amanda McNeice	June 28, 2015	N/A
47	21	"2 Skate 2B Great / Sparkletasia"	Unknown	Katherine Sandford	July 5, 2015	N/A
48	22	"Appreciated / Our Hero Worry Bear"	Unknown	Katherine Sandford and Anne-Marie Perrotta	July 12, 2015	N/A
49	23	"Julius-inator / Don't Worry Be Happy"	Unknown	Katherine Sandford and Elise Allen	July 19, 2015	N/A
50	24	"Box Fort of Oz / Firefly Festival"	Unknown	Katherine Sandford and Brendan Russell	July 26, 2015	N/A
51	25	"Double O Sheree / Ping's in Charge"	Unknown	Jymn Magon and Katherine Sandford & Anne-Marie Perrotta	August 2, 2015	N/A
52	26	"Funk in the Junk / Enginopalooza"	Unknown	Rob Tinkler and Katherine Sandford	August 9, 2015	N/A

== Broadcast ==
Following its U.S. premiere in 2013, the show later premiered on Discovery Kids in 2014 in Latin America. In the United Kingdom, it premiered on Cartoonito on April 6, 2015.

In France, the show premiered on TF1's TFOU block on June 16, 2014.

In Canada, the show premiered on Family Jr. on May 12, 2015.

The show also premiered in Albania on Çufo on May 4, 2016 under the title "Xhuliusi i vogël" (Little Julius).

On May 1, 2018, Saban Brands sold the rights to the series to Hasbro. The show was previously available on Netflix, but was removed from the streaming service on November 3, 2020. It was added to Crave on August 10, 2022.

Julius Jr. was also available on Ameba TV and Kartoon Channel but as of March 2024, it got removed from both apps.

As of September 2025, the show is officially available to watch on The Roku Channel, and Tubi with all 2 seasons and 52 episodes.
