= Out of Control (TV series) =

American television series (1984–85)

- Out of Control title screen
- Created by: Bob Hughes
- Starring: Dave Coulier; Jill Wakewood; Diz McNally; Marty Schiff; David Stenstrom
- Country of origin: United States
- Original language: English
- No. of seasons: 1
- No. of episodes: 26

Production
- Executive producers: Bob Klein; Bruce Littlejohn
- Producer: Bob Hughes
- Camera setup: Multi-camera
- Running time: 22–24 minutes

Original release
- Network: Nickelodeon
- Release: October 6, 1984 – May 1, 1985

Out of Control is an American sketch comedy television series created by Bob Hughes for Nickelodeon. Hosted by Dave Coulier, it centers on the production of a fictional news program. Coulier's character is the coordinator of the news show who vainly tries to get his eccentric crew members to work together. It features sketches with recurring themes by the Duck's Breath Mystery Theatre and interspersed animation by Spectre Productions.

The series' title refers to the control room of a news show; during production, it was named The Out of Control Room. The concept for the series originated from former Nickelodeon president Cy Schneider, who wanted a children's show that parodied the news magazine format. The series ran for a single season of 26 episodes from 1984 to 1985, with reruns continuing (with breaks) until 1993.

The series started the television career of several actors, including Coulier and David Stenstrom, who played the in-house inventor Waldo. While working on the series, Coulier originated many traits that he went on to use for the character Joey Gladstone on Full House, including his signature catchphrase "Cut-it-out!"

== Premise ==
The series focuses on the production of a news program called Out of Control, which is a show-within-a-show. It is hosted by Dave (Dave Coulier), who is level-headed and tries his best to keep the show from getting "out of control." Dave's fellow crew members are archetypal characters, such as the shrill, plastic-fantastic party-girl stage manager Diz Aster (Diz McNally), the clueless reporter Angela "Scoop" Quickly (Jill Wakewood), the caustic newshawk Hern Burford (Marty Schiff), Professor Gravity (who was later re-used in the radio sketch Ask Dr. Science), and Waldo, the bespectacled mad inventor (David Stenstrom) and crew member. The characters refer to a box-like computer called the HA-HA 3200 as the sketch and joke writer for the show.

Guest stars included Bill Bixby (from The Incredible Hulk, and Against the Odds), Mouth Sounds author and Livewire host Fred Newman (who had a sound effects contest with Dave), comedian Bruce Baum (playing a fraud who collected clothing of celebrities), Joel Hodgson (playing an inept magician), and Dennis Miller (a man trying to survive in the desert). Also, Patrick "The Stick" Varnell, best known for the slasher comedy film Student Bodies, made a cameo appearance in the show's first episode; it was his only TV appearance.

=== Regular sketches ===
- Let's Eat – a food segment where Dave goes out to restaurants across the country for what he hears to be "The World's Best". If it matches the claim, Dave presents the "Let's Eat Trophy" (a gold cup with novelty chattering teeth) to the owner or chef of the restaurant.
- It's Probably True! – A news-like segment with real or fictional facts outlined.
- How Not To Do Things – A do-it-yourself segment featuring inept participants with corresponding disastrous results. Some of these how to's include kissing, treehouse, go carts, etc.
- It's Alive! – A segment that deals with animals and nature.
- Are We There Yet? – A segment that displays real or fictional locations.
- Profiles – A person (such as a stuntwoman, a hobo, a street mime, a bodybuilder or even a fountain fairy) is interviewed and showcases their profession.
- Adult Education – A segment "where kids are the teachers and adults are there to learn". A young girl teaches a group of adults various topics that kids know.
- Fast-Told Fairy Tales – A story segment where Diz gives her spin on classic fairy tales while being timed.
- Hurry Up! – A segment where Dave answers a letter and uses a device called the "Hurry-Up Machine" to fast forward through a boring activity.

== Production ==
The general concept for the series originated from Cy Schneider, the president of Nickelodeon at the time of its production. He wanted "a news magazine show for kids that parodied what magazine shows were," and Bob Hughes developed a program using this idea as the basis.

Hughes originally considered Bob Saget, a friend of Coulier who co-starred with him as Danny Tanner on Full House, for the role of the host. Other potentials included comedians Thomas F. Wilson and Joel Hodgson. After Saget interviewed for the part, Hughes was not entirely satisfied, leading Saget to recommend Coulier. Although Saget did not remain a part of Out of Control, a short film that he created while at New York University became the inspiration for the "Hurry Up!" segments.

From 1984 to 1985, the series was shown twice every weekday: once at 9:00 AM, and again at 6:00 PM.

== Episodes ==
Episode Number	Title	Original Air Date
1	Hurry-Up	October 6, 1984
2	Mouth-Off	
3	Inventions	
4	Science	
5	The Big Boss	
6	The Ducks	
7	Love and Hypnotisim	
8	Fashion	
9	Beach	
10	Time Capsule	
11	Bad Luck	
12	Battle of the Reporters	
13	The Shrink/Growth Ray	
14	Marriage	
15	Dave's Birthday	
16	Magic	
17	Eskimo Pies	
18	Mail	
19	The Ape Host	
20	Rock and Roll Studio	
21	The Comedy Computer	
22	The Laugh-Track	
23	The Hurry-Up Time Machine	
24	Worm Contest	
25	Exercise	
26	Pet Dinosaur	
