= Going Great =

1980s Canadian television series

Going Great is a Canadian newsmagazine type show that originally aired on CBC and premiered in the United States on Nickelodeon on October 1, 1983. Produced by Michael Maclear and hosted by Chris Makepeace, Going Great focused on kids of all ages who did very amazing feats in the world some people couldn't do. New episodes aired on Tuesdays and Thursdays until February 14, 1984 (39 episodes).

== History ==
Originally produced by CBC for 13 episodes, Nickelodeon was so impressed by the show that they ordered an additional 26 episodes, bringing the total number of episodes to 39. Going Great was one of Nickelodeon's lowest rated TV shows, receiving a 2 out of every 6 people watching it. Against the Odds is the lowest with 1 out of 6 people watching it.

Going Great focused on being able to do amazing, extreme things. Kids were shown and asked about their bravery, and they always said: "I'm not brave". With help from Nickelodeon, kids were able to do great things, hence the name Going Great.

In 1984, Keanu Reeves was a correspondent for the show.

== Response ==
While Going Great focused on child prodigies, it left normal kids with low self-esteem when Nickelodeon took it to focus groups, with the common response being "Well, I'll never be that good so I won't try that."
