= Robert Rusler =

American film and television actor (born 1965)

- Born: September 20, 1965 (age 61); Fort Wayne, Indiana, U.S.
- Occupation: Actor
- Years active: 1985–present

Robert Rusler (born September 20, 1965) is an American film and television actor. He made his film debut in the teen comedy Weird Science (1985) and subsequently appeared in the horror films A Nightmare on Elm Street 2: Freddy's Revenge (1985) and Vamp (1986). He starred as Tommy Hook in the skateboarding cult film Thrashin' (1986) and as "Buzz" in the 1989 film Shag.

== Life and career ==
Rusler was born in Fort Wayne, Indiana, the son of Maria Elena (née Varela) and Richard C. Rusler.

His first film role was Max in the 1985 comedy Weird Science. He appeared later that year in the horror film A Nightmare on Elm Street 2: Freddy's Revenge as Grady. In 1986, he co-starred with Chris Makepeace in the horror comedy Vamp and with Josh Brolin in the teen sports drama Thrashin'.

He also played Richard Lawson in the 1991 TV film Stephen King's Sometimes They Come Back. Rusler has appeared in television series, such as the short lived 1990 series The Outsiders as Tim Shepard, and in the 1993 series Angel Falls, but his best known TV role may be as Lt. Warren Keffer, commander of a space fighter wing, in season 2 (1994–1995) of Babylon 5. He has acted in the 1995 sci-fi video game flight simulator, Wing Commander IV, which starred Mark Hamill and Malcolm McDowell. He also appeared in an episode of the TV series The Unit.

Rusler has made guest appearances on television shows ranging from The Facts of Life, Snoops, Cold Case, Medium, The Unit, The Closer, 24, Navy NCIS: Naval Criminal Investigative Service, and Enterprise in the season 3 episode "Anomaly" as Orgoth. He has appeared in a Heineken commercial directed by Oliver Stone.

== Filmography ==
=== Film and television credits ===
note: feature film, unless otherwise stated

Year	Title	Role	Notes
1985	The Facts of Life	Neil	Episodes: "Gone with the Wind Part 1" and "Gone with the Wind Part 2"
1985	Weird Science	Max	
1985	A Nightmare on Elm Street 2: Freddy's Revenge	Ron Grady	
1986	Dangerously Close	n/a	
1986	Vamp	A.J.	
1986	Thrashin'	Tommy Hook	
1987	Tonight's the Night	Kenny Costner	TV movie
1989	Shag	Buzz Ravenel	
1990	The Outsiders	Tim Shepard	Main cast
1991	Sometimes They Come Back	Richard Lawson	TV movie
1992	Final Embrace	Kyle Lambton	
1992	Crisis in the Kremlin	Jack Reilly	
1993	Amityville: A New Generation	Ray	Direct-to-video
1993	Angel Falls	Toby Riopelle	
1994–1995	Babylon 5	Lt. Warren Keffer	Main cast (season 2)
1995	Murder, She Wrote	Pete Menteer	Episode: "The Secret of Gila Junction"
1995	Wing Commander IV: The Price of Freedom	Seether	Video game
1997	The Underworld	Dick	TV movie
1999	Mike Hammer, Private Eye	Jimmy Grecco	Episode: "The Long Road to Nowhere"
1999	Wasted in Babylon	Chaz	
1999	Snoops	n/a	Episode: "Bedfellas"
2002	Robbery Homicide Division	Greg Canton	Episode: "In/Famous"
2003	Star Trek: Enterprise	Orgoth	Episode: "Anomaly"
2003	L.A. Dragnet	n/a	Episode: "Slice of Life"
2004	The Whole Ten Yards	Policeman #2	
2004	Cold Case	Lt. Nash Cavanaugh	Episode: "The Plan"
2004	Air Strike	Ben Garrett	Direct-to-video
2004	NCIS	Lt. Col. Curtis Teague	Episode: "Vanished"
2005	Rebound	Falcon Coach	
2006	24	Hank	Episode: "Day 5: 11:00 a.m.-12:00 p.m."
2006	Surveillance	Ben Palmer	
2006	Rising Son: The Legend of Skateboarder Christian Hosoi	Himself	Documentary film
2006	Shifted	Skippy, Tail O' The Pup Employee	
2006	The Hunt Chronicles	Himself	Direct-to-video
2006	The Hunt	Atticus Monroe	
2006	Horror's Hallowed Grounds	Himself	1 episode
2007	Forfeit	Jimmy	
2007	Agenda	Alec Foster	
2007	The Closer	Joe White	Episode: "Lovers Leap"
2007	The Unit	Colonel	Episode: "M.P.s"
2008	Medium	David Barrington	Episode: "Do You Hear What I Hear?"
2008	LA LA Land	Jerry Flaxman	TV movie
2010	Never Sleep Again: The Elm Street Legacy	Himself	Direct-to-video documentary film
2010	The Black Belle	Robert Rusler	
2011	Delivered	Wiggs	
2011	Metro	Balmer	TV movie
2012	Bones	Hunter Sherman	Episode: "The Warrior in the Wuss"
2015	Tales of Halloween	Mr. Blake	
2015	Ray Donovan	Gus O'Dea	Episode: "Breakfast of Champions"
2016	Murder in the First	Detective Ron Bestul	Episode: "Daddy Dearest"
2018	Light as a Feather	Mr. Morris	3 episodes
2019	S.W.A.T.	Leo Moretti	Episode: "Bad Faith"
2020	In Search of Darkness: Part II	Himself	Documentary film
2021	Jakob's Wife	Tom Low	
2025	Garden of Eden	Marcus Eden	
