= Leon Robinson =

American actor

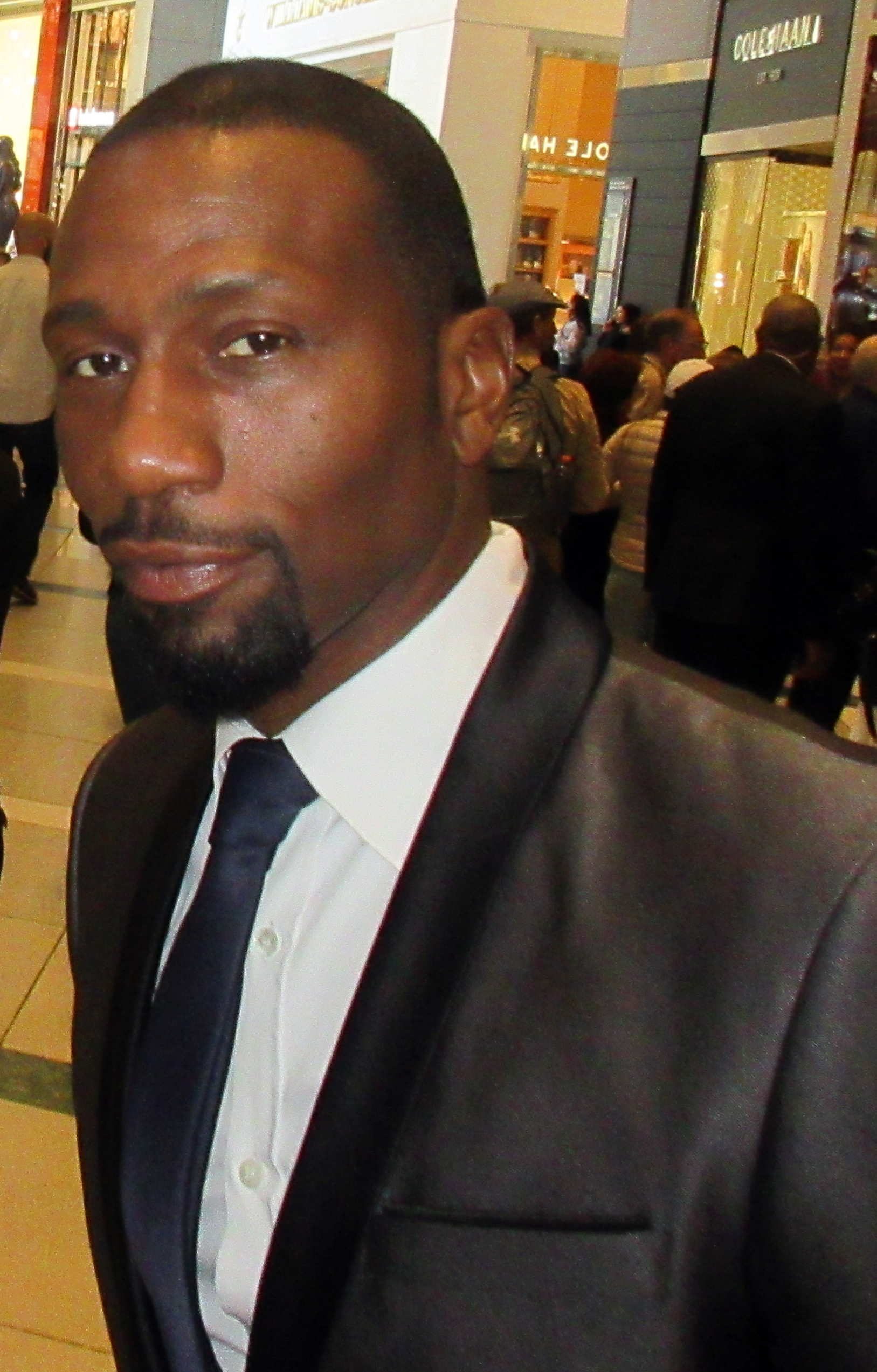
- Robinson in 2019
- Born: Leon Preston Robinson; March 8, 1962 (age 64); New York City, U.S.
- Other name: Leon
- Occupations: Actor; singer
- Years active: 1982–present
- Partners: Cynthia Bailey (1999–2003); Patricia Blanchet (2015–present)
- Children: 1

Leon Preston Robinson (born March 8, 1962), usually credited as simply Leon, is an American actor and singer, who began professional acting as a film actor in the early 1980s. He is best known for his roles as J.T. Matthews in the 1991 Robert Townsend film The Five Heartbeats, Derice Bannock in the 1993 film Cool Runnings, Shep in the 1994 basketball drama film Above the Rim, singer David Ruffin in the 1998 NBC miniseries The Temptations, and Little Richard in the 2000 film Little Richard.

== Career ==
Leon appeared in a 1989 episode of the NBC series Midnight Caller, in which he played an athlete who falls victim to crack cocaine. He also co-starred in the 1989 ABC miniseries The Women of Brewster Place, as the boyfriend of a suburbanite (played by Robin Givens). He was cast as Saint Martin de Porres in Madonna's controversial 1989 music video "Like a Prayer".

Leon's early film roles included a football teammate of Tom Cruise in All the Right Moves (1983) as Shadow Nading, and the Notre Dame-bound basketball-playing co-worker of Matt Dillon, in The Flamingo Kid (1984). He co-starred in the Michael Mann-produced Tri-Star Pictures film Band of the Hand, as well as the "Killer Bee" in the Dennis Hopper-directed gang film Colors, starring Sean Penn and Robert Duvall. After his exposure in the 1989 video for the song "Like a Prayer" by Madonna, he played a leading role in the 1993 Disney film Cool Runnings. That same year, he co-starred as John Lithgow's henchman in Renny Harlin's Cliffhanger and followed with a turn as a disillusioned ex-jock in New Line Cinema's Above the Rim (1994). Leon also appeared as Lela Rochon's married lover in 1995's Waiting to Exhale directed by Forest Whitaker and starring Whitney Houston. He had a starring role in the Merchant/Ivory produced movie Side Streets with Rosario Dawson. He produced as well as starred in the 1997 romantic drama The Price of Kissing with TV star Pauley Perrette. He also starred in the movie Once Upon a Time... When We Were Colored, directed by Tim Reid and winner of Best Picture at the NAACP Image Awards.

Leon has received critical acclaim for his portrayal of three singers: David Ruffin in the 1998 NBC miniseries The Temptations, Little Richard in the self-titled 2000 NBC movie biography, and JT in the 20th Century Fox movie The Five Heartbeats, directed by Robert Townsend. Leon received an Emmy nomination for his portrayal of Little Richard. During this period, he joined the ensemble cast of two TV series, playing the popular Jefferson Keane on HBO's first series, Oz, and as Lawrence Hill on Showtime's Resurrection Blvd.. He co-starred as "Stoney", best friend of Joaquin Phoenix, in Miramax's military drama Buffalo Soldiers and had an uncredited role as "Joseph 13 X" in Michael Mann's award-winning biopic, Ali, starring Will Smith.

Leon briefly hosted his own late-night talk show, The L-Bow Room, on BET.

In 2008, he starred in the 20th Century Fox thriller Cover, directed by Bill Duke, and starred alongside Danny Masterson and Dominique Swain in the indie comedy The Brooklyn Heist, directed by Julian Mark Kheel.

In 2009, AOL Black Voices voted Leon one of the Sexiest Actors of All Time.

Between 2013 and 2014, he appeared in four movies, the romantic comedy I Really Hate My Ex, written and directed by Troy Beyer; the southern drama Soul Ties, based on the book by Tee Austin; the indie rock/drama 37; and the romantic drama And Then There Was You with Garcelle Beauvais.

=== Theater ===
In theater, Leon has headlined three national tours, with sold-out performances at Hollywood's Kodak Theatre, NYC's Beacon Theatre, Detroit's Fox Theater, Washington, DC's Warner Theater. These tours were of Friends and Lovers (2005), based on Eric Jerome Dickey's New York Times bestselling book; of 3 Ways to Get A Husband (2009 and 2010), as a soldier returning from Iraq, co-starring Billy Dee Williams; and the revival of Why Do Good Girls Like Bad Boys (2012).

=== Music ===
Leon is the lead vocalist and songwriter of the band Leon and the Peoples. In 2007, he received an International Reggae and World Music Award nomination for the band's debut CD, The Road Less Traveled. He won Best International Artist at the Joe Higgs Reggae Awards. He completed a 36 city US tour with reggae greats Beres Hammond and Marcia Griffiths, titled the "For The Love Of It Tour". He was a frequent guest on Beres Hammond's 2008 and 2010 North American tours. He headlined NYC's Central Park 2010 and 2013 AIDS Walk concerts. Other performances include the 2011 Aspen Jazz Festival, 2012 Catalpa NYC Music Festival, New Orleans Music Festival, Chicago's Festival Of Life, Reggae on River, Jamaica's Rebel Salute, and BET's popular 106 & Park.

Leon and the Peoples' single "Love Is A Beautiful Thing'" was featured on the BET/Centric TV show Culture List, which premiered on July 21, 2013. The band's second album, Love Is A Beautiful Thing, was released on the Spectra Music label on July 20, 2018, with the title track debuting at No. 3 on Billboard's Hot Singles Chart, and the next single, "Beautiful" appearing on the same chart at No. 12.

== Personal life ==
Robinson is of Jamaican descent. He was previously in a relationship with model, actress, and reality television personality Cynthia Bailey, with whom he shares a daughter. He is an honorary member of Phi Beta Sigma fraternity.

== Filmography ==
=== Film ===
Year	Title	Role	Notes
1983	All the Right Moves	Austin "Shadow" Williams	
1984	Sole Survivor	Gang Leader	
1984	The Flamingo Kid	Fortune Smith	
1985	Streetwalkin'	Jason	
1986	Band of the Hand	Moss	
1987	The Father Clements Story	Ice	TV movie
1988	The Lawless Land	Road Kill	
1988	Colors	Killer Bee	
1989	Flying Blind	Larry Brown	TV movie
1989	A Mother's Courage: The Mary Thomas Story	Michael Thomas	TV movie
1991	The Five Heartbeats	J.T. Matthews	
1993	Cliffhanger	Kynette	
1993	Cool Runnings	Derice Bannock	credited as Leon
1993	Bad Attitude	Eddie Johnson	TV movie
1994	Above the Rim	Shep	
1995	Once Upon a Time... When We Were Colored	Uncle Melvin	
1995	Waiting to Exhale	Russell	
1996	Spirit Lost	John	
1996	Pure Danger	Felix	Video
1997	Runaway Car	Officer Isaiah 'Beau' Beaufort	TV movie
1997	B*A*P*S	Leon	
1997	The Price of Kissing	Larry	
1998	Side Streets	Errol Boyce	
1999	Friends & Lovers	Manny	
1999	Mean Streak	Altman Rogers	TV movie
1999	Bats	Jimmy Sands	
1999	Mr. Rock 'n' Roll: The Alan Freed Story	Jackie Wilson	
2000	Little Richard	Little Richard	TV movie
2001	Buffalo Soldiers	Stoney	
2001	Ali	Joe Simmons	
2002	Four Faces of God	Jah	Short
2005	Get Rich or Die Tryin'	Slim	
	Friends and Lovers	Tyrel	
2006	The Tested	Curtis	Short
2006	Ways of the Flesh	Dr. Lee	
2007	Cover	Ryan Chambers	
2008	The Brooklyn Heist	Ronald	
2009	3 Ways to Get a Husband	Devon	Video
2011	The Heart Specialist	Dr. Lee	
2012	From This Day Forward	Deon	TV movie
2013	Je'Caryous Johnson's Marriage Material	Michael	
2013	Someone to Love	Joshua Gilbert	
2014	37: A Final Promise	Dr. Koehm	
2015	Ex-Free	Sean	
2015	Against the Jab	DJ Mike	
2015	Where Children Play	David Mccain	
2015	Soul Ties	Dale Sr	
2016	The Rhythm and the Blues	Eddie Taylor Sr.	Short
2016	Love Had Everything to Do with It	-	
2017	The Cheaters Club	James	
2018	Make America Black Again	Candidate Johnson	Short
2018	Her Only Choice	Melvin	
2018	Before You Say I Do Live!	Edward	
2020	The Glorias	Frank	
2020	The Sin Choice	Doug Stephens	
2020	Time for Us to Come Home for Christmas	Jasper Penderson	TV movie
2022	A Day to Die	Tyrone Pettis	
2023	First Lady of BMF: The Tonesa Welch Story	Emerson	

=== Television ===
Year	Title	Role	Notes
1982	Making the Grade	-	Episode: "Pilot"
1982	CBS Schoolbreak Special	Bobby Joe Tucker	Episode: "Journey to Survival"
1987	Houston Knights	Scarecrow	Episode: "Scarecrow"
1989	The Women of Brewster Place	Abshu	Episode: "Part 1 & 2"
1989	Midnight Caller	Nathan 'Skate' Fillmore	Episode: "The Fall"
1989	Hunter	Iceman	Episode: "Investment in Death"
1990	L.A. Law	Ronald 'Pinto' Sewell	Episode: "Blood, Sweat and Fears"
1995	Central Park West	Gabe Sands	Recurring cast: Season 1
1997	Oz	Jefferson Keane	Recurring cast: Season 1
1997–98	C-16: FBI	Robert Robinson	Recurring cast
1998	The Temptations	David Ruffin	Episode: "Part 1 & 2"
2001	Resurrection Blvd.	Lawrence Hill	Recurring cast: Season 2
2003	Oz	Jefferson Keane	Episode: "Dead Man Talking"
2003	Crossing Jordan	Detective Vicellous Owens	Episode: "Sunset Division"
2003	Hack	Ulysses Sims	Episode: "To Have and Have Not"
2004	The L-Bow Room	Himself/Host	Main Host
2004	Super Secret Movie Rules	Himself	Episode: "Sports Underdogs"
2009–11	Diary of a Single Mom	Lawrence Hill	Recurring cast
2011	Are We There Yet?	Dr. Harvey Cleveland	Episode: "The Compatibility Test Episode"
2011	Reed Between the Lines	Don	Episode: "Let's Talk About Affairs"
2016	Recovery Road	Alan	Recurring cast
2017	Unsung Hollywood	Himself	Episode: "Tupac Shakur"
2018	Rel	Nickels	Episode: "Re-Enter the Dragons"
2018	40 and Single	Dan Mayor	Main cast
2018–19	Blue Bloods	Cameron Gooding	Guest cast: Season 9-10
2021	A Luv Tale: The Series	George Montgomery	Recurring cast
2021	Games People Play	Walter King	Recurring cast: Season 2
2021–22	City on a Hill	Reverend Isaiah Hughes	Recurring cast: Season 2, Guest: Season 3
2023	Swarm	Harris	Episode: "Girl, Bye"
2023–24	The Chi	Alonzo	Recurring role; season 6
