= Little Richard (film) =

2000 biographical mini-series directed by Robert Townsend

- Genre: Biography, drama
- Written by: Bill Kerby; Daniel Taplitz
- Directed by: Robert Townsend
- Starring: Leon; Jenifer Lewis; Carl Lumbly; Tamala Jones; Mel Jackson; Garrett Morris
- Theme music composer: Velton Ray Bunch
- Country of origin: United States
- Original language: English

Production
- Producer: Iain Peterson
- Editors: Sabrina Plisco; Marcelo Sansevieri
- Running time: 120 minutes

Original release
- Network: NBC
- Release: February 20, 2000

Little Richard is a 2000 American biographical television film written by Bill Kerby and Daniel Taplitz and directed by Robert Townsend. The film premiered on NBC on February 20, 2000. Based on the 1984 book, Quasar of Rock: The Life and Times of Little Richard, it chronicles the rise of American musical icon Little Richard from his poor upbringing in Macon, Georgia to achieving superstardom as one of the pioneers of rock and roll music and his conflicts between his religion and secular lifestyle, which leads to an early retirement following a 1957 tour of Australia, and later a comeback to secular performing during a concert in London in 1962.

The cast includes Leon as Little Richard Penniman, Jenifer Lewis as Richard's mother Leva Mae, or as she's listed in the movie credits, Muh Penniman, Carl Lumbly as Richard's stern father, Charles "Bud" Penniman, Tamala Jones as Richard's girlfriend Lucille (actually Audrey Robinson), Garrett Morris as Richard's preacher Carl Rainey and Mel Jackson as producer Robert "Bumps" Blackwell.

For his role as Penniman, Leon earned nominations for Best Actor in the Black Reel Awards and the NAACP Image Awards.

== Awards and nominations ==
- Black Reel Awards
  - Nominated (Network/Cable - Best Actor) - Leon
- NAACP Image Awards
  - Nominated (Outstanding Actor in a Television Movie, Mini-Series or Dramatic Special) - Leon
- Emmy Awards
  - Nominated (Outstanding Music Direction) - David Sibley
