= Shag (film) =

1988 film by Zelda Barron

- Theatrical release poster
- Directed by: Zelda Barron
- Screenplay by: Robin Swicord; Lanier Laney; Terry Sweeney
- Story by: Lanier Laney; Terry Sweeney
- Produced by: Stephen Woolley; Julia Chasman
- Starring: Phoebe Cates; Scott Coffey; Bridget Fonda; Annabeth Gish; Page Hannah; Robert Rusler; Tyrone Power Jr.
- Cinematography: Peter MacDonald
- Edited by: Laurence Méry-Clark
- Production company: Palace Pictures
- Distributed by: Hemdale Film Corporation (United States); Palace Pictures (United Kingdom)
- Release dates: August 12, 1988 (United Kingdom); July 21, 1989 (United States)
- Running time: 98 minutes
- Countries: United States; United Kingdom
- Language: English
- Budget: $5 million
- Box office: $9 million (US/UK)

Shag (also known as Shag: The Movie) is a 1988 teen romantic comedy film directed by Zelda Barron and starring Phoebe Cates, Scott Coffey, Bridget Fonda, Annabeth Gish, Page Hannah, Robert Rusler, and Tyrone Power Jr. Set in 1963, the film follows four teenage girls who spend their last weekend together in Myrtle Beach, South Carolina, before one of the girls gets married. The film features Carolina shag dancing and was produced in cooperation with the South Carolina Film Commission.

An international co-production between the United States and the United Kingdom, Shag was released in the UK on August 12, 1988, by Palace Pictures and in the US on July 21, 1989, by Hemdale Film Corporation.

== Plot ==
In the summer of 1963, recent high school graduates Melaina Buller, Caroline Carmichael, and Luanne Clatterbuck pick up their friend Carson McBride for a weekend getaway to Myrtle Beach, South Carolina, to show her a good time before her wedding and to escape their parents. Melaina is the fun-loving daughter of a local preacher with dreams of Hollywood stardom; Caroline, nicknamed "Pudge", is self-conscious about her weight; Luanne is the straight-laced daughter of a conservative senator; and Carson is engaged to her high school sweetheart, Harley Ralston.

The girls arrive at Luanne's parents' beach house. That night, they go to the Pavilion, where local boys Buzz Ravenal and Chip Guillyard approach Carson and Pudge. Although Carson tells Buzz she is engaged, he convinces her to dance with him. Melaina attracts a man named "Big Bob", drawing the ire of local girls Suette and Nadine. After overhearing Suette discussing plans to compete in the Miss Sun Queen Pageant the following day, Melaina vows to beat her. Melaina leaves the Pavilion with Big Bob, while Carson and Pudge leave with Buzz and Chip, leaving Luanne behind.

At a secluded parking spot, Melaina, who is a virgin, rejects Big Bob's sexual advances. Melaina is then attacked by Suette and Nadine, who spray her with shaving cream and force her to drink alcohol, before Luanne comes to her rescue. At a drive-in restaurant, Pudge teaches Chip to dance the shag while Buzz flirts with Carson, eventually kissing her. Later that night, Carson calls to tell Harley that she is in Myrtle Beach and that nothing happened.

The next morning, Pudge gives Chip dance lessons, and Buzz takes Carson fishing. Upon finding Melaina practicing her beauty pageant dance routine in a bikini, Luanne persuades her to instead wear a modest one-piece bathing suit and recite a monologue from Gone with the Wind. On the beach, Pudge and Chip ask each other questions from a quiz about sex and relationships, and they reveal they are both virgins. On a dock, Buzz declares that he does not believe Carson will marry Harley, and they kiss.

At the Miss Sun Queen Pageant, where popular singer Jimmy Valentine is serving as a guest judge, Suette wins by performing a provocative dance in a Confederate flag bikini. When Harley arrives unexpectedly, Luanne distracts him while Carson and Buzz flee. Melaina blames Luanne for losing the pageant and has her use her senator father's name to invite Jimmy back to the beach house for a party.

At the party, Chip asks Pudge to be his partner in the shag contest the next day, and she accepts, but he later upsets her by saying he considers her a friend. Luanne bonds with Harley while Carson and Buzz sneak out of the house. Melaina briefly holds Jimmy's attention before he grows bored. At Melaina's urging, Chip invites a large number of locals over to the party. Meanwhile, Buzz takes Carson to Luanne's father's yacht and they sleep together.

In the morning, the Clatterbucks' maid arrives and tells Luanne that her parents are due to arrive at noon. Jimmy's manager arrives to retrieve his client, and Melaina becomes determined to impress the manager. Carson returns to the house and tells her friends that she lost her virginity to Buzz. Luanne sends Chip to pick up her parents and drive them to the Pavilion, where they are set to judge the shag contest. Pudge takes Melaina to the Pavilion to meet with Jimmy's manager and encounters Chip; they kiss and enter the contest.

Carson, Luanne, Buzz, and Harley arrive at the Pavilion. Luanne invents a story to tell her parents, but Carson urges her to tell the truth. Carson tells Harley she cannot marry him because she is in love with Buzz, and Luanne blurts out they had sex. Harley tries to punch Buzz but hits a mirror instead. Pudge and Chip win the contest and agree to stay in touch while he attends Annapolis; Melaina impresses Jimmy's manager, who agrees to take her on as a client; Luanne and Harley flirt; and Buzz invites Carson to visit him at Yale University.

== Cast ==
- Phoebe Cates as Carson McBride
- Scott Coffey as Chip Guillyard
- Bridget Fonda as Melaina Buller
- Annabeth Gish as Caroline "Pudge" Carmichael
- Page Hannah as Luanne Clatterbuck
- Robert Rusler as Buzz Ravenel
- Tyrone Power Jr. as Harley Ralston
- Jeff Yagher as Jimmy Valentine
- Paul Lieber as the manager
- Donald Craig as Senator Clatterbuck
- Shirley Anne Field as Mrs. Clatterbuck
- Leilani Sarelle as Suette
- Carrie Hamilton as Nadine

== Soundtrack ==
The original soundtrack album was released by Sire/Warner Bros. Records on August 2, 1989. It was available on vinyl, cassette and CD.

1. "The Shag" – Tommy Page
2. "I'm in Love Again" – Randy Newman
3. "Our Day Will Come" – k.d. lang and The Reclines
4. "Ready to Go Steady" – The Charmettes
5. "Shaggin' on the Grand Strand" – Hank Ballard
6. "Oh What a Night" – The Moonlighters
7. "Saved" – LaVern Baker
8. "I'm Leaving It All Up to You" – LaVern Baker, Ben E. King
9. "Surrender" – Louise Goffin
10. "Diddley Daddy" – Chris Isaak

== Home media ==
The initial VHS home video version was released in 1989. However, legal copyright infringements led to VHS re-releases on June 3, 1997 and January 13, 1998 that features different songs, or no music at all in some scenes compared to the original theatrical release. The 1997 home video version has a box cover almost identical to the theatrical poster, while the modified copyright-compliant version has different cover artwork.

Shag was released on Region 1 DVD on May 22, 2001. The Blu-ray of the movie was released on June 27, 2017, by Olive Films.

== Reception ==
Shag grossed £1.1 million ($1.8 million) in the United Kingdom. It grossed $6.9 million at the U.S. box office.

The film received mixed to positive reviews from critics. On the review aggregator website Rotten Tomatoes, the film holds an approval rating of 65% based on 17 reviews, with an average rating of 6.1/10.

Stephen Holden of The New York Times wrote that Shag, "a teen-age nostalgia film set in the summer of 1963, suggests a frothy female answer to Barry Levinson's Diner, with a Southern twist." Roger Ebert, who gave the film three out of four stars, praised the actors of the film, calling them "best of the younger generation in Hollywood, and they treat their material with the humor and delicacy it deserves."

TV Guide complimented the actors, calling them "uniformly attractive and energetic" performers who can "deliver performances that range from likable to delicious." The Austin Chronicle wrote Bridget Fonda's "portrayal of the bad-girl preacher's daughter ... steals the show." Margaret Moser, also of the Chronicle, wrote a retrospective review stating "the cast and acting raise this ultimately charming film from sleeper to cult status without stooping to pointless sex or nudity."

Sheila Benson of the Los Angeles Times gave a positive review, writing "Named for a particularly Southern dance craze, Shag is an artfully directed, frequently funny and carefully observed story" and praised the dance sequence, which was choreographed by Kenny Ortega.
