= The Lawless Land =

- Directed by: Jon Hess
- Screenplay by: Tony Cinciripini; Larry Leahy
- Story by: Tony Cinciripini
- Produced by: Tony Cinciripini; Larry Leahy
- Starring: Jsu Garcia; Amanda Peterson; Leon Robinson; Xander Berkeley
- Cinematography: Ted Chu; Makoto Watanabe
- Edited by: Bernard Caputo; Steven Kane; Stephen Mark
- Music by: Lucia Hwong
- Release date: January 1988
- Running time: 81 minutes
- Country: United States
- Language: English

The Lawless Land is a 1988 American science fiction adventure film directed by Jon Hess and starring Jsu Garcia, Amanda Peterson, Leon Robinson and Xander Berkeley.

== Cast ==
- Jsu Garcia as Falco
- Leon Robinson as Road Kill
- Xander Berkeley as Ez Andy
- Amanda Peterson as Diana
- Patricio Bunster as Don Enrique
- Patricia Rivadeneira as Snake Woman
- Javier Maldonado as Warden
- Douglas Hubner as Chairman's Butler
