= My Bodyguard =

1980 film by Tony Bill

- Theatrical release poster
- Directed by: Tony Bill
- Written by: Alan Ormsby
- Produced by: Melvin Simon; Don Devlin
- Starring: Chris Makepeace; Ruth Gordon; Matt Dillon; John Houseman; Craig Richard Nelson; Kathryn Grody; Adam Baldwin; Martin Mull
- Cinematography: Michael D. Margulies
- Edited by: Stu Linder
- Music by: Dave Grusin
- Production company: Melvin Simon Productions
- Distributed by: 20th Century Fox
- Release dates: July 11, 1980 (Limited); August 15, 1980 (Wide)
- Running time: 96 minutes
- Country: United States
- Language: English
- Budget: $3 million
- Box office: $22.5 million

My Bodyguard is a 1980 American family comedy drama film directed by Tony Bill (his directorial debut), and written by Alan Ormsby. The film stars Chris Makepeace, Adam Baldwin, Matt Dillon, Martin Mull, and Ruth Gordon. The film was the debut of both Baldwin and an uncredited Jennifer Beals and was Joan Cusack's first major film.

== Plot ==
Clifford Peache lives in an upscale Chicago luxury hotel with his father, the hotel manager, and his grandmother. He is new to Fleer High School and arrives each day in a hotel limousine. Clifford is targeted by a gang of bullies led by Melvin Moody that extorts money from students to protect them from Ricky Linderman. According to school legend, Linderman has killed several people, including his own little brother. Dubious, Clifford asks a teacher who tells him the only violence she's aware of from Ricky's past was when he discovered the dead body of his nine-year-old brother, who accidentally shot himself playing alone with a gun.

Clifford asks Ricky to be his bodyguard. He refuses, but a friendship develops. Ricky saves Clifford from a beating by Moody's gang. Still affected by his brother's death, Ricky is slow to trust Clifford. When Ricky shows Clifford the motorcycle he has passionately been rebuilding, Clifford helps Ricky search junkyards for a hard-to-find engine cylinder. Their relationship brings Ricky out of his shell, and more classmates come to disbelieve the rumors about him. Moody's gang approaches Clifford, Ricky, and others as they eat lunch in Lincoln Park. Moody is accompanied by an older bodybuilder named Mike who he's hired to be his bodyguard. They try to provoke Ricky into a fight, vandalize his motorcycle, and push it into the lagoon. Ricky runs away, ashamed and angry, and later appears at Clifford's hotel. He asks for money and leaves. Clifford follows him and during an argument, Ricky admits it was he who accidentally shot his brother with their father's gun, and lied about it. Guilty and remorseful, Ricky boards a subway train and leaves Clifford behind.

Moody returns to the park to bully Clifford and his friends, while Ricky retrieves his motorcycle from the lagoon. Moody demands the motorcycle, but Ricky refuses. Mike is summoned to physically intimidate Ricky and they engage in a long fistfight. Ricky knocks Mike out, despite Moody's attempt to intervene, and Moody and Clifford have their own fight. Ricky coaches Clifford, who has no experience fighting. Clifford manages to land several solid punches on the overconfident Moody, ultimately breaking his nose and humiliating him. Ricky retrieves his motorcycle, and jokingly asks Clifford to be his bodyguard as they leave with their friends.

== Cast ==
- Adam Baldwin as Ricky Linderman
- Chris Makepeace as Clifford Peache
- Ruth Gordon as Gramma Peache
- Matt Dillon as Melvin Moody
- Martin Mull as Mr. Larry C. Peache
- John Houseman as Dobbs
- Craig Richard Nelson as Griffith
- Kathryn Grody as Ms. Clarice Jump
- Paul Quandt as Carson
- Richard Bradley as Dubrow
- Tim Reyna as Koontz
- Dean R. Miller as Hightower
- Richard Cusack as Principal Roth
- Joan Cusack as Shelley
- Hank Salas as Mike
- Patrick Billingsley as biology teacher
- Tim Kazurinsky as workman
- George Wendt as air conditioning engineer
- Jennifer Beals (uncredited) as Shelley's friend
- Bruce Jarchow as hotel limo driver Roberto
- Laurie McEathron as cheerleader

== Production ==
The film was shot on location in Chicago with Lake View High School providing the setting for the film's fictional Fleer H.S. The hotel that Clifford lives in and which is managed by his father is the real life Ambassador East (now known as the Ambassador Hotel) at 1301 North State Parkway.

== Release and reception ==
My Bodyguard opened on July 11, 1980, in limited release, and wide release on August 15, 1980. In its limited weekend, the film opened at #3 with $178,641 and went on to gross $22,482,953 in the United States.

The film was named as one of the top ten films of 1980 by National Board of Review. It was also nominated by the Writers Guild of America for Best Drama Written Directly for the Screen, and in his analysis of the 53rd Academy Awards, Gary Arnold of The Washington Post wrote that My Bodyguard was unfairly snubbed when it failed to receive an Oscar nomination for Best Original Screenplay.

The film ranked No. 45 on Entertainment Weekly's list of the 50 Best High School Movies.

The film received generally positive reviews; on review aggregator website Rotten Tomatoes, 79% of 34 critics gave the film a positive review (with an average rating of 6.8/10) and the site's critics' consensus reading, "T. Bill debuts as an affectionate director, keenly aware of growing pains."

== Home media ==
The film was released on DVD on January 29, 2002, and also was released on Blu-ray on September 6, 2016.
