= The Hunt (2006 film) =

2006 film by Fritz Kiersch

- Film poster
- Directed by: Fritz Kiersch
- Starring: Joe Michael Burke
- Release date: 2006 (Oklahoma City Museum of Art)
- Running time: 90 minutes
- Country: United States
- Language: English

The Hunt is a 2006 film directed by Fritz Kiersch. It stars Joe Michael Burke and Cliff De Young and is about two hunters and a boy who, while on a hunting trip, discover aliens.

== Cast ==
- Joe Michael Burke as Jack Hamberg
- Cliff De Young as John Kraw
- Mitchell Burns as Clint
- Robert Rusler as Atticus Monroe
- Amy Briede as Tessa Kraw Hamberg

== Release ==
The film premiered at the Oklahoma City Museum of Art in 2006.

The film was later released on DVD on March 12, 2007.
