= David Stenstrom =

American actor (born 1953)

- Born: David Lee Stenstrom; November 10, 1953 (age 71)
- Other names: David Stentstrom
- Occupation(s): Voice, film, television actor
- Years active: 1984–present
- Spouse: Maxine Cameron

David Lee Stenstrom (a.k.a. David Stentstrom born November 10, 1953) is an American actor. He has appeared in various shows, the best known of those roles perhaps being his work with Saban, which includes being the voice of King Mondo in Power Rangers Zeo and Hal Stewart in Masked Rider. Stenstrom has also made guest appearances on many television shows throughout his career, including General Hospital, Doogie Howser, M.D., Full House and Murder, She Wrote. He was also known for his role as Waldo the inventor on the Nickelodeon show, Out of Control.

== TV roles ==
- Doogie Howser, M.D. - Todd ("Dangerous Reunions")
- Full House - Security Guard ("Up on the Roof")
- Gabriel's Fire - Studio Guard ("Postcards from the Faultline")
- General Hospital - Neil Johnson (1986)
- Grounded for Life - Bitter Man ("The Kids Are Alright")
- Homefront - NLRB Representative ("All These Things Will I Give Thee")
- The King of Queens - Bill Davies ("Roast Chicken")
- Masked Rider - Hal Stewart
- Murder, She Wrote
  - Photographer ("Something Borrowed, Someone Blue")
  - Husband ("The Fixer-Upper")
  - Budding Comic ("Where Have You Gone, Billy Boy?")
  - Craps Player ("Love and Hate in Cabot Cove")
- Out of Control
  - Treehouse Builder #2 ("Hurry-Up")
  - Waldo
- Providence - Cop ("The Thanksgiving Story", parts 1 and 2)
- Reasonable Doubts - Blatchley ("Graduation Day")
- Sisters - Customer ("Teach Your Children Well")

== Movie roles ==
- Acts of Betrayal - Wally Fenster
- Critters - Pool Player #2
- Project X - Lt. Durschlag

== Voice-over roles ==
- Power Rangers Zeo - King Mondo
- Power Rangers in Space - King Mondo ("Countdown to Destruction"; uncredited)
- Power Rangers Lightspeed Rescue
  - Demonite ("Ryan's Destiny", "Curse of the Cobra")
  - Demonite Clone ("Curse of the Cobra")
- Power Rangers Time Force
  - Narrator ("Force from the Future, Part 1"; uncredited)
  - Fearog ("Ransik Lives")

== Live appearances ==
- In August 2010, Stenstrom appeared at the second Power Morphicon convention in Pasadena, California. Then in August 2012, he appeared at the third convention.
