= Hell Hath No Fury (film) =

- Genre: Thriller; Drama
- Based on: Smithereens by B.W. Battin
- Written by: Beau Bensink
- Directed by: Thomas J. Wright
- Starring: Barbara Eden; Loretta Swit; David Ackroyd; Amanda Peterson; Kim Zimmer; Richard Kline
- Music by: J. Peter Robinson
- Country of origin: United States
- Original language: English

Production
- Executive producers: Sheldon Pinchuk; Bill Finnegan
- Producer: Pat Finnegan
- Cinematography: Frank Beascoechea
- Editor: Scott Eyler
- Running time: 97 minutes
- Production companies: Bar-Gene Productions; Finnegan Pinchuk Company

Original release
- Network: NBC
- Release: March 4, 1991

Hell Hath No Fury is a 1991 American made-for-television thriller-drama film starring Barbara Eden and Loretta Swit about a housewife who is simultaneously framed for her husband's murder and terrorized by the deranged woman who killed him. The film was directed by Thomas J. Wright and written by Beau Bensink based on the novel Smithereens by B.W. Battin. It originally premiered on NBC Monday Night at the Movies on March 4, 1991.

== Summary ==
Terri Ferguson (Barbara Eden) is a housewife married to well-known and respected businessman Stanley (David Ackroyd) who also has an estranged relationship with her college aged daughter Michelle (Amanda Peterson), and she's still feeling the empty nest syndrome. Terri's perfect world is shattered when her husband is brutally murdered and thus begins a terrifying ordeal where Terri finds herself the prime suspect in her husband's murder and becomes the helpless victim of Connie Stewart (Loretta Swit), a deranged woman and ex-college rival of Terri's who is the real murderer and was Stanley's ex-lover. She blames Terri for stealing Stanley away from her years ago and plots a psychotic revenge against her. Although the police are determined to convict Terri, and with no one else to turn to, she must do battle alone against Connie.

== Cast ==
- Barbara Eden as Terri Ferguson
- Loretta Swit as Connie Stewart
- David Ackroyd as Stanley Ferguson
- Amanda Peterson as Michelle Ferguson
- Kim Zimmer as Marlene
- Richard Kline as Milton
- Stephen Lee as Bruce Gossitter
- Vernee Watson-Johnson as Tyleen
- John Marshall Jones as Johnson
- Jim Haynie as Cantrell
- Chanell Wright as Jill
- Mark Arthur Miller as Jack
- Mallory Millett as Alice
- Ellen Dostal as Mary Ann McCabe
- Natalie Core as Mrs. Stewart
- Robert Rockwell as Mr. Stewart
- Donald Craig as The Minister
- Susan Wolf as Landlady
- Rochelle Parker as The Receptionist
- Tom Durkin as Deputy
- Sam Kuglen as Desk Sergeant
- Steven A. Hite as Police Officer (uncredited)
