= Fritz Kiersch =

American film director

- Born: George Keith Kiersch; July 23, 1951 (age 75); Alpine, Texas, U.S.
- Education: Ohio Wesleyan University
- Occupations: Film director, screenwriter

George Keith "Fritz" Kiersch (born in Alpine, Texas) is an American film director, writer and, producer.

He is perhaps best known for directing the horror film Children of the Corn and the James Spader drama Tuff Turf.

Kiersch founded the production company, Kirby/Kiersch Film Group, with Terrence Kirby in 1981.

== Filmography ==
=== Director ===
- 1984 Children of the Corn
- 1985 Tuff Turf
- 1987 Winners Take All
- 1987 Gor
- 1989 Under the Boardwalk
- 1990 Fatal Charm (video) (as Alan Smithee)
- 1990 Swamp Thing (TV series)
- 1992 Into the Sun
- 1994 Shattered Image (TV movie)
- 1995 The Stranger
- 1997 Crayola Kids Adventures: Tales of Gulliver's Travels (video)
- 2006 Surveillance
- 2006 The Hunt
