= Power Rangers Zeo =

American superhero television series from 1996

- Genre: Action; Adventure; Science fantasy Superhero
- Created by: Haim Saban; Toei Company
- Based on: Chouriki Sentai Ohranger by Toei Company
- Developed by: Saban Entertainment; Toei Company
- Showrunners: Ann Austen; Doug Sloan
- Directed by: Isaac Florentine; Vickie Bronaugh; Robert Radler; Douglas Sloan; Terence H. Winkless; Koichi Sakamoto; Larry Litton
- Starring: Catherine Sutherland; Nakia Burrise; Steve Cardenas; Johnny Yong Bosch; Jason David Frank; Austin St. John; David Yost; Paul Schrier; Jason Narvy; Richard Genelle
- Opening theme: "Go Go Power Rangers" (Zeo Version) by Ron Wasserman
- Composers: Shuki Levy; Kussa Mahchi; Kenneth Burgomaster; Jim Cushinery; Jeremy Sweet; Ron Wasserman
- Countries of origin: United States; Japan
- Original language: English
- No. of episodes: 50

Production
- Executive producers: Haim Saban; Shuki Levy
- Producer: Jonathan Tzachor
- Production locations: California (Greater Los Angeles Area) (Santa Clarita & Los Angeles); Japan (Greater Tokyo Area) (Tokyo, Saitama, Yokohama and Kyoto)
- Cinematography: Ilan Rosenberg
- Running time: 20–21 minutes
- Production companies: Saban Entertainment; Renaissance Atlantic Entertainment; Toei Company, Ltd. MMPR Productions, Inc.

Original release
- Network: Fox (Fox Kids)
- Release: April 20 – November 27, 1996

Related
- Power Rangers television series

Power Rangers Zeo is a television series and the fourth entry of the Power Rangers franchise, based on the 19th Super Sentai series Chouriki Sentai Ohranger. It is the continuation of Mighty Morphin Power Rangers and aired in 1996 as the direct sequel to the Mighty Morphin Alien Rangers miniseries. In the Philippines, the series is known as Zeo Rangers.

Power Rangers Zeo is the first season of Power Rangers to follow the Super Sentai practice of annual Ranger suit changes.

== Plot ==
After witnessing the destruction of the Command Center, the powerless Rangers discover the Zeo Crystal intact in the rubble—apparently dropped by Goldar and Rito Revolto. The Crystal guides them to a portal which takes them deep underground to the Power Chamber where they find Zordon and Alpha 5 waiting for them. The Mighty Morphin Power Rangers become the Power Rangers Zeo, a new team of Rangers powered by the Zeo Crystal. The four remaining Mighty Morphin Power Rangers, Tommy Oliver, Adam Park, Rocky DeSantos and Katherine Hillard become Zeo Ranger V — Red, Zeo Ranger IV — Green, Zeo Ranger III — Blue and Zeo Ranger I — Pink respectively and Tanya Sloan joins the team as Zeo Ranger II — Yellow, while Billy Cranston chooses to become their technical advisor rather than continuing as a Ranger.

The Machine Empire, led by King Mondo and Queen Machina, enters Earth's solar system, seeking to conquer Earth, with the Zeo Rangers serving as the only opposition. Many, even Rita Repulsa and Lord Zedd, are forced to flee to the M51 Galaxy under the threat of destruction. Unbeknownst to anyone, Rito and Goldar – now amnesiac – are left behind on Earth. They are taken in by Bulk and Skull, who have them serve as butlers. Meanwhile, Bulk and Skull continue to be members of the Junior Police Force until Lt. Jerome Stone is dismissed when Bulk tries to win the heart of the chief's daughter. Quitting as a show of respect for Stone, they join him at his new detective agency.

Over time, the Machine Empire wears down the five Zeo Rangers, but they are rescued by the mysterious Gold Ranger. Though his identity is unknown, it quickly becomes clear he is there to help the Rangers. After he is injured in battle, it is revealed that the mysterious Gold Ranger is an alien, Trey of Triforia. Split into three separate selves, Trey is forced to temporarily pass his powers to a worthy warrior while healing. They attempt to transfer Trey's powers to Billy, but as Billy acquired excess negative energy during the Command Center's destruction, he is unable to do so. Ultimately the successor is Jason Lee Scott, the first Red Power Ranger and team leader. This event also sees the introduction of the more powerful Super Zeo Zords, which are used against a tougher generation of machines. The Super Zeo Megazord is powerful enough to later destroy King Mondo, creating a power vacuum in the Machine Empire.

Secretly returning from the M51 Galaxy, Lord Zedd and Rita seek to take power again. Operating out of an RV with Finster, they restore Goldar and Rito's memories, retrieving the pair in the process. After King Mondo's death, they launch their first plan, to use Louie Kaboom to take over the Machine Empire. Though he succeeds, he breaks free of Zedd and Rita's control. He embarks on his own plans to conquer Earth and destroy the Zeo Rangers. Louie is eventually killed by King Mondo's first-born son Prince Gasket and his wife Princess Archerina, who rule until King Mondo's reconstruction is complete, which causes them to flee.

When Billy begins rapidly aging as a side-effect of restoring his proper age before undoing Master Vile's spell in the last series, the Zeo and Aquitian Rangers race to help him and fend off monsters from King Mondo as well as Zedd and Rita. Billy leaves Earth for treatment on Aquitar and chooses to stay to be with Cestria. Soon after, it is discovered the Gold Ranger powers are leaving Jason and draining his life force in the process as the alien powers were not meant for a human. Trey is still in recovery, but a risky gamble with the Zeo Crystal heals him, restoring his powers. Rita and Lord Zedd finally get revenge on the Machine Empire by crippling their leaders with a bomb.

== Cast and characters ==
=== Zeo Rangers ===
Power Rangers Zeo

- Jason David Frank as Tommy Oliver
  He is Zeo Ranger V – Red and was previously the Mighty Morphin Green Ranger, the Mighty Morphin White Ranger, and the White Ninja Ranger. He found his Zeo Crystal in the American Southwest. He is the leader of the Zeo Rangers. Tommy wears a red suit with a star-shaped visor on his helmet. He piloted Zeo Zord 5, Super Zeo Zord 5, and the Red Battlezord. His primary weapon was the Zeo Power Sword.
- Johnny Yong Bosch as Adam Park
  He is Zeo Ranger IV – Green and was previously the second Mighty Morphin Black Ranger, and Black Ninja Ranger. He found his Zeo Crystal in Korea. Adam wears a green suit with a rectangular visor. He piloted Zeo Zord Four and Super Zeo Four. His primary weapon was the Zeo Power Hatchets.
- Steve Cardenas as Rocky DeSantos
  He is Zeo Ranger III – Blue and was previously the second Mighty Morphin Red Ranger, and Red Ninja Ranger. He found his Zeo Crystal in Mexico. He served as the team's second-in-command until Jason returned. Rocky wore a blue suit with a triangular visor on his helmet. He piloted Zeo Zord Three and Super Zeo Three. His primary weapon was the Zeo Power Axes.
- Nakia Burrise as Tanya Sloan
  She is Zeo Ranger II – Yellow and the only new member of the core group. When Aisha Campbell, the former Mighty Morphin Yellow Ranger, went for her Zeo Crystal in Africa, she decided that she wanted to help the animals who were sick; so she sent Tanya back with the Zeo Crystal in her place. Initially returning as a child, the Zeo Crystal made Tanya the same age as the other Rangers, which she gradually got used to. Tanya wears a yellow suit with two horizontal lines for a visor on her helmet. She piloted Zeo Zord Two and Super Zeo Two. Her primary weapon was the Zeo Power Clubs.
- Catherine Sutherland as Katherine "Kat" Hillard
  She is Zeo Ranger I – Pink and was previously the second Mighty Morphin Pink Ranger, and the second Pink Ninja Ranger. She found her Zeo Crystal in her homeland of Australia. She is also Tommy Oliver's love interest. Katherine wears a pink suit with a circular visor on her helmet. She piloted Zeo Zord One and Super Zeo One. Her primary weapon was the Zeo Power Shield.

- Brad Hawkins (voice) and Ted, Tim & Tom DiFilippo as Trey of Triforia
  The original Gold Ranger and also the lord of planet Triforia, a place where everyone had identical triplets. He gave the Zeo Rangers their Super Zeo Zords when he had to return to his planet. Trey of Triforia wears a black suit with a golden vest and had a visor shaped like the kanji for "king". He piloted Pyramidas and his primary weapon was the Golden Power Staff.
- Austin St. John as Jason Lee Scott
  The new Gold Ranger and previously the original Mighty Morphin Red Ranger. When Trey of Triforia had to return to his planet, Tommy went and found Jason to take the place of the Gold Ranger while he was gone. He returned to his duties as second-in-command after his return. He piloted Pyramidas and his primary weapon was the Golden Power Staff.

=== Supporting characters ===
- Robert L. Manahan as the voice of Zordon
  The Zeo Rangers' mentor. Zordon serves as a source of vast wisdom and knowledge for the team.
- Richard Steven Horvitz (credited as Richard Wood) as the voice of Alpha 5
  Zordon's robotic assistant, in charge of keeping the Power Chamber working.
- David Yost as Billy Cranston
  The former Mighty Morphin Blue Ranger and Blue Ninja Ranger, Billy has retired from being a Power Ranger, electing to instead assist Alpha.
- Richard Genelle as Ernie
  The owner of the Angel Grove Youth Center and juice bar.
- Paul Schrier and Jason Narvy as Bulk and Skull
  Former bullies who are initially junior police officers and then private detectives.
- Gregg Bullock as Lt./Det. Jerome B. Stone
  Jerome is a police lieutenant who is the supervisor of Bulk and Skull. After Bulk had a crush on his superior's daughter, he was fired. Jerome later became a private investigator with Bulk and Skull still working under him.
- Lesley Tesh-Pedersen as Emily
  A waitress at Ernie's Beach Club and a love interest to Jason.
- Erik Frank as David Truehart
  Tommy's brother, who was adopted by the same Native American (Sam Truehart) Tommy met while retrieving his piece of the Zeo crystal.
- Derek Stephen Prince (uncredited) as the voice of Auric the Conqueror
  An ancient tiki that had been dormant on the tropical Mysterio Island for years.

=== Villains ===
- Machine Empire
  - David Stenstrom as the voice of King Mondo
    The ruler of the Machine Empire.
  - Alex Borstein as the voice of Queen Machina
    The queen of the Machine Empire.
  - Barbara Goodson as the voice of Prince Sprocket
    The son of King Mondo and Queen Machina.
  - Oliver Page as the voice of Klank
    A robot that is loyal to King Mondo and Queen Machina.
  - Barbara Goodson as the voice of Orbus
    A floating module that is paired with Klank. When swung around by Klank, Orbus will make a monster grow.
  - Lex Lang (uncredited) as the voice of Louie Kaboom
    A missile-themed robot that was originally used by Lord Zedd and Rita Repulsa to take control of the Machine Empire following King Mondo's apparent destruction only for Goldar and Rito to lose the remote control. He can transform into his missile form.
  - Douglas Sloan (uncredited) as the voice of Prince Gasket
    Disowned older son of King Mondo and Queen Machina.
  - Melora Harte (uncredited) as the voice of Princess Archerina
    The daughter of King Mondo's arch enemy King Aradon, who eloped with Prince Gasket.
- Evil Space Aliens
  - Robert Axelrod (voice) and Ed Neil as Lord Zedd
    An intergalactic warlord. When the Machine Empire forced them off the Moon, Zedd worked to take revenge on the Machine Empire through whatever way possible.
  - Barbara Goodson (voice) and Carla Perez as Rita Repulsa
    An alien sorceress who became the wife of Lord Zedd. When the Machine Empire forced them off the moon, Rita worked to take revenge on the Machine Empire through whatever way possible.
  - Robert Axelrod as the voice of Finster
    The leprechaun-themed henchman of Rita. After the Machine Empire forced Zedd and Rita off the Moon, Finster was among those who were evacuated. He later returned with Zedd and Rita in a plot to take revenge on the Machine Empire.
  - Kerrigan Mahan as the voice of Goldar
    The manticore-themed minion of Rita Repulsa. He and Rito had amnesia following the Command Center's explosion and were roped into Bulk and Skull's plans until Lord Zedd restored their memories.
  - Bob Papenbrook as the voice of Rito Revolto
    The Gashadokuro-themed brother of Rita.
  - Michael Sorich and Dave Mallow as the voices of Squatt and Baboo
    Squatt is a hobgoblin-like minion of Rita and Baboo is a vampire-like minion of Rita. When the Machine Empire attacked Lord Zedd and Rita Repulsa's castle on the Moon, Squatt and Baboo were evacuated and remained with Master Vile while Lord Zedd and Rita Repulsa worked on ways to get revenge on the Machine Empire.
  - Simon Prescott as the voice of Master Vile
    The father of Rita and Rito. While allowing Rita and Zedd's group to take refuge with him, Master Vile noted that the Machine Empire was worse than he was.

=== Guest stars ===
- Alien Rangers
  Rangers from the planet Aquitar, who helped protect Earth from Zedd and Rita during the events of the previous miniseries. They seek Billy's technological expertise at one point to help defeat new foes, and teach him about their own technology in return; thus creating the Red Battlezord.
- Paul St. Peter (voice) and Koichi Sakamoto (both uncredited) as Tritor
  A part-lizard alien who Bulk and Skull befriend when they are prisoners in the Machine Arena in "A King for a Day".

=== Identity of the Gold Ranger ===
During the middle of the series, the identity of the Gold Ranger was a constant teaser and a central plot theme. After many episodes of speculation, with other characters like Billy Cranston, David Trueheart, and even Eugene Skullovitch suspected, it was revealed the Gold Ranger was Trey of Triforia, a new character. Former Red Ranger, Jason Lee Scott, obtained the powers of the Gold Ranger after Trey lost the ability to transform. Trey was voiced by Brad Hawkins, who played Ryan Steele on VR Troopers and portrayed by Ted, Tim and Tom DiFilippo.

== Episodes ==
No.	Title	Directed by	Written by	Original release date	Prod. code
1	"A Zeo Beginning"	Isaac Florentine	Douglas Sloan	April 20, 1996	344
2	"A Zeo Beginning"	Isaac Florentine	Douglas Sloan	April 23, 1996	345
The teens can hardly believe what they've seen - the Command Center, their sanctuary from the devious Rita Repulsa and Lord Zedd, lies in ruins before them, the fate of their friends Alpha 5 and their mentor Zordon uncertain. It looks like this is indeed the end of the Rangers. But the end is always a new beginning. Meanwhile, Zedd and Rita's celebration comes to a screeching halt when the Machine Empire arrives, intent on conquering Earth. Fleeing for their lives, Zedd and Rita are forced to move in with Master Vile in the M51 Galaxy as Master Vile labels the Machine Empire to be worse than him. Zordon then tells the Rangers that they no longer need fear Zedd and Rita - even they have fled before the terrifying power of the Ranger's new foe. The Machine Empire has arrived and is intent on making Earth their next conquest. Meanwhile, Rito Revolto and Goldar have lost their memories, and are running loose on the streets of Angel Grove. They soon find Bulk and Skull, and in exchange for shelter, Rito and Goldar agree to become their butlers.
3	"The Shooting Star"	Vickie Bronaugh	Jackie Marchand	April 24, 1996	346
Tanya's new boyfriend Shawn has to pass his exams, or he won't be the baseball team's captain anymore. Much to her shock, he plans to cheat... and deep-sixes her, when she not only refuses to help, but threatens to blow the whistle on him. Meanwhile, King Mondo plans to sabotage the new Zeo zords Billy and Alpha are constructing, so that his machine monster Staroid can demolish the city. Note: An uncredited Rio Dekin guest stars as Shawn.
4	"Target Rangers"	Vickie Bronaugh	Stewart St. John	April 25, 1996	347
Rocky's computer science project is challenging...but nowhere near as challenging as his beautiful-but-aloof lab partner, Jennifer. Rocky angles for the computer-savvy ice princess as his date to an upcoming dance, but she won't give him the time of day. It doesn't help when King Mondo and Queen Machina plan to steal Jennifer's project for use in creating a ballistic baddie named Silo. Note: An uncredited Traci Belushi guest stars as Jennifer.
5	"For Cryin' Out Loud"	Robert Radler	Al Winchell	April 27, 1996	348
Tommy Oliver and Katherine must pretend to be married for a school project, during which Katherine brings along Joey - whom she's offered to baby-sit - for the duration of the experiment in an attempt to make things realistic. Joey's crying is driving them nuts, but when King Mondo sends the machine monster Boohoo the Clown to amplify the baby's wail, the effects are devastating. If the Rangers can't get the child to stop crying, he'll lay waste to Angel Grove.
6	"Rangers in the Outfield"	Robert Radler	Brett D. Born	April 29, 1996	349
When Tanya exhibits a natural talent for pitching, it makes Shawn jealous. When she strikes Shawn out, he gets downright hostile and decides to get Rocky and Adam to join him in a little batting practice. This plays right into Prince Sprocket's plans: his fiendish machine monster People Pitcher sucks Rocky in, and it's up to Tommy to get him out before it's too late.
7	"Every Dog Has His Day"	Robert Radler	Mark Hoffmeier	April 30, 1996	350
Katherine trains a dog, Smokey, to help the fire department locate trouble. However, when Smokey's nose sniffs out King Mondo's latest scheme involving the machine monster Digster, Katherine's the one who finds trouble: she has to single-handedly fend off the Machine King's minions without her Zeonizer and a swollen ankle.
8	"The Puppet Blaster"	Isaac Florentine	Stewart St. John	May 1, 1996	351
The Machine Empire targets popular Angel Grove children's show host captain Pete and his friendly robot Puppetman. They convert the bot into a machine monster and use him to brainwash the kids into going on a riot, not to mention acting as human shields when the Zeo Rangers attempt to put a stop to the misdeeds. Meanwhile, Bulk and Skull are forced to watch Lt. Stone's bratty nephew who doesn't need brainwashing to make their life a living nightmare.
9	"Invasion of the Ranger Snatchers"	Isaac Florentine	Gilles Wheeler	May 2, 1996	352
Rocky is star-struck when he, Katherine, and Tanya become extras in a sci-fi film shooting in Angel Grove. The movie-making bug also bites Prince Sprocket, but he decides that what he wants to do is direct...the end of the Rangers that is. He does this by transforming the costumes of Leaky Faucet, Pumpkin Sorcerer, Steambot, and Traffic Kitty into machine monsters as Video Vulture transports the Rangers into his movie dimension.
10	"Graduation Blues"	Isaac Florentine	Mark Litton	May 4, 1996	353
Billy finds out that because of all his extracurricular credit, he's graduating from Angel Grove High early. There's just one problem - Billy has no idea what to do with the rest of his life. It seems like that question is answered for him when Cestro of the Alien Rangers crash-lands on Earth to seek his help. He wants Billy to come to Aquitar with him to help the Aquitans deal with the Hydro-Contaminators. Unfortunately for Cestro, one Hydro-Contaminator has followed him to Earth.
11	"A Few Bad Seeds"	Vickie Bronaugh	Richard Goodman	May 6, 1996	354
Rocky's botany class project gets a little out of hand - the wacky weed eats metal, and grows like - well, a weed. King Mondo sees the potential in the seedling and turns it into the cactus machine monsters Adrian and Pollenator.
12	"Instrument of Destruction"	Vickie Bronaugh	Buzz Alden & Charlotte Fullerton	May 7, 1996	355
The guidance counselor wants Adam and Skull to broaden their studies, so they find themselves in music class, with Skull against his will. As Adam investigates a mysterious piano player, he finds himself in a competition with the machine monster Fotissimodo to see who will find out his identity first.
13	"Mean Screen"	Vickie Bronaugh	Ron Milbauer & Terri Hughes	May 8, 1996	356
In Angel Grove High's new computer lab, Adam and Tanya are getting a guided tour of cyberspace from resident computer whiz Raymond when strange things begin to happen all over town. It seems King Mondo's latest machine monster Mean Screen has crafted the ultimate computer virus, and it's messing up every piece of electronic equipment in Angel Grove - including the Zords.
14	"Mr. Billy's Wild Ride"	Douglas Sloan	Al Winchell	May 11, 1996	357
At long last, Billy is returning from Aquitar, where the Aquitians have found a peaceful solution to their problems with the Hydro-Contaminators. Unfortunately, King Mondo is out to make Billy's life much less peaceful, by throwing his spaceship way off course and making use of his machine monster Mechanizer.
15	"There's No Business Like Snow Business"	Douglas Sloan	Douglas Sloan	May 13, 1996	358
16	"There's No Business Like Snow Business"	Douglas Sloan	Douglas Sloan	May 14, 1996	359
17	"There's No Business Like Snow Business"	Douglas Sloan	Douglas Sloan	May 15, 1996	360
Tommy is depressed when he receives a "Dear John" letter from Kimberly, who was previously the original Mighty Morphin Pink Ranger, saying that she met someone in Florida, so he goes with Katherine and Billy to take some much-needed rest and relaxation on a snowboarding weekend, where he meets snowboarding champion Heather, who develops a crush on him. King Mondo, however, can neither rest nor relax until he has conquered the Earth. To that end, he creates Robocupid, an infernal machine which makes the humans of Angel Grove fall madly in love with machines and electronics. The teens continue their snowboarding weekend, and Tommy and Heather grow closer, but they are called away again. While they are chilling in the mountains, things are heating up in Angel Grove when Mondo sends Defoliator to create a greenhouse effect in Angel Grove. Defoliator appears to be unbeatable when things heat up for the teens. Heather has grown impatient with Tommy's sudden disappearances, but Katherine persuades her to give him another chance and arranges a meal for them at the Angel Grove Youth Center. Sadly, Tommy is called away when the monster attacks the town, and despite Tommy's promise to return, Heather walks out of his life for good. But maybe it isn't such a loss; it turns out Katherine has feelings for Tommy, and he feels the same.: Guest Starring: Sarah Brown as Heather
18	"Inner Spirit"	Robert Radler	Mark Hoffmeier & Mark Litton	May 16, 1996	361
Tommy finds himself having a recurring dream about True of Heart, the man who guided him on his quest for his piece of the Zeo Crystal. When Tommy meets Sam Trueheart, a Native American artist who looks just like the old mystic, he's even more confused. There's no time to ponder this mystery, however, because a more pressing mystery needs to be solved: who or what is sucking all the energy out of Angel Grove? And where is all that energy going? The culprit is King Mondo's machine monster, Main Drain.
19	"Challenges"	Robert Radler	Mark Litton	May 18, 1996	362
Tommy sees a young man in the desert who could be his double. But before Tommy can find out who the young man is, Sam Trueheart appears and tells Tommy that another quest lies before him, and only the end of that quest can reveal the identity of the young man. Meanwhile, Ernie's new boxing ring sparks an interest with Prince Sprocket. Not being the athletic type, Sprocket creates his own Great Metallic Hope; Punch-A-Bunch, who goes toe-to-toe with Adam, capturing the budding boxer and forcing Tommy to face the monster in the ring to save his teammate. It all works out as Tommy finds the solution to his spiritual unrest when he meets a man who claims to be his brother.
20	"Found and Lost"	Robert Radler	Mark Litton & Stewart St. John	May 20, 1996	363
The identity of the young man in Tommy's quest is revealed, and Tommy can scarcely believe it. Meanwhile, Mondo has his plans for the mysterious stranger - plans that will be carried out by his latest creation Mace Face.
21	"Brother, Can You Spare an Arrowhead?"	Terence H. Winkless	Mark Litton	September 9, 1996	401
Tommy must find a way to rescue his brother from a cave of evil spirits while the other Rangers battle Mace Face. Once Mace Face is destroyed, the Rangers must help in defeating the evil spirit Autochthon.
22	"Trust in Me"	Terence H. Winkless	Al Winchell	September 10, 1996	402
Rocky tries to befriend a blind martial artist, but her mistrust keeps him at arm's length. All of the Rangers learn a valuable lesson about trust when King Mondo sends down the scrap metal machine monster Defector to trick them.
23	"It Came from Angel Grove"	Robert Radler	Joseph Kuhr	September 11, 1996	416
Adam finds himself in a fearsome situation when the other Rangers are transformed into classic monster-movie characters where his encounter with Rita and Zedd has them claiming that King Mondo is responsible. They tell him that he needs to claim some items to undo the spell. Tommy is a vampire whose cape gets claimed by Adam. Rocky is a werewolf whose shedded fur Adam finds during the conflict. Bulk is a mummy who Adam unravels to get his bandages. Kat is a witch that was previously in cat form whose necklace gets claimed. When Adam confronts Zordonicus, he ends up having to pair Tommy up against a Quadrafighter and the machine monster Drill Master. Note: This episode was released straight to video on August 20, 1996 before appearing on television. It was also dedicated to Carol Michelle Mickelson, who died on March 29, 1996. She was a young, terminally ill fan who visited the set of the show when this episode was being filmed and died just before it was released.
24	"Bulk Fiction"	Terence H. Winkless	Jackie Marchand	September 12, 1996	403
Bulk gets a crush on the Police Captain's daughter and asks the teen's advice on how to impress her which keeps getting Lt. Stone in trouble with his superior. Meanwhile, the Rangers must face Prince Sprocket's newest toy, Googleheimer the Toy Robot.
25	"Song Sung Yellow"	Robert Radler	Buzz Alden & Charlotte Fullerton	September 13, 1996	404
Tanya is offered a chance at a singing career, but it looks like the Machine Empire might wreck her chances. Tommy in the Red Battlezord squares off against the Wrecking Ball monster.
26	"Game of Honor"	Robert Radler	Brett D. Born	September 16, 1996	405
Adam and Shawn are both training hard for a Kung Fu tournament. But Shawn has a secret weapon. Meanwhile, Bulk and Skull are sent by Detective Stone to investigate why some trees are going down and have an encounter with King Mondo's machine monster Admiral Abominator.
27	"The Power of Gold"	Robert Radler	Al Winchell	September 17, 1996	406
King Mondo's plan to conquer the Rangers with Wolfbane is interrupted by the appearance of a mysterious stranger--who also seems to wield the power of the Zeo Crystal.
28	"A Small Problem"	Vickie Bronaugh	Mark Hoffmeier	September 19, 1996	407
The Rangers must find a way to help their friends when Prince Sprocket shrinks Tommy and Katherine and places them in a terrarium with a hungry tarantula. Once Tommy and Katherine are rescued, the Rangers will have to deal with Tarantabot.
29	"Oily to Bed, Oily to Rise"	Robert Radler	Gilles Wheeler	September 20, 1996	408
Katherine competes in a surfing competition, but faces danger when a rebuilt Leaky Faucet monster puts toxic Cog oil in all the water in Angel Grove.
30	"Rock-a-Bye Power Rangers"	Vickie Bronaugh	Tony Oliver & Barbara A. Oliver	September 23, 1996	409
After two weeks of constant Cog attacks by the Machine Empire, the Zeo Rangers are running ragged, exhausted by both their superhero duties and those of their normal life. Having gotten them to a weakened, sleep-deprived state, King Mondo sends down Somnibot, whose lullaby spell-singing manages to exploit this Achilles heel. Can the Gold Ranger wake them in time? Meanwhile, Bulk & Skull are entrusted with guarding a safe containing a valuable item for one whole day unaware that a cat burglar has his eye on it.
31	"Do I Know You?"	Vickie Bronaugh	Al Winchell	September 27, 1996	410
The mystery of the Gold Ranger's true identity intensifies when Borax, a member of the bounty hunter race known as the Varox, arrives on Earth targeting the Rangers' new ally with savage intent. King Mondo sees great promise in an alliance with Borax and offers to help him defeat and ensnare the Gold Ranger. Meanwhile, Bulk and Skull are hired to find a woman's dog, who went missing following a recent landing of Pyramidas.
32	"Revelations of Gold"	Vickie Bronaugh	Shuki Levy & Shell Danielson	October 3, 1996	411
The Varox attack the Gold Ranger, and he must seek refuge on Earth, asking the Rangers for help. This fails and he ends up crashlanding on Aquitar where the Varox assume him to be terminated as the Gold Ranger is revealed to be Trey of Triforia. Meanwhile, Lord Zedd and Rita Repulsa secretly return to the Moon to reclaim their evil empire, while tracking down Goldar and Rito.
33	"A Golden Homecoming"	Vickie Bronaugh	Douglas Sloan	October 4, 1996	412
The Machine Empire tries to stop Tommy from bringing a new recipient for the Golden powers to the Power Chamber. This recipient turns out to be Jason, the former Mighty Morphin Red Ranger. The Rangers must use the Super Zeozords to battle a rebuilt Silo, Mechanizer, Drill Master, and Hosehead who are now equipped with Neo-Plutonium Armor. Meanwhile in Rito and Goldar's dreams, Zedd and Rita are berating them and tell them that they have big plans that require their help. After remembering who they are, Rito and Goldar leave Bulk and Skull.
34	"Mondo's Last Stand"	Robert Radler	Mark Litton	October 9, 1996	413
As the Zeo Rangers quickly warm up to their new teammate, Rocky finds himself feeling left out and rejected. When King Mondo comes to Earth to retrieve a massively powerful sword, so he can destroy our heroes; personally, Rocky faces the giant Machine Empire ruler alone in an attempt to prove himself. He learns a hard lesson in teamwork and pays the price for his jealousy towards Jason as the Rangers wage a deciding battle against the Machine Empire King. Meanwhile, Bulk and Skull are hired to track down the original Burble Baby Food baby, leading them to suspect Jason. However, Ernie foils them by revealing that he's the original Burble Baby Food Baby, and he is awarded a lifetime supply of baby food. Also, Goldar and Rito are reunited with Rita & Zedd on the Moon.
35	"Bomber in the Summer"	Robert Radler	Stewart St. John	October 11, 1996	414
Ernie's plans to open a new Beach Club are spoiled by a group of tough motorcycle teens, while Rita and Lord Zedd conspire to overthrow the Machine Empire. Goldar and Rito launch Louie Kaboom from Earth, but accidentally loses the remote and earns their fury. One of the bikers named Emily befriends Jason and her elephant-headed necklace gets transformed into Tough Tusk by Louie Kaboom.
36	"Scent of a Weasel"	Douglas Sloan	Brett D. Born	October 23, 1996	415
The gang participates in a charity fashion show, where Skull plays bodyguard to a supermodel. Not to be upstaged by Louie Kaboom, Queen Machina sends Stenchy to raise a big stink. Zedd and Rita attempt to try and regain control of Louie Kaboom.
37	"The Lore of Auric"	Douglas Sloan	Jackie Marchand	October 25, 1996	417
Aisha sends Tanya a package that includes a key and a map of the island on which Tanya's parents disappeared. Desperate to find them, she entrusts the key to Jason while she goes to the island. Louie Kaboom takes an interest in the key upon discovering that, when inserted into a mystical tiki, it will summon Auric, a peaceful conqueror. When Auric refuses to do Louie's bidding, he tosses the key away. Prince Sprocket eagerly snatches the key, and tricks Auric into thinking that the Rangers are evil so that he will fight them. To the Rangers' dismay, Auric won't listen to them when they try to reason with him until Tommy explains their affiliation with Zordon. Meanwhile, Zedd and Rita use a super magnet in an attempt to return Louie Kaboom to their control. However, they're humiliated by Rito's efforts due to him incorrectly logging in the coordinates and leading to Zedd yelling at him for getting Detective Stone's car.
38	"The Ranger Who Came in from the Gold"	Douglas Sloan	Mark Hoffmeier	October 31, 1996	418
Katherine and Tanya are working on a ballet based on Midas; Jason and Adam are dancing in it against their will. Bulk and Skull need a job, so they bet the girls that they can get all the necessary props for the play. They go to find an assortment of gold props and get more than they can handle when Skull finds a golden dog statue that turns things to gold. When the Rangers realize it's a trap, they go to battle, and Jason gets turned to gold. Meanwhile, Louie Kaboom has wrestled control of the Machine Empire. He imprisons and exiles Queen Machina and Prince Sprocket. Zedd and Rita's attempt to take back their evil empire runs into a temporary snag when they must deal with an unexpected flat tire on their mobile base.
39	"The Joke's on Blue"	Isaac Florentine	Jim Suave & Colleen White	November 5, 1996	419
There's a new student at Angel Grove High as well as two detectives that intend to replace Bulk and Skull. Practical jokes run rampant, and it seems that no one is safe, so Bulk & Skull and their competition are hired to find the culprits. Meanwhile on the Moon, Zedd and Rita exiles Rito and Goldar out of their mobile base for their failures to recapture Louie Kaboom until they find something that could help them. Prince Sprocket is less than thrilled when his older brother Prince Gasket and his wife Princess Archerina arrive. After Machina tells them of their plight, Gasket and Archerina hatch a plan to get rid of Louie Kaboom by making him fall in love with Archerina and make him do her bidding. Goldar and Rito witness the exchange and attempt to tell Zedd and Rita, only to learn they have already known about it.
40	"Where In The World is Zeo Ranger 5?"	Isaac Florentine	Stewart St. John	November 6, 1996	420
The teens are stunned when Tommy mysteriously disappears. When their search for the missing Ranger proves fruitless, they must battle the noxious Cruel Chrome without him. Meanwhile, Gasket plans to use Tommy against the other rangers. On the Moon, Goldar and Rito must fix the engine of the mobile base, but Rito unwittingly sends it for a ride with Zedd and Rita inside. Also, Bulk and Skull are tasked with washing Stone's wavejumper.
41	"King for a Day"	Isaac Florentine & Koichi Sakamoto	Al Winchell	November 7, 1996	421
42	"King for a Day"	Isaac Florentine & Koichi Sakamoto	Al Winchell	November 8, 1996	422
The Rangers are alarmed when Bulk and Skull recount their run-in with Zeo Ranger 5, especially since they have yet to find him. Tommy has been brainwashed into thinking he's the King of the Machine Empire and that the Rangers are evil. Jason and Katherine go to where Bulk and Skull claim to have seen him; Jason gets sucked into another dimension where he must face Altor and later Tommy, who is more than willing to destroy him. While watching the fight on the TV, a horrified Goldar and Rito inform Zedd and Rita of their findings. Two of the Rangers would then disappear, and no one at the Command Center had an idea on how to find them. They can only watch in horror as Tommy tries to destroy his best friend. Bulk and Skull get sucked into the dimension too and make an ally of a fellow prisoner named Tritor who has a plan to help them escape. While amused at first by the fight, Rita and Zedd realize the horrifying truth that if something isn't done, the Machine Empire will be victorious. They also recognize if the Machine Empire succeeds and finds out they're back on the Moon, they could force Zedd and Rita back into exile again. Despite their desire to destroy the Rangers, they aid the Rangers in getting what they need.
43	"A Brief Mystery of Time"	Robert Radler	Buzz Alden & Charlotte Fullerton	November 11, 1996	423
Tommy keeps reliving the same day over and over again, but no one else notices anything weird, making him feel like he's going crazy. Upon visiting the Power Chamber, they discover something very distressing. They immediately go to fix the problem and find Protectron determined to stop them. Things quickly worsen when the Cogs, Prince Gasket, and Archerina enter the fray. Will the Rangers be able to prevent this catastrophe?
44	"A Mystery to Me"	Robert Radler	Jackie Marchand	November 14, 1996	424
The Rangers are invited to a "Whodunit Charity Party" in which they role-play to discover where Detective Stone went. Archerina uses the opportunity to trap all the Rangers except Katherine, making it seem like they are disappearing for real. Archerina's jealousy of Katherine overcomes her to the point that she wants to destroy her personally. Katherine must face her enemies all alone when neither she nor Zordon can contact the other Rangers. She does get help against Nuklifier from Auric the Conqueror.
45	"Another Song and Dance"	Robert Radler	Brett D. Born	November 15, 1996	426
Tommy has to perform a musical number for class, but he's afraid he's a little off-key. With Tanya's help and plenty of practice, Tommy hits all the right notes. But after Machina's spell, things aren't going so well for our budding Enrico Caruso. It's a terrible thing--they can't talk; they must sing, even when they don't want to even when the Rangers face off against Mechaterpillar.
46	"Rangers of Two Worlds"	Larry Litton	Mark Litton	November 20, 1996	427
47	"Rangers of Two Worlds"	Larry Litton	Mark Litton	November 21, 1996	428
Billy's regenerator (Note: This was the machine Billy used in Mighty Morphin Alien Rangers to restore himself after being turned young by Master Vile.) has a disturbing side effect that turns him into an old man. Meanwhile, Rita tries to change Katherine into a monster, but gets her purse instead. Impursanator proves to be the strongest monster the Rangers face until King Mondo, fully rebuilt, sends her away, enraging Rita. As a result of sabotage from Mondo's greatest monster Cog Changer, Billy becomes trapped in the Zeo Megazord while still aging as Mondo and Rita's monsters take control. To even up the score, the Alien Rangers travel to Earth and help defeat the monsters. Meanwhile, Bulk and Skull take the test for their detectives licenses. During the monster attack, they believe it to be part of the test to see if they can concentrate under fire, even as the office falls apart around them.
48	"Hawaii Zeo"	Vickie Bronaugh	Al Winchell	November 22, 1996	429
Tommy asks Katherine out on a date when Ernie puts on a luau at the Beach Club. Gasket and Archerina send Cogs to spoil the party. Meanwhile, Jason's Gold Ranger powers start to weaken. After failing to defeat the Rangers, King Mondo returns and forces Gasket and Archerina to flee.
49	"Good as Gold"	Vickie Bronaugh	Douglas Sloan	November 23, 1996	430
Jason, after fighting King Mondo's allies, finds out to his horror, that he's losing his powers as well as his strength. Pursued by Rita, Lord Zedd, and the Machine Empire, who are all greedy for his powers, he finds himself helpless. But when Zedd and Rita get into a fight with Mondo, he makes a narrow escape, and teleports to Angel Grove and collapses at the juice bar. The Rangers take Jason to the command center, and Zordon tells them that Jason will lose his Powers and life if the Gold Ranger's Powers are not transferred back to Trey, which can only happen when the Earth, Aquitar, and Triforia are aligned. Alpha 5 gives the Rangers a map with which they find the place for the power transfer. King Mondo furiously orders Cogs to prevent it. The Rangers fight them, and ship into action as Rocky comes just in time as the Gold Ranger's powers transfer back to Trey, who helps the Rangers beat the Cogs, but when King Mondo arrives super-sized with allies, the Rangers grow giant size by Trey's magical powers. Meanwhile, Zedd and Rita decide to try to trick King Mondo and set him up. They go to the scene, watch the fray from a safe distance, and have plans for both enemies no matter who wins. In the end, the Rangers win, but King Mondo's allies and he are not destroyed. Instead, they retreat to Zedd and Rita's delight. On the Moon, King Mondo quickly confronts them for not assisting him against the Rangers. Zedd and Rita pretend they have given up and offer a gift to the Machine Empire as a peace offering. They quickly leave in their base, which Prince Sprocket opens the present, and there's an explosion. While driving away laughing, Zedd proudly proclaims, they're back and King Mondo swears revenge against him and Rita. In the end, Jason takes his leave alongside his new girlfriend, Emily, as Tommy heads out with Katherine by his side.
50	"A Season to Remember"	Robert Radler	Jackie Marchand	November 27, 1996	425
An elderly Tommy recounts to his grandchild about the time that a spell cast on the teens by King Mondo causes them to be intolerable toward other cultures during the holiday season.

== Home media releases ==
Starting in August 1996, several episodes of Power Rangers Zeo were released on VHS.

Release name	Release date	Publisher	Stock Number	Notes	REF
Zeo Quest (contains: "Attack of the 60' Bulk", "Water You Thinking?", "Along Came a Spider", "Sowing the Seas of Evil", "Hogday Afternoon" (Parts 1 and 2), and "A Zeo Beginning" Parts 1 and 2)	August 6, 1996	Saban Home Entertainment/WarnerVision Family Entertainment	42060-3	Contains The Following Previews at the Beginning: Power Rangers Zeo: It Came From Angel Grove (1996); Power Rangers Zeo: 'Tis the Season to be Zeo (1996), Masked Rider: Ferbus' First Christmas (1995); Masked Rider (Featuring Ones For:Escape from Edenoi: Special 2 Part Mini-Series (1995), Super Gold: Special 2 Part Mini-Series (1995), Book and Tape Cassette and Collectible Action Figures (1995), Mighty Morphin Power Rangers: A Friend in Need" Parts 1, 2, & 3 (1995)); Power Rangers Zeo: Zeo Quest (1996) And A Promo For: Power Rangers Zeo: Deluxe Super Zeo Megazord Action Figures Advertisement	
"It Came from Angel Grove"	August 20, 1996	Saban Home Entertainment/WarnerVision Family Entertainment	42061-3	Contains The Following Previews at the Beginning: Power Rangers Zeo: Zeo Quest (1996); Power Rangers Zeo: 'Tis the Season to be Zeo (1996), Masked Rider: Ferbus' First Christmas (1995); Masked Rider (Featuring Ones For:Escape from Edenoi: Special 2 Part Mini-Series (1995), Super Gold: Special 2 Part Mini-Series (1995), Book and Tape Cassette and Collectible Action Figures (1995), Mighty Morphin Power Rangers: A Friend in Need" Parts 1, 2, & 3 (1995)); Sweet Valley High (Featuring Ones For:Kidnapped, Dangerous) (1994); Mighty Morphin Power Rangers: Lord Zedd's Monster Heads (1995) At The End of the Series: Bonus! Includes never-before-seen music video! Fright Night	

In 2012, Shout! Factory announced that it had reached an exclusive distribution deal with Saban Brands for shows such as Power Rangers and Big Bad Beetleborgs. Power Rangers Zeo was released on DVD in August 2012, as part of a Time-Life exclusive boxed set containing seasons 1–7. The show later became available independently of the boxed set in two volumes, each containing 25 episodes, released November 12, 2013, and February 11, 2014.

== Comics ==
Image Comics began publication of a Power Rangers Zeo comic in August 1996. It featured scripts by Tom and Mary Bierbaum, and art by Todd Nauck and Norm Rapmund. Four issues were drawn but only one was released before Image Comics lost the license.

Characters have been featured in Power Rangers comics published by Boom! Studios.

In 2018, the Zeo Rangers appeared in "Shattered Grid", a crossover event between teams from all eras commemorating the 25th anniversary of the original television series. It was published in Mighty Morphin Power Rangers #25–30 and various tie-ins. A Power Rangers Zeo story by Kyle Higgins and Marcus To was published in Mighty Morphin Power Rangers 2018 Annual as part of the crossover.

"Beyond the Grid", the follow-up to "Shattered Grid", was published in Mighty Morphin Power Rangers #31–39. It saw Tanya joining a new team alongside the Ranger Slayer, the Magna Defender, Cameron, Andros and the Dark Ranger.

== See also ==
- Chouriki Sentai Ohranger
