= Vamp (film) =

1986 film by Richard Wenk

- Theatrical release poster
- Directed by: Richard Wenk
- Screenplay by: Richard Wenk
- Story by: Donald P. Borchers; Richard Wenk
- Produced by: Donald P. Borchers
- Starring: Chris Makepeace; Sandy Baron; Robert Rusler; Dedee Pfeiffer; Gedde Watanabe; Grace Jones
- Cinematography: Elliot Davis
- Edited by: Mark Grossman
- Music by: Jonathan Elias
- Production companies: Balcor Film Investors; Planet Productions
- Distributed by: New World Pictures
- Release date: July 18, 1986
- Running time: 94 minutes
- Country: United States
- Language: English
- Budget: $3.3 million
- Box office: $4.9 million (US and Canada)

Vamp is a 1986 American comedy horror film written and directed by Richard Wenk, based on a story by Wenk and producer Donald P. Borchers. It stars Chris Makepeace, Sandy Baron, Robert Rusler, Dedee Pfeiffer, Gedde Watanabe, and Grace Jones.

In the film, three college students visit a strip club with the intention of hiring a stripper for a college fraternity. The stripper who impresses them turns out to be a powerful vampire, as do many of the other inhabitants of the part of town they find themselves in, and their carefree visit to the club turns into a struggle for survival.

Vamp was released in theaters on July 18, 1986, by New World Pictures. It grossed $4.9 million against a budget of $3.3 million and received mixed reviews from critics.

== Plot ==
College students Keith and AJ want to hire a stripper to bribe their way into a campus fraternity so they can move out of their cramped, noisy dorm room and into the frat's house. They borrow a Cadillac from lonely rich student Duncan, who insists on coming with them to scope out strip clubs in a nearby city. The three boys find themselves at a club in a shady part of town, and after being impressed by the surreal and artistic performance of one stripper, Katrina, AJ visits her dressing room to try to convince her to come strip for their college party. Katrina pins him to her waterbed filled with blood and seduces him by massaging, licking, and gently biting his chest. As she transforms into a vampire, she breaks one of AJ's arms to keep him from fighting her off, and kills him with a deep bite to the neck.

Concerned about AJ not returning to the bar area, Keith gets help from a waitress named Amaretto, who keeps insisting that she knows him, to his confusion. They search the neighborhood, and Keith is separated from her while trying to escape from both a psychotic albino street gang and local vampires. While hiding in a dumpster, he finds AJ's discarded corpse, but when he calls the police and returns to the club to accuse the owners, the vampires have preempted him by bringing the undead AJ back. AJ confesses to Keith that he is now a vampire, and after realizing that Keith will not kill him and is willing to die for him, AJ drives a piece of broken furniture through his own heart.

Keith, Amaretto, and Duncan flee the club, but their car is rammed by vehicles driven by vampires. After escaping, Keith and Amaretto realize that Duncan has also become a vampire, and they abandon him in the burning car, which then explodes. While attempting to escape through the sewers, Amaretto tells Keith her real name is Allison Hicks, and she knows him from a game of spin the bottle in fifth grade. While they flee through the sewers, they discover and burn a nest of vampires, but Allison is grabbed and held hostage by Katrina. After an arrow to the face and a pipe impaling her through the chest fail to stop Katrina, Keith kills her by shooting arrows through a covered grating, allowing in sunlight which destroys her. Before they can escape to the surface, they are trapped by Vlad, Katrina's vampire consort, until Vlad is staked from behind by a revived AJ, who sheepishly notes that the stake he tried to kill himself with turned out to be formica.

As Keith and Allison climb to the surface daylight, AJ remains in the sewers, making plans for how he can remain roommates with Keith by attending night school, or working a job on a graveyard shift.

== Cast ==
- Chris Makepeace as Keith
- Sandy Baron as Victor "Vic"
- Robert Rusler as A.J.
- Dedee Pfeiffer as Allison Hicks / Amaretto
- Gedde Watanabe as Duncan
- Grace Jones as Katrina
- Billy Drago as "Snow"
- Lisa Lyon as "Cimmaron"

== Production ==
Richard Wenk had written a short film called Dracula Bites the Big Apple which impressed Donald Borchers and they decided to develop a film together. This became It Came.... All Night, a spoof of thrillers in the style of Airplane! However they could not sell it. Instead they wrote a vampire film which Borchers set up at New World Pictures.

Producer Donald Borchers said they wrote the role of Vic for Jerry Lewis, who wanted to be in the film, but the sales department was not enthusiastic about this casting. The filmmakers decided to cast a name actor in the part of the vampire and went after Grace Jones who had been in Conan the Destroyer and View to a Kill. Borchers said they got Jones for a relatively low fee because she owed money to the IRS.

Filming took place in January 1986. The director had trouble with Jones' acting on set so he removed most of her dialogue.

== Reception ==
Reviews were mixed to negative. Roger Ebert of the Chicago Sun-Times gave the film two stars out of four, writing that there were "some funny lines, and the relationship between the human kid and his best pal the vampire is handled with a lot of original twists. But the movie finally descends, as so many films do these days, to one of those assembly-line endings made up of fights and chases." D. J. R. Bruckner of The New York Times called the writing and direction "weak" and the story "so confused, that 'Vamp' often seems as silly as the films it tries to ridicule." A positive review in Variety praised the film as "extremely imaginative" with a "very good" cast, and referred to Grace Jones' dance number as "an outré showstopper."

Patrick Goldstein of the Los Angeles Times wrote, "Despite a few delightfully grim comic touches, 'Vamp' never really captures the spirit of light-headed horror needed to propel this kind of macabre mayhem. Writer-director Richard Wenk has a real flair for offbeat humor ... but we find ourselves much more enchanted by the film's kooky peripheral characters than by its plodding storyline." Paul Attanasio of The Washington Post panned the film as "stupid and crude." Sid Smith of the Chicago Tribune gave the film 1.5 stars out of 4, writing that "the laughs are strained, and many of the effects are ludicrous. The filmmakers couldn't come up with enough good plot and dialogue to fill in the gaps between their little satirical stabs." A review by Mark Finch in The Monthly Film Bulletin was generally positive, finding that although the concept of a club where the strippers possess authority could have been explored more, "the film remains confident and agreeably scary without becoming lost in a swamp of movie-buff jokes or out-and-out campiness."

On the review aggregator website Rotten Tomatoes, the film holds an approval rating of 36% based on 11 reviews.

== Influences ==
Many viewers argue that Vamp heavily influenced Robert Rodriguez's From Dusk till Dawn (1996), from the setting of a strip club to the sexy dance performance put on by the lead female character in each respective film. Vamp tells the story of two fraternity pledges looking to find a stripper at the "After Dark" club, which is home to a group of stripper vampires, whereas From Dusk till Dawn tells the story of two fugitive bank-robbing brothers who are fleeing the FBI as well as the Texas police and end up at the "Titty Twister", a strip club in the middle of a desolate part of Mexico which, in comparison to Vamp, is home to a group of Aztec stripper vampires.

== Release ==
Vamp was released theatrically in the United States on July 18, 1986, and grossed $4,941,117 at the box office.

Arrow Video released Vamp on Blu-ray and DVD in the US on October 4, 2016, and the UK Blu-ray/DVD release on October 3, 2016. This version of the film features a high-definition digital transfer along with special features.

== See also ==
- List of American films of 1986
- Vampire films
