= Amanda Peterson =

American actress (1971–2015)

- Born: Phyllis Amanda Peterson; July 8, 1971; Greeley, Colorado, U.S.
- Died: July 3, 2015 (aged 43); Greeley, Colorado, U.S.
- Other name: Mandy Peterson
- Education: Middlebury College; University of Northern Colorado; Colorado State University
- Occupation: Actress
- Years active: 1979–1994
- Known for: Can't Buy Me Love
- Spouses: Joseph Robert Skutvik; David Hartley
- Children: 2

Phyllis Amanda Peterson (July 8, 1971 – July 3, 2015) was an American actress best known for her roles as Cindy Mancini in the 1987 film Can't Buy Me Love and Sunny Sisk on the NBC drama series A Year in the Life (1987–1988).

Peterson died at age 43 from an accidental drug overdose when she mixed a prescription drug with illegally obtained morphine following surgery.

== Early life ==
Peterson was born in Greeley, Colorado, the youngest of three children born to James Peterson—an ear, nose, and throat specialist—and his wife, Sylvia. She had two older siblings: a sister, Anne Marie, and a brother, James Jr. She was credited as Mandy Peterson at the beginning of her career; "Mandy" was how she was known to her friends and relatives. She later assumed "Amanda Peterson" as her professional name.

== Career ==
At age seven, Peterson made her stage debut as Gretl von Trapp in a University of Northern Colorado production of The Sound of Music. At 11, she won a role in the musical film Annie as a dancing extra. Peterson went on to land guest spots on Father Murphy and Silver Spoons, while also appearing in more than 50 television commercials. Between 1983 and 1984, she co-starred as Squirt Sawyer on the NBC drama series Boone, which was canceled after one season.

In 1985, Peterson won her first major film role, playing Lori Swenson in the sci-fi fantasy Explorers. Despite performing modestly at the box office, the Joe Dante-directed feature went on to secure a cult following. Next, she co-starred as Sunny Sisk, the granddaughter of a successful businessman, in the Emmy Award-winning miniseries A Year in the Life; the third highest-rated miniseries of the 1986–87 U.S. television season. It was later adapted into a full series, airing on NBC from 1987 to 1988. For her work as Sisk on the show, Peterson won a Young Artist Award. Though initially well received, Life was canceled after one season.

In 1986, 15-year-old Peterson was cast to play the headline role of Cindy Mancini in the Buena Vista romantic comedy, Boy Rents Girl. The title was later changed to Can't Buy Me Love after producers secured the rights to The Beatles' 1964 song of the same title, which was featured on the soundtrack. Released in August 1987, Love received mixed reviews but became the sleeper hit of the summer, with Peterson going on to achieve teen idol status as a result. In their critique of the film, The New York Times found Peterson's portrayal of Mancini to be "appealing", while highlighting her chemistry with co-star Patrick Dempsey.

In 1988, Peterson starred in a Roger Corman production, the post-apocalyptic adventure film The Lawless Land. This was followed by a co-starring role in the 1989 ensemble drama Listen to Me. She returned to her hometown of Greeley that same year to graduate from University High School, having been privately tutored while working in Los Angeles. Shortly afterward, she starred in the straight-to-video thriller Fatal Charm (1990), playing a naïve high schooler who forms a dangerous bond with a serial killer. That fall, Peterson enrolled at Middlebury College, where she appeared in a black box production of the Sarah Daniels play, Masterpieces, as well as guesting on Doogie Howser, M.D. while on semester break.

Following a recurring spot on the ABC drama series Jack's Place in 1993, Peterson's final appearance on-screen was a supporting role in the 1994 fantasy film, WindRunner, filmed when she was 22 years old.

== Later years ==
In 1994, Peterson retired from the entertainment industry and returned to her hometown of Greeley. According to her father, she left Hollywood to "choose a new path in her life." After briefly attending Middlebury College, she enrolled at Colorado State University for a year. Peterson later studied at the University of Northern Colorado. In May 2012, she appeared in her last-ever photoshoot.

Peterson was twice married and had two children. She was first married to Joseph Robert Skutvik. After their divorce, she married David Hartley. Peterson and Hartley were reportedly divorced at the time of her death.

Between October 2000 and May 2012, Peterson was arrested five times for the offenses of third-degree assault, harassment, DUI, and possession of drug paraphernalia and suspicion of distributing a Schedule 2 controlled substance. From September to December 2005, she spent nearly three months in jail. Peterson's last arrests were for a misdemeanor DUI and possession of narcotics equipment in April 2012, and suspicion of child abuse in May 2012, which was later dropped.

According to her father, she had previously struggled with drug issues, but was drug-free at the time of her death and had become "quite religious." He added that, in recent years, Peterson had suffered from sleep apnea, as well as bouts of pneumonia and sinusitis. For the last three years of her life, Peterson was receiving disability benefits and lived alone in an apartment in Greeley.

== Death ==
Peterson was reported missing on July 3, 2015, after her family grew concerned when she failed to attend a planned dinner. Two days later, on July 5, she was found dead at her home by Greeley police, three days short of her 44th birthday. Though her apartment door was unlocked, authorities found no evidence of foul play.

In an interview with Entertainment Tonight following Peterson's death, her mother stated that while her daughter had dealt with drug issues in the past, she believed her to be drug-free at the time of her death, emphasizing that it "was not in any way a drug thing."

An autopsy was scheduled for July 6 by the Weld County coroner, with results released on September 2, 2015. The examination revealed Peterson's death resulted from an accidental drug overdose. She had recently undergone a hysterectomy and was prescribed Gabapentin for pain management. Additionally, she had been taking morphine obtained from a friend a week prior. The coroner attributed her death to respiratory failure triggered by a "morphine effect."

Two months after her death, in a September 2015 interview with talk show The Doctors, Peterson's family revealed that she had been raped at age 15 and had not disclosed it at the time, even to her sister. This incident changed her attitude and led to trust issues. Some family members stated that the incident led to her drug use.

== Filmography ==
=== Film ===
Year	Title	Role	Notes
1982	Annie	Dancer	Credited as Mandy Peterson
1985	Explorers	Lori Swenson	
1987	Can't Buy Me Love	Cindy Mancini	
1988	The Lawless Land	Diana	
1989	Listen to Me	Donna Lumis	
1990	Fatal Charm	Valerie	
1994	WindRunner	Julie Moore	a.k.a. WindRunner: A Spirited Journey

=== Television ===
Year	Title	Role	Notes
1982	Father Murphy	Elizabeth	Episode: "Matthew and Elizabeth"
1982	Silver Spoons	Sally Frumbel	Episode: "Takin' a Chance on Love"
1983–1984	Boone	Squirt Sawyer	Main cast
1984	Best Kept Secrets	Gretchen	Television film
1985	And the Children Shall Lead	Jenny	Television film
1986	A Year in the Life	Sunny Sisk	Miniseries, main cast
1986	Carly Mills	Trisha Mills	Television film
1987–1988	A Year in the Life	Sunny Sisk	Main cast
1989	Love and Betrayal	Stephanie	Television film a.k.a. Throw Away Wives
1990	Doogie Howser, M.D.	Bernadette Callen	Episode: "Vinnie's Blind Date"
1991	Hell Hath No Fury	Michelle Ferguson	Television film
1991	Posing: Inspired by Three Real Stories	Abigail Baywood	Television film a.k.a. I Posed for Playboy
1993	Jack's Place	Elodie Rayburn	4 episodes

== Awards and nominations ==
Awards
Year	Award	Category	Title of work	Result
1984	Young Artist Award	Best Young Actress in a New Television Series	Boone	Nominated
1985	Young Artist Award	Best Young Supporting Actress in a Daytime or Nighttime Drama	Boone	Nominated
1986	Young Artist Award	Best Starring Performance by a Young Actress – Motion Picture	Explorers	Nominated
1987	Young Artist Award	Best Young Actress Starring in a Television Drama Series	A Year in the Life	Won
1988	Young Artist Award	Best Young Actress in a Motion Picture – Comedy	Can't Buy Me Love	Nominated

== See also ==
- List of solved missing person cases (2010s)
