= Surveillance (2006 film) =

- Directed by: Fritz Kiersch
- Written by: David Golden
- Produced by: Amy Briede; Gray Frederickson; Lance McDaniel; John Simonelli
- Starring: Armand Assante
- Cinematography: Charles Schner
- Edited by: Lewis Schoenbrun
- Music by: Sean Morris
- Production company: Graymark Productions
- Distributed by: Image Entertainment
- Release dates: June 9, 2006 (Dead Center Film Festival); October 24, 2006 (US)
- Running time: 90 minutes
- Country: United States
- Language: English

Surveillance is a 2006 crime thriller film directed by Fritz Kiersch and starring Armand Assante and Nick Cornish.

== Cast ==
- Armand Assante as Harley
- Nick Cornish as Dennis
- Laurie Fortier as Claire
- Robert Rusler as Ben Palmer
- Nando Betancur as Stock Boy

== Production ==
Filming took place in Oklahoma City, Oklahoma.
