= Leon and the Peoples =

Reggae & Soul band

Leon & The Peoples is a Reggae & Soul band led by actor and singer/songwriter Leon Robinson.

== History ==
Robinson portrayed singer David Ruffin in the award winning “The Temptations Mini-Series” and in both “The Little Richard Story” and “The Five Heartbeats”. Leon made his singing debut playing a reggae singer in “The Price of Kissing” in which he sang a reggae rendition of “Daddy’s Home”. In 2008, Leon & The Peoples song, "Life Is A Funny Game" was featured as the closing credit song on the 20th Century Fox movie "Cover" directed by Bill Duke.

The band has appeared on BET’s “106 and Park” and have headlined the concert in Central Park celebrating the NYC AIDS WALK (2003–2009).They performed at NYC Summer Stage and The International Music and Arts Festival in New Orleans, LA. and other Reggae festivals in the United States. In 2007 they appeared alongside reggae artists Beres Hammond and Marcia Griffiths for the "For The Love of It Tour", playing many sold out dates including House of Blues in LA, San Diego and Atlantic City, the Roxy in Boston, BB Kings in NYC and Hard Rock Live in Orlando.

Robinson travels back and forth to Jamaica as an actor, and has portrayed Jamaicans in some of his movie roles such as Derice Bannock in Cool Runnings. He has worked with the charity Upliftment Jamaica, which is a social service organization aimed at providing recreation, education, and health services for St. Thomas.

== Discography ==
The Road Less Traveled is The Peoples' debut album. The album was produced at Pulse Studios in New York City. Syleena Johnson is featured on the cover of the track “Bottles and Cans” which was originally sung by Angie Stone. Beres Hammond produced the track “New Day.” Tony Rebel produced the track “Working Man” and Tanto Metro of the duo known as (Tanto Metro and Devonte) produced the R&B cover "Second That Emotion" originally performed by Smokey Robinson and The Miracles. The album has 13 tracks which include the track "Will You Be My Wife" and another cover of the song "Lovely Day."

In 2015, Leon and the Peoples released a single entitled 'Love is a Beautiful Thing' which charted on the Billboard charts multiple times peaking as high as number 3 through the Spectra Music Group.

Leon & The Peoples released their Spectra Music Group debut album "Love Is A Beautiful Thing" on Friday July 20, 2019. "Love Is A Beautiful Thing" have achieved significant Billboard success, hitting the Hot Singles Charts numerous times, reaching as high as number three with the title track. Other singles on the album that hit the Billboard Hot Singles Charts include the Ernie Halter cover "I’ld Look Good On You" and "Beautiful". The album contains 11 tracks.

== Personnel ==
- Leon (Lead Vocals)
- Anthony T-Bone McEwan (Bass)
- Daryl Chalmers (Drums)
- Jacinta Perry (Key Board)
- Antonio ‘Alex’ Solynn (Guitar)
- Malesa Ible (Background Vocals)
- Cathy ‘Alexis’ Layne (Background Vocals)
- Monia Amore (Background Vocals)
- Bri Coleman (Publicity)
