= Fatal Charm (1990 film) =

- Directed by: Fritz Kiersch (as Alan Smithee)
- Written by: Nicholas Niciphor
- Produced by: Bruce Cohn Curtis
- Starring: Christopher Atkins; Amanda Peterson; James Remar; Peggy Lipton; Andrew Robinson; Lar Park-Lincoln; Robert Walker Jr. Shelley Smith; Andrew Lowery; Barbara McNair; Jane Kean; Ned Bellamy; Ken Foree; Kevin Brophy
- Cinematography: Steve Grass
- Edited by: Bob Ducsay; Bill Butler
- Music by: James Donnellan
- Release date: September 18, 1990
- Country: United States
- Language: English

Fatal Charm is a 1990 American direct-to-video thriller film directed by Fritz Kiersch under the pseudonym of Alan Smithee. The musical score was composed by James Donnellan. The film starring Christopher Atkins, Amanda Peterson, James Remar, Peggy Lipton, Andrew Robinson and Lar Park-Lincoln in the lead roles. In the United States, the film premiered February 22, 1992 on Showtime.

== Story ==
An innocent and naive teenage girl named Valerie decides to talk to a man named Adam who was convicted of rape and murder. She refuses to believe that he is a serial killer and rapist and tries to prove to others that he is not who everyone says he is.

== Cast ==
Actor	Role	Notes
Christopher Atkins	Adam Brenner	
Amanda Peterson	Valerie	
James Remar	Louis	
Peggy Lipton	Jane Sims	
Andrew Robinson	Sheriff Harry Childs	
Lar Park-Lincoln	Sandy	
Robert Walker Jr.	Edgar Perkins	
Shelley Smith	Kathy Crowley	
Andrew Lowery	James Childs	
Barbara McNair	English Teacher	
Jane Kean	Home-Ec Teacher	
Ned Bellamy	Adolph	
Ken Foree	Willy	
Kevin Brophy	Deputy Williams	
Dennis Cleveland Stewart	Moody	

== Release ==
Following the Bankruptcy of production company Management Company Entertainment Group (M.C.E.G.) the film premiered on Showtime. Showtime had a deal with M.C.E.G. to air their films following their theatrical runs. After M.C.E.G. reorganized following their bankruptcy, Fatal Charm along with other M.C.E.G. productions Boris and Natasha: The Movie and Chains of Gold aired directly on Showtime and skipping a theatrical release altogether.

Filming started on Fatal Charm in May 1989. Initially, Peter Medak was the film's director and was ultimately replaced by Fritz Kiersch.

The film aired on Showtime on February 22, 1992. Following its cable premiere, the film was released on home video on May 5, 1993.
