= Chris Makepeace =

Canadian actor (born 1964)

- Born: April 22, 1964 (age 62); Montreal, Quebec, Canada
- Years active: 1974–2001
- Known for: Meatballs; My Bodyguard; The Last Chase; Vamp
- Spouse: Elizabeth Makepeace (m. 2015)

Christopher Makepeace (born April 22, 1964) is a Canadian former actor, known for his starring roles in the coming-of-age film My Bodyguard (1980) and comedy horror Vamp (1986), and supporting roles in the screwball comedy Meatballs (1979) and the dystopian sci-fi film The Last Chase (1981), during his teen and young adult years.

== Life and career ==
Makepeace was born in Montreal, Quebec, the son of Doreen and Harry Makepeace. His older brother, Tony Makepeace, is a Canadian photographer.

He began his acting career in a 1974 Canadian television special, The Ottawa Valley. His next role was in a 1979 Canadian comedy, Meatballs, in which he starred opposite Bill Murray, portrayed as a shy, loner teen attendee of a summer camp, who has trouble fitting in. The movie was a hit, grossing more than $43 million at the box office, and Makepeace received good notices for his work in the film. He was then cast in the lead role in the Fox film, My Bodyguard, released in July 1980 to positive reviews, earning $22.5 million domestically. In his review of the film, critic Roger Ebert said that Makepeace's performance resulted in "one of the most engaging teenage characters I've seen in the movies in a long time." Makepeace also starred opposite Lee Majors and Burgess Meredith in the 1981 film The Last Chase. Makepeace's subsequent roles included appearances in made-for-television films and a few more feature films, including Mazes and Monsters with Tom Hanks, The Falcon and the Snowman in 1985 and 1986's Vamp.

In 1981, Makepeace recorded spoken dialogue for the Kiss album Music from "The Elder" with Producer Bob Ezrin, but it was not used in the final mix; plans to turn the album into a feature film never materialized.

He has not appeared in any films since 2001, moving instead behind the camera as an assistant director.

== Filmography ==
=== Film and television credits ===
Year	Title	Role	Notes
1974	The Ottawa Valley	Unknown	Uncredited
1979	Meatballs	Rudy Gerner	Film
1980	Other People's Children		TV Movie
1980	My Bodyguard	Clifford Peache	Film
1981	The Littlest Hobo	Willie	Episode: "East Side Angels"
1981	The Last Chase	Ring	Film
1982	Going Great	Series Host	(1982 TV series)
1982	The Mysterious Stranger	August Feldner	TV Movie
1982	Mazes and Monsters	Jay "Jay-Jay" Brockway	Made-for-television movie CBS
1983	The Terry Fox Story	Darrell Fox	TV movie
1983-1984	Going Great	Host	TV series
1984	The Oasis	Matt	Film
1985	The Falcon and the Snowman	David Lee	Film
1985	The Undergrads	Dennis "Jody" Adler	TV movie
1986	Vamp	Keith	Film
1987	Captive Hearts	Robert	Film
1988	Aloha Summer	Mike Tognetti	Film
1988	Why on Earth?	Franklin Smith	TV series Pilot
1989	The Jim Henson Hour	Zeb Norman	Episodes: "Science Fiction" and "Aquatic Life"
1989	The Hitchhiker	Jeremy	Episode: "Power Play"
1991	Beyond Reality	Anthony Bowen	Episode: "Miracle Worker"
1996	Memory Run	Andre Fuller	Film
1996	A Holiday for Love	Joe Marsdon	TV movie
1998	Short for Nothing	Glen	Film
2001	Full Disclosure	Pilot	Video

== Awards ==
Year	Award	Category/Recipient	Result	Refs
1980	Genie Award	Best Performance by an Actor in a Supporting Role for: Meatballs (1979)	Nominated	
