= Against the Odds (TV series) =

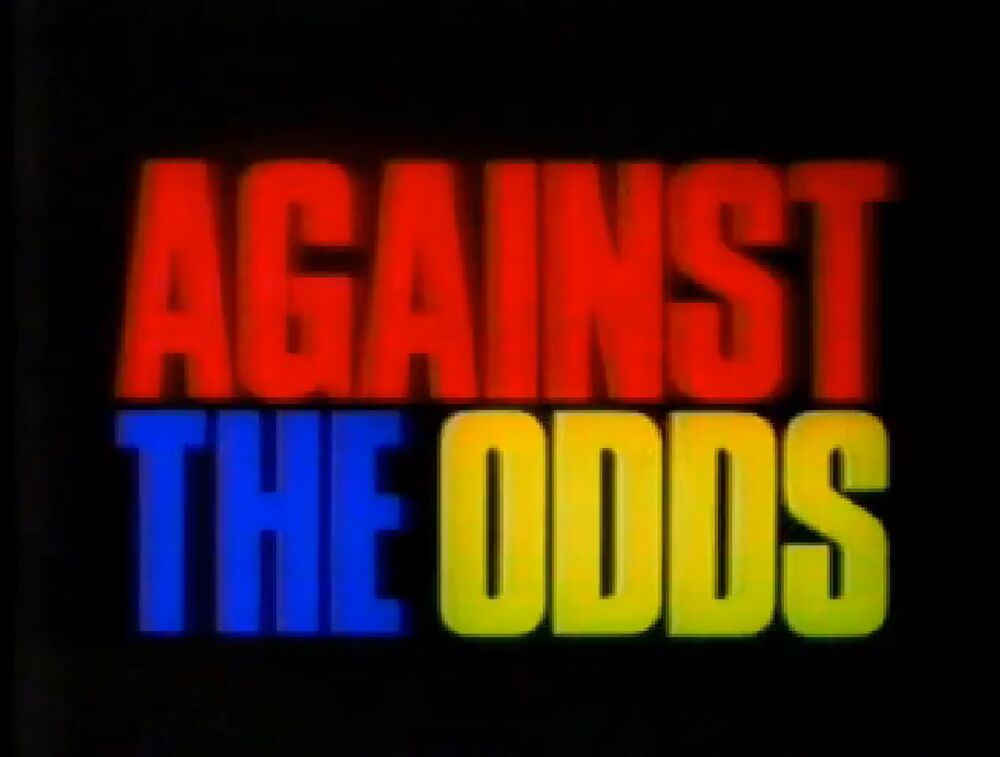
- Created by: Cy Schneider
- Starring: Bill Bixby; Virginia Capers; Peter Brooks
- Country of origin: United States
- Original language: English

Production
- Executive producers: Bob Klein; Bruce Littlejohn
- Producer: Marcus Keys

Original release
- Network: Nickelodeon
- Release: July 4, 1982 – 1984

Against the Odds is an American documentary television series targeted to children and adolescents, that was produced and originally broadcast by Nickelodeon from July 4, 1982 through 1984. The series, hosted by Bill Bixby and narrated by Philip Proctor, profiled inspirational stories of people throughout history.

Geraldine Laybourne, then-program manager and later president of Nickelodeon, noted that her young son described the show as "a series of little tragedies" that famous people overcame on their journey to what made them so well known.

The series is unrelated to the US military battlefield history series of the same name that was originally broadcast on the American Heroes Channel from 2014 through 2016.

== Profiles ==
Against the Odds profiled several notable historical figures including:

- Albert Einstein
- Paul Robeson
- Pablo Picasso
- Bessie Smith
- Louis Pasteur
- Margaret Mead
- Elizabeth Blackwell
- Dorothea Lange
- Malcolm X
- Napoleon Bonaparte
- Walt Whitman
- Joan of Arc
- George Washington Carver
- Martin Luther King Jr.
- Frank Lloyd Wright
- Pancho Villa
- Adolf Hitler
- Charles Darwin
- Al Capone
- Jackie Robinson
- Harry Houdini
- Golda Meir
- Helen Keller
- D.W. Griffith
- Samuel Adams
- Abraham Lincoln
- Charles Lindbergh
- Thomas Edison
- Henry Ford
- Vladimir Lenin
- Amelia Earhart
- Franklin Roosevelt
- Eleanor Roosevelt
- Andrew Carnegie
- Rudolph Valentino
- John Glenn
- Babe Didrickson
- Robert Oppenheimer
- Pelé
- Ludwig van Beethoven
- Mahatma Gandhi
- Mao Tse-tung
- Winston Churchill
- Clara Barton
- Woody Guthrie
- Elizabeth Cady Stanton
- Susan B. Anthony
- Sarah Bernhardt
- P. T. Barnum
