= Cy Schneider =

American advertising executive and author (1929–1994)

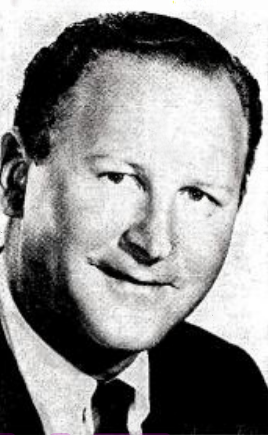
Cyril Schneider (1962 publicity photo)

Cyril M. Schneider (June 11, 1929 – February 22, 1994) was an American advertising executive and author. He is best known for his work in children's advertising for Mattel and as the president of Nickelodeon from 1980 to 1984. He is not related to Dan Schneider.

== Early life ==
Schneider was born on June 11, 1929, in Chicago, Illinois to Marcus and Marcia Schneider (née Cotler). His home town was Los Angeles. He graduated with a degree in journalism from the University of Southern California and graduated with a master's degree in American literature from New York University.

== Career ==
=== Carson-Roberts Agency ===
He joined the Carson-Roberts Agency in Los Angeles in 1953 and later on became the president of the company until 1970 when it was bought by Ogilvy & Mather, where Schneider would work for the next 10 years. In 1954, he was an Account Manager for Mattel in the Carson-Roberts Agency. In that same year Mattel spent $500,000 to sponsor the Mickey Mouse Club. Schneider was the first person to film a toy commercial. From 1978 to 1980, Schneider was Ogilvy & Mather's senior vice president in New York City.

=== Nickelodeon ===
In 1980, Warner-Amex Satellite Entertainment Network hired Schneider to be the president of the then-new Nickelodeon network. Despite introducing popular programs such as You Can't Do That on Television to the lineup in 1981, Nickelodeon operated at a loss of $10 million, and at one point had the lowest number of viewers compared to other cable channels by 1984. In 1983, Bob Pittman was made head of MTV Networks and Schneider was not comfortable with his "idiotic" approach to "home-based" television. As a result, Schneider left the network in early 1984.

=== Post Nickelodeon years ===
From 1984 to his death in 1994, Schneider worked at Bozell, an advertising agency in New York, and served as its corporate vice president from 1988 until 1994. In 1987, he wrote a book about children's advertising and programs called Children's Television: The Art, the Business and How it Works.

== Death ==
Schneider died from cancer on February 22, 1994 in New York.

Preceded by Vivian Horner	Nickelodeon president 1980–1984	Succeeded by Geraldine Laybourne
