= Noam Kaniel =

Israeli musician (born 1962)

Noam Kaniel נועם קניאל
- Also known as: Noam
- Born: 1962 (age 63–64); Tel Aviv, Israel
- Genre: Pop
- Occupations: Musician; singer; composer
- Years active: 1971–present

Noam Kaniel (Hebrew: נועם קניאל; born 1962), also known mononymously as Noam, is an Israeli musician, singer and composer, who has sold over 8 million records, and is known for composing or performing music for various television series, including X-Men, Goldorak, The Mysterious Cities of Gold, Heathcliff and the Catillac Cats, Code Lyoko, Miraculous Ladybug, Digimon Fusion, Glitter Force, Luna Petunia, and Power Rangers.

== Biography ==
Kaniel was born in 1962 in Tel Aviv, to musicians Eli and Aviva Kaniel. He began singing at the age of eight, taking second place in a children's singing contest organized by his future most frequent collaborator, producer Haim Saban, in partnership with Yuda Talit.

While in Israel, he went on to record such major hit songs as "Gali" and "Ima Sheli"; during this period, he performed continuously.

In 1973, during the Yom Kippur War, Mike Brant met Kaniel in France and helped him further his career.

Kaniel's first release, "Difficile de Choisir", went straight to the top of the charts. From 1972 to 1978, this was followed in succession by such hits as "Viens Maman on Va Danser", "Une Maman", "Lollipop" and other singles. Two subsequent albums followed.

In 1975, Kaniel released an album in Japan in which he sang all 12 tracks in Japanese. This resulted in his headlining a concert tour, first in Tokyo, then in Johannesburg, South Africa.

Three years later, Kaniel recorded France's first-ever major theme song for an animated cartoon show. The 1978 production Goldorak, a French-dubbed version of UFO Robot Grendizer, was the first anime series to be telecast in France. Kaniel's performance earned him unprecedented celebrity status in France.

At the end of 1978, Kaniel moved to Los Angeles, following Haim Saban and his partner Shuki Levy. The three recorded theme music or songs for the animated series Les Entrechats, Popples, The Fantastic Four, Superman, The Incredible Hulk, He-Man and the Masters of the Universe and its spin-off, She-Ra: Princess of Power. Levy and Saban brought Kaniel together with Filmation founder Lou Scheimer and his daughter Erika to record "I Have the Power," the theme song of the pilot The Secret of the Sword, which subsequently received U.S. theatrical distribution. He also co-performed with Ciro Dammicco for the theme song of the Italian dub of Urusei Yatsura in the 1980s.

In 1980, Kaniel made his acting debut in an Israeli film, Kohav Hashahar (Morning Star), in which he portrayed an aspiring teen singer who tries to help his fisherman father out of ruin.

In 1988, he recorded and released "My Butterfly", which he wrote with his friend Alain Garcia as a tribute to his wife Kira, who had died from cancer at the age of 23. Shortly after "My Butterfly" was released, Kaniel abandoned his acting career, making scant appearances on French and Israeli TV.

In 1993, Kaniel worked with Saban once as a music producer (alongside Ron Wasserman) on Mighty Morphin Power Rangers.

In 1995, Kaniel took a sabbatical to return to songwriting. To date, he has written or produced material for such French music stars as Mireille Mathieu, Patricia Kaas, Ophélie Winter, Hélène Ségara, Patrick Fiori, Lorie, Julie Zenatti and Lââm.

In 1998, Kaniel worked with Johnny Williams and Louis Element to create MIRANDA, a mix of technopop and dance fusion that took the European charts by storm. Miranda's first single, "Vamos A La Playa" was sold over 2,000,000 copies worldwide, and was honored as Best Italian Artist of the Year. In the next decade, Kaniel returned to writing music for animated television and theatrical films, such as Miraculous: Tales of Ladybug & Cat Noir.

In 2011, Kaniel worked with Saban once again on Power Rangers Samurai, providing the opening theme and arrangements. Kaniel continued to work with Saban on the Power Rangers franchise with Saban Brands. Kaniel produced music for Megaforce, Super Megaforce, Dino Charge, Dino Super Charge and Ninja Steel. When the franchise was purchased by Hasbro, it was announced that Kaniel would return to produce music for Power Rangers Beast Morphers.

In 2015, Kaniel worked with Saban and the band Blush on the soundtrack of Glitter Force.

=== Television ===
- Gadget & the Gadgetinis (2002, French intro only)
- Pig City (2002)
- L'Odyssee (2003)
- Code Lyoko (2003-2007, theme song)
- What's with Andy? (2003, season 2 only)
- Martin Mystery (2003, theme song)
- The Tofus (2004)
- W.I.T.C.H. (2004)
- A.T.O.M. (2005)
- Pet Alien (2004, French intro only)
- Fantastic Four: World's Greatest Heroes (2006)
- Pop Secret (2006)
- Casper's Scare School (2008–11)
- Combo Ninos (2008)
- Gormiti: The Lords of Nature Return! (2008)
- In ze boîte (2008–17)
- Monster Buster Club (2008–09, theme song)
- Power Rangers Samurai (2011–12)
- Team Galaxy (2008)
- Tara Duncan (2009)
- Rekkit Rabbit (2010)
- Power Rangers Samurai (2011)
- The Mysterious Cities of Gold (2012)
- Kobushi (2012–present)
- Power Rangers Super Samurai (2012)
- Digimon Fusion (2013–15)
- Power Rangers Megaforce (2013)
- Sabrina: Secrets of a Teenage Witch (2013–14)
- Power Rangers Super Megaforce (2014)
- Sammy & Co. (2014–present)
- Power Rangers Dino Charge (2015)
- Glitter Force (2015–16)
- Popples (2015–16)
- Miraculous: Tales of Ladybug & Cat Noir (2015–present)
- Power Rangers Dino Super Charge (2016)
- Luna Petunia (2016-2017)
- Power Rangers Ninja Steel (2017)
- Zak Storm (2017–present)
- Glitter Force: Doki Doki (2017)
- Power Rangers Hyperforce (2017-2018)
- Power Rangers Super Ninja Steel (2018)
- DENVER (2018) M6
- Power Rangers Beast Morphers (2019–20)
- Mystérieuse Cités d'Or 4 (2019–20) France TV
- Rainbow Butterfly Unicorn Kitty (2019)
- Power Players (2019-2020) Cartoon Network
- Ghostforce (2021-2022)

VARIÉTÉ/songs for other singers:

- Vamos A la playa - Loona
- This love’s forever - Howard Hewitt
- Celebrate - the Temptations
- Tu pourra dire - Tina Arena / Patricia Kaas
- Que l’amour nous garde - Laam
- Mes rêves disaient la vérité - Hélène Segara
- Fragile - Julie Zenatti
- Vous lui dirai - Mireille Mathieu
- Ouvre - Ophelie Winter
- Une vie ne suffit pas - Laam
- Jamais jamais - Laam
- C’était pas la peine - Mireille Mathieu

=== Film ===
- Round Trip to Heaven (1992)
- Under Investigation (1993)
- Til Death Do Us Part: Part 1 (1993)
- Shattered Image (1994)
- Touch of a Panda (2009)
- Alpha & Omega 7: The Big Fureeze (2016)

== Sources ==
- www.bide-musique.com
- www.quesontilsdevenus.net
- www.radiojunior.com
