= DokiDoki! PreCure =

Japanese anime television series

- Key visual of the series featuring the five main Cures. In clockwise order: Cure Ace, Cure Sword, Cure Rosetta, Cure Diamond, and Cure Heart in the center.

ドキドキ！プリキュア (Dokidoki! Purikyua)
- Genre: Magical girl
- Created by: Izumi Todo
- Anime television series
- Directed by: Go Koga
- Produced by: Hiroaki Shibata
- Written by: Ryōta Yamaguchi
- Music by: Hiroshi Takaki (JP); Noam Kaniel (Noam) (US)
- Studio: Toei Animation
- Licensed by: NA: Saban Brands (2017) Toei Animation/Allspark Animation & Hasbro Entertainment (2017/18 & 19–present; licensing) Netflix (streaming rights)
- Original network: ANN (ABC, TV Asahi)
- English network: NA: Netflix (expired)
- Original run: February 3, 2013 – January 26, 2014
- Episodes: 49 (Original) (Note: Original version); 30 (Glitter Force Doki Doki) (Note: Glitter Force Doki Doki version)
- Manga
- Written by: Izumi Todo
- Illustrated by: Futago Kamikita
- Published by: Kodansha
- Magazine: Nakayoshi
- Original run: March 2013 – February 2014
- Video game

DokiDoki! PreCure: Narikiri Life!
- Developer: Namco Bandai Games
- Publisher: Namco Bandai Games
- Genre: Minigame
- Platform: Nintendo 3DS
- Released: August 1, 2013
- Anime film

DokiDoki! Precure the Movie: Mana Kekkon!!? Mirai ni Tsunagu Kibō no Dress
- Directed by: Naoyuki Itō
- Written by: Ryōta Yamaguchi
- Studio: Toei Animation
- Released: October 26, 2013

DokiDoki! PreCure (Japanese: ドキドキ！プリキュア, Hepburn: Dokidoki! Purikyua; lit. "Heart-Pounding! PreCure") is a Japanese anime series produced by Toei Animation and the tenth installment in Izumi Todo's Pretty Cure metaseries, featuring the eighth generation of Cures. The series is produced by Hiroaki Shibata, who produced Digimon Data Squad, and written by Ryōta Yamaguchi, who wrote the scripts for Sailor Moon Sailor Stars, Cutie Honey Flash and The Vision of Escaflowne. Character designs were done by Akira Takahashi, who previously did character designs for Suite PreCure. The series aired on the ANN network from February 3, 2013, to January 26, 2014, replacing Smile PreCure! in its timeslot, and was succeeded by HappinessCharge Pretty Cure!. An animated film based off of the series was released on October 26, 2013.

Saban Brands produced an international English dub of the series, Glitter Force: Doki Doki, which abridged the original forty-nine episodes to thirty. Although the Glitter Force trademark was transferred to Toei during production in May 2017, Saban Brands was credited with the production of the English dub. The first fifteen episodes began streaming on Netflix on August 18, 2017. The second season, also consisting of fifteen episodes, was released on November 10, 2017. DokiDoki! is the third installment of the series to receive an English dub, the second and last adaptation of the language under the Glitter Force brand, as well as the last anime to be dubbed by Saban Brands following the company's closure in June 2018. As of June 14, 2018, Hasbro owns the rights and names to the series and brand, along with other Saban Brands entertainment assets.

The international English dub was removed from Netflix on November 9, 2024, alongside Glitter Force.

== Plot ==
After an evil force known as the Jikochu (ジコチュー, Jikochū; Saban: Mercenares) attacks Trump Kingdom (トランプ王国, Toranpu Ōkoku; Saban: Splendorius) its ruler, Princess Marie Ange, goes missing. Makoto, a warrior who served Marie Ange, flees to Earth with her fairy partner and a trio of young fairies to find her and girls who can become Pretty Cures to save the kingdom.

Sharuru (Saban: Kippie), one of the fairies, finds enthusiastic middle-school student Mana (Saban: Maya) during a visit to the Clover Tower. When a monster called a Jikochu (Saban: Distain), which is formed from a person's selfish desires, attacks, Mana gains the ability to transform into Cure Heart (Saban: Glitter Heart) using Sharuru's power and items called Cure Loveads (キュアラビーズ, Kyua Rabīzu; Saban: Glitter Charms) and a smartphone-like device called a Lovely Commune (ラブリーコミューン, Raburī Komyūn; Saban: Glitter Pad). Along with her friends Rikka and Alice, as well as Makoto and the mysterious girl Aguri Madoka, who later joins them, they become Pretty Cure to save Trump Kingdom while protecting people's hearts from selfishness and the Jikochu.

== Characters ==
=== Pretty Cures ===
The Cures transform using the power of the Cure Loveads (キュアラビーズ, Kyua Rabīzu; Saban: Glitter Charms), which they place in a smartphone-like device called the Lovely Commune (ラブリーコミューン, Raburī Komyūn; Saban: Glitter Pad). To transform, they say the phrase Pretty Cure, Love Link! (プリキュア ラブリンク!, Purikyua Rabu Rinku!; Saban: Glitter Force Makeover!) and trace out the letters L-O-V-E on their devices. The Loveads can enhance their powers and allow them to use new attacks, with them later gaining the Love Heart Arrow and the Magical Lovely Pad, which allow them to use more powerful purification attacks. They introduce themselves with the phrase: "Listen to the heartbeat of love! DokiDoki! Pretty Cure!" (響け愛の鼓動！ドキドキ！プリキュア, Hibike ai no kodō! DokiDoki! Purikyua!; Saban: All together, Glitter Force Doki Doki!).

Mana Aida (相田 マナ, Aida Mana; Saban: Maya Aida) / Cure Heart (キュアハート, Kyua Hāto; Saban: Glitter Heart)
Voiced by: Hitomi Nabatame (Japanese); Debi Derryberry (English)
The main protagonist. An energetic 14-year-old girl who is the president of the student council at Ōgai First Public Middle School (大貝第一中学, Ōgai Daiichi Chūgaku; Saban: Sea Shell Bay Middle School). Her family owns the local yoshoku restaurant Pigtail (ぶたのしっぽ, Buta no Shippo; "The Pig's Tail"). She strives to help others and believes that actions speak louder than words, but often acts impulsively and at the expense of herself. Others look up to her for her responsible and hardworking personality. Her fairy partner is Sharuru.
As Cure Heart, her pink hair turns bright blond and is worn in a ponytail. Her theme color is pink and her playing card motif is the heart. She introduces herself as "Overflowing love! Cure Heart!" (みなぎる愛！キュアハート！, Minagiru ai! Kyua Hāto!; Saban: The power of love! I'm Glitter Heart!)
Rikka Hishikawa (菱川 六花, Hishikawa Rikka; Saban: Rachel Larsen) / Cure Diamond (キュアダイヤモンド, Kyua Daiyamondo; Saban: Glitter Diamond)
Voiced by: Minako Kotobuki (Japanese); Cassandra Lee Morris (English)
A girl around 14-15 years old who is Mana's childhood friend, having known her since she moved into her neighbourhood ten years ago, and often helps her. She is the secretary of the student council at Ōgai First Public Middle School and is ranked among the top ten in the country in performing on national mock exams. Her father is a photographer who often travels, so she writes letter to him to keep in touch. Her fairy partner is Raquel.
As Cure Diamond, her dark blue hair turns light blue and is worn in a ponytail. Her theme colour is blue, her playing card motif is the diamond, and she has the power of ice. She introduces herself as "The light of wisdom! Cure Diamond!" (英知の光！キュアダイヤモンド！！, Eichi no Hikari! Kyua Daiyamondo!!; Saban: The light of wisdom! Glitter Diamond!)
Alice Yotsuba (四葉 ありす, Yotsuba Arisu; Saban: Clara Yotsuba) / Cure Rosetta (キュアロゼッタ, Kyua Rozetta; Saban: Glitter Clover)
Voiced by: Mai Fuchigami (Japanese); Melissa Fahn (English)
A 13/14-year-old girl who is a childhood friend of Mana and Rikka, having known them in elementary school when she was young and they defended her from bullies.^{Ep. 3} She comes from a wealthy family that owns the Clover Tower and many businesses in town and attends the prestigious Private Nanatsubashi Academy. As a child, she learned martial arts from her grandfather, but her experiences fighting bullies made her fear her own strength and she vowed never to fight again. She learns of the Pretty Cure from the Clover Tower security footage of Mana's transformation and is initially unwilling to fight because of her vow, but realizes that she must fight to protect those important to her. Her fairy partner is Lance.
As Cure Rosetta, her brown hair turns orange and is worn in long curly twintails. She has the power to produce protective barriers. Her theme color is orange and her playing card motif is the clover. She introduces herself as "The warmth of the sun! Cure Rosetta!" (陽だまりポカポカ！キュアロゼッタ！, Hidamari poka-poka! Kyua Rozetta!; Saban: As warm and bright as the sun! I'm Glitter Clover!)
Makoto Kenzaki (剣崎 真琴, Kenzaki Makoto; Saban: Mackenzie Mack) / Cure Sword (キュアソード, Kyua Sōdo; Saban: Glitter Spade)
Voiced by: Kanako Miyamoto (Japanese); Stephanie Sheh (English)
A 14-year-old girl who was the royal songstress of Trump Kingdom and the last of the previous generation of Pretty Cure. She has a strong sense of responsibility toward the princess of Trump Kingdom, Marie Ange, who she was separated from following the Jikochu's invasion. After arriving on Earth, she takes on a human alias and becomes a pop singer/idol in hopes that her voice will one day reach her. Being from another world, she is generally unfamiliar with Earth's customs. While initially reluctant to work with the Cures, over time she opens up and reveals her identity to them, accepting their offer to help her find Marie Ange, and enrolling in Mana and Rikka's school. Her fairy partner is Davi.
As Cure Sword, her true Trump Kingdom form, her dark purple hair turns light purple and is worn in a ponytail. Her theme color is purple and her playing card motif is the spade. She introduces herself as "The blade of courage! Cure Sword!" (勇気の刃！キュアソード！, Yūki no Yaiba! Kyua Sōdo!; Saban: The blade of courage! Glitter Spade)
Aguri Madoka (円 亜久里, Madoka Aguri; Saban: Natalie Miller) / Cure Ace (キュアエース, Kyua Ēsu; Saban: Glitter Ace)
Voiced by: Rie Kugimiya (Japanese); Erica Lindbeck (English)
A mysterious 10/11-year-old girl and fourth-grade student who debuts to protect the Cures from Regina. She is level-headed and wise, but strict, lecturing the Cures and pushing them to become stronger; despite this, she is fond of Ai, her fairy partner. Prior to the events of the series, Aguri became a Pretty Cure and was separated from Ai, who reverted to an egg, after failing to seal away King Jikochu, and does not remember anything before being taken in by her grandmother, Mari. After the Royal Crystals are gathered, Aguri is reunited with Ai and resumes her duties as a Cure. Aguri is later revealed to be one half of Marie Ange, born from her good side: the part of her that wants to protect her people. She believes that she is destined to fight Regina, whom she considers to be her older sister.
As Cure Ace, her transformation lasts for five minutes, but this time limit is removed after she touches the Eternal Golden Crown. Unlike the other Cures, she transforms using the Love Eyes Palette (ラブアイズパレット, Rabu Aizu Paretto) provided by Ai with the phrase "Pretty Cure, Dress Up!" (プリキュア・ドレスアップ！, PuriKyua, Doresu Appu!; Saban: Glitter Force Makeover!). She wields a lipstick/sword-like weapon called the Love Kiss Rouge (ラブキッスルージュ, Rabu Kisu Rūju; Saban: Glitter Sparkle Stick), which allows her to use different powers depending on the color of the lipstick and is used for purification. Her theme color is red and her card motif is the Ace. She introduces herself as "The trump card of love! Cure Ace!" (愛の切り札！キュアエース！, Ai no kirifuda! Kyua Ēsu!; Saban: "A" for absolutely fabulous. I'm Glitter Ace!)

=== Trump Kingdom ===
Trump Kingdom (トランプ王国, Toranpu Ōkoku; Saban: Splendorius) is a kingdom where the fairies, as well as Makoto, Joe, and Marie Ange, are from. Prior to the events of the series, it was attacked by the Jikochu and Marie Ange went missing. After the final battle, it becomes a republic after King Trump decides to retire from the throne and Joe becomes its president.

Sharuru (シャルル; Saban: Kippie)
Voiced by: Kumiko Nishihara (Japanese); Tara Sands (English)
A pink rabbit-like fairy (Saban: pixie) and Mana's partner, who is passionate and outgoing and later gains the ability to transform into a human. She is named after Charles, the King of Hearts in the traditional Paris court card game of playing cards.
Rakeru (ラケル; Saban: Rory)
Voiced by: Yuka Terasaki (Japanese); Stephanie Sheh (English)
A blue dog-like fairy (Saban: pixie) and Rikka's partner, who later gains the ability to transform into a human. He is named after Rachel, the Queen of Diamonds in the traditional Paris court card game of playing cards.
Lance (ランス, Ransu)
Voiced by: Ayaka Ohashi (Japanese); Bryce Papenbrook (English)
A yellow bear-like fairy (Saban: pixie) and Alice's partner, who later gains the ability to transform into a human. He is named after Lancelot, the Knave of Clubs.
Davi (ダビィ, Dabī)
Voiced by: Yumi Uchiyama (Japanese); Erica Mendez (English)
A purple cat-like fairy (Saban: pixie) and Makoto's partner, who often worries about her and tends to blurt out her true feelings, much to her embarrassment. She can transform into an adult human who acts as Makoto's manager and her adult guardian. She is named after David, the King of Spades.
Joe Okada (ジョー岡田, Jō Okada; Saban: Jonathan "Johnny" Klondike)
Voiced by: Takahiro Sakurai (Japanese); Grant George (English)
A salesman who gives the Cures their Cure Loveads and runs a knick-knack booth near the Clover Tower^{ep. 1} and later opens a shop in the neighborhood.^{ep. 2} Though he initially pretends to know nothing about Trump Kingdom, he eventually reveals his true identity as Jonathan Klondike (ジョナサン・クロンダイク, Jonasan Kurondaiku), a royal knight of Trump Kingdom and Marie's fiancé, who traveled to Earth to search for her after the Jikochu attacked the kingdom. After the final battle, Jonathan becomes the president of Trump Kingdom after it becomes a republic.
Princess Marie Ange (マリー・アンジュ王女, Marī Anju Ōjo; Saban: Princess Marie Angelica)
Voiced by: Yuka Imai (Japanese); Kate Higgins (English)
The princess of Trump Kingdom, who went missing after the Jikochu attacked the kingdom. It is later revealed that she fell ill a year prior to the series' events, and her father, King Trump, wanted to find a way to cure her using the Eternal Golden Crown, one of the Three Sacred Treasures. However, the Crown was used to imprison Proto Jikochu, whom the legendary Pretty Cure had sealed away, and it possessed him, transforming him into King Jikochu. When he and the Jikochu invaded the kingdom, Marie Ange sent Sharuru and the fairies to Earth before attempting to escape with Makoto, but was separated from her. When Bel attempted to transform her into a Jikochu, she split her Psyche into Aguri and Regina, who embodied her love for her father and her kingdom, respectively, and her body was transformed into the egg from which Ai emerged. She is believed to have been sealed in a crystal until Aguri reveals the truth and Mana tries to stop her and Regina from killing each other. After the final battle, her disembodied spirit informs them that the process cannot be undone and goes to the afterlife to join her mother, but tells them that she will live on through Aguri and Regina.
Ai (アイちゃん, Ai-chan; Saban: Dina)
Voiced by: Yuka Imai (Japanese); Kate Higgins (English)
A mysterious winged baby based on the cupid who the Cures care for after she hatches from an egg that Joe found. After Aguri's debut, Ai is revealed to be her partner, who, prior to the events of the series, gained the ability to transform into Cure Ace. When King Jikochu defeated Aguri, Ai reverted to an egg and was separated from her, but is later reunited with her after the Royal Crystals are gathered. She initially lives with Joe, but later uses her magic to convince Mana's family that she is her sister and stays at her house. She has various magical abilities, such as weakening a Jikochu's influence, causing the opposite effect when in a bad mood. She is later revealed to have been created from Marie's body after she splintered her Psyche.

=== Jikochu ===
The Jikochu (ジコチュー; lit. "selfishnesses", Saban: Mercenares) are led by the king of Trump Kingdom, who was possessed by Proto Jikochu, whom the legendary Pretty Cure had sealed away, and was transformed into King Jikochu. Their goal is to transform selfish desires into "Janergy" (ジャネジー, Janejī) in order to revive their leader and create more of their kind. King Jikochu and his generals each represent one of the Seven Deadly Sins.

==== Leaders ====
King Jikochu (キングジコチュー; lit. "King Selfish", Saban: King Mercenare)
Voiced by: Hōchū Ōtsuka (Japanese); Patrick Seitz (English)
The leader of the Jikochu, who is later revealed to be Marie Ange's father King Trump (キング トランプ, Kingū Toranpu; Saban: King of Splendorious). After she fell ill, he resolved to cure her, but unsealing the Eternal Golden Crown released Proto Jikochu, who possessed him and transformed him into King Jikochu. He then created an army of Jikochu from his subjects and attacked the kingdom before Marie Ange sealed him in stone. His generals work to revive him using the energy from people's Psyches, eventually resurrecting him to invade Earth.^{ep. 46} The Cures save him after Marie Ange's incarnation extracts him and they destroy King Jikochu, leaving a fragment containing Proto Jikochu behind. In the aftermath, King Trump retires and Joe Okada is made the president of the Trump Kingdom after it becomes a republic. King Jikochu represents the sin of Pride.
Proto Jikochu (プロトジコチュー; lit. "Proto Selfish", Saban: Proto Mercenare)
Voiced by: Masami Iwasaki (Japanese); Ray Chase (English)
An evil entity who the three legendary Pretty Cure sealed within the Eternal Golden Crown 10,000 years ago. It was released after King Trump broke its seal when he used the Eternal Golden Crown to find a way to cure his daughter Marie Ange, possessing him and causing him to become King Jikochu. After King Jikochu is destroyed, Proto Jikochu uses Bel as its new host before being killed by Cure Heart in her Pantheon Mode. Proto Jikochu represents original sin.
Regina (レジーナ, Rejīna)
Voiced by: Kumiko Watanabe (Japanese); Cherami Leigh (English)
A mischievous and spoiled girl who serves as the Jikochu Trio's second-in-command, having the ability to create Jikochu from selfless people, and claims to be King Jikochu's daughter. She briefly possessed the red Royal Crystal, which made her more cruel and violent. After befriending Mana and the Cures, Regina begins to reconsider her actions, but King Jikochu brainwashes her back into evil. After being wounded in her battle with Cure Ace, she is put in sleep/suspended animation to be revived, later awakening and returning to lead the Jikochu Trio. She later takes the Miracle Dragon Glaive after her feelings reach King Jikochu, transforming its power into that of darkness. During the final battle, she is revealed to have been born from Marie Ange's inner darkness, embodying her desire to protect her father, and, after remembering her friendship with Mana and the Cures, allies with them to save King Trump and stop King Jikochu. Regina represents the sin of Lust and her name is derived from Latin for queen.
At the end of the series, she redeems herself as an ally of the Cures and begins attending Mana's school. Regina becomes a key figure in the epilogue novel, questioning her worth as an ally to the Cures before learning she all the traits needed to be one herself. When Aguri loses her ability to become Cure Ace, Regina temporary merges with her to become Cure Joker (キュアジョーカー, Kyua Jōka).
As Cure Joker, Regina's theme color is purple and red with her card motif being the Joker. She introduces herself as "The last trump card, Cure Joker! Want to try an exciting rendezvous with me?" (最後の切り札、キュアジョーカー！私とわくわくランデヴーしてみない, Saigo no kirifuda, Kyua Jōkā! Watashi to wakuwaku randevū shite minai?)

==== Commanders ====
The agents were previously composed of seven members, each embodying the Seven Deadly Sins. Bel, Marmo, and Ira compose the Selfish Trio (ジコチュートリオ, Jikochū Torio; Saban: Mercenare Trio).

Bel (ベール, Bēru)
Voiced by: Kazuhiro Yamaji (Japanese); Ray Chase (English)
The leader of the Jikochu Trio, who faces the Cures early on in the series. After killing off Leva and Gula for their Janergy, Bel creates the Blood Rings to give power to Ira and Marmo and force them to serve him, but later loses the Rings after the Cures destroy them and is deposed upon Regina's return. In the final episode, he attempts to gain power by consuming the surviving fragment of King Jikochu, but becomes a vessel for Proto Jikochu and is purified back into his true form, a rat with bat wings, upon its death. He represents the sin of Sloth, and his name is derived from Belphegor, the demon who represents it.
Marmo (マーモ, Māmo)
Voiced by: Atsuko Tanaka (Japanese); Carrie Keranen (English)
A bossy woman who can consume the dark hearts that form the Jikochu to transform into a powerful monster. Following the final battle, she and Ira surrender after the defeat of Proto Jikochu. She represents the sin of Greed, and her name is derived from Marmon, the demon who represents it.
Ira (イーラ, Īra)
Voiced by: Mayumi Tanaka (Japanese); Benjamin Diskin (English)
A bratty and short-tempered teenager and one of the members of the Selfish Trio. He falls in love with Rikka as she cares for him after he is struck by lightning and gains amnesia, and, though he returns to evil after regaining his memories, defends the Cures from Gula's attack. Following the final battle, he and Marmo surrender and flee following the defeat of Proto Jikochu. He represent the sin of Wrath, and his name is derived from the Latin for it.
Leva (リーヴァ, Rīva)
Voiced by: Nobuo Tobita (Japanese); Todd Haberkorn (English)
A bearded man who speaks in an effeminate manner and refers to Bel with the suffix "-chan". After being defeated by the Lovely Straight Flush in their fused form, Bel kills him and Gula for their Janergy. He represents Envy, and his name is derived from the Leviathan, the demon who represents it.
Gula (グーラ, Gūra)
Voiced by: Masuo Amada (Japanese); Jamieson Price (English)
A hulking and muscular man with very sharp teeth who likes to eat and can bite through anything. After being defeated by the Lovely Straight Flush in their fused form, Bel kills him and Leva for their Janergy. He represents Gluttony, and his name is derived from the Spanish for it.
Lust (ルスト, Rusuto) and Goma (ゴーマ, Gōma; Pride)
Two commanders who were sealed away during the Jikochuu invasion of the Trump Kingdom by Makoto's comrades, who sacrificed themselves with Makoto assuming they all died. The two were later released and serve as antagonists in the epilogue novel.

==== Grunts ====
Jikochu (ジコチュー; lit. "selfishness", Saban: Distains)
Voiced by: Masami Iwasaki (Japanese); Bryce Papenbrook, Christopher Niosi, Keith Silverstein, Neil Kaplan, Kirk Thornton, Michelle Ruff (English)
Monsters born from the selfish thoughts of a person's heart and are created when a Jikochu general influences a person to dwell on those thoughts, causing them to fall into a coma and release a blackened heart with bat wings known as a Psyche (プシュケー, Pushukē; Saban: Hearts) which forms the core of a Jikochu. After a Jikochu is purified, the Psyche becomes a heart with angel wings as it returns to its owner.

=== Other recurring characters ===
Sebastian (セバスチャン, Sebasuchan)
Voiced by: Izo Oikawa (Japanese); Kirk Thornton (English)
Alice's butler who is aware of the Cures' secret identities and assists them by providing intel and containing leaks of their existence to the public.
Kentaro Aida (相田健太郎, Aida Kentarō)
Voiced by: Nobuaki Kanemitsu (Japanese); Kyle Hebert (English)
Mana's father who works at the Pigtail as a chef.
Ayumi Aida (相田あゆみ, Aida Ayumi)
Voiced by: Harumi Ueda (Japanese); Laura Post (English)
Mana's mother who runs the Pigtail and handles orders.
Sokichi Bando (坂東宗吉, Bandō Sōkichi)
Voiced by: Akihiko Ishizumi (Japanese); Kyle Hebert (English)
Mana's grandfather who often argues with Kentaro over their cooking skills.
Reina Itsutsuboshi (五星麗奈, Itsutsuboshi Reina; Saban: Nellie Knotty)
Voiced by: Hyo-sei (Japanese); Laura Post (English)
Alice's rival, a rich girl who often bullies her.
Mr. Kido (城戸先生, Kido-sensei; Saban: Mr. Kittredge)
Voiced by: Issei Maeda (Japanese); Patrick Seitz (English)
The homeroom teacher at Oogai First Middle School.

=== Others ===
Cure Empress (キュアエンプレス, Kyua Enpuresu; Saban: Glitter Empress)
Voiced by: Mayumi Iizuka
A girl who became a Cure 10,000 years ago and fought against the forces of Jikochu alongside Cure Magician and Cure Priestess. She was the leader of the trio and the wielder of the Magical Lovely Pad (マジカルラブリーパッド, Majikaru Raburī Paddo; Saban: Glitter Crystal Pad), and her fairy partner was Melan. She is named after The Empress, the third of the Major Arcana.
Cure Magician (キュアマジシャン, Kyua Majishan)
A girl who became a Cure 10,000 years ago and fought against the forces of Jikochu alongside Cure Empress and Cure Priestess. She was the wielder of the Miracle Dragon Glaive (ミラクルドラゴングレイブ, Mirakuru Doragon Gureibu). She is named after The Juggler, the first of the Major Arcana which is also known as The Magician.
Cure Priestess (キュアプリーステス, Kyua Purīsutesu)
A girl who became a Cure 10,000 years ago and fought against the forces of Jikochu alongside Cure Empress and Cure Magician. She was the wielder of the Eternal Golden Crown (エターナルゴールデンクラウン, Etānaru Gōruden Kuraun; Saban: Golden Crown of Wisdom). She is named after The Popess, the second of the Major Arcana also known as The Priestess.
Melan (メラン, Meran; Saban: Mora)
Voiced by: Yōko Matsuoka
A turtle-like fairy who can take on a draconic form and was Cure Empress's partner, aiding her in their battle against the Jikochu 10,000 years ago. In the present, she puts the Cures through a trial to determine if they are worthy of possessing the Magical Lovely Pad.
Regina (レジーナ, Rejīna)
Voiced by: Kumiko Watanabe (Japanese); Cherami Leigh (English)
A mischievous and spoiled girl who serves as the Jikochu Trio's second-in-command, having the ability to create Jikochu from selfless people, and claims to be King Jikochu's daughter. She briefly possessed the red Royal Crystal, which made her more cruel and violent. After befriending Mana and the Cures, Regina begins to reconsider her actions, but King Jikochu brainwashes her back into evil. After being wounded in her battle with Cure Ace, she is put in sleep/suspended animation to be revived, later awakening and returning to lead the Jikochu Trio. She later takes the Miracle Dragon Glaive after her feelings reach King Jikochu, transforming its power into that of darkness. During the final battle, she is revealed to have been born from Marie Ange's inner darkness, embodying her desire to protect her father, and, after remembering her friendship with Mana and the Cures, allies with them to save King Trump and stop King Jikochu. At the end of the series, she redeems herself, becomes an ally of the Cures, and begins attending Mana's school.

=== Movie characters ===
Marsh (マシュー, Mashuu)
Voiced by: Shōsuke Tanihara
A man who carries a clarinet and harbors hatred towards Mana. He declares himself to be "the king of the world of memories" and seeks to trap people in their past memories. It is later revealed that he is Mallow (マロ, Maro), Mana's beloved dog who died in a car accident.
Mannequin Carmine (マネキンカーマイン, Manekinkāmain)
Voiced by: Mayumi Asano
A woman based on a harlequin and created from mannequins, who is one of Marsh's servants.
Silver Clock (シルバークロック, Shirubākurokku)
Voiced by: Minoru Inaba
A clock-like creature created from a grandfather clock, who is one of Marsh's servants.
Purple Buggy (パープルバギー, Pāpurubagī)
Voiced by: Hisao Egawa
A skeletal biker created from an engine and bike, who is one of Marsh's servants.
Bebel (べベル, Beberu)
Voiced by: Kazuko Sugiyama
A mysterious fairy who helps the fairies save the Cures and stop Marsh. She is later revealed to be Mana's late grandmother, Isuzu Bando (坂東いすず, Bando Isuzu).
Clarinet (クラリネット, Kurarinetto)
Voiced by: Masaru Ikeda
A demon who resembles a clarinet and is the true villain of the movie, being the true form of Marsh's clarinet. After Marsh fails to destroy Mana, it attacks Mana's future self at her wedding in an attempt to destroy the future, but is defeated by Cure Heart in her Engage Mode.

== Media ==
=== Anime ===
The series aired on ABC and other ANN stations between February 3, 2013, and January 26, 2014. Marvelous AQL began releasing the series on DVD from May 29, 2013, and on Blu-ray Disc from September 27, 2013.

Saban Brands, under its SCG Characters unit, produced an English dub of the series, titled Glitter Force: Doki Doki. The English dub abridged the original forty-nine episodes into thirty. The first season was released on Netflix on August 18, 2017, comprising 15 episodes and covering multiple languages. Doki Doki is the second series and last to be released under the Glitter Force brand following Toei's acquisition of the trademark from Saban Brands. However, Saban Brands was still credited with the production of the English dub. The show is currently licensed by Hasbro.

==== Films ====
DokiDoki Pretty Cures made their theatrical debut in the Pretty Cure All Stars film, Pretty Cure All Stars New Stage 2: Friends of the Heart (プリキュアオールスターズ New Stage 2 こころのともだち, PuriKyua Ōru Sutāzu Nyū Sutēji Tsū: Kokoro no Tomodachi), which was released in Japanese theatres on March 16, 2013, with an official soundtrack released on March 13, 2013. A film based on the series, titled DokiDoki! Precure the Movie: Mana Kekkon!!? Mirai ni Tsunagu Kibō no Doresu (映画 ドキドキ!プリキュア マナ結婚!!? 未来につなぐ希望のドレス, Eiga DokiDoki! Purikyua: Mana Kekkon!!? Mirai ni Tsunagu Kibō no Doresu; DokiDoki! PreCure the Movie: Mana's Getting Married!!? The Dress of Hope That Connects to the Future), was released on October 26, 2013, and the official soundtrack on October 23, 2013.

==== Music ====
The series uses three pieces of theme music, one opening and two ending themes. The opening theme is "Happy Go Lucky! DokiDoki! Precure" (Happy Go Lucky！ドキドキ！プリキュア, Happy Go Lucky! DokiDoki! Purikyua) by Tomoyo Kurosawa. The ending theme for the first 26 episodes is "Kono Sora no Mukō" (この空の向こう; "Beyond the Sky") whilst the ending theme for the remaining 23 episodes is "Love Link" (ラブリンク, Rabu Rinku), both performed by Hitomi Yoshida. The opening theme is composed by Chiho Kiyooka, ending themes by Dr. Usui, and background music by Hiroshi Takaki. An image song album featuring songs performed by Kanako Miyamoto as Cure Sword, titled "Songbird", was released by Marvelous AQL on May 29, 2013, alongside the original soundtrack's first volume, Pretty Cure Sound Love Link.

The first vocal soundtrack, titled DokiDoki! PreCure Vocal Album 1: Jump Up, Girls! (ドキドキ！プリキュア ボーカルアルバム1 ~Jump up, GIRLS!~), was released on July 17, 2013. The second vocal album for the series entitled ~100% PRECURE DAYS☆~ was released on November 6, 2013. Then on November 20, the second original soundtrack for the series was released under the title Pretty Cure Sound Arrow. On January 15, 2014, the vocal best album for the series was released.

For Glitter Force: Doki Doki, Noam Kaniel – who worked on X-Men, Code Lyoko, W.I.T.C.H., Power Rangers, Digimon Fusion, Miraculous Ladybug, and Glitter Force – composed the "Glitter Force: Doki Doki Theme Song" and it was performed by the Asian girl group Blush, who previously performed the Glitter Force theme song, which is a remix of the original, and some lyrics were replaced.

=== Manga ===
A manga adaptation by Futago Kamikita began serialization in Kodansha's Nakayoshi magazine in March 2013 and ended in February 2014.

=== Merchandise ===
Merchandise of the anime were also issued during the series's initial run, including bags, watches, raincoats, etc. Several toys featuring the Cure's transformation devices and weapons were also released by Bandai during the series' airing.

=== Video games ===
The characters in the series appear in the dancing video game, PreCure All Stars: Everyone Gather, Let's Dance! (プリキュアオールスターズ ぜんいんしゅうごう☆レッツダンス！, Purikyua Ōru Sutāzu: Zen'in Shūgō Rettsu Dansu!), which was released for the Wii in Japan on March 28, 2013. A game based on the series, DokiDoki! PreCure Narikiri Life! (ドキドキ!プリキュア なりきりライフ!, Dokidoki! Purikyua Narikiri Raifu!), was released by Bandai for Nintendo 3DS on August 1, 2013.

=== Novel ===
A novel, which is set one year after the events of the series, was released on September 17, 2024. Series writer Ryōta Yamaguchi wrote the novel, while Akira Takahashi drew the cover art.

== Notes ==
Preceded by Smile PreCure!	DokiDoki! PreCure; 2013-2014	Succeeded by HappinessCharge PreCure!
