= The Undivided EP =

EP by Blush
- Released: May 10, 2012
- Recorded: in 2010-12 in Hong Kong, Los Angeles
- Genre: Pop
- Language: English
- Label: FarWest Entertainment

Singles from The Undivided EP
- 1. "Undivided" Released: May 3, 2010; 2. "All Stars" Released: April 9, 2012; 3. "Dance On" Released: April 23, 2012; 4. "Warrior" Released: February 14, 2013

The Undivided EP is the first extended play by Asian girl group Blush. It was released digitally on May 10, 2012, under FarWest Entertainment.

== Charting ==
Three songs from the EP have charted in the Billboard Dance Chart: "Undivided" (#3), "Dance On" (#1) and "All Stars" (#14)

== Track listing ==
No.	Title	Writer(s)	Length
1.	"Undivided (feat. Snoop Dogg)"	Jess Cates, Lindy Robbins, Reed Vertelney, Snoop Dogg	3:57
2.	"All Stars"	Lars Halvor Jensen, Johannes "Josh" Jørgensen, Montana Tucker	3:27
3.	"Warrior"	Daniel Obi Klein, Alex James, Jensen, Jørgensen	4:05
4.	"Sweetly Leave Me"	Gary Barlow, Eliot Kennedy, Shaznay Lewis, Lucie Silvas	3:34
5.	"Together We're Greater"	James Jayawardena, Kennedy, Lewis, Shelly Poole	3:37
6.	"Undivided (Dave Audé Radio Mix)"		3:37
7.	"Dance On (WAWA Radio Mix)"	Jem Godfrey, Kennedy, Karen Poole	3:11
8.	"Undivided (Morgan Page Radio Mix)"		3:52
9.	"Dance On (Razor N' Guido Radio Mix)"		4:08
