= Smile PreCure! =

Japanese anime television series

- 1st Japanese DVD volume of Smile Precure! distributed by Marvelous AQL, featuring the five Cures (from bottom left clockwise): Peace (yellow), Beauty (blue), March (green), Sunny (orange), Happy (pink, top center) and mascot Candy (bottom center).

スマイルプリキュア! (Sumairu PuriKyua!)
- Genre: Magical girl
- Created by: Izumi Todo
- Anime television series
- Directed by: Takashi Otsuka
- Produced by: Atsutoshi Umezawa
- Written by: Shōji Yonemura
- Music by: Yasuharu Takanashi (JP); Noam Kaniel (Noam) (US)
- Studio: Toei Animation
- Licensed by: NA: Saban Brands (2015–2017) Toei Animation/Allspark Animation & Hasbro Entertainment (2017/18 & 19–present; licensing) Netflix (2015–24; streaming rights)
- Original network: ANN (ABC, TV Asahi)
- English network: UK: London Live; US: Netflix
- Original run: February 5, 2012 – January 27, 2013
- Episodes: 48 (Japanese and other Asian versions)
- Manga
- Written by: Izumi Todo
- Illustrated by: Futago Kamikita
- Published by: Kodansha
- Magazine: Nakayoshi
- Original run: March 2012 – February 2013
- Volumes: 1
- Video game

Smile PreCure! Let's Go! Märchen World
- Developer: Namco Bandai Games
- Publisher: Namco Bandai Games
- Genre: Minigame
- Platform: Nintendo 3DS
- Released: August 2, 2012
- Anime film

Smile PreCure! The Movie: Big Mismatch in a Picture Book!
- Directed by: Narumi Kuroda
- Written by: Shoji Yonemura
- Studio: Toei Animation
- Released: October 27, 2012
- Runtime: 70 minutes

Smile PreCure! (Japanese: スマイルプリキュア！, Hepburn: Sumairu PuriKyua!; lit. "Smile Pretty Cure!") is a 2012 Japanese anime television series produced by Toei Animation and the ninth installment in Izumi Todo's Pretty Cure metaseries, featuring the seventh generation of Cures. The series is written by Shōji Yonemura, best known as the head writer of Glass Fleet and Kamen Rider Kabuto. The character designs were done by Toshie Kawamura, who previously worked on character designs for Yes! PreCure 5. Like Yes! Pretty Cure 5, the team has five members with a color scheme of pink, red, yellow, green, and blue, but unlike it the team's members are classmates in their second year of middle school. There are no additional team members. The series aired on All-Nippon News Network (ANN)'s TV Asahi network between February 5, 2012, and January 27, 2013, replacing Suite PreCure♪ in its timeslot, and was succeeded by DokiDoki! PreCure. A film was released in Japanese theaters on October 26, 2012, and a novel was released in 2016, serving as an epilogue that takes place 10 years after the anime's events. An illustration book of Toshie Kawamura's works was released on February 12, 2014. The series' main topics are fairy tales and happiness.

The series was adapted into English by Saban Brands under the name Glitter Force and was released as a Netflix exclusive outside of Asia and in multiple languages on December 18, 2015. As of May 24, 2017, the Glitter Force trademark and the license are owned by Toei Animation. As of June 14, 2018, Hasbro currently owns the rights to the brand alongside other Saban Brands entertainment assets. It is the second series in the franchise to receive an English-dubbed adaptation, after the original Pretty Cure series.

The English dub was removed from Netflix on November 9, 2024, alongside Glitter Force: Doki Doki.

== Plot ==
The kingdom of Märchenland (メルヘンランド, Meruhenrando; Saban: Jubiland), the home of various characters from fairy tales, is attacked by the evil Pierrot, who intends to give the world an unhappy ending, but is stopped when the queen uses the last of her energy to seal him away. When Pierrot's minions from the Bad End Kingdom plan to revive him by harnessing Bad End Energy from the people of Earth, the queen sends the fairy Candy to assemble a team of five magical girls. The series follows the formation of the team and their adventures as they fight off their enemies to collect the Cure Decor, which embodies the queen's power of happiness and can be used to upgrade their powers and revive the queen.

== Characters ==
=== Main characters ===
The titular characters are a team of magical girls whose secret base is the Magical Library (ふしぎ図書館, Fushigi Toshokan; Saban: Library of Legends), a pocket dimension where fairy tales and stories are stored. They collect the Cure Decors (キュアデコル, Kyua Dekoru; Saban: Glitter Charms), which are stored in a jewelry box called the Decor Décor (デコルデコール, Dekoru Dekōru; Saban: Charm Chest) and are needed to revive the queen. The girls place the items in a compact case called a Smile Pact (スマイルパクト, Sumairu Pakuto; Saban: Glitter Pact), applying the compact powder to themselves while shouting Pretty Cure, Smile Charge! (プリキュア、スマイルチャージ！, PuriKyua, Sumairu Chāji!; Saban: Glitter Force Makeover!) to transform.

=== Pretty Cures ===
Miyuki Hoshizora (星空 みゆき, Hoshizora Miyuki; Saban: Emily) / Cure Happy (キュアハッピー, Kyua Happī; Saban: Glitter Lucky)
Voiced by: Misato Fukuen (Japanese); Laura Bailey (English)
The main protagonist. A transfer student to Nanairogaoka Middle School (七色ヶ丘中学校, Nanairogaoka Chūgakō), who loves fairy tales. She is energetic and optimistic, but clumsy. Her theme color is pink, and she has the power of light. She introduces herself with "Twinkling and shining, the light of the future! Cure Happy!" (キラキラ輝く未来の光！キュアハッピー！, Kirakira kagayaku mirai no hikari! Kyua Happī!; Saban: "A fabulous shimmer! A glow in your heart! I'm Glitter Lucky!").
Akane Hino (日野 あかね, Hino Akane; Saban: Kelsey) / Cure Sunny (キュアサニー, Kyua Sanī; Saban: Glitter Sunny)
Voiced by: Asami Tano (Japanese); Colleen Ann Villard (English)
A student at Nanairogaoka Middle School and a star member of its volleyball team. She is from Osaka and speaks with a Kansai dialect. Her family runs an okonomiyaki restaurant called Okonomiyaki Akane, which she sometimes works at. Although she often jokes around, she is passionate about what she cares about. Her theme color is orange or red, and she has the power of fire. She introduces herself with "The brilliant sun, hot-blooded power! Cure Sunny!" (太陽サンサン熱血パワー！キュアサニー！, Taiyō sansan nekketsu pawā! Kyua Sanī!; Saban: "When you mess with me, you're playing with fire! I'm Glitter Sunny!").
Yayoi Kise (黄瀬 やよい, Kise Yayoi; Saban: Lily) / Cure Peace (キュアピース, Kyua Pīsu; Saban: Glitter Peace)
Voiced by: Hisako Kanemoto (Japanese); Alex Cazares (English)
A 13-year-old girl who is a student at Nanairogaoka Middle School and a member of its homemaking club. Her father Yuichi died when she was young. She enjoys drawing action hero characters and aspires to be a mangaka. Though timid, shy, and prone to crying, Yayoi is loyal, diligent, and headstrong when it comes to those she cares about. Her theme color is yellow, and she has the powers of lightning and electricity. She introduces herself with "Sparkling, glittering, rock-paper-scissors! Cure Peace!" (ピカピカぴかりんじゃんけんポン ♪ キュアピース！, Pikapika pikarin jankenpon ♪ Kyua Pīsu!; Saban: "Puppies and kittens! The power of love! I'm Glitter Peace!").
Nao Midorikawa (緑川 なお, Midorikawa Nao; Saban: April) / Cure March (キュアマーチ, Kyua Māchi; Saban: Glitter Spring)
Voiced by: Marina Inoue (Japanese); Danielle Judovits (English)
A 14-year-old girl who is a student at Nanairogaoka Middle School and the captain of its soccer team. She is straightforward, reliable, and has a strong sense of justice, though gets frustrated when things don't go her way. She is the oldest of six siblings, taking on a motherly role in her family. Her theme color is green, and she has the powers of wind and super speed. She introduces herself with "Intense courage, a straight-up bout! Cure March!" (勇気リンリン直球勝負！キュアマーチ！, Yūki rinrin chokkyū shōbu! Kyua Māchi!; Saban: "A force as strong as life itself! I'm Glitter Spring!").
Reika Aoki (青木 れいか, Aoki Reika; Saban: Chloe) / Cure Beauty (キュアビューティ, Kyua Byūti; Saban: Glitter Breeze)
Voiced by: Chinami Nishimura (Japanese); Kate Higgins (English)
A 14-year-old girl who is a student at Nanairogaoka Middle School. She is the vice president of its student council and a member of its archery club and art club. She is intelligent, elegant, and kind, but becomes angered once her patience reaches its limits. Her theme color is blue, and she has the power of ice. She introduces herself with "Snowing, falling and gathering, a noble heart! Cure Beauty!" (しんしんと降りつもる清き心！キュアビューティ！, Shinshin to furitsumoru kiyoki kokoro! Kyua Byūti!; Saban: Cool and swift as the winter wind! I'm Glitter Breeze!").

==== Mascots ====
Candy (キャンディ, Kyandi)
Voiced by: Ikue Ōtani (Japanese); Debi Derryberry (English)
A lamb-like fairy with light pink fur and long curly fluffy yellow ears worn with pink bows who is the team's mascot. She is cheerful, energetic, and fashionable, enjoying her ears being styled like hair. The Royale Queen sends her to Earth to recruit the Pretty Cure and recover the stolen Cure Decors, a vital member of the team by providing them with Cure Decors for their power-ups and team attacks and using the Royale Clock to boost their power. In the series finale, it is revealed that Joker knew of her connection to the Miracle Jewel and that her mission was preparing her to succeed Queen as the new ruler of Märchenland. This results in her gaining the ability to transform into the human-like Royale Candy (ロイヤルキャンディ, Roiyaru Kyandi; Saban: Queen Candy) once the Cure Decors are finally gathered, helping her friends in the final battle before assuming her role as Märchenland's sovereign.
Pop (ポップ, Poppu)
Voiced by: Daisuke Sakaguchi (Japanese); Todd Haberkorn (English)
Candy's older brother, a lion-like fairy/pixie with light orange fur and an orange mane who takes pride in his masculinity and hates being called "cute". However, he becomes flustered when Yayoi calls him "fierce and cool". He and Candy were tasked with searching for the five chosen ones to become Pretty Cure. He reunites with Candy once she assembles the group, explaining their mission and giving them the Decor Décor. He usually remains in Märchenland, but usually visits the group during important matters. He is capable of using ninjutsu arts, including transformation into various forms to assist the Pretty Cure in battle.
Royal Queen (ロイヤルクイーン, Roiyaru Kuīn; Saban: Queen Euphoria)
Voiced by: Sumi Shimamoto (Japanese); Mary Elizabeth McGlynn (English)
The Queen of Märchenland and the origin of the fairies/pixies, who regard her as their mother. When Pierrot attacked Märchenland, the Cure Decors were stolen and she sacrificed herself to seal away Pierrot. She sends Candy to search for the Pretty Cure to recover the Cure Decors and restore her power. Though the Pretty Cure gather the Cure Decors, the Royal Queen uses her power to grant them their Princess forms during their battle against Pierrot, with the girls gathering more Cure Decors to make another attempt at reviving her. However, in the series' finale she reveals that her restoration was a ruse when she protects Candy from Joker, revealing her to be her successor as queen and giving her the Miracle Jewel.

=== Bad End Kingdom ===
The Bad End Kingdom (バッドエンド王国, Baddo Endo Ōkoku; Saban: Shadow Realm), are the main antagonists, who strive to revive Emperor Pierrot by collecting Bad End Energy from people. They do this by smearing the pages of a magic book with the contents of a black paint tube, which is a manifestation of Pierrot's will. This creates a spatial field called a Dark Zone, which amplifies negativity and places those unprotected into a deep despair while their Bad End Energy is extracted and collected into the book. This process advances a clock-like meter called the "Wheel of Doom" which counts down Pierrot's resurrection. Joker and the Akanbe are based on clowns, while the three generals are based on villains from fairy tales. The three generals are later revealed to be Märchenland fairies that Joker recruiting by exploiting their resentment over their reputation as villains alienating them from others. They are eventually purified back to their original fairy forms by Miyuki and return to Märchenland after Pierrot's defeat.

Pierrot (ピエーロ, Piēro; Saban: Emperor Nogo)
Voiced by: Tesshō Genda (Japanese); John Eric Bentley (English)
The main antagonist of the series, who aims to wipe out hope until only despair remains. Prior to the series' events, Pierrot attacked Märchenland and stole the Cure Decors from the Royale Queen, who used the last of her strength to seal him away. For the first half of the series, the minions of the Bad End Kingdom collect Bad End Energy from humans to revive Pierrot. Through seemingly defeated once the Pretty Cure gain their Princess forms, Pierrot survived, with a fragment forming into an egg that gradually increases as it is infused with Bad End Energy. Once restored, he absorbs Joker and creates an army of shadowy monsters. He evolves into a new form and almost destroys the world until he is permanently killed by the Pretty Cure.
Joker (ジョーカー, Jōkā; Saban: Rascal)
Voiced by: Yūji Mitsuya (Japanese); Keith Silverstein (English)
The secondary antagonist of the series, who is based on a harlequin and acts as an intermediary to the Three Commanders who observes their progress. He is playful yet sadistic, and has the power to create Akanbe Noses from his headdress. He also seeks the Miracle Jewel with the intention of destroying it and anything that gives others hope. Following the Three Commanders' final defeat, Joker creates the Bad End Pretty Cure to distract the girls during Pierrot's revival while attempting to kill Candy after she transforms into what he assumes is the Miracle Jewel. Once Pierrot's resurrection is complete, Joker reveals himself to be a fragment of his master's being and dissolves into black paint while allowing himself to be absorbed by Pierrot. Joker returns as the main antagonist of the epilogue novel, having survived Pierrot's destruction as an immortal embodiment of despair. He uses Miyuki's book to feed on the adult Pretty Cures' negative energy to regain a physical form as Bad Joker (バッド・ジョーカー, Baddo Jōkā), but is defeated.
Wolfrun (ウルフルン, Urufurun; Saban: Ulric)
Voiced by: Tomoyuki Shimura (Japanese); Keith Silverstein (English)
An anthropomorphic gray wolf with violet eyes and white hair who wears a blue leather outfit that resembles that of a biker. He is bitter and rude and looks down upon peoples' hopes and dreams, expressing disgust towards the Pretty Cures' ideals. He is based on the Big Bad Wolf in fairy tales such as the Three Little Pigs and Little Red Riding Hood. He is eventually purified back to his original form Wolrun (ウルルン; Saban: Ricky).
Akaoni (アカオーニ, Akaōni; Saban: Brute)
Voiced by: Hiroshi Iwasaki (Japanese); Keith Silverstein (English)
A red-skinned troll with an afro and horns who carries a large club. He is based on the oni in fairy tales such as Momotaro. He is not as intelligent as to the other villains. He prefers to use brute force when fighting his opponents. He is eventually purified back to his original form Oninin (オニニン; Saban: Rufus).
Majorina (マジョリーナ, Majorīna; Saban: Brooha)
Voiced by: Miina Tominaga (Japanese); Mary Elizabeth McGlynn (English)
An elderly witch based on the witches in fairy tales such as Snow White. She devises various inventions to use against the girls, which her fellow commanders thoughtlessly throw them into the human world. She can also temporary transform into a youthful and beautiful version of herself to fight opponents directly, and has the power to create clones of herself. She is eventually purified back to her original form Majorin (マジョリン; Saban: Margie).
Akanbes (アカンベェ, Akanbees; Saban: Buffoons)
Voiced by: Hiroo Sasaki (Japanese); Patrick Seitz (English)
Clown-like monsters created when an Akanbe Nose is combined with an object such as a volleyball or a tree. The standard red-nosed Akanbes are created with noses fashioned from a Cure Decor and drop it upon being purified. Joker later creates other types, such as like the blue-nosed Akanbes, his personal yellow-nosed Akanbe, and others.
Despair Giants (絶望の巨人, Zetsubō no Kyojin; Saban: Shadow Giants)
Constructs of Bad End Energy which Pierrot used in his attack on Märchenland. After his resurrection on Earth, the Despair Giants are summoned to cover the planet in darkness before being absorbed by Pierrot.
Pierrot Monsters (ピエーロモンスター, Piēro Monsutā; Saban: Shadow Monsters)
Pierrot's personal army of monsters, which are created from black ink and can regenerate at a fast rate. He sends them to overwhelm the Pretty Cure before they acquire their Royale Mode forms and are able to easily defeat them.
Bad End Pretty Cure (バッドエンドプリキュア, Baddo Endo Purikyua; Saban: Glitter Shadow Force)
Voiced by: Misato Fukuen, Asami Tano, Hisako Kanemoto, Marina Inoue, Chinami Nishimura (Japanese); Laura Bailey, Colleen Ann Villard, Alex Cazares, Danielle Judovits, Kate Higgins (English)
Clones of the Pretty Cures, which Joker creates using the last Cure Decor and the Three Commanders' expunged darkness to keep the Pretty Cures from preventing Pierot's resurrection. They are dark reflections of the Cures who seek to prove their superiority to the originals. Each Bad End Cure separates her original from the others to engage in one-on-one death matches, only to be destroyed.

=== Supporting characters ===
==== Family members ====
Ikuyo Hoshizora (星空 育代, Hoshizora Ikuyo)
Voiced by: Mariko Kouda (Japanese); Cindy Robinson (English)
Miyuki's mother.
Hiroshi Hoshizora (星空 博司, Hoshizora Hiroshi)
Voiced by: Toshihiko Seki
Miyuki's father.
Tae Hoshizora (星空 タエ, Hoshizora Tae)
Voiced by: Yoshiko Matsuo
Miyuki's grandmother, who lives alone in the countryside. Her unfaltering optimism makes her incapable of falling into despair.
Daigo Hino (日野 大悟, Hino Daigo)
Voiced by: Masaki Terasoma
Akane's father. He runs an okonomiyaki shop called Okonomiyaki Akane, which he named after his daughter because it opened after her birth.
Masako Hino (日野 正子, Hino Masako)
Voiced by: Satsuki Yukino
Akane's mother. She doesn't help with her husband's business because she is unable to cook.
Genki Hino (日野 げんき, Hino Genki)
Voiced by: Ryoko Shiraishi
Akane's younger brother, who is a freshman at Nanairogaoka Public Middle School and a member of its basketball club.
Chiharu Kise (黄瀬 ちはる, Kise Chiharu)
Voiced by: Kyoko Hikami (Japanese); Debi Derryberry (English)
Yayoi's mother, who works as a fashion stage manager for Fairy Drop.
Yuichi Kise (黄瀬 勇一, Kise Yūichi)
Voiced by: Shuhei Sakaguchi
Yayoi's late father, who gave her her name.
Tomoko Midorikawa (緑川 とも子, Midorikawa Tomoko)
Voiced by: Rie Takahashi
Nao's mother.
Genji Midorikawa (緑川 源次, Midorikawa Genji)
Voiced by: Nobutoshi Canna
Nao's father.
Keita, Haru, Hina, Yuta & Kota Midorikawa (緑川 けいた、はる、ひな、ゆうた、こうた, Midorikawa Keita, Haru, Hina, Yūta, Kōta; Saban: Calvin, Harriet, Hannah, Hugo, & Cody)
Voiced by: Yuka Terasaki (Keita), Chinatsu Akasaki (Haru), Yukiyo Fujii (Hina), Ikumi Nakagami (Yuta), Ryōko Hikida (Kota), Marina Inoue (Yui) (Japanese); Robbie Daymond (Calvin & Hugo), Erin Fitzgerald (Harriet & Hannah), Stephanie Sheh (Cody) (English)
Nao's five younger siblings. Haru and Hina are girls, while the rest are boys.
Shizuko Aoki (青木 静子, Aoki Shizuko)
Voiced by: Emi Shinohara (Japanese); Michelle Ruff (English)
Reika's mother, who is an aikido expert.
Junnosuke Aoki (青木 淳之介, Aoki Junnosuke)
Voiced by: Kiyohito Yoshikai (Japanese); Robbie Daymond (English)
Reika's older brother, who is a judo protégé.
Soutarou Aoki (青木 曾太郎, Aoki Sōtarō)
Voiced by: Tomomichi Nishimura (Japanese); Patrick Seitz (English)
Reika's grandfather, who is a Japanese calligraphy expert.

=== Other characters ===
Namie Sasaki (佐々木 なみえ, Sasaki Namie; Saban: Miss Mason)
Voiced by: Ryoko Ono (Japanese); Mary Elizabeth McGlynn (English)
The homeroom teacher of class 2-2.
Brian Taylor (ブライアン・テイラー, Buraian Teirā)
Voiced by: Tetsuya Kakihara
A foreign exchange student from the United Kingdom, who Akane has a crush on.
Ms. Horike (堀毛先生, Horike-sensei)
Voiced by: Mika Kanda
A middle school teacher.
Fujiwara
Voiced by: Themselves
An owarai comedy duo who guest star as themselves in episode 17.
Officer Matsubara (松原巡査, Matsubara-junsa)
Voiced by: Shusaku Shirakawa (Japanese); Lucien Dodge (English)
A policeman who often meets Majorina as she loses her inventions, but she usually runs off without saying goodbye.

=== Minor characters ===
Irie (入江; Saban: Jared)
Voiced by: Tomoyuki Higuchi (Japanese); Lucien Dodge (English)
The president of Nanairogaoka Public Middle School's student council, who is very popular among female students for his handsome looks.
Runa Terada (寺田 るな, Terada Runa; Saban: Theresa)
Voiced by: Chinatsu Akasaki (Japanese); Melissa Fahn (English)
The clerk of Nanairogaoka Public Middle School's student council.

=== Movie characters ===
Characters who appear in the film Smile PreCure! The Movie: Big Mismatch in a Picture Book!

Nico (ニコ)
Voiced by: Megumi Hayashibara
A purple-haired girl who lives in a picture book that played a role in shaping Miyuki's outlook as a child. However, her story was incomplete since some of its pages were missing, and she holds a grudge against Miyuki for not finishing her story like she promised.
Demon King (魔王, Maō)
Voiced by: Masaki Terasoma
The main antagonist of the film, a purple bird-like dragon and the villain of Nico's story. He corrupted Nico to act on her grudge toward Miyuki. Still, after Nico discards her hatred toward her, he personally attacks the Pretty Cure before being purified by Ultra Cure Happy.
Momotaro (桃太郎, Momotarō)
Voiced by: Atsushi Abe
The hero of the story Momotarō.
One Inch Boy (一寸法師, Issun-bōshi)
Voiced by: Konami Yoshida
The hero of the fairy tale Issun-bōshi.
Sun Wukong (孫悟空, Son Gokū)
Voiced by: Yumiko Kobayashi
One of the protagonists of the story Journey to the West.
Cinderella (シンデレラ, Shinderera)
Voiced by: Yoko Hikasa
The protagonist of the folktale Cinderella.
Cow King (牛魔王, Gyū Maō)
Voiced by: Hiroki Yasumoto
Demon from Momotaro (桃太郎の鬼, Momotarō no Oni)
Voiced by: Shintarou Oohata
A demon who is an antagonist in Momotarō.
Demon from One Inch Boy (一寸法師の鬼, Issun-boushi no Oni)
Voiced by: Kenji Nomura
A demon who is an antagonist in Issun-bōshi.

== Media ==
=== Anime ===
The 48-episode Smile PreCure! anime aired on TV Asahi and other Japanese stations between February 5, 2012, and January 27, 2013, replacing Suite PreCure♪ in its previous timeslot. The opening theme is "Let's go! Smile PreCure!" (Let’s go!スマイルプリキュア！, Retsu gō! Sumairu Purikyua) by Aya Ikeda. The ending theme used in episodes 1-24 is "Yay! Yay! Yay!" (イェイ！イェイ！イェイ！, Yei! Yei! Yei!) by Hitomi Yoshida, and the ending theme for episodes 25-48 is "Mankai Smile!" (満開＊スマイル！, Mankai Sumairu!; "Full Bloom Smile!") also by Yoshida. All three songs are composed by Hideaki Takatori. A Blu-ray Box Set by Marvelous AQL and TC Entertainment was released on October 26, 2012, in the same fashion as Suite PreCure. Standard DVD releases were also issued.

Saban Brands under its SCG Characters unit, have licensed the series outside of Asia under the name Glitter Force, releasing it as a Netflix exclusive. This version consists of 40 episodes, with twenty episodes released on Netflix on December 18, 2015, and the other twenty released on August 26, 2016. The adaptation, which was dubbed into English by Studiopolis, features changes to character names, terminology, and music. Glitter Force also skipped eight episodes and the film from the original Japanese version. The opening theme is "Glitter Force", performed by Blush, who also perform various insert songs. Shirley Pelts wrote that "Netflix is investing heavily in legacy cartoons such as Popples and Glitter Force, which it considers to be important toy and entertainment brands." The show is currently licensed by Hasbro. London Live began airing the series in July 2017.

=== Films ===
The heroines appear in the Pretty Cure All Stars cross-over movie series, first appearing in the fourth entry, Pretty Cure All Stars New Stage: Friends of the Future, which was released in Japanese theatres on March 17, 2012, and on DVD on July 18, 2012.

A film based on the series, titled Smile Precure! the Movie: Big Mismatch in a Picture Book! (映画 スマイルプリキュア！ 絵本の中はみんなチグハグ！, Eiga Sumairu Purikyua!: Ehon no Naka wa Minna Chiguhagu!) was released in Japanese theaters on October 27, 2012. It debuted at the number-one spot in the Japanese Box Office and earned a total revenue of ¥193,000,000 (US$2.42 million), and was the highest grossing PreCure movie to date.

=== Soundtracks ===
The music in the anime is composed and arranged by Yasuharu Takanashi, who previously composed the other Pretty Cure series Fresh Pretty Cure!, HeartCatch PreCure! and Suite PreCure. The official soundtrack to the series is divided into two editions, "PreCure Sound Parade!!" and "PreCure Sound Rainbow!!". There are also three vocal albums as well: "Spread out! Smile World!!", "Hey, Everyone Smile!!" and the vocal best album along with the movie's official soundtrack. The background music in the Saban dub is composed by Noam Kaniel (Noam) (who worked on X-Men, Code Lyoko, W.I.T.C.H., Power Rangers, Digimon Fusion, Miraculous Ladybug, and Luna Petunia). The songs from the Saban version were performed by the girl group Blush.

=== Manga ===
A manga adaptation by Futago Kamikita began serialization in Kodansha's Nakayoshi magazine in March 2012 and ended in February 2013.

=== Merchandise ===
Merchandise of the anime were also issued during the series's initial run, including bags, watches, raincoats, etc. Several toys featuring the Cure's transformation devices and weapons were also released by Bandai during the series' airing. Some of the Cures were also released as part of Bandai's long running S.H. Figuarts line of collectors figures.

=== Video game ===
A video game titled Smile Precure! Let's Go! Märchen World (スマイルプリキュア! レッツゴー！メルヘンワールド, Sumairu PuriKyua! Rettsu Gō! Meruhenwārudo) was developed by Namco Bandai Games and released in Japan for the Nintendo 3DS on August 2, 2012. The game sees the Cures take on the roles of various fairy tales such as Snow White, The Tortoise and the Hare, Cinderella and Hansel and Gretel.

== Reception ==
The original Japanese version was well-received, placing regularly in Japan's weekly top ten anime shows broadcast.

Brad Stephenson of About.com describes the English adaptation as "a return to when anime was fun, and the priority of everyone involved was to make a super accessible series that as many people as possible could enjoy." He liked the variety of animation for the physical attacks, the energetic singing of Blush, and that "young English-speaking children can have the same experience as the Japanese audience did when they first saw it." He also found the Japanese references not to be a deterrent and would encourage kids to look into Japanese culture as with Sailor Moon.

Ella Anders of BSC Kids, who had also reviewed many other recent magical girl adaptations such as LoliRock and Miraculous Ladybug, thought the series was better than she expected, but disliked the amount of localization provided by the Saban dub, writing that the "With the world so interconnected as it is now the removal of cultural aspects was saddening. It would be a great chance to celebrate and focus on the Japanese culture."

Jacob Robinson of What's On Netflix critically panned the Glitter Force adaptation, prefacing his review by stating that he most certainly does not recommend the English dub, calling the script "overly cheesy, girly and downright criminal cliché". Robinson also stated that Smile Precure would have been much more bearable to watch in Japanese.

The Glitter Force dub was cited as an example in The Mary Sue article on the subs vs. dubs debate.

Emily Ashby of Common Sense Media argued that while the anime "doesn't dazzle," the strong female leads shine through. Ashby also argued that the series comes across as "feeling silly and superficial" and said that the show is a "mild assault on the visual and auditory senses" through the "glitter" transformations. She said the latter is unfortunate as it is a "decent story with strong, appealing female role models."

== Notes ==
Preceded by Suite PreCure	Smile PreCure! 2012-2013	Succeeded by DokiDoki! PreCure
