= Combo Niños =

French animated television series

- Left: Serio, right: Pilar, up: Azul, down: Paco
- Genre: Action
- Created by: Carlo de Boutiny; Caroline Pierce; Fabienne Gambrelle
- Directed by: Jean-Jacques Lasarte
- Composers: Alain Garcia; Noam Kaniel
- Country of origin: France
- No. of seasons: 1
- No. of episodes: 26

Production
- Executive producers: Stéphanie Kirchmayer; Jacqueline Tordjman; Marc Buhaj
- Producers: Bruno Bianchi; Christian Leblanc
- Running time: 22 minutes
- Production company: SIP Animation

Original release
- Network: Jetix (international); TF1 (France)
- Release: August 2008

Combo Niños is a French animated television series created by SIP Animation in collaboration with Jetix Europe and TF1, aimed towards the 6–10 years old audience. The series is about the adventures of 4 juvenile capoeira practitioners with the mission to protect the city of Nova Nizza from attack by mystical creatures from another dimension called "Divinos".

The Combo Niños have the ability to transform into mystical beings in anthropomorphic animal form by touching one of the totems that appear on the creatures. This form gives them unique skills that serve them in the battle against the Divinos and to perform special attacks called Big Blastico, used to return a Divino back to its own dimension.

== Setting ==
The series takes place in an environment similar to Latin American countries, but especially Peru, Brazil, Colombia, Venezuela and Mexico. This is evidenced by clothing, architecture, food, and names, as well as the use of the Capoeira style of fighting. In addition, some characters play a sport called Novanoc that parodies the ancient game of the Mayans, the pok-ta-pok.

== Characters ==
=== The children ===
The children are the Combo 4, each of them being 11 years old: Serio, Paco, Azul and Pilar.

- Serio: His totem is the Tigrillo. Serio is quiet, yet is quite charismatic. He likes poetry and art, but sometimes he does not like to admit it and does not boast of their abilities. He is funny and sassy, and he is secretly in love with Azul, but is afraid to declare his love. When he becomes the Tigrillo his skills are: speed, agility, and strength in his claws.
- Paco: His totem is the Toro. Paco is competitive and tough, although at times he shows great pride and likes to show off, especially in his favorite sport, Novanoc. Paco becomes somewhat shy and has very bad temper when annoyed by something, and is occasionally foolish but is a very nice person and a good friend. When he becomes the Bull, Toro, his abilities are superhuman strength, capable of demolishing a building and cause waves sound clash, besides being very big.
- Azul: Her totem is the Aguila. Azul is quiet and serious, likes fashion and is intuitive, but she becomes quite bossy. Azul has a device for the detection and location of the Divino call DivinoBerry and battles. As the most intelligent, she plans how to stop and catch the Divinos. Azul doesn't know Serio likes her but, over time, she falls for him too. She has a phobia of insects and snakes (in the cases of Insecto Gigante and Mama Conda respectively). When turned into the Eagle, she is able to fly, cause powerful gusts of wind, control birds and produce high pitched sonic sounds.
- Pilar: Her totem is the Iguana. Pilar is eccentric, cheerful, likes many strange things, including eating things like insects, seafood and even some plants, although her favorite food is frozen pistachio nuts and blackberries. Pilar is very different from the others, especially when dancing or playing instruments. Sometimes she becomes insecure. In addition to being innocent she is very easily distracted, even in battles, but still can occasionally have ideas that help in the battle, even if her plans seem somewhat crazy. When she becomes Iguana, her skills are elasticity in many parts of her body.

=== The Masters ===
The children are mentored in their activities by "The Masters".

- Master Grinto is the teacher of the Combo Niños in terms of capoeira and the fight against the Divinos. He was formerly a Combo boy himself; his totem is the Monkey. The children rely heavily on Grinto, especially in problems they have in their lives. He helps by encouraging them and showing them the right way, and usually always mentions the phrase "Don't you think? I think." He works as a librarian at the school where they study.
- Old Head is another combo Master of the children, and was formerly also a Combo and Grinto's teacher. His totem is Dragon Wing. Old Head is quite literally just a head, because while he coached Grinto in a battle against a Divino, he ended up going to the Divino's world, and as punishment for being a teacher, his body was completely converted into a stone head. Yet he retains his life and supports Grint in training the Combo Niños, although his character is somewhat rough and wants to impose the classical, or 'old-school' form of training. His real name is Bernie.

=== Villains ===
- Diadoro, the main antagonist of the series. He was previously the mayor of Nova Nizza, but because of his lust for power, he ended up losing in the last elections. He looks for ways to oust the Mayor and regain his title, so, with the help of his assistant Gomez, they look for portals where they can invoke the Divinos they need to oust the Mayor, but always ends up losing, because the Divinos often betray him and don't follow his orders.
- Gomez is a scientist who knows where to locate all the portals of the Divinos and how to invoke them for help as ordered by his boss, Diadoro. He's always inventing gadgets to summon the Divinos, and also to try to control them, at which he always ultimately fails. Even if he is little more than a slave to Diodorus, Gomez always supports him.

=== Divinos ===
The mystical creatures from another world that previously have been in the world of humans but caused chaos and disaster, until they were returned to their own world. Most of them seek conquest of the world of humans but are trapped in their world. Unfortunately, Diadoro's ambition has led them back to return to the world of humans, and although Diadoro wants them to follow his orders, they ignore him, though some are interested in helping him until it's time to break free and try again to conquer the world by themselves. The Divinos each display one of the four totem symbols on their body that, when touched by the child with the corresponding animal, allows them to transform into their Animal Forms.

- Duplico, an all-singing, all-dancing creature who speaks in autotune and can turn into anybody it touches. He has the Iguana totem.
- Frog Divino, a Divino from the Divino World who tries to kiss Azul when she accidentally gets trapped in their world.
- Insecto Gigante, a yellow creature who can control bugs and can be quite full of himself. He rides on a red bug that he enlarged using magic. He has the Aguila totem.
- Buffbullo, a buffalo Divino who eats up everything in sight. He deems himself as "Big and Bad". He has the Tigrillo totem.
- Calamar, a huge creature who is classified in the top 20 of the most dangerous Divinos. It has the Iguana totem.
- Perro Cerebro, a giant Dog Divino who acts just like a real-world dog. Gomez can translate his barking using a device. He has the Toro totem.
- Senor Sueno, a Divino who can make everyone relax with a sleep, but in reality, he makes anyone's nightmares become reality. He has the Toro totem.
- The Merry Merry Miriachis, a trio of Divinos who can make everyone constantly dance forever with their music. They feature all four totems.
- El Gaseoso, a green creature who intends to turn everyone into stinky stinkbombs. He has the Tigrillo totem.
- Baby Dragon, a young dragon Divino who the Combo Niños end up trying to look after when they find it.
  - Mother Dragon, the destructive six-armed mother of the Baby Dragon who deems Nova Nitza to be the perfect playground for her baby. She has the Toro totem.
- Kissy Kissy Love Love, a creature who can charm anyone with her cuteness, but in reality is stealing true love for herself. She can also turn into a large, destructive creature. She has the Iguana totem.
- Viva Selvasa, a dried up woman who deems herself as the "Queen of the Jungle", and can destroy greenery and plants. She has the power to disguise herself to make herself look more "pretty". Her sidekick is a frog named Reggie. She has the Toro totem.
- Sportivo, an athlete who deems himself to be "Undefeatable" in Novanoc, but in reality is a sore loser and can power himself up if so to cheat. He has the Toro totem.
- Super Agua Señor, a creature who can flood a town for all it's worth. He has the Toro totem.
- El Gecko
- Loro and Ave, two bird Divinos who are brothers named the "Bickering Birdateers" as they always argue and fight with each other. With their feathers, they can cause anyone to argue with one another and put the blame on each other. They have the Toro and Tigrillo totems.
- Gizmo, a two-faced inventor Divino who Gomez hires to build a robotic dinosaur, but decide to destroy Nova Nitza instead. They have the Tigrillo totem.
- The Combo Divino, a combination of Duplico, Insecto Gigante, and Buffbullo accidentally combined by the Combo Niños after touching Grinto's totem, the Monkey. It has the personality of all three Divinos.
- Mama Conda, a Snake Divino who plans to destroy Nova Nitza with her three children, who are as evil as she is and soon combine with her to form a singular monster with four heads. She has the Aguila totem, and is the only Divino that wasn't summoned by Diadoro and Gomez.
  - Baby Snake, The youngest snake of Mama Conda is the only one who has a heart and befriends Azul in order to let her return home.
- Mono, a Monkey Divino who can turn anyone into primates like himself, and is quite egotistical. He has the Toro totem.
- Zotz, a Zombie-like Divino who can turn anyone into zombie-like creatures. He has the Tigrillo totem.
- Elefanto, a pink Elephant Divino, although its personality isn't known. Its totem symbol isn't shown.
- Deceptiva, a young girl Divino who likes to lie and fool anyone unnerving to be-friend her, and has the power to transform into anything she wants. She has the Iguana totem.
- Chiquito, a blue human-shaped Divino who can turn any adult back into childhood, but preserving the immaturity they once had. He has the Iguana totem.
- Cambiador
- Lady Luck, a goddess who makes everyone believe they have good luck, but in reality gives them bad luck. She has the Tigrillo totem.
- Cerebrino, a Divino who seems to know a lot like how someone knows the information in a book, but he really steals people's brains. He has the Iguana totem.
- Avaricioso, a Divino who can make anyone rich, and can transform to make himself more attractive, but he actually steals everything demanding ransom. He has the Toro totem.
- Magnífico, a Divino who can make himself look handsome by merging the bodies of anybody he sees as such, such as Diadoro. He has the Toro totem.

=== Recurring Characters ===
- Miss Solidad is the teacher of the school where the Combo Children study. She is quiet, nice and likes to teach children, even using some games and having fun with them, but is limited by Director Bronka because he thinks she does not teach the children properly.
- Director Bronka is the director of the school. He is gruff and strict, insisting that the children are 'properly' educated, no matter what happens outside or how well teachers teach, especially with Miss Solidad.
- Mayor Ruelas is the Mayor of Nova Nizza and almost every time Diadoro is defeated she finds a way to discredit him further than he already is.
- Michael is a school boy and a fan of the Combo Niños, even without knowing that his classmates are the Combos.
- Millie is a school girl and Michael's greatest friend. She gets along very well with everyone and is cheerful.
- Ralph is a school boy and even though he's in a wheelchair he is an excellent player of Novanok, and also makes piñatas.
- Telmo is another companion of the Combo Niños. He is Paco's great rival and buddy of Pearl.
- Pearl is a school girl who is very rich. She believes she is the best and spends her days annoying everyone, especially Pilar, because she is jealous of her.

== Episodes ==
No.	Title	Written by	Storyboarded by	Divino(s)	Original release date
1	"Double Niños"	Michael Ryan	Laurent Bru & Daniel Dubuis	Duplico	August 2008
An all singing, all dancing Divino named Duplico causes trouble by turning into anyone he touches.
2	"Insecto Gigante"	Mark Hoffmeier	Daniel Dubuis & Laurent Bru	Insecto Gigante	August 2008
Azul has to deal with a Divino who can control all the bugs in town, which is her worst fear!
3	"Big Bad Buffbullo"	Chris Brown	Jordi Valbuena Hernandez & Laurent Salou	Buffbullo/Parasito	August 2008
A talent show is held in Nova Nitza which the kids attend. Serio thinks the only talent he has is to train a Divino - Buffbullo to be more specific.
4	"Masks"	Michael Ryan	Daniel Dubuis & Laurent Bru	Calamar; Perro Cerebro	August 2008
Diadoro and Gomez are bound to find out who the Combo Niños are, so with the help of a Dog Divino, they attempt to take them.
5	"Dream Divino"	Ernie Altbaker	Jordi Valbuena Hernandez	Senor Sueno	August 2008
Senor Sueno, the master of sleep is released and causes the Nova Nitza citizens to fall into a deep sleep themselves!
6	"Merry Merry Mariachis"	Mark Hoffmeier	Daniel Dubuis & Laurent Bru	The Merry Merry Miriachis	August 2008
A trio of music-playing Divinos cause everyone in town to dance non-stop to their endless music!
7	"El Gaseoso"	Michael Ryan	Jordi Valbuena Hernandez & Laurent Salou	El Gaseoso	August 2008
A very stinky Divino causes a huge stinkbomb in town, while Pilar solves the problem of green gelatin.
8	"Gah Gah Boom Boom"	Chris Brown	Jordi Valbuena Hernandez & Laurent Salou	Baby Dragon and its Mother	August 2008
The School's classroom takes a look at a baby Ocelot. As that is going on, a wild baby Dragon Divino wreaks havoc, threatening to destroy the dam. Its mother proves to be even worse, wanting to use Nova Nitza as a playground for her baby.
9	"Kissy Kissy Love Love"	Simon Jowett	Daniel Dubuis & Laurent Bru	Kissy Kissy Love Love	August 2008
A Divino named Kissy Kissy Love Love captivates everyone in Nova Nitza, but is really hiding a big secret behind it...
10	"Viva Selvasa"	Ernie Altbaker	Stéphane Annette	Selvasa	August 2008
Selvasa rules the plants in different areas, but is waiting to rule a city with its powers.
11	"Nizza Knights"	Mark Hoffmeier & Ernie Altbaker	Jordi Valbuena Hernandez & Daniel Dubuis	The Undefeatable Sportivo	August 2008
Diadoro releases an almost undefeatable Divino in order to win over his team.
12	"Super Agua Señor"	Ian Carney	Matthieu Cordier	Super Agua Senor	August 2008
Old Head takes hold of training when Grinto feels sick. Meanwhile, Diadoro and Gomez release a Divino who can help put the Nova Nitza Park back to them.
13	"El Gecko"	Art Young	Daniel Dubuis & Laurent Bru	El Gecko	August 2008
Diadoro releases a Divino who can vandalise an entire town after being infuriated by a campaign held by the Combo Niños to keep Nova Nitza tidy.
14	"Bickering Birdateers"	Simon Jowett	Franck Leguay & Roland Boschi & Nicolas Viegeolat	Loro and Ave	August 2008
Diadoro and Gomez release 2 bird Divinos who do nothing but argue with each other!
15	"The Fantastico Super Niños"	Ernie Altbaker	Jordi Valbuena Hernandez & Marc Crévisy	Gizmo	August 2008
Diadoro attempts to make a TV show based on the Combo Niños, only to release a robotic Divino for the recording.
16	"Attack of the Combo Divinos"	Mark Hoffmeier	Marc Crévisy & Franck Leguay	Duplico, Insecto Gigante and Buffbullo/Parasito; The Combo Divino (Combination of Duplico, Insecto Gigante and Buffbullo)	August 2008
The Niños accidentally sell the items where Duplico, Insecto Gigante and Buffbullo were placed in on Nizzabay to Gomez and Diadoro, who release them back to Nova Nitza through the help of a device created by Gomez. When the Niños accidentally touch Grinto's "Monkey" totem which ends up combining the 3 Divinos into a giant Divino with 3 heads, Master Grinto and Old Head are sent out to help the Niños with this situation.
17	"Mama Conda"	Agnès Bidaud & Pierre Monjamel	Laurent Bru & Mizuho Sato Zanovello	Mama Conda and her Children	August 2008
A mistake causes a huge snake Divino to be released to the world. Azul goes ahead to conquer her fear of snakes with an unlikely friend by her side...
18	"Monkey Madness"	Ian Carney	Jordi Valbuena Hernandez & Daniel Dubuis	Mono and his Monkey Army	August 2008
A Monkey Divino attempts to turn Nova Nitza into a town full of primates!
19	"Night of the Zotz"	Erika Stéhli	Jordi Valbuena Hernandez	Zotz	August 2008
The Divino Zotz wants to get what he wants - turning everyone into creatures like him!
20	"Into the Divino World"	Erika Stéhli	Laurent Bru & Mizuho Sato Zanovello	Elefanto; Deceptiva	August 2008
Pilar accidentally heads into the world where the Divinos live due to the lies spread by Deceptiva. The other Combo Niños must save her.
21	"Kid Grinto"	Art Young	Jordi Valbuena Hernandez & Marc Crévisy	Elefanto; Chiquito	August 2008
The wild kid Divino Chiquito, turns Mestre Grinto into a kid again, and not any old kid - a really wild one!
22	"The Ol'Switcheroo"	Chris Brown	Laurent Bru	Cambiador	August 2008
A pixie-like Divino threatens to switch Nova Nitza with the Divino World!
23	"The Luckiest Luck"	Erika Stéhli	Marc Crévisy & Franck Leguay	Lady Luck	August 2008
Serio loses a lucky charm, and he's up against a Divino of luck!
24	"The Divino Code"	Ian Carney	Jordi Valbuena Hernandez	Cerebrino	August 2008
Cerebrino, a very brainy Divino gets revenge on Grinto by challenging him to a game of intelligence.
25	"Paco Strikes it Rich"	Art Young	Jordi Valbuena Hernandez & Marc Crévisy	Avaricioso	August 2008
Avaricioso gets released by Diadoro and Gomez, allowing the latter to gain the fame he wants at becoming mayor of Nova Nitza.
26	"Divino Doro"	Simon Jowett	Laurent Bru & Mizuho Sato Zanovello	Magnífico	August 2008
The most handsome Divino, Magnífico takes control of Diadoro's body to make him look more handsome than before.

== Production ==
Combo Niños was produced by French animation studio SIP Animation, with animation work done by the Malaysian studio Inspidea.

The series was originally announced in October 2004, with delivery planned for the first quarter of 2006, and an expected budget of approximately US$370,000 per episode. At the time, the character of Diadoro was envisioned as a "down-on-his-luck e-trader".

== Broadcast ==
Besides Jetix in Europe and Latin America, the series has also been broadcast on several other networks.

- In Australia, since a Jetix Channel doesn't exist in the country, the show aired on free-to-air services Seven Network and 7TWO (which Disney had a partnership with Seven's parent company for many years).
- In France, the series aired on TF1 (on the TFOU block) before Disney XD (Jetix France rebranded months after the show's premiere on the channel), due to the fact they co-produced the show. The show would premiere on Disney XD in December 2009.
- In the United Kingdom, as well as Jetix, the series aired on the GMTV-owned (Which Disney held a 25% stake in at the time) Toonattik strand, which itself aired on ITV1 and CITV.
- In Turkey and Romania, the show aired on Kanal D.
- In the Middle East, the show aired on MBC 3, who aired other Jetix programming.

== Reception ==
The series has been appraised as part of a well-needed fresh wave of television programming at the time. The concept of introducing young viewers to capoeira via an animated medium has been viewed positively, though some aspects were criticized as not ideal.
