= In ze boîte =

- Presented by: Joan Faggianelli
- Country of origin: France

Production
- Producer: Candice Souillac et Jean-Luc Gabriel
- Running time: 29 mins
- Production company: Angel Productions

Original release
- Network: Gulli
- Release: October 29, 2007 – present

In ze boîte is a French game show broadcast since 29 October 2007 on the channel Gulli and presented by Joan Faggianelli.

It oppose two families, composed of an adult and of two children (who are not obligatorily brothers and sisters) and who come in confrontation between four rounds, two being pointed on the leisure, the two others on the general knowledge. At the end of the fourth round, the family having scored most of points must confront the redoubtable Dark Box (Boîte Noire in French).
