= Blush (Asian band) =

Hong Kong girl group

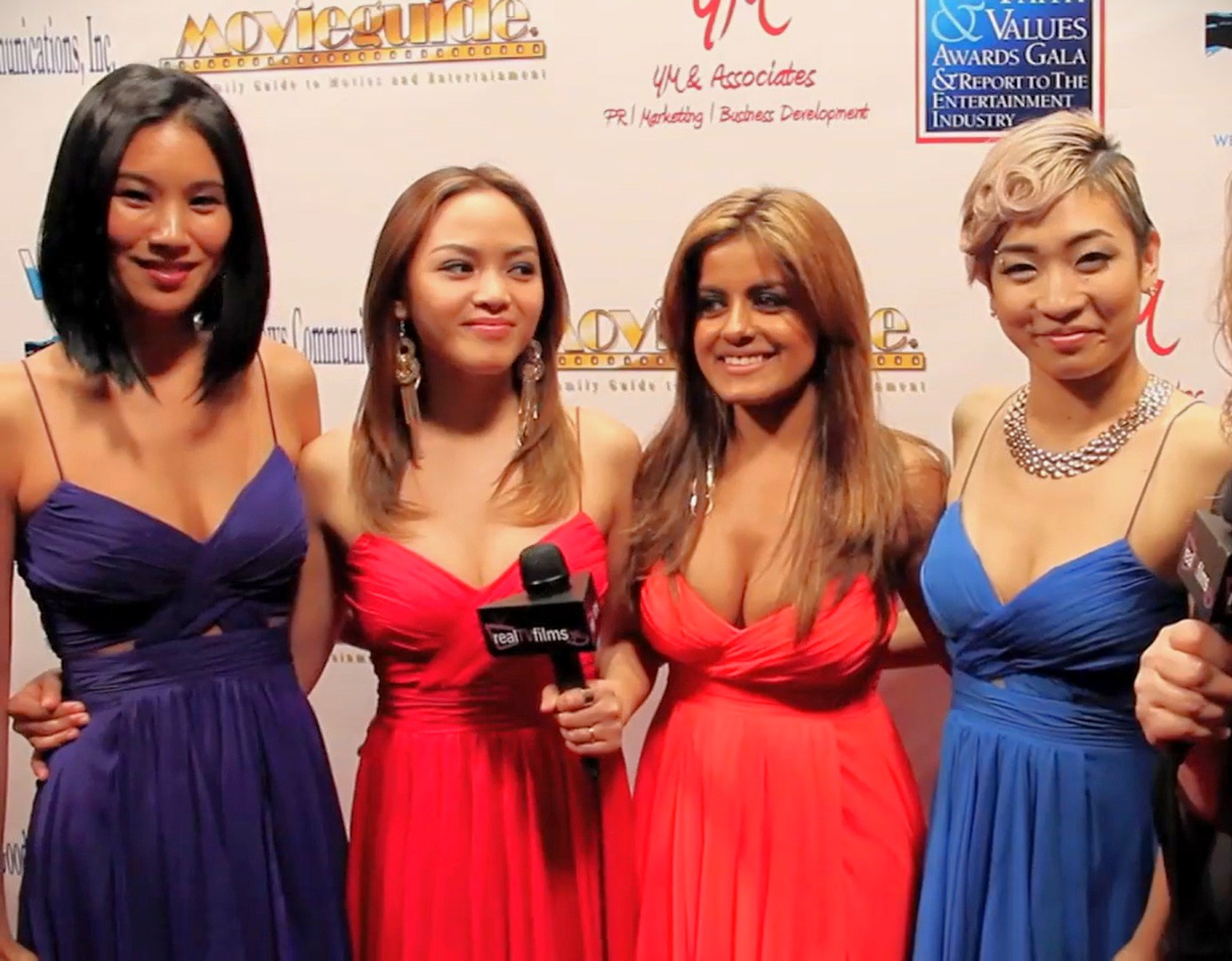
- Four of the members of Blush in 2014

Background information
- Origin: Hong Kong
- Genres: Dance-pop; electropop; bubblegum pop
- Years active: 2010–2017
- Label: FarWest Entertainment
- Past members: Angeli "Maya" Flores; Alisha "Ali B" Budhrani; Natsuko "Nacho" Danjo; Victoria "Queen V" Chan; Ji-hae Lee; Nikita Vecino

Blush was a Hong Kong–based Asian girl group originally composed of five members from the Philippines, India, China, Japan, and South Korea. They were formed by FarWest Entertainment in 2010 with the intent of popularizing an Asian vocal act in the United States as well as in all of Asia. They performed in English and the members resided in Los Angeles, California. A reality show called Project Lotus: The Search for Blush premiered on Channel V on March 8, 2012, showing the formation of the group.

== History ==
=== Formation ===
Blush was formed by FarWest Entertainment in 2010 with the intent of popularizing an Asian vocal act in the United States and Asia as well as the rest of the world. They were formed through a selection process called Project Lotus, who were tasked with finding "Asia's Spice Girls". Five representatives from South Korea were selected as judges and trainees who traveled to different parts of Asia including China, Japan and India. One of the judges was rock singer Yoon Do-hyun of the South Korean rock band YB.

=== 2010–2017 ===
In 2011 they opened and performed alongside many artists including B.o.B, Far*East Movement, Black Eyed Peas, Justin Bieber, Jessie J, and Diana Ross. On May 24, 2013, at the Singapore Social awards, produced by Starcount, Blush performed at a concert with other artists held at Gardens by the Bay in Singapore for four hours, which was attended by 8,000 people. They performed their singles "Warrior" and "All Stars" among others with mixed reception.

In 2015, Ji-hae left the group and was replaced by Nikita Vecino from the Philippines. The group went on to provide the theme song for Netflix animated series Glitter Force, which was Saban Brands English dub version of the anime Smile PreCure!. The song titled "Here We Go... Go! Go!" premiered along with the series on December 15. The group quietly disbanded sometime in 2017 after a long period of inactivity following their last performance in Hong Kong.

== Discography ==
=== Studio album ===
Title	Details
Make You Blush	Released: March 17, 2015; Label: FarWest Entertainment; Formats: Digital download, streaming

=== Extended plays ===
Title	Details
The Undivided EP	Released: May 10, 2012; Label: FarWest Entertainment; Formats: Digital download, streaming

=== Singles ===
Title	Year	Peak chart position		Album
Title	Year	US Kid	US Dance	Album
"Undivided" (featuring Snoop Dogg)	2011	—	3	The Undivided EP/ Make You Blush
"Dance On"	2011	—	1	The Undivided EP/ Make You Blush
"All Stars"	2012	—	14	The Undivided EP/ Make You Blush
"Up, Up and Away"	2012	3	—	Shake It Up: Live 2 Dance
"Miss Out"	2012	—	—	Make You Blush
"Electric"	2012	—	—	Make You Blush
"Warrior"	2013	—	—	The Undivided/ Make You Blush
"Doing it Better" (featuring Russell Cury)	2013	—	—	Make You Blush
"Ain't Nobody Got Time for That"	2014	—	—	Make You Blush
"Crzy Love" (featuring Sean Kingston)	2015	—	—	Non-album singles
"It's Crazy" (featuring Jay Sean)	2015	—	—	Non-album singles
"—" denotes releases that did not chart or were not released in that region.

== Awards and nominations ==
- "Best Asian Artist" at 2011 Young Guns Music Awards (31 January 2012)

== See also ==
- List of artists who reached number one on the US Dance chart
