= List of Gad Guard characters =

The following is a list of fictional characters from the anime show Gad Guard and their description. The characters were designed by Masahiro Aizawa based on Yoshitsune Izuna's original designs.

== Main characters ==
=== Hajiki Sanada ===
Voiced by: Kenichi Suzumura (Japanese); Tony Oliver (English)

- Age: 16

Hajiki is the main protagonist of Gad Guard and is a short-tempered and somewhat jaded boy. Being the eldest child and only son of the Sanada family, Hajiki works as a delivery boy in Unit Blue for Mr. Hachisuka of the Hachisuka Express. A bit of a degenerate and a punk initially, Hajiki skips school, races the cops on his skateboard or moped, and hangs out at all hours with his similarly punkish friends for lack of anything better to do. His mother was widowed when his father, an astronaut, died in a freak accident concerning the launching of a ship into outer space. Now the man of the house, Hajiki works himself to the bone, losing sleep and even putting himself in danger to help his mother and his sister Satsuki survive.

The main events in the series center on Hajiki's rivalry with Katana and the relationships he shares with the other Techode owners. After running into the justice-crazed Takumi, the friendly Aiko and the danger-prone Arashi, the group forms a friendship over the course of the series. Their relationships vary from episode to episode, as Hajiki sees Takumi as overly righteous, thinks Aiko's a little too obsessed with mutual friendship, and can't seem to understand what to do with Arashi. Still, he seems to hold all four of the others close, even Katana, and like Aiko, he wishes they were all on the same side.

'Hajiki' is Japanese slang for 'gun', an object that is by nature quick, forceful and erratic. A gun is also commonly considered the weapon opposite of a sword, which is by definition a sharp, precise and brutally personal weapon, qualities relatable to Katana.

==== Lightning ====
Lightning, named after his father's plane, is Hajiki's Techode that he receives in the first episode after coming into contact with a Gad he was delivering. Lightning is very quick and especially made for melee fighting and jumping through the use of the extendable exhaust tubes coming out of its neck. It also has engines in its lower legs, which can propel to great speeds when it gets down on one knee. Lightning is mostly red, white, and blue and resembles a sort of superhero.

=== Katana ===
Voiced by: Junichi Suwabe (Japanese); Dave Wittenberg (English)

- Age: 18

Katana (pronounced kah-ta-nah, as opposed to ka-tah-nah, like the sword) is the main anti-hero of the series who acts as antagonist to the main characters, though he constantly switches between villain and ally from situation to situation, depending on his ever-shifting mood. Appearing as a gothic mutation of a schoolboy in a striped shirt, sweater vest, tie, and slacks, all under a trench coat, Katana is tall and narrow in appearance, gaunt and deathly pale, with a scar beneath his left eye, and he is constantly carrying a gun. Katana works as a man-for-hire, living on the garage-level of an abandoned building on the edge of a junkyard in Night Town. Dark, cold and stoic by nature, Katana lives alone, having no friends and seemingly not wanting any. However, Katana develops a very strong and almost obsessive attachment to Saiyuri over the course of the story, her disappearance becoming the main motivation for his actions near the end of the series. Another person important to Katana is Radigue, who acted as Katana's father after his family died in a shipwreck and is most likely to be the originator of Katana's secret enjoyment of building machinery and digging up Heavy Metal parts. Personality-wise, he shows no interest in much of anything but money and rising to the top of the criminal ladder, his grand intention to rule over Night Town. While not evil, Katana is a sociopath.

Katana is a very proud Heavy Metal operator, having built his first one in the series, Seven, himself. However, early in the series, it is destroyed by Lightning and later replaced with Katana's Techode, Zero. Katana becomes very bitter about the loss of his original Heavy Metal, and although Zero is stronger his attachment to Seven never truly leaves him, and its destruction becomes the basis of his rivalry with Hajiki, a rivalry that eventually grows into a battle to show who is the bigger man. His need to prove that he is better grows into an insane obsession over the course of the story.

Along with Hajiki, Katana meets up with the other three Techode operators, and shows a variety of opinions about them. Aiko earns Katana's slight trust when she rescues Sayuri from a dangerous spot in the middle of one of his battles, who then brings him lunch daily. She seems to sit on neutral ground with him, to where Katana rescues her from being ganged up on in a bad part of town. Takumi, however, earned Katana's disdain almost to the level of that of Hajiki due to his meddling and loud mouthed sense of justice, and he delights in baiting and teasing him coldly only to prove that he is superior to the short-fused boy. Arashi stands as Katana's way of getting to Hajiki, using her as a messenger and even learning his name from her. They get into several fights, and he seems to despise her, to the point of near-blind rage in their final confrontation.

==== Zero ====
Although it is no replacement for Seven in his affections, Zero means a lot to Katana, to the point where it being damaged depresses him. Zero is symbolically the image of what Katana wishes to be, or at least what he would like others to perceive him as: something to fear. It resembles him to a slight degree, being tall, narrow and gangly, almost like a black skeleton and having glowing red eyes. Zero is the only Techode to come with an actual discharging weapon, a machine gun on its left arm. Katana has a habit of pushing Zero to its limits, as he does with himself, not recognizing damage until it is so severe the Techode kicks out and fails in tough spots, overcome with the strain.

=== Arashi Shinozuka ===
Voiced by: Fumiko Orikasa (Japanese); Kari Wahlgren (English)

- Age: 16

The daughter of a great martial-artist, Arashi (referred to as Shinozuka by Hajiki) left her home in Day Town to live on her own in Night Town, going to the same neighborhood catholic school as Hajiki and his friends. She ran away from home feeling she would never be good enough for her father, who expected before her birth to have a son, only to be disappointed with a daughter instead, and Arashi was given a boy's name because of that. As she came from a good part of town, Arashi has some trouble initially adjusting to life in the ghetto, such as her belongings getting stolen and not having batteries to cope with the power shutting off at midnight. She soon learns and tries to teach herself to fit in, doing everything from making friends with some boys at school to getting a job as a billboard repair worker to support herself. She is witness to the creation of Lightning, and after seeing Zero (belonging to Katana), Thunderbolt (Takumi), and Messerschmitt (Aiko), she longs for a Gad of her own, something she later finds by accident.

Arashi is Hajiki's love interest in the series, even though he all but ignores her through the first part of the series. Initially, she seems to annoy him, but Hajiki eventually grows accustomed to her even if her idealistic views don't always coincide with his. Arashi follows him relentlessly, seeming hellbent on staying with him to the point of following him to work and popping up in the middle of several of his Techode battles. In a few episodes when their views have clashed, Arashi has used her karate skills on Hajiki. By the end of the series, Arashi and Hajiki affirm their feelings for each other, much to the shock of the teachers who just walked in when they kissed for the first time.

Relationship-wise, besides Hajiki, Arashi has little contact with the other characters, save for Katana. She finds people like Katana disgusting because they do bad things, although she herself, like Takumi and Aiko, does not understand the troubles of living in a place like Night Town. Several times, she is held at gun-point by him, and threatened or told to pass a message to Hajiki, and at one point tries to fight him, only to have him beat her with little effort. Arashi opposes Katana and his obsession with besting Hajiki repeatedly, and continues to act as a problem to him through the entire series, though Katana sacrifices Zero to save her from death in the final episode, something she never gets the chance to ask him about. Aiko is portrayed to be a sort of friend to Arashi, but when the two of them are in the room with Hajiki, she seeks to vie for his attention, something Aiko doesn't notice. Takumi and Arashi have little to no friendship short of acquaintance.

==== Hayate ====
Hayate, named for the Japanese word referring to the winds, is modeled after Arashi's desire to fly, a symbol of her freedom, and thus she never uses it in battle, but only to rescue the others and herself from danger and perhaps to feel that she fits in with the other Techode owners. It is the only Techode with flight capabilities in the series, spinning its head and the wings attached to its neck like an enormous propeller. Other than this ability, Hayate has no special functions for fighting or violent conflict.

=== Takumi Kisaragi ===
- Voiced by: Yuko Sato (Japanese); Julie Ann Taylor (English)
- Age: 16

Takumi is a short and wealthy boy who lives in Day Town; his most defining attribute in the series is being almost obsessed with justice and the differences between right and wrong. When Takumi was young, his parents left him alone with a very large sum of money, more than he claims he could ever use and will never have to get a job. So because of his abundance of money and free time, using his Techode Thunderbolt, he goes out and attempts to solve crimes and punish evil-doers, because he wants to do something good, as he feels the local police force is very lacking. Takumi is also noted to have a very short temper and constantly takes out his anger on people, usually ending up in him getting into a wide variety of trouble.

Takumi's main adversary in the series is Katana who is essentially his polar opposite, using his Techode to commit crimes and not caring about others at all along with several polarities in appearance, personality and backstory. Takumi refers to Katana as evil and is more obsessed with Katana than Katana is with Hajiki. Repeatedly, Takumi claims Katana is a beast, raised in violence, and for that reason, violence is all he knows, saying that he cannot be made friends with, and he is not a real person at all. Despite all Takumi's loathing, Katana sees him only as a pest that he is doing nothing to provoke and on more than one occasion beats Takumi severely.

Later in the series it becomes apparent that Takumi's constant ranting about Katana being violent is actually Takumi casting his own control issues on Katana because it is easier for the "bad guy" to be the one with problems, as "heroes" are good and just and can never be wrong. It is Hajiki that tells Takumi he could never truly understand how complicated it is to live without money, as his parents left him enough so that he would never have to "waste his life" in a job. Unlike Hajiki, who works for a living, and Katana, who steals and is a mercenary for a living, Takumi is "too busy being high and mighty and righteous" to see that the world isn't black and white. Takumi later admits to himself that he does not know what he was discussing and knew nothing about the people he was fighting or who he was protecting.

Hajiki is on Takumi's side in the belief that Katana must be ceased when he is doing something wrong, but unlike Takumi, Hajiki does not believe that it is their job to cease every single evil, and for this reason they are not horribly close. Aiko, however, acts much as Sayuri does to Katana and insists to Takumi that they should all be friends, even suffering to handle his temper and bad attitude, only to smile and continue to talk with him. After losing Thunderbolt, Takumi grows close to Aiko and gets a job at Hajiki's mother's restaurant.

==== Thunderbolt ====
Thunderbolt, like Lightning and Zero, is crafted to fight, only made to be agile more than powerful. Thunderbolt is tall with long, thin limbs and a wide head. Thunderbolt also can shoot bolts of lightning from its hands and head, and for a short time grow large blades on its forearms. Thunderbolt fights like Takumi does, with fast, chaotic punches and with all the rage he has inside of him, which leads to Thunderbolt's destruction when it loses control and rabidly mauls Messerschmitt even while Takumi begged it to cease.

=== Aiko Mary Harmony ===
- Voiced by: Masayo Kurata (Japanese); Michelle Ruff (English)
- Age: 15

The adopted daughter of businessman Larry Harmony, the owner of Central Electronics – the biggest electric company in Unit Blue – Aiko is a sweet girl, but very conflicted. Being the only child of a rich and rather famous family, she is constantly under pressure to succeed her father when he steps down from the company, something she, at only fifteen, is not perfectly certain she wants to do.

Unlike the others, Aiko lives in Gold Town, the rich district of Unit Blue, and because she has every luxury, she is not spoiled, but she is very idealistic, carrying the belief that, because all five of the kids in Gad Guard were "given" Techodes, they all have something in common and therefore should all be friends. Unfortunately for Aiko, she is often met with disagreement from the others, but that hardly gets her down, as she dogs each one of them with the prospect again and again. If anything, the girl is determined, believing that there is good in every person, and that every person should be given a chance. For this reason, Aiko is the bridge between the other four, acting as friend to Arashi, reassurance to Hajiki and Takumi, and a peacemaker to Katana. The latter two are the ones she is most in touch with and have the greater impact on.

No one can really dislike Aiko. Because she saved Sayuri from being crushed by Zero in a battle, Katana holds her in slight trust, and so she tries to bring him into their sort of group by being friendly, visiting he and Sayuri in their hideout and bringing them lunches and snacks from time to time, to show her good faith and that she is concerned. She even invites Katana to a party at her father's mansion, something Takumi thinks is insane (because Katana is "evil"). Of course, he does not go, but it is the thought that counts. Takumi, however, she grows attached to after recognizing him – despite his lack of costume – as Thunderbolt's operator. From then on, she hangs around with him, forever the ray of sunshine in any situation, cooking for him, keeping him company when he falls into depression and forever working to cheer him up, no matter how bitter he acts. Even Jacque Bruno, who kidnaps Aiko to hold her hostage, can't help but like her for her determination and her friendliness (and the fact that she can eat his cooking).

==== Messerschmidt ====
Being raised the only child in a rich family, where her father is too busy for her and her mother is only on-camera four or five times in 26 episodes, Aiko is very lonely, and it is for this reason that her Techode, Messerschmidt, takes the form that it does. Aiko found Messa's Gad in a drawer in her father's expensive car garage, where she activated it, only to have it suck up everything inside of it to form her Techode. Messa is, in form, a titan, huge and imposing with a facial cast that looks like it has a beard, and a big thick body that is meant for protection. In essence, it is created in the image of a big brother—or even a father—for Aiko, someone she can depend on to protect her, and someone she can confide in, even if it can only listen. While Messerschmidt is not used in combat often, when it is, all it does is work to protect Aiko, which is what she wants: to be protected. It might be due to this that poor Messa is badly damaged by Thunderbolt when it goes haywire; it, like Hayate, was never meant to fight.

=== Sayuri ===
- Voiced by: Juri Ihata (Japanese); Therese Nguyen (English)

This adorable little blonde girl showed up out of the blue the day that Zero appeared, innocently asking Katana what he was going to call 'him'. For whatever reason, this child, armed with a pink coat, a bunny plushie and a big smile, refuses to leave, following the not-so-welcoming boy wherever he goes with the claim that she is his "friend". She seems to seek others who surround Katana, searching for more friends for him, asking Aiko and even Takumi if they are friends of his when she runs across them in the junkyard. She always seems to know more than she says, giving nothing but an innocent giggle when asked why she does not go home and where her parents are.

After having her around and being unable to damage her, no matter how she waddles around after him and pesters him, Katana becomes accustomed to her, and finally grows attached to her, to the point that she comes with him everywhere, even answering his job phone for him to take messages. She reminds him constantly that he likes Hajiki, and that they should be friends. He purposely saves her from harm, but why, he does not know initially? She is a Techode, created from the same Gad that Zero came from, from the part of Katana that remembers his childhood, and in particular, a childhood friend that was very dear to him. Sayuri is possibly the only person or creature Katana has ever truly and completely loved since the day he lost his memory, if only because she is the part of him that remembers, and the proof that he is, at heart, just a lonely little boy. Sayuri is very loyal to Katana, as she was created by him inadvertently. Like all the Techodes, she disappears when he no longer needs her, and learns to function on her own.

== Side characters ==
=== Haneke, Black and Richie ===
- Haneke: Voiced by: Eisuke Asakura (Japanese); Lex Lang (English)
- Black: Voiced by: Shintaro Ōhata (Japanese); Richard Cansino (English)
- Richie: Voiced by: Isshin Chiba (Japanese); Tony Williams (English)

These are Hajiki's friends. Haneke is a gamer and an intelligence type who seems quiet and broody, but also seems to know everything. He advises Hajiki to stay away from Katana, claiming he is from "another world", and that he could not handle him. Black is a blonde playboy who runs around in a trench coat with no shirt, hitting on and flirting with and sleeping with every girl he can find. He thinks he is a big hot-shot and is a pervert to boot. He hits on Arashi once and she beats the living crap out of him in front of their entire class. Richie is a sort of dumpy guy who's into jazz and the blues, and plays the trumpet, forever sending tapes to a recording company that is forever sending them back. These punks are Hajiki's posse, and hang around from time to time to keep him company, rag on him when he does not hang out with them enough and take up screentime, never learning he is a Techode pilot. By the end, Black drops out of school and becomes a dishwasher because he got a girl pregnant. Richie goes and joins a jazz band that goes to play in Unit Violet, and Haneke stays in school for lack of anything better to do.

=== Miss Linda ===
- Voiced by: Maki Yamaguchi (Japanese); Mari Devon (English)

The young lady teacher at Hajiki's school.

=== The Sister ===
- Voiced by: Akiko Takeguchi (Japanese); Wendee Lee (English)

Seemingly the head-master of the church school, Hajiki, Arashi, and the other poor kids go to. She has him writing reports a lot for falling asleep in class, and reports it to Kyoko, who kicks his ass for it. She is a nice old lady, but she does not take crap from anyone.

=== Mr. Hachisuka ===
- Voiced by: Unshō Ishizuka (Japanese); Kirk Thornton (English)

Hajiki's employer and sort of his stand-in father figure. Manager of Hachisuka Express, his motto is "we'll deliver anything", and by we, he means Hajiki, on a moped, at all hours, to wherever, as long as he gets paid. Hachisuka isn't a bad guy, but he has a weird sense of morals. Most of the time, his policy is to don't ask, don't tell. Slimeball money is as green as anybody else's and can be spent accordingly. He does nag Hajiki about going to school every now and again though, but he does not push it. He argues constantly with Catherine and can't seem to stand her, less when she is being nice to him. He smokes too much, lectures every once in a while, and will usually be there to bring Hajiki back down to earth and out of the I'm-a-hero clouds. He has some connection to Catherine from the past, but not much is said on the subject.

=== Catherine Flobér ===
- Voiced by: Kikuko Inoue (Japanese); Karen Strassman (English)

Catherine is one of the weirder female characters. Originally having hired Hachisuka Express to bring her a Gad, Wanda Woman impersonated her and got Hajiki to give it to her at her apartment while she was not home. For this reason, Catherine won't leave Hachisuka or Hajiki alone, because she lost her Gad thanks to them, and now she cannot use it because it is becoming Lightning. She is dead-set on getting a Gad of her own, which is never truly explained. All she said was that a Gad stole her real name, and she needed to get it back. For this, she has Hachisuka, Hajiki and his friends running around trying to find every Gad on the planet for her. She even tries to hire Katana. Catherine never gets a Gad, but sticks around to make a nuisance of herself, reminding Hachisuka that he owes her the money she paid him for the Gad's delivery, plus the "damages" in her losing it. In the end, she suggests she had liked to see him, and Hachisuka hightails it out of Night Town, closing his office. She chases him on a bicycle. She and Hachisuka were part of some organization in the past, before "the gad had stolen her name", but not much is said on this subject.

=== Kyoko Sanada ===
- Voiced by: Shōko Tsuda (Japanese); Barbara Goodson (English)

Kyoko is Hajiki's widowed mother. She works in a restaurant for all hours of the night to support her family. Kyoko is a big woman, and like most single mothers, she has no problem punishing her degenerate son for skipping school and falling asleep in class. She is a good woman though, constantly worrying about her children, especially Hajiki, and trying to do the best she can for them. She fusses about his eating, his school attendance and even yells at his employer when he disappears from hiding him and trying to pretend she is stupid. Late in the show, she takes Takumi on as an apprentice of sorts to teach him to cook, and in the process teaches him that all people, bad or good, should not be judged, but should be treated well.

=== Satsuki Sanada ===
- Voiced by: Tamaki Nakanishi (Japanese); Sherry Lynn (English)

Satsuki is Hajiki's younger sister. A dancer, Satsuki is convinced she will someday become a professional, if she gets a new leotard so she does not look shabby in front of the other girls. Both Hajiki and her mother give her money for this, because it is the one thing she likes to do, and they support her in that, even if they are poor. Satsuki is always worried about her brother and knows he is out getting himself in trouble, and has no problem shouting at him for being out too late and worrying about their poor mother. Katana takes her hostage to get to Hajiki.

=== Larry Harmony ===
- Voiced by: Kenji Nomura (Japanese); Michael McConnohie (English)

Aiko's father and the president of Central Electronics, the power company in Gold Town. His most important role in the story is when it becomes known that he has been collecting Gads and has quite a lot of them in a safe in his house. He was the buyer that had planned to buy the stolen Gads from Jacque and Wanda in the beginning, the ones that ended up going to Hajiki and Katana. Rich and always busy, Larry is not a bad guy, and he actually loves his daughter a lot. He just doesn't show it well until after she gets kidnapped. He is under the belief for a long time that his daughter goes out to spend time with her horse to talk to it about her problems instead of telling him, and that makes him feel like she does not trust him (she is actually out talking to her Techode). He has done business with Hachisuka and Catherine in the past, apparently in the Unit Cobalt before its destruction, but not much is said about this.

=== Jacque Bruno ===
- Voiced by: Masashi Ebara (Japanese); Jamieson Price (English)

The leader of a street gang bearing the name, Jacque, subverts the image of an intimidating mob boss, as he is characterized as a coward. He is crook and a thief but still somehow personable, running around dressed like a hick-pimp with an endless number of bent cigarettes, and is known for being sarcastic and bad-mouthed. He appears in the show a lot, usually accompanied by his girlfriend, Wanda Woman, or many inexpensive thugs. Later in the series, Jacque becomes a big plot key when an old photograph comes into his possession, one that Katana wants badly enough that he rips the roof off of Hajiki's house to get it back from him. His original base of operations is a strip club probably owned by his girlfriend.

=== Wanda Woman ===
- Voiced by: Yuriko Yamaguchi (Japanese); Wendee Lee (English)

Wanda is, as stated, Jacque's girlfriend, seen in the beginning of the series mostly wearing nothing but panties and a bra and rubbing herself on something or someone. She is not much but a hyper stripper, or so it seems, but she likes Gads, mostly because they are shiny and she can molest them. At some point, this gets her in serious trouble when she accidentally swallows a Gad in the shape of a jewel, only to have Jacque punch her in the stomach to make her cough it up...which activates it. Wanda becomes the first A-techode seen in the series, as Jacque's greed is transferred through the punch, but eventually the Gad burns out, and she is left alive, amazingly enough.

She tries to get Katana to sleep with her quite a few times, asking if he would like to have some "fun" with her, but each time he shuns her, saying he has better things to do. She does, however, use him against her none-too-smart boyfriend in the beginning by having him give a monotone "hey" into the phone while she is talking with him, then telling him she is busy and hanging up on him, to see if Jacque would get jealous. After Jacque disappears toward the end, Wanda tries a few hair-brained schemes with Katana's reluctant help, but after he ditches her, she fails out and ends up in jail.

=== Radigue ===
- Voiced by: Kenji Utsumi (Japanese); Peter Spellos (English)

After being orphaned as a child in a shipwreck, from which he was the only survivor, and losing his memory, Katana wandered aimlessly around Unit Gray until he was found and collected by a man named Radigue. A 'digger' by trade, Radigue excavated Heavy Metal parts and materials to sell them to mechanics and shops that would fence them to others. Radigue raised Katana, taking him around with him as he moved from site to site, only to have him disappear on him one day when he finished the Seven and went.

Radigue is not a nice man by appearance. In fact, he is very distrusting, as his work is competitive, and has his base of operations booby trapped with bombs and other deadly things, all set on trip wires. Only Katana has the knowledge of what his traps are, how to avoid them, and how to disarm them. He calls his unofficially adopted son a brat and a punk and shoves him around, which shows where Katana got his nasty nature... or maybe Radigue developed it to handle him. He does very much love the boy, and while Katana never truly says it out loud, he sees the man as a father-figure, even resenting him for treating him like a child and speaking of his quirks to others (such as an eye-twitch he has that signifies his being happy, being that he never smiles). Still, he loves Radigue too, as the digger's untimely death sends him on a blind killing-spree, in which he wipes out those responsible.

One of the few sentimental objects Katana owns is a brass trumpet, which was made for him by Radigue, with the memory that Katana had, as a boy, seen a man with a trumpet and said that he wanted one too. It was retrieving this trumpet as a surprise to him that unfortunately put Radigue in a place to be killed, but he went out swinging. Katana kept the trumpet to remember him by, and taught himself to play it.
