= Oh! Edo Rocket =

Japanese media franchise

- Cover of the novel

大江戸ロケット (Ō Edo Roketto)
- Genre: Alternate history; Science fiction; Surreal comedy
- Novel
- Written by: Kazuki Nakashima
- Published by: Ronsosha
- Published: August 7, 2001
- Manga
- Written by: Kazuki Nakashima
- Illustrated by: Una Hamana
- Published by: Kodansha
- Imprint: Afternoon KC
- Magazine: Monthly Afternoon
- Original run: February 25, 2007 – July 25, 2009
- Volumes: 3
- Anime television series
- Directed by: Seiji Mizushima
- Written by: Shō Aikawa
- Music by: Yusuke Honma
- Studio: Madhouse
- Licensed by: NA: Crunchyroll
- Original network: TV Saitama, Tokyo MX, Chiba TV, RKB, HBC, TV Aichi, MBS
- English network: US: Funimation Channel
- Original run: April 4, 2007 – September 26, 2007
- Episodes: 26
- icon

Oh! Edo Rocket (Japanese: 大江戸ロケット, Hepburn: Ō Edo Roketto; lit. 'Big Edo Rocket') is a 2001 stage play written for the Gekidan Shinkansen theater troupe by Kazuki Nakashima and directed by Hidenori Inōe, with a novelization released in August of that same year. The story follows a fireworks maker in medieval Edo as he tries to build a rocket to carry an alien back to her people on the Moon.

A manga adaptation illustrated by Una Hamana was serialized in Kodansha's seinen manga magazine Monthly Afternoon from February 2007 to July 2009, with its chapters collected in three tankōbon volumes.

A 26-episode anime television series by Madhouse was broadcast from April to September 2007. The anime series was licensed in North America by Funimation.

== Plot ==
The story is set in Edo in 1842, the thirteenth year of the Tenpō era. Government reforms have banned all luxuries, including plays, performances, inventions, and fireworks. Despite the political climate, Seikichi, a young fireworks maker, dreams of making a huge firework the likes of which have never been seen. But every time he fires a test rocket, he finds himself pursued by government officials.

One night, a blue monster and a white monster are fighting in the woods, battling each other and battling a group of human warriors. The blue monster gains the upper hand but is distracted by Seikichi's rocket, which allows the white monster to escape. The next day a mysterious girl appears before Seikichi and asks him to make a firework that will reach the Moon.

Throughout the series, the characters use terms and items that have not been created yet, including a pocket calculator and television sets. The TVs are primarily used as flashback devices to bring characters up to date on events they missed. Additionally, backgrounds in the series show shops with signs advertising electronics, specifically TVs and DVDs. In episode 12, Onui and Shunpei repeatedly pass back and forth between 1842 Edo and a modern Japanese railway station, even riding the train in one scene, without taking any notice of the change. There are other times when the characters acknowledge the fact that they are in an anime and comment on anachronistic language used.

== Characters ==
=== Residents of Furai Row-House Block ===
Seikichi Tamaya (玉屋 清吉, Tamaya Seikichi)
Voiced by: Yōko Sōmi (Japanese); Greg Ayres (English)
A pyrotechnician who dreams of making gigantic fireworks no one has ever seen or launched before, Seikichi is very hot-tempered and will get flustered easily. He was home schooled by his parents, who were most likely pyrotechnicians too.
Sora (ソラ)
Voiced by: Chika Fujimura (Japanese); Brina Palencia (English)
A strange but beautiful girl who appears unexpectedly in Seikichi's home, Sora asks Seikichi to make a rocket that will reach the Moon. She is also the white sky beast, a fact which she keeps from all but a select few of her new friends. Unlike the blue sky beast, Sora can speak to humans while in her true form. She does this several times when alone with Ginjiro.
Shunpei (俊平)
Voiced by: Rie Kugimiya (Japanese); Cherami Leigh (English)
A mathematical genius and Seikichi's younger brother, Shunpei, is much like his brother in personality, but was not home schooled like him. Despite the time period, he often uses a calculator to solve his problems.
Ginjiro (銀次郎, Ginjirō)
Voiced by: Kouichi Yamadera (Japanese); Jonathan Brooks (English)
A locksmith who can break any lock with his fingers, Ginjiro is also Captain of the Men in Black, code-named "Captain Bellybutton", but prefers not to be called that.
Santa (三太)
Voiced by: Kiyonobu Suzuki (Japanese); Charlie Campbell (English)
The carpenter of the row house, Santa is usually seen with Rokubei and Shinza.
Rokubei (六兵衛, Rokubee)
Voiced by: Shinya Fukumatsu (Japanese); Sonny Strait (English)
The tile mason of the row house, Rokubei is known for his grumpy and violent attitude, as well as for his enormous teeth that take up half his face. Usually seen with Santa and Shinza.
Rokubei's Wife (六兵衛の妻, Rokubee no Tsuma)
Voiced by: Chie Satō (Japanese); Laurie Steele (English)
The wife of Rokubei, yet her name is never mentioned. She constantly smacks her husband to shut him up and apologizes for his actions.
Shinza (新佐)
Voiced by: Kinoko Yamada (Japanese); Sean Michael Teague (English)
The engineer of the row house who frequents Akihabara. Usually seen with Santa and Rokubei.
Tenho (天鳳, Tenhō)
Voiced by: Risa Hayamizu (Japanese); Leah Clark (English)
Tenho is a circus performer who specializes in sleight-of-hand.
Tenten (天天)
Voiced by: Masaki Terasoma (Japanese); J. Michael Tatum (English)
Tenho's exceedingly tall brother, Tenten assists Tenho as a circus performer as well.
Genzo (源蔵, Genzō)
Voiced by: Katsuyuki Konishi (Japanese); Chris Cason (English)
The unnoticeable cross-dressing scale-maker, Genzo is extremely depressed by the fact that nobody except his mother and Onui recognizes him. He is also a mathematical genius, shown providing solutions to problems posted publicly by Shunpei. Later in the series, he is turned into a dove by one of the old man's contraptions.
Genzo's Mother (源蔵 ママ, Genzo Mama)
Voiced by: Yūko Satō (Japanese); Melinda Wood Allen (English)
An upbeat, cheery middle-aged woman who constantly tries to cheer up her son.
Onui (おぬい)
Voiced by: Kei Shindou (Japanese); Tia Ballard (English)
The town-belle watchdog for public morality at the row house, Onui acts like a puppy, often sniffing people. She also styles her hair so it looks like the tips of a dog's tail and wears hairpins which resemble large eyes. In Episode 12, she is revealed to be Shunpei's childhood pet he used to play with, but she left him because he wanted to solve a complicated math problem.
The Old Man (ご隠居, Goinkyo)
Voiced by: Rokuro Naya (Japanese); Steve Powell (English)
A mysterious fellow, known as the landlord of the row house. He is always surrounded by a coterie of young women, and has many strange inventions inside his home. At one point, the row house is heavily damaged by a gigantic wood-and-ceramic mecha, and the old man repairs it by pulling a lever on his wheelchair, which causes the damaged buildings to retract into the ground and be replaced by new, undamaged ones. In Episode 10, he is identified as a historical figure named Gennai Hiraga.

=== Outside the Row-House ===
Oise (お伊勢)
Voiced by: Romi Park (Japanese); Stephanie Young (English)
Wealthy owner of the Shirahama-ya pawn shop, and an old friend of Ginjiro from Osaka.
Oriku (おりく)
Voiced by: Arisa Ogasawara (Japanese); Trina Nishimura (English)
Daughter of the owner of the Kagiya fireworks shop, and a childhood friend of Seikichi.
Tetsuju the Human Fuse (火縄の鉄十, Hinawa no Tetsujū)
Voiced by: Jun Hashimoto (Japanese); Vic Mignogna (English)
A crazy rocketeer who lives deep inside the Chichibu mountains with tanukis as friends, Tetsuju thinks he can speak the moon people language (which is gibberish) and Sora usually responds to him.
Blue Girl (青い女, Aoi Onna) / Blue Sky Beast (青い獣, Aoi Kemono)
Voiced by: Tomo Sakurai (Japanese); Colleen Clinkenbeard (English)
A pale, slim, white-haired woman who wears a dark-blue kimono. She is also the Blue Sky Beast. She has to consume the vital fluids of higher beings, i.e., drink the blood of humans. She cozies up to Akai, persuading him to find and kill people for her to feed on. After a conversation with Genzo's mother, she realizes she does not know her name, or even whether or not she has one. Shortly before her death, Akai gives her the name Yu.

=== The Government ===
Akai Nishinosuke (赤井 西之介, Nishinosuke Akai)
Voiced by: Tokuyoshi Kawashima (Japanese); Chuck Huber (English)
A low-ranking policeman under the South Edo Magistrate who hates the residents of the row house, Akai has an obsessive compulsive disorder and feels the need to clean up dirt and trash from the street.
The Men in Black

Eyes (眼, Me)
Voiced by: Tomohisa Asō (Japanese); J. Paul Slavens (English)
Ears (耳, Mimi)
Voiced by: Yuji Ueda (Japanese); Anthony Bowling (English)
Arms (腕, Ude)
Voiced by: Eisuke Asakura (Japanese); Jeremy Inman (English)
Knees (膝, Hiza)
Voiced by: Katsuyuki Konishi (Japanese); Justin Cook (English)
Ankles (踝, Kurubushi)
Voiced by: Naoya Nakanishi (Japanese); Mike McFarland (English)
Heels (踵, Kakato)
Voiced by: Gô Shinomiya (Japanese); Newton Pittman (English)

Secret agents under the South Edo Magistrate, they tend to constantly move in odd ways such as scuttling like insects or cartwheeling. Their code names are taken from the body parts in which their powers are concentrated.
Yozo Torii (鳥居 耀蔵, Torii Yōzō)
Voiced by: Norio Wakamoto (Japanese); R Bruce Elliott (English)
Yozo is the South Edo Magistrate who dubbed Ginjiro the captain of the Men in Black. He is based on a historical figure.
Kinshiro Toyama (遠山 金四郎, Tōyama Kinshirō)
Voiced by: Toru Ohkawa (Japanese); Ian Sinclair (English)
The North Edo Magistrate who hired Tenho and Tenten to spy on the old man due to suspicion, and he also hangs out in town in disguise as Kin the Playboy. He is based on a historical figure.
Mizuno Tadakuni (水野 忠邦, Tadakuni Mizuno)
Voiced by: Masaki Terasoma (Japanese); Bucky Pearl (English)
The Senior Councilor of the Shogun Government, the man who banned fireworks and all forms of entertainment in town. He is based on a historical figure.

== Media ==
=== Stage play ===
The original stage play by the Gekidan Shinkansen theatrical troupe, directed by Hidenori Inōe and written by Kazuki Nakashima, was performed at the Osaka Shochikuza theatre from August 7–26, 2001, and at the Aoyama Theatre from September 5–24 of the same year. A novelization of the stage play was published by Ronsosha on August 7, 2001.

=== Manga ===
A manga adaptation illustrated by Una Hamana was serialized in Kodansha's seinen manga magazine Monthly Afternoon from February 25, 2007, to July 25, 2009. Kodansha collected its chapters in three tankōbon volumes, released from October 23, 2007, to October 23, 2009.

=== Anime ===
A twenty-six episode anime television series was animated by Madhouse. The series was directed by Seiji Mizushima, screenwritten by Shō Aikawa, with character designs by Takahiro Yoshimatsu and music composed by Yusuke Honma. The series was broadcast on TV Saitama, Tokyo MX, Chiba TV, RKB, HBC, TV Aichi and MBS from April 4 to September 26, 2007. The opening theme song is "Oh Edo Nagareboshi IV", performed by Puffy, which was also used as the ending theme for episodes 1 and 26. The ending themes are "100 miles: Niji o Oikakete" (100miles～虹を追いかけて; lit. '100 Miles: Chasing the Rainbow') by Santara (episodes 2–14) and "I Got Rhythm" by Natural High (episodes 15–25).

The series was licensed in North America by Funimation in 2008. The series debuted on Funimation Channel on November 15, 2010. Crunchyroll added the series to their catalogue in November 2017.

==== Episodes ====
No.	Title	Original release date
1	"Bright Red Fireworks Bloom in the Great City of Edo" "Ōedo ni Saku Kurenai Hanabi" (大江戸に咲く紅い花火)	April 4, 2007
In the midst of a battle, a blue sky beast is seized while a white sky beast manages to escape. Akai Nishinosuke warrants an arrest on Shinza for illegally building a fun-house. Though Seikichi Tamaya is accused of launching fireworks the previous night, Ginjiro deceives Akai by showing that Seikichi was just carrying his tools. While returning to his room, Seikichi meets Sora, who is fascinated with his display of fireworks. She requests that he must build a firework cannon that could reach to the Moon.
2	"The Man Was Waiting" "Otoko wa Matte ita" (男は待っていた)	April 11, 2007
Sora decides to stay until Seikichi builds the firework cannon, with Ginjiro being a killjoy. Sora quickly leaves after a lovesick Shunpei and a watchdog Onui causes more dismay for Seikichi. Ginjiro finds Oise, who faults him for having her fake an abacus dance for the upcoming river festival. Ginjiro later witnesses the white sky beast being attacked by a group of unknown armored men. Seikichi, after seeing Sora using strontium carbonate powder to enhance the coloring of a firework during a demonstration, is finally convinced in helping her build the firework cannon.
3	"A Silver Fox Bound by Fate" "En ni Shibarareta Gin no Kitsune" (縁に縛られた銀ノ狐)	April 18, 2007
The residents find Sora in Ginjiro's room, much to Seikichi's jealousy. Akai later ambushes Ginjiro in a nearby forest with the help of the group of armored men, known as the Men in Black. However, this was a test of combat skills orchestrated by Yozo Torii, who reveals that Ginjiro is destined through lineage to become the leader of the Men in Black. It is said that two meteors harboring the two sky beasts had landed in the forest, though the white sky beast is still on the loose. Ginjiro is reminded of the story of the Silver Fox and the Night Flower, who were once recruited by Heihachiro Oshio to raid and inflame various storehouses that have caused poverty, however Oshio had committed suicide out of cowardice.
4	"No Need to Get Excited" "Dokidoki Muyō" (ドキドキ無用)	April 25, 2007
The blue sky beast, revealed to still be alive, attacks Ginjiro, but the white sky beast saves Ginjiro from being injured. Akai is distraught upon learning that he is now to follow Ginjiro's orders. Seikichi displays an innovative firework cannon that could fly to the Moon. It is decided that the firework cannon will be launched inside the row house on the day of the festival. Sora goes inside the firework cannon when it is lit, urging Seikichi and Ginjiro to pull her out before the firework cannon launches. Seikichi is saddened that Sora could have left without saying her farewell.
5	"The Argument" "Ron" (論)	May 2, 2007
Ginjiro advises Seikichi to travel alone with Sora to test out more fireworks, but also to settle their differences. There they meet Tetsuju the Human Fuse, who views Sora as Princess Moonbeam, much to Seikichi's chagrin. The myth behind Princess Moonbeam is explained. Tetsuju believes that he will construct a firework cannon better and sooner than Seikichi. After stumbling upon Tetsuju's cabin of firework cannons, Seikichi realizes how determined he must be to build a firework cannon, all when Tetsuju launches his own into the sky.
6	"Duel to the First Love" "Kettō Dai Hatsukoi" (決闘大初恋)	May 9, 2007
Seikichi tests out a new model of a firework cannon with positive results. Akai is scared out of his wits when he briefly encounters the now two-headed blue sky beast. Oriku arrives in the row house, only to disagree with Seikichi's ambition to build a firework cannon. Seikichi later unveils to Sora that he used to stay with Oriku's family who owns a famous fireworks shop. Sora later explains to Oriku that Seikichi left her family on behalf of his ambition. As the blue sky beast makes another appearance, Oriku causes an explosion from her family shop.
7	"That Crazy Girl Just Flew!" "Tondemo nai Tonda Onna" (トンデモない飛んだ女)	May 16, 2007
Shinza discreetly meets with an unknown engineer at a temple, showing him a newly invented umbrella. When they part ways, one of them was attacked and declared dead. After the residents realize that Shinza was still alive, Ginjiro goes out on a hunch. A panicked Shinza activates his giant robot machine, mistakenly terrorizing the row house. Sora climbs onto the machine and dismantles it, rescuing Shinza in the process. Seikichi later finds Sora in the forest, hearing that she believes to be thought of as a monster. He brings her back to the row house to prove that the residents admire her presence. The old man, who restores the damaged row house, refers to the firework cannon now as the rocket.
8	"Love, Murder...He Does It All!" "Koi mo Koroshi mo Yaru tte sa" (恋も殺しもやるってさ)	May 23, 2007
Akai kills a mother in the streets at night, collecting blood for the mysterious blue girl to drink, as a token for her to stay with him. Seikichi tries to tell Sora to keep her ability to fly a secret. The blue girl, recognized as the blue sky beast, secretes a replica of herself, before finding and pursuing the white sky beast. Ginjiro suspiciously finds Sora in the streets, soon finding out that the white sky beast is actually her. When the blue girl catches up, Ginjiro orders the Men in Black to subdue her, allowing Sora to escape. Akai proposes that the blue girl should stay with him, instead of returning to the moon. After Sora show a nozzle fragment found in the meteor, though unbeknownst to the residents, Seikichi has an idea of how the rocket would be constructed.
9	"Betting on Love" "Ren'ai de Shōbu" (恋愛で勝負)	May 30, 2007
Sora wants Ginjiro to put the blue girl behind bars to prevent anymore murders of females in the streets. When Seikichi and Oise see Sora and Ginjiro at the riverbank, they assume that these two are dating. During a test launch, the nozzle of the rocket is able to maximize the thrust velocity, but the wooden barrel explodes due to the internal pressure of the nozzle. After Shunpei figures out that the barrel must be made of iron, it is learned that tickets will be sold in an underground lottery for the launch. As both Ginjiro and Akai find out who was responsible for distributing the tickets, the old man sends out a group of cats to gather the tickets to be burned. A clock tower bell is used for another test launch, but it starts ringing due to the internal pressure.
10	"Madhousecatincarnations" "Kaii Neko Henge" (怪異猫変化)	June 6, 2007
Kinshiro Toyama sends Tenho and Tenten to follow the old man in the streets, in order to investigate his real identity. Tadakuni Mizuno soon orders Torii and Toyama not to approach the old man, not knowing they have already done so. Tenho and Tenten arrive at the old man's home, finding many occult relics and items in a chamber. When Ginjiro finds them from outside, the two hide inside the chamber, only to be turned into cats. It is also found out that Seikichi and Sora have previously turned into cats as well. The old man returns and zaps the four back to their original forms. Toyama also arrives to clarify the reason behind his orders. Though Tenho and Tenten had intended to protect Seikichi and Sora, they are asked to leave the row house, however they first enjoy a cookout planned by the residents.
11	"Poppycock!" "Rachi mo nee" (埒もねえ)	June 13, 2007
It is explained how Genzo had turned into a dove, in that he also had previously entered the chamber. Seikichi is upset that Sora stayed out all night with Ginjiro, afraid she might be found out. Tetsuju chases Genzo into the row house, using a self-propelled fire boat, catching the eyes of the residents. It is revealed that Tenho and Tenten are lurking inside Ginjiro's room. Akai spies on Ginjiro, who takes Tenho and Tenten with him to see Toyama. Ginjiro tells Toyama that he is working for Torii at his own will, not due by force. Meanwhile, as Seikichi tests out his own fire boat, a selfish Tetsuju challenges him to a race. When an angry Oriku soon joins them, she blows up the fire boat, causing Seikichi to drown. Sora then reluctantly dives in to save him.
12	"If You Don't Like Worrying..." "Moshimo Nayamu no ga Iya Dattara" (もしも悩むのが嫌だったら)	June 20, 2007
Onui is concerned for Shunpei having to worry about his mistakes in his calculations. The old man tells the story about Naje-Naje, a curious boy who, after pestering the villagers with questions, sets on a dangerous journey to seek the answer to the ultimate question, though the old man leaves it as a cliffhanger. Shunpei goes out with Onui to ask various residents about his stress, but to no avail. The next day, the two talk to Toyama, Oise and Oriku, yet they were no help either. Shunpei reminisces of when he used to play with a dog as a child. He wished to be able to run away with her when his parents were fighting, but needed to stay because he wanted to solve a complicated math problem. It is implied that Onui was the dog from Shunpei's childhood.
13	"Whaddaya Think of These Guys?" "Anta Koitsura Dō Omou" (あんたこいつらどう思う)	June 27, 2007
It is still apparent that only Ginjiro and Akai respectively know the true identities of Sora and the blue girl. The Men in Black devise a plan to enter the row house to get to Ginjiro, seeing if he has a connection to the white sky beast. Ginjiro does his best to prevent them from causing any trouble. All the residents then start a ruckus in the row house, possibly started by Rokubei's wife. Seikichi, having ended the ruckus, concludes that the base of the rocket should have four nozzles. The blue girl, in her true form, attempts to steal the rocket, but Seikichi manages to blast it up into the sky in time.
14	"Just to Let You Know: I Caught a Glimpse of Tomorrow" "Ippitsu Keijō Asu ga Mieta" (一筆啓上明日が見えた)	July 4, 2007
Oise visits the row house to collect the debts of the residents, nonetheless they fail to pay up. After taking an interest in his calculations, the blue girl speaks with Genzo's mother, curious to know where Genzo is. Oise feels guilty for buying a lot of gunpowder, since she is unable to pay off a loan. Akai and Torii ask Oriku to rebuild a sky vessel from the fragments stored inside a shed. The blue girl snatches some money from Oise, offering it to Genzo's mother. However, she turns down the offer, and the blue girl later realizes that she is nameless.
15	"Out of Nowhere! Air Raid at New Year's" "Totsuzen! Shōgatsu ni Daikūbaku" (突然!正月に大空爆)	July 11, 2007
Ginjiro tries to confirm that the white sky beast is the one trying to stop the blue sky beast from roaming the streets. Santa, Rokubei and Shinza showcase an inventive helicopter contraption, but it fails to function. Shunpei concocts a method for Seikichi to launch a rocket from a kite using spinning tops for nozzles. Akai drops in, but ends up causing the kite to tear up. It seems that the kite may be out of reach for Tenho and Tenten. Seikichi convinces a doubtful Shunpei to attach the spinning top rockets around the kite, though launching them really was a bad idea. Santa, Rokubei and Shinza use a steam engine, borrowed from the old man, to power up their helicopter contraption, being able to clamp onto the kite before it descends towards the ground.
16	""That Thing" Is Me!" "Atashi wa Are yo!" (あたしはアレよ!)	July 18, 2007
Toyama scares Akai off by threatening to rat him out for trying to apprehend Seikichi and Sora. Seikichi, meeting the blue girl for the first time, is unaware that Sora and Ginjiro are trying to hunt her down. In the meadow, the blue girl secretes another blue sky beast, for which the Men in Black fail to pursue. When Sora transforms, the residents begin to attack her, but she evades after seeing Seikichi. When the blue girl comes home to Akai, she reveals that Sora is the white sky beast. Later on, Torii tells Akai that he allowed Mizuno to promote Toyama from city commissioner to senior investigator. When Akai raids the row house, he forces Sora to transform by injuring Seikichi.
17	"Killing Melody at First Light" "Reimei no Koroshibushi" (黎明の殺し節)	July 25, 2007
Sora is saddened that Seikichi thinks that she is a monster. Ginjiro unveils that he is the captain of the Men in Black working under Torii, while Sora reveals that Ginjiro has been protecting her from being noticed. As Torii manages to subdue and capture Sora, the residents fend him off. After encountering the blue girl in her true form, Seikichi ascertains that Sora was right all along, having to destroy his shed as a result. Ginjiro provokes Seikichi by saying that Sora is a serial killer, only to get him to say that she is a kindhearted girl.
18	"Up Against the Divine Lord's Dungeon" "Aite wa Shinkun no Kakushiana" (相手は神君の隠し穴)	August 1, 2007
Seikichi invites all the residents to accompany him in rescuing Sora. Tenho and Tenten find out that Sora is inside an underground dungeon of Mizuno's castle. Oriku allows the residents to plan out their next move at her family shop. Ginjiro is assisted by Oise, along with Tenho and Tenten, to escape from Torii and to be brought to the old man. Seikichi catapults himself toward the dungeon, Ginjiro captures Mizuno and Oise prepares to fight the blue girl. Seikichi wants to free Sora, despite her appearance as a monster. Akai lets the two escape out of the dungeon, but he then fires a gunshot directly at Seikichi.
19	"Utter Nonsense" "Tochi Gurutte Sōrō" (とち狂って候)	August 8, 2007
Sora transforms into her true form, but is restrained by Akai. Seikichi is revealed to have survived the gunshot, due to wearing a bulletproof vest. Tenho and Tenten show evidence that Akai is responsible for the murders, to which Torii comes to arrest him for this crime. Soon after, the blue girl arrives and takes him back with her. The old man displays his youth potion to the residents, as he was known for being a famous scholar. Oise tells them that Ginjiro left the row house for good. Tetsuju is currently with the blue sky beast that had split off from the blue girl. Ginjiro encounters Akai and engages in battle against him. Suddenly, the blue sky beast locates a giant sky vessel from within the mountains.
20	"Woman Who Smiles in the Face of Hardship" "Nangi ni Hohoemu Onna" (難儀に微笑む女)	August 15, 2007
Akai confesses that he wants to elope with the blue girl, but he defeats Ginjiro for denying his feelings for Sora. Both Sora and the blue girl attack the blue sky beast on the sky vessel. Seikichi takes Ginjiro back to his shop to help him recuperate. As Akai and the blue girl follow a weakened blue sky beast inside the sky vessel, Seikichi, Sora and Ginjiro soon trail right behind them. It is uncovered that the blue girl attempted to split her consciousness in half, which is a serious crime on her planet. The three tail behind Akai with the blue girl into the control room. However, the blue sky beast absorbs and blasts Seikichi's rockets, heavily wounding the blue girl. Seikichi, after Ginjiro opens a portal inside the blue sky beast, manages to destroy it using his last rocket. Seikichi, Sora and Ginjiro abandon the sky vessel when the self-destruct sequence is activated. Even though he wants to stay with her, Akai is ejected out by the blue girl right before the explosion occurs.
21	"You Get Three Digressions" "Dassen wa Sando Made" (脱線は三度まで)	August 22, 2007
Seikichi is given permission to build the rocket for Sora on an island outside the row house. Genzo has now reverted to his human form. Oise is directing a play about the rocket being constructed, of which Tenho and Tenten put up flyers in the streets for advertisement. Tenho and Genzo respectively take on the roles of Seikichi and Sora, though Sora does her own voice-over. When the scene turns to when Sora was to return to the Moon, Sora improvises that she would want to stay with Seikichi instead. Oddly enough, Seikichi causes the theater to detonate, yet the residents go on to celebrate their success. Seikichi promises to plan a big party for Sora when the rocket is finished.
22	"It Was Just a One-Night Dream" "Tatta Ichiya no Yume Datta" (たった一夜の夢だった)	August 29, 2007
It seems there is a labor shortage in trying to have the rocket assembled. To solve the problem, the old man recruits a group of cat humans to help. Shunpei takes a whiff of a secret potion that consequently attracts any woman. Sora tells Onui to find the old man for the antidote. Onui changes into her dog form and travels in the downpour, finding the rejuvenated old man at a clubhouse. The women cause a riot at the town tower, all fighting for Shunpei out of love. Onui races toward Shunpei as a dog, and she gives him the antidote as a human by kissing him.
23	"Fireworks for the Sword Dance" "Kenbu ni Hanabi o Dōzo" (剣舞に花火をどうぞ)	September 5, 2007
As he continues to travel, Ginjiro overhears a group of children reenacting the legend of the Silver Fox and the Night Flower. Toyama tells Oise and Tenho that shipments of gunpowder had failed to arrive from Osaka, due to a band of thieves called the Night Foxes. The two, along with Tetsuju, take a trip there to solve the case. Ginjiro reunites with his former acquaintance named Tenbe Mimasaka, shocked that he had survived after the revolution long ago, now being blind as a result. Upon encountering Gonji, who serves Tenbe some potato stew, Ginjiro departs with suspicion. At night, Oise, Tenho and Tetsuju are soon surrounded by the Night Foxes. It is revealed that Tenbe is the leader of this band of thieves. His purpose is to make a second attempt in overthrowing the government. Ginjiro comes to the rescue and confronts his acquaintance. Oise, Tenho and Tetsuju defeat the Night Foxes, while Ginjiro conquers over Tenbe. As the fireworks burst into the sky, Ginjiro is reminded of his ambitions.
24	"Hijack the You-Know-What!" "○○ Marumaru o Nottore!" (○○をのっとれ!)	September 12, 2007
The rocket is now ready for liftoff. There are signs that show that the blue sky beast is still alive. Shunpei, in a drunken stupor, assumes that Seikichi is looking for Sora, since he does not want her to leave. Tetsuju notices the blue sky beast atop the rocket. As the rocket launches, it begins to deteriorate. The residents find Tetsuju, interrogating him about what happened. Toyama spreads good news that everyone will be able to help rebuild the rocket. It is later found out that Torii requested Oriku to build a roller-coaster platform to launch a cannon into the sky to attack foreign ships.
25	"When a Master's Work Cries for the Moon..." "Takumi no Shigoto ga Tsuki ni Naite..." (匠の仕事が月に泣いて...)	September 19, 2007
As the cannon is prepared to launch, Torii spots Ginjiro on the platform, engaging in battle against him. When the rocket is ignited, the ice on the platform begins to crack, the rocket kills a crowd in canoes and the platform itself is destroyed. Oriku is upset that her project was a failure. When Seikichi, Sora and Shunpei returns to the island, the residents suffer from thrift laws as a consequence of the faltered cannon. As Ginjiro finds out that Torii wanted to attack foreign ships, he also realizes that Toyama wants to bomb foreign countries. Seikichi proceeds to launch the rocket the next day, all to show everyone the greatest creation ever made, despite Toyama's plans. Akai encounters the blue sky beast, who was disguised in human form.
26	"Somehow of Other, Liftoff" "Nanda kanda no Rifuto Ofu" (なんだかんだのリフトオフ)	September 26, 2007
Even though Akai defeats the blue sky beast, multiple blue sky beasts emerge from the pool of water. Oise informs Ginjiro that Seikichi would be controlling the ignition from inside the rocket come liftoff. Akai, after being defeated, sees a vision of the blue girl before he passes away. When Seikichi and Sora board the rocket, a horde of blue sky beasts approach, prompting Ginjiro to slaughter them before telling Seikichi and Sora to start ignition. Many fireworks begin to burst, implying that the two were obliterated, however they were never inside the rocket in the first place. Sora is soon summoned by her people to return to the Moon, and the residents all agree that Seikichi should go with her. In the end, everyone decides to inhabit a base on the Moon.

== Reception ==
Writing for the Los Angeles Times, Charles Solomon ranked the series the fifth best anime on his "Top 10".
