= Yūko Satō (voice actress) =

Japanese voice actress

- 佐藤 ゆうこ
- Born: Sumiko Toma (當眞 須美子); December 25, 1970 (age 55); Kanagawa Prefecture, Japan
- Status: Married
- Occupation: Voice actress
- Years active: 1990–present
- Agent: Aksent
- Height: 158 cm (5 ft 2 in)

Yūko Satō (佐藤 ゆうこ, Satō Yūko; born December 25, 1970 as Sumiko Toma (當眞 須美子, Toma Sumiko)) is a Japanese voice actress from Kanagawa Prefecture, Japan. She is currently affiliated with Aksent.

== Filmography ==
=== Animation ===
- Agent Aika as White Delmo R
- Animal Yokocho as Issa
- Astro Boy as Kenichi
- Black Jack as Sharaku
- Crayon Shin-chan: Ankoku Tamatama Daitsuiseki as Hostage
- Crayon Shin-chan: Dengeki! Buta no Hizume Daisakusen as Segi
- Digimon Data Squad as Young Tohma (ep 15)
- Doraemon Comes Back as Child
- Doraemon: Nobita and the Strange Wind Rider as Tomjin
- Dr. Pinoko no Mori no Bouken as Sharaku
- Eureka Seven as Holland Novak (Teenager)
- Flag as Hakan Akbal
- Fullmetal Alchemist as Lust
- Gad Guard as Takumi Kisaragi
- Gegege no Kitaro as Yuki-onna (ep 7)
- Gintama as Oryou
- Gun X Sword as Lin (ep 8)
- InuYasha (Ep 166–7)
- Kaleido Star as Julia
- Mobile Suit Gundam Seed as Juri Wu Nien
- Mobile Suit Gundam SEED: Special Edition as Muruta Azrael (Young)
- Naruto as Akane
- Oh! Edo Rocket as Genzou Mama
- Rumiko Takahashi Anthology as female subordinate (ep 9); housewife (ep 1)
- Saiyuki Reload as Kami (child) (ep. 22, 24)
- SD Gundam Force as Gundamusai; Raimi
- Shaman King as Yoh Asakura (2001 anime)
- The SoulTaker as Sanae
- The World of Narue as Rokugo (ep 3)
- Yu-Gi-Oh! 5D's as Michel (ep 70)

== Japanese dubbing roles ==
- Fringe, Astrid Farnsworth (Jasika Nicole)
- Identity, Ginny Virginia (Clea DuVall)
- Smokin' Aces, Georgia Sykes (Alicia Keys)
