= Poppets Town =

Children's animated television series

- Title card
- Also known as: PoppetsTown
- Genre: Comedy; Animated series
- Created by: Jun Ichihara
- Based on: ポペッツタウン by Jun Ichihara
- Developed by: Katherine Sandford
- Showrunner: Jun Ichihara
- Directed by: Josep Viciana
- Voices of: English; Cory Doran; Bryn McAuley; Cameron Ansell; Martin Roach; Julie Lemieux; Adam Reid; Richard Binsley; Krystal Meadows; Neil Crone; Scott McCord; Arnold Pinnock; Rob Tinkler; Philip Williams; Japanese; Kappei Yamaguchi; Shiho Hisajima; Tōko Aoyama; Masanori Machida; Hikari Yono; Tsutomu Densaka; Eisuke Asakura
- Theme music composer: Steve D'Angelo and Terry Tompkins for Eggplant Music & Sound
- Opening theme: "We Get Around in Poppets Town"
- Ending theme: "We Get Around in Poppets Town" (Instrumental)
- Composers: Steve D'Angelo and Terry Tompkins for Eggplant Music & Sound
- Countries of origin: Canada; Spain; Japan
- Original languages: English; Spanish; Japanese
- No. of seasons: 1
- No. of episodes: 26 (52 segments)

Production
- Executive producers: Beth Stevenson; Anne Loi; Neil Court; Cristina Brandner
- Producers: Kym Hyde; Susana González
- Production locations: Toronto, Ontario, Canada; Barcelona, Catalonia, Spain; Urayasu, Chiba, Japan
- Running time: 22 minutes (12 minutes per episode)
- Production companies: Decode Entertainment; Neptuno Films; OLC Rights Entertainment (Japan) Limited

Original release
- Network: Knowledge Kids and TVOKids (Canada)
- Release: January 1, 2009 – May 1, 2011
- Network: Playhouse Disney and Disney Channel (Spain)
- Release: December 28, 2009 – January 1, 2016
- Network: Disney Channel (Playhouse Disney block) (Japan)
- Release: October 5, 2009 – January 13, 2010

Poppets Town, French title: Les Popilous (also styled as PoppetsTown; Popilouville in French) is a Japanese-influenced animated comedy children's television series produced by Decode Entertainment (later DHX Media, now WildBrain) and Neptuno Films in association with OLC Rights Entertainment. It is based on characters, picture books, and merchandise created by Japanese author and illustrator Jun Ichihara in 2004. The series formerly aired on Knowledge Kids and TVOKids in Canada. The series premiered on January 1, 2009, and ended on May 1, 2011, with a total of 26 episodes (52 segments).

== Overview ==
Poppets Town follows the adventures of Blooter and his best friends Patty and Bobby as they solve everyday problems in Poppets Town.

== Characters ==
=== Main ===
Blooter (ブルーター, Burūtā)
Voiced by: Cory Doran (English); Kappei Yamaguchi (Japanese)
Blooter is a blue tall anthropomorphic dog with dark blue polka-dots on his body. He has long ears, a short tail, a red nose, and black bead eyes. Blooter also wears no clothes, (the yellow helmet with a white stripe on his head when riding his scooter, red collar around his neck, and a yellow backpack on his back as exceptions). He is smart, friendly, fun, energetic, inventive, adventurous, and he loves to ride his scooter that runs on "Blooter power" and being the leader of the Poppets. He is the only Poppet who comes up with ideas to solve problems, and he is Patty & Bobby's best friend. He also likes being a rapper, and he likes to sing on the microphone while rapping. He has a spy codename called "Poppet-Scoot". His catchphrases are "Poppets Away!", "Scoot-toot!", "Popporific!", and "My brain just popped a great idea!".
Patty (パティ, Pati)
Voiced by: Bryn McAuley (English); Shiho Hisajima (Japanese)
Patty is a bright yellow short anthropomorphic cat girl with two ears, a long curled tail, and two black whiskers like most cats have. She also has large round black eyes with prominent eyelashes and a small red nose. Patty also wears a bright pink dress with light-colored flowers and a blue bandana around her neck. She is sweet, loving, kind, smart, intelligent, friendly, helpful, and she loves to ride her bright pink helicopter called the "Patter-Patter" and carries a green laptop when her friends need more info to solve problems, which she calls her "Patty-puter". She is the only Poppet who knows almost everything, and she is also best friends with Blooter & Bobby. Her favorite instrument are the drums. She has a spy codename called "Cookie-Finder". She's also a fun party planner, as she plans to throw parties at the end of an episode.
Bobby (ボビー, Bobī)
Voiced by: Cameron Ansell (English); Tōko Aoyama (Japanese)
Bobby is an orange anthropomorphic bear with round ears, a black nose, and bead eyes. He wears a yellow shirt with pink polka-dots, which he calls his "lucky shirt", and a blue beret on his head. He is friendly, helpful, creative, supportive, and he loves to ride his bright yellow mobile van called the "clubhouse" that runs on "solar power" and hangs a camera around his neck when taking pictures. He is the only Poppet who helps with the equipment, and he is also best friends with Blooter & Patty. His favorite instrument is the guitar. He has a spy codename called "Nail-Hammer".

=== Recurring ===
Alli (アリ, Ari)
Voiced by: Martin Roach (English); Masanori Machida (Japanese)
Alli is an anthropomorphic alligator who wears a shirt with red and white stripes, a red beret on his head, and glasses around his eyes. He also works at a music store and drives a ladybug-shaped car that runs on a "battery". When he sees Blooter, he always says "Blooter-Dooda" as a catchphrase when he passes by. His favorite instruments are the saxophone, piano, and keyboard.
Cocori (ココリ, Kokori)
Voiced by: Julie Lemieux (English); Hikari Yono (Japanese)
Cocori is an anthropomorphic chicken girl with a short tail, a yellow beak, and black bead eyes. She wears a pink shirt, a blue scarf around her neck, a red helmet on her head, and roller skates on her feet. Similar to Alli and Cozy who are recurring characters, she is sweet, loving, kind, optimistic, hardworking, friendly, and she also works at a cafe and drives an egg-shaped car that runs on a "wind-up key", (but she doesn't use it very often). Her favorite hobby is making smoothies. Her catchphrase is "chicken barks", when she talks.
Cozy (コージー, Kōjī)
Voiced by: Adam Reid (English); Tsutomu Densaka (Japanese)
Cozy is an anthropomorphic zebra with red and white stripes. He has round ears, a long tail, and black bead eyes. Cozy also wears no clothes, (the red helmet on his head when riding his blue wooden horse as exception). He likes to look after traffic when he's at the crossroads and rides a blue wooden horse that runs on "rocking power". He also lives in a house with a large horseshoe on the roof.
Captain Cap (キャップ, Kyappu)
Voiced by: Adam Reid (English); Eisuke Asakura (Japanese)
Captain Cap is a pink anthropomorphic sheep with white wool. He has long ears, a small red nose, and black bead eyes. Captain Cap also wears a blue scarf around his neck, a red beret on his head, and shoes on his feet. He was also formerly known as a pirate and now drives a duck-shaped boat and lives on it. He used to have a lot of pirate mates, but he never hangs out with them anymore. He is the oldest and wisest of the Poppets, and he loves to tell his pirate stories when his friends needed help. His catchphrase is "Argh!".
The Naka-Nakas (ナカナカブラザーズ, Nakanakaburazāzu)
Voiced by: Richard Binsley (English); Hikari Yono (Japanese)
The Naka-Nakas are a trio of purple anthropomorphic monkey brothers. There are three of them: Robin, Jojo and Nicky, with round ears, a small yellow nose, and blue and black eyes. The Naka-Nakas also wears a striped shirt of different colors, a ribbon scarf around their neck, and a funny hat on their heads. They also lives in a treehouse and loves to ride their banana-shaped car that runs on "Naka-Naka power". Their favorite hobby is singing and dancing, and their favorite instrument are the bongo drum.
Candy (キャンディ, Kyandi)
Candy is a caterpillar of different colors with 12 legs. She also plays with leaves, and she uses them to fly in the air.
Mathilda (マチルダ, Machiruda)
Mathilda is a bee with orange and red stripes who loves to ride her fish-shaped airplane called the "Patapata". She is also Candy's best friend.

== Episodes ==
The episodes was completed sometime around 2008-2009.

No.	Title	Written by	Canadian air date
1	"Ice Cream Dream (Japanese: アイスクリーム・ドリーム)" "Under the Rainbow (Japanese: 虹のもとで)"	Katherine Sandford	January 1, 2009; Japan: October 5, 2009
Blooter, Patty and Bobby are excited to cool off on a hot day with some fresh ice cream at Cocori's Cafe. But when they arrive, they discover Cocori's freezer is broken and all the ice cream is melting. It's a race to find some ice to keep it cold. Rain threatens to ruin the Poppets Town spring picnic, so the Poppets race around town to find a dry spot.
2	"Butterfly Flutter (Japanese: チョウチョのひらひらちゃん)" "Tutti Frutti (Japanese: まぜまぜフルーツ・スムージー)"	Katherine Sandford	January 1, 2009; Japan: October 9, 2009
Patty makes a new butterfly friend who suddenly flies away. Patty and the gang race around Poppets Town looking for her, until they learn that butterfly's love flowers, so they make a garden. Cocori is in the middle of making smoothies and asks Blooter, Patty, and Bobby to watch her bananas while she goes to get more milk. While they are on guard, the Naka-Nakas sneak in and eat most of the bananas. The Poppets must race around town finding new kinds of fruit to replace the missing bananas before Cocori gets back.
3	"Moon Dance (Japanese: お月様を探せ！)" "Leaf Pile a-Go-Go (Japanese: 落ち葉をばらまけ)"	Katherine Sandford	January 1, 2009; Japan: October 13, 2009
The Naka-Nakas are holding a sleep-out under the stars. Part of the event is the performance of the "Moon Dance", but the moon doesn't show up. Blooter, Patty, and Bobby help the Naka-Nakas find out where the moon went, and Bobby learns a way to enjoy sleeping under the stars. Patty and Blooter help Bobby rake around the clubhouse, but then they must find a place to put all the fall leaves. It's a race around Poppets Town to find out who has a use for all these leaves.
4	"A Road for a Toad (Japanese: ヒキガエルの道)" "Too Many Cooks (Japanese: ケーキ作り大作戦)"	Bruce Robb Steven Westren	May 13, 2009; Japan: October 17, 2009
The Poppets help a group of baby toads find a safe migration route through Poppets Town, and Blooter learns what it takes to be a good leader. Patty wants to bake a birthday cake and surprise Cocori. Just because they've eaten lots of cakes, doesn't mean they know how to make one. After a failed attempt to make a delicious surprise, the Poppets learn about recipes.
5	"Poppets in a Pickle (Japanese: ピクルスで大ピンチ)" "A Cozy Song (Japanese: コージー・コージー・ソング)"	Sheila Dinsmore Clive Endersby	March 15, 2009; Japan: October 21, 2009
When a pickle smell invades Poppets Town, our gang must find the source of the problem and solve it with a monkey washing machine! Blooter, Patty and Bobby create a song for Cozy and get everyone to sing it as a surprise. Cozy feels left out until he discovers how much effort has been made for him. Song: "The Cozy Cozy"
6	"Kite Flight (Japanese: たこたこ上がれ)" "The PoppetsTown Castle (Japanese: 砂のお城を作ろう)"	Betty Quan Craig Martin	April 11, 2009; Japan: October 25, 2009
Blooter can't control his kite and it takes off in the wind. It's a race around Poppets Town to find the kite, but they don't even know where to begin. Captain Cap teaches them about the wind and they discover that simply adding a tail to a kite can make a world of difference. The Poppets spend a day at the beach building sand castles, but they are surprised when their hard work disappears! They learn about something called the “tide” and realize that making sand castles isn't about the finished product; it's about the fun of building them.
7	"Lava Luau (Japanese: ハワイアン・パーティー)" "PoppetsTown Day (Japanese: ポペッツタウンデー)"	Katherine Sandford Clive Endersby	May 1, 2009; Japan: October 29, 2009
Patty decides to host a Hawaiian-themed luau party. To make the event more exciting, Blooter has the great idea to make a paper mache volcano. Bobby realizes his fears were based on a misunderstanding and discovers that he is actually quite brave. Blooter, Patty, and Bobby decide that a parade is the best way to celebrate "PoppetsTown Day", and Blooter discovers what he really loves about PoppetsTown. Song: "We're in a Parade for PoppetsTown Day"
8	"Bushy-Tail's Treasure (Japanese: ピンキーの宝物)" "The Dusty Gusts (Japanese: くしゃみよ、止まれ！)"	Sheila Dinsmore Steven Westren	May 1, 2009; Japan: November 2, 2009
When Captain Cap's old friend Bushy-Tailed Binky shows up, the gang comes along on a hunt for buried pirate treasure. They figure out that since Bushy-Tail is a squirrel, his treasure is acorns. When they can't find the acorns, they figure out that they grew into the trees around them. The Naka-Nakas are trying to perform their purple poppy pyramid, but something keeps making Bobby sneeze, which knocks the Naka-Nakas over! Patty and her pals try to figure out what's making Bobby so sneezy and at the same time they learn about allergies.
9	"The Mystery of Mount Poppet (Japanese: まねまねオバケ)" "Quack Quest (Japanese: アヒルの大冒険)"	Craig Martin Bruce Robb	May 1, 2009; Japan: November 6, 2009
When the Naka-Nakas get scared of the "Mickey Moo Monster" on Mount Poppet after singing a song, the gang joins together to prove there is no such thing as monsters. Song: "Ticky Tacky Mickey Moo" sung by Richard Binsley (Naka-Nakas) The Poppets help Cap find a lost shipment of Rubber Duckies so everyone can have bubble baths again.
10	"Box-Car Bobby (Japanese: 箱がいっぱい)" "Bye Bye Birdie (Japanese: 飛べ飛べ小鳥ちゃん)"	Betty Quan Sara Snow and Katherine Sandford	May 1, 2009; Japan: November 10, 2009
Bobby's clubhouse is stuffed with cardboard boxes. Rather than throwing the boxes away, the gang comes up with fun and creatively crafty ways to re-use them. The gang meets Suki, a little bird who wants to fly, while at the same time Blooter learns to juggle.
11	"See the Bee (Japanese: ハチミツのヒミツ)" "Treehouse Trouble (Japanese: ナカナカの兄弟ゲンカ)"	Bruce Robb Sheila Dinsmore	May 1, 2009; Japan: November 14, 2009
When Cocori runs out of honey, the gang visits Uncle Ollie's Farm to get more and Patty overcomes her fear of bees. When the Naka-Nakas have an argument over what color to paint their treehouse, the gang must figure out a way to resolve the disagreement and help them stay calm by using different colors.
12	"Patty's Neverending Story (Japanese: みんなのポペッツタウン劇場)" "The Trouble with Bubbles (Japanese: シャボン玉パニック)"	Katherine Sandford Steven Westren	May 1, 2009; Japan: November 18, 2009
Patty wants to make up a story for Candy and Mathilda, but she's having trouble finding the ending. Finally, she and her friends decide to put on a play to finish the end of the story together. Bobby makes a bubble machine for Patty's bubble dance, but things go awry when the whole town becomes full of bubbles.
13	"Bird Bath (Japanese: 小鳥のお風呂)" "Find the Naka-Nakas (Japanese: どこどこナカナカブラザーズ)"	Craig Martin Betty Quan	May 1, 2009; Japan: November 22, 2009
The gang builds a bird bath for Suki but are mystified when the water keeps disappearing. They learn about evaporation and figure out a way to keep Suki's bird bath full. A game of hide-and-seek is made extra challenging when the Poppets gang blindfold themselves. Without the use of their sight, they home in on the Naka-Naka Brothers through their other senses.
14	"Spring Egg-stravaganza (Japanese: 春のたまご祭り)" "Mistaken Mistake (Japanese: キャップの大事な宝物)"	Katherine Sandford Clive Endersby	May 1, 2009; Japan: November 26, 2009
It's the beginning of spring, and Poppets Town is having their annual Spring Egg-stravaganza. The Poppets decide to decorate some eggs for Cocori this year, which in turn leads them on a great egg hunt mystery. When Blooter, Patty, and Bobby are delivering a large chest to Cap, it falls in the water. Patty blames herself for the mishap. They use a giant magnet to lift it out of the water, only to discover that Cap wanted it in the water as a surprise for his old seal friend Slinky Pete.
15	"Poppoween (Japanese: ポペッツ・ハロウィン)" "Doozy Dilemma (Japanese: 元気モリモリになろう！)"	Steven Westren Sheila Dinsmore	October 31, 2009; Japan: November 30, 2009
It's Poppoween, and every year, they try to fool Captain Cap with their costumes. This year, Patty is determined to be the one that fools him the most, and everyone else for that matter. Note: This episode is a parody of Halloween. It's apple-picking day, but the Naka-Nakas (PoppetsTown's top apple pickers) are too doozy. The Poppets learn that it was all the sugar they ate that's making them lose their quick monkey moves.
16	"Lights Out (Japanese: 明かりを消そう)" "Naka-Naka-Steppa-Clicka (Japanese: はじめてのコンサート)"	James Backshall Clive Endersby	November 1, 2009; Japan: December 4, 2009
The Poppets can't wait for the meteor shower, but they are disappointed when they can't see anything because of the bright lights of Poppets Town. Blooter, Patty, Bobby, and Alli are practicing for the first performance of their new band when the Naka-Naka Brothers decide to dance with them. But their freestyle movements are too wild, and it takes Cap's knowledge of dance plus some help from Blooter, Patty, and Bobby to help the Naka-Nakas learn a routine that becomes the hit of the show. Song: "The Naka-Naka-Steppa-Clicka" sung by Cory Doran (Blooter), Bryn McAuley (Patty), Cameron Ansell (Bobby), Martin Roach (Alli), Adam Reid (Captain Cap), and Richard Binsley (Naka-Nakas)
17	"Along Came a Spider (Japanese: キラキラ、クモの巣)" "Shadow Play (Japanese: 恥ずかしがり屋のお友達)"	Richard Clark	November 1, 2009; Japan: December 8, 2009
After Bobby accidentally ruins a spider's web, the gang decides to make a new one. Bobby learns that sometimes it's best to leave nature alone. The Poppets are on a camping trip and Candy meets a new friend -- her shadow! The Poppets learn all about shadows and put on a shadow play.
18	"Blooter Gets a Boo-Boo (Japanese: いたたた！ブルーター)" "Rainy Day Blues (Japanese: 雨の日のすごし方)"	Katherine Sandford Craig Martin	November 1, 2009; Japan: December 12, 2009
Blooter accidentally hurts his thumb and has to spend the day resting while the rest of the Poppets try to finish the greatest fort ever built! In the process they learn all about tools. Bobby's upset because it won't stop raining. After visiting his friends around Poppets Town, he learns new and different ways to have fun in the rain and make the best of the situation.
19	"Patty and the Amazing Flying Squirrels (Japanese: パティのあこがれのサーカス団)" "Clubhouse Power (Japanese: クラビーが動かない！)"	Sheila Dinsmore Katherine Sandford	November 1, 2009; Japan: December 16, 2009
When the Amazing Flying Squirrels come to town, Patty decides to join the circus and learns the basics of gymnastics. When the solar-powered clubhouse runs out of power, the Poppets try to find an alternate power source so they can go on their camping trip. They learn about different modes of transportation and how they're powered, including good old reliable Poppet power to hike to their camping spot.
20	"Whistle While You Work (Japanese: 止まれの笛)" "The Wacka-Wacka Brothers (Japanese: いとこのワカワカブラザーズ)"	James Backshall Katherine Sandford	November 1, 2009; Japan: December 20, 2009
When Cozy loses his traffic whistle, the Poppets have to find a replacement so that traffic can keep moving in Poppets Town. The Naka-Naka Brothers are getting a visit from their cousins, the Wacka-Wacka Brothers, and Poppets Town is bracing itself for a huge monkey mess! Thankfully, it turns out the Wacka-Wacka Brothers are quite civilized and help inspire the Naka-Nakas to learn some table manners.
21	"Where's the Party? (Japanese: パーティー会場はどこ？)" "Water Wonder (Japanese: ポペッツタウンが水浸し)"	Richard Clark Clive Endersby	November 1, 2009; Japan: December 24, 2009
The gang has to move the Naka-Nakas' birthday party to a new location, and they learn about maps while making one to guide the guests. A stream of water closes the crossroads and Blooter, Patty, and Bobby discover a dam has been built across the river.
22	"Blooter's Hiccups (Japanese: ブルーターのしゃっくり)" "Patty the Fairy (Japanese: 妖精になったパティ)"	Craig Martin Katherine Sandford	November 1, 2009; Japan: December 28, 2009
When Blooter gets the hiccups, Bobby takes over his delivery route and quickly starts confusing the packages. Everyone ends up with the wrong delivery, and Bobby realizes that Blooter's job is a lot harder than he thought. Patty gets a surprise present from her Aunt Petunia: a fairy princess costume, complete with magic wand. With the help of the Poppets, she decides to grant wishes to everyone in town.
23	"Opposite Day (Japanese: 反対の日)" "Chicken Flap (Japanese: にわとりのバタバタ)"	Bruce Robb Shawn Kalb	January 1, 2010; Japan: January 1, 2010
When the gang wants to do something different, Uncle Ollie suggests doing opposites for the rest of the day, everyone tries doing things the opposite way. Cocori's cousin Jeejeeri visits PoppetsTown, but she doesn't speak the language. The Poppets have to figure out other methods of communication by using actions, drawings, sounds, and music to communicate with her, and they find common ground to build a mini-putt course for her, which she enjoys.
24	"Super Blooter (Japanese: 僕らのスーパー・ブルーター)" "Chester the Crab (Japanese: カニのチェスター)"	Sheila Dinsmore Betty Quan	January 7, 2010; Japan: January 5, 2010
Blooter decides he wants to be a super-hero after reading a comic book called "The Adventures of Captain Flea", but he doesn't know what his super-power will be. Each of the Poppets shares their own unique and help Blooter realize that his sense of smell is his super-power. Song: "His Name is Super Blooter" The Poppets make a new friend at the beach named Chester. Because he's a crab, Chester has trouble keeping up with some of the games and the Poppets learn that someone's differences can be their strengths.
25	"Solstice Celebration (Japanese: 冬至のお祝い)" "Bobby's Valentine (Japanese: ボビーのバレンタイン)"	Steven Westren Katherine Sandford	February 18, 2010; Japan: January 9, 2010
It's Winter and Blooter tries to get everything done before it gets dark. The Poppets investigate why the days get shorter as Winter comes, and celebrate the solstice. Note: This episode is about daylight saving, but celebrated as Christmas. Bobby decides to make extra-special Valentines for his friends using photos of all the great times they've had together. The other Poppets are so touched that they make a very special scrapbook for Bobby to keep track of his great memories.
26	"Eye Spy (Japanese: 探偵ごっこ)" "Backpack Backtrack (Japanese: 引き返してみよう)"	Katherine Sandford James Backshall	May 1, 2011; Japan: January 13, 2010
Blooter, Patty and Bobby are asked to find out who is taking Cocori's cookies. They decide to play detetives with code names and disguises. Even though they keep watch both at night and during the day, the cookies keep disappearing. Finally, Cap lends them a magnifying glass and they use it to find a clue: a trail of cookie crumbs that lead to a mouse hole and two very friendly mice. Blooter loses his backpack with a very important package in it for Patty. He learns to re-trace his steps to help find what he's lost and deliver the package to Patty. Song: "Alli's Rap" sung by Martin Roach (Alli), Cory Doran (Blooter), Bryn McAuley (Patty), and Cameron Ansell (Bobby) Note: This episode is the series finale.

== Broadcast ==
In addition to its broadcast in Canada on Knowledge Kids and TVOKids, the show has also been broadcast internationally. Disney Channel Latin America and Disney-ABC International Television Distribution have distributed the show for their channels on Playhouse Disney, later Disney Junior in the United Kingdom and Ireland, Latin America, Brazil, Spain, Scandinavia, Italy, Taiwan, Australia and New Zealand. However, it did not air on the American Disney Junior channel. In Japan, the series had previously aired on Disney Channel's Playhouse Disney block from October 5, 2009 to January 13, 2010, then made reruns on Disney Junior on July 3, 2011, and later aired on TVQ Kyushu Broadcasting on January 31, 2012. In Israel, it was broadcast on the Hop! Channel in 2010. The show aired in the United States on Discovery Familia from 2011 to 2014. It also aired on ABC Kids in Australia. ZooMoo aired this show in Brazil on September 11, 2013, as well as in Latin America on August 21, 2014. OLC has distributed the show in Japan.

As of now, the show is also available on streaming via Amazon and the Google Play Store.
