= Eisuke Asakura =

Japanese voice actor

- 朝倉 栄介
- Occupation: Voice actor
- Years active: 1999–present
- Agent: Arts Vision

Eisuke Asakura (朝倉 栄介, Asakura Eisuke) is a Japanese voice actor who is affiliated with Arts Vision.

== Filmography ==
=== Anime ===
==== 2000 ====
- Inuyasha (Yoro Kita)

==== 2002 ====
- Princess Tutu (Lysander)
- Naruto (Teuchi)

==== 2003 ====
- Wolf's Rain (Soldier)
- Gad Guard (Haneke)
- DC Da Capo (Jungle Ranger No. 4)
- Fullmetal Alchemist (Guards)

==== 2004 ====
- Ghost in the Shell: Stand Alone Complex 2nd GIG (Personal Ranger)
- Paranoia Agent (Takenori Kumakura)
- Mars Daybreak (People)
- Samurai Champloo (Owner, Ekiden Samurai)
- Tweeny Witches (Hydra)
- Fafner (Fishmonger)
- Bleach (Shinigami)

==== 2005 ====
- Pandalian (Wang)
- Kaiketsu Zorori (Clown, Daikonzame, Mekaburu)
- Fushigiboshi no Futago Hime (Kujira Santa)
- Emma: A Victorian Romance Second Act (Attendant)

==== 2006 ====
- Tactical Roar (Sailor)
- Kage Kara Mamoru! (Tokage Seijin buka)
- Fushigiboshi no Futago Hime Gyu! (TV)
- When They Cry - Higurashi no Naku Koroni (Caster)
- Inukami! (Man)
- Shonen Onmyouji (Taifu no Kimi)
- Ghost Slayers Ayashi (Father of Central Thickness)

==== 2007 ====
- Naruto: Shippuden (Teuchi)
- Oh! Edo Rocket (Ude)

==== 2008 ====
- Allison & Lillia (Welch chief conductor)
- Soul Eater (Failure)
- Little Village People (Taichi Shuubu)

==== 2011 ====
- Yondemasuyo, Azazel-san. Z (Andainpapa, Kuroiwa sensei)

==== 2012 ====
- Rock Lee no Seishun Full-Power Ninden (Teuchi)
- Robotics;Notes (Announcer/Driver)

==== 2016 ====
- Yo-kai Watch (Jerry)

=== Films ===
- Naruto Shippuden the Movie: The Will of Fire (Teuchi)

=== Video games ===
==== 2004 ====
- Fullmetal Alchemist: Dream Carnival (Customers)

==== 2005 ====
- SHINSENGUMI ~Bakumatsu Gensou Ren'ai Kitan~ (Kinetaro Itou)
- Rogue Galaxy (Dario)

==== 2006 ====
- Samurai Champloo: Samurai Action HIPHOP
- Blue Dragon (My Eventful)

==== 2008 ====
- Sonic Unleashed

=== Dubbing ===
==== Live-action ====
- The Dilemma (Nick Brannen (Kevin James))

==== Animation ====
- Chicken Little (Runt of the Litter)
- Camp Lazlo (Raj)
- Dexter's Laboratory (Robot)
- Poppets Town (Captain Cap)
- Survivor: The Australian Outback (Jeff Varner)
