= Inspector Gadget (disambiguation) =

Inspector Gadget is a media franchise spawned by the 1983 animated series of the same name.

Inspector Gadget may also refer to:

== Film and television ==
- Inspector Gadget (1983 TV series), the original animated series
- Inspector Gadget (film), 1999 live-action film
- Inspector Gadget 2, sequel to the 1999 film
- Inspector Gadget (2015 TV series), a 3D animated series based on the original

== Video games ==
- Inspector Gadget (video game), 1993
- Inspector Gadget: Mission 1 – Global Terror!, released 1992
- Inspector Gadget: Operation Madkactus
- Inspector Gadget: Gadget's Crazy Maze, released 2001
- Inspector Gadget: Advance Mission, released 2001
- Inspector Gadget: Mad Robots Invasion, released 2003

== Other uses ==
- Inspector Gadget (blogger), British police blogger
