= Inspector Gadget =

Media franchise

- Created by: Jean Chalopin; Andy Heyward; Bruno Bianchi
- Original work: Inspector Gadget
- Owners: WildBrain; Disney (film rights)
- Years: 1983–present

Print publications
- Comics: Inspector Gadget

Films and television
- Films: Inspector Gadget (1999); Inspector Gadget: Gadget's Greatest Gadgets (2000); Inspector Gadget's Last Case (2002); Inspector Gadget 2 (2003); Inspector Gadget's Biggest Caper Ever (2005)
- Television series: Inspector Gadget (1983–1985); Gadget Boy (1995–1998); Inspector Gadget's Field Trip (1996–1998); Gadget & the Gadgetinis (2002–2003); Inspector Gadget (2015–2018)

Games
- Video games: Inspector Gadget and the Circus of Fear; Inspector Gadget: Mission 1 – Global Terror!; Inspector Gadget; Inspector Gadget: Gadget's Crazy Maze; Inspector Gadget: Operation Madkactus; Inspector Gadget: Advance Mission; Inspector Gadget: Mad Robots Invasion; Gadget & the Gadgetinis; Inspector Gadget's MAD Dash; Inspector Gadget

Audio
- Soundtrack: Inspector Gadget

Inspector Gadget is a media franchise that began in 1983 with the DIC Entertainment animated television series Inspector Gadget. Since the original series, there have been many spin-offs based on the show, including additional animated series, video games, and films.

The franchise follows the adventures of the titular character, a well-meaning but dimwitted cyborg law enforcement officer, as he investigates the criminal schemes of Dr. Claw and his organization, M.A.D., and fruitlessly attempts to stop him. However, neither side is aware that it is Gadget's niece, Penny, and her dog, Brain, who are truly responsible for thwarting M.A.D.

== Main characters ==
=== Inspector Gadget ===
The main protagonist and eponymous character of the franchise and the mascot of DIC, initially voiced by Don Adams. Gadget is a cyborg (part man, part machine) with thousands of high-tech gadgets installed in his body, which he activates with the phrase "go-go gadget" before naming the device. Gadget is powerful, lovable, brave, caring and protective, and loyal to his career as a lawman, but he is also dim-witted, silly, clueless, incompetent and gullible. In many ways Gadget was reminiscent of Maxwell Smart (also portrayed by Don Adams) from the Get Smart TV show, using similar catchphrases and manners of speech. However, his attire and absent-minded personality are much closer to Peter Sellers' portrayal of Inspector Clouseau from the classic The Pink Panther series of movies. In fact, in the original Inspector Gadget pilot, he has a mustache just like Inspector Clouseau's, which was removed in subsequent episodes possibly to satisfy a copyright claim by MGM.

Gadget has a knack of inadvertently saving the day, usually without realizing he is doing so. Gadget loves his family more than anything and would do anything to keep them from harm, especially Penny. He was voiced by Don Adams in the original series and Inspector Gadget's Field Trip until Adams' retirement from voicing Gadget in 1999, Gary Owens and later Jesse White in the original series' pilot episode, Keith Scott in the KFC commercials in Australia and Maurice LaMarche in the Super Mario Bros. Super Show, Gadget & the Gadgetinis, the direct-to-video animated films, and various DIC Kids Network bumpers. For the 2015 series, the voice of Gadget is provided by Ivan Sherry. The first live-action film gave Gadget's real name as Jonathan "John" Brown, though later French promotional materials gave his real name as Augustin Tamare. He was portrayed by Matthew Broderick in the first film, and by French Stewart in the sequel.

=== Dr. Claw ===
Dr. Claw is the main antagonist of the franchise. He is the leader of an evil crime syndicate called M.A.D. Only his arms are shown, wearing silver gauntlets with golden and spiked wristbands, and a gold M.A.D. signet ring on one of the right middle fingers. He has a pet cat named MAD Cat, who is often napping but is startled awake when Dr. Claw slams his fist on his console if Gadget foils his evil plans. A parody of Ernst Stavro Blofeld from the James Bond franchise, his face is never seen at all (except in the first live action film, the second film had his face obscured by his hat and coat) with only his hands and pet cat visible. On a Dr. Claw action figure, the face was covered by a sticker on the box, which meant the toy had to be bought for his face to be seen. He is ruthless, murderous, sinister, dark, sadistic, and greedy, and will do anything to rule the world and destroy Gadget. In Gadget & the Gadgetinis, he reveals that he thinks Gadget's idiocy is an act to taunt him. In the 2015 series, he is noticeably less competent and malicious and the crimes he commits are a lot more petty, and is also accompanied by his nephew Talon, who acts as his second in command and a rival to Penny. He has been voiced by Frank Welker, Don Francks, Brian Drummond, Doug Rand, and Martin Roach. In the first live action film his name is revealed to be Sanford Scolex and he is portrayed by Rupert Everett. In Gadget & the Gadgetinis, his first name is George. Tony Martin subsequently took over the role of Dr. Claw in the sequel.

=== Penny ===
Penny is Gadget's intelligent niece and the one who really stops Dr. Claw's evil schemes. She uses many high-tech devices to help her secretly solve the cases and stop the bad guys such as a computer book, a video watch, a laptop, and a holographic tablet. However, her meddling often leads to her getting kidnapped by the villains, which leaves Brain to rescue her. She is 10 in the original series, 12 in Gadget & the Gadgetinis, 16 in Inspector Gadget's Biggest Caper Ever, and 14 (later turning 15) in the 2015 series. Penny loves her uncle more than anything, which is why she is always ready to help him behind his back, but on a few occasions she gets annoyed by his stupidity. In Inspector Gadget's Biggest Caper Ever, she is notably more selfish, and unlike any other version, she doesn't try to help her uncle at all. In the 2015 series, she has become an agent-in-training, is more physically active than in previous versions, and has a rivalry (and crush) with Dr. Claw's nephew, Talon.

For the original series, her voice was portrayed by Mona Marshall in the pilot episode, Cree Summer in the first season, and Holly Berger in the second season. In the commercials for KFC in Australia, she was voiced by Robyn Moore. Erica Horn provided her voice in Inspector Gadget Saves Christmas. From 2001 to 2005, she was voiced by Tegan Moss. Tara Strong voices her in the 2015 series. In the first live action film she is portrayed by Michelle Trachtenberg. Caitlin Wachs portrays her in the sequel.

=== Brain ===
Brain is Gadget and Penny's shy but intelligent, sweet, lovable and curious 4-(later 5)-year-old dog. He is the only one who knows that Penny is the one who really saves the world. Brain usually has the job of keeping Gadget safe on his missions while Penny investigates M.A.D's crimes. He usually disguises himself when following Gadget, which often causes Gadget to think he's a M.A.D Agent. He is absent in Gadget and the Gadgetinis and only shows up in pictures. The reason given for why he is absent is because after all the years of secretly helping Gadget, he has become phobic of gadgets, Gadget, and the word itself. He ran away to a riverside shack to get away from Gadget. He returned in the episode, No Brainer, where Penny made him a translation collar in order to help find Gadget. However, he does return in later spinoffs.

His voice was played in the original series by Frank Welker, Maurice LaMarche in Gadget and the Gadgetinis, and Scott McCord in the 2015 series. Lee Tockar voiced him in Inspector Gadget's Last Case (2002) and Inspector Gadget's Biggest Caper Ever (2005). In the first live action film he is voiced by Don Adams. In the sequel he is voiced by Jeff Bennett. In the Australian KFC commercials he was voiced by Keith Scott.

=== Chief Frank Quimby ===
Chief Quimby is Gadget's moody boss and the chief of the Metro City police (Riverton Police Department in the live-action Disney films). He usually pops up near the beginning of each episode to give Gadget a sheet of paper describing his mission. Once Gadget finishes reading them, the paper self-destructs and blows up in Quimby's face in a parody of Mission: Impossible. He appears at the end to congratulate Gadget and give him full credit for stopping Dr. Claw. He is unaware that Penny did all the work, even though she always calls him. In Gadget and the Gadgetinis, he has become an agent for the CIA. In the 2015 series, he is given glasses, and his hair is blonde instead of brown. He was mentioned by Gadget in some episodes of Inspector Gadget's Field Trip.

His voice in the original series was provided by John Stephenson in the pilot, Dan Hennessey in the first season, and Maurice LaMarche for the second season and the 1992 Christmas Special. Jim Byrnes voiced him in Inspector Gadget's Last Case (2002) and Inspector Gadget's Biggest Caper Ever (2005). He is voiced by Derek McGrath in the 2015 series. In the first live action film he is portrayed by Dabney Coleman. Mark Mitchell portrays him in the sequel.

== Recurring characters ==
List indicators

This section includes characters who will appear or have appeared in more than two films in the series.

- An empty grey cell indicates the character was not in the film, or that the character's official presence has not yet been confirmed.
- ^{V} indicates a voice-only role.
- ^{S} indicates an appearance as a character's singing voice.

Characters	Original series						Television special	Spin-off series					Live action films		Animated films	
Characters	Inspector Gadget (1983)		Inspector Gadget (2015)				Inspector Gadget Saves Christmas	Gadget Boy & Heather		Inspector Gadget's Field Trip		Gadget & the Gadgetinis	Inspector Gadget	Inspector Gadget 2	Inspector Gadget's Last Case	Inspector Gadget's Biggest Caper Ever
Characters	Season 1	Season 2	Season 1	Season 2	Season 3	Season 4	Inspector Gadget Saves Christmas	Season 1	Gadget Boy's Adventures in History	Season 1	Season 2	Gadget & the Gadgetinis	Inspector Gadget	Inspector Gadget 2	Inspector Gadget's Last Case	Inspector Gadget's Biggest Caper Ever
Inspector Gadget	Don Adams	Don Adams	Ivan Sherry	Ivan Sherry	Ivan Sherry	Ivan Sherry	Don Adams			Don Adams	Don Adams	Maurice LaMarche	Matthew Broderick	French Stewart	Maurice LaMarche	Maurice LaMarche
Inspector Gadget	Don Adams	Don Adams	Ivan Sherry	Ivan Sherry	Ivan Sherry	Ivan Sherry	Maurice LaMarche^{S}			Don Adams	Don Adams	Maurice LaMarche	Matthew Broderick	French Stewart	Maurice LaMarche	Maurice LaMarche
Dr. Claw	Frank Welker	Frank Welker	Martin Roach	Martin Roach	Martin Roach	Martin Roach	Frank Welker					Brian Drummond	Rupert Everett	Tony Martin	Brian Drummond	Brian Drummond
Dr. Claw	Don Francks	Frank Welker	Martin Roach	Martin Roach	Martin Roach	Martin Roach	Frank Welker					Brian Drummond	Rupert Everett	Tony Martin	Brian Drummond	Brian Drummond
Penny	Cree Summer	Holly Berger	Tara Strong	Tara Strong	Tara Strong	Tara Strong	Erica Horn					Tegan Moss	Michelle Trachtenberg	Caitlin Wachs	Tegan Moss	Tegan Moss
Brain	Frank Welker	Frank Welker	Scott McCord	Scott McCord	Scott McCord	Scott McCord	Frank Welker					Lee Tockar	Don Adams^{V}	Scooter and Riley	—N/a	Lee Tockar
Brain	Frank Welker	Frank Welker	Scott McCord	Scott McCord	Scott McCord	Scott McCord	Frank Welker					Lee Tockar	Don Adams^{V}	Jeff Bennett^{V}	—N/a	Lee Tockar
Talon			Lyon Smith	Lyon Smith	Lyon Smith	Lyon Smith										
Chief Quimby	Dan Hennessey	Maurice LaMarche	Derek McGrath	Derek McGrath	Derek McGrath	Derek McGrath	Maurice LaMarche					—N/a	Dabney Coleman	Mark Mitchell	Jim Byrnes	Jim Byrnes
Professor Von Slickstein	Andy Goldberg	Andy Goldberg	Scott McCord	Scott McCord	Scott McCord	Scott McCord										
Professor Von Slickstein	Don Francks	Don Francks	Scott McCord	Scott McCord	Scott McCord	Scott McCord										
Maryland Claw			Martin Roach									Teryl Rothery				
Gadget Boy								Don Adams	Don Adams	Don Adams						
Gadget Boy								Maurice LaMarche	Maurice LaMarche	Don Adams						
Gadgetmobile	Character is mute, inanimate object only	Character is mute, inanimate object only	Character is mute, inanimate object only	Character is mute, inanimate object only	Character is mute, inanimate object only	Character is mute, inanimate object only	Character is mute, inanimate object only	Character is mute, inanimate object only	Character is mute, inanimate object only	Character is mute, inanimate object only	Character is mute, inanimate object only	Character is mute, inanimate object only	D. L. Hughley^{V}	D. L. Hughley^{V}	Jaleel White	Bernie Mac
Mayor Wilson													Cheri Oteri	Sigrid Thornton		

== Series and television specials ==
=== Inspector Gadget (1983) ===
The original animated television series in the franchise, Inspector Gadget, debuted in 1983 and introduced audiences to the adventures of a clumsy, simple-witted bionic detective named Inspector Gadget – a human being with various bionic gadgets built into his body. Gadget's nemesis is Dr. Claw, the leader of an evil organization, known as "M.A.D".

Inspector Gadget was the first TV series from DiC Entertainment to be produced directly for syndication. Its two seasons originally ran from 1983 to 1985 and remained in syndication into the late 1990s.

=== Inspector Gadget Saves Christmas ===
In 1992, DiC produced an animated Christmas special based on the series, Inspector Gadget Saves Christmas. In the special, Dr. Claw has locked up Santa Claus at the North Pole and hypnotized his elves, forcing them to break all toys that are being produced. Inspector Gadget, Penny, and Brain travel to the North Pole in an attempt to stop Dr. Claw and save Christmas. This special was nominated for an Emmy. Don Adams, Frank Welker, Erica Horn and Maurice LaMarche provide the voices for the characters.

=== Gadget Boy & Heather ===
The 1995 Gadget Boy & Heather series was a spinoff from the original show. The series is about a younger version of Gadget, "Gadget Boy" (also voiced by Don Adams). Instead of Penny and Brain the Dog, Gadget Boy was assisted by the resourceful Heather (voiced by Tara Strong). Just as maladroit as his adult self is, Gadget Boy was usually bailed out of situations by the more practical Heather, though he was also helped greatly by his myriad of high-tech gadgets and extendable arms and legs. In this series, traditional nemesis Dr. Claw was replaced by the villainess Spydra. In addition, the chief, Strombolli had a "fax tie" that exploded after the mission was read, continuing the running gag from the original series in which Chief Quimby would get blown up by an exploding message.

=== Gadget Boy's Adventures in History ===
Two years later, in 1997, Gadget Boy & Heather spawned an educational spinoff, Gadget Boy's Adventures in History, which aired on The History Channel. This series marked the last time Don Adams would perform a voice role for an animated Gadget series two years before his retirement from voicing an animated Gadget in 1999 and eight years before his death in 2005.

=== Inspector Gadget's Field Trip ===
In 1996, Gadget took students around the world in this series of 50 field trips, mainly created to market to stations to fulfill the FCC E/I requirements. The show put an animated Inspector Gadget on top of live-action filming of the locations that Gadget guided viewers through. Don Adams returned as Gadget's voice while Penny, Brain, Chief Quimby (although mentioned by Gadget in some episodes), Capeman and Dr. Claw are entirely absent.

=== Gadget & the Gadgetinis ===
In 2002, the French studio SIP Animation (Saban International Paris), in cooperation with DiC, produced 52 episodes of the then-new TV series Gadget & the Gadgetinis. The series debuted on Channel 5 in the UK in August 2002, followed by French channel M6 in September 2002 and then on Fox Kids channels across Europe from 2003. It was planned to air in the United States on Fox Family, but after the Channel was acquired by Disney in 2001 it never did and so it has never aired in the United States.

Inspector Gadget (again voiced by Maurice LaMarche) is now a member of an organization called "WOMP" (World Organization of Mega Powers) and now holds the rank of Lieutenant. He is still aided in his work by Penny (who is now twelve years old), as well as the new robot characters Digit and Fidget, the titular Gadgetinis invented by Penny, due to Brain having run away due to a nervous breakdown. It follows the same plot as the original series, with the dim-witted Gadget attempting to fight crime on his own, while Penny and her helpers secretly do all the work. Dr. Claw, now with the first name George, returns as the main villain, with his relatives introduced in some episodes. In some stories, he is replaced by other villains.

The production values of this series were higher than any of the previous revivals and spinoff series. Also, the original creators of Inspector Gadget were all involved: Andy Heyward was one of the executive producers; Jean Chalopin wrote or co-wrote all the episodes, in addition to being credited as the new show's creator; whereas Bruno Bianchi directed and produced the series.

=== Inspector Gadget (2015) ===
A new computer-animated Inspector Gadget TV series had been in development since at least the start of 2012, possibly earlier. It was commissioned by Teletoon Canada, which aired the show, and put into preproduction by The Cookie Jar Company. In January 2012, the then-in-development show was mentioned by Ray Sharma, the CEO of XMG Studio, which produced the hit mobile game "Inspector Gadget: M.A.D. Dash". Sharma described how the success of the game had resulted in a new TV series having been in the making: "We did 1 million downloads in a week, and it's reinvigorated the TV brand with a new TV series in production."

In September 2012, Cookie Jar issued a short press release about the then-upcoming series, as part of the advertising for it during the MIPCOM market that October, stating: "Cookie Jar Entertainment is celebrating Inspector Gadget’s 30th anniversary with the launch of a brand-new series with its Canadian broadcast partner TELETOON. The series will again revolve around the iconic bionic bumbling detective." On June 9, 2013, Teletoon officially announced the reboot show with two press pictures of Gadget's new look as well as a press release: "MAD Agents, look out! Criminals, beware! Bystanders … take cover! Inspector Gadget is back to battle Dr. Claw with all-new gadgets – and all-new gadget-related chaos. But the loveable, bumbling, accidentally-destructive Inspector is not alone in the fight to take down MAD. His ever trusty police-dog, Brain, is still by his side and he's getting extra crime-fighting help from his new partner, Inspector-in-training Penny (voiced by Tara Strong). With MAD more powerful than ever and with the arrival of Dr. Claw's evil-genius (and totally crush-worthy) nephew Talon, Penny and Brain will need to use every ounce of their training to keep the world safe from Dr. Claw … and Gadget."

Unlike the other shows, Penny is more of the protagonist and Dr. Claw is as incompetent and useless as Gadget (if not more so). The series was produced by DHX Media, which purchased Cookie Jar in 2012. According to a DHX Media distribution catalogue released as a PDF on January 15, 2014, the show premiered in 2015 on Netflix.

On December 4, 2014, it was announced that the series has 26 episodes and that it would air on Boomerang's international channels in 2015. The series premiered on Boomerang in Australia on January 5, 2015.

== Films ==
=== Live-action ===
Inspector Gadget was adapted into a 1999 live action film by Walt Disney Pictures, starring Matthew Broderick as the title character and Rupert Everett as Dr. Claw. As opposed to the animated series, where Gadget is bumbling and clueless and Dr. Claw's face is never shown, Gadget appears to be more reliable and competent in detective work and Dr. Claw's face appears many times in the film. In addition, Gadget and Dr. Claw were also given civilian names; Jonathan "John" Brown and Sanford Scolex, respectively.

A second film, Inspector Gadget 2 featured many changes from the first one, such as Doctor Bradford no longer assisting Gadget or being his romantic interest, instead being replaced by a well-meaning and upbeat scientist named Baxter and a new romantic interest named G2 and Gadget and Claw's civilian names are no longer mentioned. Being a year later in the movie's timeline, Gadget had begun displaying his cartoon namesake's glitches by receiving the wrong gadget when he calls out a specific device. He falls in love with his intended replacement: the fully robotic G2. Furthermore, none of the cast from the first film returned to their roles except D. L. Hughley.

=== Animated ===
==== Inspector Gadget: Gadget's Greatest Gadgets ====
Released on VHS by Buena Vista Home Video in January 2000 to coincide with Disney's live action theatrical film, Inspector Gadget: Gadget's Greatest Gadgets takes the format of a clip show in which Gadget has a flashback to his past adventures in the original TV series, using footage from the episodes "The Capeman Cometh", "Prince of the Gypsies", and "Gadget's Gadgets"; as well as some stock footage from Inspector Gadget's Field Trip for the present-day segments. Maurice LaMarche did Inspector Gadget's voice in the modern segments, marking his first cartoon voice appearance as Gadget, who had previously been voiced by Don Adams. Original series actors Cree Summer and Frank Welker reprised their roles as Penny, Brain and Dr. Claw in the modern segments.

==== Inspector Gadget's Last Case ====
In 2002, as part of the DIC Movie Toons series of movies, DIC released a full-length animated television film called Inspector Gadget's Last Case, directed by Michael Maliani. It premiered on television on October 6, 2002, on Nickelodeon and was released on DVD and VHS shortly afterward by MGM Home Entertainment.

The film is about Inspector Gadget giving up his beloved but aging Gadgetmobile, while his archenemy Dr. Claw uses a competing crime fighter to discredit Gadget and cost him his badge. Penny and Brain make appearances as minor supporting characters. In this, Gadget is more competent, yet he is still bumbling, similar to his persona in the pilot episode and his Matthew Broderick counterpart. Even though the film uses the same character designs as the concurrent Gadget & The Gadgetinis TV series, SIP Animation was not involved with the production of this movie. Maurice LaMarche reprised the role of Gadget in this film and Jaleel White voiced the Gadgetmobile. In most European regions, the movie aired on Disney Channel or Toon Disney. In Germany, the film aired on Cartoon Network.

==== Inspector Gadget's Biggest Caper Ever ====
Inspector Gadget's Biggest Caper Ever was released on September 6, 2005, by Lions Gate Home Entertainment. It is the first Inspector Gadget animated production to be completely rendered using 3D computer animation. Its voice cast includes Maurice LaMarche as Inspector Gadget, Tegan Moss as Penny, Brian Drummond as Dr. Claw, and Bernie Mac as Gadgetmobile. In the film, Dr. Claw escapes from jail and seeks a prehistoric dragon-like creature that will help him get revenge on his captors and conquer the world. Production on the film was announced in May 2004, under the working title Inspector Gadget Saves the Day... Maybe.

=== Untitled live-action reboot film ===
In May 2015, it was announced that a new film with a rebooted version of the character is in the works. Like the live-action films, it will be done by Disney, with Dan Lin producing it. In October 2019, Mikey Day and Streeter Seidell were hired to write the film.

In June 2026, the film reentered development by Walt Disney Studios with Sean Anders set to direct and Will Ferrell in talks to star.

== Canceled projects ==
=== Gadget Girl ===
In November 1992, DIC announced they would be developing a spin-off titled Gadget Girl, featuring a female protagonist. In 1994, Bohbot Entertainment acquired US-syndication rights for airing on their Amazin' Adventures block. However, the series would never see the light of day.

During the development of fellow Gadget spin-off Gadget Boy, it was confirmed by staff that Gadget Girl was one of the many ideas in what would become Gadget Boy.

=== GI Gadget ===
In 1999, DIC announced they would be co-producing a new Inspector Gadget series to cash-in on the success of the live-action movie tentatively titled GI Gadget, which would be co-produced with French-animation studio Arles Animation. GI Gadget would have featured the titular character joining an elite army commando unit. The series was planned to start with a TV Movie in 2000 and the full series in 2001, but nothing else was mentioned of the series and was silently canceled not long after. Arles Animation would later be purchased by BKN International in June of that year.

=== Unnamed 2009 series ===
In April 2008, a new Inspector Gadget series was announced to premiere in Spring 2009 to celebrate the franchise's 25th anniversary. The series would have taken a darker tone than the other Inspector Gadget series, featuring a 2D/3D animesque art style with cinematic camera angles and dramatic musical cues, as well as new villains alongside Dr. Claw. The series was never produced, and was canceled likely due to DIC's purchase by Cookie Jar Entertainment in July 2008.

== Video games ==
The first game developed based on the series was Inspector Gadget and the Circus of Fear developed by Beam Software and scheduled for release by Melbourne House in the UK in 1987 for the Commodore 64 and ZX Spectrum. It resembled the arcade title Metro-Cross and was a left-to-right scrolling racing/jumping game with a quasi-isometric forced 3d perspective. Although the game was completed, and preview copies were reviewed (unfavourably) in the computing press, it was scrapped on the verge of release. The game featured a cameo by the titular character from the Horace series of games. An adventure game based on the series, Inspector Gadget: Mission 1 – Global Terror! was eventually released on the PC in 1990 by a company called Azeroth.

An LCD Electronic Inspector Gadget developed by Bandai was released in 1984.

An NES game was planned for release by Hudson Soft, but was quietly canceled. Instead, Hudson released an SNES game in 1993 simply called Inspector Gadget. The game features a rare glimpse of Dr. Claw's face.

In March 2000, it was announced that Ubi Soft had teamed with Light & Shadow Production to release an Inspector Gadget game for the PlayStation. That game was revealed as Inspector Gadget: Gadget's Crazy Maze, with a Game Boy Color title Inspector Gadget: Operation Madkactus, following as well.

After this partnership, Light and Shadow Production released three Inspector Gadget titles on their own - Inspector Gadget: Advance Mission for Game Boy Advance (Published by DreamCatcher Interactive in the United States) and two European-exclusive titles - Inspector Gadget: Mad Robots Invasion for the PlayStation 2 and Inspector Gadget Racing for the Game Boy Advance.

After Light & Shadow Production was purchased by Hip Games, the latter company released Gadget & Gadgetinis for the PlayStation 2 and PC in Europe.

An iOS game based on the series was first released by Namco in 2009. The Namco Inspector Gadget game was removed from the App Store in 2011. Another game titled Inspector Gadget's MAD Dash was released for iOS devices, iPhone and iPod Touch, by XMG Studio in 2010. It features Shuki Levy's original theme music and also includes original voices from the show. In the same game, Doctor Claw reveals his face and is once again given the first name George.

On April 27, 2023, publisher Microids announced a party game, Inspector Gadget – Mad Time Party, which was released on September 14, 2023 for Nintendo Switch, PlayStation 4, PlayStation 5, Xbox One, Xbox Series X/S and Windows. In this game, MAD has taken over Metro City, to which Professor Von Slickstein creates a time machine to prevent this from happening, however Gadget accidentally destroyed it and inadvertently summoned his ancestors from different eras in time. In order to fix this, Inspector Gadget and his ancestors compete in challenges to collect parts to repair the time machine, capture disguised MAD agents, and save Metro City from the rule of Dr. Claw.

== Music ==
The original Inspector Gadget theme song was composed by Israeli-American composer Shuki Levy (who also wrote the themes for Power Rangers and Digimon), and was based on Edvard Grieg's "In the Hall of the Mountain King".

Several early rap records sampling the Inspector Gadget theme song were released in 1985. The Kartoon Krew also released "Inspector Gadget" on ZYX Music, which contains vocal samples and quotes from the popular cartoon series, reenacted by the rap group for the song. East New York rap group Bad Boys & K-Love released a record on Starlite Records, "Bad Boys", featured on the UK hip hop compilation Street Sounds Electro 9. Following the trend, Slick Rick and Doug E. Fresh used samples from the Inspector Gadget theme song on their single "The Show". The theme song has been heavily sampled in the years since then. California-based punk band Lagwagon recorded a short instrumental cover of the theme song on their 1992 album Duh.

The new (2015) theme was composed by Canadian film and TV composers Stephen Skratt and Asher Lenz, "once again using In the Hall of the Mountain King as inspiration".

In 2023, co-creator Jean Chalopin's daughter, Tanis Chalopin, composed an original soundtrack for the video game "Inspector Gadget: MAD Time Party" as well as a new arrangement on the original theme.

== Books ==
A new Inspector Gadget comic book, based on the original 1983 TV series, was launched in the U.S. by Viper Comics in 2011. A preview issue was published as part of Free Comic Book Day on May 7, 2011; the entire story was then released officially in August as a 48-page comic book titled "Inspector Gadget: Gadget on the Orient Express". The comic book was written by Dale Mettam and illustrated by José Cobá. No follow-up issues have been released to date.

== Other appearances ==
On a 1989 episode of The Super Mario Bros. Super Show!, another DiC production, a live-action bumper segment titled "Defective Gadgetry" had a guest appearance by Inspector Gadget, in which he came to the Mario Bros. for help in repairing him. This was his first live-action appearance predating the 1999 live-action film that was released ten years later. Maurice LaMarche (who would assume the voice role in Inspector Gadget: Gadget's Greatest Gadgets ten years later) plays Gadget in this segment. A second live-action segment, "Treasure of the Sierra Brooklyn", had Gadget returning to help the Mario Bros. find a lost treasure.

The Robot Chicken episode "Adoption's an Option" featured a sketch featuring the Inspector Gadget characters in a parody of The Terminator. In this sketch, Gadget replaces a faulty part with a Cyberdyne part, only to be turned into an unstoppable killing machine when Skynet goes online. The sketch goes on to revolve around Penny and Brain trying to avoid being killed by the now-evil Gadget, eventually killing him in a factory. Meanwhile, MAD Cat dies of leukemia; at the end of the show, Dr. Claw blames Gadget for MAD Cat's death. Ironically, Dr. Claw claims that he somehow found out it was Penny and Brain who were behind all of Gadget's successful missions, and planned to gain control of Inspector Gadget via Skynet, and use him to kill them using the Cyberdyne technology that gained control of him. (Penny is voiced by Cree Summer and Brain and Dr. Claw by Frank Welker, who were the original voice actors for the characters.)

The 2019 video game Tales of the Neon Sea features a reference to Inspector Gadget in the form of a character called "Detective Gadget of Starlight City", who joined the police force on the 6th of September 2117 and was killed in action on August 5, 2126, protecting civilians.

In 2022, Both Gadget and Brain made a brief cameo appearance in a Renault Clio commercial made for France and Spain, featuring "Video Killed the Radio Star" by The Buggles.

== See also ==
- Dynomutt, Dog Wonder
