= List of Inspector Gadget (1983 TV series) episodes =

The following is a list of episodes of the Inspector Gadget television series.

== Series overview ==
Season	Episodes	Originally released	
Season	Episodes	First released	Last released
Pilot		December 4, 1982	
1	65	September 5, 1983	December 2, 1983
2	21	September 30, 1985	November 13, 1985

== Episodes ==
=== Pilot (1982) ===
Title	Directed by	Written by	Original release date	Prod. code
"Winter Olympics"	Bernard Deyriès; Bruno Bianchi; Toshiyuki Hiruma	Jean Chalopin; Andy Heyward	December 4, 1982	N/A
Dr. Claw tries to sabotage the Winter Olympics by replacing the torch bearer with a M.A.D. agent and the torch with a bomb and makes several attempts on Gadget's life as he balances his vacation in Winterland with an investigation into M.A.D.'s activities in the area. Note: Gadget has a mustache in the pilot, but it was later removed. Metro-Goldwyn-Mayer threatened to sue DIC because the character looked too similar to Inspector Clouseau from The Pink Panther movies. To keep up continuity, when this episode aired in syndicated re-runs, the mustache was explained to be a disguise for that particular case.

=== Season 1 (1983) ===
No. overall	No. in series	Title	Original release date	Prod. code
1	1	"Monster Lake"	September 5, 1983	080-101
In Scotland, Gadget searches for a missing scientist who vanished near Loch Ness that is supposed to harbor a monster.
2	2	"Down on the Farm"	September 6, 1983	080-102
Gadget must stop a farm that Dr. Claw is using as a missile silo from launching a missile to destroy Metro City.
3	3	"Gadget at the Circus"	September 7, 1983	080-103
Gadget takes Penny and Brain to the circus which is crawling with M.A.D. agents who try to eliminate him.
4	4	"The Amazon"	September 8, 1983	080-104
Professor Von Slickstein, the scientist who installed Gadget's gadgets, has been kidnapped and brought to the deep Amazon jungle to build an army of Gadget-like robots for Dr. Claw.
5	5	"Health Spa"	September 9, 1983	080-105
After a tough mission, Gadget wins a free stay at a health spa for some needed time off. Penny is suspicious when she did not recall her uncle entering any contest, which proves true as Gadget is the only guest and the spa is staffed by M.A.D. agents attempting to assassinate Gadget through intensive exercise and other traps.
6	6	"The Boat"	September 12, 1983	080-106
Gadget is assigned to board a cruise ship to prevent Dr. Claw from stealing millions of dollars' worth of exotic jewellery worn by some of the wealthiest people in the world.
7	7	"Haunted Castle"	September 13, 1983	080-107
While searching for a crime fighters' convention in Transylvania, Gadget takes a wrong turn and ends up at Dr. Claw's booby trapped castle, and gets greeted by the phony movie monsters that are M.A.D. agents disguised as a mock of Universal Monsters.
8	8	"Race to the Finish"	September 14, 1983	080-108
Dr. Claw enters a local auto racing event (just like the Indianapolis 500), which he intends to win by having his M.A.D. henchmen sabotage all the other racers, including Gadget.
9	9	"The Ruby"	September 15, 1983	080-109
Gadget goes to India to recover a priceless ruby that Dr. Claw plans to use in a powerful laser.
10	10	"A Star is Lost"	September 16, 1983	080-110
Gadget is assigned to guard Rick Rocker, a famous musician and Penny's favorite singer, whom Dr. Claw plans to kidnap and use to record mind-controlling music in his next album.
11	11	"All That Glitters"	September 19, 1983	080-111
Gadget is assigned to find El Dorado, (a.k.a. the "Lost City of Gold"), before Dr. Claw's agent, an English archaeologist, does.
12	12	"Movie Set"	September 20, 1983	080-112
Gadget falls for pretty actress Lana Lamore, unaware that she's a M.A.D. agent and that Dr. Claw is using the movie set as cover to film a secret military base.
13	13	"Amusement Park"	September 21, 1983	080-113
Dr. Claw has hidden a bomb somewhere in Metro City's amusement park, hoping for ransom.
14	14	"Art Heist"	September 22, 1983	080-114
When Chief Quimby learns Dr. Claw is attempting to loot the Museum of Modern Art, he sends Gadget to New York City to thwart this. Penny learns Dr. Claw is trying to fool everyone into thinking there never was an art robbery in the first place; by replacing the stolen art with counterfeits.
15	15	"Volcano Island"	September 23, 1983	080-115
Gadget must foil Dr. Claw's plan to erupt a volcano on a resort island in order to scare off holidaymakers, so he can use the island as a missile base.
16	16	"The Invasion"	September 26, 1983	080-116
Based on War of the Worlds, extraterrestrials land and Metro City is evacuated. It turns out these "aliens" are in actuality disguised M.A.D. agents, who have a field day robbing unguarded banks and other businesses.
17	17	"The Infiltration"	September 27, 1983	080-117
Gadget must stop M.A.D. master impersonator, Presto Change-O, from infiltrating a top-secret police conference on M.A.D. in London.
18	18	"The Curse of The Pharaoh"	September 28, 1983	080-118
Gadget must stop M.A.D. agents from stealing the treasure (especially the sarcophagus) of an Egyptian Pharaoh.
19	19	"M.A.D Trap"	September 29, 1983	080-119
A M.A.D. Agent, codenamed "The Rat", uses a chain of petty crimes to lure Gadget to a steel foundry where he plans to finish Gadget off for good.
20	20	"Basic Training"	September 30, 1983	080-120
Gadget is assigned to protect a train load of computer parts from Dr. Claw and a M.A.D. agent who is posing as a train conductor.
21	21	"Sleeping Gas"	October 3, 1983	080-121
Gadget must go to a group of Southern Pacific Islands to foil Dr. Claw's plan to knock entire cities out with sleeping gas.
22	22	"Gadget's Replacement"	October 4, 1983	080-122
Gadget loses his job when Chief Quimby replaces him with the high-tech Crime Computer that is secretly under Dr. Claw's control.
23	23	"Greenfinger"	October 5, 1983	080-123
Gadget is assigned to protect Professor Greenfinger who has made a super plant-growth formula, but M.A.D. has already kidnapped him and replaced him with an agent.
24	24	"Gadget Goes West"	October 6, 1983	080-124
Gadget goes to a western tourist town to stop the M.A.D. agent outlaw Rattlesnake Bart.
25	25	"Launch Time"	October 7, 1983	080-125
Gadget must foil Dr. Claw's plans to sabotage a Space Shuttle launch being sent up to repair a damaged satellite.
26	26	"Photo Safari"	October 10, 1983	080-126
Gadget goes to Africa to stop Dr. Claw and his M.A.D. agent Jungle Bob from establishing a crime base in the jungle.
27	27	"Coo-Coo Clock Caper"	October 11, 1983	080-127
Gadget goes to Switzerland to search for stolen gold, but Dr. Claw sends the insane Clockmaker to sabotage Gadget by having his gadgets malfunction every hour on the hour.
28	28	"The Bermuda Triangle"	October 12, 1983	080-128
Dr. Claw uses the supernatural aspects of the Bermuda Triangle as subterfuge to steal oil tankers, then empty them in order to sell crude oil on the black market.
29	29	"The Japanese Connection"	October 13, 1983	080-129
Dr. Claw teams up with his sinister Asian counterpart Iji-Waruta-san in Japan, to use the high-tech "Pip-1" computer chip, of which Dr. Claw has already stolen, to power Waruta's "Fuji Ray".
30	30	"Arabian Nights"	October 14, 1983	080-130
Gadget goes to the oil-rich country Yetzanistan in the Middle East to safeguard a sacred sword that Dr. Claw plans to steal to gain control of the country.
31	31	"Clear Case"	October 17, 1983	080-131
Gadget must stop Dr. Claw, who has been terrorizing workers at a diamond mine in South Africa with invisibility suits, making them think they are ghosts.
32	32	"Dutch Treat"	October 18, 1983	080-132
Gadget goes to the Netherlands to foil Dr. Claw's plot of smuggling diamonds in chocolate bars.
33	33	"The Great Divide"	October 19, 1983	080-133
Gadget goes to the Rocky Mountains in search of a prominent seismologist who has created an earthquake machine that Dr. Claw plans to use.
34	34	"Eye of the Dragon"	October 20, 1983	080-134
Gadget goes to Hong Kong to recover a priceless pearl necklace that Dr. Claw plans to use to forge a powerful alliance with the Asian crime lord Mr. Chow.
35	35	"Doubled Agent"	October 21, 1983	080-135
Dr. Claw sends a robot double of Gadget on a citywide crime spree in order to frame and imprison the real Gadget and then kidnap the Shah of Freeland, whom the real Gadget has been assigned to protect, for a hefty ransom.
36	36	"Plantform of the Opera"	October 24, 1983	080-136
In Rome, Dr. Claw secretly tunnels under the floor of an opera house into a bank vault next door and uses an unusual plant that, when it's exposed to light, can generate sound waves that are capable of melting metal.
37	37	"Don't Hold Your Breath"	October 25, 1983	080-137
Dr. Claw captures a trio of government oceanographers and holds them captive in his underwater base, from which he plans to launch a spy satellite.
38	38	"Gone Went the Wind"	October 26, 1983	080-138
Gadget goes to the North Pole to stop the M.A.D. agent Dr. Focus from using his "Sneezeooka" windstorm weapon to destroy Metro City.
39	39	"King Wrong"	October 27, 1983	080-139
In the midst of a revolution in Pianostan, Gadget is assigned to protect an unhappy king who bears a striking resemblance to him. Unknown to Gadget at first, Dr. Claw has been instigating the revolution from within.
40	40	"Pirate Island"	October 28, 1983	080-140
Gadget is on vacation on a cruise in the Caribbean, unbeknownst that the cruise ship is staffed by M.A.D. agents who then ally with the notorious pirate Pegleg Peg, who plot to sink the ship then threaten the billionaires unless they sign over their assets to M.A.D.
41	41	"M.A.D. Academy"	October 31, 1983	080-141
Dr. Claw training some newly-recruited agents in his M.A.D. Academy by assigning them to eliminate Gadget who has arrived there after mistaking it for the police academy.
42	42	"No Flies on Us"	November 1, 1983	080-142
In Malaysia, Gadget, while suffering a head cold, must stop the spread of a fly-borne disease developed by the "Wild Man of Borneo" (a M.A.D. agent).
43	43	"Luck of the Irish"	November 2, 1983	080-143
Gadget goes to Ireland to find the Blarney Stone, the national treasure, which has been stolen by Dr. Claw and his two Leprechaunish agents.
44	44	"Prince of the Gypsies"	November 3, 1983	080-144
Dr. Claw has stolen Romanovia's Royal Coat of Arms and has the blame put on a group of innocent Gypsies.
45	45	"Old Man of the Mountain"	November 4, 1983	080-145
Gadget goes to the Balkan states to stop the battle between a group of men and women who possess super-strength, while Dr. Claw tries to get his hands on the group's goat, whose magic yoghurt is the source of their powers of strength and eternal youth.
46	46	"The Emerald Duck"	November 7, 1983	080-146
Gadget goes to Mexico to locate a Mayan artifact called "The Emerald Duck", which is said to trigger an ancient solar weapon, before Dr. Claw can use it for evil. Earlier, the Emerald Duck was stolen by a bandito known as "Macho Miguel" (who is accompanied by his own marichi band) whenever he boasts of his name, and Gadget must track down the thief.
47	47	"Do Unto Udders"	November 8, 1983	080-147
Dr. Claw transmits waves from a satellite that causes cows at Metro Dairy and other dairy farms to stop producing milk. With the dairy competition sabotaged, customers can only buy products from New Foods, a M.A.D. front business, at exorbitant prices.
48	48	"Did You Myth Me?"	November 9, 1983	080-148
Gadget goes to Greece to protect a new Greek history museum from M.A.D. while Dr. Claw enlists an evil scientist, Dr. Daedalus, to retrieve a formula to turn lead into gold.
49	49	"A Bad Altitude"	November 10, 1983	080-149
Dr. Claw plans to sink a tropical island and eliminate competition by making his mountaintop resort the only one left.
50	50	"Funny Money"	November 11, 1983	080-150
Dr. Claw busts three counterfeiters out of prison so that they can make bogus money to fund M.A.D.'s criminal operations.
51	51	"Follow That Jet"	November 14, 1983	080-151
Dr. Claw uses a mind-controlling video game to hypnotize military pilots into stealing their fighter jets and joining his own M.A.D. Air Force. Dr. Claw nearly gets a chance to hypnotize Gadget as well, but in a rare moment of competence, Gadget says he ought not be distracted while on duty.
52	52	"Dry Spell"	November 15, 1983	080-152
A M.A.D. agent and his Trolls cause a drought in Metro City by sabotaging the water supply and selling "M.A.D. water" at an outrageous cost.
53	53	"Smeldorado"	November 16, 1983	080-153
Three M.A.D. agents infiltrate the gold vault at Fort Bricks and spray all of the gold with a formula that makes it stink, rendering it worthless.
54	54	"Quimby Exchange"	November 17, 1983	080-154
Gadget is assigned to protect a defected M.A.D. agent: Nervous Nick Defecto. As revenge, Dr. Claw kidnaps Chief Quimby and Gadget must save him with the help of the cowardly agent.
55	55	"Weather in Tibet"	November 18, 1983	080-155
Gadget is sent to Tibet to destroy a M.A.D. weather-controlling machine, which Dr. Claw plans to use to start storms all over the world.
56	56	"Unhenged"	November 21, 1983	080-156
M.A.D agents disguised as druids kidnap a group of solar energy scientists and force them to build a heat ray weapon at Stonehenge, which they plan to use to destroy the Tower of London, and hold London for ransom.
57	57	"Snakin' All Over"	November 22, 1983	080-157
Gadget is called to guard a priceless coin collection, but a M.A.D. agent by the name of Professor Venom uses his trained snakes to steal them.
58	58	"In Seine"	November 23, 1983	080-158
Gadget goes to Paris to stop the French M.A.D. agent LaPoof, who uses a robot to steal from the rich and famous.
59	59	"Tree Guesses"	November 24, 1983	080-159
Gadget must stop Dr. Claw who has concocted a wood-destroying chemical that he threatens to unleash on the world's forests.
60	60	"Birds of a Feather"	November 25, 1983	080-160
Gadget is sent to Turkey to guard a priceless jewel, but a M.A.D. agent uses his flock of trained birds to steal it for Dr. Claw.
61	61	"So It is Written"	November 28, 1983	080-161
Gadget visits a North African country where the locals believe he is the one a prophecy says will find an ancient treasure. Dr. Claw and his agent posing as a journalist covertly plan for Gadget to lead them there before letting the locals eliminate him while they steal the treasure.
62	62	"Fang the Wonder Dog"	November 29, 1983	080-162
Dr. Claw kidnaps the movie-star dog "Fang" and holds him for ransom.
63	63	"School for Pickpockets"	November 30, 1983	080-163
M.A.D. pickpockets try to steal Gadget's top-secret gadget watch while he is on vacation in Nice.
64	64	"Quizz Master"	December 1, 1983	080-164
Gadget investigates a TV quiz show where contestants are hypnotized into robbing Armored cars and unwittingly becomes hypnotized himself while trying to win a new toaster.
65	65	"Gadget in Winterland"	December 2, 1983	080-165
NOTE: This was a re-worked version of the pilot episode. Some of the dialogue was re-dubbed to address the purpose of Gadget's mustache, and the standard season 1 opening and ending credits were used.

=== Season 2 (1985) ===
In 1985, Inspector Gadget was revived for a second season after a one-year hiatus.

No. overall	No. in series	Title	Written by	Original release date	Prod. code
66	1	"Gadget in Minimadness"	Jack Hanrahan	September 30, 1985	33007
Five little Gremlin-like creatures called the Linguinis try to do Gadget in. They are all masters of disguise so it is difficult for Gadget to notice them.
67	2	"The Incredible Shrinking Gadget"	Jack Hanrahan	October 1, 1985	33008
M.A.D. agent Dr. Dummkopf creates a shrink ray with plans to reduce Gadget to the size of an insect.
68	3	"Gadget Meets the Grappler"	Jack Hanrahan	October 2, 1985	33009
Dr. Dummkopf returns and sends a dim-witted strongman thug to deal with Gadget.
69	4	"Focus on Gadget"	Eleanor Burian-Mohr and Glen Egbert	October 7, 1985	33013
Gadget uncovers Dr. Claw's plot to take over an orbital space station equipped with a heat ray capable of evaporating the Earth's water.
70	5	"Mad in the Moon"	Eleanor Burian-Mohr and Glen Egbert	October 8, 1985	33014
Gadget must foil Dr. Claw's plan to carve the M.A.D. logo into the moon.
71	6	"N.S.F. Gadget"	Eleanor Burian-Mohr and Glen Egbert	October 9, 1985	33015
Dr. Claw sabotages a satellite so that he can electronically steal from any bank account in the world.
72	7	"Magic Gadget"	Eleanor Burian-Mohr and Glen Egbert	October 14, 1985	33001
The famous magician and M.A.D. operative "The Great Wambini" holds a Metro City magic show with the elimination of Gadget as the grand finale.
73	8	"The Great Wambini's Seance"	Eleanor Burian-Mohr and Glen Egbert	October 15, 1985	33002
All the pets in Metro City are being kidnapped and Dr. Claw is the likely culprit.
74	9	"Wambini Predicts"	Eleanor Burian-Mohr and Glen Egbert	October 16, 1985	33003
The Great Wambini goes to Alpacastan to impress the king with his predictions in hopes the monarch will eventually hand over his famous diamond-spitting llama.
75	10	"Bad Dreams Are Made of This"	Eleanor Burian-Mohr and Glen Egbert	October 21, 1985	33010
M.A.D. inventor Dr. Spectrum has created a nightmare machine that keeps Metro City's citizens up all night and too tired to function during the day. Hector and Wordsworth from The Catillac Cats of Heathcliff make cameo appearances.
76	11	"Ghost Catchers"	Eleanor Burian-Mohr and Glen Egbert	October 22, 1985	33011
M.A.D. scientist Dr. Spectrum creates phony hauntings in hopes rich people will hand over lots of money to get rid of the ghosts.
77	12	"Busy Signal"	Eleanor Burian-Mohr and Glen Egbert	October 23, 1985	33012
Dr. Spectrum returns with a dematerializing beam that teleports riches stolen from Metro City's wealthy right to Dr. Claw's lair over telephone lines.
78	13	"The Capeman Cometh"	Mike O'Mahoney	October 28, 1985	33004
Corporal Capeman makes his debut, as he helps Inspector Gadget defeat a ninja who tries to steal gold and eliminate Gadget.
79	14	"Crashcourse in Crime"	Jack Hanrahan	October 29, 1985	33005
The agents of M.A.D. celebrate their 8th anniversary with a crime spree.
80	15	"Gadget's Gadgets"	Jack Hanrahan	October 30, 1985	33006
Inspector Gadget and Capeman are taken to a fake clinic run by Dr. Claw (head of M.A.D.) who claims they are going to tune up Gadget's gadgets, but are actually plotting to remove them.
81	16	"Tyrannosaurus Gadget"	Eleanor Burian-Mohr and Glen Egbert	November 4, 1985	33016
A M.A.D. agent devises a plot to bring dinosaurs back into the 20th century so Dr. Claw can crush Metro City, while at the same time killing Gadget's ancestors to ensure he never exists in the present.
82	17	"Gadget's Roma"	Eleanor Burian-Mohr and Glen Egbert	November 5, 1985	33017
Gadget time travels to ancient Rome to foil Dr. Claw's plot of stealing the city's treasures.
83	18	"Gadget's Clean Sweep"	Eleanor Burian-Mohr and Glen Egbert	November 6, 1985	33018
Dr. Claw travels back in time to 19th-century London to eliminate Gadget's chimney-sweeping ancestors and to steal the Queen's jeweled crown.
84	19	"Gadget Meets the Clan"	Jack Hanrahan	November 11, 1985	33019
Dr. Claw hires a wheelchair-using crime boss, The "Great Great Godfather", to eliminate Gadget.
85	20	"Gadget and Old Lace"	Eleanor Burian-Mohr	November 12, 1985	33020
Dr. Claw seeks the wise advice of his mentor in destroying Gadget and winds up with two Black Widows who believe assassinating Gadget would be their cup of tea.
86	21	"Gadget and the Red Rose"	Jack Hanrahan and Eleanor Burian-Mohr	November 13, 1985	33021
Dr. Claw brings gangster Spuds Malone out of retirement to eliminate Gadget with his infamous potato-firing tommy gun "Red Rose".

== See also ==
- List of Inspector Gadget (2015 TV series) episodes
