= Inspector Gadget Saves Christmas =

1992 Christmas TV Special

- Based on: Inspector Gadget by Andy Heyward; Jean Chalopin; Bruno Bianchi
- Written by: Jack Hanrahan; Eleanor Burian-Mohr
- Directed by: Chuck Patton
- Starring: Don Adams; Frank Welker; Maurice LaMarche; Erica Horn
- Music by: Randy Petersen; James McDonnell
- Country of origin: United States
- Original language: English

Production
- Executive producer: Andy Heyward
- Producer: Chuck Patton
- Running time: 22 minutes
- Production company: DIC Animation City

Original release
- Network: NBC
- Release: December 4, 1992

Inspector Gadget Saves Christmas is an American Christmas television special, featuring characters from the animated series Inspector Gadget. The special was produced by DIC Animation City, and aired on NBC on December 4, 1992. The special serves as a series finale for the original TV series.

== Synopsis ==
The film begins at the North Pole, Santa Claus and his little elves are working on all the toys that Santa Claus will deliver at Christmastime. When Doctor Claw has managed to sneak into the toy factory and disguise himself as Santa Claus. He has also managed to install mind-control devices on all the little elves, which he then activates, and orders them to capture Santa Claus. His plan is to use the mind-controlled little elves to make defective toys, for which the world will blame Santa Claus Meanwhile, he orders his M.A.D. agents to destroy Gadget. Several attempts are made in the opening credits, all of which fail.

Meanwhile, Inspector Gadget goes about his Christmas activities, unaware that MAD agents are attempting to eliminate him. Later, he visits a mall Santa Claus, who is actually Chief Frank Quimby in disguise. The Chief provides Gadget with a self-destructing message outlining his mission.

Meanwhile, Inspector Gadget, along with Penny and Brain, heads off to the North Pole, taking with him the assumption that Doctor Claw has not made his move yet. Upon entering the factory, Gadget believes there is nothing wrong. He does not get suspicious when he is staring the disguised Doctor Claw in the face. Penny and Brain, on the other hand, are not fooled. But when they try to tell Inspector Gadget about it, he is sideswiped by a claw from the toy factory and thrown onto the conveyor belt with all the bad toys the little elves are manufacturing where Inspector Gadget sings a parody of "The Twelve Days of Christmas" using the things he winds up crashing into. When this does not finish him off (thanks to Brain), Doctor Claw instead has Inspector Gadget dropped down the manhole he dropped Santa Claus through at the beginning. There, Inspector Gadget comes upon the real Santa Claus, but arrests him, thinking this Santa Claus is the fraud.

Meanwhile, Penny is snooping around the whole factory and hides herself in a giant jack-in-the-box. Penny saw Santa’s elves destroying all of the toys. Penny calls Brain to tell him that Doctor Claw plans to ruin Christmas. Brain then reports that Santa’s elves tried to eliminate Gadget, he found the real Santa and accused him of being Doctor Claw. However, the little elves find Penny and trap her in the jack-in-the-box. Penny calls Brain to tell him that she will escape somehow and he has to save Inspector Gadget.

Brain manages to snatch the keys away from Doctor Claw and open the cell where Inspector Gadget has been interrogating Santa Claus using lines of The Night Before Christmas for reference. Inspector Gadget mistakes Brain for "The Fake Santa's" Accomplice, lassos the both of them and heads off to tell the real Santa Claus he has caught the criminals. Meanwhile, Penny uses her computer book to find out how Santa’s elves are being mind controlled. Penny manages to escape and she finds herself where Doctor Claw hid Santa's real toys.

As Inspector Gadget helps the disguised Doctor Claw load the broken toys onto the sleigh, Brain springs himself and the real Santa Claus loose, and then follows Penny to the control room that Doctor Claw has left vacant. Penny deactivates the mind control on Santa’s elves, but Doctor Claw quickly gets into his jet plane and prepares to take off with the sleigh full of broken toys. But the real Santa Claus shows up with his reindeer and foils him by unhooking the sleigh from the M.A.D. Jet. Then for good measure, Gadget, still not realizing he has been helping Doctor Claw, ties the hook to a candy cane prop. Then the reindeer break up the ice behind the M.A.D. Jet, sending him drifting into the distance. After the Chief makes an appearance to congratulate Inspector Gadget and company for saving Christmas, Santa Claus gives them a ride in his sleigh.

== Voice cast ==
- Don Adams - Inspector Gadget (speaking voice)
- Frank Welker - Brain, Dr. Claw, M.A.D Cat, and Santa Claus
- Maurice LaMarche - Chief Quimby, and Inspector Gadget (singing voice)
- Erica Horn - Penny

== Home media releases ==
The special was first released on VHS in 1993 by Buena Vista Home Video. The VHS was re-released on October 16, 2001, by Lions Gate Home Entertainment through the DIC Home Entertainment label.

The special was released on DVD for the first time by Sterling Entertainment in 2004. Three episodes of the original Inspector Gadget series, "The Weather in Tibet", "So It is Written" and "Birds of a Feather" were also included. The special was re-released on DVD again by New Video in 2013 without the bonus episodes.

== See also ==
- Inspector Gadget (1983 TV series) (animated series)
- Inspector Gadget spinoff incarnations
