= Inspector Gadget (2015 TV series) =

2010s animated television series

- Also known as: Inspector Gadget 2.0
- Genre: Action; Adventure; Comedy; Science fiction
- Created by: Eric Lewald; Julia Lewald
- Based on: Inspector Gadget by: Bruno Bianchi; Jean Chalopin; Andy Heyward
- Voices of: Ivan Sherry; Tara Strong; Derek McGrath; Scott McCord; Martin Roach; Lyon Smith; Katie Griffin
- Theme music composer: Asher Lenz; Stephen Skratt
- Opening theme: "Inspector Gadget"
- Ending theme: "Inspector Gadget" (instrumental)
- Composers: Asher Lenz; Stephen Skratt
- Countries of origin: United States; Canada; France
- Original language: English
- No. of seasons: 2
- No. of episodes: 52 (104 segments) (list of episodes)

Production
- Executive producers: Steven DeNure; Michael Hirsh (S1); Mark Gosine; Anne Loi; Ken Faier (S2); Ace Fipke (S2); Kirsten Newlands (S2)
- Producer: Phillip Stamp
- Cinematography: Richard Purcell
- Editors: Christopher Fost; Warren Jefferies (S2); Fabien Melanson (S2); Brian Culliton (S2)
- Running time: 22 minutes (11 minutes per segment)
- Production company: DHX Media (Note: As DHX-Inspector Gadget Productions Inc. or DHX-Inspector Gadget Productions II Inc.)

Original release
- Network: Teletoon (S1); Family Channel (S2)
- Release: March 27, 2015 – March 16, 2018

Related
- Inspector Gadget (original series); Gadget & the Gadgetinis

Inspector Gadget (also known as Inspector Gadget 2.0) is a American-Canadian-French animated television series produced by DHX Media that serves as the reboot and second sequel to the original series of the same name (following Gadget & the Gadgetinis), which aired from 1983 to 1985. As with the original, the series continues the adventures of the incompetent and clueless bionic police detective equipped with a series of bionic gadgets that he uses for missions to stop the evil Dr. Claw and his organization M.A.D., both of which were revived by Claw's nephew Talon. This time, Penny and Brain physically join Gadget on his missions to stop the duo.

The show debuted on September 7, 2015, on Teletoon; although the series made its global debut on Boomerang in France on January 3, 2015. In the United States, it premiered as a streaming series on Netflix on March 27, 2015.

This is the first ever Inspector Gadget series to be animated in full CGI since Inspector Gadget's Biggest Caper Ever.

== Premise ==
Serving as a continuation of the original series and set five years after it, when Dr. Claw is thawed out of his iceberg prison and reactivates M.A.D., Inspector Gadget is brought out of retirement and is back on the beat to stop Dr. Claw once again. This time, Penny and Brain officially work by Gadget's side. The series also introduces a new character in Dr. Claw's nephew, Talon. The series' tone is more comical than the original, with Dr. Claw being portrayed as much less sinister.

== Characters ==
=== HQ ===
- Inspector Gadget (voiced by Ivan Sherry impersonating Don Adams) is still the same powerful but unintelligent, gullible, and incompetent cyborg he was in the original series, but is now accompanied by Penny on his missions. As always, he's the bumbling "hero", only inadvertently saves the day and typically leaving a path of destruction in doing so. While he loves his niece, he still generally doesn't listen to Penny, even though she's his new partner. Gadget is noticeably more egotistical than he was in the original series. He also has a new Gadget Mobile (since the old one turned to scrap after he repeatedly jinxed its condition), which is snug and more efficient than the previous one.
- Penny (voiced by Tara Strong) is Inspector Gadget's niece, an agent in training. She is brave, clever and willing to fight villains. She has a crush on Talon, Dr. Claw's nephew. Despite her crush, she never lets him get away with his and his uncle's evil plans. Unlike other Inspector Gadget productions, she now joins Gadget in his assignments and despite the show's title, she is effectively the protagonist. Also unlike the '80s series, she is a relatively adept fighter, only seldom getting caught by M.A.D. agents. Penny is still typically the one who really saves the day but never gets any recognition for it, generally happy to let her uncle take all the credit for completing the mission. Penny acts like a normal teenage girl when she's not on duty. Her computer book and watch have been replaced with a holographic tablet called the codex. Her middle name is Ruth.
- Brain (vocal effects provided by Scott McCord) is Penny's dog, best friend, and sidekick, and still always accompanies her to every mission. As always, he is a master of disguise and usually Gadget mistakes him for a M.A.D. Agent and tries to apprehend him (even when Brain is attempting to save him or when Penny tries to tell him it is really Brain).
- Chief Frank Quimby (voiced by Derek McGrath) is the leader of the HQ and always gives Gadget and Penny their missions. To manage this, he always appears at the strangest places. This time, instead of paper, his self-destructing messages are now holographic, although in some episodes he will return to using paper due to certain circumstances. Chief Quimby now wears glasses and a coat and his hair is blonde instead of brown. He is a lot more patient than he was in previous literations of the show.
- Professor Von Slickstein (voiced by Scott McCord) is an HQ scientist is portrayed as a young man, rather than a man in his late 60's in the original series. He wears glasses and specializes in fashion-related inventions.
- Kayla (voiced by Katie Griffin) is Penny's best friend, another new character and a fellow agent-in-training. Her cheerful and positive personality is only matched by her gift for being a blabbermouth; her motor mouth is strong enough to cripple even the toughest M.A.D. goon.

=== M.A.D. ===
- Dr. Irving Thelonious Claw, Jr. (voiced by Martin Roach) wants to take over the world and destroy Gadget. This time, he has help from his nephew Talon who rescued him from his iceberg prison in the first episode. As always, his face is never shown (but his torso does appear now and then).
  - M.A.D. Cat - Unlike Dr. Claw's previous M.A.D. Cats, this one is female. She is spoiled by Dr. Claw and shares a feud with Talon. M.A.D. Cat would often do plans of her own with little success.
- Talon (voiced by Lyon Smith) is Dr. Claw's evil nephew who rescued him in the first episode. He is clever and manipulative. Talon is aware of his handsomeness and knows how to apply it. He secretly has a crush on Penny, and as the feeling is reciprocated, they cannot be together because they are enemies. In each possible situation that Talon wants to impress Penny, she mostly ignores him. Talon is one of a very small handful of M.A.D. agents who is aware that it is generally Penny, not Gadget, who foils M.A.D.'s plots. Even his uncle is oblivious to this fact. Talon is always arguing with his uncle because he considers his uncle's plans to be rather old-fashioned (although there is really nothing wrong with that) or just ridiculous, which is true. His uncle always blames him when his plans fail, even when it is not Talon's fault. There are even situations when Dr. Claw blames Talon for something his nephew has warned him of. Although he does everything to impress his uncle, Talon isn't treated very well by him.
- Mama Claw (voiced by Martin Roach) is Dr. Claw's mother and Talon's grandmother. From her constant nagging, she often embarrasses her son because Dr. Claw is taking orders from someone who is not him and often tries to get Dr. Claw and Talon to improve themselves. Mama Claw appeared in a few episodes. Like Dr. Claw, her face is never seen, but the back of her head hair and ears do appear now and then.
- M.A.D. Henchmen (various voices) are the generic henchmen of M.A.D.

==== M.A.D. Agents ====
- MADthew Strong (voiced by Cory Doran) is a construction worker.
- Commander MADhail (voiced by Cory Doran) is a Russian astronaut.
- Corsetta Camisole (voiced by Alyson Court) is a mistress of disguise who dresses fashionably.
- Detective Data (voiced by Alyson Court) is a former HQ operative. The reason why she started working for M.A.D. is because Gadget took credit for all her hard work which Chief praises him for despite Data's claims that she did the work.
- Malicious (voiced by Alyson Court) is Penny's secret friend who attends "Evil University." She enjoys medieval torture and weapons due to that they have the word "Evil." Also, Malicious has a huge crush on Talon.
- MAD Weed Wacko (voiced by Robert Tinkler) really hates plants so much more worst and even poison ivy.
- Cheekster (voiced by Robert Tinkler) is the mad wrestler.
- Little Old Lady first appeared in "Gadget Management" as part of a simulation where she said "M.A.D. Forever" using her cane to shoot.
- Mac Macintosh (voiced by Scott McCord) is an evil farmer in an apple costume.
- Mayor (voiced by Cory Doran) is an unnamed evil mayor.
- MADalena (voiced by Stacey DePass) is a M.A.D. Agent who once opened a resort near the Slopsquatch habitat.
- Cuckoo Clockmaker (voiced by Ron Pardo) is a man who's obsessively tinkering with clocks and doing the job "on Time." He also hates to work with Talon.
- Jacques Crankcase (voiced by Cory Doran) is a no-good cheating racer who will stop at nothing to win.
- MADtana Dan (voiced by Scott McCord) is an impetuous explorer and treasure hunter who steals priceless treasures for M.A.D.'s plots. Unlike the other M.A.D. Agents, MADtana Dan is never comfortable working with Talon.
- MADgician (voiced by Ron Pardo) is a magician who was once Gadget's assistant for birthday parties. But from all the humiliation Gadget gave him, he wants him to "disappear."
- MADison Von Trapp (voiced by Julie Lemieux) is Dr. Claw's best huntress with a metallic eagle. She is equipped with an invention called "The Cross-Boa" which is a crossbow with a robot snake.
- Sue Donym (voiced by Denise Oliver) is M.A.D.'s top spy who uses an attaching truth spray.
  - Brawn - Sue Donym's shifty dog.

=== Other ===
- Baron von Steeltoe (voiced by Cory Doran) is a Scottish villain in metal boots who is Dr. Claw's rival.
- Dr. Ithica Marvins (voiced by Julie Lemieux) is HQ's greatest female archaeologist. Though every time she discovered something remarkable, she instantly gets captured or trapped.
- Nigel Saint De' Le-peppertone IV Esquire III (voiced by Robert Tinkler) - International pop star whistler. He first appeared in "Rock Out" then made cameos in some episodes.
- Sir Owen Barnstormer (voiced by Adrian Truss) is a billionaire who creates inventions like an animal nursery blimp and a train without the aid of tracks.

== Episodes ==
| Season | Episodes | Originally released | |
| Season | Episodes | First released | Last released |
|---|---|---|---|
| 1 | 26 | September 7, 2015 (Teletoon); March 27, 2015 (Netflix) | February 15, 2016 (Teletoon); August 29, 2015 (Netflix) |
| 2 | 26 | June 2, 2017 | March 16, 2018 |

== Production ==
The first public mention of a new Inspector Gadget series was on January 26, 2012, when Ray Sharma, the CEO of game developer XMG Studio said that the success of Inspector Gadget: M.A.D. Dash had "reinvigorated the TV brand with a new TV series in production". The series was announced by Cookie Jar on October 2 that year with Teletoon as its Canadian broadcast partner. Michael Hirsh, the CEO of Cookie Jar said in the press release that they were looking to distribute the series worldwide (unlike the previous TV series, Gadget & the Gadgetinis, which never aired in America).

On June 9, 2013, Teletoon officially announced the series and revealed the first images of the title character's new design. On July 1, Jean Chalopin talked about how the reboot came to be, and how the television landscape had changed since the 1980s. The show was announced to have twenty-six episodes on June 11.

On October 8, 2015, Gadget's voice actor Ivan Sherry confirmed that they had started recording voices for a second season.

== Broadcast ==
On December 4, 2014, it was announced that Boomerang had acquired the Pay-TV rights to the series in most territories, including EMEA, Latin America and Asia Pacific. The series premiered on Boomerang in Australia on January 5, 2015. The show premiered on January 14 in the Middle East and Africa on the DStv network. The series premiered on Cartoon Network Arabia in the Middle East on March 6. The series premiered on Boomerang in the United Kingdom and Ireland on February 16.

In the United States, the show was originally intended to air on Cartoon Network. However, on February 26, 2015, it was announced that it would instead be released exclusively through Netflix on March 27, 2015, Both of the series on Netflix were split into two, giving four seasons overall. The show aired in the US on Universal Kids from 2017 to 2021. The series currently airs on Kids Street.

Beginning with the second season, the show would move to the DHX-owned Family Channel in Canada.

India's Pogo began airing the show on November 4, 2017.

== DVD releases ==
On March 7, 2025, TOPAZ Distribution released, for the first time on DVD in the United States, the complete series, which gathers the 52 episodes of the first and second season (104 episodes of 10 minutes).

In Australia, Universal released the first season in 4 individual DVDs that gather the 26 episodes (52 episodes of 10 minutes).

In France, the first season of the series was also released on DVD by France Televisions Distribution in a pack containing 4 DVDs.

== Games ==
Teletoon also produced five web games on its website:

1. Descent into MADNess
2. Go Go Gadget Jetpack
3. Talons Take Over
4. Go Go Gadget Mobile
5. Super Spy Gauntlet
