= Gadget & the Gadgetinis (video game) =

2004 video game

- Developer: Eko Software
- Publisher: Hip Games
- Composer: Pierre Lange
- Platforms: PlayStation 2, Windows
- Release: PlayStation 2: EU: November 5, 2004; AU: November 8, 2004; Windows: EU: November 8, 2004
- Genres: Action-adventure, beat 'em up, platform
- Mode: Single-player

Gadget & the Gadgetinis is a video game based on the television series of the same name, developed by French studio Eko Software. The game was released in 2004 for the PlayStation 2 and Windows.

== Gameplay ==
Gadget & the Gadgetinis is a third-person platform game. The player takes control of Gadget and gets to use a variety of abilities to get through the levels, with assistance from Penny. Some sections of each level include the Gadgetinis who offer help when required. The game also integrates puzzle elements.

== Plot ==
All over the world, people are becoming mad. The World Organization of Maintaining Peace (WOMP), where Inspector Gadget works, has discovered that it is due to a strange gas. WOMP suspects that the criminal organization MAD, led by the evil Dr. Claw, is behind the spread of the gas. The mission of Inspector Gadget is to locate and destroy the laboratories which produce the gas. Penny and the Gadgetinis help him in his mission to end Dr. Claw's evil plan.

== Development ==
Developed by Eko Software and published by Hip Games, who had acquired the Inspector Gadget video game license after acquiring Light & Shadow Production in February 2004. It was unveiled at E3 2004, following an announcement on May 5, 2004, only released in PAL regions, much like with Inspector Gadget: Mad Robots Invasion.

== Reception ==
Reception

Review score
Publication	Score
Jeuxvideo.com	8/20

Gadget & the Gadgetinis received mixed-to-negative reviews.

French website Jeuxvideo gave the PC version of the game a score of 8/20, stating the obvious short development cycle, while praising the game's graphics being faithful to the series but criticizing the camera controls making certain jumps tedious, the lack of variety in enemy types and environments. The soundtrack being marred by quickly repetitive music and occasional sound bugs. Despite those issues, the game maintaining a friendly atmosphere and that it should appeal to fans of the series.
