= Inspector Gadget 2 =

2003 film by Alex Zamm

- Official DVD cover
- Directed by: Alex Zamm
- Written by: Ron Anderson; William Robertson; Alex Zamm
- Based on: Inspector Gadget by Andy Heyward; Jean Chalopin; Bruno Bianchi
- Produced by: Charles Hirschhorn; Peter M. Green
- Starring: French Stewart; Elaine Hendrix; Tony Martin
- Cinematography: Geoffrey Wharton
- Edited by: Jimmy Hill
- Music by: Chris Hajian
- Production companies: Walt Disney Pictures; Fountain Productions
- Distributed by: Buena Vista Home Entertainment
- Release date: March 11, 2003
- Running time: 88 minutes
- Country: United States
- Language: English
- Budget: $12 million

Inspector Gadget 2 (sometimes called Inspector 2 Gadget and IG2) is a 2003 American superhero comedy film released direct-to-video on VHS and DVD on March 11, 2003, as a stand-alone sequel to the 1999 film Inspector Gadget. It was based on the 1983 cartoon series created by DIC Entertainment.

Unlike the first film (which has a serious and darker tone and received a PG rating), Inspector Gadget 2 received a G rating and is considered a more faithful adaptation of the original animated series; the characters' personalities were altered to more closely match those of their cartoon counterparts and Doctor Claw's face is never shown in full. Additionally, Gadget and Claw are never referred to as "John Brown" and "Sanford Scolex", their respective civilian names from the first film, although Claw's communicator is still labeled as "Scolex Industries" (Claw also mentions that his assets, including his "multi-million dollar high-rise evil headquarters", were confiscated by the police after his arrest in the first movie). Critics praised the cast and faithfulness to the source material but criticized the visual effects, writing, and humor. Some critics considered the film to be slightly better than the first.

None of the actors from the first film reprised their roles, with the exception of D. L. Hughley, who returned as the voice of the Gadgetmobile.

== Plot ==
Crime in Riverton has ceased ever since Dr. Claw was arrested and sent to prison, and Inspector Gadget and his Gadgetmobile are having problems in their line of work. This mostly because Gadget, out of boredom, is overreacting to and sending people to jail for unintentional and minor transgressions by them against the law. To make things worse, he has been having problems with glitches that cause the wrong gadget to be activated whenever he commands.

Tired of Gadget overfilling his jail unit for ridiculous reasons, Chief Quimby angrily puts Gadget on probation after his mother is charged for going slightly above the speed limit. At this time, Dr. Claw escapes from prison, seeking to exact revenge on Gadget for putting him in prison and to restart his multi-million-dollar empire. Mayor Wilson takes this opportunity to create and unveil an upgraded female Gadget-type robot, Gadget Model #2 (G2 for short), believing that the malfunctioning Gadget will soon be retired. Gadget begins to fall in love with G2, though she does not reciprocate as she prefers to work alone, viewing him as a nuisance, though she simultaneously appreciates his determination to fight crime.

Dr. Claw hatches a new plan to steal five trillion dollars' worth of gold from the Federal Reserve. Gadget repeatedly attempts to stop him, but is continually foiled by his own bumbling and gadgetry glitches, which allow Claw's henchmen, Brick and McKibble, and their three additional recruits (Squint, Jungle Bob, and The Ninja) to steal components for the scheme unnoticed; his antics also prevent G2 from stopping Claw. Dr. Claw’s minions steals ion fuel cells from the Consecrated Industries Warehouse. Things soon come to a head when, at a science convention, Claw's men install a circuit override chip on Gadget, allowing Claw to control him like a puppet and cause significant damage while his men steal a protoid laser. Even though it wasn't his fault, Quimby fires Gadget for the chaos. Gadget's niece, Penny Brown, offers to help, having desired to help her uncle with the case in spite of him being against it due to her age, but Gadget again refuses. Dejected at first, Penny quickly resolves to help him and solve the case herself, and she sets out to do so with the assistance of her pet dog, Brain.

Following several unsuccessful jobs, Gadget is hired as a parking valet at a fundraiser hosted by Wilson. Claw and his henchmen infiltrate and he activates a bowling pin containing laughing gas to distract the guests as he steals a 50,000-karat ruby before trapping G2, who is immune to the gas, with a magnet. Due to this, Wilson orders Quimby to deactivate G2 and terminate the Gadget program for good in order to distract the public from the police's incompetence in stopping Claw.

Meanwhile, Penny and Brain's investigation leads them to find and infiltrate Claw's hideout at the abandoned Bowl-Rite factory outside the city, but Penny is captured by Claw and his minions. Gadget ventures to Baxter's laboratory to reactivate G2, who realizes that Gadget truly cares for her. Brain, having escaped Claw's men, tells them through Baxter's bark-translating device that Claw has kidnapped Penny and has used the laser, ruby, and ion fuel cells to build a super-weapon. Upon realizing that Claw is based in the Bowl-Rite factory, Gadget finally connects the evidence Penny previously presented to him, and G2 agrees to help him save her and foil Claw's scheme.

The next day, Claw activates his machine, a laser that freezes time only in Riverton, allowing Claw and his henchmen to easily rob the Federal Reserve (planning on robbing other places with valuable items afterwards). The Gadgets manage to avoid the weapon's blast and confront the group there. Claw orders his recruits to attack the pair so that he, Brick, and McKibble can escape, G2 decides to switch chips with Gadget so that her can function perfectly; even in spite of the glitches, G2 successfully captures Claw's hired goons. Gadget pursues Claw, who drops Penny off the truck in a go-kart loaded with explosives. After he rescues her, both reunite with G2 and the Gadgetmobile. At a bridge, Gadget stops Claw's truck with a puddle of bubble gum. Brick and McKibble attempt to escape, but they get stuck in the puddle and are forced to surrender. However, Claw escapes in a rocket-like pod, vowing that he'll get Gadget "next time", but Penny and the Gadgets reverse the effects of the laser and unfreeze Riverton.

Wilson and Quimby congratulate the Gadgets for their heroic efforts, with Gadget, having been happily reinstated by Quimby, also giving credit to Penny, admitting that he is proud to have her as a partner, and awarding her a Junior Inspector Medal for her meritorious conduct. As Gadget and G2 share a kiss outside the city hall, fireworks emerge from Gadget's hat.

== Cast ==
- French Stewart as Inspector Gadget
- Elaine Hendrix as G2
- Caitlin Wachs as Penny
- Scooter and Riley as Brain
- Tony Martin as Dr. Claw
- Sigrid Thornton as Mayor Wilson
- Mark Mitchell as Chief Frank Quimby
- D. L. Hughley as Gadgetmobile (voice)
- John Batchelor as McKibble
- James Wardlaw as Brick
- Bruce Spence as Baxter
- Jeff Bennett as the vocal effects of Brain
- Nick Lawson as Squint
- Mick Roughan as Jungle Bob
- Siros Niaros as The Ninja
- Brian McDermott as Mr. Morgan
- Mungo McKay as the Bartender
- Alethea McGrath as Mrs. Quimby (cameo)

== Production ==
Principal photography began in November 2001; the film was shot entirely in and around Brisbane, Australia. Filming locations included the Queensland University of Technology Gardens Point Campus, Queensland Parliament House, University of Queensland St. Lucia Campus, South Bank Parklands Beach, Toowong Village, Anglican Church Grammar School, a factory in Holt Street Pinkenba and the William Jolly Bridge.

== Release ==
Inspector Gadget 2 was released on DVD and VHS on March 11, 2003, almost four years after its predecessor was released.

== Reception ==
Inspector Gadget 2 received mixed reviews, although more favorable than its predecessor. Rotten Tomatoes reported that 40% of critics have given the film a positive review based on five reviews, with an average rating of 4.4/10.

Joe Leydon of Variety gave the film a negative review. Radio Times gave the film a two out of five stars. Common Sense Media gave the film a three out of five stars, writing that the film has cartoonish violence.
