= DIC Movie Toons =

Animated film series

DIC Movie Toons (originally known as the Nickelodeon Sunday Movie Toons in the United States) were a series of animated television films produced by DIC Entertainment (Note: Globehunters was produced by Frederator Studios and Nickelodeon Animation Studios. It finished production in 2000 and was initially slated for a premiere date the same year. Viacom International owns all rights to the series.) for Nickelodeon. It started in 2002, beginning on October 6 and ending on December 29. MGM Home Entertainment released the films on home media.

Most films released under the label are owned by WildBrain, which holds the rights to most of DIC's library; exceptions include GlobeHunters, which was a Nickelodeon in-house production, owned currently by Viacom International.

== List of films ==
Initially, 39 films were ordered from Nickelodeon to air, with later productions including adaptations of concepts such as Black Beauty and The Wonderful Wizard of Oz, but only 13 of them did so. With the exception of Groove Squad, which was a completely original story (it was about a group of crime-fighting cheerleaders), all of the made-for-TV films were either based on various DIC productions such as Inspector Gadget, Sabrina: The Animated Series, and Dennis the Menace, or adapted from stories from classic literature such as Treasure Island and Twenty Thousand Leagues Under the Seas. In order, the films featured were:

1. Inspector Gadget's Last Case (based on both the original 1983 Inspector Gadget series and Disney's 1999 live-action movie, but with character designs from Gadget & the Gadgetinis) (10/6/02)
2. Sabrina: Friends Forever (based on Sabrina: The Animated Series) (10/13/2002)
3. Time Kid (based on The Time Machine by H. G. Wells) (10/20/02)
4. Dennis the Menace: Cruise Control (based on the 1986–1988 animated series version of Dennis the Menace) (10/27/02)
5. The Archies in JugMan (based on the Archie universe as portrayed in Archie's Weird Mysteries) (11/3/02)
6. Dinosaur Island (based on The Lost World by Sir Arthur Conan Doyle) (11/10/02)
7. My Fair Madeline (based on Madeline) (11/17/02)
8. Groove Squad (11/24/02)
9. Treasure Island (based on Treasure Island by Robert Louis Stevenson) (12/1/02)
10. Charles Dickens A Christmas Carol (based on A Christmas Carol by Charles Dickens) (12/8/02) (Note: Originally released on home video in 1997.)
11. Globehunters: An Around the World in 80 Days Adventure (based on Around the World in Eighty Days by Jules Verne) (12/15/02)
12. The Amazing Zorro (based on Johnston McCulley's Zorro) (12/22/02)
13. 20,000 Leagues Under the Sea (based on Twenty Thousand Leagues Under the Seas by Jules Verne) (12/29/02)

== International broadcasts ==
In October 2002, Disney Television International purchased the broadcast rights to the films for DIC to air on Disney Channel, Toon Disney and Playhouse Disney networks in France, Germany, Italy, Southeast Asia, United Kingdom, Ireland, Australia, New Zealand, Spain, Portugal, the Middle East and Scandinavia.

In November 2002, Super RTL purchased the German free-to-air broadcasting rights to the films as part of a six-year deal with DIC. Other networks like YTV in Canada, Cartoon Network Japan, Televisa in Mexico and RCTV in Venezuela purchased the broadcast rights to the movies in their respective regions.

Later on, DIC would pre-sell the films to ITV in the UK, RTL Club in Belgium, Mediatrade in Italy, Alter TV in Greece and Anteve in Indonesia.

== Home media ==
=== North America ===
All of the films apart from A Christmas Carol were later released to VHS and DVD in the United States by MGM Home Entertainment throughout 2003. MGM released the films in three phases and ended with two three-pack boxsets in October - one for boys and another for girls.

In 2005, Entertainment Resource acquired home media rights to the Movie Toons. On November 1, the company released double packs containing two films on one disc - The Archies in Jugman/Dennis the Menace: Cruise Control, Groove Squad/Sabrina: Friends Forever, The Amazing Zorro/Treasure Island, 20,000 Leagues Under the Sea/Time Kid, and Globehunters/Dinosaur Island. Inspector Gadget's Last Case and My Fair Madeline were originally intended to be released as single releases later on in the year, but such a release never occurred.

In 2008, Gaiam through GT Media re-released the films on DVD. The company released the films as single-disc and double-packs containing two movies on a single disc, and also released a "Gold Collection" that contained two discs with three movies on each.

In 2013, My Fair Madeline was re-released by Stepping Stones Entertainment.

=== International ===
In the United Kingdom, a selection of the films were distributed through Prism Leisure and later Boulevard Entertainment.

In Australia, Shock Entertainment's Kaleidoscope Film and DVD imprint released a majority of the Movie Toons on DVD (except for My Fair Madeline, Time Kid and Treasure Island). In 2010, Jigsaw Entertainment re-released Inspector Gadget's Last Case, Sabrina, Friends Forever!, The Archies in Jugman, Dennis the Menace: Cruise Control with Movie Toons branding. The company also released Inspector Gadget's Biggest Caper Ever! under the Movie Toons brand, although it was not officially part of it. Umbrella Entertainment released My Fair Madeline in 2010, and re-released it in 2013.

In France, TF1 Video released selected films including Sabrina, Friends Forever and Inspector Gadget's Last Case.

In Italy, Spain/Latin America, and Ukraine, the films were released by Eagle Pictures, Sum, and ICTV respectively.

In Poland, these films were dubbed and distributed by Kartunz.

== Notes and references ==
Notes
