= Archibald le Magi-chien =

French animated edutainment TV series

- Created by: Jean Chalopin
- Directed by: Bruno Bianchi
- Starring: Gérard Hernandez; Jackie Berger; Michel Vocoret; Guy Pierauld; Claude Rollet; Marie Martine; Albert Augier; Henri Labussière
- Countries of origin: Belgium; France
- Original language: French
- No. of episodes: 46

Production
- Production companies: DIC Audiovisuel; Stand'Art

Original release
- Network: TF1
- Release: 1980 – 1981

Archibald le Magichien (literally: Archibald the Magic Dog) is a French animated edutainment TV series that originally aired on TF1 from 1980 to 1981. The series consists of 46 five-minute episodes and was one of the earliest productions by DIC Audiovisuel (then known as DIC Entertainment), preceding Ulysses 31 by a year.

Ownership of the series passed to Disney in 2001 when Disney acquired Fox Kids Worldwide, which also includes Saban Entertainment libraries, which consists of the C&D/DIC Audiovisuel programs.

== Title ==
The title's last word, magichien, is a portmanteau combining the French words magie (magic) and chien (dog). This wordplay creates a pun on magicien (magician), reflecting the main character's magical abilities and canine transformation.

== Synopsis ==
The series follows Archibald, a magician who accidentally transforms himself into a Bearded Collie dog and is unable to recall the spell to revert to his human form. Throughout the series, he befriends a young boy named Pierrot and, despite his predicament, uses his magical skills and knowledge to educate Pierrot—and by extension, the audience—on essential health and hygiene habits.

== Educational themes ==
The series is aimed at teaching children valuable life lessons regarding personal health and well-being. The series addressed several key topics, including:

- The dangers of smoking and alcohol consumption.
- The risks of prolonged exposure to the sun.
- The importance of regular hygiene practices, such as brushing teeth, washing hands, and bathing.
- The benefits of physical exercise and maintaining an active lifestyle.
- The necessity of a balanced diet for overall health.

== Alternative titles ==
- נחשון (Nachshon) (Israeli title)
- De toverhond Archibald (Dutch title)
