= Inspector Gadget: Gadget's Crazy Maze =

2001 video game

- North American Boxart
- Developer: Vision Media Engineering
- Publishers: Ubi Soft; Light & Shadow Production
- Composer: Fabian Del Priore
- Platform: PlayStation
- Release: 2001
- Genre: Puzzle
- Mode: Single-player

Inspector Gadget: Gadget's Crazy Maze is a 2001 puzzle video game based on the television show of the same name.

== Plot ==
According to the story of Gadget's Crazy Maze, Inspector Gadget's mysterious nemesis is up to no good. This time, the M.A.D leader Dr. Claw has been creating mind-control crystals on his secret Moon base, then tossing them down to Earth. If the crystals lay dormant for a short amount of time, they will activate, taking control of the consciousness of the whole world. To make sure no one disturbs them, Dr. Claw has spread them all around four different areas and inserted his vile henchmen to protect them.
