= Gadget & the Gadgetinis =

2002 animated television series

- Genre: Comedy; Adventure
- Created by: Jean Chalopin
- Based on: Inspector Gadget by Bruno Bianchi; Andy Heyward; Jean Chalopin
- Developed by: Jean Chalopin
- Directed by: Bruno Bianchi
- Voices of: Maurice LaMarche; Brian Drummond; Ellen Kennedy; Tegan Moss; Colin Murdock; Teryl Rothery; Alvin Sanders
- Composer: Jean-Michel Guirao
- Countries of origin: France; United States
- Original language: English
- No. of seasons: 1
- No. of episodes: 52

Production
- Executive producers: Jacqueline Tordjman; Olivier Dumont; Andy Heyward; Mike Maliani; Benoît Runel
- Producer: Bruno Bianchi
- Running time: 21 minutes
- Production companies: SIP Animation; DIC Entertainment Corporation

Original release
- Network: M6 (France); Fox Kids (Worldwide); Channel 5 (United Kingdom)
- Release: September 11, 2002 – November 29, 2003

Related
- Inspector Gadget

Gadget & the Gadgetinis is an animated television series and the sequel of the 1983 series Inspector Gadget. The series was a co-production between Fox Kids Europe, DIC Entertainment Corporation, French animation studio SIP Animation, French broadcaster M6 Métropole Télévision, the British Channel 5 and the Italian Mediatrade S.p.A.

Gadget & the Gadgetinis is currently a property of WildBrain, which holds the rights to most of DIC's library. The show was first screened at MIPTV 2002. Despite being co-produced in the United States, it never aired on television in that country.

== Plot ==
Having been recruited by an elite international peacekeeping group called the World Organization of Mega Powers (or WOMP for short), Lieutenant Gadget (promoted from his previous position of Inspector) now fights crime with a pair of mechanical assistants called the Gadgetinis, small robot versions of Gadget who were created by Penny (due to Brain retiring from active duty) and who are the unintended victims of Gadget's clumsiness.

As a member of WOMP, Lieutenant Gadget and his Gadgetinis still have to tangle with Doctor Claw and his organization M.A.D.

== Characters ==
- Lieutenant Gadget (voiced by Maurice LaMarche impersonating Don Adams) – Now working for WOMP as a Lieutenant, Gadget is still the same cyborg he was in the 1983 series, except that he has been upgraded with several new gadgets. He is usually blind to MAD's interference in missions or their presence, sometimes making it easier for them to continue with Dr. Claw's evil plans, but they are nearly always thwarted, usually by accident. Gadget's appearance is somewhat different from his original design, as his hat and coat are now dark grey, his gloves are yellow, his tie and pants are a brighter blue, and he looks a lot younger. He also wears green sunglasses in most episodes. (Funnily enough, LaMarche voiced Chief Quimby in the original show's second season.)
- The Gadgetinis (voiced by Maurice LaMarche) – Fidget (orange) and Digit (blue) are two small robots created by Penny who are miniature versions of Gadget. They frequently aid Gadget on his missions, and each has their own arsenal of hidden gadgets and devices, including video communicators in their chest pieces. Penny created them after Brain retired due to a nervous breakdown. Fidget is the most easily spooked of the pair. He does things robots cannot do, such as feeling pain or sneezing, which Digit usually questions. Digit is the smarter, more sarcastic, and more literal of the Gadgetinis. He often reminds Fidget that he is a robot when Fidget mutters about things that robots can't do; ironically, one of those traits is eating, which they would end up having after Penny gave them a piece of circuitry that allows them to do so.
- Penny (voiced by Tegan Moss) – Gadget's know-it-all 12-year-old niece is the creator of the Gadgetinis. Instead of secretly following Gadget, she contacts the Gadgetinis to offer advice and information from home. She usually does this from the attic, using her laptop computer and many other hi-tech tools, which replace her computer book and video watch. She also usually corrects Fidget about being a robot when he does something robots can't do, is less patient than she was in the original series, and has a bit of a short temper. Penny wears her hair in pigtails as she did in the original 1983 series.

=== WOMP ===
- General Sir (voiced by Alvin Sanders) – The leader of WOMP, the General assigns missions to Gadget. He is completely oblivious to Gadget's incompetence and antics. General Sir favors Gadget over Nozzaire because he's kinder than Nozzaire.
  - Ms. Miffet – Secretary of General Sir.
- Colonel Nozzaire (voiced by Colin Murdock) – Colonel Nozzaire (often called "Colonel Nose Hair" due to the name sounding similar, much to his annoyance.) is a former member of the French Foreign Legion and Gadget's new superior. Nozzaire hates Gadget and barely tolerates him because he is extremely stupid, repeatedly hurts him, and/or wrecks his office. Nozzaire constantly tries to partake in missions himself, only to get captured by M.A.D. or become badly injured as a result of Gadget's stupidity or incompetence.

=== M.A.D. ===
- Dr. Claw (voiced by Brian Drummond) – Unlike the original series, viewers can actually see his legs and torso from time to time, his gauntlets are now gold with black joints and knuckles, and with the M.A.D. logo printed on them. Most of the time, instead of banging his fist on his desk or hitting his cat, he scratches the arm of his chair when angered. He also sucks his thumb in his sleep. In addition, he also has a brother named Doctor Thaw and a nephew named William, who is Doctor Thaw's son.
  - MAD Cat (vocal effects provided by Ellen Kennedy and Frank Welker) – Doctor Claw's pet cat who now has a chair of his own.
- Maryland Claw (voiced by Teryl Rothery) – Doctor Claw and Doctor Thaw's mother and William's grandmother. She first met Claw's father in jail, the same day Gadget's parents met. Maryland has higher authority over her son even going as far as to stop him in his evil deeds. Doctor Claw once had his M.A.D. agents turned invisible so that they could try to rob her house, apparently to get some childhood trophies from her. Like her son, only Maryland's right hand is seen. Though in the episode "Erasing Gadget," her face does appear when Gadget travels back in time.

=== Other characters ===
- Brain (vocal effects provided by Lee Tockar) – After years of Gadget repeatedly mistaking him for M.A.D. agents and trying to apprehend him, Brain is now phobic and nervous when he hears Gadget's name and has taken refuge in a shack by a lake.
- Chief Quimby (voiced by Maurice LaMarche) – Now he's an agent of WOMP working as General Sir's top informant of the Cryptic Intelligence Agency (a parody of the real-life Central Intelligence Agency, or CIA). He uses self-destructing messages, much like the previous series.
- Jools & Annie Tamare – Gadget's parents and Penny's grandparents who first met each other by crashing their bicycles.
- Jeanette Sir – The General's daughter with whom Gadget falls in love.

== Episodes ==
No.	Title	Written by	Original release date	Prod. code
1	"Don't Call Me Gadget"	Jean Chalopin; Kurt Weldon	September 11, 2002	101
Col. Nozzaire gets abducted by aliens who have mistaken him for Gadget. Gadget and the Gadgetinis must rescue him.
2	"Looming Las Vegas"	Jean Chalopin; Ken Koonce; Kurt Weldon; David Weimers	TBA	102
Gadget and the Gadgetinis go to Las Vegas to be the General's bodyguards.
3	"Claw's Collection"	Jean Chalopin; Jim Fisher; Helene Skantzikas; Jim Staahl	TBA	103
When entire arsenals begin to disappear, it's suspected that Dr. Claw may be building a military campaign of his own. So naturally the lieutenant is sent to uncover the lost weapons and discover the secret location of Dr. Claw's hideout.
4	"Gadget Goes on Location"	Jean Chalopin; Kati Rocky; Bruce & Reed Shelly; Kurt Weldon	TBA	104
Gadget, Penny, and the Gadgetinis go to Dr. Claw's fake movie set which is used to steal military vehicles.
5	"Nice Guys Are Finished"	Jean Chalopin; Jim Fisher; Jack & Carole Mendelsohn; Jim Staahl; Kurt Weldon	TBA	105
Gadget and the Gadgetinis go to the Shangrilala island to protect the magical water from Dr. Claw.
6	"One Too Many Gadgets"	Jean Chalopin; Martha Moran; Helene Skantzikas	TBA	106
Doctor Wacko creates a machine to duplicate and replace the world leaders. Penny is caught in the middle when she discovers an evil duplication of her uncle is on the loose in France.
7	"Trick or Trap"	Jean Chalopin; Kurt Weldon	TBA	107
Gadget, Penny, and the Gadgetinis go to Chicago where Dr. Claw plans a Halloween party to assign any criminal to be his agents.
8	"Attack of the Killer Bees"	Jean Chalopin; Jim Fisher; Jim Staahl	TBA	108
Gadget and the Gadgetinis must stop an evil opera singer whose singing allows her to call upon killer bees and force them to commit crimes. Note: Dr. Claw is absent in this episode.
9	"Wrestle in Peace"	Jean Chalopin; Bruce & Reed Shelly; Kurt Weldon	TBA	109
When Dr. Claw wishes to annex a country who has a rich supply of plutonium, Gadget is sent in undercover as a wrestler.
10	"Gopher Broke"	Jean Chalopin; Madellaine Paxson; Bruce & Reed Shelly	TBA	110
When the world's landmarks begin disappearing, W.O.M.P. is asked to investigate. However when a gopher hair is discovered Gadget must go underground to solve this mystery.
11	"The Wuzzley Affair"	Jean Chalopin; John Loy; Martin Olson	TBA	111
The Wuzzley is the latest toy to hit the United Kingdom toy market but when a series of burglaries occur in MayFair, Penny and the Gadgetinis must cut their vacation short in order to investigate. Note: Dr Claw is absent in this episode.
12	"Face to Face to Face"	Jean Chalopin; Len Janson; Kurt Weldon	TBA	112
Gadget and the Gadgetinis inadvertently help a master of disguise called "The Chameleon" (who's posing as Col. Nozzaire) escape from jail. Meanwhile, Col. Nozzaire is very nervous and panic-stricken because Chameleon seeks revenge on him.
13	"No Such Thing as Ghosts"	Jean Chalopin; John Reynolds; Mike Samonek; Bruce Shelly	TBA	113
Gadget and the Gadgetinis go to the Neutrania to save King Olaf.
14	"High Noon"	Jean Chalopin; Martha Moran; Helene Skantzikas	TBA	114
When the western town of Cut n' Shoot decides to rename the town Gadgetville in honor of the legendary crime fighter, Gadget is asked to appear in person for the renaming ceremony. Note: Dr Claw is absent in this episode.
15	"Sasquatch Watch"	Jean Chalopin; Tedd & Patsi Anasti; Bill Marich; Doug Molitor; Rich Ross	TBA	115
Gadget and the Gadgetinis go to the forest to find a mechanical giant monster.
16	"In Touch with Your Animal Side"	Jean Chalopin; Martha Moran; Helene Skantzikas	TBA	116
Gadget and the Gadgetinis must stop Dr. Claw's scientist who's transforming people into animals.
17	"Nozzaire's Day Off"	Jean Chalopin; Tedd & Patsi Anasti; Kurt Weldon	TBA	117
One of Dr. Claw's agents tries to distract Gadget and Col. Nozzaire while the other agents create a giant robot with Gadget's look.
18	"The General's Daughter"	Jean Chalopin; Jim Fisher; Thomas Hart; Jim Staahl	TBA	118
General Sir assigns Gadget and Col. Nozzaire to protect the "Peace Arsenal" (Gadget) and his daughter during the party (Col. Nozzaire). Col. Nozzaire switches assignments, but he ends up being controlled by one of Dr. Claw's agents to steal the key to the Arsenal. The key is in the bracelet which Gadget gave to Jeanette. Gadget ends up falling in love with Jeanette and they both have the time of their lives.
19	"Unpleasant Island"	Jean Chalopin; Gary Cooper; Allan Neuwirth; Kati Rocky	TBA	119
Dr. Claw hires three criminals to his game show called "Unpleasant Island" to eliminate Gadget.
20	"Help Wanted"	Jean Chalopin; Jim Fisher; Bruce & Reed Shelly; Jim Staahl	TBA	120
Col. Nozzaire fires Gadget from WOMP. Gadget is assigned by one of Dr. Claw's agents to work for him.
21	"The Ultimate Weapon"	Jean Chalopin; Jim Fisher; Jim Staahl	TBA	121
Penny puts on the Gadgetinis the system to help them with digesting. Meanwhile, Gadget and the Gadgetinis must protect the stink animals during the contest which is organized by Dr. Claw. After eating too much, the Gadgetinis stink and win the contest, but they realize that the winners will be crushed to the concentrated stink extract which then will be used to stink the whole world. Penny blames herself for the situation and she has to save the Gadgetinis.
22	"Reality Bites"	Jean Chalopin; Kate Donahue; Scott Kreamer; Kurt Weldon	TBA	122
Gadget and the Gadgetinis must protect Dr. Budd's Imaginatron, which turns thoughts into reality, from being stolen.
23	"The Weather Machine"	Jean Chalopin; Michael Merton; Martin Olson	TBA	123
Gadget is hypnotized by Dr. Claw's agent's TV commercial to go to Antarctica where Dr. Claw builds his weather machine to freeze the world.
24	"Weekend at the Beach"	Jean Chalopin; Tedd & Patsi Anasti; Len Janson	TBA	124
Two alien teenagers land on Earth to go to the beach party where Penny is spending the weekend. Two scientists are hunting for the aliens. Gadget, Penny, and the Gadgetinis must protect the alien teenagers. Note: Dr. Claw is absent in this episode.
25	"Prison Cruise"	Jean Chalopin; Tedd & Patsi Anasti; Grant Moran	TBA	125
One of Dr. Claw's agents, who's disguised as Gadget, frames Gadget for committing crimes in order to make him to go to prison. Penny, the Gadgetinis, and Col. Nozzaire must prove that Gadget is innocent.
26	"Ice Folly"	Jean Chalopin; Madellaine Paxson; Kati Rocky	TBA	126
Dr. Claw's twin brother, Dr. Thaw, is freed from his snowy prison. He's going to again use the stolen missiles to take over the world. Gadget and the Gadgetinis must stop him.
27	"Unseen of the Crime"	Jean Chalopin; Michael Edens; Kurt Weldon	TBA	127
One of Penny's friends, Sean Jellypin, who invented the invisibility formula, is kidnapped by Dr. Claw.
28	"Total ReClaw"	Jean Chalopin; Kate Donahue; Scott Kreamer; Kurt Weldon	TBA	128
Dr. Claw falsely turns from bad to good.
29	"The World's Nicest Dictator"	Jean Chalopin; Rowby Goren; Helene Skantzikas	TBA	129
When the world leaders agree to meet on a small island nation ruled by a dictator, Gadget is sent in to inspect and survey what claims to be "the most peaceful nation in the world". Note: Dr. Claw is absent in this episode.
30	"Roverre"	Jean Chalopin; Jim Fisher; John Reynolds; Mike Samonek; Jim Staahl	TBA	130
Gadget, Penny, and the Gadgetinis must protect a dog called Roverre who can paint with his tail from being kidnapped by Dr. Claw to force Roverre to teach M.A.D. Cat how to paint.
31	"Bye Bye Business"	Jean Chalopin; Michael Edens; Jim Fisher; Jim Staahl	TBA	131
Gadget and the Gadgetinis go to Hong Kong to buy office supplies for WOMP, but they realize that the shop called Banan is infiltrated by Dr. Claw's agents.
32	"Sub-Mission"	Jean Chalopin; Adam Lapidus; Allan Neuwirth; Helene Skantzikas	TBA	132
Gadget and the Gadgetinis must protect a fleet of atomic submarines.
33	"The Great Wall of Oblivia"	Jean Chalopin	TBA	133
Gadget, Penny, and the Gadgetinis must protect The Great Wall of China from being stolen and used as "The Great Wall of Oblivia".
34	"MADster Game"	Jean Chalopin	TBA	134
Gadget and Col. Nozzaire are sucked by the bathroom mirror into Dr. Claw's game. Penny and the Gadgetinis must work quickly or Gadget and Col. Nozzaire will be trapped inside the game forever.
35	"Santa Claw"	Jean Chalopin	TBA	138
Gadget, Penny, and the Gadgetinis go to the North Pole to save Christmas and Kris Kringle from Dr. Claw's clutches.
36	"No Brainer"	Jean Chalopin	TBA	135
Penny becomes desperate when her uncle is declared missing in action whilst on an assignment. With no other option available, she must ask for help from an old friend close to her heart: her pet dog, Brain! But will Brain overcome his Gadget-induced phobia and return to active duty or will he chicken out and leave Penny without an uncle? Guest: Brain from Inspector Gadget.
37	"Meet Super G.G."	Jean Chalopin	TBA	136
WOMP creates a female cyborg called Gadget Girl to have a partnership with Gadget. Gadget falls in love with Gadget Girl However, Dr. Claw controls the cyborg to destroy Gadget.
38	"Extreme Gadget"	Jean Chalopin	TBA	137
Gadget and the Gadgetinis must protect Albert Alkaline's extreme sports fanatic son, Alan Albert Alkaline, from being kidnapped.
39	"McIntosh's Bagpipes"	Jean Chalopin	TBA	139
Gadget, Penny and the Gadgetinis go to Scotland to stop Dr. Claw's new agent, McIntosh, who uses his bagpipes to make everyone sleepy and unable to stop him from committing crimes.
40	"The Patrix"	Jean Chalopin	TBA	140
When M.A.D discovers how to create digital minions, the lieutenant is recruited by the "Head Gardener" to be the chosen one.
41	"Swap Team"	Jean Chalopin	TBA	141
One of Dr. Claw's scientists swaps Gadget's brain with a criminal known as Guy Strong's brain with the help of his swapping machine put on the telephones. Penny and the Gadgetinis must reverse the process.
42	"Super Gadget Chef"	Jean Chalopin	TBA	142
Gadget and the Gadgetinis go undercover as chefs to stop Dr. Claw's agent called "The Silver Chef" from poisoning the presidents.
43	"Foreign Legion Gadget"	Jean Chalopin	TBA	143
Gadget, the Gadgetinis, and Col. Nozzaire go to Col. Nozzaire's old desert Foreign Legion post to investigate rumors of female criminals converging on the area.
44	"Solid Gold Gadget"	Jean Chalopin	TBA	144
When a Himalayan village suddenly becomes the new Sin City and a Sherpa with the Midas touch goes missing, naturally Dr. Claw is suspected. And now it's up to Gadget to find the legendary Golda before Dr. Claw wreaks havoc on the world economy.
45	"Super Boss Gadget"	Jean Chalopin	TBA	145
While General Sir stays at the hospital, Gadget becomes a temporary boss of WOMP. Guest: Chief Quimby from Inspector Gadget.
46	"Erasing Gadget"	Jean Chalopin	TBA	146
The M.A.D eraser goes back in time in the 1950s to not let Gadget's parents meet each other to make sure that Gadget will never be born.
47	"Rock 'n Gadget"	Jean Chalopin	TBA	147
Gadget, Penny and the Gadgetinis must protect a rock band called "The Mummies Boys" from Dr. Claw.
48	"Gadget on the Brain"	Jean Chalopin	TBA	148
Gadget is shrunk down to microscopic size and enters the brain of General Gastritas to remove a mind-control device.
49	"The Lost City of Gold"	Jean Chalopin	TBA	149
Gadget, Penny, the Gadgetinis and Col. Nozzaire go protect "The Lost City of Gold" from Dr. Claw.
50	"Operation Get Gadget"	Jean Chalopin	TBA	150
One of Dr. Claw's agents invent a pair of glasses which can control minds to use any person to eliminate Gadget.
51	"Claw's Nephew"	Jean Chalopin	TBA	151
Gadget, Penny and the Gadgetinis visit an island. Unbeknownst to them, Dr. Claw's hideout is at the island. Penny befriends Dr. Claw's nephew, William "Billy" Thaw, who doesn't know who his uncle really is.
52	"The Comet, the Unicorn and the Bad Gadgetinis"	Jean Chalopin	November 29, 2003	152
Something seems wrong with the Gadgetinis, could it be that they're demanding money, that they're unusually aggressive or is it the fact that they're trying to destroy Lt. Gadget? The answer is all of the above, when a comet returns after 777 years, it emits a strange magnetic wave that not only reveals invisible unicorns, but makes some electronic devices go haywire.

== Production ==
The original creators of Inspector Gadget reunited for this series. Andy Heyward initiated the concept and was one of the executive producers; Jean Chalopin created/developed the show and wrote or co-wrote every episode; while Bruno Bianchi designed the main characters as well as directing and producing the series. Gadget & the Gadgetinis follows basically the same plot as the original series, with the clueless Gadget attempting to fight crime while Penny and her helpers do all the work and he takes full credit for it, when he had no idea what happened. Dr. Claw appears less frequently and there are new villains for the group to contend with. Each episode would be budgeted at approximately $400,000 per episode. Saban was originally intended to distribute internationally Gadget & the Gadgetinis. There were also going to be more Gadgetinis as the show would progress.

While Brain and Chief Quimby are mainly absent from the show, they do appear in pictures in Gadget's house. Each also appears as a special guest in one episode. Brain appears in episode 36, "No Brainer", which reveals that, having been traumatized after years of pain while saving Gadget and Gadget mistaking him for M.A.D. Agents, he retired from crime-fighting to live in a riverside house, which only Penny knows about. The mere mention of the word "gadget" is enough to drive him frantic. Brain is also mentioned in the episode "Roverre". Chief Quimby appears in episode 45, "Super Boss Gadget". They both appear on television in the episode "Too Many Gadgets".

The French end credits to the series show a series of sketches of Penny going to visit Brain at his riverside home. The pair enjoy an emotional reunion.

Maurice LaMarche continued as Gadget's voice, reprising his role from the Sunday Movie Toon, "Inspector Gadget's Last Case", as did Brian Drummond (Dr. Claw) and Tegan Moss (Penny).

Jean-Michel Guirao composed the musical underscore, and the main title song for the English-speaking version was written and performed by Mike Piccirillo. However, the European and French theme songs for "Gadgetinis" were explicitly different: The French version's theme, composed by Noam Kaniel and David Vadant, sounded very close to Shuki Levy and Haim Saban's original Inspector Gadget theme, and was in fact based on the original series' theme song. (The French end credits for the show state: "Musique des génériques: Noam Kaniel, David Vadant, K.I.A. productions. D'après le "Thème de l'Inspecteur Gadget". Musique originale de Haim Saban et Shuki Levy.") The reason this was possible - even though DiC Entertainment (which owned Inspector Gadget) no longer had the rights to Levy and Saban's theme music - is probably that Gadget & the Gadgetinis was produced primarily by the French animation studio SIP Animation, which at the time of production was owned by Haim Saban.

== Broadcast ==
The show was broadcast across various European countries on Fox Kids starting in late 2002, and remained on some stations after the Jetix rebranding.

- In the United Kingdom, the show aired on Channel 5, who were one of the co-producers. They first aired the show in August 2002, a month before it aired in France on M6.
- In the United States, the show was planned to air on Fox Family; but since Fox Family Worldwide was purchased by Disney, it never did.
- In countries where the channel operated from, it also re-ran on Jetix Play.
- The show was airing in Canada on Family Channel.

== Merchandise ==
An event was held at Quick restaurants in France in April 2003.

=== Video game ===
A video game based on the series, titled Gadget & Gadgetinis was released for the PlayStation 2 and PC in November 2004. The game developed by Eko Software and published by Hip Games, who had acquired the Inspector Gadget video game license after acquiring Light & Shadow Production in February of that year. It was first unveiled at E3 2004, following an announcement on May 5, 2004; further, the game was only released in PAL regions, much like with Mad Robots Invasion.

The game's gameplay was mostly criticized for its unoriginality, as well as the character designs and the music. The controls and the game's appeal to children received praise.
