= Jack Hanrahan =

American writer (1933–2008)

- Hanrahan circa 1969
- Born: January 16, 1933; Cleveland, Ohio, United States
- Died: April 28, 2008 (age 75); Cleveland, Ohio, United States
- Occupation: Comedy writer
- Writing career
- Genre: Comedy

John Vincent Hanrahan (January 16, 1933 – April 28, 2008) was an American comedy writer.

== Biography ==
Born January 16, 1933, in Cleveland, Ohio, he began writing cartoons for the Cleveland Press. After that, he moved on to Hollywood, California and continued his writing career with work on Get Smart. Then, in 1968, he won an Emmy for his work on Rowan & Martin's Laugh-In. Both he and the show's head writer Paul Keyes created the Flying Fickle Finger of Fate Award, with Hanrahan credited with the trophy and Keyes its name. Following this, he moved on to Marcus Welby, M.D., The Sonny & Cher Comedy Hour, Police Woman, The Waltons, and CHiPs. In the 1980s and '90s, he worked on a scattering of television shows and movies, including co-writing the Super Mario World episode "The Wheel Thing" and serving as one of four writers for the second season (1985–86) of the cartoon series Inspector Gadget, as well as writing & co-writing shorts for the 1980 revival of Tom & Jerry. Hanrahan teamed-up for a while with Eleanor Burian-Mohr and wrote for many animation shows. He also co-starred in the motion picture Up Your Alley in 1988 for writer/director Bob Logan.

Hanrahan left Beverly Hills for Eureka in northern California in 1992. After losing his wife in 2004, he was stricken with grief. He would still entertain at charity events and retirement homes but never found his way back to happiness. In 2006, he was evicted following a garage fire and all of his possessions, including his Emmy, were seized by his landlord. He began to wander the streets. Jack Riley, an old friend, tried to help Hanrahan, but was unsuccessful.

After friends in Eureka bought him a bus ticket, he returned to his hometown of Cleveland, where he remained homeless until his death. Hanrahan was featured on the front page of The Plain Dealer (Cleveland, Ohio) on March 22, 2007, detailing his homelessness. He died on April 28, 2008.

== Screenwriting credits ==
=== Television ===
- series head writer denoted in bold
- Dr. Kildare (1965)
- Frankenstein Jr. and the Impossibles (1966)
- Birdman and the Galaxy Trio (1967)
- Fantastic Four (1967)
- Get Smart (1967–1968)
- Rowan & Martin's Laugh-In (1968)
- The Banana Splits (1968–1970)
- Insight (1969–1977)
- The Mouse Factory (1972)
- Bridget Loves Bernie (1973)
- Gibbsville (1976)
- Dinky Dog (1978)
- The All-New Popeye Hour (1978)
- Sport Billy (1980–1981)
- The Tom and Jerry Comedy Show (1980)
- Heathcliff (1980)
- Spider-Man (1981–1982)
- Heathcliff (1984, 1986)
- Yogi's Treasure Hunt (1985)
- Care Bears (1985)
- Inspector Gadget (1985–1986)
- Dennis the Menace (1986)
- Popples (1986)
- Beverly Hills Teens (1987)
- Hello Kitty's Furry Tale Theater (1987)
- Maxie's World (1987)
- DuckTales (1987)
- The New Archies (1987)
- Sylvanian Families (1987)
- The New Yogi Bear Show (1988)
- The Super Mario Bros. Super Show! (1989)
- Tom & Jerry Kids (1990)
- Camp Candy (1990)
- Super Mario World (1991)
- Captain Zed and the Zee Zone (1991, 1993)
- Super Dave: Daredevil for Hire (1992)
- Adventures of Sonic the Hedgehog (1993)
- All-New Dennis the Menace (1993)
- **Gadget Boy & Heather** (1995–1998): season 1 head writer

=== Film ===
- Inspector Gadget Saves Christmas (1992)
