= Inspector Gadget (video game) =

1993 video game

- Cover art
- Developer: AIM
- Publisher: Hudson Soft
- Designer: Noriyuki Shishikura
- Programmers: Tōru Nakagawa; Kennosuke Suemura (Sound programming)
- Composer: Saori Kobayashi
- Platform: Super NES
- Release: NA: December 1993
- Genre: 2D action platformer
- Mode: Single-player

Inspector Gadget is a 1993 side-scrolling action video game for the Super Nintendo Entertainment System based on the television show of the same title. The game was released by Hudson Soft, with developers who also worked on Hudson's video game adaptations SWAT Kats: The Radical Squadron and An American Tail: Fievel Goes West.

The normally bumbling Gadget is portrayed as fairly competent as he must rescue his niece Penny from the clutches of Dr. Claw and his M.A.D. terrorist organization. Dr. Claw's face makes a rare appearance in the game, unlike the cartoon, which keeps his face hidden.

== Gameplay ==
Dr. Claw's face makes a brief appearance in the game's last level.

The player controls Inspector Gadget as he travels around the world to rescue his niece Penny, who has been kidnapped by the terrorist organization M.A.D. and its leader Dr. Claw. Each level is preceded by a short intro at Gadget's house, reprising the running gag of the series in which Gadget blows up Chief Quimby via self-destructing messages.

When hit by an enemy, Gadget's clothing falls off, leaving him wearing only boxer shorts. The next hit causes Gadget to lose a life. Additional coats are hidden in breakable bricks and can be acquired to restore his second hit point.

Gadget's primary weapons are his extendable limbs, which can be used to punch and kick enemies. A power-up allows Gadget to extend the maximum reach of his limbs. Various gadgets can also be collected and used, including a helicopter rotor, plungers and arrows. Gadgets can be powered up as well, which has various effects depending on the gadget, such as making the arrows deal more damage. Most gadgets are powered by hats, with each gadget requiring a certain number of hats to operate. Additional hats can be collected in levels by breaking certain bricks. Common enemies in the levels include M.A.D. agents and each level has a fixed time limit. Running out of time costs Gadget a life. When there are seventeen seconds left in the timer, a frantic melody plays, warning the player to hurry up and finish the level.

The levels are based on actual locales from the television series. They are: Count Dracula's castle in England, Cuckoo Clock Maker's clock tower in Switzerland, Jungle Bob's jungle hideout in South America, King Tutonpoot's tomb in Egypt and Dr. Claw's Winterland Castle. Each level boss is Dr. Claw himself, who battles Gadget in various different ways. At the end of the last level, Dr. Claw escapes into an airship and Gadget must face him in a Mech.

After the fight, Claw retreats and Gadget saves Penny who is falling from the ship. Gadget then receives a note from Chief Quimby informing him Dr. Claw had now captured Quimby, much to Gadget's chagrin.

== Reception ==
Allgame gave Inspector Gadget a rating of 2.5 out of 5. Electronic Gaming Monthly praised the game for the variety of items that must be used and for the graphics, which they felt were reminiscent of the cartoon series. They gave the game a rating of 6.6 out of 10. Nintendo Power covered the game in its February 1994 issue. Power Unlimited gave a review score of 89% summarizing: "Inspector Gadget is a refreshing platform game. Of course the cartoon was already one of the coolest out there, but the game beat everything. Just as fun as the cartoon and maybe even better. Laughable, original and varied."
