= Inspector Gadget: Advance Mission =

2001 video game

- Developer: Magic Pockets
- Publishers: Light & Shadow Production (Europe); DreamCatcher Interactive (North America)
- Platform: Game Boy Advance
- Release: EU: November 30, 2001; NA: February 19, 2002
- Genre: Action
- Mode: Single-player

Inspector Gadget: Advance Mission is a video game based on the television show of the same name.

== Reception ==
Reception

Aggregate score
Aggregator	Score
GameRankings	69% (6 reviews)
