= Inspector Gadget: Operation Madkactus =

2000 video game

- Developer: RFX Interactive
- Publishers: Ubi Soft; Light & Shadow Production
- Platform: Game Boy Color
- Release: EU: December 1, 2000; NA: March 20, 2001
- Genre: Action
- Mode: Single-player

Inspector Gadget: Operation Madkactus is a video game based on the television show of the same name.

== Plot ==
Once again the evil Dr. Claw has unleashed misery onto the world by releasing a horrible new malady called the Madkactus virus. Now it is up to Inspector Gadget, his niece Penny and her dog Brain to stop Dr. Claw's latest plan and save the world yet again.

== Gameplay ==
The gameplay is a side-scrolling action game as the player takes control of Inspector Gadget, Penny and Brain in five different levels, each with four different areas to explore. The player would experience enemies and traps along the way and can use famous devices such as the hammer hat, spring arms and rocket shoes to either elude or eliminate enemies or avoid deadly traps.

Along the way, however, Gadget would have to rely on Penny and Brain to reach areas that are inaccessible to him. Both are weaker in attacking, but are faster and can be used to transverse past traps and deactivate them to let Gadget pass or solve puzzles in mini-game form in order to advance to the next area.

Additionally, players could find power-ups such as muffins which restored health and GG symbols, obtaining 20 of these symbols would give an extra life. Also M.A.D. symbols give Gadget three extra lives. Gadget can also pick up weapon items such as plungers, which can pick off enemies from a long distance or nets which can instantly kill any enemies that it comes in contact with.
