= Tales of the Neon Sea =

2019 video game

- Windows cover art
- Developers: Palm Pioneer, YiTi Games
- Publishers: Zodiac Interactive, Boke Technology Co., Ltd, Thermite Games
- Engine: Unity
- Platforms: Windows, iOS, Android, Nintendo Switch, Xbox One, Xbox Series X/S, PlayStation 4
- Release: 30 April 2019: 30 April 2019 (Win); October 28, 2020 (iOS); August 5, 2021 (Android); March 30, 2023 (Xbox One, Series X/S); April 20, 2023 (Switch); April 21, 2023 (PS4)
- Genres: Adventure, Puzzle
- Mode: Single-player

Tales of the Neon Sea is an adventure video game developed by Chinese studio Palm Pioneer. It is a retro-styled pixel-art game in a cyberpunk setting.

== Gameplay ==
The goal of Tales of the Neon Sea is to walk around in search of clues and solve a series of puzzles and brain teasers.

Players assume the role of Rex, a hard-boiled detective, to investigate a case. The protagonist is forced to use mechanical prosthetics due to injuries. He can use electronic eyes to scan objects and analyze corpses during investigation.

In some scenes, players will control the protagonist's assistant, William the black cat, to enter areas inaccessible to Rex to explore or collect items.

== Plot ==
Set in a neo-noir metropolis where humans and robots contend with escalating tensions and mutual distrust, the storyline follows Rex, formerly a veteran police detective accepting random jobs as a private investigator to make ends meet.

== Development ==
The game was successfully crowd-funded through Kickstarter in 2018.

== Reception ==
Reception

Aggregate scores
Aggregator	Score
Metacritic	62/100
OpenCritic	61/100; 13% Critics Recommend

Review scores
Publication	Score
Adventure Gamers	2/5 stars
The Games Machine (Italy)	6.5/10
IGN Spain	6/10
Gamer Sky	8/10

Upon release, Tales of the Neon Sea received mixed reviews by users and critics.

On review aggregate OpenCritic, Tales of the Neon Sea had an average 61 out of 100 review score with 13% approval rating based on 8 reviews. The game received "mixed or average" reviews according to review aggregator Metacritic.

=== Accolades ===
In 2018, Tales of the Neon Sea won the award for "Excellence in Visual Art", and was nominated for "Excellence in Narrative" and "Best Game Grand Prize" at IndiePlay China Independent Game Competition. The game won the awards for "Most Innovative Game" and "Best Game Design" from Indie Prize at Casual Connect Asia 2018. In 2019, the game was nominated for "Visual Excellence" award at BitSummit.
