= Inspector Gadget: Mission 1 – Global Terror! =

1992 video game

Inspector Gadget: Mission 1 - Global Terror!
- Developer: Azeroth
- Publisher: Azeroth
- Platform: MSDOS
- Release: NA: 1992
- Genre: Adventure
- Mode: Single-player

Inspector Gadget: Mission 1 – Global Terror! is a graphic adventure game based on the animated television series Inspector Gadget. It was published by Azeroth for MS-DOS compatible operating systems in 1992. Gadget is assigned a mission to rescue United Nations members who have been kidnapped and scattered around the world by his nemesis Dr. Claw. Players control Gadget's niece Penny and her dog Brain to assist the clueless Gadget in his mission. Despite the "Mission 1" label, this is the only game in the series.

== Gameplay ==
Players can switch between controlling Penny and Brain. Their first objective is to rescue Gadget from Dr. Claw's castle in Metro City, where Gadget has been captured and stripped of his gadgets. After that, players can select from a variety of different locations around the globe where Dr. Claw has hidden the UN representatives. In each location, Gadget goes off on his own to solve the case. As Penny, players can then gather clues and use items to locate the missing representative. She then gets captured, leaving it up to Brain to rescue her. Along the way, Penny finds one of Gadget's missing gadgets. Brain cannot use inventory items, but can gather items from the environment and disguise himself.

After Brain rescues Penny, she and Brain rejoin with Inspector Gadget. They must give the inspector his missing gadget, which they can then use to rescue the brainwashed representative. After all the UN ambassadors are rescued, the three can then go to New York City and foil Dr. Claw's evil plot.

Actions are controlled via a set of icons on the bottom of the screen. In addition to standard look and use commands, as Penny players can access her computer book to look up information or use one of the inspector's gadgets. She can also talk to Brain using her wristwatch communicator.
