= Inspector Gadget: Mad Robots Invasion =

2003 video game

- Developer: Silmarils
- Publishers: Light and Shadow Production
- Series: Inspector Gadget
- Platform: PlayStation 2
- Release: EU: 2003
- Genre: Platformer
- Mode: Single-player

Inspector Gadget: Mad Robots Invasion (French: Inspecteur Gadget: L'invasion des Robots Mad) is a 2.5D platform video game based on the 1983 Inspector Gadget television series. It was released for the PlayStation 2 in 2003 only in Europe.

== Gameplay ==
The game takes the form of a 2.5D platformer with the player guiding the titular character through several levels to free his companions, Penny and Brain, who have been captured by Dr. Claw. The levels are based on real world locations such as New York City, Paris, London, Mexico and the Caribbean.

In the main levels, the protagonist is limited with which gadgets can be used, however other tools can be used in the bonus minigames that appear throughout the game. The game also includes a two-player mode unlocked when the game is beaten.

== Reception ==
Reception

Review scores
| Publication | Score |
|---|---|
| Jeuxvideo.com | 8/20 |
| Gamezone | 4.8/10 |

Inspector Gadget: Mad Robots Invasion a mostly negative response from reviewers. French website Jeuxvideo gave the game a score 8/20, criticising the graphics and the level design which they felt was empty and unoriginal. They also noted that the game was buggy, although they did praise the jumping mechanics and animations which they called "very decent".

German website Gamezone gave the game a 4.8/10, complementing the clearly laid-out levels that made it hard to go in the wrong direction, but were critical of the animations which they thought were simplistic and repetitive. They were also highly critical of the sound design which they found annoying. They concluded that the game "will only excite very young video gamers".
