= Bruno Bianchi (cartoonist) =

French animator and cartoonist

- Born: 6 September 1955; Chartres, France
- Died: 2 December 2011 (aged 56); Paris, France
- Burial place: Père Lachaise Cemetery
- Occupation: Animator
- Years active: 1977–2011

Bruno Bianchi (Italian: [ˈbruːno ˈbjaŋki], French: [bʁyno bjɑ̃ki]; 6 September 1955 – 2 December 2011) was a French cartoonist, comics artist and animation director. Bianchi worked extensively as an artist, director and producer on animated television productions, including Heathcliff, Iznogoud and most notably, Inspector Gadget, which he also co-created.

== Career ==
Bianchi started his career at DiC Audiovisuel (later DiC Entertainment) in 1977 at age 22 as a cel painter, then gradually assumed creative positions. His first director's credit was on the 1980 edutainment mini-series Archibald le Magichien (directly translated: Archibald the Magic Dog). In 1983, Bianchi scored his first major directing job on Inspector Gadget, a series he co-created with Andy Heyward and DiC's founder Jean Chalopin. Bianchi served as main character designer and supervising director on the show, which became one of the most iconic series produced by DiC.

Subsequently, Bianchi worked as a director, producer and designer on numerous other DiC Entertainment, Saban Entertainment and SIP Animation television animation productions, from the 1980s until the mid-2000s. His credits include Heathcliff (where he co-created the Cats and Company characters together with Jean Chalopin), Jayce and the Wheeled Warriors, M.A.S.K., Rainbow Brite, Diplodos (which he co-created and co-wrote with Jean Chalopin), Iznogoud, Princess Sissi and Gadget & the Gadgetinis (a spinoff of Inspector Gadget).

In 2008, following the closure of SIP Animation, Bianchi founded his studio, Ginkgo Animation. One of Ginkgo's projects had been George and Me (French title Georges et Moi), an adaptation of a 2006 Soleil Productions comic series that had first been picked up by SIP Animation as early as December 2007, and had been planned to start production at SIP at the beginning of 2009. However, by April 2011, this venture of Ginkgo's was considered unsuccessful due to changing priorities in the French animation industry, according to one of the authors of the original comics.

Bianchi died on 2 December 2011 at the age of 56. He was buried in Père Lachaise Cemetery in Paris on 6 December 2011.

== Filmography ==
=== Director ===
- 1983: Inspector Gadget
- 1984: Heathcliff
- 1985: Jayce and the Wheeled Warriors
- 1985: Rainbow Brite
- 1985: Hulk Hogan's Rock 'n' Wrestling
- 1985: M.A.S.K.
- 1986: Popples
- 1988: Diplodos
- 1992: Around the World in Eighty Dreams
- 1995: Space Strikers
- 1995: Iznogoud
- 1996: The Why Why? Family
- 1997: Princess Sissi
- 1997: Walter Melon
- 1998: Jim Button
- 2000: Wunschpunsch
- 2002: Gadget & the Gadgetinis
- 2004: The Tofus

=== Producer ===
- 1995: Iznogoud
- 1996: The Why Why? Family
- 1997: Princess Sissi
- 1998: Jim Button
- 2001: Wunschpunsch
- 2002: Gadget & the Gadgetinis
- 2003: What's with Andy? (season 2 only)
- 2004: The Tofus
- 2004: W.I.T.C.H.
- 2005: A.T.O.M. (Alpha Teens on Machines)
- 2008: Combo Niños
