= Inspector Gadget (1983 TV series) =

Animated television series

- Genre: Science fiction Comedy; Detective
- Created by: Andy Heyward; Jean Chalopin; Bruno Bianchi
- Developed by: Jean Chalopin
- Written by: Peter Sauder (season 1); Jean Chalopin (season 2)
- Directed by: Bruno Bianchi
- Voices of: Don Adams; Frank Welker; Cree Summer Francks; Dan Hennessey; Holly Berger; Maurice LaMarche
- Theme music composer: Shuki Levy; Haim Saban
- Composers: Shuki Levy; Haim Saban
- Countries of origin: France (Season 1); Canada (Season 1); United States (Season 2); Japan; Taiwan
- Original languages: English French
- No. of seasons: 2
- No. of episodes: 86 (list of episodes)

Production
- Executive producers: Jean Chalopin; Andy Heyward; Tetsuo Katayama
- Producers: Jean Chalopin; Andy Heyward; Tetsuo Katayama; Patrick Loubert (season 1)
- Animators: Tokyo Movie Shinsha (season 1); Cuckoo's Nest (season 1); K.K. DIC Asia (season 2)
- Running time: 22 minutes
- Production companies: DIC (Note: The first season was produced by DIC Audiovisuel in France, while the second season was produced by its American branch DIC Enterprises.); Lexington Broadcast Services Company; Field Communications; Nelvana (season 1)

Original release
- Network: First-run syndication (United States); FR3 (France)
- Release: December 4, 1982 (pilot)
- Release: September 5, 1983 – November 13, 1985 (series)

Related
- Inspector Gadget Saves Christmas; Gadget & the Gadgetinis; Inspector Gadget (2015–2018)

Inspector Gadget (French: Inspecteur Gadget) is an animated children's science fiction comedy series created by Andy Heyward, Jean Chalopin and Bruno Bianchi, and was produced by DIC Audiovisuel in association with Lexington Broadcast Services Company. The show revolves around the adventures of a clumsy, dim-witted police officer from Metro City named Inspector Gadget—a police inspector with various bionic gadgets built into his body—who is sent on missions to thwart plans by his nemesis Dr. Claw, the leader of an evil organization known as "M.A.D.", while unknowingly being assisted by his niece Penny and their dog, Brain. It stars the voice of Don Adams as the titular character.

Inspector Gadget debuted on December 4, 1982, as an exclusive pilot. The series is the first American cartoon show to be produced by DIC, which specifically created the series to help the company expand into the North American market. This is the first animated series to be presented in stereo sound. It originally ran from 1983 to 1985, broadcasting 86 episodes over two seasons, and remained in syndication into the late 1990s. The series proved to be a success for DIC, not only launching the Inspector Gadget franchise, including additional animated productions such as a 2015 sequel series and two live-action films, but also encouraging the company to produce additional programs such as Heathcliff. In January 2009, IGN named Inspector Gadget as the 54th best in the Top 100 Best Animated TV Shows.

Since 2012, the rights to Inspector Gadget have been owned by WildBrain (formerly DHX Media) through its in-name-only unit, Cookie Jar Entertainment. Cookie Jar had purchased DiC and its library of shows in 2008, and was itself acquired by DHX Media in 2012.

== Premise ==
Inspector Gadget, the titular character of the series, is a world-famous cyborg police inspector who works for a secret police organization that combats crime across the globe, with each of his missions focused on thwarting the criminal schemes of M.A.D. ("Mean And Dirty")—a criminal organization led by the nefarious Dr. Claw, and conducted by his agents. Missions that he undertakes often occur in a foreign locale, or within the fictional city of Metro City. Despite the fact that Inspector Gadget is equipped with numerous gadgets to help him, including a personal vehicle that can morph between a family minivan to a compact police car, he is ultimately incompetent and clueless on each mission, proposing ludicrous theories behind a crime or mistaking M.A.D. agents for friendly locals. He often uses a gadget that he did not call for, and is sometimes prone to causing trouble inadvertently for those around him. An example of this is a running gag, inspired by the "self-destruct" message, in which Inspector Gadget is given briefing messages from his boss Chief Quimby, who primarily hands them to him while in disguise, only to have them unintentionally returned to him before they detonate.

In reality, the investigations are often conducted by Inspector Gadget's niece, Penny, who has a talent for investigation despite her young age and regularly thwarts M.A.D.'s plans, at the same time ensuring that her uncle remains out of harm's way, as Dr. Claw frequently instructs his agents to get rid of Inspector Gadget before he can stop them. Even though Inspector Gadget is incompetent, he always escapes danger due to luck, either from a misfired gadget, or from the secret assistance of the family dog Brain, who usually shadows him in disguise; on most occasions, his disguise often causes Inspector Gadget to chase him in the mistaken belief that Brain is the M.A.D. agent he's meant. While Penny remains in contact with Brain during her investigation, she is often placed in danger and either escapes by recalling Brain to help, or using her own technology. Despite the pair's involvement, both make it certain that Inspector Gadget is seen to have completed the mission in Quimby's opinion; yet in most cases, it is either Penny and Brain's background activities or just luck through which Inspector Gadget actually completes a mission. Dr. Claw always vows revenge on Inspector Gadget for thwarting his schemes, and flees the scene on most occasions having been on site to oversee his plans.

Like many cartoons made in the 1980s, Inspector Gadget always ended each episode with a public service announcement advising how to handle a situation, such as eating healthy.

== Characters ==
- Inspector Gadget (Inspecteur Gadget in French) (voiced by Jesse White in the pilot (1st version), Gary Owens in the pilot (2nd version) and by Don Adams in the pilot (3rd version) and main series): The main protagonist of the series. Despite being brave, well-intentioned and laden with many gadgets in his body, he is frequently absent-minded and clueless, bungles his cases and gets himself into danger, only escaping from trouble and completing his missions with luck (though in the earliest-produced episodes, Gadget was halfway-brilliant, deducing that Dr. Claw is nearby and even became infuriated when he lost his nemesis in a high-speed chase). A policeman by nature, he is a caring family man who often takes risks to protect his niece Penny and their dog Brain, and has a firm disbelief in the supernatural. His character often utters four catchphrases during episodes–"Wowsers!", at times of shock and complete surprise; "Go-Go-Gadget", which is often spoken before Gadget names the gadget he intends to use; "Is that you, Chief? You're where?", uttered when Chief Quimby calls Gadget on his next assignment; and "I'm always on duty", which is also said to Quimby before Gadget leaves for his assignment. He often introduces himself with, "My name is Inspector Gadget", and otherwise it is implied that "Inspector" is his actual first name (rather than a title) and "Gadget" his surname, but the 1999 movie implies that "Gadget" is a code name. His real name is never given in the cartoon, but in the French books/novelizations for kids of the Bibliothèque Rose collection, his name is stated as Aristide.
- Penny (Sophie in French) (voiced by Mona Marshall in the pilot episode, Cree Summer in Season 1 and Holly Berger in Season 2): Inspector Gadget's highly intelligent niece. She is the true brains behind Inspector Gadget's investigations, and the one responsible for foiling M.A.D.'s schemes, a fact only known to Brain. Her investigations are conducted in secret, in which she uses two pieces of technology–a hi-tech computer disguised as a book; and a special utility wristwatch, which she frequently uses to communicate with Brain and monitor her uncle's activities. Penny often gets kidnapped by M.A.D. when they catch her snooping into their affairs, but manages to escape with her technology or by calling on Brain for help.
- Brain (Finot in French) (voiced by Frank Welker): The family's anthropomorphic beagle, assists in investigations by secretly keeping Gadget out of danger, and on several occasions coming to Penny's aid when she needs him. The series' writers designed the character to be highly intelligent and resourceful, often becoming bipedal in order to operate under a number of disguises aimed at fooling Gadget and/or the M.A.D. Agents. A running gag is that Gadget will typically befriend M.A.D. Agents and remain oblivious to their attempts to kill him, while exclusively perceiving Brain as a M.A.D. Agent he needs to arrest. Brain is outfitted with a hi-tech collar that conceals a retractable video communications system linked to Penny's wristwatch, in which he communicates to her through a mixture of pantomime and physical gestures. By Season 2, Brain was using this video link to 'talk' to Penny in dog-talk reminiscent of Scooby-Doo.
- Chief Quimby (Chef Gontier in French) (voiced by John Stephenson in the pilot, Dan Hennessey in Season 1 and Maurice LaMarche in Season 2): Inspector Gadget's short-tempered boss. The chief of police in Metro City, Quimby specializes in the use of disguises in order to pass on a message containing Inspector Gadget's briefing for his next message, a frequent plot element used at the beginning of each episode, as well as seeing him towards the end to congratulate him on a job well done, never realizing that Inspector Gadget's niece is responsible for foiling Dr. Claw's plots or alerting him secretly to where he and the police need to be. As a running gag, Inspector Gadget is oblivious to the message's self-destruct element and returns it to his boss prior to it blowing up, always unintentionally and occasionally through sheer bad luck on Quimby's part. The character is frequently portrayed with a pipe in his mouth, is often on the receiving end of a mishap from Inspector Gadget's bumbling nature, and is accompanied by his own theme music during his main scene in the episode. His first name is never given in the cartoon, but in the french books/novelizations for kids of the Bibliothèque Rose collection, it is stated that his first name is Isidore.
- Dr. Claw (Docteur Gang in French) (voiced by Frank Welker and Don Francks): The leader of the evil M.A.D. organization. Dr. Claw often operates his schemes via a computer terminal, while accompanied by his pet cat M.A.D. Cat (a reference to James Bond villain Ernst Stavro Blofeld), usually either within a base that is often depicted as an old castle, or from within his personal craft the M.A.D. Mobile, a black-and-red vehicle that can transform between a car, jet, and submersible, which he always escapes in when his latest scheme has failed whilst he is on location at or near where it is being conducted. Dr. Claw considers Inspector Gadget to be his greatest nemesis, despite being aware of his idiocy, but does know about Penny and Brain's involvement in his missions; however, both he and his M.A.D. agents presume they are simply under orders by Inspector Gadget to spy on their operations, and are never fully aware that they are the real brains behind his schemes being thwarted. The character always uses his catchphrase—"I'll get you next time, Gadget! Next time!"—at the end of each episode (during the end credits), often to illustrate his desire for revenge against Inspector Gadget. He is never seen, aside from his arms.
- Corporal Capeman (voiced by Townsend Coleman): Inspector Gadget's sidekick, introduced in the second season. Capeman is a self-proclaimed superhero who acts in the manner of a stereotypical crime fighter; yet, despite being more observant of details than the Inspector, he is equally as inept at interpreting them. Capeman dislikes Brain and is occasionally mean to him, despite Brain getting him out of trouble. Capeman is obsessed with learning to fly and often mistakenly believes he has miraculously acquired the power of flight while in the midst of dire circumstances. Gadget almost always mispronounces Capeman's name as "Capman", while Penny calls him "Capey".

== Episodes ==
Season	Episodes	Originally released	
Season	Episodes	First released	Last released
Pilot		December 4, 1982	
1	65	September 5, 1983	December 2, 1983
2	21	September 30, 1985	November 13, 1985

== Production ==
=== Origin ===
In 1981, Inspector Gadget creator Andy Heyward left Hanna-Barbera and traveled to Paris to work with DIC Audiovisuel after being proposed by the company to do so. As the company wanted entertainment for the United States, Heyward combined ideas to originate Inspector Gadget. Many ideas were inspired by Dynomutt, Dog Wonder, Get Smart (Don Adams, the voice of Inspector Gadget, played Maxwell Smart in Get Smart), and The Six Million Dollar Man. Due to concerns that the show would not appeal to girls, Penny was created for the show. Brain was named to convey the idea that "he is smart while Inspector Gadget [is the opposite]."

=== Designs ===
When production started, the model of Inspector Gadget was broken down for gadgets that needed to be created. The original design of Inspector Gadget was done in Paris. It included helicopter blades and was based on Andy Heyward and one of the directors of the series. It was scrapped from the writers' confusion of the design, and production assistant Mike Maliani and Andy Heyward simplified the designs to avoid this. Gadget went through approximately 350 sketches before reaching his final design. Inspector Gadget originally had a mustache (as shown in the pilot). It was removed after DIC received a letter from MGM (which already acquired United Artists) that he looked too similar to Inspector Clouseau from Pink Panther.

=== Writers ===
Nelvana writer Peter Sauder was the head writer for season 1, which was co-produced by DiC. As Nelvana was no longer part of the production by season 2, the show was written by the DIC studio employees Eleanor Burian-Mohr, Mike O'Mahoney, Glen Egbert, and Jack Hanrahan. Hanrahan and Burian-Mohr would later write the Christmas special Inspector Gadget Saves Christmas

Due to various recurring elements in the series, the basic plot of each episode was often the same. The geographic location of each episode differed, and it provided for some variety in the series. The series effectively provided viewers with both comedic and dramatic moments. Despite the censorship standards for American animated series in effect during the 1970s and 1980s, the series also included elements of slapstick comedy. This was nearly forbidden at the time, but the censorship was less strict for a syndicated series.

=== Animation ===
Alongside The Care Bears Movie, Inspector Gadget was Nelvana's first foray into animation outsourcing.

=== Voice cast ===
The role of Inspector Gadget went through two different voice actors before Don Adams was cast. The first voice of Inspector Gadget was provided by Jesse White, but his voice characteristics did not test well. Gary Owens auditioned the voice of Inspector Gadget with ad-libs, including his catchphrase "Wowsers!". Eventually, producers decided to cast actor Don Adams in the role, re-recording all of Inspector Gadget's dialogue in the pilot from Jesse White and Gary Owens. (Note: In the DVD commentary Wowsers! A Retrospective Look At Inspector Gadget, Andy Heyward stated that Gary Owens was the first to voice Inspector Gadget before it went to Jesse White. It is unknown which source has accurate information.) Adams was seen as perfect, because he had played the original Maxwell Smart, the character that inspired Inspector Gadget.

Dr. Claw, M.A.D. Cat, and Brain were voiced by Frank Welker. Don Francks initially replaced Welker as Dr. Claw for 25 episodes following the pilot before Welker was called in to replace him for those episodes. Penny was originally voiced by Mona Marshall in the pilot and was subsequently portrayed by Don Francks' daughter, Cree Summer, for the rest of the first season in her first voice acting role.

In 2025, LaMarche revealed that a young Jim Carrey auditioned for the role of Corporal Capeman, ultimately getting beaten out by Townsend Coleman. LaMarche believes that had he won the role, as well as the title role of Disney's Bonkers, he probably would not have pursued a live action film career.

=== Music ===
The theme music was inspired by Edvard Grieg's movement "In the Hall of the Mountain King" and was composed by Shuki Levy. For many years, Levy had a partnership with his friend Haim Saban, with Levy composing the music and Saban running the business. Their record company, Saban Records, (now Saban Music Group) has provided music for many DiC cartoons and children's shows in the 1980s and 1990s, and is still running today. A soundtrack LP to accompany the series, named Inspecteur Gadget: Bande Originale de la Serie TV, was released in France in 1983 by Saban Records. Wagram Music made it available on online services such as Spotify and iTunes.

In her book Robot Takeover: 100 Iconic Robots of Myth, Popular Culture & Real Life, Scissor Sisters singer Ana Matronic says she considers the theme music to be widely recognized around the world. The series was a "global hit" and its theme song became "iconic". She notes that copies of the original television soundtrack had become extremely rare by 2010.

== Release ==
=== Broadcast ===
The original Inspector Gadget television series was the first production of DIC Entertainment intended for American television. The series first premiered as an exclusive pilot on December 4, 1982. On March 14, 1983, it was announced the series would be released in late 1983, consisting of 65 episodes. The earliest-known debut was on September 5, 1983, on WFSL-TV in Lansing, Michigan. According to the Syndication Leaders chart in Electronic Media issued on March 1, 1984, the series was renewed for a second season. On August 20, 1984, Television/Radio Age explained that the series was renewed for a second season due to its success, ordering 20 to 25 additional episodes. On October 15, 1984, Broadcasting Magazine announced that the second season would begin in September 1985. The second season debuted on September 30, 1985, and ended on November 13, 1985.

Repeats of the series briefly appeared on CBS's Saturday morning cartoon lineup from 1991 to 1992. Nickelodeon also aired reruns of the show from October 1, 1987, until August 31, 1992, and again from November 4, 1996, until April 29, 2000. Various stations, such as Global Television Network, and The Family Channel aired Inspector Gadget until the late-1990s. It started rerunning on MeTV Toons on June 25, 2024, on its launch day.

=== Home media ===
During the 1980s and 1990s, several VHS tapes of the series were released by labels such as Family Home Entertainment (distributed by MGM/UA Home Video and International Video Entertainment) and Kideo Video (distributed by Karl-Lorimar Home Video). In 1999, Buena Vista Home Video released Inspector Gadget: Gadget's Greatest Gadgets, a direct-to-video feature that contained three episodes of the TV series. On July 6, 2004, Sterling Entertainment released a VHS/DVD called Inspector Gadget: The Gadget Files. The release contains the show's pilot Winter Olympics alongside the first two episodes of the series, which are "Monster Lake" and "Down on the Farm".

In 2006, Shout! Factory acquired the rights to the series and subsequently released Inspector Gadget: The Original Series, a four-disc set featuring the first 22 episodes of the series on DVD on April 25, 2006. On September 9, 2009, 20th Century Fox Home Entertainment released a single-disc DVD, Inspector Gadget: The Go Go Gadget Collection which features ten episodes from the series. On May 24, 2013 TV Shows on DVD noted that New Video Group had acquired the home video rights to the series. New Video Group released the complete series on DVD in Region 1 for the very first time in four volume sets on October 8, 2013. They also re-released Inspector Gadget Saves Christmas on October 29, 2013. The series is available on Amazon Prime Video for purchase. Inspector Gadget can be streamed on Paramount+, The Roku Channel, and Pluto TV.

== Reception ==
=== Critical response ===
Emily Ashby of Common Sense Media gave the series four stars out of five, writing, "Bumbling bionic detective offers worry-free laughs for kids."

=== Ratings ===
On November 28, 1983, Broadcasting Magazine reported that Inspector Gadget tied with Woman to Woman and Hour Magazine at No. 5 for Monday-to-Friday daytime programming in independent stations, with an average of a 7% share on each three stations. On May 7, 1984, an advertisement revealed that Inspector Gadget appeared in 16 of the Top 20 markets and increased its Nielsen rating by 37% from October 1983 to February 1984. On August 20, 1984, an advertisement from McNaught Syndication Inc. reported that Inspector Gadget was seen in the Top 20 of 19 markets and experienced an average increase of 56% in Kids 2–11 in 16 markets and 69% in Kids 6–11 in 17 markets from the previous year. Television/Radio Age also reported that the series ranked at No. 8 in the kids' animation category, getting a 7.9 Nielsen rating with kids and a 2.1 Nielsen household rating with a share of 11%. According to Henry Siegel, chairman of Lexington Broadcast Services, the series' success led to produce the 1984 animated adaptation of Heathcliff.

On December 10, 1984, an advertisement from LBS Communications revealed that Inspector Gadget rose from being the No. 26 to No. 4 syndicated kids show in one year. It was also revealed that since October 1983, it rose 156% in ratings, 189% in shares, 89% in homes, 100% in Kids 2-11, and 78% in Kids 6-11. As of May 28, 1985, the original series was seen in 112 stations that covered 85% American households. In May 1986, a "Fat Cats" advertisement from DIC Audiovisuel revealed that Inspector Gadget topped all other kids cartoons in Los Angeles, California, with an 18 Nielsen rating for kids. It was also revealed that its rating for Kids 2-11 increased by 25% from November 1985 to February 1986.

== Franchise ==
=== Live-action films ===
Inspector Gadget was adapted into a 1999 live action film by Disney starring Matthew Broderick as the titular character, Dabney Coleman as Chief Quimby, Michelle Trachtenberg as Penny, and Rupert Everett as Dr. Claw, with Gadget's original voice actor, Don Adams, as Brain in a post-credits scene. The film underperformed at the box office and was panned by both critics and fans, earning a 21% approval rating on Rotten Tomatoes.

A direct-to-video sequel was released in 2003. Broderick did not reprise his role as the title character; he was replaced by French Stewart. Elaine Hendrix was the lead female character as G2, and Caitlin Wachs portrayed Penny replacing Trachtenberg. D. L. Hughley reprises his role as the Gadgetmobile; he is the only star from the first film who appears in the sequel.

=== Books ===
In 2011, a new Inspector Gadget comic book was published in the United States by Viper Comics. Written by Dale Mettam and illustrated by José Cobá, the style of the book is based on the original 1983 television show. A preview comic was released on May 7, 2011, as part of the Free Comic Book Day, before the entire story was officially published as a 48-page book in August.

In 2024, the author Daniel Gallego publishes with the Spanish publishing house “Cucúrucho ediciones” the first official licensed art book of the series for its 40th anniversary entitled “The Art Of Inspector Gadget” The work tells chronologically the story of the founding of the DIC studio, the creation of the characters, the production of the pilot episode, the development of the series during its first and second seasons, revealing unpublished production drawings, storyboards, photographs of the team...etc.

The book gathers the testimonies of most of the original team, with the participation of Jean Chalopin, Bernard Deyriès, Andy Heyward, Brian Lemay, Jean Barbaud and many other artists who worked on the series as animation directors, character designers, scriptwriters, storyboard artists and others.

The book also has a foreword by the son of the series director, Bruno Bianchi.

=== CGI reboot ===
A new CGI animated Inspector Gadget TV series was developed in 2012. It was commissioned by Teletoon and put into pre-production by Cookie Jar Entertainment. It was mentioned by Ray Sharma, the CEO of XMG Studio, in January 2012. Sharma described how the success of the game had resulted in a new TV series being in the making: "We did 1 million downloads in a week, and it's reinvigorated the TV brand with a new TV series in production." In September 2012, Cookie Jar issued a short press release about the upcoming series, as part of the advertising for it during the MIPCOM market that October, stating: "Cookie Jar Entertainment is celebrating Inspector Gadget's 30th anniversary with the launch of a brand-new series with its Canadian broadcast partner Teletoon. The series will again revolve around the iconic bionic bumbling detective." On June 9, 2013, Teletoon officially announced the reboot series with two press pictures of Inspector Gadget's new look as well as a press release. The TV series is produced by DHX Media, which purchased Cookie Jar Group in 2012. The series premiered on Boomerang in Australia on January 5, 2015.

=== Unproduced live-action reboot ===
In May 2015, it was announced that a new film with a rebooted version of the character was in the works. Like the live-action movies, it would be by Disney, with Dan Lin producing it. In October 2019, Mikey Day and Streeter Seidell were hired to write the film.

== See also ==
- List of French animated television series

== Sources ==
- Matronic, Ana (2015). "Inspector Gadget". Robot Takeover: 100 Iconic Robots of Myth, Popular Culture & Real Life. Hachette. ISBN 978-1-84403-869-5.
- Perlmutter, David (2014). "Sweet and Sour (1980–1990)". America Toons In: A History of Television Animation. McFarland & Company. ISBN 978-1-4766-1488-5.
- Rowan, Terry M. (2016). "Inspector Gadget". Character-Based Film Series, Part 1. Lulu. ISBN 978-1-365-42105-1.
- Scott, John (2014). "Cyborg". Dictionary of Sociology, Fourth Edition. Oxford University Press. ISBN 978-0-19-968358-1.
- Stoffman, Daniel (2002). The Nelvana Story: Thirty Animated Years. Nelvana Publishing Limited/Kids Can Press. ISBN 1-894786-00-9.
