= Andy Heyward =

Producer, writer, CEO

- Born: Andrew B. Heyward; February 19, 1949 (age 77); New York City, U.S.
- Occupations: Producer, writer, CEO
- Years active: 1976–present
- Spouse: Evelyn Heyward (m. 1981)
- Children: 4

Andrew B. Heyward (born February 19, 1949) is an American media executive and animator who is CEO of Kartoon Studios, formerly known as Genius Brands International. He previously worked at defunct animation studio and production company DIC Entertainment as chairman and CEO.

== Early life ==
Heyward was born in New York City, the son of Sylvia (née Block) and Louis M. "Deke" Heyward, who was vice president of development at leading entertainment companies such as Four Star International and Barry & Enright Productions, as well as senior vice president for defunct leading cartoon company, Hanna-Barbera.

== Career ==
Andy Heyward's upbringing was robust with access to the entertainment elite, including his first start as an assistant for animator Joe Barbera of Hanna-Barbera on Scooby's All-Star Laff-A-Lympics. In 1986, Heyward took the lead of DIC Entertainment after he and other investors performed a buyout of majority shares owned by the Compagnie Luxembourgeoise de Télédiffusion (now RTL Group, owned by Bertelsmann). He subsequently bought the remaining shares owned by Jean Chalopin, founder of the French company DIC Audiovisuel. Heyward eventually sold a majority interest in DIC to Capital Cities/ABC in 1993, forming a limited partnership company called DIC Entertainment L.P. CC/ABC that was later purchased by The Walt Disney Company in 1996. In 2000, with two venture capital firms, Heyward re-purchased DIC Entertainment. In 2008, Heyward sold DIC Entertainment to Cookie Jar Group.

In 2009, he founded A Squared Entertainment (A2) with his wife, Amy. In 2013, the company merged with Genius Brands to form Genius Brands International (now as Kartoon Studios), with Heyward as CEO.
