= List of programs broadcast by Fox Kids =

This is a list of television programs broadcast by Fox Kids around the world.

== Australia ==
- 2gether
- 7th Heaven
- Action Man
- The Adventures of Blinky Bill
- The Adventures of Dawdle the Donkey
- The Adventures of Sinbad
- The All New Captain Kangaroo
- The Avengers: United They Stand
- Bad Dog
- Barney & Friends
- Batman
- Batman of the Future
- Batmania
- Beast Machines: Transformers
- Beast Wars: Transformers
- Beetleborgs
- Beverly Hills, 90210
- Beyblade
- Big Guy and Rusty the Boy Robot
- Big Wolf on Campus
- Blake and Mortimer
- Bob Morane
- Braceface
- Breaker High
- Bruno the Kid
- Budgie the Little Helicopter
- Butt-Ugly Martians
- Button Nose
- C Bear and Jamal
- City Guys
- Clueless
- Cro
- The Cubeez
- Cubix
- Cybernet
- CyberZone
- Deepwater Black
- Dennis the Menace
- Diabolik
- Digimon: Digital Monsters (Note: An umbrella name for Digimon Adventure, Digimon Adventure 02, and Digimon Tamers. Digimon Frontier would only be shown on non-US Fox Kids blocks.)
- Dinky Dog
- Dinosaurs
- Dinozaurs
- Donkey Kong Country
- Dragon Flyz
- Dragon Tales
- Eek! The Cat
- Eerie, Indiana: The Other Dimension
- Escape from Jupiter
- Evolution: The Animated Series
- Extreme Dinosaurs
- Extreme Ghostbusters
- Fantastic Four
- Farscape
- Flint the Time Detective
- Flying Rhino Junior High
- Fun House
- Galidor
- Godzilla: The Series
- Goosebumps
- Groundling Marsh
- Heavy Gear: The Animated Series
- Hercules: The Legendary Journeys
- Hi-5
- The Hooley Dooleys
- The Hughleys
- Hyper
- The Incredible Hulk
- Insektors
- Iron Man
- Just Deal
- Kangoo Juniors
- The Kids from Room 402
- Kong: The Animated Series
- Lavender Castle
- Life with Louie
- Lift Off
- Li'l Horrors
- Mad Jack the Pirate
- The Magician
- Max Steel
- Medabots
- Meeow!
- Mega Babies
- Men in Black: The Series
- Mighty Morphin Alien Rangers
- Mighty Morphin Power Rangers
- Milo's Bug Quest
- Misguided Angels
- Mon Colle Knights
- Monster Rancher
- Moomin
- Mortal Kombat: Defenders of the Realm
- The Mr. Potato Head Show
- My So-Called Life
- Mystic Knights of Tir Na Nog
- The Nanny
- NASCAR Racers
- The New Addams Family
- Nilus the Sandman
- Ninja Turtles: The Next Mutation
- Oggy and the Cockroaches
- Our Hero
- The Parkers
- Pecola
- Phantom Investigators
- Pocket Dragon Adventures
- Power Rangers in Space
- Power Rangers Lightspeed Rescue
- Power Rangers Ninja Storm
- Power Rangers Lost Galaxy
- Power Rangers Time Force
- Power Rangers Turbo
- Power Rangers Wild Force
- Power Rangers Zeo
- Power Stone
- The Raccoons
- Return to Jupiter
- Rimba's Island
- The Ripping Friends
- Robot Wars
- Robot Wars: Extreme
- Roswell Conspiracies: Aliens, Myths and Legends
- Roughnecks: Starship Troopers Chronicles
- Rude Dog and the Dweebs
- The Saddle Club
- Sailor Moon
- Salty's Lighthouse
- Sesame Park Snippets
- Secret Life of Toys
- Scary But True
- Screech Owls
- Shadow Raiders
- Shin-chan
- Shinzo
- Silver Surfer
- Sky Dancers
- Skysurfer Strike Force
- So Little Time
- Space Goofs
- Spider-Man
- Spider-Man Unlimited
- Starla & the Jewel Riders
- State of Grace
- Super Duper Sumos
- Super Rupert
- Sweet Valley High
- Tabaluga
- Tales from the Cryptkeeper
- Teknoman
- The Tick
- The Tidings
- The Tomorrow People
- Totally Tooned In
- Transformers: Robots in Disguise
- Uh Oh!
- Ultimate Book of Spells
- Voltron: The Third Dimension
- Walter Melon
- Weird-Ohs
- Weird Science
- What About Mimi?
- What's with Andy?
- Wizards' Tales
- Witch World
- Wowser
- Wunschpunsch
- X-Men
- Xyber 9: New Dawn

=== Specials ===
- 2001 Teen Choice Awards
- 2002 Billboard Music Awards
- The Christmas Takeover
- The (Insert Your Name Here) Show
- Lights, Camera, Fox Kids!

== Europe ==
- Black Hole High
- The Breakfast Bash With Larry & Lee (UK and Ireland only)
- Cybergirl
- Diabolik
- Dragon Ball
- Flea-bag & Friends
- Fox Kids Cup
- Gadget & the Gadgetinis
- Hamtaro
- Jackie Chan Adventures
- Jacob Two-Two
- The Kids from Room 402
- Let's Go Quintuplets!
- Martin Mystery
- Medabots
- MegaMan NT Warrior
- Moville Mysteries (UK and Ireland only)
- Pat & Mat
- Pecola
- Pig City
- Pokémon
- Pucca (TV shorts)
- RoboRoach
- Shaman King
- Shin-chan
- Shinzo
- So Little Time (UK and Ireland only)
- Sonic X
- Teenage Mutant Ninja Turtles
- Totally Spies!
- Tracey McBean
- Tutenstein
- What's with Andy?
- The World of Tosh (UK and Ireland only)
- Wunschpunsch

== France ==
- Action Man (Note: Program transitioned to Jetix in France.)
- The Avengers: United They Stand
- Bananas in Pyjamas
- Batman: The Animated Series
- Bob in a Bottle (premiered 1998)
- Bobby's World (premiered November 15, 1997)
- Cardcaptor Sakura (premiered September 4, 1999)
- Chocotte Minute (short series) (premiered January 25, 2003)
- Cybergirl
- Dennis the Menace
- Diabolik (premiered 1998)
- Digimon (premiered September 2000) (Note: Digimon Tamers transitioned to Jetix in France.)
- Donkey Kong Country
- Doraemon
- Dragon Flyz
- Eagle Riders (premiered 1996)
- Eerie, Indiana (premiered July 31, 1999)
- Evolution: The Animated Series (premiered November 13, 2001)
- Fantaghirò
- Flint the Time Detective (premiered October 2001)
- Gadget & the Gadgetinis
- Goosebumps
- Hamtaro (premiered November 2002)
- Heathcliff
- Hello Kitty's Furry Tale Theater (premiered September 30, 1997)
- Hello Kitty's Paradise (premiered February 15, 2001)
- Inspector Gadget
- The Incredible Hulk
- Iznogoud
- Jam Hot (short series)
- Jason and the Heroes of Mount Olympus
- Jayce and the Wheeled Warriors
- Jellabies (short series)
- Jim Button
- Journey to the Heart of the World
- Kangoo
- Kangoo Juniors (premiered March 10, 2002)
- Karine and Ari
- The Kids from Room 402 (premiered October 8, 1999)
- Let's Go Quintuplets! (premiered September 2003)
- Life with Louie (premiered December 17, 1994)
- The Littl' Bits (premiered Late 1990s)
- Mad Jack the Pirate (premiered August 31, 1999)
- Magic Adventures of Mumfie
- Magical DoReMi (premiered September 2000)
- M.A.S.K.
- Masked Rider
- Medabots
- Mega Babies
- Mighty Morphin Power Rangers (premiered April 12, 1994 and November 15, 1997)
- Monster Rancher (premiered 2001)
- NASCAR Racers (premiered November 19, 1999)
- The New Addams Family
- Ninja Turtles: The Next Mutation
- Noozles (premiered 1998)
- Pecola
- Pig City
- Pinocchio: The Series
- Pocket Dragon Adventures
- Pokémon (series 1 only) (premiered September 1999)
- Power Rangers Ninja Storm (premiered November 16, 2003)
- Power Rangers Time Force (premiered January 9, 2002)
- Power Rangers Wild Force (premiered 2003)
- Princess Sissi
- Princesse Shéhérazade
- RoboRoach
- Saban's Adventures of the Little Mermaid
- Saban's Adventures of Oliver Twist
- Saban's Gulliver's Travels
- Sailor Moon
- Samurai Pizza Cats (premiered 1997)
- The Secret Files of the Spy Dogs (premiered 1997)
- Shaman King (premiered 2003)
- Shin-chan
- Shinzo (premiered 2001)
- Silver Surfer (premiered 1998)
- So Little Time
- Sonic X
- S.O.S. Croco!
- Spider-Man Unlimited
- Spider-Woman
- Supermodels: Lights, Camera, Action
- Thomas & Friends
- The Three Friends and Jerry
- Three Little Ghosts (premiered 1997)
- The Tick (premiered November 15, 1997)
- Totally Spies!
- The Ugly Duckling (premiered 1999)
- VR Troopers
- Walter Melon
- Wheel Squad
- What's with Andy?
- Where on Earth Is Carmen Sandiego? (premiered 1995)
- The Why Why Family
- Wunschpunsch
- X-Men (premiered November 15, 1997)
- Zoe and Charlie

=== Movies ===
- Cardcaptor Sakura: The Movie (premiered May 4, 2004)

== Germany ==
- Benjamin the Elephant (Note: Program transitioned to Jetix in Germany.)
- Beverly Hills Teens
- Big Bad Beetleborgs
- Big Wolf on Campus
- Bobby's World
- Braceface
- Bumpety Boo
- Butt-Ugly Martians
- Care Bears
- The Cramp Twins
- Dennis the Menace
- Digimon
- Diplodos
- Eerie, Indiana: The Other Dimension
- Flint the Time Detective
- Ganbare, Kickers!
- Goosebumps
- Jin Jin and the Panda Patrol
- Little Mouse on the Prairie
- Martin Mystery
- Medabots
- Mega Babies
- MegaMan NT Warrior
- Pig City
- Pokémon
- Popeye (1933)
- Popeye (1960)
- Power Rangers Lightspeed Rescue
- Power Rangers Lost Galaxy
- Power Rangers Wild Force
- Rotten Ralph
- Shaman King
- Shin-chan
- The Simpsons
- So Little Time
- Spheriks
- The Three Friends and Jerry
- Three Little Ghosts
- Totally Spies!
- The Triplets
- What's with Andy?
- Wilf the Witch's Dog
- Wowser
- Yu-Gi-Oh! Duel Monsters

== Greece ==
- Bad Dog (Μπαντ Ντογκ / Το Ζωηρό Σκυλί)
- Batman Beyond (Ο Μπάτμαν του Μέλλοντος)
- Bobby's World (Ο Κόσμος του Μπόμπι) (Note: Program transitioned to Jetix in Greece.)
- Braceface (Σιδερένιο Χαμόγελο)
- Breaker High
- Camp Candy (Κατασκήνωση Κάντι)
- Dennis the Menace (Ντένις, ο Τρομερός)
- Diabolik (Diabolik: Στα Ίχνη του Πάνθηρα / Κεραυνός)
- Dungeons & Dragons (Μάγοι και Δράκοι)
- Eek! The Cat (Ικ ο Τρελόγατος)
- Gadget & the Gadgetinis (Αστυνόμος Σαΐνης & Μικροί Σαΐνηδες)
- Jason and the Heroes of Mount Olympus (O Ιάσονας και οι Θεοί του Ολύμπου)
- Jim Button (Τζιμ Μπάτον)
- The Kids from Room 402 (Οι Μπόμπιρες του 402 / Αίθουσα 402)
- Life with Louie (Η Ζωή με τον Λούη)
- Mad Jack the Pirate (Τρελο-Τζακ ο Πειρατής)
- The Magic School Bus (Το Μαγικό Σχολικό)
- Mary-Kate and Ashley in Action! (Μέρι Κέιτ και Άσλι, οι Δίδυμες Όλσεν)
- Mighty Morphin Power Rangers (Πάουερ Ρέηντζερς)
- Monster Rancher (Μάνστερ Ράντσερ / Η Φάρμα των Τεράτων)
- ¡Mucha Lucha! (Mucha Lucha)
- NASCAR Racers (Οδηγοί Πίστας)
- Oggy and the Cockroaches (Ο Όγκυ και οι Κατσαρίδες)
- Pecola
- Pig City (Γουρουνόπολη)
- Power Rangers Zeo (Ζίο Πάουερ Ρέιντζερς)
- RoboRoach (Ρομποκατσαρίδας)
- Saban's Adventures of the Little Mermaid (H Μικρή Γοργόνα)
- The Secret Files of the Spy Dogs (Σκυλιά σε Μυστικές Αποστολές)
- Shaman King (Σαμάνος Πρίγκιπας)
- Shinzo
- So Little Time (Μαίρη-Κέιτ και Άσλι: Δίδυμοι Μπελάδες)
- Spider-Man: The Animated Series (Σπάιντερμαν, ο Άνθρωπος Αράχνη)
- State of Grace (Ο Κόσμος της Γκρέις)
- Super Dave: Daredevil for Hire (Ο Τρομερός Ντέιβ)
- Swamp Thing (Το Πλάσμα των Βάλτων)
- Taz-Mania (O Δαίμονας της Ταζμανίας)
- The Three Friends and Jerry (Τρεις Φίλοι κι ο Τζέρι / Η Συμμορία και ο Τζέρι)
- The Tick (Ο Γαλάζιος Σίφουνας)
- Toonsylvania
- Totally Spies!
- Transformers: Robots in Disguise (Transformers: Αυτοκίνητα-Ρομπότ)
- Walter Melon (Γουόλτερ Μέλον)
- What's with Andy? (Κάτι Τρέχει με τον Άντυ)
- The Why Why Family (Θέλω να Μάθω Γιατί)
- Wunschpunsch (Άμπρα Κατάμπρα)
- X-Men: The Animated Series (Οι Αήττητοι X-Men / Ομάδα Χ)

=== Movies/Specials ===
- My Life as a Babysitter

== India ==
- Bobby's World
- Dennis the Menace
- Dungeons & Dragons
- Iron Man
- RoboCop
- Samurai Pizza Cats
- Silver Surfer
- Small Wonder
- The Tick
- X-Men

== Israel ==
- Action Man (לַהַק סדרה)
- Angela Anaconda (אנג'לה אנקונדה)
- Argai: The Prophecy (ארגאי)
- Bad Dog (נזק)
- Bailey Kipper's P.O.V. (ביילי קיפר)
- Beverly Hills Teens (צעירי בברלי הילס)
- Bobby's World (עולמו של בובי)
- Braceface (מגושרת)
- Butt-Ugly Martians (פחצופים ממארס)
- Camp Candy (מחנה טופי)
- Cancelled Burgas Met (ביטל בורגס מט)
- Care Bears (דובוני אכפת לי)
- The Care Bears Family (דובוני אכפת לי)
- Comi Comi (קומי קומי)
- C.O.P.S. (שוטרים וגנבים)
- Dennis the Menace (דני שובבני)
- Digimon (דיג'ימון)
- Dinozaurs (דינוזאורים)
- Doraemon (דורימון)
- Dungeons & Dragons (מבוכים ודרקונים)
- Eerie, Indiana (אירי אינדיאנה)
- Even Stevens (אצל סטיבנס)
- Freaky Stories (מקק ותולעת)
- Generation O! (!מולי או)
- Gur and Oah (גור ואוח)
- Hamtaro (המטארו)
- The Incredible Hulk (האלק האיום)
- Inspector Gadget (גאדג'ט מפקח)
- Iron Man (איירון מן)
- Iznogoud (רשע כזה)
- KitchenBahim (מטבחבחים)
- The Kids from Room 402 (כיתה 402)
- King Arthur and the Knights of Justice (המלך ארתור ואבירי הצדק)
- Little Mouse on the Prairie (עכברונים קטנים בערבה)
- Lizzie McGuire (ליזי מקגווייר)
- Medabots (מדבוט)
- Moolah Beach (מולה ביץ)
- Pecola (פקולה)
- Peter Pan: The Animated Series (פיטר פן)
- Power Rangers Lightspeed Rescue (פאוור ריינג'רס צוות הצלה)
- Power Rangers Time Force (פאוור ריינג'רס כוח הזמן)
- Princess Sissi (סיסי הנסיכה)
- Radio Active (רדיו אקטיבי)
- Rebelde Way (המורדים)
- The Ripping Friends (האחים ריפינג)
- Saban's Adventures of the Little Mermaid (בת הים הקטנה)
- Saban's Adventures of Oliver Twist (אוליבר טוויסט)
- Samurai Pizza Cats (החתולים הסמוראים)
- So Little Time (מזל תאומות)
- Sonic X (סוניק X)
- Spider-Man: The Animated Series (ספיידרמן)
- State of Grace (חנה וגרייס)
- Super Pig (סופר-פיג)
- Sylvanian Families (הרפתקאות ביער המשאלות)
- Tenko and the Guardians of the Magic (הנסיכה טנקו)
- X-Men: The Animated Series (אקס-מן)
- Walter Melon (וולטר מלון)
- The Why Why Family (תשאלו את ויקטור)
- Wowser (עוגי דוגי)
- Wunschpunsch (אונץ' פונץ')

=== Movies ===
- Digimon: The Movie (דיג'ימון: הסרט)

== Italy ==
- Action Man (Note: Program transitioned to Jetix in Italy.)
- The Adventures of Hutch the Honeybee (Le avventure dell’Ape Magà) (premiered November 24, 1996)
- Adventures of Sonic the Hedgehog (Le Avventure di Sonic)
- The Adventures of Super Mario Bros. 3 (Le avventure di Super Mario)
- Argai: The Prophecy (Argai) (premiered 2002)
- The Avengers: United They Stand (I Vendicatori)
- Big Bad Beetleborgs (Beetleborgs - Quando si scatena il vento dell'avventura)
- Bad Dog (Bad Dog - Un cane che più cane non c'è)
- Beverly Hills Teens
- Biker Mice from Mars (Biker Mice da Marte) (premiered 2003)
- Black Hole High (premiered October 2004)
- Bobby's World (Il mondo di Bobby)
- The Bots Master
- Conan the Adventurer (Conan)
- Cybergirl
- Dennis the Menace (Denny)
- Dungeons & Dragons (premiered 2003)
- Eek! Stravaganza (Fleek! Stravaganza)
- Eerie, Indiana (Gli acchiappamostri)
- The Fairly OddParents (Due fantagenitori) (premiered December 2, 2002)
- Fairy Tale Police Department (Polizia Dipartimento Favole) (premiered Fall 2004)
- Fantastic Four (I fantastici quattro)
- Flint the Time Detective (Flint, a spasso nel tempo)
- Funky Cops (premiered October 2004)
- Gloria's House (A casa di Gloria) (premiered July 1, 2004)
- Goosebumps (Piccoli brividi)
- Growing Up With Hello Kitty (Hello Kitty) (premiered 2001)
- Happy Ness: The Secret of the Loch (Tra le onde del lago incantato)
- Heathcliff (Isidoro)
- The Incredible Hulk (1982) (L'incredibile Hulk (1982))
- The Incredible Hulk (1996) (L'incredibile Hulk (1996))
- Inspector Gadget (L'ispettore Gadget)
- Iron Man
- Iznogoud (Chi la fa l'aspetti)
- Jim Button (Jim Bottone)
- Kangoo (premiered 1999)
- The Kids from Room 402 (I ragazzi della 402)
- Knights of the Zodiac (I Cavalieri dello Zodiaco)
- Madeline (Pennellate di poesia per Madeline)
- Mary-Kate and Ashley in Action!
- Mighty Morphin Power Rangers (Power Rangers)
- The Mighty Thor (Il mitico Thor) (premiered 2004)
- Monster Farm (Quella strana fattoria) (premiered 2002)
- Mr. Bean: The Animated Series (Mr. Bean) (premiered December 6, 2003)
- My Parents Are Aliens (Papà e mamma sono alieni) (premiered November 2003)
- Power Rangers in Space (premiered 1999)
- Power Rangers Lightspeed Rescue (premiered September 2002)
- Power Rangers Lost Galaxy
- Power Rangers Ninja Storm (premiered November 1, 2004)
- Power Rangers Time Force (premiered October 2002)
- Power Rangers Turbo
- Power Rangers Wild Force (premiered 2003)
- Power Rangers Zeo
- Rebelde Way (episode 1 only)
- Sherlock Holmes in the 22nd Century (Sherlock Holmes - Indagini dal futuro)
- The Secret Files of the Spy Dogs (Spy Dogs) (premiered 2003)
- Shinzo (premiered Fall 2003)
- Silver Surfer (premiered November 2003)
- So Little Time (Due gemelle e un maggiordomo) (premiered May 2004)
- Sonic the Hedgehog (Sonic) (premiered 2004)
- Sonic X (premiered October 4, 2004)
- Sophie and Virginia (Sophie e Vivianne: due sorelle e un'avventura)
- Spider-Man (1981) (Spiderman, l'Uomo Ragno)
- Spider-Man: The Animated Series (1994) (Spiderman)
- Spider-Man and His Amazing Friends (L'Uomo Ragno e i suoi fantastici amici)
- Spider-Man Unlimited
- Super Duper Sumos
- The Super Mario Bros. Super Show!/The Legend of Zelda (Super Mario/Un regno incantato per Zelda)
- Super Mario World (Le avventure di Super Mario)
- Super Pig
- Sweet Valley High
- Teknoman (premiered 2003)
- Tenko and the Guardians of the Magic (Trucchi, magie e illusioni per una dolce principessa)
- The Tick (premiered 1997)
- Totally Spies! (Che magnifiche spie!)
- Tracey McBean
- The Transformers
- Transformers: Armada
- Transformers: Robots in Disguise
- The Triplets (Tre gemelle e una strega)
- Tutenstein (premiered November 2, 2004)
- Ulysses 31 (Ulysse 31) (premiered July 2004)
- Walter Melon (Walter eroe a tempo perso) (premiered 2003)
- The Why Why Family (La famiglia dei perchè)
- Wicked! (premiered Fall 2003)
- Winx Club (2003-2005) (first 2 seasons only)
- X-Men (Insuperabili X-Men)
- Xena: Warrior Princess (Xena principessa guerriera) (premiered October 4, 2004)
- Young Hercules (premiered October 4, 2004)

== Latin America ==
Title	Spanish title	Note(s)	Source(s)
64 Zoo Lane	La Calle del Zoológico 64		(Note: As part of It's Itsy Bitsy Time! block (formerly Mini Fox Blox block).)
The 7th Portal	El Séptimo Portal	premiered May 1, 2000	
Action Man		premiered September 4, 2000	(Note: Program transitioned to Jetix in Latin America.)
The Addams Family (1964)	Los Locos Addams		(Note: Also part of Insomnia (Insomnio) block.)
The Addams Family (1992)	Los Locos Addams la serie animada		
The Adventures of Hutch the Honeybee	La Abejita Hutch	premiered November 24, 1996	
Adventures of the Little Koala	As Aventuras do Pequeno Koala		
The Adventures of Sam & Max: Freelance Police	Sam y Max Policías Independientes	premiered November 20, 1998	
The Adventures of Timmy the Tooth	Las Aventuras de Timmy el Diente		
The Adventures of Shirley Holmes	Las Aventuras de Shirley Holmes	premiered November 20, 1998	
Albert the Fifth Musketeer	Alberto, el quinto Musketero		
The All New Captain Kangaroo	El nuevo Capitán Canguro	premiered November 20, 1998	
Amigovios		premiered November 11, 1997	
The Animal Shelf			
Angela Anaconda		premiered March 3, 2000	(Note: As part of Super-Crazy (Super-Chiflados) block.) (Note: As part of Girl Power block.)
Attack of the Killer Tomatoes	El ataque de los tomates asesinos	premiered November 20, 1996	(Note: Also on the Fox Kids block.)
The Avengers: United They Stand	Los Vengadores	premiered May 7, 2000	
Baby Follies			
Bad Dog	Las Travesuras de Barky		
Batman			
BattleTech: The Animated Series	BattleTech		
Beyblade		premiered October 7, 2002	(Note: As part of Anime Invasion block.)
Big Bad Beetleborgs	Los Beetleborgs	premiered November 24, 1996	
Big Guy and Rusty the Boy Robot	Big Guy y Rusty el niño robot		
Bit the Cupid	Bit el cupído	premiered November 20, 1998	
Biker Mice from Mars	Los Motorratones de marte	premiered November 20, 1996	
Birdz			
Black Hole High	El Colegio del Agujero Negro	premiered October 31, 2003; seasons 1 and 2 only	(Note: As part of Mysteria block.)
Bobby's World	El Mundo de Bobby	premiered November 20, 1996	
Braceface	Dientes de Lata	premiered June 20, 2001	
Breaker High	Secundaria a bordo	premiered June 20, 2001	
Bruno the Kid	Bruno el Espía	premiered February 6, 1999	
Budgie the Little Helicopter	Budgie, el pequeño helicóptero		
Bureau of Alien Detectors	Oficina de Detectores de Extraterrestres		
Button Nose		premiered November 11, 1997	
C Bear and Jamal	C-Bear y Jamal	premiered November 11, 1997	
Capitol Critters	Max Y Sus Amigos		(Note: Fox Kids block only.)
Charley and Mimmo			
The Cramp Twins	Los Cramp/Los Mellizos Cramp		
Creepy Crawlers	Insectos Mutantes/Bichos mutantes	premiered November 20, 1996	
Crocadoo			
Cyber Team in Akihabara	Cyber Team en Akihabara		
Cybersix			
Dan Dare: Pilot of the Future	Dan Dare	premiered December 22, 2001	
Dance Academy	Academia De Danza/Academia de baile	premiered November 20, 1996	
Dennis the Menace	Daniel el travieso		
Diabolik		premiered July 5, 1999	
Digimon		premiered July 1, 2000	
Dilbert			
Dinozaurs	DinoZaurs La Serie		
Donkey Kong Country	El país de Donkey Kong		
Dragon Flyz	Dragonáutas	premiered November 24, 1996	
Dungeons & Dragons	Calabozos y Dragones		
Eagle Riders		premiered November 23, 1996	
Earthworm Jim			
Eek! The Cat	Eek! el Gato	premiered November 20, 1996	
Eerie, Indiana		premiered November 20, 1998	
Eerie, Indiana: The Other Dimension			
Escaflowne			
Evolution: The Animated Series	Evolución		
The Fairly OddParents	Los Padrinos Mágicos	seasons 1-3 only; premiered January 1, 2003	
Fantastic Four	Los Cuatro Fantásticos/Los 4 Fantásticos	premiered November 24, 1996	
Fantomcat	Fantogato	premiered November 23, 1996	
Fantômette	Fantomette	premiered June 7, 1999	
Flaxen Rat & Diegger Moleson			
Flight Squad	Escuadrón del Aire		
Flint the Time Detective	Flint, El detective del Tiempo		
Fighting Foodons			
Fox Kids Cup	Copa Fox Kids		
Fox Kids Miniworld	Minimundo Fox Kids		
From Foot to Head	De Pies a Cabeza	premiered November 11, 1997	
Funky Cops	Los Policías Funky	premiered March 31, 2002	
Gargoyles	Gárgolas: Héroes Góticos		
Godzilla: The Series	Godzilla La Serie	premiered February 1, 1999	
Goosebumps	Escalofríos	premiered November 24, 1996	
Groundling Marsh	Los Fanguitos	premiered November 20, 1996	
The Hallo Spencer Show	Hola Spencer	premiered November 20, 1996	
The Hardy Boys	Los Hardy Boys	premiered November 24, 1996	
Heavy Gear: The Animated Series	Heavy Gear	premiered December 22, 2001	
The Incredible Hulk (1966)	El increíble Hulk (1966)	premiered January 1, 2000	(Note: As part of Midnight Classics (Clásicos de la Medianoche) block.)
The Incredible Hulk (1996)	El increíble Hulk (1996)		
Inspector Gadget	El Inspector Truquini/El Inspector Gadget		
Iron Man (1966)	El Hombre de Hierro (1966)	premiered January 1, 2000	
Iron Man (1994)	El Hombre de Hierro (1994)	premiered November 24, 1996	
Iznogoud	El gran visir/Iznogoud el Califa	premiered November 20, 1996	
Jason and the Heroes of Mount Olympus	Jason y Los Héroes del Monte Olimpo		
Jim Button	Jim Botón	premiered February 1, 1999	
Jim Henson's Dog City	Dog City		
Jin Jin and the Panda Patrol	Jin Jin y la Patrulla Panda	premiered November 23, 1996	
The Jungle Book	El Libro de La Selva	premiered June 10, 1997	
Kamen Rider Black			
The Kids from Room 402	Travesuras en el Aula 402	premiered December 1, 2000	
Kimba the White Lion	Kimba el león blanco	premiered November 20, 1996	
Kirby: Right Back at Ya!	Kirby	premiered July 7, 2003; Tooned Out (Caricaturizados) unaired	
Kong: The Animated Series	KONK		
Laurel and Hardy	El Gordo y El Flaco		
Lenore: The Cute Little Dead Girl	Lenore, la dulce niña muerta		
Let's Go Quintuplets!	Problemas quíntuples		
Life with Louie	La Vida con Louie/Viviendo con Louie	premiered November 23, 1996	
Little Mouse on the Prairie	El Ratoncito de la pradera	premiered November 20, 1996	
Little Wizards	Los pequeños magos	premiered November 23, 1996	
Living with Lionel	Viviendo con Lionel		
Los Luchadores			
Mad Jack the Pirate	Mad Jack el pirata	premiered October 3, 1999	
Mad Scientist Toon Club	El Club del Científico Loco	premiered January 9, 1997	
Madison		premiered November 20, 1996	
The Magician	El Mago	premiered February 1, 1999	
Mary-Kate and Ashley in Action!	Mary-Kate y Ashley en Acción		
Masked Rider		premiered November 24, 1996	
Medabots		premiered November 19, 2001	
Mega Babies	Los Megabebés	premiered December 1, 2000	
MegaMan NT Warrior			
Mighty Max	Max El Poderoso	premiered November 23, 1996	
Mighty Morphin Alien Rangers			
Mighty Morphin Power Rangers	Power Rangers	premiered November 20, 1996	
The Mighty Thor	La poderosa Thor/El poderoso Thor	premiered January 1, 2000	
Mission Outer Space Srungle	Fuerza Especial Gorila		
Moesha		season 1 only	
Mon Colle Knights	Los Caballeros del mundo Mon	premiered August 7, 2000	
Monster Farm	La Granja de los Monstruos		
Monster Rancher	Los Monstruos Cibernéticos	premiered January 1, 2000	
Mort & Phil	Mortadelo y Filemón		
Mortal Kombat: Defenders of the Realm	Mortal Kombat los defensores del Reino	premiered November 20, 1998	
The Mouse and the Monster	La Pareja Dispareja	premiered November 20, 1998	
Moville Mysteries	Los Misterios de Moville	premiered March 1, 2003	
Mowgli: The New Adventures of the Jungle Book	Mowgli: Las Nuevas Aventuras		
The Mummy	La Momia: la serie animada	premiered March 31, 2002	
The Munsters	La Familia Monster		
My Parents Are Aliens	Mis Padres son Extraterrestres	seasons 1 & 2 only	
Mystic Knights of Tir Na Nog	Los Caballeros Místicos de Tir Na Nog	premiered February 2, 1999	
Nancy Drew		premiered November 24, 1996	
NASCAR Racers		premiered April 4, 2000	
The New Addams Family	Los Nuevos Locos Addams	premiered March 27, 2000	
The New Woody Woodpecker Show	El Nuevo Show del Pájaro Loco	premiered May 1, 1999	
Ninja Senshi Tobikage			
Ninja Turtles: The Next Mutation	Las Tortugas Ninja la Siguiente Mutación	premiered January 1, 1998	
Noozles	Sandy Y Sus Koalas	premiered November 23, 1996	
Ocean Girl	La Chica del Océano	premiered November 20, 1996	
Oggy and the Cockroaches	Oggy y las cucarachas	premiered November 20, 1998	
Patlabor the Mobile Police	Patlabor: Policía Especial		
Peter Pan & the Pirates	Peter Pan y los Piratas	premiered November 11, 1997	
Piggsburg Pigs!	Aventuras en Puercolandia		
Pigs Next Door	Los Cerditos De Al Lado	premiered December 1, 2000	
Pinocchio: The Series	Pinocho	premiered November 20, 1996	
Power Rangers in Space	Power Rangers En el Espacio	premiered March 1, 1999	
Power Rangers Lightspeed Rescue	Power Rangers a la Velocidad de la Luz		
Power Rangers Lost Galaxy	Power Rangers La Galaxia Perdida	premiered March 13, 2000	
Power Rangers Ninja Storm	Power Rangers Tormenta Ninja		
Power Rangers Time Force	Power Rangers Fuerza del Tiempo		
Power Rangers Turbo		premiered March 2, 1998	
Power Rangers Wild Force	Power Rangers Fuerza Salvaje		
Power Rangers Zeo		premiered July 7, 1997	
Princess Sissi	Sissi La Princesa	premiered September 9, 1998	
Pocket Dragon Adventures	Las aventuras de los dragoncitos		
The Raccoons	Los Mapaches		
Ready or Not	Tiempos inolvidables		
Return to the Planet of the Apes	El regreso al planeta de los simios		
Riding High	Lindentree, Escuela de Equitación	premiered November 20, 1996	
The Ripping Friends	Los amigos musculosos		
Robinson Sucroe		premiered March 27, 2000	
RoboCop			
RoboCop: Alpha Commando	Robocop Comando Alpha		
RoboRoach			
Rude Dog and the Dweebs	Rudo y su Pandilla		
Saban's Adventures of the Little Mermaid	Las Aventuras de la Pequeña Sirenita por Saban	premiered June 10, 1997	
Saban's Adventures of Oliver Twist	Las Aventuras de Oliver Twist	premiered November 11, 1997	
Saban's My Favorite Fairy Tales	Los Cuentos Clásicos		
Saban's Willow Town	El Pueblo de los Sauces	premiered November 20, 1998	
Samurai Pizza Cats	Los Gatos Samurai	premiered November 20, 1996	
Scary But True	Historias de Miedo		
The Secret Files of the Spy Dogs	Los Archivos Secretos de los Perros Espías	premiered November 20, 1998	
The Secret World of Alex Mack	El Mundo Secreto de Alex Mack	premiered November 24, 1996	
Shin-chan			
Shaman King		premiered October 7, 2002	
Sherlock Holmes in the 22nd Century	Sherlock Holmes del Siglo XXII		
Shinzo			
Silver Surfer		premiered January 1, 1998	
Sister, Sister	Hermana, Hermana	season 1 only	
So Little Time	Gemelas en Apuros	premiered June 20, 2001	
So Weird	Que Raro	premiered May 7, 2004	
Sonic X			
Space Goofs	Casa de Mutantes	premiered November 23, 1996	
Space Strikers		premiered November 24, 1996	
Spider-Man	El Hombre Araña (1967)	premiered January 1, 2000	
Spider-Man: The Animated Series	El Hombre Araña (1994)	premiered November 23, 1996	
Spider-Man and His Amazing Friends	El hombre sorprendente araña y sus increíbles amigos	premiered January 1, 2000	
Spider-Man Unlimited	El Hombre Araña Sin Límites	premiered March 20, 2000	
Spider-Woman	La Mujer Araña	premiered January 1, 2000	
The Spooktacular New Adventures of Casper	Gasparin	premiered November 23, 1996	
Star Wars: Droids: The Adventures of R2-D2 and C-3PO	Droids		
Star Wars: Ewoks	EWOKS		
State of Grace	Hannah y Grace	premiered June 20, 2001	
Super Duper Sumos	Super Sumos		
The Super Mario Bros. Super Show!	El show de Super Mario Bros.		
Super Pig	Supercerdita	premiered January 1, 2000	
Sweet Valley High	Mellizas y Rivales	premiered November 20, 1996	
Tales from the Cryptkeeper	Cuentos de la Cripta	premiered November 23, 1996	
Tales from the Neverending Story	La Historia Sin Fin		
Teenage Mutant Ninja Turtles (1987)	Las Tortugas Ninja (1987)		
Teenage Mutant Ninja Turtles (2003)	Las Tortugas Ninja (2003)	premiered October 11, 2003	
The Three Stooges	Los Tres Chiflados		
The Tick	La Garrapata	premiered November 23, 1996	
Tom and Vicky	Tom y Vicky		
Toonsylvania		premiered November 20, 1998	
Totally Spies!	3 Espías Sin Límite	seasons 1 & 2 only; premiered March 25, 2002	
Track City	La Autopista		
Transformers: Armada		premiered June 7, 2003	
Transformers: Cybertron			
Transformers: Robots in Disguise			
Ultimate Muscle	Kid Músculo	premiered July 7, 2003	
Ultraman Tiga			
The Underdog Show	El Show del Superperrito/El Show de Underdog/El Supercan	premiered November 20, 1996	
VIP Club	Club VIP	with Your Hosts: José, Michel and Sebastián	
VR Troopers		premiered November 20, 1996	
Vytor: The Starfire Champion	Vytor, Defensor del Anillo de Fuego		
Walter Melon	Walter Melon: El Héroe Suplente	premiered November 20, 1998	
Weird-Ohs	Locos de Remate		
What's with Andy?	Las Locuras de Andy		
What About Mimi?	Que Tal Mimi		
Wheel Squad	Wheel Squad Escuadrón Sobre Ruedas		
Where on Earth Is Carmen Sandiego?	En dónde está en el mundo Carmen San Diego		
The Why Why Family	La Familia Por Qué	premiered January 9, 1997	
Wicked Science	Ciencia Traviesa	premiered July 30, 2004	
Wild C.A.T.s	WildC.A.T.S.		
Wishbone		premiered November 20, 1996	
The Woody Woodpecker Show	El Pájaro Loco	premiered January 1, 2000	
Wowser			
Wunschpunsch		premiered October 2, 2000	
X-DuckX	Dos Patos Extremos		
X-Men: The Animated Series	Hombres x	premiered November 20, 1996	
Xyber 9: New Dawn	Xyber 9	premiered September 4, 2000	
Young Hercules	El Jóven Hércules	premiered November 20, 1998	
Zorro	El Zorro		
ZZZap!	Zzzap!		

=== Shorts/Interstitials ===
Title	Spanish title	Note(s)	Source(s)
And Now A Message from the: VR Troopers	Y Ahora Un Mensaje de los: VR Troopers		
Battalion (Vs. Between Characters and Series from the Channel 2004)	Batallón (Vs. entre personajes y series del canal 2004)		
Daniel			
Eastern Proverb	Proverbio Oriental		
Faint Lights of the Fox Kids Cup	Tenues Luminarias de la Copa Fox Kids		
Fan Duel	Duelo de Fanáticos	2003	
FOX KIDS Characters, Trips, and Video Games	FOX KIDS Personajes, Viajes, y Videojuegos	1998	
Fox Kids Cup Presents: Electronic Dictionary	Copa Fox Kids presenta: Diccionario Electrónico		
Fox Kids Cup Presents: Golden Ball	Copa Fox Kids presenta: Balón de Oro		
Fox Kids Cup Presents: National Star	Copa Fox Kids Presenta: Estrella Nacional	2003	
Fox Kids HOLLYWOOD		1999	
FOX KIDS Movies, Stars, and TV	FOX KIDS Cine, Estrellas, y Tv	1998	
Fox Kids Network Shorts	Cortos Fox Kids Network	1995-1997	
Fox Kids Trivia	Trivias Fox Kids	1998-2004	
Fox Kids VIDEO CAM			
Great Moments in Sports	Grandes momentos del Deporte		
Jack & Marcel		2000-2001	
Jellabies			
Kabah: Group and Members	Kabah: grupo e integrantes	Mexico exclusive	
Lenore: The Cute Little Dead Girl	Lenore, la dulce niña muerta		
Living with Lionel	Viviendo con Lionel	2001-2003	
Los Luchadores		2001	
Mafalda		1993	
Miguel and Manuel: The Dynamite Brothers	Miguel y Manuel: Los Hermanos Dinamita		
Musical-Video	Video-Musical	1998-2000	
News Cup (2003) with Quique Wolff and JuanPi Tártara	Copa Noticias (2003) con Quique Wolff y JuanPi Tártara		
Now a Message from the: Power Rangers	Ahora Un Mensaje de los: Power Rangers		
Oswald			
Plasmo		Brazil exclusive	
The Play of the Week from the 2000 Fox Kids Cup	La Jugada De La Semana de la Copa Fox Kids 2000		
Pucca Funny Love		2004	
Question Cup	Copa Preguntas	2002-2003	
Secrets of Football with Professor Quique Wolff	Secretos del Fútbol con el profesor Quique Wolff		
Soccer with Juan Carlos	Fútbol con Juan Carlos		
Steve Lombardo			
Trash Valley	Valle Basura		
The Wardrobe Stylist	La Vestuarista		
X Cam			

=== Movies/Specials ===
Title	Spanish title	Note(s)	Source(s)
3 Ninjas			
Addams Family Reunion	La Reunión de Los Locos Addams		
The Amazing Zorro	El increíble Zorro		
Antz	Hormiguitaz	premiered January 7, 2002	
The Archies in Jugman	Archie En El Primo Sapiens		
Au Pair	Niñera por accidente		
Au Pair II: The Fairytale Continues	Niñera por accidente: La historia continúa		
Baby Geniuses	Pequeños genios		
The Backstreet Boys' Homecoming: Live In Orlando	Los Backstreet Boys en Concierto desde Orlando		
Batman			
Bubsy		TV pilot	
Casper	Gasparin la película		
Casper: A Spirited Beginning	Casper: La Primera Aventura	premiered January 8, 2002	
Casper Meets Wendy	Casper y la mágica Wendy	premiered January 14, 2002	
Chicken Run	Pollitos en fuga		
A Christmas Carol	Un cuento de Navidad		
Christmas Carol: The Movie	Un cuento de Navidad, la película		
The Christmas Story Keepers	Navidad con los guardianes de la historia	premiered December 24, 2001	
Cyber Team in Akihabara: The Movie	Cyber Team en Akihabara: Vacaciones de verano del 2011	premiered January 9, 2002	
Dennis the Menace	Daniel el Travieso		
Digimon: The Movie	Digimon La Película		
Dinosaur Island	La isla de los dinosaurios		
Faeries	Las hadas	premiered January 25, 2002	
The Fairly OddParents: Abra-Catastrophe!	Los padrinos mágicos: ¡Abra catástrofe!		
Fox Kids 2000		premiered December 1, 1999	
Gahan Wilson's The Kid	El Niño de Gahan Wilson	premiered January 10, 2002	
Galaxy Quest	Héroes fuera de órbita		
Gargoyles the Movie: The Heroes Awaken	Gárgolas, el despertar		
Groove Squad	Groove Squad: Super escuadrón, la película		
Jojo		premiered December 24, 2001	
Joseph: King of Dreams	José, el rey de los		
Jumanji			
The Lion King	El rey león		
Mighty Morphin Power Rangers: The Movie	Power Rangers: La película		
Mouse Hunt	Un Ratoncito Duro de Caza		
Nine Dog Christmas	Ladridos en Navidad		
Oh, Baby	Bebés traviesos		
Patlabor: The Movie	Patlabor: La película	premiered January 22, 2002	
Patlabor 2: The Movie	Patlabor 2: La película	premiered January 23, 2002	
Paulie		premiered January 15, 2002	
Power Rangers: Green with Evil	Power Rangers: Un nuevo Ranger malvado	premiered January 11, 2002	
Power Rangers: Journey's End			
Power Rangers: The Mutiny	Power Rangers: El motín	premiered January 18, 2002	
Power Rangers: Return of the Green Ranger	Power Rangers: El regreso del Green Ranger	premiered January 21, 2002	
Power Rangers: Shift Into Turbo	Power Rangers: Cambio a Turbo	premiered January 16, 2002	
The Prince of Egypt	El príncipe de Egipto	premiered January 24, 2002	
Richie Rich's Christmas Wish	La Navidad de Ricky Ricón		
The Road to El Dorado	El camino hacia El Dorado		
Robbie the Reindeer in the Great Race	Robbie el venado en la gran carrera	premiered December 24, 2001	
Robbie the Reindeer: Hooves of Fire	Robbie, a Rena: Cascos de Fogo		
Rusty: A Dog's Tale	Rusty: El Rescate Fantastico		
Samson & Sally	Sampson y Sally		
The Scarlet Flower	La Flor Escarlata		
Second Chance/Boys Will Be Boys	Segunda Oportunidad	premiered November 23, 1996	
Shrek			
Small Soldiers	Pequeños guerreros		
The Snow Queen	La Reina de las Nieves		
Spice Girls Extravaganza: Spice Girls in London		premiered December 6, 1998	
Super Kid	슈퍼차일드		
Time Kid: The Time Machine	El chico del tiempo		
Time Share	Tiempo compartido		
The Transformers: The Movie	Los Transformers: La película		
Turbo: A Power Rangers Movie	Turbo: Una película de los Power Rangers		
Vytor: The Starfire Champion	Vytor, Defensor del Anillo de Fuego	All 4 episodes combined into a movie	
Wallace & Gromit: A Close Shave	Wallace & Gromit: Una afeitada al ras		
Wallace & Gromit: A Grand Day Out	Wallace y Gromit: Un día de campo en la luna		
Wallace & Gromit: The Wrong Trousers	Wallace y Gromit: Los pantalones equivocados		
The Wind in the Willows	El Viento en los Sauces		
Wishbone's Dog Days of the West	Los perros días del oeste de Wishbone	premiered January 17, 2002	
The World of Peter Rabbit and Friends	Pedro Conejo y sus Amigos		

=== Blocks ===
Title	Spanish title	Note(s)	Source(s)
Anime Invasion		premiered March 1, 2001	
Cineskopio			
Girl Power			
Insomnia	Insomnio	premiered June 11, 2001	
It's Itsy Bitsy Time!		formerly Mini Fox Blox	
Midnight Classics	Clásicos de la Medianoche		
Mysteria		premiered March 3, 2001	
Super-Crazy	Super-Chiflados		
Who's in Control?	¿Quién tiene el control?	premiered October 12, 2002	

=== Scrapped ===
Title	Spanish title	Note(s)	Source(s)
One Piece			
Yu-Gi-Oh! Duel Monsters			

== Netherlands ==
- Action Man (1995)
- Action Man (2000)
- The Adventures of Hutch the Honeybee
- Angela Anaconda
- Auntie Susa & Sassafras (Tante Soesa & Sassefras) (short series)
- The Avengers: United They Stand
- Bamboo Bears
- Beyblade
- Big Wolf on Campus
- Biker Mice from Mars
- Bit the Cupid
- Bob in a Bottle
- Bob the Builder (Bob, de Bouwer) (later on the Play block)
- Bobby's World
- Bobo (later on the Play block)
- Braceface
- Care Bears
- The Club of Sinterklaas
- C.O.P.S.
- Dennis the Menace
- Digimon
- Dinozaurs
- Dungeons & Dragons
- Eek! The Cat
- Ernst, Bobbie and the Others
- Flint the Time Detective
- Fox Kids Control
- Fox Kids TV Team
- Franklin (later on the Play block)
- Funky Cops
- The Hallo Spencer Show
- Hamtaro (later on the Play block)
- Hello Kitty's Paradise
- Huckleberry Finn
- Inspector Gadget
- It's Your Call
- Iznogoud
- Jacob Two-Two
- Jim Button
- Journey to the Heart of the World
- Jungle Tales
- The Kids from Room 402
- King Arthur and the Knights of Justice
- The Koala Brothers
- Lazer Patrol
- The Littl' Bits
- Life with Louie
- Lizzie McGuire
- Martin Mystery
- Masked Rider
- Medabots
- Mon Colle Knights
- Monster Farm
- The Mouse and the Monster
- M.A.S.K.
- Pecola
- Peter Pan & the Pirates
- Pokémon
- Pokémon Update (short series)
- Power Rangers Lightspeed Rescue
- Power Rangers Lost Galaxy
- Power Rangers Zeo
- Power Rock
- Princess Sissi
- RoboRoach
- Saban's Adventures of the Little Mermaid
- Saban's Adventures of Oliver Twist
- The Secret Files of the Spy Dogs
- Shin-chan
- Shinzo
- Spider-Man
- Spider-Man Unlimited
- Starla & the Jewel Riders
- Super Pig
- Symfollies
- Teenage Mutant Ninja Turtles
- The Tick
- Totally Spies!
- The Triplets
- Tractor Tom (later on the Play block)
- Tuttels (later on the Play block)
- The Twins of Destiny
- VR Troopers
- Wacky Wake-Up
- Walter Melon
- The Why Why Family
- Wunschpunsch
- X-Men
- The Zack Files

== Poland ==
- The Adventures of Hutch the Honeybee
- Attack of the Killer Tomatoes
- Beyblade
- Beetleborgs Metallix
- Biker Mice from Mars
- Bob the Builder
- Bobby's World
- Breaker High
- Bureau of Alien Detectors
- Button Nose
- Dennis the Menace
- Digimon
- Diplodos
- Eagle Riders
- Eek! The Cat
- Eerie, Indiana
- Fantastic Four
- The Get Along Gang
- Goosebumps
- Heathcliff
- Huckleberry Finn
- The Incredible Hulk
- Inspector Gadget
- Iron Man
- Jin Jin and the Panda Patrol
- Life with Louie
- The Littl' Bits
- Little Mouse on the Prairie
- The Littles
- M.A.S.K.
- Mad Jack the Pirate
- Mad Scientist Toon Club
- Masked Rider
- Mighty Morphin Power Rangers
- Monster Farm
- The Mouse and the Monster
- Mystic Knights of Tir Na Nog
- The New Addams Family
- Peter Pan & the Pirates
- Pinocchio: The Series
- Pokémon
- Pole Position
- Princess Sissi
- Saban's Adventures of Oliver Twist
- The Secret Files of the Spy Dogs
- Silver Surfer
- The Simpsons (late 1999-2003)
- Spider-Man
- Starcom: The U.S. Space Force
- Sylvanian Families
- Teknoman
- Tenko and the Guardians of the Magic
- Three Little Ghosts
- The Three Friends and Jerry
- The Tick
- Ulysses 31
- VR Troopers
- Walter Melon
- The Why Why Family
- X-Men

=== Movies ===
- Digimon: The Movie
- Pokémon: The First Movie
- Pokémon the Movie 2000

== Russia ==
- The Adventures of Hutch the Honeybee (Пчелка Хатч)
- Bobby's World (Мир Бобби)
- Bureau of Alien Detectors (Бюро Космических Детективов)
- Button Nose (Лили в Клубничном Мире)
- Creepy Crawlers (Ползучее Войско)
- Dennis the Menace (Денис Непоседа)
- Eek! The Cat (Koт Ик)
- Eerie, Indiana (Мистический городок Эйри в Индиане)
- Fox Kids Family Album (Семейный Альбом Fox Kids)
- Inspector Gadget (Инспектор Гаджeт)
- Jin Jin and the Panda Patrol (Джин Джин из страны Пандаленд)
- Life with Louie (Жизнь c Луи)
- Peter Pan & the Pirates (Питер Пэн)
- Pinocchio: The Series (Пиноккио)
- Saban's Adventures of the Little Mermaid (Русалочка (Производства компании Сабан))
- Spider-Man (Спайдермэн)
- The Tick (Тик-герой)
- The Why Why Family (Семья Пoчeмy)
- X-Men (Икс-мэн)

== Scandinavia ==
- Be Alert Bert
- Bobby's World
- Braceface
- Breaker High
- Button Nose
- Camp Candy
- Dennis the Menace
- Digimon
- Eek! The Cat
- Eerie, Indiana
- Franklin
- Goosebumps
- Hamtaro
- Heathcliff
- Huckleberry Finn
- Inspector Gadget
- Iznogoud
- Jacob Two-Two
- Jungle Tales
- Life with Louie
- Lisa
- Little Shop
- Mad Jack the Pirate
- The Magic School Bus
- The Mouse and the Monster
- The New Archies
- Oggy and the Cockroaches
- Pecola
- Peter Pan & the Pirates
- Pokémon
- Princess Sissi
- The Puzzle Place
- Saban's Adventures of the Little Mermaid
- Saban's Adventures of Oliver Twist
- Saban's Gulliver's Travels
- The Shelly T. Turtle Show
- Spider-Man
- The Secret Files of the Spy Dogs
- The Super Mario Bros. Super Show!
- Sweet Valley High
- The Three Friends and Jerry
- Three Little Ghosts
- Totally Spies!
- Walter Melon
- The Why Why Family

== Spain ==
- Bob & Friends
- Digimon
- Dilbert
- Flint the Time Detective
- Hamtaro
- Mighty Morphin Alien Rangers
- Mighty Morphin Power Rangers
- Mimi and Mr. Bobo (premiered June 1, 2003)
- Mort & Phil
- Pokémon
- Power Rangers Dino Thunder
- Power Rangers in Space
- Power Rangers Lightspeed Rescue
- Power Rangers Ninja Storm
- Power Rangers Lost Galaxy
- Power Rangers Time Force
- Power Rangers Turbo
- Power Rangers Wild Force
- Power Rangers Zeo
- The Three Friends and Jerry
- The Three Stooges
- The Triplets
- X-Men: The Animated Series

=== Blocks ===
- Girls' Zone (Zona Chicas)
- Planet Pokémon (Planeta Pokémon)

== United States ==
For list of programs airing on Fox, see List of programs broadcast by Fox Kids (block).

== See also ==
- List of programs broadcast by Jetix
- Fox Family Channel
- Fox Kids
- Jetix
- 4Kids TV
