= List of programmes broadcast by Disney XD (United Kingdom and Ireland) =

This is a list of programmes shown on Disney XD in the UK and Ireland. It does not include those shown only on Disney Channel, Disney Junior and previously Disney Cinemagic and Toon Disney.

== Final programming ==
=== Acquired from Disney XD (U.S.) ===
- Big City Greens (18 June 2018 – closure)
- DuckTales (4 November 2017 – closure)

==== Reruns ====
- Gravity Falls (September 7, 2012 – closure)
- Lab Rats (April 19, 2012 – closure)
- Mickey Mouse
- Phineas and Ferb (September 2009 – closure)
- Right Now Kapow (2016 - 2017; 2020)

=== Other acquired series ===
- Counterfeit Cat (2016 - closure) (now on S4C and CBBC)
- Dude, That's My Ghost! (2 February 2013 – closure)
- Furiki Wheels (2018-closure)
- Space Chickens in Space (2018-closure)

== Former programming ==
=== Disney XD ===
- The 7D
- Aaron Stone
- American Dragon: Jake Long
- Amphibia (August 5, 2019 – 2020)
- Angry Birds Stella
- Atomic Puppet
- Big Hero 6: The Series (30 November 2017 – 2020)
- Billy Dilley's Super-Duper Subterranean Summer
- Boyster (2014–2020)
- Camp Lakebottom
- Cars Toons
- Captain Flamingo
- Crash & Bernstein
- The Cube (4 March 2013 – 2020)
- Disney 11 (June 5, 2018 – 2020)
- Fish Hooks
- Fort Boyard: Ultimate Challenge
- Gamer's Guide to Pretty Much Everything (2015-2017)
- Guardians of the Galaxy
- Hulk and the Agents of S.M.A.S.H. (2013-2018)
- I'm in the Band
- Inazuma Eleven
- Japanizi: Going, Going, Gong!
- K.C. Undercover
- Kick Buttowski: Suburban Daredevil (2010–2014; reran in 2019)
- Kickin' It
- Kid vs. Kat (2009–2018)
- Lab Rats: Elite Force
- Lego Star Wars: All-Stars
- Lego Star Wars: The Freemaker Adventures
- Marvel's Avengers Assemble (2014-2019)
- Marvel's Spider-Man (July 2017 – closure)
- Mech-X4
- Mega Awesome Super Hacks
- Mighty Med (5 April 2014 - 2016; February 2019 - 2020)
- Milo Murphy's Law (September 18, 2017 – 2020)
- Motorcity
- My Babysitter's A Vampire
- Pac-Man and the Ghostly Adventures
- Packages from Planet X
- Pair of Kings
- Penn Zero: Part-Time Hero
- Pickle and Peanut (2015-2017)
- Pokémon
- Randy Cunningham: 9th Grade Ninja (October 4, 2012 – 2020)
- Rated A for Awesome (2011 - 2018)
- Shreducation
- Supa Strikas (now on Sky Kids)
- Star vs. the Forces of Evil (April 16, 2015 – 2020)
- Star Wars Rebels (2014–2018)
- Star Wars Resistance (2018-2020)
- Stoked
- Thunderbirds Are Go
- Ultimate Spider-Man
- Walk the Prank
- Wander Over Yonder (2014–2017)
- Yu-Gi-Oh! 5D's
- Zeke and Luther

=== Jetix ===
- A.T.O.M.
- Bobobo-bo Bo-bobo
- Chaotic
- Combo Niños
- Di-Gata Defenders
- Dinosaur King
- Dork Hunters from Outer Space
- Funky Cops
- Galactik Football
- Get Ed
- Grossology
- Huntik: Secrets & Seekers
- Iggy Arbuckle
- Iron Kid
- Iron Man: Armoured Adventures
- Jimmy Two-Shoes
- Lockie Leonard
- Magi-Nation
- Monster Buster Club (2008-2009)
- Monster Warriors
- Naruto
- Ōban Star-Racers
- The Owl
- Pokémon: Diamond and Pearl: Battle Dimension
- PXG
- Super Robot Monkey Team Hyperforce Go! (2005–2006)
- Team Galaxy
- Teenage Mutant Ninja Turtles
- Total Drama Island
- Urban Vermin
- Viewtiful Joe
- W.I.T.C.H.
- Yin Yang Yo!

=== Fox Kids ===
- Ace Ventura: Pet Detective
- Action Man
- The Avengers: United They Stand
- Bad Dog
- Beast Wars
- Big Bad Beetleborgs
- Big Wolf on Campus
- Biker Mice from Mars (1993)
- Billy the Cat
- Black Hole High
- Braceface
- The Breakfast Bash With Larry & Lee
- Breaker High
- Bumpety Boo
- Button Nose
- C Bear and Jamal (also on CBBC)
- Camp Candy
- Dark Oracle
- Delfy and His Friends
- Dennis the Menace
- Dennis
- Diabolik: Track of the Panther
- Digimon: Digital Monsters
- Diplodos
- Donkey Kong Country
- Dragon Flyz
- Eagle Riders
- Eek! The Cat
- Eerie, Indiana
- Fantastic Four
- The Foxbusters
- Flint the Time Detective
- G.I. Joe: A Real American Hero
- Gadget & the Gadgetinis
- Gogs
- Goosebumps
- Grimm's Fairy Tale Classics
- Gulliver's Travels
- Hamtaro
- Heathcliff
- Heavy Gear: The Animated Series
- Hello Kitty's Paradise
- He-Man and the Masters of the Universe
- Honeybee Hutch
- The Hot Rod Dogs and Cool Car Cats
- Huckleberry Finn
- Incredible Hulk
- Inspector Gadget
- Iron Man
- Iznogoud
- Jackie Chan Adventures
- Jacob Two-Two
- Jayce and the Wheeled Warriors
- Jellabies
- Jin Jin and the Panda Patrol
- The Kids from Room 402
- Life with Louie
- Living with Lionel
- Lucky Luke
- M.A.S.K.
- MacDonald's Farm
- Mad Jack the Pirate
- Martin Mystery
- The Marvel Action Hour
- Masked Rider
- Medabots
- MegaMan: NT Warrior (As part of Jetix block)
- Mon Colle Knights
- Monster Farm
- Mortal Kombat: Defenders of the Realm
- Moville Mysteries
- Mystic Knights of Tir Na Nog
- Nanalan'
- NASCAR Racers
- The New Addams Family
- The New Woody Woodpecker Show (2000–2005)
- Ninja Turtles: The Next Mutation
- Pat & Mat
- Pecola
- Peter Pan
- Pig City
- Pinocchio: The Series
- Power Rangers
  - Power Rangers Wild Force
- Princess Sissi
- Rayearth
- The Real Ghostbusters
- Rimba's Island
- RoboCop
- RoboRoach
- Robot Wars (Series 7 Only)
- Saban's Adventures of the Little Mermaid
- Saban's Adventures of Oliver Twist
- Saber Rider and the Star Sheriffs
- Sailor Moon
- Samurai Pizza Cats
- The Secret Files of the Spy Dogs
- Shaman King
- Shin Chan
- Shinzo
- The Silver Surfer
- So Little Time
- Sonic X
- Spider-Man
- Spider-Man Unlimited
- Spider Woman
- The Spooktacular New Adventures of Casper
- Superhuman Samurai Syber-Squad
- The Super Mario Bros. Super Show!
- Super Pig
- Sweet Valley High
- Teenage Mutant Ninja Turtles
- Teknoman
- Three Little Ghosts
- The Tick
- Totally Spies!
- Tracey McBean
- Transformers: Robots in Disguise
- The Triplets
- Ulysses 31 (also on CBBC)
- VR Troopers
- Walter Melon
- What's with Andy?
- The Why Why Family
- The World of Tosh
- Wunschpunsch
- X-Men: The Animated Series
- The Zack Files

== See also ==
- The Walt Disney Company
- Jetix
- Fox Kids
