= Jamie Simone =

American voice director and producer

- Occupations: Voice director, producer, casting director
- Years active: 1989–present

Jamie Simone is an American voice director and producer, best known for directing Naruto, Sailor Moon and Tiger & Bunny. He is the owner of the recording studio Studiopolis. In 2012, he was nominated for a Daytime Emmy Award for "Outstanding Directing in an Animated Program" for Transformers: Prime, which he took over from Susan Blu.

== Filmography ==
=== Anime ===
- Bleach: Thousand-Year Blood War – Johann Seydlitz
- Jujutsu Kaisen – Ogi Zen'in, Furudate
- Naruto – Akamaru
- Naruto: Shippuden – Akamaru

=== Film ===
- Bleach: Hell Verse – Garogai
- Dino Time – Additional Voices
- Naruto the Movie: Ninja Clash in the Land of Snow – Additional Voices
- Naruto Shippuden the Movie: The Will of Fire – Izumo Kamizuki
- Sky Blue – Dispatcher

=== Video games ===
- Naruto: Clash of Ninja 2 – Akamaru
- Naruto: Path of a Ninja 2 – Akamaru
- Naruto: Ultimate Ninja – Waraji
- Naruto: Uzumaki Chronicles – Akamaru

== Voice director ==
- 24: The Game
- Afro Samurai
- Afro Samurai: Resurrection
- Avengers Confidential: Black Widow & Punisher
- The Avengers: Earth's Mightiest Heroes
- Brave: The Search for Spirit Dancer
- Bratz: Starrin' and Stylin'
- Casper: A Spirited Beginning
- Creepy Crawlers
- DC Nation Shorts
- Digimon Data Squad
- Doctor Strange: The Sorcerer Supreme
- Gormiti: The Lords of Nature Return!
- Happiness Is a Warm Blanket, Charlie Brown
- Hulk and the Agents of S.M.A.S.H.
- Hulk Versus
- Initial D
- The Invincible Iron Man
- Kangaroo Jack: G'Day U.S.A.!
- Kaze no Yojimbo
- Lego Marvel Super Heroes
- Loonatics Unleashed
- Marvel Future Avengers
- Marvel Heroes
- Marvel Super Hero Squad
- My Little Pony: The Movie
- Naruto
- Naruto: Shippuden
- Next Avengers: Heroes of Tomorrow
- NFL Rush Zone: Season of the Guardians
- Planet Hulk
- Resonance of Fate
- Saban's Adventures of Oliver Twist
- Sailor Moon
- The Secret Files of the Spy Dogs
- Sonic Free Riders
- Space Chimps 2: Zartog Strikes Back
- Spider-Man Unlimited
- Spider-Man Unlimited (video game)
- Stitch!
- The Orbital Children
- The Super Hero Squad Show
- The Tale of Princess Kaguya
- Tenkai Knights
- Tenko and the Guardians of the Magic
- Thor: Tales of Asgard
- Tiger & Bunny
- Totally Spies! - (seasons 1-2)
- Transformers: Prime (ep. 12-65)
- Transformers: Robots in Disguise
- Ultimate Avengers
- Ultimate Avengers 2: Rise of the Panther
- Walter Melon
- When Marnie Was There
- The Why Why Family
- Wolverine and the X-Men
- Z-Squad
