= List of programs broadcast by Fox Kids (block) =

This is a list of all programming that aired on the Fox Kids U.S. children's television block on Fox.

== Former programming ==
=== Original programming ===
==== Animated ====
Title	Premiere date	End date	Source(s)
Attack of the Killer Tomatoes	September 8, 1990	October 26, 1996	
Bobby's World	September 8, 1990	February 23, 1998	
Peter Pan and the Pirates	September 8, 1990	March 28, 1997	
Zazoo U	September 8, 1990	January 19, 1991	
Piggsburg Pigs!	September 15, 1990	August 31, 1991	
Little Shop	September 7, 1991	September 5, 1992	
Eek! The Cat	September 11, 1992	September 5, 1997	
X-Men: The Animated Series	October 31, 1992	September 20, 1997	
The Terrible Thunderlizards	November 20, 1993	1998	
Red Planet	May 14, 1994	May 18, 1996	
The Tick	September 10, 1994	December 25, 1997	
The Fox Cubhouse	October 3, 1994	April 19, 1996	
Jim Henson's Animal Show	October 3, 1994	May 17, 1996	
Johnson and Friends	October 4, 1994	April 19, 1996	
Rimba's Island	October 5, 1994	August 9, 1996	
Spider-Man: The Animated Series	November 19, 1994	January 31, 1998	
Life with Louie	December 18, 1994	December 24, 2001	
Klutter!	September 9, 1995	1996	
Magic Adventures of Mumfie	1995	January 3, 1997	
Budgie the Little Helicopter	1995	August 30, 1996	
Silver Surfer	February 7, 1998	May 29, 1998	
Walter Melon	August 8, 1998		
Mad Jack the Pirate	September 12, 1998	May 1, 1999	
The Mr. Potato Head Show	September 12, 1998	March 2, 1999	
The Secret Files of the Spy Dogs	September 12, 1998	August 28, 1999	
Digimon (Note: An umbrella name for Digimon Adventure, Adventure 02, Tamers, and Frontier. Frontier would only be shown on non-US Fox Kids blocks.)	August 14, 1999	September 7, 2002	
Xyber 9: New Dawn	September 25, 1999	December 4, 1999	
Spider-Man Unlimited	October 2, 1999	April 21, 2001	
The Avengers: United They Stand	October 30, 1999	March 18, 2000	
NASCAR Racers	November 20, 1999	March 24, 2001	
Flint the Time Detective	March 25, 2000	October 6, 2000	
Action Man	May 20, 2000	December 28, 2001	
Dinozaurs	July 28, 2000	November 24, 2000	
Escaflowne	August 19, 2000	October 21, 2000	
Mon Colle Knights	July 21, 2001	September 7, 2002	
Transformers: Robots in Disguise	September 8, 2001	September 7, 2002	

==== Live-action ====
Title	Premiere date	End date	Source(s)
Power Rangers	August 28, 1993	September 7, 2002	
Masked Rider	September 16, 1995	August 17, 1996	
Big Bad Beetleborgs	September 7, 1996	July 23, 1998	
Ninja Turtles: The Next Mutation	September 12, 1997	June 19, 1998	
Mystic Knights of Tir Na Nog	September 12, 1998	August 23, 1999	
The New Addams Family	May 31, 1999	August 27, 1999	
Los Luchadores	February 3, 2001	August 25, 2001	

=== Acquired programming ===
Title	Premiere date	End date Present	Source(s)
Fun House	September 8, 1990	April 13, 1991	(Note: Fox Kids is named in the credits but did not directly produce the show.)
Tom & Jerry Kids	September 8, 1990	August 12, 1994	
Swamp Thing	October 31, 1990	August 3, 1991	
Little Dracula	September 3, 1991	October 31, 1991	
Taz-Mania	September 7, 1991	September 6, 1996	
Beetlejuice	September 9, 1991	September 10, 1993	
Muppet Babies	September 9, 1991	September 11, 1992	
Bill and Ted's Excellent Adventures	September 14, 1991	September 5, 1992	
George of the Jungle	May 16, 1992	October 17, 1992	
Batman: The Animated Series	September 5, 1992	September 5, 1997	
Super Dave: Daredevil for Hire	September 9, 1992	December 25, 1993	
Alvin and the Chipmunks	September 14, 1992	September 3, 1993	
Merrie Melodies	September 14, 1992	September 9, 1994	
Tiny Toon Adventures	September 14, 1992	September 8, 1995	
The Plucky Duck Show	September 19, 1992	November 7, 1992	
Dog City	September 26, 1992	January 28, 1995	
Mighty Mouse: The New Adventures	November 14, 1992	December 26, 1992	
Animaniacs	September 11, 1993	September 8, 1995	
Droopy, Master Detective	October 2, 1993	September 30, 1994	
Where on Earth Is Carmen Sandiego?	February 5, 1994	April 1, 1998	
Thunderbirds	July 2, 1994	September 2, 1994	
A.J.'s Time Travelers	December 3, 1994	December 31, 1994	
Sailor Moon	September 2, 1995		
Goosebumps	October 27, 1995	December 21, 1998	
C Bear and Jamal	February 3, 1996	April 3, 1998	
Siegfried & Roy: Masters of the Impossible	February 19, 1996	February 22, 1996	
The Spooktacular New Adventures of Casper	February 24, 1996	April 3, 1998	
Eerie, Indiana	January 18, 1997	May 30, 1998	
Round the Twist	July 7, 1997	August 28, 1997	
Stickin' Around	July 26, 1997	November 15, 1997	
Space Goofs	September 6, 1997	March 3, 1999	
The Adventures of Sam & Max: Freelance Police	October 4, 1997	August 8, 1998	
Mowgli: The New Adventures of the Jungle Book	February 7, 1998	March 21, 1998	
Ned's Newt	February 7, 1998	December 31, 1998	
Toonsylvania	February 7, 1998	December 21, 1998	
Godzilla: The Series	September 12, 1998	April 22, 2000	
Oggy and the Cockroaches	September 12, 1998	March 5, 1999	
Young Hercules	September 12, 1998	May 21, 1999	
Donkey Kong Country	December 19, 1998	September 11, 1999	
The Magician	February 27, 1999	September 10, 1999	
The New Woody Woodpecker Show	May 8, 1999	September 7, 2002	(Note: The third and final season of the series went unaired in the US; it instead premiered on YTV in Canada.)
Beast Wars: Transformers	September 13, 1999	August 17, 2000	
Beast Machines: Transformers	September 18, 1999	January 20, 2001	
Big Guy and Rusty the Boy Robot	September 18, 1999	September 6, 2001	
Sherlock Holmes in the 22nd Century	September 18, 1999	June 26, 2000	
Monster Rancher	October 16, 1999	March 2, 2001	
Dungeons & Dragons	April 29, 2000	October 5, 2000	
Angela Anaconda	June 24, 2000	August 12, 2000	
Cybersix	August 19, 2000	November 4, 2000	
Real Scary Stories	November 11, 2000	November 18, 2000	
The Zack Files	February 10, 2001	March 17, 2001	
Prank Attack	March 31, 2001		
Roswell Conspiracies: Aliens, Myths and Legends	April 7, 2001	May 12, 2001	
Kong: The Animated Series	May 26, 2001	August 25, 2001	
Medabots	September 1, 2001	September 7, 2002	
Moolah Beach	September 8, 2001	October 13, 2001	
Alienators: Evolution Continues	September 15, 2001	May 18, 2002	
The Ripping Friends	September 15, 2001	January 26, 2002	
Galidor: Defenders of the Outer Dimension	February 9, 2002	September 7, 2002	

=== Programming from PBS Kids ===
Title	Premiere date	End date	Source(s)
The Magic School Bus	October 5, 1998	September 3, 2001	

== Special programming ==
=== Acquired programming ===
Title	Initial broadcast date	Source(s)
Defenders of Dynatron City (pilot only)	February 22, 1992	
Defenders of Dynatron City (pilot only)	May 16, 1992	
Solarman (pilot only)	October 24, 1992	
The Incredible Crash Dummies	May 1, 1993	

=== Programming from PBS Kids ===
Title	Initial broadcast date	Source(s)
Ghostwriter (pilot only)	October 3, 1992	

== See also ==
- List of programs broadcast by Jetix
- Fox Family Channel
- Fox Kids
- Jetix
- 4Kids TV
