= Mad Scientist Toon Club =

- Also known as: Mad Scientist Kids Club
- Starring: Michael Sorich
- Country of origin: United States
- Original language: English
- No. of seasons: 1
- No. of episodes: 20

Production
- Running time: 60 min with commercials
- Production company: Saban Entertainment

Original release
- Network: Syndication
- Release: September 15, 1993 – January 25, 1994

Mad Scientist Toon Club (also known as Mad Scientist Kids Club) is an educational children's television show produced by Saban Entertainment that aired in US syndication from September 15, 1993, to January 25, 1994.

Each hour-long program mixed live action segments hosted by the scientist character "Dr. π" and pre-existing Japanese animation, including Saban's Tic Tac Toons. Dr. Pi wore a green lab coat and a backwards baseball cap, surrounded by a colorful set, and presented experiments that children could perform at home. The format of the science portions was similar to Beakman's World and Bill Nye the Science Guy; all three were produced in response to the 1990 Children's Television Act, which mandated each broadcaster to air a minimum amount of educational programming.

Tic Tac Toons was going to air on its own on Fox Family in 1998 but it never made it.

== Episodes ==
This Mad Scientist Toon Club episode list was compiled from US Copyright Office listings. The episodes that aired on the same date were given a combined entry in the registry.

No.	Title	Original release date
1	"Spies"	September 15, 1993
2	"Inventions"	September 21, 1993
3	"Electricity"	September 28, 1993
4	"Water"	October 5, 1993
5	"Home Science"	October 12, 1993
6	"Weather"	October 19, 1993
7	"Magic"	October 26, 1993
8	"Aerodynamics"	November 2, 1993
9	"More Fun"	November 10, 1993
10	"Food Fun"	November 16, 1993
11	"Light"	November 24, 1993
12	"Toys"	December 1, 1993
13	"Plants"	December 6, 1993
14	"Space"	January 3, 1994
15	"More Space"	January 3, 1994
16	"Ecology"	January 3, 1994
17	"Sound"	January 11, 1994
18	"Fun Physics"	January 11, 1994
19	"Random Science"	January 18, 1994
20	"Movies"	January 25, 1994
