= Huckleberry no Bōken =

Japanese anime television series

- Huckleberry no Bouken
- Huckleberry no Bouken on Italia 1
- Genre: Adventure
- Anime television series
- Directed by: Masakazu Higuchi; Tameo Kohanawa
- Produced by: Takaharu Bessho; Ippei Onimaru; Mikio Nakata
- Written by: Mamoru Sasaki; Yoshiaki Yoshida; Keiichi Abe et al
- Music by: Nobuyoshi Koshibe
- Studio: Group TAC
- Original network: Fuji Television
- Original run: 2 January 1976 – 25 June 1976
- Episodes: 26
- Manga
- Written by: Ikuo Miyazoe (vol. 1-2); Noboru Uesaka (vol. 3-4)
- Published by: KK Best Group
- Published: 1976
- Volumes: 4
- Anime film
- Directed by: Masakazu Higuchi; Tameo Kohanawa
- Produced by: Takaharu Bessho; Ippei Onimaru; Mikio Nakata
- Written by: Mamoru Sasaki; Yoshiaki Yoshida; Keiichi Abe et al
- Music by: Nobuyoshi Koshibe
- Studio: Group TAC
- Released: August 16, 1991
- Runtime: 86 minutes

Huckleberry no Bōken (ハックルベリィの冒険) is a Japanese anime television series based on the 1884 novel Adventures of Huckleberry Finn by Mark Twain that aired on the Fuji Television network every Friday evening from January 2, 1976, to June 25 of the same year, for a total of 26 episodes. It is the first of two Huckleberry Finn anime. A second Huck Finn television series was made in 1994, Huckleberry Finn Monogatari.

A feature-length English dub of this series was made in the early 1980s, and broadcast on cable TV in the United States.. An Italian dub was broadcast on Rete 1 in 1980.

The English-dubbed version for the episodic TV version of Huckleberry Finn was owned by Saban Entertainment in 1993. As with most of the programming library and properties of Saban Entertainment and Fox Children's Productions, the rights to this series was owned by Disney Enterprises through BVS Entertainment, who acquired the Fox Kids Worldwide franchise in Summer 2001.

Some episodes of Saban's The Adventures of Huckleberry Finn were released on Region 2 DVD by Maximum Entertainment Ltd. in the 2000s. However, there were no plans to release the English dub version of the series on Region 1 DVD.

Masako Nozawa, who played Huckleberry, later played the main character Tom in the 1980 anime adaptation of The Adventures of Tom Sawyer, also originally written by Mark Twain (broadcast on the same station's World Masterpiece Theater), and went on to star in two other works originally written by Twain. Huckleberry also appeared in the anime as Tom's friend, played by Kazuyo Aoki.

== Plot summary ==
At the end of The Adventures of Tom Sawyer, Huck is adopted by the Widow Douglas in return for saving her life. In Adventures of Huckleberry Finn, in some respects a sequel to The Adventures of Tom Sawyer, the widow attempts to "civilize" the newly rich Huck.

Huck is kidnapped by his father but manages to fake his own death and escape to Jackson's Island, where he coincidentally meets up with Jim, a slave of the Widow Douglas' sister, Miss Watson. Jim is running for freedom because he has found out that Miss Watson plans to "sell him South" for $800. Together they construct a raft and travel on the Mississippi River, Jim hoping for freedom from slavery, and Huck searching freedom from his drunk father and controlling foster parent.

== Voice cast ==
Character	Japanese	English
Huckleberry Finn	Masako Nozawa	Daniel Brochu
Jim	Yasuo Yamada	Tyrone Benskin
Anna	Mami Koyama	
Jane Watson	Miyoko Aso	Sonja Ball
Widder Douglas	Reiko Muto	Bronwen Mantel
Judge Thatcher	Koichi Kitamura	Gary Jewell
Pap Finn	Chikao Otsuka	Aron Tager
Catalina	Rihoko Yoshida	

=== Additional voices ===
- Liz Macrae
- Michael O'Reilly
- Richard M. Dumont
- Terrence Scammell
- Joanna Noyes
- A. J. Henderson
- Susan Glover
- Bruce Dinsmore
- Dean Hagopian (credited as Dean Hagoplan)
- Michael Rudder
- Rick Jones
- Aimée Castle
- Mark Camacho
- Walter Massey
- Jodie Resther

== Episode list ==
Episode	Title
1	"Homeless Huck"
2	"A Scary Father"
3	"Log Cabin in a Secluded Wood"
4	"Huck's Great Escape"
5	"Death of Father"
6	"A Sure Handshake"
7	"Thieves Are Human Too"
8	"Jim in Danger"
9	"Mission to Rescue Jim"
10	"Huck Wanders into a House"
11	"Don't Shoot Hearney!"
12	"A Gentlemen's Agreement"
13	"After the Fight"
14	"In the Mist"
15	"Huck Protects the Delivery"
16	"Illusive Mother"
17	"Boys in the Wild"
18	"Jim's Prediction"
19	"Run, Huck"
20	"$3 Fare"
21	"The King and the Count"
22	"A Grandfather from England"
23	"Mary Smiles"
24	"Jim Is Sold"
25	"Escape, Jim"
26	"Huck Arrives Back Home"

== Music ==
		Performer	Description
"Hora Huckleberry Finn"	"Hey There, Huckleberry Finn"	Horie Mitsuko and Korogi '73	Opening Theme
"Kawa no Uta"	"Song of the River"	Horie Mitsuko and Korogi '73	Ending Theme

== See also ==
- List of films featuring slavery
