= The Why Why Family =

- Les Kikekoi
- Created by: Natalie Altmann; Vincent Chalvon-Demersay
- Written by: Annabelle Perrichon; François-Emmanuel Porché
- Directed by: Bruno Bianchi
- Voices of: Sammy Lane; Heidi Lenhart; Mendi Segal; Stanley Gurd Jr.; Derek Patrick; Genghis Studebaker; Kevin Schon (uncredited); Julie Maddalena (uncredited)
- Composers: Haim Saban; Shuki Levy; (as Michel Dax)
- Countries of origin: France; United States
- Original languages: English; French
- No. of seasons: 1
- No. of episodes: 26 (130 segments)

Production
- Executive producers: Jacqueline Tordjman; Vincent Chalvon-Demersay
- Producer: Bruno Bianchi
- Production companies: Saban Entertainment; Saban International Paris

Original release
- Network: Fox Kids (international); France 3 (France); Das Erste (Germany)
- Release: 1996

The Why Why Family (French: Les Kikekoi, also known as Saban's The Why Why Family) is an animated children's television series, which originally aired from late 1996 to 1997. It was produced by Saban International Paris and Saban Entertainment. The show was broadcast internationally on Fox Kids (starting with Fox Kids Netherlands and Fox Kids UK feeds later expanded airs on other feeds), while in the United States it was syndicated as part of the company's "The Saban Network for Kids!" strand. Character designs and comedy elements emulate vintage cartoons.

== Synopsis ==
Every episode begins with Victor (off-screen) summarizing what his family members will teach him in the episode.
Each episode is divided into 5 segments. In each segment, Victor asks a family member a popular scientific question, following an extensive answer by said family member/s with a particular expertise in the field of science involved in the question. Each of these segments has its short intro and The End sketches for the specific characters. Each sketch is titled <(character name/s) in (topic)>.
Before the end credits in each episode, Max asks Victor "Well Victor, what did you learn today?" to which he begins with "Tons of neat stuff", summarizing again what his family members taught him. Max answers, "Sounds like a real big day." and Victor concludes, "It was, but I still have plenty of questions left for next time."

== Characters ==
- Victor
  - A baby and the main protagonist of the series. All times he has questions (though these are smarter ones) to explain his family members like any other kid. He has blonde hair, and usually only wears a light blue diaper.
- Max — Technology and electronics
  - Victor's intelligent father and a stereotypical mechanic/handyman. He is Vanilla's husband, Eartha and Matik's son and Micro and Scopo's brother. He seems to be the closest to Victor compared to the others. Resembles his mother Eartha and is rarely seen without his cap.
- Vanilla and birds Kwik and Kwak — Botany and zoology
  - Vanilla is Max's wife, Eartha and Matik's daughter-in-law, Micro and Scopo's sister-in-law, and Victor's mother who he resembles. Kwik and Kwak are running gags of their episodes and normally argue.
- Eartha (as her name suggests) and Basalt the dinosaur — Geography, geology and meteorology
  - Matik's wife, Max, Micro and Scopo's mother, Vanilla's mother-in-law, and Victor's grandmother who also cooks for their family. Basalt is a green dinosaur with orange spots & can be greedy. He can transform into any mode of transport & time travel.
- Micro and Scopo — Biology of the human body
  - Victor's uncles and Max's brothers who are running gags. Micro is stubby and wears a white cowboy hat (is sometimes seen without it), does most of the statements in their episodes. Scopo is the larger and dumber of the brothers, being the test subject yet expresses his own knowledge at times. They both have what look like masks and 'dog ears' like their father, Matik.
- Matik and dog Zygo — Astronomy and the Universe
  - Victor's grandfather, Max, Micro and Scopo's father, and Eartha's husband who has 'dog ears' and is rarely seen without his pilot hat. Zygo sounds like Daffy Duck from Looney Tunes and has webbed limbs.

== Episodes ==
#	Topic	Character(s)	Title
1	Camera	Max	Photo Opportunity
1	Illnesses	Micro & Scopo	Sick Leave
1	Solar System	Zygo & Matik	O Solar Mio
1	Volcanoes	Earth & Basalt	All You Need is Lava
1	Zebras	Vanilla, Kwik & Kwak	A Horse of a Different Color
2	Meteors	Zygo & Matik	Pleased to Meteor You
2	Car engine	Max	Idle Chatter
2	Bird wing	Vanilla, Kwik & Kwak	Feather Knows Best
2	Fossils	Eartha & Basalt	Shell Shock
2	DNA	Micro & Scopo	I Resemble Mama
3	Paresthesia	Micro & Scopo	Out on a Limb
3	Flowers	Vanilla, Kwik & Kwak	Petal Pushers
3	Gravity	Zygo & Matik	He Ain't Heavy, He's an Astronaut
3	Rain	Eartha & Basalt	Stormy Weather
3	Barcodes	Max	Bars & Stripes Forever
4	Sneeze	Micro & Scopo	Sneezed to Meet You
4	Remote control	Max	Beam My Baby
4	Plants	Vanilla, Kwik & Kwak	Green and Bear It
4	Thunder and lightning	Eartha & Basalt	Sound and the Why Whys
4	Stars	Zygo & Matik	Star Treatment
5	Spiders	Vanilla, Kwik & Kwak	Web Sight
5	Fax machine	Max	Just the Fax
5	Sweat	Micro & Scopo	No Sweat
5	Galaxy	Zygo & Matik	For Me and My Galaxy
5	Currents	Eartha & Basalt	Current Event
6	Brain	Micro & Scopo	Brain Waves
6	Photocopier	Max	Copy Cats
6	Bees	Vanilla, Kwik & Kwak	To Hive and Hive Not
6	Ice Age	Earth & Basalt	A Tree Froze in Brooklyn
6	Mars	Zygo & Matik	Mars Attracts
7	Mammals	Vanilla, Kwik & Kwak	Hair Today
7	Aeroplanes	Max	Plane Speaking
7	Solar eclipse	Zygo & Matik	Sun Blocked
7	Tides	Eartha & Basalt	Fit to Be Tide
7	Ear	Micro & Scopo	Hear and Now
8	Sunlight	Zygo & Matik	Light Entertainment
8	Telephone	Max	Dial-a-Why-Why
8	Smell and taste	Micro & Scopo	Common Scents
8	Mountains	Eartha & Basalt	Uphill All the Way
8	Coral reefs	Vanilla, Kwik & Kwak	Hail to the Reef
9	Lightning	Eartha & Basalt	A Bolt from the Blue
9	Bird sounds	Vanilla, Kwik & Kwak	Chirp Thrills
9	CDs	Max	Pit Stop
9	Space stations	Zygo & Matik	Station Break
9	Eye	Micro & Scopo	Oh Say Can You See
10	Wind	Eartha & Basalt	Breezy Does It
10	Refrigerator	Max	The Chill of It All
10	Gravity	Zygo & Matik	Down to Earth
10	Balanced diet	Micro & Scopo	Surely You Ingest
10	Cats	Vanilla, Kwik & Kwak	You've Gotta Be Kitten
11	Mosquitoes	Vanilla, Kwik & Kwak	A Bite to Remember
11	Sand	Eartha & Basalt	True Grit
11	Stars	Zygo & Matik	Great Balls of Fire
11	Elevators	Max	Ready Willing & Cable
11	Reflexes	Micro & Scopo	A Touchy Subject
12	Climates	Eartha & Basalt	Changing Climes
12	Leaves	Vanilla, Kwik & Kwak	Free Falling
12	Television	Max	Turn On… Tune In
12	Comets	Zygo & Matik	Dust to Us
12	Digestion	Micro & Scopo	Eater's Digest
13	Ocean's bottom	Eartha & Basalt	Bottom Feeders
13	Snakes	Vanilla, Kwik & Kwak	No Skin Off My Back
13	Light bulb	Max	Lights Out!
13	Day and night	Zygo & Matik	Sunrise… Sunset
13	Breathing	Micro & Scopo	Air Apparent
14	Fog	Eartha & Basalt	Another Fine Mist
14	Helicopter	Max	The Big Cover Up
14	Bats	Vanilla, Kwik & Kwak	Blind Leading the Blind
14	Cavities	Micro & Scopo	Nothing but the Tooth
14	Seasons	Zygo & Matik	Season's Greetings
15	Coal and oil	Eartha & Basalt	No Fuel Like Old Fuel
15	Submarine	Max	Way Down Under
15	Cactus	Vanilla, Kwik & Kwak	Cactus if You Can
15	Scabs	Micro & Scopo	A Cut Above
15	Satellites	Zygo & Matik	Global Swarming
16	Kangaroos	Vanilla, Kwik & Kwak	It's in the Bag
16	Microwave oven	Max	Nuking It Out!
16	Fungi	Vanilla, Kwik & Kwak	A Fungus Among Us
16	Heart	Micro & Scopo	To Bleed or Not to Bleed
16	Moon	Zygo & Matik	Craters and Cream Cheese
17	Snow	Eartha & Basalt	Snow Job
17	Solar power	Max	Sunday Punch
17	Marine life	Vanilla, Kwik & Kwak	Victor and the Glow Fish
17	Fever	Micro & Scopo	Heat Treatment
17	Washing machine	Max	Wash You Were Here
18	Frogs	Vanilla, Kwik & Kwak	One Giant Leap for Frogkind
18	Glue	Max	Stick Around
18	Nests	Vanilla, Kwik & Kwak	Branching Out
18	Dizziness	Micro & Scopo	Spin Doctors
18	Space telescopes	Zygo & Matik	Scope It Out
19	Evaporation	Eartha & Basalt	That Thing You Dew
19	Batteries	Max	The Powers That Be
19	Pollination	Vanilla, Kwik & Kwak	Blowin' in the Wind
19	Hair	Micro & Scopo	Hair-Raising Experience
19	Black holes	Zygo & Matik	Hole in One
20	Valleys	Eartha & Basalt	Ice Cycle
20	Light	Max	The Light Show
20	Earthquakes	Eartha & Basalt	Whole Lotta Shakin' Goin' On
20	Tears	Micro & Scopo	For Cryin' Out Loud
20	Venus and Mercury	Zygo & Matik	Hot! Hot! Hot!
21	Ozone layer	Eartha & Basalt	There's No Zone Like Ozone
21	Sleep	Micro & Scopo	Perchance to Dream
21	Cows	Vanilla, Kwik & Kwak	That Was Then, This is Cow
21	Projector	Max	Lights, Camera, Action!
21	Speech	Micro & Scopo	O' See Can You Say?
22	Deserts	Eartha & Basalt	How Dry I Am!
22	Jupiter	Zygo & Matik	Big
22	Butterflies	Vanilla, Kwik & Kwak	Ch Ch Ch Changes
22	Water purification	Max	Go with the Flow
22	Asteroid belts	Zygo & Matik	It's a Material Whirl
23	Rocks	Eartha & Basalt	Goldirocks
23	Growing up	Micro & Scopo	Home Grown
23	Roots	Vanilla, Kwik & Kwak	From the Ground… Up
23	Water	Eartha & Basalt	Water Water Everywhere
23	Space Travel	Zygo & Matik	One Giant Leap for Why Whys
24	Rivers	Eartha & Basalt	It's All Downhill from Here
24	Locks	Max	A Turn-Key Operation
24	Habitat	Vanilla, Kwik & Kwak	Sleeping In
24	Headaches	Micro & Scopo	Your Loss is Migraine
24	Planet rotation & revolution	Zygo & Matik	Moon Trek
25	Storms	Eartha & Basalt	Sooo Cool
25	Outer planets	Zygo & Matik	The Outer Planets
25	Dams	Max	Hold That Thought!
25	Brain	Micro & Scopo	Chuckleheads
25	Astrological symbols	Zygo & Matik	What's Your Sign?
26	Light	Eartha & Basalt	The Light Show
26	Lenses	Max	Thru the Looking Glass
26	Reptiles	Vanilla, Kwik & Kwak	Snakes Alive!
26	Muscles	Micro & Scopo	Only the Strong Survive
26	Asteroids	Zygo & Matik	It Came from Outer Space

== Voice cast ==
- Sammy Lane
- Heidi Lenhart
- Mendi Segal
- Stanley Gurd Jr. as Max
- Derek Patrick as Matic
- Genghis Studebaker as Zygo
- Kevin Schon as Micro (uncredited)
- Julie Maddalena as Victor (uncredited)

=== Crew ===
- Jamie Simone – Voice Director
- Bruno Bianchi – Producer, Director

== Release ==
=== Broadcast ===
The exact airdates of the 26 episodes are unknown; with some having a 1996 copyright date in the credits and others having a 1997 copyright date. In the United States, the series aired as part of a syndicated strand of Saban programmes called "The Saban Network for Kids!", later named "Saban Kids Network". The block included other, more action-oriented programmes such as Eagle Riders, Samurai Pizza Cats, season 1 of Dragon Ball Z and season 2 of Masked Rider. With the series airing on the block per the guidelines of the Federal Communications Commission, it marked Saban's first entry into the educational television market. The show was cancelled by Saban due to low ratings.

Ownership of the series passed to Disney in 2001 when Disney acquired Fox Kids Worldwide, which also includes Saban Entertainment. In the 2000s, it later ran as part of Disney's Jetix block.

=== Home media ===
As with many other Saban Entertainment series, the only major English-language DVD release is by Czech distributor North Video, featuring both Czech and English audio and original video (with English-language text) in the original production order. All 26 episodes were released on 8 volumes, from September 2 to October 21, 2010.
