= Saban's Adventures of Oliver Twist =

1996 television series

- Title screen
- Directed by: Bruno Bianchi
- Theme music composer: Haim Saban; Shuki Levy; (as Michel Dax)
- Countries of origin: United States; France
- Original languages: English; French
- No. of episodes: 52

Production
- Executive producers: Vincent Chalvon Demersay; Jacqueline Tordjman; Eric Rollman; Sam Ewing
- Producer: Jamie Simone
- Production companies: Saban Entertainment; Saban International Paris

Original release
- Network: Fox Kids (international); First-run syndication (U.S.); TF1 (France)
- Release: February 1, 1996 – February 12, 1997

Saban's Adventures of Oliver Twist (French: Les Nouvelles Aventures d'Oliver Twist, lit. "The New Adventures of Oliver Twist", also known as Oliver Twist) is a children's animated series created by Saban Entertainment. The series first aired in the United States from 1 February 1996 to 12 February 1997 through the company's syndicated "The Saban Network for Kids!" strand, totaling 52 episodes. The series began airing in France on TF1 on September 1, 1997, and on Fox Kids (starting with Fox Kids Netherlands and Fox Kids UK feeds later expanded airs on other feeds) on internationally.

Ownership of the series passed to Disney in 2001 when Disney acquired Fox Kids Worldwide, which also includes Saban Entertainment.

Loosely based on the 1838 novel Oliver Twist by Charles Dickens, the series features anthropomorphic animals and occasionally humans.

== Characters ==
- Oliver Twist (voiced by Mona Marshall) – A dog. An orphan on the run from the workhouse, trying to earn the respect of his friends Dodger and Charlie and hoping to find his mother, whom he got separated from.
- Artful Dodger (voiced by Brianne Siddall) – A rabbit. A cunning sort who is full of ideas.
- Charlie Bates (voiced by Tony Pope) – A pig. A laid-back sort who is pretty accident-prone and greedy for food.
- Fagin (voiced by Bob MacGarva) – A red fox. Leader of the fellowship of young thieves. In most episodes, he is also the narrator of the story.
- Princess Annushka (voiced by Barbara Goodson) – A dog. She is a runaway Russian princess who gives little regard for the boys and stays with Fagin's fellowship.
- Nancy (voiced by Mona Marshall) – A cat. A courteous and kind sort, who dreams of becoming an actress and stays with Fagin's fellowship.
- Mr. Bumble – A wolf. Old and crude, he is the master of the workhouse.
- Scratch and Sniff – Two cats. They are sent by Mr. Bumble to capture Oliver and bring him back to the workhouse.
- Bill Sikes – A brown bear. A brutish ruffian of a man who makes threats by extortion and intimidation to gain his money. He is sometimes accompanied by a gang of thieving river rats with Big Cheese as his second-in-command.

== Plot ==
Oliver escapes the orphan house and is on the run. While on the run he meets Dodger and together they go to Fagin. Fagin is the boss of a little gang and Oliver must prove himself, if he is worthy to stay; the workhouse master won't stop to bring Oliver back to the workhouse.

Oliver and his friends, Dodger and Charlie, are making it a mission to find Oliver's mother and they make adventures along the way.

== Episodes ==
No.	Title	Original release date
1	"Oliver's Narrow Escape"	February 1, 1996
Oliver makes his escape from the workhouse and his newfound friend, Dodger leads him to the hideout of his fellowship led by Fagin. To ensure his stay, Oliver has to pass three tests, whilst avoiding Mr. Bumble and his two goons, Scratch and Sniff.
2	"Horsing Around"	TBA
Oliver, Dodger, and Charlie go to the Ascott Steeple Chase in disguise. They get involved in the horse race eventually winning first place and Nancy comes in disguise to save them from Mr. Bumble and his duo who eventually get arrested for unintentionally harassing the queen.
3	"Show Time"	TBA
During a game of tag and after retrieving Oliver's locket from the sewers, Oliver, Dodger, and Charlie acquire an alligator from the sewers, hoping to start up a show with Annushka as well behind Fagin's back since the latter refuses to keep it, but Bill Sykes takes charge for the show. For that, Dodger sets the alligator loose on Bill, then sets it free when they realize she has a family of her own. Then, Fagin arrives and takes the earned money to pay for the damages caused by the alligator earlier.
4	"That's the Spirit"	TBA
Oliver, Dodger, and Charlie set off to rescue Fagin who is being held prisoner in the Tower. With the help of the ghost of a disgraced knight, Charlie frees Fagin and they make their escape while facing two evil ghosts.
5	"The Big Cheese"	TBA
After evading Scratch and Sniff again, Dodger is mistaken for a French Prince. Roquefort is trying to overthrow the French Prince to prevent a trade agreement for his own business. Oliver and Charlie help Dodger and they manage to trap Roquefort as the real prince arrives. After being rewarded with Limbirger cheese for their services, the boys find themselves being chased by Scratch and Sniff again.
6	"Misfortune Teller"	TBA
While playing a game of tag, Oliver, Dodger, and Charlie come across a fortune teller named Madame Yazma in a caravan who tells them about a hidden treasure they will be lucky to find, so, they decide to enter a treasure finding competition hosted by two gentlemen: Vigo and Rigo while competing with other competitors: Avey and Jake. Little do they realize that they are actually being conned and manipulated into digging tunnels that lead to a vault filled with gold and money in the Bank of England that they are to load for the gentlemen revealed to be con men and thieving brothers with the fortune teller revealed to be their mother acting as their leader to steal for themselves. Working together, they manage to escape the robbers and get them thrown in Scotland Yard.
7	"Tour of the Town"	TBA
To earn some money, Oliver, Dodger, and Charlie decide to host a sightseeing tour of London for tourists in a goat carriage, but Bill Sykes wants to host one himself and so, tries to sabotage the boys' tour attraction countless times so that tourists will pay to go on his tours instead then a battle between tour guides begins. Finally, using Fagin's latest horseless carriage invention, the boys manage to get their customers back and put an end to Sikes' tour attraction once and for all.
8	"Night Odyssey"	TBA
After Dodger reminisces about how he met and joined Fagin's Fellowship with Oliver and Charley, the boys decide to follow a clue inscribed in Latin and translated by Fagin on Oliver's locket that just might lead them to Oliver's long-lost mother, hoping to reunite with her at last. The boys arrive at the river landing, only to find themselves on board a barge where Sikes and his thugs: Big Cheese and the River Rats are hiding from the law after having robbed jewels and golden artifacts earlier and before setting sail. Having no other alternative, the boys try to hide inside while avoiding detection but to no avail once they are discovered and captured by Sikes and his thugs. After Sikes throws them overboard and nearly runs them over, the boys decide to head out on a raft and stop Sikes from getting away with the stolen loot rather than go back on land. Having made it back on board, the boys try to outwit their enemies at every turn until they finally get the barge to return to port where the thieves are finally arrested while Sikes finds himself being chased by the police after slipping through custody momentarily. Though glad to having saved the day and being awarded a hero like his friends by the police, Oliver appears disappointed for not finding his mother as he had hoped at first until he finds another clue that just might help him reunite with her just yet someday.
9	"Annushka's Winter Tale"	TBA
It's wintertime in London. Tired of being treated like peasants during a sleigh ride for Annushka, Dodger tries to stand up to her only for him, Oliver, and Charlie to find themselves being chased by Mr. Bumble again, leaving Annushka alone, humiliated, and insulted. After another failed attempt to capture the boys, Bumble chooses to take Annushka back to the workhouse instead to be used as bait for the boys. Nevertheless, Annushka proves to be more than Bumble bargained for when she begins to drive him mad with her attitude and habits. Feeling bad for Annushka, Oliver decides to give himself up despite his friends' objections. Luckily, the boys talk Oliver into a new plan but before executing it, Bumble, having had enough of her, releases Annushka and the boys, not wanting their hard work going to waste, proceed to throw snowballs at Bumble and his goons either way. Then, the boys find themselves reluctantly pulling an ungrateful Annushka on her sleigh again back home.
10	"Full of Hot Air"	TBA
After receiving a science lesson and demonstration about the effects of hot air from Fagin, Dodger talks Oliver and Charlie into building a hot air balloon to host a ride up and down in the air. However, after completing the balloon, Annushka unwittingly unties the rope holding the balloon to the ground and ends up flying with the boys in it over London. After a bird pokes a hole in the balloon, a whining, homesick Annushka and the boys end up lost in a forest. The boys head into the forest to find something to help repair the balloon before a storm arrives while Annushka stays behind. After much difficulty, the boys finally repair the balloon using tree sap, but their happiness is cut short when a forest fire appears. Once they're up in the air again and using salt from the weight bags, they are able to create rain to put out the fire just in time before it spreads. After making it back home, Dodger ends up being chased by an angry Annushka after joking with her about a charge for the ride.
11	"What a Nag"	TBA
Sick with the flu, Fagin entrusts his entire life savings with Oliver, Dodger, and Charlie to help him finally fulfill his dream of buying a horse and carriage he can afford in order to become a coachman. Unfortunately, the only available horse (later named Paint) and carriage turn out to be old, so, the boys decide to buy them, renovate the carriage with Nancy's help, and enter the 10th Annual All-London Carriage Race in order to win the Queen's carriage for Fagin while competing against a dirty, obnoxious champion racer: "Big Ben" Wheelright. After winning the race and earning the prize by default due to Wheelright's cheating antics and sabotage attempts, Fagin is pleased with his new horse and carriage and appoints Nancy as his official horse trainer and the boys as his official assistant drivers.
12	"Hair & There"	TBA
Struck with an intense heat wave all over London, the boys decide to start up their own hair-cutting business to earn money to buy ice cream like everyone else using Nancy's scissors without permission. Unfortunately, their only customer happens to be Bill Sikes who eventually ends up chasing the boys across the city when he discovers the horrible haircut they unintentionally gave him; realizing he had been conned the whole time. Meanwhile, Nancy worries about her missing scissors; not realizing they've been taken and damaged after Dodger used them to cut Sikes' hair earlier. Once back home, Nancy eventually discovers the truth and somehow decides to help the boys out on certain conditions afterwards. After Nancy falsely compliments Sikes, the boys are forced to do all of Nancy's water collecting for a week as they discover to their surprise that everyone else has somehow adopted Sikes' new hairstyle on the way as well.
13	"Treasure Hunt"	TBA
Having found a map leading to Sir Francis Drake's secret treasure while playing pirates one evening, the boys decide to go on a treasure hunt. After facing many difficulties on the way, they unintentionally end up at the workhouse where Oliver gets captured by Bumble and his goons and thrown in a cell. With a little help from the other orphans, Dodger and Charlie manage to free Oliver, defeat Bumble's goons, and escape the workhouse once again. On the way back home, the boys finally locate the treasure which turns out to be nothing more than just old laundry, not knowing that the real treasure is hidden beneath it; much to their despair.
14	"Ship Unshape"	TBA
Determined to go on an adventure and see the world, the boys sign up for what they think is a tour and end up joining the Royal Navy as cabin boys instead. But their troubles only get worse when the Royal Navy finds itself under attack by pirates and the boys end up captured by them and working as the pirate captain's galley slaves instead. After blowing up the pirate ship during the battle between the pirates and the Royal Navy and the pirates are arrested, the boys are commended as heroes by the captain for saving the day and hereby released from Royal Navy duties and obligations and are invited to join the crew anytime they wish.
15	"Chimney Sweeps Gang"	TBA
After an awry race across London, Dodger gets himself and his two friends involved in a chimney sweeping job, but their masters, Algernon and Ernest are only using this as a cover to steal from houses while the boys take the blame for the robberies. So, the boys decide to catch the real crooks in their latest heist at Buckingham Palace and clear their names. Then, the Queen offers the boys a reward in gratitude for capturing the crooks before heading back home.
16	"3 Boys and a Baby"	TBA
After celebrating Fagin's umpteenth birthday and realizing how he's getting on in his old age, Oliver, Dodger, and Charlie decide to travel to Mount McMayhem in Scotland to find the legendary Fountain of Youth to help Fagin relive his golden years again. Once there, they meet the immortal guardian of the Fountain who gives them both a few drops from the Fountain and a box containing a list of ingredients for the antidote in case anything goes wrong. However, after sprinkling a few drops on Fagin, Fagin suddenly regresses into a mischievous little infant who proves to be more than the boys had bargained for as they try to catch him across London. While Charlie entertains Fagin, Oliver and Dodger gather the ingredients for the antidote to sprinkle on him, which restores him back to normal while still retaining a few of his childlike habits though.
17	"Thank you Fagin"	TBA
After celebrating Fellowship Day; thanks to Fagin, Oliver, Dodger, and Charlie want to show Fagin how they feel about him by doing something special for him in gratitude. Seeing the Queen's carriage pass by the streets of London, the boys arrange for Fagin to meet the Queen herself in person by organizing a minor accident with one of her carriage's wheels while some thieves, Big Jim and Alfy plan to kidnap the Queen for ransom the next day as well. At night, after a little test run performed by the fellowship, the thieves decide to use them to further execute their plan. The next day, after the boys' plan works and before Fagin has a chance to meet the Queen and fix her wheel, the thieves make their move despite Fagin's best efforts to save her. So, Fagin decides to mount a rescue mission with the boys and Annushka. On the way, Fagin reveals that he once worked for Big Jim for a short time in the past, whom he recognized by his cane as the mastermind behind this plot and whom he left once he realized what sort of man he was working for. After rescuing the Queen despite certain difficulties, the Queen thanks them; especially, Fagin, whom she gives her ring to should he ever need her help by sending the ring to the palace to return the favor.
18	"Disguise and Dolls"	TBA
When Fagin and his fellowship's home becomes infested with wood-eating termites eating all of the wooden furniture, Fagin sends the boys to the hardware store to get a formula that will drive the termites away before they start eating the rest of the wood. Unfortunately, after buying the formula, the boys find themselves being pursued by Bill Sikes mistaking the formula for gold dust. To hide from him, they disguise themselves as schoolgirls in the train station but later find themselves joining the school as well.
19	"Good Sports"	TBA
It's springtime in London. Fagin arranges for his friends to play the first Annual Fellowship Cross-City Golf Tournament from home till Trafalgar Square; much to their joy. However, the game soon becomes a competition where everybody minus Fagin and Charlie starts fighting and sabotaging each one's shot in his/her own way for the price to win a week-off from chores. At the end of the day, after Oliver and Dodger compete and fail in a tie-match, Charlie is declared the winner since he's learned the most important lesson about friendship and fun during the game.
20	"A Trunk Full of Surprises"	TBA
Oliver, Dodger, and Charlie come to see a rare blue elephant named Momo owned and brought from Zulemaine to England at the explorer society for two days by the beautiful Princess Masha, who later becomes the object of both Oliver and Dodger's rival affections along the way. However, due to an accident while trying to get a better look at the elephant, the boys unintentionally set Momo loose on the streets. To make it up to the heartbroken princess, the boys decide to help her retrieve her friend while preventing two unscrupulous big-game hunters from the hunter society: Lord Sureshot and Slug from shooting and hunting the elephant down during a safari. When trying to search for her elephant as well, the princess finds herself captured and used as bait by the hunters. Luckily, the boys manage to find the elephant, save the princess, and stop the hunters once and for all.
21	"Get My Goat"	TBA
Still persistent on capturing Oliver and his friends, Bumble sends his goons after them. Meanwhile, the boys' latest scheme involves a delivery service to help people with deliveries everywhere using an abandoned goat they acquire after much difficulties to pull their makeshift cart. Having learned of this job, Scratch and Sniff inform Bumble who in turn, decides to use this to his advantage in capturing Oliver and his friends yet. After luring the boys into a trap, Bumble and his goons take Oliver back to the workhouse while leaving Dodger and Charlie tied up somewhere. After breaking free from their bonds with a little help from the goat, Dodger and Charlie catch up to Bumble and his goons and rescue Oliver at the last minute.
22	"River Regata"	TBA
Determined to save Dodger's old kindergarten school from closing down and sending the children to the workhouse due to a late tax fee of £500 within a day, Oliver, Dodger, and Charlie enter a boat race, the River Regata, and so does Bill Sikes for a prize of £600. Determined to win and aided by his thugs, Sikes tries to sabotage their boat in every attempt.
23	"Clowning Around"	TBA
Having earned enough money from all the muffins she's baked and sold, Annushka's dream to go to a Russian circus and see a famous acrobatic clown troupe act finally becomes a reality. The boys want to join in as well but are refused entry by Bill Sikes currently working as the circus' security guard since they're broke. So, the boys dress up as clowns and sneak in with ease. After Sikes naively mistakes the real clowns for the boys and locks them up, the boys decide to take their places in the upcoming act in order not to disappoint Annushka but to no avail once they find themselves surrounded and chased by lions and tigers. After Annushka fails to free the real clowns; thanks to Sikes' stupidity, thieves plan to steal all the money they earned from the paying customers. Luckily, with a little help from a monkey, Annushka helps free the clowns to save the act after the boys' own act against a pursuing Sikes leaves the crowd laughing. After Annushka joins in the act with the clowns and succeeds, Charlie discovers the theft, so, the boys decide to save the circus.
24	"Landing in London"	TBA
After the boys discover an old-fashioned printing press when thinking about life on the Moon, Dodger decides to open up their own newspaper, which they agree as long as they stick to the truth as pointed out by Fagin. When their stories prove unsuccessful from all the scoops they've collected to sell, Dodger goes to extreme lengths with exaggerated stories about space creatures invading London up to a point where the boys dress up as space creatures, which leaves the entire town panic-stricken and in a riot. After Fagin discovers the truth behind Dodger's latest scheme, the boys are ordered to go out and explain everything to the people but find themselves being chased by an angry mob either way.
25	"Snow on the Go"	TBA
Struck with an intense cold wave with snow all over London, Dodger's latest scheme has the boys starting up their own snow cleaning service when they see how hard it is for people to clean up the immense snow around town. Using Fagin's air blower, the boys demonstrate their business to everyone at Bill Sikes' house, which goes without difficulty this time. Soon, business grows and so does a snowball formed from all the snow cleared at the same time. When the boys go out searching for the girls looking for them, they come across the giant snowball which begins to roll down and cause trouble for everyone including Sikes whose home gets smashed to pieces, leaving the girls temporarily trapped in a pit; thanks to Charlie's clumsiness. So, the boys set out to save London and stop the giant snowball from causing anymore damage while evading an angry, vengeful Sikes. With the snowball stopped by fishing nets and partially destroyed by a provoked Sikes, the boys and girls who managed to escape the pit by working together despite their differences return home with the air blower to stay warm all winter.
26	"Somewhere"	TBA
Inspired by Fagin's latest detective story, when the boys deliver one of Fagin's inventions to a certain Lady Hoffington, they suddenly find themselves having to solve the mystery behind the theft of the lady's priceless golden garland. During the investigation, Oliver gets temporarily sidetracked by a song he recognizes that only his mother knew and used to sing to him. Eventually, the boys discover the thief to be a bird using the garland for its temporary nest and imitating the song Oliver remembers, thus, giving him hope that his mother is still out there waiting to be reunited with him.
27	"Loads 'O Toads"	TBA
Wanting to see a pageant show at Buckingham Palace, the boys agree to help an old man catch 15 frogs for him in exchange for money to get into the show. Once they've caught all 15 frogs as promised, they discover that the old man has sold them to Scratch and Sniff for Bumble's latest plan to put them to work on his invention to do 10 times as much work as the orphans. Though the boys' rescue attempts allows the frogs to go free, Charlie ends up caught in their place instead. Luckily, the frogs come to rescue Charlie and destroy Bumble's invention. Then, with the frogs' help, the boys finally make it to the pageant while evading Bumble and his goons once again. At the show, Bumble and his goons are arrested and put on kitchen duty for supposedly bringing wild animals on the palace grounds. Later, the boys along with the frogs are able to see the show using stilts.
28	"Tsarina for a Day"	TBA
Annushka earns the role of a Tsarina in a play with the boys accompanying her to the theater where they meet Prince Gregor, much to Annushka's joy and excitement. Meanwhile, an elderly Russian couple working as stagehands plans to steal the prince's golden Fabergé egg. Charlie has heard the whole thing but no one listens or believes him except Oliver and Dodger, so, they plot to thwart the thieves' plan. Unfortunately, their attempts ruin the play, make it a laughingstock, and get them kicked out despite the thieves' plan thwarted momentarily. After the thieves make another attempt, both the boys and Annushka manage to foil their plans once and for all. Finally, the grateful prince rewards Annushka and the boys with a ride in his carriage and egg sandwiches in gratitude for saving both him and the egg.
29	"Pudding 'Em in Their Place"	TBA
With London suffering so much heavy rain, Dodger's latest scheme has the boys use Annushka's pudding to plug all the leaks in both their home and everyone else's while leading Annushka to believe that she'll have enough money to buy boat passages back to Russia after making and selling more pudding. However, their latest customers' house becomes the target of Big Cheese and the River Rats where they begin stealing many valuables. So, the boys plot to thwart the thieves' plan. Their first attempt fails but the next one momentarily foils the thieves' plan. Meanwhile, Annushka discovers the boys' deception with her pudding and decides to go out and confront them. Ironically, her intervention helps the boys save the day in the end. Once the thieves are arrested, both Annushka and the boys are rewarded. In order to earn Annushka's forgiveness for their deception, the boys are forced to eat pudding as punishment.
30	"The Not-so-great Train Robbery"	TBA
31	"That's Snow Way to Spend the Day"	TBA
32	"The Boys and the Bees"	TBA
33	"Oliver's Other Mother"	TBA
34	"River Raiders"	TBA
35	"Undercover Brother"	TBA
36	"The Little Lie"	TBA
37	"Jerkyl and Snide"	TBA
38	"King of a Dragon"	TBA
39	"New Friend At the Fellowship"	TBA
40	"Common Census"	TBA
41	"My Fair Fagin"	TBA
42	"The Long and The Short of It"	TBA
43	"It Takes Two to Tangle"	TBA
44	"The Trojan Cake"	TBA
45	"Muddadh Knows Best"	TBA
46	"You Can Go Home Again"	TBA
47	"The Great London Scavenger Hunt"	TBA
48	"Mystery Trail"	TBA
49	"Annushka's Game"	TBA
50	"Three Sides to Every Story"	TBA
51	"Ski No Evil"	TBA
52	"Major Magic"	February 12, 1997

== Home media ==
As with many other Saban Entertainment series, the only major English-language DVD release is by Czech distributor North Video, featuring both Czech and English audio and original video (with English-language text) in the original production order. The first 18 episodes were released on 6 volumes, from September 24 to October 29, 2010.
