= NASCAR Racers =

Television series

- Genre: Animated Series; Action; Science fiction
- Created by: NASCAR
- Developed by: Mark Edens
- Directed by: Dennis Woodyard; Joe Barruso
- Voices of: Ian James Corlett; Rino Romano; Kathleen Barr; Roger R. Cross; Andrew Francis; Richard Newman; Dale Wilson; Ron Halder; Scott McNeil; Kirby Morrow
- Theme music composer: Jeremy Sweet
- Composers: Jeremy Sweet; Alexander Van Bubenheim; David Hilker; John Costello; Shuki Levy; Kussa Mahchi
- Countries of origin: United States
- No. of seasons: 2
- No. of episodes: 26

Production
- Executive producer: Eric S. Rollman
- Producer: Dennis Woodyard
- Running time: 20 min.
- Production company: Saban Entertainment

Original release
- Network: Fox Kids (United States)
- Release: November 20, 1999 – March 24, 2001

NASCAR Racers is an American animated television series by Saban Entertainment which features two rival NASCAR racing teams, Team Fastex and Team Rexcor, competing against each other in the futuristic NASCAR Unlimited Division. The series ran from 1999 to 2001 on Fox Kids. Ownership of the series passed to Disney in 2001 when Disney acquired Fox Kids Worldwide, which also includes Saban Entertainment.

The racing scenes around complicated futuristic tracks were 3D computer animation, while the characters were drawn in traditional 2D cel animation.

== Premise ==
While real life NASCAR tracks are mainly ovals, NASCAR Racers is anything but. The racers compete on a wide variety of courses, including road course, off-road, mountain, and Motorsphere. The Motorsphere track starts with a typical race track leading into a sphere, then tracks are wrapped around the inner surface of the sphere.

The NASCAR Unlimited Division features cutting edge, over-the-top technologies (from the show's point of view). To protect drivers from crashes, each race car has an inner Rescue Racer that ejects from the outer body if an accident happens. XPT racers, introduced in season 2, are the new race cars for Team Fastex. XPT racers use atomic fuel run by forced-combustion systems. Nitro Racers contain high-flux fusion units that can get maximum power out of atomic fuel.

The change in body design from the XPT racers to the Nitro Racers was similar to the NASCAR Cup Series' transition to the Car of Tomorrow. XPT racers were sleeker than the boxy Nitro Racers.

== Characters ==
The characters often race on simulators to hone their skills before actual races; this is also done by real NASCAR drivers.

=== Team Fastex ===
- Mark "Charger" McCutchen (Ian James Corlett) (4 Wins): Mark is the grandson of Mack McCutchen and son of Mack McCutchen Jr., two former NASCAR stars and a naturally skilled driver in his own right. Mark wants more than anything to live up to his family's racing legacy and manages to win the championship for Team Fastex in Season 1 after a heated race against Kent Steel. He was Lyle Owens' main rival even before the Unlimited Division started and also has a crush on Megan Fassler. He drives car #204.
- Megan "Spitfire" Fassler (Kathleen Barr) (3 Wins): Megan is the adoptive daughter of Jack Fassler, owner of Team Fastex, and the only female member of the team. At first, her father objects to her racing for the team, but he changes his mind early in the series. In season 2, Garner Rexton hires a woman to pose as Megan's real mother to confuse Megan about her past. Afterwards, Megan forms a team called the Spitfire Racers with Eve "Wild Card" Kilder, "Chrome" and Zorina. Eventually, she finds out about her true past and rejoins Fastex. She drives car #101.
- Carlos "Stunts" Rey (Rino Romano) (4 Wins): A former champion motorcycle racer, Carlos joined NASCAR to win money to pay for research on his ill father's ongoing medical treatments. Although he takes on several side projects such as a daredevil stunt driving and numerous commercial endorsements, his strong sense of loyalty keeps him with Team Fastex, even after losing most of his savings to a con man and being pressured by Garner Rexton to betray his teammates. He drives car #404.
- Steve "Flyer" Sharp (Roger R. Cross) (2 Wins): Steve was a fighter pilot in the U.S. Air Force years ago, but had to retire when he was exposed to a gaseous cloud of chemical nerve agent during a mission. He survived, but the nerve gas left him prone to sudden attacks of extreme nervousness, shaking and sweating. Steve joined NASCAR to prove to himself that he can still handle a high-pressure situation, but he knows that he is always at risk of an attack. He drives car #808.
- Jack Fassler (Richard Newman): Owner of Team Fastex, husband of Libby Fassler and adoptive father of Megan Fassler. A key founder of the NASCAR Unlimited division, Jack used most of his savings and a large bank loan to launch the races, but the bank that lent him money was bought out by his business rival Garner Rexton shortly after, effectively putting Jack in direct debt to Rexton and making beating his rival essential to pay back his debts. When he chose the team members for the first season, Jack disapproved of two things: letting Lyle Owens become a member of Team Fastex and letting Megan race for the team. He soon changes his mind about Megan since a four-driver team is needed to compete for the team championship.
- Douglas "Duck" Dunaka (Dale Wilson): Duck is the crew chief of the team and a master mechanic, although he had previously been a driver much earlier in his career. His past experience compels him to drive one race for Team Fastex as "Rubber Ducky" (Car #859) in the season 2 episode "Duck Unlimited" after Megan briefly leaves the team. Duck is very fond of greasy comfort food and has a knack for using his favorite tool, duct tape, to fix just about anything. He also has a daughter, Shelby, who hangs around the garage with Miles on occasion.
- Lugnut: Team Fastex mechanic who gets hired instantly by Jack and Duck at the start of the second season when he wanders into the garage and fixes a problem with Stunts' car that got Duck completely stumped. He later fixes a suspension problem on Stunts' car during a pit stop, which prompts Jack and Duck to offer him a raise. Later in the season, he serves as Crew Chief during the race Duck competes in and forms a friendship with Miles. Although very skilled as a mechanic, he is also very clumsy and has a tendency to trip and launch items that usually land on Duck.

=== Team Rexcor ===
- Lyle "The Collector" Owens (Scott McNeil) (2 Wins): A ruthless, cruel and arrogant driver, he is considered a menace to every NASCAR team. With his lethal driving skills, he is known to have caused many crashes in the past, from which he likes to collect a piece of the car afterward as a trophy, earning him the nickname "The Collector". Lyle is "Charger" McCutchen's number one rival from back when they were both candidates to join Team Fastex, which factored into Garner Rexton hiring him for Team Rexcor. Lyle is fired from Rexcor at the end of season 1, but is re-hired early in season 2 after he suffers a mutation due to contact with toxic waste, making him larger, stronger and more aggressive than any human being while giving him a hideously scarred face. He drives car #606.
- Hondo "Specter" Hines (1 Win): Hondo is one of the spookiest drivers in NASCAR. While very little is known of his past, he has a calm and calculating nature, superb driving skills, is an expert bully, and is not above cheating to win races. Hondo specializes in sneaking up behind rival cars and wrecking them before his opponents even know he's there, just like a ghost, but he will still team up with his Rexcor teammates to wreck an opponent and slip ahead of the pack. When not driving, he can usually be seen wearing dark sunglasses, even indoors. He drives car #303.
- Zorina (1 Win): A former model and body builder, Zorina is a vain and violent driver who will push anyone, even her own teammates, aside to clear her way to the front of the pack. Described by fellow drivers as "no lady", she is never intimidated by anyone, especially male competitors who might see her as a push-over. In season 2, Garner Rexton fires her from the team and replaces her with Tanker, forcing Zorina to ask Megan Fassler for a job driving with the Spitfire Racers, to which Megan wholeheartedly agrees. She drives car #505.
- Diesel "Junker" Spitz: Diesel used to drive race cars in Europe while secretly working for a gang of thieves that stole and resold expensive vehicles on the black market. After he was banned from racing overseas for sabotaging rival race cars, Garner Rexton recruited him to drive for Team Rexcor. Diesel is a highly skilled driver, but he seems to take more pleasure in wrecking other cars than actually competing to win races, earning him the nickname "Junker". Diesel speaks in a broken English-German dialect and his voice resembles that of actor and politician Arnold Schwarzenegger. He drives car #707.
- Garner Rexton (Ron Halder): The owner of Team Rexcor and usually the mastermind of anything that causes disaster in the NASCAR Unlimited series, as well as the main antagonist of the show. He is an arrogant, manipulative and hypocritical businessman who uses his sheer wealth and influence to control others and get them to do his dirty work. Many years ago, Garner was deeply in love with Jack Fassler's wife, Libby, but was left heartbroken when she rejected him and went on to marry his rival, Jack Fassler. Since then, Garner's only motivation in life has been the systematic destruction of Jack Fassler and his racing empire, and he will stop at nothing to achieve his revenge. He confirmed in one episode that he was the one who introduced Jack to Libby, to which Jack replied that he will always owe Garner for that. In addition to racing, Garner is also shown to be heavily involved in the production and overseas trafficking of illegal chemical weapons like the one "Flyer" was exposed to. Garner was ultimately banned from NASCAR for repeat offences involving race tampering after one person, "Stunts", finally had the nerve to stand up to him.
- Spex (Richard Newman): Team Rexcor crew chief and Garner Rexton's right-hand man. Spex is a cyborg who uses his special body tools to repair and maintain Rexcor's fleet of race cars. He also has a monitor screen built into his chest to provide others with face-to-face communication with Garner Rexton. He has a very cold and unfeeling nature and never hesitates to cheat in any way, which is reflective of his programming to always be loyal to Garner Rexton's cause.
- Kent "Demolisher" Steel (1 Win): An android built by Team Rexcor for the destruction of Team Fastex, Kent first appears towards the end of Season 1 as a reckless, powerful and destructive driver resembling a human. Being an android, however, he has no fear of death or any other human limitations, allowing him to achieve things on a race track no human driver ever could. Kent was later unmasked when "Charger" and Lyle Owens (who was driving under a different name) reluctantly teamed up to race against him, during which Lyle caused Kent to crash, revealing his robotic exo-skeleton and leading to Team Rexcor's disqualification from the championship. He later appears in episodes "Chain Reaction" where he tries to sabotage the fuel for the other teams, and "Rumble" as one of the drivers used in the free-for-all race. He drove car #500.

=== Other Unlimited Series Drivers ===
- "Redline" O'Rourke (1 Win) (Kirby Morrow): This driver is a mystery to most people in the NASCAR Unlimited series. No one knows his first name or how he got to be so good, but he can apparently use his extraordinary driving skills to get past any car he wants, making him a strong opponent and the number-two rival to "Charger" McCutchen. While he appears confident and a bit cocky, he always races fairly and honorably. However, he dislikes losing and on one occasion, outright refuses to celebrate a third-place finish with the Spitfire Racers. Like "Charger", he has a crush on Megan Fassler. He drives car #119.
- Phil "Octane" Knox: Known for the speed and power of his car, Phil first appears as a friendly rival to Team Fastex, but he secretly works for Rexcor. After "Flyer" saves his life after a mishap on a qualifying run, he and "Flyer" become good friends, but Phil later poisons "Flyer" with a powerful hallucinogenic drug, leading to a series of very dangerous on-track incidents where Flyer thought that he was back in his fighter jet. Later Phil tries to poison "Flyer" again just before the final race, but accidentally poisons himself instead, making him think that he was about to go over a waterfall. He drives car #420.
- "Tanker": Years ago, "Tanker" was in the Army and worked as a tank operator, but he was discharged under unknown circumstances. Just like how "Flyer's" car is modeled like a fighter jet, "Tanker's" car resembles a tank, which he uses to batter and bang up any other cars who dare to get in his way. The rocket booster on the top of his car doubles as a cannon, which he never hesitates to use on opponents. Noting his aggressive driving style and growing rivalry with "Flyer", Garner Rexton decides to add "Tanker" to Team Rexcor near the end of season 2, where he replaces Zorina. He drives car #817.
- "Grim Repo": A very tall and silent driver whose true name is unknown. He first appears at the beginning of season 2 together with the other four new racers ("Redline", "Tanker", "Chrome" and "Octane") and is rarely seen outside his car afterward. He is never shown without his skull-like helmet, so his real face is never seen and he also usually wears a cloak or cape, even while driving. He drives for Team Rexcor for one race in the episode "Rumble", and seems to form a rivalry with "Stunts", who likes to poke fun at his nickname. He drives car #860.
- "Chrome": She is the only female member of the group of new drivers from season 2 and uses her shiny chrome-plated car as an effective weapon in distracting other drivers in order to slip ahead of them on the race course. While very little is known of her past, her cool and confident attitude often intimidates her opponents. Late in Season 2, she joins Megan Fassler's Spitfire Racers team. She drives car #232.
- Eve "Wild Card" Kilder: A professional stunt driver whom Garner Rexton used to lure "Stunts" away from Team Fastex. She is arrested in season 1 for trying to kill Team Fastex with some rogue fireworks during a team stunt at the raceway. While in prison, Lyle Owens negotiates the loan of the car she used so he can compete undercover in the final race of season 1 using the nickname "Wild Card". She is later released in season 2, takes back the car and assumes the "Wild Card" nickname for herself in order to join the Spitfire Racers. Even after her time in prison, she still has a crush on "Stunts", but he no longer returns her affections. She drives car #413.
- Farrell Longstreet: A former racing colleague of "Charger" McCutchen's father who comes out of retirement to race in the Unlimited Series in season 2, driving car #993 without nickname. He appears to suffer a severe injury in a crash "Charger" accidentally caused and is forced to retire again, but the injuries were actually a ploy by Garner Rexton to get "Charger" to feel guilty and throw him off his game. After being reminded of his friendship with Mack McCutchen Jr., Longstreet betrays Rexton by driving "Charger's" car as a relief driver in the final race of the season, keeping Team Fastex in contention.

=== Other Team Fastex ===
- Libby Fassler: Wife of Jack Fassler and adoptive mother of Megan Fassler. A scientist who works to protect the world's rain forests, she spends a lot of time away from the racing community. In one episode, she is kidnapped by bounty hunters secretly hired by Garner Rexton, who proceeds to send his race team to try and save Libby so he can win her back to his side. However, this plan is undone by Team Fastex. Garner Rexton's love for Libby is his biggest motivation for revenge on Jack, but Libby and Jack both appear to be unaware of his feelings.
- Miles McCutchen (Andrew Francis): Younger brother of Mark McCutchen who aspires to race like his brother. He often can be seen helping Duck and Lugnut in the pits with odd jobs, but occasionally proves himself an even more valuable asset to the team, such as when he discovered Kent Steel's secret of being an android and foiling a plot involving Team Rexcor electronically manipulating Team Fastex cars. He is also good friends with Duck's daughter, Shelby.

=== Commentators ===
- Mike Hauger: A television presenter for Sports Network Interglobal Television (SNIT), alongside Pat Anther, who covers and commentates the NASCAR Unlimited Series races.
- Pat Anther: A television presenter for Sports Network Interglobal Television (SNIT), alongside Mike Hauger, who covers and commentates the NASCAR Unlimited Series races.

== Episodes ==
=== Season 1 (1999–2000) ===
No.	Title	Written by	Original release date	Prod. code
1	"The Real Thing"	Michael Edens	November 20, 1999	101
There is a new NASCAR series called the Unlimited Series, and team Fastex owner Jack Fassler has hired four racers: Mark "Charger" McCutchen, Steve "Flyer" Sharp, Carlos "Stunts" Rey and Lyle "Collector" Owens. He fired Lyle "The Collector" Owens for disruptive racing while he seeks a contract with Fassler's nemesis, Garner Rexton, owner of Rexcor. He spies Fassler, who has finished the prototype cars. While Flyer drives his car, he loses control on the track. The series premiered 6 days after Dale Jarrett clinched the Championship at the Pennzoil 400.
2	"The Stakes"	Mark Edens	November 21, 1999	102
Flyer manages to stop the car after losing control of it, but Jack is more concerned about letting his daughter Megan driving for the team. He finally gives her a chance reluctantly. At a banquet before the first race, Lyle challenges Mark to a race in the Rescue Racers at the quarry, and he agrees. However, the race is fixed and Charger's Rescue Racer flies off a closed road into a river.
3	"Heroes"	Mark Edens	November 22, 1999	103
Mark ends up in a river, but was subsequently saved. He also wins the first race of the championship after a grudge match against the Collector & Megan Fassler becomes Spitfire.
4	"Duck Out of the Way"	Michael Edens	February 5, 2000	104
Megan is badly injured in a race accident by Rexcor's microwave technology, and Jack blames Duck, who quits. Duck joins Rexcor, but is secretly spying on Rexcor to see if they are the ones responsible. It turns out that they have the microwave technology, and Jack and Duck have to stop Rexton from frying Fastex's cars on the next race.
5	"Co-Pilot"	Steve Cuden	February 12, 2000	105
Megan is training in the simulator when a mysterious figure meets her and asks her to drive for him against the computer. It is really The Collector hacking in the simulator, and he hooks up the simulator to his car so Megan will be driving it in the next race. She will have to realize that it's all a trap by The Collector.
6	"The Mission"	Scott Peterson	February 19, 2000	106
A military intelligence officer asks Flyer to destroy a chemical warfare factory while in an off-road race. Flyer must fight his way through Brock Van Leer's desert base, along with his friends, and destroy the chemicals.
7	"Always"	Matthew Edens	February 26, 2000	107
Lyle Owens rigs Charger's car to go out during an off-road race in Alaska. Charger encounters an airplane crash while being stranded, and a man trapped in the airplane calls out to Charger for help. The crash site, however, is decades old and is deserted. Charger wonders if the mysterious man was his father. But in the end, Hondo Hines wins and Fastex fails to win at Alaska.
8	"Boy vs. Machine"	Steve Cuden	March 4, 2000	108
After Miles accidentally takes over a computer-controlled car and creates chaos at the Fastex headquarters, Mark banishes him from the garage and the pits. Meanwhile, Garner Rexton schemes to reprogram the computer that controls the Motorsphere so that the sphere's morphing track will attack team Fastex cars during the next race and try to destroy them. Miles and Shelby are trapped inside the Motorsphere along team Fastex. As Fastex drivers struggle against the automated obstacles and lasers thrown at them by the Motorsphere, Miles uses his technical video game to disable the computer and save the day.
9	"Pulp Faction"	Michael Edens	April 1, 2000	109
While training in an off-road area in the South American laguna, Libby Fassler has been kidnapped by some bounty hunters secretly hired by Garner Rexton. By trying to bring her to his side, Garner sends out team Rexcor to try and save her, the same thing which Fastex does and succeeds.
10	"Daredevil"	Michael Edens	April 22, 2000	110
While training for some stunts, Carlos "Stunts" Rey jumps in partnership with a beautiful stunt-driver named Eve Kildere. Stunts begins falling for Eve, unaware that she's purposefully trying to lure him away from Team Fastex as a way of repaying a debt she owes Garner Rexton. In the end, she changes her mind in the last minute while some fireworks have been prepared to be launched during a stunt made by team Fastex, to kill them. Scared, she jumps in a car but is caught by Stunts and then arrested by the police.
11	"Flag Bearer"	Matthew Edens	April 29, 2000	111
After two victories for Team Rexcor (after winning Secada 500 and Tundra 2000), a new race has been prepared for both teams. Meanwhile, thieves being pursued by the police hide a new guidance component stolen from the government in Team Fastex's hauler, particularly in Flyer's car. But when the thieves come back to take the component, Flyer's car has been painted in red and white for the "All-American" highway cross-country race (like the American flag). As the thieves no longer recognize the car, they use monster trucks, bulldozers and a stolen helicopter to search for the component by destroying all cars in their way. One of the thieves tricked Hondo Hines and used his driver clothing to compete in this race as Specter of Team Rexcor.
12	"Every Man for Itself"	Michael Edens	May 6, 2000	112
The first season of the championship is getting to a closer end when Rexcor uses the new driver to compete against Fastex, the driver known as Kent "Demolisher" Steele. After Lyle Owens was fired and Steele hired, Fastex was also working on a "secret new weapon" for the last race: a supercar that pushes the performance envelope far beyond the team's regular cars. After the supercar lost control and disintegrated, Duck realized that the car was too hard to control for any human being, though Jack was very confident of victory. With the individual driving championship at stake, the Fastex drivers, each with an individual compulsion to win, no longer race as a team. Disunited, they fall easily as a prey to "Demolisher" Steele, who wins the race by destroying all Fastex cars. Garner knows that Steele will win again, because his new driver who replaces Lyle "Collector" Owens is, in fact, a superhuman android.
13	"All or Nothing"	Matthew Edens	May 13, 2000	113
With the last race of the championship at stake, team Fastex drivers manage to bury their differences and work as a team again. Together, they ask Jack about who is going to drive the new highly-experimented car, with the driver to be chosen at random. Megan and Miles tried to convince Charger not to drive the new car being afraid that they might lose him. Meanwhile, Lyle persuaded Eve Kildere from prison to use the Unlimited Series car to re-enter the last race as "The Mysterious Wild Card". Him and Charger together defeat Steele (who was exposed as an android and caused Rexcor's season disqualification for cheating) as Fastex wins the championship.

=== Season 2 (2000–2001) ===
No.	Title	Written by	Original release date	Prod. code
14	"Second Chance"	Michael Edens	October 28, 2000	201
It's the start of a brand-new NASCAR Unlimited Series season, and Team Fastex is back in their new XPT racers. But there are new kids in town, intent on crashing Jack Fassler's pre-season party. Redline, Octane, Chrome, Grim Repo, and Tanker challenge Fastex to a race, and with some additional goading from Rexcor drivers Zorina, Junker, and Specter, our heroes give in. Stunts, who's desperate to prove that he's no second-stringer to Charger, is disgusted when it appears his pre-race tangle with Grim Repo will keep him sidelined for the unplanned event. Fortunately for him, another new arrival in the garage area, "Lugnut" Gooch, gets him back on track to take the first checkered flag of the season.
15	"Toxic"	Mark Edens	November 4, 2000	202
A runaway reaction in a catalytic blender for the new atomic gasoline levels a fuel research lab in New Motor City, and nearly takes out Charger and Spitfire as well. Garner Rexton is disappointed at the news of their survival, but sees his chance to rectify the situation when Lyle Owens comes begging for his old job back. Garner agrees to The Collector's return if he takes Charger out before the first (official) race of the season. To fulfill his end of the evil bargain, Owens lures Charger into a trap in the burned fuel center. But in the end, it's The Collector that winds up taking the toxic bath while an injured Charger still manages to steal the checkered flag from Redline in an amazing last to first victory.
16	"Payday"	Matthew Edens	November 11, 2000	203
Though he managed to free himself from the toxic trap at the burned out fuel center, Charger did not escape unscathed. A dislocated vertebra leads to a dismal qualifying effort and a decision to sit out the second race of the new season. But when Team Rexcor's car #909 mystery driver is revealed as the mutated Lyle Owens, Charger is not about to give his would-be assassin the satisfaction of seeing him sidelined. The Collector is determined not to let Charger win another race, making several attempts to wreck him, including a final try on the last lap when his own barely functional car is a lap down. Yet Charger prevails, again snatching the checkered flag from Redline's grasp, this time thanks to an expert landing of his Rescue Racer on the hood of O'Roarke's car. This episode aired 1 day before Bobby Labonte clinched the Championship at the Pennzoil 400.
17	"Red Flag"	Michael Edens	November 18, 2000	204
Brock Van Leer is back, and out for revenge. After filling the top of the Motorsphere with vaporized atomic fuel, he threatens to blow up the spectator-filled arena unless Flyer steps forward in exchange for their lives. The noble Flyer of course does so, but Van Leer has no intention of disarming his ticking time bomb, as his plan is for vengeance against all of Team Fastex. While Flyer faces the daunting motor-enhanced strength of Van Leer's exo-skeleton, Charger, Stunts, and Spitfire have to figure out a way to climb and vent the Motorsphere while dodging bullets from Van Leer's henchmen and helicopter gunships.
18	"Chain Reaction"	Michael Edens	December 2, 2000	205
Team Fastex is hot — too hot! When their cars overheat and blinding smoke and fire force them off the track during time trials, it's pretty obvious that someone from Team Rexcor has been tampering with their temperature gauges. That someone actually turns out to be a something named Kent Steele. In a Van Leer-inspired plot, Garner Rexton's terminator android has sabotaged Team Fastex's atomic fuel mixture to not only torch their cars, but to blow another fuel center and much of New Motor City sky high. With Spitfire in the lead, Team Fastex exchanges their racing suits for radiation suits to take on the pseudo-man Steele.
19	"Rumble"	Michael Edens	December 9, 2000	206
Worth Dwindling cons new partner Carlos Rey into agreeing to the Stunts Café Million Dollar Rumble, an unofficial race at Big River Raceway. In other words — it's anything goes and dirty-tricks to the max! On the track, the Team Fastex drivers find themselves up against a new Team Rexcor consisting of The Collector, Kent Steele, Tanker, and Grim Repo, but what they don't know is that they're also facing Rexton, Junker, Specter, and Zorina thanks to remote-control devices planted under their hoods by a Charger-disguised Kent Steele the night before. It looks like instead of going to the bank, Team Fastex is going to get taken to the cleaners. Fortunately, Miles discovers the ploy, but unfortunately, he is only able to recruit the clumsy Lugnut to help him. Despite everything, Stunts still manages to pull off the win in his namesake race... yet still loses when Dwindling disappears with the prize money.
20	"Crash Course"	Steve Cuden	February 3, 2001	207
After seven races, the XPT cars are deemed too twitchy and are replaced by the new super-high-tech Nitro Racers. The high-flux fusion of these cars get maximum power out of atomic fuel, something the old-combustion systems never could. When Flyer refused to launch his Rescue Racer in favor of attempting to save his out-of-control car, Glorie (Flyer's girlfriend) can't bear to watch him risk his life behind the steering wheel, and decides to leave New Motor City with a plane. As fate would have it, aboard the same flight is Reed, an undercover operative for Garner Rexton who has stolen one of Fastex's fusion units for Rexcor to replicate. When a blizzard forces the pilot of the plane to turn back, Reed hijacks the flight, but only manages a crash landing atop a mountain. Flyer leads Team Fastex in a race against time up snow-choked logging trails to save Glory and the other crash victims, while the members of Team Rexcor try to beat them to Reed and the fusion unit for a big bonus from Rexton in their typical cheat-to-win fashion.
21	"El Dorado"	Michael Edens	February 10, 2001	208
There is a new race at the Inca 500, and Stunts takes the lead from Lyle Owens and Grim Repo. As he is in first place, he must save a man whose pickup truck rams off the Andes Mountain road course. The grateful Pablo has little to offer in debt except a golden coin and a story about a temple up in the mountains. After that, Carlos starts a treasure hunt alone being pursued by Rexcor. When the rest of the team finds out about the chase from Lugnut, they follow Stunts and try to help him defend against Rexcor drivers. After he found the temple, he is confused then captured by the villagers who are believing that Owens is their long-waited king, King Tehualpa. For him and his teammates to be free, Stunts challenges Owens to a duel with their cars as Charger helps him win and declines the treasure. When it has come to decline, the villagers realise that their king must be pure-hearted like Stunts. When the villagers are about to offer Stunts the treasure, he declines telling them to wait for their real king to come that will lead them. After team Fastex leaves the temple, the villagers found near the treasure Stunt's hood logo carved in rock. This Episode aired the Same day for qualifying for the 43rd Daytona 500 on February 18, 2001.
22	"The Wild Blue"	Scott Peterson	February 17, 2001	209
Old racer Farell Longstreet has returned to race once again in the NASCAR Unlimited series while he meets up first with Charger and Flyer. It has been some time since Steve saved Octane's life while he was falling from the Motorsphere and they became "friends", but as what Flyer doesn't know is that Octane is secretly working for Rexcor using hallucinogenic water to poison his mind. In the next race, Flyer hallucinates that he is in a combat mission and that everyone is his enemy. With Flyer having such a disadvantage, Tanker tries to destroy him and so does team Rexcor with the Rexcor Crunch, ultimately being saved by Stunts. After the race, Megan receives a message from a woman who claims to be her mother. This Episode aired 1 day before Dale Earnhardt died at the 2001 Daytona 500.
23	"Runaway"	Matthew Edens	March 3, 2001	210
Undergoing testing at the Motorcity hospital, Flyer unhappily must sit out the next race in which a stuck throttle causes Charger to inadvertently wreck the popular Farrell Longstreet. The NASCAR fans quickly turn against Charger, who heads home to Mobile, Alabama to consider whether to continue racing. Since everyone else in Team Fastex seems to be too busy to go after Charger, Flyer slips out of the hospital to find his friend, and ends up helping McCutchen save a school yard full of kids from a runaway delivery truck. The re-inspired drivers return to Fastex only to learn that Megan, who has confirmed through genetic testing that Jack and Libby Fassler are not her real parents, has quit the team.
24	"Duck Unlimited"	Michael Edens	March 10, 2001	211
After a one-on-one race "Stunts vs Mysterious Wild Card", Carlos has been badly wounded and needed emergency assistance. As the mysterious racer turned out to be Eve Kildere, Megan admits to her father Jack that she made her own team called "Spitfire Racers" and that Eve Kildere and Chrome are members of the team. Meanwhile, Garner Rexton decided to hire Tanker, subsequently firing Zorina as she swore vengeance and joined the "Spitfire Racers" instead. As in the next race, team Fastex's available drivers were only Charger and Flyer, with an injured Carlos, Farrell managed to convince Douglas Dunaka (the crew chief of the team) that he could compete as a racer at the next track to complete the four-man team. As Charger and Flyer were busy to help Duck "Rubber Ducky" Dunaka (#859) evade the Rexcor drivers, Megan won the race for her team with Eve Kildere finishing second and Redline third.
25	"Hostage"	Matthew Edens	March 17, 2001	212
While engaged in a motorcycle challenge with Stunts, Zorina is abducted by Junker and his underworld partners so that Rexton can "convince" her to help plant bombs in a plot to wipe out Team Fastex and steal the gate receipts from the next race. During the robbery, one of the thugs decides to abduct Jack Fassler as insurance. Megan gives up a chance for another Spitfire Racers win to save the only father she has ever known, and manages to barely escape being blown up alongside her former teammates. The singed, but reunited Team Fastex manages to recover the stolen cash and rescue Jack, who reveals to Megan that her birth mother made him and Libby promise not to tell Megan she was adopted.
26	"Last Chance"	Michael Edens	March 24, 2001	213
As Tanker wins the qualifying race against Flyer for Rexcor, Fastex began having doubts about winning the championship as Rexton's team and the other drivers were more advantaged at championship points. As Stunts was persuaded by Rexton to help Rexcor win the last race as he was trying to find a way to help his ill father from the hospital, Flyer found out about Octane poisoning his water with hallucinogenic substances as the last race started. Garner had a mental advantage, about cheating and trying to destroy team Fastex with his undercover team (Dwindling, Megan's impostor mother, Octane, and Farrell Longstreet who promised not to work for Rexcor ever again as he competed in the last race when Charger was injured again driving against Collector and Specter). With obstacles from Rexcor in every direction, will team Fastex survive and win?

== Production ==
Twenty-six half-hour episodes were produced by Saban Entertainment, in conjunction with the Vancouver-based Ocean Productions voice cast, who had worked with Saban on other projects — such as Spider-Man Unlimited and Dragon Ball Z. The show's theme song was composed and performed by Jeremy Sweet.

A major goal of the series was to introduce NASCAR racing to a younger audience, particularly given the sport's older demographics. At the same time, the show acknowledged NASCAR history in a nod to older fans, with the main character having characteristics of famous drivers, and real driver names mentioned during an altercation in the series premiere.

The series was co-written by brothers Mark and Michael Edens, better known for working on other projects such as X-Men: The Animated Series and Teenage Mutant Ninja Turtles. As with their other work, Mark wrote episode outlines, while Michael edited those into full scripts.

Although similar to other Saturday morning cartoons in having a primary objective of selling toys, with Hasbro being a production partner for the series, writing for NASCAR Racers turned out to be different in one important respect: because of the lower stakes of racing compared to defeating villains, the main characters were allowed to lose occasionally. Per Michael Edens:

The good guys didn't have to win in a sporting world. This wasn't a matter of saving the world. The story was the race itself and who was going to win. And when Rexcor won, it's because they cheated. That gave us depth of character.

That gave NASCAR Racers a different texture. It felt more real. You knew the good guys wouldn't win every time.

As Mark Edens recalls, the series was specifically envisioned as depicting a futuristic NASCAR to differentiate it from the actual races, a concept which found approval at the company:

Mark said it was his decision to make the show about a NASCAR of the distant future, needing a premise that could entice kids and lead to an interesting toy line.

"The problem with doing a sports show for kids is that you're competing with the real thing," Mark said. "Why wouldn't you just watch the actual race? You also have to come up with something that would compete against other cartoons and comic book stories.

"NASCAR agreed that we needed to do something that was over the top."

Mark said the scripts were sent to NASCAR for approval, but they never rejected anything that was submitted.

"They were protective of the brand, I'm sure," Mark said. "But they were really easy to work with. We didn't get anything but positive feedback."

== Release ==
=== Broadcast ===
Before beginning its proper run in 2000, NASCAR Racers premiered as a special three-part TV movie on November 11, 1999, although subsequent re-airings have the first three episodes separated from each other. It ended in 2001, with reruns airing on Disney's Jetix after the company's purchase of the Saban Entertainment library. The show was produced before Fox showed NASCAR races, and the show's broadcast history only overlapped with the network's coverage of the real series for one month.

=== Home media ===
Fox Kids and 20th Century Fox Home Entertainment released two VHS volumes of the series in 2000, each with 3 episodes.

As with many other Saban Entertainment series, the only major English-language DVD release is by Czech distributor North Video, featuring both Czech and English audio and original video (with English-language text) in the original production order. All 26 episodes were released on 8 volumes, from March 9 to June 1, 2010.

== In other media ==
=== Video game ===
A video game called NASCAR Racers was published in 2000 for Microsoft Windows and Game Boy Color by Hasbro and developed by Software Creations (PC) and Digital Eclipse (GBC). A PlayStation version was planned but cancelled before release.

=== Books ===
NASCAR Racers books were authored by Gene Hult under the name J. E. Bright, and published by HarperEntertainment.
