= List of BVS Entertainment productions =

This list article details programming libraries produced and/or distributed by the divisions and subsidiaries of BVS Entertainment, formerly Saban Entertainment, a dormant subsidiary of the Walt Disney Company, whose rights are managed with a few exceptions under its distributed by Disney Platform Distribution.

== BVS Entertainment ==
Between 1980 and 2001, the company produced and distributed animated programs through two branches; Saban Entertainment and Saban International Paris. while the production and distribution of live-action TV shows and movies was carried out through three separate branches; Saban Entertainment, Saban/Sherick Productions and Libra Pictures, targeting different audiences, especially adults.

As a result of acquisitions, agreements and partnerships made during its period of operations, Saban Entertainment acquired some ownership, distribution or intellectual property rights to animation libraries such as Fox Children's Productions, New World Animation/Marvel Productions, DIC Entertainment, Créativité et Développement, and DePatie–Freleng Enterprises. Saban began exclusively producing content for News Corporation's Fox Kids and Fox Family networks in 1998 and took over the global distribution of Fox Kids' pre-existing library. In addition, the company and its subsidiaries have collaborated with Canadian animation company CinéGroupe and European TV networks in the joint production of animated series. It has been involved in the co-production and distribution of animated series based on pre-existing characters and IPs from Marvel Comics and European comic book publishers, while cooperation was made when producing live-action programs with other American/Canadian production companies such as Shavick Entertainment and O'Hara-Horowitz Productions on films for television or the direct-to video market. In 2001, Disney terminated the operations of Saban/Sherick Productions and Libra Pictures after purchasing the company and its units. Following a series of re-brandings, the parent company BVS Entertainment (formerly Saban Entertainment) continued to produce the Power Rangers franchise, while SIP Animation (formerly Saban International Paris) continued to produce animation in collaboration with Fox Kids Europe/Jetix Europe for broadcast on Fox Kids and Jetix international networks. Following the acquisition in 2001, Buena Vista International Television took over the company's entire library and distribution network and continued distributing BVS shows until the shows were mostly vaulted by Disney in the late 2000s and BVS went dormant.

== TV series ==
=== BVS Entertainment ===
The company's main American unit produced television shows as Saban Entertainment until the last quarter of 2001, when program production continued in a more limited manner as BVS Entertainment. However, the BVS corporate umbrella also remained the parent company, holding the company's subsidiaries, even though shows produced or distributed by subsidiaries of the company are not credited to BVS' name.

==== Animated series ====
Title	Year(s)	Network	Notes
Saban Entertainment
Kidd Video	1984–85	NBC	co-production with DIC Enterprises
Kissyfur	1985–86; 1988	NBC	season 2 co-produced with DIC Enterprises for NBC Productions; music production for both seasons currently owned by Universal Television
Lazer Tag Academy	1986–87	NBC	co-production with Ruby-Spears Productions and Worlds of Wonder
ALF: The Animated Series	1987–89	NBC	co-production with DIC Enterprises for Alien Productions currently distributed by Shout! Studios
The New Archies	1987	NBC	co-production for DIC Enterprises and Archie Comics under the name of Riverdale Productions currently owned by WildBrain
ALF Tales	1988–89	NBC	co-production with DIC Enterprises for Alien Productions currently distributed by Shout! Studios
The Karate Kid	1989	NBC	co-production with DIC Enterprises for Columbia Pictures Television currently owned by Sony Pictures Television
Camp Candy	1989–92	NBC/Syndication	seasons 1 and 2 co-produced with DIC Enterprises
Kid 'n Play	1990	NBC	co-production with Marvel Productions
Little Shop	1991	Fox Kids Network (U.S.); La Cinq (France)	co-production with Marvel Productions and Créativité et Développement
X-Men	1992–97	Fox Kids Network	co-production with Graz Entertainment and Marvel Entertainment Group
Jin Jin and the Panda Patrol	1994	Fox Kids UK	co-production with Beijing Golden Panda Animation Company
BattleTech: The Animated Series	1994	Syndication	co-production with Worldwide Sports and Entertainment
Creepy Crawlers	1994–96	Syndication	co-production with Abrams/Gentile Entertainment
Tenko and the Guardians of the Magic	1995–96	Syndication	
Little Mouse on the Prairie	1996	Showcase	co-production with Afanti International Animation Corp.
Bureau of Alien Detectors	1996	UPN Kids	
The Mouse and the Monster	1996–97	UPN Kids	
Silver Surfer	1998	Fox Kids	co-production with Marvel Studios
Bad Dog	1998–99	Fox Family (U.S.); Teletoon (Canada)	co-production with CinéGroupe
Monster Farm	1998–1999	Fox Family	
The Secret Files of the Spy Dogs	1998–99	Fox Kids	
Mad Jack the Pirate	1998–99	Fox Kids	
The Avengers: United They Stand	1999–2000	Fox Kids	co-production with Marvel Studios
The Kids from Room 402	1999–2001	Fox Family (U.S.); Teletoon (Canada)	co-production with CinéGroupe
Xyber 9: New Dawn	1999–2000	Fox Kids/Jetix	co-production with Laurel Way Productions Inc.
NASCAR Racers	1999–2001	Fox Kids	
Spider-Man Unlimited	1999–2001	Fox Kids	co-production with Marvel Studios
Action Man	2000–01	Fox Kids	co-production with Mainframe Entertainment
Pigs Next Door	2000	N/A	co-production with EM.TV and Wavery B.V.
What's with Andy?	2001–02	Fox Family (U.S.); Teletoon (Canada); Fox Kids (international)	season 1 only; co-production with CinéGroupe

==== Live-action series ====
The company also produced and/or distributed the following live action TV series:

Title	Year(s)	Network	Notes
Saban Entertainment
Bio-Man	1986	N/A	unaired pilot
I'm Telling!	1987–88	NBC	co-production with DIC Enterprises
Treasure Mall	1988	Syndication	
2 Hip 4 TV	1988	NBC	
Offshore Television	1988–89	Syndication	co-production with King World R&D Network
Couch Potatoes	1989	Syndication	
Video Power	1990–92	Syndication	co-production with Acclaim Entertainment and Bohbot Entertainment
Scorch	1992	CBS	co-production with Allan Katz Productions and Honeyland Productions for Lorimar Television
Mighty Morphin Power Rangers	1993–95	Fox Kids Network	
Mad Scientist Toon Club	1993–94	Syndication	
VR Troopers	1994–96	Syndication	
Sweet Valley High	1994–97	Syndication/UPN Kids	co-production with Teen Dream Productions
Masked Rider	1995–96	Fox Kids Network/Syndication	
Mighty Morphin Alien Rangers	1996	Fox Kids Network	
Power Rangers Zeo	1996	Fox Kids Network	
Big Bad Beetleborgs	1996–98	Fox Kids	
Power Rangers Turbo	1997	Fox Kids	
Breaker High	1997–98	UPN Kids	co-produced with Shavick Entertainment
Ninja Turtles: The Next Mutation	1997–98	Fox Kids	
The All New Captain Kangaroo	1997–98	Syndication/Fox Family	
Power Rangers in Space	1998	Fox Kids	
Mystic Knights of Tir Na Nog	1998–99	Fox Kids	
The New Addams Family	1998–99	Fox Family	
Power Rangers Lost Galaxy	1999	Fox Kids	
Big Wolf on Campus	1999–2002	Fox Family (U.S.); YTV (Canada)	co-produced with Telescene (seasons 1–2) and CinéGroupe (season 3)
Power Rangers Lightspeed Rescue	2000	Fox Kids	
Power Rangers Time Force	2001	Fox Kids	
Los Luchadores	2001	Fox Kids	co-produced with Shavick Entertainment
BVS Entertainment
Power Rangers Wild Force	2002	Fox Kids/ABC Kids	
Power Rangers Ninja Storm	2003	ABC Kids	
Power Rangers Dino Thunder	2004	ABC Family	
Power Rangers S.P.D.	2005	ABC Family/Toon Disney	
Power Rangers Mystic Force	2006	Toon Disney	
Power Rangers Operation Overdrive	2007	Toon Disney	
Power Rangers Jungle Fury	2008	Toon Disney	
Power Rangers RPM	2009	ABC Kids	
Mighty Morphin Power Rangers (re-version)	2010	ABC Kids	

=== SIP Animation ===
When the company was named Saban International Paris, some of their shows featured the "Saban's" corporate bug in their title although Saban Entertainment itself is not listed. BVS Entertainment was not credited in SIP Animation shows produced after 2002 but BVS International N.V. remained the respective owner of the rights to the SIP Animation name, brand, logo and trademark after 2002.

Title	Year(s)	Network	Notes
Saban International Paris
Saban's Adventures of the Little Mermaid	1991	Fuji Television (Japan); Antenne 2 (France); Syndication (U.S.)	co-production with Hexatel and Fuji Eight Co., Ltd.
Saban's Around the World in Eighty Dreams	1992–93	Canal+/TF1 (France); Amazin' Adventures (U.S.)	
Saban's Gulliver's Travels	1992–93	France 2/Canal+ (France); Amazin' Adventures (U.S.)	
Journey to the Heart of the World	1993–94	Canal+/France 3	co-production with Media Films TV, Dargaud Films and Belvision Studios
Space Strikers	1995–96	M6 (France); SBS (South Korea); UPN Kids (U.S.)	
Iznogoud	1995	Children's BBC (UK); France 2/Canal+ (France); RTL 4 (Netherlands)	co-production with P.I.A. S.A.
Saban's The Why Why Family	1996–97	Fox Kids (international); France 3 (France); Das Erste (Germany); Syndication (U.S.)	
Saban's Adventures of Oliver Twist	1996–97	TF1 (France); Syndication (U.S.)	
Saban's Sissi the Princess	1997–98	Rai Uno (Italy); France 3 (France); Das Erste (Germany); Télévision de Radio-Canada (Canada)	co-production with CinéGroupe and Ventura Film Distributors B.V.
Walter Melon	1997–98	Fox Kids (international); France 2/Canal+ (France); Das Erste (Germany); CITV (UK)	
Diabolik: Track of the Panther	1999–2001	Fox Kids (international); Italia 1 (Italy); M6 (France)	co-production with Astorina, Ashi Productions and Sae-Rom Animation in the participation of CNC
Jim Button	1999–2000	Fox Kids (international); Télévision de Radio-Canada (Canada); TF1 (France); Der Kinderkanal (Germany)	co-production with CinéGroupe, WDR, Ventura Film Distributors B.V., ARD/Degeto and Thomas Haffa/EM.TV & Merchandising AG
Wunschpunsch	2000–01	Télévision de Radio-Canada (Canada); TF1 (France); KI.KA (Germany)	co-production with CinéGroupe and Ventura Film Distributors B.V.
Jason and the Heroes of Mount Olympus	2001–02	Fox Kids (international); TF1 (France)	
SIP Animation
Gadget & the Gadgetinis	2002–03	Fox Kids (international); M6 (France); Five (UK)	co-production for DIC Entertainment
What's with Andy?	2003–04	Fox Kids (international); Teletoon (Canada); Super RTL (Germany)	season 2; co-production with CinéGroupe
The Tofus	2004–05	Jetix (international); France 3 (France); Teletoon (Canada)	co-production with CinéGroupe
W.I.T.C.H.	2004–06	Jetix (U.S.); France 3 (France)	co-production with The Walt Disney Company
A.T.O.M. – Alpha Teens on Machines	2005–07	Jetix	
Combo Niños	2008	Jetix (international); TF1 (France)	

== Films ==
The company also produced and/or distributed the following live action and animated films. Many of Saban Entertainment's television and direct-to video movies targeted older audiences.

=== Saban Entertainment ===
Live-action films

- Alphy's Hollywood Power Party (1987; TV special)
- Rescue Me (1988)
- Who Murdered JFK? (1988; TV special) (co-production with Barbour/Langley Productions)
- Terrorism USA (1989; TV special) (co-production with Barbour/Langley Productions)
- A Perfect Little Murder (1990) (co-production with MollyBen Productions for Gary Hoffman Productions)
- Blind Vision (1991)
- Prey of the Chameleon (1992)
- Round Trip to Heaven (1992)
- Black Ice (1992)
- Revenge on the Highway (1992)
- Anything for Love (1993)
- In the Shadows, Someone's Watching (1993)
- Under Investigation (1993)
- Beyond Suspicion (1994)
- Terminal Voyage (1994)
- Samurai Cowboy (1994)
- Shadow of Obsession (1994)
- Guns of Honor: Rebel Rousers (1994)
- Guns of Honor: Trigger Fast (1994)
- Mighty Morphin Power Rangers: The Movie (1995)
- Behind the Scenes: Tenko and the Guardians of the Magic (1995)
- Virtual Seduction (1995) (co-production with Warner Bros. Television)
- Christmas Reunion (1995)
- Chimp Lips Theater (1997; two TV specials)
- Turbo: A Power Rangers Movie (1997)
- Casper: A Spirited Beginning (1997)
- The Christmas List (1997)
- Gotcha (1998)
- Circles (1998)
- National Lampoon's Men in White (1998)
- Casper Meets Wendy (1998)
- Rusty: A Dog's Tale (1998)
- Addams Family Reunion (1998)
- Earthquake in New York (1998)
- Loyal Opposition: Terror in the White House (1998)
- Richie Rich's Christmas Wish (1998)
- Like Father, Like Santa (1998)
- Men of Means (1999)
- Taken (1999)
- Michael Jordan: An American Hero (1999)
- Dangerous Waters (1999)
- Don't Look Behind You (1999)
- Heaven's Fire (1999)
- Au Pair (1999)
- Ice Angel (2000)
- The Spiral Staircase (2000)
- Au Pair II (2001)
- Oh, Baby! (2001)
- Three Days (2001)

Animated films/specials

- Barbie and the Rockers: Out of this World (1987) (co-production with DIC Entertainment and Mattel)
- Barbie and The Sensations: Rockin' Back to Earth (1987) (co-production with DIC Entertainment and Mattel)
- Dragon Ball Z: The Tree of Might (1997) (TV distributor and musical composer for the original 1997 English dub)
- Digimon: The Movie (2000)

=== Saban/Scherick Productions ===
- The Phantom of the Opera (1990) (co-production with Hexatel, Starcom, TF1, Reteitalia, and Beta Film)
- Spymaker: The Secret Life of Ian Fleming (1990) (co-production for TNT)
- Nightmare in the Daylight (1992) (co-production with Smith/Richmond Productions)
- Till Death Us Do Part (1991)
- Quiet Killer (1992) (co-production with CTV Television Network)

=== Libra Pictures ===
- Blindfold: Acts of Obsession (1994)
- Susie Q (1996) (co-produced by Shavick Entertainment in association with Super RTL and Disney Channel)
- Panic in the Skies! (1996) (co-produced with MTM Enterprises in association with Regent Entertainment, Rosner Television, Shavick Entertainment and International Family Entertainment Inc.)
- Stand Against Fear: A Moment of Truth Movie/Unlikely Suspects (1996) (co-produced with O'Hara-Horowitz Productions)
- Midnight Heat (1996) (co-produced with Shavick Entertainment)
- Justice for Annie: A Moment of Truth Movie (1996) (co-produced with O'Hara-Horowitz Productions)
- Abduction of Innocence: A Moment of Truth Movie (1996) (co-produced with O'Hara-Horowitz Productions)
- Hostile Force (1997) (co-produced by Shavick Entertainment; non-American distribution handled by Saban International)
- Broken Silence: A Moment of Truth Movie/Race Against Fear (1998) (co-produced with O'Hara-Horowitz Productions)
- Random Encounter (1998) (co-produced by Allegro Films; non-Canadian distribution handled by Saban International)
- Someone to Love Me: A Moment of Truth Movie/Race Against Fear (1998) (co-produced with O'Hara-Horowitz Productions)
- Shattered Hearts: A Moment of Truth Movie (1998) (co-produced with O'Hara-Horowitz Productions)

== Back catalogue ==
=== Fox Kids Worldwide ===
These programs were only distributed by Saban Entertainment beginning in 1996, when Saban merged with Fox Children's Network to form Fox Kids Worldwide. Due to this partnership, the New World Animation assets purchased by Fox in 1995 were transferred to Saban Entertainment. After Disney's purchase of Fox Kids Worldwide in 2001, the shows moved to the Buena Vista International Television catalogue. Although Disney held some rights to Marvel-related animated series through BVS Entertainment before Disney acquired Marvel Entertainment, copyrights to shows based on Marvel Comics characters were not directly owned by BVS Entertainment. The remaining rights to these Marvel-branded shows were completely transferred to Marvel Entertainment with Disney's acquisition of Marvel in 2009. Disney gained further rights to the New World Animation/Marvel Productions library following its acquisition of 21st Century Fox in 2019.

In December 1995, Saban International N.V. purchased from Vesical Limited its interest and international rights to certain television programs originally produced by DIC Entertainment. Vesical's assets included non-American rights to series such as Inspector Gadget, Heathcliff and Dennis the Menace. Disney later returned these rights to DIC in 2006.

The rights to Créativité et Développement shows (including the adaptation rights to Diabolik) were transferred to Saban Entertainment as a result of Saban's French subsidiary, Saban International Paris, purchasing C&D in April 1996 and absorbing the company in 1998. C&D retained a few shows produced by DIC Audiovisuel after DIC Enterprises split off from it in 1987.

Marvel Productions/New World Animation

- The Marvel Super Heroes (1966)
  - Iron Man
  - The Sub-Mariner
  - The Incredible Hulk
  - Captain America
  - The Mighty Thor
- Spider-Man (1967–1970)
- The New Fantastic Four (1978)
- Spider-Woman (1979–1980) (also did an alternate theme for the Italian and French dubs in the early 1980s, prior to gaining distribution rights in 1996)
- Spider-Man (1981–1982)
- Spider-Man and His Amazing Friends (1981–1983)
- The Incredible Hulk (1982)
- Dungeons & Dragons (1983–1985)
- Little Wizards (1987–1988)
- RoboCop: The Animated Series (1988) (also involved with the show's music prior to gaining distribution rights in 1996)
- Dino-Riders (1988)
- Rude Dog and the Dweebs (1989)
- X-Men: Pryde of the X-Men (1989)
- Attack of the Killer Tomatoes (1990–1991)
- X-Men (1992–1997) (also involved with the show's production and music prior to gaining distribution rights in 1996)
- Biker Mice from Mars (1993–1996)
- Spider-Man (1994–1998) (also involved with the show's music prior to gaining distribution rights in 1996)
- Iron Man (1994–1996)
- Fantastic Four (1994–1996)
- The Incredible Hulk (1996–1997) (also involved with the show's music during the first season; after gaining distribution rights they became a co-producer during the second season)

Fox Children's Productions

- Bobby's World (1990–1998) (distributed until 2004)
- Peter Pan and the Pirates (1990–1991)
- Piggsburg Pigs! (1990–1991)
- Zazoo U (1990–1991)
- Eek! The Cat / EEK!Stravaganza (1992–1997)
  - The Terrible Thunderlizards (1993–1997)
  - Klutter! (1995–1996)
- Red Planet (1994)
- The Tick (1994–1996)
- Life with Louie (1994–1998)
- Count DeClues' Mystery Castle (1993; TV special)
- Grunt & Punt (1994–1995)
- Goosebumps (1995–1998) (international distributor)

Créativité & Développement

- Botts (1986–1987)
- Amilcar's Window (1987–1989)
- Diplodos (1987–1988)
- Sophie and Virginie (1990–1992)
- Heroes on Hot Wheels (1991–1992)
- The Twins of Destiny (1991–1992)
- Cupido (1991)
- The Adventures of T-Rex (1992–1993)
- Magic Trolls and the Troll Warriors (1992; TV special)
- The Bots Master (1993–1994)
- Happy Ness: Secret of the Loch (1995)

DIC Audiovisuel / DIC Enterprises (pre-1990)

=== Foreign TV series ===
The company also dubbed and/or distributed the following foreign TV series in English.

Title	Year(s)	Network	Notes
My Favorite Fairy Tales	1986	Direct-to-video	Studio Unicorn episodes owned in perpetuity by The Walt Disney Company
Macron 1	1986–87	Syndication	
Maple Town	1987	Syndication/Nickelodeon	North American distribution only; co-production with Tonka and The Maltese Companies
A Christmas Adventure	1987	Syndication	TV special; North American distribution only; co-produced with DIC Entertainment
Grimm's Fairy Tale Classics	1988–89	Nickelodeon	North American and British distribution only; Currently distributed by Discotek Media
The Adventures of Tom Sawyer	1988	HBO	North American distribution only
Tales of Little Women	1988–89	HBO	North American distribution only
Noozles	1988	Nick Jr.	North American distribution only
The Hallo Spencer Show	1989	BBC Two	
Ox Tales	1989	Nine Network	
Wowser	1989	CBN Family Channel	
Maya the Bee	1989–90	Nick Jr.	U.S. distribution only
Bumpety Boo	1989	Family Channel	
Peter Pan: The Animated Series	1990	N/A	
Pinocchio: The Series	1990	HBO	
Dragon Warrior	1990	Syndication	
The Littl' Bits	1990	Nick Jr.	North American distribution only
Funky Fables/Sugar and Spice	1991	Direct-to-video	
Samurai Pizza Cats	1991	Children's ITV	Currently distributed by Discotek Media
Bob in a Bottle	1992	YTV	
Jungle Tales	1992	YTV	
Rock 'n Cop	1992	N/A	
Three Little Ghosts "Afraid of the Dark"	1992	Super Écran	
Tic Tac Toons	1992	Syndication	anthology series consisting of The Wacky World of Tic & Tac and Eggzavier the Eggasaurus
Huckleberry Finn	1993	N/A	
Shuke and Beita	1993	N/A	
Button Nose	1994		North American distribution only
Honeybee Hutch	1995–96	N/A	
Teknoman	1995–96	UPN Kids	
Eagle Riders	1996–97	Syndication	
Dragon Ball Z	1996–98	Syndication	TV distributor and music production for the original English dub of the first two seasons
Super Pig	1997	N/A	
Willow Town	1997	N/A	
Bit the Cupid	1998	N/A	
Bob and Scott	1998	Fox Family	interstitial series; aired as part of Mister Moose's Fun Time
Digimon: Digital Monsters	1999–2003	Fox Kids/UPN	2002–03 episodes renamed by Sensation Animation; Currently distributed by Discotek Media
Hello Kitty's Paradise	2000	Fox Family	
Flint the Time Detective	2000	Fox Family	
Cybersix	2000	Fox Kids	Distributor of the censored Fox Kids cut, which only covered half of the 13 episodes
Dinozaurs	2000	Fox Kids	
Escaflowne	2000	Fox Kids (U.S.); YTV (Canada)	
Mon Colle Knights	2001–02	Fox Kids	
Transformers: Robots in Disguise	2001–02	Fox Kids	
Shinzo	2001	ABC Family	Broadcast in 2002 and 2005; Originally scheduled for Fox Kids
Hatsumei Boy Kanipan	2001	Unfinished	
Slayers	2001	Unfinished	

== Music production only ==
Title	Year(s)	Network	Notes
Ulysses 31	1981–82	FR3; RTL Télé Luxembourg	produced by DIC Audiovisuel and Tokyo Movie Shinsha
The Mysterious Cities of Gold	1982–83	Antenne 2 NHK General TV; RTL Télévision	produced by DIC Audiovisuel, M.K., NHK and CLT-UFA
Inspector Gadget	1983–85	Syndication; FR3	produced by DIC Enterprises, LBS Communications, Nelvana (season 1) & Field Communications (season 1)
The Littles	1983–85	ABC	produced by DIC Enterprises and ABC Entertainment
Saturday Supercade	1983–84	CBS	produced by Ruby-Spears Enterprises
Mister T	1983–85	NBC	produced by Ruby-Spears Enterprises
He-Man and the Masters of the Universe	1983–85	Syndication	produced by Filmation Associates and Mattel
Poochie	1984	Syndication	TV special produced by DIC Enterprises
Heathcliff and the Catillac Cats	1984–85	Syndication; FR3	produced by DIC Enterprises, McNaught Syndicate, LBS Communications, ICC TV Productions (season 1), Chris-Craft Television (season 2) and United Entertainment Group (season 2)
Lucky Luke	1984–85	Syndication; FR3	produced by Gaumont and Hanna-Barbera Productions
The Get Along Gang	1984	CBS	produced by DIC Enterprises and American Greetings
Wolf Rock TV	1984	ABC	produced by DIC Enterprises and Dick Clark Productions
Pole Position	1984	CBS	produced by DIC Enterprises
Going Bananas	1984	NBC	produced by Janson-Menville Productions and Hanna-Barbera Productions
Rainbow Brite	1984–86	Syndication	produced by DIC Enterprises, Hallmark Cards and LBS Communications
She-Ra: Princess of Power	1985–87	Syndication	produced by Filmation Associates and Mattel
It's Punky Brewster	1985–86	NBC	produced by Ruby-Spears Productions and NBC Productions
Jayce and the Wheeled Warriors	1985–86	Syndication	produced by DIC Enterprises and SFM Entertainment
M.A.S.K.	1985–86	Syndication	produced by DIC Enterprises and LBS Communications
Botts	1986–87	TF1	produced by DIC Audiovisuel and SFP
Popples	1986–87	Syndication (Kideo TV)	produced by DIC Enterprises and American Greetings
The Real Ghostbusters	1986–89	ABC/Syndication	seasons 1-5; produced by DIC Enterprises and Columbia Pictures Television/Coca-Cola Telecommunications
Rambo: The Force of Freedom	1986	Syndication	produced by Ruby-Spears Productions and Carolco Pictures
Zoobilee Zoo	1986	Syndication	produced by DIC Enterprises, Hallmark Cards, BRB Productions and SFM Entertainment
Photon	1986–87	Syndication	produced by DIC Enterprises and SFM Entertainment
Dennis the Menace	1986–88	Syndication/CBS	produced by DIC Enterprises, General Mills, and Crawleys Animation (season 2)
Lady Lovely Locks	1987	Syndication (Kideo TV)	produced by DIC Enterprises and American Greetings
Beverly Hills Teens	1987	Syndication	produced by DIC Enterprises
Dinosaucers	1987–88	Syndication	produced by DIC Enterprises and Coca-Cola Telecommunications
Hello Kitty's Furry Tale Theater	1987	CBS	produced by DIC Enterprises, Sanrio, and MGM Television
Starcom: The U.S. Space Force	1987–88	Syndication	produced by DIC Enterprises and Coca-Cola Telecommunications
Sylvanian Families	1987–88	Syndication	produced by DIC Enterprises and Coca-Cola Telecommunications
Diplodo	1988	FR3	produced by Créativité et Développement and Bandai
The New Adventures of Beany and Cecil	1988	ABC	produced by DIC Enterprises, Bob Clampett Productions and Spümcø
Hey Vern, It's Ernest!	1988	CBS	produced by DIC Enterprises and Emshell Producers Group
COPS	1988	Syndication	produced by DIC Enterprises
RoboCop	1988	Syndication	produced by Marvel Productions and Orion Pictures
Ring Raiders	1989	Syndication	produced by DIC Enterprises and Those Characters from Cleveland
The Karate Kid	1989	NBC	produced by DIC Enterprises and Columbia Pictures Television
Maxie's World	1989	Syndication	produced by DIC Enterprises and Claster Television
Attack of the Killer Tomatoes	1990–91	Fox Kids Network	produced by Marvel Productions and Fox Children's Productions
King Arthur and the Knights of Justice	1992–93	Syndication (Amazin' Adventures)	produced by Créativité et Développement, Golden Films, and Bohbot Entertainment
Boyzopolis	1999-2000	Fox Family Channel	produced by Natural 9 Entertainment
Girlzopolis	1999-2000	Fox Family Channel	produced by Natural 9 Entertainment
House of Pop	2000	Fox Family Channel	produced by Riddle-Weinstock Entertainment
Real Scary Stories	2000-2001	Fox Family Channel	produced by Highland Entertainment
Moolah Beach	2001	Fox Family Channel	produced by Big Adventures Productions
State of Grace	2001	Fox Family Channel	first season only; produced by Stan Rogow Productions
Total Access 24/7	2001-2002	Fox Family Channel	produced by Emotional Pictures

== Library status ==
With a few exceptions, the Fox Kids and Saban Entertainment television library is currently owned by The Walt Disney Company through BVS Entertainment. Since SIP Animation has been put into liquidation as of October 2023, BVS Entertainment also owns all remaining assets of Saban International Paris/SIP Animation catalogue and a portion of the Créativité et Développement library acquired by Saban before Disney took over the company.

Disney owns the W.I.T.C.H. IP rights as they were directly involved in the production itself (not just through Jetix Europe) and published the comic books the show was based on. Disney previously licensed A.T.O.M. to independent distributor Multicom Entertainment Group, particularly including digital distribution rights; Multicom's rights have since reverted to Disney. Contrary to popular belief none of the BVS/SIP assets were transferred or folded into The Walt Disney Company France.

Except for some definitive titles (such as Susie Q, Au Pair 1 and 2, and Three Days), it is unknown today how much of the BVS, Libra Pictures and Saban/Scherick films are owned by Disney, due to numerous co-productions or the transfer of certain home video/international distribution rights and/or copyrights to third parties in the years before Disney acquired Saban.

=== Exceptions ===
- The Power Rangers franchise were purchased back by Haim Saban from Disney for $43 million on May 12, 2010. The English rights to the Digimon franchise were also purchased back by Saban on September 25, 2012. The Power Rangers programs are now owned by Hasbro through Hasbro Entertainment, which acquired the assets of Saban Brands in 2018, while Digimon has since retained back by Toei Animation Inc., especially because of bottleneck confusion of Hasbro's license to Takara Tomy's already produced Beyblade products.
- VR Troopers, Masked Rider, Ninja Turtles: The Next Mutation, and Big Bad Beetleborgs are currently fully owned by Hasbro Entertainment after acquiring them from Saban in 2018. For unknown reasons, Mystic Knights of Tir Na Nog remains under the ownership of Disney.
- Canadian rights to Breaker High, The New Addams Family and Ninja Turtles: The Next Mutation are owned by co-producer Shavick Entertainment; the former is available in Canada on Shavick's streaming platform OUT TV. Disney owns the rights to the former two programs outside of Canada, while the latter is owned by Hasbro Entertainment.
- Disney sold Bobby's World to the series' creator Howie Mandel in 2004. Splash Entertainment currently distributes the series under license from him.
- The shows co-produced with Quebec-based CinéGroupe remain in their catalogue, and are distributed by their partner company HG Distribution, including Wunschpunsch, What's with Andy?, Sissi the Princess, The Kids from Room 402, and the live-action series Big Wolf on Campus.
- International rights to Goosebumps reverted to Scholastic Entertainment in the 2010s, with distribution handled by 9 Story Media Group.
- The international distribution rights to the pre-1990 DIC Enterprises library were re-purchased by DIC in March 2006. This library as well as DIC-Saban co-produced The New Archies and DIC-SIP co-produced Gadget & the Gadgetinis via co-producer DIC Entertainment are currently owned by Canadian independent company WildBrain. DIC Audiovisuel's shows (excluding Ulysses 31 and The Mysterious Cities of Gold) remain under the ownership of Disney.
- BVS Entertainment held distribution rights for some AB Productions-C&D co-produced shows for an indefinite period (such as Sophie and Virginie, The Twins of Destiny, Cupido, The Adventures of T-Rex, The Bots Master, and Happy Ness: The Secret of the Loch) but the rights to these shows later reverted to AB Productions and are currently owned by Mediawan Thematics.
- Many of Saban's anime licenses, such as Eagle Riders, Macron 1, Noozles, Flint the Time Detective, The Littl' Bits and Saban's Adventures of Pinocchio, expired in the 2000s.
- Pigs Next Door was a co-production with Fox Kids, EM.TV and Wavery B.V. Studio 100, which acquired EM.TV's children's library in 2008, owns the U.S. digital rights and some international rights to the series (Europe, China, Australia, New Zealand and Quebec).
- NBCUniversal Syndication Studios/Global Distribution currently distributes Kissyfur (through Universal Television) and Casper: A Spirited Beginning (through DreamWorks Animation). For unknown reasons, Casper Meets Wendy remains under the ownership of Disney.
- Saban sold the rights of the live-action film Round Trip to Heaven to Spectrum Entertainment Group in 1992; it is currently distributed by Invincible Entertainment..
- The rights to Dungeons & Dragons are currently fully owned by Hasbro Entertainment, who acquired the series from Disney in the 2020s.
