= Au Pair (film series) =

- Written by: Jeffrey C. Sherman; Cheryl Saban (1–2)
- Directed by: Mark Griffiths
- Starring: Gregory Harrison; Heidi Noelle Lenhart; Jane Sibbett; Katie Volding; Jake Dinwiddie; John Rhys-Davies
- Composers: Inon Zur (1–2); Christopher Brady (3)
- Country of origin: United States
- Original language: English

Production
- Executive producers: Jody Brockway (1, 3); Craig McNeil (1, 3); Jeff Sherman (1, 3); Lance H. Robbins (2); Cheryl Saban (2)
- Producer: Mike Elliott
- Cinematography: Blake T. Evans (1); Thomas L. Callaway (2); Derick Underschultz (3)
- Editors: John Gilbert (1,3); Robert Gordon (2)
- Running time: 282 minutes
- Production companies: Eurofilm Stúdió (1); Saban Entertainment (1–2); Rain Forest Productions (3)

Original release
- Network: Fox Family
- Release: August 22, 1999 – April 22, 2001
- Network: ABC Family
- Release: March 15, 2009

Au Pair is a made-for-television film series directed by Mark Griffiths and released by Saban Entertainment in association with ABC Family.

== Cast and crew ==
Character	Films		
Character	Au Pair	Au Pair II: The Fairytale Continues	Au Pair 3: Adventure in Paradise
Character	1999	2001	2009
Jennifer "Jenny" Morgan	Heidi Lenhart	Heidi Lenhart	Heidi Lenhart
Oliver Caldwell	Gregory Harrison	Gregory Harrison	Gregory Harrison
Katie Caldwell	Katie Volding	Katie Volding	Katie Volding
Alex Caldwell	Jake Dinwiddie	Jake Dinwiddie	Jake Dinwiddie
Sam Morgan	Richard Riehle	Cliff Bemis	
Vivian Berger	Jane Sibbett		
Nigel Kent	John Rhys-Davies		
Charlie Cruikshank	Michael Woolson		
Cassandra Hausen		Rachel York	
Michael Hausen		Robin Dunne	
Grandma Nell Grayson		June Lockhart	
Seamus		James Lancaster	
Brigitte Chabeaux		Celine Massuger	
Karl Hausen		Rory Knox Johnston	
Grimaldi the Paparazzo		Jan Preucil	
Rupert			Gerrit Graham
Walter Hausen			Bradley White
Danny Taylor			Ciaran Tyrrell
