= Au pair (disambiguation) =

An au pair is a person who takes care of children.

Au pair or au pairs can refer to:

- Au Pair (film series)
  - Au Pair (film), a 1999 romantic comedy
- Au Pairs, a music group

== See also ==
- Au Pair Girls, a movie
