= Au Pair 3: Adventure in Paradise =

2009 American comedy film directed by Mark Griffiths

- Written by: Jeffrey C. Sherman
- Directed by: Mark Griffiths
- Starring: Gregory Harrison; Heidi Saban; Katie Volding; Jake Dinwiddie; Kathleen Mealia; Ciaran Tyrrell; Olga Merediz; Bradley White; Gerrit Graham
- Composer: Christopher Brady
- Country of origin: United States
- Original language: English

Production
- Producers: Jody Brockway; Craig McNeil; Jeff Sherman
- Production company: ABC Family Original Productions

Original release
- Network: ABC Family
- Release: March 15, 2009

Au Pair 3: Adventure in Paradise is a 2009 American made-for-television romantic comedy film and is the third and final installment in the Au Pair trilogy and aired on ABC Family on March 15, 2009, and is the only film of the trilogy to be made under the control of Disney.

== Synopsis ==
Eight years have passed since the events of Au Pair, and newly graduated as his high school's valedictorian, Alex Caldwell joins his visiting sister, college freshman Katie and her roommate Ariana on a family summer vacation with father Oliver and stepmother Jenny. Oliver and Jenny's current nanny declines to join them and the over-worked parents/executives must take care of their newborn baby Sarah in Puerto Rico.

Amidst corporate scheming by the young company CFO Walter Hausen, who is planning a takeover of Oliver's company CCI Tekhausen (formed in Au Pair II), Oliver and Jenny must contend with bridging the generation gap with the family, new career motivations and the romances of their 'newly reformed' prankster kids.

== Cast ==
- Gregory Harrison as Oliver Caldwell
- Heidi Saban as Jennifer "Jenny" Caldwell, Oliver's new wife
- Katie Volding as Katie 'Kate' Caldwell, Oliver's daughter
- Jake Dinwiddie as Alexander 'Alex' Caldwell, Oliver's son
- Gerrit Graham as Rupert Kent, the brother of Oliver's now-retired chauffeur Nigel
- Kathleen Mealia as Ariana, Katie's roommate
- Ciaran Tyrrell as Danny Taylor
- Olga Merediz as Teresa
- Bradley White as Walter Hausen
- Brian Tester as Brentfield Academy Headmaster
- Rafa Alvarez as Bodyguard 2

== Series continuity ==
Oliver mentions Walter Hausen's father with great respect (Karl Hausen), but Walter was not present during the events of Au Pair II. Walter may be Brigitte's (Au Pair II) father, but this is never established during this film.

== Production history ==
The first two films in the franchise were made when ABC Family was co-owned by the News Corporation (parent company of 20th Century Fox and the Fox Broadcasting Company) and Haim Saban (founder of Saban Entertainment) as Fox Family.

Au Pair 3 is also the only one without Haim Saban and his wife, Cheryl Saban, who wrote the script for the first two films. However, the other screenwriters remain, as does the director, Mark Griffiths. According to Gregory Harrison's official site, the filming was done in April and May. The synopsis is now available on ABC Family.

Unlike the first two, which took place in Europe, this film takes place in Puerto Rico. The Caldwell's beach house scenes were filmed in Rincón Ocean Villa in Rincón (accessible from Rafael Hernández Airport in Aguadilla) which is about 2 hours away from the Old San Juan, where the film also takes place. Other filming locations in Puerto Rico include the main lobby inside the Puerto Rico Convention Center as well as the exterior building posing as Oliver's company's office in Puerto Rico and El Yunque National Forest's visitor center posing as the laboratories for Oliver's company.

Over 5 million viewers tuned in for the premiere of Au Pair 3: Adventure in Paradise.

== Home media ==
Gaiam released the movie to DVD in the United States on December 29, 2009, under license from Walt Disney Studios Home Entertainment.
