= Gregory Harrison =

American actor (born 1950)

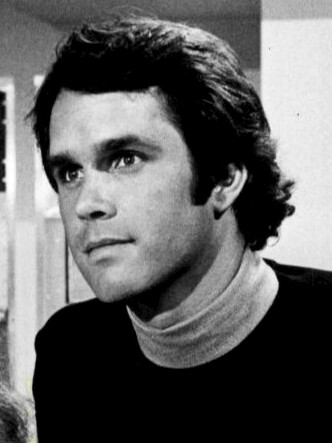
- Harrison in Logan's Run, 1977
- Born: Gregory Neale Harrison; May 31, 1950 (age 76); Avalon, California, United States
- Occupations: Actor; producer
- Years active: 1973–present
- Spouse: Randi Oakes (m. 1980)
- Children: 4
- Relatives: Chloë Grace Moretz (daughter-in-law)

Gregory Neale Harrison (born May 31, 1950) is an American actor. He is known primarily for his roles as Dr. George Alonzo "Gonzo" Gates, the young surgeon assistant of Dr. Trapper John McIntyre (played by Pernell Roberts) on the CBS series Trapper John, M.D. (1979–86), and as ruthless business tycoon Michael Sharpe in the CBS series Falcon Crest (1989–1990). Since 2015, Harrison has played Joe O'Toole, father of Oliver, in the Hallmark Channel expansion films of Signed, Sealed and Delivered. From 2020 to 2024, he assumed the role of Gregory Chase on General Hospital.

== Early life ==
Harrison was born in Avalon, California, on May 31, 1950. He was the middle child of Ed Harrison, a ship's captain and poet, and Donna Lee Nagely, an aspiring dancer; they eventually divorced. Harrison has an older sister, Kathleen (born 1948), and a younger brother, Christopher (born 1961). He served for two years in the United States Army during the Vietnam War era as a medic.

== Career ==
Harrison portrayed the title character in the science fiction series Logan's Run (1977–78), after which he played Levi Zendt in the NBC miniseries Centennial (1978), based on James Michener's epic novel of the same name, which was first televised on NBC from October 1978 to February 1979.

Harrison appeared on an episode of M*A*S*H before garnering fame in 1979 with the role of surgeon Dr. George "Gonzo" Gates on Trapper John, M.D., starring opposite Pernell Roberts. The medical drama was spun off from M*A*S*H. Harrison remained as Gonzo on Trapper John until the middle of the show's seventh season, when he decided to leave for other ventures. The series continued for several more episodes without Harrison, but concluded its run at the end of the 1985–86 season.

Harrison's later role as stripper John Phillips in the 1981 TV movie For Ladies Only made him a favorite with women and gay men in the 1980s. Harrison spoofed that role in the 1986 miniseries Fresno, where his character appeared shirtless at every opportunity. Fresno was also a spoof of the prime-time series Falcon Crest, where Harrison became a regular three years later in the final season (1989–90). As Falcon Crest ended production in early 1990, the series' parent studio, Lorimar Television, cast Harrison in its upcoming CBS sitcom The Family Man, from producers Thomas L. Miller and Robert L. Boyett. The series, which premiered that fall, featured Harrison as a single fireman father raising his four children with the help of his father-in-law, played by Al Molinaro. Despite a few attempts by CBS to help it build an audience, The Family Man was cancelled after one season.

Harrison later joined the cast of NBC's Sisters for the 1994–95 season, playing Daniel Albright. In 1996, he starred with Eric Roberts in It's My Party, a film based on the true story of a man in the end stages of AIDS who planned a party to say goodbye to friends and family.

From 1999 to 2009, Harrison played the male lead role of Oliver Caldwell in each film of the Au Pair trilogy. In 1999, Harrison starred as Sheriff Jon Loring in the WB Network's short-lived family drama Safe Harbor and had recurring roles in series such as One Tree Hill, Ringer, Rizzoli & Isles, and Chesapeake Shores. In 2011, he had a guest-starring role as a doctor on ABC's Body of Proof, and he has made guest appearances on many other shows such as Touched by an Angel, Judging Amy, Reunion, Joey, Law & Order: Special Victims Unit, Drop Dead Diva and Hot in Cleveland. In 2020, Harrison joined the cast of General Hospital, and played the role of Gregory Chase until he left the ABC soap opera in 2024. Since 2021, Harrison has appeared in the recurring role of Phillip Buckley, father of main characters Evan "Buck" Buckley and Maddie Buckley, in 9-1-1.

On stage, Harrison played Billy Flynn in the touring and Broadway productions of Chicago, and also appeared as Benjamin Stone in the Broadway revival of Stephen Sondheim's Follies and starred in the original Broadway production of Kander & Ebb's musical Steel Pier.

== Personal life ==
Harrison has been married since December 21, 1980 to actress Randi Oakes, whom he met while competing on a 1979 edition of Battle of the Network Stars, with Harrison on the CBS team and Oakes on the NBC team. Their marriage was kept secret from the public for several years. The couple have four children: daughters Emma Lee (born 1985), Lily Anne (born 1989), and Kate (born 1991); and adopted son Quinn Edgar. Since 2025, youngest daughter Kate, a model, has been married to actress Chloe Grace Moretz. Lily is engaged to and shares a son with actor Peter Facinelli. The couple originally lived together in Sherman Oaks, California, but since the early 1990s, they have lived in Southern Oregon; first in Gold Beach for 15 years, then Eugene.

Harrison became addicted to cocaine during the 1980s, and he broke the addiction with the help of the Betty Ford Center.

== Filmography ==
Film
Year	Title	Role	Notes
1973	The Harrad Experiment	Student	
1976	Jim the World's Greatest	Jim Nolan	
1977	Fraternity Row	Zac Sterling	
1984	Razorback	Carl Winters	
1987	North Shore	Chandler	
1992	Body Chemistry II: The Voice of a Stranger	Dan	
1993	Cadillac Girls	Sam	
1995	Hard Evidence	Trent Turner	
1996	It's My Party	Brandon Theis	
1998	Air Bud: Golden Receiver	Dr. Patrick Sullivan	Alternative title: Air Bud 2
2000	Canone Inverso - Making Love	Jeno Piccolo	Alternative title: The Inverse Canon
2009	Love N' Dancing	Uncle Carl	
2009	Give 'Em Hell, Malone	Whitmore	
2014	The M Word	Mack Riley	
2016	Fair Haven	Dr. Gallagher	
2020	The Vanished	Dr. Bradley	Alternative title: Hour of Lead
Television films
Year	Title	Role	Notes
1975	Trilogy of Terror	Arthur Moore	Segment: "Julie"
1977	The Gathering	Bud Jr.	
1979	The Best Place to Be	Rick Jawlosky	
1980	The Women's Room	Ben Volper	
1980	Enola Gay: The Men, the Mission, the Atomic Bomb	Captain Bob Lewis	
1981	For Ladies Only	John Phillips	
1983	The Fighter	Merle Banks	
1983	The Hasty Heart	Sgt. Lachlen McLachlen	
1985	Seduced	Mike Riordan	
1986	Oceans of Fire	Ben Laforche	
1986	Picnic	Hal Carter	
1988	Hot Paint	Willie	
1988	Red River	Cherry Valance	Co-Producer
1990	Dangerous Pursuit	Political Assassin	
1990	Angel of Death	Gary Nicholson	
1991	Bare Essentials	William "Bill" Buzell	
1992	Breaking the Silence	Paul Danner	
1992	Duplicates	Bob Boxletter	
1992	Split Images	Robbie Daniels	
1993	Caught in the Act	Scott McNally	
1993	A Family Torn Apart	Tom Kelley	Alternative title: Sudden Fury
1994	Lies of the Heart: The Story of Laurie Kellogg	Bruce Kellogg	
1994	Mortal Fear	Philip Montgomery	
1994	A Christmas Romance	Brian Harding	
1995	A Dangerous Affair	Robert Kenzer	
1995	Nothing Lasts Forever	Dr. Benjamin "Ben" Wallace	
1996	Summer of Fear	Lucas Marshall	
1997	When Secrets Kill	Greg Newhall	
1998	Running Wild	Matt Robinson	
1998	Murder at 75 Birch	Rick Todson	
1999	First Daughter	President Jonathan Hayes	
1999	Au Pair	Oliver Caldwell	
2000	First Target	President Jonathan Hayes	
2001	Au Pair II	Oliver Caldwell	
2002	First Shot	President Jonathan Hayes	
2002	St. Sass	Adam Patrick	
2009	Au Pair 3: Adventure in Paradise	Oliver Caldwell	
2012	Undercover Bridesmaid	Mr. Thompson	
2013	After All These Years	David Larabee	
2014	The Nine Lives of Christmas	Chief Sam	
2015	Cloudy with a Chance of Love	Grant	
2015	Signed, Sealed, Delivered: Truth Be Told	Joe O'Toole	
2016	Signed, Sealed, Delivered: One in a Million	Joe O'Toole	
2016	Signed, Sealed, Delivered: Lost Without You	Joe O'Toole	
2016	My Christmas Love	Tom Manning	
2017	Signed, Sealed, Delivered: Higher Ground	Joe O'Toole	
2017	Signed, Sealed, Delivered: Home Again	Joe O'Toole	
2018	Signed, Sealed, Delivered: To the Altar	Joe O'Toole	
2019	Love, Fall & Order	Hank Hart	
2021	Sweet Carolina	Pete Wilder	
2021	The Nine Kittens of Christmas	Chief Sam	Sequel to The Nine Lives of Christmas
Television series
Year	Title	Role	Notes
1976	Barnaby Jones	Ritchie Ridder	Episode: "Blood Vengeance"
1976	M*A*S*H	Lt. Tony Baker	Episode: "The Nurses"
1977–1978	Logan's Run	Logan 5	Main role
1978–1979	Centennial	Levi Zendt	Miniseries
1979–1986	Trapper John, M.D.	Dr. George Alonzo "Gonzo" Gates	Main role (seasons 1–7)
1986	Fresno	Torch	Miniseries
1987	The Greatest Adventure: Stories from the Bible	Joseph	Voice role; episode: "The Nativity"
1989–1990	Falcon Crest	Michael Sharpe	Main role
1990–1991	The Family Man	Jack Taylor	Main role
1995	500 Nations	Narrator	Voice role; 8 episodes
1995	Sisters	Daniel Albright	Recurring role (5 episodes)
1995	Touched by an Angel	Pete Taylor	Episode: "There But for the Grace of God"
1995	New York News	Jack Reilly	Main role
1996–1997	Dark Skies	Old John Loengard	Uncredited voice role; 20 episodes
1998	Touched by an Angel	Richard	Episode: "Flights of Angels"
1998	The Outer Limits	Dr. Larry Chambers	Episode: "To Tell the Truth"
1998	Dead Man's Gun	Boucher / Trapper	Episode: "The Trapper"
1998	Maggie Winters	Mr. Wiehe	Episode: "And Those Who Can't"
1999	Safe Harbor	Sheriff John Loring	Main role
2000	Ed	Nick Stanton	Recurring role (5 episodes)
2000–2001	Judging Amy	Tom Gillette	Recurring role (4 episodes)
2002	Touched by an Angel	Don	Episode: "Forever Young"
2002–2003	Strong Medicine	Dr. Randolf Kilner	Recurring role (4 episodes)
2003	Miracles	Sheriff Ed Prescott	Episode: "The Bone Scatterer"
2005–2006	Reunion	Russell Brewster	Recurring role (7 episodes)
2005–2006	Joey	Dean	Recurring role (5 episodes)
2006	Law & Order: Special Victims Unit	Nathan Speer	Episode: "Clock"
2008	Rodney	Duke Lewis	Episode: "Potty Mouth"
2009	Drop Dead Diva	Brandon Tharpe	Episode: "Crazy"
2009	Maneater	Teddy Alpert	Miniseries
2009–2011	One Tree Hill	Paul Norris	Recurring role (11 episodes)
2010	CSI: NY	Roland Carson	Episode: "Out of the Sky"
2011	Hot in Cleveland	Dave	Episode: "Elka's Snowbird"
2011	Body of Proof	Dr. Cameron Fischer	Episode: "Gross Anatomy"
2012	Outside the Box	Thorn	Episode: "Soylent Green"
2012	Ringer	Tim Arbogast	Recurring role (5 episodes)
2013	Psych	Ted Lomax	Episode: "Nip and Suck It"
2014	Reckless	Decatur "Dec" Fortnum	Main role
2015	Castle	Danny Valentine	Episode: "Dead from New York"
2015	NCIS	Navy Capt. Roland Ebbakey	Episode: "Viral"
2015–2016	Rizzoli & Isles	Ron Hanson	Recurring role (6 episodes)
2017–2022	Chesapeake Shores	Thomas O'Brien	Recurring role (16 episodes)
2017	The Middle	Bennett Brooks	Episode: "Meet the Parents"
2018–2019	American Housewife	Dan	2 episodes
2020–2024	General Hospital	Gregory Chase	Series regular
2021–present	9-1-1	Phillip Buckley	7 episodes
