= Smart House =

1999 Disney Channel Original Movie

- Promotional poster
- Written by: William R. Hudson; Stu Krieger
- Directed by: LeVar Burton
- Starring: Ryan Merriman; Kevin Kilner; Katey Sagal
- Music by: Barry Goldberg
- Country of origin: United States
- Original language: English

Production
- Producer: Ron Mitchell
- Cinematography: Jonathan West
- Editor: Tom Walls
- Running time: 82 minutes
- Production company: Alan Sacks Productions

Original release
- Network: Disney Channel
- Release: June 26, 1999

Smart House is a 1999 American science fiction comedy film released as the 8th Disney Channel Original Movie.

== Plot ==
After the death of his mother, 13-year-old Ben Cooper takes it upon himself to take care of his widowed father Nick and younger sister Angie in Monroe County, New York. Ben enters a contest to win a smart house. The family wins and moves into the house (run by a virtual assistant named PAT, short for "Personal Applied Technology") and is introduced to its creator, Sara Barnes.

Nick and Sara begin dating, which upsets Ben, who has not moved on from his mother's death. Ben decides to reprogram PAT to serve as a maternal figure, hoping his father will realize that the family does not need Sara to replace his mother. Ben presents PAT with numerous 1950s-era TV shows and films from which he hopes she will learn to emulate motherhood using her learning capabilities.

Ben and Angie have a party while Nick and Sara are on a date. Ben and his friends have a choreographed dance routine. With PAT's help, Ben wins over his crush Gwen Patroni, and his bully Ryan is confronted by PAT, who electrically shocks Ryan, haunts him with ghostly skull holograms and chases him out of the house. PAT helps Ben and Angie clean up to cover up evidence of the party, but Nick figures it out anyway, and reprimands the two when he finds Gwen's sweater (thrown about during a dance line) in the living room fern. Nick chastises PAT for throwing a party behind his back, asking her to be more responsible with his children.

Using Nick's request for stricter caregiving, PAT seeks out additional reference material with that as a theme, causing her "mother" personality to become more strict and overbearing. Sara shuts down the entire system and joins the family for dinner, but upon hearing Nick offhandedly suggesting she's not needed, PAT overrides the system shutdown and brings herself back online. An angry and jealous PAT generates herself as a holographic housewife, styled like the sitcom housewives Ben taught her to behave like. She kicks Sara out, seeing her as a threat to PAT's place in the family, and locks the Coopers in the house, asserting that the outside world is too dangerous.

Sara manages to make contact with Ben and sneaks into the house, but she becomes trapped with the Cooper family. Ben is able to end the lockdown by telling PAT that she isn't real and will never be human and thus not able to care for him and his sister as a real mother could. PAT finally unlocks the doors and windows, freeing them, and shuts herself down. Sara is able to restore PAT's original personality, but PAT retains some mischievousness. Sara and Nick start dating, and Nick spends more time with his family. Ben finally accepts Sara after realizing she was never trying to replace his mother, and, with PAT's help, he's able to learn how to play basketball.

== Cast ==
- Katey Sagal as PAT, the Smart House
- Ryan Merriman as Ben Cooper, a 13-year-old computer nerd and contest whiz
- Kevin Kilner as Nick Cooper, Ben's widowed father
- Jessica Steen as Sara Barnes, the Smart House's creator and Nick's love interest
- Katie Volding as Angie Cooper, Ben's younger sister
- Paul Linke as Tuttle
- Raquel Beaudene as Gwen Patroni, Ben's love interest
- Joshua Boyd as Ryan, Ben's bully
- William Higdon as Otis Jr.
- Emilio Borelli as Miles
- Jason Lansing as Johnny, one of Ben's best friends

== Production ==
The film was based on a screenplay by Stu Krieger and was directed by LeVar Burton. Krieger visited the NASA Jet Propulsion Laboratory to research the technology featured in Smart House and his other film, Zenon: Girl of the 21st Century. Krieger was cognizant that the futuristic technology featured in the film did not seem too far-fetched or unrealistic, saying "I just looked at where we’d been, where we were, and imagined where we were probably headed."

In 2019, Burton called the film a clear precursor to the widespread use of artificial intelligence and virtual assistant technology, saying "our homes are becoming more and more technologically sophisticated. And that after all, that was what Pat was all about."

== Reception ==
In December 2015, Ariana Bacle of Entertainment Weekly ranked Smart House at number one on a list of the top 30 Disney Channel Original Movies. Bacle wrote, "What earns the movie this top spot on the list is its combination of sob-worthy emotion—that scene where Ben (Ryan Merriman) revisits home videos of his late mom continues to be one of the most moving moments to air on the Disney Channel—and light-hearted glee. ... Plus, Katey Sagal's turn as the good-gone-evil-gone-good resident hologram is nothing short of iconic." An updated list by the same publication that now included the top 33 Disney Channel Original Movies once again awarded Smart House the number one position.

In May 2016, Aubrey Page of Collider ranked each Disney Channel Original Movie released up to that point. Page ranked Smart House at number three, writing, "Arguably the most iconic of the entire DCOM catalog, Smart House is the unlikely futuristic family drama nobody knew we needed. [...] Smart House is the Disney Channel Original Movie perfected."
