= Jason and the Heroes of Mount Olympus =

Television series

- Genre: animation
- Voices of: Miles Marsico; S. Scott Bullock; Tifanie Christun; Tom Bosley; Pat Fraley; Daran Norris
- Country of origin: France
- No. of seasons: 1
- No. of episodes: 26

Production
- Production company: Saban International Paris

Original release
- Network: TF1 (France); Fox Kids (Europe)
- Release: 2001 – 2002

Jason and the Heroes of Mount Olympus (French: Jason et les héros de l'Olympe, lit. Jason and the Heroes of Olympia) is an animated TV series produced by Saban International Paris in co-production with Fox Kids Europe and TF1. The series stars the voices of Miles Marsico, Pat Fraley, John Morris, Tifanie Christun, Scott Bullock, Frank Welker and Tom Bosley.

Ownership of the series passed to Disney in 2001 when Disney acquired Fox Kids Worldwide, which also includes Saban Entertainment.

== Series overview ==
Jason is a twelve-year-old with dreams of becoming a hero just like those in the mythological battles of the Ancient World. His aspirations become a reality when he climbs to the top of Mount Olympus and fulfills an ancient prophecy, turning Jason into the “chosen one”. Jupiter, King of the Immortals, gives him the Belt of Orion which allows him to reside on Mount Olympus and gives him control of the universe. When the evil Dracchus seeks to claim the all-powerful amulet, Jason has to protect the belt and save Mount Olympus.

== Characters ==
- Jason (voiced by Miles Marsico)
- Mercury (voiced by S. Scott Bullock)
- Venus (voiced by Tifanie Christun)
- Jupiter (voiced by Tom Bosley)
- Mars
- Hercules (voiced by Pat Fraley)

=== Villains ===
- Dracchus (voiced by Daran Norris)

== Episode Guide ==
1. Orion's Belt: Jason, to prove that he is the Chosen One, must work with Mercury to pick one of the golden apples that are guarded by Ladon in the Garden of Hesperides.
2. Meeting With Medusa: Dracchus hires Medusa to help him instigate a war between the Greeks and the Trojans.
3. Jason and the Harpies: A spurned warlock turns all of the women in his village into harpies using a spell provided by Dracchus.
4. Sea No Evil: A kraken is terrorizing merfolk, who help Jason and Mercury deliver vital medicine to Hippocrates.
5. Jason and the Sirens: The aging queen of the sirens attempts to restore her youth by stealing the Emerald of Eternity.
6. No Man's Land: A storm strands Jason and Mercury in an Amazon village, where their presence invokes a curse that brings forth a monster called Zarkoz.
7. Forge of Vulcan: Venus is captured and put to work beautifying a forge operated by Talos and Vulcan. When Jason and Mercury come to rescue her, Vulcan orders that Orion's belt be smelted into a crown for Venus.
8. Treasure of Trouble: Mercury's good side is magically sucked out by Princess Anathema.
9. The Last of the Atlanteans: Pirates steal Orion's belt to fund a search for the treasure of Atlantis.
10. Unity is Strength: Dracchus has the Lernaean Hydra force an oracle to lure Jason, Mercury, and Venus into a trap in Delphi.
11. Changer in Our Midst: A captive woman who Jason and Mercury free turns out to be a gold-crazed shapeshifter who steals Orion's belt before usurping King Midas.
12. Sting of the Scorpion: Jason and Mercury end up in Babylon, where Jupiter's steed, Pegasus, is taken by one of the sons of Nebuchadnezzar II.
13. Lost in the Labyrinth: A misunderstanding prompts King Minos to condemn Hercules and Venus to the labyrinth, where the two are hunted by the Minotaur.
14. Indiscipline: Dracchus uncovers and unleashes the Titans, who he sics on Sparta.
15. Horseplay on Mt. Olympus: Jupiter, in a fit of anger, snaps at Mercury, which leads to Mercury being falsely befriended by a centaur minion of Dracchus. The centaur tricks Mercury into giving Jupiter a cursed tunic which causes Jupiter to lose his mind and weaken the defenses of Mt. Olympus.
16. Danger in a Strange Land: Jason, Mercury, and Venus lose Orion's belt in Hades, where they run afoul of Argus, Cerberus, Charon, and Echidna, and Mercury loses his memory in the river Lethe.
17. Sleepless on Mt. Olympus: Dracchus steals a staff that allows him to control the dreams of the Olympians.
18. The Cyclops: A roc forcibly adopts Jason and Mercury after the two save one of her eggs from the Cyclopes.
19. Fast Feud: Jason, Mercury, and Venus get caught up in a war between two tribes of sorcerers after being ambushed by Dracchus.
20. Laughter of the Sphinx: A riddling sphinx, depressed over her missing dragon husband, decides to keep Mercury after he makes her laugh, while Jason is hunted by dragons (including the sphinx's husband) who have been brainwashed by Dracchus.
21. Close Companion: Jason, Mercury, and Venus need the help of an obnoxious, rhyming guide to recharge Jupiter's Fountain of Fate.
22. The Pipes of Pan: Jason and Mercury are stuck babysitting Pan's young nieces when Dracchus's harpies attack Mt. Olympus.
23. Calypso's Challenge: Calypso, enraged over Jason beating her champion swimmer, traps him, Mercury, and Venus on her island after Jason refuses to represent her at the Panathenaic Games.
24. The Golden Fleece: King Aeëtes tricks Jason, Mars, Mercury, and Venus into stealing the Golden Fleece.
25. Gaze of Gorgons: Medusa returns, and takes over Thessaly with the help of her sisters, Euryale and Stheno.
26. Day of Destiny: A year after Jason first received Orion's belt, he begins training with Orion as Dracchus assembles a massive army of monsters to conquer Mt. Olympus. Jason and Mercury's threads of destiny are accidentally mixed-up by the Fates, causing Jason and Mercury to switch personalities and placing all of Greece in jeopardy as Dracchus lays siege to Mt. Olympus.

== Airing ==
In Canada, the series aired on Family Channel.

== See also ==
- Saint Seiya
- Hercules (1997 film)
- MÄR
