= Thomas Byles =

English Catholic priest (1870–1912)

Servant of God The Reverend Thomas Byles
- Rector of St Helen's Parish, Chipping Ongar
- Byles c. 1900s
- Church: Roman Catholic Church
- In office: 1905 – 1912

Orders
- Ordination: 1902

Personal details
- Born: Roussel Davids Byles; 26 February 1870 Leeds, West Yorkshire, England
- Died: 15 April 1912 (aged 42) North Atlantic Ocean
- Denomination: Roman Catholicism (previously Anglicanism; born Congregationalist)
- Education: Leamington College for Boys; Rossall School
- Alma mater: Balliol College, Oxford (B.A.); Pontifical Gregorian University (B.D.)

Thomas Roussel Davids Byles (born Roussel Davids Byles, 26 February 1870 – 15 April 1912) was an English Catholic priest who was a passenger aboard the RMS Titanic on its maiden voyage when it sank after striking an iceberg during the night of 14–15 April 1912. He was reported as being amidst the throng of trapped passengers on the ship's rear deck in its final moments of descent, audibly praying.

== Life ==
Thomas Byles was born in Leeds, Yorkshire, the eldest of seven children of Alfred Holden Byles, a Congregationalist minister, and his wife Louisa Davids. His uncle was William Byles, a newspaper owner and Liberal politician. He attended Leamington College for Boys and Rossall School, Fleetwood, Lancashire, between 1885 and 1889, then went to Balliol College, Oxford, in 1889 to study theology, graduating with a Bachelor of Arts degree in 1894. While at Oxford, Byles converted to the Church of England and later, like his younger brother William had done before, to the Roman Catholic faith, taking the name Thomas. In 1899, he went to the Pontifical Gregorian University in Rome to study for the priesthood and was ordained in 1902. He was assigned to St Helen's Parish in Chipping Ongar, Essex in 1905, where he would remain until his death.

An invitation to officiate at the wedding of his younger brother William prompted Byles to make the trip to New York City. He said Mass on 14 April, the morning of the sinking and the Second Sunday of Easter, for both second-and third-class passengers in their respective lounges. The sermon described the need for prayer and the sacraments as a "spiritual lifeboat" to avoid a metaphorical shipwreck in times of temptation.

Byles was walking on the upper deck praying his breviary when the Titanic struck the iceberg. As the ship was sinking, he assisted many third-class passengers up to the boat deck to the lifeboats. He reportedly twice refused a place on a lifeboat. Toward the end he recited the Rosary and other prayers, heard confessions and gave absolution to more than a hundred passengers who remained trapped on the stern of the ship after all of the lifeboats had been launched. His body, if recovered, was never identified. His brothers installed a door in his memory at St Helen's Catholic Church in Chipping Ongar, Essex. Pope Pius X later described Byles as a "martyr for the Church".

== Beatification process ==
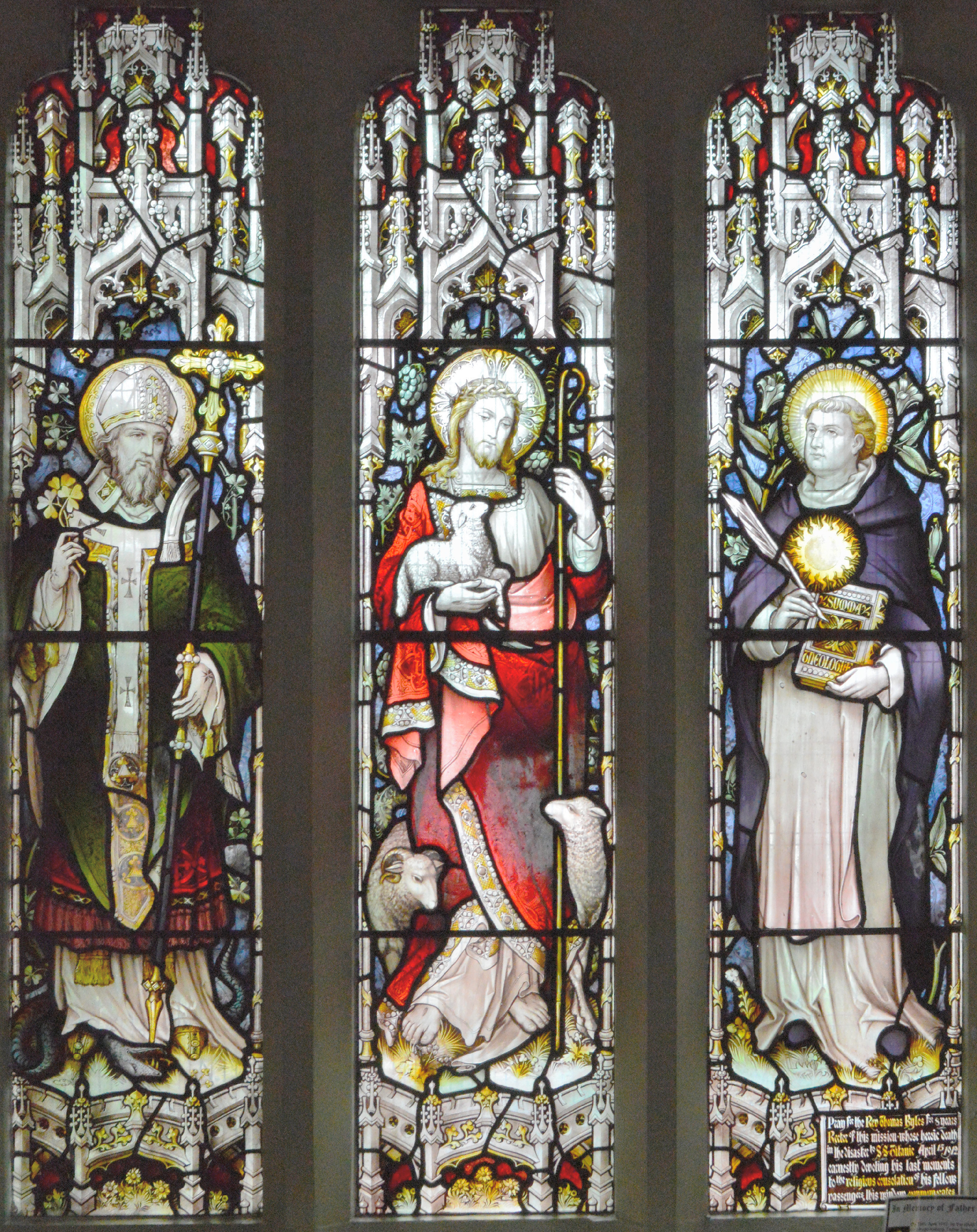
Stained glass window dedicated to Thomas Byles in St Helen's Catholic Church, Chipping Ongar, Essex

In April 2015, Graham Smith, the current priest of St Helen's Church, with support of Bishop Alan Williams of the Diocese of Brentwood, initiated the first steps towards the beatification process.

== In popular culture ==
Byles has three times been portrayed in films about the disaster. In the 1979 television movie S.O.S. Titanic, he was portrayed by Matthew Guinness. In the 1997 film, Titanic, he was portrayed (inaccurately as an Irishman) by James Lancaster, reciting the Rosary and verses from the Book of Revelation. Richard Basehart plays a thinly disguised Byles in the 1953 film. His story is featured in a book written by Cady Crosby entitled A Titanic Hero: Thomas Byles. The book documents Byles' early life, his years in ministry and his final hours on board the RMS Titanic.
