= Mark Griffiths (film director) =

Film director

- Known for: Going the Distance

Mark Griffiths is a Canadian screenwriter and film director. Griffith is married to Louise Baker.

== Filmography ==
- Perpetual Motion Machine (1973) (short)
- And I Don't Mean Maybe (1984) (short)
- Hardbodies (1984)
- Running Hot (1984)
- Hardbodies 2 (1986)
- Heroes Stand Alone (1989)
- A Cry in the Wild (1990)
- Ultraviolet (1992)
- Cheyenne Warrior (1994)
- Max Is Missing (1995)
- Behind Enemy Lines (1997)
- Tactical Assault (1998)
- The Cowboy and the Movie Star (1998)
- Au Pair (1999)
- Au Pair II (2001)
- The Miracle of the Cards (2001)
- Beethoven's 5th (2003)
- Going the Distance (2004)
- Jane Doe: The Wrong Face (2005)
- Mystery Woman: Mystery Weekend (2005)
- What I Did for Love (2006)
- McBride: Requiem (2006)
- Our House (2006)
- Safe Harbor (2006)
- Love's Unending Legacy (2007)
- Au Pair 3: Adventure in Paradise (2009)
- Growing the Big One (2010)
- How to Fall in Love (2012)
- Nearlyweds (2013)
- June in January (2014)
- A Novel Romance (2015)
- The Unauthorized Melrose Place Story (2015)
