= Fame L.A. =

American television series

- Created by: Richard Barton Lewis
- Starring: Heidi Lenhart; Christian Kane; William R. Moses; Lesli Margherita; Roselyn Sánchez; Matt Winston; Andy Milder; T.E. Russell
- Country of origin: United States
- No. of seasons: 1
- No. of episodes: 22

Production
- Production companies: Trilogy Entertainment Group; MGM Television

Original release
- Network: Syndication
- Release: October 4, 1997 – March 21, 1998

Fame L.A. is an American drama series that aired in syndication from October 4, 1997 to March 21, 1998. It tells the story of a drama/dance school in Los Angeles where students hone their talents while overcoming various personal problems. It stars Heidi Lenhart, Christian Kane, Roselyn Sánchez, William R. Moses, and Lesli Margherita, among others. Its producers included Patricia Green. Among its directors were Sharron Miller and Nancy Malone. A total of 22 sixty-minute episodes were produced. RTÉ, Ireland's national public service broadcaster, is currently airing their own version of the show, titled, Fame: The Musical.

== Cast ==
- Heidi Lenhart as Suzanne Carson
- Christian Kane as Ryan Legget
- William R. Moses as David Graysmark
- Lesli Margherita as Liz Clark
- Roselyn Sánchez as Lili Arguelo
- Matt Winston as Adom Lewis
- Andy Milder as Marcus Carilli
- T.E. Russell as T.J. Baron

== Episodes ==
No.	Title	Directed by	Written by	Original release date
1	"Pilot: Part 1"	Unknown	Unknown	October 4, 1997
2	"Pilot: Part 2"	Unknown	Unknown	October 11, 1997
3	"Pilot: Part 3"	Unknown	Unknown	October 18, 1997
4	"Almost a Big Night"	Unknown	Unknown	October 25, 1997
5	"Seize the Day"	Unknown	Unknown	November 1, 1997
6	"The Beat Goes On"	Unknown	Unknown	November 8, 1997
7	"Reality Check"	Unknown	Unknown	November 15, 1997
8	"Life Through the Lens"	Unknown	Unknown	November 22, 1997
9	"Who Do You Love?"	Unknown	Unknown	November 29, 1997
10	"The Guru"	Unknown	Unknown	December 6, 1997
11	"The Christmas Episode"	Unknown	Unknown	December 13, 1997
12	"Love Hurts"	Unknown	Unknown	January 10, 1998
13	"Haunting Refrains"	Unknown	Unknown	January 17, 1998
14	"Baby Pictures"	Unknown	Unknown	January 24, 1998
15	"Duet"	Unknown	Unknown	January 31, 1998
16	"The Key to Success"	Unknown	Unknown	February 7, 1998
17	"Music Lessons"	Unknown	Unknown	February 14, 1998
18	"The Boys and the Band"	Unknown	Unknown	February 21, 1998
19	"Lili Vanilli"	Unknown	Unknown	February 28, 1998
20	"Do or Die"	Unknown	Unknown	March 7, 1998
21	"Green Eyed Monster"	Unknown	Unknown	March 14, 1998
22	"Brotherly Love"	Unknown	Jordan Budde	March 21, 1998

== Awards ==
The series won two Primetime Emmys, for Outstanding Choreography (Marguerite Pomerhn Derricks and Peggy Holmes for the pilot) and Outstanding Main Title Theme Music (Maribeth Derry, Tom Snow, Robbie Buchanan and series creator Richard Barton Lewis).
