= Tifanie Christun =

American voice actress (born 1972)

- Born: Tifany Kristen Lenhart; February 27, 1972 (age 54); Los Angeles, California, U.S.
- Occupation: Voice actor
- Years active: 1987–2008
- Spouse: Chris Chaney
- Mother: Cheryl Saban
- Family: Heidi Lenhart Stills (sister); Haim Saban (stepfather)

Tifanie Christun (born February 27, 1972) is an American former voice actress. She is the daughter of Ray Lenhart and Cheryl Saban, the stepdaughter of Haim Saban, and the sister of Heidi Lenhart. She is also known as Tifany Lenhart and Tiffany Christun. She is married to musician Chris Chaney.

== Filmography ==
=== Television ===
- A Christmas Adventure - Bridget
- Digimon Adventure - Biyomon, Yokomon
- Digimon Adventure 02 - Yolei Inoue, Biyomon
- Digimon Tamers - Riley Otori
- Digimon Frontier - Minomon (5), Biyomon (44), Chiaki
- Flint the Time Detective - Sarah Goodman, Plumella
- Horseland - Pepper
- Jason and the Heroes of Mount Olympus - Venus
- Mon Colle Knights - Kahimi, Additional Voices
- Pigs Next Door - Additional voices
- Power Rangers in Space - Venus de Milo
- Sabrina's Secret Life - Cassandra
- Speed Racer X - Trixie, Spritle
- Stargate Infinity - Stacey Bonner
- The Kids from Room 402 - Tillie
- The Secret Files of the Spy Dogs - Additional Voices
- Transformers: Robots in Disguise - Dorie Dutton

=== Film ===
- Digimon: The Movie - Biyomon, Yolei Inoue, Birthday Girl, Grocery Girl
- Digimon Adventure 02: Revenge of Diaboromon - Yolei Inoue
- Digimon Tamers Runaway Locomon - Riley Otori

== Crew work ==
- Breaker High - 2nd Music Engineer
- Casper: A Spirited Beginning - Assistant Music Engineer
- Mighty Morphin Power Rangers - Assistant Editor
- Power Rangers in Space - Music Assistant
- Power Rangers Turbo - Music Assistant
