= Katie Volding =

American actress

- Born: Katie Stiehler; February 13, 1989 (age 37); Santa Monica, California, U.S.
- Occupation: Actress
- Years active: 1994–2009

Katie Stiehler (née Volding) is a former American actress. In 2000, she was nominated for a Young Artist Award in the category "Best Performance in a TV Movie or Pilot" for her performance in the Disney Channel Original Movie Smart House.

== Acting career ==
In 1997, Volding appeared in the ABC sitcom Teen Angel. She had a main role in the television films Au Pair (1999), Au Pair II (2001), and Au Pair 3: Adventure in Paradise (2009). Volding also played Brink's little sister in the Disney Channel original movie, Brink! In her earlier years, Volding made a small appearance as Uh-Huh's girlfriend at the end of the film Little Rascals.

Volding has since retired from acting and runs a tattoo shop in Upstate New York.

== Filmography ==
Year	Title	Role	Notes
1994	The Little Rascals	Uh-Huh's Girlfriend (uncredited)	
1995	On Nature's Trail Series: Trees for Life	Katie	Video short
1995	On Nature's Trail Series: Circle of Water	Katie	Video short
1995	On Nature's Trail Series: Food Chain	Katie	Video short
1997	Night Sins	Jesse Holt	TV movie
1997	The Practice	Susan Stevenson	Episode: "Dog Bite"
1997	ABC TGIF	Katie Beauchamp	Episode: "Frightful Halloween Bash"
1997–1998	Teen Angel	Katie Beauchamp	Main role
1998	Rhapsody in Bloom	Susie	TV movie
1998	Brink!	Katie Brinker	TV movie
1999	Smart House	Angie Cooper	TV movie
1999	Au Pair	Katie Caldwell	TV movie
1999	Ladies Man	Wendy Stiles	Episode: "Pilot"
2001	Au Pair II	Katie Caldwell	TV movie
2009	Au Pair 3: Adventure in Paradise	Katie Caldwell	TV movie
