= I'm Telling! =

- Logo
- Created by: Ellen Levy
- Developed by: Ellen Levy; Haim Saban
- Directed by: Jerome Shaw
- Presented by: Laurie Faso
- Announcer: Dean Goss
- Theme music composer: Shuki Levy
- Country of origin: United States
- No. of episodes: 26

Production
- Executive producers: Haim Saban; Andy Heyward
- Producer: David M. Greenfield
- Running time: 22–24 minutes
- Production companies: DIC Enterprises; Saban Productions

Original release
- Network: NBC
- Release: September 12, 1987 – March 5, 1988

I'm Telling! is an American television game show, which ran from September 12, 1987 to March 5, 1988 on NBC Saturday mornings and was hosted by Laurie Faso with Dean Goss announcing.

The show is essentially a children's version of The Newlywed Game with young siblings playing instead of married couples. The show was produced by Saban Productions and DIC Enterprises.

== Gameplay ==
=== Main game ===
Three teams competed, each often consisting of a brother and sister. The front game was played in two rounds.

In Round 1, the brothers were "teleported" to the "Isolation Zone" using special effects and a video edit (i.e., taken offstage to a soundproof room). One of three pun-styled categories was chosen at random by hitting a plunger, and Faso read a question loosely based on the chosen category. Three questions were played, with each sister choosing one category, and all three sisters responded to every question.

After the sisters' answers were recorded, the brothers were brought back onstage and asked the same three questions. If a brother's response matched his sister's, the team scored points (25 for the first question, 50 for the second, and 75 for the third). If the responses disagreed, no points were awarded. Round 2 was played in the same manner, but with the sisters taken offstage and the brothers providing initial answers. Question values were increased to 50, 75, and 150 points.

The game continued until both rounds were completed or one team had built up an insurmountable lead. The highest-scoring team received a $1,000 savings bond and advanced to the "Pick-A-Prize Arcade" for a chance to win bonus prizes. The other teams each received consolation prizes, including a copy of the I'm Telling! home game.

If two or all three teams were tied for first place after the second round, a tie-breaker question was asked to determine the winner. Before the show, the producers filled a large container with many of the same object and each team wrote down their guess at the number of objects. Whichever team came the closest to the actual number without going over advanced to the Pick-a-Prize Arcade.

=== Pick-a-Prize Arcade ===
At the end of the game, the set was rotated 180 degrees to reveal the Pick-a-Prize Arcade. Twenty prizes were displayed, ten designated for each sibling; the brother's prizes sat on yellow platforms while the sister's sat on pink ones, and a strobe light and pushbutton were placed next to each prize. Prior to the show, each sibling chose the six prizes that he/she thought the other would most like to have.

The home audience was shown one sibling's choices, after which the other one selected six prizes by pushing their buttons. Every time the siblings' choices matched, a siren sounded and the light next to that prize flashed. After both siblings had taken a turn, the team won all prizes they had matched; if they made at least ten matches between them, they won everything.

== Broadcast history ==
The last first-run episode aired on March 5, 1988, and repeats aired until August 27. Reruns were seen on The Family Channel from September 9, 1989 to September 8, 1990; August 29, 1994 to September 30, 1995; and October 30, 1995 to March 29, 1996.

== Special episodes ==
While most shows featured brother/sister teams, special episodes were also aired in order to accommodate siblings of the same gender, known as "Brothers' Day" or "Sisters' Day", in which the teams would be all male or all female respectively. Youthful stars of NBC's prime-time series also played with their real-life siblings on two episodes, known as "Celebrity Day". Each team played on behalf of a chosen charity, and the show donated $500 plus the value of all prizes won in the bonus round to the one represented by the winning team.

== Merchandise ==
A board game was released by Pressman in 1987.
