= Blindfold: Acts of Obsession =

1994 erotic television film by Lawrence L. Simeone

- DVD cover
- Genre: Crime; Thriller
- Written by: Lawrence L. Simeone
- Directed by: Lawrence L. Simeone
- Starring: Judd Nelson; Shannen Doherty
- Music by: Shuki Levy
- Country of origin: United States
- Original language: English

Production
- Executive producer: Lance H. Robbins
- Producer: Ronnie Hadar
- Production location: Dallas
- Cinematography: Thomas L. Callaway
- Editor: Lawrence L. Simeone
- Running time: 93 min.
- Production companies: Libra Films; Saban Entertainment

Original release
- Network: USA Network
- Release: May 20, 1994

Blindfold: Acts of Obsession is a 1994 erotic television film directed by Lawrence L. Simeone. It was originally aired on the USA Network in the United States in 1994, and later, on C4 in the United Kingdom in 1995.

== Plot ==
Madeleine Dalton was once a wild girl who was drawn to bad boys, but has now settled down with real estate broker Mike Dalton. She is desperate to make her dead-end relationship exciting again and goes seeing a psychiatrist, Dr. Jennings. He suggests her to spice up her sex life by playing games. She decides to give it a try and begins using handcuffs and letting herself be blindfolded.

Meanwhile, several women in Santa Monica are getting handcuffed, blindfolded and knifed to death. Madeleine's sister Chris Madigan is involved with investigating the murders and ends up finding a corpse. She suspects Dr. Jennings is the murderer since he has some sort of connection to a presumed dead killer with an identical modus operandi.

While the identity of the murderer is coming closer to being exposed, Madeleine is drawn more and more into the games. She eventually becomes obsessed with S/M and starts an affair with Dr Jennings, but it takes its toll...

== Cast ==
- Judd Nelson - Dr. Jennings
- Shannen Doherty - Madeleine Dalton
- Kristian Alfonso - Chris Madigan
- Michael Woods - Mike Dalton
- Heidi Lenhart - Young Girl
- Drew Snyder - Alex Saunders

== Production ==
The film contains several explicit nude and sex scenes. Shannen Doherty's character appeared nude several times. While filming in 1993, Doherty and Judd Nelson started an affair and even got engaged in 1994. However, Doherty was still in an abusive relationship with Dean Factor when she became involved with Nelson.
