= Au Pair II =

2001 film

- Region 4 DVD cover.
- Written by: Jeffrey C. Sherman; Cheryl Saban
- Directed by: Mark Griffiths
- Starring: Gregory Harrison; Heidi Lenhart; Jake Dinwiddie; Katie Volding; Rachel York; Robin Dunne
- Composer: Inon Zur
- Country of origin: United States
- Original language: English

Production
- Producers: Lance H. Robbins; Cheryl Saban
- Cinematography: Thomas L. Callaway
- Running time: 97 minutes
- Production company: Saban Entertainment

Original release
- Network: Fox Family
- Release: April 22, 2001

Au Pair II (also known as Au Pair II: The Fairytale Continues) is a 2001 American made-for-television romantic comedy film starring Gregory Harrison and Heidi Lenhart and is the second installment in the Au Pair trilogy. The film was produced by Saban Entertainment and premiered on Fox Family on April 22, 2001.

== Synopsis ==
A year after the events of Au Pair, Jennifer Morgan, Oliver Caldwell, and his kids Katie and Alex are back in Europe as the couple prepare for the merger of Caldwell’s company and another named Tek Hausen.

Cassandra and Michael Hausen, the adult children of Tek Hausen’s founder, are opposed to the merger as they see it taking control of their father's company from them. They plot to ruin Caldwell's image and his engagement to Jennifer, in order to gain control of the combined companies.

== Cast ==
- Gregory Harrison as Oliver Caldwell
- Heidi Lenhart as Jennifer "Jenny" Morgan
- Katie Volding as Katie Caldwell
- Jake Dinwiddie as Alex Caldwell
- Robin Dunne as Michael Hausen
- Cliff Bemis as Sam Morgan
- James Lancaster as Seamus
- Rory Knox Johnston as Karl Hausen
- Celine Massuger as Brigitte Chabeaux, granddaughter to Karl Hausen and niece to Cassandra and Michael
- June Lockhart as Grandma Nell Grayson
- Rachel York as Cassandra Hausen
- Jan Preucil as Grimaldi the Paparazzo
- Dan Brown as Reporter #1
- David O'Kelly as Reporter #2
- Jan Kuzelka as Chef

== Television release ==
In the United States, the movie is occasionally aired on Fox Family's successor, ABC Family/Freeform with the original. In previous airings there has been advertising on the network for a marathon special, and in recent airings, the films went from primetime slots to late daytime slots.
