= James Lancaster (actor) =

Irish-American actor

- Years active: 1982–present
- Spouse: Elizabeth Dennehy (m. 1993)
- Children: 2

James Lancaster is an Irish-American actor. His film roles include Lieutenant Colonel Arthur Fremantle in Gettysburg and Father Byles in Titanic. He had a recurring role as Father Tim Jansen on Days of Our Lives. He studied theater at Trinity College Dublin and moved to Chicago in the 1980s. He has been married to actress Elizabeth Dennehy since 1993, who he met after working on stage with her father, Brian Dennehy.

== Filmography ==
Year	Title	Role	Notes
1982	Les poneys sauvages	Michel	4 episodes
1988	Retreads		
1989	Murder, She Wrote	Councilman Harold Early, Mark Waverly	2 episodes
1990	Die Hard 2	Navigator (Windsor Plane)	
1991	Sisters	Terry Silver	Episode: "One to Grow On"
1993	Gettysburg	Lieut. Col. Arthur Fremantle	
1993	The Discoverers	Isaac Newton	
1994	Leprechaun 2	William O'Day	
1994	Jack Reed: A Search for Justice	Billy	TV movie
1996	Hijacked: Flight 285	Andrew Leary	TV movie
1996	Entertaining Angels: The Dorothy Day Story	Eugene O'Neill	
1996	Dark Skies	Kenneth Parkinson	Episode: "Dark Days Night"
1997	JAG	Johnathan Graham	Episode: "Trinity"
1997	Two Small Voices	Dr. Sutton	TV movie
1997	Titanic	Father Byles	
1998	Buddy Faro	Del Maynard	Episode: "Touched by an Amnesiac"
1998	Chicago Hope	John Galloway	Episode: "The Breast and the Brightest"
1998	Born Free	Merlino	Episode: "Father Figure"
2000	Diagnosis Murder	Lawrence the Waiter	Episode: "Man Overboard"
2000	Lost Souls	Father Jeremy	
2001	Au Pair II	Seamus	TV movie
2002	The Agency		Episode: "Son Set"
2002	Even Stevens	The Duke	Episode: "The King Sloppy"
2003	Days of Our Lives	Father Tim Jansen	Recurring role, 56 episodes
2003	Judging Amy	Dr. Kelton	Episode: "Ex Parte of Five"
2003	Medal of Honor: Rising Sun		Voice role
2004	Spanglish	Businessman	
2005	CSI: NY	Butler Randolph	Episode: "On the Job"
2005	The King of Queens	Roger	Episode: "Sandwiched Out"
2005	Age of Empires III	Morgan Black	Voice role
2005	Numb3rs	Store Owner	Episode: "Convergence"
2006	The Prestige	Moderator	
2007	Pirates of the Caribbean: At World's End	EITC Agent	
2015	A Remedy Worse than the Disease	Ted	Short film
2015	Hot in Cleveland	Liam	Episode: "Vegas Baby/I Hate Goodbyes"
2015	Teddy & Mr. French	Mr. French	Short film
2016	Savage	Therapist	Short film
2016	Titanfall 2	Scientist	Voice role
2016	Lashed Out	Butler	Short film
