= Elves of the Forest =

Japanese anime television series

- 森のトントたち
- Directed by: Masakazu Higuchi
- Music by: Takeo Watanabe
- Country of origin: Japan
- Original language: Japanese
- No. of episodes: 23

Production
- Executive producer: Shigeto Takahashi
- Production company: Zuiyo Enterprise

Original release
- Network: Fuji Television
- Release: October 5, 1984 – March 29, 1985

Elves of the Forest (森のトントたち, Mori no Tonto Tachi) is a Japanese anime television series produced by Zuiyo and animated by Shaft. It was originally broadcast on Fuji TV for 23 episodes between October 5, 1984, and March 29, 1985.

== Plot ==
The family of Joulupukki ("Santa Claus") lives along with the tonttu and wights in a forest in Finnish Lapland. They experience a lot of adventures along with the other residents of the forest; for example, they pack Christmas presents together.

== English adaptation ==
In 1991, episodes were edited together into two short movies called A Christmas Adventure and Christmas Reindeer Tales by DIC Animation City.

== Characters ==
- Patty (Elisa) - Santa Claus's granddaughter.
- Erkki
- Santa Claus (Joulupukki)
- Polly (Mauri)
- Mrs. Claus (Muori)
- Elmi
- Pertti
- Kaarina
- Viktori
- Lasse

== Voice cast ==
- Hiromi Tsuru as Elisa
- Hirotaka Suzuoki as Erkki
- Kōsei Tomita as Joulupukki
- Mayumi Tanaka as Mauri
- Miyoko Asō as Muori
- Rihoko Yoshida as Elmi
- Yuri Nashiwa as the narrator
- Yuu Shimaka as Pertti
- Hitomi Oikawa as Kaarina
- Naoki Tatsuta as Viktori
- Ryō Horikawa as Lasse
- Eken Mine
- Hiroshi Masuoka
- Ikuya Sawaki
- Mitsuo Senda
- Yoshiko Sakakibara

=== English dub ===
- Mike Reynolds as Santa Claus
- Barbara Goodson as Mrs. Claus, Polly
- Rebecca Forstadt as Patty
- Lara Cody as Marty
- Heidi Lenhart as Monica
- Tifanie Christun as Bridget
- Robert V. Barron as Joseph
- Barry Stigler as Bert
- Jeff Winkless as Jeb, Elf
- Tom Wyner as Henry
- Bill Capizzi as Elf
- Steve Kramer as Elf
- Kerrigan Mahan as Elf
- Ron Salaises
- Wendy Iwai
- Yaba Greenfield
- B.J. Sharp

== See also ==
- List of Christmas films
- Santa Claus in film
