= Susie Q (film) =

1996 fantasy-comedy television film by John Blizek

- Genre: Comedy; Drama; Family; Fantasy
- Written by: Shuki Levy; Douglas Sloan
- Directed by: John Blizek
- Starring: Amy Jo Johnson; Justin Whalin; Shelley Long
- Music by: T.H. Culhane; Raul Fernandez; Shuki Levy; Laurence O'Keefe
- Countries of origin: United States; Canada
- Original languages: English; German

Production
- Executive producers: Shuki Levy; Lance H. Robbins
- Producers: James Shavick; Rosanne Milliken
- Cinematography: Robert Fresco
- Editor: David M. Richardson
- Running time: 90 minutes
- Production companies: Libra Pictures; Shavick Entertainment
- Budget: CAD2,000,000

Original release
- Network: Super RTL; Disney Channel (U.S.)
- Release: October 3, 1996

Susie Q is a 1996 fantasy-comedy television film directed by John Blizek and starring Justin Whalin, Amy Jo Johnson and Shelley Long. It originally aired on Super RTL in Germany, followed by Disney Channel's airing of it in the United States on October 3, 1996, as a Disney Channel Premiere Film. The film tells the story of a young woman dying with her beau (Bentley Mitchum) on her way to their Winter Formal back in the mid-1950s and coming back to her old house 40 years later in order to help her parents avoid being kicked out of their trailer park home. Later, Zach (Whalin) moves into Susie's (Johnson) old house, but he is the only one who is able to see Susie.

The film was given a "TV-G" rating, and was already cut for some profanity, but not all, when it primarily aired on the Disney Channel.

This film is the only Disney-related title produced by Saban Entertainment and its extensions. As a project commissioned by Disney on behalf of Super RTL and Disney Channel, it was produced by Saban's adult unit Libra Pictures rather than the main, child-friendly Saban output. It was released as a Disney Channel Premiere Film (DCPF) in 1996, a year before Disney Channel Original Movies (DCOM) made its debut in 1997.

However, Disney never owned the Susie Q copyrights until Disney in 2001 acquired Fox Family Worldwide, which includes Saban Entertainment/Libra Pictures and its assets. Susie Q is the only Saban Entertainment property which contains Disney logos and images in promotional and distributional materials also to be directly Disney-branded among the properties including produced in company's both of Saban and Disney era. Consequently Susie Q rights are currently held by The Walt Disney Company through its subsidiary BVS Entertainment.

== Plot ==
In 1955, in Willow Valley, Washington, teenager Susie Quinn and her boyfriend, Johnny Angel, are driving to their winter formal when their car is struck by another vehicle and falls from a bridge into a river, killing them both. Before the accident, Susie had asked Johnny to return to her house because she was concerned about important papers her grandfather was trying to find for her mother.

Forty years later, Zach Sands moves into Susie’s former home with his widowed mother, Penny, and younger sister, Teri. Zach is struggling with the death of his father in a car accident and has stopped playing basketball out of guilt. While fishing, Zach discovers Susie’s bracelet, causing her ghost to appear. Zach soon learns that he is the only person who can see her.

Susie asks Zach to discover what happened to her family. Zach learns that Susie’s elderly parents are threatened with losing their home because they cannot make a $25,000 payment demanded by the local bank. Susie explains that her grandfather had been searching for a deed before her death and believes her failure to help him find it has prevented her from moving on.

Zach and Teri discover that the missing deed establishes the Quinn family’s ownership of much of Willow Valley. They search for the document while banker Roger Kovich attempts to stop them. After finding the deed, Zach and Teri bring the evidence to their mother, a television reporter, who broadcasts the story. The Quinns’ home is saved, Kovich leaves town to avoid prosecution, and Zach returns to basketball in honor of his father.

Having completed her unfinished business, Susie prepares to leave. At the bridge where she died, she says goodbye to Zach and reunites with the spirits of Johnny and her grandfather before departing with them.

At school the next day, Zach, meets a new student who introduces herself as Maggie, who looks exactly like Susie. It is implied that Susie reincarnated as Maggie so she could be with Zach.

== Cast ==
- Justin Whalin as Zach Sands
- Amy Jo Johnson as Susie Q / Maggie
- Shelley Long as Penny Sands
- Andrea Libman as Teri Sands
- Garwin Sanford as Coach Stanford
- Chris Martin as Ray Kovich
- Bentley Mitchum as Johnny Angel
- Ernie Prentice as Grandfather
- Tasha Simms as Betsy Quinn
- Allan Morgan as Russell Quinn
- Dale Wilson as Roger Kovich
- Winston Brown as Brad
- Sabrina Byrne as Rebecca Bahner
- Mark Schooley as Telephone Repairman
- Lloyd Berry as Al the Janitor
- Benjamin Ratner as TV Director
- Laura Harris as Jannete
- Kirsten Robek as Production Assistant
- Pat Waldron as Miss Crosby
- David Kaye as Don Tanner
- Walter Marsh as Old Man - ATM
- Will Sasso as Officer Bob
- Allan Franz as Rookie Cop
- John Johnston as Announcer
- Carolyn Spielmacher as Girl
- Brian Arnold as James McGlockton
- Rebecca Toolan as Mrs. Perkins
- Aaron Pearl as Player
- Cameron Labine as Thug

== Music ==
- “Susie Q” by Dale Hawkins
- “Play A Love Song” by The Jaguars
- “My Angel Lover” by Cox, Herb & The Cleftones
- “Quickie Wedding” by Don Julian
- “Do What Lovers Do” by Earl Lewis & The Channels

== See also ==
- Teenage tragedy songs of the 50s and early 60s
- List of ghost films
