= Cheryl Saban =

American writer (born 1951)

- Born: Cheryl Lynn Flor; April 30, 1951 (age 75); San Diego, California, U.S.
- Other name: Flower
- Education: California Coast University (PhD)
- Alma mater: San Diego State University
- Occupations: Psychologist; author; philanthropist
- Board member of: Clinton Foundation
- Spouses: Ray Lenhart (m. 1971, divorced) Bobby Ocean (m. 1975, divorced) Haim Saban (m. 1987)
- Children: 4, including Tifanie Lenhart Chaney and Heidi Lenhart Stills

Cheryl Saban (/səˈbɑːn/; born April 30, 1951) is an American author, television writer, philanthropist, and a former Senior Advisor to the United States Mission to the United Nations. She is the author of several children's books, a novel, self-help books, numerous gift books, and many teleplays. She is the wife of Israeli-American billionaire and Democratic party mega-donor Haim Saban.

== Early life and education ==
Cheryl Saban was born as Cheryl Lyn Flor on April 30, 1951, in San Diego, California. Her father worked for the local telephone company. Saban worked as a telephone solicitor, waitressed at a barbecue-pit restaurant, and worked summers as a lifeguard at a Navy training center.

Saban attended San Diego State University. In 2005, she earned a PhD in psychology from California Coast University, one of the institutions examined in a 2004 U.S. Government Accountability Office investigation into federal tuition reimbursement for degrees from "diploma mills" and other unaccredited schools.

== Career ==
Saban started her career as a model in San Francisco, California in 1973 and Los Angeles in 1975. She recorded her first album in 1978 under the name Flower. In April 1979, Playboy included her in a nude pictorial titled “Disco Queens".

Saban accepted a job as an assistant for Israeli-American Haim Saban, a millionaire who later became her husband, in 1986. She wrote for television multiple times, including 19 episodes of Mighty Morphin Power Rangers, produced by Saban. She is the author of four children's books, a thriller, and several self-help books.

Saban was nominated as Senior Advisor to the United States Mission to the United Nations by President Barack Obama in September 2012.

== Philanthropy ==
Saban is the president of Saban Family Foundation. She and her husband both donate through the foundation, which typically focuses on children, education and women's health. Through a $10 million donation, Saban established the Cheryl Saban Self-Worth Foundation for Women & Girls in 2009. The foundation will provide micro-financing programs to women in the U.S. and in Israel.

Saban is on the board of directors of the Clinton Foundation. She received an honorary doctorate from the Ben-Gurion University of the Negev in Israel in 2014. As of May 2018, they are supporting the building of a museum in Los Angeles.

=== Los Angeles Free Clinic ===
In 1968, Los Angeles Free Clinic opened at 115 North Fairfax Avenue, Los Angeles. The Los Angeles Free Clinic is the longest continually running free clinic in the nation.

In her years of financial difficulty, Cheryl Saban was a patient of the Los Angeles Free Clinic. Later, with her husband, they donated $10 million, and in 2008, it was renamed the Saban Free Clinic. now Saban Community Clinic of Beverly Hills, Rampart Village, Hollywood, Melrose, and Blessed Sacrament.

== Personal life ==
Saban has been married three times. She married her first husband, Ray Lenhart, at the age of 20. They had two daughters, Tifanie Lenhart Chaney and actress Heidi Lenhart Stills, and divorced soon after. She later married and divorced Bobby Ocean. He was a music producer, and struggled to provide for her children.

Saban married her third husband, Egyptian-born Israeli-American billionaire Haim Saban in 1987. They had two children through a surrogate (Saban had previously had a hysterectomy): son Ness (Hebrew for Miracle) and daughter Tanya. Ness was the eighth surrogate-born baby in the world and Tanya was the fortieth. Although Cheryl is a Lutheran, she agreed to raise the children Jewish. The family always puts up a Christmas tree and celebrates Shabbat weekly. Saban told the rabbi who married them: "Think of me as a Christian who believes in Judaism.” They reside in Beverly Hills, California.

== Bibliography ==
- Saban, Cheryl (1993). Miracle Child: Genetic Mother, Surrogate Womb. Far Hills, New Jersey: New Horizon Press. ISBN 9780882821221. OCLC 28394531.
- Saban, Cheryl (1995). Griffin's Day at the Zoo. New York: Modern Publishing House. ISBN 9781561446032. OCLC 36659026.
- Saban, Cheryl (1995). Griffin's Busy Day. New York: Modern Publishing House. ISBN 9781561446025. OCLC 35559271.
- Saban, Cheryl (1995). Griffin's Shopping Trip. New York: Modern Publishing House. ISBN 9781561446049. OCLC 35865589.
- Saban, Cheryl (1995). Griffin's Play Group. New York: Modern Publishing House. ISBN 9781561446056. OCLC 35762814.
- Saban, Cheryl (1997). Sins of the Mother. Los Angeles, California: Dove Books. ISBN 9780787112684. OCLC 37023348.
- Saban, Cheryl (2002). 50 Ways To Save Our Children: Small, Medium & Big Ways You Can Change a Child's Life. New York: Harper Trophy. ISBN 9780064490382. OCLC 48046056.
- Saban, Cheryl (2005). Recipe For a Good Marriage: Wise Words and Quirky Advice for Happy, Long-lasting Relationships. New York: Ryland Peters & Small. ISBN 9781841727868. OCLC 57685783.
- Saban, Cheryl (2007). Recipe for Good Parenting: Words of Wisdom for Parents of all Ages, From Parents of All Ages. New York: Ryland Peters & Small. ISBN 9781845975104. OCLC 81860720.
- Saban, Cheryl (2008). New Mother's Survival Guide. New York: Ryland, Peters & Small. ISBN 9781845977139.
- Saban, Cheryl (2009). What Is Your Self-worth? A Woman's Guide to Validation. Carlsbad, California: Hay House. ISBN 9781401923952. OCLC 262892445.
- Saban, Cheryl (2010). Recipe For a Happy Life. New York: Ryland Peters & Small. ISBN 9781845979454. OCLC 465368297.
- Saban, Cheryl (2011). All About My Mother. New York: Ryland Peters & Small. ISBN 9781849750875. OCLC 666246749.
- Saban, Cheryl (2013). Soul Sisters: The Special Relationship of Girlfriends. New York: Ryland Peters & Small. ISBN 9781849753555. OCLC 851655723.
- Saban, Cheryl (2014). The Gift of Grandparenting: Sharing the Delights of Being a Grandparent: A Treasure Trove of Stories and Memories About People We Hold Most Dear. New York: Ryland Peters & Small. ISBN 9781849755122. OCLC 857880296.

== Screenwriting credits ==
=== Television ===
- Mighty Morphin Power Rangers (1993–1995)
- VR Troopers (1994)
- Sweet Valley High (1995)
- Little Mouse on the Prairie (1996)

=== Film ===
- Au Pair (1999)
- Au Pair II (2001)
