= Michael Woolson =

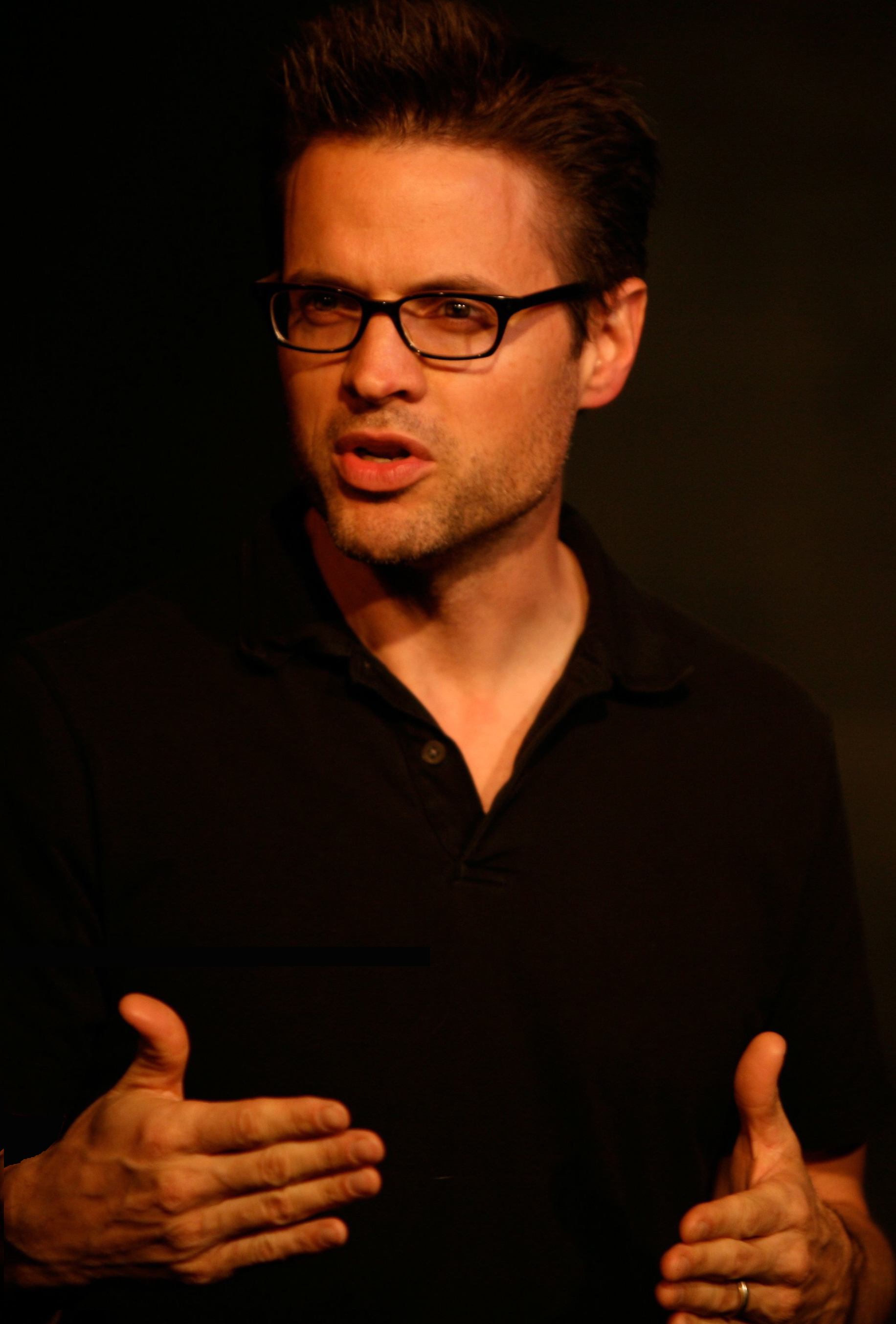
Michael Woolson on the cover of The Work of an Actor - Photographed by Annie McElwain 2010

Michael Woolson is an American acting coach, author, director, and founder of the Michael Woolson Studio in Los Angeles, California.

== Coaching career ==
After spending ten years as a working actor, Michael Woolson began his career as an acting coach in 1999 when he began teaching at the Larry Moss Studio. In 2001, Woolson built and founded the Michael Woolson Studio just outside Beverly Hills where he and his staff conduct classes, as well as produce and direct theatrical productions. His students have included Academy Award nominees and winners, as well as 2023 Golden Globe winners Austin Butler and Evan Peters.

== Publications ==
Michael has published two books on acting: The Work of an Actor, a guide to acting techniques, and Emotion on Demand: An Actor’s Workbook for Mastering Emotional Triggers, a workbook that guides actors through exercises to achieve greater emotional connectivity.

== Clients ==
Notable performers coached by Woolson include:

- Austin Butler
- Evan Peters
- Hailee Steinfeld attributes her Academy Award nominated performance in True Grit to Woolson's coaching.
- Rudy Pankow
- Brie Larson
- Sydney Sweeney
- Dennis Quaid
- Joey King
- Mila Kunis
- Kyle Gallner
- Hilary Duff
- Abigail Breslin
- Chiara Aurelia
- Justin Chon
- Jeanine Mason
