= Heidi Lenhart =

American actress

- Born: Heidi Noelle Lenhart; August 22, 1973 (age 53)
- Other names: Heidi Saban; Heidi Stills; Melody Lee; Melodee Lee
- Occupation: Actress
- Years active: 1988–2010
- Spouses: Robin Dunne (m. 2002; div. 2005) Chris Stills (m. 2006; div. 2011)
- Children: 2
- Mother: Cheryl Saban
- Family: Tifanie Lenhart Chaney (sister); Haim Saban (step-father)

Heidi Lenhart (born August 22, 1973) is an American former actress best known for her lead role in the Au Pair film series and the sitcom California Dreams, and for her anime dubbing work under the name Melody Lee (sometimes spelled Melodee Lee), in particular in El Hazard: The Magnificent World and El Hazard: The Wanderers.

== Family ==
Lenhart is the daughter of Cheryl Saban and Ray Lenhart, a disc jockey. She has an older sister, Tifanie, who is a voice actress. Neither Lenhart nor her sister have a relationship with their birth father.

== Acting career ==
Lenhart was an original cast member as Jenny Garrison in the NBC teen comedy series California Dreams. She was written out of the show at the beginning of the second season when the show decided to focus on the band rather than the Garrison family. Lenhart later went to star as Suzanne Carson in the syndicated television drama Fame L.A. from 1997 to 1998, and had a recurring role in the final season of Fox prime time soap opera Beverly Hills, 90210 (2000).

In film, Lenhart played the leading role of Jennifer "Jenny" Morgan in Au Pair (1999), and its two sequels Au Pair II: The Fairytale Continues (2002), and Au Pair 3: Adventure in Paradise (2009).

== Philanthropy career ==
Lenhart served as a board member for her mother's non-profit, the Cheryl Saban Self-Worth Foundation for Women and Girls, as a parenting, health and wellness, and education advocate and subsequently was named a director of the organization.

== Personal life ==
In 2002, Lenhart married actor Robin Dunne, with whom she co-starred in Au Pair II: The Fairytale Continues. They divorced in 2005. Lenhart subsequently married actor-musician Chris Stills in 2006, with whom she has two daughters. Lenhart filed for divorce in 2011. She writes poetry and lives in a suburb of Los Angeles.

== Filmography ==
=== Films ===
==== Live-action roles ====
Year	Film	Role	Director	Notes
1988	Perfect Victims	Young Model	Shuki Levy	
1994	Trigger Fast	Lucille	David Lister	Credited as Heide Lenhart (sic)
1995	Deadly Sins	Marie	Michael Robison	
1997	Red Meat	Mia	Allison Burnett	
1997	Born Bad	Laura	Jeff Yonis	Direct-to-video release
2002	Crocodile 2: Death Swamp	Mia	Gary Jones	Direct-to-video release. Credited as Heidi Noelle Lenhart

==== Voice roles ====
Year	Film	Role	Director	Notes
1994	Royal Space Force: The Wings of Honnêamise	Riquinni Nonderaiko	Hiroyuki Yamaga	Voice role in the English dub of this direct-to-video anime film that was originally released in Japan in 1987. Credited as Melody Lee
1995	Rakusho! Hyper Doll	Mew Fumizuki		Main voice role in the English dub of this direct-to-video Japanese anime film.

=== Television ===
==== Live-action roles ====
Year(s)	Title	Role(s)	Notes
1990	The Girl Who Came Between Them	Betty	TV movie. Credited as Heidi Noelle Lenhart
1990	A Quiet Little Neighborhood, A Perfect Little Murder	Woman Neighbor	TV movie. Credited as Heidi Noelle Lenhart
1992–1994	California Dreams	Jenny Garrison	Main role for first 16 episodes. Credited as Heidi Noelle Lenhart
1994	Shadow of Obsession	Patty Abruzzi	TV movie
1994	Blindfold: Acts of Obsession	Young Girl	TV movie. Credited as Heidi Noelle Lenhart
1994	Menendez: A Killing in Beverly Hills	Gail	TV movie. Credited as Heidi Noelle Lenhart
1996	Maybe This Time	Monique	S1E17 "St. Valentine's Day Massacre". Credited as Heidi Noelle Lenhart
1996	The Burning Zone	Arla McKee	S1E5 "Night Flight". Credited as Heidi Noelle Lenhart
1996–1997	Night Stand with Dick Dietrick	Fifi LeBustier; Chantal	S1E47 "Gold-Diggers of 1996"; S2E30 "Eurotrash"
1997	Silk Stalkings	Sarah	S6E14 "The Babysitter". Credited as Heidi Noelle Lenhart
1997	Pacific Blue	Sheila Brighton	S2E22 "Rumplestiltskin". Credited as Heidi Noelle Lenhart
1997–1998	Fame L.A.	Suzanne Carson	Main role; 21 episodes
1998	Addams Family Reunion	Melinda Adams	TV movie
1999	Zoe, Duncan, Jack and Jane	Subway Girl	S1E11 "Down and Out at Bleecker and Houston". Credited as Heidi Noelle
1999	Au Pair	Jennifer Morgan	TV movie. Credited as Heidi Noelle Lenhart
1999	Little Men	Isabelle McGregor	S2E4 "Opposites Attract"; S2E6 "Leap of Faith". Credited as Heidi Noelle Lenhart
1999	The Pretender	Shea; Carrie Goltz	S4E6 "Extreme". Credited as Heidi Noelle Lenhart
2000	Beverly Hills, 90210	Ellen	6 episodes. Credited as Heidi Noelle Lenhart
2000	Final Ascent	Beth	TV movie. Credited as Heidi Noelle Lenhart
2001	Au Pair II	Jennifer "Jenny" Morgan	TV movie
2009	Au Pair 3: Adventure in Paradise	Jenny Morgan Caldwell	TV movie. Credited as Heidi Saban
2010	Late Night with Jimmy Fallon	Self (guest)	March 4, 2010 episode

==== Voice roles ====
Year(s)	Title	Role(s)	Notes
1988	Noozles	Sandy Brown	Main voice role in English dub. Original series was broadcast in Japan in 1984.
1991	A Christmas Adventure	Monica	Voice for English dub of this TV movie, which was stitched together from various episodes of the Japanese anime series Elves of the Forest originally broadcast in 1984–1985. Credited as Heidi Noelle Lenhart
1993	Moldiver	Sayuri	Main voice role for the English dub of this six-episode Japanese anime miniseries. Credited as Melodee Lee
1993–1995	Orguss 02	Natamura	Main voice role for the English dub of this six-episode direct-to-DVD Japanese anime miniseries. Credited as Melodee Lee
1994	BattleTech: The Animated Series	Voice	S1E1 "The Gathering Storm". Credited as Melody Lee
1994–1995	Creepy Crawlers	Sammy Reynolds	Main voice role, 17 episodes. Also performed various additional voices.
1995	The Adventures of Hutch the Honeybee	Haley	Main voice role in English dub. Original series was broadcast in Japan from 1970–1971.
1995–1996	El-Hazard: The Magnificent World	Afura Mann	Main voice role for the English dub of this seven-episode Japanese anime miniseries. Credited as Melody Lee
1996	The Why Why Family	Various voices	10 episodes
1996–1997	Eagle Riders	Kelly Jenar	Main role; 64 episodes
1997	El-Hazard 2: The Magnificent World	Afura Mann	Main voice role for the English dub of this four-episode Japanese anime miniseries. Credited as Melody Lee
