= Au Pair (film) =

- Region 4 DVD cover
- Written by: Jeffrey C. Sherman; Cheryl Saban
- Directed by: Mark Griffiths
- Starring: Gregory Harrison; Heidi Noelle Lenhart; Jane Sibbett; Katie Volding; Jake Dinwiddie; John Rhys-Davies
- Music by: Inon Zur
- Country of origin: United States
- Original language: English

Production
- Executive producers: Lance H. Robbins; Cheryl Saban
- Producer: Mike Elliott
- Cinematography: Blake T. Evans
- Editor: John Gilbert
- Running time: 96 minutes
- Production company: Saban Entertainment

Original release
- Network: Fox Family Channel
- Release: August 22, 1999

Related
- Au Pair II: The Fairytale Continues

Au Pair is a 1999 American made-for-television romantic comedy film starring Gregory Harrison and Heidi Noelle Lenhart. The film was produced by Saban Entertainment and premiered on Fox Family Channel on August 22, 1999. The film is the first in the Au Pair trilogy.

== Plot ==
Jennifer "Jenny" Morgan (Heidi Noelle Lenhart) is a young and intelligent working-class woman who just graduated from UCLA with an MBA. She is engaged to Charlie, a feckless man who intends to spend his summer traveling around Europe. After a job offer falls through, she finds herself searching and responds to a promising job ad for Oliver Caldwell's (Gregory Harrison) company, Caldwell Corporation International (CCI). She gets an interview and is led to believe that it is a copy room position, which she decides to move forward with, thinking it would be a foot into the company. Jenny gets the job and is surprised and overwhelmed when a car and its chauffeur show up at her door, telling her to pack and that she is to leave for Paris in a couple of hours. Through a series of errors, Jenny is baffled to discover that she was hired to be the au pair for Oliver's two children, Katie (Katie Volding) and Alex (Jake Dinwiddie).

== Cast ==
- Gregory Harrison as Oliver Caldwell
- Heidi Noelle Lenhart as Jennifer 'Jenny' Morgan
- Jane Sibbett as Vivian Berger
- Katie Volding as Katie Caldwell
- Jake Dinwiddie as Alex Caldwell
- Richard Riehle as Sam Morgan
- Michael Woolson as Charlie Cruikshank
- John Rhys-Davies as Nigel Kent
- Larry Robbins as Ernie
- Pat Elliott as Sutton Parks Employee
- Dávid Ungvári as Receptionist
- Kristin Hansen as Matronly Woman
- Éva Gyetvai as Secretary
- Peter Linka as L.A. Chauffeur
- Caitlin Griffiths as Girl on Plane

== Release ==
The film was originally released in 1999. It has had the most viewers in the network's TV Movie history. The film has been released on Region 4 DVD.
