= BVS Entertainment =

American production company

BVS Entertainment, Inc.
- Final official logo, used from 1996 to 2001
- Formerly: Saban Productions, Inc. (1980–1989); Saban Entertainment, Inc. (1989–2001)
- Type: Subsidiary
- Industry: Animation; Filmmaking
- Founded: April 24, 1980; 46 years ago
- Founders: Haim Saban; Shuki Levy
- Defunct: 2001; 25 years ago (Saban Entertainment)
- Successors: Hasbro Entertainment (Power Rangers franchise); Toei Animation Inc. (Digimon franchise); BMG Rights Management (music library); Saban Capital Group (branding)
- Area served: Worldwide
- Products: Television shows; Theatrical films
- Owner: Haim Saban (1980–2001); News Corporation (1996–2001); The Walt Disney Company (2001–present)
- Parent: Independent (1980–1996); Fox Family Worldwide (1996–2001); ABC Family Worldwide (2001–present)
- Subsidiaries: BVS International N.V. (1989–2016); Jetix Europe N.V. (73.3%) (1996–2009); SIP Animation (1980–2023); Créativité et Développement (1996–1998)

BVS Entertainment, Inc., formerly known as Saban Productions, Saban International and Saban Entertainment, is a subsidiary of the Walt Disney Company. Founded on April 24, 1980, as a music production company by Haim Saban and Shuki Levy, it slowly transitioned to or gravitated towards television production and distribution, where it is most known for producing and distributing children's programs for Fox Family/ABC Family and defunct channels Fox Kids and Jetix.

The company imported, dubbed and adapted various media formats from Japan such as Maple Town, Noozles, Funky Fables, Samurai Pizza Cats, and the first three Digimon series to North American and international markets over syndication, including both animation and live-action shows. Saban also adapted various tokusatsu shows from Toei Company, including Power Rangers (based on the Super Sentai series), Big Bad Beetleborgs (based on Juukou B-Fighter), VR Troopers (featuring elements of various Metal Hero series), and Masked Rider (featuring elements of Kamen Rider Black RX).

They have also distributed and provided music for television programs produced by outside companies such as The Super Mario Bros. Super Show!, Inspector Gadget and the first two dubbed seasons of Dragon Ball Z.

In the 1990s, Saban also operated the Libra Pictures label which produced programs targeted towards older audiences than Saban's usual kid-friendly output, as well as a syndicated subsidiary Saban Domestic Distribution, whose primarily purpose was to distribute shows for first-run and off-net syndication.

== History ==
=== The early years ===
The first Saban Productions respective name and logo depicted a Saturn-like planet with "Saban", in a Pac-Man style font, going across the planet's ring

Saban Entertainment was formed on April 24, 1980, as Saban Productions, Inc., which was initially a music production company. In 1981, it formed a longtime relationship with DIC Audiovisuel and DIC Enterprises to create soundtracks for their programs; Saban also composed music for companies like Ruby-Spears Enterprises and Filmation.

In 1984, Saban moved into production outright with its first television program Kidd Video, a co-production with DIC Enterprises, and it was picked up by NBC as part of their Saturday morning lineup. The next project Saban produced was Macron 1, an English version of GoShogun featuring pop music, which was picked up for syndication by Orbis Communications for the fall of 1986.

In 1986, Saban Productions bought the foreign rights to the DIC Enterprises library of children's programming from DIC's parent DIC Animation City and then sold the rights to Créativité et Développement shortly afterward, leading to DIC suing Saban for damages before reaching a settlement in 1991. In 1987, DIC expanded its relationship with Saban Productions to co-produce several shows, with Saban handling international distribution. That year, both DIC and Saban Productions collaborated to provide series commitments to 26 episodes of I'm Telling! and 13 episodes of The New Archies for NBC.

On June 10, 1987, Saban Productions expanded to live-action TV and theatrical features with plans for a television film on NBC, an hour-long late-night series for CBS, a first-run strip for syndication, and a theatrical feature film. Several pilots such as Love on Trial, Hidden Rage, Shocking But True were produced but never realized.

In late October 1987, Saban Productions had obtained three independently produced projects as part of its first slate for the NATPE conference. The three strips included Love Court, a collaboration with television syndicator Orbis Communications; All-American Family Challenge, a game show taped at Six Flags; and Alphy's Hollywood Power Party, a teen celebrity dance show; the fourth project would be a network game show version of the board game Uno, which was set for NBC, and was to be produced by Peter Berlin and Rob Fiedler, who joined Saban shortly after Wordplay was cancelled.

The Saban logo used between 1988 and 1996

In 1988, Saban Productions and Washington-based newspaper columnist Jack Anderson agreed to produce four quarterly specials under the branding American Expose, with then-future Cops creator/producer John Langley and Malcolm Barbour serving as producers. Orbis Communications, who previously syndicated Macron 1, signed on to distribute the programs. Saban International N.V would distribute the same programs and other non-Saban television material, including international sales of DIC programs such as Hey Vern, It's Ernest! prior to a lawsuit in 1990.

By early 1989, Saban formed the Saban/Scherick Productions division for production done with Edgar Scherick, primarily miniseries and made-for-TV films. Around this time, they also began syndicating the film library of New World Pictures (which had been sold to Trans-Atlantic Entertainment, consisting of ex-New World employees) to television stations. As the company grew, additional executives were hired to push into new areas like prime time programming. Saban created a division, Saban International N.V., based in both the U.S. and the Netherlands, for the international distribution of its shows (not to be confused with the interchangeable but separate company Saban International Paris). Saban hired Stan Golden from Horizon International TV to head their international distribution arm. Then in August 1989, Tom Palmieri came from MTM Enterprises to become Saban's president. On September 13, the company renamed itself Saban Entertainment, Inc. CLT in Luxembourg had signed a deal with Saban to market TV shows. Also that year, Saban started Saban Video, with distribution being handled by Hi-Tops Video.

In 1990, Saban entered into a partnership with video game publisher Acclaim Entertainment and syndicator Bohbot Entertainment to develop the program Video Power. In 1991, Saban Entertainment struck a home video deal with Prism Entertainment that would allow Saban International the international distribution rights to select films. In 1992, Saban signed a domestic distribution deal with Bohbot Communications to syndicate Saban's Around the World in Eighty Dreams and Saban's Gulliver's Travels as part of its Amazin' Adventures block.

=== Partnership with Marvel Entertainment Group ===
In 1992, Saban partnered with the Marvel Entertainment Group to produce an animated series based on Marvel's comic-book heroes the X-Men. Saban obtained the rights in a joint partnership with PolyGram Filmed Entertainment and the Fox Kids Network, becoming Saban's first hit program (running until 1997) and the company's first breakthrough, in partnership with another company. The following year, Saban brought another hit to the Fox Kids lineup, Mighty Morphin Power Rangers, an adaptation of the Japanese Super Sentai franchise. In 1994 alone, licensed Power Rangers merchandise made Saban over a billion dollars in profits. At distinct times in the 1980s, both Loesch and Saban had attempted adaptations of these shows, but had found themselves repeatedly rejected by other networks.

Later on in 1992, Saban formed a syndication subsidiary, Saban Domestic Distribution, and unveiled a $50 million development slate. David Goodman, formerly of Goodman Entertainment Group, served as senior vice president of the company. In 1994, Saban Entertainment launched Libra Pictures in an effort to gear films for older audiences, while the Saban name was used for kid-friendly material, in a similar manner what The Walt Disney Studios and Touchstone Pictures would have to offer. In the same year, Saban signed a deal with A*Vision Entertainment to distribute cassettes under the Saban Home Entertainment and Libra Home Entertainment banners.

In December 1994, Saban launched a partnership/joint venture with UPN (then owned by Paramount and Chris-Craft Industries) to establish the UPN Kids block. The block would eventually premiere on September 10, 1995, with Space Strikers and Teknoman. In 1995, the Saban Interactive unit was established to produce CD-ROM software based on the Power Rangers franchise.

On October 17, 1995, Libra Pictures president Lance Robbins was made Saban's president of motion pictures and television. On November 3, 1995, Saban Entertainment and the Fox Broadcasting Company entered into a partnership where the two companies would create children's programing channels and services, develop and distribute programing and build licensing and merchandising opportunities on a global basis, and help expand Saban programs' reach.

In February 1996, Saban Domestic Distribution launched a Syndicated television block in the United States, entitled "The Saban Network for Kids!". Between 1996 and mid-1997, it included the original North American dub of Dragon Ball Z (a collaboration between Funimation, Ocean Group and Saban), a new Saban-produced dub of the Gatchaman anime titled Eagle Riders, two newly produced programmes - Saban's Adventures of Oliver Twist and The Why Why Family, new episodes of Masked Rider (formerly a Fox Kids show) and VR Troopers and repeats of Samurai Pizza Cats and Tenko and the Guardians of the Magic. Some of the block's programmes corresponded with FCC mandates, with The Why Why Family being the first FCC-friendly program produced by the company. The shows from the block were mainly syndicated to Fox, UPN and WB affiliate stations, with a small number of independent stations also airing some of the shows. Dragon Ball Z had strong ratings during its first season, which led to Saban airing it in its own hour-long two episode block for its second season, which ran in syndication from late 1997 to mid-1998.

=== Saban under Fox Family Worldwide ===
In July 1996, Fox Kids Network secured rights from Marvel Entertainment Group for Captain America, Daredevil and Silver Surfer and additional characters to be developed into four series and 52 episodes over seven years. In the same month, Saban formed a new division, Saban Enterprises International, to handle international licensing, merchandising and promotional activities under president Michael Welter. Oliver Spiner, senior vice president of Saban International, took over operational duties previously handled by Welter. Eric S. Rollman was promoted from senior vice president production to executive vice president of Saban Animation.

Also in late 1996, Fox Kids Network (owned by News Corporation) merged with Saban Entertainment to form Fox Kids Worldwide. Fox Kids Network, distinct from the Fox Kids television block itself, had themselves recently acquired the animation library of Marvel Productions and Marvel Films Animation, with that deal closing in January 1997. When Haim Saban initially had discussions with News Corporation owner Rupert Murdoch, the latter proposed buying Saban’s company, but Saban preferred a partnership instead. Shortly afterwards, Saban terminated its home video distribution deal with WarnerVision Entertainment and moved to Twentieth Century Fox Home Entertainment. In December 1996, Saban Domestic Distribution announced that they would launch an additional syndicated block - "X-Men … and More!" in the Fall of 1997, of which the hour-long serials would consist of an episode of X-Men: The Animated Series and other Marvel programmes such as Iron Man and Fantastic Four. Saban also announced that they would produce a revival of Captain Kangaroo for the now-named Saban Kids Network syndication block. During this period, Saban's partnership with UPN continued, despite the Fox merger. Saban and UPN worked together on two original animated programs titled Bureau of Alien Detectors and The Mouse and the Monster, with the shows airing on UPN Kids in 1996-97, and having the rights jointly split between the two entities. In 1996-97, UPN Kids also aired a new animated series based on The Incredible Hulk. Saban provided music for the show (produced by the Marvel related-New World Animation) during its first season, before becoming a co-producer on it during the second season, following the Fox merger. Saban's Sweet Valley High series, which had previously aired in syndication during its first three seasons, moved to UPN Kids for its fourth and final season in late 1997. Saban also granted UPN Kids the rights to air reruns of former Fox Kids programs in 1998, including X-Men: The Animated Series (which ended in late 1997) and Big Bad Beetleborgs and Spider-Man: The Animated Series (which both ended in early 1998).

In 1998, Saban Entertainment began exclusively producing programs for Fox Kids and Fox Family, while its syndication unit Saban Domestic Distribution refocused on developing films for syndication outside of Fox channels. The last North American show they produced for a non-Fox entity was the live action comedy Breaker High, which premiered on UPN Kids in late 1997.

Marvel was developing a Captain America animated series with Saban Entertainment for Fox Kids to premiere in fall 1998. However, due to Marvel's bankruptcy, the series was canceled before the premiere.

In the 1990s, Marvel began selling off the film rights to their characters due to their financial issues, with the rights to the X-Men IP going to 20th Century Fox in October 1993, who released a live action film in 2000. However, this deal only covered the rights to films and live-action television shows, which allowed an animated series with no involvement from Fox and Saban to air on Kids' WB in 2000. Saban, Marvel and 20th Century Fox would all eventually become parts of The Walt Disney Company; Saban (renamed BVS Entertainment) in 2001, Marvel by the end of 2009 and 20th Century Fox in 2019.

=== Sale to The Walt Disney Company ===
On July 23, 2001, it was announced that the group would be sold to The Walt Disney Company as part of the sale of Fox Family Worldwide/Fox Kids Worldwide (which Disney renamed ABC Family Worldwide) by Haim Saban and News Corporation, and on October 24, 2001, the sale was completed with Saban Entertainment, Inc. rebranding as BVS (Buena Vista Studios) Entertainment, Inc. on November 29, 2001. The final program fully produced and distributed by Saban Entertainment and Saban International N.V. was Power Rangers Time Force, which ran throughout 2001, however, Power Rangers Wild Force was the final series created and pre-produced by Saban as MMPR Productions, the producer of the Power Rangers series from 1993 to 2001.

Following Disney's acquisition of Saban, its subsidiaries were also rebranded, with Saban International N.V. becoming BVS International N.V. and Saban International Services, Inc. becoming BVS International Services, Inc. Saban's 49.6% stake of Saban International Paris was purchased along with Fox Family Worldwide after Saban stepped down from the studio and the studio was rebranded as "SIP Animation" in October 2002, as the studio was not allowed to use the "Saban" brand after its take-over.

Saban's distribution branch was folded into Buena Vista Television on May 1, 2002. A week prior, Fox Kids Europe announced that Buena Vista International Television would take over distribution services of Saban's children's library from Saban International on the same day. The strategy remained the same with Fox Kids Europe continuing to handle all television rights in Europe and the Middle East with Buena Vista handling servicing, while Saban content not under FKE would be handled exclusively by Buena Vista for all territories including rights outside of Europe and the Middle East.

Saban's European licensing subsidiary based in the United Kingdom, Saban Consumer Products Europe, which had been integrated within Fox Kids Europe since the end of 2000, was renamed as Active Licensing Europe on April 13, 2003, and eventually Jetix Consumer Products on May 4, 2004.

=== Legacy ===
Prior to the sale, Disney was only involved with one title produced by Saban Entertainment and its extensions. Susie Q, commissioned by Disney on behalf of Super RTL and Disney Channel, was produced by Saban's adult label Libra Pictures and was released in 1996. Disney would gain the Susie Q copyrights following its purchase of Saban in 2001. Including the shows produced after the sale, Susie Q is the only BVS Entertainment property to be directly Disney-branded among the other BVS properties.

Following the completion of the sale, Disney shut down Saban Entertainment's animation unit, but animation production continued at SIP Animation, which BVS held a minority stake in at the time. In this period, all shows produced and owned by BVS Entertainment (which did not receive its own logo) and SIP Animation were distributed by Buena Vista International Television and ended with their logos.

Buena Vista International logo used by BVS Entertainment and SIP Animation programs

The portion of Saban that handled ADR production and post-production services for anime's English-language dubbing was renamed by ABC Family Worldwide as "Sensation Animation" on September 9, 2002; and remained as such so Disney could continue dubbing Digimon (the second half of Digimon Tamers and Digimon Frontier) episodes. Once production ended in July 2003, Sensation Animation was closed and folded into Walt Disney Television Animation. Disney would later go on to dub the four remainder Digimon films, Revenge of Diaboromon (DA02), Battle of Adventurers (DT), Runaway Locomon (DT) and Island of the Lost Digimon (DF) in 2005 and the fifth TV season, Digimon Data Squad in 2007, but this time, the dubbing was handled by post-production studio Studiopolis. The majority of the past voice actors returned with a lack of some voice actors such as Joshua Seth.

After BVS Entertainment continued production of the Power Rangers franchise throughout the 2000s, Haim Saban founded Saban Capital Group and Saban Brands in 2010 and bought back Power Rangers and related properties from Disney. Saban Brands produced programs such as Power Rangers seasons starting with Power Rangers Samurai and Glitter Force. Saban Brands closed in 2018, with many of its assets being acquired by Hasbro.

ABC Family produced a third film in Saban's Au Pair film series, Au Pair 3: Adventure in Paradise, in 2009, featuring Haim Saban's stepdaughter Heidi Saban again in the leading role. Disney would not produce any more new projects based on pre-existing BVS properties until X-Men '97 in 2024. The show's title was a reference to the year X-Men: The Animated Series ended, and it featured much of the same cast and crew.

Disney served very little other than to hold copyrights for existing Saban properties. The company only existed legally after its last production, Power Rangers RPM, in 2009. Disney took little action other than merging the company's subsidiaries, such as Teen Dream Productions, Interprod Inc., Laurel Way Productions, and SIP Animation into BVS Entertainment. Most BVS Entertainment properties have not been exploited by Disney since the late 2000s.

== Subsidiaries and divisions ==
The company had many subsidiaries around the world, some established to gain financial advantages; not all subsidiaries were actively producing shows, but contributed to the production or distribution of shows in certain aspects. All of these subsidiaries were later terminated by Disney into BVS Entertainment or other Disney units.

=== SIP Animation ===
SIP Animation, formerly known as Saban International Paris, was a television production studio based in France, operating from 1977 to 2009. Saban International Paris was founded in France by Haim Saban and Jacqueline Tordjman in 1977 as a record label; in 1989, it moved into the animation field. In November 1991, Saban International Paris became a separately-operated facility after its shares were divided in thirds, with Saban Entertainment holding a 49.8% share (later reduced to 49.6%). In 2001, Disney inherited Saban's 49.6% stake in Saban International Paris as part of its purchase of Fox Family Worldwide. The studio was renamed as SIP Animation in October 2002, and continued producing shows with this respective name until it went dormant in 2009. Although the studio was a separately operated multi-shareholder unit between 1991 and 2012, BVS International N.V. owned the rights to "SIP Animation" respective name, brand, logo and trademark between 2002 and 2012. Disney became the sole shareholder partner in the studio through BVS Entertainment in 2012 and it was terminated and fully closed in October 2023. Following the formal dissolution of the studio, all remaining assets owned by SIP became the property of its parent company BVS Entertainment.

Créativité et Développement (1987–1998):

A rebranding of DIC's French unit (run by Jean Chalopin) after it split from DIC's American unit (run by Andy Heyward), which produced programs into the mid-1990s and owned some of DIC's earliest series. In April 1996, it was acquired by Saban International Paris (including the rights to produce a Diabolik series), and in 1998 its assets were liquidated by Saban. Some of these assets are still owned by Disney.

=== Jetix Europe N.V. ===
Jetix Europe N.V., formerly Fox Kids Europe N.V. (1996–2009): BVS Entertainment held 73.3% priority shares in Jetix Europe N.V. to the behalf of its parent company Freeform Worldwide Inc. The parent Jetix company in the Netherlands was responsible for financing, sales and operations across Europe. These shares were later transferred to Disney Holdings B.V.

- Jetix Consumer Products: UK based company, formerly Saban Consumer Products and Active Licensing Europe.

=== Other subsidiaries and divisions ===
- BVS International N.V. - formerly Saban International N.V. (1989–2016): Saban's international distribution arm. It was an offshore company based in Curaçao. While it held the majority of the shares of Jetix Europe N.V. along with BVS Entertainment, it had commercial rights to the SIP Animation trademark after 2002, and was also a copyright claimant for many shows and films. It was dissolved in 2016.
  - Vesical Limited: It was the company that held the DIC catalog (such as Inspector Gadget, Dennis the Menace and Heathcliff etc.), whose pre-1990 music was mostly composed by Haim Saban and Shuki Levy. Saban acquired the company and its assets, gaining the distribution rights to the DIC catalog outside the US, and these rights remained with BVS Entertainment until DIC re-purchased these rights in 2006.
- BVS International Services Inc. - formerly Saban International Services Inc.- (1986–2011): It was founded in 1986 as Shinwa Productions to import, license and dub foreign TV shows. After changing its name twice as Saban International Trading Company and Saban International Services Inc., it took its last name in 2001. The dubbing and licensing copyrights of the imported shows were registered in the name of this company. It was merged with the parent company in 2011.
- BVS International Programming A.V.V. (1994–2007): It started its operations as an offshore company based in Aruba. Its first name was "Fox Kids International Programming A.V.V." The copyrights of several series, such as Xyber 9: New Dawn and NASCAR Racers, were registered in its name. It was dissolved in 2007.
- Saban/Sherick Productions: Founded together with Edgar Sherick in 1989. It was involved in live-action film and TV series production and was then completely acquired by Saban. It was closed in May 2001, shortly before Disney took over the company.
- Laurel Way Productions Inc.: Co-producer and copyright claimant of Xyber 9: New Dawn. It was merged with the parent company in 2011.
- Teen Dream Productions Inc. (1994–2011): The company's only purpose was taking part in the production of Sweet Valley High. It was dissolved by merging with the parent company in 2011.
- MMPR Productions Inc.: It appears in the credits as a subcontractor for Power Rangers shows produced between 1993 and 2001. Its fate is unknown.
- Interprod Inc.: It was often featured in the credits of live-action TV and home video films, and was the copyright claimant for some films. It was merged with the parent company in 2011.
- Ventura Film Distributors B.V.: Another group company based in the Netherlands. It is often featured in the credits of shows produced by Saban International Paris. Its fate is unknown. Its name appears in the 2001 Fox Family Worldwide-Disney purchase document and 1998 home video rights security agreement document.
- Sensation Animation: It was simply a rebranding by Disney of Saban's ADR/post-production/dubbing studios, which translated the fourth season of Digimon: Digital Monsters. It was closed down and absorbed into Walt Disney Television Animation on July 14, 2003.

==== Libra Pictures ====
Libra Home Entertainment logo used between 1998 and 2001

Libra was founded to produce programs targeted to older audiences, like Saban did in its early years. It produced mostly co-productions with Shavick Entertainment and O'Hara-Horowitz. Although it is a separate unit, it has existed only as a label and was not a legal entity. Throughout its existence, it produced low-budget B-grade films, some of them erotic thrillers, for TV networks and the direct-to-video home entertainment market. Saban's business partner, Shuki Levy, was usually in charge of the productions produced by this unit, and he was also included in the credits of most shows produced in this unit. The productions from Shuki Levy's personal company, Vertigo Pictures, were later licensed by Saban Entertainment via Libra Pictures, and are still owned by Disney; Vertigo Pictures was suspended by FTB/SOS in 2004. Disney acquired the trademark rights to Libra Pictures with Saban in 2001 and then discontinued the unit. Except for some definitive titles, it is unknown today how much of the Libra catalog is entirely owned by Disney, due to numerous co-productions or the transfer of home video/international distribution rights and/or some copyrights to third parties in the years before Disney acquired Saban Entertainment.

Susie Q, the only Disney-branded production in Saban's history, some films from NBC's Moment of Truth series and erotic-thriller Blindfold: Acts of Obsession starring Shannen Doherty and Judd Nelson, constitute a significant part of the Libra catalog. Libra also contributed to the production of Terminal Velocity, a Hollywood Pictures-Buena Vista theatrical movie.

== Filmography ==
The company's main U.S. unit produced and distributed television shows and films as Saban Entertainment until the last quarter of 2001. Afterwards, BVS Entertainment continued to produce Power Rangers series and SIP Animation continued to produce animated series. However, the BVS Entertainment corporate umbrella also remained the parent company, holding the company's subsidiaries, even though shows produced or distributed by subsidiaries of the company are not credited to BVS Entertainment.

== Media releases ==
Most Saban Entertainment-owned media from the early 1990s made their way to VHS in most regions. However, from the late 1990s on, almost all Saban Entertainment-owned entities were only released as Australian and New Zealand Region 4 VHSes. And also, according to current North American rights holders, Walt Disney Studios Home Entertainment still has no plans to release these titles to DVD and Blu-ray, and as such, some of them instead aired on their sibling television channel, Disney XD and originally was on Toon Disney and ABC Family until the retirement of the Jetix branding in the U.S. In most European countries, Fox Kids Europe (later as "Jetix Europe") had a sister channel called Fox Kids Play (later as "Jetix Play") which aired various Saban Entertainment programs and shows owned by Fox Kids Europe/Jetix Europe. Some shows were also released on DVD and VHS by various independent distributors, such as Maximum Entertainment in the United Kingdom. Many Marvel-related series distributed by Saban and some of their live-action films such as Richie Rich's Christmas Wish and Three Days are available on the Disney+ streaming service, while The Tick is available on Hulu, and Prime Video has Sweet Valley High and A.T.O.M. available only in the United States.

On March 13, 2012, Shout! Factory announced a home video distribution deal with Saban Brands, which includes VR Troopers, the first two seasons of Big Bad Beetleborgs and Ninja Turtles: The Next Mutation. The first 17 seasons of Power Rangers have been licensed for DVD releases by Shout! Factory, which has released the first 17 seasons to DVD in Region 1. In Germany, they have released complete-season boxsets to every Power Rangers series, along with the English versions included up until season 6 due to problems with Disney.

In Australia, Digimon: Digital Monsters' first and second seasons were re-released by Madman Entertainment on August 17, 2011. In addition, the first five series was released on DVD in North America through New Video.

=== DVD releases by North Video ===
The most prolific DVD distributor of Saban Entertainment series in English was Czech studio North Video, s.r.o. (stylized as "NORTH VIDEO"). Located in Ústí nad Labem, this studio was originally founded as a VHS distributor in 1992, continuing a legacy of phonograph record pressing from the early 20th century, but started shifting to CD and DVD distribution in 2002, and expanded to serve other European countries. In 2007, North Video had introduced a specialized form of DVD distribution: slim paper packaging, specifically made to be affordably sold with newspapers at newsstands in both Czechia and Slovakia. The company enjoyed great success for years, but by 2023 it was unofficially defunct due to declining interest in physical media releases.

In 2010, the company licensed and released a large number of DVD volumes of Saban series for distribution in the aforementioned newsstand format. Some of these may have no other DVD releases at all, while others have scattered releases generally in Europe but without English audio, and/or only a limited number of episodes released. North Video followed a consistent format: individual volumes (later resold as bundles) with either 3 or 4 episodes each, with Czech packaging and menus but always including both Czech and original English audio and the original video (with English-language text), and always following the original production order from the beginning of the series, sometimes ultimately incomplete but never skipping episodes.

North Video also released Marvel Studios series, as well as later titles from Jetix including Captain Flamingo, Monster Warriors, Pucca, and Sonic X.

Saban Entertainment DVD releases by North Video
Series	Episodes	Volumes	First release	Last release
Diabolik	40 (all)	12	May 10, 2010	August 2, 2010
Eek! The Cat	39	12	June 25, 2010	September 17, 2010
NASCAR Racers	26 (all)	8	March 9, 2010	June 1, 2010
Princess Sissi	52 (all)	16	June 4, 2010	December 18, 2010
Saban's Adventures of Oliver Twist	18	6	September 24, 2010	October 29, 2010
Saban's Adventures of the Little Mermaid	18	6	March 26, 2010	April 30, 2010
The New Addams Family	39	12	February 15, 2010	May 3, 2010
The Why Why Family	26 (all)	8	September 2, 2010	October 21, 2010
What's with Andy?	33	10	April 13, 2010	July 15, 2010

== Library status ==
=== Program library ===
In 1996, the company had a library of more than 3,700 half-hours of children's programming, making it one of the largest in the world. By the time they were sold to Disney in 2001, their library had increased to over 6,500 half-hours of children's programing.

With a few exceptions, the programs produced and/or distributed by BVS Entertainment and its subsidiaries are currently owned by The Walt Disney Company, and distributed by Disney Platform Distribution.

=== Music library ===
Saban's music library consisted of roughly 3,800 songs, themes and musical underscores, with this number taking into account music that Shuki Levy and Haim Saban produced together in the 1980s for non-Saban Entertainment shows, like He-Man and the Masters of the Universe. Nearly all of these compositions are listed on legal cue sheets as being written by Shuki Levy and Haim Saban, with these two also appearing in television credits as the composers for most Saban-related productions. Starting in the 1990s, Haim Saban started using the pseudonym "Kussa Mahchi" for his musical credits, with spellings varying (for example, on Dragon Ball Z's credits it was spelt "Kussa Mahehi"). For shows produced by Saban International Paris, he used the pseudonym "Michel Dax" beginning in the mid-1990s. Princess Tenko is an exception as it was not produced by SIP, although Haim Saban still composed the musics for the show under this pseudonym. "Michel Dax" is listed in television credits as the sole composer on all programs where this pseudonym is used, although Shuki Levy is still credited as being a co-writer on the cue sheets.

A 1998 investigation by The Hollywood Reporter alleged that during the 1990s, many television compositions credited to Levy and Saban were being ghostwritten by a salaried staff who did not receive royalties. This practice was legal since the musicians signed a contract agreeing to give up the rights to their compositions prior to joining. Feature films produced by Saban Entertainment usually had to give proper credit to these ghostwriters, presumably since they were union productions. Levy and Saban aren't included as composers in the credit sequences of films where the ghostwriters had to be acknowledged, however, they are still present on the cue sheets for most of these films. Compositions which are believed to have been created by ghostwriters, including Ron Wasserman's theme for X-Men: The Animated Series, remain credited to Shuki Levy and Haim Saban whenever they are licensed to appear in other media, such as Doctor Strange in the Multiverse of Madness and X-Men '97 (which use the X-Men theme).

Some of this music library is believed to have gotten misplaced when Disney purchased Saban in 2001. In 2010, Haim Saban sold the music library to independent Los Angeles label Bug Music, who in turn sold it to BMG in 2011.
