= Little Shop =

American animated TV series

- Based on: The Little Shop of Horrors by Charles B. Griffith
- Developed by: Mark Edward Edens; Ellen Levy
- Starring: Marlow Vella; Tamar Lee; Harvey Atkin; Buddy Lewis; David Huband
- Composers: Haim Saban; Shuki Levy
- Countries of origin: United States; France
- No. of seasons: 1
- No. of episodes: 13

Production
- Executive producers: Haim Saban; Joe Taritero
- Producer: Tom Tataranowicz
- Running time: 20 minutes
- Production companies: Marvel Productions; Saban Entertainment; Saban International N.V.; BIL Participations S.A.; Gorfy Corporation N.V.; Fox Children's Productions; Créativité et Développement

Original release
- Network: Fox Kids (United States); La Cinq (France)
- Release: September 7 – November 30, 1991

Little Shop is a 1991 animated musical fantasy comedy television series that aired on Saturday mornings on the Fox Kids TV network, about a teenage boy and his giant talking plant. Based on Roger Corman's 1960 comedy horror film The Little Shop of Horrors as well as incorporating elements of the Off-Broadway musical of the same name and the Frank Oz film of the same name, the concept is credited to Ellen Levy and Mark Edward Edens, and the series was produced by Tom Tataranowicz, with Corman as a consultant. The horror elements in previous versions of the story, in which characters are eaten by the plant, are toned down for children in this series.

Ownership of the series passed to Disney in 2001 when Disney acquired Fox Kids Worldwide, which also includes Marvel Productions.

== Synopsis ==
Self-proclaimed nerd Seymour Krelborn, an adolescent boy who works in a flower shop within Skid row, is friends with a talking Venus flytrap named Junior. Junior sprouts from a 200-million-year-old seed and has the ability to talk and hypnotize people. Only Seymour is aware of Junior's abilities. The flower shop is owned by the stodgy Mr. Mushnik, whose daughter Audrey is the object of Seymour's affections. Audrey, however, is unaware of Seymour's feelings towards her. Buck-toothed neighborhood bully Paine Driller, continuously targets Seymour. Contemporary news sources suggest that a character named "Dr. Toxic" was meant to be a main antagonist, but the character does not appear in any episodes.

Episodes focus on the pubescent exploits of the leads and frequently feature a moral. They also feature at least two musical numbers per episode. Consistent with the "urban" persona of the plant in the musical, Audrey Junior raps in the series during his numbers and speaks in a hip-hop dialect. Also featured are a trio of singing flowers reminiscent of Crystal, Ronette, and Chiffon (the three chorus girls in the musical).

== Differences between the film and series ==
There are differences between the films and this show:

- Each episode features a musical segment.
- The young human characters are thirteen years old and in junior high.
- Junior is significantly more friendly and well-intentioned than his counterparts in either the 1960 movie or the musical (though he is still somewhat rude and abrasive at times), and was reanimated from a prehistoric Earth seed that was dormant for over 200 million years, rather than being extraterrestrial in origin.
- Although Junior maintains a voracious appetite, this iteration very rarely (and only offscreen) feasts on human blood. Junior retains his ability to hypnotize people, as in the film, as well as the ability to telekinetically manipulate plants and objects made from plant-based materials. Junior sometimes aids Seymour without his knowledge, sometimes by using his hypnotic abilities, and will occasionally insult Seymour.
- Like the Roger Corman film, Seymour lives with his mother who is absent from the musical adaptions.
- Audrey, Seymour's love interest, is a bow-wearing brunette who is always thinking about what job she wants when she grows up. She is Mr. Mushnik's daughter in this adaptation.
- Brace-faced neighborhood bully Paine Driller replaces the character of Orin Scrivello, the sadistic dentist from the musical.

== Episodes ==
No.	Title	Written by	Original release date
1	"Bad Seed"	Mark Edward Edens	September 7, 1991
Seymour finds a seed from 200 million years in the past and helps it grow into the plant known as Junior. The plant tries to return home but, upon finding that he cannot, chooses to stay with Seymour and helps Mr. Mushnik's flowers grow.
2	"Real Men Aren't Made of Quiche"	Mark Edward Edens	September 14, 1991
Seymour joins a home economics class where he and Junior conspire to make a human–frozen vegetable hybrid a la Frankenstein. Meanwhile, Audrey decides she wants to be a refrigerator repairman.
3	"Back to the Fuchsia"	Mel Gilden	September 21, 1991
A trip to the Skid Row Museum of Uninteresting History inspires Junior to travel back in time to warn plants about the rise of the dinosaurs and keep his place in the food chain.
4	"Unfair Science"	Mark Edward Edens	September 28, 1991
Seymour's science project, made by Junior, wins a science fair and attention from Seymour's favorite celebrity. However, a scientist wants to steal Seymour's project and use it for himself.
5	"Stage Blight"	Robert Tarlow	October 5, 1991
Failed playwright Thespian Chinless produces Junior's play Flower Town and Seymour finds himself as the romantic lead. Meanwhile, Mr. Mushnik becomes a stage-dad.
6	"I Loathe a Parade"	Marty Isenberg & Robert N. Skir	October 12, 1991
Seymour brings home a female Venus flytrap which Junior falls in love with.
7	"Air Junior"	Marty Isenberg & Robert N. Skir	October 19, 1991
Junior persuades Seymour to buy a new pair of shoes and makes them fly.
8	"Untitled Halloween Story"	Steve Cuden	October 26, 1991
Infuriated by the tradition of jack-o-lantern carving, Junior joins Seymour and Audrey's trick-or-treating to steal them back via his vegetable-magnetism abilities.
9	"It's a Wonderful Leaf"	Jean Chalopin	November 2, 1991
A Grim Reaper shows Seymour a future where the Mushniks own a yogurt shop, Paine is winning awards, and Seymour is a politician. Meanwhile, Junior dreams that he runs a hotel for flowers.
10	"Tooth or Consequences"	Barbara Slade	November 9, 1991
Seymour and Junior learn the hard way about lies when Mrs. Krelborn's low-fat ice cream disappears.
11	"Walk Like a Nerd"	Barbara Slade	November 16, 1991
Weary of the limitations that come with having roots, Junior tries to give himself legs and inadvertently winds up sharing a body with Seymour.
12	"Pulp Fiction"	Matthew Malach	November 23, 1991
Junior watches in horror as the oldest tree in the world is turned into paper and leads a revolt composed of used paper products that swamps Skid Row.
13	"Married to the Mush"	Hope Juber	November 30, 1991
Paine's aunt starts to date Mr. Mushnik under the delusion that he is wealthy. Dismayed, the usually career-oriented Audrey expresses a desire to become a housewife.

== Cast ==
- Marlow Vella as Seymour Krelborn
  - Lisa Paulette (Note: First three episodes) and Jana Lexxa (Note: Rest of series) as Seymour's singing voice
- Tamar Lee as Audrey Mushnik
  - Jennie Kwan as Audrey's singing voice
- Harvey Atkin as Mr. Mushnik
  - Michael Rawl as Mr. Mushnik's singing voice
- Buddy Lewis as Junior
  - Terry "Proffet" McGee as Junior's singing voice
- David Huband as Paine Driller
  - Mark Ryan-Martin as Paine's singing voice

=== Additional voices ===
- Tara Charendoff
- Don Francks
- Dan Hennessey
- Rick Jones
- Tracey Moore
- Stephen Ouimette
- Ron Rubin
- Linda Sorenson
- Robert Tinkler
- Danny Wells

== Crew ==
- Roger Corman – Creative Consultant
- Stu Rosen – Voice Director
- Jamie Simone – Dialogue Editor
