= Happy Ness: The Secret of the Loch =

- Genre: Animation
- Created by: Anthony Gentile and John Gentile
- Written by: Jean Chalopin
- Directed by: Xavier Giacometti
- Voices of: John Brewster; Dan Conroy; Donna Daley; Eddie Korbich Jr.; Connor Matthews; Kathryn Zar
- Countries of origin: United States; France
- Original language: English
- No. of seasons: 1
- No. of episodes: 13

Production
- Running time: 22 min
- Production companies: Abrams/Gentile Entertainment; Créativité et Développement; AB Productions

Original release
- Network: Syndication
- Release: September 9 – December 2, 1995

Happy Ness: The Secret of the Loch is an American and French children's animated series that aired in 1995, centering on a community of Loch Ness monsters that can fly and swim. It lasted 13 episodes, but also airing in Sweden and other countries on Fox Kids and Fox Kids Play. It was co-produced by Abrams Gentile Entertainment, C&D (Créativité et Développement; the same company who produced The Bots Master), and AB Productions. In the United States, it was syndicated by Active Entertainment. It was the last series to be produced by C&D before it was sold and absorbed into Saban International Paris in 1996.

== Episodes ==
No.	Title	Original release date
1	"There's a World of Nessies"	9 September 1995
2	"Circle of De-light"	8 September 1995
3	"A Surprise for Sir Prize"	15 September 1995
4	"It's Not Bad to Be Sad"	22 September 1995
5	"No Time for Silly Ness"	29 September 1995
6	"S.U.R.F.'s Up"	6 October 1995
7	"Courageous Outrageous"	TBA
8	"Money Can't Buy Happyness"	20 October 1995
9	"Time Is of the Nessence"	27 October 1995
10	"Jewel of the Pool"	3 November 1995
11	"Sneak Attack"	10 November 1995
12	"Stand Tall, No Matter How Big or Small"	17 November 1995
13	"Spread a Little Happy Ness"	24 November 1995

== Home media ==
Happy Ness: The Secret of the Loch was first released on VHS in 1996 by Just for Kids Home Video formally known as Celebrity Home Entertainment, shortly before the video production company ended in 1997. Nine episodes of the series were released on VHS between 1996 and 1997.

VHS releases:

Happy Ness: The Secret of the Loch - Vol 1

Episodes:

- There's a World of Nessies
- A Surprise for Sir Prize
- It's Not Bad to Be Sad
- Money Can't Buy Happyness
- Stand Tall, No Matter How Big or Small

Happy Ness: The Secret of the Loch - Vol 2

Episodes:

- Circle of De-light
- No Time for Silly Ness
- S.U.R.F.'s Up
- Courageous Outrageous
