= Space Strikers =

- Written by: Jean Chalopin; Ted Pedersen
- Directed by: Bruno Bianchi; Tom McLaughlin
- Creative director: Choi An Hee
- Theme music composer: Shuki Levy; Haim Saban
- Composer: Michel Dax
- Countries of origin: France; United States
- Original languages: French; English
- No. of seasons: 1
- No. of episodes: 26 (13 in the U.S.)

Production
- Executive producers: Vincent Chalvon-Demersay; Jacqueline Tordjman
- Producers: Dana C. Booton; Jean Chalopin; Sam Ewing; Eric S. Rollman
- Editors: Shuichi Kakesu; Michel LeFrançois; Nathalie LeGuay
- Running time: 30 min.
- Production companies: Saban Entertainment; Saban International Paris

Original release
- Network: M6 (France); UPN (United States)
- Release: September 10 – December 3, 1995

Space Strikers (French: 20,000 Lieues dans l'espace, lit 20,000 Leagues in Space) is a 1995 animated television series based on the 1870 Jules Verne novel Twenty Thousand Leagues Under the Seas. Episodes center around the crew of the spaceship Nautilus, led by Captain Nemo, in an attempt to liberate Earth and other planets from the control of Master Phantom. The series later premiered in France on M6 on March 8, 1995 and later aired in the United States on UPN from September 10 to December 3, 1995. Action sequences were shown in "Strikervision" 3D.

Ownership of the series passed to Disney in 2001 when Disney acquired Fox Kids Worldwide, which also includes Saban Entertainment.

== Plot ==
Space Strikers has a single continuous plot running through all twelve episodes. In the Future the universe is inhabited by humans and a variety of other spacefaring species. They are under threat from the mostly-robotic armies of Master Phantom, a human cyborg who was once Vince Burt who blames Captain Nemo left him for dead and vows revenge. Now Earth and multiple other planets have already been conquered at the start of the first episode. Members of various other species join the human crew of the Nautilus to fight back, including an anthropomorphic wolf, an anthropomorphic dolphin, a Cupid-like creature, and a variety of robots.

Due to their previous friendship and shared academy training, Captain Nemo and Master Phantom attempting to outwit each other is recurrent theme in the show.

== Strikervision ==
At various times in an episode, a small green icon appears in the corner of the screen to alert the viewer to put on 3D glasses. Early 3D sequences typically feature repeated background and foreground images moving in opposite directions over the characters or ships on screen, giving the illusion of rotation or movement. Later instances of 3D imagery often show spaceships flying past the screen, made possible by the show's use of 3D computer graphics for many of its spacecraft.

== Voice cast ==
- Norman Blackmore
- Les Doolan as Dacar
- Jimmy Flinders - Captain Nemo
- HF Guilford
- Orville Ketchum as Admiral Maalko
- Ruth Lazar
- Kellie O'Connell
- Harry Pitts
- Nick Scott
- Reed Waxman

Uncredited

- Mary Kay Bergman
- Richard Epcar

== Music ==
In addition to Ron Wasserman composing original music for this series, Shuki Levy also co-composed for this series, recycling some of the music from Starcom: The U.S. Space Force which he would later reuse for the English dub version of Season 1 of Digimon Adventure.

== Episodes ==
No.	Title	Original release date
1	"Best of Friends, Worst of Enemies"	September 10, 1995
2	"Cash for Merchandise"	September 17, 1995
3	"Victory's Gift"	September 24, 1995
4	"The Second Wave"	October 1, 1995
5	"The Surrender"	October 8, 1995
6	"In the Shadow of the Wolf"	October 15, 1995
7	"Mission to Joncar"	October 22, 1995
8	"Mission of Mercy"	October 29, 1995
9	"A Taste of His Own Medicine"	November 5, 1995
10	"The Bargain"	November 12, 1995
11	"The Dark Stone"	November 19, 1995
12	"Mission to Earth"	November 26, 1995
13	"The Green Dragon"	December 3, 1995
