= Saban's Adventures of the Little Mermaid =

1991 TV anime

- Opening titles
- Also known as: The Adventures of the Little Mermaid
- 人魚姫マリーナの冒険
- Genre: Fantasy, adventure, romance
- Created by: Jean Chalopin
- Based on: "The Little Mermaid" by Hans Christian Andersen
- Written by: Jean Chalopin (eps 1–26)
- Directed by: Takehiro Miyano
- Countries of origin: Japan; France
- No. of seasons: 1
- No. of episodes: 26

Production
- Animators: Telescreen Japan; Jupiter Films
- Running time: 25 mins.
- Production companies: Saban International Paris; Hexatel; Fuji Eight

Original release
- Network: FNS (Fuji TV) (Japan); Antenne 2 (France)
- Release: 2 February – 27 July 1991

Saban's Adventures of the Little Mermaid (人魚姫マリーナの冒険, Ningyo-hime Marīna no Bōken; lit. 'The Adventures of Mermaid Princess Marina'; French: Le Prince et la Sirène, lit. 'The Prince and the Mermaid') is a French-Japanese animated series produced by Fuji Television and Saban International Paris and animated by Telescreen Japan in the early 1990s, based on the 1837 Hans Christian Andersen fairy tale "The Little Mermaid".

This 26-episode TV series was originally created by Jean Chalopin and directed by Takehiro Miyano. The series was broadcast on Japan's Fuji TV network from February to July 1991. As in the 1975 feature-length film version produced by Toei Animation, Hans Christian Andersen's The Little Mermaid (with which this series may be confused), the mermaid protagonist was drawn as a blonde in this version and given the name Marina. It also added a new ingredient to the story: a magic potion given to the prince which he could use to breathe underwater and be with Marina.

The show was released in the United States for Saturday morning and weekday afternoon syndication by Saban Entertainment in association with USA syndicator Bohbot Entertainment in the summer of 1991, intended to capitalize on the success of the Disney film adaptation of the same story. Disney coincidentally released their own TV series adaptation, which did far better than Saban's in the ratings. The show was also aired in Canada on YTV.

Ownership of the series passed to Disney in 2001 when Disney acquired Fox Kids Worldwide, which also includes Saban Entertainment.

== Plot ==
Marina is a mermaid who is in love with Prince Justin, a human prince from a kingdom on the shore. Marina saves Justin when he almost drowns after a chase from a giant Cyclops and a shipwreck attack from a three-headed sea serpent. She then makes a deal with Hedwig the sea witch to become human temporarily to try to win Justin's love. Justin and Marina become close but Justin thinks that Princess Cecily, a human princess, was the one who saved him from drowning and therefore he gets engaged to her. Justin eventually remembers that Marina was the one who saved his life but by then Marina becomes a mermaid again. The two continue to secretly meet and try to find a way to be together while dealing with Hedwig's plans to take over the kingdom and Cecily's attempts to get Justin to marry her. Marina and Justin are aided by their underwater friends Winnie the seahorse, Bobo the tropical fish, and Ridley the sea otter. They are also aided by the wizard Anselm and by Justin's page Chauncey.

== Characters ==
=== Main ===
- Marina (voiced by Sonja Ball) is a mermaid with waist-length golden blonde hair and green tail who is the protagonist of the show. After she saves Prince Justin of Gandor, she falls in love with him and wishes to become human. She is not the same Marina from the 1975 film.
- Prince Justin (voiced by Thor Bishopric) – Prince of Gandor and Marina's boyfriend.
- Winnie (voiced by Anik Matern) is Marina's seahorse friend and constant companion. Unlike real world seahorses, she has the ability to scream at very high pitches which causes people to pass out. She also has the ability to fly when she is out of water.
- Bobo (voiced by Carlyle Miller) is Marina's tropical fish friend. He often spies on Hedwig and reports back to Marina and the rest of the gang.
- Ridley (voiced by Arthur Holden) is Marina's sea otter friend and Anselm's companion. Unlike real world sea otters, he seems to be able to breathe under water indefinitely. He's also rather small for a sea otter, though he could just be young.
- Anselm (voiced by Aron Tager) is Prince Justin's tutor and secretly a wizard who was once in love with Hedwig in their youth. He helps Prince Justin and Marina out where he provides a potion to help Prince Justin temporarily breathe underwater and Marina to briefly become human.
- Chauncey (voiced by Gordon Masten) is Prince Justin's short, goofy, and loyal page.

=== Antagonists ===
- Hedwig (voiced by Sonja Ball) is a sea witch who acts as the main antagonist of the show. She was once a sorceress who was in love with Anselm until her hunger for power forced him to banish her to the sea. She comes up with plot after plot to capture Marina and Justin so she can exchange them for the Amulet of Power which would make her the most powerful person on both land and water and therefore rule the world. Just like a mermaid, she doesn't have legs and her tail resembles that of a moray eel. The power that she uses most often is to release prehensile vines from her long fingernails.
  - Dudley (voiced by Ian Finlay) is a half-witted Great hammerhead who is Hedgwig's second-in-command. His role is a lot more prominent than the other henchmen of Hedwig and he serves as the comic relief among the antagonists.
  - Ray is a Giant oceanic manta ray who acts as Hedgwig's mode of transportation and spy. He is heard speaking sometimes. Other times, he is shown to only be able to mumble (though Hedwig can understand him even then). It's not clear what his name is as Hedwig once calls him Ray and another time she calls him Manta.
  - Hugo is a Giant Pacific octopus who acts as Hedgwig's muscle.
  - Barracudas & Tiger sharks – Hedwig's army.
- Cecily is a mean aristocratic girl who likes Prince Justin even though he doesn't reciprocate her feelings. She was his promised bride before he met Marina. Her father is Lord Ainsworth.
- Prince Lothar (voiced by Richard Dumont) – Prince of Brakston (Gandor's enemy country) and Justin's sworn enemy and rival. He often cooperates with Hedwig to take Marina for marriage.

=== Supporting ===
- Barnabas is Marina's younger brother (cousin in the English dub). He is a very good inventor and his tail is blue.
- Coral is Marina's bossy older sister. Her tail is pink.
- King Nestor - King of the world's oceans. King Nestor is extremely strong as can be seen when he easily beats Hugo with his bare hands. His tail is dark blue.
- Queen Serena is Marina's grandmother, an elderly mermaid who lives in the same castle as Marina. She is seen briefly in two episodes and her voice can be heard in another one.
- King Charles (voiced by A. J. Henderson) is Prince Justin's father.
- Queen Catherine (voiced by Kathleen Fee) is Prince Justin's mother. She is very interested in her son's love life and tries to act as his matchmaker.
- Orcus is a whale who helps Marina and her friends a few times.

== Episodes ==
1. Return to the Sea
2. In the Wrong Hands
3. Water Water Everywhere
4. A Leopard and Her Spots
5. Lothar's Revenge
6. What's Cookin'?
7. Be Careful What You Wish
8. Safe Deposit
9. A Day In the Country
10. Sugar and Spice
11. A Friend Indeed
12. Song of the Sea Witch
13. The Valley of the Volcanoes
14. Quest for the Golden Tablet
15. A Case of Mistaken Identity
16. Beauty and the Beastly Prince
17. A Man's Beast Friend Is His Dogfish
18. A Mortal In Mermaid's Clothing
19. Nature Hike
20. My Bonnie Lies Under the Sea
21. The Trojan Seahorse
22. A Rose By Any Other Name
23. X Marks the Spot
24. One Man's Bread Is Another Man's Poison
25. Hold That Thought
26. Waste Not, Want Not

== Music ==
The series uses two pieces of theme music for the original Japanese version. The opening theme is called "Yumemiru Mermaid (夢みるMERMAID lit. Dreaming Mermaid)" and the ending theme is called "Pearl-no Kimochi (パールな気持ち lit. Pearl Feelings)", both by vocalist Yumi Hiroki, who also portrayed the voice of Winnie in the Japanese version of the show. Rachelle Cano performs the theme music for the English dub version.

== Home media ==
As with many other Saban Entertainment series, the only major English-language DVD release is by Czech distributor North Video, featuring both Czech and English audio and original video (with English-language text) in the original production order. The first 18 episodes were released on 6 volumes, from March 26 to April 30, 2010.
