= Jean Chalopin =

French producer and writer

- Born: 31 May 1950 (age 76); Sannois, France
- Occupations: Banker, television producer, media proprietor, screenwriter
- Years active: 1971–present
- Spouse: Ethel Fong (1998–present)
- Children: 2

Jean Chalopin (French pronunciation: [ʒɑ̃ ʃalɔpɛ̃]; born 31 May 1950) is a French businessman, banker and former television animation producer. In 1971, he founded the production company DIC Entertainment, which specialized in children-oriented animated television and film productions. Through DIC he produced numerous successful television series, including Inspector Gadget, which he also co-created (and which grew into a namesake media franchise), The Real Ghostbusters, The Littles and Dennis the Menace. Chalopin also co-wrote DIC's first two major productions, Ulysses 31 and The Mysterious Cities of Gold. After selling off his ownership in DIC, he founded a second company, C&D, in 1987, through which he continued to produce cartoons until its closure in 1996. Chalopin remained active as a writer, producer and creative consultant in the years to follow. More recently, however, he has shifted his focus onto a career in banking.

== Career ==
=== Production ===
In 1968, Chalopin formed an advertising company named the Office de Gestion et d'Action Publicitaire (OGAP, Office of Management and Advertising Action). In 1971, with the backing of the Compagnie Luxembourgeoise de Télédiffusion, Chalopin renamed the company to Diffusion Information Commercial (DIC, Commercial Information Distribution) which later evolved into DIC Entertainment. At DIC, he wrote, developed and produced programmes animated by overseas studios. DIC's first major series were the French-Japanese co-productions Ulysses 31 and The Mysterious Cities of Gold, which Chalopin produced and co-wrote. Subsequently, he co-created Inspector Gadget together with Andy Heyward and Bruno Bianchi; its launch in 1983, concurrently with The Littles, marked DIC's foray into the American marketplace.

In 1987, Chalopin founded the company Créativité et Développement, aka C&D (eng: Creativity and Development), after selling his shares in DIC, and continued to produce cartoons in the late 1980s and 1990s. C&D had offices in Paris and Tokyo while setting up Jetlag Productions as its American affiliated company. C&D had purchased the DIC library foreign distribution rights from Saban Entertainment soon after Saban had acquired them from DIC in 1987. In 1996, Chalopin sold the C&D library to Fox Kids Worldwide, while the company itself was absorbed into Saban International Paris.

=== Banking ===
After moving to the Bahamas in 1987, Chalopin began investing in Deltec Bank and Trust, eventually becoming its largest shareholder. In 2010, Chalopin became chairman of Deltec Bank and Trust and parent company Deltec International Group. As chairman he sought out cryptocurrency-related businesses, including Tether and its controlling company Bitfinex in 2018. At that time, Deltec was the only bank willing to work with the cryptocurrency, after it and Bitfinex lost their relationship with their Taiwanese banks in early 2017.

In 2020 Chalopin acquired Farmington State Bank (FSB), a single-location community bank in Farmington, Washington, through a holding company for $3.1 million. FSB, which until then had focused on agricultural loans, began to offer services to the blockchain and cannabis industries under the name Moonstone Bank. Among its blockchain-related activities were multi-million dollar transactions involving Deltec and entities associated with the FTX cryptocurrency exchange. In early 2023, after FTX's failure, more than $62 million in FTX-related funds were taken from FSB and its holding company through federal seizure and voluntary restitution. FSB subsequently sold its operations and wound down at the insistence of the Federal Reserve and state regulators for changing its business model without authorization.

== Producer ==
=== Television ===
- Ulysses 31 (1981–1982)
- The Mysterious Cities of Gold (1982–1983)
- Inspector Gadget (1983–1985)
- The Littles (1983–1985)
- Kidd Video (1984)
- The Get Along Gang (1984)
- Pole Position (1984)
- Heathcliff (1984–1985)
- Rainbow Brite (1984–1986)
- Care Bears (1985)
- Hulk Hogan's Rock 'n' Wrestling (1985–1986)
- Jayce and the Wheeled Warriors (1985–1986)
- M.A.S.K. (1985–1986)
- Photon (1986–1987)
- Popples (1986–1987)
- The Adventures of Teddy Ruxpin (1986–1987)
- Zoobilee Zoo (1986–1987)
- Dennis the Menace (1986–1988)
- Kissyfur (1986–1990)
- The Real Ghostbusters (1986–1991)
- The New Adventures of He-Man (1990)
- The Twins of Destiny (1991–1992)
- King Arthur and the Knights of Justice (1992–1993)
- The Adventures of T-Rex (1992–1993)
- Conan the Adventurer (1993)
- The Bots Master (1993–1994)
- Littlest Pet Shop (1995)
- Space Strikers (1995)

=== Film ===
- Here Come the Littles (1985)
- Rainbow Brite and the Star Stealer (1985)
- Heathcliff: The Movie (1986)
- Liberty (1986)
- The Kingdom Chums: Little David's Adventure (1986)

== Screenwriting credits ==
=== Television ===
- Ulysses 31 (1981–1982)
- The Mysterious Cities of Gold (1982–1983)
- Pole Position (1984)
- Jayce and the Wheeled Warriors (1985–1986)
- The New Adventures of He-Man (1990)
- Saban's Adventures of the Little Mermaid (1991)
- The Twins of Destiny (1991–1992)
- The Adventures of T-Rex (1992–1993)
- Around the World in Eighty Dreams (1992)
- King Arthur and the Knights of Justice (1992–1993)
- Conan the Adventurer (1993)
- The Bots Master (1993–1994)
- Happy Ness: The Secret of the Loch (1995)
- Space Strikers (1995)
- Littlest Pet Shop (1995)
- Gadget & the Gadgetinis (2002–2003)
- Sabrina's Secret Life (2003–2004)
- The Mysterious Cities of Gold (2012–2013, licensed)

=== Film ===
- Rainbow Brite and the Star Stealer (1985)

== Personal life ==
Chalopin is married to Singaporean former model Ethel Fong Sau Yee, who he married in 1998 in Château de Farcheville. Chalopin owned the castle from 1989 to 2006 before selling it. They have a son, Janvier, and a daughter, Tanis.
