= Créativité et Développement =

French television production company

- Industry: Animation
- Predecessor: DIC Audiovisuel
- Founded: 1987; 39 years ago
- Founder: Jean Chalopin
- Defunct: 21 December 1998; 27 years ago
- Fate: Acquired by and folded into Saban Entertainment
- Successor: Saban International Paris
- Headquarters: France
- Products: Children's television shows
- Parent: Saban International Paris (1996–1998)
- Subsidiaries: K.K. C&D Asia

Créativité et Développement or C&D was a French animation studio founded in 1987 by Jean Chalopin. Chalopin had retained some of the assets of DIC Enterprises (which also includes the earliest animated series) in the sale to Andy Heyward and Bear Stern, these assets (notably the animation studio that had been established in Japan) where expanded into the new company. In April 1996, Chalopin sold the company, including its library (and the animation rights to Diabolik) to Saban International Paris (later renamed SIP Animation from 2002 to 2023), the latter being folded on October 24, 2001 into The Walt Disney Company through BVS Entertainment. In 2000, following the closure of Créativité et Développement and the company was folded into Saban Entertainment, as well as the lack of any Japanese content produced by the studio following a new law, K.K. C&D Asia was closed. Most of the K.K. C&D Asia employees now work for Production I.G.

== Filmography ==
=== Television series ===
Title	Year(s)	Co-production(s)	Network
La Lucarne d'Amilcar	1987–89	DIC Audiovisuel	RTL Télé Lëtzebuerg; M6
Diplodo	1988	Bandai	FR3
Lisa or the Olympic dream	1988	KBS (Korean)	Antenne 2 KBS (Korean)
The New Adventures of He-Man	1990	Jetlag Productions; Parafrance Communication, S.A. Mattel	Syndication
Sophie & Virginie	1990–93	AB Productions; CNC	TF1; ABC (Australia)
Michel Vaillant (Heroes On Hot Wheels)	1991	Jetlag Productions; Jingle; HIT Entertainment; CNC	The Family Channel; La Cinq
Adventures of the Little Mermaid	1991	Saban Entertainment (Note: and Saban International Paris.); Hexatel; Fuji Eight Co., Ltd. FCI; Mitsui & Co.	Fuji TV; Antenne 2
Little Shop	1991	Marvel Productions; Saban Entertainment (Note: and Saban International Paris.); Fox Children's Productions	Fox Kids; La Cinq
Cupido	1991–92	AB Productions; CNC	Antenne 2
The Twins of Destiny	1991–93	AB Productions; CNC	TF1; ABC (Australia)
The Adventures of T-Rex	1992	Kitty Films; Gunther-Wahl Productions; AB Productions	Syndication; TF1 (France)
King Arthur and the Knights of Justice	1992–93	Bohbot Entertainment; Golden Films; AB Productions; CNC	Syndication; TF1 (France)
Around the World in Eighty Dreams	1992–93	Saban Entertainment (Note: and Saban International N.V., Saban International Paris.); CNC; Sei Young (animation)	Syndication; Canal+/TF1 (France); MBC (Korean)
Conan the Adventurer (Season 2)	1993	Sunbow Productions; AB Productions; CNC; AKOM (animation)	Syndication; M6
The Bots Master	1993	Avi Arad & Associates; AB Productions; CNC	Syndication; TF1 & Mangas; ABC (Australia)
Happy Ness: Secret of the Loch	1995	Abrams/Gentile Entertainment; AB Productions; CNC	Syndication
Littlest Pet Shop	1995	Sunbow Entertainment; AB Productions; CNC	Syndication; M6

=== TV specials ===
Title	Year	Co-production(s)
Magic Trolls and the Troll Warriors	1992	Bohbot Entertainment; Avi Arad & Associates

== Legacy and subsequent ownership ==
A sizeable portion of the Créativité et Développement content library is currently owned by The Walt Disney Company, which purchased Saban Entertainment (renamed to BVS Entertainment) and Saban International Paris (renamed to SIP Animation from 2002 to 2023) in 2001. Mediawan Thematics currently owns the C&D programs co-produced with AB Productions. The New Adventures of He-Man was placed within Parafrance Communication's Filmation library, which is currently owned by DreamWorks Animation. King Arthur and the Knights of Justice is currently distributed by Invincible Entertainment under license from 41 Entertainment, and Magic Trolls and the Troll Warriors is currently owned by Arad Productions.
