= Saban's Around the World in Eighty Dreams =

1992 French TV series or program

- Written by: Alain Garcia; Jean Cheville
- Directed by: Bruno Bianchi
- Composers: Haim Saban; Shuki Levy
- Country of origin: France
- Original language: French
- No. of seasons: 1
- No. of episodes: 26

Production
- Executive producers: Winston Richard; Jacqueline Tordjman; Vincent Chalvon-Demersay
- Producer: Eric S. Rollman
- Running time: 30 minutes
- Production company: Saban International Paris

Original release
- Network: Canal+
- Release: November 13, 1992 – 1993

Saban's Around the World in Eighty Dreams (French: Les Aventures de Carlos) is a French animated series that first premiered on Canal+ on November 13, 1992, and later aired on TF1 in December 1993.

A co-production between Saban International Paris and TF1, with the participation of Canal+ and the CNC, the series focuses on Carlos (based on Carlos Dolto, a French singer and celebrity) and his parrot Oscar, and three adopted children who live on Carlos' own tropical Island. Carlos loves to tell the children stories about how he met world famous important figures in history in spite of the children's disbelief. With the help of Grandma Tadpole, who lives on one of the beaches of the island, he travels back in time together with the children in order to prove to them that he is right. Carlos has the ability to transform into an ox when the group is in trouble.

Ownership of the series passed to Disney in 2001 when Disney acquired Fox Kids Worldwide, which also includes Saban Entertainment.

== Characters ==
- Carlos (voiced by himself in the French version, and Mark Camacho in the English dub)
- Mariana/Marianne (voiced by Sylvie Jacob in the French version, and Patricia Rodriguez in the English dub)
- Oscar (voiced by Gérard Surugue in the French version, and Rick Jones in the English dub)
- Mamie Têtard/Grandma Tadpole (voiced by Évelyne Grandjean in the French version, and Rick Jones in the English dub)
- Saitout/Koki (voiced by Adrien Antoine in the French version, and Pauline Little in the English dub)
- A.J. (voiced by Sonja Ball in the English dub)

== Episodes ==
#	English title	French title	Written by (English dub)
1.	Carlos and the Dragon	Carlos et le dragon	Mark Ryan
2.	The Bravest Bull of Them All	Le plus brave d'entre tout les taureaux	Tom Wyner
3		Une baleine de légende	
4.	The Mystery of the Grand Pyramid	Le Mystère de la Pyramide	Tom Wyner
5.		Autour de la Terre avec Carlos	
6.		Le Toit du Monde	
8.	Flight to Fame	Le Vol vers la gloire	Robert V. Barron
9.	The Hunt for Green Mamie	À la recherche de Mamie Tétard	Doug Stone
10.	Friar Carlos and His Merry Men	Frère Carlos et ses joyeux lurons	Robert Axelrod
11.	Journey to the Beginning of Time	Voyage au commencement du temps	Tom Wyner
12.	The Wings of Carlos	Les Ailes de Carlos	Tom Wyner
13.	Circus Carlosus	Le Cirque Carlos	Mark Ryan
14.		Carlos de Troie	
16.		Carlos Corsaire	
17.		King Kong Carlos	
20.	The Longest Jump	Le Grand Saut	Mark Ryan
21.	Kid Carlos	Le Petit Carlos	Tom Wyner
22.	Carlos, Phone Home	Allô Carlos ?	Mark Ryan
23.	The Carlos Encounter	Carlos du 3e type	Tom Wyner

== International airings ==
In 1993, the show was broadcast in the United States in first-run syndication in the early 1990s as part of Bohbot Entertainment's "Amazin' Adventures" package.

== Video game ==
In 1994, a platform video game based on the series was released in France by Microids for the Atari ST, Amiga, and MS-DOS.
