= The Twins of Destiny =

- Genre: Adventure, fantasy, children, historical
- Created by: Jean Chalopin
- Developed by: Jean Chalopin
- Directed by: Pat Griffiths; Jean Morisse
- Opening theme: "Dorothée"
- Countries of origin: France; China; United States; United Kingdom
- Original languages: English; French
- No. of seasons: 1
- No. of episodes: 52

Production
- Running time: 26 minutes
- Production company: C&D (Créativité et Développement)

Original release
- Network: TF1 (France); Australian Broadcasting Corporation (ABC; Australia)

The Twins of Destiny (known as Les Jumeaux du Bout du Monde (The Twins of the Edge of the World) in French, or 天命神童 (Destiny's Children) in Chinese) was a 1991 animated television series produced by French writer Jean Chalopin. It followed the fictional quest of two children, Jules and Julie, in their travels across Eurasia seeking to overthrow the Empress Dowager of China, and consequently, release their fathers from imprisonment. The English dubbed version first aired in Australia on December 27, 1994 on the ABC network. The animation was translated and introduced to China in mid-1990s.

== Story ==
In Shanghai, China, 1895, Two children, Jules (a Chinese boy), and Julie (an English girl) are born on the same night, under the light of a full moon, fulfilling the first part of a prophecy foretold by the soothsayer Lao Tzu. That prophecy describes two children, born to different parents, but in the same place (Shanghai) at the same hour (when the Moon is at its highest point in the night sky) whose mother perishes at birth, which begins the end of the tyrannical rule of Empress Dowager Cixi. In addition, the prophecy also states that in order for this dethronement to occur, "the Twins of Destiny" must replace two stone tablets in the sacred Temple of Heavenly Harmony, in the Forbidden City. As foretold, this would lead to complete collapse of the tyrannical empire in its entirety.

The Dowager Empress is informed of this prophecy from her astrologer, and sends several eunuchs to kill the infants shortly after their birth. Although their fathers are captured, a member of the "Society of Freedom", Shou Cow, rescues the babies and arranges to send them to France via an arrangement made with a Captain Tournier and his first mate Martin Garçon.

Meanwhile, the Dowager Empress imprisons the biological fathers of Jules and Julie, a native of China and a blonde-haired, bearded British man, petrifying them into solid gold stone with the aid of her court magician Ho Cheng. Upon hearing that the Twins have survived, a pirate, Kung Lee, is sent to kill the twins. Although he successfully takes over the ship conveying the newborn twins to Europe, he cannot bring himself to end such innocence and goes to the Empress, with the pretense that he had killed the newborn twin siblings with his sword, and sunk the vessel with everyone on board.

Twelve years later, 1907, The Twins, named Jules and Julie, who have been living in France with Captain Tournier whom they believe to be their father and call him "Papa". At elementary school, Jules is harassed by a bully at this school. At around this point in their lives, the Twins become careless with their power which the Captain has warned them not to use in public. An example of this is when they use a great burst of power just to move a toy boat to the edge of a pond almost breaking the boat. Later on they use their power to throw an apple pie into A bully's face after he steals the pie from Jules. They again use the power of protection to save themselves when they almost crash Martin Garçon's car into a tree thereby almost killing themselves.

Shortly thereafter the Twins, the Captain and Martin Garçon go on a trip to Paris for their auspicious twelfth birthday. The night before the trip, the twins both have a strange dream; two statues warn Jules and Julie not to travel to Paris. Scared, the twins discuss their dream with Captain Tournier, who tells the twins not to worry and that it was just a nightmare. However, a Chinese ambassador becomes aware of the twins presence when they meet at a theatre, and Jules and Julie must escape. A message is immediately sent to China, and the Empress is made aware of the twin's survival. Enraged, she sends her eunuchs to chase down the twins and kill them. Meanwhile, their gardener, Ho Quan, a member of the Society of Freedom, assists them in escaping from the Chinese ambassadors to France. However, Captain Paul Tournier, dies of a heart attack. Martin Garçon is now the legal guardian of the Twins.

Shou Cow makes contact with the Twins, and Jules and Julie are given an explanation to their supernatural abilities. They are finally told of their mission – to travel to Beijing and return the Stone Tablets to the Forbidden City. The Twins then begin to travel across Europe, avoiding capture by the Empire's eunuchs, who by now have arrived in France. The twins first goal is to reach Marseilles in France, where they will meet with Shou Cow and other members of the Society of Freedom who will help them with their journey to China. However, they are separated from Martin, but continue to travel, with their powers slowly growing over time. They eventually meet the Great Sebatier, a traveling magician who helps the Twins evade the eunuchs with his incredibly strong dark magic, and assists them in their passage to Marseilles.

After being imprisoned and forced to work for several days in a sweatshop, Jules and Julie again meet up with Martin. Upon traveling on a ship destined for the Asia, the twins and all aboard are shipwrecked. Upon awakening on a deserted island, the Twins, separated from the other passengers, discover Giovanne, a seemingly supernatural being. He explains that the Twins can learn greater control of their magic by use of the Seven Powers. These Seven Powers allow the Twins to use their magic more powerfully and efficiently.

The twins make their way to Greece. They are separated from Martin at this point and are forced to find passage to Turkey by themselves. In Turkey, Julie is kidnapped and made a member of the harem of a local prince (who is revealed to be about the same age as the twins). Jules, with the help of a traveling Arab caravan, is able to rescue Julie, and the prince and his father are extremely apologetic. As they continue through the desert, they are reacquainted with the Great Sabatier, who sacrifices himself to save the twins' lives from the eunuchs and bandits of the desert. They then journey through Northern India, and then reach the mountains of Tibet, where Julie is severely injured by an enemy's knife wound. The twins spend several days in a Buddhist monastery, where Julie is able to recover. At this point, they are reunited with Martin and Professor Ledeaux, but also meet Ho Cheng, whom the twins are unaware of. Initially presenting himself as a traveler, Ho Cheng, the Magician, tries to kill Jules and Julie. They escape, however the Magician manages to steal the tablets during the struggle. The twins, with their power disabled, carry on with Martin and his party. They discover the tablets may be held by Ho Cheng in a hidden temple. They are ambushed, separated from Martin, and Ho Cheng holds them prisoner. After a violent struggle, they are able to recover the tablets, and battle Ho Cheng in his "chamber". Ho Cheng is revealed to be a demon with the true form of a large brain. Using the Seventh of the Seven Powers, the twins are able to damage the brain. Severely weakened, Ho Cheng tries to kill the twins (who are exhausted from their use of the Seventh Power), but is destroyed by Kung Lee the pirate, who makes a reappearance. The Empress hears of the death of her trusted court magician, and fearful for her safety, increases the palace guard.

The twins finally reach China, and make their way to the capital, Beijing. Upon entering a safe-house run by the Society of Freedom and being reunited with Shou Cow, the twins are given important information; that the voices of the statues they hear in their thoughts and dreams are actually those of their fathers. They make plans with the Society to reach the Gates of the Forbidden City (which has been placed under heavy guard because of the arrival of the twins). As the area is on high alert for the Twins and entrance through the main gate is impossible, they decide to move through the sewers connecting outside of the Forbidden City to the Inside. Unfortunately, during their passage under the city, it begins to rain, flooding the sewers and almost drowning the twins. Using the Third of the Seven Powers, they break the roof, providing them with much needed air. They then use the Sixth Power (stated as Fourth) to raise the water level so they can exit one of the wells and enter the Forbidden City. Entering the Temple of Heavenly Harmony, they almost successfully replace the tablets, but are stopped by a Eunuch, Po Dung. The Society of Freedom launches an attack on the city, and the Empress Dowager flees to the Summer Palace.

Using a scheme involving fireworks and a hot air balloon, the twins enter the temple. Jules places the tablets on the altar, reads the Chinese inscriptions and through a magical force their fathers, who are imprisoned in stone nearby, are freed. Po Dung and the other Eunuchs launch a final attack. Unfortunately for Jules and Julie, their powers start to fade. It becomes clear that the Seven Powers are tied to the Prophecy. Shou Cow explains that since the Prophecy has now been fulfilled, their power is no longer needed. However, the twins manage to weakly call upon the Fourth of the Seven Powers one last time to attempt telekinesis, and are able to block the entrance to the temple with a large statue. After this last effort, their power completely dissipates. With their intelligence and a carefully planned strategy however, the twins, Martin and the society of Freedom manage to defeat Po Dung and the other eunuchs. The Empress then loses her mandate to rule.

Giovanne makes a final appearance, congratulating the Twins on their success. He also reveals that he has appeared throughout their journey, in various forms, including as the famous "Great Sebatier". The rebels, now in charge of the Forbidden City, announce that China is free. Julie is set to return to her home in England, with her father. However, terrified at the prospect of being separated from again, presumably forever, Jules and Julie run away together to the desert.

== Characters ==
Jules Tournier
A Chinese boy and one of the prophesied twins of destiny. Jules is seemingly young, but intelligent, and always on the lookout for his twin sister Julie. He is quite resourceful and quick thinking, coming up with plans to thwart adversaries.

Julie Tournier
An English girl and the other twin of destiny. She is kind, caring and considerate. Julie's faith in the power is not as strong as Jules, but she will always support her brother no matter what.

The Moon Goddess
She is never spoken to directly, but mentioned in passing. The Moon Goddess supplies Jules and Julie with the seven divine abilities, and will try and twist the outcome of events slightly to favor the twins. A number of other characters often refer to the twins power as divine, a blessing from God, the gods, or Allah, implying that the Moon goddess may just be another name for god.

Captain Paul Henri Tournier
A retired sea-captain and adoptive father of Jules and Julie. He loves his children, but is getting on in years and feels that he needs to tell the two children the truth about their past.

Martin Garcon
A first mate from Captain Tournier's ship. He is now an independent sailor in his own right, but is on friendly terms with Captain Tournier. Upon Captain Tournier's death, he is made legal guardian of the twins.

Professor Leopold Ledeaux
An academic who befriends the twins and Martin Garcon in their initial travels through France. He becomes a close confidant of Martin.

Shou Ko
A respected member of the Society of Freedom. He tells the twins of their true past, and their goal to return the tablets of Laozi to the Temple of Heavenly Harmony.

Paulette
A waitress in a French Bar who is involved in money-swindling activities, she forgoes her bad ways and becomes Martin's romantic interest.

Giovanne
A benevolent spirit with many powers. Giovanne is a servant of the Goddess Moon and is tasked with keeping an eye on the twins (in various disguises, including the travelling magician Pretty Good Sabatier). Giovanne also teaches the twins the use of the seven powers of the Goddess Moon, and appears several times when Jules and Julie face moral dilemmas.

Po Dung
Leader of eunuchs tasked with killing the twins of destiny before they can reach China and overthrow the Empress. His obsession for finding the twins leads him to follow them across the entire continent of Eurasia.

Ho Cheng
The court magician of the Empress. He is accompanied by several servants, and has great magical powers, rivaling those of the twins. He can use his crystal ball to predict the future and determine the location of Jules and Julie at any point in time. Ho Cheng is revealed to have his own political aspirations, hoping to overthrow the Empress and install himself as ruler of China. He is eventually revealed to be a demon in the form of a giant brain, and is destroyed with the combined efforts of Jules, Julie, and Kung Lee the pirate.

The Empress Dowager
The Empress is the tyrannical ruler of China, and is fearful for her safety upon learning of the survival of the twins of destiny. She sends her eunuchs to find and kill the twins before they can reach China.

== Voice cast ==
Character	English Dub Actor	Original Actors
Jules Tournier	Susan Sheridan	Hervé Rey
Julie Tournier	Joanna Ruiz	Barbara Tissier
Martin Garçon	Jeff Harding	Edgar Givry
Captain Paul Henri Tournier	William Roberts	Marc Cassot
Professor Leopold Ledoux	Peter Marinker	Michel Clinch
Paulette	Stacey Gregg	Evelyne Grandjean
Sabatier	Jeff Harding	1. Philippe Ariotti; 2. Gérard Surugue
Giovanne		Gérard Dessalles
Shao Ko	Peter Whitman	Michel Clinch
Kung Li	Garrick Hagon	Jacques Feel
Ho Huan	Peter Marinker	Gérard Dessalles
Empress Dowager	Liza Ross	Evelyne Grandjean
Po Dung	Peter Marinker	Michel Vigny
Ho Chang	1. Peter Whitman (episodes 2–3); 2. William Roberts (episodes 36–48)	Serge Bourrier
Narrator	Peter Marinker	Gérard Dessalles

== Episodes ==
1. "The Birth"
2. "Death at Sea"
3. "A New Life"
4. "Journey to Paris"
5. "The Discovery"
6. "The Enemy Arrives"
7. "The Attack"
8. "A Terrible New Home"
9. "The Trap"
10. "No Escape"
11. "Friend or Foe?"
12. "Danger in the Night"
13. "A Fiery Friend"
14. "The Road to Danger"
15. "To Trap a Hero"
16. "The Twins Are Sold"
17. "The Heart of the Shadows"
18. "The Rabbits of Destiny"
19. "The Journey Continues"
20. "Crossed Paths"
21. "Children of the Moon Goddess"
22. "Goodbye to a Friend"
23. "A Beautiful and Dangerous River"
24. "Faith"
25. "Adventure in Avignon"
26. "Marseilles, at Last!"
27. "The House of Despair"
28. "The Light in the Night"
29. "A Time to Leave"
30. "Voyage into Danger"
31. "In the Eye of the Storm"
32. "Safe and Sound"
33. "The Return of the Mafiosi"
34. "Cruel Sea, Kind Sea"
35. "A Change of Plans"
36. "Battle at Sea"
37. "Heroes and Villains"
38. "Woman of Greece"
39. "The Terrible Lie"
40. "Greece by Night"
41. "Athens by Night"
42. "A Land of Danger"
43. "Danger in the Desert"
44. "Desert Adventure"
45. "The Net Tightens"
46. "Into the Mountains"
47. "Shifting Tides"
48. "Battle for the Tablets"
49. "Reunion"
50. "Attack on the Forbidden City"
51. "The Temple of Heavenly Harmony"
52. "The Final Battle"

== The Seven Divine Powers ==
As a gift from the Moon Goddess, Jules and Julie both have the ability to summon a magic power that can do their bidding. In order to summon this power, the twins must hold hands and concentrate. Furthermore, the twins must both have in their possession the tablets of Lao Tze (Jules carries them wrapped up in his front pocket). In one incident, the tablets were stolen, and the twins had to battle without their magic powers.

The power comes in a blue light that emits from the twins' hands which, at first, is stationary. When a certain level of concentration is reached by the twins, the power will manifest into different superhuman abilities (see below) as it becomes brighter and bursts into rays. Also, in later episodes, the power manifests only when the twins say the words "We call upon the Xth of the seven powers to" and its intended purpose (ex. "We call upon the second of the seven powers to create a shield").

The twins' magical abilities are initially very primal and poorly controlled. It is not until they meet Giovanne (approximately halfway through the series) that they learn that their magic manifests itself in "seven powers", which can be summoned at any time, so long as the twins can physically touch hands.

Below are a list of the Seven Powers as stated by Giovanne in the episode "In the Eye of the Storm".

The First Power
The Power of Illusion: The Twins can temporarily create realistic illusions to confuse others. They often conjure the image of dragons, but have also been known to create images of a large dog, and even multiple copies of themselves, to escape the Acropolis in Greece. Although able to scare and confuse laymen, Po Dung and Ho Cheng eventually learn that these illusions are not real creations, failing to scare them away.
The Second Power
The Power of the Wall: When holding hands, the Twins can protect themselves from attack with a wall of light. This is used frequently throughout the series, especially to defend against attacks from the eunuchs. Ho Cheng has demonstrated the ability to nullify its effect.
The Third Power
The Power to Shatter: Jules and Julie are also informed that they can cause objects to shatter and break apart. This power is often used as an offensive technique, and to disarm opponents. In their travels under the sewers of Peking, the twins used it to create a space for much needed air, as the water levels in the tunnels began to rose.
The Fourth Power
The Power to Lift and Move Objects: This allowed the Twins to move and manipulate large objects akin to telekinesis. A notable use of it was when it was used in an attempt to block the entrance to the Temple of Heavenly Harmony with a large statue to defend against the eunuchs. This was the last time Jules and Julie were able to summon the power, as it completely faded after this final manifestation.
The Fifth Power
The Power to Operate Machines: Allowing the Twins to manipulate and operate complex machinery. Using this power, they were able to fix a broken-down train in Greece without any knowledge of engineering, and were thus able to evade capture by the eunuchs.
The Sixth Power
The Power to Control the Elements: This allowed the Twins to control natural forces (e.g. the winds, the tides). In one instance, the twins and Martin were forced to flee their sinking boat into a life-raft off the coast of Italy. With no wind available, and Martin too weak and injured to row to shore, Julie and Jules call upon the Sixth Power to generate a current that would carry them to shore. As the magic is cast, Jules falls asleep from exhaustion. Despite this, the power continues to work, as Julie continues to hold his hand.
The Seventh Power
The Power to Control Minds: This allowed the Twins to influence and even control the thoughts of others. Giovanne explains, however, that this power should be used as a last resort, as it causes extreme fatigue on the mind and body. The first major use was when Jules and Julie convinced the captain of a ship to change course and travel directly to China (they subsequently used the power again to change his mind back to his original plan, having felt guilty about abusing the power). Only used rarely, this technique was also used to defeat the demon brain form of the great magician, Ho Cheng.

In the English dub of the series, the order of the powers is occasionally mixed up (e.g. The Fourth Power becomes "the Power to Control All Elements", instead of "the Power to Lift and Move Objects").
