= Pamela Martin (television reporter) =

Canadian television presenter

Pamela Martin (born 1953) is an American-born television reporter and news anchor on Canadian television who now works as a director of engagement for the British Columbia Liberal political party.

== Biography ==
Born in Detroit, Michigan, she immigrated to British Columbia, and joined Victoria's CHEK-TV as a co-host and producer in 1975. She moved to Vancouver's CKNW AM 980 the next year and became that station's first female reporter. She accepted an offer from BCTV (then Vancouver's CTV affiliate) in 1977, and anchored at that station until 2001, when she joined CTV British Columbia (CIVT). She formerly co-anchored the weekday 6:00 pm newscasts on CTV British Columbia alongside Bill Good.

On December 7, 2010, Martin announced her resignation from her position as Anchor on CTV News Vancouver along with her co-host Bill Good. Their last broadcast aired on December 29, 2010.

On January 5, 2011, Martin announced that she had joined politician Christy Clark's campaign team for the British Columbia Liberal Party Leadership race after another television reporter, Chris Olsen (from CTV's Olsen on Your Side) resigned as Clark's media aide. He received $67,000 in severance. Clark was named party leader March 14, 2011. Martin defended the shift from journalism to politics.

In September 2013, Martin left her $130,000 government position in the premier's office to be the director of engagement for the British Columbia Liberal party, in order to campaign for Clark in the May 2014 election.

In 1968, Martin won the Miss Teen USA title (not to be confused with the Miss Teen USA pageant established in 1983).

== Filmography ==
Year	Title	Role	Notes
1980	Touch and Go	Bank Manager	
1986	The Christmas Star	Newscaster	
1987	Sworn to Silence	TV Reporter	TV Movie
1988	The Accused	TV Commentator	
1988	MacGyver	Reporter / Nancy Bartlett	TV Series, 2 Episodes
1989-1991	Neon Rider	Reporter	TV Series, 2 Episodes
1991	Run	News Anchor	
1991	He Said, She Said	A.M. Baltimore Host	
1992	Diagnosis Murder: Diagnosis of Murder	Newscaster	TV Movie
1992	Dead Ahead: The Exxon Valdez Disaster	TV Reporter – Media	TV Movie
1993	The Bots Master	Additional Voices	TV Series
1994	Timecop	TV Commentator	
1996	The Limbic Region	News Anchor	TV Movie
1997	Masterminds	Reporter	
1998	The Net	Anchor Reporter	TV Series
1998	Night Man	Newscaster	TV Series
1998	First Wave	Newscaster	TV Series
2000	Runaway Virus	TV Newscaster	TV Movie
2000	Seven Days	CZN Anchorwoman	TV Series
2002	Life or Something Like It	KQMO Anchorwoman	
2003	The Core	News Anchor	
