= Littlest Pet Shop (1995 TV series) =

1995 animated comedy television series

- Based on: Littlest Pet Shop franchise by Kenner Products
- Directed by: Xavier Picard
- Creative director: Jay Bacal
- Voices of: Lynda Boyd; Garry Chalk; Babs Chula; Ted Cole; Ian James Corlett; Michael Donovan; Shirley Millner; Sarah Strange; Lee Tockar
- Theme music composer: Giacomo Cosenza
- Composer: Giacomo Cosenza
- Countries of origin: United States; France
- Original language: English
- No. of seasons: 1
- No. of episodes: 40 (80 segments)

Production
- Executive producers: Joe Bacal; Jean Chalopin; Tom Griffin; C.J. Kettler
- Producer: Roy Wilson
- Editor: Thierry Leray
- Production companies: Sunbow Entertainment; Créativité & Développement; AB Productions

Original release
- Network: M6 Kid (France); Broadcast syndication (U.S.)
- Release: September 11 – November 3, 1995

Related
- Littlest Pet Shop (2012 TV series); Littlest Pet Shop: A World of Our Own

Littlest Pet Shop is an animated children's television series and comedy based on the toy franchise Littlest Pet Shop released by Kenner Products. The series debuted on September 11, 1995, in the United States and syndicated to local stations by distributor Claster Television. It was produced by Sunbow Entertainment in the United States, and Créativité & Développement and AB Productions in France.

For a brief time in America, the show was a bit of a hit. The humor and style of the show was mostly inspired by cartoons such as Looney Tunes, Tiny Toon Adventures and Animaniacs. While not violent, the show was filled with lots of slapstick humor, as well as pop cultural references, puns, parodies and zany adventures.

== Plot ==
Littlest Pet Shop follows the lives of five miniature animals who live in a pet shop on Littlest Lane and have their own treehouse inside of the store. Sometimes the main pets do end up in the homes of eager owners, mostly children, but it never works out for them. Unlike regular pets, the gang aren't overly cutesy, but zany, anthropomorphic characters. Usually their adventures at their new homes never work out and they end up returning to the store to rejoin their friends.

== Characters ==
=== Main ===
- Stu (voiced by Michael Donovan) is a blue dog with a bumbling personality who happens to be a big eater. He claimed in one episode that his name is short for "stupendous" but it could just be bragging rights. He's been called by Viv as the most loyal and most lovable of the pets. He wears a green cap backwards and has cream coloured muzzle, also short hair in a darker blue.
- Chloe (voiced by Babs Chula) is a snarky purple cat who has been reincarnated many times. Her first life dates to Ancient Egypt. She has dark short tufts of hair on her head, wears a pink collar and blue belly fur. Stu is the butt of Chloe's jokes, but above all, the two are great friends. Chloe also lost her sixth life during her time in the pocket of a daredevil trying to do a stunt on a motorbike. Despite her sass, she does care about and greatly respect the others. Chloe also has a twin sister named Sabrina who looks exactly like her, but with a mole on her armpit.
- Viv (voiced by Lynda Boyd) is a music-loving pink rabbit who sings and dances. She has a backing band that lives in her top hat. She speaks with a British accent similar to that of famous rock stars and acts such as Spinal Tap. Viv has short blonde hair, her fur is pink and white and she wears blue eyeshadow, she also loves wrestling, like her friends and dreams of being famous. She wears a purple top hat, sometimes keeps things in there for safe keeping, but mostly, her trusty guitar that she loves to play. She also writes her own songs.
- Chet (voiced by Lee Tockar) is a macho yellow horse who acts like a cowboy. He is proud of his strength and is not a fan of "cute". He speaks with a Southern accent. Chet is closest friends with Stu.
- Squeaks (vocal effects provided by Ted Cole) is a red monkey who loves bananas and speaks in monkey language that the other characters understand. Squeaks also has a yellow muzzle, paws and tail. His tail can act as certain objects, such as rakes, shovels and even scissors. He's fairly childish but does try to warn the others of danger. Because he doesn't talk, he has to try and use pantomime to tell the others what is happening.

=== Recurring ===
- Elwood P. Harvey (voiced by Ian James Corlett) is a man who runs the pet shop. His name and appearance are a reference to the movie Harvey.
- Delilah (voiced by Shirley Millner) is a normal-sized monitor lizard who plots to eat the pets and is owned by Elwood. She has a Hungarian accent and wears a pink ribbon with a bell round her neck.
- Harriet is a parrot who often joins the main pets.
- Rookie (voiced by Sarah Strange) is a brown puppy who lives in the pet shop.
- Sergeant Butch Kowalski (voiced by Garry Chalk) is a green militaristic hamster. Has a yellow mohawk.
- Bernice (voiced by Kathleen Barr) is a hamster and Butch's love interest. She has a sister named Juliet and is a little bigger than Sarge. She's tan colour with a pink belly and short hair.
- Mumsy (voiced by Kathleen Barr) is an archaeologist and explorer who is Elwood's mother.
- Rat - a scheming, villainous rat.
- Cheesehead - the other rat, who's not as bright.
- Larry J. Weasel - a celebrity weasel who appeared occasionally, has an assistant named Sue, a sheep.
- Two Stink Bug characters, can't remember the names, two other villainous characters

== Episodes ==
No.	Title	Original release date
1	"What Do You Mean Little?"	September 11, 1995
1	"No Starch Please"	September 11, 1995
2	"Frogs!"	September 12, 1995
2	"The Closet Eater"	September 12, 1995
"Frogs!": Three frogs -- Slimy, Warts and Fat -- come to the pet shop, but are pretty gross to the animals. "The Closet Eater": Stu spoils his diet and almost becomes a meal for the lizard Delilah.
3	"Chet, the Dream Horse"	September 13, 1995
3	"Going Bananas"	September 13, 1995
4	"Squeaks in Space"	September 14, 1995
4	"Are You My Mumsy?"	September 14, 1995
"Squeaks in Space": Squeaks is held prisoner on a banana planet, the other animals coming to his rescue. "Are You My Mumsy?": Elwood receives an egg in a package from Mumsy. After it is saved from Deliliah, the egg hatches into a baby dragon who befriends Viv and works to save her from Delilah in a rock opera musical number.
5	"Scaredy Dog"	September 15, 1995
5	"Littlest Pit Stop"	September 15, 1995
6	"Treasure of Sierra Pet Shop / Really Big"	September 18, 1995
7	"The Bully Bugs / The Littlest Whodunit"	September 19, 1995
8	"The Itch to Be Rich / Mechanical Madness"	September 20, 1995
"The Itch To Be Rich": Margabelle Crumbhorn, the world's richest girl, and her nanny brings Viv to their mansion when she tries to stop Shelby the Armadillo from causing trouble.
9	"Inmate Rookie / A Game of Cat and Mouse and Dog"	September 21, 1995
10	"Baby! / Littlest Pet Detective"	September 22, 1995
11	"Belly of the Beast / Cops and Robbers and Pets, Oh My!"	September 25, 1995
12	"The Deadly Derby / Return to Sender"	September 26, 1995
13	"Attack of the Manwolf / My Fair Hamster"	September 27, 1995
14	"Black-Out / Don't Rain on My Banana"	September 28, 1995
15	"Do Not Solve Until Christmas / A Gift of Gab"	September 29, 1995
16	"For the Love of Lovas / Obedience School"	October 2, 1995
17	"Hamster-Lympics / King Squeaks"	October 3, 1995
18	"Frankenstu / Wanted: Squeaks"	October 4, 1995
19	"The Black Cat / Bunny Beat"	October 5, 1995
20	"Travels With My Mumsy / The Best Things in Life Are Flea"	October 6, 1995
21	"Littlest Pet Shop of Biggest Horrors / The Jungle Novella"	October 9, 1995
22	"The Rotten Apple / Nothing Up My Sleeve"	October 10, 1995
23	"Curse of the Mumsy / Whenever Lola Laughs"	October 11, 1995
24	"Squeaks' Sibling Rivalry / Slinging Fur"	October 12, 1995
25	"Kowalski and Juliet / Mind Over Monkey"	October 13, 1995
26	"They Came from Beyond the Dumpster / Lonesome Chet"	October 16, 1995
27	"Squeaks on a Stick / The Bug House"	October 17, 1995
28	"My Fair Rookie / Farewell, Delilah"	October 18, 1995
29	"Stu Man and Super Squeaks / The Bugs in the Wall Gang"	October 19, 1995
30	"Night of the Elwood / Drained"	October 20, 1995
31	"It's a Wonderful Hat / This Old Treehouse"	October 23, 1995
32	"Informercial Superflyway / Dream Vacation"	October 24, 1995
33	"The Mighty Clucks / Little Junior"	October 25, 1995
34	"Wrecking Havoc / Chet Goes Hollywood"	October 26, 1995
35	"The Young and the Vetless / Chloe Tells All"	October 27, 1995
36	"Encino Mammoth / When in ROM"	October 30, 1995
"Encino Mammoth": The pets defrost a tiny woolly mammoth that is frozen in the ice rink. With Butch's help, they work to get the woolly mammoth good looking so that it can be sold by Elwood.; "When in ROM":
37	"Chloe's Evil Twin / The Magnificent Pets"	October 31, 1995
38	"The Perils of Bernice / Delilah's Bell"	November 1, 1995
39	"Who Scrooged McRude? / Too Many Birds"	November 2, 1995
40	"Witness Protection Pup / Eleven Minutes of Fame"	November 3, 1995

== Production ==
Littlest Pet Shop was animated by AKOM in South Korea, K.K. C&D Asia in Japan, and Wang Film Productions in Taiwan.

== Broadcast ==
Littlest Pet Shop was syndicated to local stations in the United States. The series was also broadcast on Tiny Pop and CBBC in the United Kingdom.

== Home media releases ==
In 1996, Family Home Entertainment released the show on four VHS cassettes each containing 2 to 4 episodes. The Christmas video entitled Do Not Solve Until Christmas (which contains "Do Not Solve Until Christmas" and "Who Scrooged McRude?") was released as part of the Family Home Entertainment Christmas Classics series.
