= Xavier Picard =

French animation director (born 1962)

Xavier Picard (born 1962, Reims) is a French animation director. His most notable animation credits include the feature film Moomins on the Riviera (2014), and the TV-series Odd Family (2005), Marcelino Pan y Vino (2001), Littlest Pet Shop (1995) and the animation series King Arthur and the Knights of Justice (1992) and The Bots Master (1993). In 2019, he worked on Jean-François Laguionie's Le Voyage du Prince.
