= King Arthur and the Knights of Justice =

1992–1993 American-Canadian-French animated TV series

- Complete series DVD cover
- Genre: Action; Adventure; Fantasy
- Created by: Diane Eskenazi; Avi Arad
- Written by: Diane Eskenazi
- Directed by: Stephan Martinière; Charlie Sansonetti; Xavier Picard
- Creative directors: Stephan Martinière; Charlie Sansonetti
- Voices of: Kathleen Barr; Michael Beattie; Jim Byrnes; Garry Chalk; Michael Donovan; Mark Hildreth; Lee Jeffrey; Willow Johnson; Andrew Kavadas; Scott McNeil; Teryl Rothery; Venus Terzo
- Composers: Haim Saban; Shuki Levy
- Countries of origin: United States; Canada; France
- Original language: English
- No. of seasons: 2
- No. of episodes: 26

Production
- Executive producers: Allen Bohbot; Jean Chalopin; Diane Eskenazi (season 1); Avi Arad (season 1)
- Producers: Mark Taylor; Xavier Picard; Allen Bohbot (season 1); Diane Eskenazi (season 1)
- Running time: 22 minutes
- Production companies: C&D (Créativité et Développement); Golden Films; Bohbot Entertainment

Original release
- Network: Syndication (Amazin' Adventures)
- Release: September 13, 1992 – December 12, 1993

King Arthur and the Knights of Justice is an animated series produced by Golden Films, C&D (Créativité et Développement), and Bohbot Entertainment and created by Diane Eskenazi and Avi Arad, who also served as executive producers. The series aired from September 13, 1992, to December 12, 1993, with two seasons and twenty-six episodes. It aired as part of Bohbot's Amazin' Adventures programming block.

== Plot ==
After King Arthur's sister, the evil sorceress Queen Morgana, traps him and the Knights of the Round Table in the Cave of Glass, the wizard Merlin is unable to free them himself. He searches the timeline for replacement Knights. In modern times, he finds Arthur King, the quarterback of the New England football team The Knights, and transports him and his teammates to Camelot after one of their football games. He appoints Arthur as their leader and his teammates as the new Knights of the Round Table and tasks them with freeing King Arthur and the Knights. To do so, they must find the Twelve Keys of Truth, one for each knight that only the knight can initially touch and one for King Arthur. Once all the keys are found, the knights will be free and the team can return home. In the meantime, they pledge "fairness to all, to protect the weak and vanquish the evil".

== Characters ==
=== The Knights of the Round Table ===
Members of the football team The Knights, whom Merlin transports to Camelot to serve as replacements for King Arthur and the Knights until they can be freed. The Knights are armed with special armor and can summon their respective creatures when in battle armor. These animals, such as King Arthur's wyvern, are emblazoned on their shields.

- King Arthur (Arthur King) (voiced by Andrew Kavadas) is the quarterback of his football team, The Knights, in modern times. While he sometimes seeks Merlin's advice, he usually comes up with strategies and battle plans on his own and his leadership helps to bring the team together. He wields Excalibur as well as a shield that houses the Dragon of Justice, also known as the Dragon of the Shield, a wyvern that was the family crest of the original Arthur. He also has a horse named Valor.
- Sir Lancelot (Lance) (voiced by Scott McNeil) is the second-in-command of the knights and Arthur's best friend. He is fearless and brave and usually the most serious of the knights. His primary weapon is a lance and his shield emblem is a lion.
- Sir Tone (Anthony) (voiced by Scott McNeil) is the team's inventor and blacksmith due to his experience in his school's metal shop, inventing machines based on those he has seen in his own time. His primary weapons are a hammer and chisel, which he uses to build.
- Sir Trunk (voiced by Scott McNeil) is the knights' strongman. His primary weapon is a double-headed battle axe and his shield emblem is a ram, whose strength allows it to break through walls and carry several people on its back.
- Sir Wally (voiced by Lee Jeffrey) is a guard for The Knights and Arthur's bodyguard, as well as Sir Brick's best friend. He is good-natured, but harsh on himself when he makes mistakes. His shield emblem is a falcon.
- Sir Brick (voiced by Garry Chalk) is Arthur's bodyguard and Sir Wally's best friend, whose loyalty to his friends is unwavering. He can call forth a supply of bricks from his chest plate, which can be used to create walls.
- Sir Phil (voiced by Garry Chalk) is one of the stronger knights of the twelve. His primary weapon is a club and his shield emblem is a black panther.
- Sir Darren (voiced by Michael Donovan) is Lady Elaine's love interest, who is cool and confident both on and off the battlefield. His shield emblem is an eagle that can carry several people in its talons.
- Sir Gallop (voiced by Mark Hildreth) is one of the knights. While he often flirts with women, he is respectful towards them, and later begins dating the peasant girl Katherine. His primary weapon is a pike with a spiked ball on the end and his shield emblem is a two-headed hound.
- Sir Breeze (voiced by Lee Jeffrey) is The Knights' wide receiver, who is afraid of heights and small spaces. While he can be egotistical, he knows where his priorities lie. His primary weapon is a pike which can shoot bolts from the tip and his shield emblem is the sphinx.
- Sir Lug (voiced by Michael Donovan) is The Knights' equipment manager, who in medieval times is in charge of Camelot's squires. He has low self-esteem and is often picked on by the other knights, but has great courage and can hold his own in a fight. His chest armor launches a football projectile at enemies and his shield emblem resembles the kraken.
- Sir Zeke (voiced by Mark Hildreth) is the sole Asian player of The Knights, who is also the genius of the group.

=== Camelot characters ===
- Merlin (voiced by Jim Byrnes) is a wizard who served King Arthur. He was responsible for bringing Arthur King and his teammates into the past to fight Morgana after King Arthur and his knights were imprisoned since his magic can't free King Arthur and his knights from the Cave of Glass. Merlin is a great asset to the knights and uses his spells, potions, and advice to assist them. He is also the only person from his time period to know their true identities.
- Queen Guinevere (voiced by Kathleen Barr) is Camelot's queen and King Arthur's wife. She was captured by Morgana, but is later rescued by Arthur King, Lance, and Trunk. As she is unaware that Arthur King is not King Arthur, she often worries about the change in his demeanor.
- Lady Elaine (voiced by Venus Terzo) is Guinevere's attendant and Darren's girlfriend.
- Lady Mary is Guinevere's second attendant and Squire Everett's aunt.
- Cryslin (Voiced by Willow Johnson) is a magician and daughter of Rigis, a friend of Merlin's. Though she appears in just one episode, there is heavy implications that she and Arthur King have feelings for each other.
- Katherine is a peasant girl who becomes Sir Gallop's girlfriend in season two.
- Squire Tyronne (voiced by Michael Donovan) is a squire who looks up to Sir Lug and dreams of becoming a knight.
- Squire Everett (voiced by Mark Hildreth) is Lady Mary's nephew who is passionate about being a knight.
- Lady of the Table (voiced by Kathleen Barr) is the protector of the knights, whose spirit is seen as the knights are equipped with their armor and weapons. They cannot see her until the episode "What the Key Unlocked" where she reveals herself to Lance. She usually tells them to "speak the oath" before activating their transformation.

=== Villains ===
- Queen Morgana / Lady Morgana (voiced by Kathleen Barr) is an evil sorceress and the main antagonist of the series who possesses great magical powers. She was responsible for sealing Arthur and his knights in the Cave of Glass. While she does not know where they came from, Morgana knows that the new knights are not the real ones.
  - Lord Viper (voiced by Garry Chalk) is Morgana's second-in-command and overall field commander of the Warlords who harbors hatred towards Arthur King and sports a viper-themed helmet. While he primarily wields a sword, he also has a snake emblem on his armor that can attack others. Lord Viper rides in a cart that also functions as a catapult. While Lord Viper's action figure bio lists him as a high-ranking warlord, the comic book adaption lists him as a human.
  - The Warlords are Morgana's minions who were constructed from stone. If they are broken or destroyed in battle, Morgana can reassemble them using magic.
    - Warlord Axe (voiced by Scott McNeil) is a warlord with axe blades on his helmet who is not too bright. Axe has a plethora of ax weapons and an ax cart. He has appeared in almost every episode and has defeated King Arthur on two separate occasions.
    - Warlord Bash (voiced by Garry Chalk) is a primitive warlord in a skull-shaped helmet who wields a bone club and skull-shaped shield. He likely represents the Saxon barbarians that raid most of Europe in legend.
    - Warlord Blackwing (voiced by Scott McNeil) is the third-in-command and Viper's right-hand man in a pointy helmet. Blackwing possesses Pteranodon-like wings and can fly, allowing him to attack his enemies with the mid-air dart attacks from his talons. He is also equipped with a pike. Warlord Blackwing is responsible for capturing Guinevere early in the series.
    - Warlord Blinder is a warlord who is able to blind his opponents by striking together his two daggers. He can also throw them with perfect aim.
    - Warlord Hammer (voiced by Michael Donovan) is a super-strong warlord with two hammers as weapons considered to be one of the strongest and largest of the Warlords.
    - Warlord Lucan is a savage wolf-themed warlord with sharp claws on his gloves, missile attacks, and a wolf-head cart that breathes fire.
    - Warlord Slasher is a warlord with many sharp weapons including spears, a serrated–spiked cape that is almost bat-shaped, and a spear cart. Also, his armor could be configured into a pair of deadly gauntlets. Like Blackwing, he can fly, but does so rarely.
    - Warlord Spike is a warlord with a voulge style weapon, two long spikes on his helmet, and a spear cart that can shoot projectiles. He also seems to be one of the smartest as he leads many missions and applies battle strategies.
    - The Warlord Foot Soldiers are the generic foot soldiers
- The Purple Horde is an army of Asian warriors who oppose the Knights in the second season. Led by Master Chang, they aim for conquest and are in an alliance with the Warlords.
  - Master Chang (voiced by Michael Donovan) is the leader of the Purple Horde who upholds a strict code of honor for them to abide by, allowing for a level of understanding between them and the Knights.
  - Awan is a warrior who uses a nunchaku and carries a war horn.
  - Hung is a warrior who wields bow and arrows.
  - Ti Ben is a warrior who uses portable gunpowder-based artillery.
  - Rim is a warrior who uses a sword-dagger combo and bombs.
  - Po is a ninja who uses a kusarigama and shuriken.

== Episodes ==
=== Season 1 (1992) ===
No. overall	No. in season	Title	Original release date
1	1	"Opening Kick-off"	September 13, 1992
When King Arthur and the Knights of the Round Table are defeated by the Warlords and then Queen Guinevere is later captured by the foes, the wizard Merlin recruits a group of football players from the present day to protect Camelot and save the queen.
2	2	"A Knight's Quest"	September 20, 1992
Having repelled the Warlords once, the Knights of Justice continue to make their way with Merlin's help toward where Morgana holds Guinevere. Morgana is aware that King Arthur and his knights are still imprisoned so those approaching are strangers. She succeeds in capturing Lance and Trunk, causing Arthur to travel to her castle to rescue them as well.
3	3	"The Unbeliever"	September 27, 1992
Lady Elaine warns Arthur and his Knights of a premonition she recently has dreamed, foretelling the quest to gain the Key of Truth to be a trap.
4	4	"Even Knights... Have to Eat"	October 4, 1992
Merlin's falcon reveals to him that the key Arthur alone can use to free King Arthur from the Cave of Glass has been found. Merlin creates an impenetrable tunnel to send Arthur, Gallup, and Phil most of the way to retrieve it, but Morgana is aware of the extreme use of magic so reasons whom has used it and why. She sends Lord Viper and the Warlords to Crownhorn, the village it's ended up near, just after the knights stand up for Orin, a villager in a misunderstanding with an army of gnomes then are offered hospitality by him and his wife Kate. Suspecting the knights are in the home of Orin or a neighbor, they kidnap Kate with orders for Orin to bring a knight to him to ransom her.
5	5	"Assault On Castle Morgana"	October 11, 1992
The Warlords make a failed attempt on Camelot, though do cause a fire. Lug is having self-esteem issues since he fears the dangers faced in battle and is still equipment manager, just in a different time and leading squires as well. Lord Viper and Blackwing succeed in capturing a unicorn for Morgana that she may use its power over all animals to beat the knights to finding the Keys of Truth. Merlin learns of this when the balance of magic is out of order as a result, and sees it as a cure for the restlessness of most of the knights. He sends Arthur, Breeze, Wally, Trunk, and Lug to free it, but they accidentally end up taking along Tyronne, who fell asleep in Arthur's wagon.
6	6	"Quest for Courage"	October 18, 1992
The magician Cryslin requests Arthur's help in freeing her father, Merlin's sorcerer friend Rigis, from a sea serpent. He accepts and goes with Lance, Tone, Breeze, Trunk, Gallup, and Everett, but Everett's falling off the wagon she turned invisible reveals them soon after. The Warlords attack the knights near a village where a group of boys assist them in the victory. But the men in the village fear the Warlords, who vow vengeance on them. The knights stay behind to defend it against their promised attack while Arthur, despite learning from Crislin that she was leading him into a trap in exchange for her father's life, goes with her anyway to defeat the serpent and rescue Rigis.
7	7	"The Warlord Knight"	October 25, 1992
Lance and Breeze are attacked by Warlords on their way back to Camelot from a mission, and Lucan succeeds in forcing Lance off a high cliff. While the Knights of Justice try to get over the shock of his loss, the Warlords learn he is actually alive but with amnesia when he approaches them. They take him to Morgana, who realizes that his tumble into the River of Forgetfulness will let them trick him into thinking he is one of them. They claim he is the Warlord Sir William, twin to Lancelot who just defected from King Arthur, whom she convinces him is evil, Everyone is overjoyed when Lance returns to Camelot, but don't know that his surprisingly distant behavior masks that he intends to deliver them into Morgana's hands.
8	8	"The Challenge"	November 1, 1992
Breeze is wounded during a battle with the Warlords. Determined to let none of the other Knights of Justice come to harm at his side, Arthur challenges Viper to single combat, and has Zeke deliver it with other Warlords as witnesses so he'll have to keep his word. But everyone else's misgivings about Arthur's plan prove well-founded when Viper employs treachery in the duel.
9	9	"To Save A Squire"	November 8, 1992
Queen Morgana entrusts Warlord Blackwing with the Tears of Gortis, a potion she has created. Warlord Blackwing flies off with the potion on a special mission. Meanwhile, Lady Mary finds Squire Everett wearing the King's armor. She challenges him to some dueling practice. Warlord Blackwing arrives, and, thinking Squire Everett is King Arthur, throws the potion on him. The potion causes Squire Everett terrible pain, and Merlin knows there is only one cure; the Horn of Zug. The Horn of Zug is found near Morgana's castle in the Swamp of Zagar. Lady Mary reveals she was born and raised near the swamp so King Arthur, some of his Knights, and Lady Mary head off to obtain the horn. Along the way, they deal with Warlords, boobytraps, swamp creatures, and the Zug.
10	10	"The Surrender"	November 15, 1992
While on guard duty, some Knights see smoke in the forest and the group heads off to investigate the fire. The fire is merely a trap to lure the Knights away from Camelot. Meanwhile, Warlord Blackwing flies over Camelot and delivers a letter saying Lord Viper and Morgana wish to surrender. Arthur and Merlin fear a trap but agree they must take this chance at peace. The Knights leave Camelot to meet with Lord Viper and Morgana in the Valley of Roses; leaving only Squire Tyronne and Squire Everett to guard Camelot. While Camelot is unprotected, Warlord Blackwing flies in and lets the other Warlords in through the main gate. The ladies of Camelot and the squires must fend off the Warlords as best they can until Arthur and the Knights can return.
11	11	"Darren's Key"	November 22, 1992
Merlin wakes after having a nightmare where Sir Darren is battling Lord Viper and his goons. Lord Viper is spotted wearing Darren's Key of Truth; one of the 12 that must be found. Arthur and the Knights agree to go after Darren's key. They sneak attack the Warlords using their new hang glider but in doing so, Darren falls from the hang glider and is captured. Darren is then put on Morgana's newest torture device, the slime pit, which has the power to turn people into Warlords. Arthur and his Knights must fight their way through Morgana's castle to free Darren and get back his key.
12	12	"Viper's Phantom"	November 29, 1992
Queen Morgana has found Merlin's magic book. She uses the Spell of Invisibility and a magical Snake Bracelet to project Lord Viper's "phantom" within Camelot. Arthur and his Knights fight Lord Viper only to find out they are unable to hurt him. At a loss as to what they just witnessed, the Knights consult Merlin who determines intense light can be used to break through the bracelet's magic. Although Lord Viper avoids natural light by only attacking at night, King Arthur and his Knights must find a way to destroy the Snake Bracelet and stop Lord Viper.
13	13	"The Way Back"	December 6, 1992
Sir Tone is fighting the Warlords but ends up falling into a deep cavern in the ground. Within this cavern he comes upon what looks like a modern medical facility. Here he sees his mom's health failing and his dad being unable to find his son nor the whole football team. Merlin explains that Sir Tone might be able to visit his parents for 1 hour if they combine Sir Darren's key with King Arthur's key. Merlin determines Grimlap the Giant has King Arthur's key. Arthur and his Knights must find a way to get the key from Grimlap and allow Sir Tone the 1 hour with his parents.

=== Season 2 (1993) ===
No. overall	No. in season	Title	Original release date
14	1	"A Matter of Honor"	September 12, 1993
Master Chang comes upon a woman (Katherine) being hassled by some men. Chang scares the men off and claims the woman as his. He orders her to take him and his men (The Purple Horde) to her father. The Purple Horde arrive at the woman's village and forcibly conquer the village. The villagers send for Arthur's help. Meanwhile, Morgana and Lord Viper observe the Purple Horde and are interested in joining forces. Some Knights ride out to do battle with Master Chang, but they are quickly outnumbered and must retreat. The Warlords also retreat after fighting with the Purple Horde. It is here Queen Morgana orders Lord Viper to meet with Master Chang. The negotiations don't go well until Morgana projects herself and talks to Master Chang. Arthur must now battle Master Chang to free the village.
15	2	"What the Key Unlocked"	September 19, 1993
A village observes bubbling green water and rocks flying out of its local Bog Lake. Merlin knows this can only mean there is a Key of Truth in the lake. The Knights prepare, including the building of a new scuba diving platform, and set out for Bog Lake. Merlin uses his magic to help them arrive safely. It is at the lake that Sir Lance falls into a deep crevice on the lake floor and sees the Lady of the Table ("Speak the Oath" Lady) for the first time, but this all turns out to be a trick by Morgana. Sir Lance must now find his key and fight his way out of the lake.
16	3	"Tyronne and Everett Alone"	September 26, 1993
Arthur and several Knights are fighting to protect a local village, and after defeating all the Warlords of Stone, the mayor invites them to a feast. Believing they have destroyed all the Warlords (except Lord Viper and Morgana), they feel it safe to leave Camelot for the feast. This means Squires Tyronne and Everett are left in charge of Camelot. Merlin magically locks the Round Table room and gives the squires the only way to access the room; a magical orb. Morgana recreates Warlords Hammer and Blackwing and sends them to get the magical org and destroy the Round Table. With the help of the Lady of the Table, it is up to the squires to defend Camelot while the Knights are away.
17	4	"The Dark Side"	October 3, 1993
The Warlords are once again attacking Camelot from the main gate; distracting the Knights. Meanwhile, Morgana has Warlord Blackwing fly her into Camelot undetected. Within Camelot, she uses potions she has created to free Merlin's imprisoned evil side, Nilrem (Merlin spelled backwards). Merlin had previously separated and locked away this evil part of himself. Morgana is able to swap Nilrem in place of Merlin who goes about creating chaos within Camelot. Meanwhile, Merlin reaches out to Squire Tyronne to free him. Merlin and Nilrem battle each other while Morgana, realizing Merlin has escaped, launches an all out attack on Camelot.
18	5	"The Quitter"	October 10, 1993
After battling the Knights, the Warlords finally get the best of Arthur and steal Excalibur. Arthur is badly injured. Sir Wally feels everyone is blaming him for the group's failure and decides to leave the Knights and join the Warlords. The Warlords however are reluctant to let Sir Wally join them, but Sir Wally proves his sincerity by giving them Merlin's wand. After joined the Warlords, it is revealed this was a plan devised by Merlin and Sir Wally the whole time. Sir Wally must now fight his way through Castle Morgana to steal back Excalibur.
19	6	"Camelot Park"	October 17, 1993
While battling the Warlords, Lord Viper oddly orders a retreat. The Knights are confused why he retreated, but then they wonder if the ongoing eclipse has anything to do with it. Back in Camelot, Merlin reveals the Keys of Truth the Knights previously had are gone; taken into a time warp. Merlin says Morgana used her magic during the eclipse to send the Keys into the time warp. The time warp takes the Knights to the 1950s where an amusement park now sits where Camelot once stood. The Knights must fight through the Warlords to find the keys and hurry back to Camelot before the eclipse ends and the time warp closes.
20	7	"The High Ground"	October 24, 1993
The Knights successfully fend off an attack by Master Chang, but Arthur is frustrated by the Knights simply playing defense. Arthur wants the Knights to go on the offensive and this leads to Sir Breeze building gliders. The gliders allow the Knights to attack from the air and will help take the advantage away from Warlord Blackwing. The Knights take the gliders out for a spin but ultimately battle the Warlords and 2 of them must crash their damaged gliders in the woods. Sir Gallop and Sir Tone are now alone in the woods. Previously too scared to fly a glider, Sir Breeze must overcome his fears and take the last functional glider to save Sir Gallop and Sir Tone.
21	8	"The Island"	October 31, 1993
Merlin has a nightmare where he is off exploring Fear Island when he is caught off guard by a bright light. He believes of coming from the Sir Tone's Keys of Truth. Merlin sends the Knights to Fear Island to retrieve a Key of Truth, but he does warn them of a magical beast that inhabits the island. It turns out the nightmare was part of a trap set by Morgana. This means Arthur and the Knights must fight their way through Warlords, traps, and magical beasts to find the Key of Truth.
22	9	"Quest for the Book"	November 7, 1993
Merlin informs Arthur and his Knights that Morgana has stolen his Book of Magic. The plan is to trick the Purple Horde into fighting the Warlords leaving Castle Morgana unguarded. The Knights then sneak into the castle. They must battle magical beasts and traps within Castle Morgana to take back Merlin's Book of Magic and return it safely back to Camelot.
23	10	"Enter Morgana"	November 14, 1993
A man visits Camelot to tell Arthur how King Clovis needs the aid of the Knights. To prove he speaks the truth, he presents an old scroll that the true King Arthur wrote to King Clovis long ago. Arthur and the Knights set off to help King Clovis but eventually find themselves facing a trap set by Morgana. Afterwards, only Arthur returns to Camelot where he tells Guinevere he has surrendered to Morgana to spare everyone's lives. The Warlords are allowed into Camelot and Morgana reveals the injured Arthur that came to Camelot was just a magical trick. The Warlords take over Camelot and lock everyone in the dungeon. Morgana attempts to break through Merlin's magic and access the Round Table room before the Knights return.
24	11	"The Cure"	November 21, 1993
Some Knights are bringing supplies back to Camelot but they are cut off but the Warlords and the Purple Horde. Those still within Camelot's walls must create a diversion to allow the other Knights to get the supplies safely back to Camelot. Once the aid makes it back to Camelot, the Warlords blame Master Chang for the failure. Master Chang informs Morgana and Lord Viper the Purple Horde are dealing with a sickness called the Striking Typhus. Morgana secretly wants to use this sickness to eliminate the Purple Horde. The Knights, seeing the greater good, must find a way to cure the Purple Horde before the disease spreads.
25	12	"Winter Campaign"	November 28, 1993
The Warlords are attacking the neighboring castle of Count Edward Ainsworth. He ultimately is taken captive. His niece, Lady Elaine pleads with the Knights to free her uncle and tells them of a secret entrance to the castle that Merlin created long ago. Lady Elaine must be the one that opens this secret entrance so she is part of the team sneaking into Ainsworth's castle. Morgana conjures snow to slow down the attacking Knights so it is up to Sir Gallop and Lady Elaine to sneak into the castle to free the Count.
26	13	"Tone's Triumph"	December 12, 1993
Merlin tells the Knights he is giving them a magical shield that should protect them from Morgana's magic. Sir Breeze says he has doubts this shield will work. This shield is put to the test immediately as the Warlords start an attack. The Knights do battle with this new magical shield as well as Sir Tone's newest creation, gatling catapults. The victory is short-lived, however, as in the next battle, Sir Tone and Sir Wally are captured. Morgana puts a spell on Sir Tone to make him create a catapult for the Warlords. The Knights must now deal with Sir Tone's catapult attacking them... or do they?

== Video game ==
A video game based on the series was produced by Enix for the Super NES platform in 1995. The game features a final confrontation between King Arthur and Morgana, in the form of a giant dragon, providing a finale to the series where the Knights football team were able to return to their own time.

== Merchandise and comics ==
Mattel released a handful of 5 1/2" action figures and vehicles/accessories based on the show. Marvel Comics released a three-part comic book miniseries written by Mike Lackey in 1993.

The first issue of a soft reboot comic book series by Mad Cave Studios, written by Joe Corallo, was published in April 2024, to be continued in June 2025. "We find Arthur King and the Knights in school, having moved on from the drama of their recent kidnapping in Camelot. But when Gallop gets a new girlfriend and Morgana breaks free in Camelot, Arthur and his teammates find themselves having to become knights once more in order to defend their home world–and Camelot–from the threat of evil magic."

A crossover with Princess Gwenevere and the Jewel Riders, written by Jordie Bellaire and Joseph Corallo, was released in June 2026. "The newly combined teams must use their magical powers and knightly prowess and join forces for the first time and save their worlds, once and for all."

== Home releases ==
Maximum Entertainment released the complete series of King Arthur and the Knights of Justice on Region 2 DVD in the UK. In 2010, after several various partial VHS and DVD releases, Image Entertainment released the complete series as a boxed set in North America with all 26 episodes in a three-DVD set King Arthur and the Knights of Justice: The Complete Animated Series. Discotek Media released the series on Blu-ray in 2025.

For some time during late 2000s, the whole series had been made available for free watching through Internet streaming at the Lycos' SyncTV service and on Kidlet. Between 2012 and 2014, it was also available for instant streaming on Netflix. In 2016, Golden Films released it via Amazon.com. As of 2019, the series is available from the subscription service Watch It Kid!. The series is also available on tubi.

== Reception ==
The show has been ranked first on the lists of "The 10 Most Ridiculous Adaptations of Arthurian Legend" (2009) and the "8 Mostly Forgotten '90s Cartoons" (2011) by website Topless Robot, as well as "15 Most WTF Adaptations of King Arthur" by ScreenRant in 2017. Conversely, writer Mark McCray gave it a positive review "thanks to Chalopin's creative touches, which included a great premise, exceptional storytelling, and beautifully drawn animated characters."

== See also ==
- Princess Gwenevere and the Jewel Riders
