= The Bots Master =

1993 cartoon series

- Also known as: Le maître des bots
- Genre: Action; Science fiction
- Written by: Jean Chalopin; Jack Olesker
- Directed by: Shigeo Koshi; Xavier Picard
- Voices of: Mark Hildreth; Crystaleen O'Bray; Ian James Corlett; Richard Ian Cox; Michael Donovan; Stefano Giulianetti; Janyse Jaud; Sam Khouth; Rob Lehane; Cusse Mankume; Pamela Martin; Kim Restell; Chelan Simmons; Dale Wilson
- Music by: Alain Garcia
- Countries of origin: France; United States; Canada
- Original language: English
- No. of seasons: 1
- No. of episodes: 40

Production
- Executive producers: Avi Arad; Jean Chalopin
- Producers: Xavier Picard; Mark Taylor
- Running time: 23 minutes
- Production companies: AB Productions; Créativité et Développement; Avi Arad and Associates

Original release
- Network: YTV (Canada); Syndicated (US); TF1 and Mangas (France); TVP1 (Poland); Children's BBC and The Children's Channel (UK)
- Release: 27 September – 19 November 1993

The Bots Master is a 1993 animated series produced by Jean Chalopin through his company "Créativité et Développement" ("C&D") in France and Saban International. In total, 40 episodes were made, each one having a special 2.5D segment and titles. The series was co-produced by Avi Arad and Associates. The show also had a toyline based on it.

== Summary ==
In the year 2025 A.D., robots have become commonplace, performing menial tasks and working in industry. For that, the world can thank the young genius robotic engineer Ziv "ZZ" Zulander and the Robotic Megafact Corporation (aka RM Corp) which he works for. Ziv's creation of the "3A robot series" revolutionized the world and its application of robotics. However, RM Corp's CEO Sir Lewis Leon Paradim (aka "LLP") isn't satisfied being one of the wealthiest men in the world; he desires world domination. With his minions Lady Frenzy and Dr. Hiss, LLP plans to take control of the planet through a coup d'état using the same 3A bots that ZZ had invented to benefit humanity. Hiss creates a new chip called the "Krang Chip" which can be used to override any 3A series robot to take orders exclusively from RM Corp. ZZ learns of LLP's evil plan and decides to defect from the company, intending to stop the continued manufacture and distribution of the Krang Chips.

LLP and his cohorts originally seek to capture ZZ and attempt to convince him to switch sides, but ZZ refuses. Utilizing his A.I. robotic creations, the B.O.Y.Z.Z. (Brain Operated Young Zygoetopic Zoids), ZZ stages a robotic freedom fighting guerrilla war against RM Corps' military bots. Shortly after escaping RM Corp, ZZ rescues his sister Blitzy Zulander and takes his home and operation literally underground to avoid enemy detection. After securing his base of operations, ZZ and his BOYZZ begin their private campaign against RM Corp.

ZZ had secretly installed a special system, called "mirrors", which allows him to monitor RM Corp from within Lady Frenzy's office PC, using this information to sabotage RM Corp plans. During attempts to foil Krang Chip delivery and production, ZZ and his BOYZZ are incriminated in a series of false media reports on his rogue activities to turn public sympathy against him, and discrediting his heroic efforts as terrorism activity.

== Characters ==
=== Humans ===
==== The Zulanders ====
- Ziv "ZZ" Zulander (voiced by Mark Hildreth) – The eponymous Bots Master, Ziv is a freedom fighter and creator/leader of the Boyzz Brigade. Ziv formerly worked for RM Corp, where he developed robots until he discovered what RM Corp secretly planned to do with them. Ziv is a master of disguise and an excellent mimic, as well as a capable fighter. He has a number of technological devices built into his combat suit: anti-gravity boots and a paralyzing beam in his left forearm, but lacks the battery power for sustained use.
- Blitzy "Blitz" Zulander (voiced by Crystaleen O'Bray) – Ziv's impulsive 10-year-old sister. She tries to aid her older brother in his missions, often in the capacity of supporting fire. Though not as talented a creator as ZZ, Blitzy still proves able to assemble the Jungle Fiver modular robot with Genesix' help. She is capable of driving, but prefers to fly the VAF jet with its heavier artillery. Blitzy tends to solve tactical problems on impulse, using force rather than guile.

==== RM Corp ====
RM Corp is an organization that specializes in robotics. Ziv worked there before defecting.

- Sir Lewis Leon Paradim (voiced by Dale Wilson) – The main villain of the series. Sir Lewis Leon Paradim (or LLP for short) is the CEO of RM Corp. He vows to take over the world through Krang Chips in the first half of the series, then seeks to become President of the World in the second half.
- Dr. Hiss (voiced by Ian James Corlett) – A cyborg scientist who is the chief creator of the Corps' bots. His faith in said bots is high, though they are destroyed on a regular basis. Hiss has a personal hatred for ZZ, generally attempting to kill him outright with overwhelming firepower.
- Lady Frenzy (voiced by Janyse Jaud) – Paradim's second-in-command. She holds romantic feelings for ZZ which sometimes conflict with her loyalties to LLP and the Corp. Frenzy does not share Dr. Hiss' confidence in RM Corp's bots, and thus will generally attempt to negotiate or threaten before resorting to violence.

==== Other human characters ====
- Lonnie Chang – A news reporter and anchor who is the primary source of ZZ's bad press, although she does not seem to consider him a threat in person. Throughout the series, Chang begins to reconsider her view on ZZ.
- Alicia – A model who the Boyzz Brigade set up to date ZZ, believing him to be lonely. Their first date ends somewhat disastrously because of the Corp, but Alicia is willing to see ZZ again, despite being aware of the dangers that come from being associated with him.
- President Bando – The president of Africa. He is a political opponent of LLP in the campaign for President of the World.

=== Robots ===
==== The Boyzz Brigade ====
Short for "Brain Operated Young Zygoetopic Zoids," these robots are ZZ's allies against RM Corp.

- The Street Boyzz – A duo of construction worker-themed combatants who use construction-themed weapons and retractable roller-blades. The Street Boyzz view each other as brothers.
  - Jammerzz (voiced by Cusse Mankuma) – Jammerzz has a large jackhammer for one arm, ending in twin laser cannons at the shoulder. He enjoys battering his opponents with his jackhammer and occasionally speaks in rhyme/rap.
  - Toolzz (voiced by Stefano Giulianetti) – A four-armed Street Boyzz. He uses a wrench and drill as weapons, often dismantling the opposition rather than destroying them. Toolzz also has a small laser cannon in his arm.
- The Sports Boyzz – A team of front-line combatants who use sports-themed weapons. They use their sports skills to lob, hit, kick, drive, smash, and otherwise launch sports-ball-type explosives at the opposition.
  - All Ball – The leader of the Sports Boyzz, demonstrating expertise in volleyball and soccer. His wide-body design, while effective, gives him a comical running style.
  - Batzz – Expert in baseball, and carries a bat. The most humanoid of the Sports Boyzz in appearance.
  - Bogey (voiced by Stefano Giulianetti) – Expert in golf. His single arm acts as a golf club.
  - Ace – Expert in tennis and has a racket for a hand. Consequently, he pilots one-handed and is the only Sport Boyzz equipped with a laser.
- The Science Boyzz (Analysis-Type Bots) – Two scientist robots who serve as the group's research and development duo. They stay out of combat for the most part except for dire emergencies and usually only leave the base for intelligence/reconnaissance purposes. They are sometimes called upon to pilot Jungle Fiver when the Sports Boyzz or Street Boyzz are unable to do so.
  - D'Nerd (voiced by Terry Klassen) – A large data bank with a computer for a head. He was once captured and brought to LLP, who dismissed him as a talking dictionary.
  - Genesix (voiced by Michael Donovan) – The engineer of the Boyzz Brigade, Genesix was the original Boyzz prototype. In reference to this, his name is a play on the word "genesis".
- Other Boyzz (Stand-Alone Bots)
  - Cook (voiced by Sam Khouth) – A chef robot who usually stays at the base and cooks for the Zulanders. He has two arms, with the right arm having a rolling pin-topped arm coming out near the right elbow, a lower right spatula-tipped arm, and a lower left cooking pot-topped arm. One field mission Cook was in was where he assisted Watzon in coming up with an antidote to the pollen for a particular cactus that ZZ and Blitzy are allergic to (as seen in "Flowers For ZZ").
  - Watzon – The team doctor and a dry wit. He makes repairs to the Boyzz and administers medical aid to humans where required.
  - Ninjzz (voiced by Surya Kellar) – A three-armed ninja robot with retractable roller-blades who was modeled on the greatest martial artists, making him formidable in hand-to-hand combat. He prefers to fight with his sword or nunchaku, but sometimes uses a laser gun.
  - Kiddie – Designed possibly to serve as a playmate for Blitzy. Kiddie behaves like a young boy, but does help out on missions occasionally.
  - Momzz – A robot who was designed to act as a mother towards ZZ and Blitzy.
  - Swang – Swang acts as a reconnaissance and distractions specialist. It cannot speak normally, instead communicating with synthesized chirps which the other Boyzz Brigade can understand.
  - Twig – The largest Boyzz and ZZ's bodyguard. Twig is designed to function with ZZ's high-tech car, able to transform into a robot or fly when necessary.
- The Talking Heads – The Talking Heads (or "T-Heads") are a group of robot heads built by Genesix that sit on a shelf in ZZ's house. They usually just comment on goings-on, but occasionally are put to work helping the other Boyzz.
  - T1 – A talking green robot head with fins.
  - T2 – A pink robot head that laughs a lot.
  - T3 – A rectangular purple robot head.
  - T4 – A green robot head with eyestalks.
  - T5 – A gold-colored robot head.
- Birden and Freehand – These bots aid the team by acting as decoys against the Corp's Security Bots. Birden is a robotic bird built by Genesix who lacks an accurate navigation system, causing him to fly around randomly and cause havoc. Freehand is an arm attached to a rotor that flies around ZZ's house, usually enacting tasks for the Talking Heads.
- Jungle Fiver – The Boyzz Brigade's most powerful weapon. A group of five vehicles that can transform into their robot forms and also combine into a heavily armed giant robotic fighting machine. Jungle Fiver is upgraded later in the series to be capable of trans-lunar space travel, but is otherwise capable of atmospheric flight.
  - Half Bot – An ATV-type robot.
  - Jet Bot – A jet-type robot.
  - Tank Bot – A tank-type robot.
  - Heli Bot – A helicopter-type robot.
  - Hover Bot – A hovercraft-type robot.

=== RM Corp Bots (3A type) ===
- 3P – An enormous green robot that serves as power booster bot for "MDB".
- Beast Bot – A special-purpose canine-like robot designed by Dr. Hiss to track down ZZ.
- Green Bot – Green Bots are the Corp's standard soldier robots. They have stronger armor than Security Bots and are better armed, with a laser cannon on one arm and a set of pincers on the other, but behave in the same manner.
- Humabot – Humabots are mercenary cyborg soldiers that work for the Corp in exchange for robotic upgrades that give them enhanced strength and durability.
- Massive Destruction Bot – The Massive Destruction Bot (or MDB) is a class of robot created by Dr. Hiss. Although there are several variants, the original prototype was nicknamed "Goliath".
- Private Police Bot – Also known as "P.P.B.", these well-armed robots featuring black and purple armor are a more advanced version of the Green Bot. They are usually used for the personal protection of Corp staffers, but are occasionally dispatched for open combat when needed.
- Security Bot – Security Bots are the most common opposition ZZ and the Boyzz Brigade encounter in the first half of the series. Designed to monitor and patrol restricted areas, they have security cameras for heads and exposed joints which the Boyzz frequently exploit for dismantling.

== Episodes ==
Episode Number	Title	Airdate	Synopsis
S1.E1	Adios... ZZ	September 27, 1993	
S1.E2	Enter the Ninjzz	September 28, 1993	
S1.E3	Blitzy's BattleBots Brigade	September 29, 1993	
S1.E4	Stop that Bot	September 30, 1993	
S1.E5	Bloc 93	October 1, 1993	
S1.E6	Flowers for... ZZ	October 4, 1993	
S1.E7	Rock the Corp	October 5, 1993	
S1.E8	This Land is my Land	October 6, 1993	
S1.E9	You can Bank on it	October 7, 1993	
S1.E10	ZZ Come Back	October 8, 1993	
S1.E11	Lost	October 11, 1993	
S1.E12	Bring the Boyzz Down	October 12, 1993	
S1.E13	Spybot	October 13, 1993	
S1.E14	Climb the Mountain	October 14, 1993	
S1.E15	Assault on Bunker 435	October 15, 1993	
S1.E16	Blind Date	October 18, 1993	
S1.E17	Grasp for Power	October 19, 1993	
S1.E18	Bobby and his Bots	October 20, 1993	
S1.E19	The Weapon	October 21, 1993	
S1.E20	A Few Good Boyzzs	October 22, 1993	
S1.E21	A Tale of Two Paradims	October 25, 1993	
S1.E22	General Blitzy	October 26, 1993	
S1.E23	The Zulander Scanner	October 27, 1993	
S1.E24	Mind Gamez	October 28, 1993	
S1.E25	Island Ploy	October 29, 1993	
S1.E26	Photo Finish	November 1, 1993	
S1.E27	A Gift for Frenzy	November 2, 1993	
S1.E28	ZZ and the Law	November 3, 1993	
S1.E29	The Appointment	November 4, 1993	
S1.E30	The Duel	November 5, 1993	
S1.E31	The Bad Boyzzs are Among Us	November 8, 1993	
S1.E32	Friendly Enemy	November 9, 1993	
S1.E33	The Gift	November 10, 1993	
S1.E34	The Bots in the Booth	November 11, 1993	
S1.E35	Building Eight	November 12, 1993	
S1.E36	The Tome of Doom	November 15, 1993	
S1.E37	Friendly Frenzy	November 16, 1993	
S1.E38	Momzz	November 17, 1993	
S1.E39	Fly Me to the Moon	November 18, 1993	
S1.E40	The Setting Sun	November 19, 1993	

== Cast ==
- Ian James Corlett – Dr. Hiss
- Richard Ian Cox –
- Michael Donovan – Genesix
- Stefano Giulianetti – Toolzz, Bogie
- Mark Hildreth – Ziv "ZZ" Zulander
- Janyse Jaud – Lady Frenzy
- Surya Kellar – Ninjzz
- Sam Khouth – Cook
- Terry Klassen – D'Nerd
- Rob Lehane –
- Cusse Mankuma – Jammerzz
- Pamela Martin –
- Crystaleen O'Bray – Blitzy Zulander
- Kim Restell –
- Chelan Simmons –
- Dale Wilson – Sir Lewis Leon Paradim

== Crew ==
- Doug Parker – Voice director

== Broadcast UK history ==
- Children's BBC (1994–1999)
- The Children's Channel (1994–1997)

== Lazer time ==
In addition to the credits, every episode of the show had a short segment in 2.5D. Using a method called the Pulfrich effect, the segment was acceptable for viewers with or without the special glasses packaged with action figures based on the series. To inform viewers to wear their glasses, a character – usually Zulander – would shout, "Lazer time, boyzz!" followed by an image of the 3-D glasses on the screen. Once the 2.5D sequence was over, ZZ would call "Game Over!" and an image of the 3-D glasses appear once more on the screen, this time with a no symbol superimposed over it. For the Bots Master series the effect was produced by Nuoptix 3-D.

== Merchandise ==
In conjunction with the series, a short-lived toyline was produced under license by C&D. The line included action figures of Ziv Zulander, Doctor Hiss, and Jungle Fiver before being discontinued.

== Home video ==
Six VHS tapes were released in the 1990s, each with a single episode and the title of that episode.
