= ABC Family Worldwide =

Subsidiary of The Walt Disney Company

ABC Family Worldwide, Inc.
- Formerly: International Family Entertainment, Inc. (1990–1998); Fox Family Worldwide, Inc. (1998–2001)
- Type: Subsidiary
- Traded as: NYSE: FAM (1992–1996)
- Industry: Broadcasting
- Predecessor: Fox Kids Worldwide; Saban Entertainment
- Founded: 1990; 36 years ago
- Founder: Timothy Robertson
- Headquarters: Walt Disney Studios, Burbank, California, U.S.
- Area served: Worldwide
- Products: Teenage dramas Family broadcasting
- Parent: Haim Saban/News Corporation (1997–2001); Disney Entertainment Television (2001–present)
- Subsidiaries: BVS Entertainment; Freeform

ABC Family Worldwide is an in-name-only unit subsidiary of the Disney Entertainment business segment of the Walt Disney Company that operates American basic cable channel Freeform (previously known as ABC Family) and manages the programming libraries of BVS Entertainment.

The company was originally formed as International Family Entertainment in 1990, a spin-off of the Christian Broadcasting Network's cable network The Family Channel.

In 1993, IFE acquired the assets of defunct British ITV broadcaster Television South, whose holdings included the library of U.S. studio MTM Enterprises. In 1996, IFE was acquired by News Corporation; the MTM library was melded into 20th Century Fox Television's library, while the remainder was melded into Fox Kids Worldwide (a merger of its Fox Kids unit with Saban Entertainment), to form Fox Family Worldwide. Fox and Saban planned to leverage the popular Fox Kids lineup to turn The Family Channel (which was rebranded as the Fox Family Channel following the purchase) into a competitor to other children's and family-oriented cable channels such as Nickelodeon, Disney Channel and Cartoon Network. The subsidiary also established international Fox Kids networks in Europe and Latin America.

After facing struggling ratings and a failed attempt by Saban to buy out News Corporation's stake in the venture, Fox Family Worldwide was sold to its current owner, The Walt Disney Company, in 2001 for $5.3 billion, after which the company was rebranded as ABC Family Worldwide until 2016. The purchase gave Disney ownership of the Fox Family channel (which was subsequently rebranded as ABC Family), the international Fox Kids channels (which were later re-branded as Jetix, and then Disney Channel or Disney XD) and rights to the Saban Entertainment (now BVS Entertainment) and Fox Kids/Jetix libraries. Saban Brands would acquire the rights to some of the properties held by BVS Entertainment (the prominent ones being Power Rangers and Digimon); most of these assets have since been sold to Hasbro and absorbed into its current production studio Hasbro Entertainment.

== History ==
=== International Family Entertainment ===
The company has its origins in Pat Robertson's Christian Broadcasting Network (CBN); the religious broadcaster had re-positioned its CBN Satellite Service, which primarily carried televangelism, as the CBN Cable Network, which carried a mixture of secular programming and religious programs. Owing to its new scope, the service was later renamed the CBN Family Channel.

By the 1990s, the network had become too profitable to remain under the ownership of the non-profit CBN without legal repercussions. In January 1990, a decision was made to spin off the CBN Family Channel into a new, for-profit company known as International Family Entertainment, via a sale at a price of $250 million in convertible notes. The majority of IFE was owned by the network's management, with a 15% minority interest held by TCI Development Corporation, a subsidiary of cable provider Tele-Communications Inc. Special voting shares were issued to Pat Robertson and Timothy Robertson that gave them control of the company. IFE continued to use CBN's facilities under a rental agreement. As a stipulation of the spin-off, The Family Channel was required to maintain daily airings of CBN's flagship television program The 700 Club, a condition that has remained in effect to this day.

CBN sold $23 million in notes to another cable company. An additional $127 million of convertible notes were converted into stock prior to an IPO in April 1992, in which CBN would sell them for $93 million to $106 million worth. More shares would be sold directly by IFE in the amount of $47 million to $53 million in a total of about $150 million. IFE's proceeds would be used for programming, marketing and possible acquisitions or investments. Plans were in the works for a home video distribution deal with Pacific Arts by the end of 1992, a South Korea cable network with Hyundai Electronics Industries Co. (now SK Hynix), and a joint venture to bid for a Czechoslovak TV station. Additional plans called for Family Channels in Britain and the rest of Europe, and additional cable channels. In consideration by IFE for the cable channel's genres were game shows, westerns, country music and sports as well as Spanish-language simulcasting. On April 28, 1992, IFE began public trading on the New York Stock Exchange under the ticker FAM.

In May 1992, IFE announced plans to launch Game Channel, a joint venture with Game Technologies, which is a channel that would air original and classic game shows. The co-owners planned to allow viewers to interact with its programming over a 1-900 line; revenue was to be shared with providers that carried the channel, who could also integrate their own interactive content into the service. Upon its announcement, Game Channel already faced competition from Sony Pictures Television's upcoming Game Show Network, as well as other new cable networks launching around the same period. On June 7, 1993, The Family Channel launched a game show block with interactive segments built around its new original production Trivial Pursuit, in preparation for the planned launch of Game Channel.

In February 1993, IFE acquired the assets of Television South, a former ITV franchisee in Southern England, for $68.5 million. The deal gave IFE ownership of the library of Mary Tyler Moore's studio MTM Enterprises; IFE planned to leverage the MTM programs as part of a new syndication division, and the sale would also bolster an impending British version of The Family Channel. In June 1993, prior to its launch, IFE sold a 39% stake in The Family Channel UK to local company Flextech. The channel officially launched on September 1. Flextech would later buy out IFE's share in The Family Channel UK, which then became the game show-oriented channel Challenge.

On August 20, 1993, IFE soft-launched the Cable Health Club (later known as FitTV), a service devoted to fitness. In December 1993, IFE opened a bidding war to acquire the Nostalgia Network, competing with a partnership of Florida-based MOR Music TV Inc. and Arizona-based Gen-She Inc., and part-owner Concept Communications (owned by the Unification Church).

In December 1993, IFE purchased three Myrtle Beach, South Carolina theaters and Calvin Gilmore Productions for $20 million. The Great American Entertainment Co. was formed as a subsidiary of IFE to control the companies.

In 1994, IFE acquired Dorothy Hamill International, which had bought the ice show franchise Ice Capades out of bankruptcy. However, the company went out of business afterward due to the decreasing popularity of its shows in favor of traditional figure skating competitions and exhibitions. The tour had a lackluster season, which led Hamill to leave the company. IFE then searched for a management company to handle the touring company for an equity stake. Instead, they sold Ice Capades in late 1995 while retaining the option of reacquiring a majority stake in Del Wilber & Associates for 10 years.

By March 1995, IFE formed the Family Channel Pictures banner to produce four $8 to $12 million theatrical films per year. Amblin Television president Tony Thomopoulos was hired as MTM Entertainment's chief executive officer and would also oversee programing on The Family Channel, Family Channel Pictures, and creative aspects of Ice Capades and Great American Entertainment Company.

=== Fox Family Worldwide ===
In 1997, Fox Kids Worldwide, a company formed in 1996 via the merger of Fox Children's Network and Haim Saban's Saban Entertainment, made a bid to acquire IFE. With the growing shift in children's television from over-the-air programming blocks to cable channels such as Cartoon Network and Nickelodeon, Fox and Saban sought to launch a competitor that would carry programming from the popular Fox Kids lineup.

Viacom and Disney made competing offers for IFE; Viacom dropped out of bidding, and News Corporation offered $1.8 billion. News Corporation won with a bid of $1.9 billion. The acquisition closed on June 11, 1997; IFE was folded into Fox Kids Worldwide, which itself was renamed Fox Family Worldwide. Of the sale, Robertson stated that he "felt it was time for the Family Channel to join the consolidation that was going on in the industry." On August 15, 1998, The Family Channel was renamed Fox Family Channel; Fox continued to be subject to the mandate that The 700 Club be broadcast by the network. Rights to the MTM Enterprises library were folded into 20th Century Fox Television.

In October 1996, a Fox Kids channel was launched in the United Kingdom and Ireland, and in November, it started broadcasting in Latin America and Brazil. In November 1999, Fox Kids Europe N.V. was formed, with 75.7% being held by Haim Saban for Fox Family Worldwide, and the remainder listed on the Euronext.

In an attempt at U.S. expansion in October 1999, Fox Family spun off two digital cable channels, BoyzChannel and GirlzChannel, which contained programming content targeted at the respective genders. Both networks shut down after one year of operation due to a lack of leverage and demand by cable providers (each only had 100,000 subscribers), and a desire to invest more heavily in the parent channel.

The Fox Family channel struggled under their ownership; Saban attempted to force News Corporation to sell it its share in the joint venture, but were unable to agree in a proper valuation. The ensuing conflict resulted in the two companies deciding to sell Fox Family Worldwide to a third-party. At the time, Fox was also preparing to acquire Hughes Electronics, the parent company of television provider DirecTV.

=== Acquisition by Disney ===
On July 23, 2001, The Walt Disney Company announced its acquisition of Fox Family Worldwide. On October 24, 2001, deal was signed for $2.9 billion cash plus $2.3 billion in debt assumption, due to Fox Family Channel's 35% audience decline, which gave Disney control of the Fox Family channel (which, owing to its new ownership, was renamed ABC Family, and its parent company renamed ABC Family Worldwide), Saban Entertainment, Saban's 49.6% stake in Saban International Paris, Fox Kids' international networks in Latin America and Europe, a 76% stake in Fox Kids Europe (which operated the European networks), as well as additional cable rights to the Australian children's music series The Wiggles (which originally began airing in the U.S. on Fox Family in May 1999 before being moved to Playhouse Disney in June 2002), Major League Baseball (MLB) games that were assigned to Fox Family via the Fox Sports division (which included a slate of Thursday-night regular season games), and Division Series games. ESPN assumed the production responsibilities for these games as part of its ESPN Major League Baseball package, although they continued to air on ABC Family for the time being.

The U.S. Fox Kids block broadcast by the Fox network was not included in the sale, and its operations were shifted to the Fox Television Entertainment division. As Fox no longer held the rights to the Saban programming that primarily aired during the block, and no longer had appropriate synergies due to the sale of Fox Family, the company chose to contract the block to a third-party. Following a bidding war with DIC Entertainment, Fox subsequently announced in January 2002 that it would enter into an agreement with 4Kids Entertainment to program a new children's block for the network.

In March 2002, Angela Shapiro was named president of ABC Family Worldwide, after moving from president of Buena Vista Productions. She originally reported to ABC Broadcast Group president Steve Bornstein, who resigned in 2002. The post then reported directly to Disney president Bob Iger. In October 2003, ABC Family Worldwide was amalgamated into the ABC Cable Networks Group, run by Anne Sweeney. Shapiro also left the network that month. Later, programming executive Linda Mancuso died in December 2003. In early 2004, ABC Family's original movie production unit was taken over by Disney Channel's vice president of original programming and production Gary Marsh and vice president of original movies Michael Healy.

In January 2004, Fox Kids Europe, Fox Kids Latin America and the ABC Cable Group launched a new joint brand for their children's television operations, Jetix, which would be used to brand programming blocks which aired on ABC Family and Toon Disney, its television channels in Europe and Latin America, along with its program library and merchandising.

On December 8, 2008, Disney reached an agreement to increase its ownership in Jetix Europe to 96%, and announced an intent to purchase the remainder to give it full ownership. Following its takeover of Jetix Europe, Disney began migrating the Jetix properties in the region to a new brand, Disney XD. In 2009, Switchover Media—a company formed by the management of the Italian Jetix operation, acquired the K2 and GXT networks from Disney, and managed Jetix until its re-branding as Disney XD. Switchover would later be purchased by Discovery Communications.

On May 12, 2010, Saban Capital Group's Saban Brands bought the rights to the Power Rangers franchise back from Disney for $43 million. Rights to the then-upcoming season Power Rangers Samurai, as well as previous seasons, were acquired by Nickelodeon in 2011. In September 2012, Saban Brands also re-acquired the international rights to the Digimon franchise, partnering with MarVista Entertainment as distributor. Hasbro subsequently announced a deal to acquire Saban Brands' entertainment assets in May 2018.

On March 23, 2012, Corus Entertainment launched ABC Spark, a channel targeted towards young adults which served as a Canadian version of ABC Family. On March 24, 2012, the ABC Family division took control of Soapnet as part of the wind-down of the service in favor of Disney Junior.

On January 12, 2016, the Disney division's flagship channel, ABC Family, was renamed to Freeform.

== Corporate structure ==
ABC Family Worldwide formed the main body of the parent company and holds all subsidiaries and their assets.

- ABC Family Worldwide (parent company)
  - Freeform – TV channel and programming library; trade name of "International Family Entertainment, Inc.".
    - ProdCo Inc.
  - BVS Entertainment – Formerly Saban Entertainment; acquired in 2001 (excluding some CineGroupe co-productions and most of the foreign shows)
    - BVS International, N.V. – formerly Saban International, N.V.
    - BVS International Services Inc. – formerly Saban International Services Inc.
    - SIP Animation – formerly Saban International Paris; became independent in 1991, renamed in 2002, fully acquired by BVS in 2012 and shut down in 2023.
      - Créativité et Développement – bought by Saban in 1996; absorbed into Saban International Paris in 1998 (pre-1989 DIC Entertainment library currently held by WildBrain and select programs by DIC Audiovisual retained by Disney)
    - Jetix Europe N.V., formerly Fox Kids Europe N.V. - 73.3% stake owned by Saban/BVS beginning in 1996. Renamed in 2004, and fully purchased and absorbed into The Walt Disney Company in 2008.
      - Jetix Play – previously Fox Kids Play from 2003 to 2005; closed by 2010
      - Jetix Consumer Products – formerly Saban Consumer Products and Active Licensing Europe
    - Saban/Scherick Productions – terminated in 2001
    - Libra Pictures – Saban's adult general entertainment label, closed in 2001
    - New World Animation – closed by News Corporation in 1996; the company's assets (including in-house content from Marvel Productions and DePatie–Freleng Enterprises) were transferred to Saban Entertainment.
  - ABC Children's Network – formerly Fox Children's Network The company was responsible for Fox Kids' original programming and library
    - ABC Children's Productions, Inc. – formerly Fox Children's Productions
    - ABC Children's Music, Inc. – formerly Fox Children's Music
  - Television South – library owned by ABC Family Worldwide; TVS Television Limited remained in existence until 2018 as a wholly owned but non-trading subsidiary of Virgin Media
    - MTM Enterprises – previously owned by Television South, which was acquired by IFE in 1993; content library was transferred to 20th Century Fox, who ended program production in 1998.
  - Jetix – replacement for the Fox Kids brand worldwide since 2004; a registered trademark of The Walt Disney Company with networks owned by ABC Family Worldwide
    - Jetix Europe N.V. – formerly Fox Kids Europe N.V. (owned and operated by BVS until 2009)
    - Jetix Latin America – formerly Fox Kids Latin America
    - Jetix Asia
    - Jetix Animation Concepts (a joint venture with Disney Television Animation)
  - ABC Family Properties, Inc. – formerly Fox Family Properties, Inc.
  - ABC Family Music, Inc. – formerly Fox Family Music, Inc.
    - ABC Family Music Publishing (BMI)
    - FFM Publishing (ASCAP)
  - ABC Family Post Production LLC. – formerly Fox Family Post Production LLC.
  - ABC Family Post Production Inc. – formerly Fox Family Post Production Inc.
  - BV Family Productions, Inc. – Founded by TWDC as Wang Fang Company, Inc. in 1993; name changed in 2003

== See also ==
- American Broadcasting Company
- BVS Entertainment
- Fox Kids
- Jetix
- List of production companies owned by the American Broadcasting Company
