= SIP Animation =

French animation studio

- Final logo, used from 2002 to 2023
- Formerly: Saban Records and Music SARL, LLC (1977–1990); Saban Enterprises SARL, LLC (1990–1993); Saban International Paris SARL, LLC (1993–2002)
- Type: Société à responsabilité limitée (1982–2005); Société par actions simplifiée (2005–2023)
- Industry: Animation studio; Record label
- Founded: 1977; 49 years ago
- Founders: Haim Saban; Jacqueline Tordjman
- Defunct: 25 October 2023; 2 years ago
- Fate: Liquidated; remaining assets folded into BVS Entertainment
- Successor: The Walt Disney Company France (operations); BVS Entertainment (remaining assets)
- Headquarters: La Garenne-Colombes, France
- Number of locations: 4
- Parent: BVS Entertainment (100%, 1980–1991; 2012–2023; 49.6%, 1991–2012)
- Subsidiaries: Créativité et Développement (April 1996–December 1998)

SIP Animation, LLC (known as Saban International Paris until 2002) was a French animation studio, and a defunct subsidiary of BVS Entertainment (formerly Saban Entertainment). By 2009, the company had produced over 390 hours of animated content.

== History ==
=== Early history ===
Haim Saban and Jacqueline Tordjman formed together Saban Records and Music SARL in 1977 in order to release Saban's musical compositions. Saban later formed Saban Productions in 1980 and soon became a unit of the newly-formed company.

In 1989, the division moved into the animation field, producing animated series for their parent company under the name of Saban International Paris. The parent company was renamed Saban Enterprises by 1990.

=== Semi-independence ===
In November 1991, Saban International Paris, LLC became a separately-operated facility after its shares were divided in thirds. Luxembourg-based company International Film Productions took 49.7% stake, while CEO Jacueline Tordjman took 0.5%. Saban Entertainment kept a 49.8% share. Tordjman's shares increased to 0.7% by 1994. with Saban's decreasing to 49.6%.

In January 1996, France 3 picked up Princess Sissi as a co-production between Saban International Paris, LLC and Canadian studio CinéGroupe. In February 1996, the shares of International Film Productions were transferred to Pueblo Films AG, a Switzerland-based company.

By the late 1990s, Saban International Paris mainly functioned as a producer of original content for the publicly operating Fox Kids Europe and maintained this partnership after its rebranding as Jetix Europe.

=== Expansion ===
In March 1996, it was announced that Saban Entertainment would acquire rival French studio Créativité et Développement (C&D), which was owned by DIC Entertainment co-founder Jean Chalopin. The plan was that if the deal closed successfully, the studio would be absorbed into Saban International Paris while Saban would inherit their catalogue. In addition, with the completion of the acquisition, the C&D headquarters building in La Garenne-Colombes would become the property of Saban International Paris. The deal closed successfully, with C&D soon being liquidated in 1998.

The C&D acquisition allowed Saban International Paris to pick up the rights to produce an animated series based on Diabolik, which was added to their existing range of productions in development, which at the time included two Belgian-comic adaptations: Achille Talon and Iznogoud, the latter of which was pre-sold to France 2 for that summer, and three literature adaptations: Oliver Twist and two Michael Ende works Jim Button and Night of the Wishes. In August 1996, Saban and the German ARD network agreed to a three-year, $50 million co-production and library program licensing agreement to co-produce the Michael Ende adaptations.

In February 2000, it was announced that the in-development Night of the Wishes adaptation would be named Wunschpunsch and would be produced as a co-production with Canadian-based CinéGroupe and began production in February 2000, being pre-sold to Radio-Canada and TF1 in the same month. In September, Fox Kids Europe announced that they would co-produce two new shows with the studio - Jason and the Heroes of Mount Olympus, and Gadget & the Gadgetinis. In December, DIC Entertainment announced that they would be co-produce Gadget & the Gadgetinis with Saban International Paris and that Saban International would hold international (outside of the U.S.) distribution rights to the series, which itself would premiere in 2002.

In April 2002, Saban International Paris presold a new show tentatively titled Tofu Family (later renamed to The Tofus), to the United Kingdom's ITV to air on their CITV block. The studio were also reported to be working on three Canadian co-productions - Tinsellania for TF1 and Family in co-production with Studio B, Sparkiz for France 2 and ROBO for M6. None of the three shows were ever completed.

=== Rebranding ===
In July 2001, News Corporation and Saban Entertainment announced their sale of Fox Family Worldwide, which held Saban's assets and stakes, to The Walt Disney Company for $5.3 billion. The deal would also include Saban Entertainment and Saban's 49.6% shares in Saban International Paris. The deal was closed in October 2001, and after the sale, Saban Entertainment was renamed to BVS Entertainment. With this, Haim Saban departed from the company, while The Walt Disney Company would inherit a 49.6% minority stake in the studio, which remained under BVS.

With the departure of Haim Saban from both Saban International Paris and BVS Entertainment, the studio could no longer be referred to under the respective name. On October 1, 2002, the company was renamed to SIP Animation and soon launched a new website and a change of domain name shortly afterward. Alongside the change of name, SIP announced the production of a TV series based on the Italian comic book series W.I.T.C.H., which Disney published. Additional projects SIP continued to work on prior to the name change were Jason and the Heroes of Mount Olympus and Gadget & the Gadgetinis for Fox Kids Europe. As with Saban and Fox Kids Europe's existing programmes, television distribution and servicing were transferred from Saban International N.V. (renamed to BVS International N.V.) to Buena Vista International Television, a Disney subsidiary.

In March 2003, SIP announced that production on The Tofus had begun, and that they would co-produce the second season of CinéGroupe's What's with Andy?, in association with Fox Kids France and Super RTL. The studio also produced a W.I.T.C.H. pilot to attract broadcasters into airing the series, and announced two brand new unnamed projects under development for Fox Kids Europe, a 2D show which TF1 was looking into airing and a 2D/3D show. By this point, home video rights to SIP's catalogue fell under Active Licensing Europe, which was renamed Jetix Consumer Products during the rebranding of all Fox Kids operations as Jetix.

In September 2004, SIP and Jetix Europe announced that the planned 2D/3D show would become their next co-production, an action cartoon with the working title of The Insiders. Hasbro signed a deal to produce toys based on the show later in the month. The show's full title would eventually become A.T.O.M. - Alpha Teens on Machines, and premiered on Jetix channels worldwide in the second half of 2005. In October of the same year, Kidscreen reported that the planned 2D show would be titled Combo Niños and that delivery for the series would begin in early 2006. Jetix Europe and TF1 had been on board with the series, but SIP had also been looking for other broadcasters or countries to co-produce the series.

In December 2006, SIP made a call for short film pitches.

In May 2007, SIP Animation announced that the production of Combo Niños had begun for an August 2008 delivery window. The series premiered on Jetix Europe-operated channels in the Summer of 2008, with a terrestrial expansion soon following. Throughout 2007, SIP announced several new projects in the works, with Astaquana being picked up in September 2007 for a June 2008 start and a January 2009 delivery window, with a pilot being produced to attract consumers, George and Me being picked up in December, based on a 2006 Soleil Productions comic series, and the film Princess Bari on December 30, which was a co-production with Korean distributor M-Line and would become the first ever French-Korean animated co-production. The film was rumored to have been completed but was never released.

In April 2008, SIP refreshed their website and changed their domain name. Within 2008, the company produced three television pilots: Wesh Wesh Express, Ko-Bushi, and The Jokers. In June, it was reported that George and Me would begin production at the beginning of 2009. The studio also produced for Interfilm an eight-minute short film titled Inukshuk, which was completed in December 2008, and premiered in May 2009.

=== Dormancy, closure and legacy ===
In December 2008, The Walt Disney Company announced that they would purchase out the rest of Jetix Europe. With Disney fully purchasing their main programme supplier, SIP silently went dormant.

In April 2009, the company was subject to liquidation, and André Lacour was appointed as president by shareholders' decision. During this point, several employees of the studio would leave the company, including CEO and co-founder Jacqueline Tordjman, who would establish Zagtoon with former employee Jeremy Zag. Bruno Bianchi also left and founded Ginkgo Animation, taking the George and Me project with him. Additionally, the company changed its address to Rue de la Galmy 77776 Marne la Vallée cedex 4. As Torjman no longer held any business with the studio, Disney purchased out Tordjman's 0.7% share, now owning a 50.3% majority share in SIP.

In 2012, Disney France executive Bruno Danzel d'Aumont was appointed the head of the company by a shareholder decision. In 2012, Disney purchased out the remaining 49.7% shares held by Pueblo Films AG, making SIP Animation owned by a single company (BVS Entertainment) for the first time since 1991. Shortly afterward, the remains of the studio moved to The Walt Disney Company France headquarters at 25 Quai Panhard Levassor 75013, Paris.

In 2019, by the decision of the sole authorized shareholder BVS, current Disney France CEO Phillipe Coen was appointed as the company president.

In 2023, Disney terminated the company through BVS, the sole authorized shareholder of the company, in the last quarter of the year. SIP Animation as a whole was listed as fully closed on 25 October 2023. All remains of the studio were automatically transferred to BVS Entertainment, which was the sole authorized partner of the société anonyme in accordance with French civil code. None of the SIP assets were transferred or folded into The Walt Disney Company France.

Although, the studio was a separately operated multi-shareholder unit from its parent company BVS Entertainment between 1991 and 2012, BVS International N.V. owned the rights to "SIP Animation" respective name, logo, brand and trademark between 2002 and 2012.

== Filmography ==
=== Pilots ===
- Astaquana (2007)
- Wesh Wesh Express (2008)
- Ko-Bushi (2008)
- The Jokers (2008)

=== Short film ===
- Inukshuk (2009)

== Subsequent ownership ==
Disney owns all remaining assets of SIP as of the company's liquidation on 25 October 2023 through BVS Entertainment. As of March 2012, The Walt Disney Company France acts as a contact point for SIP and its former assets. The short film Inukshuk is distributed by interfilm.

Bruno Bianchi, who had worked at the company since the 1990s, went on to form his own animation company called Ginkgo Animation after SIP's shutdown, and ran it before his death on December 2, 2011. Ginkgo picked up the George and Me project after he left SIP, but by April 2011 this venture of Ginkgo's was considered unsuccessful due to changing priorities in the French animation industry, according to one of the authors of the original comics.

Malaysian studio Inspidea, which had previously worked as a subcontractor on Combo Niños and Wesh Wesh Express, co-produced the Ko-Bushi pilot and would eventually co-produce a full series under the slightly different title Kobushi, with the involvement of Zagtoon. Zagtoon itself was co-founded by SIP co-founder Jaqueline Tordjman and also employs several key people who worked at SIP, like composers Alain Garcia and Noam Kaniel.
