= Lists of villains =

The following is a list of lists of villains, supervillains, enemies, and henchmen.

== Lists of villains ==
=== By adversary ===
- List of Aquaman enemies
- List of Avengers enemies
- List of Batman family enemies
- List of Blue Beetle enemies
- List of Captain America enemies
- List of Daredevil enemies
- List of Dhruva enemies
- List of Dick Tracy villains
- List of Doctor Who villains
- List of Fantastic Four enemies
- List of Firestorm enemies
- List of Flash enemies
- List of Green Arrow enemies
- List of Green Lantern enemies
- List of Hawkman enemies
- List of Iron Man enemies
- List of James Bond villains
- List of Justice League enemies
- List of Justice Society of America enemies
- List of Legion of Super-Heroes enemies
- List of My Little Pony villains
- List of Ninja Turtles: The Next Mutation villains
- List of Power Rangers villains
- List of Spawn villains
- List of Spider-Man enemies
- List of Super Friends villains
- List of Superman enemies
- List of Teen Titans enemies
- List of Thor (Marvel Comics) enemies
- List of Wonder Woman enemies
- List of X-Men enemies

=== By franchise ===
- List of Ben 10 villains
- List of Buffyverse villains and supernatural beings
- List of Disney villains
- List of villains in VR Troopers

=== Other ===
- AFI's 100 Years...100 Heroes & Villains
- List of comic book supervillain debuts
- List of female action heroes and villains
- List of female supervillains
- List of horror film villains
- List of Secret Society of Super Villains members
- List of Sinister Six members
- List of real life villains
- List of soap opera villains

== See also ==
- List of superheroines
- Lists of superheroes
- List of people known as the Cruel
