= List of Power Rangers characters =

This is a list of characters in the Power Rangers universe – including Rangers, villains and supporting characters. Minor characters (including Monsters, foot soldiers, cross-over characters, and spin-off characters) may not be listed.

== A ==
- Abraham (see Wild West Rangers)
- Adam Park
- Adelle Ferguson
- Admiral Malkor (see Villains in Power Rangers Megaforce)
- Aiden Romero / Levi Weston (see List of Power Rangers Ninja Steel characters)
- Aiden Romero Robot (see List of Power Rangers Ninja Steel characters)
- Aisha Campbell
- Albert Smith (see Power Rangers Dino Charge)
- Alex Drake (see Time Force Power Rangers)
- Alice Roberts (see List of Power Rangers Time Force characters)
- Alicia (Wild West Rangers)
- Ally Samuels (see Space Patrol Delta)
- Alpha 4
- Alpha 5
- Alpha 6
- Alpha 7
- Alyssa Enrilé (see Wild Force Power Rangers)
- Amelia Jones (see Power Rangers Dino Fury)
- Andrew Hartford (see Allies in Power Rangers Operation Overdrive)
- Andros (see Space Power Rangers)
- Angela
- Angela Fairweather
- Animus (see Zords in Power Rangers Wild Force)
- Anton Mercer
- Antonio Garcia (see Samurai Power Rangers)
- Anubis "Doggie" Cruger
- Appleby
- Archerina
- Argus (see Villains in Power Rangers Megaforce)
- Artilla (see Villains in Power Rangers: Wild Force)
- Ashley Hammond (see Turbo Power Rangers)
- A-Squad Blue Ranger (see A-Squad S.P.D. Power Rangers)
- A-Squad Green Ranger(see A-Squad S.P.D. Power Rangers)
- A-Squad Pink Ranger (see A-Squad S.P.D. Power Rangers)
- A-Squad Yellow Ranger (see A-Squad S.P.D. Power Rangers)
- Astronema (see Villains in Power Rangers: In Space)
- Auric the Conqueror
- Aurico (see Aquitian Rangers)
- Automon (see Machine Empire Remnants, Villains in Power Rangers: Wild Force)

== B ==
- Baboo (see Villains in Mighty Morphin Power Rangers)
- Badonna (see List of Power Rangers Ninja Steel characters)
- Barbarax (see Villains in Power Rangers Lost Galaxy)
- Bajillia Naire
- Ben Burke (see List of Power Rangers Beast Morphers characters)
- Benglo (see Villains in Power Rangers Operation Overdrive)
- Benny (see Allies in Power Rangers: RPM)
- Betty Burke (see List of Power Rangers Beast Morphers characters)
- Bigs (see Villains in Power Rangers Megaforce)
- Billy Cranston
- Black Knight (see Villains in Power Rangers Time Force)
- Black Lance (see Villains in Power Rangers Mystic Force)
- Blake Bradley (see Ninja Storm Power Rangers)
- Blaze (see List of Power Rangers Beast Morphers characters)
- Blue Senturion
- Bluefur (see Villains in Power Rangers Megaforce)
- Boom (Space Patrol Delta)
- Boomblaster (see List of Power Rangers Dino Fury characters)
- Boomtower (see Villains in Power Rangers Dino Fury)
- Bowen (see Nick Russell, Mystic Force Power Rangers)
- Brax (see List of Power Rangers Ninja Steel characters)
- Bridge Carson (see S.P.D. Power Rangers)
- Brody Romero (see Power Rangers Ninja Steel)
- Broodwing (see Villains in Power Rangers: S.P.D.)
- Bulk (see Bulk and Skull)

== C ==
- Calindor (see Imperious, Villains in Power Rangers Mystic Force)
- Calvin Maxwell (see Power Rangers Ninja Steel)
- Cameron Watanabe (see Ninja Storm Power Rangers)
- Camille (see Villains in Power Rangers Jungle Fury)
- Caplan (see Minor characters of Power Rangers)
- Captain Logan (see Minor characters of Power Rangers)
- Captain Mitchell (see Minor characters of Power Rangers)
- Captain Mutiny (see Villains in Power Rangers Lost Galaxy)
- Carlos Vallerte (see Turbo Power Rangers)
- Carnisoar (see Villains in Power Rangers Jungle Fury)
- Carter Grayson (see Lightspeed Rescue Power Rangers)
- Casey Rhodes (see Jungle Fury Power Rangers)
- Cassidy Agnes Cornell (see Allies in Power Rangers: Dino Thunder)
- Cassie Chan (see Turbo Power Rangers)
- Cestria (see Minor characters of Power Rangers)
- Cestro (see Aquitian Rangers)
- Chad Lee (see Lightspeed Rescue Power Rangers)
- Charlie (see A-Squad Red Ranger, A-Squad S.P.D. Power Rangers)
- Chase Randall (see Power Rangers Dino Charge)
- Charlie "Chip" Thorn (see Mystic Force Power Rangers)
- Cheetar (see Villains in Power Rangers Operation Overdrive)
- Chloe Ashford (see Power Rangers Hyperforce)
- Choobo (see Villains in Power Rangers Ninja Storm)
- Circuit (see Allies in Power Rangers Time Force)
- Clare the Gatekeeper (see Allies in Power Rangers Mystic Force)
- Cole Evans (see Wild Force Power Rangers)
- Colonel Mason Truman (see Allies in Power Rangers: RPM)
- Commander Anubis "Doggie" Cruger
- Commander Shaw (see List of Power Rangers Beast Morphers characters)
- Commander Stanton (see Allies in Power Rangers Lost Galaxy)
- Conner McKnight (see Dino Thunder Power Rangers)
- Corcus (see Aquitian Rangers)
- Corporal Hicks (see Allies in Power Rangers: RPM)
- Cosmo Royale (see List of Power Rangers Ninja Steel characters)
- Councilor Brody (see Allies in Power Rangers Lost Galaxy)
- Crazar (see Villains in Power Rangers Operation Overdrive)
- Creepox (see Villains in Power Rangers Megaforce)
- Cruise (see Beast Bots, List of Power Rangers Beast Morphers characters)
- Curio (see Villains in Power Rangers Dino Charge)
- Cyber Cam (see Minor characters of Power Rangers)
- Cybervillain Blaze (see Villains in Power Rangers Beast Morphers)
- Cybervillain Roxy (see Villains in Power Rangers Beast Morphers)

== D ==
- D.E.C.A. (see Allies in Power Rangers: In Space and Allies in Power Rangers Lost Galaxy)
- Daggeron (see Mystic Force Power Rangers)
- Dai Shi (see Villains in Power Rangers Jungle Fury)
- Damaras (see Villains in Power Rangers Megaforce)
- Damon Henderson (see Galaxy Power Rangers)
- Dana Mitchell (see Lightspeed Rescue Power Rangers)
- Danny Delgado (see Wild Force Power Rangers)
- Dark Specter (see Villains in Power Rangers: In Space)
- Darkonda (see Villains in Power Rangers: In Space)
- David Truehart
- Dax Lo (see Operation Overdrive Power Rangers)
- Dayu (see Villains in Power Rangers Samurai)
- Deker (see Villains in Power Rangers Samurai)
- Delphine (see Aquitian Rangers)
- Devin Del Valle (see Allies in Power Rangers: Dino Thunder)
- Deviot (see Villains in Power Rangers Lost Galaxy)
- Devon Daniels (see Power Rangers Beast Morphers)
- Diabolico (see Villains in Power Rangers Lightspeed Rescue)
- Dillon (see RPM Power Rangers)
- Dimitria (see Minor characters of Power Rangers)
- Divatox (see Villains in Power Rangers Turbo)
- Dominic Hargan (see Jungle Fury Power Rangers)
- Doomwing (see Villains in Power Rangers Dino Charge)
- Dr. K (see Allies in Power Rangers: RPM)
- Dr. Katherine "Kat" Manx (see Space Patrol Delta)
- Dr. Lani Akana (See Power Rangers Dino Fury )
- Dr. Michael Zaskin (see Allies in Power Rangers Time Force)
- Dr. Viktor Adler (see Master Org, Villains in Power Rangers Wild Force)
- Dulcea (see Minor characters of Power Rangers)
- Dustin Brooks (see Ninja Storm Power Rangers)

== E ==
- Ecliptor (see Villains in Power Rangers: In Space)
- Edward "Eddie" Banks XXV (see Power Rangers Hyperforce)
- Edward Cormier (see Allies in Power Rangers: Dino Thunder)
- Elgar (see Villains in Power Rangers Turbo and Villains in Power Rangers: In Space)
- Elizabeth "Z" Delgado (see Z Delgado, S.P.D. Power Rangers)
- Elsa (see Villains in Power Rangers Dino Thunder)
- Emily (see Samurai Power Rangers)
- Emily Lester (see Power Rangers Zeo)
- Emma Goodall (see Megaforce Power Rangers)
- Emperor Gruumm (see Villains in Power Rangers: S.P.D.)
- Emperor Mavro (see Villains in Power Rangers Megaforce)
- Eric McKnight (see Minor characters of Power Rangers)
- Eric Myers
- Ernie (see Mighty Morphin Power Rangers, see Power Rangers Megaforce)
- Ethan James (see Dino Thunder Power Rangers)
- Eugene Skullovitch (see Skull, Bulk and Skull)
- Evox (see Venjix, List of Power Rangers Beast Morphers characters)

== F ==
- Farkas Bulkmeier (see Bulk, Bulk and Skull)
- Finster (see Villains in Mighty Morphin Power Rangers)
- Flit (see Villains in Power Rangers Jungle Fury)
- Flurious (see Villains in Power Rangers Operation Overdrive)
- Flynn McAllistair (see RPM Power Rangers)
- Fowler Birdy (see Supreme Commander Fowler Birdy, Space Patrol Delta)
- Fran (see Allies in Power Rangers: Jungle Fury)
- Frax (see Villains in Power Rangers Time Force)
- Fred Kelman
- Fresno Bob (see The Cartels, Minor Villains in Power Rangers RPM)
- Fuchsia O'Hara (see Wild West Rangers, Minor characters of Power Rangers)
- Furio (see Villains in Power Rangers Lost Galaxy)
- Fury (see Villains in Power Rangers Dino Charge)

== G ==
- Gakko (see The Five Fingers of Poison, List of Power Rangers Jungle Fury characters)
- Galvanax (see List of Power Rangers Ninja Steel characters)
- Game Master (Power Rangers Hyperforce)
- Gasket (see Prince Gasket, Machine Empire)
- Gekkor (see Villains in Power Rangers Mystic Force)
- Gem (see RPM Power Rangers)
- Gemma (see RPM Power Rangers)
- General Burke (see List of Power Rangers Beast Morphers characters)
- General Crunch (see Villains in Power Rangers RPM)
- General Havoc (see Villains in Power Rangers Turbo)
- General Shifter (see Villains in Power Rangers RPM)
- General Tynamon (see List of Power Rangers Ninja Steel characters)
- General Venjix (see Machine Empire Remnants, Villains in Power Rangers: Wild Force)
- Gerrok (see Machine Empire Remnants, Villains in Power Rangers: Wild Force)
- Gia Moran (see Megaforce Power Rangers)
- Gluto (see Villains in Power Rangers Time Force)
- Goldar
- Gosei (see Allies in Power Rangers Megaforce)
- Grace Sterling (see Power Rangers (Boom! Studios))

== H ==
- Havoc (see General Havoc, Villains in Power Rangers Turbo)
- Hayley Foster (see Power Rangers Ninja Steel)
- Hayley Ziktor (see Allies in Power Rangers: Dino Thunder)
- Heckyl (see Villains in Power Rangers Dino Charge)
- Hekatoid (see Villains in Power Rangers Mystic Force)
- Helicos (see Villains in Power Rangers: Wild Force)
- Hexuba (see Villains in Power Rangers Lost Galaxy)
- High Councilor Renier (see Allies in Power Rangers Lost Galaxy)
- Horrid King (see Power Rangers (Boom! Studios))
- Hunter Bradley (see Ninja Storm Power Rangers)
- Hydro Hog (see Villains in Mighty Morphin Power Rangers)

== I ==
- Imperious (see Villains in Power Rangers Mystic Force)
- Impus (see Impus/Prince Olympius, Villains in Power Rangers Lightspeed Rescue)
- Isabella "Izzy" Garcia (Power Rangers Dino Fury)
- Itassis (see Villains in Power Rangers Mystic Force)
- Ivan Ooze (see Villains in Mighty Morphin Power Rangers)

== J ==
- J-Borg (See Power Rangers Dino Fury )
- Jack Landors (see S.P.D. Power Rangers)
- Jack Thomas (see Power Rangers Hyperforce)
- Jake Holling (see Megaforce Power Rangers)
- James Navarro (see Power Rangers Dino Charge)
- Jamie Gilmore
- Jane Fairview (See Power Rangers Dino Fury )
- Jarrod (see List of Power Rangers Jungle Fury characters)
- Jason Lee Scott
- Javier "Javi" Garcia (see Power Rangers Dino Fury)
- Jax (see Beast Bots, List of Power Rangers Beast Morphers characters)
- Jayden Shiba (see Samurai Power Rangers)
- Jayden's father (see Allies in Power Rangers Samurai)
- Jellica (see Villains in Power Rangers Jungle Fury)
- Jennifer "Jen" Scotts
- Jenji (see Allies in Power Rangers: Mystic Force)
- Jerome Stone (see Lieutenant Jerome Stone)
- Ji (see Mentor Ji, Allies in Power Rangers Samurai)
- Jindrax (see Villains in Power Rangers: Wild Force)
- Jinxer (see Villains in Power Rangers Lightspeed Rescue)
- Joel Rawlings (see Lightspeed Rescue Power Rangers)
- Joseph "Joe" Shih (see Power Rangers Hyperforce)
- Juggelo (see Villains in Power Rangers: Wild Force)
- Justin Stewart

== K ==
- Kai Chen (see Galaxy Power Rangers)
- Kamdor (see Villains in Power Rangers Operation Overdrive)
- Kapri (see Villains in Power Rangers Ninja Storm)
- Karone
- Katherine Hillard
- Kat Manx
- Katie Walker (see Time Force Power Rangers)
- Keeper (see Power Rangers Dino Charge)
- Kegler (see Villains in Power Rangers Lost Galaxy)
- Kelly Halloway (see Minor characters of Power Rangers)
- Kelsey Winslow (see Lightspeed Rescue Power Rangers)
- Kendall (see Allies in Power Rangers Wild Force)
- Kendall Morgan (see Power Rangers Dino Charge)
- Kendrix Morgan (see Galaxy Power Rangers)
- Kevin (see Samurai Power Rangers)
- Kilobyte (see Villains in Power Rangers RPM)
- Kimberly Hart
- King Mondo (see Machine Empire)
- Kira Ford (see Dino Thunder Power Rangers)
- Kired (see Mut-Orgs, Villains in Power Rangers: Wild Force)
- Kite (see Animus, Zords in Power Rangers Wild Force)
- Kiya Watanabe (see Lothor)
- Klank (see Machine Empire)
- Koda (see Power Rangers Dino Charge)
- Koragg the Knight Wolf (see Villains in Power Rangers Mystic Force)
- Kyle (see Allies in Power Rangers Ninja Storm)

== L ==
- Lauren Shiba (see Samurai Power Rangers)
- Leanbow (see Mystic Force Power Rangers)
- Leelee Pimvare (see Allies in Power Rangers: Mystic Force)
- Leo Corbett
- Lerigot (Turbo: A Power Rangers Movie)
- Levira (see Villains in Power Rangers Megaforce)
- Lieutenant Jerome Stone
- Lily Chilman (see Jungle Fury Power Rangers)
- Lokar (see Villains in Mighty Morphin Power Rangers)
- Loki (see Villains in Power Rangers Lightspeed Rescue)
- Lord Arcanon (see Villains in Power Rangers Dino Charge)
- Lord Drakkon (see Power Rangers (Boom! Studios))
- Lord Draven (see Villains in Power Rangers Ninja Steel)
- Lord Zedd
- Lothor
- Louie Kaboom (see Machine Empire)
- Lucas Kendall (see Time Force Power Rangers)

== M ==
- Machina (see Queen Machina, Machine Empire)
- Mack Hartford (see Operation Overdrive Power Rangers)
- Madame Odius (see List of Power Rangers Ninja Steel characters)
- Madison Rocca (see Mystic Force Power Rangers)
- Magma (see Villains in Power Rangers Mystic Force)
- Magna Defender
- Magnificence (see Omni, Villains in Power Rangers S.P.D.)
- Maligore (see Villains in Power Rangers Turbo)
- Malkor (see Admiral Malkor, Villains in Power Rangers Megaforce)
- Mama D. (see Villains in Power Rangers Turbo)
- Mandilok (see Villains in Power Rangers: Wild Force)
- Marah (see Villains in Power Rangers: Ninja Storm)
- Marina (see List of Power Rangers Lightspeed Rescue characters)
- Marvin "Marv" Shih (see Power Rangers Hyperforce)
- Master (see Master Vile, Villains in Mighty Morphin Power Rangers, see Master Org, Villains in Power Rangers: Wild Force, see The Master, Villains in Power Rangers: Mystic Force, see The Pai Zhuq Masters, see Master Xandred, Villains in Power Rangers Samurai)
- Master Finn (see the Pai Zhuq Masters, Allies in Power Rangers: Jungle Fury)
- Master Guin (see the Pai Zhuq Masters, Allies in Power Rangers: Jungle Fury)
- Master Lope (see the Pai Zhuq Masters, Allies in Power Rangers: Jungle Fury)
- Master Mao (see the Pai Zhuq Masters, Allies in Power Rangers: Jungle Fury)
- Master Org (see Villains in Power Rangers: Wild Force)
- Master Phant (see the Pai Zhuq Masters, Allies in Power Rangers: Jungle Fury)
- Master Rilla (see the Pai Zhuq Masters, Allies in Power Rangers: Jungle Fury)
- Master Swoop (see the Pai Zhuq Masters, Allies in Power Rangers: Jungle Fury)
- Master Vile (see Villains in Mighty Morphin Power Rangers)
- Master Xandred (see Villains in Power Rangers Samurai)
- Matoombo (see Villains in Power Rangers Mystic Force)
- Max Cooper (see Wild Force Power Rangers)
- Maya (see Galaxy Power Rangers)
- Mayor Daniels (see List of Power Rangers Beast Morphers characters)
- Megahorn (see Villains in Power Rangers Mystic Force)
- Megan (see List of Power Rangers Beast Morphers characters)
- Mentor Ji (see Allies in Power Rangers Samurai)
- Merrick Baliton
- Mesogog (see Villains in Power Rangers Dino Thunder)
- Messenger (see Villains in Power Rangers Megaforce)
- Metal Alice (see Villains in Power Rangers Megaforce)
- Mia Watanabe (see Samurai Power Rangers)
- Mick Kanic (see List of Power Rangers Ninja Steel characters)
- Mig (see Villains in Power Rangers Operation Overdrive)
- Mike (see Samurai Power Rangers)
- Mike Corbett
- Miratrix (see Villains in Power Rangers Operation Overdrive)
- Miss Alicia (see Wild West Rangers, Minor characters of Power Rangers)
- Moltor (see Villains in Power Rangers Operation Overdrive)
- Mondo (see King Mondo, Machine Empire, or Mondo the Magician, Villains in Mighty Morphin Power Rangers)
- Monty (see List of Power Rangers Beast Morphers characters)
- Mora / Morgana (see Mora/Morgana, Villains in Power Rangers: S.P.D.)
- Mordant (see Villains in Mighty Morphin Power Rangers)
- Morphin Masters (See Power Rangers Dino Fury)
- Morticon (see Villains in Power Rangers Mystic Force)
- Motodrone (see Villains in Power Rangers Ninja Storm)
- Mr. Burley (see Allies in Power Rangers Megaforce)
- Mr. Caplan (see Minor characters of Power Rangers)
- Mr. Collins (see Allies in Power Rangers Time Force)
- Ms. Appleby (see Minor characters of Power Rangers)
- Muriel Reeves (see List of Power Rangers Beast Morphers characters)
- Mucus (see Villains in Power Rangers Dino Fury)
- Mutiny (see Captain Mutiny, Villains in Power Rangers Lost Galaxy)
- Mystic Mother (see Allies in Power Rangers: Mystic Force)

== N ==
- Nadira (see Villains in Power Rangers Time Force)
- Naja (see The Five Fingers of Poison, List of Power Rangers Jungle Fury characters)
- Nate Silva (see Power Rangers Beast Morphers)
- Nayzor (see Villains in Power Rangers: Wild Force)
- Necrolai (see Villains in Power Rangers Mystic Force)
- Nick Russell (see Mystic Force Power Rangers)
- Niella (see Allies in Power Rangers: Mystic Force)
- Nikolai Chukarin (see Power Rangers (Boom! Studios)
- Ninjor
- Noah Carver (see Megaforce Power Rangers)
- Norg (see Villains in Power Rangers Operation Overdrive)
- Nova Ranger (see S.P.D. Power Rangers)
- Nulleye (see List of Power Rangers Dino Fury characters)

== O ==
- Octomus (see The Master, Villains in Power Rangers Mystic Force)
- Octoroo (see Villains in Power Rangers Samurai)
- Oculous (see Villains in Power Rangers Mystic Force)
- Officer Tate
- Olivia Cook (see Power Rangers (Boom! Studios)
- Ollie Akana (see Power Rangers Dino Fury)
- Olympius (see Impus/Prince Olympius, Villains in Power Rangers Lightspeed Rescue)
- Omni (see Villains in Power Rangers: S.P.D.)
- Onikage (see Villains in Power Rangers: Wild Force)
- Orbus (see Machine Empire)
- Orion (see Megaforce Power Rangers)
- Orisonth (see Power Rangers (Boom! Studios)
- Orria (see List of Power Rangers Dino Fury characters)

== P ==
- Phantom Ranger
- Phenomenus (see Professor Phenomenus, Minor characters in Power Rangers)
- Philips (see Allies in Power Rangers Time Force)
- Phineas (see Allies in Power Rangers: Mystic Force)
- Piggy (see Space Patrol Delta)
- Poisandra (see Villains in Power Rangers Dino Charge)
- Porto (see Villains in Power Rangers Turbo)
- Preston Tien (see Power Rangers Ninja Steel)
- Prince Gasket (see Machine Empire)
- Prince Olympius (see Impus/Prince Olympius, Villains in Power Rangers Lightspeed Rescue)
- Prince Phillip III (see Power Rangers Dino Charge )
- Prince Sprocket (see Machine Empire)
- Prince Vekar (see Villains in Power Rangers Megaforce)
- Princess Archerina (see Machine Empire)
- Princess Shayla
- Princess Viera (see List of Power Rangers Ninja Steel characters)
- Principal Randall (see Elsa, Villains in Power Rangers Dino Thunder)
- Professor Cog (see Villains in Power Rangers Samurai)
- Professor Phenomenus (see Minor characters of Power Rangers)
- Psycho Black (see Psycho Rangers)
- Psycho Blue (see Psycho Rangers)
- Psycho Pink (see Psycho Rangers)
- Psycho Red (see Psycho Rangers)
- Psycho Yellow (see Psycho Rangers)

== Q ==
- Quarganon (see Villains in Power Rangers Time Force)
- Queen Adriyel (see Power Rangers (Boom! Studios)
- Queen Bansheera (see Villains in Power Rangers Lightspeed Rescue)
- Queen Machina (see Machine Empire)

== R ==
- Randall (see Elsa, Villains in Power Rangers Dino Thunder)
- Ransik (see Villains in Power Rangers Time Force)
- Rantipede (see The Five Fingers of Poison, List of Power Rangers Jungle Fury characters)
- Ravi Shaw (see Power Rangers Beast Morphers)
- Reaghoul (see Villains in Power Rangers Dino Fury)
- Redbot (see List of Power Rangers Ninja Steel characters)
- Redker (see The Imperial Guard, List of Power Rangers Megaforce characters)
- Retinax (see Villains in Power Rangers: Wild Force)
- Riley Griffin (see Power Rangers Dino Charge)
- Ripcon (see List of Power Rangers Ninja Steel characters)
- Rita Repulsa
- Rito Revolto (see Villains in Mighty Morphin Power Rangers)
- Robert "R.J." James (see Jungle Fury Power Rangers)
- Robo Knight (see Megaforce Power Rangers)
- Robo-Blaze (see Villains in Power Rangers Beast Morphers)
- Robo-Roxy (see Villains in Power Rangers Beast Morphers)
- Rocko (see Wild West Rangers)
- Rocky DeSantos
- Rofang (see Mut-Orgs, Villains in Power Rangers: Wild Force)
- Ronny Robinson (see Operation Overdrive Power Rangers)
- Rose Ortiz (see Operation Overdrive Power Rangers)
- Ryan Mitchell (see Lightspeed Rescue Power Rangers)
- Rygog (see Villains in Power Rangers Turbo)
- Ryjack (see Villains in Power Rangers Beast Morphers)

== S ==
- S.O.P.H.I.E. (see List of Power Rangers S.P.D. characters)
- Sam
- Sam Scott (see Power Rangers)
- Santaura (see List of Power Rangers Dino Fury characters)
- Sarah Thompson (see Power Rangers Ninja Steel)
- Schuyler "Sky" Tate
- Scorch (see Villains in Power Rangers Jungle Fury)
- Scorpina (see Villains in Mighty Morphin Power Rangers)
- Scorpius (see Villains in Power Rangers Lost Galaxy)
- Scott Truman (see RPM Power Rangers)
- Scrozzle (see Villains in Power Rangers Beast Morphers)
- Sculpin (see Villains in Power Rangers Mystic Force)
- Sensei Kanoi Watanabe (see Allies in Power Rangers Ninja Storm)
- Sentinel Knight (see Allies in Power Rangers Operation Overdrive)
- Sergeant Silverback (see Space Patrol Delta)
- Serpentina (see Villains in Power Rangers Mystic Force)
- Serrator (see Villains in Power Rangers Samurai)
- Shane Clarke (see Ninja Storm Power Rangers)
- Shayla (see Princess Shayla, Minor characters in Power Rangers)
- Shelby Watkins (See Power Rangers Dino Charge )
- Shimazu (see Villains in Power Rangers Ninja Storm)
- Singe (See Villains in Power Rangers Dino Charge)
- Sir Ivan of Zandar (See Power Rangers Dino Charge)
- Sizzurai (see List of Power Rangers Dino Fury characters)
- Skull (see Bulk and Skull)
- Sledge (See Villains in Power Rangers Dino Charge)
- Slyther (see List of Power Rangers Dino Fury characters)
- Smash (see Beast Bots, List of Power Rangers Beast Morphers characters)
- Snapper (see Villains in Power Rangers Jungle Fury)
- Snide (See Villains in Power Rangers Dino Charge)
- Snow Prince (see Allies in Power Rangers: Mystic Force)
- Solon (See Power Rangers Dino Fury)
- Spencer (see Allies in Power Rangers Operation Overdrive)
- Spike Skullovitch (see Allies in Power Rangers Samurai)
- Sprocket (see Prince Sprocket, Machine Empire)
- Squatt (see Villains in Mighty Morphin Power Rangers)
- Steel (see Power Rangers Beast Morphers)
- Steelon (see Machine Empire Remnants, Villains in Power Rangers: Wild Force)
- Stingerella (see The Five Fingers of Poison, List of Power Rangers Jungle Fury characters)
- Summer Landsdown (see RPM Power Rangers)
- Supreme Commander Fowler Birdy (see Space Patrol Delta)
- Sydney "Syd" Drew (see S.P.D. Power Rangers)

== T ==
- T.J. Johnson (see Turbo Power Rangers)
- Takach (see Mut-Orgs, Villains in Power Rangers: Wild Force)
- Tally (see Allies in Power Rangers Ninja Storm)
- Tanya Sloan
- Tarrick (see Villains in Power Rangers Dino Fury)
- Taylor Earhardt (see Wild Force Power Rangers)
- Tenaya 7 (see Tenaya, Villains in Power Rangers RPM)
- Tenaya 15 (see Tenaya, Villains in Power Rangers RPM)
- Tensou (see Allies in Power Rangers Megaforce)
- Terrence "Smitty" Smith (see Zeltrax, Villains in Power Rangers Dino Thunder)
- Tezzla (see Machine Empire Remnants, Villains in Power Rangers: Wild Force)
- Theo Martin (see Jungle Fury Power Rangers)
- Thrax (see Villains in Power Rangers Operation Overdrive)
- Tideus (see Aquitian Rangers)
- Toady (see The Five Fingers of Poison, List of Power Rangers Jungle Fury characters)
- Toby Slambrook (see Allies in Power Rangers: Mystic Force)
- Tom Oliver (see Villains in Mighty Morphin Power Rangers)
- Tommy Oliver
- Tori Hanson (see Ninja Storm Power Rangers)
- Toxica (see Villains in Power Rangers: Wild Force)
- Trakeena (see Villains in Power Rangers Lost Galaxy)
- Treacheron (see Villains in Power Rangers Lost Galaxy)
- Trek / Psycho Green (see Power Rangers (Boom! Studios)
- Trent Fernandez (see Dino Thunder Power Rangers)
- Trey of Triforia
- Trini Kwan
- Trip (see Time Force Power Rangers)
- Triskull (see Villains in Power Rangers Lightspeed Rescue)
- Troy Burrows (see Megaforce Power Rangers)
- Tyler Navarro (see Power Rangers Dino Charge)
- Tyzonn (see Operation Overdrive Power Rangers)

== U ==
- Udonna (see Mystic Force Power Rangers)

== V ==
- Vargoyle (see List of Power Rangers Beast Morphers characters)
- Vasquez (see Allies in Power Rangers: RPM)
- Vella (see Allies in Power Rangers: Operation Overdrive)
- Venjix (see General Venjix, Machine Empire Remnants, see Villains in Power Rangers RPM)
- Verto (see Power Rangers (Boom! Studios)
- Vesper Vasquez (see Power Rangers Hyperforce)
- Vexacus (see Villains in Power Rangers Ninja Storm)
- Victor Vincent (see List of Power Rangers Ninja Steel characters)
- Vida Rocca (see Mystic Force Power Rangers)
- Viktor Adler (see Master Org, Villains in Power Rangers: Wild Force)
- Villamax (see Villains in Power Rangers Lost Galaxy)
- Vrak (see Villains in Power Rangers Megaforce)
- Vypra (see Villains in Power Rangers Lightspeed Rescue)

== W ==
- Waldo "Dustin" Brooks, (see Dustin Brooks, Ninja Storm Power Rangers)
- Warden Garcia (See Power Rangers Dino Fury )
- Wesley "Wes" Collins (see Time Force Power Rangers)
- Whiger (Villains in Power Rangers Jungle Fury)
- White Dino Ranger Clone (see Villains in Power Rangers Dino Thunder)
- White Knight (see list of Power Rangers Time Force characters)
- White Stranger (see Wild West Rangers)
- Will Aston (see Operation Overdrive Power Rangers)
- William (see Wild West Rangers)
- Willie (see Allies in Power Rangers Wild Force)
- Wreckmate (see List of Power Rangers Dino Fury characters)
- Wrench (see Villains in Power Rangers Dino Charge)

== X ==
- Xander Bly (see Mystic Force Power Rangers)
- Xandred (see Master Xandred, Villains in Power Rangers Samurai)

== Z ==
- Z Delgado (see Power Rangers S.P.D.)
- Zack Taylor
- Zayto (see Power Rangers Dino Fury)
- Zeltrax (see Power Rangers Dino Thunder)
- Zen-Aku (see Power Rangers Wild Force)
- Zenowing (see Power Rangers Dino Charge)
- Zhane
- Ziggy Grover (see Power Rangers RPM)
- Zika (see Power Rangers: Lost Galaxy)
- Zoey Reeves (see Power Rangers Beast Morphers)
- Zordon
- Zurgane (see Power Rangers Ninja Storm)
