= Dustin Brooks =

Dustin Brooks is a character of two TV series:

- Dustin Brooks (Power Rangers Ninja Storm) from Power Rangers Ninja Storm.
- Dustin Brooks (Zoey 101) from Zoey 101.
