= Lists of superheroes =

This is a list of lists of superheroes in fiction.

== By ethnicity or nationality ==
- List of Asian superheroes
- List of black superheroes
- List of Filipino superheroes
- List of Jewish superheroes
- List of Latino superheroes
- List of Native American superheroes
- List of Russian superheroes
- List of United States–themed superheroes

== Other ==
- List of female superheroes
- List of superhero teams and groups

== See also ==
- List of heroes (disambiguation)
- Lists of villains
