= List of heroes =

List of heroes may refer to:

- List of mortals in Greek mythology
- Lists of superheroes
- List of Heroes characters
