= Power Rangers: Super Legends =

2007 video game

- Developers: Artificial Mind & Movement (PlayStation 2, Microsoft Windows); Handheld Games (Nintendo DS)
- Publisher: Disney Interactive Studios
- Series: Power Rangers
- Platforms: Nintendo DS; PlayStation 2 Microsoft Windows
- Release: October 26, 2007: Nintendo DS; NA: October 26, 2007; EU: November 2, 2007; AU: November 15, 2007 PlayStation 2, Windows; NA: November 6, 2007; EU: November 9, 2007; AU: November 29, 2007
- Genre: Action-adventure
- Modes: Single-player, multiplayer

Power Rangers: Super Legends - 15th Anniversary is a 2007 action-adventure game based on the television franchise Power Rangers. It was released in 2007 for the Nintendo DS, PlayStation 2, and Microsoft Windows. A GameCube version was also announced alongside the other versions, but was never released.

== Synopsis ==
=== PlayStation 2, PC ===
Long thought to have been purified by Zordon's energy wave at the end of Power Rangers in Space, Lord Zedd has reappeared in his old form. Concealed in a hidden dimension, he is interfering with the time stream, trying to alter the course of history to destroy every Power Ranger throughout time. Operating from the Hall of Legends, the new/Future Omega Ranger (confused with the original one and himself) must gather a force of Power Rangers and artifacts from across time to break through into Zedd's hidden dimension and restore the timeline.

=== Nintendo DS ===
Emperor Gruumm has set his sights upon the myth of the Hall of Legends, the resting place of the collected energies of Power Rangers across time. In his twisted mind, he envisioned a world where his enemy's power is not only stolen but used against them and to make him a living God over all creation. The Omega Ranger, aware of all timelines from within the Hall of Legends, discovers his plan and warns the Power Rangers to stand against it. For should the Hall of Legends fall into Gruumm's hands, all would be lost.

== Gameplay ==
The game marks an anniversary gathering of selectable Power Rangers from fifteen seasons of the series, from Mighty Morphin Power Rangers to Power Rangers Operation Overdrive, from Rangers to Megazords (only the Dino Thunder and Mystic Force seasons are not represented). There are 16 playable characters on the Nintendo DS and 21 on the PlayStation 2 and PC.

== Reception ==
Reception

Aggregate score
Aggregator	Score		
Aggregator	DS	PC	PS2
Metacritic	44/100	N/A	38/100

Review scores
Publication	Score		
Publication	DS	PC	PS2
GameZone	6.7/10	N/A	N/A
IGN	4/10	N/A	N/A
Jeuxvideo.com	11/20	6/20	6/20
PALGN	3/10	N/A	4/10

The DS and PlayStation 2 versions received "unfavorable" reviews according to the review aggregation website Metacritic.
