= List of Power Rangers Ninja Storm characters =

Power Rangers Ninja Storm is the 2003 Power Rangers season that tells the story of the fight between the Wind Ninja Rangers and the evil Space Ninjas led by Lothor.

== The Power Rangers ==
This generation of Power Rangers were originally two separate teams: the Wind Rangers and the Thunder Rangers. After initial hostilities, they banded together and were later joined by the Green Samurai Ranger.

During the events of "Shattered Grid," when summoned by Zordon, the entire Ninja Storm team appears, including the Thunder Rangers and Cameron. This would indicate that Drakkon had yet to invade their universe prior to Zordon's summons.

=== Wind Rangers ===
The Wind Rangers are the only Wind Ninja Academy students who were not kidnapped by Lothor, having been late on the day of the attack. They were given their morphers by Sensei Kanoi Watanabe and his son Cam after the attack on the school. The Wind Rangers possess several power independent of their ranger powers, including superhuman speed and agility.

==== Shane Clarke ====
Shane Clarke (Pua Magasiva) is the Red Wind Ranger. He is the leader of the Ninja Storm team. Shane is an excellent skateboarder. Shane is trained in air based fighting techniques. Shane commands the Hawk Ninja Zord, and his specialized weapon is the Hawk Blaster. When he was young, Shane saved a Carminian woman named Skyla from the bounty hunter, Vexacus. In the two part episode, "Shane's Karma", Skyla returned and gave Shane the power of the Battlizer armor. Shane has an older brother, Porter (played by Pua Magasiva's actual brother, Robbie Magasiva). After Lothor's defeat, Shane became an instructor at the Wind Ninja Academy.

When Lothor comes back in Power Rangers Dino Thunder, Shane temporarily becomes evil alongside his teammates. They battle the Dino Rangers, but are set free by their comrades. The Ninja and Dino Rangers then batte Lothor and Mesogog's combined forces, with him teaming up with Red Dino Ranger Conner.

Afterwards, the Wind Rangers lose their Ranger powers again, though they would later regain them through unknown means in order to join the Ranger army in Power Rangers Super Megaforce.

==== Tori Hanson ====
Tori Hanson (Sally Martin) is the Blue Wind Ranger. Tori is the only woman in the Ninja Storm team. She is notable for being the first female Blue Ranger in Power Rangers history. Tori has an affinity for water, surfing in her spare time. She studied water based fighting techniques at the Wind Ninja Academy. As the Blue Ranger, Tori pilots the Dolphin Zord, and her specialized weapon is the Sonic Fin. Tori is considered the most responsible in the Wind Rangers trio. It is implied throughout the series that Tori has romantic feelings for Blake. While their feelings are clearly reciprocal, the two never officially date. Tori also becomes an instructor at the Wind Ninja Academy after Lothor's defeat.

When Lothor returns in Power Rangers Dino Thunder, Tori temporarily becomes evil alongside her teammates. They are set free by Cam, Blake and Hunter. The Ninja and Dino Rangers then team up to battle Lothor and Mesogog's combined forces. Afterwards, the Wind Rangers lose their powers, leaving things to the next generation.

In the Power Rangers Operation Overdrive team up episode "Once a Ranger", Tori is called upon by the Sentinel Knight along with Adam Park, Kira Ford, Bridge Carson, and Xander Bly to relieve the Operation Overdrive Rangers when they lost their powers. Sentinel Knight restored her powers, and she later fought alongside the Overdrive Rangers. It is also revealed that Tori now runs her own surf shop.

Her powers apparently either remained intact or were later restored again, as she took part in the final battle with the Armada in Power Rangers Super Megaforce.

==== Dustin Brooks ====
Waldo 'Dustin' Brooks (Glenn McMillan) is the Yellow Wind Ranger. He is the second male Yellow Ranger after Tideus, the Yellow Alien Ranger. Dustin trained in earth based fighting techniques. Dustin pilots the Lion Ninja Zord and his specialized weapon is the Lion Hammer. Dustin is a motocross rider and works at the bike store, Storm Chargers. He is somewhat naive and gullible, having been duped by Hunter and Blake, as well as Marah on multiple occasions.Dustin and Marah seemed to harbor interest in each other, but nothing was ever expanded on. Alongside Shane and Tori, Dustin graduates from the Wind Academy and stays on as a teacher.

When Lothor comes back in Power Rangers Dino Thunder, Dustin temporarily becomes evil alongside his teammates. They battle the Dino Rangers, but are set free by their comrades. The Ninja and Dino Rangers then battle Lothor and Mesogog's combined forces. Afterwards, Dustin's powers are lost but he continues on as a teacher in the Wind Ninja Academy.

He apparently regained his powers when he joined the Ranger army in Super Megaforce.

=== Thunder Rangers ===
The Thunder Rangers: Hunter Bradley (left) and Blake Bradley (right).

The Crimson and Navy Rangers are the only known Rangers from the Thunder Ninja Academy. Hunter (Crimson Ranger) and Blake (Navy Rnager) are adoptive brothers who were chosen by Sensei Omino when their academy was attacked by Lothor. Blake and Hunter are initially hostile to the Wind Rangers and are working for Lothor because they believe Sensei Watanabe killed their parents. It is eventually revealed that Lothor is actually responsible for the death of Blake and Hunter's parents. After this revelation, Blake and Hunter decide to leave Blue Bay Harbor, unsure of themselves and their destiny as Rangers.

Blake and Hunter return in 'Return of Thunder', now with the resolve to kill Lothor. Unfortunately, Blake and Hunter are brainwashed into joining Lothor once again, leading to several battles between the Wind and Thunder rangers. Eventually, the Wind Rangers are able to break them of Lothor's spell. Afterwards, Blake and Hunter decide to fight alongside the Wind Rangers to defeat Lothor.

Their weapons are Thunder Staffs, which can also transform into the Tornado Star (a boomerang weapon), Thunder Shield (a hoop weapon), or can extend into long staffs, to attack their enemies.

==== Hunter Bradley ====
Hunter Bradley is the Crimson Thunder Ranger played by Adam Tuominen and voiced by Scott McShane in the Power Rangers: Super Legends video game. He is the older brother of Blake Bradley, the Navy Thunder Ranger. Hunter pilots the Crimson Insectizord and his specialized weapon is the Crimson Blaster. Initially brooding and standoffish, Hunter eventually learns the value of friendship and teamwork outside of himself. In the series finale, Hunter becomes the head instructor at the Thunder Academy.

When Lothor returned from the Abyss of Evil during Power Rangers Dino Thunder, Hunter teamed up with Blake and Cam to recover the Thunder and Samurai Powers from the Abyss. They freed the mind-controlled Wind Rangers, and teamed up with the Dino Rangers to face Lothor and Mesogog's combined forces. After the battle, Hunter discovered that his rangers powers had been depleted, thus ending his time as a Power Ranger. He continued on as the head teacher at the Thunder Ninja Academy, later taking up the Ranger mantle again when an army of Rangers was formed to assist the Megaforce Rangers in Power Rangers Super Megaforce.

The Crimson Ranger's arsenal included his Thunder Staff, the Crimson Blaster, the Crimson Tsunami Cycle, and the Ninja Glider Cycle, a special motorbike adapted to transform into a motor-propelled glider. His Power Spheres included the Spin Blade and pieces of the MiniZord and the Ninja Firebird and the Sting Blaster.

==== Blake Bradley ====
Blake Bradley (Jorgito Vargas, Jr.) is the Navy Thunder Ranger. He is voiced by Kenn Michael in the Power Rangers: Super Legends video game. He is the younger brother of Hunter Bradley, the Crimson Thunder Ranger. More sociable and charming than his older brother, Blake is a skilled motorbike racer. He pilots the Navy Beetle zords, and his specialized weapon is the Navy Antler. It is implied throughout the series that Blake has romantic feelings for Tori. While their feelings are clearly reciprocal, the two never officially date. His Ranger powers are drained by Lothor using Cam's amulet and are seemingly lost when Lothor is sealed within the Abyss of Evil. At the end of the series, he joins Factory Blue to become a professional motocross racer.

In Dino Thunder, the Thunder Rangers temporarily regain their powers and fight alongside the Dino Thunder Rangers to defeat the combined threat of Lothor and Mesogog. After the battle, Blake's morpher is depleted, resulting in the loss of his Ranger powers. Despite this, he would appear as part of the Ranger army in Super Megaforce.

Blake's weapons include a Navy Antler, Thunder Staff, and a Thunder Blade. His gear includes a Thunder Morpher and a Tsunami Cycle. He shared the Serpent Sword Power Sphere with Hunter for their Thunder Megazord.

=== Cameron "Cam" Watanabe ===
Cameron "Cam" Watanabe (Jason Chan) is the Green Samurai Ranger. He is the son of Sensei Kanoi Watanabe and Miko. He is also Lothor's nephew through his father's side. Kanoi made a promise to Cam's mother that Cam would never be trained in the ways of the ninja. As such, Cam was not a student at the Wind Ninja Academy, but he was a constant presence and usually at his father's side. Unable to train, he began putting his talents to use in the technological arena.

After the Wind Academy was destroyed by Lothor, Cam took Shane, Tori, and Dustin to Ninja Ops. Under instruction from Sensei Watanabe, he (reluctantly) presented the three with Wind Morphers, allowing them to become the Wind Rangers.

Throughout the series, Cam used his skills to construct/maintain power spheres, Zords, and weapons for the Rangers. Early on, Cam often displayed a sarcastic personality and low opinion towards Shane, Tori and Dustin. Besides their faulty track record in training, Cam was also jealous that they got to be Rangers and not him. Despite shown to be a competent fighter, Sensei Watanabe's promise prevented Cam from becoming a ranger (over the protests of the other rangers). Throughout the series, Cam began to change his opinion towards Shane, Tori, and Dustin as they proved him wrong time and time again. Eventually he became good friends with them, and he began to see them as great Rangers and great ninjas.

In "The Samurai's Journey, Part I", the Rangers' powers were stolen, leaving earth defenseless. When Sensei mentioned a great power source lost to time, Cam used the Scroll of Time to travel into the past to retrieve it. He arrived at the Wind Ninja Academy when his father, Kanoi, was a student. Surprisingly, he also met an unmentioned twin brother named Kiya as well as a mystery samurai revealed to be Miko, his mother. Miko possessed the Samurai Amulet, which Cam recognized as the great power source he came back for. However, Kiya also wanted the amulet and attempted to frame Cam for stealing the amulet. Kanoi exposed Kiya's plot – leading to a fight between Cam and his future uncle, who had knowledge of the dark ninja arts. Cam won and successfully claimed the amulet. Kiya was stripped of name and rank, and banished from Earth. Before he was off-world, Cam witnessed Kiya take the name "Lothor" and vow revenge. Cam was unable to do anything to change history as he had to return home. Miko let him keep the amulet, allowing Cam to become the Green Samurai Ranger and use the Samurai Star Megazord to save the present.

As the Samurai Ranger, Cam was the sixth and final Power Ranger on the team. Due to the demands of Ranger life, he created a holographic virtual duplicate of himself dubbed "Cyber-Cam" to take over day-to-day running of the dojo. Cyber-Cam was given a "thug" persona, with wardrobe and vocabulary to match, and was highly skilled in extreme sports. Cyber-Cam briefly kidnapped Cam, so he could enjoy life. Cam later reprogrammed him to be focused on work in Ninja Ops, though the "thug" persona and wardrobe remained.

It is noted that after the events of "Samurai's Journey," Lothor began to pick on Cam more than the other Rangers. This could be because Cam is his nephew and because Cam was indirectly responsible for Lothor's banishment. Lothor did know it was Cam, as he later recalled their "meeting in the past".

Notably, Cam is the only Ninja Storm Ranger not to be turned evil, like the Thunder Rangers ("Return of Thunder") and later the Wind Rangers ("Thunder Storm").

When Lothor was finally defeated, Cam again became an advisor at the Wind Ninja Academy, helping the other Rangers in their instructor duties, and keeping a special watch over Lothor's nieces (his cousins), Marah and Kapri, who had reformed and enrolled at the academy. Within a year time, he got closer to the girls and shared a bonding moment.

When Lothor escaped from the Abyss of Evil in Power Rangers Dino Thunder, Cam later briefly regained his samurai powers and re-teamed with his fellow Ninja Rangers, as well as teaming up with the Dino Rangers, to battle the combined forces of Lothor and Mesogog, in which he teamed up with White Dino Ranger Trent. After the battle, it was revealed that Cam's morpher was fully depleted resulting in the permanent loss of his Ranger powers.

However, a means of restoring them-at least temporarily-was apparently found, as he joined the Ranger army in battling the Armada forces that invaded Earth. He would later join his teammates in the final battle with the Armada forces in Power Rangers Super Megaforce.

== Allies ==
=== Sensei Kanoi Watanabe ===
Sensei Kanoi Watanabe (Grant McFarland as an adult and as a guinea pig, Daniel Sing as a teen) is the mentor of the Wind Rangers and father to Cameron Watanabe. Kanoi Watanabe was originally an air ninja and is also the twin brother of Kiya Watanabe/Lothor. He is also proficient in Earth Style. When Lothor attacked the Wind Academy, he used his magic to turn Sensei Watanabe into a guinea pig, albeit with the ability to speak and bipedal movement. Kanoi sensed potential in the three students who became the Wind Rangers. He also sensed it in his son Cam but had promised his wife before her death that he would not train Cam in the ways of the Ninja.

The Sensei of the alternate dimension that Tori ended up in was also evil like the Ninja Rangers.

Kanoi was eventually restored to human form when Lothor raided Ninja Ops when hit by Lothor's energy attack. Following Lothor's defeat, Kanoi returned to the Wind Academy.

Some time later in Power Rangers Dino Thunder, Kanoi was captured and impersonated by a vengeful Lothor (who had escaped from the Abyss of Evil). Kanoi later escaped with the help of his nieces Marah and Kapri, and helped Cam and the Thunder Rangers recover their powers from the Abyss of Evil. He then worked together with Hayley to advise the Rangers in their team-up battle.

=== Kelly Halloway ===
Kelly Halloway (Megan Nicol) is the owner of Storm Chargers, a sporting goods store that the Power Rangers frequent and where Dustin is an employee. Her counterpart in the alternate dimension that Tori visited had a goth-like appearance and was the boss of Zurgane and Choobo.

=== Cyber-Cam ===
Cyber-Cam (Jason Chan) is a holographic virtual duplicate of himself he dubbed "Cyber-Cam" to take over day-to-day running of the dojo and maintenance of the equipment. Cyber-Cam has the opposite personality of real Cam. Cyber-Cam briefly kidnapped Cam so he wouldn't have to work, but was later reprogrammed him to be focused on work in Ninja Ops.

=== Kyle, Eric and Tally ===
A trio of teens resembling Shane, Dustin and Tori, respectively. They first appeared to back up Cam and Hunter while fighting a Kelzak army. They were not seen again until the Wind Ninja Academy opened again, enrolling as ninja apprentices. Cam got worried about the continual stress he will go through especially with Eric and his friends. His father assured him to leave their training to Shane, Dustin, and Tori.

Eric was the identical twin brother of Conner McKnight the Red Dino Ranger. Both were portrayed by James Napier. (Note: According to Conner in the "Legacy of Power" episode of Power Rangers Dino Thunder, he was kicked out of the Academy and didn't graduate. Unlike Conner, Eric was described as laid back and airheaded.)

== Evil Space Ninjas ==
=== Lothor ===
Born Kiya Watanabe, Lothor (portrayed by Grant McFarland as an adult, Daniel Sing as a teenager) is an exiled evil ninja master. His history is revealed during the "Samurai's Journey" three-parter. When Cam Watanabe travels back in time to acquire a great power source, he meets younger versions of his parents and learns of an unheard uncle, Kiya. Kiya is shown to be loose with the rules, in contrast to his twin brother, Kanoi. However, nobody expected Kiya to seek to steal the Samurai Amulet (the great power source) from Cam's mother. Attempting to frame Cam, his plan was foiled and exposed by Kanoi, who discovered him using dark ninja powers. After Cam defeated Kiya in combat, the sensei of the academy banished Kiya from Earth to the farthest parts of space where his evil powers will do no harm. Cam realizes the truth, as Kiya proclaims before being banished, "I will take the name of the ancient warrior of evil. From this point, I will be known as Lothor! … I will not forget the part you played in this, brother! I will have my revenge!" As a student at the Wind Ninja Academy, he wore a yellow and black uniform, implying that he studied under the Earth element.

Lothor spent years in space to slowly build an army. He intended to conquer Earth and destroy all the protecting ninja academies with their ninja masters, allowing him to become the ultimate dark ninja master. He also first encountered the bounty hunter, Vexacus, and developed an intense rivalry with him. He also apparently married during his exile, as his nieces Kapri and Marah were not blood relatives and only were related by marriage, though no wife was ever seen or otherwise alluded to. Before his attack on Earth in the first episode, Lothor killed the Bradleys, the adoptive parents of Hunter and Blake though the circumstances of their deaths are unknown.

Upon attacking Earth, Lothor seemingly targeted the Thunder Ninja Academy first. He captured the Thunder Ninja students and Sensei Omino, and even managed to convince Hunter and Blake Bradley that Sensei Watanabe was responsible for their adoptive parents' deaths. The Wind Ninja Academy was the next target. Again, Lothor kidnapped the students of the academy. When they were fighting, Sensei Watanabe turned himself into a guinea pig.

Lothor's victory was short-lived, and he soon realized that three students had escaped the purge of the Wind Ninja Academy (Shane, Dustin, and Tori). Being the only three remaining, they were presented with morphers, allowing them to become Wind Power Rangers. These new Power Rangers foiled Lothor's plans on numerous occasions, and he has sent monstrous warriors after them, but they all fail. Nevertheless, he has always stuck by the evil code for destroying a Power Ranger, that "they must be in their true Ranger form.". Lothor has a campy sense of humor, which is often reflected from his frustrations with his monsters/nieces when they fail to best the Power Rangers, or in some predictable occasions (e.g. after making a monster grow, he stares at the camera and asks the audience if they really expected him to make it smaller.) Such fourth wall breaking manifested itself in several other of Lothor's asides (in the season finale, piloting the final giant robot the Rangers would fight, he comments on the battle was the most fun he'd had all season.) as well.

In the final episodes of the series, treason and betrayal among Lothor's generals saw them all dying off - at each other's hands or at the hands of the Power Rangers. It was soon revealed that these deaths had all been a part of Lothor's great plan, and that when each had died, their spirits had gone to the "Abyss of Evil". With the help of Cam's stolen Samurai Amulet, Lothor was able to make the Abyss overflow and the dead generals and armies were all released, free to destroy the world. Shane was quickly able to destroy the resurrected generals with his Battlizer while the other Rangers tossed the other monsters back into the Abyss. Lothor then managed to use Cam's Samurai Amulet to drain the Rangers of their Ranger powers. Fortunately, Shane, Dustin and Tori were able to use their inner ninja powers to seal him and his deceased army in the Abyss of Evil, saving the planet.

In "A Wild Wipeout", Tori is transported to an alternate dimension where Lothor is the Mayor of Blue Bay Harbor while the Power Rangers terrorize the residents. Lothor fears these evil Power Rangers but, at Tori's urging, comes to his senses and works with his allies and Tori to defeat the evil Ninja Rangers.

Almost a year later in Power Rangers Dino Thunder episode "Thunder Storm," Lothor escapes from the Abyss of Evil and again captures the ninja students. Impersonating his brother, he lures the Wind Ninja Rangers to a beach where he tricks them into accepting new morphers which make them evil. They are eventually freed by the Thunder Rangers and Cam, who have managed to retrieve their old powers. Lothor then teams up with Mesogog, Dino Thunder's main antagonist. After a battle with both Ninja Storm and Dino Thunder, in which both their warriors are defeated, Lothor sends Marah and Kapri to battle against the rangers as a last effort to win. However, he finds out too late both girls had double crossed him. Especially when Lothor sees the rescued Ninja Students freed, along with Marah and Kapri bonding with Cam. Feeling like the alliance is no longer needed, Mesogog fights Lothor and ends up trapping him in a glass jar. Mesogog's Island Base was destroyed a few months later with the final fate of Lothor left unresolved. As he is not seen again, it is most likely that Lothor was destroyed in Mesogog's Island Base.

=== Zurgane ===
Zurgane (voiced by Peter Rowley) is the main general in Lothor's army. He is an alien that resembles a samurai. Zurgane enjoys destroying everything in the service of Lothor. (Note: He is actually a small alien ant-like creature that controls the much larger samurai-like robotical suit as revealed in the toyline and Ninpu Sentai Hurricanger, but this was never shown on the series. His name is a slightly altered version of his Japanese counterpart's name: Sargain.)

Even though the Thunder Rangers were on Lothor's side at the time, he envied them, for they got the glory and attention that he wanted from Lothor. He is always mocked by his crewmates because he doesn't have a mouth nor eyes. Zurgane is known to be Lothor's technical advisor as he fixes objects on the ship and builds his own evil Zords and even uses robotic monsters. Zurgane's powers are teleportation, energy projection, and the ability to extend swords from his shoulders.

An alternate dimension that Goldwinger had Tori transported to had Zurgane with the personality that the normal Choobo has where both of them worked at Storm Chargers. He is among those who help Mayor Lothor fight the evil Ninja Rangers.

Zurgane was destroyed by Vexacus, another of Lothor's generals. Vexacus sought absolute power over Lothor's forces, and later collaborated with Marah and Kapri to destroy Motodrone and Shimazu. After the destruction of Zurgane's latest Zord by the Power Rangers, Zurgane is physically in bad shape. Vexacus took advantage of that in order to perform a sneak attack, destroying him. When the Abyss was open Zurgane returned, only to be destroyed again by Shane.

He had later returned again from the reopened Abyss in Power Rangers Dino Thunder. He first appeared inside the Abyss with a small pack of monsters to prevent Cam and the Thunder Rangers from reclaiming the Samurai Amulet and left them to fall to their doom after a brief battle. He returned to the surfaced to serve Lothor and was partnered with Elsa of Mesogog's army. He fought against the Thunder Rangers and Tommy Oliver who destroyed him the third time with his Brachio Staff's Energy Orb attack.

=== Choobo ===
Choobo (voiced by Bruce Hopkins in the TV series and by David Lodge in the Power Rangers: Super Legends video game) is the lieutenant of Lothor's army. He resembles a Ōnyūdō/frog-themed monster wearing mountain-climbing equipment with a mustache and green reptilian skin. He wielded a white and red-striped staff and has a Mama's boy-like personality. He can summon energy spheres from his fridge-like backpack to trap his enemies. Sometimes, he uses monsters based on animals. He could also control his opponents' bodies like puppets and suck them into his backpack and send them into his own pocket dimension inside it where he would appear as a giant head that breathed smelly gas.

He was promoted to general when he captured the Thunder Rangers and manipulated them to oppose the Wind Rangers again. However, he failed to destroy the Rangers when the Thunder Rangers realized they were being manipulated. Because of this, Choobo was banished from Lothor's ship. He swore revenge, and stole a Scroll of Empowerment, which gave him great strength and power when it enlarged him. He was defeated by the Thunderstorm Megazord, but saved by Lothor and shrunk down to be Marah's new pet. Lothor later restored him to normal accidentally.

An alternate dimension that Goldwinger sent Tori to had Choobo smarter than Zurgane where both of them worked at Storm Chargers. He is among those who help Mayor Lothor fight the evil Ninja Rangers.

Choobo was defeated by Shane as the Red Battlized Ranger although it was not quite clear if he was completely destroyed (he was only seen falling down after being blasted by the Battilizer's lasers).

Choobo later appears in the video game Power Rangers: Super Legends.

=== Motodrone ===
Motodrone (voiced by Craig Parker) was originally Perry, a motorcycle expert who was conducting an experiment to create a new generation of motorcycle. Unfortunately, there was an accident and he became the scorpion-like cyborg Motodrone. Hunter destroyed Motodrone and freed Perry with his newly acquired Ninja Glider Cycle. Motodrone was later rebuilt and revived by Lothor by transferring the soul of a Kelzak.

Motodrone wielded a double-bladed staff, rode on a motorcycle, and wore a brown cloak when he was revived. Motodrone then fought the Power Rangers under the command of Lothor.

An alternate dimension that Goldwinger transported Tori to had Motodrone as the aid of Mayor Lothor. He is among those who help Mayor Lothor fight the evil Ninja Rangers.

He was later destroyed by Vexacus when he attempted to reveal Vexacus' treacherous agenda to Lothor. He came back once more from the Abyss, but was quickly defeated one final time by Shane (although like the other generals, it was not revealed if he was completely destroyed since he was only seen falling down after being blasted).

=== Vexacus ===
Vexacus (voiced by Michael Hurst) is a shark-like alien bounty hunter and the "sworn enemy" and rival of Lothor, who ended up working for Lothor whilst plotting against him. Vexacus wielded a jagged scimitar sword and a tessen fan, and could summon a giant "land shark" mecha. On some occasions, he would use monsters that are Phantom Beast-themed.

He first comes to Earth hunting Skyla, a Carminian who can give her powers to someone when she dies. He fails in his attempt to capture these powers, and ends up stranded when his ship is shot down after being defeated by Shane Clarke with his Red Wind Battlizer.

Vexacus becomes Lothor's head general, and often clashes with Zurgane.

An alternate dimension that Goldwinger sends Tori to on Vexacus' orders had that dimension's Vexacus as a good guy. He is among those who help Lothor fight the evil Ninja Rangers.

Vexacus' feud with Zurgane advances to a point where, after Zurgane's Hyper Zurganezord is destroyed, Vexacus kills him – the first part of a plan to destroy all the other generals and take over from Lothor. He later takes out Motodrone and attempts the same with Shimazu, while teaming up with Marah and Kapri to take down Lothor. However, the final two-parter revealed he had been deliberately set up by Lothor to destroy all the generals in order to overload the Abyss of Evil; Marah and Kapri, who had been in on Lothor's plan, arranged for Vexacus' destruction in battle with the Rangers (taking the Thunder Megazord with him).

He returns again after the Abyss is opened, but is quickly defeated and destroyed by Shane.

=== Shimazu ===
Shimazu (voiced by Jeremy Birchall) is a statue that contains the reincarnation of an evil clown/peafowl-like Japanese warlord legend. (Note: His name may be derived from the Shimazu clan.) He was brought to life accidentally during a battle between Cam, the Green Samurai Ranger, and Motodrone, due to Motodrone's reanimated energy. He joined Lothor's army (where Lothor gave Shimazu the power of speech) and unleashed three creatures called Wolfblades. Though the Rangers defeated him, he remained a part of Lothor's army for the remainder of the series. There was a rare occasion if he were to be seen with a body part-inspired monster.

Shimazu also appears in the alternate dimension that Goldwinger sent Tori to. He helps Mayor Lothor fight the evil Ninja Rangers.

Shimazu, along with Vexacus, plotted to take control of Lothor's ship, but he was eventually betrayed. He later teamed up with Marah and Kapri, who at the time seemed to be masterminds, having concealed their genius. They used him to try to destroy the Rangers in their Zords. However, after the Zords were destroyed by the Rangers, Marah and Kapri destroyed him, having been working for Lothor throughout.

Shimazu returned from the Abyss of Evil in the finale episode, and was quickly defeated again by the Red Wind Ranger (although it wasn't revealed if he was completely destroyed).

=== Marah and Kapri ===
Marah (portrayed by Katrina Devine) and Kapri (portrayed by Katrina Browne) are sisters and the nieces of Lothor by marriage. Exactly who Lothor marries to gain this relation is never made clear, but their parents allowed them to stay with Lothor during his quest for power.

Though they are both stereotypically foolish, Marah is rather more ditzy than Kapri, who is meaner and more scornful. Marah and Kapri constantly tried to prove to their uncle that they were evil enough to be in his army, and frequently showed each other up and the other generals in order to do so. Most often, Lothor considered them pests at best. Kapri used Lothor's PAM (Personal Alien Manager) to summon monstrous warriors from across the galaxy, and also to increase them to massive size with the Scroll of Empowerment.

On one occasion, Marah was apparently kicked out of Lothor's army when her old friend Beevil upstaged her. Miserable, she gained the trust of Dustin to defeat Beevil. In the end, however, it was revealed to be part of a deception to make Beevil more powerful. Beevil was destroyed, but Lothor and the other villains nonetheless congratulated Marah for betraying Dustin. Marah appeared to be regretful of it, having seemingly developed romantic feelings for Dustin. Despite this, she claimed that she was indeed evil.

An alternate dimension that Goldwinger sent Tori to had that dimension's Marah and Kapri working as hippies. They even help Mayor Lothor fight the evil Ninja Rangers. After the Ninja Rangers were defeated and made to renounce their evil ways, Marah and Kapri suggested to Tori to return to her dimension the same way that she came into their dimension.

Towards the end of the series, Marah and Kapri appeared to have hidden depths when they apparently arranged for Lothor's generals to overthrow him. It appeared that they were masterminds, merely hiding behind their ignorance, but this was soon revealed to be a ploy by Lothor himself. He was using them to destroy all of his own generals, and add their power to the Abyss of Evil, which would overflow and destroy the world. When their usefulness was at its end, though, Lothor betrayed them too and left them aboard the Dark Ship as it was about to explode. This led to them helping to free the captive Ninja Students and paved the way for their redemption. When they begin training at the Wind Ninja Academy, Marah was seen in a ninja suit with an orange stripe (presumably meaning fire) and Kapri in a similar one with a pink stripe (presumably meaning ice). In Power Rangers Dino Thunder, though shocked by Lothor's return, Marah and Kapri tricked him into letting them rejoin his cause. They show their true colors in helping free both Sensei Watanabe and the Ninja Students. Both Kapri and Marah share a bonding moment with Cam, while Lothor watches on in disgust after realizing he had been duped. This leads to him and Mesogog to fight against one another.

Kapri's powers include teleportation, clothes transformation, energy projection, martial arts skills and shielding. She can project ice frost, control her sword while attacking her enemies, and can blow her enemies away with her breath. Marah's powers consist of energy projection, combat techniques, shielding, flight, clothes transformation, and weapon-hand extension, martial arts skills and teleportation.

=== Kelzaks ===
The Kelzaks are Lothor's foot soldiers. They have black bodies, black pony-tails, and red Serpent-faces. They normally domesticate swords and clubs as weapons.

In "The Wild Wipeout," the Kelzaks are shown to be co-existing with humans alongside known monsters. Some Kelzaks help Mayor Lothor and his allies fight the Evil Ninja Rangers.

==== Kelzak Furies ====
The Kelzak Furies resemble the Kelzaks, but they have red bodies and are more powerful and harder to beat.

=== Evil Ninja Rangers ===
When Tori got teleported to an alternate dimension by Goldwinger in "The Wild Wipeout", she discovered that the counterparts of her fellow Rangers and Sensei Kanoi are evil while the counterparts from Lothor (who was the Mayor of Blue Bay Harbor), his nieces and generals, the Kelzaks, and the monsters up to this episode were good where they were interacting with Blue Bay Harbor's citizens. After being unable to get Mayor Lothor to help deal with the evil Ninja Rangers, Tori tried to fight them only to be overwhelmed. With Tori receiving the last minute help of Mayor Lothor and his allies, the evil Ninja Rangers were defeated and forced to renounce their evil ways. (Note: The Evil Ninja Rangers are the second Evil Ranger group, the first ones are the Psycho Rangers.)

=== Monsters ===
These are the monsters used by Lothor and his minions. The monsters are adapted from the monsters that appeared in Ninpuu Sentai Hurricaneger. To make a monster grow, Lothor would have the Scroll of Empowerment descend to Earth and emit energy that would enlarge the monster. When a monster is defeated, they end up in the Abyss of Evil.

- Blue Face (voiced by Craig Parker) – A mantis monster.
- Mad Magnet (voiced by Craig Parker) – A cybernetic spider/magnet monster that can magnetize and de-magnetize anything.
- Copybot (voiced by Jason Hoyte) – A chameleon monster that can create shadow clones of anyone, and speaks only in rhymes.
- Terramole (voiced by Mark Wright) – A cybernetic mole/drill monster.
- Amphibidor (voiced by Mark Wright) – A cybernetic frog/boiler monster.
- Florabundicus (voiced by Cal Wilson) – A hibiscus monster.
- Snipster (voiced by Jeremy Birchall) – A cybernetic rabbit/scissors monster that has the ability to cause conflict between people.
- Toxipod (voiced by John Leigh) – A snail monster.
- Super Toxipod (voiced by John Leigh) – A snail monster that is stronger than the original Toxipod.
- Bopp-A-Roo (voiced by Mark Wright) – A cybernetic kangaroo/roulette monster with talents on boxing, electric blasts, fire punches, and water blasts. He tends to speak in made up words.
- General Trayf (voiced by Greg Johnson) – General Trayf is a pig monster with pot-themed armour and a dao sword that was recruited by Zurgane to use his powers against the Rangers.
- Madtropolis (voiced by Dallas Barnett) – Madtropolis is an eye-inspired monster that looks like he has a city on his head. He was sent to steal the power from the Power Rangers. He is able to create illusions that the Rangers must overcome.
- Hip Hopper – A cicada monster.
- Tentacreep – An octopus monster with telescopic tentacles.
- Starvark (voiced by Jorge Vargas) – A tapir/baku monster with fire magic, a katana sword, and a monk's spade.
- Skyscrapper – A cybernetic amoeba/blast furnace monster with a sword fixed on one hand.
- Magic Moustache – A catfish monster with a staff.
- Sucker (voiced by Dene Young) – A teeth-inspired mosquito monster whose bite can slowly turn anyone into a human/insect hybrid.
- Fragra (voiced by Penny Ashton) – A hand-inspired perfume monster. She can trap people in perfume bottles.
- Mr. Ratwell (voiced by Mark Wright impersonating Paul Lynde) – A cybernetic rat/Cupid monster.
- DJ Drummond (voiced by Michael Hurst) – A cybernetic taiko-themed monster with electric eel heads instead of hands.
- Beevil (voiced by Lori Dungey) – A cybernetic bee monster who was a friend of Marah.
- Footzilla (voiced by Joel Tobeck) – A one-eyed foot-themed coil spring monster in a foot-shaped mask. He gains a start and stamps which enable control of people's gravity.
- Slob Goblin (voiced by Joel Tobeck) – A tongue-inspired monster in mailbox-like armor.
- "Morty Board" – A cybernetic mushroom/stationery monster.
- Wolfblades – Three wolf monsters conjured by Shimazu. They come in black, brown, and white. The three Wolfblades can combine into a three-faced Wolfblade called the Wolfblade Conglomerate.
- Goldwinger (voiced by Glen Drake) – A cybernetic moth monster that has a device on him that enables him to heal any wound. In addition, he has a dust that can send anyone to an alternate dimension.
- "Bald Loser" - A nose-inspired comedian monster who was previously defeated by Rangers.
- Inflatron (voiced by Dene Young) – An ear-inspired balloon monster.
- Eyezak – A fear-inducing scorpion monster with tentacles for arms. (Note: In Hurricanger, this monster is the final form of Motodrone's Japanese equivalent.)
- Condortron – A robotic condor/Yatagarasu-themed monster built by Vexacus.
- Bakeneko Monster – A Bakeneko-themed monster.
- Qilin Monster – A Qilin-like monster.
