= List of Power Rangers S.P.D. characters =

Power Rangers S.P.D. is the 2005 season of Power Rangers that tells the story of the fight between the Power Rangers of the Space Patrol Delta police force and the Troobian Empire in the year 2025.

== Main characters ==
=== B-Squad ===
The B-Squad are a group of Power Ranger cadets who work for Space Patrol Delta (S.P.D.) and were originally meant to serve as back-up for S.P.D.'s A-Squad. After the latter group disappear, the B-Squad are promoted to Ranger status and tasked with protecting the fictional New Tech City and Earth from the Troobian Empire. Moreover, due to their parents' work in founding S.P.D., the team developed superpowers.

==== Jack Landors ====
Jack Landors is the S.P.D. Red Ranger and the leader of B-Squad who possesses intangibility and was originally a homeless, street thief with his best friend Z before volunteering to join S.P.D. Initially taking his new position lightly, he gradually becomes a capable and effective leader despite his tendency to bend the rules and challenge his superiors. Additionally, he develops an uneasy yet respectful understanding with his teammate Sky Tate. After defeating the Troobian Empire, Jack leaves S.P.D. to conduct volunteer work with a civilian named Ally.

While transformed, he wields two Delta Blasters and possesses a Battlizer.

Jack Landors is portrayed by Brandon Jay McLaren.

==== Sky Tate ====
Schuyler "Sky" Tate is the S.P.D. Blue Ranger, second-in-command to Jack Landors, a founding member of B-Squad, and son of a previous Red Ranger who possesses the ability to create force fields. Initially a firm believer in following the rules, he desires to become a Red Ranger like his father, who was killed-in-action years before. However, his pride and lack of faith in his teammates lead to him becoming the Blue Ranger. Throughout the series, he clashes with Jack, who was named the Red Ranger over him, avenges his father by apprehending the criminal who killed him, and learns to become a proper leader. In time, Jack retires from S.P.D., leading to Sky taking his place as B-Squad's Red Ranger.

Sky Tate is portrayed by Chris Violette.

==== Bridge Carson ====
Bridge Carson is the S.P.D. Green Ranger, a computer genius, expert mechanic, and founding member of B-Squad. While he comes off as gullible, slow, and lacking in confidence, he possesses a heart of gold and an intuitive mind. As the series progresses, he gradually becomes more confident and goes on to be promoted to Blue Ranger.

While untransformed, he possesses a form of psychometry and the ability to read auras and energy signatures, which later allows him to read thoughts. Due to him lacking control over this ability, he wears gloves.

Bridge Carson is portrayed by Matt Austin.

==== Z Delgado ====
Elizabeth "Z" Delgado is the S.P.D. Yellow Ranger and a former street thief who possesses the ability to duplicate herself. Due to this, she was ostracized as a child. In time, she met and befriended Jack Landors and Piggy before joining S.P.D. Easy-going yet slovenly, she can prove vicious in combat. As the series progresses, she gradually forms a friendship with her teammate Syd Drew despite their differing personalities and reaches out to Sam, which eventually leads to him joining S.P.D. as well.

Z Delgado is portrayed by Monica May.

==== Syd Drew ====
Sydney "Syd" Drew is the S.P.D. Pink Ranger and a founding member of B-Squad who possesses the ability to absorb other materials' properties through her hands. Born into a wealthy family, she comes off as vain and selfish, but possesses a caring and compassionate side.

Syd Drew is portrayed by Alycia Purrott.

=== Doggie Cruger ===
Commander Anubis "Doggie" Cruger is a canine alien from the planet Sirius and one of S.P.D.'s earliest members, having trained at the organization's academy and scarred the Troobian Empire's Emperor Gruumm in his younger years before he was defeated by General Benagg, who exterminated the Sirian race and seemingly killed Cruger's wife Isinia. Following this, Cruger went on to found S.P.D.'s Earth branch, train recruits to become Power Rangers, and become the Shadow Ranger.

Doggie Cruger is voiced by John Tui in Power Rangers S.P.D. and Kyle Hebert in Power Rangers: Battle for the Grid.

== Recurring characters ==
=== S.P.D. ===
Space Patrol Delta (S.P.D.) is an interplanetary police force that oversees intergalactic law throughout the galaxy via teams of Power Rangers.

==== Kat Manx ====
Dr. Katherine "Kat" Manx is a feline alien, close friend of Doggie Cruger, and S.P.D.'s chief technologist. As one of S.P.D.'s earliest members, she developed much of their technology and worked with B-Squad's parents. In the episode "Katastrophe", she receives a disposable Morpher, which she uses to temporarily become the Kat Ranger and thwart her former classmate Professor Mooney's plans.

Due in part to her alien physiology, she is exceptionally agile and a skilled fighter. As the Kat Ranger, she can create miniature auroras and feather-like "Cat Stunners".

Kat Manx is portrayed by Michelle Langstone.

==== Boom ====
Boom is Kat Manx's human lab assistant who previously attended S.P.D. Academy, but washed out.

Boom is portrayed by Kelson Henderson.

==== Fowler Birdie ====
Fowler Birdie is an avian alien, supreme commander of S.P.D., and Commander Cruger's superior. Arrogant and blunt, Birdie clashes with Cruger over their command styles.

Fowler Birdie is voiced by Paul Norell.

==== Sam ====
Sam is a misunderstood street orphan who possesses the ability to teleport objects. After his mother died in an accident years prior, he became a target of bullying. His desire to make friends leads to him being manipulated by Mora and Bugglesworth into helping them collect people. After eventually realizing the truth, Sam helps the B-Squad Rangers defeat and apprehend Bugglesworth before joining the S.P.D. Academy.

As of the year 2040, Sam went on to become the white-colored Omega Ranger and was tasked with traveling back in time to 2025 to save B-Squad from Devastation and avert a post-apocalyptic future that had resulted from it. Despite being turned into a floating ball of energy outside of his Ranger form as a side effect, Sam remains in 2025 to help B-Squad defeat the Troobian Empire before returning to his time.

In his Ranger form, Sam possesses the Uniforce Cycle and the Omega Morpher which, in addition to allowing him to transform, grants additional abilities such as temporal manipulation, enhanced strength, and the ability to fire bursts of electricity from his palm.

Sam is portrayed by Aaron James Murphy as a child and Brett Stewart as an adult in Power Rangers S.P.D. and voiced by Yuri Lowenthal in Power Rangers: Super Legends.

=== Piggy ===
Piggy is a homeless alien informant and friend of Z Delgado with connections in New Tech City's criminal underworld who typically works for whoever pays or intimidates him the most. Later in the series, he wins the lottery and opens a trailer café for alien criminals, though S.P.D.'s presence frequently leads to him losing customers. After selling out the S.P.D. Rangers to the Troobian Empire, a guilt-ridden Piggy helps the former defeat the latter before volunteering at a clothing store.

Piggy is portrayed by Barnie Duncan.

=== Troobian Empire ===
The Troobian Empire is a warlike galactic empire bent on conquering and destroying planets for Omni and Emperor Gruumm.

==== Emperor Gruumm ====
Emperor Gruumm is Omni's relentless figurehead and rival of Commander Cruger who desires to conquer other worlds. Years prior, he destroyed Cruger's homeworld of Sirius, but was injured by him in turn. While attacking Earth to construct a body for Omni and seek revenge on Cruger, Gruumm is eventually defeated and arrested by Cruger.

Emperor Gruumm is portrayed by Rene Naufahu.

==== Mora / Morgana ====
Morgana is a spoiled and immature criminal being of indeterminate origin, Emperor Gruumm's servant, and a gifted pictomancer who can bring her drawings to life. Despising her adult form despite its power, she asked Gruumm to turn her into a 10-year-old girl and renamed herself Mora. Throughout the series, she creates monsters to serve Gruumm. Despite being temporarily turned back into Morgana as punishment for a string of failures, she eventually regains his favor and her young form, only to be brainwashed by Omni and arrested by Commander Cruger.

Mora is portrayed by Olivia James-Baird while Morgana is portrayed by Josephine Davison.

==== Omni ====
Omni is a giant brain-like alien with psychic powers and the power behind the throne of the Troobian Empire. Throughout the series, he tasks Emperor Gruumm and his forces with gathering resources to construct a colossal biomechanical body called the "Magnificence" for himself so he can destroy Earth. Nonetheless, he is defeated by S.P.D.

Omni is voiced by Geoff Dolan.

=== Broodwing ===
Broodwing is an emotionless and greedy vampire bat-themed alien arms dealer who largely works for himself while occasionally allying himself with the Troobian Empire and other criminals. Following the arrival of the Omega Ranger and the Troobian Empire's Emperor Gruumm refusing to pay him, Broodwing mounts several failed attempts to conquer Earth for himself and destroy S.P.D. before Gruumm can until he is eventually thwarted and arrested by S.P.D.

Broodwing is voiced by Jim McLarty.

== Guest characters ==
- A-Squad: The S.P.D. Earth branch's elite yet secretly corrupt Ranger team. Early in the series, they are sent to the Helix Nebula to defend it from the Troobian Empire, but are seemingly overwhelmed and are considered missing-in-action. During this time, they defected to the Troobian Empire and destroyed one of S.P.D.'s bases before returning to capture Commander Cruger. Despite succeeding, they are eventually defeated and arrested by B-Squad.
  - Charlie: A-Squad's Red Ranger and the Hispanic leader of the group. Charlie is portrayed by Gina Varela.
  - "A-Squad Blue": The unnamed Blue Ranger and a walrus-like alien. "A-Squad Blue" is voiced by Nick Kemplen.
  - "A-Squad Green": The unnamed Green Ranger and a male African American member of the group. "A-Squad Green" is portrayed by Thomas Kiwi and voiced by Nick Kemplen.
  - "A-Squad Yellow": The unnamed Yellow Ranger and a male Caucasian member of the group. "A-Squad Yellow" is portrayed by Allan Smith and voiced by Gregory Cooper.
  - "A-Squad Pink": The unnamed Pink Ranger and a female Asian member of the group. "A-Squad Pink" is portrayed by Motoko Nagino and voiced by Claire Dougan.
- Krybots: The Troobian Empire's foot soldiers which come in the following three varieties; each one stronger than the previous: gray heads that wield blasters and swords; "Blueheads" that primarily wield blasters; and "Orangeheads" that primarily wield swords. The "Blueheads" are voiced by Derek Judge while the "Orangeheads" are voiced by James Gaylyn.
- Praxis: A diamond-themed monster that Mora created to destroy New Tech City via a drill machine, only for him to be arrested by S.P.D. Praxis is voiced by Bruce Hopkins.
- Ringbah: A bison-themed alien bounty hunter hired by Emperor Gruumm to distract S.P.D.'s B-Squad from a diamond heist he was committing. Though Ringbah is defeated and arrested by B-Squad, Gruumm's plan succeeds. Ringbah is voiced by Bruce Hopkins.
- Rhinix: A rhinoceros-themed alien mercenary who purchased a formula from Piggy that can turn humans into slime-based fuel. Emperor Gruumm sends Rhinix to use the formula to kidnap people and turn them into fuel until the latter is defeated and arrested by S.P.D.'s B-Squad while his victims are restored. Rhinix is voiced by Mark Wright.
- T-Top: A mantis-themed alien bounty hunter who comes to Earth in pursuit of Hydrax. Broodwing enlarges him to cause chaos until S.P.D.'s B-Squad return him to normal. After Hydrax is defeated, T-Top is not allowed back on Earth for causing property damage. T-Top is voiced by Mark Wright.
- Hydrax: A leaf-themed alien bank robber from the planet Fernovia who can fire high-pressure water streams from her fingers and disguise herself as a human. She travels to New Tech City to rob banks, framing T-Top in the process, until she is exposed by Bridge Carson and arrested by S.P.D.'s B-Squad. Hydrax is portrayed by Sarah Thomson.
- Bugglesworth: An octopus-themed monster that Mora created to help her expand her doll collection by turning people into dolls. However, he is defeated by Sam and B-Squad and arrested by the latter, which restores Bugglesworth's victims to normal. Bugglesworth is voiced by Kelson Henderson.
- Dru Harrington / Giganis: An S.P.D. cadet, expert marksman, and Sky Tate's best friend from the planet Tangar who can shapeshift between a humanoid and monstrous firearms-themed form. After being sent to the Nebula Academy sometime prior to the series, Dru seemingly goes missing while secretly working for Broodwing. In the present, Dru is tasked with assassinating Commander Cruger, but is thwarted by Sky. Dru uses an enlargement device on himself, but is defeated and arrested by S.P.D.'s B-Squad. Dru Harrington is portrayed by Dwayne Cameron.
- Sinuku: A beetle-themed alien scientist who originally used his brilliant mind to develop weapons before he was imprisoned in a satellite prison over the planet KO-35. After Broodwing breaks him out, Sinuku travels to Earth to find his former partner Dr. Rheas and force her to help him recover his weaponry until he is defeated and arrested by S.P.D.'s B-Squad. Sinuku is voiced by James Coleman.
- Dr. Rheas: A human scientist and former colleague of Sinuku. Dr. Rheas is portrayed by Marjan Shahrinia.
- General Benaag: An alien cyborg and Emperor Gruumm's second-in-command. Years prior, he led an attack on the planet Sirius, during which he kidnapped Commander Cruger's wife Isinia. In the present, he resurfaces to renew his rivalry with Cruger, who eventually defeats and arrests him. General Benaag is voiced by James Gaylyn.
- Drakel: A Vampiranoid (a race of werewolf/vampire bat-themed aleins) who seeks out a stone called "The Evil" to negate his photosensitivity. Despite succeeding, he is defeated and arrested by S.P.D.'s B-Squad. Drakel is voiced by Mike Havoc.
- Baskin: An alien wizard and the guardian of "The Evil". Baskin is portrayed by Paul Willis.
- S.O.P.H.I.E.: An android computer programmer and cadet in S.P.D.'s D-Squad whose name stands for "Series One Processor Hyper Intelligent Encryptor". Due to prejudice against androids, she initially hides her true nature. However, S.P.D.'s B-Squad discover her secret and expel her without Commander Cruger's permission, leading to her being kidnapped by General Valko. Upon realizing their mistake, B-Squad rescues her with Cruger's help. After helping them defeat Valko, she is transferred to S.P.D.'s theta quadrant branch to become a programmer. S.O.P.H.I.E. is portrayed by Natacha Hutchison.
- General Valko: An astronaut/flame-themed alien terrorist, member of the Perterian Army, and associate of Mora. After Mora promises him General Benaag's former position as Emperor Gruumm's second-in-command, Valko travels to New Tech City to find S.O.P.H.I.E. and use her to power a giant, robotic monster called Goradon. However, S.P.D. rescues S.O.P.H.I.E., who helps them destroy Goradon and defeat and arrest Valko. General Valko is voiced by Jason Hoyte.
- Tomars: A chameleon-themed alien criminal and computer expert who possesses a laptop-like device and a bracer, both of which are capable of using Earth's satellites to teleport himself and others across 16 dimensions. He kidnaps Jack Landors and Sky Tate, but they are rescued by Boom. Tomars subsequently attempts to attack S.P.D. headquarters through their computer systems, but is deleted by Boom. Tomars is voiced by Campbell Cooley.
- Wootox: An infamous alien criminal who wears a translation collar, is reputed to have destroyed over 90 planets, uses coin flips to make decisions, and is capable of body-swapping himself with other people. After being arrested by Sky Tate, he switches bodies with him and destroys his collar in an attempt to take S.P.D. headquarters for himself. However, Wootox is eventually exposed and forced back into his original body before being re-arrested. Wootox is voiced by Jeremy Birchall.
- Katana: An alien warrior who crash-landed in Japan centuries prior and was nursed back to health by a samurai who taught him his ways. Emperor Gruumm brings him to the present to distract S.P.D. from a heist Morgana committed. Unaware of the latter, S.P.D. travels to Japan to fight Katana before Jack Landors defeats him and sends him back to his time. Katana is voiced by Mark Wright.
- Changtor: A martial artist-themed alien criminal who Broodwing hired to fight S.P.D.'s B-Squad. After enlarging himself, Changtor is defeated and arrested by them. Changtor is voiced by Darren Young.
- Green Eyes: A reptile-themed alien criminal who Emperor Gruumm sent to rob the world gold depository, only for him to be defeated by Sam and arrested by S.P.D.'s B-Squad. Green Eyes is voiced by Matthew Sunderland.
- Shorty: A goblin-themed alien, the galaxy's second-most wanted criminal, friend of Morgana, and younger brother of Devastation who possesses metallic fists and rubbery skin capable of deflecting most blows. He is defeated and arrested by the Omega Ranger. Shorty is voiced by Ray Trickett.
- Devastation: A lightning-themed alien who is the galaxy's most wanted criminal, a friend of Morgana, and older brother of Shorty. In an alternate timeline, he successfully killed S.P.D.'s B-Squad, leading to the Troobian Empire conquering Earth. Seeking to avert this, the Omega Ranger travels back in time to save B-Squad and help them defeat and arrest Devastation. Devastation is voiced by Kelson Henderson.
- Mysticon: A struggling alien street magician. After receiving a magic wand from Morgana, he assists her in kidnapping scientists until he is defeated and arrested by S.P.D. Mysticon is voiced by Barnie Duncan.
- Al: Mysticon's lizard-like alien assistant. Al is voiced by Barnie Duncan.
- Slate: A Noppera-bō-like alien and copycat criminal with the ability to shapeshift into anyone and copy their powers via their DNA samples. After Broodwing hires him to attack S.P.D.'s B-Squad, Slate temporarily overpowers them until they fight back. Despite receiving the ability to multiply himself from Morgana, Slate is defeated and arrested by Jack Landors. Slate is voiced by Jeremy Birchall.
- Mirloc: A centipede/mirror-themed alien criminal who can travel through reflective surfaces and trap people in his chest mirror. Years prior, he murdered Sky Tate's father before Mirloc was arrested and denied access to reflective surfaces. After Tate seeks out his help in defeating Slate in the present, Mirloc manipulates the former into crying so he can use his tears to escape. While wreaking havoc on Earth however, Sam shatters his chest mirror before Sky defeats and re-arrests Mirloc. Mirloc is voiced by Mike Drew.
- Stench: An eel-themed alien criminal and partner of Thresher. While Thresher distracts S.P.D., Stench infiltrates their headquarters to steal schematics on their S.W.A.T. technology, break out Thresher, and give themselves powered suits. The pair subsequently terrorize New Tech City until they are defeated and arrested by S.P.D.'s B-Squad. Stench is voiced by Greg Johnson.
- Thresher: A shark-themed alien criminal and partner of Stench. He distracts S.P.D. so Stench can infiltrate their headquarters and steal schematics on their S.W.A.T. technology. Despite being captured, Stench frees Thresher and gives him a powered suit. The pair subsequently terrorize New Tech City until they are defeated and arrested by S.P.D.'s B-Squad. Thresher is voiced by Paul Barrett.
- Sergeant Silverback: An eccentric gorilla-themed alien, old friend of Commander Cruger, and a S.P.D. training instructor based on the planet Zentor. Sergeant Silverback is voiced by John Tui.
- Gineka, Delapoo, and Chiaggo: Rich, narcissistic criminals backed by Broodwing who all possess giant robots. Gineka is an aristocrat-themed alien, Delapoo is a hunting dog-themed alien, and Chiaggo is a platinum-themed alien. While attacking the Alpha 5 star system, Bridge Carson has prophetic dreams about them. After warning his team and superiors, they eventually defeat and arrest the trio. Gineka, Delapoo, and Chiaggo are voiced by Shane Bosher, Glen Drake, and Stephen Brunton, respectively.
- One Eye: A giant cyclops/typhoon monster created by Morgana to fight S.P.D.'s B-Squad, only to be arrested by them. One Eye is voiced by Jarrod Holt.
- Silverhead: A jackal/sniper-themed monster created by Morgana to fight S.P.D.'s B-Squad, only to be arrested by them. Silverhead is voiced by Michael Hurst.
- Professor Mooney: A crescent moon-headed alien scientist and Kat Manx's former classmate. Seeking revenge on her, he joins forces with Broodwing to attack New Tech City with a small army of giant robots until he is thwarted by Manx and arrested by S.P.D.'s B-Squad. Professor Mooney is voiced by Cameron Rhodes.
- Herock: A white tiger-like crime lord. He is pursued by Bridge Carson until the former is killed by Bork. Herock is voiced by Geoff Dolan.
- Bork: A scorpion-themed alien criminal and self-proclaimed "ultimate master" who is wanted in ten galaxies and reputed to have destroyed Alpha Centauri. After kidnapping Bridge Carson, he fights S.P.D.'s B-Squad, who rescue Bridge and eventually arrest Bork. Bork is voiced by Blair Strang.
- Dragouls: A species of dragon-like alien monsters. Broodwing attempts to use two individuals to destroy New Tech City, only for them to be destroyed by the S.P.D. Rangers. The Dragouls are voiced by Patrick Wilson.
- Connor McKnight: An aspiring soccer player from Reefside who previously operated as the Red Dino Thunder Ranger before losing his powers while defeating Mesogog in 2004 and goes on to open soccer camps. While attending his high school reunion in 2005, he and his fellow Dino Thunder Rangers are transported to 2025 by Broodwing and Kraw, who temporarily restored their powers in an attempt to use them for the Troobian Empire's plans. However, the trio escape and join forces with the S.P.D. Rangers to defeat them before being returned to their time. The S.P.D. Rangers later encounter a past version of Connor after traveling back in time to 2004 to thwart another of the Troobian Empire's plans. Connor McKnight is portrayed by James Napier.
- Ethan James: A technology expert from Reefside who previously operated as the Blue Dino Thunder Ranger before losing his powers while defeating Mesogog in 2004 and goes on to develop advanced technology used by S.P.D. While attending his high school reunion in 2005, he and his fellow Dino Thunder Rangers are transported to 2025 by Broodwing and Kraw, who temporarily restored their powers in an attempt to use them for the Troobian Empire's plans. However, the trio escape and join forces with the S.P.D. Rangers to defeat them before being returned to their time. The S.P.D. Rangers later encounter a past version of Ethan after traveling back in time to 2004 to thwart another of the Troobian Empire's plans. Ethan James is portrayed by Kevin Duhaney.
- Kira Ford: An aspiring musician from Reefside who previously operated as the Yellow Dino Thunder Ranger before losing her powers while defeating Mesogog in 2004 who goes on to become a popular singer. While attending her high school reunion in 2005, she and her fellow Dino Thunder Rangers are transported to 2025 by Broodwing and Kraw, who temporarily restored their powers in an attempt to use them for the Troobian Empire's plans. However, the trio escape and join forces with the S.P.D. Rangers to defeat them before being returned to their time. The S.P.D. Rangers later encounter a past version of Kira after traveling back in time to 2004 to thwart another of the Troobian Empire's plans. Kira Ford is portrayed by Emma Lahana.
- Kraw: A squid-themed alien criminal who took the form of an astronomer named Professor Cerebros. Following a failed attempt to help Broodwing use the Dino Thunder Rangers for the Troobian Empire's purposes, Kraw attempts to redirect a meteor to collide with Earth. However, he is thwarted and arrested by S.P.D.'s B-Squad. Kraw is voiced by Stig Eldred.
- Icthior: An underhanded archerfish/samurai-themed alien and rival of Cruger's from the S.P.D academy. After being spurned by Isinia and expelled from the academy for his tactics, Icthior vowed revenge. In the present, Broodwing hires him to attack the S.P.D. Rangers until Cruger eventually defeats and arrests Icthior. Icthior is voiced by Jason Hoyte in Power Rangers S.P.D. and by Wally Wingert in Power Rangers: Super Legends.
- Delex: An inductor-themed alien criminal who can turn people into batteries. He assists Broodwing in his plot to take over Earth until he is arrested by S.P.D.'s B-Squad. Delex is voiced by Andrew Laing.
- Trent Fernandez: The son of Anton Mercer who operated as the White Dino Thunder Ranger before losing his powers while fighting Mesogog. The S.P.D. Rangers encounter a past version of Trent and his team after traveling back in time to 2004 to thwart the Troobian Empire's plans. Trent Fernandez is portrayed by Jeffrey Parazzo.
- Tommy Oliver: A veteran Ranger who previously operated as the Green and White Mighty Morphin Ranger, the Red Zeo and Turbo Ranger, and the Black Dino Thunder Ranger. The S.P.D. Rangers encounter a past version of Tommy and the Dino Thunder Rangers after traveling back in time to 2004 to thwart the Troobian Empire's plans. Tommy Oliver is voiced by an uncredited Jeffrey Parazzo.
- Zeltrax: An enemy of the Dino Thunder Rangers who initially worked for Mesogog before breaking off to fight them on his own. He forms an alliance with the Troobian Empire, but is defeated by the Dino Thunder and S.P.D. Rangers. Zeltrax is voiced by James Gaylyn.
- Ally Samuels: The daughter of Samuel Clothing's unnamed owner. Ally Samuels is portrayed by Beth Allen.
- Isinia Cruger: A Sirian and Commander Cruger's wife. Years prior to the series, she was captured by the Troobian Empire and presumed dead amidst Sirius' destruction. After being captured in the present, Cruger discovers Isinia is alive and rescues her while thwarting the empire's plans. Isinia Cruger is voiced by Tandi Wright.
- Crabhead: A fiddler crab-themed alien criminal who accompanied Broodwing in his assault on S.P.D.'s headquarters until he is defeated and arrested by S.P.D.'s B-Squad. Crabhead is voiced by Robert Mignault.
- Spiketor: A sea urchin-themed alien criminal who accompanied Broodwing in his assault on S.P.D.'s headquarters until he is defeated and arrested by S.P.D.'s B-Squad. Spiketor is voiced by Edwin Wright.
- Lazor: A shrimp-themed alien criminal who accompanied Broodwing in his assault on S.P.D.'s headquarters until she is defeated and arrested by S.P.D.'s B-Squad. Lazor is voiced by Michaela Rooney.
- Nova: An S.P.D. officer and Sam's partner from the year 2040 who operates as the silver-colored Nova Ranger and possesses a similar Morpher as him. Amidst S.P.D.'s final battle with the Troobian Empire, she travels to 2025 to help the former before joining Sam in returning to their time. Nova is voiced by Antonia Prebble and portrayed by an uncredited actor.
