= List of Dhruva enemies =

This is the list of fictional characters who have appeared in Raj Comics as the enemies of Raj comics superhero Super Commando Dhruva. Dhruva has one of the most recognisable rogues gallery in Indian comic book genre. Over the years, Dhruva has fought many villains ranging from normal human beings to costumed villains, from supervillains to aliens, comedic villains and tricksters to demons and god-like beings and sometimes even other superheroes who have gone rogue. Some of Dhruva enemies have subsequently turned towards the good side. On some occasions, Dhruva has also fought against supervillains who are arch foes of other Raj Comics superheroes.

== Classic rogues gallery ==
List of Dhruva's prominent foes including super-villains and themed criminals in alphabetical order (with issue and date of first appearance).

| Villain | First appearance | Description |
|---|---|---|
| Grand Master Robo | GENL #116 Maut Ka Olympic (1989) | Grand Master Robo is a crime-lord, leader of a worldwide terrorist organization Robo Army, Dhruva's arch-enemy, father of Dhruva's love interest Natasha and the most famous and recurring villain. Left half of his body is metallic and he has a laser-eye fit into his left eye. |
| Bauna Waman | SPCL #7 Khooni Khilone (1991) | Bauna Waman is an expert in creating toys of various kinds and in using them for destruction. |
| Chandkaal | SPCL #10 Kirigi Ka Kahar (1992) | Chandakaal is the last remaining Rakshas or Demon on Earth. His motive is to bring back the race of demons to the Earth. |
| Maha Manav | GENL #179 Mahamanav (1990) | Maha Manav is an incredibly powerful, psychic super human who evolved at a rate faster than the normal homo sapiens giving him a host of psychic and mental powers. |
| Dr. Virus | GENL #255 Vinaash Ke Vriksha (1991) | A genius biologist with an evil intention, to kill Dhruva. |
| Dhwaniraj | SPCL #6 Aawaj Ki Tabaahi (1991) | Dhwaniraj is a scientist who specialises in weaponising sound waves. |
| Chumba | SPCL #13 Chumba Ka Chakravyuh (1992) | Chumba possesses the power of magnetism and is the most skilled scientist in magnetic power. |

== Foes of lesser renown ==
In alphabetical order (with issue and date of first appearance)

| Villain | First appearance | Description |
|---|---|---|
| Boss | GENL #74 Pratishodh Ki Jwala (1987) | The owner of Globe Circus, the rival circus of Jupiter Circus, Boss hatched the master plan with Jubisko to destroy Jupiter circus. He was presumed dead when he tried to flee from Dhruva but got accidentally electrocuted. Many years later he reappeared in SPCL #121 Jung (1998), as a paralysed wheelchair ridden boss of Rohini Circus who tries to take revenge from Dhruva but fails and eventually gets arrested. |
| Jubisko | GENL #74 Pratishodh Ki Jwala (1987) | Strongman of Globe circus, he burnt Jupiter circus after killing Dhruva's father. Later, attacked by a lion while he was trying to kill Dhruva, he was presumed to be dead. He was later revealed to have survived the lion attack when he returned in GENL #222 Bahari Maut (1991). He was eventually killed at the hands of his own pet lions, tiger and gorilla that he had specially trained to kill Dhruva. |
| Narsingha | GENL #92 Aadamkhoron Ka Swarg (1988) | S. P. Sherkhan of Lakshadweep island got hold of a mysterious genetic formula, which on drinking can convert a man into a mutant man-animal on activation by a special wrist band. He enlisted the prisoners whom he helped escape from his prison into raising a mutant army, and led the army as Narsingha (The Lion-Man). |
| Roman Assassin | GENL #79 Roman Hatyara (1988) | Mr. Disouza, one of the 4 deputy directors of Kundanpur Museum, steals an antique Roman helmet that mysteriously gives its bearer superhuman strength. He then goes on a killing spree in a bid to take revenge for taking away his chance of becoming the Director of the museum, killing two of his three fellow deputy directors before being brought to a halt by Dhruva. |

== Teams and organizations ==
| Villain | First appearance | Description |
|---|---|---|
| The Mutants | GENL #92 Aadamkhoron Ka Swarg (1988) | An army of mutant man-animals led by Narsingha(The Lion-man). |
| The Olympic Committee | GENL #116 Maut Ka Olympic (1989) | A brain-child of Grand Master Robo, The Olympic Committee staged a crime olympic in Rajnagar where criminals from all over the world competed for the first prize - Right to execute Super Commando Dhruva. |

== Minions and henchmen ==
The following is the list of henchmen and minions, who worked for Dhruva's enemies, in alphabetical order (with issue and date of first appearance)

| Villain | First appearance | Description |
|---|---|---|
| Bond | GENL #74 Pratishodh Ki Jwala (1988) | A sharp shooter who worked for Boss, died due to fall from height during a skirmish with Dhruva. |
