= List of Avengers enemies =

The Avengers are a superhero team, published by Marvel Comics. Comprising many of Marvel's premier heroes, they "fight the foes no single superhero can withstand".

== Human groups ==
- Enclave
- H.A.M.M.E.R.
- Hydra
- Maggia
- Triune Understanding

== Alien races ==
- Badoon
- Beyonders
- Dire Wraiths
- Kree
- Skrull

== Teams ==
- Black Order
- Brotherhood of Mutants
- Circus of Crime
- Dark Avengers
- Gatherers
- Legion of the Unliving
- Lethal Legion
- Masters of Evil
- Savage Land Mutates
- Serpent Society
- Sinister Six
- Sons of the Serpent
- Squadron Sinister
- U-Foes
- Wrecking Crew
- Zodiac

== Individual enemies ==
- Abomination
- Absorbing Man
- Annihilus
- Ares
- Arkon
- Arnim Zola
- Attuma
- Awesome Android
- Baron Blood
- Baron Mordo
- Baron Strucker
- Baron Zemo
- Batroc the Leaper
- Beyonder
- Black Knight (Nathan Garrett)
- Black Mamba
- Blastaar
- Blood Brothers
- Chemistro
- Collector
- Constrictor
- Cottonmouth
- Count Nefaria
- Crimson Dynamo
- Deathurge
- Diablo
- Doctor Doom
- Doctor Octopus
- Dormammu
- Dragon Man
- Dracula
- Egghead
- Electro
- Enchantress
- Executioner
- Exodus
- Fixer
- Flag-Smasher
- Galactus
- Ghaur
- Goliath
- Grandmaster
- Graviton
- Grey Gargoyle
- Griffin
- Grim Reaper
- Growing Man
- High Evolutionary
- The Hood
- Imus Champion
- Immortus
- Iron Maniac
- Iron Monger
- Justin Hammer
- Kang the Conqueror
- King Cobra
- Klaw
- Korvac
- Leader
- Living Laser
- Loki
- Madame Masque
- Mad Thinker
- Maelstrom
- Magneto
- Mandarin
- Master of the World
- Maximus
- Melter
- Mephisto
- Midgard Serpent
- Mister Hyde
- Mole Man
- Molecule Man
- Moonstone
- Morgan le Fay
- Moses Magnum
- Namor
- Nebula
- Norman Osborn
- Psyklop
- Puff Adder
- Puppet Master
- Radioactive Man
- Rattler
- Red Ghost
- Red Guardian
- Red Skull
- Rhino
- Ronan the Accuser
- Scarlet Centurion
- Sidewinder
- Screaming Mimi
- Space Phantom
- Star Stalker
- Super-Adaptoid
- Super-Skrull
- Surtur
- Taskmaster
- Terminatrix
- Thanos
- Tyrak
- Ultimo
- Ultron
- Whiplash
- Wizard
- Whirlwind
- Wonder Man
- Ymir
- Zzzax
