= List of Power Rangers Beast Morphers characters =

Power Rangers Beast Morphers is an American children's television series that aired on Nickelodeon. It is the 2019 entry in the Power Rangers franchise and serves as a direct continuation of Power Rangers RPM. The show follows Devon Daniels, Ravi Shaw, Zoey Reeves, Nate Silva, and Steel as they are recruited by Grid Battleforce to defend the Morphin Grid from Evox.

== Main characters ==
=== Beast Morpher Power Rangers ===
The Beast Morpher Rangers are a government-funded team formed by Grid Battleforce from Morph-X combined with animal DNA. Blaze and Roxy were the original candidates for the Red and Yellow Rangers until Evox corrupted the morphing process and infected their bodies; producing clones who became his loyal Avatars while the real ones were rendered comatose. Following this, Devon and Zoey took their place by accident. However, their Morph-X was partially corrupted by Evox, causing them to receive varying weaknesses. The Rangers transform using Beast-X Morphers in conjunction with Morph-X Keys and each wield a Beast-X Blaster and Saber, which can be combined to form the Beast-X Cannon. In season two, Nate developed the Beast-X Visors, which allow Devon, Ravi, and Zoey to combine with their Beast Bot partners and assume Beast-X Mode to enhance their animal powers.

==== Devon Daniels ====
Devon Daniels is the leader of the Beast Morpher Rangers and the son of Mayor Adam Daniels. Originally, he was not meant to be the Red Ranger as he was not associated with Grid Battleforce. After he snuck in and witnessed Evox’s first attack, he became the Red Ranger. After defeating Evox, Devon became the new commander of Grid Battleforce following Commander Shaw's promotion.

As the Red Beast Morpher Ranger, he was fused with cheetah DNA, which allows him to move at superhuman speeds. Due to Evox's corruption however, Devon will instantly become frozen whenever he sees or hear anything related to dogs. In season one, Devon temporarily acquired a new form called Red Fury Mode, which enhanced his strength. As it ran on Fury Cells that slowly corrupted him however, he was forced to discard it.

Devon Daniels is portrayed by Rorrie D. Travis.

==== Ravi Shaw ====
Ravi Shaw is a Grid Battleforce cadet, son of Commander Shaw, and the only original candidate who survived Evox's first attack. He was in a relationship with Roxy before he broke up with her to embrace his duties as a Ranger. He later felt guilty for pushing her aside after her Avatar's creation left her comatose and eventually revived her before mending their relationship.

As the Blue Beast Morpher Ranger, he was fused with gorilla DNA, which gives him superhuman strength. Due to Evox's corruption, Ravi will overheat and become enraged whenever he overuses his powers enough to attack friend and foe alike.

Ravi Shaw is portrayed by Jasmeet "Jazz" Baduwalia.

==== Zoey Reeves ====
Zoey Reeves is a former laundry girl at Grid Battleforce who became the Yellow Ranger after Roxy was rendered comatose. Zoey displays an optimistic approach to solving problems.

As the Yellow Beast Morpher Ranger, she was fused with jackrabbit DNA, which gives her powerful jumping and kicking abilities. Due to Evox's corruption, Zoey will become exhausted over time and must consume carrots to replenish her energy.

Zoey Reeves is portrayed by Jacqueline Scislowski.

==== Nate Silva ====
Nate Silva is a child prodigy, chief researcher, and head of technology at Grid Battleforce. He developed Morph-X for use as a clean, sustainable energy source and created the Rangers' powers and arsenal. Being a genius, Nate is a quick thinker in situations that require it; such as when he gave Devon, Ravi, and Zoey their powers to protect the Morphin Grid. He is also the unwitting creator of Evox when he experimented with Morph-X, snake DNA, and a Cell Shift morpher infected with the Venjix virus.

When he was kidnapped by the Avatars and forced to build a robot body for Evox, Nate was able to subvert the plot by fusing himself with mantis DNA, which allows him to use martial arts, and become the Gold Beast Morpher Ranger. Following this, he officially joined the other Rangers in the field.

Nate Silva is portrayed by Abraham Rodriguez.

==== Steel ====
Steel is a stag beetle/scarab beetle-like android whom Nate built after he was captured by the Avatars and forced to build a robot body for Evox. When Nate subverted their plot, he inadvertently fused said robot body with scarab beetle DNA and his human DNA. As a result, "Steel" became the Silver Ranger as well as a "brother" of sorts to Nate. During the Rangers' final battle with Evox, Steel sacrificed himself to stop him, but the Morphin Grid later revived him as a human, who became an actor following the virus' defeat.

As the Silver Beast Morpher Ranger, he was fused with scarab DNA, granting him superhuman stamina.

Steel is voiced by Jamie Linehan and portrayed by Sam Jellie as a human.

== Recurring characters ==
=== Adam Daniels ===
Adam Daniels is Devon's strict but responsible father and the mayor of Coral Harbor. He was initially against Grid Battleforce's use of Morph-X until he learned of the Beast Morpher Rangers. After discovering his son had become the Red Ranger and was captured by Evox's forces, Mayor Daniels braved the Cyber Dimension to save him, but was unknowingly possessed by Evox in the process. Once the Rangers discover what happened, they receive help from Doctor K and successfully separate Mayor Daniels from the virus.

Adam Daniels is portrayed by Kevin Copeland.

=== Muriel Reeves ===
Muriel Reeves is Zoey's mother and a reporter for News Channel 10. She later learns her daughter is the Yellow Beast Morpher Ranger after Commander Shaw permits the latter to reveal her identity.

Muriel Reeves is portrayed by Sia Trokenheim.

=== Grid Battleforce ===
Grid Battleforce is a secret organization that was created to use Morph-X and keep their enemies from gaining control of the Morphin Grid.

==== Commander Shaw ====
Commander Shaw is Grid Battleforce's commander and Ravi's mother.

Following Evox's defeat, Commander Shaw is promoted to general and names Devon her replacement.

Commander Shaw is portrayed by Teuila Blakely.

==== Beast Bots ====
The Beasts Bots are the robotic partners of the Beast Morpher Rangers. Each one was developed based on their Rangers' animal motifs. When combined with the Rangers' Zords, the Beast Bots provide a Beast Mode while their heads take on the form of control devices. In season two, Nate developed the Beast-X Visor, which can digitize the Beast Bots and transform them into armor for their Ranger partners' Beast-X Modes.

- Cruise (voiced by Kelson Henderson) - The cheetah-like partner of Devon who suffers from short-term memory loss. Unlike the other Beast Bots, Cruise can transform into Devon's personal motorcycle.
- Smash (voiced by Charlie McDermott) - The gorilla-like partner of Ravi, who has a tendency for giving hugs.
- Jax (voiced by Emmett Skilton) - The jackrabbit-like partner of Zoey who dislikes being called "cute", and "little".

==== Betty and Ben Burke ====
Betty Burke and Ben Burke are sibling cadets of Grid Battleforce, the former being the eldest and most sensible while the latter is the most eager and impulsive. Though they have good intentions, their clumsiness can occasionally get the better of them. They work as a receptionist and security guard respectively, but can also provide assistance to the Rangers in combat. One year after Evox's defeat, they captured Scrozzle with assistance from Colonel Mason Truman.

Betty and Ben are portrayed by Kristina Ho and Cosme Flores respectively.

==== Blaze ====
Blaze is a karate instructor at the Riptide Gym and the original Red Ranger candidate. He develops a rivalry with Devon after the latter defeats him. While becoming the Red Ranger, Evox corrupted the process; putting Blaze into a coma and creating an evil avatar based on him that continued his rivalry with Devon. When his avatar is destroyed, Blaze comes out of his coma and makes amends with Devon; becoming fast friends before returning to his karate instructor job. Following Evox's defeat, Blaze became a stunt double for Steel.

Blaze is portrayed by Colby Strong.

==== Roxy ====
Roxy is the original Yellow Ranger candidate and Ravi's girlfriend. Before the series took place, they were in a relationship until Ravi broke up with her to focus on their ranger duties. While becoming the Yellow Ranger, Evox corrupts the process; putting Roxy in a coma and creating an evil avatar based on her.

When her avatar is destroyed, Roxy comes out of her coma and helps the Rangers foil one of Evox's plans using her evil counterpart's knowledge. Roxy later rekindled her relationship with Ravi and joined her Aunt Regina at Collins Industries.

Roxy is portrayed by Liana Ramirez.

==== General Burke ====
General Burke is a member of Grid Battleforce and the father of Betty and Ben. While he acts sternly, he cares for his children and has childish moments. In season two, he secretly established the Beast-X King Zord to help protect the world and rehired Megan to help develop the Zord's programming.

General Burke is portrayed by Mark Wright.

==== Other members ====
- Megan: A Grid Battleforce Zord technician who attempted to steal Nate's job through dishonest means, such as blackmailing Zoey to get close to him before sabotaging one of his experiments to make him look incompetent. After her deception was revealed, she was immediately fired by Commander Shaw. Sometime later, Megan was rehired by General Burke to help with secret project to create the Beast-X King Zord to protect the global Morph-X towers; overseeing the designing and programming herself, hoping to make amends for her past actions. After Evox's minions corrupt it, Megan reconciles with Nate and the Rangers before helping them regain control of the Zord. Following this, she is officially welcomed back to Grid Battleforce. Megan is portrayed by Madeleine Adams.

=== Evox' group ===
==== Evox ====
Evox is a sentient computer virus from another dimension who originally went by the name Venjix. Following his defeat at the hands of his creator, Doctor K, and the RPM Rangers, Venjix secretly downloaded some of his data into the Red RPM Ranger's Cell Shift morpher and was brought to a new dimension, where he fell into Nate's possession. After Nate mixed Morph-X and snake DNA with the morpher, Venjix used its codes to escape, take the name Evox, and assume a king cobra-like form. When Grid Battleforce constructed Morph-X towers, he attempts to take over the Morphin Grid via their computer systems to prevent other Rangers from stopping him again. In doing so, Evox creates evil avatar clones of Blaze and Roxy, puts the real ones into comas, and corrupts the Beast Morpher Rangers' animal DNA. However, he and his Avatars are sent to the Cyber Dimension, where they form an alliance with Scrozzle to obtain enough Morph-X to send Evox back to Coral Harbor. After stealing a Morph-X Tower, Scrozzle constructs a robot body for Evox, who uses it to overpower the Rangers before they destroy the tower during his teleportation attempt. Unbeknownst to them however, Evox possesses Mayor Daniels after the latter braved the Cyber Dimension to save his son.

Ever since, Evox secretly works to collect Morph-X once more to continue his plans and undermine the Rangers as Mayor Daniels while maintaining control over his host. Despite his best efforts, the Rangers eventually discover his secret and separate them, forcing Evox to alter his plans. Following a failed attempt to build a Chimera Zord, Evox allows himself to be captured by Grid Battleforce so he can obtain the morpher he hid within and download his original codes from it, restoring himself to his full power without Morph-X and granting himself the ability to rebuild destroyed Robotrons. After revealing his history to the Rangers, Evox enacts his master plan by taking over the Morph-X tower system and fusing himself with a stolen tower to create a new giant robot form for himself. However, the Rangers corrupt his base code with Morph-X infused human DNA, destroying him permanently.

In season two, Scrozzle used the Dino Charge Rangers' Energems and a geode to create the dinosaur-themed Chimera Zord for Evox. However, it is destroyed by the original, Dino Thunder, and Dino Charge Rangers' Megazords.

Evox/Venjix is voiced by Andrew Laing under the pseudonym of Randall Ewing.

==== Cybervillain Blaze ====
Cybervillain Blaze is the evil Crimson Ranger and a hard-light holographic Avatar of the human Blaze. While Blaze was becoming the Red Beast Morpher Ranger, Evox corrupts the process, placing the former in a coma and creating an evil Avatar based on Blaze to serve him. As a result, Cybervillain Blaze inherits his human template's rivalry with Devon after he was humiliated at the Riptide Gym. After a series of schemes and plots, he and Cybervillain Roxy succeed in stealing a Morph-X Tower so Scrozzle can use it to build Evox a robot body and send him back to Coral Harbor. When the Rangers storm the Cyber Dimension to destroy the tower, Blaze pilots a Megazord Scrozzle built to stop them, only to be defeated by Devon in the Racer Zord. As a result of the avatar's defeat, the real Blaze awakens from his coma.

Cybervillain Blaze is portrayed by Colby Strong.

==== Cybervillain Roxy ====
Cybervillain Roxy is the evil Yellow Ranger and a hard-light holographic Avatar of the human Roxy. While Roxy was becoming the Yellow Beast Morpher Ranger, Evox corrupts the process; placing her in a coma and creating an evil Avatar based on her to serve her. As Roxy's human counterpart was originally in a relationship with Ravi before he broke up with her, the Avatar uses this to her advantage to weaken Ravi's resolve. When Evox concocts a plan to teleport a Morph-X Tower to the Cyber Dimension, Cybervillain Roxy engages the Blue Ranger so Cybervillain Blaze can steal three mega transporters required for the plan. After destroying her morpher, Ravi succeeds in destroying Cybervillain Roxy; allowing the real Roxy to awaken from her coma.

Cybervillain Roxy is portrayed by Liana Ramirez.

==== Scrozzle ====
Scrozzle is a robot and the de facto ruler of the Cyber Dimension after he fled there to hide from Vargoyle. When Evox and the Cybervillains arrive in the Cyber Dimension, Scrozzle reluctantly forms an alliance with them, lending them his gadgetry skills, Tronics, Robotrons, and Gigadrones. While he dislikes having to work with the Cybervillains, viewing them as incompetent, he works with them once to betray Vargoyle. After the Cybervillains successfully steal a Morph-X Tower, Scrozzle begins construction on a robot body for Evox before preparing to teleport him back to the real world. However, the Rangers storm the Cyber Dimension and foil the latter plot, though Scrozzle escapes with his Robotron-Maker. Scrozzle attempts to get revenge against the Rangers, but is foiled by Steel and the Beast Bots.

In between seasons, Scrozzle commandeered the Crystal Dimension as a new base for Evox. To expand their ranks, Scrozzle arranges for the human Blaze and Roxy's capture so he can collect DNA samples from them and combine it with back-up data on the fallen Cybervillains and spare robot parts to create robot versions of them. To ensure they survive, he also programs the Robot Maker to recreate their bodies should they fall in battle. After Robo-Roxy inadvertently overloads the Robot Maker while upgrading herself however, it is destroyed beyond repair. Following the Rangers' final battle with Evox, Scrozzle goes into hiding in the latter's home dimension. One year later, he is found by Colonel Mason Truman, Betty, and Ben, and remanded to Grid Battleforce's holding cells.

Scrozzle is voiced by Campbell Cooley.

==== Vargoyle ====
Vargoyle is a laser gun-themed robot built by Scrozzle. After using several Fury Cells on himself, he became more evil than his creator and turned on him, forcing Scrozzle to take refuge in the Cyber Dimension. After eventually finding him to take the remaining Fury Cells and defeating the Cybervillains, Evox recruits Vargoyle into his ranks and offers a reward if he proves himself against the Rangers. Once he does so, Vargoyle receives an upgrade originally meant for the Cybervillains, who put aside their differences to get revenge. Vargoyle continues to prove himself to Evox by easily defeating the Rangers in a second fight and building a weapon from a blueprint he stole from the Cybervillains for his master plan. After creating Shockatron and Shockadrone to distract the Rangers, Vargoyle uses his Memory Pulsator to alter Coral Harbor's citizens' memories so the Cybervillains can steal three mega-transporters. Though the Rangers fail to stop them, Devon is able to destroy Vargoyle after he was betrayed by his allies. Months later, Ryjack uses his reanimizer to revive Vargoyle and gives him a compliance collar. Following a successful raid on a Morph-X tower, Vargoyle fights the Rangers again until he is destroyed by Devon and Captain Chaku.

Vargoyle is voiced by Jamie Linehan.

==== Robo-Blaze ====
Robo-Blaze is a robot clone created by Scrozzle from Cybervillain Blaze's back-up data, spare robot parts, and the real Blaze's DNA who can assume an amber-colored robot form while in battle as well as pilot rebuilt versions of his Cybervillain counterpart's Megazord. If he and Robo-Roxy are destroyed, they can be recreated in the Robot Maker machine that created them. To maintain his usefulness to Evox, Robo-Blaze upgrades himself with a large amount of Morph-X, gaining enhanced strength and speed. After Robo-Roxy inadvertently damages the Robot Maker beyond repair due to her Vultursaurus upgrade, Nate is able to permanently destroy Robo-Blaze.

Robo-Blaze is portrayed by Colby Strong.

==== Robo-Roxy ====
Robo-Roxy is a robot clone created by Scrozzle from Cybervillain Roxy's back-up data, spare robot parts, and the real Roxy's DNA who can assume a violet-colored robot form while in battle. If she and Robo-Blaze are destroyed, they can be recreated in the Robot Maker machine that created them.

To maintain her usefulness to Evox, Robo-Roxy upgrades herself with flower DNA, gaining a left arm-mounted pollen cannon. After Robo-Blaze upgrades himself, Robo-Roxy upgrades herself further with DNA of a newly-discovered dinosaur called a Vultursaurus, gaining a reptilian-clawed right hand capable of firing energy projectiles while maintaining her pollen cannon. This ends up costing Evox and Scrozzle the function of the Robot Maker after she accidentally overloads it beyond repair. While fighting the Rangers in her new form, Robo-Roxy uses the full power of the Vultursaurus DNA to enlarge herself into a giant-sized winged form, only to be destroyed by the Beast-X King Ultrazord.

Robo-Roxy is portrayed by Liana Ramirez.

==== Tronics ====
The Tronics are robotic foot soldiers armed with hand-mounted blasters that double as melee weapons. They were created by Scrozzle to protect him from Vargoyle and are used by Evox as his foot soldiers.

==== Gigatronics ====
The Gigatronics are gigantic foot soldiers used to fight the Zords and assist the Alpha Model Gigadrones.

==== Robotrons ====
The Robotrons are robotic monsters created from items infected with a virus developed from Evox.

- Cycletron (voiced by Barry Duffield) - A bicycle-themed Robotron that possesses super-strength, super-speed, and can shoot lasers from his fingers. Scrozzle created him from a stack of car tires to distract the Rangers while he and Cybervillain Blaze escape with Morph-X barrels. Cycletron is destroyed by Devon. Amidst his final battle with the Rangers, Evox rebuilds Cycletron to defend him, but the latter is destroyed by Ravi off-screen.
- Needletron (voiced by Rowan Bettjeman) - A syringe/medical equipment-themed Robotron who can fire a needle blast and a blue energy blast from his arm. Cybervillain Blaze created him from a bicycle pump to steal Morph-X from Zoey's X-Bikes. While Needletron is destroyed by Zoey, Cybervillain Blaze uses his arm to continue his plot before the Rangers destroy it too.
- Shoveltron (voiced by Andre King) - An excavator-themed Robotron with a shovel-like arm and the ability to shoot lasers from his fingers. Cybervillain Roxy created him from an excavator to assist in her plot to obtain a neural aligner and turn Ravi into an Avatar. However, Shoveltron is destroyed by Zoey and Ravi.
- Slicertron (voiced by David Van Horn) - A pizza cutter-themed Robotron armed with a saw arm and saw blades on his head, all of which are capable of slicing through anything. In addition, Slicertron can throw circular saws as projectiles. Cybervillain Blaze created him from a circular saw to cut through Morph-X Towers and steal their Morph-X. However, Slicertron is destroyed by Ravi and Zoey. After downloading his original codes, Evox rebuilds Slicertron to fight the Rangers inside Grid Battleforce, though the Robotron is later destroyed by Evox's shockwave.
- Meltatron (voiced by Ashton Brown) - A fire extinguisher-themed Robotron who can shoot acidic mist from his nozzle. Scrozzle created him from an acid tank he owned to accompany Cybervillain Roxy in infiltrating Grid Battle to reactivate Slicerdrone and distract the Rangers while he stole their technology. Ravi and Zoey destroy Meltatron, but fail to stop Scrozzle.
- Railtron (voiced by Jeremy Birchall) - A train-themed Robotron who can absorb data and convert it into disks, fire train tracks and train wheels from his chest, and enhance his arms with extra armor. The Cybervillains created him from a steam locomotive to steal data on the Beast-X Megazord from the Rangers' Beast Bots. Railtron nearly succeeded, but is destroyed by the Rangers.
- Vacuutron (voiced by Cosme Flores) - A vacuum cleaner-themed Robotron who can drain Morph-X with his vacuum cleaner and wields a staff that doubles as a rifle. He was created off-screen to steal Morph-X from various sources to power Scrozzle's Cybergate as part of his plan to free Evox from the Cyber Dimension. Vacuutron is destroyed by Nate and Steel.
- Antennatron (voiced by Julian Wilson) - An antenna/satellite dish-themed Robotron who wields an antenna-like staff in battle and can tamper with communication systems. The Cybervillains created him from an antenna to tap into Grid Battleforce's radio frequencies so they can kidnap Steel for Evox's use. Antennatron is destroyed by Zoey and Ravi. After downloading his original codes, Evox rebuilds Antennatron to fight the Rangers inside Grid Battleforce, though the Robotron is later destroyed by Evox's shockwave.
- Drilltron (voiced by Daniel Watterson) - A drill-themed Robotron who is armed with a drill-like agitator on his right arm and four smaller drills on his left arm that all allow him to burrow underground. Cybervillain Roxy created him from a cordless drill to help her collect data on the Rangers' animal powers and drill into a Morph-X Tower from below while Drilldrone attacks a separate tower to distract the Rangers. Ravi destroys Drilltron, but the latter successfully collected data on the Blue Ranger's animal power.
- Tooltron (voiced by Darren Young) - A wrench-themed Robotron who wields two wrenches and a wrench-themed blaster that can dismantle anything it hits. Cybervillain Roxy created him from a wrench to dismantle the Rangers' equipment and collect data on Zoey's animal power. Tooltron succeeds in the latter mission before he is destroyed by Devon and Ravi.
- Clonetron (voiced by Hamish McGregor) - A projector/camera-themed Robotron who can holographically mimic anyone he scans and fire lasers from his eye. Cybervillain Blaze created him from a photocopier to infiltrate Grid Battleforce and sabotage their Zord interface computers. Though Clonetron temporarily succeeds, Ravi and Zoey destroy him.
- Tubatron (voiced by Joseph Wycoff) - A tuba-themed Robotron who can fire concussive sonic blasts and possesses super-strength. Cybervillain Roxy created him from a discarded tuba to obtain data on Devon's animal power. When Tubatron proved ineffective in battle however, she has Scrozzle upgrade his horn so his sonic blasts can knock victims unconscious. Though the Robotron succeeds in his mission, the Rangers destroy his data chip along with him.
- Spiketron (voiced by Felix Becroft) - A fork-themed Robotron who has super-strength and can use his trident-like right hand in battle. He was created off-screen to accompany Scrozzle in robbing a Morph-X truck, only to be destroyed by Nate and Steel. After downloading his original codes, Evox rebuilds Spiketron to fight the Rangers inside Grid Battleforce, though the Robotron is later destroyed by Evox's shockwave.
- Tubatron 2.0 (voiced by Joseph Wycoff) - An upgraded version of Tubatron who has super-strength and can fire sonic blasts like the original model. Cybervillain Blaze created him to disable the Rangers' equipment and enhanced him with one of Scrozzle's Fury Cells. Tubatron 2.0 significantly overpowers the Rangers until they steal some of the cells from Blaze and Devon uses one to destroy the Robotron.
- Burnertron (voiced by Cameron Rhodes) - A candle-themed Robotron who is armed with a candle lighter-like arm and wields a lance in battle. Cybervillain Roxy created him from a candle to help her corrupt Devon by making him overuse his Red Fury Mode and collect data on his animal power. Burnertron failed to corrupt Devon, but succeeded in collecting the data before Zoey, Nate, and Steel destroy him.
- Turbotron (voiced by Mark Mitchinson) - A fan-themed Robotron who can fly, wields arm blades, and uses his chest-mounted turbine to generate powerful gusts. He was created off-screen to accompany the Cybervillains into battle. Turbotron attempts to take Smash, but Ravi destroys the Robotron.
- Shockatron (voiced by Paul Harrop) - A cotton candy machine-themed Robotron who wields cotton candy sticks that can redirect energy attacks. He was created off-screen to distract the Rangers while Vargoyle places his Memory Pulsator in position for a future plot. Shockatron is destroyed by Devon, Ravi, and Zoey.
- Infernotron (voiced by Paul Harrop) - A gas cylinder-themed Robotron who is equipped with a flamethrower for a left arm. Scrozzle created the Robotron to help him get revenge on the Rangers for defeating Evox in the season one finale. However, Infernotron is destroyed by Devon. Amidst his final battle with the Rangers, Evox rebuilds Infernotron to defend him, but the latter is destroyed by Devon alongside Bulldozertron.
- Drilltron 2.0 (voiced by Robert Mignault) - A red version of Drilltron who was created off-screen to help Scrozzle steal Morph-X and hide it underground before Zoey and Steel destroy him.
- Trappertron (voiced by Derek Judge) - A cage-themed Robotron who can form cages and shoot lasers from his wrist-mounted blasters. Scrozzle created him from a birdcage to trap the human Blaze and Roxy as well as distract the Rangers while Scrozzle obtains Blaze and Roxy's DNA. Trappertron is destroyed by Devon.
- Gamertron (voiced by Lori Dungey) - A projector-themed Robotron equipped with a chest-mounted scanner that enables her to create hard-light digital clones. Robo-Roxy created her from a game controller equipped with hard-light technology to destroy the Rangers. However, Gamertron is destroyed by Devon, Ravi, and Zoey.
- Keytron (voiced by John Leigh) - A key-themed Robotron who can project a lock beam on any surface to unlock any door and disable technology. Robo-Roxy and Robo-Blaze created him from a padlock to destroy Grid Battleforce from the inside. After Keytron fails in his initial task, Scrozzle disguises him as a human painter (portrayed by Kelson Henderson) and gives him explosive paint, but the Rangers see through the Robotron's disguise and Devon destroys him with Commander Shaw's help. After downloading his original codes, Evox rebuilds Keytron to fight the Rangers inside Grid Battleforce, though the Robotron is later destroyed by Evox's shockwave.
- Digitron (voiced by Joel Tobeck) - An hourglass-themed Robotron who can absorb technology and store their data in a chest-mounted storage tank to enhance himself, stretch his arms, and fire blue energy balls from his hands. He was created off-screen to destroy the Rangers, only to be destroyed by Devon, Ravi, and Zoey in their Beast-X Modes.
- Controlatron (voiced by Rowan Bettjeman) - A puppet-themed Robotron who can create hand puppets to brainwash people through his puppet arm and fire energy slashes from his leg. Scrozzle created him from a hand puppet to control Nate and make him program malware to control the Beast-X King Zord. Devon destroys Controlatron after freeing Nate from the Robotron's control.
- Dumbbelltron (voiced by Dallas Barnett) - A dumbbell-themed Robotron who possesses super strength, explosive dumbbells, and a large weight. He was created off-screen to destroy the Rangers, only to be destroyed by Ravi and Steel. Amidst his final battle with the Rangers, Evox rebuilds Dumbbelltron to defend him, but the latter is destroyed by Ravi and Zoey off-screen.
- Boxertron (voiced by Peter Daube) - A giant stadium-themed Robotron who has an announcer-esque personality, increased fighting capabilities, and the ability to trap people in a boxing ring-like pocket dimension. Robo-Blaze created him from a domed building to destroy the Rangers. However Boxertron is destroyed by the Beast-X King Ultrazord.
- Tiaratron (voiced by Rachelle Duncan) - A tiara-themed Robotron who possesses hand-blades, super-strength, and diamond-like invulnerability. Robo-Roxy created her from a plastic tiara to prevent the Rangers from discovering Evox had possessed Mayor Daniels. However, Tiaratron is destroyed by Ravi in his Beast-X Mode.
- Bulldozertron (voiced by Richard Simpson) - A bulldozer-themed Robotron who has superhuman strength and dozer blade-like arms. He was created off-screen to destroy the Rangers, only to be destroyed by Devon and Zoey in their Beast-X Modes. Amidst his final battle with the Rangers, Evox rebuilds Bulldozertron to defend him, but the latter is destroyed by Devon alongside Infernotron.
- Thieftron (voiced by Thomas Gowing) - A magnifying glass-themed Robotron who wields a cane in battle and can turn invisible. Scrozzle created him off-screen to rob jewelry stores for diamonds to power the reanimizer. However, Thieftron is destroyed by Devon.
- Clawtron (voiced by Mark Wright) - A stag beetle-themed Robotron who has a pincer claw for a right arm, possesses super-strength, and can teleport. Scrozzle created him in the Robot Maker using beetle DNA and Robotron data to assist Robo-Roxy in destroying the Rangers. However, Clawtron is destroyed by Devon and Nate.
- Antennatron 2.0 (voiced by Julian Wilson) - A blue version of Antennatron with arm-mounted blades that Robo-Blaze created to help him steal Morph-X before destroying the Robotron once the job is done.
- Railtron 2.0 (voiced Jeremy Birchall) - A yellow version of Railtron who possesses the ability to shoot electric blasts and run at high-speed. He was created off-screen to steal Morph-X and distract the Rangers while Scrozzle finishes building the Omegadrone. However, Railtron is destroyed by Zoey.

==== Gigadrones ====
The Gigadrones are gigantic robotic monsters sent to aid their Robotron counterparts and steal Morph-X for Evox. When a Robotron is created, Scrozzle can use their data to convert a Gigadrone and send it to the human dimension. Scrozzle possesses four models of Gigadrones: the speed-oriented Alpha Model capable of carrying Gigatronics, the brute force-oriented Beta Model, the well-rounded Gamma Model, and the parasitic Delta Model capable of being stored within other Gigadrones.

- Cycledrone - An Alpha Model Gigadrone created from Cycletron's data that possesses super-strength, super-speed, and can shoot energy blasts from its fingers. Cycledrone is destroyed by the Beast Racer Zord.
- Needledrone - A Beta Model Gigadrone created from Needletron's data that can fire explosive needles, possesses super-strength, and drain Morph-X. Needledrone is destroyed by the Beast Racer Zord.
- Shoveldrone - A Beta Model Gigadrone armed with Shoveltron's arms and missiles. Shoveldrone is dispatched to assist its Robotron counterpart, only to be destroyed by the Beast Racer Zord.
- Slicerdrone - A Gamma Model Gigadrone equipped with Slicertron's saw arm that can project a shield, absorb Morph-X with its optics, and shoot missiles from its left hand. Slicerdrone is dispatched to help its Robotron counterpart fight the Rangers, but is shut down by the Beast Racer Zord and transported to a secret hangar so Grid Battleforce can study it. After Cybervillain Roxy and Meltatron reactivate it, the Gigadrone fights alongside Meltadrone before both are destroyed by the Beast-X Megazord.
- Meltadrone - A Beta Model Gigadrone armed with Meltatron's sprayer arm that is capable of spraying an acid mist. Scrozzle creates Meltadrone to stop Devon from saving his friends from Slicerdrone, only to be destroyed by the Beast-X Megazord.
- Raildrone - An Alpha Model Gigadrone created from Railtron's data capable of shooting a powerful blast from its chest and combining with two Gigatronics to perform a powerful ramming attack. It and the Gigatronics deployed to assist it are destroyed by the Beast-X Megazord.
- Vacuudrone - A Gamma Model Gigadrone armed with Vacuutron's vacuum cleaner that can also drain Morph-X powered machinery. Vacuudrone is deployed to drain Morph-X towers, only to be destroyed by the Beast-X Megazord.
- Antennadrone - An Alpha Model Gigadrone that wields Antennatron's staff. Devon destroys Antennadrone while Nate and Steel destroy its Gigatronics.
- Drilldrone - An Alpha Model Gigadrone armed with Drilltron's drill arms that can burrow underground at super-speed and fire lasers. Drilldrone is created to assist in Roxy and Drilltron's plan to distract the Rangers, only to be destroyed by the Beast-X Megazord.
- Tooldrone - A Gamma Model Gigadrone armed with Tooltron's wrenches and lasers. Tooldrone is dispatched to attack the Rangers, only to be destroyed by the Beast-X Megazord and Striker Megazord.
  - Tooldrone's Delta Model Gigadrone - A Gigadrone deployed to assist Tooldrone before it is destroyed by the Beast-X Megazord and Striker Megazord.
- Clonedrone - An Alpha Model Gigadrone armed with chest lasers and Clonetron's ability to disguise itself. Clonedrone is deployed to take advantage of the Zord-less Rangers after its Robotron counterpart destroys their Zord interface computer. However, Nate and Steel are able to fix the computer and allow the Rangers to use the Beast-X Megazord to destroy the Gigadrone.
- Tubadrone - A Beta Model Gigadrone armed with Tubatron's ability to fire sonic blasts. Tubadrone is deployed to attack a Morph-X Tower while the Rangers were busy with Tubatron, but the Rangers intercept it with a recording of a tuba to counter its attacks before destroying it with the Beast-X Megazord.
- Spikedrone - A Beta Model Gigadrone armed with Spiketron's trident hand as well as missiles. Spikedrone is deployed to attack Coral Harbor while the Rangers were fighting its Robotron counterpart, only to be destroyed by the Wheeler Zord.
  - Spikedrone's Delta Model Gigadrone - A Gigadrone deployed to assist Spikedrone before it is destroyed by the Wrecker and Jet Zords.
- Tubadrone 2.0 - An Alpha Model Gigadrone armed with Tubatron 2.0's ability to fire sonic blasts. Tubadrone 2.0 is deployed to take advantage of the Rangers after its Robotron counterpart destroyed their gear, only to be destroyed by the Racer Zord.
- Burnerdrone - An Alpha Model Gigadrone created from Burnertron's data equipped with a flamethrower for a right arm and a candlestick-like blade. Burnerdrone and a pair of Gigatronics are deployed to melt a Morph-X Tower, but the latter are destroyed by the Racer Zord while the former is destroyed by the Striker Megazord.
- Turbodrone - A Beta Model Gigadrone equipped with wrist blades and electrical optic beams as well as Turbotron's chest turbine, wings, and flight capability. Turbodrone is deployed to draw the Rangers away from Vargoyle and steal Morph-X, only to be destroyed by the Racer Zord.
- Shockadrone - A Beta Model Gigadrone armed with the ability to absorb energy and Shockatron's energy-redirecting cotton candy sticks. Shockadrone is deployed to distract the Rangers while Vargoyle places his Memory Pulsator in position for a future plot, only to be destroyed by the Racer, Wrecker, and Jet Zords.
- Unidentified Gigadrone 1 - A Gamma Model Gigadrone with an arm cannon. It is dispatched following Vargoyle's destruction and destroyed by the Beast-X Megazord.
- Unidentified Gigadrone 2 - A "bobblehead" Beta Model Gigadrone that is sent to distract the Rangers while Cybervillain Blaze secures three mega transporters for Evox. It is destroyed by the Racer Zord and Striker Megazord.
- Infernodrone - An Alpha Model Gigadrone created from Infernotron's data armed with a chest-mounted flamethrower. Scrozzle creates and pilots Infernodrone to take revenge on the Rangers for defeating Evox in the season one finale. While it is destroyed by the Racer Zord, Scrozzle ejects at the last minute.
- Drilldrone 2.0 - An Alpha Model Gigadrone armed with shoulder-mounted drills and similar capabilities as the previous model. Drilldrone 2.0 is deployed underground to assist Scrozzle in stealing subterranean stores of Morph-X and deploys four Gigatronics as backup before it is destroyed by the Wrecker Zord.
- Trapperdrone - A Beta Model Gigadrone created from Trappertron's data armed with wrist-mounted blasters. Trapperdrone is deployed to destroy the Rangers and target a Morph-X Tower, only to be destroyed by the Beast-X Ultrazord.
- Gamerdrone - A Beta Model Gigadrone created from Gamertron's data that can shoot blaster bolts from its projector lens-like eye and form a dome around itself to drain Morph-X from anything within it. Gamerdrone is created to drain Morph-X in large quantities, only to be destroyed by the Beast-X Ultrazord.
- Keydrone - An Alpha Model Gigadrone armed with Keytron's abilities and Gamerdrone's dome projector. Keydrone is deployed to destroy Grid Battleforce after its Robotron counterpart failed to do so, only to be destroyed by the Beast-X Ultrazord.
- Digidrone - An Alpha Model Gigadrone created from Digitron's data armed with an hourglass-like drill hand. After Digitron is destroyed, Scrozzle saves his data before using it to create Digidrone alongside Controladrone to assist it in battle before it is destroyed by the Striker Megazord.
- Controladrone - A Gamma Model Gigadrone that possesses Controlatron's abilities. Controladrone is deployed alongside Digidrone to steal Morph-X and fight the Rangers before it is destroyed by the Beast-X Megazord.
- Boxertron's Gigadrones - Four Gigadrones that Boxertron creates to destroy the Rangers.
  - Alphadrone - An Alpha Model Gigadrone equipped with a trident arm that is destroyed by the Racer Zord.
  - Betadrone - A Beta Model Gigadrone that wields a dumbbell-esque war club. It is destroyed by Gammadrone after Devon tricks the latter into doing so.
  - Gammadrone - A Gamma Model Gigadrone that utilizes a kickboxing-inspired fighting style. It is destroyed by the Beast-X King Ultrazord.
  - Deltadrone - A Delta Model Gigadrone that utilizes a boxing-inspired fighting style. It is destroyed by the Beast-X King Ultrazord.
- Tiaradrone - A Beta Model Gigadrone created from Tiaratron's data with flight capabilities and tiara-themed drones. Scrozzle deploys it to fight the Rangers. However, it is destroyed by the Racer and Beast-X King Zords.
- Bulldozerdrone - A Delta Model Gigadrone armed with Bulldozertron's arms. Bulldozerdrone is deployed to fight the Rangers and destroyed by the Beast-X King Megazord.
- Unidentified Gigadrone 3 - A Gamma Model Gigadrone that possesses an arm cannon and incredible strength. The Gigadrone is deployed to fight the Rangers and destroyed by the Striker Megazord.
- Unidentified Gigadrone 4 - A Gamma Model Gigadrone with arm-mounted magnets that grant it electromagnetic capabilities. It is deployed to fight the Rangers and destroyed by the Wrecker Zord and the Beast-X Megazord.
- Thiefdrone - An Alpha Model Gigadrone created from Thieftron's data with incredible agility. Thiefdrone is deployed to fight the Rangers and destroyed by the Striker Megazord.
- Clawdrone - A Beta Model Gigadrone created from Clawtron's data armed with head-mounted pincers, flight capabilities, and the ability to fire lasers and optic blasts. Clawdrone is deployed during the Rangers' battle with Clawtron and Robo-Roxy and destroyed by the Beast-X King Zord and Jet Zord.
- Antennadrone 2.0 - A Gamma Model Gigadrone created from Antennatron 2.0's data that wields a laser rifle. It is destroyed by the Racer Zord and the Beast-X King Megazord.
- Omegadrone - Evox's personal Gigadrone armed with cannons and optic lasers. After being deployed, it is lured into the Grid Battleforce hangar, where it overloads and explodes, damaging the Rangers' Megazords in the process.

== Guest characters ==
- Doctor K: A scientist, the creator of Venjix, and ally of the RPM Rangers from another reality. She helps the Beast Morpher Rangers separate Mayor Daniels from Evox and restores Nate's confidence after he discovered he inadvertently created Evox. Doctor K is portrayed by Olivia Tennet, who reprises her role from Power Rangers RPM.
- Ryjack: A rhinoceros-like alien criminal and bounty hunter who joins Evox's ranks after fleeing from Captain Chaku. While fighting the Rangers, Ryjack uses an enlargement device to make himself grow. However, he is destroyed by the Beast-X Ultrazord while Scrozzle claims his reanimizer. Ryjack is voiced by Kevin Keys.
  - Vivix: Paramecium-themed foot soldiers who served in Sledge's crew and previously fought the Dino Charge Rangers. They are revived by Ryjack to assist him in fighting the Beast Morpher Rangers.
  - Putty Patrollers: Clay golem-themed foot soldiers who served Rita Repulsa and previously fought the original Power Rangers. They are revived by Ryjack to assist him in fighting the Beast Morpher Rangers.
  - Triptoids: Amoeba-themed foot soldiers who served Mesogog, later Zeltrax, and previously fought the Dino Thunder Rangers. They are revived by Ryjack to assist him in fighting the Beast Morpher Rangers.
- Captain Chaku: An alien cyborg and a member of the G5 Galaxy Police Force who arrives on Earth to hunt down Ryjack. As a member of the G5 Galaxy Police Force, Chaku can transform into an armored form and commands a personal Zord called the Reptillobeast, which has a spaceship form and a Chinese dragon-like form. Once he succeeds in his mission, Chaku retires and receives help from Nate to remove his cybernetic enhancements so he can return home and reunite with his daughter, Starlight. Captain Chaku is portrayed by Manu Reynaud and voiced by Jack Buchanan. (Note: Captain Chaku is based on the Tokusatsu characters Gavan and Gavan-Type G.)
- Keeper: A dinosaur-like alien and mentor of the Dino Charge Rangers, also from another reality. He is captured by Evox and forced to create the Chimera Zord for him. Keeper is voiced by Richard Simpson, who reprises the role from Power Rangers Dino Charge.
- Sledge's Crew: A group of villains that have previously fought the Dino Charge Rangers and the Ninja Steel Rangers that Evox has revived using Ryjack's Reanimizer to bolster his ranks.
  - Sledge: An intergalactic bounty hunter and arch-enemy of the Dino Charge Rangers. Sledge agrees to serve Evox in exchange for his crew being revived. After the Rangers destroy his aforementioned crew however, Sledge is killed by Goldar Maximus. Sledge is voiced by Adam Gardiner, who reprises the role from Power Rangers Dino Charge.
  - Poisandra: A heart-themed monster and Sledge's fiancée-turned wife. She is revived along with the rest of Sledge's crew to serve Evox, but is later killed by the Rangers. Poisandra is voiced by Jackie Clarke, who reprises the role from Power Rangers Dino Charge.
  - Fury: Sledge's lion/Oni-themed second-in-command. He is revived alongside the rest of Sledge's crew to serve Evox, but is later killed by the Rangers. Fury is voiced by Paul Harrop, who reprises the role from Power Rangers Dino Charge.
  - Wrench: Sledge's wind-up toy-themed technician. He is revived along with the rest of Sledge's crew to serve Evox, but is later killed by the Rangers. Wrench is voiced by Estevez Gillespie, who reprises the role from Power Rangers Dino Charge.
  - Curio: Poisandra's rag doll/scarecrow-themed companion. He is revived along with the rest of Sledge's crew to serve Evox, but is later killed by the Rangers. Curio is voiced by Estevez Gillespie, who reprises the role from Power Rangers Dino Charge.
- Snide: An evil ammonite-themed alternate personality of Heckyl's. He is revived to serve Evox, but is later killed by the Dino Thunder Rangers. Snide is voiced by Campbell Cooley, who reprises the role from Power Rangers Dino Charge.
- Goldar Maximus: A manticore-themed monster and a reincarnated version of the original Goldar. Evox revives him to assist the former in his plans and kill Sledge. However, Goldar Maximus is destroyed by the original, Dino Thunder, and Dino Charge Rangers. Goldar Maximus is voiced by Paul Harrop in "Making Bad" and Adrian Smith in "Grid Connection".
- Legendary Rangers:
  - Tyler Navarro: The Red Dino Charge Ranger. Tyler Navarro is portrayed by Brennan Mejia, who reprises his role from Power Rangers Dino Charge.
  - Chase Randall: The Black Dino Charge Ranger. Chase Randall is portrayed by James Davies, who reprises his role from Power Rangers Dino Charge.
  - Koda: A caveman and the Blue Dino Charge Ranger. Koda is portrayed by Yoshi Sudarso, who reprises his role from Power Rangers Dino Charge.
  - Sir Ivan of Zandar: A medieval knight and the Gold Dino Charge Ranger. Sir Ivan is portrayed by Davi Santos, who reprises his role from Power Rangers Dino Charge.
  - Jason Lee Scott: The original Red Ranger. Jason Lee Scott is portrayed by Austin St. John, who reprises his role from Mighty Morphin Power Rangers.
- Colonel Mason Truman: A colonel of Corinth's defense forces and an ally of the RPM rangers. He assists Ben and Betty in capturing Scrozzle. Colonel Mason Truman is portrayed by James Gaylyn, who reprises his role from Power Rangers RPM.
