= List of Power Rangers Operation Overdrive characters =

Power Rangers Operation Overdrive is the 15th season of Power Rangers, which tells the story of the Overdrive Rangers' quest to collect five jewels connected to a powerful artifact called the Corona Aurora before four villainous factions do so.

== Main characters ==
=== Overdrive Rangers ===
The Operation Overdrive Power Rangers are a group of Rangers based in the fictional city of San Angeles who were genetically enhanced by billionaire Andrew Hartford and tasked with finding five jewels connected to a powerful artifact called the Corona Aurora. To assist them further, the Rangers possess Overdrive Tracker devices, which serve as communicators and morphers to transform into their Ranger forms.

==== Mack Hartford ====
Mackenzie "Mack" Hartford is the outgoing, enthusiastic, and brave yet sheltered Red Overdrive Ranger and the team leader who is later revealed to be an android created by Andrew Hartford and programmed to believe he was his son. Due in part to his pre-programmed memories, he is a fan of adventure novels, among other escapist fantasies. Additionally, he takes criticism harshly, often blaming himself when something goes wrong. Nonetheless, his bravery and tactical thinking often sees him through. Upon learning of the Overdrive Rangers, Mack joins them with encouragement from his confidante and butler, Spencer, and against Andrew's wishes in an effort to prove himself. Over the course of the series, Mack grapples with his father's over-protectiveness, which the former originally sees as a lack of faith in him until he learns of Andrew's true feelings along with his true nature. Following several missions, Mack sacrifices himself to defeat Flurious, but the Sentinel Knight uses the Corona Aurora to revive him and transform him into a human. Following this and the Rangers' retirement, Mack joins Andrew as his adventuring partner.

In combat, Mack possesses super-strength, which he initially believes is the result of genetic enhancement before learning he was upgraded, and wields the Drive Lance. Furthermore, he can combine with the Sentinel Knight to become the Red Sentinel Ranger.

Mack Hartford is portrayed by James Maclurcan in Power Rangers Operation Overdrive and voiced by Nolan North in Power Rangers: Super Legends.

==== Will Aston ====
William "Will" Aston is a suave and quick-witted yet womanizing and cocky spy-for-hire and the Black Overdrive Ranger who appreciates the finer things in life, enjoys any chance to prove his skills against sophisticated security devices, and tries to maintain a superior-minded appearance. Having previously worked alone, he displays vexation towards working with his fellow Rangers and frequently goes off on his own, during which he forms a rivalry with Kamdor. After Mack helps him understand the benefits of working with a team, Will goes on to teach a new team to assist him in his work following the Rangers' retirement.

On his own, Will possesses skill in espionage and several high-tech gadgets. Following Andrew's enhancements, he acquires superhuman hearing and "telescopular" vision. Furthermore, he wields the Drive Slammer hammer and possesses the HoverTek Cycle.

Will Aston is portrayed by Samuell Benta in Power Rangers Operation Overdrive and voiced by Darryl Kurylo in Power Rangers: Super Legends.

==== Dax Lo ====
Dax Lo is a talkative yet enthusiastic stuntman and the Blue Overdrive Ranger who dreams of becoming an actor and appreciates jokes, but can get serious when the situation calls for it. Throughout his time as a Ranger, he develops a minor rivalry with Miratrix after she manipulates him into falling in love with her before retiring as a Ranger and stuntman to pursue directing instead.

On his own, Dax possesses knowledge in stunt work. Following Andrew's enhancements, he acquires superhuman agility and jumping capability. Furthermore, he wields the Drive Vortex gauntlet.

Dax Lo is portrayed by Gareth Yuen.

==== Ronny Robinson ====
Veronica "Ronny" Robinson is a highly competitive yet excitable and joyful racecar driver, the Yellow Overdrive Ranger, and driver for the SHARC, the Rangers' primary transport vehicle. Throughout the series, she slowly tempers her enthusiasm and convinces Tyzonn to join the Rangers before eventually retiring as a Ranger and returning to being a racecar driver once the Rangers' work is done.

Following Andrew's enhancements, she acquires superhuman speed. Furthermore, she wields the Drive Claws.

Ronny Robinson is portrayed by Caitlin Murphy.

==== Rose Ortiz ====
Rose Ortiz is an intelligent yet casual and serious-minded prodigy, the Pink Overdrive Ranger, and technician. Having skipped most of grade school during her childhood, she was forced to grow up quickly. After joining the Rangers, she slowly becomes more outgoing and open with her teammates and develops much of their weaponry, such as Mack's Battlizer, before becoming a teacher following the Rangers' retirement.

On her own, she is a Mensa level genius with an encyclopedic knowledge regarding almost any subject, from geography to the Overdrive equipment. Nonetheless, she can prove dangerous in combat. Following Andrew's enhancements, she gains the ability to turn invisible. Furthermore, she wields the Drive Geyser water gun.

Rose Ortiz is portrayed by Rhoda Montemayor.

==== Tyzonn ====
Tyzonn is an alien from the planet Mercuria who previously worked with the Intergalactic Emergency Responder Squad, a search and rescue team, alongside his fiancée Vella until most of his team were killed by the Fearcats. Ever since, Tyzonn dedicated himself to bringing them to justice. In pursuit of his quest, he tracks them to Earth, where he is captured by Moltor, transformed into a draconic Pachycephalosaurus-themed form, and forced to serve him in exchange for regaining his original form.

While fighting the Overdrive Rangers to retrieve two of the Corona Aurora's jewels, Mack realizes Tyzonn's true nature and uses the jewels' power to revert him to normal. Despite learning Flurious had empowered the Fearcats, Tyzonn initially refuses to work with the Rangers out of fear of losing them as well until Ronny assures him his original team's deaths were not his fault. Following this, he joins them as the silver-colored Mercury Ranger to combat the Fearcats, Moltor, and Flurious and complete the Corona Aurora. In time, Tyzonn is reunited with Vella and, once the Rangers' work is finished, retires to be with her.

On his own, Tyzonn possesses the innate ability to transform his body into mercury. Furthermore, he wields the Drive Detector.

Tyzonn is portrayed by Dwayne Cameron.

== Recurring characters ==
=== Andrew Hartford ===
Andrew Hartford is a pragmatic yet overprotective billionaire adventurer, owner of several corporations, and creator of Mack Hartford, who he created two years prior to the series and led to believe was his son. Six months prior to the series, Andrew found a crown-like artifact called the Corona Aurora, but inadvertently freed two villainous brothers, Flurious and Moltor, from their imprisonment. As atonement, the Corona's guardian, the Sentinel Knight, tasked Andrew with keeping it safe and retrieving its scattered jewels. In pursuit of this, Andrew discovered the Universal Morphin' Grid, developed Ranger technology, and recruited Will Aston, Dax Lo, Ronny Robinson, and Rose Ortiz to become the Overdrive Rangers with the intention of leading them. However, after Mack becomes involved against his wishes, Andrew reluctantly allows him to take his place on the team and uses his wealth and knowledge to provide support for the Rangers.

Andrew Hartford is portrayed by Rod Lousich.

=== Sentinel Knight ===
The Sentinel Knight is the protector of the Corona Aurora. Millennia prior, he took the Corona Aurora to Earth and scattered it and its accompanying jewels across the planet after Flurious and Moltor mounted a failed attempt at stealing it, only to be transformed into monsters and imprisoned on different planets. After Andrew Hartford finds the Corona and inadvertently frees the villains, the Sentinel Knight tasks him with helping him protect the artifact and retrieve the jewels due to losing his physical form. Later in the series, the Overdrive Rangers retrieve a magical sword called Excelsior and fuse it with the Sentinel Knight, granting him a new physical form with the ability to transform into Excelsior for the Rangers to wield in battle and enlarge himself. Additionally, following modifications carried out by Rose Ortiz, he gains the ability to transform into Battlizer armor for Mack Hartford. Once the Corona's jewels are recovered, the Corona itself completed, and Flurious and Moltor defeated, the Sentinel Knight regains his original form and takes the artifact for safekeeping.

The Sentinel Knight is voiced by Nic Sampson.

=== Flurious ===
Flurious is an intelligent yet short-tempered and irritable ice monster. Millennia prior, a human Flurious and his brother Moltor sought out the Corona Aurora, only to be transformed into monsters and imprisoned on separate planets across the galaxy while the Sentinel Knight took the Corona and its jewels to Earth for safekeeping. After Andrew Hartford finds the Corona, he inadvertently frees the brothers from their imprisonment. Renewing his quest for the artifact, Flurious returns to Earth, takes over Norg's cave to establish it as a base for himself, creates monsters called "Chillers" to serve as foot soldiers, invents advanced technology, and battles the Overdrive Rangers. Throughout the series, he forms temporary alliances with Moltor, among others, in an effort into manipulating them into helping him, constructs two giant robots that the Overdrive Rangers ultimately destroy, clashes with Thor, and turns the Fearcats into cyborgs in the hopes that they will serve him, only to be betrayed by them. Eventually, Flurious acquires one of the Corona's jewels and uses it to kill Moltor before mounting an attack on the Rangers to steal the remaining jewels and the Corona. Using their power to evolve into a stronger form, he overpowers the Rangers until Mack sacrifices himself to kill Flurious.

Flurious is portrayed by Gerald Urquhart.

=== Moltor ===
Moltor is a direct, aggressive, vicious, and merciless draconic monster and a former human who competed with his brother Flurious to find the Corona Aurora, only to be transformed into monsters and imprisoned on separate planets. Upon being freed in the present, Moltor returns to Earth, takes up residence in a volcano, captured Vella, used his magic to turn Tyzonn into a reptilian form and enslave him, and mounts several failed attempts at renewing his quest for the Corona until Flurious eventually obtains one of the artifact's jewels and kills Moltor with it.

Moltor is voiced by Mark Ferguson in Power Rangers Operation Overdrive and David Lodge in Power Rangers: Super Legends.

=== Spencer ===
Spencer is the Hartfords' loyal and supportive butler, having served them for many years, and a former member of the Royal Navy who provides assistance to and emotional support for the Overdrive Rangers.

Spencer is portrayed by David Weatherley.

=== Norg ===
Norg is a dimwitted yet kind-hearted and physically strong Yeti who lives in a cave that Flurious took over and claimed as his headquarters. Believing the latter is his friend, Norg makes several attempts at proving their friendship. This eventually culminates in him finding one of the Corona Aurora's jewels, though Flurious attempts to have him killed upon completing the Corona. Fighting off Flurious' Chillers, Norg rescues Vella and brings her to the Overdrive Rangers before taking up residence at Hartford Manor.

Norg is portrayed by Kelson Henderson.

=== Miratrix ===
Miratrix is a warrior and mistress of disguise who loyally serves under Kamdor after he saved her life and assists him in his quest to take the Corona Aurora and its jewels for their own ends. After several failed attempts, Kamdor grows frustrated, leading to her attempting to acquire power from the Octavian Chalice, only to be transformed into an owl-like monster. After being defeated by the Overdrive Rangers and reverting to normal, Kamdor imprisons her in a jewel.

Miratrix is portrayed by Ria Vandervis.

=== Kamdor ===
Kamdor is an armored ninja-like monster who wields two swords that he can combine into a double-bladed naginata and possesses the ability to transform objects into artificial monsters. Sometime prior to the series, he was imprisoned in a jewel while saving Miratrix, who eventually frees him in the present so they can steal the Corona Aurora for their own ends. Throughout the series, he clashes with the Overdrive Rangers, develops a rivalry with Will Aston, viewing him as a worthy opponent, obtains two of the Corona Aurora's jewels before losing one, and mounts several failed attempts at acquiring the rest. Eventually, Kamdor imprisons Miratrix in his jewel for failing him, uses his Corona jewel to summon a meteor to distract the Overdrive Rangers, and faces Will in a duel, during which Kamdor is killed in battle.

Kamdor is primarily voiced by Adam Gardiner while Richard Simpson voiced him in the episode "Pirate in Pink".

=== Fearcats ===
The Fearcats are a race of malicious, sadistic, and ruthless demonic, feline-themed extraterrestrials who willfully destroyed planets and their inhabitants to demonstrate their power, possess the ability to enlarge themselves, and previously encountered Tyzonn. While the majority of them were imprisoned in a mirror-like artifact, Mig and Cheetar travel to Earth to find the Corona Aurora and use its power to free them. Growing impatient, they kidnap Ronny Robinson and use her Ranger powers instead, successfully freeing Benglo before Ronny and Tyzonn destroy the mirror, permanently trapping the imprisoned Fearcats. Undeterred, Cheetar dies fighting the Overdrive Rangers while Flurious uses his technology to transform Mig and Benglo into powerful cyborgs in the hopes that they would serve him. The pair subsequently betray him, stealing his technology to build giant robots to renew their quest for the Corona until they are eventually killed by the Overdrive Rangers.

==== Mig ====
Mig is a cocky, impulsive, and battle-hungry Chinese guardian lion-themed Fearcat who is eventually killed by Tyzonn.

In his original form, Mig can conjure a bazooka-like weapon. In his cyborg form, he wields two pistols that can convert into daggers.

Mig is voiced by Kelson Henderson.

==== Benglo ====
Benglo is a level-headed and serious-minded Bengal tiger-themed Fearcat and primary pilot of the Fearcats' giant robots who is eventually killed by Mack and the Sentinel Knight.

In his original form, Benglo possesses arm-mounted tekkō-kagi-like weapons. In his cyborg form, he wields a sword that can convert into a shotgun.

Benglo is voiced by David Weatherley.

== Guest characters ==
- Lava Lizards – A group of lizard men who serve as Moltor's foot soldiers and are immune to lava.
- Ultrog – A lock/data disk-themed monster that Kamdor created to assist Miratrix in stealing the three Neptune Scrolls. Despite absorbing two of the scrolls and gaining increased power, the Overdrive Rangers use the third scroll to empower the DriveMax Megazord and destroy Ultrog. Ultrog is voiced by Richard Simpson.
- Brownbeard – A ghost pirate who sought out an artifact called the Eye of the Sea before he died on the island where it was located. When the Overdrive Rangers arrive on the island to find the Eye, believing it to be one of the Corona Aurora's jewels, he possesses Rose Ortiz and helps them find it. When the Rangers learn it is not what they are after, they give the Eye to Brownbeard, who gives them his lucky pearl in return, which they discover is their true target. Brownbeard is portrayed by John Leigh.
- Bombardo – A cold and ruthless arquebus/factory-themed monster that Kamdor created from an abandoned pirate ship cannon to help Miratrix steal the Eye of the Sea. Despite using the artifact to upgrade himself, Bombardo is destroyed by the DriveMax Megazord Shovel Formation. Bombardo is voiced by Adam Gardiner.
- Volkan – A Lava Lizard who Moltor evolved into a salamander-themed form after defeating several other Lava Lizards in combat. He is tasked with retrieving the Fire Heart scale before the Overdrive Rangers can do so, only to be killed by Mack. Volkan is voiced by James Gaylyn.
- Scaletex – A lindworm/Velociraptor-themed monster. Moltor sends him to steal an ancient parchment from Kamdor and Miratrix, only to be buried alive amidst a cave-in. Scaletex is voiced by Patrick Kake.
- Bullox – A bull/Nāga-themed monster who wields a scepter and can breathe fire. Moltor sends him to assist Tyzonn in retrieving the Toru Diamond, only to be betrayed by the latter, who joins forces with Mack to defeat him. Bullox enlarges himself, but is killed by the DriveMax Ultrazord. Bullox is voiced by Will Wallace.
- Cheetar – A violent and short-tempered cheetah-themed Fearcat who accompanies Mig to Earth to find the Corona Aurora and free their fellow Fearcats from their mirror prison. Despite freeing Benglo, Ronny and Tyzonn destroy the mirror. Cheetar subsequently sacrifices himself to buy time for his allies to escape. Cheetar is voiced by James Gaylyn.
- Top Hat – A namesake/animal picture book-themed monster with a magician-esque personality that Kamdor created to fight the Overdrive Rangers, who destroy Top Hat with the DriveMax Ultrazord and Flash Point Megazord. Top Hat is voiced by Gregory Cooper.
- Thor – The god of thunder from Norse mythology who wields the hammer Mjölnir, which he lost sometime prior to the series. After the Rangers locate Mjölnir amidst their quest for the Corona Aurora's jewels and his brother Loki impersonates him to steal it, Thor travels to Earth to help the Rangers reclaim it before assisting them in locating the Piedra Aztec del Compás. Thor is portrayed by Mike Edward.
- Loki – The god of mischief from Norse mythology and brother of Thor. Upon learning that the Overdrive Rangers found Mjölnir, Loki impersonates his brother to steal it from them. Mistaking Ronny Robinson for the Norse goddess Freya, Loki demands she marry him. However, the Rangers send a disguised Spencer to retrieve Mjölnir so they can use it in their quest for the Corona Aurora and return it to Thor. Loki is portrayed by Adam Gardiner.
- Blothgarr – A Chinese dragon-themed monster and an old friend of Moltor's capable of breathing fire and summoning lightning. Moltor sends him to steal the Piedra Aztec del Compás, a compass-like relic capable of altering a target's luck. However, the Overdrive Rangers eventually take back the compass and kill Blothgarr. Blothgarr is voiced by Charlie McDermott.
- Generalissimo – A sextant/chalk-themed monster that Kamdor created off-screen to assist him and Miratrix in robbing a museum they believed had one of the Corona Aurora's jewels before he is destroyed by Tyzonn. Generalissimo is voiced by Peter Feeney.
- Thrax – The son of Rita Repulsa and Lord Zedd and grandson of Master Vile who inherited his father's powers and staff. Years prior and similarly to Rita, Thrax was imprisoned on the moon in a space dumpster by the Sentinel Knight. However, Thrax gradually grew stronger as the latter weakened until he eventually breaks free in the present. Seeking to restore his parents' legacy, he forms an alliance with the Overdrive Rangers' enemies and severs the latter's link to the Universal Morphin Grid, de-powering them. However, the Sentinel Knight recruits a team of legendary Rangers to stop them while the Overdrive Rangers restore their powers and locate the sword Excelsior. After combining with it, the Sentinel Knight joins the legendary and Overdrive Rangers in defeating the alliance and killing Thrax. Thrax is portrayed by Glen Levy.
- Xander Bly – An arbormancer from Briarwood and the Green Mystic Ranger. The Sentinel Knight recruits him to join a team of legendary Rangers and help the Overdrive Rangers defeat Thrax. Xander Bly is portrayed by Richard Brancatisano.
- Bridge Carson – A Space Patrol Delta (S.P.D.) officer from New Tech City in the year 2025 who previously operated as the Green and Blue SPD Ranger before being promoted to Red. The Sentinel Knight brings him back in time and recruits him into a team of legendary Rangers to help the Overdrive Rangers defeat Thrax. Bridge Carson is portrayed by Matt Austin.
- Kira Ford – An aspiring musician from Reefside who previously operated as the Yellow Dino Thunder Ranger before losing her powers while defeating Mesogog. The Sentinel Knight restores her powers and recruits her into a team of legendary Rangers to help the Overdrive Rangers defeat Thrax. Kira Ford is portrayed by Emma Lahana.
- Tori Hanson – A master ninja of the Wind Ninja Academy from Blue Bay Harbor who specializes in water-based ninjutsu and previously operated as the Blue Ninja Storm Ranger before losing her powers while defeating Lothor. The Sentinel Knight restores her powers and recruits her into a team of legendary Rangers to help the Overdrive Rangers defeat Thrax. Tori Hanson is portrayed by Sally Martin.
- Adam Park – A veteran Ranger who was chosen to succeed Zack Taylor as the Black Mighty Morphin Ranger and went on to become the Green Zeo and Turbo Ranger before passing the latter mantle to Carlos Vallerte and retiring. The Sentinel Knight restores Adam's original powers and tasks him with leading a team of legendary Rangers to help the Overdrive Rangers defeat Thrax. Following this, Adam opens a dojo with old friend Alpha 6. Adam Park is portrayed by Johnny Yong Bosch.
- Alpha 6 – A robotic ally of the Turbo, Space, and Galaxy Rangers and successor of Alpha 5 who initially operated on Earth before eventually ending up on the Astro Megaship, the space colony Terra Venture, and the alien planet Mirinoi. After being deactivated and returned to Earth off-screen, Adam Park finds and reactivates Alpha 6 to help restore the Overdrive Rangers' connection to the Universal Morphin Grid. Following this, he joins Adam at his new dojo. Alpha 6 is voiced by Campbell Cooley.
- Vulturus / Vulturus Maximus – A dragon/vulture-themed monster created by Thrax who is reputed to be invincible. After overpowering the Rangers' Megazords, it is defeated by Mack via the sword Excelsior. Flurious subsequently uses his technology to turn Vulturus into a cyborg, only for it to be killed by Tyzonn.
- Crazar – A lynx-themed Fearcat who can cast illusions and was presumed dead while causing the cave-in that killed Tyzonn's original team years prior. Having survived and captured Tyzonn's fiancé Vella, Crazar resurfaces in the present to transfer Vella to Moltor's custody and help her fellow Fearcats obtain the Octavian Chalice, only to be eventually killed by Tyzonn. Crazar is voiced by Lori Dungey.
- Vella – Tyzonn's fiancée who worked with him as a rescuer and was originally believed to have been killed by the Fearcats before ending up on Earth as Moltor, later Flurious', captive. After befriending Norg, he helps her escape and brings her to the Overdrive Rangers' custody, upon which she is reunited with Tyzonn. Vella is portrayed by Beth Allen.
- Datum – A computer/amulet-themed monster that Kamdor created to hack the Overdrive Rangers' database, obtain information on the Star of Isis, and disable their technology. Datum succeeds in the first two tasks before he is defeated by Rose Ortiz, enlarged by Kamdor, and destroyed by the BattleFleet Megazord. Datum is voiced by Gerald Urquhart.
- Magmador – A draconic Styracosaurus-themed monster with superhuman strength and tentacles for a right hand that he can turn into various weapons. He accompanies Moltor in obtaining the Tri-Dragon Key. After being defeated by Will, Magmador enlarges, but is killed by the Sentinel Knight and the Flash Point Megazord Crane Formation. Magmador is voiced by Mark Wright.
