= List of Power Rangers Mystic Force characters =

Power Rangers Mystic Force is the 2006 season of Power Rangers which tells the story of the fight between the Mystic Rangers and the evil Forces of Darkness who are trying to rule over the worlds of mortals and magic.

== Mystic Rangers ==
The powers of the Mystic Rangers are derived from beings known as the Ancient Titans, creatures with great elemental powers, symbolized by mythological creatures from various Earth mythologies on the Ranger's visors (the creatures being the phoenix, the sprite, the garuda, the minotaur, and the mermaid). To date, they are the only team of Rangers to not have some kind of team-up special with another Ranger team in their own season.

When morphing, the core five Rangers use their Mystic Morphers' morph Spell Code, "1-2-3" – the incantation is _"Galwit Mysto Ranger"_ and the morph call is "Magical Source, Mystic Force!". The morph call is the same morph call used by Udonna, Daggeron and Leanbow even though the Morphers they use are different.

The Spell Code the core Rangers use to morph into Legend Warrior Mode, whether morphing either from Ranger form or straight from unmorphed civilian form (meaning that the Rangers are bypassing Ranger form, morphing from civilian form to Legend Warrior form), is "1-2-0" – the morph call for Legend Warrior form is "Legendary Source – Mystic Force!" and the incantation is _"Galwit Mysto Neramax"_.

In the events of "Shattered Grid", it is revealed that the Mystic Force team are one of the few who have not yet been attacked by Drakkon's forces, due to the fact that when they answer the late Zordon's summons, the entire team is present, including Udonna as the White Mystic Ranger.

The Mystic Force Rangers made a cameo in the footage in Power Rangers Beast Morphers.

=== Bowen / Nick Russell ===
Bowen / Nick Russell is the Red Mystic Ranger. He is also Madison's love interest. Ever since his parents have been away for business trips and other important things, he has been riding on his motorcycle from relative to relative. Nick arrived in Briarwood to live with his sister on the same day that evil was unleashed. He was the first to volunteer to rescue the old man's brother in the forest. However, Nick did not believe in magic or enough in himself to become a Ranger at the same time that the others did. It wasn't until he had a vision of the other Rangers being badly beaten by Koragg the Knight Wolf that he returned to save them and accepted both the magic and his responsibilities. He now possesses a strong sense of determination and duty – it was he who first decided to fight the dark armies even without his powers in Dark Wish, and who encouraged the others to continue the final battle against Morticon.

Nick works at the Rock-Porium with the other Rangers and spends his spare time fixing his motorcycle. He never had the chance to make any real friends before moving to Briarwood and values the friendships he has – he was the first to befriend the troblin Phineas and was willing to surrender to Oculous in order to save his friends. Although Nick is noted for his honour in combat by Daggeron, he makes an exception for Koragg. The Knight Wolf had repeatedly used magical telepathy to draw Nick into combat and the two had become constant rivals; during Dark Wish, Nick attempted to fight Koragg even though he possessed no magic or Ranger power. Nick has found he can use the connection in reverse, contacting Koragg. His anger regarding Koragg was strong and he once tried to fight Koragg even when he had no magic to help him. Upon discovering Koragg was really Udonna's husband and long-lost hero Leanbow, he refused to believe that his enemy could be on the side of good and was enraged by a suggestion that he was like Leanbow. He was also quite jealous of Daggeron because he was the frog whom Maddie kissed unknowingly.

Nick was adopted as a baby and never knew his birth parents, and he keeps the red blanket his baby self was originally wrapped in for sentimental reasons. He took a while to open up to the Rangers about this. In Heir Apparent, Part II, it was finally revealed that Nick is Bowen, the long-lost son of Leanbow and Udonna, who had been taken to the human realm by Phineas for safe-keeping. He is also "The Light" – the child of the most powerful warrior and the most powerful sorceress, with the potential to destroy the Darkness forever and the primary target for the Ten Terrors. He had conflicting emotions over the discovery and subsequent disappearance of his father and the knowledge that he was Koragg – he had said he didn't care about Leanbow, but alone with Phineas he showed that this was not the truth. His cousin is Clare, which made her mother Niella his deceased aunt.

In the finale battle, Nick was possessed by the Master and was transformed into a new Koragg, destroying villages in the Briarwood forest. He fought his father, destroying Rootcore in the process, before Leanbow freed him from the spell by demorphing and refusing to fight, causing Nick's mind to fight off the spell rather than kill his father. He was pushed to the limit afterward, seeing Udonna captured, the world destroyed and his father briefly killed, but was convinced by Madison that he couldn't give up and that the Rangers needed him to keep fighting; he was able to wound the Master enough to force him to retreat and, in the last clash, led the Rangers in destroying him.

Soon after the final battle, Nick along with Udonna and Leanbow rode off into the sunset on motorcycles to see his adopted parents, believing Maddie has developed feelings for him.

He would later rejoin his teammates in Power Rangers Super Megaforce as part of an army of veteran Rangers who aided the Megaforce Rangers in their final battle with the Armada.

Nick made a cameo in the footage in Power Rangers Beast Morphers.

As the Red Mystic Ranger, Nick wields the power of fire. He is always the first to rush in, using actions before thinking. Several times, he has proven to have far more innate magical power than he should, such as when he instinctively knew the spell to re-seal Morticon in the Underworld, and once being able to tame Koragg's loyal horse Catastros which may be because Koragg (Leanbow) was his father. Nick's weapon is the Magi Staff Striker Sword. His vehicles are the Mystic Racer and the Mystic Speeder.

His Titan forms are the Mystic Phoenix and he also commands Brightstar. As the Red Legend Warrior, Nick gains the Mystic Lion Staff which allows him to use the Fire Storm spell and become the Mystic Firebird. He later gains the power to combine with Fire Heart to become the Red Dragon Fire Ranger, possessing enough power to bring down an army of Hidiacs and Styxoids.

Nick is portrayed by Firass Dirani.

=== Chip Thorn ===
Chip Thorn is the self-proclaimed "superhero expert". He is considered a little odd because he loves fairy tales and phases in and out of reality. His affinity for superheroes had him wearing a superhero costume to university on several occasions, including to the prom. He is the childish one amongst them. He was deemed by Madison as "the perfect example of a non-human species," when she filmed him eating a pizza topped with shrimp, chicken, pepperoni, cheese, and chocolate marshmallows. Chip is a fantastic archer, a member of the chess club at school, and a part of COUNTV – Containment Of Underworld Nocturnal Transylvanian Vampires. He is always cheerful and eager to learn all he can about magic, and began to idolize Daggeron during Soul Specter. After the final battle, he was last seen telling fictionalized tales of his battles as a Power Ranger to ladies from both realms.

Despite their extremely different personalities, Chip has been close friends with Vida ever since she stuck up for him when they were children. When she was turned into a vampire, he showed a far more serious and intense side of himself in his attempts to save her, including taking on Koragg and Necrolai by himself. He is extremely passionate about being a Ranger, taking it much harder than the others when they failed to save people from Gnatu and berating Nick/Bowen for betraying everything they stood for when he wanted to surrender to Oculous.

He later joined the Ranger army in Super Megaforce, battling alongside his teammates to face the Warstar Armada's last army.

As the Yellow Mystic Ranger, Chip wields the power of lightning. His main weapon is the Magi Staff Crossbow. He owns a Mystic Racer and his Titan Form is the Mystic Garuda, which becomes the wings for both the Mystic Dragon and Titan Megazord. As the Yellow Legend Warrior, Chip gains the Mystic Lion Staff, which allows him to cast the Lightning Bolt spell and allows him to join with Vida, Madison and Xander to become the Mystic Lion.

Chip is portrayed by Nic Sampson.

=== Madison "Maddie" Rocca ===
Madison Rocca, sometimes called "Maddie", is Vida's sister. She is also Nick's love interest. Dubbing herself "the sister with the common sense", Madison is a budding filmmaker and prefers to express herself by filming people on her video camera. Because of this, many people, including Leelee and Nick, tease her about "hiding" behind her camera (which Nick later regretted doing when Vida called him out). Madison is studious and shy, and rarely has fun in the conventional way. Despite this, she has shown herself to be one of the more open and friendly of the Rangers; she was the first of the group to reach out to Nick, and was also the one who talked a disgruntled Jenji into coming home. She had harbored a phobia of frogs ever since Vida put one down her shirt when they were children and overcame that fear when she kissed a frog that had saved her from Jester the Pester; the frog reverted to his true form, Daggeron, the Solaris Knight. Madison worries that she is not a vital part of the team, but deep down, she has a true passion for protecting people and it was this that kept her battling against Magma when the rest of the team had fallen. When Nick wanted to give up in the face of the Master's power, Madison refused to let him and told him they needed to keep fighting. It is also shown in the series that she and Nick have budding feelings towards each other, and at the end of the series he left her the baby blanket that had served as his only link to his biological parents for years and promised he would come back for it.

As the Blue Mystic Ranger, Madison wields the power of water. She is usually not the first to engage an enemy, but is a competent fighter nonetheless. Her main weapon is her Magi Staff. She also owns a Mystic Racer and can morph into the Mystic Mermaid, wielding a trident. As the Blue Legend Warrior, Madison gains the Mystic Lion Staff, which allows her to cast the Tidal Wave spell and allows her, Vida, Chip, and Xander to become the Mystic Lion.

She and the other Mystic Rangers later joined the veteran Rangers in Super Megaforce. (Note: She is the second female Blue Ranger after Tori Hanson of Power Rangers Ninja Storm.)

Portrayed by Melanie Vallejo.

=== Vida "V" Rocca ===
Vida Rocca, or just "V" to her fellow Rangers, is Madison's sister and the Pink Mystic Ranger, ironic because she hates the color pink (due to her hair has white/silver bangs). Vida loves to DJ at the Rock-Porium, and is one of Madison's most frequent film subjects. Although she is very no-nonsense, often to the point of bluntness, Vida is kind, generous, and loyal at the core; she defended Madison when she was accused of being withdrawn, and she protected Chip from being picked on when they were at school. Though she initially joined the other Rangers in teasing Xander when he began turning into a tree, thanks to his abuse of Clare's Perfection Potion, Vida was genuinely concerned about him, and was the most active in seeking an antidote for his condition. Most notably, Vida was able to deduce that Matoombo was not truly evil and could be convinced to leave the Master. She then gave him a chance to kill her without a fight in order to make him realize his actions would harm people. By series end, Vida had apparently gotten over her dislike of the color pink, having pink hair bangs in some scenes, and in the end, she dyed all her hair that color, which is similar to Nadira's pink hair style from Power Rangers: Time Force.

She and her teammates joined the Megaforce Rangers and every other previous Ranger team in battling the Armada in Super Megaforce.

As the Pink Mystic Ranger, Vida wields the power of wind. She has shapeshifting powers which allow her to conjure giant, butterfly-shaped "Mystical Wings". She usually rushes into battle, making her an effective fighter.

She owns a Mystic Racer and can change into the Mystic Sprite, which serves as the Mystic Dragon's head. In this form, she can use her shape-shifting magic to become a ball for the others to attack the enemy with. As the Pink Legend Warrior, Vida gains the Mystic Lion Staff which allows her to cast the Whirlwind spell and allows her, Madison, Chip, and Xander to become the Mystic Lion.

Vida is portrayed by Angie Diaz.

=== Alexander "Xander" Bly ===
Alexander "Xander" Bly is an Australian who now lives in the United States. When he first arrived, he was bullied mercilessly about his accent and was often ostracized. Consequently, he understands and sympathizes with loners. He is an adept skateboarder and enjoys showing off when he rides. Xander will use his charming smile to his advantage every chance he gets, and when faced with trouble, he will employ what he calls "Plan Xander", which is nothing more than trying to sweet talk his way out of the situation. Unfortunately for him, "Plan Xander" has been unsuccessful against Necrolai and other minions of Morticon.

Xander works alongside his fellow Rangers at the Rock-Porium, where he prefers to assign tasks to his co-workers, rather than to actually work himself; he refers to this as "supervising". He briefly clashed with Daggeron when the latter became the Rangers' mentor, seemingly out of the blue. Xander's overconfidence and inflated ego have gotten him into danger on several occasions, but his willingness in owning up to his mistakes has earned him several spell codes. After the final battle against the Master, he was promoted to manager of the Rock-Porium.

As the Green Mystic Ranger, Xander wields the power of the earth and can call upon the Mystic Muscles, magically bulking up his muscles to gigantic proportions. His weapon is the Magi Staff Axe. He was the first Mystic Force Ranger to use the Mystic Force Fighters spell code and also owns a Mystic Racer. Xander's Titan form is the Mystic Minotaur, which makes up the bulk of the Mystic Dragon and Titan Megazord formations. As the Green Legend Warrior, Xander gains the Mystic Lion Staff which allows him to cast the Rock Slide spell and allows him to join with Vida, Madison, and Chip to become the Mystic Lion.

Xander appeared alongside former Power Rangers Tori Hanson, Kira Ford, Bridge Carson, and Adam Park in the 15th anniversary special "Once a Ranger" (an episode of Power Rangers Operation Overdrive). When the new villain Thrax disabled the Operation Overdrive Power Rangers' link to the Morphing Grid, Xander was one of five Rangers summoned by the Sentinel Knight to defend Earth in their stead. He was the first of the veteran Rangers to make his entrance, ensnaring Mig the Fearcat in a mass of vines. He later attempted to use "Plan Xander" on a group of Chillers when he and the veteran Rangers were ambushed by them at Angel Grove and was, not surprisingly, unsuccessful.

During the climactic battle with Thrax and his allies, Xander teamed up with Will and Dax against the Fearcats. He drew the attention of the Fearcats, using the Mystic Force Fighters to deflect their laser blasts before punching the villains to the ground, giving Will and Dax the openings they needed to use the Drive Slammer and Drive Vortex for the win. After the Rangers' victory, he told the Operation Overdrive Rangers that they were welcome to drop by the Rock-Porium anytime, and he would give them a 10 percent discount.

He and his teammates later joined the final battle against the Warstar Armada in Super Megaforce.

Xander is portrayed by Richard Brancatisano.

=== Daggeron ===
Daggeron is a firm but fair, jolly and wise warrior who trained under Leanbow, and due to this claims to have been "trained by the best." During the Great Battle, he was tasked to take baby Nick/Bowen to safety and was attacked by Calindor. The two of them fought viciously and were dually cursed, ending up sealed in a cave for nineteen years and with Daggeron turned into a frog. When the seal was broken and Madison kissed the frog in gratitude for saving her life, Daggeron reassumed his human form once again. At Udonna's request, he took the Mystic Rangers under his wing, training them to reach their full potential in a tough yet fair manner. He is also a wizard on par with Imperious, and stands alongside Nick as one of the only warriors to defeat Koragg in one-on-one combat.

Daggeron and Imperious are bitter enemies because of their past. In Heir Apparent, Daggeron accepted Imperious' challenge at the Dimension of Wandering Souls to finish what they started 19 years ago, but this was a trap, and Imperious stole the Solar Streak Megazord's power in order to use a forbidden spell to create the Chimera which seemingly destroyed Daggeron. Thanks to Jenji, Daggeron survived and rode the mystical unicorn, Brightstar, to help the Rangers before settling things with Imperious for good in a Bound Battle to the death. Imperious cheated and wounded Daggeron, but through his determination and honor, Daggeron was able to destroy his old enemy.

When Udonna left to find Leanbow, he oversaw the Rangers' activities until her return. He gained a new nemesis in Megahorn of the Ten Terrors, being almost killed by him in their first battle before playing a key role in bringing him down in The Snow Prince. He was killed by the Master in the final battle, but was revived by Necrolai at Leelee's behest. Itassis then approached him, seeking knowledge of courage.

Daggeron would go on to join his students in the final battle with the Warstar Armada in Super Megaforce.

As the Solaris Knight, Daggeron wields the power of the Sun and owns a feline genie named Jenji. In battle, he can convert Jenji's lamp into a blaster called the Solaris Laser Lamp which, in addition to always hitting its intended target, can launch Jenji forth in a bright stream of light in a finishing move called the "Jenji Shining Attack". He was also seen with a knightly sword in one episode when he was in his Mystic Mode. Daggeron pilots the Solar Streak train, which can transform into the Solar Streak Megazord. He uses a Magic Carpet to get around Briarwood, sometimes racing on it with the Mystic Racers. Daggeron also has an Ancient Mystic Mode like Leanbow. He first used it in battle with Imperious, and used it to defeat him. However, despite the power of the Mystic Mode, it was ineffective against Megahorn before Daggeron found out his weak spot.

Daggeron is portrayed by John Tui, who previously portrayed Anubis Cruger in Power Rangers S.P.D.

=== Udonna ===
Peta Rutter as Udonna.

Udonna is the White Mystic Ranger. She was a powerful and talented sorceress whose people fought in the Great Battle against the forces of darkness, which ended with the evil forces being cast into the Underworld. She lost many of her friends in the Battle, as well as her entire family (except her niece Clare); her sister Niella was a powerful sorceress called the Gatekeeper, who sealed the Underworld at the cost of her life, while her husband Leanbow was left inside the Underworld trying to hold the enemy back and her infant son Bowen went missing during the Battle. After this, she prepared for the return of the forces of darkness and built Rootcore deep within the forest near Briarwood; when an earthquake broke the seal and freed the evil forces in present day, she recruited the five Mystic Rangers and gave them their powers.

As the White Mystic Ranger, Udonna commands the power of snow and could become a giant version of herself (not a Mystic Titan like the other Rangers). However, she is defeated in battle by Koragg, who claims her Snow Staff and her Ranger powers along with it. She currently mentors and trains both the Rangers and her niece and apprentice Clare (who became the Gatekeeper of the Underworld upon her mother's death) in the ways of magic. Udonna eventually discovers that Bowen is alive and was taken to the human realm by Phineas, and later still discovers that Nick is Bowen. Udonna is later captured and held a prisoner in the Underworld. While in her cell, she manages to channel the energies of her Snow Staff to help the Rangers fight Morticon. Afterwards, Koragg prevents Udonna from reclaiming her Snow Staff. Udonna then states that she can only feel pity for Koragg and teleports out of the Underworld.

When the Rangers are sent to the Underworld in "Heir Apparent", Udonna uses dark magic to rescue them, even though according to Clare, this would mean she would permanently lose all her magic. She is able to save the Rangers, but is then badly hurt by the Master, only surviving due to the actions of Koragg, who is then revealed to be Leanbow. After the revelation, she is considerably weaker, and it may be true that due to her use of dark magic that she is now merely human. She is left distraught when she sees her husband turned into Koragg once more, but the discovery that Nick is Bowen rekindled her belief in magic and she is able to free Leanbow once again. Despite his apparent death against the Master, she believes him to still be alive and leaves the Rangers to go on a quest to find him (starting in "The Light"), with Clare as her companion. When she and Clare reach the Lake of Lament, they are confronted by Hekatoid, who knocks Clare unconscious and kidnaps Udonna, and put her under a spell to make her unconscious.

The other Rangers attempt to deal with Hekatoid, but it proves useless when he steals their powers. During this time, Leelee, Clare, and Phineas sneak into the Underworld to rescue Udonna. While they can do nothing to help her at first, Leelee produces the Snow Staff (stolen from her mother) and the trio use it to revive Udonna. Udonna, now morphed and with magic once again, reappears in Briarwood and the six Rangers combine their powers to defeat Hekatoid once and for all.

In "The Return", Udonna astral projects to find Leanbow in the Underworld. There, she finds him unconscious and uses the power of her Snow Staff to revive him. In the finale, she fights Sculpin personally, although she tries to reason with him and both are sent to the Underworld. However, Udonna is rescued by Necrolai and Itassis. She helps the other Rangers in destroying the Master. In the end, she goes with her husband and son on motorbikes to visit Nick's foster parents.

Udonna was portrayed by Peta Rutter. (Note: Due to the death of Peta Rutter in 2010, she is not present as part of the Ranger army in Super Megaforce.)

=== Leanbow ===
Leanbow is Udonna's husband, Nick's father, and the mentor of Daggeron and Calindor. He was known for his honor and valor which Calindor resented. As a Mystic, he can assume "Ancient Mystic Mode", resembling a red/purple fiery demon wielding a knightly sword and shield. Twenty years prior to the series, Leanbow led the other Mystics in the Great Battle against the Supreme Master of the Underworld, and his Forces of Darkness led by Morticon in order to prevent them entering the human realm. The forces of good magic eventually forced the Forces of Darkness through the Gate of the Underworld, with Leanbow personally taking on Morticon at one point. In order to keep the Forces of Darkness from escaping the Underworld, he held back the Darkness hordes from the Gate while Niella the Gatekeeper sealed both it and Leanbow into the Underworld. In this single act, Leanbow would be lost to the Forces of Darkness and Niella would use up the rest of her powers as the Gatekeeper, giving up her life force in the process.

For twenty years, Udonna and the others thought that they had lost Leanbow forever, killed in the battle that ensued behind the gate. But in reality, Leanbow had survived to reach and seal the Master – but before he fell, the Master was able to transform his enemy into his most loyal minion, Koragg. Though devoid of the memories of his old self, Koragg retained a few aspects of his previous life such as honor manifest in refusal to destroy a foe he considers to be weaker, citing such an action as a waste of his time and energy. In Koragg's Trial, he revealed that he felt it was important to be honorable because only an honorable warrior could be trusted to serve the Master faithfully.

This also allowed him to tame the wild horse Catastros, which became Koragg's personal Zord and gave him the ability to form the Centaurus Wolf Megazord and combine with Catastros to gain a centaur-like appearance.

Koragg was the first villain released after years of imprisonment when the seal of the Underworld was cracked by the earthquake that hit Briarwood. Upon engaging Udonna as the White Mystic Ranger, who seemed familiar to him, in battle, he bested her and stole her Snow Staff but spared her life.

Koragg often openly dueled with Morticon in a power struggle, shows contempt toward Necrolai, and bowed to no one except the Master. He has also lied to Morticon, keeping the Megazord power he stole from the Rangers for himself and claiming it was gone instead of using it to free Morticon. Despite this, however, he proved to be a loyal servant of the Master and a persistent antagonist for the Rangers. However strong the Rangers got, Koragg was always stronger, with the Master personally giving Koragg more power every day.

When Imperious succeeded in transporting the Rangers to the Underworld, during the 2-part "Heir Apparent", so he could use their Legend Warrior powers to revive the Master, Udonna attempted to stop it only to be attacked by the Master himself. After an onslaught of forgotten memories flooded his mind, Koragg came to their aid at the last second. With the evil influence that had bound him now broken, Koragg revealed himself to be none other than Leanbow, shocking everyone present. He transported everyone out of the Underworld but despite that, Nick refused to trust him and viewed his reappearance to be "one of Koragg's tricks". Leanbow revealed his past about how he was transformed into Koragg by the Master, but when he absorbed the Virus that Imperious used on the Manticore Megazord to save them, it caused a unique side effect that caused him to regain his memory bit by bit. Leanbow was quickly taken back to the Underworld and transformed into Koragg again, leading to a final confrontation between him and Nick. He was on the verge of killing the Red Ranger when Udonna intervened and revealed that Nick was, in fact, their son Bowen, and the knowledge of this freed Leanbow from the Master's spell once more. The reunion was short-lived as the Master began to tear his way out of the Underworld and Leanbow, using a spell to prevent Udonna and the Rangers from intervening, travelled back to the Underworld to fight and seal the villain once again. With his Mystic Force Fire Strike attack, he sacrificed himself to bring down the Master and nearly all of the Underworld, and returning the Legend Warrior powers to the Rangers.

While he appeared to be dead, Udonna firmly believed he "will return" and has gone on a quest to "bring him home". Her belief is confirmed in "Hard Heads" when the villainous Terror, Sculpin, scried to see what was preventing the resurrection of the Master. At the Lake of Lament, it was revealed that Leanbow is responsible for preventing the Master from being resurrected. Now Leanbow wears Koragg's violet Knight Wolf armor, but still fights on the side of good, stating "I wear the armor of Koragg, but my heart is that of Leanbow".

In "The Snow Prince", Sculpin confronted Leanbow at the Lake of Lament taunting him with images of Megahorn's rampage. Leanbow refused to leave his post, but Sculpin persisted and showed Nick being injured during the battle. Nonetheless he still refused to come out of hiding. It wasn't until Sculpin raised the stakes and dispatched Black Lance to assist Megahorn did Leanbow finally leave his post and join the Rangers in battle. Leanbow appeared in the form of the Knight Wolf Centaur and engaged the chariot-riding Black Lance in battle. Leanbow eventually destroyed Black Lance's chariot and then transformed into the Centaurus Wolf Megazord. Maintaining the upper hand, he had Black Lance under control. Meanwhile, Necrolai appeared and planted onto the Centaurus Wolf Megazord a fish scale Sculpin had given her. Leanbow returned the underworld, purposely dragging Black Lance down with him. As he departed, Leanbow told the Rangers that he was proud of them and to continue the fight.

In "Light Source," Leanbow (still wearing the armor of Koragg) hid himself deep within the depths of the Underworld within a crystal-like barrier. Since one of Sculpin's fish scales was on him, Leanbow was discovered by Necrolai, who then informed Sculpin and the other Terrors of his whereabouts. Sculpin, Gekkor and Matoombo then went to Leanbow to personally fight him and to retrieve the Master's spirit from his body. Gekkor was the first to fight Leanbow, using his lightning speed to give him an edge. But Leanbow was able to weaken Gekkor by slashing him in the stomach with his Knight Saber, then summoning a Mystic Force Fire Strike attack to weaken him. This was when Sculpin stopped Gekkor from fighting and sent Matoombo to fight him. Matoombo was able to give Leanbow an even greater challenge, using his superior strength to bring Leanbow to his knees and to shatter his shield. This left Leanbow open for Sculpin to stab him in the back with his trident and extract the Master's spirit from his body, causing Leanbow to revert to his Ancient Mystic Mode. Sculpin then used his trident to create a fissure in the ground and send Leanbow plummeting into it, but before he fell too far, Leanbow grasped an outcropping, hanging on for dear life.

In the episode "The Return," Leanbow joins forces with the Mystic Rangers. While the Legend Warriors are facing Gekkor of the Ten Terrors in battle, Udonna finds and revives Leanbow using her good magic. The Legend Warriors find themselves overpowered, and are spared from certain doom once Leanbow appears and absorbs a flame attack Gekkor fired at them. Utilizing a new red Morpher, Leanbow transforms into the Wolf Warrior, a new form in which he bears armor almost exactly the same as Koragg's with the major difference being its crimson color. After displaying this new form, Leanbow quickly defeats Gekkor.

Leanbow was forced to face Koragg again when the Master (attempting a pre-emptive strike) turned Nick into a new Koragg and used him to destroy villages in the Briarwood forest. The battle between Leanbow and the new Koragg devastated Rootcore before he freed his son by demorphing and allowing himself to be killed without a fight causing Nick's mind to break free of the Master's control. He then went with Daggeron to the Mystic Realm to face the Master, only to have his magic drained and be killed in battle. Revived by Necrolai, he joined in the final battle against the Master and helped overload him with good magic. In the aftermath, Leanbow joined his wife and son in leaving Briarwood to visit Nick's adoptive parents.

Like his wife, he was absent from the final battle of Super Megaforce, though his powers were employed by Silver Megaforce Ranger Orion.

Leanbow is portrayed by Chris Graham & Geoffrey Dolan.

== Allies of the Power Rangers ==
=== Niella ===
Niella was the Gatekeeper of the Underworld and Udonna's sister, Nick Russell's maternal aunt, and Leanbow's sister-in-law. When Leanbow went into the Gates, he told her to seal the Gate with a spell, in which she sacrificed herself to make the spell work. Only her daughter Clare remains. Like Clare, Niella had an Ancient Mystic Mode dubbed the "Shining Moon Warrior". Clare for a long time believed she was more incompetent with her magical abilities unlike Niella. This was until Udonna admitted that her mother was about the same way when she first started.

Niella (like Clare) was portrayed by Antonia Prebble.

=== The Snow Prince ===
The Snow Prince was mentor to all the Mystics including Leanbow. Currently, he resides in a parallel dimension he calls "The North."

For one day, he allowed Nick to teach Daggeron rather than vice versa. This was actually to teach Daggeron how to follow his instincts as Nick does. The Snow Prince also helped aid the rangers in fighting Megahorn and seemed to be a capable combatant in his own right. However, he noted that his powers were far weaker in our dimension than they were in his own. Thus, he used a spell attack called the Ancient Spell Seal—similar to the Titan Megazord's Mystic Spell Seal attack—to suck Megahorn into the North, however temporarily. After Daggeron finally learned his lesson, Snow Prince graciously allowed him to join the fight against Megahorn and then returned to his own dimension.

In the finale "Mystic Fate," he was sent back to the human realm by the "Mystic Mother" severely hurt to forewarn them of the impending disaster.

The Snow Prince is voiced by Paolo Rotondo.

=== The Mystic Mother ===
The Mystic Mother, the "Empress of All Good Magic", is a colossal being who rules over the Magic World and first appears in the finale episode "Mystic Fate". Udonna has stated that in the "dark days", the Mystic Mother was known as Rita Repulsa. The Mother herself remarked that she knew "firsthand the weakness of Evil," and told the Master that he was giving her a headache. She was overwhelmed by the Master and seemingly killed, but was later revealed to have secretly escaped to regroup making Clare a "full" sorceress as she did. Her demeanor is that of a somewhat complacent, smug, but powerful enchantress.

She is portrayed in Japanese Mahou Sentai Magiranger footage by Machiko Soga, the same actress who portrayed Bandora in Kyōryū Sentai Zyuranger and thus Rita Repulsa in the first season of Mighty Morphin Power Rangers. Mystic Mother was voiced by Susan Brady. (Note: Her headache and the other details mentioned above imply that she and Rita Repulsa are one and the same.)

=== The Mystics ===
The Mystics were five warriors that fought in the Great Battle against the forces of darkness, each symbolized by their own color and elemental affinity. They were led by Leanbow, the Red Mystic. The names of the Pink, Yellow, Green, and Blue Mystics' identities are unknown.

In Heir Apparent, Part I, viewers were able to get a clear view of the Mystics. Leanbow was the Red Mystic; the Yellow, and Green Mystics were also men; the Blue and Pink Mystics were women.

=== Clare Langtree ===
Clare Langtree, the Gatekeeper is a fictional character from the television series Power Rangers Mystic Force. She is a human sorceress in training, is offbeat, clumsy and bumbling, yet never gives up. She is both niece and apprentice to Udonna, the sorceress. She once feared that she was far worse with magic than her mother Niella, but has recently discovered she was just as clumsy as Clare when she first started practicing magic.

Clare was originally just a comic relief character, with her poor spellcasting abilities serving as her gag. It was later revealed she was the heir to the role of the Gatekeeper, and that her mother had died using her powers to seal the Morlocks within the Underworld. As the Gatekeeper's daughter, Clare was the only one who could undo the seal. Udonna had promised to keep her from harm and to only give her the Gatekeeper powers when she was ready, but the machinations of Morticon forced Clare to inherit the powers early. Donning a mystical tiara that granted her the Gatekeeper powers, Clare proved herself to be highly courageous and powerful, taking on evil with determination and focus in her desire to rescue a captured Udonna. She weakened Necrolai and took away the Vampire Queen's new powers, but did not come out so well against Koragg. Beaten, she was used to unlock the gate to the Underworld and unleash Morticon's forces. With Nick's help, she was able to get free and used up the last of the tiara's powers to seal the gate once more.

Even with the Gatekeeper powers gone, she still is an important ally to the Rangers and continues to resiliently work on her magic. She was responsible for hatching the baby Fire Heart, which imprinted on her as its mother, and took care of it as an infant. Even after Fire Heart grew up and is now many times her size, Clare still cares for it.

Since Udonna lost her powers after using a powerful dark magic spell, Clare has recently become a much more competent sorceress, joining Udonna on her quest to find her husband, Leanbow. When the two reached the Lake of Lament, however, Hekatoid, one of the Ten Terrors, appeared. He knocked Clare unconscious and proceeded to kidnap Udonna.

In "Light Source," she, Phineas, and Leelee, traveled to the Underworld to rescue Udonna. While they could do nothing to help her at first, Leelee produced the Snow Staff, stolen from her mother, and the trio used it to revive her. After this, Leelee, Phineas, and Clare returned to Rootcore with the newly reenergized White Ranger.

During the final battle in "Mystic Fate Pt. II", the Mystic Mother grants Clare the power of a Sorceress. After Udonna leaves Rootcore with Nick and Leanbow, she becomes the new Sorceress of Rootcore, turning the Xenotome to its final page in the last scene and successfully performing the vanishing spell that she was unable to accomplish in the first episode.

She is portrayed by Antonia Prebble, who previously voiced Nova, The Nova Ranger from Power Rangers: S.P.D.

=== Toby Slambrook ===
Toby Slambrook is a human in Briarwood that owns the "Rock Porium" music store where he employs the five core Rangers, unaware of the team's secret Ranger identities. He sometimes helps the Rangers in their battle against the undead without realizing that he has done so. He usually provides the Rangers with his own brand of humorous advice, and defended Nick when the others believed he stole money from the store. He is known for his musical knowledge and references, as well as for being a major fan of fictional rock-n-roller "Jake Bonebreaker". Although Toby may seem slow-witted, he is actually a good puzzle solver, though he sometimes seems slightly obsessive and can easily be distracted by the mention of a riddle he has yet to solve. Despite not being a wizard, he unwittingly seems to have a lot of contact with the magical world outside of Briarwood. He was seemingly the only one who heard the Solar Streak's engine when Daggeron transported the other Rangers. He is also notable for being the one who solved the puzzle leading to the Fire Heart. Toby was once mistaken for being the Gatekeeper, and once met and escorted Phineas to the dentist.

When Imperious used Jenji to create a world where the Power Rangers did not exist, it allowed the forces of darkness to conquer the world. In Briarwood, music was outlawed, but Toby secretly kept a small music box for his own amusement. Upon being caught by Necrolai, he was to be taken to the mines. Hearing him plead for help, Nick led the other Rangers to fight back. This convinced the Tribunal of Magic to reverse Imperious' wish, thus restoring the Rangers' powers.

In "The Light," Toby seemed suspicious of his employees' disappearance; therefore he hired Leelee to fill in their place. In "Light Source" Pt. 2, the Rangers were finally ready to tell him their secret. However, when he asked them to morph as proof, they explained that a powerful villain called Hekatoid had stolen their powers, which he disbelieved. According to him, the 'real' Power Rangers would handle the situation, thus once again helping the Rangers without realizing it. Ultimately, he did happen to see them morph after they regained their powers. By "The Return", he had complete knowledge of the Rangers' task.

Later, Toby hires Phineas to work in his shop which proves disastrous when customers are frightened by Phineas' appearance. Toby reluctantly dismisses Phineas to keep his business intact. During the final battle, Toby had convinced the humans of Briarwood that the spirits of the nearby forest were not their enemy, and that the two populations shared a common foe; this being the Master of the Underworld. The faith of the two populations in the Power Rangers re-created the Rangers' magic, which had been nearly destroyed, enabling them to overwhelm and annihilate the Master.

After the battle, Toby rehired Phineas and hired a revived Matoomba and several other spirits to work in his shop. He also began dating the reformed (and now human-looking) Necrolai.

In the Power Rangers: Operation Overdrive episode "At All Cost," Toby was referenced as the record-store owner who sold the dragon scale from Fire Heart to Andrew Hartford for use with the Defender Vest.

Toby is portrayed by Barnie Duncan, who previously played Piggy in Power Rangers S.P.D.

=== Phineas ===
Phineas is a Troblin (a half-Troll, half-Goblin creature) who roams the woods outside of Briarwood in the magical realm where he was rejected by humans, spirits, and even the trolls and goblins.

He first appeared saving Clare from the Hydra Worm and later met Nick, whose friend he became. It was Phineas who told Nick that Necrolai and Koragg serve an even greater evil called the Supreme Master of the Underworld. Phineas befriended the other Rangers when Nick and Catastros were trapped in another dimension and later helped all the Rangers on their quest for the Fire Heart, during which he displayed impressive acrobatic skills.

In the episode "Scaredy Cat," Phineas is taken to a human dentist so as to have his teeth attended. He was escorted by Toby who believed that Phineas was "Xander's uncle from the Old Country". At the dentist's office, Phineas is revealed to have eighty-three teeth of which not all of those teeth are his. Phineas was later escorted to the Rock Porium by Toby, where became a fan of rock music after hearing it for the first time. Phineas is a little clumsy and has a dry sense of humor, but is quite cunning.

Whereas Phineas' origins and early history are not entirely known, he seems to have a strong connection with the Mystics and the Great Battle. He has told Clare that he was present during the war between the Mystics and the forces of the Underworld and personally witnessed Calindor's betrayal of Daggeron; later, in Ranger Down, Phineas admitted to Daggeron and Udonna that, during Daggeron and Calindor's battle, he took Udonna's baby Bowen to the human realm for safety.

In "Dark Wish," Phineas found Koragg insensate after the latter was defeated by Fightoe and 50-Below. Phineas seemed to have a little respect for the dark knight, which he showed by attempting to give him a eulogy (Even someone bad had a redeeming quality, such as Koragg's honor, it's the right thing to do to try honoring their memory with a speech). He was about to take Koragg's Wolf Saber when the knight, revealed to be alive, woke and frightened him. Koragg, too injured to save himself, asked Phineas for help, to which the half-breed reluctantly agreed. When Imperious used Jenji to create a world wherein the Power Rangers did not exist, it created a new timeline wherein Koragg and Phineas were allies. Koragg was aware of the legend of the five Mystic Warriors, of which he told Phineas. When Koragg sent the Rangers to the dimension where the Tribunal of Magic could be found, he broke his alliance with Phineas, who seemed saddened to say goodbye to his "friend".

Later, after the Ten Terrors had revealed themselves to the surface world, it was Phineas who revealed to Nick that he was the being known as "The Light", the son of the mightiest Mystics, who had the potential to single-handedly vanquish evil. In "The Hunter" just as Oculous was about to open fire on Nick, Phineas saved the Ranger from an oncoming bullet and convinced him to not give himself up, based on the premise that all life would be lost if the Light should fall.

In the episode "Light Source", Phineas met Leelee, with whose outcast status he sympathized. During their conversation, Leelee decided that she would rescue Udonna, who had been captured by Hekatoid; Phineas decided that he would tag along. On their way, they encountered Clare, who achieved common ground with Leelee and joined the rescue effort. The three of them infiltrated the cave where Udonna was held and freed her from Hekatoid's entrapments. Before they could free her, they were surrounded by foot soldiers; Phineas singlehandedly defeated these, revealing in its use his prodigious strength, which is implied to have been the cause of Leelee's infatuation with him. Because Udonna was in a catatonic state, the trio used the Snow Staff— stolen from the villains by Leelee— and a spell to reawaken her. At a gathering held after Hekatoid had been defeated, the three had become fast friends and rejoiced over the days' successes.

In "The Return," he came to the Rock Porium with flowers for Leelee, whose sweetheart (according to her) he had become. The Rangers then gave Phineas a job at the store, which he lost when his strange appearance frightened customers. In the final battle, Phineas gathered together the denizens of Briarwood's neighboring forest, convincing them that humans were not their enemy and that the true threat originated from the Master of the Underworld. The combined faith of the two populations re-created the Rangers' magic, which had been depleted, allowing the Rangers to overwhelm the Master of the Underworld. Phineas, among others, was later hired by the Rock Porium.

Phineas is portrayed by Kelson Henderson, who previously portrayed Boom in Power Rangers S.P.D.

=== Fire Heart ===
Fire Heart is a Dragon sought by both the Rangers and the villains, which the Rangers eventually found and took back to Rootcore, where Udonna revealed that it was the last Dragon egg. According to a book in Rootcore that told about dragons, it said that the baby dragon could only be hatched by forcing the egg open with a hammer; a tactic of which Clare did not approve. When Jenji was released in "Scaredy Cat," he told the Rangers that it must be sat on to hatch. Clare did so; therefore when the dragon was released, it came to call her "Mama". She is later shown nursing him.

In "Ranger Down," Jenji took Fire Heart into the forest and abandoned him out of jealousy. Phineas eventually found him, and took care of him for a brief amount of time, even going so far as to sentimentally name him "Phineas Jr." or "P.J." for short. Because of Phineas' care, Fire Heart called Phineas "Daddy". When Phineas lost the dragon, he wandered the forest, looking for 'Phineas Jr.'. He ran into Clare in the process; when the two realized that they were searching for the same dragon, they looked up to see him, now grown to a massive adult size. Due to the fact that he has taken a liking to both Clare and Phineas, Fire Heart more than likely considers the two to be his parents.

When Imperious used Jenji to create a world wherein the Power Rangers never came into their power, it created a new timeline wherein Koragg was the egg's discoverer and dragon's keeper. Because of the new timeline, the dragon did not recognize the Rangers and breathed fire at them when they came too close. Koragg then used a spell to calm or tame the dragon and convince him to work with the Rangers. Fire Heart was revealed to have the power to enter the Tribunal of Magic's dimension, whereupon he did so. On the way there they were attacked by Necrolai, whom Fire Heart vanquished after a fierce aerial battle. After landing the Rangers in the Tribunal's dimension, Fire Heart quickly abandoned them. When the timeline had been restored to its original continuity, Fire Heart worked with the Rangers as if nothing had been otherwise.

In "The Hunter," it is revealed that Fire Heart has the power to combine with Nick's Legend Warrior Mode to form the Red Dragon Fire Ranger.

In the Power Rangers: Operation Overdrive episode At All Cost, Fire Heart is referenced by Andrew Hartford as the source of the dragon scale needed for the Defender Vest. The scale was sold to him by Toby Slambrook. Before it was augmented to the Defender Vest, Fire Heart's scale was stolen by Moltor and Volcon to make Volcon even stronger, but was reclaimed by the Rangers.

=== Jenji ===
A powerful, quick-talking, anthropomorphic cat-like genie, and the Mystic Force Rangers' mascot, Jenji is an old friend of Udonna's and of the other Mystics.

Long ago, Jenji was the most powerful and popular cat in his homeland. Everyone liked him except the Cat King of the land named Rexigan. The jealous King Rexigan had a witch cast a spell over everyone making them believe Jenji had become evil and as a result, Jenji was banished. Later, Daggeron found the nomad Jenji among many riches he had found. Though Daggeron advised him against it, Jenji opened a mystical box that was actually an evil trap, almost destroying himself in the process. Daggeron saved his life by putting him inside a lamp, which changed Jenji into a wish-granting genie. A side-effect of these abilities is that Jenji is bound to the lamp, only able to roam free for two hours at a time, after which he begins to disintegrate into dust. However, it seems that Jenji can be reconstituted if returned to his lamp before disappearing completely.

Daggeron used Jenji's lamp as the key element in sealing himself and Calindor within a sea cave; once the Rangers found the lamp, they broke the seal. Jenji is somewhat cowardly despite his powers and retreated from Imperious in his first appearance, though he eventually managed to overcome his fear. He has the power to grow to the same colossal size as Imperious, as well as turn into an energetic form to be used as Daggeron's finishing move, the "Jenji Shining Attack"; Maddison also used this attack when she saved him, with the normal bright light replaced with bubbles. Despite his goofy personality, Jenji is a capable fighter. He uses his claws in battle and has a technique he dubbed the "Super Cat Attack" wherein he relentlessly assaults his opponents with claws and kicks. When Calindor reappeared, Jenji tried to warn the Rangers and Udonna of Calindor's betrayal but was unable to complete the warning when Calindor dropped a pile of books on top of his lamp. Because of his past banishment, Jenji is extremely needy of affection and therefore has been jealous of Fire Heart. In "Ranger Down" in a comic scene, Jenji meets Piggy in a dumpster in a Briarwood alley whereupon Piggy states that "In twenty years, this place will be crawling with aliens!".

In "Dark Wish," the Rangers wanted to use Jenji against the Four Barbarian Beasts although Daggeron insisted that this was not to be done. When the Rangers fought Fightoe and 50-Below, Daggeron gave in and used Jenji's Shining Attack against the two monsters. However, Fightoe captured Jenji using his magic staff and brought him to the Underworld, where Imperious released him. Being a genie, Jenji was forced to grant his wish: that the Mystic Force Power Rangers never existed. This allowed the forces of darkness to conquer the world. Although Jenji's magic was powerful, it proved reversible by the Tribunal of Magic. When the world was restored, Leelee found Jenji's lamp and released him when he told her that she would receive one wish. As she contemplatively bit her nails, he warned her that she "shouldn't do that". Leelee moaned and told him that it was a "nervous habit", saying that she wished she had never started biting them. Jenji granted this at once; while Leelee's nails grew almost 6 inches long, Jenji fled to the safety of Rootcore.

In "Hard Heads," he was temporarily turned to stone when Serpentina's snakes bit him, whereupon she activated her shield. Upon Serpentina's destruction, he was returned to normal. Jenji later served as supervisor in the "Bound Battle", a duel wherein Imperious and Daggeron fought to the death. He was briefly killed by Sculpin in Mystic Fate, but returned to life along with Daggeron.

Jenji is voiced by Oliver Driver.

=== The Tribunal of Magic ===
The Tribunal of Magic was a group of three powerful, cloaked beings visited by the Rangers in the "Dark Wish" trilogy, who ensure the existence of magic and reside in a separate dimension.

- The red-cloaked member of the Tribunal of Magic is a male who was the most calm and comprehensive of the three.
- The black-cloaked member of the Tribunal of Magic is a male who was the most hotheaded.
- The white-cloaked member of the Tribunal of Magic is a female who was the most compassionate, but was also inquisitive.

The Rangers begged the Tribunal to reverse Imperious' wish and restore color and positive magic to the world. The Tribunal denied this request and returned the Rangers to their altered dimension. When Toby was dragged away by a group of Hidiacs and Styxoids, the Rangers attempted to help their friend and fought hopelessly against the monsters. The Tribunal of Magic then decided that this courage deserved a reward and restored the world to its former state. The Rangers, now morphed, continued to fight the Hidiacs, only to be defeated by 50-Below and Fightoe. When the Rangers realized that they had taken their magic for granted, the Tribunal of Magic decided to give the Rangers a reward and bestowed upon them the spell code for Legend Mode allowing the Mystic Rangers to become the Legend Warriors.

The red Tribunal member was voiced by Michael Morrisey. The black Tribunal member was voiced by Stuart Devenie. The white Tribunal member was voiced by Elizabeth McRae.

=== Leelee Pimvare ===
Leelee Pimvare is the teenage daughter of Necrolai. Previously a frequent shopper at Rock-Porium, of which she later became an employee. While part of the Morlocks for most of the season, she has recently abandoned them for a normal life. Her father was turned into a worm by Necrolai.

It is unclear if she too is a vampire, as she looks human. She has also shown to be a fairly adept fighter, perhaps even on par with her mother, though Necrolai hinted that Leelee's time amongst humans— three months as of that meeting— had made her soft. Both the fact that she was able to fight hand-to-hand with Necrolai and the fact that she is implied to have lost strength lends credit to the theory that she is a vampire, however there is the possibility that she is a Dhampir (half-human, half-vampire), which can fully explain her abilities and human appearance. Aside from these facts, she seems like the average teenage girl. Leelee may have a crush on Nick, as she has flirted with him. She often seems to be vain or obnoxious toward the Rangers.

Leelee has been known to be extremely selfish and trouble-prone, as when she tried to frame Nick for theft so that he be fired from his job and would have time to spend with her. For a period, she took a more active role in the forces of darkness' plotting, such as luring Vida to Flytrap's club so that she would be turned into a vampire under Necrolai's control, aiding Morticon in his attempt to locate the Gatekeeper. Leelee seems to have an uneasy relationship with her mother, who forced her to try to enter a cave to find Imperious' mummy, although evil beings were unable to enter. In addition, when Leelee was turned into a bug by Imperious, Necrolai refused to do anything about it, and when Necrolai gained magic she also transfigured Leelee. Despite that, Leelee appears to have some degree of love for her mother and sounded upset at the thought of leaving her. She also tends to be somewhat incompetent, as in her release of Jenji and her myopic wish that she had never bitten her fingernails.

In "Heir Apparent," the Rangers were captured and discovered she was one of the members of the Forces of Darkness. She showed a desire to keep the Rangers as "pets", but also showed concern as to their condition after their powers were drained. Thereafter her mother, Necrolai, took an extreme interest in the Book of Prophecy. Leelee decided that she could no longer continue her evil ways; angling to make friends, she left the Underworld to work alongside the Rangers at the Rock Porium. Nick initially intended to tell Toby Leelee's secret, but the other Rangers stopped him. Leelee promised that as long as they kept her secret, she would keep theirs. The Rangers are extremely distrustful of her until she proves herself to be a diligent worker.

In "The Hunter," Leelee had been left to mind the store. When the Rangers returned after a battle, they found her exhausted and the Rock Porium clean. She was therefore named "[best] employee of the month".

In "Hard Heads," Leelee felt miserable and lonely; between the Rangers' distrust of her and her mother doting on the Terrors, she seemed to have no one in whom to confide. At the end of the episode, she read the Book of Prophecy, hoping that her future might cheer her up; however, she was instead horrified to discover that she would apparently become "Queen of the Vampires".

In the two-part episode "Light Source," she went up against her mother, defying her destiny to be the Vampire Queen. Leelee helped Clare and Phineas enter the Underworld to find Udonna, who was imprisoned there. They used their combined magic to set her free and energized her using the Snow Staff. Leelee was therefore finally accepted as a friend by the Power Rangers and their allies. In the later episode "The Return", Leelee confirms a rumor planted in "Light Source" that she had made Phineas her paramour.

In "Mystic Fate," her mother defected to the side of good to protect her. Afterwards, the two moved into a Briarwood condo. Phineas remained Leelee's sweetheart, though his open-hearted demeanor apparently prevents any of the then-conventional awkwardness from taking hold.

Leelee is portrayed by Holly Shanahan.

== Forces of Darkness ==
The fictional villains of Mystic Force are demonic beings that dwell underground, known as the Forces of Darkness; they were also referred to as the Morlocks in promotional material, though this reference was never made in the show. Originally, the Forces of Darkness attempted to take over the magical world with their sights set on the human realm as well. But Leanbow, the strongest wizard of those to challenge them, cast a spell to banish them into the Underworld, sealing them for all eternity in a noble sacrifice. Years later, the seal was cracked and they resumed their campaign to finish what they had started.

All members of the Forces of Darkness appear in footage imported from Mystic Force's source material, the 2005 Super Sentai Mahou Sentai Magiranger, in which the characters comprise the Underground Hades Empire Infershia (albeit with different names).

=== Octomus ===
The Supreme Master of the Underworld (AKA Octomus) is the main antagonist of Mystic Force and the true leader of the Forces of Darkness and his minions revere him so much that he has only ever been referred to by his title. He contacts his minions via the white pool at the center of their lair, which turns red to signal his presence. His true form was revealed to be an immense Cthulhu-themed demon with a skull-like face, many tentacles and dragon heads on the end of each tentacle, but usually only his right eye can be seen. His other eye is detach and embedded in Koragg's shield, and one of his fangs was used to make Morticon's sword (which was taken by Koragg when Morticon was destroyed and forged into a new Knight Saber) and quite possibly some of his claws were given to Necrolai, her "Claws of the Master".

He was sealed in his Pit by the efforts of Leanbow at the end of the Great War, when the Forces of Darkness attempted to invade the Surface Realm, but he was able to transform his enemy into his most loyal servant Koragg the Knight Wolf beforehand. He was also responsible for dragging Catastros down to the Underworld. With the Forces of Darkness active once more, their sole motivation is to free their Master.

The Master has often had to intervene to stop his minions squabbling – in one case, Koragg was placed on trial before him, accused of being a failure to the villains' cause, and he made his verdict in Koragg's favor. He also created Imperious out of the mummified remains of Calindor.

To gain the Master's favor after his attempts at usurping him had failed, Imperious proposed the idea of feeding the Ranger's Legend Warrior powers to him, giving him the power to enter the surface world. But when Udonna's interference almost got her killed by the Master himself, Koragg stopped him at the last second and was turned into Leanbow once more. The Master was able to partially emerge onto the surface before Leanbow pulled off the ultimate sacrifice, seemingly destroying himself and the Master. However, the Ten Terrors were confident that by following the Rules of Darkness, they could bring about Master' resurrection.

Nevertheless, in "Hard Heads," a monkey wrench was thrown into the Terrors' works. Sculpin learned that Leanbow, still stuck in the body of Koragg, seems to be somehow preventing the Master's resurrection from beyond the grave. Later, Sculpin located Leanbow in the Underworld, and extracted the Master's spirit, giving it to Gekkor for safe keeping. In "The Return," the Master ultimately chose Matoombo as his vessel/egg and was restored to having a physical body by hatching & tearing his way out of Matoombo's body and starts melting & molding it into his own evil image of a skeletal fallen angel-like beast with a skull-like face, a black mask that concealed his hideous brain and numerous tentacles. He also had two additional eyes on his skull-face to replace his original right eye.

In his final bid for power in "Mystic Fate," the Master first possessed Nick Russell directly and transformed him into a new Koragg – one more sadistic and vicious, who laid waste to parts of the forest and Rootcore before he was saved. While the Rangers were distracted by this, the Master personally went to the Mystic Realm and seemingly destroyed the Mystic Mother, source of all good magic, and when Leanbow & Daggeron arrived to face him he devoured their Knight powers and killed them. Following this, he personally went to Briarwood and attacked the Rangers directly, hurling them into a vision of the future where he had succeeded in destroying the Earth before devastating the Manticore Megazord, devouring part of their magic, and sending the Rangers fleeing.

His victory seemed certain – Nick was able to wound him and have the Rangers sent back to the real world, but at the cost of their magic. However, the Master was undone when it was revealed Itassis & Necrolai had defected from him (causing the resurrection of Daggeron & Leanbow), the Mystic Mother was still alive and both the people of Briarwood and the forest had gathered against him. Regaining their magic from people's belief in them, the Mystic Force Rangers used the Master's devouring of good magic against him by overloading him and causing his destruction.

The Master is voiced by John Leigh in his second form (he never spoke in his original form).

=== Morticon ===
The former general and leader of the dark army, Morticon appears to be an undead cyborg, with the machinery that comprises the bulk of his body fused to what remains of his blue skin, somewhat similar to Dr. Victor Frankenstein's monster. He is known to use a mystical portal to view the world and wields a sword made from one of the Master's fangs. He possesses Herculean strength, able to hurl the Mystic Dragon (with the Mystic Phoenix riding it) with one arm with relative ease and because of his strength and skill in battle, especially with his sword, he considers himself to be the Most Powerful Warrior of All Time.

He initially couldn't leave the Pit because Koragg's magic wasn't strong enough to free him, although he briefly broke through to the surface in giant form when Koragg robbed the Mystic Titans of their Megazord power and used it to free him. However, Nick quickly used a counter-spell to imprison Morticon once more. Morticon had a very short temper, he desperately wanted out of the Underworld and frequently attacked Koragg to get him out. Morticon has also been seen blasting a Styxoid into thin air, and can be very intimidating to the villainous Necrolai. He and Koragg never got along, and have gotten into fights on two occasions.

He was freed again to battle the Power Rangers in "The Gatekeeper" Pt. II. He proved very powerful and was once again in his giant form when he appeared, easily defeating the Titan Megazord uses his own form of the Dark Magic Strike. He batted away the Mystic Dragon with his sword while Nick went to rescue Clare. He was eventually defeated when the Rangers formed the Titan Megazord and, with the help of Udonna, destroyed him. His last words before his destruction were, "The great Morticon has fallen, but the Master will prevail!" All that remained after that was his sword, which Koragg found and claimed for himself.

Morticon is voiced by Andrew Robertt.

=== Imperious / Calindor ===
Referring to himself as the Dark Wizard of the Underworld, Imperious sees magic as a way to grant his own desires for power and glory. He was formerly a friend of Mystics' named Calindor, he himself one of the Mystics in the Great Battle. Fed up of following Leanbow's teachings and corrupted by dark magic because of his arrogance and greed, he betrayed the others and tried to take Bowen to the Underworld. He battled Daggeron over the baby, resulting in both combatants being cursed and sealed in a cave. Nineteen years later after Morticon had been destroyed, Necrolai tricked the Rangers into breaking the seal and retrieved the mummified Calindor. The Master brought him back to life as the mummy-like Imperious to serve as the new leader of the Underworld, a role Imperious took an immediate liking to. Imperious was easily annoyed by Leelee's complaining, turning her into an insect. With the ability to summon and free monsters (including himself) from the Underworld, Imperious wasn't hindered by a focus on escaping the Underworld like Morticon was, and focused more on direct attacks on the civilians of Briarwood.

In "Long Ago," Imperious briefly reassumed his previous identity as Calindor to gain Udonna and the other Rangers' trust, intending to poison Udonna, frame Daggeron as the traitor and steal the Xenotome. Luckily, Clare worked out his true nature and found out from Phineas he was the traitor just in time to stop Imperious from poisoning Udonna, and Daggeron prevented him from stealing the Xenotome and rendering the Rangers powerless. After that, he began seeing Daggeron as a personal rival.

In "Ranger Down," he dared Koragg to fight without magic, relying on only his physical strength. Koragg agreed, and his magic was turned into a purple Mystic Morpher that was given to Necrolai. Unbeknownst to Koragg, this was just the first step in a much larger plan – to destroy the Master and rule the world on his own. In the next step of Imperious' plan, he released the four Barbarian Beasts. Warmax and Shrieker were sent to battle the Rangers first, wearing them down, while he secretly dispatched both Fightoe and 50-Below to take out Koragg so he couldn't interfere. Imperious then sent them to battle the Rangers, knowing that their laziness and battle fatigue would cause them to summon Jenji – at which point Fightoe captured him and took him to the Underworld, where Imperious used Jenji's power to wish for a world where good magic and everything related to it didn't exist, rendering the Rangers powerless. This allowed the forces of darkness to conquer the world – Rootcore was reduced to rubble and the Rock Porium vanished, color was nonexistent, humanity was enslaved and music was outlawed. One thing Imperious hadn't counted on was that Koragg had survived and plotted against them, helping the Rangers to reach the Tribunal of Magic and reverse Jenji's wish, after which 50-Below was destroyed. After the battle, Imperious scolded Fightoe for fleeing from battle and destroyed his body and then used Fightoe's soul to power the war machine monster, Ursus, which was also destroyed.

Imperious later attempted to convince the Master that Koragg was incompetent and a traitor in order to get rid of the warrior once more, but failed. Realizing he was unable to destroy the Master as long as Koragg was around and scared of his treachery being found out, he decided to get into the Master's good books instead by raising him out of the Underworld with the Ranger's Legend powers. To that end, he formulated a plan by separating Daggeron from the Rangers and destroying him, while using his power to create the Chimera to help drag the Rangers down into the Underworld; Udonna's interference and Koragg's transformation back into Leanbow freed the Rangers, but the Master was still rising. Imperious was on the verge of triumph when it was discovered Daggeron had in fact survived. Imperious challenged him to a bound battle – the two, in their Ancient Mystic Modes, would be chained together and fight with only swords. Imperious cheated, snatching the Solaris Laser Lamp for use and mocking the idea of fighting with honor. Despite this, Daggeron was able to win and mortally wounded his enemy. Imperious regressed back to Calindor and then into the mummified shell of himself before dissolving to dust as he made a cryptic remark about the coming of the Ten Terrors.

Imperious is a skilled fighter and extremely powerful, as well as supremely arrogant. He balances out his physical strength with magical powers, which is the same kind of magic as the Mystic Rangers' only to a higher degree, and he is willing to use forbidden magic (such as to create the Chimera) and can free banished monsters. He carries around a tessen war fan that he can use it to send magical spells and it can also become a staff that can be used in battle. He can grow to a size more than one hundred times the size of the Titan Megazord. In his first encounter, he easily defeated the Rangers, and only Jenji's surprise attack and the fact his magic hadn't yet returned to full strength (due to being stuck in the cave) drove him back. Despite his new form, he can return to being Calindor at will and use his old Ancient Mystic Mode. In his Ancient Mystic Mode, he uses a knightly sword similar to the one that Daggeron uses and that both used during their final duel, and was able to fight him evenly matched, showing that he hadn't forgotten any of his old fighting skills. (Note: Coincidentally, Imperious is Latin for "controller".)

Calindor is portrayed by Will Hall while Imperious is voiced by Stuart Devenie.

=== Koragg the Knight Wolf ===
Koragg the Knight Wolf is an armored wolf-themed warrior that is loyal to the Supreme Master of the Underworld. He is somewhat similar to the werewolf and the person who serves as his host has a Jekyll and Hyde personality.

- The first host was Leanbow.
- The second host was Nick who the Supreme Master of the Underworld used to attack the local villages in the forests. Leanbow was able to exorcise Koragg from Nick.

In the Power Rangers Beast Morphers episode "Making Bad," Ryjack had Koragg's sword in his possession. While reviewing Koragg's footage, Scrozzle was the one who suggested that they revive him only for Robo-Roxy to mention how Leanbow turned good.

Koragg the Knight Wolf is voiced by Geoffrey Dolan and portrayed by Chris Graham (when possessing Leanbow) and Firass Dirani (when possessing Nick).

=== Necrolai ===
Necrolai is the Dark Mistress of the Underworld and Queen of the Vampires. This spy is frequently disrespected by Koragg and Morticon who constantly call her a "hag". She can fly and usually scouts the area for Morticon. Necrolai is usually the one who brings up monsters and thinks up the schemes. She is a formidable fighter in her own right and has battled the Rangers occasionally. Due to her status as Queen of the Vampires, she is not adversely affected by garlic or sunlight. She was once obliterated by the power of the Dawn Crystal, but managed to reassemble herself during a half moon later that night. Despite her early claims of immortality, she does seem to fear Morticon and, to a lesser extent, Koragg, which would explain why she puts up with their behavior and rarely talks back to them. She showed true fear when Morticon threatened her after her repeated failures against the Rangers. After Morticon was destroyed, she brought the mummy of Calindor from the cave to the Underworld, releasing Imperious.

Necrolai is ambitious, callous, and egocentric; what she does, she does for her own benefit, intending to rise to a position of power. She however is a capable fighter in her own right, even holding her own against the entire Mystic Ranger team on occasion, without the assistance of magic. Much like Scorpina before her, she takes few if any hits during battle. Being afraid of Morticon, she will not seek to rise alone beyond a certain point, but attempts to raise her own status by backing the Master.

Necrolai is also Leelee's mother. The father is seldom mentioned where Necrolai has claimed that she changed him into a worm. Necrolai seems to have little or no regard for her daughter, doing nothing to help Leelee after Imperious turned her into a bug. Necrolai herself transformed Leelee into a bug, testing out the purple Mystic Morpher's powers. After Morticon's demise, she had a minor panic attack over the loss of her leader and expressed to the Master that she did not trust Koragg to lead, and when Imperious arrived, she tried to flatter him into favoring her.

In "Ranger Down", Necrolai received Koragg's magic in the form of a purple Mystic Morpher, but in "Koragg's Trial", Koragg took his magic back to challenge the Rangers' new Legend powers. After pleading his case to the Master, his magic was officially returned to him, and Necrolai was once again without magic.

After Leanbow freed the Rangers from the Underworld, Imperious weakened him, allowing Necrolai to capture Leanbow and bring him back to the pit where he was once again turned into Koragg by the Master.

After the destruction of the Pit and Imperious, Necrolai was shown having a few doubts about her current role, but the discovery of the Book of Prophecy changed all that – ignoring her daughter entirely, she followed the Book's instructions and provoked the Ten Terrors into attacking the Surface. She now appears with Gekkor on excursions to the surface world.

Recently, Necrolai placed a scale on Leanbow, that was given to her by Sculpin, so that the Ten Terrors could track him down and extract the Master's essence from him. They were successful in doing just that.

Necrolai seems to have an inferiority complex with regards to the Ten Terrors as well as a slight fear of them. She believes that by following their orders she will spare herself any wrath they may inflict on her by beckoning to their whim, obeying them more so out of fear than just out of respect for their rank to the Master.

While Necrolai normally seems like she doesn't care about Leelee, it is revealed in "Mystic Fate" that she does care – when Itassis was told to destroy all humans by the Master, Necrolai begged her not destroy Leelee. While Itassis was willing to do so (due to Necrolai's loyalty to the Master), Sculpin demanded Leelee die with the humans as punishment for living with them. As a result, she betrayed the Master to revive Itassis, as well as the dead Leanbow, Daggeron, and Jenji. In the process, she was turned into a human.

Soon after the final battle, she started dating Toby (who called her "Nikki") and both she and Leelee apparently moved into a condo.

Necrolai was voiced by Donogh Rees. Nikki, her human form was portrayed by Brigitte Berger, but voiced by Donogh Rees.

=== The Ten Terrors ===
The Ten Terrors of the Underworld are a Pantheon of ten god-like demons/monsters and the most powerful servants of the Master. They supposedly only existed in the worst of nightmares but were discovered by Necrolai in The Light, dwelling in the Lower Sanctum of the Underworld. They are all normally giant in size, especially in their lair but they can change their size at will to match the height of the Rangers. They are adamant about upholding the Laws of Darkness and are willing to kill each other (and be killed) for transgressing them; it appears that if they don't follow the Rules, there will be dire consequences for them and they may be banished. Their cardinal law is that those who oppose dark magic are to be punished. They appeared on Earth to demonstrate their power and announce themselves. They each wield a different kind of weapon.

In their lair stands a giant stone monolith known as the Stone of Judgment which projects a ball of light that passes over the Ten Terrors, stopping on the weapon of whoever is chosen to punish Earth next, however, in the first part of Mystic Fate the Stone of Judgment is destroyed when The Master used it as a portal into the Underworld, causing it to shatter. They wait for their Master's return and resurrection. Although they easily decimated the Rangers and their Megazords in their first appearance, the Terrors were less successful in individual attacks on the surface world. Nearly all of the Terrors were destroyed, the only Terrors that survived were Itassis and Matoombo as they both eventually defected to the side of good, (although both of them were destroyed at one time, Matoombo was destroyed when Sculpin struck him down and the Master was reborn & hatched in his body and Itassis was slain by the combined strengths of Black Lance and Sculpin).

==== Magma ====
Magma was the first of the Ten Terrors chosen to fight the Mystic Force Power Rangers while Udonna left to find Leanbow. He was an Ifrit (a type of fire genie) who used a club with a ball and chain as his weapon. He shoot out fire from his club, and fire out a spiral blast form fire form his chest. For defense, he can create a shield of heat that can stop almost anything but water-based attacks, although he's durable enough survive the Rangers' Legendary Warriors United Formation attack. When he was sent to punish humans on the surface, he lit a radio tower to show how much time the people had left before he punished them with an attack called "Volcanic Force". He offered to play a game with the Rangers, lighting another radio tower on fire and saying that if even one Ranger was left standing when the tower burned down, the Rangers would win. Magma beat the Rangers fairly easily, but Madison's passion of wanting to save the people of earth compelled her to use a powerful Tidal Wave attack, causing Magma pain due to weakness of water. Out of anger Magma grew to giant size to battle the megazords. He was unaffected by the Manticore Megazord's Striker Spin Attack in this giant form, but as he was about to pummel the Rangers, the other Terrors noticed that the tower had burned out; Magma had lost the game. Sculpin threw his trident at Magma, destroying him. In his dying breath, Magma foreshadowed the challenges the Rangers had to face with the Ten Terrors before he was turned to stone and was destroyed.

Magma was voiced by Greg Smith.

==== Oculous ====
A red-eyed cybernetic Cyclops, Oculous is the sharpshooter of the Ten Terrors and is known as the "Cunning Hunter". He used a sniper rifle with a bayonet as his weapon. When Necrolai first entered the lower sanctum where the Ten Terrors dwelled, he was on the verge of firing on her with his sniper rifle, calling her an "eyesore", before Gekkor intervened. He possesses the power to demolecularise whatever he shoots at and can access another dimension from which he can fire at any target he wants wherever it is.

In "The Hunter," he became the second Terror chosen by the Stone of Judgment to challenge the Rangers, offering to spare their lives if they sacrificed Nick, The Light. The Rangers refused and attempted to escape, but Oculous easily took out Vida, Chip, Xander and Madison from his other dimension, leaving Nick wounded and desperate. When Phineas told Nick to look into his "heart", Nick summoned Fire Heart and combined with him, summoning the Mystic Battlizer and becoming the Red Dragon Fire Ranger. Nick defeated numerous Hidiacs & Styxoids before firing at Oculous, destroying him, and making his friends rematerialized.

Oculous was voiced by Andrew Laing.

==== Serpentina ====
Serpentina is a Gorgon monster with a mirror-coated shield (similar to the Aegis of Athena) for a weapon, which can deflect almost any attack. She is one of the two female terrors, and the slyest of the ten. She speaks in a hissing lisp. She has the ability to morph her lower body in a more serpentine shape (similar to a Nāga) and can shoot purple electricity from her mouth, a technique she calls the "Snake Strike". She also has the ability to send her enemies to her stomach, and the ability to transform herself into a giant snake and can summon many snakes (her "children") and when a victim is bitten by her snakes, she can activate her shield causing all who have been bitten to turn to stone.

In "The Light," she openly said that the Master was growing incompetent. She also seems to not care whether the Master is revived and agreed with Megahorn, both were annoyed that the Terrors should follow the Rules of Darkness according to the Stone of Judgment.

In "Hard Heads," she was the third to be chosen by the Stone of Judgment to face the Power Rangers. She had peered into the Book of Prophecy and realized it was her turn to be chosen, and so tricked Hekatoid to attack before her so that he would be able to get rid of the Rangers before she had to punish the humans. Although she scold Hekatoid for his failure, he did manage to cast a spell on Nick and Vida that caused them to lose their ability to morph, giving the team a disadvantage. On her first appearance on the surface world, she fought Daggeron and the three remaining Rangers, who were forced into their Titan forms, due to Nick and Vida's inability to morph. Nick and Vida used a spell to knock her off balance, and Serpentina attempted to attack them when the other Rangers came to their aid. When Daggeron attempted to use Jenji's Shining Attack, Serpentina managed to get one of her snakes to bite Jenji and then activated her shield, turning Jenji to stone. She then challenged the Rangers by inviting them into her Serpent Dimension where she proceeded to swallow them in her giant snake form. She returned to the human world and set her sights on finishing the job by consuming Nick and Vida while they were still vulnerable, until Itassis intervened, reversing Hekatoid's spell on them. Nick then defeated Serpentina with his Battilizer, causing Serpentina to regurgitate the other Rangers. She then grew into her giant form and summoned her snakes all over Briarwood, but before any of them could bite, Daggeron used the Solar Streak Megazord's furnace blast to suck up Serpentina's shield, causing all of her snakes to vanish. The Rangers then destroyed Serpentina. In her last breath, Serpentina warned the Rangers that Megahorn would avenge her destruction before falling and exploding. Because of her destruction, the spell on Jenji was lifted and he was returned to normal.

Serpentina was voiced by Sally Stockwell.

==== Megahorn ====
Megahorn is one of the most objective in obeying the rules and the most short-tempered. He also looks very similar to a European dragon creature. He has an extendable neck and wings and bonelike armor equipped with what appear to be dragon skulls. While flying, he can fly as fast as the Mystic Dragon. He also wields a jagged sword which looks much like a dragon's tail. Despite Sculpin being the leader, Megahorn is the most powerful of the Ten Terrors and boasts the strongest attack and defense potential among them. By slashing his sword, he is able to create shockwaves or summon green fireballs (his fireballs can defeat the Manticore Megazord in one blast). He also can summon strange black and purple spheres of dark energy. One of his most powerful attacks is the "Lizard Laser", where he blows a powerful blast of green fire from his mouth, and can also breathe powerful blasts of fire or fireballs. During this attack, he fires green lasers from his eyes strong enough to defeat the Solar Streak Megazord. Also, his armor is incredibly durable, able to withstand Daggeron's Ancient Mystic Mode's power, the Maniticore Megazord's Striker Spin attack, and even when the rangers were in Legend Mode and combined their powers with Snow Prince they couldn't hurt him. His armor isn't completely impenetrable, however, an area on the back of his neck was less durable than the rest of his body so it proved to be a weak spot that would lead to his downfall.

He, along with Serpentina, felt annoyed that the Terrors should follow the Rules of Darkness according to the Stone of Judgment. Believing that the Terrors should destroy their enemies at all costs, he is often frustrated by the Stone not picking him yet. He broke the Rules of Darkness once already in "The Hunter." Secretly going up to the surface without being chosen, he fought against Daggeron, who had been busy training with Jenji. He nearly succeeded in destroying Daggeron before Itassis intervened and forced him to leave. Still, Megahorn vowed that he will face the Solaris Knight again.

At the end of "Hard Heads," Serpentina claimed that Megahorn would avenge her defeat.

In "The Snow Prince," Megahorn was at last selected by the Stone of Judgment to attack the Surface World. He was very impressed, even showing the arrogance to rub it in Gekkor's face. The Rangers had little success against him when they fought him at first but Nick managed to reveal a weak spot on the back of his neck when he repeatedly attacked him. Megahorn, however, was able to revert the Rangers from Titan form and Ranger form altogether and prepared to finish them off when the Snow Prince appeared and battled him. Surprisingly, even outside of his dimension the Snow Prince managed hold his own with Megahorn, though the dragon eventually overpowered him. The Snow Prince then transported Megahorn into his dimension and he, along with the Rangers, battled him amongst the snowy plains. Daggeron, however, was excluded because the Snow Prince did not feel he had learned what he needed to know. Megahorn, however, still could not be defeated, easily and defeated the Rangers once again, along with the Snow Prince, and broke free from the Snow Prince's dimension. This was when Daggeron arrived and battled Megahorn himself, repeatedly attacking Megahorn in both his Ranger form (Solaris Knight) and his Ancient Mystic Mode in the same fashion as Nick did. He managed to rediscover Megahorn's weak point, on the back of his neck, and targeted that area and temporarily defeated Megahorn. This did not stop the dragon-like Terror, however, and he grew to giant size to battle the Rangers once more. It was at this time Sculpin sent Black Lance to assist him since he believed two Terrors would be far more successful than one (and it was secretly to draw Leanbow out) much to Megahorn's dismay, thinking he could handle the Rangers on his own. Black Lance was sent back to the Underworld by Leanbow and Daggeron continued fighting Megahorn in the Solar Streak Megazord. Then by holding Megahorn in place, the Manticore Megazord had the perfect opportunity to strike the back of Megahorn's neck, weakening him enough for Daggeron to finally finish him off by using the Furnace Blast to suck Megahorn in the Megazord's engine and destroy him.

Although Megahorn never got along very well with the other Terrors save for Serpentina to some degree, they were shocked that the Rangers were able to defeat him.

Megahorn was voiced by Dallas Barnett.

==== Hekatoid ====
Hekatoid is a gluttonous, turquoise toad monster that wields a hammer that also functions as a trumpet. When Necrolai first met the Ten Terrors, Hekatoid used the trumpet function of his hammer to blow her away. He speaks in a deep, wheezing voice, however, his voice is nowhere near as dark as that of Matoombo. He loves to eat, especially dessert foods such as cakes, pies and donuts and he keeps a large table filled with these items in his personal lair. He is the shortest and fattest of the Ten Terrors. He also enjoys playing games with his opponents. By squeezing his warts, he can squirt various kinds of slime, one brand acts like an acid that is strong enough to dissolve concrete, another can prevent whichever of the Rangers it touches from morphing. He also has the ability to spit large gobs of explosive oily sludge at his enemies and can extend his tongue like a real frog to ensnare his enemies. He also has the ability to conjure huge clouds containing Poisonous Tadpole (his "babies") that would eventually hatch and become Poisonous Frogs, and can also summon evil, black-necked doppelgangers of the Mystic Force Rangers themselves during one of his games. He is easily the weakest of the Terrors, possessing horribly weak stamina (Black Lance noted that he was out of shape), and is easily injured by any attacks the Rangers use.

In "Hard Heads," Hekatoid was scared of snakes. He was tricked into fighting the Rangers by Serpentina since she knew that it would be her turn to be chosen by the Stone of Judgment. He battled Nick and Vida and squirted them with a special slime by squeezing one of his warts, making them unable to morph. However, when the Selection Ceremony to choose Serpentina was underway, he was forced to retreat, return to the lair and will finish them later. Itassis briefly scold him and was able to pry the information that Hekatoid was sent by Serpentina to give her an advantage in the next battle and stated that Seprentina made him do it when give a load of panic.

During "Snow Prince," he continually expressed his concern about how the Terrors that were dispatched seemed to have a disadvantage against the Rangers and was amazed that Megahorn was defeated. At the end of Snow Prince he found Udonna and Clare at the Lake of Lament and attacked them, knocking Clare unconscious then using his long frog tongue to capture Udonna.

In "Light Source," he was the fifth chosen by the Stone of Judgment to attack the surface world. When Hekatoid was chosen, he disliked and complained about having to work when he's pissed, and Matoombo scolded him because of his gluttonous and sloppy habits. Black Lance expressed some concerns that he felt that Hekatoid was not ready because he was greatly out of shape. Hekatoid planned to lure the Rangers to him using the captured Udonna as bait. He challenged the Rangers to a game where they had to battle a large group of Styxoids and Hidiacs within a time limit, which they succeeded in doing. Next he sent them off to fight evil versions of themselves. When the Blue and Yellow Rangers were victorious, the Rangers got to fight Hekatoid himself to reclaim Udonna, but he refused to give up Udonna so easily and their battle took them from Hekatoid's lair back up to the surface. When it seemed that the Rangers finally got Udonna from Hekatoid's grasp, he used one of his sludge balls to send her away again. He also used his power to steal the Ranger's ability to morph, then fled back to his lair. Once there Hekatoid found out that Daggeron and Jenji were using the Solar Streak Megazord to suck up the Poisonous Tadpole eggs in the sky and went back to fight them as a giant. The Solar Streak Megazord used so much power in sucking up the eggs that it didn't have enough power to fight Hekatoid, and so, Hekatoid battled Daggeron on foot. By this time the tadpoles had matured into frogs and began raining down from the sky, but before they could reach the ground, the newly revived Udonna as the White Mystic Ranger used her ice magic to freeze and vaporize the frogs. Knowing Hekatoid was out of shape, the Rangers used their agility and endurance to tire out the toad and take back their Ranger powers. When their powers were returned, Udonna and the Rangers combined their magic to finally destroy Hekatoid.

Hekatoid was voiced by Charlie McDermott.

==== Gekkor ====
A spear-wielding Wyvern creature that wears a visor, Gekkor stopped Oculous from shooting Necrolai with his rifle, willing to lend her an ear. He was also with her on the surface, watching the battle between Magma and the Rangers. Gekkor seems to be the fastest of the Terrors, able to move at lightning speed in battle. Utilising his speed, he was able to overwhelm all the Power Rangers plus Solaris Knight together. He is also able to shoot a barrage of needle-like projectiles and summon forth fiery green energy blasts from his spear. He was the first to mention that the Master was going to return. When Oculous was chosen to be the next to attack by the Stone of Judgment, Gekkor was curious (and seemed somewhat annoyed) that he himself was not chosen to carry out the punishment and was reminded by Matoombo that the Stone of Judgment is never wrong. In The Snow Prince, when Megahorn was selected by the Stone of Judgment to attack the surface, the dragon-like terror boasted proudly about him being chosen and rubbed Gekkor's face in it, to which the wyvern scoffing replied: "Whatever!"

In "Light Source," Sculpin took Gekkor and Matoombo with him to get the Master's spirit from Leanbow. Gekkor battled Leanbow, using his lightning speed to his advantage against the knight. However, Leanbow was able to severely injury Gekkor by striking him in the stomach with his sword then using a fire attack on him. Gekkor claimed that he still could fight but Sculpin stopped him and ordered Matoombo to fight. Gekkor was irritated and jealous that Matoombo got to fight Leanbow. When Sculpin extracted the Master's spirit from Leanbow's body, Sculpin gave Gekkor his spirit to take care of.

In "The Return," Gekkor was the most zealous in punishing the traitorous Matoombo and so he was dispatched to deal with Matoombo, who managed to elude him with the help of Vida and Xander. Gekkor was desperate in his chase, following Vida and Matoombo on board the Solar Streak Megazord and into the Dawn Woods, demonstrating his great speed. However, when he finally caught up with Xander and Matoombo, it turned out that Vida transformed into Matoombo to distract the wyvern-like Terror. Gekkor fought the six main Rangers and nearly swiftly defeating them with a large sphere of green energy, his full power, at them, almost assuring a "Sweet" victory. However, Gekkor was finally killed by the restored Leanbow as the Wolf Warrior with a Blazing Storm Slash.

Gekkor made a cameo in the footage in Power Rangers Beast Morphers in Making Bad.

Gekkor was voiced by Mark Ferguson.

==== Matoombo ====
A powerful green-skinned titan gladiator with gray armor who has an afro-like hairdo and no visible eyes. He had an extremely deep voice. Matoombo referred to himself as the "Energy Warrior of the Underworld" and initially boasted of conquering the world. He wields a double-bladed lance and is the tallest of the Terrors. He is also one of the most physically strong, able to battle Leanbow and give him a challenge, as well as being able to break his shield and is formidable with his staff, able to defeat both the Titan and Solar Streak Megazords with only a one stroke. In Light Source, Matoombo scolded Hekatoid for being such a slob and a glutton after he complained about being chosen by the Stone of Judgment.

When Necrolai found Leanbow in the Underworld, Matoombo, along with Sculpin and Gekkor, went to seek out Leanbow to recapture the Master's spirit that Leanbow held within him. After Gekkor fought against Leanbow for a bit, Sculpin ordered Matoombo to fight him. Matoombo's strength was enough to give Leanbow a challenge, the Titan was even able to shatter Leanbow's shield with his staff, leaving him open for Sculpin to extract the Master's spirit from his body.

In "The Return," Matoombo was the sixth Terror chosen to face the Rangers, and made it clear that he didn't actually want to harm anyone, apparently not realising, until then, that conquering the Earth would hurt people. He initially gathered up electricity to use against the Earth before realizing it. After watching him save a child from being hit by a car, Vida befriended him and convinced him to call off his attacks, and the electricity he gathered. Unfortunately by this point, Matoombo had also been chosen as the new body for the Master, and Gekkor was sent to retrieve him. This led to a protracted chase to an alternate dimension, where Vida (joined by Xander) managed to distract Gekkor long enough for Matoombo to reach the Sleeping Lake where he would slumber eternally, and thus prevent the return of the Master. Unfortunately however, before he could enter the lake, Sculpin appeared and struck him with his spear, thus allowing the Master to reassume a physical form, which he did by growing, breaking & hatching through & from Matoombo's body, and was melted.

At the end of "Mystic Fate," Matoombo was somehow revived and was last seen assisting Vida with DJing at the Rock Porium during the victory party.

Matoombo was voiced by Cameron Rhodes.

==== Itassis ====
Itassis is a Sphinx monster with eyeglasses and a bazooka in the shape of a lion's head. She's a very skilled hand-to-hand fighter, and her bazooka has immense power. The wisest of the ten and working for the Master in pursuit of knowledge rather than power, Itassis makes sure the other Terrors follow the Rules of Darkness – she was the one who stopped Megahorn from destroying Daggeron in order for him not to disrupt the Rules of Darkness. She also was the one who reversed Hekatoid's spell on Nick and Vida that prevented them from being able to morph so that Serpentina would follow the rules. In "Snow Prince," she expressed surprise and concern when Sculpin began to break the Rules of Darkness himself by sending Black Lance to help Megahorn on the surface. Unlike the other Terrors and the Master, Itassis prefers peaceful means to end conflicts and hers is the way of knowledge.

In "The Return," Itassis expressed surprise at the situation between Matoombo and the Rangers. After Vida escaped on the Solar Streak, she made a deal with the Rangers to assist them in return for knowledge – the answer to how, though the Terrors were stronger, the Rangers managed to defeat them time after time. The answer given was their courage, which led them to keep fighting for the sake of others, and she expressed confusion over why anyone would fight to defend a weaker being.

When the Master chose Itassis to destroy the Rangers, she displayed great power in easily defeating the team, including Nick as the Red Dragonfire Ranger, but was confronted by Madison and Nick that she was just a puppet of the Master. She realizes that the Master had been using her and changed sides. However, Black Lance and Sculpin defeat and destroy her after she declares that she will not serve Evil any more. In the end, Necrolai revives Itassis (since she was the only kind to her) and she finally defeats Sculpin. Proclaiming to the Master that "this puppet has cut the strings", she manages to weaken him and send him retreating. She also witnesses the destruction of the Master by the Rangers. Afterwards, she turns good and expresses to Daggeron that she is interested in learning more about courage.

Itassis was voiced by Josephine Daviso.

==== Black Lance ====
Black Lance is a black knight-themed monster (inspired by the legendary horse Sleipnir, evident because his breastplate resembles a horse's head) with a shield and lance and sometimes uses a thin, jagged sword instead of his lance. He also has a Chariot that he rides into battle with that is pulled by horses that appear to be smaller and differently colored versions of Catastros. He is also one of the most powerful of the Terrors, boasting incredible offensive power, able to defeat the Manticore Megazord with one stroke of his lance and also seems to be one of the fastest when he is riding his chariot, he can also shoot lighting from his lance. He has another attack when he leaps into the air and spins around like a screw and drives towards his enemies. His shield is also nearly indestructible. Black Lance seems to act as a war advisor to Sculpin, as well as his right-hand man.

When the Rangers attacked the Ten Terrors with the Manticore Megazord, Black Lance blocked the attack with his shield, then countered with his lance, easily defeating them. In "Snow Prince," Sculpin broke the Rules of Darkness and ordered Black Lance to go to the surface world in order to help Megahorn battle the Rangers. Black Lance was delighted, saying that his stallions needed a little exercise despite Megahorn not wanting his help. Black Lance attacked the Manticore Megazord using his chariot. When it seemed that Black Lance would emerge victorious, Leanbow arrived in the form of Koragg's Knight Wolf Centaur and began attacking Black Lance. The knight accused the former Koragg of being a traitor and used the spikes on the wheels of his chariot to injure him. Leanbow then leapt onto Black Lance's chariot and used his sword to smash one of its wheels, causing the chariot to crash and break and flinging Black Lance away. Black Lance then battled Leanbow as the Centaurus Wolf Megazord, during this time Necrolai planted Sculpin's fish scale on one of the wolf figureheads on his right shoulder. Leanbow then overpowered Black Lance and used a teleportation spell to drag Black Lance down into the Underworld, where the Knight-like terror vowed that he would get his revenge on Leanbow.

In "Light Source," he expressed concern about Hekatoid being sent to fight since he was out of shape.

In the finale, Black Lance assisted Sculpin in destroying Itassis for her betrayal. Then with a new chariot, Black Lance began attacking the surface world and soon began fighting the Manticore Megazord overwhelming it again. He appeared on the verge of victory before Nick, backed up with Fire Heart to form the Red Dragon Fire Ranger, beat him back, and the Rangers soon used their version of the Mystic Spell Seal to finish off Black Lance for good.

Black Lance was voiced by Derek Judge.

==== Sculpin ====
Lord Sculpin is the red fish man-like leader of the Ten Terrors with a trident for a weapon. His appearance is similar to both the Gill-man and Dagon and he has a fish for a head. Being the leader, Sculpin is most likely the most powerful of all the Terrors, his trident is an efficient weapon, able to strike down Magma, Matoombo and Itassis with it easily and can summon a flurry of fireballs from his trident when fighting. He also has the ability to shed his fish scales and use them as tracking devices. He is fanatically loyal to the Master, and doesn't even view it as his place to question orders.

When Magma failed to destroy the Rangers before the flame he lit burnt out, Sculpin hurled his trident through the portal created by the Stone of Judgment and destroyed Magma. He is extremely zealous about upholding the Rules of Darkness and has made it clear he will destroy anyone who breaks them, although this only because he thought following them would allow the Master to return. When he noticed that the Master showed no signs of returning, he became suspicious and went to investigate. He scried using the Lake of Lament to find out what happened to the Master. He realized that Leanbow was preventing the Master from being resurrected. Although this was a major hindrance to the Terrors' plans, Sculpin happily found the aspect "fun". He then plotted ways to lure Leanbow out in the open. He went back to the Lake of Lement and called Leanbow and showed him Megahorn's rampage and how strong he was against the Rangers. When Leanbow refused to help, Sculpin resorted to drastic measures. He deliberately broke the Rules of Darkness by sending Black Lance to the surface in order to assist Megahorn, feeling that two Terrors were far more difficult to handle than one. This strategy proved successful when Leanbow did appear on the Surface World. It was then that Sculpin gave Necrolai one of his fish scales to plant on Leanbow when he was battling Black Lance as the Centaurus Wolf Megazord. After Black Lance was sent back to the Underworld and Megahorn was destroyed, he expressed that Megahorn was a "Hot-head that deserved to lose," then proceeded with his next plan to find Leanbow.

In "Light Source," Sculpin gave Necrolai another one of his fish scales for her (and them) to use to track down Leanbow. When she found him, he brought along Gekkor and Matoombo with him to personally battle Leanbow. He first allowed Gekkor to fight the knight but when Gekkor was weakened, he order Gekkor to stop fighting and then sent Matoombo to take his place. After Matoombo shattered Leanbow's shield, this left him open for Sculpin to use his trident to extract the Master's spirit from Leanbow's body. Once Leanbow was "exorcised", Sculpin used his trident to create a fissure in the ground and send Leanbow plummeting into it.

In "The Return," Sculpin's immediate goal of restoring the Master was realized after he personally slew his Master's chosen vessel, Matoombo, thus restoring the Master to a physical form.

In the finale, Sculpin and Black Lance destroyed Itassis for her disloyalty. Alongside Black Lance, he fought the Rangers viciously, kidnapping Udonna and temporarily killing Jenji. In the Underworld however, he was confronted by Itassis (who was brought back to life by Necrolai). The two fought but Sculpin was ultimately killed unable to stand against her new sense of courage. In his last breath, Sculpin vowed that the Master would avenge him and that the forces of darkness would be victorious.

Sculpin was voiced by Peter Daube.

=== Hidiacs ===
The Hidiacs are one set of vicious zombie-like foot soldiers used by the Forces of Darkness. There is a ton of them that surround the center of the lair, in rows starting from the hole on the Earth's ground all the way down to the lair.

==== Styxoids ====
The Styxoids are more powerful versions of the Hidiacs used by the Forces of Darkness. They are more muscular and wear leather masks and vests and wield spears. They also possess the ability to speak and are sometimes used to command squads of Hidiacs and monsters.

The ones that spoke were voiced by Nick Kemplen and Jim McLarty.

=== Monsters ===
These are the monsters used by minions of Octomus. To make a monster grow, the "Uthra Major, Rise Up" incantation must be said which then causes the monster to grow to giant size.

- Troll #1 – A troll monster. This monster was destroyed by the White Mystic Ranger.
- Mucor (voiced by John Callen) – A slime monster. This monster was destroyed by the Mystic Titans.
- Hydra Worm – An eight-headed worm monster that was responsible for digging the Underworld Pit. This monster was destroyed by the Mystic Dragon.
- Clawbster (voiced by Bruce Hopkins) – A cockatrice monster that can turn anyone to stone, and makes rock puns. This monster was destroyed by the Titan Megazord.
- Troll #2 – A second troll monster was used by Koragg. He used the stolen Titan Megazord powers to upgrade the Troll Monster into a Rock Troll. This monster was destroyed by the Centaurus Phoenix Megazord.
- Taxi Cab Monster (voiced by Derek Judge) – A mimic monster that can take the form of a taxicab. This monster was destroyed by the Titan Megazord.
- Flytrap (voiced by Ross Girven) – A Venus Flytrap/leech monster. He disguised himself as DJ Fly (portrayed by Otis Frizzell) and turned his listeners into vampires that would obey Necrolai's every command. This monster was destroyed by the Titan Megazord.
- Boney – A ghoulish hyena monster that was waiting for Xander and Vida when they opened the wrong door when trying to obtain the Fire Heart. This monster was destroyed by Xandar and Vida.
- Skullington (voiced by Campbell Cooley) – A skeleton monster. He could fire bone projectiles and could reform his body. He was sent by Koragg on Necrolai's begging to retrieve the Fire Heart. This monster was destroyed by the Green Mystic Ranger.
- Gargoyle of the Gates – A gargoyle monster that guarded the Gates of the Underworld. This monster was destroyed by the Mystic Dragon.
- Jester (voiced by Gred Ward) – A gremlin monster that is dressed as a jester. He can detach his hand and can wield either a war hammer or a pair of scissors. This monster was destroyed by Solaris Knight.
- Behemoth (voiced by Patrick Kake) – A behemoth monster. He used a hammer and spikes to cause earthquakes. This monster was destroyed by the Solar Streak Megazord.
- Gnatu (voiced by Callie Blood) – A succubus monster that fights with a sword and can create green flames. She was sent with Spydex to steal the lifeforces of people. This monster was destroyed by the Titan Megazord.
- Spydex (voiced by Millen Baird) – A spider monster that shoots spikes and webs. He was Gnatu's silent partner who held onto the stolen lifeforce. Gnatu used Spydex as a shield for one of the Rangers' attacks which destroyed Spydex.
- Screamer (voiced by Lori Dungey) – A harpy monster with wings on her head and a beak on her forehead. She could "featherize" people with her scream, turning them into piles of feathers. This monster was destroyed by the Titan Megazord and the Solar Streak Megazord.
- Barbarian Beasts – The Barbarian Beasts are four monsters that were summoned from the Oblivion by Imperious.
  - Warmax (voiced by Mark Wright) – A samurai monster who is one of the four Barbarian Beasts. Koragg did not get along with him that well. This monster was destroyed by the Mystic Titans and Solar Streak Megazord.
  - Shrieker (voiced by Susan Brady) – A siren monster who is one of the four Barbarian Beasts. This monster was destroyed by the Mystic Rangers.
  - 50 Below (voiced by Paul Minifie) – An ice-elemental, hockey mask-wearing yeti monster who is one of the four Barbarian Beasts. This monster was destroyed by the Mystic Rangers' Legend Mode.
  - Fightoe (voiced by Jason Hoyte) – A staff-wielding kobold monster who is one of the four Barbarian Beasts. Imperious later destroyed Fightoe for his failure and used his life-force to power Ursus.
- Ursus – A machine golem monster. Imperious used Fightoe's life-force energy to power it. This monster was destroyed by the Manticore Megazord.
- Chimera (voiced by Adam Gardiner, Lauren Jackson, and Oscar Burt-Shearer) – A Chimera monster created by Imperious by using a forbidden spell to combine the energies of the Solar Streak Megazord with the spirits of the monsters Leanbow vanquished. It consists of its vampire-like face with long curled purple horns, a female chameleon-like face, and a bull-like face, a vampire bat-like face on top of his normal head, a lobster's face for a neck and lower jaw, two eyes on its neck with three spikes on either side, a lion-like face on its chest, a snake-like face on its back, a European dragon head with two gun barrels in its mouth for a right hand, the left arm of the Troll with claws on its fingers, and the slimmed down legs and feet of Clawbster minus the third toe on each foot. This monster was destroyed by the Phoenix Unizord.
