= Patrick Kake =

New Zealand actor

Patrick Paul Kake (Māori pronunciation: [ˌkaˈke], anglicized as /ˌkɑːˈkeɪ/ kah-KAY) is a New Zealand actor. He is best known for his role as Oreius the centaur in The Chronicles of Narnia: The Lion, the Witch and the Wardrobe. He also appeared as the character Mauser for 23 of the 28 episodes of the TV series Cleopatra 2525, and was the voice of Scaletex in Power Rangers: Operation Overdrive. He also portrayed the character of Frank Robbins in the film 30 Days of Night, with Josh Hartnett, and has been in six episodes of Hercules: The Legendary Journeys as the roles of Hercules double, Hercules, Sovereign double and Lynk.

== Filmography ==
- Cleopatra 2525 (2000–2001, TV series) - Mauser
- Skin & Bone (2003) - Sean (Red Captain)
- The Chronicles of Narnia: The Lion, the Witch and the Wardrobe (2005) - Oreius (voice)
- In Her Line of Fire (2006) - Hammer
- Power Rangers: Operation Overdrive (2007, TV series) - Skoltox (voice)
- 30 Days of Night (2007) - Frank Robbins
