= James Gaylyn =

New Zealand actor (born 1954)

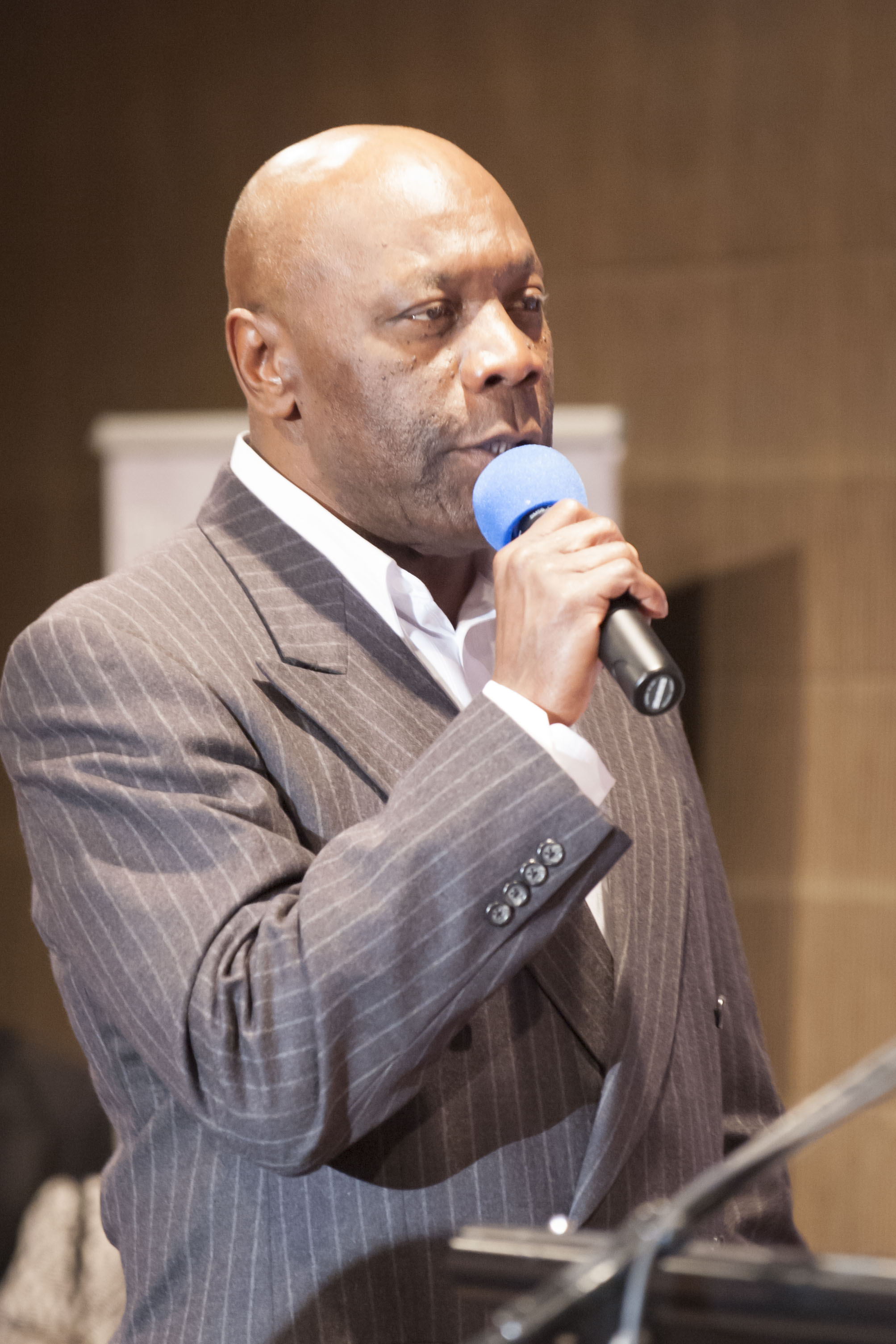
- Gaylyn at the U.S. Independence Day Event in Auckland, July 3, 2014.
- Born: January 9, 1954 (age 72); Louisville, Kentucky, U.S.
- Occupation: Actor
- Years active: 1998–present
- Notable work: Zeltrax in Power Rangers Dino Thunder (voice); Colonel Mason Truman in Power Rangers RPM

James Gaylyn (born January 9, 1954) is an American actor and musician based in New Zealand. He is best known for his appearances in the Power Rangers franchise, which was an American adaptation of Super Sentai.

== Early life ==
Gaylyn moved to New Zealand with his New Zealand-born wife in 1981. As a blues singer and drummer, he has released albums in and toured New Zealand and Australia. He also played drums on the OMC track "How Bizarre," which became an international hit.

== Career ==
Gaylyn is best known internationally for his work on Power Rangers. He starred as Col. Mason Truman in Power Rangers RPM and has had a number of onscreen and voice-over roles since the show's production relocated to Auckland. His career has also included other international productions, including Avatar and the Netflix series Cowboy Bebop.

== Personal life ==
Gaylyn lives on the North Shore of Auckland. His son, Elijah, is an aspiring rapper.

== Filmography ==
=== Voice-over ===
- Power Rangers Dino Thunder (2004) .... Zeltrax / Golden Rod
- Power Rangers S.P.D. (2005) .... Orange-Head Krybots / General Benaag / Zeltrax
- Power Rangers Operation Overdrive (2007) .... Volcon / Cheetar
- Power Rangers Super Megaforce (2014) .... General Peluso

=== Television ===
- Xena: Warrior Princess (2000) .... Petracles
- Atomic Twister (2002, TV Movie) .... Dr. Martin Jennings
- You Wish! (2003, TV Movie) .... Mayor
- Power Rangers Ninja Storm (2003, "The Samurai's Journey Part II") .... Past Wind Ninja Academy Sensei
- Eddie's Million Dollar Cook-Off (2003, TV Movie) .... Longo
- Power Rangers S.P.D. (2005) .... Store Manager
- Legend of the Seeker (2009) .... Commander Trimack
- Power Rangers RPM (2009) .... Colonel Mason Truman
- The Pacific (2010) .... Tee
- Power Rangers Dino Super Charge (2016) .... Mr. Watkins
- Power Rangers Beast Morphers (2020) .... Colonel Mason Truman

=== Film ===
- The World's Fastest Indian (2005) .... Customs Official
- In Her Line of Fire (2006) .... Admiral Winters
- Treasure Island Kids: The Battle of Treasure Island (2006) .... Morgan
- Wendy Wu: Homecoming Warrior (2006, TV Movie) .... Mr. Medina
- Bridge to Terabithia (2007) .... Principal Turner
- Avatar (2009) .... Op Center Staff
- Mr. Pip (2012) .... Magwitch
- The Royal Treatment .... Nate
- X (2022) .... Sheriff Dentler
- Heart Eyes (2025) .... Chief Richard Hartley
- M3GAN 2.0 (2025) .... General Hurst
