= David Weatherley (actor) =

British-New Zealand actor (1939–2024)

- Born: David John Weatherley; 1 March 1939; London, England
- Died: 12 December 2024 (aged 85); Auckland, New Zealand
- Occupations: Actor; voice artist
- Years active: 1963–2024

David John Weatherley (1 March 1939 – 12 December 2024) was an English-born New Zealand actor and voice artist known for his role as Barliman Butterbur in The Lord of the Rings: The Fellowship of the Ring.

== Life and career ==
Weatherley was born in London on 1 March 1939. He moved to Canada in 1956 for a military career, serving five years in the Canadian Army. Weatherley eventually moved to New Zealand in the early 1960s to engage in a theatre acting career, where he was best known for his long association with the Mercury Theatre, Auckland. He worked in all major genres including radio drama, theatre, television and film. He was perhaps best known outside New Zealand for his series regular role as Spencer in Power Rangers Operation Overdrive, which was filmed in New Zealand.

He played Mephistopheles/The Persian in the 1993 New Zealand tour of Ken Hill's Phantom of the Opera.

In 2016, he was presented with a Scroll of Honour from the Variety Artists Club of New Zealand for his services to the entertainment industry.

Weatherley died in Auckland on 12 December 2024, at the age of 85. Inkeeping with his wishes, his ashes were buried underneath the stage of Auckland's Mercury Theatre.

== Filmography ==
Year	Title	Role	Notes
1976	A Great Day	Ken	
1976	The Park Terrace Murder	Inspector Pender	
1984	Other Halves	Judge	
1984	Second Time Lucky	British Officer	
1984	Death Warmed Up	Professor Tucker	
1985	Counter Measures	Karl Heyden	
1989	Beyond Gravity	Planetarium voice	
1992	Grampire	Sargent Dicky Ticker	
1992	The Girl Who Came Late	Lex Rubins	
2001	The Lord of the Rings: The Fellowship of the Ring	Barliman Butterbur	
2007	Power Rangers Operation Overdrive	Spencer, Benglo	TV series
2009	Under the Mountain	Desk Sergeant	
