= Power Rangers Operation Overdrive =

American television series

- Genre: Action-adventure; Comedy; Science fantasy; Superhero
- Based on: GoGo Sentai Boukenger by Toei Company
- Developed by: Jetix; The Walt Disney Company; Toei Company; abc kids
- Showrunner: Bruce Kalish
- Written by: Bruce Kalish; Jackie Marchand; John Tellegen; David Garber
- Directed by: Mark Beesley; Britta Johnstone; Jonathan Brough; Mike Smith; Charlie Haskell; Vanessa Alexander
- Starring: See "Cast"
- Theme music composer: Transcenders; Herman van Doorn
- Composers: Leigh Roberts; Ry Welch; Gad Emile Zeitune; Wayne Jones; Rhett Nelson
- Countries of origin: United States; Japan
- Original language: English
- No. of episodes: 32

Production
- Executive producers: Bruce Kalish; Koichi Sakamoto
- Producers: Janine Dickins; Charles Knight
- Production locations: New Zealand (Auckland Region) (Auckland); Japan (Greater Tokyo Area) (Tokyo, Saitama, Yokohama) and Kyoto)
- Cinematography: Simon Riera
- Camera setup: Single-camera
- Running time: 22 minutes
- Production companies: BVS Entertainment; Renaissance Atlantic Entertainment; Toei Company; Ranger Productions, Ltd.

Original release
- Network: Toon Disney (Jetix)
- Release: February 26 – November 12, 2007

Related
- Power Rangers television series

Power Rangers Operation Overdrive is a television series and the fourteenth entry of the Power Rangers franchise. The season uses footage and other material from the 30th Super Sentai series GoGo Sentai Boukenger, which celebrates the thirtieth anniversary of that franchise. In addition, this season's team-up episode, "Once a Ranger", commemorates the fifteenth anniversary of the Power Rangers franchise. The season premiered on February 26, 2007, on Toon Disney's Jetix programming block. It was the first season to use 16:9 Super 35 and Super 16 mm film widescreen footage from the Super Sentai franchise, although this footage was scaled down & cropped to 4:3 aspect ratio until Samurai.

Unique among Power Ranger series, Operation Overdrive has the Rangers exploring, operating and fighting in many different countries around the world, rather than focusing only on their home city of San Angeles.

== Pre-production ==
The early working title for the series was Power Rangers Drive Force, but was later changed to "Relic Hunters" and then "Operation Overdrive"

In early pre-production, on July 26, 2006, the series' logo was posted on a fan message board called "Fuñaroboard." This same logo was later featured on the Disney website, RangerSecrets.com, as part of the preview for the series. The logo is very similar to that of the parent series Boukenger in the basic design and format.

On November 14, 2006, Disney had set up its official website for Power Rangers Operation Overdrive.

== Synopsis ==
Five brave, skilled, and adventurous individuals – Mack Hartford, Will Aston, Dax Lo, Ronny Robinson, and Rose Ortiz – are chosen and genetically enhanced by billionaire adventurer and Mack's father Andrew Hartford to become Power Rangers and travel the globe to find five magical jewels that were taken from a powerful artifact called the Corona Aurora before two villainous brothers, Flurious and Moltor, can. Along the way, the Rangers encounter two additional villainous factions: Kamdor and the Fearcats. The Rangers are later joined by an alien named Tyzonn.

== Cast and characters ==
Overdrive Rangers

- James Maclurcan as Mackenzie "Mack" Hartford; The Red Overdrive Ranger.
- Samuell Benta as William "Will" Aston; The Black Overdrive Ranger.
- Gareth Yuen as Dax Lo; The Blue Overdrive Ranger.
- Caitlin Murphy as Veronica "Ronny" Robinson; The Yellow Overdrive Ranger.
- Rhoda Montemayor as Rose Ortiz; The Pink Overdrive Ranger.
- Dwayne Cameron as Tyzonn; The Mercury Ranger.

Supporting characters

- Rod Lousich as Andrew Hartford, the Rangers' mentor and Mack's father.
- David Weatherley as Spencer, Andrew Hartford's butler.
- Campbell Cooley as the voice of Alpha 6.
- Nic Sampson as the voice of the Sentinel Knight.
- Beth Allen as Vella.

Villains

- Gerald Urquhart as Flurious.
- Mark Ferguson as the voice of Moltor.
- Ria Vandervis as Miratrix.
- Adam Gardiner as the voice of Kamdor.
- James Gaylyn as the voice of Cheetar.
- Lori Dungey as the voice of Crazar.
- David Weatherley as the voice of Benglo.
- Kelson Henderson as Norg and the voice of Mig.
- Glen Levy as the voice of Thrax.

Guest stars

- Johnny Yong Bosch as Adam Park; the new Black Ranger, and previously the Black Ninja Ranger, Green Zeo Ranger and the original Green Turbo Ranger.
- Sally Martin as Tori Hanson; the Blue Wind Ranger.
- Emma Lahana as Kira Ford; the Yellow Dino Thunder Ranger.
- Matt Austin as Bridge Carson; the third S.P.D. Red Ranger, following a promotion at S.P.D.
- Richard Brancatisano as Xander Bly; the Green Mystic Force Ranger.

== Episodes ==
No.	Title	Directed by	Written by	Original release date
1	"Kick Into Overdrive"	Mark Beesley	Bruce Kalish	February 26, 2007
2	"Kick Into Overdrive"	Mark Beesley	Jackie Marchand	February 26, 2007
Part 1: Explorer Andrew Hartford finds the Corona Aurora, a mighty crown that could be used for good or evil when reunited with its five missing jewels. However, he inadvertently awakens Moltor and Flurious, who also seek the crown's jewels. Hartford recruits four talented but unwilling citizens to become Power Rangers, and he plans to become the Red Ranger. However, when the evil forces attack, it is soon left to Andrew's son, Mack, to take action. Part 2: Mack wishes to continue as the Red Ranger; however, Mr. Hartford doesn't want his son to get involved, and confiscates the morpher. However, the situation worsens when Moltor steals the crown and kidnaps Mr Hartford, forcing Mack to lead a rescue attempt.
3	"The Underwater World"	Mark Beesley	John Tellegen	March 5, 2007
The search for the first Corona Aurora jewel begins when Andrew discovers Atlantis. Believing the first jewel to be hidden there, the Rangers travel to the undersea continent. However, problems arise when Will refuses to cooperate with the team. In the end, Will learns the importance of teamwork to help his team find an Atlantean scroll.
4	"Heart of Blue"	Britta Johnstone	David Garber	March 12, 2007
With the scroll from Atlantis, the Rangers need to find the other two to continue with the jewel quest. Meanwhile, Dax falls in love with a girl named Mira, but seeing her becomes far worse when it is revealed that she is Miratrix, another villain seeking the jewels.
5	"Weather or Not"	Britta Johnstone	John Tellegen	March 19, 2007
As the Rangers prepare to head to St. Lucia to search for the first jewel, Moltor steals a weather machine and prepares to destroy Earth. Meanwhile, Mack questions his status as the Red Ranger when he puts a bystander in jeopardy. When the Weather Machine in its monster form defeats the Zords and traps the other Rangers in a chasm, Mack must put his doubts aside to pilot the newest, overpowerful zord, the Drill Driver.
6	"Pirate in Pink"	Britta Johnstone	Jackie Marchand	March 26, 2007
The Rangers begin the final leg of the first jewel quest on St. Lucia; however, while the other Rangers worry about running into the Ghost of Brownbeard the Pirate, Rose refuses to believe in the supernatural spirit. However, the Ghost of Brownbeard does turn up searching for the jewel, and Rose finds herself forced to trust him while trying to keep it away from Miratrix.
7	"At All Costs"	Jonathan Brough	Bruce Kalish	April 2, 2007
With Brownbeard's pearl safely in the Rangers' hands, the gang have some time off. However, their fun is made sour due to Ronny's overcompetitive nature. Meanwhile, Moltor holds a battle royale for his Lava Lizards to see which one is left standing. The victor of that battle royale is transformed into Volkan as he attempts to get a Dragon Scale to make him more powerful while the Rangers try to find the same scale that will allow them to wield the new Defender Vest and the overpowerful Drill Blaster.
8	"Both Sides Now"	Jonathan Brough	David Garber	April 9, 2007
The gang's search for the Hou-ou bird leads to a dead end; however, they have more important things to worry about when Will is suddenly "fired" by Andrew and "sides" with Miratrix. While the other Rangers scramble to find him, Will assists Miratrix in releasing her Ninja Master Kamdor.
9	"Follow The Ranger"	Jonathan Brough	John Tellegen	April 30, 2007
Mack misinterprets Andrew's concern over his status as a Ranger as a lack of confidence. Meanwhile, Moltor and Flurious team up to steal the DriveMax Megazord, capturing Mack in the process. While the other Rangers try to locate their leader and the Megazord, Mack finds that the key to his escape may be the rivalry between his two captors, with a little assistance from Norg. In the end, the brothers declare emancipation from each other upon being defeated by the new Super DriveMax Megazord combination.
10	"Lights, Camera, DAX"	Mike Smith	John Tellegen	May 7, 2007
Dax wants to try out for a movie role, but is opposed by Andrew, forcing him to decide between his lifelong dream and his Ranger responsibilities. Things get complicated when Dax is put under a spell by Kamdor and Miratrix, who are looking for the Toru Diamond using the parchment left behind by the Hou-ou Bird, but face interference by Moltor and his new monster, Scaletex.
11	"Face to Face"	Mike Smith	Jackie Marchand	May 14, 2007
12	"Face to Face"	Mike Smith	Jackie Marchand	May 21, 2007
Part 1: The Rangers try to translate the parchment that was recovered from Miratrix and Kamdor, but are ambushed by monsters sent by Moltor. Mack discovers that one of the monsters, an alien named Tyzonn, may not be evil and tries to figure out the truth behind his actions. Part 2: Mack and Tyzonn are ambushed by Bullox and a group of Lava Lizards as the other Rangers try to find Mack and claim the next jewel of the crown. Once that was done and Bullowasis destroyed, the Rangers used the jewels to restore Tyzonn to his true form at the advice of the Sentinel Knight.
13	"Man of Mercury"	Charlie Haskell	John Tellegen	June 4, 2007
14	"Man of Mercury"	Charlie Haskell	John Tellegen	June 4, 2007
Part 1: When an expedition camp in Brazil finds the first clue towards finding the third jewel of the Corona Aurora, they are attacked by new villains known as the Fearcats; Mig and Benglo. The Rangers attempt to stop them, only to find their paths crossing with Tyzonn again. Part 2: Flurious tests his gyros on the Fearcats, turning them into powerful cyborgs. It is a race against time for the Rangers to save Tyzonn and stop the Fearcats from destroying San Angeles. In the end, Tyzonn joins the team as the new Mercury Ranger.
15	"Behind the Scenes"	Charlie Haskell	Jackie Marchand	June 11, 2007
The Rangers are invited to perform an on-air interview for a popular talk show. Flurious, Kamdor, Miratrix, and the Fearcats join in an extremely shaky alliance, and while Kamdor and Miratrix target Tyzonn, the others start to hit the Rangers with several sequential attacks. With their Zords taken out by Flurious's robot, the Rangers must rely on Tyzonn and his new Flashpoint Megazord to save the day.
16	"Just Like Me"	Charlie Haskell	David Garber	June 18, 2007
The Rangers travel to Norway and race Moltor to the mystical hammer Mjolnir. Moltor retrieves it first, and the adventure is compounded by Tyzonn's sudden desire to emulate Will, much to Will's annoyance. Tyzonn learns the benefit of being himself as they attempt to take Mjolnir back.
17	"It's Hammer Time"	Vanessa Alexander	John Tellegen	July 2, 2007
Tracing the connection between the Cannon of Ki Amuk and Mjolnir, the Rangers travel to Mexico and are ambushed. In the process, Loki appears, masquerading as Thor, and steals Mjolnir. To get it back, Spencer disguises himself as the Goddess Freyja even when the real Thor shows up to expose Loki's trickery. After the Rangers use the Cannon of Ki Amuk and Mjolnir to get the Piedra Aztec del Compás, it gets stolen by Moltor.
18	"Out of Luck"	Vanessa Alexander	David Garber	July 9, 2007
After successfully getting the Piedra Aztec del Compás, Moltor sends Blothgaar to fight the Rangers. Mack is blasted by the Piedra Aztec del Compás and is overcome by a serious case of bad luck. The rangers give him their good luck charms.
19	"One Gets Away"	Vanessa Alexander	Bruce Kalish	July 16, 2007
Using the Piedra Aztec del Compás, the Rangers finally find the Blue Sapphire, the Corona Aurora's third jewel. Will is entrusted to get it back to the base, but loses it in an ambush by Kamdor and Miratrix. With Andrew angry with him, Will resigns only to have Spencer offer him another chance. Meanwhile, Moltor offers the Fearcats some invincible Super Armor.
20	"Once a Ranger"	Britta Johnstone	Jackie Marchand	July 23, 2007
21	"Once a Ranger"	Britta Johnstone	Jackie Marchand	July 23, 2007
Part 1: Lord Zedd and Rita Repulsa's son, Thrax, unites all four Corona Aurora-seeking villain factions into a new Evil Alliance. When they overwhelm the Overdrive Rangers, their connection to the Morphin Grid is severed, leaving the team unable to morph. With the gems still needing protecting, Sentinel Knight assembles a team of replacement Rangers, made up of previous (or future) teams of Power Rangers. Part 2: No longer having Ranger powers, as well as feeling left out due to the presence of their replacements, the Overdrive Rangers (minus Mack) return to their civilian lives. When Mack learns of Thrax's plans to destroy the Sentinel Knight, he reunites the team to seek out the only item capable of doing so; the legendary sword Excelsior. Meanwhile, the team of returning Rangers head to Angel Grove to seek out the only being capable of repairing the Morphin Grid; Alpha 6. Guest Starring: Johnny Yong Bosch, Sally Martin, Emma Lahana, Matt Austin and Richard Brancatisano.
22	"One Fine Day"	Britta Johnstone	Bruce Kalish	August 6, 2007
The Rangers get a day off and plan a relaxing picnic in the forest. Unfortunately for Rose, Tyzonn is obsessed with getting to know her better, which goes from flattery to annoyance very quickly. The Fearcats happen to be in the same forest, and while searching for the powerful Centurion Torch to use in their latest Giant Robot, they put up a Lamporean force field. Our heroes bump into it, and despite Tyzonn claiming that forming a human chain with his Mercurian powers will allow them passage, they end up separated, with Rose stuck inside the force field with Tyzonn.
23	"Ronny on Empty"	Mike Smith	John Tellegen	August 20, 2007
24	"Ronny on Empty"	Mike Smith	John Tellegen	August 27, 2007
Part 1: Ronny is captured by the Fearcats while Will disobeys orders not to go after her. Meanwhile, a clue from the Centurion Torch leads the other Rangers to Egypt. Part 2: Will saves Ronny from having her energy drained, and the Rangers battle Moltor's new robot with their new Battlefleet Megazord.
25	"Things Not Said"	Mike Smith	David Garber	September 10, 2007
The Rangers battle one of Kamdor's monsters that gives their system a virus, which suddenly affects Mack. Later, Mack is revealed to be an android made by Andrew. Mack then becomes enraged at his "father", and loses his will to fight. After encouragement from Spencer, Mack leaves to help his team, but takes with him the Sentinel Sword Rose was developing that would destroy a human due to being considered robot technology. He arrives at the fight and activates the Sentinel Sword, becoming the Red Sentinel Ranger and defeating all of Kamdor's monsters. Kamdor flees with the Star of Isis, but Ronny uses her super-speed to steal the jewel back at the last second.
26	"Red Ranger Unplugged"	Jonathan Brough	John Tellegen	October 1, 2007
Mack tries to find a new identity for himself and takes up the guitar. The Rangers battle a new Fearcat named Crazar while Mig and Benglo look for the Octavian Chalice.
27	"Home and Away"	Jonathan Brough	Jackie Marchand	October 8, 2007
28	"Home and Away"	Jonathan Brough	Jackie Marchand	October 15, 2007
Part 1: Mig and Benglo access the Octavian Chalice's power and mix the different ingredients needed to create Agrios, who severely damages the Megazords in battle. Meanwhile, after a battle with Kamdor and Miratrix, Tyzonn is knocked unconscious and awakens on his home planet with his fiancé, Vella. Part 2: Tyzonn begins to have doubts regarding his reunion with Vella when he finds that she is actually Crazar in disguise. Meanwhile, Mack attacks the Fearcats in the Flashpoint Megazord, willing to sacrifice it and himself to stop Agrios. The Rangers eventually defeat Agrios and the Fearcats try to escape with the Octavian Chalice, but the Rangers show up ready to finish the battle.
29	"Way Back When"	Jonathan Brough	John Tellegen	October 22, 2007
The Rangers view Mack's memories on a video screen to remind themselves of the status of each jewel, to figure out who has them, and to try to figure out where to begin their search for the final jewel. They first view the four earlier jewels' locations, which proves fruitless, but thanks to Spencer's help, they eventually reveal the next location: Greece.
30	"Two Fallen Foes"	Mark Beesley	John Tellegen	October 29, 2007
The Rangers travel to Greece, where they invoke an ancient ritual to find the next jewel. Kamdor, angry that Miratrix failed him again, berates her. Miratrix, seeking more power, intercepts the ritual and becomes a giant owl-like creature. After being defeated by the Battlefleet Megazord, Kamdor then imprisons her inside the crystal where he was imprisoned. He now makes his final act: summoning a meteor with the power of the Blue Sapphire and challenges the Rangers. At the same time, the rest battle and destroy the meteor, and—in the end—Will battles and defeats Kamdor. They then travel to Egypt and now need a key to open the Sarcophagus with Moltor on the trail.
31	"Nothing to Lose"	Mark Beesley	Jackie Marchand	November 5, 2007
With the Blue Sapphire now in his possession, Flurious uses its power to start destroying Moltor's volcano. Meanwhile, the Rangers head to Japan to find the Tri-Dragon key needed to open the Tomb, which they hope contains the next jewel. Having decided he is the most expendable member of the team due to his android nature, Mack starts to place himself in more dangerous situations, which comes to a head when he decides to go to Moltor's volcano to retrieve the crown. Although he is unsuccessful, Moltor is severely weakened and travels to Flurious's ice lair with the crown. However, with both the crown and one of the jewels in his possession, Flurious quickly disposes of his brother and plans to take care of the Rangers next. Meanwhile, the Rangers learn that the Corona's fifth jewel may have been far closer than they could ever have imagined.
32	"Crown and Punishment"	Mark Beesley	Bruce Kalish	November 12, 2007
The Rangers retrieve the fifth jewel from the sarcophagus in Andrew Hartford's mansion. However, they're immediately ambushed by Flurious, who manages to take the four jewels that the Rangers possess. Now with all five jewels and the crown, Flurious reassembles the Corona Aurora and unleashes his wrath upon the world. But Flurious makes a big mistake by not destroying Mack earlier when he had the chance, leading to his destruction and Mack's own demise. Later, the Corona Aurora is placed on Mack's head after his death, which turns him human with all his memories intact. The Rangers later go their own separate ways, grateful that the world is saved but also having grown as humans on their quest. Note: This episode aired in the United Kingdom on November 11, 2007, before the United States' broadcast.
