= List of Power Rangers Megaforce characters =

The fictional characters of Power Rangers Megaforce include the Power Rangers, their enemies, and their friends and allies in the battle.

== Megaforce Power Rangers ==
The Megaforce Power Rangers are the eponymous protagonists of the series. They are five teenagers with attitude chosen by Gosei to save the Earth from the Warstar. They live in the fictional city of Harwood County. To transform into the Megaforce Rangers, they use the Gosei Morphers by calling out "It's Morphin' Time! Go Go Megaforce!". They are constantly training to keep up with the growing strength of their enemies. They wield the Power Cards (Note: Each of the Power Cards written as Goseiger without edit.) in battle, which they use to perform certain attacks and to summon their personal weapons which merge to form the Megaforce Blaster. Each Ranger carries a Mega Blaster as a side arm that they use for special attacks. While in Ultra Mode, they each bear a lightweight, waistcoat-like shield and wield an Ultra Sword powered by an Ultra Zord. They are later joined by the mechanical Robo Knight when the Toxic Mutants emerge to pollute the Earth and by the human-like alien Orion during the second season Power Rangers Super Megaforce. Also, Gosei gives them the Legendary Morphers, which they use to access the more powerful Super Mega Mode and Legendary Ranger Mode to morph into any of the previous 19 teams of Power Rangers. (Note: The other Legendary Keys they used such as Dynaman, Changeman, Flashman, Maskman and Fiveman which they never adapted as Power Rangers before.) In Super Mega Mode they wield their Super Mega Blasters and Super Mega Sabers. By occasionally switching their weapons with each other they can double their blasting and sword powers.

=== Troy Burrows ===
Troy Burrows is the Megaforce Red Ranger and leader of the Mega Rangers. He is new in town and a loner to start with, but he quickly gains friends when he is recruited to lead Megaforce. He is very skilled in martial arts. He had a tough upbringing that made him responsible and focused, making Troy leader material in the opinion of Gosei, which when combined with his compassion, loyalty, and support of the underdog, makes him the perfect role model for a Ranger. Troy also has dreams involving his team's predecessors fighting an unknown evil, a premonition that eventually comes true, in the finale of Power Rangers Super Megaforce. He is the most skillful of the Rangers and holds an unbreakable fighting spirit and complete belief in humankind's potential as a species to work together and beat the odds. He is also Emma's love interest which is often seen due to his strong bond and immense care towards Emma.

Troy wields the Dragon Sword in battle and pilots the Dragon MechaZord. He wields the elemental power of air.

When the Armada invades, Troy is given a Legendary Morpher by Gosei and the ability to morph into the Super Megaforce Red Ranger. When he gains his Super Megaforce Ranger Key, he pilots the Super Mega Skyship which also serves as the Megaforce Rangers' mode of transportation and the carrier of the other Zords. In Super Megaforce he gains the ability to morph into Legendary Red Rangers.

Troy is portrayed by Andrew Gray.

=== Emma Goodall ===
Emma Goodall is the Megaforce Pink Ranger. She is a BMX biker who loves nature and wants to protect the environment, taking the alien attack on Earth and the Toxic Mutants' campaign to pollute the Earth very personally. In the episode "Harmony and Dizchord", it is revealed that Emma has an excellent singing voice which she inherited from her late mother. She uses this to counteract Dizchord's attack. She is the most feeling and comprehensive of the Rangers and bears a strong connection to the natural world and is sensitive to the point of recognizing the potential of good in others, even if they are supposedly enemies. She wields the Phoenix Shot in battle and pilots the Phoenix MechaZord. She wields the elemental power of air and can summon the Sky Brothers, which may then be used for either the Sky Blast or the Ultimate Dino Blast. She is also Troy's love interest which is often implicated due to immense care of the pair towards each other.

When the Armada begins its invasion, Emma saves Ernie's BrainFreeze from the X Borgs before they can find Ernie. Upon gaining her Super Megaforce Key, Emma pilots the Super Mega Sub Zord. In "Spirit of the Tiger," the training Emma got from Casey Rhodes enabled her to channel the spirit of the Phoenix. In Super Megaforce she gains the ability to morph into Legendary Pink and White Rangers.

Emma is portrayed by Christina Masterson.

=== Jake Holling ===
Jake Holling is the Megaforce Black Ranger, and in the second season the Super Megaforce Green Ranger. He also has a crush on Gia. He is out-going, optimistic, fun-loving, and fearless, whether on the battlefield or in social situations. He wants very much to make his identity as the Black Megaforce Ranger public, but like the others is sworn to secrecy. Jake is Noah's best friend and the two are an unbeatable force when together, complementing each other's skills. His only weakness is his obsession with Gia. He is the toughest and physically strongest of the Rangers, though will show signs of higher intelligence occasionally.

Jake wields the Snake Axe in battle and pilots the Snake MechaZord. He wields the elemental power of earth and can call upon the Land Brothers whenever needed also shares the Land Brothers with Gia Moran.

During the Armada's invasion, Jake receives his Super Mega Mode key in green. He also pilots the Racer Zord in this form. In "Spirit of the Tiger", the training Jake gets from Casey Rhodes enables him to channel the spirit of the snake. In Super Megaforce, he gains the ability to morph into Legendary Green and Black Ranger.

Jake is portrayed by Azim Rizk.

=== Gia Moran ===
Gia Moran is the Megaforce Yellow Ranger and is labeled as "Miss Perfect". Gia is personable, skilled in martial arts, and as intelligent as she is confident. She and Emma have been best friends since they were very young, and this has not stopped despite now being in different social circles. This friendship is tested by Beezara's spell in the episode "United We Stand". Gia seems to be aware of Jake's feelings for her but does not reciprocate them. She is the most responsible and focused of the Rangers as well as being very fast and agile.

Gia wields the Tiger Claw in battle and pilots the Tiger MechaZord. She wields the elemental power of earth and has access to the Land Brothers if the situation calls for it, making them useful for the Ultimate Dino Blast.

When the Armada begins its invasion, Gia saves some civilians from the X Borgs. Upon gaining her Super Megaforce Key, Gia pilots the Super Mega Wheeler Zord. In Super Megaforce she gains the ability to morph into Legendary Yellow Rangers. Gia returns in Power Rangers Super Ninja Steel and also appears in Power Rangers: Legacy Wars – Street Fighter Showdown.

Gia is portrayed by Ciara Hanna.

=== Noah Carver ===
Noah Carver is the Megaforce Blue Ranger and a nerd who uses his intelligence rather than brute strength in battle. He is best friends with Jake and they are a perfect team together, complementing and balancing each other's brain and brawn. Noah is also interested in the supernatural and fields of strange and peculiar science such as cryptozoology and extraterrestrial life. He is usually also second-in-command of the team.

He wields the Shark Bowgun in battle and pilots the Shark MechaZord, controlling the elemental power of water and the willing invoke of the Sea Brothers, which may then be used to produce the Sea Blast. Even during battle, he is the most creative and cunning of the Rangers and usually deploys strategies of quick thinking when an opponent proves too much to take down by conventional means.

During the Armada's invasion, Noah stops the X Borgs from invading Harwood County High school while saving the students. After the Armada's first invasion, Noah finds Mr. Burley in his office where Noah helps to catch his artifacts. When he gains his Super Megaforce Key, Noah pilots the Super Mega Jet Zord. Noah also convinces Mr. Burley to continue teaching his class. Noah then researches the different Power Rangers teams and wonders if they can tap into their respective Zords. Noah later questions his worthiness after he was beaten in battle by Skatana and starts training to counter Skatana's Blade of Infinity attack. During the duel, Noah was able to use the swords of his teammates to counter Skatana's attacks and defeat him. In Super Megaforce he develops strong sword skills and the ability to morph into Legendary Blue Rangers.

Noah is portrayed by John Mark Loudermilk.

=== Orion ===
Orion is the Silver Super Megaforce Ranger who appears in the Super Megaforce season. He is from the planet Andresia, a planet not unlike Earth, where he used to work in a rock quarry as a miner. One day at work, he discovered a crystal container containing the Silver Ranger Key and a mysterious box that had the details of the Legendary Sixth Rangers. When the Armada arrived on Andresia, all of his friends and family were lost in the attacks. By using the Key and Morpher, he becomes the Silver Ranger, having to survive on his own by training hard. When the opportunity arose, he shot down and stole one of the few Armada ships that had been left to guard Andresia and traveled to Earth, having tracked the Armada there.

In "Vrak is Back" Pt. 1, Vrak captures Orion to drain his Silver Ranger powers, while at the same time siphoning away his lifeforce. Robo Knight eventually sacrifices himself by giving his remaining lifeforce to Orion.

He has the ability to morph into the Legendary Sixth Rangers. Orion later gains the ability to combine his Sixth Ranger Keys to assume a Super Mega Gold form, with all the powers of said Ranger Keys. Orion also pilots a new version of the Q-Rex where it has a drill vehicle form was summoned by the Quantum Ranger Key, a form based on MMPR's T-Rex Zord when activated by the Green Ranger key, and a form based on Dino Thunder's primary Megazord when activated by the White Dino Thunder Ranger key.

Orion is portrayed by Cameron Jebo.

=== Robo Knight ===
Robo Knight is a mysterious robotic knight who was created by Gosei centuries ago for the sole purpose of protecting the Earth's environment. He first briefly appears in Troy's dream of the Legendary Battle, and later makes his debut in the episode "Robo Knight". It is revealed that after being dormant for so long he has lost some of his memory, including the one where Gosei created him. When the Toxic Mutants emerge, Robo Knight aids the Rangers but then leaves. At first fighting without thinking about human sacrifices and leaving the saving to the Mega Rangers, their influence gradually changes him. Robo Knight then spends the rest of the first season trying to understand human nature. Robo Knight has the ability to turn into the Lion Zord which can combine with a dump truck to become the Lion MechaZord and joins with the Knight Brothers (consisting of the Sky Lion Zord and the Sea Lion Zord) to form the Gosei Grand Megazord.[1][25][45]

In the finale of Megaforce titled "End Game", Robo Knight sacrifices the bulk of his energy to restore the Rangers' Morphers. He disappears as the Armada's invasion begins; and Troy starts to look for Robo Knight's current whereabouts.[46] Robo Knight resurfaces in "Vrak Is Back, Part 1", where it is revealed that his body was found by Vrak. Vrak reprograms Robo Knight to serve him and orders him to steal the Sixth Ranger power from Orion and corrupt it.[21] In "Vrak Is Back, Part 2", a powerful blow from Troy brings Robo Knight back to senses. Robo Knight returns to Vrak's underwater lair to free Orion. There, he sacrifices himself to save the life of his fellow Sixth Ranger by giving him the last of his lifeforce. While seemingly perished in Vrak's lair, Robo Knight makes a brief return in the gathering of past Rangers in against the Armada's final wave of X-Borgs army.[47]

Robo Knight is voiced by Chris Auer in the TV series and by Richard Epcar in the video game adaption.

== Allies ==
=== Gosei ===
Gosei is a supernatural guardian, who was mentored by Zordon and was tasked to be Earth's guardian. Awakened by the threat of the Warstar, he summons five teenagers to become the Mega Rangers power card and words. He has taken the appearance of a tiki head, believing it would ease the Rangers into accepting his existence as it is something they are familiar with.[1] The Gosei Morphers are modelled after him and the Megazords in Power Rangers Megaforce are named after him. In Super Megaforce Troy tells Gosei to locate Robo Knight but he won't, Gosei give the rangers with their new Morphers and new Zords to banish the Armada from Earth.

Gosei is voiced by Geoff Dolan in the TV series and by Jamieson Price in the video game adaption.

=== Tensou ===
Tensou is Gosei's shy and clumsy robotic assistant who assists the Rangers by providing their arsenal as well as locating their enemies with an advanced radar system if they are on Earth. He can also speak Andresian.

Tensou is voiced by Estevez Gillespie.

=== Ernie ===
Ernie is the manager of the local juice bar "Ernie's BrainFreeze". He is frequently acquainted by the Rangers during their free time.

During the Armada's first invasion, Ernie takes refuge behind the counter of his juice bar when the X Borgs invade it. Ernie is saved by Emma.

Ernie is portrayed by Shailesh Prajapati.

=== Mr. Burley ===
Mr. Burley is the high school science teacher at Harwood County High School. He is also a believer in the paranormal and other unexplained events Noah shows plenty of interest in his work, he's a recurring character in season 1 and a minor character in season 2.

Following the Armada's first invasion, Noah finds Mr. Burley in his office trying to keep his artifacts from falling. Noah helps Mr. Burley with this and tells him that he should keep teaching. When Mr. Burley enters his class, he recaps his question on who would outlive some life on Earth and states that the humans would if they work together.

Mr. Burley is portrayed by Ian Harcourt.

=== Jordan ===
Jordan is a civilian who falsely claimed to be the Red Ranger, he only appears in the episode "Stranger Ranger".

=== Roy ===
Roy is a former bully at Harwood Country High School.

=== Barry ===
Barry is a former bully at Harwood Country High School

=== Howie ===
Howie is a student at the Harwood County High School. He appears to be 14 or 15 years old and once got bullied by Roy and Barry, because he's small but Troy helped him.

=== Mentor Ji ===
Mentor Ji is the Samurai Rangers' master, mentor, guardian, and trainer. He returns in Power Rangers Super Megaforce. Mentor Ji is portrayed by Rene Naufahu who previously voiced Emperor Gruumm from Power Rangers S.P.D..

== Legendary Rangers ==
The Legendary Rangers, also known as the Historic Rangers[1], is a term referring to a collusion of all the veteran Power Rangers that predate and include the Mega Rangers. They join together to fight the Armada.

The term Legendary Rangers was initially used in reference to the Rangers that predated the Mega Rangers. During the Legendary Battle however, said Rangers teamed up with the Mega Rangers and submitted themselves under their command. They are led by Tommy Oliver

=== Past Rangers ===
Troy has dreams where the current Power Rangers and Robo Knight are joined by the past Power Rangers in their fight against the X Borgs. As the Megaforce Rangers' fight with the Armada progresses, they end up meeting various other Power Rangers.

Following is a list of rangers who appeared unmorphed before the Legendary Battle:-

- Jayden Shiba (portrayed by Alex Heartman) – Jayden Shiba is the Red Samurai Ranger. He provides Troy, Noah, and Jake a disc (the Double Disc) that would help them defeat Matacore. He and Mentor Ji later watch the Super Megaforce Rangers in their Megazords fighting Matacore. He appeared with the other Power Rangers before the Megaforce Rangers to aid them in the final battle against the Armada.
- Casey Rhodes (portrayed by Jason Smith) – The Jungle Fury Red Ranger and Pai Zhua master. Besides teaching children his Kung Fu, Casey works as a part-time zookeeper at the local zoo. He trains Emma and Jake in fighting without using weapons to battle the magnetic powered Pacha Chamak. After the battle when the Rangers visit the zoo to thank Casey, they learn from a zookeeper that no one named Casey works at the zoo. Emma and Jake later see Casey in a gazebo before he disappears into thin air. He appeared with the other Power Rangers before the Megaforce Rangers to aid them in the final battle against the Armada.
- Tommy Oliver (portrayed by Jason David Frank) – The original Green Ranger. He appeared leading the other Power Rangers before the Megaforce Rangers to aid them in the final battle against the Armada.
- T.J. Johnson (portrayed by Selwyn Ward) – The Blue Space Ranger. He appeared with the other Power Rangers before the Megaforce Rangers to aid them in the final battle against the Armada.
- Cassie Chan (portrayed by Patricia Ja Lee) – The Pink Space Ranger. She appeared with the other Power Rangers before the Megaforce Rangers to aid them in the final battle against the Armada.
- Leo Corbett (portrayed by Danny Slavin) – The Red Galaxy Ranger. He appeared with the other Power Rangers before the Megaforce Rangers to aid them in the final battle against the Armada.
- Damon Henderson (portrayed by Reggie Rolle) – The Green Galaxy Ranger. He appeared with the other Power Rangers before the Megaforce Rangers to aid them in the final battle against the Armada. He is portrayed by Reggie Rolle.
- Karone (portrayed by Melody Perkins) – The second Pink Galaxy Ranger and the former Astronema. She appeared with the other Power Rangers before the Megaforce Rangers to aid them in the final battle against the Armada.
- Carter Grayson (portrayed by Sean Cw Johnson) – The Red Lightspeed Ranger. He appeared with the other Power Rangers before the Megaforce Rangers to aid them in the final battle against the Armada.
- Dana Mitchell (portrayed by Alison MacInnis) – The Pink Lightspeed Ranger. She appeared with the other Power Rangers before the Megaforce Rangers to aid them in the final battle against the Armada.
- Wesley Collins (portrayed by Jason Faunt) – The Red Time Force Ranger. He appeared with the other Power Rangers before the Megaforce Rangers to aid them in the final battle against the Armada.
- Mike (portrayed by Hector David Jr.) – The Green Samurai Ranger. He appeared with the other Power Rangers before the Megaforce Rangers to aid them in the final battle against the Armada.
- Emily (portrayed by Brittany Anne Pirtle) – The Yellow Samurai Ranger. She appeared with the other Power Rangers before the Megaforce Rangers to aid them in the final battle against the Armada.

== Warstar Empire ==
The Warstar Empire are the main antagonists in the Megaforce series and is depicted as the most widespread intergalactic force throughout the cosmos. It is ruled by classes of alien royalty and nobility.

=== Warstar ===
The Warstar are a large group of insectoid alien invaders. Their ship hovers over the Earth directly above Harwood County. They are an advance party meant to conquer the Earth in preparation for the Armada's arrival, but due to the Megaforce Rangers’ interference they are defeated and forced to ally with other enemy factions.

==== Admiral Malkor ====
Admiral Malkor is the Cecropia moth-themed Warstar leader, subordinate to Mavro's empire, who within the terms of an agreement between the two forces, is allowed to attempt to conquer Earth, in a very limited amount of time, therefore he sees every asset as useful in his Warstar advance force. During battle, Malkor wields an axe of his likeness and is capable of disintegration and energy firing as well as metamorphosize to power up. His signature moves are Planet Strike and Meteor Shower. The Warstar Admiral is intelligent and shows respect to his warriors and comrades. The Toxic Mutants and the Robots later indirectly ally with Admiral Malkor to aid the cause of the Insectoids through Vrak's behalf. After the defeat of the Toxic Mutants, Malkor goes into a cocoon to further increase his power. After re-emerging in the episode "The Human Condition", he finally faces the Rangers. After a lengthy battle, he is destroyed by the Ultra Gosei Great Megazord.

Admiral Malkor is voiced by Campbell Cooley.

==== Creepox ====
Creepox is a rash Praying mantis-themed warrior who is Malkor's loyal right-hand. Unlike his cohorts, he is very limited in intelligence, having little patience for planning, and extreme anger management problems. Due to this, he's in a constant state of disagreement with Prince Vrak. Creepox's main weapons are the sickles on his forearms. His size makes him the slowest, and second strongest of the Warstar. His signature moves are Meteor Shot and Galaxy Meteor Shot. Creepox claims to follow the honourable warrior's code, but is in fact a prideful, and dishonourable warrior driven by rage, who loudly proclaims the superiority of Warstar since Insectoids are clearly superior to other life-forms. He develops a rivalry with Troy after the latter refuses to fight him. In "Stranger Ranger", he engages Troy in battle, but his cockiness allows Troy to wound him. He finally meets his end in the episode "Who's Crying Now?" when he is destroyed by the Ultra Gosei Great Megazord.

Creepox is voiced by Mark Mitchinson.

==== Vrak ====
Prince Vrak is a cunning, sadistic, and treacherous alien warrior who was sent by his father Emperor Mavro to serve as the Insectoids' chief tactician, thus he is the only one who is not an Insectoid, and not part of Warstar. He solves matters with reasoning and comes up with elaborate plans, seeking to achieve victory and absolute power at all costs. Vrak can change his form between his usual lance-wielding treehopper-themed Warstar form and his gauntlet-clawed Chupacabra/house centipede-armored Toxic Mutant form. He also builds Metal Alice to lead the Robots. Mortally wounded by the destruction of the Warstar Spaceship, Vrak is rescued by Metal Alice who revives him as an ammonite-themed cyborg with his emotions and memories lost, though he eventually regains them. Vrak is the primary and most proactive enemy to the Megaforce Rangers before he goes into hiding as the Armada arrive at the suggestion of the Messenger's head since the Armada would not recognize him in his new form.

Vrak resurfaces in "Vrak is Back" following the destruction of his brother Prince Vekar where he abducts Orion to drain his powers, reprograms Robo Knight into Dark Robo Knight to serve him, and plans to tear the Earth apart with special drills. It is revealed that Emperor Mavro favors Vrak more than Vekar and that the Rangers "did him a favor" by destroying him. When fighting the Rangers, Vrak now has the ability to assume any of this three forms as well as a fourth Fallen Angel-like form (which is his True State). Vrak is finally destroyed by Troy in "Vrak is Back" Pt. 2.

Vrak is voiced by Jason Hood.

==== Loogies ====
Loogies are the lime-colored insectoid/doll-themed foot soldiers. They attack on swarms and wield daggers that double as blasters. Virox can transform humans into Loogies by sneezing on them. They are only used by Prince Vrak, the Toxic Mutants, the Robots, and Warstar.

==== Zombats ====
Zombats are Vrak's one-eyed, bat-like robots. They are used to grow monsters and certain objects. Whenever they act on someone, a blue hexagon forms with the symbol of its army at its center. An upgraded version called "Zombolts" is used when enlarging robots.

With Vrak in hiding in Super Megaforce, the Zombats are replaced by Levira's Maximizer, but Vrak uses them upon his return.

==== Insectoid Monsters ====
- Scaraba (portrayed by Anthony Ray Parker) – A scarab monster that is able to create large boulders to attack enemies. This monster was destroyed by the Power Rangers Rangers' Megaforce Blaster.
- Yuffo (voiced by Joel Tobeck in the TV series, Richard Epcar in the video game adaption) – A ladybug monster and scientist who conducts experiments and recalls a UFO. He can secretly capture nets and split himself into small UFOs. This monster was destroyed by the Gosei Great Megazord.
- Virox (voiced by Kevin Harty) – A stinkbug monster able to sneeze out a virus that turns humans into Loogies. This monster was destroyed by Sea Gosei Great Megazord.
- Dragonflay (voiced by Robert Mignault) – A dragonfly monster who is able to run at great speeds and shoot lasers from his eyes. This monster was destroyed by Land Gosei Great Megazord.
- Beezara (voiced by Sarah Banasiak) – A wasp monster who is a member of royalty. Beezara has venomous royal jelly which turns males into servants and females into enemies. This monster was destroyed by Sky Gosei Great Megazord.
- Dizchord (voiced by Dean Young) – A rhyming cricket monster that fancies himself as the best musician in the universe – but nothing could be farther from the truth. His sound is extremely painful to most people who hear it until Emma – aided by Troy – negates it with her voice. This monster was destroyed by Gosei Great Megazord.

=== Toxic Mutants ===
The Toxic Mutants are pollution-made beings whose sole wish is to intoxicate Earth and make it suitable to their kind. Each of the Toxic Mutants incorporates the hybrid appearances of a mythical creature and an invertebrate. They ally with Vrak to reach their goal. Their base is an oozy cavern near a large lake at the forest surrounding Harwood County.

==== Bigs ====
Bigs is a slimy Mutant with earthworm-like features who has an overly goofy and joyous personality. He has great respect for his toxic brethren. Direct contact with toxins enhances his strength. He uses a scepter-like cane or a set of twin staffs to fight and can dissolve into an amorphous state to evade being hit by or deflect any attacks. Being made of slime also allows Bigs to reform if the noxious ooze that makes up his body is not totally annihilated. Bigs can also harness the Aurora Box and fire it through his signature move, the Aurora Blast. He is destroyed by the Mega Rangers' Ultra Dynamic Strike in the episode "Gosei Ultimate".

Bigs is voiced by Charlie McDermott.

==== Bluefur ====
Bluefur is a short-tempered Bigfoot-themed Mutant with tarantula-like features who is the largest and strongest of his race. He wields a double-headed club in battle and uses it to bash his foes. Similarly to Bigs, Bluefur shows much esteem for his kind and regards them with great respect. He can stomp the ground with extreme force to unleash a foot-shaped shockwave or combine his double club with Bigs' cane to generate powerful balls of toxic fire as well as enter a dual formation to fix and lock Bigs' aim when the latter uses the Aurora Blast. In the episode "Gosei Ultimate", he is destroyed by the Gosei Ultimate Megazord.

Bluefur is voiced by Jay Simon in the TV series and by Jamieson Price in the video game adaption.

==== Toxic Monsters ====
- Hisser (voiced by Estevez Gillespie) – A Tsuchinoko/common pillbug-themed mutant. He can dig underground, spin extremely fast, and spew green slime. This monster was destroyed by Robo Knight in the form of the Lion Mechazord. Distractor later creates an illusion of Hisser which became real afterwards. This time, this monster was destroyed by the Rangers' Ultra Power Dynamic Strike.
- Psychotick (voiced by Kelson Henderson) – An energy-draining Kappa/tick-themed mutant that is summoned by Vrak, to drain Robo Knight's power. His signature move is "Tick Attack!". This monster was destroyed by the Gosei Grand Megazord. Distractor later creates an illusion of Psychotick which later became real. During this time, he wields an axe in battle. This time, this monster was destroyed by the Rangers' Ultra Power Dynamic Strike.
- Shadow-Serpent (voiced by Adam Gardiner) – Shadow-Serpent's a powerful snail-shelled Loch Ness Monster-themed mutant. He wields spikes in battle, can shoot lasers, breathe fire and steal shadows from other living beings with his tongue, rendering them motionless. This monster was destroyed by the Gosei Great Grand Megazord.
- Distractor (voiced by Scott Wills) – Distractor is a brocken spectre/Harvestman-themed mutant. He was enlisted by Vrak to cause a diversion on the Rangers so that he can steal the Wild Sword. Distractor made illusions of Toxic Mutants (consisting of Hisser, Psychotick, Gremlin, Mummy, Skyfish, and Kesaran) that were defeated by the Rangers. This monster was destroyed by the Ultra Power Dynamic Strike.
- Gremlin (voiced by Oscar Burt-Shearer) – A sword-wielding gremlin/flea-themed mutant. He first appeared as an illusion formed by Distractor to distract the Rangers and later took physical form. This monster was destroyed by the Rangers' Ultra Power Dynamic Strike. In "Raising Spirits," it is revealed that Gremlin has a cousin named Glytcher.
- Mummy – A staff-wielding mummy/centipede-themed mutant. He was created as an illusion and later given life by Distractor. This monster was destroyed by the Rangers' Ultra Dynamic Strike attack.
- Skyfish (voiced by Jeremy Birchall) – A double-bladed sword-wielding skyfish/stick insect-themed mutant. He was created as an illusion and later given life by Distractor as part of his army due to the power of the Wild Sword. This monster was destroyed by the Rangers' Ultra Power Dynamic Strike. He is voiced by Jeremy Birchall.
- Kesaran – A knife-like blade-wielding Kesaran-Pasaran/leech-themed mutant. He first appeared as an illusion formed by Distractor and later given physical form by Distractor as a member of his ghost army. This monster was destroyed by the Rangers' Ultra Power Dynamic Strike.
- Nojoke (voiced by Simon McKinney in the TV series, Bryce Papenbrook in the video game adaption) – A Tengu/scorpion-themed mutant who has the ability to trap people inside gourds and turn them into a nourishing drink after they dissolve within them. He does so simply because human laughter annoys him. Nojoke can flap his wings to create powerful winds and bind foes with tickling rings. This monster was destroyed by the Gosei Grand Megazord after being incapacitated by the Sea Gosei Great Megazord.
- Dream Snatcher (voiced by Joseph Rye) – A dream-eating, Spanish-accented, Baku/velvet worm-themed mutant that wields a fork and considers himself a matador. Being the test subject of the Aurora Box, a royal weapon which can enhance a Mutant a hundredfold, Dream Snatcher can eat the dreams of people that are awake, trapping them in a dark dream world and creating Roots of Despair to rot away the Earth. This monster was destroyed by the Gosei Great Grand Megazord.
- Glytcher (voiced by Oscar Burt-Shearer) – A gremlin/flea-themed mutant who is the identical cousin of Gremlin. He causes glitches in electronics and has good leaping ability. He is vulnerable to being tickled. After causing a brief power blackout on Halloween, Glytcher appears in the form of a hooded robed fortune teller to see the future of Troy, Noah, Gia, and Jake only to keep seeing the visions of the Power Rangers defeating past monsters (consisting of Virox, Dragonflay, Yuffo, and Creepox). This monster was destroyed by the Gosei Great Megazord and the Gosei Grand Megazord.

=== Robots ===
The Robots are an artificial army created to replace the Insectoids and Mutants and continue the war against humanity. Their base is Vrak's underwater laboratory located in the shallow coastal sea surrounding Harwood County.

==== Metal Alice ====
Metal Alice is a female basket star-themed robot who Vrak creates in his lab. She is completed some time after Bigs and Bluefur are defeated. Alice considers humans as inferior beings and does her best to eliminate the Power Rangers on behalf of her master. She initially tried to convince Robo Knight to join her, but he refused as humans were a part of the Earth's environment. Although at first cold and ruthless, like she was designed to be, she eventually develops feelings for Vrak after he becomes a cyborg and saves her life. When Metal Alice falls against the Megaforce alongside the Messenger however, Vrak heartlessly leaves her to die and she realizes he never really valued her at all before she finally explodes in the episode “End Game”.

Metal Alice is voiced by Sophie Henderson in the TV series and by Marieve Herington in the video game adaption.

==== Robot Monsters ====
- Rotox (voiced by Mark Wright) – Rotox is a scallop-themed robot who is the first of Metal Alice's machines. Created before Vrak to show the power of robots, he can emit lasers and chains, roll up into his shell and combine junk into a shield. Upon being born, Metal Alice attacks him and her left leg is severed. Vrak is impressed by his strength. This monster was destroyed by the Ultra Power Dynamic Strike.
  - Rotox DX (voiced by Mark Wright) – A rebuilt and upgraded version of Rotox built after gathering info about the previous battle. His strength is enhanced tenfold. He is beaten by the Ultra Knight Dynamic. Rotox DX is then enlarged by the Zombats and fights against the Gosei Grand and Gosei Ultimate Megazords. After Gosei Grand disarms Rotox DX of his claw and spear, Gosei Ultimate finishes the fight with the Ultimate Strike.
  - Water Rotox (voiced by Mark Wright) – Three robotic clones of Rotox that were used as part of the final robot onslaught. They can withstand rusting and boast a wide arsenal. Like the Loogies, however, the Megaforce easily disposes of them, each taken down by a dual attack.
- Rico (voiced by Scott Wills) – R-1-C-0 (short for Robot 1-C-0) is a mechanical starfish-themed creation of Metal Alice with an unusual purpose. Robot 1-C-0 (who was renamed Rico by Emma) was created to unveil the meaning of friendship. Though Metal Alice attempts to make Rico revert to a heartless machine, Emma and the other Rangers help him escape the Earth and therefore her control.

=== Armada ===
The Armada is a large army that is led by Emperor Mavro and Prince Vekar and was heralded by the Warstar Insectoids, their high-ranking forces. Unlike the Warstar, the Armada is composed of several ships following Prince Vekar's flagship and therefore has more monsters to use against the Rangers. When Emperor Mavro arrives, he replaces Vekar's fleet with his own, while sending out a message to all remaining Armada ships to converge on Earth. In "The Wrath", the Armada is shown to have a large number of vessels, as no sooner do the Power Rangers destroy all but Mavro's ship, a new fleet blankets the sky and destroys their Zords.

==== Prince Vekar ====
Prince Vekar is the older brother of Vrak, the eldest son of Emperor Mavro, and the primary fleet leader of the Armada. He is hot-headed, reckless, narcissistic, arrogant, deceptive, perfectionistic, and sadistic with anger management problems and little patience. He tends to overreact childishly, once demanding Damaras and Argus to stop being taller than him, and taking credit for other's accomplishments. Despite being more spoiled than Vrak, he shows clear jealousy towards his brother for being Mavro's favorite son and allowed to take on special assignments for the Armada in secret. He is rather incompetent and easily tricked. He also has a vendetta on the Power Rangers for foiling his plans, humiliating him. In the episode, "All Hail Prince Vekar", he received the Armada Megazord from his father as a gift but later he is destroyed by the Ultimate Legendary Megazord.

Prince Vekar is voiced by Stephen Butterworth in the TV series and by Sam Riegel in the video game adaptation.

==== The Messenger ====
The Messenger is a shrimp-themed robot that works as the Warstar's special envoy and advance scout. The Messenger boasts beams, missiles and lasers and a defense boosted by the Ultra Mode-like Royal Shield, his signature defense move. He joins Metal Alice shortly after Vrak's reboot and informs Vrak that the Armada is heading to Earth. He follows a warrior code of honor and loyalty.

In his final battle, the little that is left of his being following his defeat advises Vrak to conceal himself to avoid being mistaken for an enemy by the invasion forces comprising the Armada under the command of Vrak's older brother Prince Vekar. Every part of him except his head was destroyed by the Eangers’ ultra power knight dynamic strike. Before his head was destroyed during the invasion of the Armada, he advised Vrak to run as the Armada won't recognize his current form.

Messenger is voiced by Andrew Laing.

==== Levira ====
Levira is a thermographic scientist who works on behalf of Prince Vekar. Levira is also the inventor of the Maximizer (satellite-like devices on the Armada's flagship that fires purple lasers) which she uses to grow more than one monster at a time. Levira is quite close to Prince Vekar, being his confidant and occasional co-conspirator. She is very cold and ruthless to others. In battle, Levira wields a laser whip. Forced by Emperor Mavro to prove herself by defeating the Power Rangers, Levira takes them on in her own Levira Megazord, but it is destroyed, leading to a face-to-face fight. Badly wounded, Levira begs Emperor Mavro to use the Maximizer to revive her before she would explode, but he instead lets her be destroyed since he was just using her to distract the Rangers while the Armada gets reinforcements.

Levira is voiced by Rebecca Parr.

==== Argus ====
Argus is a cyborg who works as the personal bodyguard of Prince Vekar. Fiercely loyal to Vekar, he is most commonly known for his catchphrase "Yes, boss" whenever Vekar gives an order. He is eventually destroyed in battle against Noah.

Argus is voiced by Mark Wright in the TV series and by Tony Oliver in the video game adaption.

==== Damaras ====
Damaras is a general who works for Prince Vekar and was given orders by Emperor Mavro not to let anything happen to him. He is Prince Vekar's second-in-command and is far more level-headed than his superior. He often comes up with ideas that Prince Vekar takes credit for; however, he doesn't point this out. Damaras finally questions Vekar's leadership and feels guilty for not assisting him when he is destroyed by the Rangers. He is sent by Mavro for one last chance at redemption by capturing Troy. Though Damaras succeeds, he is later foiled and destroyed by the other Rangers. He is the final member of the Armada to be revived and enlarged by Levira's Maximizer.

Damaras is voiced by John Leigh in the TV series and by Patrick Seitz in the video game adaption.

==== Emperor Mavro ====
Emperor Mavro is the kraken-themed ruler of the Armada, the father to Vrak and Vekar, and the supreme ruler of its military. At some time before the series began, he made an agreement with Malkor, that folded the two empires together and made him the commander of the advance scouts. He obviously favored his younger son Vrak evident when Vekar overheard his conversation with Damaras that lead to his resentment towards Mavro and wanting to prove to him that he's more than a blunderer. Shortly after Vekar and Vrak's deaths, Emperor Mavro arrives in orbit around the planet Earth to avenge his son's deaths, and conquer the Earth. Desiring the swift demise of the rangers, he gives Damaras and Levira shots at getting back into his good graces, and sends them off on suicide missions due to their misplaced sense of loyalty. However, Emperor Mavro does succeed in damaging both megazords. In the final battle, Emperor Mavro was defeated by Troy and Orion, but survived the crash, then took on the entire team with every last bit of endurance in him. Mavro was destroyed for good by the combined powers of the Super Mega Rangers and the Super Mega Cannon. After his destruction the last remaining Armada soldiers converged on the Rangers location.

Emperor Mavro is voiced by Mike Drew.

==== X Borgs ====
The X Borgs are the robotic foot soldiers of the Armada, marked with an "X" on their chests. Being mechanical, they lack the weakness of suffering from fatigue, and thus are much harder to defeat than Loogies. As revealed in the "Silver Lining" two parter, the Armada has enough X Borgs, or can mass-produce them fast enough, to launch repeated attacks in the same day.

==== Bruisers ====
The Bruisers are the elite foot soldiers of the Armada. They are much more powerful than the X Borgs and can transform into fighter jets for aerial combat. The Bruisers can also be enlarged by the Maximizer to help fight the Megazords and can even assume a half-motorcycle form when enlarged.

==== Royal Guards ====
The Royal Guards are red versions of the Bruisers that are always seen in pairs and are stronger than Bruisers (and can talk!). They are part of the elite squadron of warriors, serving as bodyguards and commandos to the royal family.

==== Armada Field Commanders ====
The Armada uses monsters called Armada Field Commanders in leading their invasions, some of them being generals or well-trained soldiers. To make their monsters grow, the Armada enlarges them by using the Armada flag ship's Maximizer laser cannons.

- Headridge (voiced by Cameron Rhodes in the TV series, Patrick Seitz in the video game adaption) – A lamprey monster who was the first alien monster that is sent by the Armada, leading X Borgs into attacking some humans until the Super Megaforce Rangers arrived. This monster was destroyed by the Super Megaforce Rangers' Final Strike.
- Tentacus (voiced by Ryan Cooper) – An octopus monster who is sent down by the Armada following Headridge's destruction. This monster was destroyed by the Legendary Megazord.
- Cybax (voiced by Adam Gardiner) – A cybernetic brain coral monster who is sent down by the Armada to oversee the missile-launching upon the major cities of the world. This monster was destroyed by the Legendary SPD Megazord. (Note: Cybax's Japanese equivalent is associated with the Troobians' Japanese equivalent.)
- Skatana (voiced by Nic Sampson) – A master swordsman monster whose sword skills are so good that he can even slice through buildings, perform the Blade of Infinity attack, and perform the Infinity Octo-Blade attack. This monster was destroyed by the Legendary Mystic Force Megaforce.
- General Peluso (voiced by James Gaylyn) – A spider crab/dog monster and high-ranking Armada general with a cybernetic left arm that possesses super-speed. This monster was sent by Damaras and Levira to look for the Red Lion Wild Zord on Animaria. This monster was destroyed by the Legendary Wild Force Megazord.
- Pacha Chamak (voiced by Peter Daube) – An Incan-themed magnetic monster with retractable arms on his shoulders whose hand-to-hand combat is known to beat any of his opponents. This monster was destroyed by the combined power of the Jungle Fury animal spirits and the Legendary Megazord.
- Gorgax (voiced by Joel Tobeck in the TV series, Sam Riegel in the video game adaption) – A shrimp monster who leads an army of X Borgs into attacking the center of the city to detonate a bomb there. Besides performing energy attacks from his hands, he can use a force field collar on him that can block attacks. This monster was destroyed by the Orion's Super Silver Spear.
- Commander Osogain (voiced by Peter Feeney in the TV series, Tony Oliver in the video game adaption) – A horseshoe crab/rhinoceros monster who is summoned by Damaras to destroy Orion. This monster was destroyed by the Q-Rex Megazord.
- Skeltox (voiced by Greg Ward in the TV series, Mark Allen Jr. in the video game adaption) – A green skeleton monster with a skeletal piranha for a left hand and forearm. He wields a fishing rod-type weapon to drain human energy from people and can shoot lasers from his skeleton fish arm. This monster was destroyed by the Q-Rex Megazord.
- Sirjinkor (voiced by Campbell Cooley) – A starfish monster. He was sent by Damaras to put a stone on a rock that Vrak was working on, but never finished completing. After placing the stone on Vrak's Powermid, Sirjinkor absorbed the power from it and became stronger than ever, summoning an asteroid to destroy the Earth. This monster was destroyed by the Legendary Samurai Megazord.
- Invidious (voiced by Owen Black) – A sea slug monster who had a childhood crush on Levira. He can perform fire-based attacks. He created a love potion to make Levira fall in love with him only for her to fall in love with Jake, when in the sentai footage she falls in love with Red Racer, and therefore TJ the second red turboranger should have appeared in the episode. This monster was defeated by the Legendary Samurai Megazord yet survived; only to face humiliation and rejection.
- Desolar (voiced by Byron Coll) – An amoeba-themed monster who wields a broom-like staff that can steal human happiness and wears a belt with a dial that enable him to size shift and turn invisible. He can also perform wind attacks, shoot eye beams, and emit tentacles. Desolar was sent by Levira to steal all the humans' happiness to cure Prince Vekar's cold. This monster was destroyed by the Legendary Q-Rex Megazord.
- Tranceferer (voiced by Mark Scott) – A squid/clown monster that can swap the bodies of anyone and emit tentacles. He was sent down to swap the bodies of specific people to infiltrate Earth's government only to end up swapping Jake and Noah's bodies in the process. This monster was destroyed by the Legendary Ninja Megazord.
- Turtlelini (voiced by Paul Harrop) – A sea turtle monster. He wields a hyper dense shell shield which protects him from harm and can shoot energy lightning. He was sent down to distract the Rangers while Tranceferer continues his job. This monster was destroyed by the Super Mega Cannon.
- Professor Cog (voiced by Cameron Rhodes) – A robot from the reality of Power Rangers RPM first defeated in "Clash of the Red Rangers: The Movie." Being rebuilt sometime after that battle (except with his screwdriver and wrench hands mirrored from his previous appearance), Professor Cog unleashed the Turbo Falcon Zord on Corinth as a diversion so that he and an army of Grinders could escape to the Megaforce Rangers' reality to invade Earth. This monster was destroyed by Legendary RPM Megazord. (Note: The Japanese equivalent of this Professor Cog is actually the son of Professor Cog's Japanese equivalent.)
- Tresnag (voiced by Phil Brown) – A three-headed Unicorn/Cerberus monster with arm-mounted blades that assisted Vrak in a plan to use special drills to destroy the Earth. He can shoot beams from his three horns, shrink his body into his three heads, and transform into a right-handed bladed gauntlet for Vrak to use where he can create an energy shield and ram his opponents at high speed. Tresnag and Drill Horn worked for Emperor Mavro off-screen whilst his master, Prince Vrak was working for War Star. When the Gosei Great Megazord's Sea Megazord form finished him off with the Sea Strike, Tresnag gleefully celebrated in succeeding in his role in Vrak's master plan and becoming the second drill.
- Drill Horn (voiced by Paul Harrop) – A four-headed Hydra/Satyr monster with arm-mounted drills that assisted Vrak in a plan to use special drills to destroy the Earth. He is shown to be very strong, can fire his drills, and can transform into a left-handed drill gauntlet for Vrak to wield where he can create an energy shield and ram his opponents at high speed. Drill Horn and Tresnag worked for Emperor Mavro, whilst Vrak was with War Star. This monster was destroyed by the Gosei Ultimate Megazord. After being destroyed, Drill Horn became the third and final drill.

==== The Imperial Guard ====
These monsters are the commanders of the elite Guard, serving directly under the rule of the royal family. They are shown to be far stronger than the Field Commanders.

- Matacore (voiced by Richard Simpson) – A crab monster and sub-commander of the Imperial Guard who was sent by Emperor Mavro to assist Prince Vekar in attacking Earth. He wields a sword in battle. He was destroyed by the Legendary Samurai Megazord.
- Redker (voiced by Adrian Smith) – A stonefish monster and commander of the Imperial Guard with long arm razors that serves Emperor Mavro. He wields a large mallet in battle, attacks with his arm razors and can fire lasers from his shoulders. He arrives alongside Yellzor with Emperor Mavro to seize control of the Armada and punish Damaras. He was destroyed by the Super Mega Cannon.
- Yellzor (voiced by Jeremy Birchall) – A seahorse monster and commander of the Imperial Guard that serves Emperor Mavro. He can shoot strong and focused lasers from his chest and the blaster he has as a left arm. He arrives alongside Redker with Emperor Mavro to seize control of the Armada and punish Damaras, and after that, he isn't seen again after he was dismissed by Mavro before he is killed on the final invasion.
