= Power Rangers Megaforce =

American television series

- The logo for Power Rangers Megaforce (first season)
- Also known as: Power Rangers Super Megaforce
- Genre: Action-adventure; Science fantasy; Superhero; Tokusatsu; Comedy
- Created by: Haim Saban; Toei Company; Ishimori Productions
- Based on: Tensou Sentai Goseiger & Kaizoku Sentai Gokaiger by Toei Company
- Developed by: Saban Brands; Toei Company
- Showrunner: Jonathan Tzachor
- Directed by: Jonathan Tzachor; Jonathan Brough; James Barr; Yuji Noguchi; John Laing; Charlie Haskell
- Starring: Andrew Gray; Ciara Hanna; John Mark Loudermilk; Christina Masterson; Azim Rizk; Shailesh Prajapati; Ian Harcourt; Cameron Jebo
- Opening theme: "Go Go Power Rangers"
- Composer: Noam Kaniel
- Countries of origin: United States; Japan
- Original language: English
- No. of seasons: 2
- No. of episodes: 42

Production
- Executive producers: Haim Saban; Jonathan Tzachor
- Producers: Elie Dekel; Brian Casentini; Joel Andryc (Super Megaforce)
- Production locations: New Zealand (Auckland Region) (Auckland); Japan (Greater Tokyo Area) (Tokyo, Saitama, Yokohama) and Kyoto)
- Cinematography: Ilan Rosenberg; Sean McLin (2nd unit)
- Camera setup: Single-camera
- Running time: 23 minutes
- Production companies: Saban Brands; Power Rangers Productions; Toei Company; MarVista Entertainment

Original release
- Network: Nickelodeon
- Release: February 2, 2013 – November 22, 2014

Related
- Power Rangers television series

Power Rangers Megaforce is a television series and the eighteenth entry of the Power Rangers franchise. The show is produced by Saban Brands and began airing on Nickelodeon on February 2, 2013. The show was part of the Power Rangers 20th anniversary. Kidscreen reported that Megaforce featured "the return of many historic Rangers." Megaforce uses footage, costumes and props from the Japanese Super Sentai Series Tensou Sentai Goseiger.

The second season, and twenty-first overall, is called Power Rangers Super Megaforce and premiered on February 15, ending on November 22, 2014. Super Megaforce uses footage, costumes and props from Kaizoku Sentai Gokaiger. Their sentai counterpart shows are angel and pirate themed. The series also used footage from Kaizoku Sentai Gokaiger with footage with suits from before Kyōryū Sentai Zyuranger.

This is also the first series to use the phrase "it's Morphin' Time" since Power Rangers Zeo.

== Plot summary ==
=== Season 1: Megaforce ===
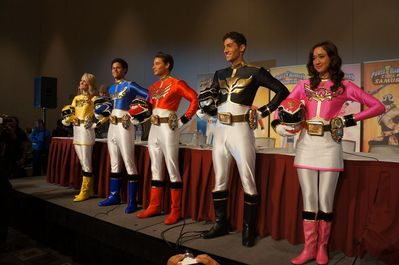
The Megaforce cast at the Power Rangers fan convention Power Morphicon in 2012.

When the evil Warstar aliens attack Earth, the supernatural guardian Gosei, assigned to protect the Earth by Zordon, and his faithful robot assistant Tensou recruit a group of teenagers - Troy Burrows, Jake Holling, Gia Moran, Noah Carver, and Emma Goodall - to combat the invading forces. Equipped with powers that grant them mastery over martial arts and other forms of combat, the teenagers transform into the latest champions of good: the Power Rangers Megaforce.

=== Season 2: Super Megaforce ===
In the second Super Megaforce season, when an alien armada led by Prince Vekar - the brother of Vrak - plans to invade the Earth, Gosei gives the Megaforce Rangers new Morphers and special keys to allow them to become the Super Megaforce Rangers and also imbues them with the power to transform into any past "Legendary" Power Rangers. In course of time, due to their virtues and fighting spirit, they unlock various megazords of the past rangers (meeting several along the way.). An alien named Orion, whose home world was destroyed by the armada, then joins their ranks as the Silver Ranger, and gets all the legendary Sixth Ranger along with those of Robo Knight. Later, in a battle with the most powerful machines of evil, the Megazords of the Rangers as well as their Legendary Megazords are destroyed. After that, Troy and Orion enter the ship of Vrak and Vekar's father the Warstar Emperor Marvo, fight him, and unleash the ship's power, which destroys every other ship in the Armada. Later they both succeed in destroying Marvo and then they return to the ground. The Rangers then find that thousands of X-Borgs, the innumerable soldiers of The Armada, have been let loose on them. At this point, all the Legendary Rangers, whose powers the Rangers have been using throughout the series, appear to help them. Together, all the Rangers destroy the X-Borgs, saving the Earth.

== Cast and characters ==
Power Rangers

- Andrew Gray as Troy Burrows, the Megaforce/Super Megaforce Red Ranger
- Christina Masterson as Emma Goodall, the Megaforce/Super Megaforce Pink Ranger
- Azim Rizk as Jake Holling, the Megaforce Black/Super Megaforce Green Ranger
- Ciara Hanna as Gia Moran, the Megaforce/Super Megaforce Yellow Ranger
- John Mark Loudermilk as Noah Carver, the Megaforce/Super Megaforce Blue Ranger
- Chris Auer as the voice of Robo Knight
- Cameron Jebo as Orion, the Super Megaforce Silver Ranger

Supporting characters

- Geoff Dolan as the voices of Gosei, Gosei Morpher, and Robo Morpher
- Estevez Gillespie as the voice of Tensou
- Shailesh Prajapati as Ernie
- Ian Harcourt as Mr. Burley

Villains

- Jason Hood as the voice of Vrak the younger brother of Vekar, the main and primary antagonist of the series.
- Phil Brown and Paul Harrop as the voices of Tresnag and Drill Horn
- Campbell Cooley as the voice of Admiral Malkor
- Mark Mitchinson as the voice of Creepox
- Charlie McDermott as the voice of Bigs
- Jay Simon as the voice of Bluefur
- Sophie Henderson as the voice of Metal Alice
- Andrew Laing as the voice of Messenger a minor villain from the Armada.
- Stephen Butterworth as the voice of Prince Vekar the older brother of Vrak.
- Rebecca Parr as the voice of Levira
- Mike Drew as the voice of Emperor Mavro the father of Vrak and Vekar.
- John Leigh as Damaras
- Mark Wright as Argus
- Cameron Rhodes as the voice of Professor Cog

Guest stars

- Jason David Frank as Tommy Oliver, the Green Ranger and the White Ranger, and subsequently Zeo Ranger V, Red, the original Red Turbo Ranger and the Black Dino Thunder Ranger.
- Selwyn Ward as Theodore Jay "T.J." Jarvis Johnson, the Blue Space Ranger, and previously the new Red Turbo Ranger.
- Patricia Ja Lee as Cassie Chan, The Pink Space Ranger and previously the new Pink Turbo Ranger.
- Danny Slavin as Leo Corbett, the Red Galaxy Ranger.
- Reggie Rolle as Damon Henderson, The Green Galaxy Ranger.
- Melody Perkins as Karone, the new Pink Galaxy Ranger, and the former Astronema.
- Sean Cw Johnson as Carter Grayson, the Red Lightspeed Ranger.
- Alison MacInnis as Dana Mitchell, the Pink Lightspeed Ranger.
- Jason Faunt as Wesley "Wes" Collins, the Red Time Force Ranger.
- Jason Smith as Casey Rhodes, the Red Jungle Fury Ranger.
- Alex Heartman as Jayden Shiba, The Red Samurai Ranger.
- Hector David Jr. as Mike, The Green Samurai Ranger.
- Brittany Anne Pirtle as Emily, The Yellow Samurai Ranger.

== Episodes ==
=== Season 1: Power Rangers Megaforce (2013) ===
No. overall	No. in season	Title	Directed by	Written by	Original release date
1	1	"Mega Mission"	Jonathan Tzachor	James W. Bates	February 2, 2013
Troy, the new kid in school, has a dream on the school bus of many Power Ranger teams battling an unknown enemy army. Meanwhile, the Insectoid-like race known as Warstar plans to invade Earth. Gosei, an intergalactic wizard who was an apprentice of Zordon (mentor of the Mighty Morphin Power Rangers) awakens from his sleep and has his robot aid Tensou summon "a group of teenagers with attitude" to fend off Warstar's threats. The five new Power Rangers - Troy, Noah, Gia, Emma, and Jake - are summoned to Gosei's stronghold and are given their new Power Ranger gear, and then proceed to defeat the invading Warstar forces and win their first battle.
2	2	"He Blasted Me with Science"	Jonathan Tzachor	David McDermott	February 9, 2013
Warstar's scientist Yuffo is sent to study humanity to figure out how the invasion can be completed more efficiently and to discover a way to defeat the Power Rangers. Troy is approached by Creepox in the forest, trying to goad him into a fight, but Troy refuses. Yuffo proceeds to attack the Power Rangers, but they combine their weapons and are victorious. However, the alien threat is super-sized using a Warstar technology called Zombats, leading the Megaforce Rangers to learn to call upon their Zords. Meanwhile, Jake tries to impress Gia, only to get nowhere.
3	3	"Going Viral"	Jonathan Brough	Marc Handler	February 16, 2013
Jake brings his Snake-Axe in a guitar case to use as a weight to strengthen himself. But when Noah has trouble lifting Jake's heavy weapon, he begins to doubt his abilities until he learns that he can do anything if he believes in himself. Warstar sends Virox to infect humans with one sneeze, turning them into Loogies, Warstar foot soldiers, leading the Rangers to quarantine the infected. Noah's belief in his abilities enables him to unlock a new Zord combination and defeat the monster Virox. Afterward, Noah replaces Jake's heavy ax with a lighter metal for better balance, only for Jake to be initially unable to swing the ax properly.
4	4	"Stranger Ranger"	Jonathan Brough	Seth Walther	February 23, 2013
A civilian named Jordan falsely claims to be one of the Power Rangers, distracting the real Power Rangers from their attempts to focus their concentration on training for future battles, particularly the attacks of Dragonflay. The Rangers eventually defeat the Warstar monster. Jordan eventually admits to the public that he is not a Power Ranger, later telling Troy he has learned that it is better to be himself.
5	5	"United We Stand"	Jonathan Brough	Jill Donnellan	March 2, 2013
After finding and taking a picture of a very rare flower, Emma and Gia are hit with a curse by the newest warstar monster Beezara into hating each other, to the point where they can't even agree on the same thing, while turning the boys into her mindless and obedient slaves, fortunately, with their help, the girls are able to break the curse and destroy Beezara.
6	6	"Harmony and Dizchord"	James Barr	Seth Walther	March 9, 2013
The episode starts with Troy jogging where he finds Emma singing. Dizchord, a musical themed monster, attacks the city with music that produces physical pain to human eardrums, fortunately, the Rangers manage to turn the tables of the fight in an unorthodox way and defeat him with a song of their own.
7	7	"Who's Crying Now?"	Jonathan Tzachor	Seth Walther	March 16, 2013
After Troy defends a kid from bullies that want to crush the rare insect that he has found. Afterwards, Creepox, who was goaded by Vrak into fighting the rangers after his previous defeat at Troy's hand, first against the bullies from earlier, and eventually against the red ranger himself, despite the odds, the rangers defeat him once and for all, and discover that the bullies (who were saved from the kid they bullied before) have gained newfound respect for him and go on to learn more about his bug.
8	8	"Robo Knight"	Jonathan Tzachor	Marc Handler	March 30, 2013
Robo Knight awakens to help the Rangers when the Toxic Mutants awaken and threaten to pollute the environment with their monster Hisser.
9	9	"Prince Takes Knight"	Jonathan Tzachor	David McDermott & Seth Walther	April 6, 2013
Vrak and Psychotick capture Robo Knight in order to reprogram him to serve the Warstar.
10	10	"Man and Machine"	John Laing	Seth Walther	September 7, 2013
The Megaforce Rangers must teach Robo Knight the meaning of teamwork at the time when Vrak and the Toxic Mutants unleash the powerful Shadow Serpent upon the city.
11	11	"Ultra Power"	John Laing	Jim Peronto	September 14, 2013
The Megaforce Rangers must find a powerful ancient weapon called the Wild Sword in the Black Mountains. Vrak plans to get to the sword first where he enlist the help of Distractor.
12	12	"Last Laugh"	John Laing	Jill Donnellan	September 28, 2013
Gia, Emma, Troy, and Jake are captured by Nojoke during his capture of laughing people. Noah and Robo Knight must overcome their differences to free the captive Rangers and defeat Nojoke.
13	13	"Dream Snatcher"	Yuji Noguchi	Jill Donnellan & James W. Bates	October 5, 2013
A dream-eating monster called Dream Snatcher preys on Emma after being powered up by the Aurora Box that belonged to Vrak's family. The Rangers and Robo Knight must rescue Emma's dreams and defeat Dream Snatcher before the Roots of Despair emitted from his victims rot the Earth.
14	14	"Gosei Ultimate"	Yuji Noguchi	Marc Handler	October 12, 2013
Gosei and the Rangers must work together to defeat Bluefur and Bigs once and for all when they use the power of the Aurora Box to make themselves stronger.
15	15	"Raising Spirits"	James Barr	Jim Peronto	October 19, 2013
In this Halloween special, the Rangers meet a medium whose crystal ball curiously shows them previous battles - and raises their suspicions by acting in favor of the creatures and villains shown. The fortune teller reveals his identity as a mutant named Glytcher and attempts to cause all electronics in the city to malfunction. With Emma's help, the Rangers must find a way to defeat him and save Halloween.
16	16	"The Human Factor"	Yuji Noguchi	David McDermott	October 26, 2013 (Note: This episode aired in France on September 13, 2013.)
Vrak's newest creation Metal Alice tries to convince Robo Knight to work for her and her robot army rather than the Power Rangers.
17	17	"Rico the Robot"	Yuji Noguchi	Jill Donnellan	November 2, 2013 (Note: This episode aired in France on September 16, 2013.)
Metal Alice's robot Rico malfunctions and Emma and the Power Rangers try to teach it compassion.
18	18	"Staying on Track"	James Barr	Jim Peronto	November 9, 2013 (Note: This episode aired in France on September 17, 2013.)
Metal Alice plans to attack the city by derailing a train while Robo Knight learns what it means to be human when he meets a young boy.
19	19	"The Human Condition"	James Barr	David McDermott	November 16, 2013 (Note: This episode aired in France on September 18, 2013.)
As Robo Knight continues to explore humanity, Admiral Malkor awakens from his cocoon and heads out to destroy the Power Rangers.
20	20	"The Messenger"	John Laing	Marc Handler	November 23, 2013 (Note: This episode aired in France on September 19, 2013.)
Metal Alice converts Vrak into a robot/cyborg to attack the Power Rangers when she is visited by a robot known as Messenger who informs her the invasion will soon begin.
21	21	"End Game"	John Laing	Seth Walther	November 30, 2013 (Note: This episode aired in France on September 20, 2013.)
The Power Rangers fight against Cyborg Vrak, Metal Alice, and Messenger to save the Earth, even if it might cost them all of their powers.
22	22	"The Robo Knight Before Christmas"	James Barr	James W. Bates	December 7, 2013
In this Christmas special, Robo Knight learns the true meaning of Christmas from a group of children when he disguises himself as a donated Christmas toy and is shipped in a charity crate to Africa. Once in Africa, he tells the children in an African village about his life and the heroic actions of the Power Rangers.

=== Season 2: Power Rangers Super Megaforce (2014) ===
No. overall	No. in season	Title	Directed by	Written by	Original release date	U.S. viewers (millions)
23	1	"Super Megaforce"	James Barr	James W. Bates	February 15, 2014 (Note: This episode was made available on the Nickelodeon website for early access streaming on February 9, 2014.)	2.14
The Armada has begun their invasion on Earth and Robo Knight has disappear, and the Power Rangers fight hard against the X-Borgs that the Armada has unleashed. Gosei presents them with new Morphers that unlock a Super Mega Mode, which allows them to access the powers of every previous team of Power Rangers in their fight against the monsters Headridge and Tentacus.
24	2	"Earth Fights Back"	James Barr	Jill Donnellan	February 22, 2014	1.90
Troy discovers a plot by the Armada to attack major cities around the world with missiles and must fight Cybax and the X Borgs on his own as the others are busy rebuilding the city.: This episode is a tribute to Power Rangers S.P.D.
25	3	"Blue Saber Saga"	Yuji Noguchi	Jason Smith	March 1, 2014	1.81
After being defeated in battle by a master swordsman monster called Skatana, Noah wonders if he is worthy to be a Power Ranger anymore and ends up training to counter Skatana's attacks.
26	4	"A Lion's Alliance"	Charlie Haskell	Jim Peronto and Amira Lopez	March 8, 2014	2.05
The Power Rangers take the Sky Ship to Animaria to look for the Red Lion Wild Zord. They soon find themselves in competition against General Peluso who is also after the Red Lion Wild Zord.: This episode is a tribute to Power Rangers Wild Force.
27	5	"Samurai Surprise"	Yuji Noguchi	Jason Smith	March 15, 2014	2.24
The emperor unleashes a powerful monster called Matacore to combat the Rangers. When fighting Matacore, the Power Rangers meet Jayden (the Red Samurai Ranger) and Mentor Ji who provide a disk to help them fight Matacore.: Guest Stars: Rene Naufahu and Alex Heartman.; This episode is a tribute to Power Rangers Samurai and Super Samurai.
28	6	"Spirit of the Tiger"	Yuji Noguchi	Samuel P. McLean	March 22, 2014	1.72
After the magnetic monster Pacha Chamak steals the Power Rangers' weapons, Jake and Emma consult with Casey Rhodes (the Jungle Fury Red Ranger who is now a part-time zookeeper) to learn a special form of martial arts.: Guest Star: Jason Smith.; This episode is a tribute to Power Rangers Jungle Fury.
29	7	"Silver Lining"	Charlie Haskell	Seth Walther	April 5, 2014	1.61
30	8	"Silver Lining"	Charlie Haskell	Jill Donnellan	April 12, 2014	1.47
When the Armada sends down X Borg platoons after X Borg platoons, the Megaforce Rangers have their encounter with the Silver Ranger even when they are facing off against Gorgax. The Silver Ranger, who is known as Orion, explains his origins to the Rangers, Gosei, and Tensou. Meanwhile, Damaras sends Commander Osegain to Earth in a plot to destroy Orion.
31	9	"Power of Six"	James Barr	Jason Smith	August 30, 2014 (Note: This episode was made available on the Nickelodeon website for early access streaming on August 22, 2014.)	1.50
When the Rangers are sidelined by an energy-draining monster named Skeltox, Jake must get over his jealousy of Orion and help him master the powers of the Sixth Rangers in order to defeat Skeltox.
32	10	"The Perfect Storm"	Jonathan Tzachor	Jim Peronto	September 6, 2014	1.52
The Rangers are sidetracked from fighting Sirjinkor when Tensou develops amnesia and wanders away from the Command Center.
33	11	"Love Is in the Air"	James Barr	Jill Donnellan	September 13, 2014	1.12
A love potion made by Invidious accidentally makes Levira fall in love with Jake. Upon discovering this, Invidious plans to eliminate Jake so that he can have Levira for himself.: This episode is a tribute to Power Rangers Turbo.
34	12	"United as One"	James Barr	Seth Walther	September 27, 2014 (Note: This episode was first broadcast in Russia on September 14, 2014, then in France on September 15, 2014, and in the United Kingdom on September 23, 2014.)	1.34
When the Legendary Megazord is damaged in a fight against Desolar (who is stealing the happiness from humans in order to cure Prince Vekar's cold), Emma uses unconventional methods to defeat this unusual monster.: This episode is a tribute to Power Rangers Dino Thunder.
35	13	"The Grass is Always Greener... or Bluer"	Charlie Haskell	David Schneider	October 4, 2014 (Note: This episode was first broadcast in France on September 16, 2014, and then in Russia on September 20, 2014, and the United Kingdom on September 24, 2014.)	1.53
A body-swapping monster named Tranceferer switches Jake and Noah's bodies while on a mission to swap the bodies of high-ranking people. While Tranceferer continues his mission, the monster Turtlelini is sent down to distract the Rangers, causing Jake and Noah to handle fighting in each other's bodies.
36	14	"In the Driver's Seat"	Charlie Haskell	Seth Walther	October 11, 2014 (Note: This episode was first broadcast in France on September 16, 2014, and then in Russia on September 21, 2014, and the United Kingdom on September 25, 2014.)	1.56
The Rangers are lured away from Earth and into Corinth by Professor Cog, who locks the wormhole to Corinth. While the Rangers work to tame the Turbo Falcon Zord, Professor Cog and his Grinders attack Earth and run into competition in the Armada form. The Rangers must find a way to tame the Turbo Falcon Zord and find a way back to Earth to stop Professor Cog.: This episode is a tribute to Power Rangers RPM.
37	15	"All Hail Prince Vekar"	Charlie Haskell	Jason Smith	October 18, 2014 (Note: This episode was first broadcast in France on September 17, 2014, and then in the United Kingdom on September 26, 2014, and Russia on September 27, 2014.)	1.41
The Rangers finally battle Vrak's older brother Prince Vekar face-to-face when he comes to Earth armed with his very own Megazord.
38	16	"Vrak Is Back"	James Barr	James W. Bates	October 25, 2014 (Note: This episode was first broadcast in France on September 17, 2014, and then in the United Kingdom on September 29, 2014, and Russia on September 28, 2014.)	1.37
39	17	"Vrak Is Back"	James Barr	James W. Bates	November 1, 2014 (Note: This episode was first broadcast in France on September 18, 2014, and then in the United Kingdom on September 30, 2014, and Russia on October 4, 2014.)	1.59
Following his older brother Prince Vekar's death, Vrak resurfaces and makes his latest plan to destroy Earth with the help of a reprogrammed Robo Knight. With two of the drills in the Earth that were placed by Vrak, the Rangers must rescue Orion from Vrak and free Robo Knight from Vrak's control once and for all before the final drill can be placed.
40	18	"Emperor Mavro"	Charlie Haskell	Jill Donnellan	November 8, 2014 (Note: This episode was first broadcast in France on September 18, 2014, and then in the United Kingdom on October 1, 2014, and Russia on October 5, 2014.)	1.10
Emperor Mavro comes to Earth following the deaths of his sons Vrak and Prince Vekar and replaces Prince Vekar's fleet with his fleet. He also plans to punish Damaras for what happened to Prince Vekar, yet gives a chance to Damaras to redeem himself by destroying the Power Rangers.
41	19	"The Wrath"	Charlie Haskell	Seth Walther	November 15, 2014 (Note: This episode was first broadcast in France on September 19, 2014, and then in the United Kingdom on October 2, 2014, and Russia on October 11, 2014, and as part of the extended version on November 24, 2014.)	1.76
Emperor Mavro launches an attack on Earth by calling all Armada forces across the galaxy to drop what they are doing in their positions and head to Earth. He also sends Levira to fight the Rangers to redeem herself for the death of Prince Vekar and Vrak and to make up for Damaras' failure.
42	20	"Legendary Battle"	Charlie Haskell	Seth Walther	November 22, 2014 (Note: This episode was first broadcast in France on September 19, 2014, and then in the United Kingdom on October 3, 2014, and Russia on October 12, 2014, and as part of the extended version on November 24, 2014.)	1.89
When Emperor Mavro and his remaining fleet continue their attack on Earth; the Megaforce Rangers receive help from every Legendary Power Ranger that came before them in the final massive battle against the Armada. Notable returning Power Rangers include Tommy Oliver (Green Mighty Morphin Ranger), T.J. Johnson (Blue Space Ranger), Cassie Chan (Pink Space Ranger), Leo Corbett (Red Galaxy Ranger), Damon Henderson (Green Galaxy Ranger), Karone (Pink Galaxy Ranger), Carter Grayson (Red Lightspeed Ranger), Dana Mitchell (Pink Lightspeed Ranger), Wesley Collins (Red Time Force Ranger), Mike (Green Samurai Ranger), and Emily (Yellow Samurai Ranger).: Guest Stars: Sean Cw Johnson, Alison MacInnis, Danny Slavin, Selwyn Ward, Patricia Ja Lee, Jason David Frank, Jason Faunt, Reggie Rolle, Melody Perkins, Hector David Jr., and Brittany Anne Pirtle.
Special	Special	"The Legendary Battle: Extended Edition"	Charlie Haskell	Seth Walther	November 24, 2014	N/A
Emperor Mavro launches an attack on Earth by calling all Armada forces across the galaxy to drop what they are doing in their positions and head to Earth. He also sends Levira to fight the Rangers to redeem herself for the death of Prince Vekar and Vrak and to make up for Damaras' failure. When Emperor Mavro and his remaining fleet continue their attack on Earth; the Megaforce Rangers receive help from every Legendary Power Ranger that came before them in the final massive battle against the Armada. Notable returning Power Rangers include Tommy Oliver (Green Mighty Morphin Ranger), T.J. Johnson (Blue Space Ranger), Cassie Chan (Pink Space Ranger), Leo Corbett (Red Galaxy Ranger), Damon Henderson (Green Galaxy Ranger), Karone (Pink Galaxy Ranger), Carter Grayson (Red Lightspeed Ranger), Dana Mitchell (Pink Lightspeed Ranger), Wesley Collins (Red Time Force Ranger), Mike (Green Samurai Ranger) and Emily (Yellow Samurai Ranger).: Guest Stars: Sean Cw Johnson, Alison MacInnis, Danny Slavin, Selwyn Ward, Patricia Ja Lee, Jason David Frank, Jason Faunt, Reggie Rolle, Melody Perkins, Hector David Jr., and Brittany Anne Pirtle. A television special that combines the episodes "The Wrath" and "Legendary Battle," along with alternate dialog and additional footage not seen in either episode's original airing. This special first aired on Nicktoons instead of Nickelodeon. The special is not counted as a numbered episode towards the season or Power Rangers franchise overall, but in-universe, it is considered in continuity over "The Wrath" and "Legendary Battle" as the definitive ending to the season.

== Promotion ==
The Megaforce Power Rangers appeared at the 2012 Macy's Thanksgiving Day Parade, along with the past Red Rangers from Mighty Morphin Power Rangers through Power Rangers Super Samurai. The Rangers' Super Megaforce forms later appeared alongside the Mighty Morphin' Rangers during the 2013 Macy's Thanksgiving Day Parade.
