= List of Power Rangers Samurai characters =

Power Rangers Samurai and Super Samurai are the 2011 and 2012 seasons of Power Rangers, respectively, telling the story of the battle between the Samurai Rangers and the evil Master Xandred's Nighloks.

== Samurai Power Rangers ==
The Samurai Power Rangers

The Samurai Rangers are descendants of samurai who reside at the Shiba House, their base of operations and use the kanji-based power called Symbol Power, which is passed down from one generation to the next. Symbol Power allows them to turn thoughts into power and summon various objects.

Once becoming a Ranger, they must stay clear of their friends and family to keep them safe from becoming a target of the Nighloks. The Shiba House is protected by special Defensive Symbols to keep the Rangers safe. They use a Gap Sensor to detect the presence of a Nighlok and its whereabouts.

The Rangers all carry "Spin Swords" that can utilize Samurai Disks. When a disk is attached to it, the Spin Sword acts as a praxinoscope and it powers up depending on the disk itself. The Spin Swords can be transformed into each of the Rangers signature weapon. When the Rangers summon their Zords, each Spin Sword transforms into a "Mega Blade". In the Zords’ cockpit, the Mega Rangers fold their Mega Blade and insert it and attach the standard Samurai Disk to the piloting system.

The Gold Ranger has a personally unique weapon: The Barracuda Blade, which acts similar to the spins swords in the sense that it can also utilize Samurai disks. Because the Gold Ranger does not have his own Spin Sword, he instead sheaths his Barracuda Blade, sets it aside and summons a Mega Blade once he has summoned his Zords.

Upon entering battle, the team morphs by calling "Go, Go Samurai!" and writing their respective Ranger symbol with their morphers: The Samuraizers. The Gold Ranger has a unique Morphing call and instead states "Samurai Morpher, Gold Power!" After morphing the whole group then states their motto "Rangers Together, Samurai Forever!".

=== Jayden Shiba ===
Jayden Shiba is a young man directly descended from the Shiba family. He was raised since childhood by Mentor Ji after his father gave him the Lion Folding Zord before his final battle. He is the substitute 18th leader of the Samurai Power Rangers. Jayden is generally calm and serious, though he considers others' feelings and is willing to do anything to help his friends.

Jayden is always concerned for the other Rangers, even once attempted to leave and fight alone to put them out of risk and initially refused to allow Antonio to join them for the same reason. His excellent fighting skills make him the target of a mysterious half-Nighlok, half-human warrior named Deker, who wants to find a formidable opponent for his katana Uramasa. It is hinted several times that he is keeping a secret from the other Rangers, which often troubles him but he reminds himself it is for their safety.

Being the only Ranger that can master a special sealing character that can seal away the leader of the Nighloks: Master Xandred, the other Rangers are very protective of him and are often willing to put themselves in harms way for his safety, which constantly troubles him. As the series progress he becomes more open with them and accepts the fact that they are a team.

In a fight against Deker, Deker states that he has become weaker because he relies on his teammates now as opposed to fighting alone as he did previously. Mentor Ji assures him this is not true and that he brings honor to all the Red Rangers before him.

Jayden's secret is finally revealed in the episode "Fight Fire with Fire." Jayden was not the true Red Ranger but was rather standing in for his older sister Lauren, who was sent into hiding as a child to avoid being targeted by the Nighloks as she was the only one who could master the sealing symbol and not Jayden. After Lauren takes her place at the Shiba House as the true Red Ranger, Jayden decides to leave the Shiba House no longer having any purpose there much to the other Rangers dismay. After one final battle with Deker, the other Rangers convince him to return before the reawakening of Master Xandred. After Lauren's Sealing Symbol failed to forever seal away Master Xandred, she relinquishes leadership of the team back to Jayden. Alongside the other Samurai Rangers, Jayden uses Shogun mode to destroy Master Xandred, and then the Samurai Megazord to defeat him for good.

After the final battle, Jayden stays at the Shiba house with Mentor Ji, finally learning to have fun now that his samurai duties are over, with Mentor Ji even giving him a new red colored guitar as a victory gift.

He would later appear to provide assistance to the Power Rangers Super Megaforce, allowing them to make use of the Double Disc to battle an enemy. He and his teammates would then join the army of veteran Rangers who battle alongside the Megaforce Rangers against the Armada.

As the Red Ranger, he is the Samurai of Fire and his personal weapon is the Fire Smasher, with the Bullzooka themed on a bazooka serving as his secondary weapon. The Fire Smasher can enter "Cannon Blast Mode" when using any auxiliary Zord disks. He pilots the Lion Folding Zord, the Tiger Zord, and the Bull Zord. The Lion Disk and the Lightning Disk allow him to use the moves "Blazing Strike" and "Lightning Fury" respectively. When both Disks are used in combination with two Spin Swords, Jayden can use the "Blazing Storm" attack. He can use the Black Box to access his Super Mode or the Shark Disk to access Shark Attack Mode. When piloting a zord he morphs into his Mega Mode form. He will morph into Super Mega Mode or Mega Shark Mode if he was in Super Mode or Shark Attack mode prior to morphing. Using the Shogun Buckle he can access Shogun Mode.

Jayden Shiba is portrayed by Alex Heartman. As a child, he is portrayed by George Beca.

=== Kevin ===
Kevin is a young man who gave up his dream of swimming in the Olympics to become the Blue Samurai Ranger. Due to his strict upbringing, he is extremely enthusiastic and takes his Ranger duties very seriously. His fierce loyalty and enthusiasm brings much comic relief. He lives a very disciplined lifestyle and is never late due to his self-planned daily training schedule. Kevin is also the engineer behind many of the Samurai Combinations, having figured out how to combine the Samurai Battlewing with the Megazord. He was initially unreceptive towards Antonio, as he felt Antonio was not a true Samurai and was "just goofing around" but after seeing Antonio's dedication, he finally accepted him as a true Samurai, and they became actual best friends for real.

Kevin is the closest in terms of skill to Jayden. As such Kevin is typically the one to lead the other Rangers in Jayden's absence. He also appreciates Mike's creativity, however the Green Ranger's lazy nature tends to annoy him. Nevertheless, the two of them work well as a team. After the final battle, Kevin goes back to his swimming career, planning to train for the Olympic qualifying tournament.

Like the other Rangers, he later appeared as part of the Ranger Army in Super Megaforce where they helped the Megaforce Rangers fight the Armada.

As the Blue Ranger, he is the Samurai of Water and his personal weapon is the Hydro Bow themed on a yumi. He pilots the Dragon Folding Zord and the Swordfish Zord. The Dragon Disk allows him to use his signature move "Dragon Splash". He can also use the Swordfish Disk with his Hydro Bow to fire a special healing mist.

He can use the Black Box to access his Super Mode or the Shark Disk to access Shark Attack Mode. When piloting a zord he morphs into his Megamode form. He will morph into Super Mega Mode or Mega Shark Mode if he was in Super Mode or Shark Attack mode prior to morphing. Using the Shogun Buckle he can access Shogun Mode.

Kevin is portrayed by Najee De-Tiege.

=== Mia Watanabe ===
Mia Watanabe is a strong-willed girly-girl who acts as the big sister to the team. She loves children and worked at an orphanage prior to becoming the Pink Samurai Ranger. Though she is a terrible cook (none of the Rangers can stomach her cooking except for Lauren), Mia tries her best in order to achieve her dreams and she thinks her cooking is brilliant. Mia's maturity brings the team together and comforts any one of them that's feeling down. She also acts as an idol to Emily, who wants to be more like her. She is the second ranger to access Super Samurai mode and shogun mode after Jayden.

It is later revealed that she has a younger brother named Terrence who she calls Terry for short, and also that she is a singer. She was somewhat sympathetic towards Dayu after she witnessed the tragic events that befell Dayu but then later develops a strong hatred of her after Dayu attacked Emily while Mia was trying to reason with her. After the final battle, Mia enrolls in a culinary academy, much to the others' relief.

She would later join the Rangers in Super Megaforce who united to face the final attack of the Warstar Armada.

As the Pink Ranger, she is the Samurai of Sky and her personal weapon is the Sky Fan themed on a tessen. She pilots the Turtle Folding Zord. The Turtle Disk allows her to use her signature move "Airway." She can use the Black Box to access her Super Mode or the Shark Disk to access Shark Attack Mode. When piloting a zord she morphs into her Megamode form. She will morph into Super Mega Mode or Mega Shark Mode if she was in Super Mode or Shark Attack Mode, prior to morphing. Using the Shogun Buckle, she can access Shogun Mode.

Mia is portrayed by Erika Fong.

=== Mike ===
Mike is an avid video gamer and the lazy rebel of the group. He is very close friends with Kevin and Emily. Mike also wants to be as strong as Jayden and therefore sometimes trains rigorously to improve his skills.

Being the slacker of the group, he is very irresponsible and once skipped out on training when he felt that he was not doing well to hang out with his old friends. He can also be somewhat cocky and tends to joke around, but he is kind and usually means well. While Mike is not as skilled as Jayden and Kevin, Mike is very crafty and tricky sometimes outwitting what would otherwise be a difficult enemy. His creativity is what allows him to defeat tough opponents.

He often clashes with Kevin; however they are still the best of friends. He respects Kevin's stronger technique but will often deny it. Mentor Ji had trouble training him at first due to his lifestyle, but later they become more cooperative and Mike improves his Symbol Power, allowing him to access the powers of the Beetle Disk.

Throughout the series, it is hinted that Mike has feelings for Emily. This is confirmed when, by the final episode, they are now in a relationship and Mike plans to travel with Emily back to her home to help care for her sister.

In Super Megaforce, Mike is among the Rangers who assist the Megaforce Rangers in the final battle against the Warstar Armada.

As the Green Ranger, he is the Samurai of the Forest and his personal weapon is the Forest Spear themed on a yari. He pilots the Bear Folding Zord and the Beetle Zord. The Bear Disk allows him to use his signature move "Forest Vortex". He can also use the Beetle Disk with his Forest Spear to extend its range and power. He can use the Black Box to access his Super Mode or the Shark Disk to access Shark Attack Mode. When piloting a zord he morphs into his Megamode form. He will morph into Super Mega Mode or Mega Shark Mode if he was in Super Mode or Shark Attack mode prior to morphing. Using the Shogun Buckle he can access Shogun Mode.

Mike is portrayed by Hector David, Jr, who was one of the handful of veteran Ranger actors to appear in the Super Megaforce finale.

=== Emily ===
Emily is a tomboy and a country girl and the youngest member of the team who becomes the Yellow Samurai Ranger. She is close to her older sister Serena who had been training to be the Yellow Samurai Ranger. When Serena became ill, Emily stepped up to take her place. Emily is deeply respectful of Jayden and wants to help the team. When Antonio first came back to Panorama City Emily was the one who was willing to accept him the most and thought that he should join the team after he saved the Rangers from Vulpes. She and Antonio had a friendship; when he ripped his pants with a fishing hook in front of her while wearing a suit, she giggled and found the situation amusing. Mia and Emily are there and uncontrollably laugh at the sight of his underwear, when his fishing hook gets caught on his underwear and he turns around and they see it.

As a child Emily was severely bullied, and as a result she has rather low self-esteem, often putting herself down and saying she is clumsy and not fit to be a Ranger. Emily used an old saying "Sticks and stones may break my bones, but words will never hurt me" to help her get through her childhood. She can also be seen playing a flute, due to her sister playing a flute to make her feel better every time someone picked on her. She idolizes Mia and strives to become more like her. As the series progresses, she becomes more confident and braver and no longer doubts herself or her abilities. It is occasionally implied that she reciprocates Mike's feelings for her. After the final battle, Emily goes back home to care for her sister, along with Mike, with whom she is now in a relationship.

In Super Megaforce, Emily is among the Rangers who help the Megaforce Rangers in the epic battle against the War star Armada.

As the Yellow Ranger, she is the Samurai of Earth and her personal weapon is the Earth Splicer themed after a shuriken. She pilots the Ape Folding Zord. The Ape Disk allows her to use her signature move "Seismic Swing." She can use the Black Box to access her Super Mode or the Shark Disk to access Shark Attack Mode. When piloting a zord she morphs into her Megamode form. She will morph into Super Mega Mode or Mega Shark Mode if she was in Super Mode or Shark Attack Mode prior to morphing. Using the Shogun Buckle she can access Shogun Mode.

Emily is portrayed by Brittany Anne Pirtle, who later returned for the Super Megaforce finale as part of the veteran ranger army. As a child, she is portrayed by Lara Hodgson.

=== Antonio Garcia ===
Antonio Garcia is a fisherman and the tech wizard of the group. He happened to be a childhood friend of Jayden, training alongside him and receiving the Octozord from him and making a promise to aid him as a Samurai. He is considered to be Jayden's opposite, being hyperactive and expressive as Jayden is reserved and stoic. He is the only Ranger who is not of Samurai descent and of non Samurai lineage.

With his technological skills he created his own Morpher out of a trashed cellphone and by reverse engineering the Octozord. He also developed a way to channel symbol power through texting on his Morpher which allowed him to communicate with the Octozord. He is a very skilled cook, primarily with sea food, and will regularly prepare meals for the team. He is also shown to be a very skilled singer and guitar player.

When Antonio first appears, he saves the other Rangers from the Nighlok Vulpes. In the subsequent episode, he explains his past and his intent to join the team. However, Ji initially refuses to let Antonio join on the grounds that he lacks the proper training and discipline, and Jayden sides with this decision out of concern for Antonio's safety. However, when the Rangers are completely overpowered by the Nighlok Steeleto, they reconsider and allow Antonio to join, with Antonio's powers they are able to defeat Steeleto and Antonio develops a friendship with Mike, Emily, Kevin, and Mia, having already been friends with Jayden since their childhood. After joining the team, he used his tech skills he repair the Claw Zord and unlock both the Black Box and The Light Zord. After the final battle, Antonio goes on a global cruise ship fishing expedition.

He would later appear in Super Megaforce alongside his teammates as part of an army who came to the aid of the Megaforce Rangers.

In "The Rescue," Antonio and Mentor were captured by an army of Moogers to lead the other rangers into a Mooger trap. While captured, Ji admits to Antonio that he thought he was trouble and a hindrance and was going to jeopardize their missions because of his facetious and jovial personality, but after seeing all the contributions Antonio brought to the team, (programming the ClawZord, Black Box, and LightZord) he is now glad he is a part of the team and fully accepts him as a Samurai Ranger.

As the Gold Ranger, he is the Samurai of Light and his personal weapon is the Barracuda Blade (a wakizashi that he uses in his high speed slash attacks, reminiscent of Iaido). The Barracuda Blade's special attack is the "Barracuda Bite", which slashes an enemy multiple times with energy strikes at incredible speeds. He pilots the Octo Zord and the Claw Zord. He also controls the Light Zord as his secondary weapon which can also be enlarged to fight alongside the Megazord. The Light Zord's Signature move is the "Scattershot." The kanji on the LightZord's abdomen is "侍", which translates to "Samurai".

Antonio returns in Super Ninja Steel.

Antonio is portrayed by Steven Skyler. As a child, Antonio is portrayed by Connor Kerrigan. Voiced by Jeremy Birchall in the Clash of the Red Rangers: The Movie. (Note: Antonio Garcia is portrayed by Jeremy Birchall (voice only) during this episode as Steven Skyler is absent during filming.)

=== Lauren Shiba ===
Lauren Shiba is Jayden's older sister and the true 18th leader of the Samurai Power Rangers. As the head of the Shiba House, Lauren is the actual Ranger who can master the special Sealing Symbol, passed down from previous generations and thus has a much stronger fire power. Because of this, she stayed in hiding while Jayden took her place to draw the Nighloks attention away from her. When she finally masters the Sealing Symbol that can defeat Master Xandred, she returns to the team. However, she did not appear with the team when they joined the veteran Ranger army in Super Megaforce.

She is kind and friendly to others, and a bit more open unlike Jayden. She cares deeply for her younger brother and was saddened by his departure from the team like the other Rangers. She is the only Ranger who enjoys Mia's cooking, much to the other Rangers' amazement.

As the true Red Ranger, she possesses all the same weapons and powers as Jayden, and her fighting skills are greater than Jayden's and has greater fire Symbol Power than her brother. She pilots the Lion Folding Zord as well as all of Jayden's other Zords.

Lauren uses the older version of the Samuraizer (originally her father's) which has a brush mode for writing Kanji as opposed to the modern versions which have LEDs instead.

During the Shattered Grid storyline in Boom! Studios comics, when all of Ranger history was attacked by Lord Drakkon, an evil alternate version of Tommy Oliver, Lauren was the sole survivor of the Samurai Rangers, retreating into the past to join the original Power Rangers as they fought against Drakkon. In the process, she briefly formed a relationship with Jason Lee Scott, the original Red Ranger and leader of the forces arrayed against Drakkon, but this relationship was erased when Drakkon's final defeat undid his entire invasion.

Lauren Shiba is portrayed by Kimberley Crossman.

== Allies ==
=== Mentor Ji ===
Mentor Ji is the Rangers' sensei who helps them in their samurai training and provides the team with information on their enemies. He raised Jayden from a young age and trained him to take arms as the Red Samurai Ranger. Like the rangers, he can use symbol power to perform various tasks.

In Power Rangers Super Megaforce, he and Jayden later watch the Super Megaforce Rangers in their Megazords fighting Matacore.

Mentor Ji portrayed by Rene Naufahu.

=== Bulk ===
Farkus "Bulk" Bulkmeier, a supporting character from the early years of the franchise, is once again portrayed by Paul Schrier. In his latest misadventure, Bulk becomes inspired by the newest Ranger team to appear and becomes determined to shape Spike, the son of his best friend Skull, into a great Samurai. Unfortunately for Spike, Bulk often deludes himself about his own abilities.

=== Spike Skullovitch ===
Spike Skullovitch (portrayed by Felix Ryan) is the son of Bulk's old friend Eugene "Skull" Skullovitch. He attempts to become a Samurai with Bulk's misguided help, often with failed results. He has a very snorty laugh and also a habit of laughing at inappropriate moments, such as Bulk getting hurt. He also has a crush on Mia the Pink Samurai Ranger and his most prized possession is a stuffed toy panda named Sammy.

=== Mr. Shiba ===
Mr. Shiba is the previous Red Ranger before Jayden. In his last few moments he is able to seal Master Xandred away, but the seal had not been perfected so it was not permanent. He gave Jayden the Lion Folding Zord.

Portrayed by Steven A. Davis.

== Nighloks ==
The Nighloks are vicious demonic beings that reside in the Netherworld and need to bathe in the Sanzu River's waters once in a while or else they dry up. Their goal is to flood the Sanzu River with the negative emotions of humankind and into the crevice from the Netherworld to the Earth.

=== Master Xandred ===
Master Xandred is the Vaiśravaṇa/Japanese spiny lobster-themed leader of the Nighloks and is armed with a broadsword. The most powerful of the Nighlok, Xandred is prone to frequent violent outbursts, usually directed at the failure of his subordinates to destroy the Rangers. He seeks to cause the Sanzu River to flood with the despair of humans, allowing him to enter the world of the living and conquer it. His rage was originally endless until he heard the sound of Dayu's Harmonium.

Master Xandred was sealed within the Netherworld years ago in a battle with the last team of Samurai Rangers led by Jayden's father, who perished after using his symbol power to imprison Xandred. Xandred possesses enormous strength and power, easily able to overpower the Samurai Rangers in their first encounter, and is proven to be a capable swordsman. Power energy radiates from his body that can sometimes incapacitate him but has also been shown to create new Moogers and Spitfangs. However he displays a number of fatal weakness as well. Because of the (incomplete) seal that the original Red Ranger placed on him, Xandred's power is not at its peak. Not only that but he constantly suffers from a headache that only Octoroo's sake-like medicine and the music from Dayu's harmonium are able to soothe. Like other Nighlok, Xandred's body dries out if he is not in the Netherworld, although he dries out much faster than any other Nighlok (whether or not this is a result of the seal on him, it is never stated) and it takes longer for the Sanzu River's polluted water to soak back into Xandred's body.

In "The Master Returns," Xandred gets even more angry than before after he is told by Octoroo of Serrator's betrayal. He plans to go to Earth through a gap. Though Octoroo advises him not to, Xandred makes his return to Earth planning to destroy Serrator along with the Samurai Rangers. Instantly Xandred starts to dry up, but he fights the Rangers anyway and completely overpowers them. Jayden goes to take him on with his Bullzooka, but Xandred manages to block all the shots. He is able to defeat Jayden even in Super Samurai Mode, leaving him badly hurt and unable to stand up. Afterwards, Xandred repairs and gives Dayu back her harmonium. Xandred is about to completely dry up when Octoroo brings him into the Netherworld to rejuvenate, sinking to the bottom of the Sanzu River. This ends up giving Serrator the opportunity to take over Xandred's ship and split world in two.

In "Evil Reborn," the result of Mia destroying Dayu's Harmonium is enough to raise the Sanzu River and fully heal Master Xandred as he appears on Earth to confront the Rangers.

In "The Sealing Symbol," Xandred states that with his power renewed, he is unstoppable. When Dayu is starting to succumb to her injuries, Xandred puts her out of his misery and assumes a stronger form. While Lauren writes the Sealing Symbol, the other Samurai Rangers fight Xandred to keep him from attacking Lauren. Xandred moves fast enough to knock the Rangers down as the Samurai Rangers work to keep Xandred from attacking Lauren. When Lauren writes the Sealing Symbol and fires it towards Xandred, it has no effect on Xandred as he emerges with a white patch that represented Dayu's human side that keeps him from drying out and immunizes the Sealing Symbol as well. Xandred attacks the Samurai Rangers as Jayden uses a teleportation symbol to get the Samurai Rangers away from Xandred. Xandred then takes a kimono that Dayu had dropped and retreats back to the Netherworld.

After Octoroo holds a brief memorial for Dayu, Xandred states that she has served her purpose and that it is time to invade Earth. He begins the invasion on Earth by unleashing the waters of the Sanzu River upon the Earth. Xandred tells Octoroo that they have yet to defeat the Samurai Rangers. Xandred confronts the Rangers during their fight with an army of Moogers. Jayden plans to attack the white spot on Xandred that Dayu's humanity is on while the other Samurai Rangers fight the Moogers and the Spitfangs. Jayden uses his Super Spin Sword on the white patch but Xandred states that he cannot be defeated that easily. Xandred then uses his Netherwind attack and the Flames of the Netherworld to take down the Rangers. Xandred is surprised the Rangers will not beg for mercy, even in defeat so he plans to go after Lauren expecting them to beg for her.

In the final episode "Samurai Forever," the Rangers chase him down and attack him with everything they have. Jayden then uses the Second Shiba Fire Disk as their trump card. Jayden finally destroys Xandred as the Red Shogun Ranger, but Xandred returned in the form of a Mega Monster.

Xandred manages to repel the Beetlezord, Swordfishzord, Tigerzord, Octozord, Clawzord, Bullzord and the Samurai Shield until only the Samurai Megazord was left standing. The Rangers put all the symbol power they have left into one final strike which slashes Xandred in half. In his final moments before his destruction, Xandred brags to the Rangers that they may have beaten him, but the Nighloks will rise again one day.

Voiced by Jeff Szusterman.

=== Dayu ===
Dayu (formerly known as Dahlia) is one of Master Xandred's two followers, a female Benzaiten/sea slug/Futakuchi-onna-themed figure with a shamisen. Before becoming a Nighlok, she was a human who was a newlywed to Deker. But a fire (implying to have been set up purposely by Serrator) burned their house down and injured Deker leaving him with moments left to live. A mysterious Nighlok appeared (later revealed to be Serrator) who offered Deker's life back in exchange for her humanity. When she accepted the deal, Deker indeed lived on but as half-human, half-Nighlok with no memory of Dayu. Dayu then became a Nighlok herself with only her shamisen (which was once her decorative lute) by her side to remind her of her past. Of all the villains, Dayu is the only one who cannot let go of her past once making an attempt to reclaim it by kidnapping brides and using their tears to create a wedding dress. Her plan failed due to the Rangers' interference, though she is saved by Deker. She is a powerful fighter as she took down both Kevin and Mia at once. Her shamisen (which she calls her "Harmonium") has a hidden short sword in the neck which she uses for battle. She has a habit throwing the baki of her instrument at Nighloks' she gets angry at. In "Broken Dreams," Master Xandred was getting tired of Dayu's failure and breaks her shamisen causing her to go to the human world and fix it with a musician. Mia pursues Dayu only for them to be put under a sleeping spell by Rhinosnorus. Mia witnesses Dayu's past in a nightmare. After the sleeping spell wore off, Dayu attacked Mia (who wanted to help Dayu after what she saw) only to retreat when Emily arrived. In "The Ultimate Duel," Dayu meets with Deker before his duel with Jayden. Around the time when the Black Box was completed as seen in "Super Samurai," Dayu abandons Master Xandred and Octoroo and goes into the human world. In "Trading Places," Dayu meets with an outcast Furry Wart on a river stream where she plans to find a way to end Master Xandred's life for casting her out and breaking her harmonium.

In "Kevin's Choice," Dayu finds the part of Deker's sword and is approached by Serrator who offers to fix Dayu's harmonium in exchange for the info on where Deker is. While the two talked, it was revealed Serrator was the one who turned Deker into a half-human/half-Nighlok. Dayu is wondering if Serrator is lying until she finds Deker in the forest. Dayu learns from Deker that his sword Uramasa had taken the blow in the fight against Jayden. She and Deker crash the battle between the Power Rangers and Skarf where they attack Skarf in order to unleash Skarf's true power.

In "A Sticky Situation," Dayu receives a special dagger from Serrator.

In "The Master Returns," Dayu states her unhappiness with how long Serrator is taking to fix her Harmonium. Soon after Serrator heads to a cliff, Dayu senses her Harmonium presence and heads after Serrator. After she manages to catch up with Serrator, she fights him only to be knocked down by Serrator. After Master Xandred returns to Earth, he fixes Dayu's Harmonium and Dayu swears her loyalty once again to Master Xandred.

In "A Stroke of Fate," Dayu tries to convince Deker not to trust Serrator and Antonio begs him to reconsider his role in the battle between Humans and Nighloks following him remembering his memories. Yet Dayu was unable to convince Deker to not trust Serrator.

In "Fight Fire with Fire," Dayu returns to Master Xandred's ship and speaks with Octoroo a plan to ambush the Power Ranger. Dayu and Octoroo send Fiera to help take down the Red Ranger. Dayu and Octoroo were surprised that the Fire Flashers did not fully consume Jayden and suspect that Jayden is not the head of the Shiba Clan.

In "Evil Reborn," Dayu senses the fight between Deker and Jayden. Dayu then senses that Deker is gone as Octoroo tells her to play her Harmonium to help recharge Master Xandred. Dayu declares that her Nighlok fate is sealed and that she has nothing left to lose as she unleashes the Moogers and some giant Moogers on the marina. Dayu then plays the Harmonium as Mia confronts her. Mia ends up slashing Dayu and her Harmonium where the Harmonium's destruction ends up unleashing a lot of misery which is enough to restore Master Xandred. Dayu then tells Master Xandred that she always pays her debts.

In "The Sealing Symbol," an injured Dayu collapses on Master Xandred stating that she played it for Deker and that it was the end of her sadness. Dayu stated that she was not truly a Nighlok. Master Xandred puts Dayu out of her misery as he absorbs Dayu's human half to serve as his defense against the Sealing Symbol and keep him from drying out. All left of her was her kimono, which is thrown to the Sanzu River by Master Xandred. Dayu was presumably reunited with Deker in the afterlife.

Dayu is voiced by Kate Elliott in Nighlok form and Dahlia is portrayed by Rugen Du Bray.

=== Octoroo ===
Octoroo is an elderly Fukurokuju/squid-themed figure with a staff who is one of Master Xandred's two followers. He is usually reading old books, mixing Master Xandred's medicine, or checking the water level of the river. Everyone, including Master Xandred, calls him "Noodle-Face." Despite his small form, he is powerful enough to take on the Gold Ranger. He also seems to be highly skilled in black magic and a gifted potioneer, as he is easily able to poison the Red Ranger singlehandedly. Like Dayu and Serrator, he seems to be able to stay in the human world indefinitely without drying out. Octoroo usually begins his sentences with the exclamation "Ooh ah ooh!" and he has a habit of speaking in rhyme. Octoroo is often teased by his peers for his unusual appearance and the dislike seems to be mutual as he has shown annoyance toward the Nighlok monsters and is distrustful of Deker. The only exceptions being Master Xandred, whom he is very loyal to, and Dayu, whom Octoroo seems to care about and actually admits being saddened by her passing.

In "Fight Fire with Fire," Dayu and Octoroo send Fiera to help take down the Red Ranger and Octoroo give her Fire Flashers in order to fight fire with fire. Dayu and Octoroo were surprised that the Fire Flashers did not fully consume Jayden and suspect that Jayden is not the true head of the Shiba Clan.

In the episode "The Great Duel" Octoroo gave half of his life source to Gigertox to prepare him for battle.

In "Samurai Forever", Octoroo is seen on Xandred's ship as it sinks into the Sanzu River following Xandred's destruction.

Voiced by Jeff Szusterman.

=== Deker ===
Deker is a mysterious Shōjō/skeleton-themed Nighlok swordsman who does not remember his past and is cursed into finding the ideal opponent to duel. He is armed with the katana Uramasa and called by Xandred as the Cursed Warrior due to being half-human. Deker was once married to Dayu before becoming half-human. As a human, he was a samurai and was given the blade Uramasa by Dayu. But when a house fire almost kills him, Dayu surrendered her humanity to Serrator to revive him. However this erased his memory and turned him half-human half-Nighlok cursed to forever wander with a thirst for battle. Due to being a half-human, Deker has the ability to assume human form and transverse between the Netherworld and the land of the living without relying on the Sanzu River for survival. He considers the Red Ranger to be his greatest challenge since Uramasa's blade became radiant.

In "Boxed In," Deker claims that the Ultimate Duel might free him from his Nighlok half. Deker is able to remember his past as Dayu's husband. In "The Ultimate Duel," Deker duels with Jayden while the others fought Rhinosnorus. Eventually, Jayden allows Deker to injure him allowing him to get close enough to finish Deker off. Deker's sword Uramasa is broken and half of it gets struck into the ground nearby. Deker thanks Jayden for the Ultimate Duel before vanishing in a puff of smoke while falling off the cliff.

In "Kevin's Choice", Dayu finds a piece of Uramasa as Serrator arrives to prevent Dayu from throwing the broken part away. Dayu later finds Deker alive in the forest. Deker tells Dayu that Uramasa took the damage for him as she tells him about Serrator's offer. With a backup sword, Deker joins Dayu into attacking the Rangers where Deker fights Jayden stating that he is now a "sword for hire" ever since Uramasa broke. Deker and Dayu then attack Skarf in order to unleash Skarf's true power.

In "Trust Me", Deker accompanies Serrator and Dayu to Monalua, where they use a special ash to make its inhabitants paranoid. Deker fights Jayden and Mia, where Deker defeats them and states that Jayden has become weaker for relying on his teammates to help him than fighting him solo. Following Malden's destruction, Jayden uses his Bullzooka when confronted by Deker who asks if Jayden has stated fighting with blasters now. After Jayden destroys the fires spreading the ash and lifting the paranoia spell, Deker was prepared to fight Jayden only for Serrator to tell him that he has bigger plans for him. Deker than leaves with Serrator and Dayu as Serrator summons a Papyrox and two giant Spitfangs to cover their escape.

In the episode "A Crack in the World", Serrator refuses to give back Uramasa straight away. Serrator reveals his plans to Deker and promises him he will be free of his curse if he helps him.

In the following episode "A Stroke of Fate," Deker returns to the ruins of his home as he begins to remember some of his memories. Dayu tries to convince him not to trust Serrator and Antonio begs him to reconsider his role in the battle between Humans and Nighloks, to no avail. Once Deker reobtains Uramasa, he betrays Serrator and strikes him down, leaving the Rangers to finish him off for good.

In "The Great Duel," Deker challenges Jayden to the Ultimate Duel once more after Jayden leaves the Shiba House. In "Evil Reborn," Deker and Jayden duel on horseback as Jayden successfully defeats Deker. With both combatants weakened, Deker rises and finds himself too tired to lift Uramasa. Deker then starts hallucinating where he sees Dayu in human form, telling him that she does not want to lose him again. Deker then charges towards Jayden only for Deker to be taken down by Kevin. Before disintegrating, Deker declares himself free. It is presumed that he and Dayu were reunited in the afterlife.

Deker is portrayed by Ricardo Medina, Jr. (as Rick Medina).

=== Serrator ===
Serrator is an Ebisu/shachihoko-themed Nighlok with six slit eyes and a rictus grin. He can teleport, emit electricity, elongate his claw, and wields a weaponized Shaku in combat. In "The Tengen Gate," he was referred to as the Nighlok King. He was responsible for cursing Deker by turning him into a human/Nighlok hybrid and turning Dayu into a Nighlok as seen in "Broken Dreams" where his shadowed astral appearance appeared before Dayu's human form agreeing to save Deker's life in exchange for Dayu's humanity.

Serrator officially debuted in "Something Fishy" where he had been at the bottom of the Sanzu River and was revived by Master Xandred's recent power surge. He arrives aboard Master Xandred's ship to offer his services and revealing himself to be the one who sent Switchbeast. He shows off his heightened powers by obliterating an army of Moogers with a single blast and manages to convince a skeptical Master Xandred of his loyalty and asks for permission to enter the human world to scare enough humans to flood the river. Once on Earth, he introduces himself to the Rangers, and during their battle seems to have the Rangers beat, with all of the weapons they wielded unable to affect him. Serrator even cuts a piece of paper into a shape and creates Papyrox from it. In the nick of time, Antonio arrives and manages to use the Lightzord to successfully damage Serrator. Serrator then leaves commenting that the Rangers had "passed the test" for now.

In the episode "He Ain't Heavy Metal, He's My Brother", Octoroo criticizes Serrator for failing. Briefly after this, Serrator goes to attack the city again only to be met by the Rangers. He overpowers the Rangers again. Just as he is about to finish them off, Mia arrives only to be knocked down by Serrator. Jayden then passes Mia the Black Box allowing her to go into Super Samurai Mode. She manages to damage Serrator using her Super Airway Finisher. Before retreating, Serrator creates another Papyrox which is accompanied by some Giant Moogers and two Giant Spitfangs.

In the episode "Kevin's Choice," Serrator appears before Dayu to prevent here from disposing the half of Uramasa that was broken during Jayden and Deker's battle. Serrator then makes a deal with Dayu, offering to fix her Harmounium and Uramasa as long as she help him. It was revealed Serrator was the one who turned Deker into a half-human/half-Nighlok. He has Dayu send the message to Deker who Dayu had no idea was still alive. He instructs Dayu and Deker to crash the battle between the Rangers and Skarf and unleash Skarf's true power.

In "A Sticky Situation," Serrator catches up to Deker and Dayu as Deker asks about him fixing Uramasa. Serrator gives Dayu a special dagger and tells Deker that he will play a part in mankind's destruction.

In "The Master Returns," Master Xandred learns of Serrator's secret plans and goes to Earth to deal with him. When Serrator is taking too long to get back to Dayu on repairing her Harmonium, she ends up confronting him which leads to an altercation where Serrator defeats Dayu. Luckily for Dayu, Master Xandred arrives and repairs Dayu's Harmonium upon reclaiming it from Serrator who flees. When Master Xandred is placed in the depths of the Sanzu River to recuperate, Serrator takes over his ship with no opposition.

Serrator's plan is finally revealed in the episode "A Crack in The World" where Kevin notices how all his attacks form a straight line on the map. Serrator reveals during his next attack his true motives are to crack open the Earth so that the entire Sanzu River floods in, trapping Master Xandred in the Nether Worlds and heightening Serrators power to the point where he is equal to none. This will allow him to become the ruler of both worlds as well as create a new domain of his own.

To finally complete the spell starting in "A Crack in the World," he needed Deker to break the final point with his sword Uramasa. Serrator claimed that in doing so, Deker would also be free from his curse.

In "A Stroke of Fate," Serrator then plans to have Deker claim his prize in order for him to rip open the Earth. Serrator fights with Jayden, Mia, and Emily until Deker appears and Serrator gives Deker Uramasa in order to slash the barrier so that Deker can be free. Serrator is then betrayed by Deker at the last minute where he slashes Uramasa as Deker only worked with Serrator to get Uramasa fixed. Knowing his plans are ruined after the holes to the Netherworld close up, Serrator goes into an enraged fury before battling the Rangers once more. After taking a hit from the Bullzooka and the Cannon Strike attack, they defeat Serrator. Serrator then grows as the Rangers summon the Megazords. The Bull Megazord and the Light Megazord fights with Serrator while the Samurai Megazord and the Claw Armor Megazord to fight the two Papyrox. After the two Papyrox were destroyed by the Samurai Megazord and the Claw Armor Megazord, they help the Bull Megazord by combining the Zords into the Samurai Gigazord to fight Serrator and managed to strike him. The Gigazord uses the Shogun Strike on Serrator which he catches. Jayden then summons the Shark Zord which combines with the Samurai Gigazord. The Samurai Gigazord then uses the Ultimate Samurai Slash on Serrator. Before he succumbs to his injuries, Serrator exclaims that he was supposed to split open their world, not get split in half himself.

Voiced by Derek Judge.

=== Professor Cog ===
Professor Cog is a cog-themed robot with a wrench for a right arm and a screwdriver for a left arm who comes from the alternate future of Power Rangers RPM. He can attack with Electro-Turbines and Hypno-Bolts. He and an army of Grinders escaped to the Samurai Rangers' reality to seek help from Master Xandred in order to level up and collect some of the water of the Sanzu River for his boss Venjix. He says that he will help them in exchange for taking down the Samurai Rangers. With this plan, Professor Cog plans to wipe out the last people in his reality by poisoning them with the Sanzu water. RPM Ranger Scott Truman followed Professor Cog to the Samurai Rangers' reality. When Professor Cog attacks Scott, the Samurai Rangers joined the fight. Professor Cog then sends the other Samurai Rangers into a vortex leading to Professor Cog's reality while Professor Cog's Hypno-Bolts start to kick in on both Red Rangers causing them to fight. When the Hypno-Bolts kick in, Professor Cog and Sergeant Tread watch Jayden and Scott duel each other. After the effects of the Hypno-Bolts were negated thanks to Mentor giving them a special seal, Jayden and Scott then fought Professor Cog, who sends Sergeant Tread to attack. After knocking down Sergeant Tread, Jayden and Scott fight Professor Cog until the other Rangers returned. With help from the other Samurai Rangers, Scott Truman and Jayden managed to destroy Professor Cog and Sergeant Tread.

In the Super Megaforce season, a rebuilt Professor Cog appears (with his arms now flipped) and tricks the Megaforce Rangers into going to the RPM universe's Cornith for the Falcon Zord, while he leads his Grinders to their universe's version of earth to conquer it. Unfortunately, Professor Cog meets resistance from Prince Vekar's Armada, who are also trying to conquer earth, before being destroyed again by the Megaforce Rangers.

Professor Cog is voiced by Cameron Rhodes.

=== Furry Warts ===
The Furry Warts are a yellow furred ball-like Susuwatari settling in roof of Xandred's Junk. They attempt to be annoyingly repeating people's words while giggling.

In "Trading Places," a Furry Wart was cast out by Master Xandred and found on the river stream by Dayu, and appeared throughout the rest of the series, until the end, when it is stepped on by Master Xandred.

=== Moogers ===
The Moogers are the coral/sea anemone-like foot soldiers that serve Master Xandred. They are armed with swords and bows.

There are also Giant Moogers that are used to fight the Zords.

There were also Flying Moogers for aerial attacks which first appear in "Jayden's Challenge" to assist Robtish.

There are other Moogers equipped with blasters, but the even stronger ones are the Master Blasters which have professional hats and take many Moogers to carry starting with "Trust Me."

In "Party Monsters," the Moogers that were slain by the Rangers were shown in the Nighlok Heaven catering the Halloween party that the defeated Nighloks attended.

The Moogers made an appearance at the 2011 Macy's Thanksgiving Day Parade attempting to "kidnap" Al Roker only to be defeated by the Samurai Rangers.

=== Spitfangs ===
The Spitfangs are secondary Nozuchi/Shachihoko-themed foot soldiers that resemble skull-like, eyeless, crocodile-heads with a carp-like body, and crocodile-like arms and legs. They can breathe fire quite readily. Like the Moogers, Spitfangs can be enlarged to fight the Zords. Each Spitfang comes in two different colors: gold and blue.

=== Papyrox ===
The Papyrox are giant origami-based monsters created by Serrator, who carves out their shapes from a piece of paper. The Papyrox are considered to be stronger than the Moogers and the Spitfangs. Some versions of the Papyrox wield double-bladed swords.

=== Nighlok Monsters ===
The Nighlok Monsters are Yōkai-like monsters used by the villains to attack the Human World. They are dependent on waters from the Sanzu River for survival, therefore needing the negative emotions of humans to keep it from drying out. They are trying to expand the Sanzu River to make it flood into the human world so the Nighlok can rule both worlds. All Nighloks have an ability to enter [the living world through cracks and narrow gaps. When a Nighlok is destroyed once, it can grow into a giant Mega-Monster on its own that the Rangers need to use the Megazord to defeat. When a Nighlok is destroyed, it ends up in the Nighlok Heaven as seen in "Party Monsters."

- Tooya (voiced by Wesley Dowdell) - Tooya is an Ōkaburo-themed Nighlok with a second face on his skirt and was the first Nighlok that the Samurai Rangers had fought. He can breathe fire and had twin swords. This monster was destroyed by the Lion Foldingzord.
- Scorpionic (voiced by Phil Brown) – Scorpionic is a Kamaitachi/centipede-themed Nighlok that wears a scorpion-resembling armor. He is armed with a scythe sword and uses his hair to create gust of wind to hit his opponents. This monster was destroyed by the Samurai Megazord.
- Rofer (voiced by Mark Wright) – Rofer is an arrogant Tsuchi-korobi-themed Nighlok who can extend his arms to attack from long distances under the ground. This monster was destroyed by the Samurai Megazord.
- Doubletone (voiced by Gerald Urquhart) – Doubletone is a two-toned Nighlok that is armed with a Bamboo-like spear. His moves are a Tiger Tidal Wave (emitted from the tiger half of his body) and a Sanzu River Tidal Wave (emitted from the Shuihu half of his body). This monster was destroyed by the Samurai Megazord.
- Dreadhead (voiced by Ross Girven) – Dreadhead is a western-accented fusuma/willow-themed Nighlok in dreadlocks who wields a shotgun and is immune to any physical attack. This monster was destroyed by the Beetle Blaster Megazord.
- Negatron (voiced by David Van Horn) – Negatron is a Satori/mushroom-themed Nighlok who uses insults as a weapon. He has three eyes: one on the bottom left, one on the bottom right, and one above them in the center. This monster was destroyed by the Beetle Blaster Megazord.
- Yamiror (voiced by Peter Gentil) – Yamiror is a Kodama/cedar tree-themed Nighlok with a breath that can poison or paralyze others. This monster was destroyed by the Swordfish Fencer Megazord.
- Madimot (voiced by Robert Mignault) – Madimot is a Hitotsume-kozō/oyster-themed Nighlok that wields a large shield with spikes on it. He is also able to shoot dark energy from his face which he uses to control others minds. He gives them commands by cracking his whip. This monster was destroyed by the Tiger Drill Megazord.
- Desperaino (voiced by Peter Gentil) – Desperaino is a Kasa-obake/jellyfish-themed Nighlok who wields an umbrella that summons rain (which can cause the loss of hope) and unfolds his head like an umbrella to fly. This monster was destroyed by the Samurai Battlewing.
- Robtish (voiced by Peter Daube) – Robtish is a powerful Otoroshi-themed Nighlok swordsman with two squinted eyes and red skin, wears a helmet with spikes, and has a fierce grin with fangs and speaks with a Scottish accent. He wields a sword in battle and can unleash a sonic shock wave that is followed up by a Double Slash technique. This monster was destroyed by the Battlewing Megazord.
- Vulpes (voiced by Ari Boyland) – Vulpes is a Tengu/Kitsune-themed Nighlok that has many mirror spells. He can open a portal to reflect back the Rangers sword attacks, can copy their sword slash attack, summon energy crows, and use his Fox Veil to become invisible. This monster was destroyed by the Battlewing Megazord, with help from the Octozord.
- Steeleto (voiced by John Leight) – Steeleto is an Amikiri-themed Nighlok who can attack with his Full-Body Blades attack and can perform the Steel Blade Scatter Shot attack. He is also good friends with Vulpes and attempted to avenge him by destroying the Samurai Rangers. This monster was destroyed by the Octo Spear Megazord.
- Antberry (voiced by Barnie Duncan) – Antberry is a slimy Abura-sumashi-themed Nighlok whose body is full of a slimy substance called Sanzu Slime. This monster was destroyed by the Octo Spear Megazord.
- Splitface (voiced by Simon McKinney) – Splitface is a multi-faced Uwan-themed Nighlok who steals people's spirits as well as split his body parts up to evade attacks. This monster was destroyed by the Claw Battlezord. He is voiced by Simon McKinney.
- Arachnitor (voiced by Simon McKinney) – Arachnitor is an Ushi-oni-themed Nighlok. As punishment for mutinying against him, Xandred powers him up until he mutates into a more powerful mindless monster. This monster was destroyed by the Claw Armor Megazord and the Samurai Battle Cannon.
- Rhinosnorus (voiced by Campbell Cooley) – Rhinosnorus is a Baku-themed Nighlok with a sideways elephant-like head behind his rhinoceros head, tiger and bird head-shaped hands, and bull and snake head-shaped feet. He can emit a sleep-inducing mist from an inducer on his left arm and eat the dreams of his victims. This monster was destroyed by the Samurai Megazord.
- Armadeevil (voiced by Mark Mitchinson) – Armadeevil is a Sazae-oni/armadillo-themed Nighlok with a hard shell. He can roll up into a ball. Armadeevil showed up at Master Xandred's ship after being sent by someone who he keeps anonymous. This monster was destroyed by the Claw Armor Megazord and Samurai Battle Cannon.
- Trickster (voiced by Mark Mitchinson) – Trickster is a Tenome-themed Nighlok that is covered in dice and has eye-mounted hands where his eyes should be. He wields a bladed staff, can trap people in their nightmares which he controls, and emit a Dream Beam. This monster was destroyed by the Claw Armor Megazord.
- Switchbeast (voiced by Dean Young) – Switchbeast is a Kasha/lion-themed Nighlok that is revealed to have been sent by Serrator. He can switch the spirits of anyone and place the original spirits in a different object. This monster was destroyed by the Claw Armor Megazord.
- Sharkjaw (voiced by Dean Young) – Sharkjaw is a Yama-oroshi/shark-themed Nighlok that can spin around into a destructive force. This monster was destroyed by the Samurai Gigazord off-screen some time after "Kevin's Choice." He is voiced by Dean Young.
- General Gut (voiced by John Dybvig) – General Gut is a Budai-themed Nighlok who is one of Master Xandred's best and most loyal warriors. While he possesses super-strength and size-shifting, his giant form has chest laser and a Super-Serpent that emerges from his stomach. This monster was destroyed by the Samurai Shark Megazord.
- Sergeant Tread (voiced by Geoff Dolan) – Sergeant Tread is an Oboroguruma-themed Nighlok with wheels for hands who is one of Master Xandred's best warriors. He is the only Nighlok that lacks a second life.
- Eyescar (voiced by Mark Williams) – Eyescar is a dangerous one-eyed Dorotabō/leech-themed Nighlok. This monster was destroyed by the Claw Battlezord and Samurai Shark Megazord.
- Crustor (voiced by Stephen Brunton) – Crustor is a Raijū/barnacle-themed Nighlok that serves Serrator. He wields a sword in battle and can breathe fire. This monster was destroyed by the Bull Megazord.
- Skarf (voiced by Adam Gardiner) – Skarf is a Nurikabe-themed Nighlok that serves Serrator. He can eat anything with his head-like hands and can also elongate his arms. His second form in Mega-Monster form has his arms converted into two halves of a nearly impenetrable tiki-faced wall shield whose eyes shoot beams. This monster was destroyed by the Samurai Gigazord.
- Duplicator (voiced by Joel Tobeck) – A Kyōkotsu-themed Nighlok that serves Serrator. He can make mirror duplicates of himself. He can also wield a sword and shoot shadow balls. This monster was destroyed by the Claw Armor Megazord and the Light Megazord.
- Grinataur (voiced by Charlie McDermott) – Grinataur is a large-mouthed Preta-themed Nighlok that serves Serrator. He can shoot black sand out of his tongue that can make people hungry and thirsty as well as emitting energy balls. This monster was destroyed by the Samurai Gigazord.
- Epoxar (voiced by Mark Wright) – Epoxar is a Betobeto-san/larva-themed Nighlok that serves Serrator. He is able to shoot a special glue from his shoulder which remains sticky unless if Epoxar is destroyed. This monster was destroyed by the Bull Megazord, the Claw Battlezord and the Light Megazord.
- Maldan (voiced by Michael Morris) – Maldan is a Tsurubebi-themed Nighlok who assisted Master Xandred and Octoroo into testing the Master Blasters for the Moogers. This monster was destroyed by the Bull Megazord and the Samurai Lightzord.
- Pestilox (voiced by John Tui) – Pestilox is a Hitōban-themed Nighlok that serves Serrator. Pestilox had a swarm of flies that caused stomach pain on everyone if they swallowed them and can also emit tentacles. This monster was destroyed by the Claw Armor Megazord and the Samurai Battle Cannon.
- Gred (voiced by James Coleman) – Gred is a red and green Noppera-bō/clown/bell pepper-themed Nighlok with 6 dots for eyes that the Rangers fought on Christmas. This monster was destroyed by the Battlewing Megazord.
- Fiera (voiced by Chelsea McEwan Millar) – Fiera is an Onmoraki-themed Nighlok with a crow head-shaped appendage for a right hand. She has the ability to disappear and appear with ease. This monster was destroyed by the Lion Foldingzord.
- Gigertox (voiced by Paul Harrop) – Gigertox is an Enenra-themed Nighlok with stretchable tentacles that can grab anybody. After being powered up by Octoroo, he gains a third life as a giant snake monster made of a dark mist. His second life was destroyed by the Battlewing Megazord whilst his dark snake form was destroyed by the Samurai Gigazord.
