= Melody Perkins =

American actress, model and dancer

- Occupations: Actress; model; dancer
- Years active: 1995–2004; 2008–present
- Known for: Astronema / Karone in Power Rangers in Space; Karone / Pink Galaxy Ranger in Power Rangers Lost Galaxy Power Rangers Super Megaforce

Melody Perkins is an American actress, model and dancer. She is known for her regular role as the villainess later turned heroine Astronema/Karone in Power Rangers in Space, and became the second Pink Ranger in Power Rangers Lost Galaxy.

== Career ==
As an actress, Perkins's longest-running role was in the Power Rangers franchise. She played the lead villainess Astronema in Power Rangers in Space. She said of the role: "It's fun being the bad girl." Perkins returned as the reformed Karone in Power Rangers Lost Galaxy. She replaced Valerie Vernon (who left to battle leukemia) as the Pink Galaxy Ranger. She is the only person to have played the Power Rangers' arch-enemy in one season and a Power Ranger in the next season. Perkins also voiced a monster in Power Rangers Lightspeed Rescue.

Perkins has also appeared as the babysitter Patty Henderson in Malcolm in the Middle, an evil witch in Charmed, and in episodes of various other series. She has also appeared in a commercial for Allstate Insurance. Perkins retired from acting after she made a brief appearance in an episode of CSI: Miami in 2004.

In 2007, Perkins appeared on a cover for Let's Live magazine.

Perkins has recently returned to acting, reprising her role as Karone in the final episode of Power Rangers Super Megaforce, which aired in November 2014. Along with other past and current Power Rangers cast members, she makes regular appearances at various sci-fi/comic cons.

== Filmography ==
=== Film ===
Year	Title	Role	Notes
2000	Coyote Ugly	New Coyote	Uncredited
2001	Planet of the Apes	Friend at Leo's party	
2015	The Legendary Battle: Extended Edition	Karone / Pink Galaxy Ranger II	TV film; extended episode
2016	Girl Trip	Kate	Short film
2019	The Garageland Chronicles	Frances	Completed

=== Television ===
Year	Title	Role	Notes
1995	High Tide	—N/a	Episode: "The Grind"
1997	Night Man	Lisa	Episode: "Face to Face"
1997	Silk Stalkings	Maid	Episode: "Child's Play"
1998	Power Rangers in Space	Astronema / Karone	Series regular (43 episodes)
1999	Power Rangers Lost Galaxy	Karone / Pink Galaxy Ranger #2 / Astronema	Series regular (14 episodes)
2000	Malcolm in the Middle	Patty Henderson	Episode: "Convention"
2003	Charmed	Margo Stillman	Episode: "The Power of Three Blondes"
2004	CSI: Miami	Barbara Nance	Episode: "Wannabe"
2014	Power Rangers Super Megaforce	Karone / Pink Galaxy Ranger II	Episode: "Legendary Battle"
