= Patricia Ja Lee =

American actress and firefighter

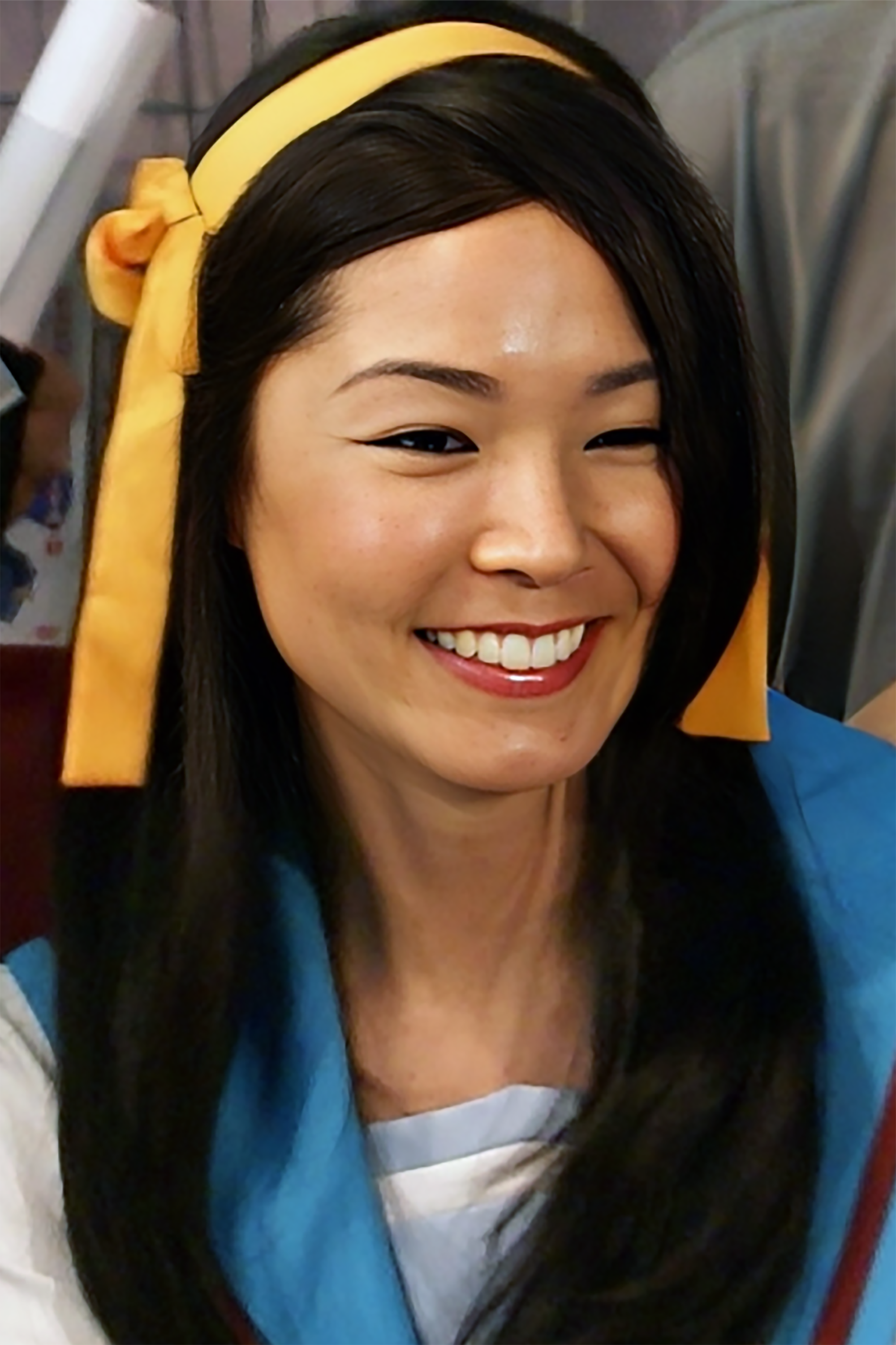
- Lee portraying Haruhi Suzumiya in 2007
- Other name: Pee Jay Lee
- Occupation: Actress
- Years active: 1987–2015; 2019

Patricia Ja Lee is an American actress. She is best known for her roles of Cassie Chan, the Pink Ranger on the television series Power Rangers Turbo and Power Rangers in Space, and as the voice and motion capture actress for Jill Valentine in numerous entries in the Resident Evil franchise of video games. She also portrayed Haruhi Suzumiya in the first season of ASOS Brigade, a series of live-action videos to promote the show.

Aside from her on screen roles, Lee also did voicework in many English dubbed adaptations of Japanese anime.

== Career ==
Lee began acting in 1987, when she was 12 years old. Ten years later, Lee got her breakout role when she landed the role of Cassie Chan, the Pink Ranger for Power Rangers Turbo, a role she would continue to play in Power Rangers in Space. In 1999, she voiced Meifa Puzi in Cowboy Bebop. In 2001, Lee was cast the lead female role in the Golden Harvest action adventure Extreme Challenge.

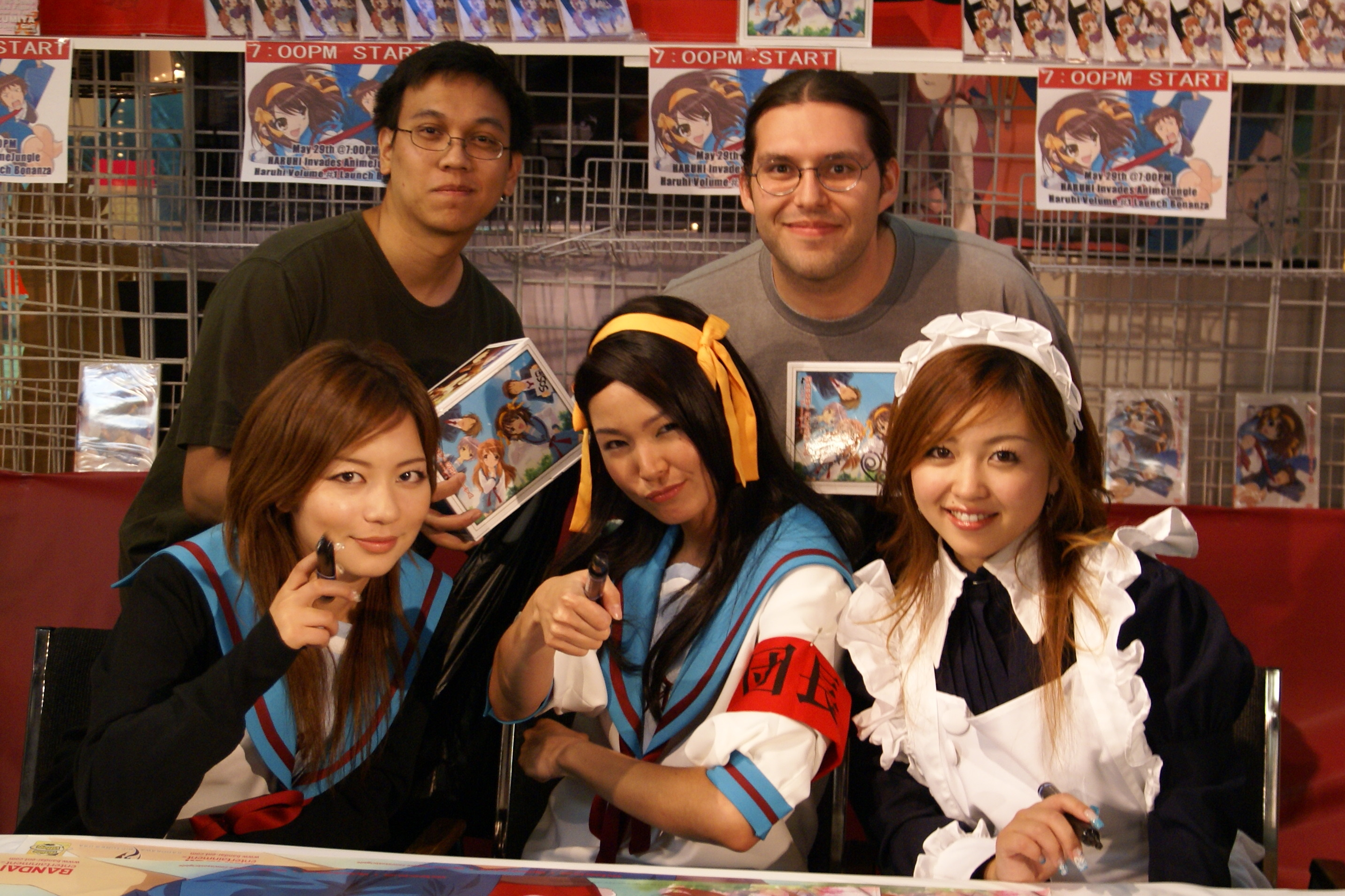
Lee with the cast of ASOS Brigade in 2006

She portrayed Haruhi Suzumiya in the first series of live-action promotional videos launched by Bandai Entertainment on December 22, 2006, to announce the R1 license of The Melancholy of Haruhi Suzumiya. Here, she is credited as Patricia Lee, although she referred to herself as Patricia Ja Lee in the first videos. Before the animated series' English cast was announced, it was speculated that she might be the voice of Haruhi as well. In July 2007, Patricia appeared at Anime Expo during the SOS Brigade concert. She was replaced for the second series of promotional videos by Cristina Vee. Lee appeared in the Haruhi anime as the voice of Mizuki Okajima, the drummer of the all-girl student band ENOZ. Lee reprised this role in The Disappearance of Nagato Yuki-chan.

Lee appeared in a 2007 Oscar Mayer bologna advertisement as a spelling bee judge.

Lee's most notable role is Jill Valentine from the Resident Evil franchise. She provided the voice and motion capture work for the character in Resident Evil 5, released in 2009. Almost a year after the release of Resident Evil 5, Capcom produced a Gold edition, featuring two new scenarios, both of which starred the character, Jill Valentine. Lee reprised her role in both of these scenarios, titled Lost In Nightmares and Desperate Escape.

In 2009, she appeared at the Anime Expo alongside her former Power Rangers co-stars Selwyn Ward, Blake Foster, Roger Velasco, and Christopher Khayman Lee as a featured guest on the Power Rangers panel. Her last appearance as an actor was the 2019 game Teppen.

== Personal life ==
Since 2021, Lee has volunteered with the Pasadena Fire Department's EMS Reserve.

== Filmography ==
=== Anime roles ===
Year	Title	Role	Notes
1988	Akira	Additional voices	Film; Credited as Pee Jay Lee; 2001 Animaze version
1991	Mobile Suit Gundam 0083: Stardust Memory	Additional voices	Series
1998	Battle Athletes	Upperclassman A; Student; Commentator	OVA
1998	El Hazard: The Alternative World	Afura Mann	Series
1998	Serial Experiments Lain	Mika Iwakura	Series
1999	Battle Athletes Victory	Nurse, Additional Voices	Series
1999	Cowboy Bebop	Meifa Puzi	Series
2001	Gate Keepers	Megumi Kurogane	Series
2007	The Melancholy of Haruhi Suzumiya	Mizuki Okajima	Series
2008	Lucky☆Star	Patricia Martin	Series
2015	The Disappearance of Nagato Yuki-chan	Mizuki Okajima	Series

=== Other roles ===
Year	Title	Role	Notes
1997	Power Rangers Turbo	Cassie Chan / second Pink Turbo Ranger	Main role; 28 episodes
1998	Power Rangers in Space	Cassie Chan / Pink Space Ranger	Main role; 43 episodes
1999	Power Rangers Lost Galaxy	Cassie Chan / Pink Space Ranger	2 episodes
1999	Power Rangers: The Lost Episode	Cassie Chan	Special episode (archival footage)
2001	Extreme Challenge	Tang Ning	Film
2001	Phase Paradox	Uma Remick	Game; voice; credited as PJ Lee
2006	ASOS Brigade	Haruhi Suzumiya	Main role
2006	Hollywood Kills	Barback	Film
2007	Resident Evil: The Umbrella Chronicles	Jill Valentine	Game; voice, uncredited
2009	Resident Evil 5	Jill Valentine	Game; voice and motion capture
2010	Resident Evil 5: Gold Edition	Jill Valentine	Game; voice and motion capture for new DLC
2011	Resident Evil: The Mercenaries 3D	Jill Valentine	Game; voice
2014	Power Rangers Super Megaforce	Cassie Chan / Pink Space Ranger	Episode: “Legendary Battle”
2019	Teppen	Jill Valentine	Game; voice
