= Mark Wright (actor) =

New Zealand actor

Mark Wright is a New Zealand actor, comedic entertainer, writer, and raconteur. He is a Toi Whakaari NZ Drama School graduate. He is an international Theatresports champion, has appeared for every professional theatre company in New Zealand, and toured extensively throughout Australasia. Notably: The Rocky Horror Show, Bouncers, A Way Of Life, and A Midsummer Night’s Dream. He has featured in some 40 different television series/programmes/specials and has won two New Zealand Film & Television awards – both for best performance. Recent theatrical appearances include

- The Curious Incident of the Dog in the Night-time - Court Theatre
- 8 Gigabytes of Hardcore Pornography - Silo Theatre
- The Audience & 6 Degrees of Separation -Auckland Theatre Co.
- Ladies Night - Centrepoint Theatre

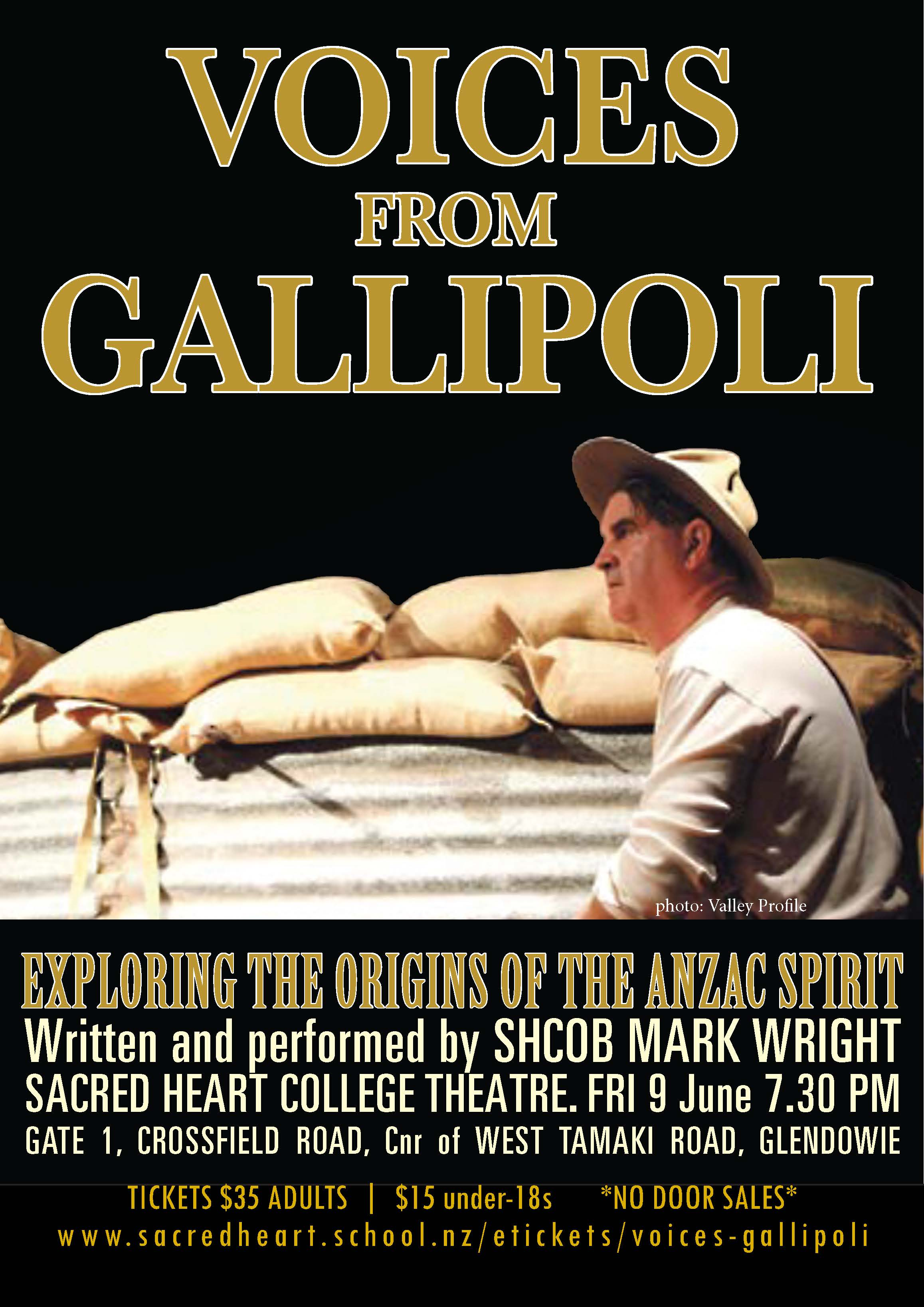
Poster from June 23 performance of Voices From Gallipoli

In June 2022, Wright premiered a new work 'The Gallipoli Monologues' (now titled 'Voices From Gallipoli') to great audience and critical acclaim.

His films include Murder in Greenwich, Her Majesty, Dirty Dave, I'm So Lonesome I Could Cry, and Alex.

His television credits including Peppermint Twist, The Billy T James Show, Issues with McPhail and Gadsby, That Comedy Show, Comedy Central, and Newsflash.

He has played three different characters on the iconic New Zealand series Shortland Street and also appeared on What Now, Amazing Extraordinary Friends, Power Rangers, Nothing Trivial, Terry Teo, Go Girls, and as the voices of Moa, Ichtheo and Niblicks on the animated series Kiri & Lou

== Biography ==
He was raised in St Heliers and educated at Sacred Heart College, Auckland, Selwyn College, Auckland, and Toi Whakaari. He graduated from Toi Whakaari with a Diploma in Acting in 1985. He was a stage actor in Wellington, and his first television appearance was as Mick Ryan in Peppermint Twist.

He was the 1994 TV Guide Television Award for Best Performer in an Entertainment Programme and the 1996 TV Guide Best Actor Award.

Wright is also a professional speaker.

His wife is Natalie Wright (nee Dennis) who played Shelley Crombie on Shortland Street from 1998-2001.

== Filmography ==
=== Television roles ===
1987
Peppermint Twist, Mick Ryan.
1994
- That Comedy Show

1995

- Sportsnight
- Comedy Central

1998

- Newsflash - Leonard Foxx

2003

- Power Rangers Ninja Storm - Businessman

2019

- Power Rangers Beast Morphers - General Burke

Undated

- Shark in the Park
- Shortland Street - Nurse Gary Fraser
- The Billy T James Show - Nigel Fitchurch
- 1990: The Issues - Various Characters
- Issues - Various Characters
- More Issues - Various Characters
- City Life - Derek Gillespie
- The Amazing Extraordinary Friends - Ben's Father

=== Voice-over roles ===
- Meet the Feebles - Sid the Elephant, The Masked Masochist, Louie the Dog, The Fish, Poodle, Bartender, Crab, Chorus-girls (voices)
- The Great Kiwi Video Show - Voices
- Power Rangers Ninja Storm - Amphibidor, Bopp-A-Roo, Mr. Ratwell (voices)
- Power Rangers Dino Thunder - Rojobot, White Terrorsaurus/White Terrorsaurus II (voices)
- Power Rangers S.P.D. - Rhinix, T-Top, Katana (voices)
- Power Rangers Mystic Force - Warmax (voice)
- Power Rangers Operation Overdrive - Magmador (voice)
- Power Rangers Jungle Fury - Scorch (voice)
- Power Rangers Samurai - Rofer, Epoxar (voices)
- Power Rangers Megaforce - Argus, Rotox, Rotox DX (voices)
- Power Rangers Dino Super Charge - Hookbeard, Doomwing (voices)
- Power Rangers Super Ninja Steel - Deceptron (voice)
- Power Rangers Beast Morphers - Clawtron (voice)
- Power Rangers Dino Fury - Trawler (voice)
- Power Rangers Cosmic Fury - Doodrip (voice)

=== Movie roles ===
- Alex - Male Commentator
- Kevin Rampenbacker and the Electric Kettle - Kevin
- I'm So Lonesome I Could Cry - Bill
- Her Majesty - Freezing Works Foreman
- Murder in Greenwich
- A Minecraft Movie - HR Person

=== Theatre ===
- The Rocky Horror Show
- A Way of Life
