= List of Power Rangers Dino Fury characters =

Power Rangers Dino Fury, and its third season Power Rangers Cosmic Fury, is an American children's television series that originally aired on Nickelodeon before being transferred to Netflix and serve as the 28th, 29th, 30th entries in the Power Rangers franchise. Dino Fury follows the Power Rangers Zayto (Russell Curry), Amelia Jones (Hunter Deno), Ollie Akana (Kai Moya), Izzy Garcia (Tessa Rao), Javi Garcia (Chance Perez), and Aiyon (Jordon Fite) as they protect the Earth from the armored alien warrior, Void Knight (Jared Turner), who seeks the Sporix to revive his lover Santaura (Siobhan Marshall) by any means necessary while Cosmic Fury sees the Rangers acquiring new powers to combat intergalactic warlord Lord Zedd and the intergalactic corporation Squid Ink Inc.

== Main characters ==
=== Dino/Cosmic Fury Power Rangers ===
Based in Dinohenge, located in a forest near the city of Pine Ridge, the Dino Fury Rangers wield Chromafury Sabers and a series of Dino Fury Keys, with a set of six for transformation and several Boost Keys that grant additional abilities. During Cosmic Fury, the Rangers use Cosmic Orbs.

==== Zayto ====
Zayto is an alien knight from the planet Rafkon with tactile telepathy. After pursuing the Sporix Beasts to Earth with a small team of his fellow knights, they joined forces with a group of dinosaurs and became the original Dino Fury Rangers, with Zayto becoming the Red Ranger. However, most of his original team fell in battle and he became separated from his fellow surviving knight, Aiyon. Zayto went into stasis for 65 million years to protect the Sporix they captured before he is revived and accidentally unleashes the Sporix in the present day. In response, Zayto leads a new group of Dino Fury Rangers in the hopes of stopping the evil forces that ravaged his planet from doing the same to Earth while trying to acclimate himself to Earth's culture. After sacrificing himself to destroy the Nemesis Beast, Zayto was revived by the Morphin Masters and temporarily granted the power to become the Dino Fury Zenith Ranger before turning him into the Cosmic Fury Zenith Ranger.

Throughout Cosmic Fury, Zayto assists his team in their fight against Lord Zedd and Squid Ink Inc. despite his waning lifespan before sacrificing his Ranger powers to restore Ollie's and returning to the Morphin Grid' to become a Morphin' Master.

Zayto is portrayed by Russell Curry.

==== Amelia Jones ====
Amelia Jones is a paranormal-obsessed journalist who works for the internet media agency, BuzzBlast. After pleading with her editor to report on Dinohenge and eventually gaining permission to run the story, she becomes the new Pink Ranger while preventing Void Knight from obtaining the Sporix. In season two, she enters a relationship with Ollie and discovers she is a Rafkonian and the daughter of Tarrick and Santaura. Using this knowledge, she frees Tarrick of his brainwashing and convinces Santaura to forgo her revenge plot. Six months later, they have reunited as a family, with Amelia expecting a baby sister named Poppy.

During the events of Cosmic Fury, Amelia becomes the Cosmic Fury Red Ranger and takes Zayto's place as the Rangers' leader.

Amelia Jones is portrayed by Hunter Deno.

==== Ollie Akana ====
Ollie Akana is a confident, logical skeptic who is never afraid to share his opinion, always needs to prove he is right, and believes everything can be explained by science. Growing up, he traveled the globe with his archaeologist mother, Dr. Lani Akana, before coming to Pine Ridge to study the mysterious Dinohenge. After he befriends Amelia, they follow Void Knight into the caverns beneath Dinohenge and Ollie becomes the new Blue Ranger while preventing Void Knight from obtaining the Sporix. While he initially clashes with Amelia over their beliefs, he eventually enters a relationship with her in season two.

During the events of Cosmic Fury, Ollie is brainwashed by Lord Zedd and forced to serve him as the Dino Fury Evil Blue Ranger until his allies free him from Zedd's control and grant him the power to become the Cosmic Fury Blue Ranger.

Ollie Akana is portrayed by Kai Moya.

==== Izzy Garcia ====
Isabella "Izzy" Garcia is a highly competitive and virtuous athlete and Javi's step-sister. Izzy becomes the new Green Ranger after helping the first three Rangers protect the Nephrite Orb. She later enters into a relationship with her former sports rival Fern.

Izzy Garcia is portrayed by Tessa Rao.

==== Javi Garcia ====
Javier "Javi" Garcia is a free-spirited musician and Izzy's step-brother who can be quiet at times, focusing his energy on his creative process and artistic endeavors. Though he loves music, he cannot settle on any one style or instrument. His step-sister Izzy is his biggest supporter and the most important person in his life while his father Carlos disapproves of his interests. Javi becomes the new Black Ranger after helping the first three Rangers defend the Nephrite Orb.

During the events of Cosmic Fury, Javi loses an arm while helping his allies gain new Zords and receives a prosthetic arm from Billy Cranston.

Javi Garcia is portrayed by Chance Perez.

==== Aiyon ====
Aiyon is a fun-loving Rafkonian knight and a surviving member of the original Dino Fury Ranger team like Zayto who was presumed dead. While Aiyon does not always follow the rules, he willingly fights for the righteous. When the Sporix were first created, Aiyon realized something was wrong with the machine that created them and tried to stop it from endangering Rafkon and the galaxy. While Zayto prevented him, he would eventually realize Aiyon was right. They traveled to Earth to stop the Sporix and became Dino Fury Rangers together, with Aiyon becoming the Gold Ranger, but were separated after Aiyon was stranded in the sea in a stasis pod while the rest of their original teammates died in battle. After the Ninja Nexus Prism locates his stasis pod in the present, Aiyon rejoins Zayto to combat Void Knight and his forces.

Aiyon is portrayed by Jordon Fite.

==== Fern ====
Fern (guest: Dino Fury; main: Cosmic Fury) is Izzy Garcia's sports rival, later girlfriend. During the events of Cosmic Fury, Fern inadvertently becomes involved with Izzy's work as a Power Ranger before receiving her own Ranger powers from Solon, becoming the Orange Cosmic Fury Ranger.

Fern is portrayed by Jacqueline Joe.

== Recurring characters ==
=== Morphin' Masters ===
The Morphin' Masters are six ageless beings with untold powers who monitor and empower various groups of Power Rangers, such as the original Dino Fury Rangers, the Dino Thunder Rangers, the Dino Charge Rangers, and the Ninja Steel Rangers. After the present day Dino Fury Rangers lose their powers while defeating Void Knight, the Green Morphin' Master restores them so they can face Lord Zedd despite her fellow Morphin' Masters' policy against intervening too many times. After the Green Morphin' Master sacrifices herself to capture Zedd, the Red and Blue Morphin' Masters free her and take Zedd away. However, Zedd escapes off-screen.

The Red, Blue and Green Morphin' Masters are voiced by Daryl Habraken, Kevin Keys and Beth Allen respectively.

=== Lani Akana ===
Dr. Lani Akana is a globetrotting archaeologist from the Global Association of Archaeology who recently moved to Pine Ridge to study Dinohenge with her son Ollie. Throughout season one, she remains unaware of Ollie being a Power Ranger until she is kidnapped by Void Knight's forces during the season one finale and Ollie inadvertently reveals his and his friends' secret identities while foiling Void Knight's plans.

Dr. Lani Akana is portrayed by Shavaughn Ruakere.

=== Carlos Garcia ===
Carlos Garcia is the short-tempered, stern park warden of Pine Ridge Park, father of Javi and Izzy, and husband of Rina.

Warden Carlos Garcia is portrayed by Blair Strang.

=== Tarrick ===
Tarrick, also known as Void Knight and Void King, is a mysterious Rafkonian warrior and Amelia Jones' father who came to Earth with his wife, Santaura, for a scavenging mission meant to restore Rafkon 20 years prior to the series, only to be captured and experimented on by scientists from Area 62. After asking Ed Jones to take care of Amelia for them and following an accident that left Santaura comatose, Tarrick believed Amelia was lost in an explosion. While searching for Sporix to revive Santaura, he found the Dino Knight Morpher and used it become Void Knight. Furthermore, he established the abandoned Area 62 as a base, built a machine capable of harnessing the Sporix to revive Santaura there, and comes into conflict with the Rangers until he discovers he can use the Morphin' Grid to power his machine instead and steals Dr. Akana's equipment to facilitate this goal. While the Rangers destroy his machine and seemingly destroy him, Tarrick survives and resurfaces sometime later to resume his plans.

He eventually collects enough Sporix to successfully revive Santaura, only to learn her plans run counter to his own. After failing to convince her to leave Earth with him, he is forced to seek out the Rangers for help in stopping her. To prove himself to them, he joins forces with and gives his powers to the Rangers to defeat Snageye, but Santaura kidnaps Tarrick and transforms him into the monstrous knight/heart-themed Void King, brainwashing him into serving her in the process. While aiding in Santaura's plot to destroy Pine Ridge via the Nemesis Beast, he is eventually freed by Amelia, who had discovered her heritage, and uses his Void Knight powers to teleport the Nemesis Beast's cocoon to a desert. After Amelia brings Santaura back to her senses, the three reunite as a family. Six months later, Tarrick and Santaura prepare for the arrival of their new daughter and Amelia's sister.

During the events of Cosmic Fury, Tarrick lends his assistance to the Cosmic Fury Rangers in their fight against Lord Zedd by forming a resistance movement with his fellow Earthbound Rafkonians and recruiting Heckyl to serve as a spy within Zedd's ranks.

As Void Knight, Tarrick wields the Void Saber. As Void King, he can fire lasers from his hands and eyes, produce shockwaves with his blows, possesses enhanced strength and durability, and wields a double-bladed naginata.

Tarrick is portrayed by Jared Turner.

==== Mucus ====
Mucus is a mushroom-themed Sporix Beast with the ability to reform her body after being destroyed and turn into slime who becomes Tarrick's minion. Unlike the other Sporix Beasts, she lacks the ability to grow. Amidst Santaura's efforts to create the Nemesis Beast to destroy Pine Ridge, Mucus is temporarily turned back into her Sporix form, but is freed after the Rangers defeat Santaura. Six months later, having gone into hiding with Slyther and taken on human forms, Mucus goes on to run a circus with him. The pair would later help the Cosmic Fury Rangers in their fight against Lord Zedd.

Mucus is voiced by Torum Heng, who also portrays her human form.

==== Boomtower ====
Boomtower is a robotic rook/tank-themed warrior who was created by Tarrick to help him gather Sporix. After several failed attempts to destroy the Rangers, Boomtower empowers himself with one of Void Knight's Sporix. While attempting to steal the Ninja Nexus Prism for Tarrick, Boomtower enlarges himself, but is destroyed by the Dino Fury Megazord Warrior Formation while Izzy reclaims the Sporix he used. Void Knight later orders the necromancer Reaghoul to resurrect Boomtower twice to stop the Rangers while he attempts to take control of the Morphin' Grid. Following both resurrections, Boomtower fights the Rangers, only to be destroyed twice more.

Months later, Void King tasks Scrozzle with using Boomtower's data to construct an upgraded knight/Gatling gun-themed model named Boomblaster to bolster Lord Zedd's forces. Boomblaster assists Zedd in his plot to steal the Sporix generator until the former is eventually destroyed by Aiyon.

Boomtower and Boomblaster are both voiced by Mark Mitchinson.

==== Santaura ====
Santaura is a Rafkonian, Tarrick's wife, and Amelia Jones' mother who came to Earth with him for a scavenging mission 20 years prior to the series, only to be captured and experimented on by scientists from Area 62 and end up comatose following an unspecified accident. By the present, Tarrick eventually succeeds in reviving Santaura, only to find that she has plans of her own. Upon discovering how he revived her, she takes a Sporix from his machine and uses it to transform into the monstrous Void Queen to seek revenge on humanity for harming her and seemingly taking her daughter from her. She would soon go on to usurp command of his forces and brainwash him into Void King so that he can serve her. After collecting the remaining Sporix and obtaining those of the Rangers', she uses them to create a Sporix cocoon, from which she intends to hatch the Nemesis Beast. However, a freed Tarrick teleports the cocoon to a desert, where Zayto sacrifices all of the Rangers' Zords to weaken the Nemesis Beast. Santaura tries to destroy the remaining Rangers and Tarrick, but Amelia convinces her to stand down, destroy the Nemesis Beast, and revert to her original form. Six months later, Santaura, Tarrick, and Amelia live peacefully as a family, with another daughter on the way.

Santaura is portrayed by Siobhan Marshall.

==== Slyther ====
Slyther is a robotic bishop/ringmaster-themed illusionist who was created by Mucus and empowered with a Sporix by Tarrick to aid in their cause, though he later loses his Sporix to Boomtower. While aiding in Santaura's plot to destroy Pine Ridge via a Sporix cocoon, Slyther tries to attack Amelia for infiltrating Area 62, but is driven off by her and the other Rangers. Six months later, he and Mucus have taken on human forms and began running a circus together. The pair would later help the Cosmic Fury Rangers in their fight against Lord Zedd.

Slyther is voiced by Campbell Cooley, who also portrays his "Mr. Wiz" disguise, while Sara Wiseman portrays his "Arla" disguise.

==== Wreckmate ====
Wreckmate is a robotic rook/submarine/pirate-themed warrior who was created by Slyther from boat parts to destroy the Mosa Razor Zord. After receiving a Sporix from Tarrick to increase his power and enlarge himself, Wreckmate defeats the Rangers in combat until Aiyon, Zayto, and the Mosa Razor Zord seemingly destroy him. Months later however, it is revealed that Wreckmate reverted to his normal size and returned to Pine Ridge via its sewers to serve Tarrick once more until he is eventually destroyed by the Primal Ultrazord while aiding in Santaura's plot to destroy Pine Ridge via a Sporix cocoon.

Wreckmate is voiced by John Leigh.

==== Snageye ====
Snageye is a robotic bishop/cannon-themed general built to serve Santaura. He succeeds in trapping the Rangers in his personal pocket dimension, but Tarrick frees Zayto and gives the latter his Dino Knight Morpher and Key so Zayto can destroy Snageye and free his friends. Months later, Void King tasks Scrozzle with using Snageye's data to build an upgraded version called Nulleye to assist in Lord Zedd's plot to steal the Sporix generator. After the Rangers and Green Morphin' Master defeat Zedd, Nulleye escapes with Void King and is eventually destroyed by Zayto while assisting in Santaura's plot to destroy Pine Ridge.

Snageye and Nulleye are both voiced by Steve McCleary.

=== Solon ===
Solon is a Solonosaurus and a friend of Zayto who was given cybernetic implants after being seriously wounded in battle against the Sporix Beasts.

Solon is voiced by Josephine Davison.

=== Ed Jones ===
Edward "Ed" Jones is a handyman in Pine Ridge and Amelia Jones' legal guardian, whom she affectionately calls "Pop-Pop" and initially believes is her grandfather. In season two, it is revealed Ed encountered Tarrick and Santaura while working at Area 62 and was asked to take care of an infant Amelia for them.

Ed Jones is portrayed by Greg Johnson.

=== Lord Zedd ===
Lord Zedd is an alien conqueror, husband of Rita Repulsa, and father of Thrax who previously fought the original Power Rangers before he was purified by Zordon's energy wave. During the events of Dino Fury, the necromancer Reaghoul revives Zedd in his original form and places a compliance collar on the latter to make him his servant. Zedd infiltrates Area 62 to locate the Sporix and defeats Void Knight and his group, but Reaghoul stops Zedd from killing them so the necromancer can join forces with Void Knight. Zedd captures four of the Dino Fury Rangers, but Ollie destroys Zedd's collar. Enraged, Zedd attacks Reaghoul for enslaving him until the necromancer escapes. Zedd fights the Dino Fury Rangers, but is forced to retreat upon realizing he does not have his staff. Upon recruiting Scrozzle, Lothorn, and Sizzurai as well as reclaiming his staff, Zedd resurfaces and forms an alliance with Void Queen and King to reach Rafkon, obtain the Sporix generator, and conquer Earth with a Sporix Beast army of his own. However, he is defeated by Aiyon and the Green Morphin' Master, with the latter sacrificing herself to destroy the Sporix generator and imprison Zedd in a crystalline prison so her fellow Morphin' Masters can take him away. Sometime later however, Zedd escapes off-screen.

During the events of Cosmic Fury, Zedd aligns himself with his liberators, Squid Ink Inc., to conquer the universe and steal the Morphin' Masters powers to evolve into Master Zedd. After being betrayed by the corporation and convinced by Zayto to relinquish his additional power, Zedd is trapped on the planet Nibyro with a hallucination of Rita.

Lord Zedd is voiced by Andrew Laing in Dino Fury and Fred Tatasciore in Cosmic Fury.

=== Bajilla Naire ===
Bajilla Naire is a callous, greedy, selfish, and insane opportunistic cephalopod-themed alien warmonger and CEO of Squid Ink Inc., an intergalactic mega-corporation that scours the universe with space-faring drones for raw materials to make weapons of war and capitalize on the resulting conflict. After freeing and joining forces with Lord Zedd, she sets her sights on Earth, intending to mine it for its resources and use its inhabitants as slave labor. She later betrays Zedd in an attempt to use him and the Morphin' Masters' energy to destroy all heroic individuals in the universe. However, she is killed by the Cosmic Fury Rangers.

In combat, Bajilla possesses the ability to modify her body, self-regeneration so long as a piece of her remains, and general superhuman capabilities.

Bajilla Naire is voiced by Amanda Billing.

== Guest characters ==
- Sporix Beasts: Mythical creature-themed alien monsters that were created by the Rafkonians to protect them, but terrorized Rafkon instead before coming to Earth. They were originally contained by the original Dino Fury Rangers 65 million years ago until Zayto accidentally releases them in the present day. Once a Sporix Beast hatches from their egg-like Sporix, they can gather energy and enlarge on their own if not defeated immediately. Upon being defeated, they revert to their Sporix form with more power than they originally possessed, leading to Tarrick and the Rangers competing to claim them.
  - Shockhorn – A unicorn-themed Sporix Beast with super-speed and a rapier who is recruited by Tarrick to obtain the Sporix. Shockhorn accompanies him to break into Dinohenge and retrieve the latter’s tracking device from Dr. Akana, but fails to complete either task due to Dinohenge's defenses and Dr. Akana's drone respectively. Shockhorn enlarges, but is defeated by the T-Rex Champion Zord before Tarrick takes his Sporix to power Santaura's stasis pod. Shockhorn is voiced by Jamie Linehan.
  - Vypeera – A Gorgon-themed Sporix Beast who can paralyze anyone who looks into her chest eyes. After hatching and teaming up with Mucus, she uses her ability on Pine Ridge's citizens until a blindfolded Zayto, with the help of the Sonic Dino Key, destroys the machine broadcasting her power. She enlarges, but is defeated by the Dino Fury Megazord before the Rangers reclaim her Sporix and place it back in containment. Vypeera is voiced by Rachelle Duncan.
  - Draknarok – A dragon-themed Sporix Beast with fire breath. After hatching and being recruited by Mucus off-screen, Tarrick tasks him with assisting Boomtower in obtaining the Nephrite Orb at the Pine Ridge Museum, only to be foiled by the Rangers. Draknarok enlarges, but is defeated by the Dino Fury Megazord before the Rangers reclaim his Sporix. Draknarok is voiced by Richard Simpson.
  - Brineblast – A kraken-themed Sporix Beast with water gun-like arms. After hatching, Mucus and Boomtower recruit him to help them find and destroy the Tiger Claw Zord. Brineblast enlarges, but is defeated by the Dino Fury Megazord Claw Formation before Boomtower retrieves his Sporix. He was later revived by Reaghoul to fight for him alongside Wolfgang only to be defeated again by the Dino Fury Megazord Blade Formation. Brineblast is voiced by Jason Smith.
  - Smashstone – A rock troll-themed Sporix Beast with arm-mounted volcanic blasters that allow him to absorb and redirect attacks. After hatching, he overpowers Amelia until Mucus and Tarrick recruit him to distract the Rangers from Boomtower's raid on their headquarters. Smashstone enlarges, but is defeated by the Dino Fury Megazord Hammer Formation before the Rangers reclaim his Sporix. Smashstone is voiced by Barry Duffield.
  - Doomsnake – A basilisk-themed Sporix Beast. After hatching and enlarging off-screen, he is defeated by the Dino Fury Megazord Blade Formation before Mucus retrieves his Sporix. Months later, Santaura takes Doomsnake's Sporix out of Tarrick's machine, which causes the beast to hatch once more. Tarrick recruits Doomsnake to distract the Rangers so Slyther can activate his Zord Jammer. Upon learning of the Ptera Freeze Zord, Tarrick sends Doomsnake to destroy it, but the latter is defeated by the Rangers, who reclaim his Sporix. Doomsnake is voiced by Steven Lyons.
  - Wolfgang – A Cerberus-themed Sporix Beast who can use his howl to disassemble anything. After hatching and being recruited by Tarrick off-screen, he is tasked with disabling the Rangers' Megazord and stealing the Ninja Nexus Prism until Mick Kanic creates a special lozenge to negate the beast's powers. Wolfgang enlarges, but is defeated by the Dino Fury Megazord Warrior Formation before Mucus retrieves his Sporix. He was later revived by Reaghoul to fight for him alongside Brineblast only to be defeated again by the Dino Fury Megazord Blade Formation. Wolfgang is voiced by Guy Langford.
  - Roostafa – A cockatrice-themed Sporix Beast who can fly and fire laser blasts from his mouth. After hatching and being recruited by Tarrick off-screen, he assists in his plot to block the Rangers' communication and teleportation capabilities. Roostafa enlarges, but is defeated by the Dino Fury Megazord Warrior Formation before the Rangers reclaim his Sporix. Roostafa is voiced by Tom Kane.
  - Tombtress – A mummy-themed Sporix Beast clad in pyramid-like armor who can generate bandages, locate valuable objects, and fire a beam from her chest that heightens targets' emotions. After hatching and being recruited by Tarrick off-screen, Tombtress is tasked with finding the Dimetro Blazing Key. She enlarges, but is defeated by the T-Rex Blazing Megazord before the Rangers claim her Sporix off-screen. Tombtress is voiced by Kira Josephson.
  - Fogshell – A shen-themed Sporix Beast who can generate fog. After hatching and being recruited by Slyther and Mucus off-screen, he helps them in their scheme to intercept calls made to the Ranger hotline and retrieve unhatched Sporix first. When the Rangers foil the scheme however, Fogshell escapes with the duo. Sometime later, Slyther recruits Fogshell to help him distract the Rangers while he kidnaps their friend Adrian and ransom him for their Sporix. Fogshell enlarges, but is defeated by the T-Rex Blazing Megazord before the Rangers reclaim his Sporix. Fogshell is voiced by Steven Lyons.
  - Tidemare – A kelpie-themed Sporix Beast with hydrokinetic abilities. After hatching and overpowering the Rangers, he is recruited by Slyther off-screen to distract them while he locates the source of a strange storm. Tidemare defeats the Rangers once more, but is defeated by Aiyon in turn before the Rangers reclaim his Sporix. Tidemare is voiced by Richard Simpson.
  - Trawler – A ghost ship-themed Sporix Beast who can generate nets, burrow underground, possesses a rake for a right arm, and wields several cannons capable of firing energy shots. After hatching, Trawler fights the Rangers before being recruited by Mucus for Tarrick, who tasks him with helping Slyther lure the Rangers into a trap and capture the Mosa Razor Zord. Trawler enlarges, but is defeated by the Dino Fury Megazord Claw Formation and the Electro Zord before the Rangers reclaim his Sporix. Trawler is voiced by Mark Wright.
  - Stone Triplets – A trio of identical golem-themed Sporix Beast brothers consisting of Stone-Rad, Stone-Sad, and Stone-Mad who all have invulnerability and the ability to combine together to increase their power. After hatching and being recruited by Tarrick off-screen, they assist him in fighting the Rangers. When the Rangers defeat Stone-Rad and claim his Sporix, the remaining brothers retaliate by using a mega sleep bomb, enlarging, and merging together into a single larger version of their original forms. Nonetheless, they are defeated by the Fusion Ultrazord while Izzy defuses the bomb and Mucus claims their Sporix. The Stone Triplets are all voiced by Steve McCleary.
  - Boneswitch – A faun/satyr-themed Sporix Beast capable of swapping targets' minds, generating energy slashes, and leaping great distances. After hatching and being recruited by Slyther and Mucus off-screen, Tarrick tasks him with stealing pirate talismans from the Pine Ridge Museum. However, Boneswitch fails to find the artifacts and uses his powers on the Rangers before escaping. Following a rematch with the Rangers and Boneswitch enlarging, he is defeated by the Mosa Razor Zord before Tarrick claims his Sporix. Boneswitch is voiced by Julian Wilson.
  - Bitscreem – A grim reaper/computer virus-themed Sporix Beast with scythe-like arms, the ability to travel through the internet, "rebooting" himself to undo damage, and separate himself into several clones capable of exploding on contact. After hatching and being recruited by Tarrick off-screen, Bitscreem is tasked with spying on the Rangers, reorganizing Tarrick's forces, stealing the Rangers' Fix-It Dino Key, and retrieving Tarrick's Void Saber. Bitscreem enlarges, but is defeated by the T-Rex Cosmic Megazord while Tarrick retrieves his Sporix. Bitscreem is voiced by Estevez Gillespie.
  - Occulo – A dodomeki-themed Sporix Beast with enhanced strength and durability as well as multiple eyes that grant omnidirectional, laser, and x-ray vision. After hatching off-screen, he is recruited by Tarrick to retrieve enough Sporix to fully revive Santaura. Occulo enlarges, but is defeated by the Dino Fury Megazord Smash Formation while Tarrick retrieves his Sporix. Occulo is voiced by David Mackie.
  - Junkalo – A poltergeist-themed Sporix Beast capable of absorbing and regurgitating objects and emitting poisonous gas. After escaping from Tarrick's machine and hatching, he is recruited by Tarrick to help him construct a Zord Jammer. Junkalo enlarges, but is defeated by the Dino Fury Megazord Smash Formation before the Rangers reclaim his Sporix. Junkalo is voiced by Michael Saccente.
  - Squashblight – A jack-o'-lantern-themed Sporix Beast capable of producing venom that can turn people into trees, walking on clouds, and wields an umbrella that grants limited flight and a myriad of candies capable of producing storm clouds from his venom. Santaura summons him from Tarrick's machine and tasks him with poisoning Pine Ridge's water supply with his venom. Squashblight enlarges, but is defeated by the Ptera Smash Ultrazord before the Rangers reclaim his Sporix. Squashblight is voiced by John Leigh.
  - Trackenslash – A Dullahan-themed Sporix Beast that possesses arm blades, a heightened sense of smell, super-speed, light breath, and dermal armor. Santaura summons him from Tarrick's machine and tasks him with finding Tarrick. Trackenslash is defeated by Zayto and Tarrick and the Rangers reclaim his Sporix. Trackenslash is voiced by Stephen Butterworth.
  - Flapnarok – A dragon-themed Sporix Beast and the sister of Draknarok with similar capabilities as him, as well as flight, the ability to breathe underwater and shoot lightning bolts from her horn, and a collar that allows her to automatically enlarge herself. She serves Santaura until she is defeated by the Primal Ultrazord. Flapnarok is voiced by Penny Ashton.
  - Hexcurio – A phantom/genie-themed Sporix Beast who wields "Wish Charms", a pen-like staff, and a horn blade. After hatching off-screen, he joins Mucus in causing chaos with his Wish Charms until the Rangers eventually defeat him. He enlarges, but is defeated by the Primal Ultrazord before Mucus claims his Sporix. Hexcurio is voiced by Paul Barrett.
  - Quickspine – A sylph-themed Sporix Beast who possesses super-speed. After hatching off-screen, he was sent to find and steal Warden Garcia’s drill key. After enlarging, he is defeated by the Primal Ultrazord before Santaura claims his Sporix. Quickspine is voiced by Paul Waggott.
  - Sugarhit – A dwarf/confection-themed Sporix Beast with martial arts skills, the ability to shoot strawberries from his head and pies from his hands, and a spatula capable of creating a cake wall for defensive purposes. Serving under Mucus, he heads to Japan to distract the Rangers from Void King and Queen's failed attempt to burrow into Dinohenge. After enlarging, Sugarhit is defeated by the Mosa Cosmic Megazord before the Rangers reclaim his Sporix. Sugarhit is voiced by Richard Simpson.
  - Clawfare – A gnome-themed Sporix Beast with a missile launcher on his head. Serving under Nulleye, he distracts the Rangers from Void King and Queen's renewed attempt to burrow into Dinohenge and steal the Rangers' Sporix chest. After enlarging, Clawfare is defeated by the Primal Ultrazord before Void Queen claims his Sporix. Clawfare is voiced by Andy Faulkner.
  - Crashflood – A Charybdis-themed Sporix Beast who possesses hydrokinesis. He takes part in the Sporix Beasts' siege on Pine Ridge until he is defeated by Zayto and Aiyon, with Santaura subsequently using his Sporix to contribute to creating a Sporix cocoon. Crashflood is voiced by Dallas Barnett.
  - Nemesis Beast – A queen-themed Sporix Beast that Void Queen hatches from a cocoon created with all of the Sporix. She intends to use it to destroy Pine Ridge, but Tarrick teleports the cocoon containing it to a desert. The Nemesis Beast hatches, but Zayto sacrifices the Rangers' Zords to weaken it before a redeemed Void Queen destroys it.
- Jane Fairview: The editor-in-chief at the internet company BuzzBlast and Amelia and Javi's boss. Jane Fairview is portrayed by Kira Josephson.
- J-Borg: An android developed by Hartford Robotics who works as Jane's assistant at BuzzBlast. J-Borg is portrayed by Victoria Abbott.
- Mick Kanic: An alien from the Lion Galaxy and ally of the Ninja Steel Rangers with the ability to shapeshift into inanimate objects and animals. After the Ninja Nexus Prism travels to Pine Ridge, he pursues it and encounters the Dino Fury Rangers. He later assists the Cosmic Fury Rangers in their fight against Lord Zedd after regaining his Ranger power. Mick Kanic is portrayed by Kelson Henderson.
- Lily: A Special Olympics athlete, the cousin of Izzy and Javi Garcia, and niece of Carlos Garcia. Lily is portrayed by Sarah Dalton.
- Adrian: A young athlete and friend of Izzy and Fern's. Adrian is portrayed by Max Crean.
- Reaghoul: A monstrous necromancer who seeks the Sporix to enhance his powers. He revives and enslaves Lord Zedd to assist him and joins forces with Void Knight, but Ollie frees Zedd from Reaghoul's control. Void Knight has Reaghoul imprisoned for his failure, but later frees him to revive Boomtower and distract the Rangers while he steals Dr. Akana's equipment. Reaghoul enlarges himself to stop the Rangers, but is destroyed by Zayto in the T-Rex Cosmic Megazord. Reaghoul is voiced by Geoff Dolan.
- Beatrice Cotton: The curator of Pine Ridge Museum who dates Ed Jones and helps the Dino Fury Rangers find two missing Dino Keys. Beatrice Cotton is portrayed by Margaret–Mary Hollins.
- Nibyro Guardian: The orb-like guardian of the planet Nibyro and the Light and Shadow Raptor Zords who possesses illusionary powers. The Nibyro Guardian is voiced by Michael Hurst.
- Rina Garcia: The mother of Izzy, step-mother of Javi, and wife of Carlos. Rina Garcia is portrayed by Saraid de Silva.
- Blair Bartlett: The former lead singer of a band called the Screaming Zombies. The Dino Fury Rangers first encounter him upon learning he has the Freeze Dino Key, which Bartlett gives to Javi in exchange for the latter filling in for his guitarist. Bartlett later steals one of Javi's songs for a song competition, but loses to him. Blair Bartlett is portrayed by Robbie Evison.
- Annie: An employee at BuzzBlast who directs videos for Jane and films her own videos. Annie is portrayed by Benny Joy Smith.
- Stan: A reporter at BuzzBlast. Stan is portrayed by Noah Paul.
- General Shaw: A member of Grid Battleforce and former commanding officer of the Beast Morpher Rangers. General Shaw is portrayed by Teuila Blakely.
- Lothorn – Lokar's Satan-themed nephew who Lord Zedd recruits to distract the Dino Fury Rangers. After being defeated by them, Lothorn uses an enlargement device on himself, but is killed by the Primal Ultrazord. Lothorn is voiced by Julian Wilson.
- Scrozzle: An android who previously served Evox and fought the Beast Morpher Rangers before he was captured by Ben and Betty Burke and Colonel Mason Truman. During the events of Dino Fury, after being released from Grid Battleforce's custody by Lord Zeed, Scrozzle joins forces with him to assist in his plot to conquer Earth by bolstering his forces with robotic warriors. However, he abandons Zedd after Aiyon destroys one of his creations, Boomblaster. During the events of Cosmic Fury, Scrozzle returns to Zedd's side to aid him in his intergalactic conquest before betraying him to join Bajilla Naire and then fleeing. Scrozzle is voiced by Campbell Cooley.
- Sizzurai – A king/samurai-themed android from the planet Vonix who serves Lord Zedd. While assisting the latter in his plot to conquer Earth, Sizzurai is destroyed by Zayto while deflecting an attack from Zedd. Sizzurai is voiced by Adrian Smith.
- Orria: The leader of Rafkonian survivors following the planet's destruction. She initially comes to Earth with the intention of destroying it under the belief that all humans are evil until Pop Pop rescues her from Fogshell. Changing her mind, she and her fellow survivors make Area 62 their new home. Orria is portrayed by Brooke Petersen.
- Squilla Naire: Bajilla's spoiled, childish, and social media-obsessed daughter. After being captured by Heckyl and Tarrick, the Cosmic Fury Rangers attempt to interrogate Squilla for information on Bajilla and Zedd's plans before eventually killing her. Squilla Naire is voiced by Brooke Williams.
- Inkworth: Bajilla Naire's loyal and sycophantic squid-themed butler who is eventually killed by the Cosmic Fury Ultrazord. Inkworth is voiced by Chris Howden.
- Doodrip: A serpent-themed alien and servant of Lord Zedd. After turning Ollie Akana evil, Doodrip betrays Zedd when the latter fires him and attempts to kill the Dino Fury Rangers before him, only to be killed by them via the Cosmic Fury Zords. Doodrip is voiced by Mark Wright.
- Krymzo: A scorpion-themed alien and employee of Squid Ink Inc. who is killed by Javi. Kryzmo is voiced by Robert Mignault.
- Quaddo: A Nebra sky disc-themed alien and employee of Squid Ink Inc. who is killed by Izzy. Quaddo is voiced by Riley Druce.
- Jadana: A smithsonite-themed alien and employee of Squid Ink Inc. who is killed by Aiyon. Jadana is voiced by Cristina Ionda.
- Snoutia: A tapir-themed alien and employee of Squid Ink Inc. Snoutia is voiced by Lori Dungey.
- Jozotic: An alien hunter and employee of Squid Ink Inc. who prefers hunting scuttleworms over fighting the Cosmic Fury Rangers and possesses an anchor-like blade as his weapon and a large hook for a left hand. Jozotic is voiced by Ashton Brown.
- Omwhyzo: A cocky crow/Corvus-themed alien, servant of Lord Zedd, Squilla Naire's bodyguard, and commander of the former's invasion of Earth who harbors feelings for his charge and jealousy towards anyone makes advances towards her. He is later killed by Tarrick. Omwhyzo is voiced by Joseph Witkowski.
- Heckyl: A humanoid alien from the planet Sentai 6, guardian of the Dark Energem, and enemy-turned-ally of the Dino Charge Power Rangers from another dimension who can transform into the Dino Charge Dark Ranger. After meeting Tarrick sometime prior to Cosmic Fury, Heckyl travels to the former's dimension to join his resistance movement and serve as a spy within Lord Zedd's ranks until he is exposed and captured. Nonetheless, Tarrick frees Heckyl so he can help capture Squilla Naire. Heckyl is portrayed by Ryan Carter.
