= John Whitman =

John Whitman may refer to:

- John Whitman (businessman), American businessman and first gentleman of New Jersey
- John Whitman (author), American author and martial arts instructor
- John Whitman (Shortland Street), fictional character
