= Power Rangers Dino Fury =

28th season of the Power Rangers franchise

- Genre: Action; Adventure; Science fiction; Superhero
- Created by: Haim Saban; Toei Company
- Based on: Kishiryu Sentai Ryusoulger by Toei Company
- Developed by: Hasbro/Entertainment One; Toei Company
- Showrunner: Simon Bennett
- Creative directors: Becca Barnes; Alwyn Dale
- Starring: Russell Curry; Hunter Deno; Kai Moya; Tessa Rao; Chance Perez; Jordon Fite
- Theme music composer: Bert Selen
- Opening theme: "Power Rangers Dino Fury" by Bert Selen
- Composer: Bert Selen
- Countries of origin: United States; Canada; Japan
- Original language: English
- No. of seasons: 2
- No. of episodes: 44

Production
- Executive producers: Simon Bennett; Brian Goldner; Olivier Dumont; Haim Saban
- Production locations: New Zealand (Auckland Region) (Auckland); Japan (Greater Tokyo Area) (Tokyo, Saitama, Yokohama, Gunma) and Kyoto)
- Cinematography: Ollie Jones (DOP); Drew Sturge (Camera Operator/DOP); Ayrton Winitana (Camera Operator/DOP)
- Camera setup: Single-camera
- Running time: 22 minutes
- Production companies: Entertainment One; Power Rangers Productions; Toei Company

Original release
- Network: Nickelodeon (season 1) Netflix
- Release: February 20, 2021 – September 29, 2022

Related
- Power Rangers television series

Power Rangers Dino Fury is a television series and the twenty-second entry of the Power Rangers franchise. The first season premiered on Nickelodeon in the United States on February 20, 2021, and concluded on December 18, 2021. The second season premiered on Netflix on March 3, 2022, and concluded on September 29, 2022; making it the first season to air exclusively on an online streaming service.

Dino Fury is the first television series produced by Entertainment One following its acquisition by Hasbro in 2019. The season is produced using footage, costumes, and props from Kishiryu Sentai Ryusoulger, the forty-third entry in the Japanese tokusatsu drama Super Sentai metaseries, with minimal costume and prop elements being recycled from Ressha Sentai ToQger.

Power Rangers Cosmic Fury released on Netflix on September 29, 2023, which served as a continuation of Dino Fury's storyline with the Dino Fury cast reprising their roles. As the 30th anniversary celebration of the franchise, Cosmic Fury featured new original suits, with Zord and villain footage adapted from Uchu Sentai Kyuranger. The season consisted of 10 episodes. Cosmic Fury was the first season of Power Rangers to feature a female Red Ranger for a full season. Cosmic Fury also featured the return of David Yost as Billy Cranston.

== Plot ==
Sixty-five million years ago, evil alien monsters known as Sporix Beasts ravaged the planet Rafkon before traveling to Earth. However, six Rafkonian knights pursued them and, along with six dinosaurs, were granted the power to become the Dino Fury Power Rangers by the Morphin' Masters. They captured the Sporix, though all were seemingly lost except for the Red Ranger, Zayto, who went into stasis to prevent the Sporix's escape. In the present, intergalactic warrior Void Knight accidentally unleashes the Sporix while trying to steal them, forcing Zayto and his friend, a cyborg dinosaur named Solon, to recruit a new team of Rangers consisting of teenagers Amelia Jones, Ollie Akana, stepsiblings Izzy and Javi Garcia, and fellow knight Aiyon to help in their fight.

== Cast and characters ==
Rangers

- Russell Curry as Zayto, the Red Dino Fury Ranger
- Hunter Deno as Amelia Jones, the Pink Dino Fury Ranger
- Kai Moya as Ollie Akana, the Blue Dino Fury Ranger
- Tessa Rao as Izzy Garcia, the Green Dino Fury Ranger
- Chance Perez as Javi Garcia, the Black Dino Fury Ranger
- Jordon Fite as Aiyon, the Gold Dino Fury Ranger

Supporting characters

- Shavaughn Ruakere as Dr. Lani Akana
- Blair Strang as Warden Carlos Garcia
- Saraid de Silva as Rina Garcia
- Josephine Davison as the voice of Solon
- Kira Josephson as Jane Fairview
- Victoria Abbott as J-Borg
- Benny Joy Smith as Annie
- Noah Paul as Stan
- Greg Johnson as Ed "Pop-Pop" Jones
- Jacqueline Joe as Fern
- Max Crean as Adrian

Villains

- Jared Turner as Tarrick / Void Knight / Void King
- Siobhan Marshall as Santaura / Void Queen
- Torum Heng as the voice and human form of Mucus
- Mark Mitchinson as the voice of Boomtower and Boomblaster
- Campbell Cooley as the voice of Slyther and Scrozzle
  - Sara Wiseman as Arla (Slyther's disguise)
  - Campbell Cooley as Mr. Wiz (Slyther's disguise)
  - Blair Strang as Warden Carlos Garcia (Slyther's disguise)
  - Max Crean as Adrian (Slyther's disguise)
- John Leigh as the voice of Wreckmate
- Andrew Laing as the voice of Lord Zedd
- Steve McCleary as the voice of Snageye and Nulleye
- Adrian Smith as the voice of Sizzurai

Guest stars

- Kelson Henderson as Mick Kanic
- Teuila Blakely as General Shaw
- Daryl Habraken as the voice of Red Morphin Master
- Kevin Keys as the voice of Blue Morphin Master
- Beth Allen as the voice of Green Morphin Master
- Michael Hurst as the voice of the Nibyro Guardian

== Episodes ==
=== Season 1 (2021) ===
No. overall	No. in season	Title	Directed by	Written by	Original release date	U.S. viewers (millions)
1	1	"Destination Dinohenge"	Charlie Haskell	Becca Barnes & Alwyn Dale	February 20, 2021 (NCK) (Note: This episode was later released on June 15, 2021 on Netflix.)	0.34
65 million years ago, the evil Sporix Beasts ravaged the planet Rafkon before traveling to Earth. Six Rafkonian knights followed them and, together with six dinosaurs, were granted the power to become Dino Fury Power Rangers by the Morphin' Masters. All but one seemingly fell in battle as the Sporix were captured while the survivor, the Red Ranger Zayto, went into stasis. In the present, reporter Amelia Jones tricks her boss Jane Fairview into letting her do a story on the mysterious Dinohenge statues while secretly hunting for ghosts. There, she encounters mother and son, Dr. Lani and Ollie Akana, who discover a hidden chamber underneath the statues and incur Park Warden Carlos Garcia's wrath for not having permits. While Lani accompanies Carlos, Amelia and Ollie witness a mysterious warrior named Void Knight enter the chamber searching for the Sporix before a cyborg dinosaur named Solon tries to stop him. Ollie and Amelia defend Solon, becoming the Blue and Pink Rangers in the process respectively before Solon reawakens Zayto. He intervenes, but accidentally unleashes the Sporix, forcing Void Knight to retreat. After recounting what happened to him to Ollie and Amelia, Zayto offers to train them in their newfound powers.
2	2	"Sporix Unleashed"	Charlie Haskell	Alwyn Dale & Becca Barnes	February 27, 2021 (NCK) (Note: This episode was later released on June 15, 2021 on Netflix.)	0.34
While restoring Dinohenge's defenses, Solon finds Void Knight's energy scanner. Ollie wants to combine it with Lani's drone to find the Sporix quickly, but Zayto prioritizes warning the city of Pine Ridge to minimize casualties. Ollie reluctantly agrees, but the Rangers fail to convince anyone, so Ollie breaks off to implement his idea. After the other Rangers learn that a Sporix Beast named Mucus has hatched, he leaves Lani to join them. The Rangers defeat Mucus, but another Sporix Beast, Shockhorn, attacks them before escaping with Mucus. Returning to Dinohenge, Zayto and Amelia learn what Ollie did and return to Lani, who Void Knight and the Sporix Beasts have forced to help them. As the Rangers fight Void Knight and Shockhorn, Lani overpowers Mucus and destroys her drone and the scanner, forcing the villains to retreat. When Shockhorn grows into a giant, Solon deploys the T-Rex Champion Zord so Zayto can turn the monster back into a Sporix. The Rangers attempt to reclaim it, but Void Knight steals it and takes it to the abandoned Area 62 to start powering a machine he is operating. Afterward, the Rangers address Zayto and Ollie's concerns by establishing a Ranger hotline.
3	3	"Lost Signal"	Chris Graham	Becca Barnes & Alwyn Dale	March 6, 2021 (NCK) (Note: This episode was later released on June 15, 2021 on Netflix.)	0.33
As Zayto reminisces about his life on Rafkon, Solon receives a message from the galaxy Rafkon is in, but her modulator is destroyed and she is unable to fix it. He starts to lose hope, but Amelia and Ollie suggest they see a psychic and the observatory, respectively, to find out if they can decipher the message. Zayto agrees, but the psychic proves to be a fraud. Suddenly, a Sporix Beast called Vypeera attacks. While the Rangers confront her, she overwhelms them before escaping with Mucus. Upon recovering, the Rangers try the observatory, but fail to learn anything. A crestfallen Zayto returns to Dinohenge while Ollie and Amelia investigate a disturbance at her workplace, BuzzBlast, where everyone present is paralyzed by a video Vypeera and Mucus created. Remembering a fond memory of his mother, Zayto confronts Vypeera with a blindfold and a Dino Boost Key that enhances his hearing so he can destroy Vypeera's video. When she enlarges, Solon deploys the T-Rex Champion, Tricera Blade, and Ankylo Hammer Zords, allowing the three Rangers to form the Dino Fury Megazord, defeat Vypeera, and reclaim her Sporix before Void Knight can.
4	4	"New Recruits"	Chris Graham	Story by : Alwyn Dale & Becca Barnes; Teleplay by : Alwyn Dale	March 20, 2021 (NCK) (Note: This episode was later released on June 15, 2021 on Netflix.)	0.23
Void Knight creates a robotic general named Boomtower and sends him, Mucus, and the Sporix Beast Draknarok to steal the Nephrite Orb from the city museum to make Boomtower invincible. Meanwhile, Zayto applies for a reporter job at BuzzBlast, but goes up against musician Javi Garcia. As such, Jane sets them both a reporting task for their application. Javi must study the Nephrite Orb while Zayto must interview Javi's athlete step-sister, Izzy. However, Javi's interview is cut short when the Orb is stolen and Zayto must end his to stop the monsters. During the battle, Boomtower drops the Orb, which Javi steals while Izzy helps the Rangers locate him. After the Rangers rescue the siblings from Boomtower, Javi smashes the Orb, which contained the lost Tiger and Stego Dino Keys. Izzy and Javi bond with them and turn into the Green and Black Rangers respectively. The five Rangers force Boomtower and Mucus to retreat while Draknarok enlarges, though the Rangers summon the Dino Fury Megazord to defeat him and reclaim his Sporix. After introducing the Garcias to Solon, the Rangers return to BuzzBlast, where they learn Javi got the job for his valor in protecting the Orb.
5	5	"Winning Attitude"	Chris Graham	Story by : Becca Barnes & Alwyn Dale; Teleplay by : Becca Barnes	March 27, 2021 (NCK) (Note: This episode was later released on June 15, 2021 on Netflix.)	0.28
While Solon works to find Izzy and Javi's missing Zords, the former trains for a cross-country race with her athlete cousin, Lily, but ends up becoming too determined to win and brushes her off. Meanwhile, Void Knight, his minions, and the Sporix Beast Brineblast intend to destroy two missing Zords. On the day of the race, the villains initiate their plan, forcing Izzy's allies to leave to confront them. During the race, Izzy helps an injured rival, Fern, but loses her lead. She later stumbles upon Boomtower and Mucus, who reveal their plan to destroy the missing Zords with a bomb to her before escaping. Joining the battle, Izzy helps her comrades against an enlarged Brineblast, during which they trick the beast into unearthing the Tiger Claw Zord before the bomb explodes. With the new Zord, the Rangers defeat Brineblast, but Boomtower claims his Sporix. The Rangers return to the race, where Izzy, despite finishing last, is praised for her good sportsmanship and reconciles with Lily.
6	6	"Superstition Strikes"	Michael Hurst	Story by : Alwyn Dale, Becca Barnes & Maiya Thompson; Teleplay by : Maiya Thompson	April 3, 2021 (NCK) (Note: This episode was later released on June 15, 2021 on Netflix.)	0.31
While the Rangers investigate BuzzBlast for Sporix activity, Amelia suffers an accident and believes she is jinxed. Following this, she ends up suffering more accidents when she attempts to engage the Sporix Beast Smashstone, during which she loses her morpher to Mucus. Using the morpher, Void Knight plans to access Dinohenge and steal the Rangers' Sporix while Smashstone distracts them. Meanwhile, still traumatized by her "bad luck", Amelia opts not to join her comrades in battling the monster. However, Solon helps her focus on life's positives before Amelia foils Boomtower's raid and forces him to retreat. Joining her comrades to fight an enlarged Smashstone, Amelia formulates a new Megazord formation to defeat the Beast, with Izzy claiming his Sporix before Boomtower can.
7	7	"Stego Search"	Michael Hurst	Story by : Becca Barnes & Alwyn Dale; Teleplay by : Guy Langford	April 10, 2021 (NCK) (Note: This episode was later released on June 15, 2021 on Netflix.)	0.27
Solon works to locate Javi's Zord while he gets his keytar confiscated by his father, which sours his attitude. Izzy tries to approach Javi when Boomtower, having used a Sporix to strengthen himself, attacks the city. The Rangers head out to engage him, but are overpowered, with Izzy being injured. The Rangers later discover why Javi was acting distant and that his Zord responds to his music. Ollie, Amelia, and Zayto are sent out to engage Boomtower, who enlarged himself using the Sporix he took, while Javi finds his Stego Spike Zord in the forest and sends it out to aid them. With their new Zord, the four Rangers defeat Boomtower, forcing the enemy to retreat. Afterwards, the Rangers give a new keytar to Javi, who apologizes to them for being reserved about his issues.
8	8	"Unexpected Guest"	Michael Hurst	Story by : Alwyn Dale & Becca Barnes; Teleplay by : Maiya Thompson	April 17, 2021 (NCK) (Note: This episode was later released on June 15, 2021 on Netflix.)	0.27
The Rangers defeat the Sporix Beast Doomsnake, only for another Sporix Beast, Wolfgang, to disable their Megazord. While the Rangers discuss their situation, Mick Kanic drops in to ask for help in his search for the Ninja Nexus Prism. When Zayto curtly declines, Kanic searches Pine Ridge for the prism, but ends up running into Wolfgang. Arriving at the scene, the Rangers engage the beast and rescue Kanic. After he explains his adventures and mission, Zayto agrees to help Kanic find the Prism. Locating it at the waterfront, Zayto discovers its origins before Boomtower and Wolfgang attack. The Rangers are nearly defeated until Kanic develops a special lozenge to negate Wolfgang's powers. Despite this, Wolfgang and Boomtower enlarge, forcing the Rangers to summon their Zords to defeat them, with Mucus claiming Wolfgang's Sporix and Izzy reclaiming Boomtower's. Afterwards, Zayto apologizes to Kanic while Void Knight struggles to revive his wife Santaura, who is in a stasis chamber connected to his machine.
9	9	"Cut Off"	Charlie Haskell	Story by : Becca Barnes, Alwyn Dale, Guy Langford & Maiya Thompson; Teleplay by : Guy Langford	June 15, 2021 (NF) (Note: This episode was later broadcast on September 18, 2021 on Nickelodeon.)	0.31
The Rangers go to the woods for a camping trip, but Ollie brings gadgets that serve no useful purpose. Discovering their campsite, Void Knight, Mucus, and the Sporix Beast Roostafa launch a disruptor into the sky to disable the Rangers' technology and cut them off from the city so the villains can search for unhatched Sporix in peace. While Ollie stays behind, believing he can use his gadgets to destroy the disruptor, the others attempt to hike back to the city, but end up traveling in circles and hiking back to their campsite. Working together, the Rangers destroy the disruptor and teleport to the city. They defeat Roostafa with the Dino Fury Megazord Warrior Formation and claim his Sporix, but Void Knight escapes with three unhatched Sporix he found.
10	10	"Phoning Home"	Charlie Haskell	Story by : Alwyn Dale, Becca Barnes, Maiya Thompson & Guy Langford; Teleplay by : Maiya Thompson	June 15, 2021 (NF) (Note: This episode was later broadcast on September 25, 2021 on Nickelodeon.)	0.27
Mucus creates a new robotic general named Slyther, a master illusionist who can disguise himself as anyone, before Void Knight orders him to infiltrate the Rangers' base and retrieve their Sporix. Meanwhile, Zayto sends another message to Rafkon hoping for a response. Witnessing the attempt from afar, Slyther disguises himself as a Rafkonian named Arla and appears before the Rangers, claiming she came to investigate Zayto's signal and that Rafkonian technology has developed to the point where they can destroy Sporix. Knowing the last claim is impossible, a concerned Solon refuses Arla access to the Rangers' Sporix, but an excited Zayto refuses to listen. As Void Knight lures the Rangers away from Dinohenge, a suspicious Solon exposes Slyther, but he subdues her. When the Rangers return, Arla offers to help Zayto find Solon, but he discovers Slyther's identity before assembling with his team to defeat him, forcing Slyther to retreat. Afterwards, Zayto reconciles with Solon.
11	11	"McScary Manor"	Charlie Haskell	Story by : Becca Barnes & Alwyn Dale; Teleplay by : Johnny Hartmann	June 15, 2021 (NF) (Note: This episode was later broadcast on October 2, 2021 on Nickelodeon.)	0.17
"Pop-Pop", Amelia's grandfather, is going to clean an old mansion, but flees after hearing strange noises. Believing it is haunted, he tells Amelia, who investigates, only to discover it was a prank by the Sporix Beast Tombtress. She calls the other Rangers, but the beast uses her ability to temporarily heighten victims' emotions on them and escapes with Mucus' help. While under Tombtress' effects, an angry Amelia ruins Pop-Pop's efforts to find the mansion's keys, though he finds the Blazing Dino Key inside. Relieved of the monster's effects and transforming into her Ranger form, Amelia follows him inside, where he tells her a great secret regarding her missing parents before handing the key to her. She later uses it to awaken the Dimetro Blazing Zord and combine it with the T-Rex Champion Zord to form the T-Rex Blazing Megazord and defeat Tombtress before reconciling with Pop-Pop.
12	12	"Super Hotshot"	Chris Graham	Story by : Alwyn Dale, Becca Barnes, Maiya Thompson & Guy Langford; Teleplay by : Johnny Hartmann	October 9, 2021 (NCK) (Note: This episode was later released on October 15, 2021 on Netflix.)	0.37
Izzy learns of a new gym and convinces Carlos to let her try the free trial despite the expensive membership. Zayto accompanies her to the gym, where they encounter Coach Bella and Izzy's friends Fern and Adrian. Following their first session however, Bella forces Adrian to trade his watch to pay for a mandatory uniform. Meanwhile, Slyther and Mucus hack a cell tower to intercept the Ranger hotline, through which Slyther finds an unhatched Sporix and escapes with it despite the Rangers' interference. Izzy and Zayto return to Bella's gym, but he becomes suspicious after overhearing Bella brown-nosing her clients. Izzy is uncertain, but later realizes the gym is a get-rich-quick scheme and buys Adrian's watch back. On her way out, Izzy learns Carlos discovered a Sporix Beast and called the hotline, but Solon never received the call. She and Javi discover Slyther, Mucus, the Sporix Beast Fogshell, and their plot before destroying the villains' hacking device with their friends' help, forcing the villains to retreat. Afterwards, Izzy returns Adrian's watch and exposes Bella's scheme to her clients.
13	13	"The Matchmaker"	Chris Graham	Story by : Becca Barnes, Alwyn Dale, Guy Langford & Maiya Thompson; Teleplay by : Maiya Thompson	October 15, 2021 (NF) (Note: This episode was later broadcast on October 16, 2021 on Nickelodeon.)	0.25
Javi notices Izzy has been in a good mood lately and, assuming she has a crush on Adrian, sets them up on a date without telling Izzy. However, a disguised Slyther brings Fogshell along to distract the Rangers while he kidnaps Adrian and assumes his form in the hopes of kidnapping Izzy. Later, Javi gets Izzy and the disguised Slyther to come to the same place and leaves them alone. Believing Javi's assumption, Slyther lures her to a secluded location and nearly succeeds, but Izzy escapes. At Dinohenge, she scolds Javi for meddling with her life behind her back before he calls Adrian to discern his location. Slyther answers and demands he bring the Rangers' Sporix in exchange for Adrian. The Rangers use the Double Dino Key to create a fake version of their Sporix chest, which Mucus takes before the Rangers use their own disguises to ambush Slyther into a retreat and rescue Adrian. Fogshell enlarges, but the Rangers use the T-Rex Blazing Megazord to defeat him so Izzy can reclaim his Sporix. Afterwards, an angered Void Knight discovers the Rangers' deception while Javi reconciles with Izzy and Adrian before realizing she is dating Fern.
14	14	"Old Foes"	Chris Graham	Story by : Becca Barnes & Alwyn Dale; Teleplay by : Johnny Hartmann	October 15, 2021 (NF) (Note: This episode was later broadcast on October 23, 2021 on Nickelodeon.)	0.11
Void Knight joins forces with a necromancer named Reaghoul, who has revived Lord Zedd and enslaved him via a compliance collar, to gain more Sporix. Meanwhile, Ollie boasts that he is not afraid of anything, so the other Rangers bet that they can scare him once they make a haunted forest trail for him. After sending him off however, the Rangers are captured by Void Knight, Reaghoul, and Zedd. When Ollie encounters Brineblast and Wolfgang, who were revived by Reaghoul, he overcomes them before facing Zedd, but a concerned Solon teleports Ollie away for fear of Zedd's power. Looking into Zedd’s history via the Legendary Ranger Database, Ollie recognizes the former’s compliance collar before facing him once more and destroying it. Incensed by what Reaghoul did to him, Zedd attacks the necromancer, but he flees. Zedd battles the Rangers and the revived Sporix Beasts instead, only to escape himself upon realizing he does not have his staff. The Rangers defeat Brineblast and Wolfgang once more while Void Knight imprisons Reaghoul for failing him. Ollie realizes his greatest fear is losing his friends before heading to a Halloween party with them.
15	15	"Storm Surge"	Chris Graham	Story by : Becca Barnes, Alwyn Dale & Maiya Thompson; Teleplay by : Maiya Thompson	October 15, 2021 (NF) (Note: This episode was later broadcast on October 30, 2021 on Nickelodeon.)	0.18
After Jane tasks Javi with covering a strange storm over Pine Ridge Bay, Ollie promises to help by letting Javi interview him. To his annoyance, Ollie finds Lani searching for the storm's source using an outdated laptop while Slyther and Mucus secretly observe. When a Sporix Beast called Tidemare attacks, the Rangers mobilize to fight him, but he overpowers them before retreating. Ollie and Javi return to BuzzBlast for their story until a disguised Slyther tricks Ollie into winning a new laptop, derailing the interview. Using the new laptop and an ROV, Javi, Ollie, and Lani locate the storm's source, a stasis pod, but Slyther hacks the laptop to retrieve it for Void Knight. With Solon's help, the Rangers uncover Slyther's plot, but Tidemare defeats them. Slyther and Mucus retrieve the pod, but the original Gold Ranger, Aiyon, emerges from it and defeats Tidemare. As a dumbfounded Zayto brings Tidemare's Sporix back to Dinohenge, the others regroup with Lani and Ollie apologizes to Javi for abandoning him.
16	16	"Ancient History"	Caroline Bell Booth	Story by : Becca Barnes, Alwyn Dale & Guy Langford; Teleplay by : Guy Langford	October 15, 2021 (NF) (Note: This episode was later broadcast on November 6, 2021 on Nickelodeon.)	0.14
Returning to Dinohenge, Aiyon reveals he was separated from Zayto and their original team, warned of Zedd's return by the Green Morphin' Master before he was put in stasis, and the Rafkonians created the Sporix to protect them. All except Zayto are glad to have a new member, but Aiyon refuses to join unless he is named leader because he still holds a grudge against Zayto, who refused to warn his superiors about the Sporix's hazardous properties and stopped him from destroying the Sporix until it was too late. Zayto attempts to explain himself, but the Rangers learn Mucus is attacking the port. They arrive to stop her, but Zayto is incapacitated by a string of bad luck. Aiyon easily defeats Mucus, but she and Slyther escape with a boat, which they later use the parts to build a robot called Wreckmate to destroy Aiyon's Zord. A doubtful Zayto allows Aiyon to lead the others in stopping an enlarged Wreckmate, but Aiyon soon realizes being a leader is harder than he thought, reconciles with Zayto, and joins him in reactivating the Mosa Razor Zord so they can seemingly destroy Wreckmate before handing leadership duties back to Zayto.
17	17	"Our Hero"	Caroline Bell Booth	Story by : Alwyn Dale, Becca Barnes, Guy Langford & Maiya Thompson; Teleplay by : Guy Langford	October 15, 2021 (NF) (Note: This episode was later broadcast on November 13, 2021 on Nickelodeon.)	0.18
As the Rangers help Aiyon acclimate to Earth, they are forced to fight a Sporix Beast called Trawler. However, Aiyon gets distracted showing off for BuzzBlast and gets the others captured. He eventually rescues them before Mucus teleports Trawler away to recruit him into Void Knight's fold. Taking inspiration from Aiyon's showboating, Slyther and Trawler set up a beach party in the Rangers' honor. The Rangers are suspicious, but Aiyon falls for it and is goaded into summoning the Mosa Razor Zord, which Trawler captures so Slyther can hypnotize it into obeying Void Knight. After helping Aiyon realize his mistake, the Rangers battle Trawler while Javi and Aiyon rescue the latter's Zord. When Trawler enlarges, Aiyon combines the Mosa Razor and Dimetro Blazing Zords to form the Electro Zord to help his friends defeat the beast and reclaim his Sporix.
18	18	"Crossed Wires"	Caroline Bell Booth	Story by : Alwyn Dale, Becca Barnes & Guy Langford; Teleplay by : Guy Langford	October 15, 2021 (NF) (Note: This episode was later broadcast on November 20, 2021 on Nickelodeon.)	0.20
Despite failing in her electronics class, Izzy claims the opposite to her friends before they are called to the park after several people are found lying unconscious. Due to a Sporix Beast attack at the chemical plant, Zayto, Ollie, and Amelia break off while the others stay behind to protect the victims. Both parties find a sleep-bomb, with Ollie disarming and recovering his before he, Zayto, and Amelia defeat the Sporix Beast protecting it, Stone-Rad, and reclaim his Sporix. However, Izzy fails to disarm hers, causing Aiyon and Javi to fall asleep despite waking the victims. Upon regrouping at Dinohenge, Izzy confesses her mistake, though Solon and Ollie help her reconfigure Ollie's sleep-bomb to wake Javi and Aiyon. Suddenly, the Rangers learn that Stone-Rad's brothers, Stone-Mad and Stone-Sad, intend to detonate a mega sleep-bomb Void Knight built to put all of Pine Ridge to sleep to avenge Stone-Rad. After Ollie is incapacitated by a hidden sleep-bomb and the Stone brothers enlarge and later fuse together, the Rangers create the Fusion Ultrazord to defeat them while Izzy successfully disarms the sleep-bombs, though Mucus steals the brothers' Sporix.
19	19	"The Makeover"	Michael Hurst	Story by : Becca Barnes & Alwyn Dale; Teleplay by : Maiya Thompson & Guy Langford	October 15, 2021 (NF) (Note: This episode was later broadcast on November 27, 2021 on Nickelodeon.)	0.17
After learning Pop-Pop is going on a date, an overexcited Amelia gives him a makeover. Meanwhile, Void Knight learns the Pine Ridge Museum acquired a pirate chest that potentially contains talismans he can use to power his machine and tasks the Sporix Beast, Boneswitch, with stealing them. The Rangers mobilize to stop the beast, who discovers the chest is empty and destroys it before body swapping all but Izzy and Aiyon. Failing to morph, the affected Rangers are forced to retreat while Aiyon and Izzy drive Boneswitch into doing the same. Due to what happened to them, Amelia convinces a doubtful Zayto to help Pop-Pop for her, but the date goes awry until Zayto tells Pop-Pop to be himself. Solon hypothesizes the Rangers' energies were switched too so they need to use each others' Dino Keys. Learning Boneswitch has returned, the Rangers successfully prove Solon’s theory before reversing Boneswitch's effects and defeating him, though Void Knight claims his Sporix. Following this, Amelia apologizes to Pop-Pop as he rebuilds the chest and discovers it is a map leading to the talismans, which are revealed to be two new Dino Keys buried under Dinohenge.
20	20	"Waking Nightmares"	Michael Hurst	Story by : Alwyn Dale & Becca Barnes; Teleplay by : Guy Langford	October 15, 2021 (NF) (Note: This episode was later broadcast on December 4, 2021 on Nickelodeon.)	0.21
Aiyon and Zayto experience nightmares about their final battle with their original team. The next morning, the Rangers and Lani unearth the Light and Shadow Dino Keys before joining Solon in locating their corresponding Zords. When she finds them on the planet Nibyro, Aiyon combines the new keys to open a portal to the planet, but it proves unstable and closes after Zayto enters and is attacked by apparitions of their fallen teammates. After Lani contacts the Rangers to reveal she has built an energy conductor to tap into the Morphin Grid via Dinohenge, an inspired Aiyon uses Dinohenge to power the Keys and pursue Zayto. Meanwhile, Void Knight's group secretly watch from afar, realize they can use the Morphin Grid instead of Sporix, and free Reaghoul to have him revive Boomtower. Boomtower and Mucus attack the city, forcing the remaining Rangers to stop them. Aiyon and Zayto realize the apparitions are their nightmares given physical form and use their good memories to pacify them, passing the planetary guardian's test and receiving the Light and Shadow Raptor Zords before returning to Earth to defeat Boomtower. Following this however, Solon informs the Rangers that Void Knight stole Lani's equipment.
21	21	"Void Trap"	Michael Hurst	Story by : Becca Barnes & Alwyn Dale; Teleplay by : Maiya Thompson	October 15, 2021 (NF) (Note: This episode was later broadcast on December 11, 2021 on Nickelodeon.)	0.23
As the Rangers deduce Void Knight's plan, they realize he does not have Lani's capacitor and ask her to help them give him a sabotaged one, which Ollie reluctantly allows. Meanwhile, Reaghoul resurrects Boomtower once more as Void Knight discovers the missing capacitor and sends his minions to kidnap Lani. The Rangers' plan succeeds, but Reaghoul sends himself, Slyther, Mucus, and Lani to another dimension. Zayto summons and combines the T-Rex Champion and Cosmic Combo Raptor Zords to form the T-Rex Cosmic Megazord and pursue them while the remaining Rangers destroy Boomtower. Despite Zayto’s successful attempt in destroying Reaghoul and rescuing Lani, Void Knight captures all of the Rangers save Ollie and connects them to Dr. Akana's equipment, Santaura's pod, and Dinohenge to access the Morphin' Grid. Against Ollie's concerns, Lani distracts Void Knight so Ollie can destroy Dinohenge, inadvertently severing the Rangers' connection to the Morphin' Grid and exposing their identities. After getting Lani to safety, the Rangers fight Void Knight before destroying his machine, seemingly killing him. Suddenly, the Green Morphin' Master restores Dinohenge and the Rangers' powers in preparation for a new threat.
22	22	"Secret Santa"	Caroline Bell Booth	Story by : Guy Langford, Maiya Thompson, Alwyn Dale & Becca Barnes; Teleplay by : Johnny Hartmann	October 15, 2021 (NF) (Note: This episode was later broadcast on December 18, 2021 on Nickelodeon.)	0.22
After escaping Reaghoul's dimension and learning of Void Knight's fate, Slyther and Mucus seek revenge by secretly giving Javi a bomb disguised as a tree-topper. Meanwhile, Javi struggles to find a Christmas present for Solon and tells his friends, who leave to help him while he stays at Dinohenge to read Christmas cards with Solon. However, he unknowingly opens a booby-trapped card that disables Dinohenge and activates the bomb. He and Solon open the gifts, believing the bomb is hidden amongst them, but fail to find it until they realize it is the tree-topper. With seconds left, she puts the bomb in their Sporix chest, which safely contains the explosion and restores Dinohenge's power. Concurrently, Santa Claus asks the other Rangers for help when his magic sketchbook goes missing. They encounter Slyther and Mucus, who use the book to create monsters to fight the Rangers, though they summon their Megazords to destroy them and the sketchbook. With the villains foiled, the Rangers have a gift exchange at Dinohenge, where Javi gives Solon a songbook to help her learn Christmas carols.

=== Season 2 (2022) ===
No. overall	No. in season	Title	Directed by	Written by	Original release date
23	1	"Numero Uno"	Charlie Haskell	Story by : Becca Barnes, Alwyn Dale & Maiya Thompson; Teleplay by : Johnny Hartmann	March 3, 2022
Amelia struggles with fulfilling her Ranger duties and helping Fairview and her android assistant, J-Borg, with a video tour while the other Rangers try to locate Rafkon. Meanwhile, Slyther and Mucus receive word that Void Knight is still alive from the Sporix Beast Bitscreem, who attacks the Rangers and steals their Fix-It Dino Key. Suspecting Void Knight may be still alive, the Rangers re-examine security footage of Bitscreem, Mucus, and a disguised Slyther. Realizing Bitscreem was spying on them, the team attempts to destroy Void Knight's sword, but Amelia gets distracted by her job and the plan fails when the enemy force manages to steal back the sword. As such, Zayto forms the T-Rex Cosmic Megazord to defeat Bitscreem, though Void Knight reveals himself after repairing his armor with the Fix-It Key and makes off with Bitscreem's Sporix before resuming his plans. Afterwards, Amelia learns that Fairview and J-Borg's footage was destroyed, leaving her free to focus on her Ranger duties.
24	2	"The Festival"	Robyn Grace	Story by : Alwyn Dale, Becca Barnes; Teleplay by : Johnny Hartmann	March 3, 2022
Having survived his previous encounter with the Rangers, Wreckmate returns to Void Knight and competes with Slyther to see who can defeat the most Rangers, with Wreckmate stealing a potion from Slyther to help accomplish this. Meanwhile, the Rangers are celebrating the Triple Sun Festival, a Rafkonian tradition, during which Aiyon receives a motorcycle while Zayto receives "Dino Chucks". However, as the others leave to cook for the event, Aiyon secretly plays with the weapon and breaks it, allowing Wreckmate to defeat the Rangers in battle later on. They check the Legendary Ranger Database for inspiration on a new weapon, but are short on supplies to make one. Aiyon, making good on his earlier mistake, offers his motorcycle so Zayto and Solon can reconfigure it into the Dino Fury Cycle, which Zayto uses to defeat Wreckmate once more, forcing the enemy to retreat. Afterwards, the Rangers resume their festivities.
25	3	"Missing Pieces"	Charlie Haskell	Story by : Becca Barnes, Alwyn Dale & Maiya Thompson; Teleplay by : Guy Langford	March 3, 2022
A Sporix Beast named Occulo joins Void Knight's group in finding the remaining Sporix while the Rangers continue searching for Rafkon. Izzy and Javi find a Sporix, but Occulo overpowers and outwits them both before Slyther alters all the Rangers’ memories with an amulet, allowing the villains to steal the Sporix. When the Rangers return, Solon suspects that their memories were tampered with and tries to fix them, but they decline her help. Meanwhile, Zayto heads off to find Rafkon in the T-Rex Cosmic Megazord, but only finds a beacon in space. Back on Earth, Occulo strikes again, with the remaining Rangers heading out to engage him while trying to call Zayto back to Earth. After being rejoined with Zayto, who restores his comrades' memories and his own, the Rangers engage Occulo, Mucus, and Slyther, but Void Knight overpowers them all and leaves with a huge stash of Sporix. Afterwards, the Rangers reconcile with Solon and resume their investigations surrounding Rafkon while Void Knight orders his group to accelerate his plan's progress.
26	4	"Tiny Trouble"	Charlie Haskell	Story by : Becca Barnes, Alwyn Dale & Maiya Thompson; Teleplay by : Maiya Thompson	March 3, 2022
While searching for more Sporix, Occulo stumbles across the Rangers finding a tiny Zord amidst training practice. Upon learning of Occulo's discovery, Void Knight orders him and Wreckmate to take the Zord hostage in exchange for the Rangers' Sporix. In the ensuing chaos, the Zord runs away, forcing Aiyon and Ollie to find it. In the process, Solon discovers the Zord is actually the offspring of the Pacha Smash Zord. The two Rangers find it trapped in a cliff before freeing it while the remaining Rangers struggle against the monsters. Aiyon enters the battle and engages an enlarged Occulo in his Megazord, but is overpowered. Meanwhile, Ollie uses the Dino Smash Key to defeat Wreckmate and free his comrades. The united team summon and use their Megazords along with the Pacha Smash Zord to defeat Occulo, but Void Knight claims his Sporix. Afterwards, a humbled Aiyon promises to be more receptive to advice while Void Knight receives enough power to activate his machine and revive Santaura.
27	5	"Stitched Up"	Robyn Grace	Story by : Alwyn Dale, Becca Barnes, Maiya Thompson & Guy Langford; Teleplay by : Maiya Thompson	March 3, 2022
Void Knight, real name Tarrick, tends to Santaura, intending to leave Earth with her after she recovers. Meanwhile, Fern and Izzy prepare for their school's prom. Izzy gets a dress, much to her disgust, and dumps it when a Sporix Beast named Junkalo launches an assault on the city's dumpster. The Rangers gather to fight him, but are overwhelmed by his stench. Izzy discovers her mother Rina accidentally gave her Fern's dress, which Javi finds at the dumpster, now ruined. Izzy explains the situation to her mother, but the latter forgives her and the two decide to make a new dress for Fern. When Tarrick sends Junkalo to fight the Rangers again, the Rangers summon their Megazord to defeat him and claim his Sporix, unaware that Tarrick has obtained the materials and data he needs for his new invention, the Zord Jammer. Days later, Fern and Izzy head off to the prom, with Izzy's friends escorting them there.
28	6	"Jam Session"	Robyn Grace	Story by : Alwyn Dale & Becca Barnes; Teleplay by : Johnny Hartman, Becca Barnes & Alwyn Dale	March 3, 2022
Santaura pulls a Sporix from Tarrick's machine and asks him to use it to gain more power, but he refuses. He starts to return the Sporix, but Doomsnake re-hatches from it. As Slyther finishes building the Zord Jammer, Tarrick tasks him and Doomsnake with fighting the Rangers. Meanwhile, Javi realizes the leader of his favorite band, Blair, has the Freeze Dino Key, which Zayto reveals can help them locate the missing Ptera Freeze Zord. The Rangers are called in to fight Tarrick and Doomsnake, but when Slyther activates the Zord Jammer and the Rangers fail to summon their Zords, Ollie forces the villains to retreat while the Rangers regroup to find the Ptera Freeze Zord. Javi returns to Blair and asks for the key, but the latter refuses unless Javi serves as a replacement guitarist for an upcoming show. Javi agrees, and gets the key despite earning Carlos' ire, though they later reconcile. Together, the Rangers find the Ptera Freeze Zord, fight off Tarrick's forces, defeat Doomsnake, reclaim his Sporix, and destroy the Zord Jammer. Concurrently, Santaura uses energy from the Sporix to transform herself into Void Queen.
29	7	"New Leaf"	Robyn Grace	Story by : Becca Barnes, Alwyn Dale & Maiya Thompson; Teleplay by : Maiya Thompson	March 3, 2022
Void Queen initiates her plan to exact revenge on humanity, summoning the Sporix Beast Squashblight from Tarrick’s machine for the task. Meanwhile, Ollie encounters his school professor Drake Floyd, but he belittles Amelia's magnetic brace, causing Floyd to call him out on his rudeness. Squashblight begins his rampage, turning people into trees by poisoning Pine Ridge's water supply with his venom and repelling the Rangers' assaults. Later, Ollie develops an antidote with Amelia and Solon, but Solon falls victim to Squashblight's venom when Ollie dismisses Amelia's warnings concerning a boiling sample while Void Queen abuses Tarrick. Amelia uses her invention to complete the antidote and cure Solon just as Squashblight resumes his attack, accompanied by Wreckmate. The Rangers attempt to engage both villains, but are overpowered until Tarrick arrives and tells them that Squashblight is susceptible to darkness as the Sporix Beast enlarges. The Rangers form the Ptera Smash Ultrazord and knock Squashblight into a thunderstorm he created to defeat him and claim his Sporix while Zayto cures the rest of the victims. Afterwards, Ollie apologizes to Floyd for his flippancy while his friends struggle to determine why Tarrick helped them.
30	8	"Serious Business"	Caroline Bell Booth	Story by : Alwyn Dale & Becca Barnes; Teleplay by : Johnny Hartman	March 3, 2022
Upon learning of Tarrick's actions, an angry Santaura releases the Sporix Beast Trackenslash to find him. Meanwhile, a disguised Tarrick heads to BuzzBlast and overhears the Rangers discussing his trustworthiness, with Zayto believing he cannot be trusted, just as BuzzBlast is attacked by a hacker demanding their own show. The Rangers start to investigate when Solon warns them of Trackenslash's arrival, and they head out to engage him, Mucus, and Slyther. The beast overwhelms the Rangers, but Santaura reminds him and the other villains to focus on their mission and they obey. Returning to their investigation, the Rangers eventually locate the hacker, a little girl named Mara, who admits that she has always wanted to be on BuzzBlast, but was deemed too young. Aiyon convinces her not to waste her talents on criminal pursuits and apologize to everyone at BuzzBlast. Later, the Rangers re-encounter Trackenslash, but he overpowers them once more until Tarrick arrives to help Zayto defeat the beast and reclaim his Sporix. The Rangers are still distrustful of Tarrick, who says he does not want the Sporix anymore and promises that he will attempt to recover the ones he stole to prove himself to them.
31	9	"The Hunt"	Caroline Bell Booth	Story by : Alwyn Dale & Becca Barnes; Teleplay by : Maiya Thompson	March 3, 2022
Void Queen orders creation of a new robotic general, Snageye, to capture the Rangers while Tarrick unsuccessfully tries to steal more Sporix after nearly getting caught. Meanwhile, Amelia begins investigating a supposed ghost sighting when Solon calls the Rangers to the warehouse district. There, they meet Tarrick, who explains Void Queen's plans, her new general, and her origins, before offering to help them defeat her, though a skeptical Zayto refuses. The Rangers return to find the ghost, when Snageye attacks, trapping Izzy, Amelia, Ollie, and Aiyon in a pocket dimension while Zayto and Javi retreat to discuss Tarrick. When the two meet him again, Snageye traps the remaining Rangers, but Zayto telepathically sees Tarrick fighting Snageye and witnesses Tarrick's heroism just as Tarrick frees him and hands him the Dino Knight Morpher and its accompanying key. With the new equipment in hand, Zayto equips his Dino Knight Armor to destroy Snageye and free his comrades, but Void Queen captures Tarrick. Afterwards, the Rangers ponder Tarrick's change of heart and Void Queen's plans while Zayto notes that people can change and the "ghost" is revealed to be a drone in a tarp.
32	10	"Losers Weepers"	Caroline Bell Booth	Story by : Becca Barnes, Alwyn Dale & Guy Langford; Teleplay by : Guy Langford	March 3, 2022
While cycling through the forest, Aiyon and Izzy stumble across a truck from Area 62 and a case containing a strange collar and wads of cash. They argue over what to do with the money while Void Queen summons the Sporix Beast Flapnarok. Using the collar Mucus found, Flapnarok enlarges immediately and overpowers the Rangers and their Megazords. Meanwhile, Aiyon goes on a shopping spree until he meets Pop-Pop, who reveals he lost his disco shirt and gives him advice about genuine happiness and honesty. Inspired by this, Aiyon hands his shirt to Pop-Pop and gives away his products for free while the others discuss forming the Primal Ultrazord, a dangerous Zord combination which killed Aiyon and Zayto's original comrades in the past. Aiyon and the Rangers regroup to complete adjustments to the Ultrazord just as Flapnarok strikes again. In response, the Rangers deploy and form the Primal Ultrazord to defeat the monster. Afterwards, Izzy and Aiyon reconcile, the latter having used the last of the money to get Izzy a new bike.
33	11	"The Copycat"	Robyn Grace	Story by : Alwyn Dale & Becca Barnes; Teleplay by : Guy Langford	March 3, 2022
Javi enters BuzzBlast's song competition, but is forced to make a new song after Blair steals his original one. Meanwhile, Void Queen brainwashes Tarrick to her side by transforming him into Void King, and sends him to the city's stadium to cause chaos. The Rangers head out to engage the new enemy, but are overpowered, with all but Javi and Zayto getting injured. Back at Dinohenge, they discuss Void King's tactic of copying their moves and train against each other to find a weakness, discovering the Dino Knight Morpher's finisher can only be used once per transformation. Just then, Void King resumes his attack, with Zayto donning his Dino Knight Armor to engage him solo. Using what he learned from his training, Zayto defeats Void King, forcing the latter to retreat. Afterwards, the other four Rangers show signs of recovery and Javi uses his electric guitar, harmonica, and keytar for his song, winning the competition.
34	12	"Ultimate Mystery"	Robyn Grace	Story by : Becca Barnes & Alwyn Dale; Teleplay by : Johnny Hartman	September 29, 2022
During an interview, Amelia and two of her BuzzBlast colleagues receive word about a supposed Bigfoot sighting. She tries to tell Fairview about her find, but is turned down, causing the three to decide to investigate Bigfoot themselves. Just then, Solon assembles the Rangers and reveals that General Shaw contacted them to warn them of a breakout in Grid Battleforce. The Rangers are deployed to fight a monster that arrived at Pine Ridge, but are overpowered by the enemy, who introduces himself as Lothorn, Lokar's nephew. Returning to base, the Rangers struggle to determine Lothorn's purpose while Amelia's colleagues find him trying to destroy Dinohenge's statues. The Rangers scramble to save the civilians before engaging an enlarged Lothorn, summoning the Primal Ultrazord to help destroy the monster. Afterwards, Amelia apologizes to Fairview while Shaw reveals Scrozzle had been freed and Lord Zedd caused the breakout.
35	13	"Love Hate"	Robyn Grace	Story by : Alwyn Dale & Becca Barnes; Teleplay by : Maiya Thompson	September 29, 2022
On Valentine's Day, Ollie intends to ask Amelia to be his Valentine, but a misunderstanding ensues between them. Meanwhile, having reclaimed his staff, Zedd returns to Area 62 with Scrozzle and robotic ally Sizzurai, claiming he wants to form an alliance with Void King and Queen to conquer Earth. Using data he preserved from Boomtower and Snageye, Void King tasks Scrozzle with building upgraded versions to aid them. While they wait, Zedd and Sizzurai attack the Rangers, with the latter brainwashing Ollie to make him collect information on Rafkon. As Solon alerts the Rangers to Zedd's return, the Rangers mobilize to stop him, only to face Void King, new general Boomblaster, and Ollie. The Rangers use the Snooze Dino Key to put Ollie to sleep and bring him back to Dinohenge so Solon can cure him while Zayto and Amelia hold off their enemies until Boomblaster leaves to help Zedd, followed by a suspicious Void King. As he and Void Queen learn Zedd betrayed them and left Earth with the robots they built him, the Rangers and Solon awaken Ollie, who reconciles with Amelia before Zayto uses his telepathy on him to discover Zedd's plot to reach Rafkon.
36	14	"Rafkon Revealed"	Chris Graham	Story by : Becca Barnes & Alwyn Dale; Teleplay by : Maiya Thompson	September 29, 2022
With the information Zayto received, the Rangers finally pinpoint Rafkon's location to stop Zedd. While the Rangers head off, Zedd and his minions scour the planet for the Sporix generator, intending to use it to create their own army of Sporix Beasts. Upon arriving and eager to fulfill his duty, Aiyon launches an attack on Zedd, his new robotic general Nulleye, and the rest of their group, only for Zayto to call him out for his lack of teamwork afterwards. The Rangers continue searching for the Sporix generator using information they overheard from Zedd and his generals earlier. However, the team is ambushed by the villains after finding it. In the ensuing battle, Zayto blocks a laser attack from Zedd's staff, inadvertently directing it to Sizzurai and destroying him while Zedd and Scrozzle work on the machine. Aiyon tries to engage Zedd, but is overpowered, with Zayto getting injured trying to protect him. With Zayto and Aiyon incapacitated, the Rangers are cornered by Zedd before they are suddenly teleported out of the fight. Back at Dinohenge, Aiyon laments his rash actions costing his team the mission and Zayto's health when the Green Morphin' Master appears to them.
37	15	"Morphin Master"	Chris Graham	Story by : Alwyn Dale & Becca Barnes; Teleplay by : Maiya Thompson	September 29, 2022
The Green Morphin' Master heals Zayto before giving the Rangers a new weapon to fight Zedd. However, the Blue Morphin' Master stops her, warning her that she has intervened too many times. Zayto tries to defend Green's actions, citing three events where she helped past Ranger teams, but Blue is unconvinced, mentioning that their comrades were killed by new villains every time they made a new team. With the new equipment in hand, the Rangers return to Rafkon to stop Zedd, who succeeds in stealing and escaping with the Sporix generator. The Rangers narrowly escape themselves before Rafkon explodes and return to Earth to stop Zedd. Over the course of the battle, Aiyon destroys Boomblaster while Scrozzle, Nulleye, and Void King escape. With Aiyon's help, the Green Morphin' Master sacrifices herself to imprison Zedd with her in a crystal and destroy the Sporix generator. Seeing the error of their ways, the Red and Blue Morphin' Masters free her and take Zedd away while Zayto accepts Earth as his and Aiyon's new home.
38	16	"Wishful Thinking"	Chris Graham	Story by : Becca Barnes & Alwyn Dale; Teleplay by : Guy Langford	September 29, 2022
Javi tries unsuccessfully to make a music video for BuzzBlast. His friends take him for a walk in the park when they see a human Mucus selling wish charms. Each Ranger makes a wish, with Javi suddenly getting millions of views. However, they discover that their wishes, actually made reality by a Sporix Beast named Hexcurio, have unexpected side effects. The Rangers try to fight the monster, but his allies overpower them, forcing them to withdraw while J-Borg and Fairview discover another musician, Pete Flash, arriving in town for a performance with Javi, leaving Javi torn between helping the Rangers break the wish charms’ magic and his performance with Pete until Lani encourages him to work hard to achieve his dreams. Taking her lesson to heart, Javi helps his allies attack the enemy. When Hexcurio enlarges, the Rangers summon their Zords to defeat him, breaking his curse over his victims, though Mucus, who was reverted to her normal form, claims his Sporix. Afterwards, Pete and Javi perform their duet while Amelia is crestfallen over her wish to see her parents seemingly being left unfulfilled.
39	17	"Things Unspoken"	Charlie Haskell	Story by : Alwyn Dale & Becca Barnes; Teleplay by : Maiya Thompson	September 29, 2022
As Izzy learns that Fern has been accepted into college, a Sporix Beast named Quickspine suddenly attacks, forcing the former to leave Fern to fight him with her comrades. Amidst the battle, Izzy saves Fern and Carlos from Hengemen, but has to hide her identity when Fern confesses to her that she loves her, unaware of her true identity. Withdrawing to Dinohenge, the Rangers discuss ways to counter Quickspine's speed while Izzy worries over Fern texting her. When they meet again, the two argue over Izzy keeping secrets from Fern when Carlos chastises Izzy for turning down the college's offer, leaving Izzy lost on how to explain herself without revealing her Ranger duties. Suddenly, Quickspine attacks again, stealing Carlos's key and injuring him. The Rangers assemble to fight him again, successfully slowing him down. When Quickspine enlarges, the Rangers summon the Primal Ultrazord to defeat him, but Void Queen claims his Sporix and the key he stole. Afterwards, the Rangers visit Carlos as he recuperates from his injury and Izzy and Fern reconcile, the latter having deduced Izzy is the Green Ranger.
40	18	"Guilt Trip"	Charlie Haskell	Story by : Becca Barnes & Alwyn Dale; Teleplay by : Maiya Thompson	September 29, 2022
While planning a romantic getaway, Ollie neglects Lani to spend more time with Amelia until the Rangers are informed of the Sporix Beast Sugarhit being sighted in Osaka, Japan. Joined by Aiyon and amidst their search for the monster, Aiyon encounters Lani, who is disappointed her son did not meet her as planned, before encountering the beast. The enemy buffets Aiyon before retreating when his comrades assist him. As the others discuss Sugarhit attacking Osaka, Lani chides Ollie for remaining out of touch and neglecting his work. Later that day, Amelia and another professor also call out Ollie for neglecting his mother. Suddenly, Sugarhit strikes again. The Rangers pinpoint his location to a Japanese village and rush over to engage him. When Sugarhit enlarges, the Rangers summon their Zords to defeat him, with Ollie claiming his Sporix. Afterwards, Ollie apologizes to his mother, promising to redo his work and he and his friends continue their vacation. Concurrently, Void King and Queen and their minions try and fail to activate drill machines underground back in Pine Ridge.
41	19	"Bad Vibes"	Charlie Haskell	Story by : Alwyn Dale & Becca Barnes; Teleplay by : Johnny Hartman	September 29, 2022
As Carlos finishes work on a drill for Pine Ridge's sewage system, Void King unveils the Sporix Blaster, a weapon that can brainwash its targets. Meanwhile, Javi and Izzy try to find a new activity for their family when Solon alerts them of Wreckmate attacking the city. The Rangers transform and deploy to fight him, but Nulleye suddenly attacks them with the Sporix Blaster, hitting Izzy and Javi before Aiyon destroys the gun. The Rangers retreat to Dinohenge, where a brainwashed Izzy and Javi try to seize their Sporix chest, forcing their comrades to drive them out. Following Void Queen's instructions, the two brainwashed Rangers find out the passcode for the drill from Carlos and successfully activates it, with Void King programming it to tunnel towards Dinohenge's underground base. Meanwhile, Nulleye and the Sporix Beast Clawfare engage the remaining Rangers while Carlos and Rina engage in a karaoke session. Zayto destroys Nulleye. As Izzy and Javi listen to their parents' singing, their brainwashing is undone, allowing them to rejoin their comrades and summon the Primal Ultrazord to defeat Clawfare. However, Void Queen claims his Sporix and Void King arrives at Dinohenge with the drill, injuring Solon and making off with the Rangers' Sporix chest.
42	20	"The Invasion"	Craig Wilson	Story by : Becca Barnes & Alwyn Dale; Teleplay by : Guy Langford, Cameron Dixon & Steve McCleary	September 29, 2022
The Rangers meet a group of Rafkonians led by Orria, who intend to attack Earth under the belief that all humans are evil. Meanwhile, Void Queen releases all of the Sporix and initiates a wide-scale assault on Pine Ridge, forcing the Rafkonians and the Rangers to work together to fight them. Zayto and Aiyon fight a Sporix Beast named Crashflood to stop him from flooding Pine Ridge while the others fight Wreckmate and other Sporix Beasts. During the fight, Fogshell tries to attack Orria, but Pop-Pop defends her, getting injured in the process. As Orria changes her mind about humans, Pop-Pop discovers that Amelia is the Pink Ranger and admits that when he worked in Area 62, he encountered a pair of aliens, who asked him to take care of an infant Amelia for them.
43	21	"The Truth"	Simon Bennett	Alwyn Dale & Becca Barnes	September 29, 2022
Amelia discovers that she is a surviving Rafkonian like Zayto and Aiyon, who are proud to learn that they have been fighting together all along. The Rangers work with the other Rafkonians defeat the Sporix Beasts. However, Void Queen uses the Sporix to create a cocoon around herself. While the Rangers fight and destroy an enlarged Wreckmate, Amelia travels to Area 62 to learn the truth about her parents. Slyther attacks her, but the Rangers save her, forcing Slyther to flee. Void King attacks them, but Amelia throws herself onto him and discovers he and Santaura are her parents. Void King, upon realizing this revelation, is freed from Void Queen's brainwashing and reverts to Tarrick.
44	22	"The Nemesis"	Simon Bennett	Becca Barnes & Alwyn Dale	September 29, 2022
Tarrick uses the Dino Knight Morpher to transform into Void Knight one last time and teleport the cocoon out to a desert to prevent Pine Ridge's destruction. However, Void Queen uses the cocoon to create the Nemesis Beast. As the Rangers fight her, Zayto sacrifices himself and the Zords to weaken the beast. Void Queen attempts to kill the remaining Rangers and Tarrick, but Amelia appeals to her better nature and reveals the truth, causing Void Queen to forgo her revenge, destroy the Nemesis Beast, and revert to Santaura. The Morphin' Masters capture all but one of the Sporix in a crystal, unaware that Mucus escaped. Despite asking the Morphin Masters to revive Zayto, they tell the Rangers that he will live on in their memory, forcing them to accept their leader's sacrifice. Six months later, the Rafkonians make Area 62 their new home, Pop-Pop and Amelia prepare Tarrick and Santaura for the arrival of their new daughter, Mucus and Slyther have taken on human disguises and began running a circus together, the Garcia siblings become famous after Izzy's graduation, and Aiyon opens his own Rafkonian-themed café. The Rangers are called to the base and are reunited with a revived Zayto, who warns his team that Zedd has escaped, forcing them to morph back into action.

== Production ==
In an interview with Den of Geek, Executive Producer Simon Bennett said that Dino Fury was originally planned to be one 22-episode season before a second season was picked up and 22 additional episodes were ordered. Bennett said the additional episodes were to "plug the gaps" between episodes that were already written, while the overall storyline remained the same. Bennett said that beginning with Dino Fury, serialized episodes were allowed to be written, saying prior to Dino Fury standalone episodes were mandated apart from the first two episodes and last two episodes.

=== Music ===
Bert Selen composed the score. Selen also co-wrote and performed the theme song, which included lyrics of "Go Go Power Rangers" by Ron Wasserman.

A 35-track soundtrack album was released by Hasbro in July 12, 2024.

== Reception ==
=== Accolades ===
Year	Award	Category	Recipient	Result	Ref.
2022	GLAAD Media Awards	Outstanding Kids and Family Programming	Power Rangers Dino Fury	Won	
2023	GLAAD Media Awards	Outstanding Kids and Family Programming	Power Rangers Dino Fury	Nominated	

== Item ==
- Power Rangers Crystal Force

Crystal Morpher
Crystal Blaster
Crystal Sword
Crystal Force Blaster
Crystal Silver Morpher
Crystal Silver Drill Blaster
Crystal Super Bow

- Power Rangers MAX

MAX Gatling Morpher
MAX Buckle
Power Rangers Gear
MAX Pirates Morpher
MAX Pirates Buckle
MAX Dinosaurs Gear
MAX Power Cannon

- Power Rangers Momotaro

Momotaro Morpher Blaster
Momotaro Buckle
Momotaro Sword
Momotaro Gear
Soungoku Morpher Staff
Soungoku Gauntlet
Portable Shrine Phoenix

- Power Rangers Kingdom Force

Kingdom Force Morpher Saber
Kingdom Force Weapon
Kingdom Force Smart Phone Buckle
Spider Morpher Dagger
Spider Hand Blaster
Spider Key
Spider Key Holder
King Dino Saber
Kingdom Clown Lance

- Power Rangers Accele

Accele Morpher
Accele Handle
Accele Morpher Ax
Accele Morpher Controller
Accele Morpher Fire Blaster

- Power Rangers Champion

Champion Morpher Sword
Champion Buckle
Lion Blaster
T-Rex Hamner
Eagle Bow
Unicorn Drill
Wolf Saber
Champion Morpher Knuckle
Polar Bear Glove
Power Rangers Ring
Champion Morpher Blaster
Power Rangers Ring Box
Champion Morpher Sword Universe
Orca Blaster
Twin Champion Morpher Sword
