= Power Rangers Cosmic Fury =

2023 American television series

- Series logo
- Genre: Action; Adventure; Science fiction; Superhero
- Created by: Haim Saban; Toei Company
- Based on: Kishiryu Sentai Ryusoulger & Uchu Sentai Kyuranger by Toei Company
- Developed by: Hasbro/Entertainment One; Toei Company
- Showrunner: Simon Bennett
- Written by: Becca Barnes; Alwyn Dale; Guy Langford; Maiya Thompson; Cameron Dixon; Steve McCleary
- Directed by: Charlie Haskell; Michael Hurst
- Creative directors: Becca Barnes; Alwyn Dale
- Starring: See "Cast"
- Theme music composer: Bert Selen
- Opening theme: "Power Rangers Cosmic Fury" by Bert Selen
- Composer: Bert Selen
- Countries of origin: United States; Canada; Japan
- Original language: English
- No. of seasons: 1
- No. of episodes: 10

Production
- Executive producers: Simon Bennett; Olivier Dumont; Kari Rosenberg; Randi Yaffa; Haim Saban
- Production locations: New Zealand (Auckland Region) (Auckland); Japan (Greater Tokyo Area) (Tokyo, Saitama, Yokohama, Gunma) and Kyoto)
- Cinematography: Ollie Jones; (DOP); Drew Sturge; (Camera Operator/DOP); Ayrton Winitana; (Camera Operator/DOP)
- Camera setup: Single-camera
- Running time: 22 minutes
- Production companies: Entertainment One; Power Rangers Productions; Toei Company

Original release
- Network: Netflix
- Release: September 29, 2023

Related
- Power Rangers television series

Power Rangers Cosmic Fury is a television series and the twenty-third entry of the Power Rangers franchise. The season premiered on Netflix on September 29, 2023.

Cosmic Fury uses some footage from Uchu Sentai Kyuranger, while using new suits with modified helmets carried over from Kishiryu Sentai Ryusoulger, with minimal costume and prop elements being recycled from Doubutsu Sentai Zyuohger and Kaitou Sentai Lupinranger VS Keisatsu Sentai Patranger. It is a follow-up to Power Rangers Dino Fury and the second and last television series produced by Entertainment One following its acquisition by Hasbro in 2019, before it was changed to Lionsgate Canada.

According to executive producer Simon Bennett, Cosmic Fury was intended to be the final series set in the franchise continuity that started with the original Mighty Morphin Power Rangers in 1993, with Hasbro instead opting for a franchise reboot. These reboot plans were initially developed alongside Netflix, but in 2024, Hasbro began searching for a new creative partner. In 2025, the reboot resumed production under 20th Television for release on Disney+, with Hasbro Entertainment producing the series on behalf of 20th Television. The plans for reboot series were shelved by Disney in the following year, leaving the fate of the franchise uncertain as for now.

It received four nominations at the 2024 Kids' Choice Awards, as well as a nomination at the 35th GLAAD Media Awards for Outstanding Kids and Family Programming.

== Plot ==
The emperor of evil, Lord Zedd has returned more powerful than ever, but a team of heroes, Cosmic Fury Power Rangers, stands in his way. The events of finale set up Mighty Morphin Power Rangers: Once & Always.

== Cast and characters ==
=== Rangers ===
- Russell Curry as Zayto, the Red Dino Fury Ranger / Zenith Dino Fury Ranger / Zenith Cosmic Fury Ranger / Zenith Morphin Master.
- Hunter Deno as Amelia Jones, the Pink Dino Fury Ranger / Red Cosmic Fury Ranger.
- Kai Moya as Ollie Akana, the Blue Dino Fury Ranger / Blue Dino Fury Evil Ranger / Blue Cosmic Fury Ranger.
- Tessa Rao as Izzy Garcia, the Green Dino Fury Ranger / Green Cosmic Fury Ranger.
- Chance Perez as Javi Garcia, the Black Dino Fury Ranger / Black Cosmic Fury Ranger.
- Jordon Fite as Aiyon, the Gold Dino Fury Ranger / Gold Cosmic Fury Ranger.
- Jacqueline Joe as Fern, the Orange Cosmic Fury Ranger.
- David Yost as Billy Cranston, the Mighty Morphin Blue Ranger.
- Kelson Henderson as Mick Kanic, the Ninja Steel Red Ranger II

=== Supporting characters ===
- Shavaughn Ruakere as Dr. Lani Akana
- Blair Strang as Warden Carlos Garcia
- Saraid de Silva as Rina Garcia
- Josephine Davison as the voice of Solon
- Kira Josephson as Jane Fairview
- Victoria Abbott as J-Borg
- Jared Turner as Tarrick
- Greg Johnson as Ed "Pop-Pop" Jones
- Torum Heng as the voice and human form of Mucus
- Campbell Cooley as the voice and human form of Slyther
  - Brooke Williams as the voice of Squillia Nair (Slyther's disguise)

=== Villains ===
- Fred Tatasciore as the voice of Lord Zedd / Master Zedd
- Amanda Billing as the voice of Bajillia Naire
- Brooke Williams as the voice of Squillia Naire
- Chris Howden as the voice of Inkworth
- Campbell Cooley as the voice of Scrozzle
- Mark Wright as the voice of Doodrip
- Ashton Brown as the voice of Jozotic
- Joseph Witkowski as the voice of Omwhyzo
- Robert Mignault as the voice of Krymzo
- Lori Dungey as the voice of Snoutia
- Riley Druce as the voice of Quaddo
- Cristina Ionda as the voice of Jadana

=== Guest stars ===
- Ryan Carter as Heckyl, the Dino Charge Dark Ranger
- Daryl Habraken as the voice of Red Morphin Master
- Kevin Keys as the voice of Blue Morphin Master
- Beth Allen as the voice of Green Morphin Master
- Teuila Blakely as General Shaw
- Susan Brady as the voice of Rita Repulsa

== Episodes ==
No.	Title	Directed by	Written by	Original release date
1	"Lightning Strikes"	Michael Hurst	Story by : Alwyn Dale & Becca Barnes; Teleplay by : Maiya Thompson, Becca Barnes & Alwyn Dale	September 29, 2023
Following Zayto's warning about Lord Zedd's escape, the Dino Fury Rangers teleport to his last known location, Zordnia. Fighting off an army of monsters, they receive help from Billy Cranston and Mick Kanic. Zedd, with aid from Bajillia and Squillia Naire’s new invention, eventually emerges, bringing in another monster named Doodrip, who sprays the Rangers with a blue poison that corrupts Ollie again. The now-evil Ollie opens a Cosmic Gateway with the Cosmic Dino Key, sending Zayto through it to an unknown planet. The Morphin Masters try to help the remaining Rangers, but they are captured by Scrozzle's latest invention, the Master Captivator; however, Master Red is able to throw his staff to Javi. As the team ponder over their next actions following their defeat, Billy and Mick recognize an altar that Javi saw in a vision from Master Red’s staff. Suddenly, Ollie strikes again. Amidst the resulting battle, Javi plunges the staff into the altar to summon a fleet of new Zords, losing his right arm in the process. With the new Zords, the Rangers, sans a traumatized Javi, form the Cosmic Fury Megazord to defeat the enemy before retreating, while Amelia attempts to reach out to Ollie before knocking him out and taking him to safety just as enemy reinforcements arrive. Afterwards, everyone tries to make a plan for the future, while Billy reflects on the Rangers' resolve.
2	"Beyond Repair"	Michael Hurst	Story by : Becca Barnes, Alwyn Dale, Maiya Thompson & Cameron Dixon; Teleplay by : Maiya Thompson, Alwyn Dale & Becca Barnes	September 29, 2023
Billy works on a new prosthetic arm for Javi while Solon, Amelia, and Lani unsuccessfully try to cure Ollie and Izzy and Warden Garcia discuss Zedd's invasion. Meanwhile, Doodrip steals Squillia's ship, intending to destroy the Rangers before Zedd. As a result, the Rangers are sent to fight him, eventually destroying him with the Cosmic Fury Zords. Back at Dinohenge, Javi's prosthetic arm nearly causes an accident, and Amelia and Lani propose using an energy conductor to reverse Ollie's corruption. However, amidst the preparations, Zedd attacks Dinohenge, destroying the statues and depowering the Rangers except for Ollie's, who affirms his loyalty to Zedd. Cornered, the Rangers and their allies retreat, teleporting their base and themselves out of Earth to another planet, Erridus. Following this defeat, the team is discouraged, but with Amelia's help, they regain their morale, before discovering that Fern, who was searching for Izzy, is still in their base, having been teleported in during the fight.
3	"Off Grid"	Michael Hurst	Story by : Alwyn Dale & Becca Barnes; Teleplay by : Steve McCleary & Alwyn Dale	September 29, 2023
As the Rangers and their allies struggle on their next actions following their base's relocation, Billy theorizes about the ability to make new Ranger powers after placing a Dino Key near Master Red's staff. Just then, Aiyon is attacked by a Scuttleworm while trying to find food to eat, forcing everyone to drive it away. Using a recently erected antenna tower, Solon hears of Zedd's invasion of Earth and notes that the other Rangers' Zords cannot be summoned due to a forcefield surrounding the planet. As everyone settles down, Aiyon admits his grief over losing Zayto, but Amelia helps him calm down. Just then, the Scuttleworm attacks again, but Aiyon lures it away. Billy returns with a new set of Morphers and Cosmic Orbs for the team to use, allowing the Rangers to morph into new forms for their fight against Zedd, where Amelia becomes the new Red Ranger and leader of the newly dubbed Cosmic Fury Rangers. Meanwhile, Mick learns of Zayto's location, revealing it in a message to Lani, who is tricked into revealing this information to Ollie and Zedd, and Solon, who mobilizes the team to find Zayto before Zedd does.
4	"Team Work"	Charlie Haskell	Story by : Maiya Thompson, Cameron Dixon, Becca Barnes & Alwyn Dale; Teleplay by : Cameron Dixon & Becca Barnes	September 29, 2023
The Rangers arrive on planet Levvina, and after rescuing Mick from capture, they soon find evidence of Zayto's crash-landing: his destroyed Chromafury Saber and fragments of his cape. They trek through the forest, unaware that Ollie, trying to prove to Lord Zedd that teamwork is the key to victory, is shadowing them with a team of monsters, which they manage to defeat. Discovering the plant life has enough intelligence to retaliate for perceived threats (slapping Aiyon when he pushes the leaves roughly), Ollie tricks them into being captured by vines. However, they soon realize that the forest of the planet is actually a collective sentient consciousness, and using their telepathy, Aiyon and Amelia convince the forest of their true allegiances, and Ollie is quickly forced to retreat. As the others protect the planet from Squidrills, Aiyon then heads to the tree where he pulls Zayto from its protective care. They both thank the forest, though Aiyon is left visibly shaken when he can't read Zayto's thoughts anymore, and the forest cryptically tells Zayto to 'enjoy the time he has left'. Back on the ship, Zayto morphs into the Zenith Ranger using Master Red's staff as his weapon and discovers Solon, Billy, and Fern have turned the base into a spaceship. Meanwhile, Zedd has dominated and conquered the planet Eltar, homeworld of his late nemesis Zordon, and at his mountaintop lair, tells Ollie, who has seen the error in thinking teamwork was essential, that the only thing that matters in existence is survival at all costs.
5	"Rock Out"	Charlie Haskell	Story by : Alwyn Dale, Becca Barnes, Maiya Thompson & Cameron Dixon; Teleplay by : Maiya Thompson & Becca Barnes	September 29, 2023
The team sees that Earth and other planets are defenseless against Zedd. Finding that Bajillia has a streaming channel live, the Rangers learn Zedd has found a zord which Billy recognizes from the altar on Zordnia as the missing Cosmic Dragon Zord, which presumably got separated eons ago and crashed on Planet Akraal. Disguised as a metal rock band, Javi, Izzy, Fern, Amelia, and Aiyon arrive at the mine and start a concert to distract the workers. Ollie quickly realizes the distraction and orders the band to be attacked (not realizing that the fifth member is Fern and not Zayto). Fern soon blows her cover, and Ollie returns in time to watch Zayto activate the Cosmic Dragon Zord and escape with it, but not before Ollie throws a tracker on it. The team defeats a Squidrill and heads back to base. The rangers get a message from Tarrick on Earth and learn that Zedd has taken many humans as hostage, including Javi and Izzy's parents, and a spy working for Tarrick has passed intel that the Squidrills work together to maintain the forcefield around Earth. As such, the Rangers prepare the Cosmic Cruiser for launch. Whilst Ollie reveals his tracker scheme, Zedd is annoyed by Squillia talking incessantly about her new crush, shown in selfies to be Heckyl, the former enemy-turned ally of the Dino Charge Rangers.
6	"Take Off"	Charlie Haskell	Story by : Becca Barnes, Alwyn Dale, Maiya Thompson & Cameron Dixon; Teleplay by : Maiya Thompson & Alwyn Dale	September 29, 2023
During engine tests on attempting a launch, Zayto, Javi, and Aiyon encounter a giant Scuttleworm whilst Billy manages to get the cloaking field back online to protect the ship. Tests show there is a problem with the new thrusters, so Billy and Solon go because Izzy stops Fern from helping. They are able to get the thrusters working, but Solon is ambushed and taken by Scuttleworms while her comm is left behind. Amelia refuses to leave without her, not realizing that the tracker Ollie planted has led him right to Erridus. Zayto uses magic to locate Solon but is quickly exhausted from it. A Copyguard then launches an orbital bombardment to force the rangers out of hiding, so while the others fight it with the Cosmic Fury Megazord, a weakened Zayto and Izzy go looking for Solon, leaving Fern behind after Izzy convinces Amelia to leave her safely on board. Ambushed by Ollie and the hunter Jozotic, Zayto and Izzy fight them whilst Fern, seeing everyone is in trouble, takes the last Cosmic Morpher as a weapon and teleports to Solon just as Scuttleworms attack her. Unable to teleport out again due to the morpher being damaged, Fern prepares to fight until the morpher bonds her to DNA from Solon (a Solonosaurus), turning her into the Cosmic Fury Orange Ranger, and they teleport out, leaving Ollie and Jozotic to fight a horde of Scuttleworms. Meanwhile, Squillia delegates her duties of protecting Earth's forcefield so she can spend more time with Heckyl. Izzy apologizes for her overprotectiveness and the girls make up. Zedd reveals to Ollie that his plan to dominate the universe involves the energy of the Morphin Masters, still trapped in the Captivator.
7	"Operation Seasoning"	Charlie Haskell	Story by : Alwyn Dale, Becca Barnes, Maiya Thompson & Cameron Dixon; Teleplay by : Alwyn Dale, Steve McCleary & Cameron Dixon	September 29, 2023
Zayto awakens from a long sleep to find the Cosmic Cruiser orbiting Earth, and the team has a plan: using a time-coordinated attack where Tarrick's spy disrupts the forcefield long enough for the two Megazords to enter the atmosphere and start destroying Squidrills worldwide so they can release the imprisoned Ranger teams and fight back. Heckyl gifts Squillia a spa treatment for the day and offers to stay and cover her whilst she's away, but Omwhyzo prevents her from leaving. Heckyl then blows his cover and morphs into the Dino Charge Dark Ranger to lower the forcefield, but fails and is captured. Unaware the plan failed, the Cosmic Fury and Dragon Megazords are pulled in by Earth's gravity and neutralized. All the Rangers bar Aiyon and Zayto are captured. Zayto sends the Zords back into the Morphin Grid for protection and recovery, but faints again as the two are rescued by the Resistance. When Solon and Aiyon question him over his fainting, Zayto reveals that he was resurrected by the Morphin Masters using a portion of their magic, which is what sustains him. But the magic he uses depletes fast, and he reluctantly admits that when the last amount of it is gone, he will die again. Not wanting to worry the others, he tells Aiyon and Solon to keep it a secret. With a new plan to use Grid Battleforce's Transporters, Zayto uses magic to turn Solon giant as a distraction so Aiyon can teleport Squillia's Mega Squidrill, sending it crashing into the prison, allowing the captured humans and Rangers, including Heckyl, to escape. Solon takes a fainted Zayto back to base to rest while the other Rangers summon their Zords and take out the remaining Squidrills. Tarrick kills Omwhyzo, while Billy and Heckyl capture Squillia.
8	"Switching Sides"	Michael Hurst	Story by : Becca Barnes, Alwyn Dale, Maiya Thompson & Cameron Dixon; Teleplay by : Becca Barnes & Cameron Dixon	September 29, 2023
Unable to gain any information from Squillia's mind about Zedd's plans (as instead of paying attention, she was thinking of designer sunglasses), the team turn their attention to a new plan to cure Ollie from Lani, who believes that destroying the Tricera Statue will break his corrupted link to the Morphin Grid and turn him good again. Aiyon returns to his cafe to close up, and stumbles upon Slyther and Mucus in human form (through magic and a permanent wish charm respectively). He learns that they quit evil to become circus performers until Zedd's invasion interrupted them. Realizing they are now good, Aiyon takes them to the Resistance Base with a plan where they pretend to still be evil, infiltrate Zedd's base, and destroy the statue. Mucus being stuck in human form causes problems when she and Slyther don't want to be separated, so Zayto uses his magic to break the wish charm and turn her into her old form. Zayto faints again just as Bajillia arrives with her Copyguards to rescue her daughter, having tracked her through her phone. The mother and daughter team put up a good fight, but Amelia, Izzy, and Fern combine attacks to kill them both. Slyther disguises himself as Squillia for the plan and the Rangers leave to tend to Zayto, unaware that Bajillia's tentacle survived and slipped away. The Rangers realize Aiyon and Solon are hiding something, so Zayto awakens and, apologizing for his deception and the position he put his friends in, reveals the truth to them all: when his little remaining magic is gone, he will return to the Morphin Grid forever. Slyther and Mucus manage to destroy the Tricera Statue, destroying Ollie's Ranger Powers forever but, Ollie, declaring himself to still be loyal to Zedd, captures them.
9	"Master Plan"	Michael Hurst	Story by : Alwyn Dale & Becca Barnes; Teleplay by : Becca Barnes, Alwyn Dale & Guy Langford	September 29, 2023
With little magic and life remaining, Zayto promises to not use magic unless it's solely to protect the team. Zedd calls the Rangers to reveal that Bajillia is still alive, and that despite losing the statue, Ollie is still evil. While Zedd is distracted torturing Slyther and Mucus, Ollie attacks him, indicating his corrupted link was severed, and he pretended to still be evil. Before the feed is cut, he reveals Zedd's ultimate plan to turn himself into a Morphin Master. Amelia plans to launch an immediate rescue mission, however Billy tells her that he and the other Ranger teams are busy liberating the rest of the universe and if she goes now, she'll be leading her team into a trap with no backup. However, she insists on going due to the risk Zedd poses if he connects to the Grid. Arriving on Eltar, they are attacked by Inkworth, and finding themselves outgunned, form the Cosmic Fury Ultrazord to win. The Rangers storm Zedd's fortress and rescue Ollie, Mucus, and Slyther with Ollie and Amelia reconciling. However, Bajillia rigs the entire complex as a trap that prevents them from teleporting out. With seconds before detonation and no way to escape, Zayto sacrifices himself by using the last of his magic to create a forcefield to protect the team. With his power gone, the Morphin Grid opens up and takes him away and Aiyon, refusing to let go, has his spirit taken into the Grid as well, leaving his body unconscious. Ollie hatches a plan to combine all their weapons into a Blaster, and is helped by Solon, who discovers Zayto's T-Rex Cosmic Orb has turned into the Tricera Cosmic Orb, giving Ollie new powers. But they arrive too late as Zedd has absorbed all the energy from the Morphin Masters, and evolved into Master Zedd, easily defeating the Rangers and destroying the Zords. Suddenly, Bajillia and her minions betray Zedd, trapping him inside the Master Captivator. As Solon sends a distress signal, Bajillia reveals her true plan from when she first freed Zedd was to help him gain absolute power, then destroy him and create a shockwave that will destroy all good in the universe.
10	"The End"	Michael Hurst	Alwyn Dale & Becca Barnes	September 29, 2023
Aiyon awakens in a white void with a being that looks like Zayto, who, through cryptic words, tells Aiyon that Zayto's mortal life has ended. The being sends Aiyon back to his friends with a final farewell, May the power protect you. Slyther and Mucus hijack a Squidrill, kill all of Bajillia's minions and cause a distraction to allow the Rangers to escape with the Captivator, which gets damaged in the process. Having heard Solon's distress signal, Billy and other Ranger teams arrive in their Megazords to engage the Squidrill armada. Aiyon awakens, and unable to stop the Captivator's destruction, the team decides to send it into the Morphin Grid to detonate it safely, though the blast might sever every Ranger's power. Returning to the altar on Zordnia to use Zayto's staff, they are confronted by Bajillia, who had stowed away on their ship. The Rangers use the Cosmic Blaster to kill Bajillia for good, but an errant shot from her dropped weapon hits the tube. Suddenly, Zayto emerges from a portal, dressed like a Morphin Master, and takes himself and the team into the tube to talk to Zedd. He explains that Zedd will not survive the blast either, and promises to free him if he relinquishes his power; Zedd reluctantly agrees. Zedd is later shown to have defeated the Rangers anyway until his wife Rita Repulsa calls for him. It is revealed that Zayto has trapped Zedd on the Planet Nibyro to be imprisoned in his worst nightmare (being alone with his wife). This planet will also trap anyone trying to rescue Zedd too, though Zayto suggests that Zedd may some day redeem himself and become good. The freed Morphin Masters are grateful but uncertain how Zayto is now one of them, though Aiyon believes that the being he spoke to was responsible, which confuses matters more as no being capable of this exists. With Zayto now a Morphin Master, Zayto and his friends have a heartbreaking goodbye, though he promises he will always be watching over them as he and the other Masters return to the Grid. Sometime later at a concert, Tarrick and Santaura reveal they gave birth to a girl they named Poppy, and Javi sings a song named after the being's farewell to Aiyon, which Billy links to Zordon, musing with Mick that Zordon is still out there.

== Production ==
=== Development ===
Development on a thirtieth season of Power Rangers began as early as May 2021, with the cast and crew of Dino Fury having already signed on to a future third season. In February 2022, casting sides for the season were released. In June 2022, the title of the show Cosmic Fury was leaked to the public, though it was initially believed to have been a placeholder title, subjected to change.

On August 27, 2022, Hasbro revealed that Simon Bennett would be returning from Dino Fury as executive producer for Cosmic Fury, alongside the show's six main returning cast members. According to Bennett, Dino Fury was intended to end at the second season, but due to the positive reception with the series, Hasbro made the executive decision to continue with a third season.

On September 30, 2022, Hasbro Pulse held a Power Rangers panel featuring Bennett and the cast for Power Rangers Cosmic Fury. It was confirmed that Cosmic Fury would be only adapting Zord footage and antagonists from Uchu Sentai Kyuranger, while suits and on-ground fights will be entirely original.

On June 28, 2023, Hasbro announced that Cosmic Fury will be the final season of Power Rangers to be filmed in New Zealand.

=== Filming ===
Filming began in early October, with the main cast members having started shooting their scenes in late-October. Filming wrapped before December 25, 2022.

=== Post-production ===
Bennett confirmed that Cosmic Fury has entered post-production and will not be finished until late July. By early June, ADR work had been completed.

=== Music ===
Bert Selen composed the score and the theme song, which incorporated elements from his previous work in Power Rangers Dino Fury.

In August 2023, the theme song was revealed. It was released as a single by Hasbro on September 29, 2023, along with the series.

A 41-track soundtrack album was released on August 3, 2024.

== Marketing ==
On September 30, 2022, Hasbro Pulse revealed concept art for the Cosmic Fury Ranger suits, particularly the Green and Gold Rangers. In October, concept art for the Cosmic Fury Blue Ranger was revealed. On January 17, 2023, concept art for the remaining Rangers, particularly Black, Zenith, and Red were revealed. On the same day, a video was released featuring the main cast in their suits, with Amelia being marketed as the first mainstay female Red Ranger.

== Reception ==
=== Accolades ===
Year	Award	Category	Recipient	Result	Ref.
2024	GLAAD Media Awards	Outstanding Kids and Family Programming	Power Rangers Cosmic Fury	Nominated	
2024	Kids' Choice Awards	Favorite Kids TV Show	Power Rangers Cosmic Fury	Nominated	
2024	Kids' Choice Awards	Favorite Male TV Star (Kids)	Chance Perez	Nominated	
2024	Kids' Choice Awards	Favorite Female TV Star (Kids)	Hunter Deno	Nominated	
2024	Kids' Choice Awards	Favorite Female TV Star (Kids)	Tessa Rao	Nominated	
