= Bert Selen =

- Born: Bert Jacobus Martinus Selen; 30 August 1985 (age 40); Kessel-Eik, Netherlands
- Occupations: Producer, musician, composer, TV/film composer
- Website: www.bertselen.com

Bert Jacobus Martinus Selen (born 30 August 1985) is a Dutch music producer, composer, multi-instrumentalist and songwriter based in Los Angeles. His scoring work includes Rules of Engagement, (Sony/CBS), Fast Layne (Disney Channel), Raven's Home (Disney Channel), K.C. Undercover (Disney Channel), Lab Rats (Disney XD), Lab Rats: Elite Force (Disney XD), Mystery Girls (ABC Family) and Power Rangers Dino Fury, Power Rangers Cosmic Fury (Nickelodeon & Netflix).

His music has been featured on Parks and Recreation (NBC), NCIS Los Angeles (CBS), The Mentalist (CBS), Gossip Girl (CW), Awkward (MTV), Finding Carter (MTV), Trailers: Danny Collins (Al Pacino), Advertising: American Music Awards (E! Network), Verizon, Vogue, Logitech, Head & Shoulders, as well as in the video game WET (Artificial Mind and Movement/Bethesda Softworks) Stage productions include The Pee-Wee Herman show on Broadway (HBO), and Pee-Wee Herman live at the Nokia Theatre.

== Early life ==
Selen was born in Kessel-Eik, The Netherlands.

== Musical career ==
At age 17, Selen moved to the United States with his band. Selen assumed producer duties on their first record. He then worked with local and international music acts. His songs appeared on various tv shows. At age 23, his work on Rules of Engagement (Sony/CBS) earned him a BMI Film & Television Award for Composing for a Top Grossing Prime Time Television Show, the youngest composer in the room.

In 2009 he provided original music for the Artificial Mind and Movement video game WET.

Selen composed and produced songs for Pee-Wee Herman's comeback shows on Broadway and at the Nokia Theatre in Los Angeles. He produced and recorded a rendition of Mr. Big's "To Be with You" with the Rules of Engagement cast, and started composing the music for Lab Rats. He also scored music for X-Japan's Sankyo promotional videos.

Selen co-wrote, produced and mixed the debut album for Fire in the Hamptons, a Los Angeles-based electro-pop group.

Selen operates his music production company in North Hollywood, CA.

== Equipment ==
Selen is endorsed by Adams Drums, and Line 6.
