= Tessa Rao =

New Zealand actress (born 1998)

- Born: 20 February 1998 (age 28); Auckland, New Zealand
- Occupation: Actress
- Years active: 2017–present

Tessa Rao (born 20 February 1998) is a New Zealand actress. She is known for her roles as Izzy Garcia in the Nickelodeon/Netflix series Power Rangers Dino Fury (2021–2022) and Power Rangers Cosmic Fury (2023) and Poppy Achari in the TVNZ 2 soap opera Shortland Street (2025).

== Early life ==
Rao was born in Auckland. She is a graduate of Trinity College London and the American Academy of Dramatic Arts .

== Career ==
Rao's biggest role of her career so far has been playing Izzy Garcia (The Green Ranger) in Power Rangers Dino Fury. The character is known for being the first lesbian character in the Power Rangers franchise. Rao was worried that she would have to cut her hair for the character. She reprised her role in Power Rangers Cosmic Fury. Rao was then cast in the New Zealand soap opera Shortland Street as Poppy Achari.

== Filmography ==
=== Film ===
Year	Title	Role	Notes
2017	Into the Rainbow	Koia	
2018	Behind the Cover	Ava	Short
2019	Moving Day	Dead Victim	Short
2020	Zozo	Megan	Short
2025	Project MKHEXE	Ashleigh	

=== Television ===
Year	Title	Role	Notes
2017	Auckward Love	Eveline	Episode; Oh my god, we're back again
2021-2022	Power Rangers Dino Fury	Izzy Garcia	41 episodes
2023	Power Rangers Cosmic Fury	Izzy Garcia	10 episodes
2024	A Remarkable Place to Die	Georgia	Episode; Out of the Blue
2025	Shortland Street	Poppy Achari	75 episodes
