= Jared Turner =

Australian actor

- Born: Jared Philip Turner; New Plymouth, Taranaki, New Zealand
- Occupation: Actor
- Years active: 1995–present
- Height: 5 ft 9 in (175 cm)
- Spouse: Lissy Mayer (m. 2014)
- Children: 4

Jared Turner is a New Zealand-born Australian actor, best known for his roles as Ben Maddox in Go Girls, Tarrick/Void Knight in Power Rangers Dino Fury and Cosmic Fury, and as Ty Johnson on the television series, The Almighty Johnsons.

== Early life and education ==
Jared Philip Turner was born in New Plymouth, Taranaki, New Zealand, to parents of Samoan and German descent.

His family moved to Sydney, Australia, in 1980 and he went on to graduate from Theatre Nepean, University of Western Sydney in 2000.

== Career ==
Turner played teacher Ben Maddox in Go Girls (2009–10) and as Ty Johnson on the television series, The Almighty Johnsons (2011–13). He is also recognised on New Zealand TV screens for hosting the Energy Efficiency and Conservation Authority's energy-saving adverts, "The Energy Spot".

== Personal life ==
In 2014, Turner married costume designer Lissy Mayer at a wedding ceremony in Oratia, New Zealand. The couple has a blended family of four children.

== Filmography ==
=== Film ===
| Year | Title | Role | Notes |
|---|---|---|---|
| 2003 | Basilisk Stare | Spike | Short |
| 2004 | In Too Deep | Sales Assistant | Short |
| 2006 | Discount Taxi Driver | Charles | Short |
| 2007 | Coffee and Allah | Café Manager | Short |
| 2007 | 30 Days of Night | Aaron | |
| 2008 | Love in the Time of Chlamydia | Kerry Post | Short |
| 2009 | Underworld: Rise of the Lycans | Xristo | |
| 2009 | The Warning | Tommy Mate | Short |
| 2009 | Lines Crossed | Male | Short |
| 2013 | End of Daze | Jared | |
| 2014 | The Last Saint | Gaz | |
| 2016 | Titiro | William | Short |
| 2017 | 6 Days | Tommy Palmer | |

=== Television ===
| Year | Title | Role | Notes |
|---|---|---|---|
| 1995 | Home and Away | Kid | Episode: "1.1813" |
| 2002 | All Saints | Brett Davis | Episode: "All Choked Up" |
| 2007 | Reckless Behavior: Caught on Tape | Fireman | TV film |
| 2007 | Outrageous Fortune | Trent | Episode: "To Sleep, No More" |
| 2008 | Power Rangers Jungle Fury | Whiger | 5 episodes |
| 2009–10 | Go Girls | Ben Maddox | Recurring role (series 1–2) |
| 2011–2013 | The Almighty Johnsons | Tyrone 'Ty' Johnson | Main role |
| 2013 | Spartacus: War of the Damned | Lucius Furius | Episode: "Enemies of Rome" |
| 2014 | The Brokenwood Mysteries | Rory Parkes | Episode: "Hunting the Stag" |
| 2015 | True Crime: Venus and Mars | Marty Bruce | TV film |
| 2015 | Ash vs Evil Dead | Eligos (voice) | Episodes: "Books from Beyond", "Brujo", "The Host" |
| 2015 | When We Go to War | Sgt. Graves | TV miniseries |
| 2016 | The Shannara Chronicles | Slanter | Recurring role (series 1) |
| 2016 | Filthy Rich | Sam Halloway | Recurring role (series 1) |
| 2016 | Hillary | Earl Riddiford | Episodes: "Louise", "Home", "Race to the Pole" |
| 2016 | Roman Empire | Marcus Aurelius Cleander | Main role (series 1) |
| 2016–17 | The Secret Daughter | Christopher Norton | Main role |
| 2018 | Power Rangers Super Ninja Steel | Joe | Episode: "Car Trouble" |
| 2019 | Ablaze | Roger Ballantyne | TV film |
| 2020 | Almost Paradise | Todd Carpenter | Episode: "Something Walker This Way Comes" |
| 2020–21 | One Lane Bridge | Rob Ryder | Recurring role |
| 2021–22 | Power Rangers Dino Fury | Tarrick/Void Knight/Void King | Main role |
| 2021 | Sweet Tooth | George Anderson | Co-starring; episode: "Sorry About All the Dead People" |
| 2023 | Power Rangers Cosmic Fury | Tarrick | Recurring role |
| 2026 | Monarch: Legacy of Monsters | Templeton | Recurring role (series 2) |

== Theatre ==
| Year | Title | Role | Notes |
|---|---|---|---|
| 1999 | No Worries | Ensemble | Theatre Nepean |
| 1999 | Alice's Adventures Underground | Lewis Carroll | Theatre Nepean |
| 2000 | Richard II | Earl of Salisbury / William Bagot / Sir Pierce of Exton | Theatre Nepean / Footbridge Theatre |
| 2000 | The Playboy of the Western World | Christy Mahon | Theatre Nepean / Footbridge Theatre |
| 2001 | Jake & Pete | Jake | Manitoba Theatre for Young People |
| 2001 | Get the Message | Jared | Co. Theatre Physical |
| 2001 | Blue Heart | Lewis | Griffin Theatre Company |
| 2001 | Search and Destroy | Robert / Pamfilo | New Theatre (Newtown) |
| 2002 | Solitude in Blue | Colin | Griffin Theatre Company |
| 2002 | Six Pack | Mark | Sydney Opera House |
| 2003 | The Castle | Brian | New Theatre (Newtown) |
| 2003 | Pirandello's The Rules of the Game | Dr. Spiga | Darlinghurst Theatre |
| 2004 | Stepping into Shadows | Matt | Darlinghurst Theatre |
| 2007 | Motel Nights | Ensemble | Aotea Centre |
| 2009 | The Arrival | Ensemble | Auckland Civic Theatre |
