= List of Shortland Street characters introduced in 2025 =

The following is a list of characters that first appeared in the New Zealand soap opera Shortland Street in 2025, by order of first appearance. All characters are introduced by the shows executive producer Oliver Driver.

== Poppy Achari ==
Poppy Achari
- Shortland Street character
- Portrayed by: Tessa Rao
- Duration: 2025–2026
- First appearance: 10 February 2025
- Last appearance: 17 November 2026
- Introduced by: Oliver Driver
In-universe information
- Occupation: Registrar
- Mother: Marianne Achari

Poppy Achari, played by Tessa Rao, made her first appearance in 2025 as one of the main point of view characters in the revamp of the show.

Poppy arrived at the hospital with her best friend Cleo Atwell as a new registrar who starts working in the ED under Department Head Emmett Whitman and Dr Gia Te Atakura. She begins a relationship with Hendrix Colson who is seen as very controlling towards her and threatens Cleo and breaks up with him and tells him to leave the next day he tells her he moving hospitals and tells her she loves her and she takes him back. They break up again after he grabbed her wrist, refusing to let go witness by Cleo, Sage and Emmett and tells him to never speak to her again and he leaves. She later begins sleeping with Logan Barns but there moment was ruined when Poppy’s mother Marianne unexpectedly walked in, leaving her embarrassed. In November she was devasted following the death of her friend Cleo. After Cleo's wake she went home with Hendrix and two slept together. In the cliffhanger she learns that Hendrix in fact killed Cleo, threatened her mother, and slept with Phil. As the hospital burns Poppy confronts Hendrix, when he admits to everything she punches him and they both fall down the stairs, she prepares to kill him but was stopped by Chris.

At the start of 2026 it was revealed that Hendrix is facing trial for murder of Cleo. After Marty and Naz had a fight, and concerned about his injuries, Poppy returned Naz to his place and help clean him up. The pair share a kiss and spend the night together, however still shaken about Hendrix she decided she is not ready for a relationship and they break up. Poppy ends up sleeping with her flatmate Ash James after spending the day drinking with him and the other flatmates, Cody and Cindy. When Naz discovers their involvement he lashes out, slut-shaming her. Poppy struggled as her mother Marianne interfered with her relationship with Naz and also slept with Ash, although finds forgiveness for Marianne after she is pushed down the stairs by Cody.

Poppy had expected several chances to act as the Head of ED but at first lost the opportunity to, and struggled to work under, the military style of Dr Sophia Crane, and then later again lost the opportunity to Murray Schu. Disappointed about missing out on role she sleeps with Ash again. After a bizarre dream sequence where Maeve, Sage, and Emmett sing in top hats about sleeping with Ash left her confused about her feelings, she discussed everything with BJ, before eventually opening up to Ash about her past relationship with Hendrix and the dream she had. The pair share a kiss. Hendrix is found not guilty of Cleo’s murder and returned to Shortland Street to once again torment Poppy, however his renewed reign of terror was cut short when he was murdered by Mickey Hudson. Once the truth around Ash’s true identity as Tyler Hudson is revealed, Poppy found herself dragged into the criminal dealings of the Hudson family and a corrupt police officer. At the end of the year Poppy learned she had passed her consultants exams and returned to her apartment to find Cindy being held at gunpoint by Mickey. After Cindy was accidentally shot, Poppy took advantage of Mickey being distracted and set Mickey on fire. Locking themselves in the bedroom, Poppy was able to lower Cindy out the fire escape, however was dragged back into the burning apartment by Mickey before she too could escape. Cindy was devastated to see Poppy’s body brought out in a body bag.

== Cleo Atwell ==
Cleo Atwell
- Shortland Street character
- Portrayed by: Madeleine McCarthy
- Duration: 2025–2026
- First appearance: 10 February 2025
- Last appearance: 29 October 2025
- Introduced by: Oliver Driver
In-universe information
- Occupation: Registrar

Cleo Atwell, played by Madeleine McCarthy, made her first appearance in 2025.

== Hendrix Colson ==
Hendrix Colson
- Shortland Street character
- Portrayed by: Joe Witkowski
- Duration: 2025-2026
- First appearance: 9 April 2025
- Last appearance: 10 August 2026
- Introduced by: Oliver Driver
In-universe information
- Occupation: Registrar

Dr Hendrix Colson, played by Joe Witkowski, made his first appearance in 2025. Hendrix was introduced as an existing friend of Nurse Sage Stewart and part of a coercive control storyline for Dr Poppy Achari.

Hendrix appeared in mid-2025 as a new locum registrar and quickly started a relationship with junior registrar Poppy Achari. Poppy’s best friend Cleo soon sensed that something was off in their relationship with Hendrix increasingly manipulating situations and attempting to control Poppy’s appearance and behaviour. When Poppy tried to end their relationship Hendrix became violent. After several attempts to restart his relationship with Poppy, Hendrix was confronted by Cleo on the hospital rooftop. Hendrix, in turn, threw Cleo off the roof and was able to orchestrate the situation to make it appear Cleo committed suicide and was able to resume a relationship with Poppy once again. As the year went on, Hendrix also began manipulating situations involving Phil and attempted to threaten Poppy’s mother Marianne. Emmett witnesses the behaviour and fired Hendrix. With his plans falling apart, Hendrix was confronted by Poppy as the hospital was evacuated during the 2025 cliffhanger. The ensuing struggle left Hendrix unconscious and Poppy contemplating murdering him in revenge for Cleo.

At the start of 2026 it was revealed Hendrix faced a trial for Cleo’s murder but was found not guilty. Hendrix started stalking and intimidating Poppy once again, and returned to Ferndale in August to have his revenge. Hendrix attempted to attack Poppy only to be stopped and murdered by Mickey Hudson.

== Andi Franklin ==
Andi Franklin
- Shortland Street character
- Portrayed by: Prin Barry
- Duration: 2025
- First appearance: 5 May 2025
- Last appearance: 9 December 2025
- Introduced by: Oliver Driver
In-universe information
- Occupation: Pensioner
- Husband: Ken Franklin

Andi Franklin, played by Prin Barry, made her first appearance in 2025.

== Ken Franklin ==
Ken Franklin
- Shortland Street character
- Portrayed by: Terry Barry
- Duration: 2025
- First appearance: 7 May 2025
- Last appearance: 3 September 2025
- Introduced by: Oliver Driver
In-universe information
- Occupation: Pensioner

Ken Franklin, played by Terry Barry, made her first appearance in 2025.

== John Whitman ==
John Whitman
- Shortland Street character
- Portrayed by: Bruce Phillips
- Duration: 2025
- Introduced by: Oliver Driver
In-universe information
- Sons: Emmett Whitman
- Granddaughters: Bonnie Kawiti
- Other relatives: Karamea Kawiti

John Whitman, played by Bruce Phillips, made his first appearance in 2025.

== Marianne Achari ==
Marianne Achari
- Shortland Street character
- Portrayed by: Senica Calder
- Duration: 2025–2026
- First appearance: 6 October 2025
- Last appearance: 22 April 2026
- Introduced by: Oliver Driver
In-universe information
- Occupation: Consultant
- Daughters: Poppy Achari

Marianne Achari, played by Senica Calder, made her first appearance in 2025.
