= Super Pig =

Japanese anime television series

- 愛と勇気のピッグガール とんでぶーりん
- Created by: Taeko Ikeda
- Based on: Nantonaku Boorin by Shinri Mori
- Directed by: Takayoshi Suzuki
- Music by: Goro Omi
- Country of origin: Japan
- Original language: Japanese
- No. of episodes: 51

Production
- Executive producer: Kōichi Motohashi
- Producers: Toshihide Kanno (MBS); Akira Iguchi (MBS); Yasuo Kameyama; Masahiko Kobayashi
- Production companies: Nippon Animation; Mainichi Broadcasting System

Original release
- Network: JNN (MBS, TBS)
- Release: September 3, 1994 – August 26, 1995

Related
- Manga

Tonde Burin
- Written by: Taeko Ikeda
- Published by: Shogakukan
- Imprint: Flower Comics
- Magazine: Ciao
- Original run: October 1994 – September 1995
- Volumes: 3

Super Pig (Japanese: 愛と勇気のピッグガール とんでぶーりん, Hepburn: Ai to Yuuki no Pig Girl Tonde Būrin) is a Japanese magical girl anime television series created by Taeko Ikeda, loosely based on the manga Nantonaku Boorin by Shinri Mori and produced by Nippon Animation that aired on MBS, TBS and its affiliates from September 3, 1994 to August 26, 1995 for 51 episodes. A manga adaptation simply titled Tonde Burin (Japanese: とんでぶーりん, Hepburn: Tonde Būrin) was written and illustrated by Ikeda and was originally serialized in Shogakukan's shōjo magazine Ciao from October 1994 to September 1995, collecting into 3 tankōbon volumes.

An English language-version was produced by Saban Entertainment in 1997. This dub aired in New Zealand on TV2. From 1998 to 1999 the Saban dub aired in the Netherlands on Fox Kids with Dutch subtitles. Another English dub aired only in the Philippines under the title Super Boink; this dub kept all the original music.

Both the anime and the manga were planned simultaneously as a media mix project.

== Plot ==
Karin Kokubu (Kassie Carlen) is late for school one day when she comes across an apparently injured yellow pig. It turns out the pig wasn't injured, just hungry, and he gets back his health when he eats Karin's apple. When Karin gets to her school, called Sei Ringo Gakuen (St. Ringo School), she discovers that the pig has stowed away in her backpack, which gets her into trouble with her teacher Makoto Arashiyama (Fowley Fatback).

Later, she meets the pig again and finds out he can talk and fly. The pig gives her a "Dream Tonpact" which she opens, and a pig snout appears from it and attaches itself to her nose. She finds the pig again who explains that he is actually Prince Tonrariano the 3rd (Iggy Pig) of the apple-shaped planet Buringo (Oinko). He tells her how she can transform: by saying "Ba Bi Bu Be Burin!" she transforms into a superpowered pink piglet called Tonde Burin (Super Pig). This is not something Karin is happy about at all, as she'd rather transform into a magical girl heroine like her idol, the tokusatsu character "Cutey Chao" (who is possibly a reference to Cutie Honey). Tonrariāno (who she calls Ton-chan) tells her if she can collect 108 pearls by doing good deeds as Burin, she can do so. The pearl collection operates on karma, meaning if Burin abuses her powers, she will lose pearls.

Whenever someone is in danger, Karin becomes Tonde Burin to thwart the crisis and uses her new abilities to help other people in need.

== Characters ==
=== Main characters ===
Karin Kokubu (国分果林, Kokubu Karin) / Kassie Carlen (Saban) / Colleen Adams (Philippines dub)
Voiced by: Yuri Shiratori (Japanese); Julie Maddalena (English); Dada Carlos (Philippines dub)
The main protagonist of the series. Karin Kokubu is an ordinary 13-year-old schoolgirl in 7th grade who comes across Tonrariano the 3rd one day while on her way to school and gives him an apple. When she gets to school, Karin discovers that the pig has stowed away in her bag, which causes her more trouble. Later, she meets the pig again and finds out he can talk and fly. Karin finds a compact which she opens and a pig snout appears from it and attaches itself to her nose! Karin learns that Tonrariano comes from the Buringo World and that she can transform into Tonde Burin, the Pig Girl of Love and Courage. Tonrariano tells her if she can collect 108 pearls by doing good deeds as Burin she can take on another hero form. There is another drawback to the Tonde Burin alias...If anyone finds out her identity, she will be stuck in the form of a pig for the rest of her life. Karin has a crush on Koichi Mizuno, who happens to like Burin. She has a hobby in painting. When in her Burin alias, she worries about her secret being found out by her father, her little brother, and Jimmy Matsumoto.

Tonrariano the 3rd (トンラリアーノ３世, Tonrariāno San-sei) / Iggy Pig (Saban) / Binky Arnold the 3rd (Philippines dub)
Voiced by: Yuriko Fuchizaki (Japanese); Derek Stephen Prince (English); Rowena Raganit (Philippines dub)
Tonrariano the 3rd is a yellow pig who is a prince from Buuringo and the son of Tonrariano the 2nd. Tonrariano the 3rd came to Earth to undergo a trial to become king. He was found by Karin, who he chose to become Burin, and later starts to live in Karin's room. He is carefree and well-read, yet regrets that Karin hates her Burin plight. Like Burin, Tonrariano can fly and acts as an advisor to Burin. On some occasions, Tonrariano can dress up as Tonde Burin in events in which Karin and Tonde Burin are to be in the same area.

=== Supporting characters ===
Masami Yamakawa (山川真実, Yamakawa Masami) / Prudence Plumm (Saban) / Jean Smith (Philippines dub)
Voiced by: Chie Satō (Japanese); Caryn Rosenthal (English); Charmaine Cordoviz (Philippines dub, episodes 5+)
Masami Yamakawa is Karin's best friend who is on the tennis team. She often encourages her in love matters and other things where she often helps her out. Masami has a crush on Hiromi Kashiwagi.

Kaoru Hidaka (日高薫, Hidaka Kaoru) / Penny Round (Saban) / Suzie (Philippines dub)
Voiced by: Junko Asami (Japanese); Wendee Lee (English); Rowena Raganit (Philippines dub)
Kaoru Hidaka is the class cutie in Karin's class. Unlike Karin, Kaoru has a shy personality and is also full of all kinds of fears. She is an expert at cooking and often prepares refreshments for the soccer team.

Koichi Mizuno (水野光一, Mizuno Kōichi) / Lance Romero
Voiced by: Akira Ishida (Japanese); Richard Cansino (English)
Koichi Mizuno is a first-year student and the captain of the school soccer team. Even though he has to put up with every female student having a crush on him (which also includes Karin and Kaoru), Koichi actually has a crush on Tonde Burin (who he's a fan of) unaware that she is actually Karin.

Takuma Mushanokoji (武者小路琢磨, Mushanokōji Takuma) / Radford Tammack
Voiced by: Tsutomu Kashiwakura (Japanese); Tom Romero (English)
Takuma Mushanokoji is a student in Karin's class and an expert tennis player who has a crush on her and is admired by Keiko Kuroha.

Hiromi Kashiwagi (柏木広海, Kashiwagi Hiromi) / Harley Hoover
Voiced by: Yoshiharu Yamada (Japanese); Anna Garduno (English)
Hiromi Kashiwagi is a student in Karin's class and a close friend of Koichi. He is known for his adventurous spirit and occasional mean comments.

Jimmy Matsumoto (ジミー松本, Jimī Matsumoto) / Milton Massen
Voiced by: Wataru Takagi (Japanese); Kirk Thornton (English)
Jimmy Matsumoto is a nerd in Karin's class who has developed a crush on Kaoru Hidaka. He is good at astronomy, movie making, and science. He begins investigating the appearance of Tonde Burin, which makes Karin nervous.

Keiko Kuroha (黒羽競子, Kuroha Keiko) / Heather Hogwarsh (Saban) / Macy Kramer (Philippines dub)
Voiced by: Rica Matsumoto (Japanese); Laura Summer (English); Charmaine Cordoviz (Philippines dub, episodes 5+)
Keiko Kuroha is the class representative who is Karin Kokubu's rival. She is the sole daughter of a wealthy businessman that owns a huge enterprise called the Kuroha Group. She has a crush on Takuma Mushanokoji and always thinks that Karin is trying to steal him from her. Keiko is not welcomed by the other girls in her class because she's arrogant, gossipy, boastful about her wealth, and nosy about other students' affairs. Since her parents are always away, Keiko's only companions are a pet alligator and a pet octopus. She knows how to control the air as seen in one episode where she operated a hot air balloon as well as operated an airship in the last episode.

Shinichiro Kokubu (国分信一郎, Kokubu Shinichirō) / Ken Carlen (Saban) / Vince Adams (Philippines dub)
Voiced by: Kenichi Ono (Japanese); Michael Sorich (English); Chamaine Cordoviz (Philippines dub, episodes 5+)
Shinichiro Kokubu is the 38-year-old father of Karin. He works as the editor-in-chief at a local newspaper called the Akebono Times and is often seen toting a camera around. Ever since Tonde Burin showed up, Shinichiro has been on the trail to get a scoop on her.

Rikako Kokubu (国分リカコ, Kokubu Rikako)
Voiced by: Yūko Mizutani (in most episodes), Yumi Hikita (ep. 1, 2)
Rikako Kokuba is the 34-year-old fashion designer who is Karin's mother.

Shuhei Kokubu (国分周平, Kokubu Shūhei)
Voiced by: Satomi Kōrogi
Shuhei Kokuba is the 9-year-old brother of Karin Kokubu who is a fan of Tonde Burin.

Makoto Arashiyama (嵐山誠, Arashiyama Makoto) / Fowley Fatback
Voiced by: Tarō Arakawa (Japanese); Bob Papenbrook (English)
Makoto Arashiyama is the social studies teacher at St. Ringo School who is also the coach of the soccer team and the staff sponsor. Makoto also has a secret crush on Nanako Tateishi. He is pressured by his relatives to marry. When the pressure becomes excessive, Makoto doesn't return home for the new year.

Nanako Tateishi (立石菜々子, Tateishi Nanako) / Teacher Jodie (Philippines dub)
Voiced by: Maria Kawamura (Japanese); Weng Raganit (Philippines dub)
Nanako Tateishi is the school nurse at St. Ringo School. Nanako is much welcomed by the students and is admired by the other male teachers, where each one tries to get her to go one a date with them. Nanako bears a resemblance to Cutey Chao and either volunteers or is forced several times to dress like her. She is also a fan of female professional wrestling.

Kondo Masayoshi (近藤正義, Masayoshi Kondō)
Voiced by: Keiichi Sonobe
Kondo Masayoshi is the tennis coach at St. Ringo School who is a fan of "Cutey Chao". He is always competing against Makoto Arashiyama for the attention of Nanako Tateishi.

Tonrariano the 2nd (トンラリアーノ２世, Tonrariāno Ni-sei) / Theodorix Pig
Voiced by: Takao Ōyama (Japanese); R. Martin Klein (English)
Tonrariano the 2nd is the King of Buringo World and the father of Tonrariano the 3rd. Tonrariano the 2nd sent Tonrariano the 3rd to Earth to undergo a trial that would enable his son to become the next king. He is not seen in the series but often contacts his son through the Dream Tonpact. Tonrariano the 2nd plays a key role in Burin's scoring, as he decides how many pearls she gets for every heroic action that she does.

=== Other characters ===
Kobuta (Kobūta)
The Kobuta are a red pig, a green pig, and a blue pig who appear on the show to emphasize a joke.

Butan (ブータン, Būtan)
Voiced by: Maruo Tomoko
Butan is a professional wrestler dressed up as Tonde Burin, who she admires. She makes a good substitute when someone makes a movie of Tonde Burin.

Goro Tatsumaki (Tatsumaki Goro)
Voiced by: Tomohiro Nishimura
Goro Tatsumaki is the leader of a soccer team at Warasuno Junior High School and the older brother of Hitomi Tatsumaki. He is always seen with two unnamed friends of his and prefers to use tricks so that his soccer team can win.

Hitomi Tatsumaki (Tatsumaki Hitomi)
Voiced by: Sakura Tange
Hitomi Tatsumaki is the younger sister of Goro Tatsumaki. She is in the same class as Shuhei Kokuba.

Kinoshita
Kinoshita is the butler and chauffeur of the Kuroha Family who is Keiko's only human companion.

== Media ==
=== Anime ===
==== English dubs ====
An English language-version titled Super Pig was produced by Saban Entertainment in 1997. This dub aired in New Zealand on TV2. From 1998 to 1999 the Saban dub aired in the Netherlands on Fox Kids with Dutch subtitles, and from 2003 to 2004 a Dutch dub based on the Saban dub aired also on Fox Kids. In Poland a Polish dub based on the Saban dub aired on Fox Kids and TVN. In Italy an Italian dub based on the Saban dub aired on Fox Kids between 2001 and 2002. In South America, Germany, Brazil, Russia, Spain, Portugal, and Israel, translated versions of the Saban dub also aired.

Another English dub aired only in the Philippines under the title Super Boink.

==== Episodes ====
No.	Title	Original release date
1	"The Super Girl Burin is Born" "Chō shōjo Būrin Tanjō" (超少女ぶーりん誕生)	September 3, 1994
2	"Shoot of Love and Youth" "Ai to Seishun no Shūto" (愛と青春のシュート)	September 10, 1994
3	"Smash of Love and Friendship" "Namida to Yūjō no Sumasshu" (涙と友情のスマッシュ)	September 17, 1994
4	"The Youth Bet in the Ring" "Ringu ni Kaketa Seishun" (リングに賭けた青春)	September 24, 1994
5	"Entering a Friendship Tug-of-war" "Tsunahiki ga Musunda Yūjō" (綱引きが結んだ友情)	October 1, 1994
6	"Discovery! A Clay Doll of Burin" "Hakken! Būrin no Dogū" (発見！ぶーりんの土偶)	October 8, 1994
7	"The Scarred Heroine" "Kizudarake no Hiroin" (傷だらけのヒロイン)	October 15, 1994
8	"The Great Diet Battle!" "Daietto Dai Sakusen!" (ダイエット大作戦！)	October 22, 1994
9	"Warriors of the Circuit" "Sākitto no Senshi-tachi" (サーキットの戦士たち)	October 29, 1994
10	"The Fire of a Journalist's Soul" "Honō no Jānarisuto Tamashī" (炎のジャーナリスト魂)	November 5, 1994
11	"Aim to be the Best Couple!" "Besuto Kappuru wo Nerae!" (ベストカップルを狙え！)	November 12, 1994
12	"The Super Boy Kashiwagi is Born!" "Chō Shōnen Kashiwagi Tanjō!" (超少年カシワギ誕生！)	November 19, 1994
13	"Mission Sworn to the Galaxy" "Ginga ni Chikau Misshon" (銀河に誓うミッション)	November 26, 1994
14	"Cheers and Applause of the Theatre" "Hakushu to Kassai no Teatoru" (拍手と喝采のテアトル)	December 3, 1994
15	"Grief of the Young Girl's Monpe" "Wakaki Monpe Shōjo no Nageki" (若きもんぺ少女の嘆き)	December 10, 1994
16	"Least Favorite Christmas!?" "Honmei no Inai Kurisumasu!?" (本命のいないＸマス！？)	December 17, 1994
17	"The Girl who Shook Fate" "Unmei ni Yureru Shōjo" (運命にゆれる少女)	December 24, 1994
18	"Homsick Story of the New Year" "Shinshun Hōmushikku Sutōrī" (新春ホームシック物語)	January 7, 1995
19	"Love Dancing in a Silvery White Storm" "Shirogane ni Mau Koi no Arashi" (白銀に舞う恋の嵐)	January 14, 1995
20	"A Giant Keiko Plant Appeared!" "Kyodai Shokubutsu Keiko Shutsugen!" (巨大植物ケイコ出現！)	January 21, 1995
21	"Carousel of Love and Anguish" "Ai to Kunō no Kaitenmokuba" (愛と苦悩の回転木馬)	January 28, 1995
22	"Ton-chan's Fated Love" "Ton-chan no Koi no Yukue" (トンちゃんの恋の行方)	February 4, 1995
23	"Valentine of Law and Courage" "Giri to Yūki no Barentain" (義理と勇気の２・１４)	February 11, 1995
24	"Love Beyond God's Control" "Ai wa Omiwatari wo Koete" (愛は御神渡りを越えて)	February 18, 1995
25	"Karin Takes Over the Hinamatsuri" "Karin ga Uketsugu Hinamatsuri" (果林が受け継ぐひな祭り)	February 25, 1995
26	"Only One Rival!" "Raibaru wa Tada Hitori!" (好敵手はただ一人！)	March 4, 1995
27	"Shock! Burin is Annihilated!?" "Shōgeki! Būrin Shōmetsu!?" (衝撃！ぶーりん消滅！？)	March 11, 1995
28	"A Little Rhapsody of Love" "Chīsana koi no Rapusodī" (小さな恋の狂詩曲)	March 18, 1995
29	"Taken Course to the Island of Eternal Summer" "Tokonatsu no Shima e Shinro wo Tore" (常夏の島へ進路をとれ)	March 25, 1995
30	"A Friend Disappeared in the Jungle" "Mitsurin ni Kieta Tomo" (密林に消えた友)	April 1, 1995
31	"A Storm Called over the Student Council Election" "Arashi wo Yobu Seito-kai Senkyo" (嵐を呼ぶ生徒会選挙)	April 8, 1995
32	"The Innocent Boy's Late-blooming Cherry Blossoms of Love" "Junjō Shōnen Osozaki no Koi Sakura" (純情少年遅咲きの恋桜)	April 15, 1995
33	"Trapped Pollen Drifting in Broad Daylight" "Hakujitsu ni Tadayou Kafun no Wana" (白日に漂う花粉のワナ)	April 22, 1995
34	"Swimming Koinobori of Friendship" "Oyoge Yūjō no Koinobori" (泳げ友情のこいのぼり)	April 29, 1995
35	"The Secret of Takuma's Birth" "Takuma Shussei no Himitsu" (琢磨・出生の秘密)	May 6, 1995
36	"Legend of the Goddess Dancing in the Countryside" "Denen ni Mau Megami no Densetsu" (田園に舞う女神の伝説)	May 13, 1995
37	"A Love Letter is a One-way Ticket to First Love" "Koibumi wa Hatsu Koi no Katamichikippu" (恋文は初恋の片道切符)	May 20, 1995
38	"The Man who Opened the Forbidden Door" "Kindan no Tobira wo Hiraku Otoko" (禁断の扉を開く男)	May 27, 1995
39	"Mystery of the Hidden Family Crest" "Himerareta Kamon no Nazo" (秘められた家紋の謎)	June 3, 1995
40	"The Woman who Failed to be the Heroine" "Hiroin ni Nari Sokoneta Onna" (主役になりそこねた女)	June 10, 1995
41	"Tenacious Man Jimmy Matsumoto" "Shūnen no Otoko Jimī Matsumoto" (執念の男ジミー松本)	June 17, 1995
42	"Burin vs Burin" "Būrin tai Būrin" (ぶーりんｖｓぶーりん)	June 24, 1995
43	"Ghost Stories - A Midsummer Night's Mistake" "Kaidan - Manatsu no Yoru no Ayamachi" (怪談・真夏の夜の過ち)	July 1, 1995
44	"The Lost Tonpact" "Ushinawareta Tonpakuto" (失われたトンパクト)	July 8, 1995
45	"Proud Moment of Promise" "Yakusoku no Haresugata" (約束の晴れ姿)	July 15, 1995
46	"Footsteps of a Creepy Farewell" "Shinobiyoru Wakare no Ashioto" (忍び寄る別れの足音)	July 22, 1995
47	"The House of a Noble Woman" "Kedakaki Onna no Yakata" (気高き女の館)	July 29, 1995
48	"When the Evil Flower Garden Laughs" "Aku no Hanazono ga Warau Toki" (悪の花園が笑うとき)	August 5, 1995
49	"Crisis! The Academy is Targeted" "Kiki! Nerawareta Gakuen" (危機！狙われた学園)	August 12, 1995
50	"Metamorphosis of Tears" "Namida no Metamorufōze" (涙のメタモルフォーゼ)	August 19, 1995
51	"The Super Girl's Future" "Chō Shōjo no Mirai" (超少女の未来)	August 26, 1995

=== Manga ===
A "pilot" story titled Bibbidi Bobbidi Būrin!! (ビビデ·バビデ·ぶ〜りん!!, Bibide Bobide Būrin!!) by Taeko Ikeda. appeared in the fall 1993 issue of Ciao DX. The manga series subsequently appeared in Ciao from the October 1994 issue through the September 1995 issue. The tankōbon, or collections, were released in three volumes by Shogakukan's Flower Comics label.

- Volume 1, ISBN 4-09-136451-9 (released April 1995)
- Volume 2, ISBN 4-09-136452-7 (released August 1995)
- Volume 3, ISBN 4-09-136453-5 (released October 1995)
