= Dorami-chan: Mini-Dora SOS!!! =

1989 film by Makoto Moriwaki

- Theatrical release poster
- Kanji: ドラミちゃん ミニドラSOS!!!
- Revised Hepburn: Dorami-chan Minidora SOS!!!
- Directed by: Makoto Moriwaki
- Screenplay by: Ryo Motohira
- Based on: Doraemon by Fujiko Fujio F
- Produced by: Sōichi Besshi; Hitoshi Mogi; Yoshiaki Koizumi; Junichi Kimura
- Starring: Keiko Yokozawa; Chie Kitagawa; Noriko Ohara; Kaneta Kimotsuki; Kazuya Tatekabe; Michiko Nomura
- Edited by: Hajime Okayasu; Toshihiko Kojima; Yumiko Nakaba; Hideaki Murai; Akihiro Kawasaki
- Music by: Kohei Tanaka
- Production company: Shin-Ei Animation
- Distributed by: Toho
- Release date: March 11, 1989 (Japan)
- Running time: 40 minutes
- Country: Japan
- Language: Japanese
- Box office: $31.4 million

Dorami-chan: Mini-Dora SOS!!! (ドラミちゃん ミニドラSOS!!!, Dorami-chan Minidora SOS!!!) is a 1989 Japanese animated science fiction comedy-drama short film.

It premiered in Japan on March 11, 1989 on a double feature with Doraemon: Nobita and the Birth of Japan and is the first Dorami-chan short film.

The film's tagline is "Dorami-chan's first starring movie role!! A Doramitic adventure unfolding in the world of the 21st century!!" (ドラミチャン映画初主演!! 21世紀の世界でくりひろげるドラミチック・アドベンチャー!!).

== Plot ==
A 22nd-century Gonsuke delivery robot mistakenly drops a dorayaki package for Nobita in 2011, landing it in the room of Nobita's son, Nobisuke. On a rugby field, Nobisuke scores but his team loses, blaming Suneki and Yasashiku for their poor performance. He chases them, while Yasashiku cries and Suneki comforts him.

Nobisuke asks his mother Shizuka for a snack, but she tells him to clean his room instead. While he struggles with his desk drawer, Shizuka tells him to be quiet and he closes his window, noticing a dorayaki package in the trash. Gian arrives with Yasashiku, who is crying. Shizuka calls for Nobisuke, but Gian wants them to care for Yasashiku first. Gian calls Nobisuke, who hasn’t finished cleaning, and Yasashiku heads upstairs. During playtime, Nobisuke offers the dorayaki package to Yasashiku, but he refuses, causing Nobisuke to get frustrated and throw it at him. Shizuka, holding drinks, sees Yasashiku running down from Nobisuke's room in tears, dropping a package. Furious with her son, she prepares to confront Nobisuke until Dorami unexpectedly emerges from a desk drawer, surprising both. Nobisuke mistakes her for his father's childhood friend, Doraemon, but she clarifies she is his sister. Meanwhile, Yasashiku trips outside, opening the package to reveal a Mini-Dora, which then jumps on him.

Back at the Nobi house, Dorami asks Shizuka about the Mini-Dora package, but Shizuka hasn't seen it. Dorami inquires Nobisuke, who is also unaware, leaving her perplexed since the delivery had been confirmed. Mini-Dora clings to Yasashiku's clothes and crawls as he changes direction, which he interprets as Mini-Dora wanting to play. Shizuka asks Dorami about Mini-Dora's delivery, and Dorami explains it was due to childhood Nobita's misguided order. Nobisuke notices a childhood photo of his father with Doraemon and questions Dorami about his father's actions. Shizuka then instructs Nobisuke to complete his homework and clean his room. Dorami informs Shizuka that Nobita's poor handwriting caused the delivery mishap, prompting her to retrieve Mini-Dora to prevent potential issues. Nobisuke realizes the package he threw at Yasashiku may contain Mini-Dora and leaves through his window to retrieve it.

Yasashiku visits the wealthy Suneo Honekawa to show his son, Suneki, the Mini-Dora. Suneki believes Yasashiku wants to play and teases Mini-Dora, angering it. Mini-Dora attacks Suneki until he apologizes. A pod then rises, revealing Suneo, who recognizes Mini-Dora as resembling Doraemon, a robotic character from Nobisuke's past. Before he can elaborate, Suneo departs for Singapore, allowing Yasashiku to stay. Yasashiku and Suneki try to get Mini-Dora to retrieve gadgets for an adventure using an instruction booklet. Before they begin, Mini-Dora runs away, prompting a chase through the 22nd-century city until they stop for dorayaki. After Suneki buys a bag, Yasashiku shows him the Anywhere Door, revealing only a watery view. When Suneki tries to peek through, Yukari splashes him and Yasashiku, entertaining Mini-Dora. They later visit an empty lot where Suneki spots Nobisuke and decides to play a trick by tripping him. Nobisuke sees Suneki's head and approaches, dragging him along. While Yasashiku feeds Mini-Dora another dorayaki, Mini-Dora tries to stop Nobisuke with a small Thunder Cloud, but it fails to have any effect. Nobisuke finds Suneki, Yasashiku, and Mini-Dora hiding in Gian's supermarket, beats up Suneki and Yasashiku, and demands that they return Mini-Dora to Dorami, a robot seeking him. Confused, they refuse, prompting Nobisuke to play with them instead. They attempt various activities, including flying with Takecopters and using the Anywhere Door, while Dorami tracks down Mini-Dora's location via the Time TV.

Later that night, Nobisuke, Suneki, and Yasashiku hide Mini-Dora in Gian's supermarket before dinner. Dorami confronts them, demanding Mini-Dora's return. Yasashiku hands him over, but a cockroach startles Dorami, allowing the boys to escape with Mini-Dora. Inside the supermarket, they feed Mini-Dora a dorayaki, prompting him to use a gadget that transforms the store into a labyrinth. Dorami, lost, uses Bunny Ears to locate the boys and flies to them using the Jet Flower. Nobisuke, Suneki, and Yasashiku, exhausted in the supermarket, feed Mini-Dora a dorayaki for help. He produces a small Solar Yacht, too small for them to use, and later a Small Light. They shrink and enter the yacht, but Dorami destroys the Labyrinth Globe, restoring the supermarket. Unable to find the boys, she informs their parents, who worry as Nobisuke, Mini-Dora, Suneki, and Yasashiku become trapped underwater, their energy fading and pressure rising. The boys cry for help, while Mini-Dora remains confused.

At the Nobi house, Gian, Dorami, Suneo, and Shizuka worry about the boys until Nobita reassures them he placed a transmitter on Nobisuke to locate him. Gian hugs Nobita in relief, and they set out to save the boys. Dorami uses the transmitter to communicate with Nobisuke, Suneki, Yasashiku, and Mini-Dora, informing them they're near an undersea cable in Tokyo Bay. The boys collaborate to pilot the Solar Yacht, with Mini-Dora playfully interacting with Nobisuke and Yasashiku. The boys find a cable, urged by Dorami to follow it despite their fears of underwater pressure damaging the Yacht, which is low on energy. As water leaks into the Yacht, Dorami assures them they’re nearing an underwater meadow where sunlight can energize the Yacht. The meadow lights up, powering the Yacht to the surface, where the adults and Dorami await in their submarine.

Using the Big Light, Dorami restores the Solar Yacht, returning Nobisuke, Yasashiku, Suneki, and Mini-Dora to normal size. They reunite with their parents, and the boys apologize to Dorami, returning Mini-Dora. Nobita expresses regret to Nobisuke for past troubles, which Nobisuke accepts, noting he and his friends had fun despite everything. Mini-Dora escapes Dorami's grasp and playfully clings to Nobisuke, prompting laughter as they return to the future.

== Cast ==
Character	Japanese voice actor
Dorami	Keiko Yokozawa
Mini-Dora	Chie Kitagawa
Nobisuke Nobi Jr.	Noriko Ohara
Suneki Honekawa	Kaneta Kimotsuki
Yasashiku "Giachibi" Gōda	Kazuya Tatekabe
Yukari (Note: Yukari's name is never said, but it is listed in the film's credits.)	Junko Asami
Shizuka Nobi	Michiko Nomura
Suneo Honekawa	Kaneta Kimotsuki
Takeshi "Gian" Gōda	Kazuya Tatekabe
Nobita Nobi	Shingo Hiromori
Announcer	Aruno Tahara
Suneo's secretary	Kazuaki Koide
Boys	Midori Nakasawa; Kyoko Minami; Akemi Shinohara; Sawako Suzuki; Nobue Kobayashi

The short is notably one of the only pieces of Doraemon media where Doraemon himself does not appear, only making a cameo in the photographs seen inside Nobita's family photo album.

== Production ==
It was produced as a concurrent film alongside Doraemon: Nobita and the Birth of Japan. It is the first installment of the Dorami-chan short films and the work that made the character of Mini-Dora famous.

According to Fujiko F. Fujio, because Dorami had very few chances to appear and shine in the Doraemon manga, he felt bad for the fans, so by the time the 10th anniversary of the Doraemon feature films had started, the idea to make a film starring Dorami came up, leading to the beginning of production.

Before creating a summary of the film's story, a meeting was held where the film's director Makoto Moriwaki and other animation staff shared many of their own ideas. Fujiko F. Fujio gave feedback in order to shape the story direction, with the "submarine ranch" featured in the story being an idea of his.

== Soundtrack ==
=== Theme song ===
"Hello! Dorami-chan" (ハロー!ドラミちゃん)
Lyrics: Yumi Yoshimoto / Composition and Arrangement: Shunsuke Kikuchi / Vocals: Satoko Yamano

== Release ==
The short was released theatrically on March 11, 1989 alongside Doraemon: Nobita and the Birth of Japan.

=== Home video ===
The short film received a VHS release in 1997 by Pony Canyon. It got a DVD release that included Doraemon Comes Back and The Doraemons: The Great Operating of Springing Insects!.

=== Streaming ===
In 2024, for the occasion of the 90th anniversary of Fujiko F. Fujio, remastered versions of Dorami-chan: Mini-Dora SOS!!! alongside numerous animated short films of Doraemon, Perman, Esper Mami, and Chimpui were made available to stream on Prime Video Japan as the "Fujiko F. Fujio's 90th Anniversary Film Masterpiece Selection".
