= Tsuide ni Tonchinkan =

Japanese manga series

- First tankōbon volume cover

ついでにとんちんかん
- Manga
- Written by: Koichi Endo
- Published by: Shueisha
- Imprint: Jump Comics
- Magazine: Weekly Shōnen Jump
- Original run: 1985 – 1989
- Volumes: 18
- Anime television series
- Directed by: Yūzō Yamada
- Produced by: Yoshirō Kataoka; Hiromichi Mogaki
- Written by: Takao Koyama (1–16)
- Music by: Shunsuke Kikuchi
- Studio: Studio Comet
- Original network: Fuji TV
- Original run: October 10, 1987 – October 1, 1988
- Episodes: 43
- Manga

Miracle Tonchinkan
- Written by: Koichi Endo
- Published by: Shueisha
- Magazine: Monthly Shōnen Jump
- Original run: 1991 – 1996
- Volumes: 4
- Manga

Original Quest
- Written by: Koichi Endo
- Published by: Shueisha
- Magazine: Monthly Shōnen Jump
- Original run: 1994 – 1995
- Volumes: 1

Tsuide ni Tonchinkan (Japanese: ついでにとんちんかん; 'Miraculous Tonchinkan") (Note: The title has a double meaning, as it can be read as 'Miraculous Tonchinkan', referring to the titular thieves, or as the phrase of the same writing meaning "anyways, it doesn't matter".) is a Japanese manga series written and illustrated by Koichi Endo. It was serialized in Shueisha's shōnen manga magazine Weekly Shōnen Jump from 1985 to 1989, with its chapters collected in 18 tankōbon volumes.

A 43-episode anime television series adaptation, produced by NAS and Fuji Television and animated by Studio Comet, was broadcast on Fuji TV from October 10, 1987, to October 1, 1988.

== Plot ==
The series involves the exploits of the Phantom Thief Tonchinkan, in reality an alias of four different individuals with fighting abilities, Kung-fu master Tonpu, mechanic Chinpei, and psychic Kanko, alongside their nonsensical junior high teacher Nukesaku. The group pull off heists while eluding the grasp of Inspector Dokuoni, who is always on the move to capture them, despite their damage being minimal and the fact they only go after junk.

The manga initially began as a parody of the Phantom Thief genre, with each of the four issuing calling cards stating Tonchinkan's intention to steal a certain worthless object. As the series progressed, the thievery element was toned down in favor of slice-of-life school-based gag comedy, usually revolving around the three students and their teacher encountering something odd or destructive at Reinbou Junior High. Endo himself was aware of this theme change, and poked fun at how often the plot would switch with a gag in a chapter of a caricature of his editor poking out stating "Thievery stories two weeks in a row..."

== Production ==
Tonchinkan began as a two-chapter miniseries in Fresh Jump taking the place of Endo's then-currently transferring series Shinigami-kun, which was moving to Monthly Shōnen Jump. Serialization began in Weekly Shōnen Jump after the two chapters, but the series did not run as long as the former did.

According to Endo, he wanted to draw a gag manga, with the intention of having one of his three series in Weekly Shōnen Jump be a gag series. His first idea for a gag series was shot down by his editor Masahiko Ibaraki, who stated it was boring. Later on, he had figured out the concept of a phantom thief series after watching television, alongside the news that Cat's Eye was soon to end its run in Weekly Shōnen Jump. After the series concluded, Tonchinkan was pitched to the editorial department and work began.

== Media ==
=== Anime ===
Cast

- Leader / Nukesaku Aida: Yō Yoshimura
- Tonchinkan Red / Tonpū Chun (Zhong Dongfeng): Kaneto Shiozawa
- Tonchinkan Green / Chinpei Hatsuyama: Junichi Kanemaru
- Tonchinkan White / Kanko Shirai: Noriko Hidaka
- Police Chief: Hiroshi Ōtake
- Akuzō Dokuoni: Takeshi Aono
- Muyō Amachi: Yoku Shioya
- Ibarakishi: Yusaku Yara
- Andy Jones: Saeko Shimazu
- Pon Honda: Naoko Matsui
- Yatsu Akashi: Tomomichi Nishimura
- Kyōko Yoshizawa: Yōko Kawanami
- Shūzō Dokuoni: Naoki Tatsuta
- Nanashi no Gonbee: Bin Shimada
- Taika no Babaa: Kazuyo Aoki
- Alien: Hiroshi Ōtake & Sukekiyo Kameyama
- Nuke-chan Robo: Yō Yoshimura

==== Theme songs ====
Opening

1. Gomen ne Cowboy (Ushirogami Hikaretai)
2. Hora ne, Haru ga Kita (Ushirogami Hikaretai)
3. Mugiwara de Dance (Akiko Ikuina)

Ending

1. Möbius no Koibito (Ushirogami Hikaretai)
2. Dare mo Shiranai Blue Angel (Ushirogami Hikaretai)
3. Yume ni Aitai (Akiko Ikuina)
