= Ultra B =

Japanese manga series

- Volume 1 of the Ultra B manga,

ウルトラB (Urutora Bi)
- Manga
- Written by: Fujiko Fujio A (Note: Credited as "Fujiko Fujio" until 1987.)
- Published by: Chuokoron-Shinsha
- Original run: 1984 – 1989
- Volumes: 11
- Anime television series
- Directed by: Masuji Haruda; Hiroshi Sasagawa (chief)
- Produced by: Masami Hatano (TV Asahi); Seitaro Kodama; Atsushi Tanaka
- Music by: Shunsuke Kikuchi
- Studio: Shin-Ei Animation
- Original network: TV Asahi
- Original run: 4 April 1987 – 27 March 1989
- Episodes: 118
- Anime film

Ultra B: Black Hole kara no Dokusaisha BB!!
- Directed by: Masuji Haruda; Hiroshi Sasagawa (chief)
- Music by: Shunsuke Kikuchi
- Studio: Shin-Ei Animation
- Released: March 12, 1988
- Runtime: 20 minutes

Ultra B (ウルトラB, Urutora Bi) is a manga series by Fujiko Fujio A. that first made its debut in Chuokoron-Shinsha's Fujiko Fujio Land series of tankōbon books in 1984 and was released in individual tankōbon until 1989. In 1987, the manga was adapted into a 118-episode anime of the same name by Shin-Ei Animation which aired on TV Asahi from 4 April 1987 to 27 March 1989.

== Plot ==
One day, a mysterious alien baby named Ultra B from outer space comes to Earth, and a boy named Michio Suzumoto finds him. He takes him as his own child, much to the surprise of his family. As he discovers he can talk (although not perfectly), walk, and do magic, and he causes havoc for Michio with his powers. Like Nobita Nobi from Doraemon (Another manga series from Abiko's friend Fujiko F. Fujio), Michio does bad at work and is clumsy, so things go worse when it comes to UB's mischief, even though he's only a baby. The manga and anime tells the story of the duo and their adventures.

== Cast ==
- Yuko Mita as Ultra B (Also known as UB, in Japanese ユビ, Yubi)
- Chiyoko Kawashima as Michio Suzumoto
- Naoko Matsui as Takemi Aoba
- Shigeru Chiba as Tateo Tosaka
- Gara Takashima as Kasumi
- Sukekiyo Kameyama as Daibutsu Tanyoika
- Kaneta Kimotsuki as Shinichi Suzumoto
- Kazuyo Aoki as Dota Yukei
- Masako Nozawa as Kazuyo Suzumoto
- Rei Sakuma as Doji

== Music ==
Opening Theme Song - "Babibabibabibu Ultra B" (バビバビバビブー ウルトラB) Performed by Yuko Mita feat Morinoki Children's Chorus | Music composed by Shunsuke Kikuchi | Lyrics written by Fujiko Fujio A

Ending Theme Song - "Kiss Ultra B" (ウルトラBにチュッ!, Movie Only) Performed by Bunkekana and Koorogi '73 | Music composed by Shunsuke Kikuchi | Lyrics written by Takada Hiroo
