= Doraemon: Nobita and the Castle of the Undersea Devil =

1983 film by Tsutomu Shibayama

Doraemon the Movie: Nobita and the Castle of the Undersea Devil
- Theatrical release poster
- Kanji: ドラえもん: のび太の海底鬼岩城
- Revised Hepburn: Doraemon: Nobita no Kaiteiki Ganjō
- Directed by: Tsutomu Shibayama
- Screenplay by: Fujiko Fujio
- Based on: Doraemon's Long Stories: Nobita and the Castle of the Undersea Devil by Fujiko Fujio
- Produced by: Sōichi Besshi; Tetsuo Kanno
- Starring: Nobuyo Ōyama; Noriko Ohara; Michiko Nomura; Kaneta Kimotsuki; Kazuya Tatekabe; Michie Kita; Yūji Mitsuya; Teiji Ōmiya; Kōsei Tomita; Hozumi Gōda
- Edited by: Kazuo Inoue; Noriko Tsurumaki
- Music by: Shunsuke Kikuchi
- Production company: Shin-Ei Animation
- Distributed by: Toho
- Release date: 12 March 1983
- Running time: 95 minutes
- Country: Japan
- Language: Japanese
- Box office: $16.5 million

Doraemon: Nobita and the Castle of the Undersea Devil (ドラえもん のび太の海底鬼岩城, Doraemon Nobita no Kaiteiki Ganjō) is a 1983 Japanese animated science fantasy film and the fourth Doraemon feature film, released on March 12, 1983, in Japan. Being the first film in the series to be directed by Tsutomu Shibayama, the film is loosely based on the Western myth of Atlantis, the mythical continent of Mu and the 1980 chapter "8 Days at the Dragon King's Palace".

A modern remake of the film, Doraemon: New Nobita and the Castle of the Undersea Devil, released in theaters on February 27, 2026.

== Plot ==
The film opens with the main characters arguing over where to go for their camping trip, with Nobita, Shizuka and Doraemon deciding to go to the coast while Gian and Suneo decide to go to the mountains. The plan is temporarily foiled when Nobita's mom tells him to go finish his homework, but when the Bermuda Triangle is on the news, Gian and Suneo decide the join the other three. The main cast finally go camping after helping Nobita to finish his homework. They use an adaptation light to survive underwater, and an underwater buggy named Buggy, to commute. Buggy has feelings and likes Shizuka due to her being female. Doraemon takes out a big tent that provides all their needs, and that night they have a barbecue, with Gian and Suneo wanting to go the Atlantic but disallowed by Doraemon. That night, Gian and Suneo take Buggy and travel through the Atlantic Ocean, trying to find a treasure ship. However they didn't realize that the effects of the adaptation light can fade over time, they lose consciousness, and their friends, who have been looking for them, think they're dead, but they somehow wake up after them crying. They find the treasure ship mentioned on the news, Nobita, who is outside, sees a strange fish shaped craft that started attacking him with an energy weapon. He managed to evade it, but the others absurdly refuse to believe his story.

That night, Buggy wakes Shizuka and reveals he saw what happened with Gian and Suneo when they lost consciousness, showing his memory like a movie projector. The footage shows a strange underwater craft that's controlled by two human like figures. Soon, everyone else watches the footage as well, seeing these "sea people" saving Gian and Suneo with their own Adaptation Light, before the craft Nobita saw appears and starts attacking them. Not long after, a giant squid appears and attacks the group, breaking their camp, but a strange light knocks the creature out. The group then sees the "sea people" in front of them, but they too were knocked out by the stunning light.

Nobita, Doraemon, and Shizuka later wakes up in a room where they meet one of the sea man called Eru, revealed to be inhabitants of the underwater kingdom of Mu. The Prime Minister of Mu welcomes the group, but doesn't allow them to leave due to the kingdom not wanting humans to know about their existence. While Gian and Suneo are put in a cell due to their personalities, the group rescues them and flee the kingdom, with Eru realizing their escape and giving chase. Doraemon then uses his hat, which turns into be a subterranean room that can move, causing Eru to lose sight of them. However, the fish craft suddenly attacks Eru, shooting his ship. Gian rushes out with the group to save Eru, but it caused all of them to be arrested and given the death sentence for crossing the border.

While the group is put in a cell, Eru tries to defend them in a trial, which got interrupted by a ship crash landing. It is revealed that another undersea kingdom, Atlantis, now controlled by robots, is about to destroy the Earth with nuclear weapons after mistaking a volcano eruption for an invasion. After convincing the Prime minister, Eru sets the group free and goes on a journey with them into Atlantis, which is in the Bermuda Triangle. After bypassing a fleet of fish craft and the barrier that leads into the kingdom with Doraemon's hat, they went on to search the "Devil's Castle", where Atlantis' main computer, Poseidon resides. But having difficulty looking for it, Shizuka allows herself to be captured by Poseidon's iron guards, so the group can follow it as she's taken to the castle.

Using Doraemon's weapon gadgets, the group enters the castle, facing hordes of iron guards, while Shizuka is brought upon Poseidon, they got separated. Doraemon falls from a high place, while Eru, Nobita, Gian, and Suneo get captured by the iron guards. Just as Poseidon about to sacrifice Shizuka, thinking it will stop the volcano, Doraemon stops it, but falls unconscious shortly. As Shizuka cries over Doraemon, Buggy suddenly appears from Doraemon's pocket due to Shizuka crying, and goes straight into Poseidon, crashing and destroying both of them. With Poseidon destroyed, the iron guards stops working, allowing Shizuka and Doraemon to rescue the others and leave before the erupting volcano destroys the castle & all the nuclear weaponry. After returning to Mu, Doraemon and his friends are hailed as heroes.

The film ends with Shizuka looking at one of buggy's screws that it left behind, and the group saying farewell to Eru and returning home.

== Cast ==
Character	Japanese voice actor
Doraemon	Nobuyo Ōyama
Nobita Nobi	Noriko Ohara
Shizuka Minamoto	Michiko Nomura
Takeshi "Gian" Gōda	Kazuya Tatekabe
Suneo Honekawa	Kaneta Kimotsuki
Eru	Michie Kita
Underwater Buggy	Yūji Mitsuya
Mu Prime Minister	Teiji Ōmiya
Poseidon	Kōsei Tomita
Announcer	Hozumi Gōda
Mu Patrolling Crew	Fumio Matsuoka; Masaharu Satō; Kōji Totani; Kōzō Shioya; Kōichi Hashimoto
Tamako Nobi	Sachiko Chijimatsu
Nobisuke Nobi	Masayuki Katō
Michiko Minamoto	Masako Matsubara
Mrs. Honekawa	Yoshino Ohtori
Mrs. Gōda	Kazuyo Aoki

== Remake ==
On September 6, 2025, it was announced that a remake titled Doraemon: New Nobita and the Castle of the Undersea Devil, was in development.

Directed by Tetsuo Yajima with a screenplay written by Isao Murayama, the film was released on February 27, 2026. It became the number one movie at the box office for six weeks and has grossed over $23,226,338 so far.

One week after the film's release, the director of the original movie, Tsutomu Shibayama, died at the age of 84.

== See also ==
- List of Doraemon films
