= ZIV International =

Television production and distribution company

ZIV International, Inc.
- Trade name: Ziv International
- Type: Private
- Genre: Studio
- Founded: 1971
- Founder: Irv Holender
- Defunct: 1986
- Successors: Lorimar Telepictures; Telepictures; Warner Bros. Domestic Television Distribution; Library: Coral Pictures
- Headquarters: 600 N.Sepulveda Blvd., Los Angeles, California, USA
- Owner: Independent (1971-1981); Lorimar-Telepictures (1982-1985); RCTV International (1986-2000)
- Parent: Independent (1971-1982); Lorimar Television (1982-1986); Coral Pictures (1986-2000)

ZIV International was an American production and distribution company founded in 1971 by Irv Holender. In the late 1970s and early 1980s, it distributed Americanised versions of European animated cartoons and Japanese anime series, and produced and distributed celebrity biographies. WorldCat recognises 83 works in 97 publications.

Holender sold his company and library to Lorimar Productions in 1982, while the library contents were sold to Coral Pictures in 1986.

== Shows produced or distributed ==
The following television shows were distributed and/or produced by ZIV International. Production credits typically involve dubbing a foreign language release into English and/or Spanish, and replacing the soundtrack with one composed by Mark Mercury.

- Adventures of Sinbad the Sailor — Producer
- The Adventures of Spunky and Tadpole — Distributor
- Candy Candy — Producer
- Captain Future — Distributor, Producer
- Space Pirate Captain Harlock — Producer
- Clutch Cargo — Distributor
- Fables of the Green Forest — Distributor, Producer
- Gaiking — Producer
- Flower Angel — Distributor, Producer
- Force Five — Distributor
- The Gumby Show — Distributor
- James Dean: The First American Teenager — Distributor
- King Arthur & the Knights of the Round Table — Distributor
- Little Lulu and Her Little Friends — Distributor, Producer
- Little Memole — Distributor, Producer
- Magnos the Robot — Producer
- Nickel Mountain — Distributor
- Space Angel — Distributor
- Sci-Fi West Saga Starzinger — Producer
- Zukkoke Knight - Don De La Mancha — Distributor
