= Michie Kita =

Japanese actress (1935–2024)

- 喜多 道枝
- Born: Michie Ogata (纓片 道枝); March 11, 1935; Tokyo Prefecture, Japan
- Died: November 6, 2024 (aged 89); Tokyo, Japan
- Occupations: Actress; voice actress; narrator
- Years active: 1960–2024
- Agent: Kiraboshi
- Children: Mao (eldest son)
- Father: Minoru Kita
- Relatives: Setsuyo Kita (brother); Roppeita Kita (brother)

Michie Ogata (纓片 道枝, Ogata Michie; March 11, 1935 – November 6, 2024), known professionally as Michie Kita (喜多 道枝, Kita Michie), was a Japanese actress. She is best known for her anime voice acting roles as Nello Daas in Dog of Flanders, Eru in Doraemon: Nobita and the Castle of the Undersea Devil, Doronpa in Obake no Q-Tarō, Galahad in King Arthur, Franz Charming in Princess Knight, Nobuhiko Ōbayashi in Don Dracula, and Togenicia in Hana no Ko Lunlun.

== Biography ==
Kita was born in Tokyo Prefecture, Japan on March 11, 1935. Her father was Minoru Kita (喜多 実, Kita Minoru; February 23, 1900 – October 2, 1986) and her brothers were Setsuyo Kita (喜多 節世, Kita Setsuyo; August 31, 1926 – April 9, 2003) and Roppeita Kita (喜多 六平太, Kita Roppeita; December 6, 1924 – February 21, 2016).

Ever since she was a little girl, Kita loved theater and wanted to become an actress.

She graduated from Tokyo Metropolitan Toyotama High School and was a fifth generation graduate of the Haiyuza Theatre Company Attached Actors Training School.

She had been previously affiliated with Gekidan Nakama, the Shiki Theatre Company, Tokyo Engeki Shudan TES, Union Pro, and Grue, with her final affiliation being with Kiraboshi.

=== Death ===
Kita died of senility in Tokyo on November 6, 2024, at the age of 89. On the day's morning, Kita was energetic and had seen her eldest son Mao head off to work, but when he returned home later, he found her collapsed body. She was scheduled to make a talk show appearance the same month, with her agency Kiraboshi noting that she hadn't been sick and remained active throughout her life.

== Personality ==
Kita's vocal range was soprano. Her neat and attractive voice was "captivating."

She was considered memorable for her roles as an innocent and sweet-natured boy.

== Filmography ==
=== Feature films ===
List of performances in feature films
Year	Title	Role	Notes	Source
1958	Stolen Desire	Chigusa Yamamura		
1999	Saimin	Middle-Aged Woman		
2015	You're A Good Kid	Akiko Sasaki		
2016	Golden Orchestra!	Shimako Miyazaki		
2018	Hoshi ni Katarite			

=== Television animation ===
List of voice performances in television animation
Year	Title	Role	Notes	Source
1963	Astro Boy	Additional voice		
1965	Obake no Q-Tarō	Doronpa		
1967	Princess Knight	Franz Charming		
1968	The Monster Kid	Prince Demokin		
1968	Star of the Giants	Additional voice		
1970	Otoko Doahō Kōshien	Ayumi Asano		
1970	The Adventures of Hutch the Honeybee	Additional voice		
1971	The Extravagant Muchabei	Additional voice		
1972	Science Ninja Team Gatchaman	Makoto Takahara		
1974	Urikupen Kyūjotai	Shōtarō the Rabbit		
1975	Time Bokan	Ushiwakamaru		
1975	Dog of Flanders	Nello Daas		
1976	Paul's Miraculous Adventure	Pete, Painter, Zero		
1976	UFO Warrior Dai Apolon	Moira		
1977	Nobody's Boy: Remi	Grace	Ep. 9	
1977	Ippatsu Kanta-kun	Mitsuo		
1977	Tōshō Daimos	Sayuri		
1979	King Arthur	Galahad		
1979	Hana no Ko Lunlun	Togenicia, Narration		
1979	Future Robot Daltanious	Kaori		
1980	Space Warrior Baldios	Wife		
1980	The Wonderful Adventures of Nils	Peter	Ep. 14	
1981	The Monster Kid	Tōfu		
1981	The Swiss Family Robinson: Flone of the Mysterious Island	Wolfgang Amadeus Mozart		
1981	Fisherman Sanpei	Ikuo		
1981	Yattodetaman	Alan		
1982	Don Dracula	Nobuhiko Ōbayashi	Eps 4, 6	
1988	Oishinbo	Chef Nagata, Kamura's wife		
2008	Natsume's Book of Friends	Hana		
2008	Porphy no Nagai Tabi	Heinz von Eisenberg		

==== Theatrical animation ====
List of voice performances in theatrical animation
Year	Title	Role	Notes	Source
1980	Hana no Ko Lunlun Konnichiwa Sakura no Kuni	Togenicia, Narration		
1983	Doraemon: Nobita and the Castle of the Undersea Devil	Eru		

=== Radio programs ===
List of voice performances in radio programs
Year	Title	Role	Notes	Source
1967	Puck In Music	Pack		
