= Kiraboshi =

Kiraboshi (有限会社希楽星, Yūgen Kaisha Kiraboshi) is an actor, voice actor, model and tarento management firm established on February 16, 2000, in Shibuya, Tokyo, Japan.

== Clients ==
Listed alphabetically by gender and surname.

=== Male ===
- Rokurō Abe
- Kazuo Arai
- Keisuke Arimura
- Shinpei Asanuki
- Itaru Fujimoto
- Shinji Furukawa
- Satoru Hamaguchi
- Homare Hasegawa
- Tatsuo Hēderu
- Jin Honda
- Kiyozumi Honda
- Kiyohiko Ichihara
- Masahiro Itō
- Eiken Jōji
- Sukekiyo Kameyama
- Tarō Kanasugi
- Tomotaka Kanzaki
- Kōichi Kase
- Osamu Katō
- Yasuke Kawarada
- Tomimasa Kikuguchi
- Yūtarō Kikuhara
- Yūichi Kizaki
- Mitsumasa Kishimoto
- Akira Kubo
- Kyūtarō
- Masaaki Maeda
- Akira Matsumura
- Hikojirō Matsumura
- Shigeo Matsuzaki
- Yūzō Mikawa
- Keisuke Miyata
- Kōta Mizumori
- Kiyuki Mori
- Kōji Muta
- Masakazu Nagakura
- Kensei Nakata
- Katsumi Nakayama
- Satoshi Ninomiya
- Shūgo Nishiyama
- Shinji Nomura
- Ryūhei Numata
- Yū Numazaki
- Tadashi Okuno
- Hiroshi Ōtsuka
- Katsuhiro Oyama
- Saikatsu
- Akira Satō
- Yūichi Satō
- Masaru Saitō
- Kazunori Shigeki
- Taizō Shiina
- Eiji Shima
- Kei Sunaga
- Tatsuya Suzuki
- Jin Tamagawa
- Mitsutaka Tanaka
- Ryū Tenkenji
- Takao Toji
- Toshio
- Yūsuke Tozawa
- Jun Yakushiji
- Momoki Yamada
- Kappa Yamaguchi
- Mitsuru Yamazaki
- Itaru Yoshimoto

=== Female ===
- Rumiko Amemiya
- Kazuyo Aoki
- Chikako Asai
- Takako Ashizawa
- Keiko Azuma
- Matsumi Fuku
- Yōko Fujimoto
- Mai Fujisaki
- Miho Hirata
- Kei Hirosawa
- Akiko Hoshino
- Chieko Ichikawa
- Nori Ichinose
- Mami Inoue
- Chika Itō
- Yoriko Kamimura
- Hiroko Kaneko
- Chiemi Karaki
- Chizuko Kida
- Kaori Kikuchi
- Emima Kimura
- Midori Kimura
- Mika Kinose
- Michie Kita
- Chie Kitagawa
- Tomomi Kiuchi
- Setsuko Kobayashi
- Kotoyo Komori
- Ayuko Koyama
- Machiko Matsuda
- Akira Matsuoka
- Yōko Mikami
- Yūko Miwa
- Junko Miyauchi
- Kōko Mori
- Akari Moriya
- Yōko Nakayanagi
- Atsuko Nakazawa
- Yoshimi Narita
- Konomi Ogasawara
- Marie Ōmura
- Emiko Onda
- Mari Sakai
- Hana Shimaoka
- Eri Shimomura
- Ako Suizu
- Hiromi Suzuki
- Moyu Taguchi
- Kayo Takasaki
- Yū Tateishi
- Kumiko Tatsuzuki
- Michiko Tomura
- Yoshie Uehara
- Taka Uenohara
- Miyoko Yamaguchi
- Yuriko
