= Chie Kitagawa =

Japanese actress (born 1933)

- 北川 智繪
- Kitagawa in a studio around 1955
- Born: Chieko Itō (伊藤 智恵子); December 14, 1933 (age 92); Tokyo, Japan
- Other name: Chieko Kitagawa (北川 智恵子)
- Occupations: Actress; voice actress; narrator; storyteller; founder
- Years active: 1959–present
- Agent: Kiraboshi
- Children: Mami Kōzuki
- Website: Official website (in Japanese)

Chieko Itō (伊藤 智恵子, Itō Chieko; née Kitagawa, born December 14, 1933), known professionally as Chie Kitagawa (北川 智繪, Kitagawa Chie), is a Japanese actress and voice actress from Tokyo. She is also the founder of the Wagei-Sha Storytelling School.

She is also very well known for her voice acting roles as Taeko's Grandmother in Only Yesterday, Mombi in The Wonderful Wizard of Oz, Tsuru Nohara in Crayon Shin-chan: The Storm Called: The Adult Empire Strikes Back, Mini-Dora in Dorami-chan: Mini-Dora SOS!!!, Okanagan in Shadow Hearts: From the New World, Kiyo Shimizu in Disaster Report 4 Plus: Summer Memories, Matsu in Ranma ½, and Hedwig the Sea Witch in Saban's Adventures of the Little Mermaid.

== Biography ==
Kitagawa was born on December 14, 1933 in Tokyo, Japan.

She has been affiliated with Kiraboshi.

In film credit names and other places, variations of her name such as "Chie Kitagawa" (北川智絵) and "Chie Kitagawa" (北川知絵) were used. She also formerly performed under the stage name "Chieko Kitagawa" (北川 智恵子).

Kitagawa graduated from Kumagaya High School and joined the Japan Academy of Arts.

She has previously been affiliated with Gekidan Aoi Mi no Kai, Talent Agent, Tokyo Actor's Consumer's Cooperative Society, Dojinsha Production, and Grue.

She currently serves as the director of Wageisha, an organization dedicated to the art of storytelling.

== Personality ==
Kitagawa specializes in performing child character roles and old lady character roles.

Her personal hobbies are reading and gardening.

Her favorite color is green.

Her daughter is Mami Kōzuki and her stepson is Tatsuhiko Ito.

== Successors ==
The following individuals have taken over Kitagawa's voice acting roles after she stepped down.

Successor	Character	Work	Debut
Kikumi Umeda	Tsuru Nohara	Crayon Shin-chan	Broadcast on July 12, 2013
Ema Kujira	Sayuri Tano	Nintama Rantarō	

== Filmography ==
=== Television drama ===
List of appearances in television dramas
Year	Title	Role	Notes	Source
1979	Big Sister Ma			
1980	Mr. Kinpachi in Class 3B	Takiyo Aoki		
1981	Honjitsu mo Seiten Nari	Hiroko Yonemura		
1981	Onna Taikōki	Yashio		
1983	Oshin	Hamamura Sugi		
1983	Shin On'na Sōsa-Kan	Appearance	Ep. 8	
1983	Mataauhi			
1985	Uchi no Ko ni Kagitte...	Trimmer	Series 2, Ep. 11	
1985	Fuufu Seikatsu			
1990	Winter Flower: Yuko	Oryu		
1993	Kasai no Hito			
1993	Hayabusa Shinpachi Goyoucho			
1999	Bayside Shakedown	Shimonita Resident		
2000	Hanamura Daisuke			
2002	Koi wa Sniper Episode 2			
2003	Tales of Terror from Tokyo and All Over Japan			

=== Theatrical films ===
List of appearances in theatrical films
Year	Title	Role	Notes	Source
1996	Gakkō no Kaidan 2			

=== Television animation ===
- Kaminari Boy Pikkari-bee (1967): Grandma
- Adventure on the Gaboten Island (1967): Kyuuri
- Princess Knight (1967): Plastic
- Animal 1 (1968): Saburō Azuma
- The Monster Kid (1968): Additional voice
- Star of the Giants (1968): Masahiro Samon
- Attack No. 1 (1969): Keiko Kudo, Shizuka (Second voice), Yamamoto (Second voice)
- Sabu to Ichi Torimono Hikae (1969): Maid
- Chingō Muchabei (1971): Additional voice
- Akado Suzunosuke (1972): Additional voice
- Onbu Obake (1972): Gon
- The Gutsy Frog (1972): Additional voice
- Jungle Kurobe (1973): Additional voice
- Majokko Megu-chan (1974): Additional voice
- My Neighbor Tamageta-kun (1974): Additional voice
- Laura, the Prairie Girl (1975): Suzie
- First Human Giatrus (1975): Additional voice
- 3000 Leagues in Search of Mother (1976): Emilio (First voice)
- Manga Hana no Kakarichō (1976): Employees
- Blocker Gundan 4 Machine Blaster (1976): Baaya (Ep. 25)
- Robokko Beeton (1976): Tonko (First voice)
- New Star of the Giants II (1979): Additional voice
- The Monster Kid (1980): Matakuru-san
- Zukkoke Knight - Don De La Mancha (1980): Additional voice
- The Adventures of Tom Sawyer (1980): Maid, Maggie
- Belle and Sebastion (1981): Lorenza, Juan
- Saikyo Robo Daioja (1981): Ryan (childhood)
- Dash Kappei (1982): Umee Jin (Kappei's Grandma)
- Yasei no Sakebi (1982): Additional voice
- Perman (1983): Child B, Grandma, Student, Sub's Mother, Ta-bo, Tatsuo
- Noozles (1984): Grandma
- Creamy Mami, the Magic Angel (1984): Bamboo
- Anmitsu Hime (1986): Tome, Kitōshi
- The Wonderful Wizard of Oz (1986): Mombi
- Animated Classics of Japanese Literature (1986): Fusa Koga
- Mami the Psychic (1987): Kadai Hazama (Ep. 6)
- Grimm's Fairy Tale Classics (1987): Stepmother
- City Hunter (1987): Ichiro Washio (Ep. 44)
- Norakuro-kun (1988): Elderly Housekeeper
- The Adventures of Hutch the Honeybee (1989): Chatty Old Lady
- Ranma ½ (1989): Matsu (Eps 97, 130, and 152)
- Oishinbo (1990): Landlady, Etsuko Sekimoto, Osato
- Doraemon (1990): Mini-Dora (first voice) (Ep. 1074)
- Saban's Adventures of the Little Mermaid (1991): Hedwig the Sea Witch
- Crayon Shin-chan (1992): Tsuru Nohara (First voice)
- Hobberdy Dick (1992): Bob
- Delightful Moomin Family: Adventure Diary (1992): Mysterious Old Woman
- Cooking Papa (1993): Koma
- Nintama Rantarō (1993): Sayuri Tano (First voice)
- Sorcerer Hunters (1995): Old Woman (Ep. 15)
- The Life and Adventures of Santa Claus (1996): Judy (Ep. 8)
- Hareluya II Boy (1997): Toshi
- Great Detective Conan (2001): Mikoto Shimabukuro (Eps 222-224)
- KochiKame: Tokyo Beat Cops (2003): Countess Chris T (Ep. 302)
- Mushishi (2005): Old Lady
- Kaze no Shoujo Emily (2007): Caroline Priest

=== Theatrical animation ===
List of voice performances in theatrical animation
Year	Title	Role	Notes	Source
1970	Attack No. 1: Revolution	Additional voice		
1989	Dorami-chan: Mini-Dora SOS!!!	Mini-Dora	Short film	
1991	Only Yesterday	Taeko's grandmother		
2001	Crayon Shin-chan: The Storm Called: The Adult Empire Strikes Back	Tsuru Nohara		

=== Video games ===
- Doraemon 2: SOS! Otogi no Kuni (1997): Witch
- Shadow Hearts: From the New World (2005): Okanagan
- Crayon Shin-Chan Obaka Daininden (2010): Tsuru Nohara
- Disaster Report 4 Plus: Summer Memories (2018): Kiyo Shimizu

=== Dubbing ===
==== Movie ====
- Addams Family Reunion (1998): Grandmama Addams (Alice Ghostley)
- Alligator (1980): Madeline Kendall (Patti Jerome) (Fuji TV version)
- A Chinese Ghost Story III (1991): Tree Devil (Lao Lao) (Lau Siu-ming)
- Gone in 60 Seconds (1974) (Nippon Television version)
- Police Academy 4: Citizens on Patrol (1987): Mrs. Lois Feldman (Billie Bird) (TBS version)

==== Drama ====
- Columbo (1968): Soul Crusader Tailor

==== Puppet shows ====
- Goronta Theater (from Okaasan to Issho) (1976): Cham Cham
- King Arthur (1970s)
