= Hana no Ko Lunlun =

Japanese anime television series

- Lulu the Flower Angel
- Logo for Hana no Ko Lunlun

花の子ルンルン (Hana no Ko Runrun)
- Genre: Magical girl
- Created by: Shiro Jinbo
- Anime television series
- Directed by: Various
- Written by: Various
- Studio: Toei Animation
- Original network: ANN (TV Asahi)
- Original run: February 9, 1979 – February 8, 1980
- Episodes: 50
- Anime film

Hello Cherry Country
- Studio: Toei Animation
- Released: March 15, 1980 (Japan)
- Runtime: 15 minutes

Lulu the Flower Angel (花の子ルンルン, Hana no Ko Runrun; lit. 'Lunlun the Flower Child') is a 1979 magical girl anime by Toei Animation, focusing on a theme of flowers in its stories. It was directed by Hiroshi Shidara and written by Shiro Jinbo. It was greatly successful in the West, particularly in Europe and in Latin America, as well as in Japan. An edited English-language dub of a few episodes titled Angel made this series one of, if not the first, magical girl anime works to reach the English-speaking market in the United States and Canada, well over a decade before Sailor Moon.

A theatrical short film, Hello Cherry Country (こんにちは桜の国, Konnichiwa Sakura no Kuni), was released in March 1980.

In 2009, William Winckler Productions produced two all-new English-dubbed movie versions edited from the original series titled Lun-Lun the Flower Girl and Lun-Lun the Flower Girl 2. Producer William Winckler, known for Tekkaman: The Space Knight, wrote, produced and directed the English films, which are seen on broadband in Japan.

A Chinese-Japanese sequel produced by Tencent Video and Toei Animation's Shanghai branch is in production. It was originally announced as a remake.

== Story ==
Long ago, plant spirits and fairy-like creatures lived in harmony with mankind. Gradually humans began to rise toward greed and cruelty, and the plant spirits immigrated to another world they dubbed "Flowern", but their legacy remained in people who truly knew the meaning of love and kindness. A talking dog and cat pair, Nouveau and Cateau, were sent to Earth to find the "flower child" to find the "Seven Color Flower" — the symbol of Flowern's ruling family — so that a new ruler can ascend the throne.

In France they meet Lunlun Flower, a tomboyish and outspoken young orphan who lives with her paternal grandparents who own a flower shop. Lunlun's late mother turns out to be a descendant of the Flowern people, making her the "flower child". Nouveau and Cateau ask Lunlun to help them find the magical flower, and she accepts. The trio tour all of Europe in pursuit of the bloom while offering assistance to those they encounter.

Lunlun, Nouveau and Cateau are followed by a pair of villains: the selfish Togenicia and her servant Yavoque, who want to steal the flower and rule Flowern. Whenever Lunlun and her friends attempt to help people, Togenicia and Yavoque try to get them back on the road by force, only to fail. They are aided by Serge, a mysterious photographer who gives the people a packets of flower seeds which symbolize the lesson they have learned in the "language of flowers". For instance, thistles, which signify independence, are given when the son of a farmer vows to follow his dreams and leave home. Lunlun develops a crush on Serge due to his kindness, and he is implied to like her back.

The people that Lunlun helps send flower seeds to Lunlun's grandparents and tell them about their amazing granddaughter, and in the end, the magical flower is found growing in his garden, saving it from destruction after an attack from Togenicia. The photographer Serge turns out to be the prince of Flowern, and he confirms that he loves Lunlun and asks her to be his queen. Lunlun rejects his proposal, however, since she loves Serge with all of her heart but does not want to live on Flowern. Serge cedes the throne to his younger brother so he can live on Earth with Lunlun.

At the start of the series, Lunlun is given a magical pin from the King of Flowern. This pin, when a flower is reflected in its mirror, gives Lunlun a new outfit for an activity, such as mountain climbing. About halfway through the series, the pin is broken when Lunlun falls from a branch overhanging a waterfall while trying to attract attention after being caught in the Pollen Storm (Togenicia's main form of attack). While she is lost in the river, a new pin is given to her in the shape of the royal crest, with the warning that if it is ever lost or broken, her life on Earth will end and she will be unable to return to Flowern. The words to activate this pin are "Fleur Fleur Fleur".

== Main characters ==
Lunlun/Lulu (ルンルン) Voiced by: Mari Okamoto
A kind girl from Southern France who is actually the fabled "flower child", Lunlun lives with her grandparents who own a floral shop. She joins Cateau and Nouveau in their search for the "Seven Colored Flower".

Cateau (キャトー) Voiced by: Fuyumi Shiraishi
An envoy from the planet Flowern and one of Lunlun's travel companions, Cateau disguises himself as a small white cat.

Nouveau (ヌーボ) Voiced by: Takuzo Kamiyama
An envoy from the planet Flowern and one of Lunlun's travel companions, Nouveau disguises himself as a large dog.

Serge (セルジュ) Voiced by: Yū Mizushima
Serge is a mysterious photographer who helps Lunlun throughout her quest. At the end of each episode he gifts flower seeds to people who have met Lunlun.

Togenicia (トゲニシア, Togenishia) Voiced by: Michie Kita
Togenicia is a wicked fairy who wants to become the Queen of Flowern. She and her comrade follow Lunlun so they can steal the legendary flower from her. Togenicia's main attack, "Pollen Storm", causes her face to wrinkle. She was modeled after Vivien Leigh.

Yavoque (ヤボーキ) Voiced by: Sanji Hase
Yavoque is Togenicia's bumbling sidekick. Although he is a flower spirit, he resembles a Japanese raccoon dog. Yavoque can transform himself with a black umbrella.

Lunlun's Grandmother (ルンルンのおばあちゃん) Voiced by: Reiko Suzuki
A kind and gentle old woman, she acts as a maternal figure to Lunlun.

Lunlun's Grandfather (ルンルンのおじいちゃん) Voiced by: Keaton Yamada
Lunlun's maternal grandfather, he tells Lunlun about the legend of the flower spirits.

== International titles ==
Cover of the first DVD box

- Lulu the Flower Angel (Official English title by Toei)
- Flower Angel (English dub, U.K.; produced by Harmony Gold)
- Angel (English dub, U.S.; produced by ZIV International)
- Lulú, la Chica de las Flores or El Misterio de la Flor Mágica (Castilian Spanish dub)
- Ángel, la Niña de las Flores (Latin American Spanish dub)
- Angel, a Menina das Flores (Brazilian Portuguese dub)
- Angélica (Brazilian Portuguese alternative title dub)
- Le tour de monde de Lydie (French dub)
- Lulu l'angelo tra i fiori (Italian dub)
- Ейнджъл — детето на цветята (Bulgarian dub)
- Lidia in jurul lumii (Romanian dub)
- Лулу — ангел цветов (Russian dub)
- Lili, a virágangyal (Hungarian dub)
- Lulu, the Flower Girl (Indonesian sub)
- Lulu (Filipino dub)
- Ronron the Flower Angel (English dub, Philippines)
- Saosan, Al Zahrah Al Jamilah (سوسن، الزهرة الجميلة) (Arabic dub)
- Lulu i cudowny kwiat (Polish lector)
- Çiçek Kız (Turkish dub)
- 꽃천사 루루 (Korean dub)
- 花仙子 (Huaxianzi) (Mandarin dub)
- זהבית (Zehavit) (Hebrew dub)
- สาวน้อยแองเจิ้ล (Sao noi Angel) (Thai dub)
- Angel, das Blumenmädchen (German dub)
- Angel (Dutch dub; based on ZIV International's English dub)

== English-language versions ==
Initially, ZIV International acquired the series for the U.S. in 1980. At least the first four episodes were dubbed into English, with a new theme song and score by house composer Mark Mercury. In this incarnation, the characters were renamed to Angel (Lunlun), Cathy (Cateau), Wendal (Nouveau), Melicia (Togenicia) and Ivan (Yavoque). The episodes were then packaged into one presentation in 1981, which aired on HBO and was released on videocassette by Media Home Entertainment as Angel and by Family Home Entertainment as Flower Angel. The first two episodes of the ZIV dub were released on DVD as part of the Fairy Tale Adventures compilation from TCG Direct in 2009.

In 1985, ZIV licensed their rights to Harmony Gold, who released a feature-film length condensation of the series with another new dub cast and music score. Again, the characters were renamed, this time to Angel (Lunlun), Lily (Cateau), Periwinkle (Nouveau), Princess Wysteria (Togenicia), Ragweed (Yavoque) and Stefan (Serge). The episodes that were featured in the film were episodes 1, 7, 24, 29, 49 and 50. The 37th episode was also covered but it was only the intro to coincide with the beginning events of the 49th episode. The ending was rewritten to change Stefan (Serge)'s true identity.

This film was not released in America, but received multiple VHS releases in the UK.

== Reception ==
In 2005, Japanese television network TV Asahi conducted an online web poll for the top 100 anime, and Hana no Ko Lunlun placed 85th tied with Ikkyū-san.
