= King Arthur: Prince on White Horse =

Japanese anime television series

燃えろアーサー 白馬の王子 (Moero Āsā Hakuba no Ōji)
- Anime television series
- Studio: Toei Animation
- Original network: Fuji TV
- Original run: April 6, 1980 – September 21, 1980
- Episodes: 22

King Arthur: Prince on White Horse, known in Japan as Moero Arthur Hakuba no Ōji (燃えろアーサー 白馬の王子, Moero Āsā Hakuba no Ōji, lit. Burn, Arthur: The Prince of the White Horse), is a Japanese anime series based on the Arthurian legend. It is a sequel to the earlier series King Arthur and the Knights of the Round Table, reworked in a futuristic setting. Produced by Toei Animation, it was released between April 6 and September 21, 1980, and consisted of 22 half-hour episodes.

== Translation ==
The series is in 22 parts and was translated into several languages:

- King Arthur 2ème série (French)
- King Arthur: Prince on White Horse (English)
- La spada di King Arthur (Italian)
- Prinz Arthus (German)

== Japanese cast ==
- Akira Kamiya as Arthur
- Chikao Ohtsuka as Bossman
- Keiko Yamamoto as Pete
- Isamu Tanonaka as Sandee
- Kouji Totani as Baron

== Episode titles ==
1. 1980-04-06 Frightful! The Spaceship that Hovers in the Sky
2. 1980-04-13 Shocked! Bear-man Appears
3. 1980-04-20 Do not Take out the Hand that Holds the Secret Coin
4. 1980-04-27 Capture the Thief!
5. 1980-05-04 One Man! Rescue Peet
6. 1980-05-11 The Magical Flower which Takes Away Lives
7. 1980-05-25 Defeat the Evil Heir
8. 1980-06-01 Who is the Imposter!
9. 1980-06-08 Baseball Relay
10. 1980-06-15 Ride on, Wild Pony
11. 1980-06-22 Protect the Princess from the Pirate Ship
12. 1980-06-29 The Rose Flower which Scatters Love
13. 1980-07-06 Who? The True Identity of the King from the North
14. 1980-07-20 Wonderful Comrades
15. 1980-07-27 Weird! Phantom Princess Ginebia
16. 1980-08-03 The Dragon that Spurts out Fire and the Youth
17. 1980-08-10 The Black-Horsed Knight who is Shrouded in Mystery
18. 1980-08-17 The Shining Fairy Rainbow
19. 1980-08-24 Appearance of the Phantom Mermaid
20. 1980-09-07 Spirit of the Tragic Snow Queen
21. 1980-09-14 Heated Battle! The Last Heir
22. 1980-09-21 Prince Arthur's Victory
