= Kazuyo Aoki =

Japanese actress (born 1947)

- 青木 和代
- Born: August 27, 1947 (age 79); Tokyo, Japan
- Occupations: Actress; voice actress
- Years active: 1969–present
- Agent: Kiraboshi

Kazuyo Aoki (青木 和代, Aoki Kazuyo; born August 27, 1947) is a Japanese actress and voice actress. She is employed by the talent management firm Kiraboshi.

== Biography ==
Born on August 27, 1947 in Tokyo, Japan, Aoki graduated from the Kojimachi Gakuen Girls' Senior High School.

She joined the Butai Geijyutsu Gakuin in 1969 and made her debut in Daikon no Hana. A fifth generation member of the NLT Theatre Company, Aoki was formerly affiliated with Gekidan NLT and Grue (formerly known as Production M-Three).

As a voice actress, Aoki is best known for portraying mother roles and middle-aged women roles, but also portrays young boy roles. She is particularly known for her portrayals of boisterous, somewhat rough-around-the-edges middle-aged women and chubby young boys.

She has an older sister, a younger brother, and a pet cat.

== Filmography ==
=== Feature films ===
- The Love Suicides at Sonezaki (1978) – Ladle
- Summer's Departure (1981) – Asakura Villa Maid
- Tears Bridge (1983) – Tango Shop
- Pickpocket (2000) – Danshukai Member
- A Boy's Summer in 1945 (2003) – Haru's mother
- Walking with the Dog: Chirori and Tamura (2004) – Landlord

=== Television animation ===
- Dog of Flanders (1975) – Children
- Robokko Beeton (1976) – Women
- Attack on Tomorrow! (1977) – Tomiko Ōta
- Haikara-San: Here Comes Miss Modern (1978) – Former Maid
- Future Boy Conan (1978) – Jimsy
- Anne of Green Gables (1979) – Charlie Sloane
- New Star of the Giants II (1979) – Additional voice
- Doraemon (1979–2005) – Mrs. Gōda, Jaiko Gōda (second voice)
- Maegami Tarō (1979) – Ox Demon
- Future Robot Daltanious (1979) – Shōbō
- The Monster Kid (1980) – Additional voice
- Misha the Little Bear (1980) – Kunta
- The Adventures of Tom Sawyer (1980) – Huckleberry Finn (Huck)
- The Littl' Bits (1980) – Boy
- Lupin the 3rd Part II (1980) – Additional voice
- Queen Millennia (1981) – Haiji's mother
- The Gutsy Frog (1981) – Additional voice
- Beast King GoLion (1981) – Hisu/Nanny
- Miss Machiko (1981) – Takeo
- Belle and Sebastion (1981) – Additional voice
- Hello! Spank (1982) – Additional voice
- Gyakuten! Ippatsuman (1982) – Seiko
- Game Center Arashi (1982) – Nurse (Ep. 7)
- Tonde Mon Pe (1982) – Nurse
- Ninja Hattori-kun (1982) – Yukikō's mother
- Fuku-chan (1982) – Ganta
- Pro Golfer Saru TV Special (1982) – Daimaru
- Love Me, My Knight (1983) – Mother
- Nanako SOS (1983) – Mother (Ep. 8)
- Georgie! (1983) – Victor
- Story of the Alps: My Annette (1983) – Jean
- Bismark (1984) – Mrs. Graham, Marlo
- Soya Monogatari (1984) – Hostess
- Mīmu Iro Iro Yume no Tabi (1984) – Takeshi
- Ranpō (1984) – Landlady, Hana Aoba, Torako Goriyama
- Onegai! Samia-don (1985) – Robert
- Oyoneko Bunyan (1985) – Cat Thief
- High School! Kimengumi (1985) – Tsuya Kaibu
- Musashi no Ken (1985) – Kaji
- Sherlock Hound (1985) – Malta (Ep. 25)
- Ozu no Mahōtsukai (1986) – Jack Pumpkinhead
- Mobile Suit Gundam ZZ (1986) – Anma
- GeGeGe no Kitarō (1986) – Akiyama, Red Bean Granny, Cackling Woman
- Bug tte Honey (1986) – Additional voice
- Maison Ikkoku (1986) – Hanae Ichinose
- Ultra B (1987) – Dota
- The Story of Fifteen Boys (1987) – Service
- Mami the Psychic (1988) – Hiro
- Grimm's Fairy Tale Classics (1988) – Cat
- Tsuide ni Tonchinkan (1988) – My Mom the Plague
- Obocchama-kun (1989) – Fukurokoji Kanemitsu
- Mister Ajikko (1989) – Okara
- The Laughing Salesman (1989) – Additional voice
- Obatarian (1990) – Hiroe
- Kariage-kun (1990) – Proprietress, Shizuka Himekawa
- Chimpui (1990) – Muuya
- It's Tsuruhime! (1990) – Ine-san
- Magical Taruruto (1990) – Jabao's mother
- Anime Himitsu no Hanazono (1991) – Susan Sowerby
- Let's Go! Anpanman (1991) – Mit-kun
- Free Kick Toward Tomorrow (1992) – Tomiko Ōta
- Cooking Papa (1994) – Dr. Makita
- The Legend of Zorro (1996) – Gonzalez's mother
- Manmaru The Ninja Penguin (1997) – Tanutarou's mother
- Fruits Basket (2001) – Mother of Minagawa Motoko
- Hanada Shōnen Shi (2002) – Tatsu Yanagihara
- Atashin'chi (2006) – Aunt
- Great Detective Conan (2006) – Market Village, Tamami Mitsui
- Stitch! (2010) – Jumba's ex-wife
- Crayon Shin-chan (2011) – Gen-sen
- Sazae-san (2013) – Housewife, Wife, Iwanami's wife
- My Love Story!! (2015) – Yuriko Gōda
- Mysterious Joker (2015) – Bandit Leader
- Kuma Miko: Girl Meets Bear (2016) – Tokuyama
- Peter Grill and the Philosopher's Time (2022) – The Queen

=== Tokusatsu ===
- Mysterious Girl Nile Thutmose (1991) – Love Demon (Ep. 46)
- Gekisou Sentai Carranger (1996) – AAAbanba (Ep. 21)

=== Theatrical animation ===
- Future Boy Conan (1979) – Jimsy
- Doraemon: Nobita's Dinosaur (1980) – Mrs. Gōda
- Makoto-chan (1980) – Worker
- Urusei Yatsura: Only You (1983) – Oni Commander
- Doraemon: Nobita and the Castle of the Undersea Devil (1983) – Mrs. Gōda
- Doraemon: Nobita's Great Adventure into the Underworld (1984) – Mrs. Gōda
- Papa Mama Bye-Bye (1984) – Shinpachi
- Future Boy Conan: The Big Giant Robot's Resurrection (1984) – Jimsy
- Doraemon: Nobita and the Steel Troops (1986) – Mrs. Gōda
- Doraemon: Nobita and the Knights on Dinosaurs (1987) – Mrs. Gōda
- Maison Ikkoku: The Final Chapter (1988) – Hanae Ichinose
- Doraemon: Nobita and the Birth of Japan (1989) – Mrs. Gōda
- Chibi Maruko-chan (1990) – Bootarō Tomita
- Dorami-chan: Wow, The Kid Gang of Bandits! (1991) – Takezō's mother
- Doraemon: Nobita and the Spiral City (1997) – Panda
- Doraemon Comes Back (1998) – Mrs. Gōda
- Good Luck! Gian!! (2001) – Jaiko Gōda, Mrs. Gōda
- The Day When I Was Born (2002) – Mrs. Gōda
- Doraemon: Nobita and the Windmasters (2003) – Mrs. Gōda
- Doraemon: Nobita in the Wan-Nyan Spacetime Odyssey (2004) – Mrs. Gōda

=== Original video animation (OVA) ===
- Maison Ikkoku: Through the Passing Seasons (1988) – Hanae Ichinose
- Shiawase no Katachi (1990) – Muki-chan, Narration 2, Shimo-mama
- Maison Ikkoku: Shipwrecked on Ikkoku Island (1991) – Hanae Ichinose
- Kero Kero Keroppi no Ganbare! Keroppiiz (1994) – Don Don

=== Video games ===
- Future Boy Conan (1992) – Jimsy
- Linda Cube (1995) – Meme
- The Kindaichi Case Files: Hell Park Murder Case (1998) – Haru Satō
- GeGeGe no Kitarō: Ibun Yōkaitan (2003) – Additional voice
- Fossil Monster Spectrobes (2010) – Gretta
- LittleBigPlanet 2 (2011) – The Negativitron
- E.X. Troopers (2012) – Sophie

=== Dubbing ===
==== Western films ====
- Gone with the Wind (1939) – Mammy (Hattie McDaniel) (Softcover version)
- The Philadelphia Experiment (1984)
- Crocodile Dundee (1986) – Aida (Maggie Blinco) (Fuji TV version)
- Dragnet (1987) – Enid Blyton (Kathleen Freeman) (TV Asahi version)
- The Mask (1994) – Agnes Peenman (Nancy Fish) (Nippon Television version)
- Waking Ned (1998) – Lizzy Quinn (Eileen Dromey)
- Percy Jackson: Sea of Monsters (2013) – Anger (Yvette Nicole Brown)

==== Western animation ====
- Atlantis: Milo's Return (2003) – Wilhelmina Bertha Packard (Florence Stanley)
- Luca (2021) – Grandma Paguro (Sandy Martin)
- Tiny Toon Adventures (1990) – Grandma "Nana" Bunny (Tress MacNeille)
- Babar (1989) – Winifred (Elizabeth Hanna) (season 3 episode 4)
- The Snowy Day (2016) – Peter's grandmother (Angela Bassett)
- The Boss Baby: Back in Business (2020) – Midge Marksberry (Brenda Vaccaro)
