= Noozles =

Japanese anime television series

- ふしぎなコアラ ブリンキー
- Genre: Coming of age, Adventure, Comedy-Drama
- Directed by: Noboru Ishiguro
- Music by: Reijirō Koroku
- Country of origin: Japan
- Original language: Japanese
- No. of episodes: 26

Production
- Executive producer: Koichi Motohashi
- Producers: Shigeo Endo; Eiko Tanaka
- Production companies: Nippon Animation; Fuji Television

Original release
- Network: FNS (Fuji TV)
- Release: July 7 – December 28, 1984

Noozles, also known as The Wondrous Koala Blinky (ふしぎなコアラ ブリンキー, Fushigina Koara Burinkī), is a 26-episode anime by Nippon Animation Company that was originally released in Japan in 1984. It depicts the adventures of a 12-year-old girl named Sandy and her koala friends, Blinky and Pinky, who are from the extra-dimensional realm of Koalawalla Land.

Noozles aired in Japan on Fuji TV in Tokyo and affiliated stations in its original run from July to December 1984. An edited, dubbed version produced by Saban Entertainment later aired in the United States on Nickelodeon as part of its Nick Jr. block from November 1988 to April 1993. The show usually aired at 1 P.M. on the weekdays, immediately following another koala-themed anime, Adventures of the Little Koala, and in the UK on BBC-owned channels and later on The Children's Channel.

The series has also been dubbed into French (under the title Les Koalous), Korean, Spanish (under the title Sandy y sus koalas), Arabic and German.

The series features episode direction by Noboru Ishiguro, best known for his work on the sci-fi anime series Space Battleship Yamato (Star Blazers) and the original Macross series (which became part of Robotech in North America) and layout work by Yasuji Mori. Mori also worked on the series' original character designs with Shuichi Seki, but the final designs were done by Isamu Kumata.

== Plot ==
One day, 12-year-old Sandy Brown receives a package from her long-lost grandfather containing a stuffed Koala named Blinky that was lost in a shipwreck 38 years ago. Sandy gives the koala a Noozle and it revives him from "magic sleepytime". His first word is "Blinky!!" in response to Sandy thinking out loud what she should name the bear right before she awakens him. They are soon joined by Blinky's sister Pinky, who appears out of thin air soon after Blinky is awakened, and demands immediately that Blinky returns with her to KoalaWalla Land. Blinky refuses however, and the trio go on to have many adventures together. Blinky is able to sustain himself while living on Earth with Sandy because of the Eucalyptus trees that Sandy's grandmother had planted 38 years ago when Sandy's grandfather, an archaeologist who had mysteriously disappeared while on an expedition to Ayers Rock, just before the ship was lost, told her that he was sending a Koala as a gift, as Sandy's grandmother had expressed that she had always wanted one as a pet.

It takes Sandy some time to determine that the "noozle" is the action that revives Blinky from magic sleepytime. She does this several times without thinking about it, and gets frustrated over the fact that Blinky falls asleep repeatedly (during which time his appearance is similar to that of an ordinary stuffed animal) and stubbornly refuses to awaken until she realizes what she must do to revive him. Early in the series, Sandy decides to introduce Blinky and Pinky to her grandmother, but decides to keep them a secret to everyone else.

About halfway through the series, Blinky and Pinky bring Sandy to their homeworld of KoalaWalla Land. KoalaWalla Land is a parallel dimension inhabited by anthropomorphic koalas, kangaroos, platypuses, cassowaries, kiwi, and frill-necked lizards. It is ruled by a wise old koala known as the High Dingy Doo. Humans aren't allowed in KoalaWalla Land (and in fact a human will be arrested and jailed on sight just for being in KoalaWalla Land), so Sandy has to wear a koala mask during each visit (though some are able to see through her poor disguise). A portal to KoalaWalla Land can be found at Ayers Rock. Pinkie also has the ability to create instant portals to KoalaWalla Land at any point, as well as portals back and forth through time, by utilizing the red lipstick in her magic cosmetic kit to draw an interdimensional hole in the time-space continuum.

Meanwhile, Sandy's father Alex, who is also an archaeologist like his father before him, is exploring Ayers Rock and trying to solve the mystery of what happened to his father 38 years ago. While there, he discovers a cave, and on the wall of the cave is a message that his father wrote 38 years ago, saying "I must leave on a mission of great importance. The little koala will know where I'll be." Alex stumbles into the portal to KoalaWalla Land at the end of the tunnel, where he is chased by the KoalaWalla Land police. Sandy, Blinky, and Pinky travel to KoalaWalla Land to rescue him. Alex stumbles upon a crystal planetoid in KoalaWalla Land, where he sees a shadowy figure resembling his father in one of the crystals. There, the KoalaWalla Land police find him and place him under a sleeping spell, but Sandy and Blinky and Pinky arrive to rescue him. They bring him back to Ayers Rock. Alex wakes up, convinced that the entire experience was a dream.

When Sandy hears that her father saw her grandfather, she and Blinky and Pinky decide to go back to KoalaWalla Land to look for him. They decide to look in The Crystal Place, which is connected to the crystal planetoid where Alex saw his father. The Crystal Place, which lies at the very core of KoalaWalla Land and helps hold the universe together, is a giant crystalline sphere filled with brightly colored orbs, which when touched by bare hands immediately entrap that person's essence forever with no escape. Sandy, protected by Pinky's magic bubble, enters The Crystal Place, and finds the spirit of her grandfather imprisoned in one of the orbs, trapped in a limbo-like state. He tells her to learn from the creatures of KoalaWalla Land and to understand how their community has come to survive in a world of love and companionship. Finally, he delivers the cryptic message "as the world of KoalaWalla Land goes, so goes the world of mankind." Sandy wants to know what he means, but that's all he can tell her, and he tells her that more will be revealed in due time.

Some time later, Alex is exploring Africa. He is scheduled to return home, but when he hears the story of a magic stone called the "wiseman stone", he decides to stay in Africa to search for it. Sandy and her mother are disappointed when they hear that Alex is staying in Africa, so Blinky and Pinky travel there to try to find a way to convince him to come home. They attempt to scare him back home by making ghost noises, and even create illusionary dinosaurs in an attempt to scare him away from the dig site, but nothing seems to work. Finally, Sandy's grandmother appears. She has traveled to Africa to scold her son for running off to look for the wiseman stone when his wife and daughter are waiting for him to come home. Alex decides to come back home with his mother. Shortly after arriving back home, Alex receives a phone call from his assistant Lionel who says that his team has found what they believe to be the Wiseman Stone, but they need Alex to check if it's the real deal since he's the expert on the subject. Later, during a visit to Sandy's grandmothers house, Blinky uses his magic powers to teleport an unknowing Alex to Africa. Confused as to how he got there, Alex checks the stone and confirms that it's authentic. Alex still has the stone with him when Blinky transports him back. Alex is still confused about the whole thing. When he shows the stone to his mother, she tells him that he must have found the stone in her attic, and that it is a stone that his father had found many years ago. After Sandy and her Parents have gone home, her grandmother brings the stone up to her attic, and it is revealed that there are two wiseman stones, one that Alex found in Africa, and another that his father had found years before.

One day, during another trip to Sandy's grandmother's house, Alex finds the two Wiseman stones in her attic. Alex is confused as to why there is now a second wiseman stone. His mother tells him that his father found one, and that he put the other one there when he came back from Africa. It is then that Sandy decides to tell her parents the truth about Blinky and Pinky. Shortly afterward, they receive a surprise visit from the High Dingy Doo, who has come to ask Alex a very important favor. The High Dingy explains that KoallaWalla Land and the Earth are destined to one day separate from each other naturally. However, because of seismic testing in the Australian Outback, the inter-dimensional axis that binds the two worlds together has become severely weakened, speeding up the process so much that both worlds could be destroyed in the separation. The High Dingy Doo also explains that Sandy's grandfather knew that this would happen someday due to his research of ancient Australian folklore. He entered The Crystal Place and became trapped there while trying to unravel the secrets of KoalaWalla Land. The High Dingy Doo says that Sandy's grandfather likely knows how to save the worlds from destruction, but that his spirit can only communicate with someone who is related to him by blood. The High Dingy Doo asks Alex to come to The Crystal Place so he can speak to his father's Spirit. Alex, protected by a magic bubble created by the High Dingy Doo, enters The Crystal Place and tells his father's spirit of the impending disaster. His father tells him that the only way to restore the balance between the two worlds so they can separate safely is to give the wiseman stones to Blinky, who will know what to do from there. After returning to earth, Alex gives the wiseman stones to Blinky, who now remembers what it is that he must do. Blinky teleports himself, Pinky, Sandy, her parents, and her grandmother to Ayers Rock, where the separation has already begun. Blinky and Pinky bring the stones to the top of Ayers Rock and place them in a predisposed altar, where Blinky manipulates them in a joystick-like fashion to keep the two worlds from destroying each other. Blinky and Pinky return to KoalaWalla Land in the process. Because the two worlds now exist as completely separate dimensions, Pinky's magic is no longer able to bridge the ties that formerly bound them, meaning Blinky and Pinky must now forever remain in their home separate from Earth.

== Historical background ==
Noozles was made as Japan was in the midst of a koala frenzy along with another koala themed anime titled コアラボーイコッキィ (Koala Boy Kokki), which would later be broadcast alongside Noozles on Nickelodeon's Nick Jr. block in 1988, under the English title Adventures of the Little Koala. According to The Anime Encyclopedia by Jonathan Clements and Helen McCarthy, Japan's koala frenzy was sparked by the Tama Zoo in western Tokyo receiving their first koala as the Australian government sent six koalas to Japan as a token of goodwill, but in actuality, the Tama Zoo as well as other zoos in Japan got their koalas because Japan was craving them.

Noozles aired on Fuji TV in the Kanto region of Japan Saturday nights at 8pm from July through September 1984, then moved to Fridays at 7pm for the remainder of the series run. Some other stations in the Fuji network system, namely Hokkaido Cultural Broadcasting, TV Shizuoka, Fukui TV, Tokai TV, Okayama Broadcasting and San-in Chūō Television Broadcasting, aired the series in the same time slots as the producing station; other stations in the chain aired it on a delayed basis.

== Characters ==
Character	Original Japanese voice	English dubbing voice	Role in storyline
Sandy Brown	Arisa Andō	Heidi Lenhart	The main female human protagonist of the series.
Blinky	Keiko Toda	Brianne Siddall	The second protagonist of the series, as well as the owner of the Watch that stops time.
Printy (Pinky in English)	Masako Miura	Cheryl Chase (episodes 1-9), Lara Cody (episodes 10-26)	Blinky's little sister, who keeps trying to convince him to come home to Koalawalla Land.
Grandma Brown	Chie Kitagawa	Edie Mirman	Sandy's grandmother, who is the only one besides Sandy, herself, that is aware of Blinky and Pinky being alive.
Professor Alex Brown	Akio Nojima	Tom Wyner	Sandy's father, who travels.
Kelly Brown	Tomoko Munakata	Mari Devon	Sandy's mother, who is an interviewer.
Mark	TARAKO	N/A	Sandy's best friend and classmate, who teases her sometimes, but has a secret crush on her.
Osgood	Akio Nojima	Jeff Winkless	A Frill-necked Lizard, who often appears for no reason as a running gag.
High Dingy Doo	Hiroshi Ōtake	Ted Lehmann	A wise old koala who is the de facto authority of Koalawalla Land.
Poe (Frankie in English)	Issei Futamata	Dave Mallow	A thug who wants to steal Blinky.
Drow (Spike in English)	Naoki Tatsuta	Jeff Winkless	Frankie's partner in crime.
Benjamin Brown	Takurō Kitagawa	Dave Mallow	Sandy's grandfather who disappeared.
Mark's mother	Naoko Haneda	Edie Mirman	The owner of the local flower shop.
Mr. Malisse	Ikuya Sawaki	Doug Lee (episode 3), Dave Mallow	Sandy's teacher.
Emily	Run Sasaki	Lara Cody	Sandy's friend.
Olivia	Kumiko Mizukura	Mari Devon	Sandy's rival at school

== Episode list ==
English episode titles are given first followed by the Japanese episode title in parentheses and the episode's air date in Japan.

1. A Friend From Down Under (奇妙な友情 Kimyōna yūjō, "A Strange Friendship") - 7 July 1984
2. Granny Meets Blinky And Pinky (宇宙人!? Uchuujin!?, "An Alien!?") - 14 July 1984
3. Sandy's Birthday Surprise (消えたパパ Kieta Papa, "Papa Disappeared") - 21 July 1984
4. She Loves Me Not (ライバル出現 Raibaru shutsugen, "A Rival Appears") - 28 July 1984
5. Sandy's Three Wishes (三つのお願い Mittsu no onegai, "Three Wishes") - 4 August 1984
6. Sandy's Stardom (大冒険! Dai bōken!, "Great Adventure!") - 11 August 1984
7. To Catch Smoky And Louis (大追跡 Dai tsuiseki, "The Great Chase") - 18 August 1984
8. The Art Contest (幻の絵 Maboroshi no e, "The Phantom Picture") - 25 August 1984
9. Like Father, Like Daughter (わたしは美人 Watashi wa bijin, "I'm Beautiful") - 1 September 1984
10. Naughty But Nice (こまった親切 Komatta shinsetsu, "The Trouble with Being Nice") - 8 September 1984
11. That Ol' Pink Magic (ぼく強い子 Boku tsuyoiko, "My Strong Child") - 15 September 1984
12. Going Back In Time (過去への旅 Kako e no tabi, "Journey to the Past") - 22 September 1984
13. Humans Not Allowed (異空間の国 Ikūkan no kuni, "A Land in an Alternate Dimension") - 29 September 1984
14. The Last Caper (逃げろ大泥棒 Nigero dai dorobō, "The Thief's Great Escape") - 5 October 1984
15. Koalawalla Land (なぞナゾ謎! Nazo nazo nazo!, "Mystery, Mystery, Mystery!") - 12 October 1984
16. The Mysterious Message (再び異次元へ Futatabi ijigen e, "Return to the Other Dimension") - 19 October 1984
17. Commander Blinky (友情の輪ッ Yūjō no wa ~tsu, "The Friendship Ring") - 26 October 1984
18. Cinderella Sandy (ガラスのくつ Garasu no kutsu, "The Glass Slippers") - 2 November 1984
19. Star Struck (たのしい休日 Tanoshī kyūjitsu, "Fun Day Off") - 9 November 1984
20. The Magical Vacations (賢者の石 Kenja no ishi, "The Philosopher's Stone") - 16 November 1984
21. Sandy Runs Away From Home (家出 Iede, "Running Away from Home") - 23 November 1984
22. Travelling Back In Time (プロポーズ Puropōzu, "Propose") - 30 November 1984
23. The Magic Show (S.O.S.) - 7 December 1984
24. Play Acting (私が主役 Watashi ga shuyaku, "I'm the Lead") - 14 December 1984
25. Ayers Rock (大異変 Dai ihen, "Major Catastrophe") - 21 December 1984
26. How It All Began (思い出の日々 Omoide no hibi, "Memorable Days") - 28 December 1984

== Credits ==
Production company
Nippon Animation Company Ltd.
Original broadcaster
Fuji TV
Japanese distribution
Fuji Eight Company Ltd.
American distribution
Saban International Services
Written by
Nobuyuki Isshiki (5-6, 9-11, 15, 22), Taku Sugiyama (1-2, 13, 18, 25-26), Akira Nakano (7, 16, 19, 23), Keiko Mukuroji (2-4, 8, 12, 17, 20, 24), Mitsuru Tanabe (14), Yasufumi Yoda (21)
Series Director
Taku Sugiyama
Episode Directors
Kenji Miyashita (21, 24), Mitsuru Tanabe (14), Noboru Ishiguro (4, 12, 16), Taku Sugiyama (1-3, 5-11, 13, 15, 17–20, 22–23, 25-26)
Character Design
Isamu Kumata
Storyboards
Eiji Okabe (14, 15, 17, 19, 20, 23), Eimi Maeda (24), Fumio Kurokawa (13), Katsumi Endō (2, 5, 8, 10), Kazuyoshi Katayama (9), Masayuki Hayashi (7), Noboru Ishiguro (4, 12, 16, 21), Taku Sugiyama (1, 6, 11, 18, 22, 25, 26)
Animation Director
Hidemi Maeda (1, 5, 7, 11, 13, 15, 18–19, 22, 24, 26), Masami Abe (3, 9, 17, 20, 25), Takao Ogawa (2, 6, 8, 10, 12, 14, 16, 21, 23), Kiyotoshi Aoi (4)
Art Director
Masamichi Takano
Artboards
Gōichi Kudō
Layout Supervisor
Yasuji Mori
Director of Photography
Toshiaki Morita (Trans Arts)
Editing
Takeshi Seyama, Yoshihiro Kasahara, Hidetoshi Kadoono
Sound Director
Hideyuki Tanaka
Original Music
Reijirō Kōroku (U.S. version: Haim Saban and Shuki Levy)
Executive Producer
Kōichi Motohashi
Producers
Shigeo Endō, Eiko Tanaka
Production Manager
Junzō Nakajima
Planning
Shōji Satō

== Music ==
Opening Theme
"Fushigi Ufufu" by Tarako
Ending Theme
"Shabadaba Dakedo" by Toshio Furukawa

== Merchandise ==
=== Books ===
- Noozles: New Friends (1993 Tor Books; L. Spencer Humphrey & Deborah Morse)

=== Videos ===
Released from 1991–1994 by Celebrity Home Entertainment

- Adventures in Koalawalla Land (120 min.)
- Blinky and Pinky's Excellent Adventure (95 min.)
- A Day With Grandma (30 min.)
- Fuzzy Was a Noozle (95 min.)
- Koala Bear Magic (75 min.)
- A New Friend (30 min.)
- Nuzzling With the Noozles (110 min.)
- Picture Perfect (30 min.)
- Blinky's Decision / The Last Caper (50 min.)

== See also ==
- Blinky Bill
- Adventures of the Little Koala

== Bibliography ==
- The Encyclopedia of Animated Cartoons, 2nd ed.
- The Anime Encyclopedia - A Guide to Japanese Animation Since 1917 by Jonathan Clements and Helen McCarthy
