= Urikupen Kyūjotai =

Japanese anime television series

- ウリクペン救助隊
- Created by: Mitsuru Kaneko
- Written by: Jinzō Toriumi
- Directed by: Hiroshi Sasagawa; Seitaro Hara
- Music by: Shunsuke Kikuchi
- Opening theme: "Ganbare! Urikupen Kyūjotai" by Ichirou Mizuki
- Country of origin: Japan
- Original language: Japanese
- No. of episodes: 132

Production
- Producer: Masatsugu Nagai
- Production companies: Unimax & MK; Tatsunoko Production

Original release
- Network: FNS (Fuji TV)
- Release: September 30, 1974 – March 29, 1975

Urikupen Kyūjotai (ウリクペン救助隊, Urikupen Kyūjotai; Urikupen Rescue Team) is a 1974 short anime television series produced by Tatsunoko Production and directed by Hiroshi Sasagawa. The series premiered on Fuji Television on September 30, 1974, and ended on March 29, 1975.

Much later in 1991, Saban Entertainment has licensed and adapted the anime series for a worldwide release outside of Japan under the name, Jungle Tales and has condensed the 132 5-minute (serialized) episodes into 22 half-hour episodes. The voice casting and the English language dubbing production was done in-house by CINAR Studios, Inc. in Montreal, Canada. It has been broadcast on YTV in Canada. Heavy changes were made to the adaptation dub of the series. One being such is a new music score that was all digitally composed and sampled with an E-mu Proteus 2 Orchestra synthesizer. Other changes involve different character names used and gender changes for two characters. At the end of each condensed episode, a 3-minute music video was added to summarize the episode's plot. Many foreign dubs of the anime series would be mere translations of the dub.

== Plot ==
Set in the country of Urikupen kingdom, a rescue team consisting of animals goes onto missions to rescue forest animals in disastrous locations. A mobilization scenario is shown once a week stating "this week's Lifetime Achievement Award" which is given to the rescue workers.

== Characters ==
| Character Name(s) | Japanese / English Voice Actor |
|---|---|
| Boss Lion (ライオンのボス Raion no Bosu) / King Leo | Unknown / Aron Tager |
| Narrator (ナレーション Narēshon) | Rokurō Naya / Patricia Rodriguez |
| Seitaro Usagi (ウサギの征太郎 Usagi no Seitarō) / Rhonda Rabbit | Michie Kita / Sonja Ball |
| Gindai Pengin (ペンギンのギン太 Pengin no Gindai) / Pete Penguin | Tetsuo Mizutori / Rick Jones |
| Hachigorō Kuma (クマの八五郎 Kuma no Hachigorō) / Barney Bear | Shōji Satō / Gary Jewell |
| Rinrin Tsuru (ツルのリンリン Tsuru no Rinrin) / Petula Pigeon | Yōko Asagami / Jane Woods |
| Chocho Inoshishi (イノシシのチョチョ Inoshishi no Chocho) / Harry Hog | Unknown / Terrence Scammell |
| Mu Tonakai (トナカイのムーさん Tonakai no Mu-san) / Donny Dear | Unknown / Michael O'Reilly |
| Pinsuke Ritsu (ペンギンのギン太 Ritsu no Pinsuke) / Scooter Squirrel | Unknown / Rick Jones |
| Koara (コアラ Koara) / Koko Koala | Unknown / Sonja Ball |
| Wolf (ハングルフ Hangurufu) / Wolf Bain | Tetsuo Mizutori / Terrence Scammell |
| Condor (コンドル Kondoru) / Vic the Vulture | Unknown / Gary Jewell |
| Crow (カラス Karasu) / Jo-Jo Crow | Unknown / Terrence Scammell |

== Release ==
The series was produced by Tatsunoko Production and directed by Hiroshi Sasagawa. The anime has been licensed by Saban Entertainment in North America.

The opening theme is "Ganbare! Urikupen Kyūjotai" by Ichirou Mizuki and Columbia Yurokago Kai.
