= James Dean: The First American Teenager =

- Directed by: Ray Connolly
- Starring: James Dean; Dennis Hopper; Leonard Rosenman; Carroll Baker; Sammy Davis Jr. Natalie Wood; Sal Mineo
- Narrated by: Stacy Keach
- Production company: ZIV International
- Distributed by: British Lion Films
- Release date: 1976
- Country: United States
- Language: English
- Budget: £99,558
- Box office: £148,618

James Dean: The First American Teenager is a 1976 American documentary film about actor James Dean featuring interviews with many of Dean's friends and co-stars.

The film was produced by ZIV International and distributed by British Lion Films.
