= Mark Mercury =

American composer

Mark Gibbons
- Genres: Space music; Electronic music; Electroacoustic music; Ambient music; Film score; Art music
- Occupation: Composer
- Years active: Late-1970’s — Present
- Website: www.markmercury.com

Mark Gibbons, better known as Mark Mercury, is an American composer. He has arranged, produced, recorded, and composed music since the 1970s.

== Career ==
Mercury is an American composer whose music falls into several genres: space, electronic, electro-acoustic, ambient, cinematic, and contemporary classical/serious music. Using orchestral timbres and futuristic electronic sounds, Mark creates soundscapes, albums, and scores for modern dance, ballet, film, video, and high-tech planetariums.

In 1988 Mercury began creating planetarium soundtracks and by 2011 had scored 38 shows. His first album, "Music of the Domes" (1992), contained excerpts from his planetarium soundtracks. Staying in the space music vein, Mercury created all new recordings for his second album, "The Art of Space" (1997), which featured five space poems written by professional poets, recited by actors, and underscored with music. His third album, "Music from Cycles of Spheres" (2002), consisted of three suites drawn from his planetarium scores. The music is part of the touring art exhibition "Cycles of Spheres: Mapping the Planets in Silk and Sound", featuring the silk batiks of artist Mary Edna Fraser.

In recent years Mercury has worked to a large extent on composing music for modern dance and ballet. His music can be heard in such works as Francisco Martinez Dancetheatre's "Orbital Dances" and The Ballet Collective's "Spaces Between" and "Dawn to Dusk".

In his early school years Mercury studied classical piano, jazz, blues, and arranging. He began his professional music career in the late 1970s in Hollywood working as a songwriter, studio musician, record arranger and producer. In 1979 and 1981 he co-founded two music production companies, Bullets and California Star Music, through which he and his partners wrote songs, produced records, and composed and produced the music for animated series, animated features, television programs, videos, and commercials.

Mercury's musical output prior to 1988 was in a variety of styles, tailored to the currents in the music and entertainment industries. With his entrance into the world of planetarium scores, Mercury's musical style became more focused and began its evolution into what it is today. His album releases are under his own record label Blue Chromium Records.

== Works ==
- Candy Candy (1976)
- Little Lulu and Her Little Friends (1976)
- Space Pirate Captain Harlock (1978)
- Captain Future (1979)
- Hana no Ko Lunlun (1979)
- King Arthur and the Knights of the Round Table (1979)
- Serendipity the Pink Dragon (1983)
