= Junko Asami =

Japanese actress and singer

- 麻見 順子
- Born: September 24, 1967 (age 58); Kanagawa Prefecture
- Occupations: Actress; voice actress; singer
- Years active: 1988–present
- Agent: Project Paan

Junko Asami (Japanese: 麻見 順子, born September 24, 1967) is a Japanese voice actress and narrator from Kanagawa Prefecture. She is currently affiliated with Project Paan, a talent agency located in Saitama.

Asami is best known for her work as; Sayoko Mishima, a supporting character from the anime Ah! My Goddess; Guinevere De Britannia, a minor antagonist from Code Geass, Rebecca from Pokemon, Freya from Mythical Detective Loki Ragnarok, and Ruri Hadou from Demonbane.

== Filmography ==
=== Animation ===
Year	Title	Role	Source
1988	Gunbuster (OVA)	Female Student A	
1989	Mobile Suit SD Gundam: SD Gundam Legend (OVA)	Prophet Sarasa	
1989	City Hunter 3	Girl (Ep. 6), Woman A (Ep. 10)	
1989	Dorami-chan: Mini Dora SOS!!! (Short film)	Yukari	
1990	Gude Crest: The Emblem of Gude (OVA)	Rubiella	
1990	Sin Karate Jigokuhen: Kessen no Kado (OVA)	Linda	
1990	1+2=Paradise (OVA)	Girl	
1990	NG Knight Ramune &40	Lila	
1990	The Three-Eyed One	Girl A (Ep. 8), Young Wife (Ep. 1)	
1991	Judge (OVA)	Keiko Yamamoto	
1991	Dragon Knight (OVA)	Leila	
1991	Shounen Ashibe	Anzai Sensei, Riko	
1991	Let's Go! Anpanman		
1991	Dorami-chan: Wow, The Kid Gang of Bandits! (Short film)	Handmaiden	
1992	Three Little Ghosts	Eri	
1992	Mikan Enikki	Chibitarou, Kyouko, Tachibana	
1992	Tekkaman Blade	Luis	
1993	Oh My Goddess! (OVA)	Sayoko Mishima, Store Girl	
1993	Nintama Rantaro		
1993	Rance: Sabaku no Guardian	Girl	
1994	Kiki to Lala no Habatake! Pegasus (OVA)	Star Child A	
1994	The Rapeman Anime Version (OVA)	Kazuo's lover	
1994	Ai to Yuuki no Pig Girl Tonde Buurin	Kaoru Hidaka	
1995	The Brave of Gold Goldran	Michiru (Ep. 1), Sharania Sheathluh	
1995	Wild Knights Gulkeeva	Sayaka	
1996	Battle Team Lakers EX (OVA)	Reiko, Star Laker	
1996	Jewel BEM Hunter Lime	Poogie	
1997	Pokémon	Manami (Rebecca)	
1998	Fortune Quest L	Trapp's Mother	
2003	Mythical Detective Loki Ragnarok	Freya	
2004	MONSTER	Boy's Mother	
2006	Demonbane	Ruri Hadou	
2008	Code Geass: Lelouch of the Rebellion R2	Guinevere de Britannia	
2011	Armored Trooper Votoms: Alone Again (OVA)	Monk B	
2018	Code Geass: Lelouch of the Rebellion III – Glorification	Guinevere de Britannia	
