= King Arthur (TV series) =

Japanese anime TV series

- Cover art of the 2004 limited edition soundtrack
- 円卓の騎士物語 燃えろアーサー
- Created by: Satomi Mikuriya
- Based on: Le Morte d'Arthur by Sir Thomas Mallory
- Directed by: Masayuki Akehi; Tomoharu Katsumata
- Music by: Shinichi Tanabe
- Country of origin: Japan
- Original language: Japanese
- No. of episodes: 30

Production
- Production companies: Toei Animation; Asatsu

Original release
- Network: FNS (Fuji TV)
- Release: 9 September 1979 – 3 March 1980

King Arthur and the Knights of the Round Table (円卓の騎士物語 燃えろアーサー, Entaku no Kishi Monogatari Moero Āsā; lit. Story of the Knights of the Round Table: Blazing Arthur) is a Japanese anime series based on Arthurian legend. Produced by Toei Animation, the series consists of 30 half-hour episodes released between September 9, 1979, and March 3, 1980. The series achieved great popularity in its non-English translations.

The series tells the story of King Arthur and the Knights of the Round Table, featuring 'Arthurian' characters such as Lancelot, Guinevere, Tristan, Percival, Merlin, Uther Pendragon, and Igraine and other familiar elements of Arthurian lore, including the castle Camelot and Arthurian relics such as Excalibur. The series is not entirely faithful to the original legends since it adds new characters and stories which make the plot less brutal. The second season had an even lighter tone.

== Plot ==
When Prince Arthur is a baby, his father, King Uther Pendragon, rules Camelot. Lavik, another king who wishes to conquer Camelot, attacks the castle. Arthur is saved by Merlin who sends him to a knight for safekeeping. For many years, this knight raises Arthur as his own son.

At the age of 15, Arthur attends a tournament with his foster father. At the tournament, he finds that he is able to pull the sword Excalibur from a stone. This action proves Arthur is the legitimate king of England. As a result, Arthur's foster father reveals the truth of his royal lineage. King Arthur and his subjects decide to fight against the evil King Lavik, who is aided by the witch Medessa.

== Characters ==
- Akira Kamiya as King Arthur
- Keiko Han as Guinevere
- Hideyuki Tanaka as Sir Kay
- Makio Inoue as Tristan
- Satomi Majima as Phine
- Michie Kita as Galahad
- Tesshō Genda as Lancelot
- Banjō Ginga as Rubik/Lavik
- Daisuke Gōri as Percival
- Kenji Utsumi as Gastar
- Ichirō Nagai as Sir Ector and Longinus
- Hidekatsu Shibata as Yuuzel
- Yasuo Hisamatsu as Merlin
- Akiko Tsuboi as Igraine
- Kohei Miyauchi as Archbishop
- Masato Ibu as Leodegrance
- Toshio Furukawa as Pellinore
- Hidekatsu Shibata as Uther

== Production and release ==
Title card for 1981 English dub version

Isao Sasaki and Koorogi '73 sang the opening theme "Kibou yo sore wa" and "Ou no Naka no Ou". The ending theme is performed by Mitsuko Horie and Koorogi '73.

In the early 1980s, a French-dubbed version, titled Le Roi Arthur, was released through Jacques Censtrier Productions. The first four episodes were released on VHS. In this version, all of the characters' names and the opening and closing theme songs were kept the same. An English dubbed version called King Arthur & the Knights of the Round Table was produced and distributed by ZIV International, Inc. in 1981.

=== Manga adaptation ===
The series was adapted into several comics published in Telebi Magazine (テレビマガジン), Terebi Land (テレビランド) and Bōken Ō. The Bōken Ō adaptation was created by Satomi Mikuriya (御厨さと美) and "Mic Mac Production". The series was followed by King Arthur: Prince on White Horse in 1980.

== List of episodes ==
List of episodes of King Arthur & the Knights of the Round Table
Episode	Airdate	Title	Screenplay by	Producer	Director	Art
1	9 September 1979	風雲児アーサー / "Arthur as a Child"	Mitsuru Mashima	Akira Makoto	Takao Noda	Tadashi Tsuji
2	16 September 1979	輝けキャメロットの星 / "Camelot the Star"	Mitsuru Mashima	Katsuji Kachimada	Yasuhiko Suzuki	Ito Ikko Ito
3	23 September 1979	湖の騎士・ランスロット / "Lancelot the Lake Knight"	Mitsuru Mashima	Ochiai Masamune	Kikuchi Shironi	Toshikazu Yamaguchi
4	30 September 1979	竪琴の騎士・トリスタン / "Tristan the Wolfe Knight"	Mitsuru Mashima	Kazumi Fukushima	Kikuchi Shironi	Toshikazu Yamaguchi
5	7 October 1979	勇気ある少年ガラハッド / "Galahad the Courageous Boy"	Mitsuru Mashima	Akira Makoto	Kikuchi Shironi	Ito Ikko Ito
6	14 October 1979	神剣エクスカリバー / "Excalibur"	Mitsuru Mashima	Takeki Kamiki	Kikuchi Shironi	Toshikazu Yamaguchi
7	21 October 1979	槍の名人パーシバル / "Master Percival of the Rose"	Mitsuru Mashima	Matsuura Keppairiru	Kikuchi Shironi	Tadashi Tsuji
8	28 October 1979	5人の若き騎士たち / "The Five Young Knights"	Mitsuru Mashima	Omachi Shigeru	Shinoda Ayama	Ito Ikko Ito
9	4 November 1979	黒い狐・ペリノア / "Pelinore the Black Fox"	Mitsuru Mashima	Kazumi Fukushima	Kikuchi Shironi	Ito Ikko Ito
10	11 November 1979	炎の中の王子 / "The Flaming Prince"	Akira Nakano	Ochiai Masamune	Kikuchi Shironi	Tadashi Tsuji
11	18 November 1979	花咲ける騎士道の丘 / "Blooming Chivalry Hill"	Mitsuru Mashima	Matsuura Keppairiru	Kikuchi Shironi	Tadashi Tsuji
12	25 November 1979	金髪の戦士・フィーネ / "Finn the Blonde Warrior"	Akira Nakano	Kazumi Fukushima	Takao Noda	Kenichi Harada
13	2 December 1979	暗黒魔女との闘い / "The Fight with the Dark Witch"	Mitsuru Mashima	Akira Makoto	Kikuchi Shironi	Ito Ikko Ito
14	9 December 1979	怒りの故里 前編 / "Hometown of Anger (1st Part)"	Mitsuru Mashima	Matsuura Keppairiru	Kikuchi Shironi	Tadashi Tsuji
15	16 December 1979	怒りの故里 後編 / "Hometown of Anger (2nd Part)"	Mitsuru Mashima	Kazumi Fukushima	Kikuchi Shironi	Tadashi Tsuji
16	23 December 1979	恐怖の槍試合 / "Dreadful Jousting Match"	Mitsuru Mashima	Omachi Shigeru	Kikuchi Shironi	Kenichi Harada
17	30 December 1979	地獄から来た呪いの剣士 / "The Cursed Swordsman from Hell"	Mitsuru Mashima	Akira Saori	Shinoda Ayama	Ito Ikko Ito
18	6 January 1980	激戦！この砦を守れ / "Fierce Battle! Protect the Fort"	Mitsuru Mashima	Kozo Morishita	Kikuchi Shironi	Kenichi Harada
19	13 January 1980	荒野に咲く花 / "Flowers Blooming in the Wilderness"	Mitsuru Mashima	Matsuura Keppairiru	Kikuchi Shironi	Ito Ikko Ito
20	20 January 1980	響け！父の足音 / "Resonate! Footsteps of the Father"	Mitsuru Mashima	Kazumi Fukushima	Kikuchi Shironi	Kenichi Harada
21	27 January 1980	赤い夕陽の五人 "Five People in the Red Sunset"	Mitsuru Mashima	Akira Saori	Takao Noda	Ito Ikko Ito
22	3 February 1980	魔女の城の謎 / "The Mystery of the Magic Castle"	Mitsuru Mashima	Omachi Shigeru	Kikuchi Shironi	Kenichi Harada
23	10 February 1980	アドラス山の怪獣 / "The Monster of Mount Adras"	Mitsuru Mashima	Matsuura Keppairiru	Noazuma Numajiri	Ito Ikko Ito
24	17 February 1980	聖なる楯はここに！ / "Here is the Sacred Shield!"	Mitsuru Mashima	Kozo Morishita	Kikuchi Shironi	Ito Ikko Ito
25	24 February 1980	魔女メデッサを倒せ！/ "Defeat the witch Medessa!"	Mitsuru Mashima	Kazumi Fukushima	Kikuchi Shironi	Kenichi Harada
26	2 March 1980	悪王ラヴィックの最期？/ "Is this the End of the Evil King Ravik?"	Mitsuru Mashima	Takeshi Kamiki	Shinoda Ayama	Kenichi Harada
27	9 March 1980	地獄からの使者 / "Messenger from Hell"	Ito Tsunhisa	Akira Saori	Takao Noda	Bunmei Uchikawa
28	16 March 1980	ドクロ騎士の正体 / "Skull Knight's True Identity"	Ito Tsunhisa	Kazumi Fukushima	Kikuchi Shironi	Kenichi Harada
29	23 March 1980	呪いの赤い雪 / "Curse of the Red Snow"	Ito Tsunhisa	Matsuura Keppairiru	Noazuma Numajiri	Hata Shun Qin
30	30 March 1980	激闘！最後のたたかい / "Fierce Battle! The Final Battle"	Mitsuru Mashima	Kozo Morishita	Kikuchi Shironi	Kenichi Harada
