= Fujiko Fujio =

Pen name of Japanese manga writing duo

- 藤子 不二雄
- Abiko (top) and Fujimoto (bottom)
- Born: Hiroshi Fujimoto (藤本 弘); Motoo Abiko (安孫子 素雄); Fujimoto: December 1, 1933 in Takaoka, Toyama, Empire of Japan; Abiko: March 10, 1934 in Himi, Toyama, Empire of Japan
- Died: Fujimoto: September 23, 1996 (aged 62) in Shinjuku, Tokyo, Japan; Abiko: April 6, 2022 (aged 88) in Kawasaki, Kanagawa, Japan
- Occupation: Manga artists
- Writing career
- Pen name: Fujiko Fujio (common, 1953–1988); Fujiko F. Fujio (Fujimoto, 1989–); Fujiko A. Fujio (Abiko, 1988–)
- Years active: 1951–1987 (Fujiko Fujio); 1988–2022 (Fujiko A. Fujio); 1989–1996 (Fujiko F. Fujio)
- Notable works: Obake no Q-Tarō; Ninja Hattori-kun; Kaibutsu-kun; Perman; Doraemon; Kiteretsu Daihyakka
- Notable awards: Shogakukan Manga Award (2 works in 1963, Doraemon in 1982); Tezuka Osamu Cultural Prize (Doraemon); Tezuka Osamu Cultural Prize Special Prize (Manga Michi etc.)

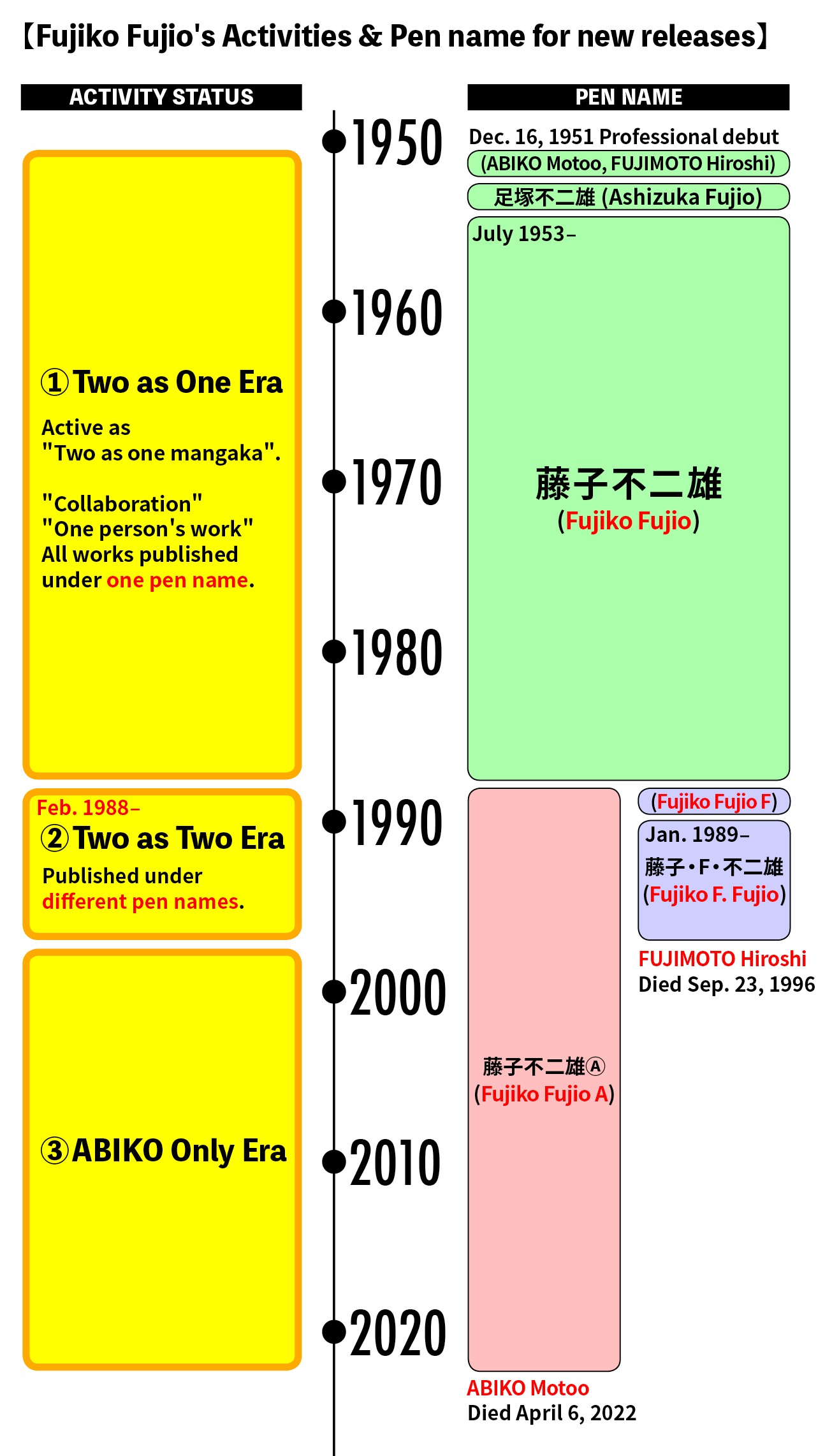
Fujiko Fujio's activities and pen names

Fujiko Fujio (藤子 不二雄) was a manga writing duo formed by Japanese manga artists Hiroshi Fujimoto (藤本 弘, Fujimoto Hiroshi; December 1, 1933 – September 23, 1996) and Motoo Abiko (安孫子 素雄, Abiko Motoo; March 10, 1934 – April 6, 2022). They debuted in 1951 as a duo under their real names. The Fujiko Fujio name was used for their respective works from 1953 until 1987, when Fujimoto became too ill to work consistently.

The pair was best known for their popular children's manga series, including Obake no Q-Tarō, Ninja Hattori-kun, Kaibutsu-kun, Perman, Kiteretsu Daihyakka and Doraemon. Some of their influences include Osamu Tezuka as well as international cartoons and comic books. Both artists base their writing style on a mix of morals with a subversive and wry sense of humor; their styles would evolve to the point of diversion, where Fujimoto focused on speculative science fiction in addition to children's works, while Abiko leaned towards the surreal and black comedy.

Their work received critical acclaim and, on Fujimoto's part, universal recognition, with Doraemon being officially recognized as a cultural icon of modern Japan.

== Pen names ==
For many years after their debut, they collaborated and wrote individually under one pen name. However, after 1988, they published under separate names.

Pen names of each era
AD	Fujimoto	collaboration	Abiko
December 1951–	Hiroshi Fujimoto	—	Motoo Abiko
November 1952–	Hiroshi Fujimoto	Ashizuka Fujio	Motoo Abiko
July 1953–February 1988	Fujiko Fujio		
February 1988–	Fujiko Fujio F	—	Fujiko A. Fujio
January 1989–	Fujiko F. Fujio	—	Fujiko A. Fujio

=== Fujiko Fujio ===
From July 1953 to around January 1988, the two published both collaborations and individual works under one pen name, Fujiko Fujio (藤子 不二雄).

=== Fujiko F. Fujio ===
Fujimoto used the pen name Fujiko F. Fujio, stylized as Fujiko・F・Fujio (藤子・F・不二雄), from 1989 until his death.

=== Fujiko A. Fujio ===
Abiko used the pen name Fujiko Fujio A, stylized as Fujiko Fujio Ⓐ (藤子不二雄Ⓐ), from 1988 until his death. His pen name is romanized as Fujiko A. Fujio in Western publications.

== Biography ==
Hiroshi Fujimoto and Motoo Abiko were both from Toyama Prefecture. Fujimoto was born on December 1, 1933, and Abiko on March 10, 1934. Abiko transferred to Fujimoto's elementary school in Takaoka City and happened to see Fujimoto drawing in a notebook. The two became lifelong friends, and during the early years of their friendship kept their illustrations hidden from friends and classmates out of embarrassment.

In junior high school they were greatly influenced by Osamu Tezuka and his manga series Shin Takarajima. Fujimoto built a homemade episcope and together they wrote a piece for it called Tenküma, which was their first collaborative work. They started submitting work to periodicals such as Manga Shōnen and opened a joint savings account through Japan Post to which they both contributed funds and which they used to purchase art supplies. They divided all income and expenses equally between each other, a practice they continued throughout the life of their partnership.

In high school, they made their publishing debut, Tenshi no Tama-chan being adopted for serialization by Mainichi Shogakusei Shimbun in 1951. That same year they paid a visit to Tezuka's residence in Takarazuka, Hyōgo and showed him illustrations for their work titled Ben Hur. Tezuka complimented the two's abilities, some years later commenting that he knew then they were going to be major figures in the manga industry. Abiko and Fujimoto treasured the meeting with the respected Tezuka, and kept the Ben Hur illustrations for their entire lives. It was at this time they decided to make their partnership permanent. The two initially adopted the name Tezuka Fujio out of respect, but later changed it to Ashizuka Fujio as they perceived the use of the name "Tezuka" as too close to that of their idol.

Because both Fujimoto and Abiko were eldest sons respectively, they decided to take company jobs after graduating from high school in 1952. Fujimoto found employment with a confectionery company, and Abiko began working for the Toyama Newspaper Company. However, Fujimoto quit within a matter of days. Fujimoto then dedicated his time to submitting work to periodicals, with Abiko assisting him on the weekends. Their first serial as Ashizuka Fujio was terminated in a few episodes, followed by success with the post-apocalyptic science fiction series Utopia: The Last World War (UTOPIA—最後の世界大戦, UTOPIA: Saigo no Sekai Taisen).

At Fujimoto's urging, they elected to move to Tokyo in 1954 as professional manga artists, Abiko only reluctantly as he had steady employment at the Toyama Newspaper Company. Their first place of residence was a two-tatami mat room at the second floor of a watch shop. They eventually moved to the Tokiwa-sō apartment complex when Tezuka offered them a room that he was moving out of. Together with Hiroo Terada and several other manga artists of the period, they formed a collaborative group called "New Manga Party" (新漫画党, Shin Manga-To). At the apartment complex where the group was based, they enjoyed a period of productivity that had Fujimoto and Abiko carry up to six serials a month for publication. Additionally, Abiko contributed to Tezuka's works as an artist assistant, such as drawing a blizzard on the last page of Jungle Emperor.

The workload proved excessive, and in 1955 on return to Toyama for Japanese New Year the pair missed all the deadlines for their serials. The loss of credibility with publishers hurt Fujimoto and Abiko for a year. During the Tokiwa-sō era, they purchased a television set in Akihabara and made independent films with an 8mm camera. By 1959 they left Tokiwa-sō and moved to Kawasaki in Kanagawa Prefecture. In the 1960s, Fujimoto and Abiko founded Fujiko Studio Co., Ltd., a joint manga production company. Fujimoto got married on October 31, 1962, at the age of 28.

In 1963, Fujimoto and Abiko established Studio Zero with Shin'ichi Suzuki, Shotaro Ishimori, Jirō Tsunoda and Kiyoichi Tsunoda. Later Fujio Akatsuka joined, and at its peak the studio employed about 80 people. The studio produced several animated series and stood in for Mushi Production for an episode of Astro Boy. These were some of the duo's most productive years, resulting in series such as Obake no Q-Tarō which eventually were made into anime series on television. Abiko got married in 1966, at the age of 32. Fujimoto concentrated on titles for children, with a particular interest in science fiction.

In 1968, Abiko started making manga for a more mature audience, with titles such as Kuroi Salesman. In the 1970s, Abiko focused on both adult and boys' manga. The style was full of black humor. Fujimoto focused on both adult and childhood manga. His style was notable for its sense of wonder.

Doraemon was created in 1969. Since around 1974, its popularity has skyrocketed among Japanese children. CoroCoro Comic released its first issue in 1977 to showcase the works of Fujiko Fujio. With syndication of Doraemon on TV Asahi in 1979, a surge of popularity saw up to a dozen collaborative and solo works by Fujimoto and Abiko picked up for publication and syndication throughout the 1980s. Doraemon is the only work by the duo to ever get an official release in English-speaking countries, most notably the United States, though English dubs of work such as Perman and Ninja Hattori-kun have aired in Asia to less fanfare. Bones have produced an adaptation of Fujimoto's series Time Patrol Bon for Netflix, an unusual move due to the original series' obscurity.

In 1987, citing creative differences, Fujimoto and Abiko ended their long partnership to concentrate on solo projects. From now on, Abiko would work at Fujiko Studio K.K. and Fujimoto in Fujiko F. Fujio Pro K.K. Abiko adopted the pen name Fujiko A. Fujio, while Fujimoto adopted the pen name Fujiko F. Fujio.

According to Abiko, the cause for the dissolution of the partnership was due to Fujimoto discovering he had stomach cancer in 1986, and both Fujimoto and Abiko had a desire to settle copyright and financial issues before the other died.

Fujimoto died of liver failure at a hospital in Shinjuku on September 23, 1996.

A documentary was aired on TV Asahi on February 19, 2006, chronicling the life and times of Fujiko F. Fujio.

The Fujiko F. Fujio Museum opened in Kawasaki, Kanagawa on September 3, 2011, which features a reproduction of Fujio's studio and a display of their artwork.

Abiko died of natural causes at his home in Kawasaki on April 6, 2022.

== Awards ==
Fujiko Fujio

- 1963 – Shogakukan Manga Award (Susume Roboket and Tebukuro Tecchan)
- 1973 – Japan Cartoonists Association Award Excellence Award (Doraemon)
- 1981 – Kawasaki City's Cultural Prize (川崎市文化賞) (Fujiko Fujio)
- 1982 – Shogakukan Manga Award for children's manga (Doraemon)
- 1984 – "Movie day" Special Achievement Medal (Fujiko Fujio)
- 1984 – Golden Gloss Prize (ゴールデングロス賞) (Movie Doraemon)

Fujiko F. Fujio

- 1989, 1990, 1991, 1992, 1993, 1994, 1996, 1997, and more – Golden Gloss Prize (ゴールデングロス賞) (Movie Doraemon etc.)
- 1989 – "Movie day" Certificate of appreciation (Fujiko F. Fujio)
- 1994 – Japan Cartoonists Association Award Minister of Education Award (Doraemon)
- 1995 – Fujimoto Award Encouragement Award (Fujiko F. Fujio (Movie Doraemon series production))
- 1996 – "Movie day" Special Achievement Medal (Fujiko F. Fujio)
- 1997 – The first Tezuka Osamu Cultural Prize Grand Prize (Doraemon)

Fujiko A. Fujio

- 1990 – Fujimoto Award Special prize (Fujiko A. Fujio (Movie Shonen jidai producer))
- 1990 – Yamaji Fumiko Cultural Foundation Special Award (Fujiko A. Fujio (Shonen jidai producer))
- 2005 – Japan Cartoonists Association Award Minister of Education, Culture, Sports, Science and Technology Award (All works)
- 2008 – Order of the Rising Sun (Fujiko A. Fujio)
- 2014 – Tezuka Osamu Cultural Prize Special Award (Manga Michi and Ai... Shirisomeshi Koro ni...)

== Works ==
- All works (Japanese)
  - Fujiko Fujio's Serialization list
  - Fujiko Fujio's One-shot list

=== Fujiko Fujio's works (collaboration) ===
English title (Note: Official title or literal or parallel translation.)	Japanese title	Year
Angel Tama-chan (Note: Literal translation) (Note: Under the names "Abiko Motoo, Fujimoto Hiroshi".)	Tenshi no Tama-chan (天使の玉ちゃん)	1951–1952
Drifting for 40,000 Years (Note: Under pen name "Ashizuka Fujio".)	4 Man-nen hyōryū (四万年漂流)	1953
UTOPIA: The Final World War	UTOPIA: Saigo no Sekai Taisen (UTOPIA 最後の世界大戦)	1953
Prince of the Sea	Umi no Ōji (海の王子)	1959–1965
Invisible Racing Car	Kieru Kaisokusha (きえる快速車)	1963
Little Ghost Q-Taro	Obake no Q-Tarō (オバケのQ太郎)	1964–1966
Wakatono	(わかとの)	1964–1965
Great Dog Tintin	Meiken Tantan (名犬タンタン)	1965–1968
Beret Shin-chan	Berē no Shin-chan (ベレーのしんちゃん)	1965–1966
Jirokichi	(ジロキチ)	1965–1966
Gloves Te-chan (1966)	Tebukuro Tetchan (てぶくろてっちゃん)	1966
Perman (1966) (Note: Perman (1983) is Fujimoto's solo work.)	Pāman (パーマン)	1966–1968
Chintara Kami-chan	(チンタラ神ちゃん)	1967
New Little Ghost Q-Taro	Shin Obake no Q-Tarō (Note: When serialized in a magazine, Obake no Q-Taro. The word "New" was attached only to books and animations.) (新オバケのQ太郎)	1971–1973, 1976
Senbe	Senbē (仙べえ)	1971–1972

=== Fujiko Fujio's works (Fujimoto alone) ===
English title	Japanese title	Year
Gloves Te-chan (1960)	Tebukuro Tetchan (てぶくろてっちゃん)	1960–1963
Go! Roboket	Susume Roboket (すすめロボケット)	1961–1965
21 Emon: The 21st Century Kid	21 Emon (21エモン)	1967–1969, 1981
Super-san (one-shot)	(スーパーさん)	1968
Plum Star Denka (Note: Literal translation. ウメ星 (umeboshi) is a pun on umeboshi, Japanese pickled ume fruits or "salted plums", and the word 星 (hoshi; star, planet). デンカ (Denka; His Highness) is the main character's name.)	Umeboshi Denka (ウメ星デンカ)	1968–1970
Mojacko	Mojakō (モジャ公)	1969–1970
Doraemon	(ドラえもん)	1969–1988
Pokonyan (Rocky Rackat! (Note: TV anime series title.))	(ポコニャン)	1970–1978
Bonom: Sokonuke-san (Note: Sokonuke-san means Mr. Bottomless.) (one-shot)	(ボノム =底ぬけさん=)	1970
Dojita Dojiro's Luck (one-shot)	Dojita Dojirō no Kōun (ドジ田ドジ郎の幸運)	1970
Adventures of Dobinson	Dobinson Hyōryūki (ドビンソン漂流記)	1971–1972
Old Bachelor (one-shot)	Jijinuki (じじぬき)	1970
Self Meeting (one-shot)	Jibun Kaigi (自分会議)	1972
Jungle Kurobe	Jungle Kurobē (ジャングル黒べえ)	1973
Pajamaman	(パジャママン)	1973–1974
Mokkoro-kun	(モッコロくん)	1973–1975
Bakeru-kun	(バケルくん)	1974–1976, 1984
Nostaljii (one-shot)	Nosutarujī (ノスタル爺)	1974
Kiteretsu	Kiteretsu Daihyakka (キテレツ大百科)	1974–1977
Zo-kun and Risu-chan	Zō-kun to Risu-chan (ぞうくんとりすちゃん)	1974–1975
Mikio and MIKIO	Mikio to MIKIO (みきおとミキオ)	1974–1975
Red-Haired Anko (one-shot)	Akage no Anko (赤毛のアン子) (Note: Re-titled Anko Ōi ni Ikaru (アン子 大いに怒る) in later short story compilations.)	1974
Fourth Dimension Hat P-Poko	4 Jigen Bō P-Poko (4じげんぼうPポコ)	1975–1976
33,000 Square Meters (one-shot)	3 Man 3 Zen Hēbē (3万3千平米)	1975
Lone War of the Worlds (one-shot)	Hitoribotchi no Uchū Sensō (ひとりぼっちの宇宙戦争)	1975
Ultra-Super-Deluxeman (one-shot)	(ウルトラ・スーパー・デラックスマン)	1975
Bellavo	Berabō (ベラボー)	1968–1969
U-Bow	U-Bō (Uボー)	1976–1978
Minister Bowbow	Baubau Daijin (バウバウ大臣)	1976
Captain Bon	(きゃぷてんボン)	1976
Mami the Psychic	Esper Mami (エスパー魔美)	1976–1983
Alien Report: Sample A and B (one-shot)	Uchūjin Report: Sample A to B (宇宙人レポート サンプルAとB)	1977
Middle-aged Superman Mr. Saenai	Chūnen Superman Saenai-shi (中年スーパーマン左江内氏)	1977–1978
That Idiot Aims for the Wilderness (one-shot)	Ano Baka wa Kōya wo Mezasu (あのバカは荒野をめざす)	1977
Time Patrol Bon	T. P. Bon (T・Pぼん)	1978–1985
His Time Machine (one-shot)	Aitsu no Time Machine (あいつのタイムマシン)	1979
Mira-cle-1	Mira-kuru-1 (ミラ・クル・1)	1979
One Day... (one-shot)	Aru Hi... (ある日......)	1982
Worldscope (one-shot)	Shikaikyō (四海鏡)	1982
Perman (1983) (Note: Perman (1966) is a collaboration.)	Pāman (パーマン)	1983–1986
Chu-Poko	Chū-Poko (宙ポコ)	1983
Toppi the Space Puppy	Chūken Toppi (宙犬トッピ)	1983–1984
Chimpui	(チンプイ)	1985–1988

=== Fujiko Fujio's works (Abiko alone) ===
English title	Japanese title	Year
My name is X-kun	Wagana wa X-kun (わが名はXくん)	1957–1958, 1959–1962
Silver Cross	(シルバー・クロス)	1960–1963
Galaxy Captain	Ginga Senchō (銀河船長)	1961–1962
Big 1	(ビッグ・1)	1962
Prince Ciscon	Shisukon Ōji (シスコン王子)	1963–1964
Futa-kun	Fūta-kun (フータくん)	1964–1967
Ninja Hattori	Ninja Hattori-kun (忍者ハットリくん)	1964–1968, 1981–1988
Three Z Men	(スリーZメン)	1964–1965
Tako-kun in My House	Bokunchi no Tako-kun (ぼくんちのタコくん)	1965–1967
The Monster Kid	Kaibutsu-kun (怪物くん)	1965–1969, 1972, 1980–1982
Masked X-kun	Mask no X-kun (マスクのXくん)	1965–1966
Manganica	(マンガニカ)	1967–1971
Monster Boy Wakatono (Note: Free translation)	Kaijin Wakatono (怪人わかとの)	1967–1968
The Black Salesman (one-shot)	KUROI SEeRUSUMAN (黒イせぇるすまん)	1968
Biriken	(ビリ犬)	1969
The Black Salesman (serialization)	KUROi SEeRUSUMAN (黒ィせぇるすまん)	1969–1971
Kurobe	Kurobē (黒ベエ)	1969–1970
Masked Taro	Kamen Tarō (仮面太郎)	1969–1970
Madmen Team	Kyōjin Gun (狂人軍) (Note: Parody of Yomiuri Giants (巨人軍, Kyojin Gun).)	1969–1970
Uncle HiTLer	HitTORAa Oji San (ひっとらぁ伯父サン)	1969, 1971
Bolaevon	Bōraewon (ボラエヲン)	1970-1993
Mumako	(夢魔子)	1970
Gekiga Mao Zedong	Gekiga Mō Takutō Den (劇画毛沢東伝)	1970–1971
Phantom Hen-dayou	Maboroshi Hendayū (マボロシ変太夫)	1971–1972
Mr. Nameless	Mumei-kun (無名くん)	1971–1976
Kappa Kappo	Kappa no Kappo (かっぱのカッポ)	1972–1974
Mataro is Coming!!	Matarō ga Kuru!! (魔太郎がくる!!)	1972–1975
Mr. Tour Conductor	Tenjō-san (添乗さん)	1972–1974
Nonsense Man	Zare Otoko (戯れ男) (Note: Pun on 戯言 (zaregoto; nonsense).)	1973
Love Thief	Ai Nusubito (愛ぬすびと)	1973
Katsuagemaru Extortion Company	Katsuagemaru Yusuri Shōkai (喝揚丸ユスリ商会)	1973
Sasurai-kun	Sasurai-kun (さすらいくん)	1973–1981
Saru the ProGolfer	ProGolfer Saru (プロゴルファー猿)	1974–1980, 1982–1988
Love Traveler	Ai Tazunebito (愛たずねびと)	1974
Old man Bo-Taro	Oyaji Bōtarō (オヤジ坊太郎)	1975–1976
Miss Dracula	(ミス・ドラキュラ)	1975–1980
I am Assistant Chief	Ore Kakarichō Hosa (オレ係長補佐)	1975–1976
Black Company Henkiro	Black Shōkai Henkirō (ブラック商会変奇郎)	1976–1977
Manga Michi	(まんが道)	1977–1982, 1986–1988
Parman's Days	Parman no Hibi (パーマンの日々)	1978–1980
Shonen Jidai (Childhood Days)	Shōnen Jidai (少年時代)	1978–1979
Futa-kun NOW!	(フータくん NOW!)	1982–1983
Parman's Reserved Seat	Parman no Shiteiseki (パーマンの指定席)	1982–1987
Dream Tunnel	Yume Tonneru (夢トンネル)	1983–1984
Ninja Hattori + Perman	Ninja Hattori-kun + Pāman (忍者ハットリくん+パーマン)	1983–1985 (Note: Manga serialization started in November 1983 (Corocoro Comic).)
Ultra B	(ウルトラB)	1984–1988

=== Fujiko F. Fujio's works (Fujimoto) ===
English title	Japanese title	Year
Doraemon	(ドラえもん)	1988–1997
Chimpui	(チンプイ)	1988–1991
Ginger X	(ぎんとご X)	1988
Future Memories	Mirai no Omoide (未来の想い出)	1991
Alien Mr. Andro (one-shot)	Ijin Andoro-shi (異人アンドロ氏)	1995

=== Fujiko A. Fujio's works (Abiko) ===
English title	Japanese title	Year
Ninja Hattori	Ninja Hattori-kun (忍者ハットリくん)	1988
Saru the ProGolfer	ProGolfer Saru (プロゴルファー猿)	1988, 1989
Manga Michi	(まんが道)	1988
Ultra B	(ウルトラB)	1988–1989
Biriken	(ビリ犬)	1988–1989
Takamori Runs	Takamori ga Hashiru (タカモリが走る)	1988–1991
Biriken All Trading Company	Biriken Nandemo Shōkai (ビリ犬なんでも商会)	1988–1989
Parasol Henbe	Parasol Hembē (パラソルヘンべえ)	1989–1991
The Laughing Salesman	WARAu SEeRUSUMAN (笑ゥせぇるすまん)	1989–1995
Love... When I knew it... :Youth of Maga Michio	Ai... Shirisomeshi Koro ni... :Maga Michio no Seishun (愛...しりそめし頃に... — 満賀道雄の青春)	1989, 1990, 1995–2013
Sudden Death	(サドンデス)	1991–1992
Prince Demokin	(プリンスデモキン)	1991–1999
YOUM (Note: A Japanese book with an English title.)	YOUM (憂夢, Yūmu)	1991–1995
PARMAN's days	PARMAN no Hibi (PARMANの日々)	1991–1992
Drifting Around The World (Note: Listed in the table of contents of Japanese books.)	World Hyōryūki (ワールド漂流記)	1993–1995
Kirito Come!!	Kirito ga Kita!! (切人がきた!!)	1994–1996
Parman's Days of Dream and Roses	Parman no Yume to Bara no Hibi (パーマンの夢とバラの日々)	1995–1996
The Salesman Returns	KAEtTEKITA SEeRUSUMAN (帰ッテキタせぇるすまん)	1996, 1998–2000
Moguro Fukujiro's Work	Moguro Fukujirō no Shigoto (喪黒福次郎の仕事)	1997–1998
Yojimbo	Yōjinbō (用心棒)	1998
Hoa!! Koike-san	(ホアー!! 小池さん)	1998–2001
SARU	(サル)	1998–2005
The Dancing Salesman	ODORU SEeRUSUMAN (踊ルせぇるすまん)	2001, 2003–2006
PARman's Passionate Days	PARman no Jōnetsuteki na Hibi (PARマンの情熱的な日々)	2007–2015
Life Proverb Funny "MAN" Encyclopedia	Jinsei Kotowaza Omoshiro "Man" Jiten (人生ことわざ面白"漫"辞典)	2007–2022
The Monster Kid (one-shot)	Kaibutsu-kun (怪物くん)	2011
