= Sukekiyo Kameyama =

Japanese voice actor (1954–2013)

- Born: November 9, 1954; Ishinomaki, Miyagi Prefecture, Japan
- Died: January 26, 2013 (aged 58)
- Occupation: Voice actor
- Years active: 1977–2013

Sukekiyo Kameyama (亀山助清, Kameyama Sukekiyo; born November 9, 1954 – January 26, 2013) was a Japanese voice actor. He played many supporting roles in television dramas. Kameyama was employed by the talent management firm Kiraboshi.

== Death ==
Kameyama died aged 58. The cause of death is pneumonia.

== Filmography ==
=== Television animation ===
- Maison Ikkoku (1986) (Asuna's father)

Unknown date

- Anpanman (????) (Ankora)
- Highschool! Kimen-gumi (????) (Honekishi Muzō)
- Kimba the White Lion (3rd series) (????) (Tony)
- Konjiki no Gash Bell!! (????) (Dr. Ichiro)
- Pastel Yumi, the Magic Idol (????) (Musutaki)
- Magical Angel Creamy Mami (????) (Hayato Kidokoro)
- Mahōjin Guru Guru (????) (Kasegi)
- Midnight Horror School (????) (Saraman-sensei)
- Shura no Toki – Age of Chaos (????) (Yagyū Munenori)
- Ranpō (????) (Karatarō)
- Rurouni Kenshin (????) (Detective Muraki)
- Tokusō Kihei Dorvack (????) (Pierre Bonaparte)
- Zipang (????) (Masanobu Tsuji)

=== OVA ===
- Legend of the Galactic Heroes (1989) (Lao)

=== Movies ===
- Laputa: Castle in the Sky (1986) (Henri)

=== Video games ===
- Brave Fencer Musashi (????) (Harchinose)
- Kingdom Hearts II (????) (Winnie-the-Pooh)
- Sly Cooper and The Thievius Raccoonus (????) (Sir Raleigh) (PS2 Dub)
- Kingdom Hearts Birth by Sleep (????) (Winnie-the-Pooh)

=== Tokusatsu ===
- La Belle Fille Masquée Poitrine (1990) (Okawa-sensei)
- Chōriki Sentai Ohranger (1995) (Voice of Bara Skunk (ep. 36))
- Gekisou Sentai Carranger (1996) (Voice of UU Ussu (ep. 33))

=== Other voice over ===
==== Live-action dubbing ====
- 101 Dalmatians (2001 TV Asahi edition) (Horace (Mark Williams))

==== Animation ====
- An Extremely Goofy Movie (P.J.)
- Cinderella II: Dreams Come True (Gus)
- Winnie-the-Pooh (3rd series) (Pooh)
