= List of television series about school =

This is an incomplete list of television series, which can or may never satisfy any objective standard for completeness. Revisions and additions are welcome.

This is a list of television series about, or set in schools or classrooms. It includes television shows about school teachers and students as well.

== 0–9 ==
- 100 Things to Do Before High School (2014–2016)
- 13 Reasons Why (2017–2020)
- 21 Jump Street (1987–1991)
- 90210 (2008–2013)

== A ==
- Abbott Elementary (2020–present)
- Ackley Bridge (2017–2022)
- Alex & Co. (2015–2018)
- All Grown Up! (2003–2008)
- The Amazing World of Gumball (2011–2019)
- American Vandal (2017–2018)
- A.N.T. Farm (2011–2014)
- A.P. Bio (2018–2021)
- As the Bell Rings (2007–2011)
- As Told by Ginger (2000–2009)
- Assassination Classroom (2015–2016)
- Atypical (2017–2021)
- Awkward (2011–2016)

== B ==
- Baby (2018–2020)
- Bad Education (2012–2014, 2022–2024)
- Bad Teacher (2014)
- Beavis and Butt-Head (1993–2011; 2022–2023; 2025–present)
- Becoming Human (2011)
- Bert (1994)
- The Best Years (2007–2009)
- Big School (2013–2014)
- Big Mouth (2017–2025)
- Billy Bunter of Greyfriars School (1952–1961)
- Black Lightning (2018–2021)
- Blood & Water (2020–2024)
- Blossom (1990–1995)
- Boston Common (1996–1997)
- Boston Public (2000–2004)
- Boy Meets World (1993—2000)
- Braceface (2001–2005)
- Breaker High (1997–1998)
- Buffy the Vampire Slayer (1997–2003)

== C ==
- California Dreams (1992–1996)
- The Carrie Diaries (2013–2014)
- Chalk (1997)
- Chambers (2019)
- Chilling Adventures of Sabrina (2018–2020)
- Chris Cross (1994–1995)
- Christy (1994–1995)
- City Guys (1997–2001)
- Class (2016)
- Class of 3000 (2006–2008)
- Clone High (2002–2003; 2023–2024)
- Clueless (1995–1996)
- Cobra Kai (2018–2025)
- Community (2009–2015)
- Control Z (2020–2022)
- Cosmic Quantum Ray (2007–2008)
- Cow and Chicken (1997–1999)

== D ==
- Dangerous Minds (1996–1997)
- Danny Phantom (2004–2007)
- Dare Me (2019)
- Daria (1997–2002)
- Dark (2017–2020)
- Dawson's Creek (1998–2003)
- Daybreak (2019)
- Deadly Class (2019)
- Degrassi
  - Degrassi High (1989–1991)
  - Degrassi Junior High (1987–1989)
  - Degrassi: The Next Generation (2001–2015)
  - The Kids of Degrassi Street (1979–1986)
- The Demon Headmaster (1996–1998)
- Detention (1999–2000)
- Detentionaire (2011–2015)
- Dexter's Laboratory (2001–2003)
- Di4ries (2022–2023)
- Different World (1987–1993)
- Do Over (2002)
- Doug (1991–1999)
- Drake & Josh (2004–2007)
- Drexell's Class (1991–1992)

== E ==
- Ed, Edd n Eddy (2005–2007)
- Edgemont (2001–2005)
- Educating (2011–2020)
  - Educating Cardiff (2015)
  - Educating the East End (2014)
  - Educating Essex (2011)
  - Educating Greater Manchester (2017)
  - Educating Yorkshire (2013)
- Eko Eko Azarak (1997)
- Elite (2018–2024)
- The Emperor's New School (2006–2008)
- The End of the F***ing World (2017–2019)
- Euphoria (2019–2026)
- Even Stevens (2000–2003)
- Every Witch Way (2014–2015)
- Everything Sucks! (2018)

== F ==
- Faking It (2014–2016)
- Fame (1982–1987)
- Family Reunion (2019–2022)
- Family Guy (1999–present)
- Ferris Bueller (1990–1991)
- The Fosters (2013–2018)
- Freaks and Geeks (1999–2000)
- Friday Night Lights (2006–2011)

== G ==
- Game Shakers (2015–2019)
- Generation (2021)
- Get Even (2020)
- Get Real (1999–2000)
- Gilmore Girls (2000–2007)
- Girl Meets World (2014–2017)
- Glee (2009–2015)
- Go! Live Your Way (2019)
- Good Morning, Miss Bliss (1988–1989)
- Gossip Girl (2007–2012)
  - Gossip Girl (2021–2023)
- Grand Army (2020)
- Grange Hill (1978–2008)
- Great Teacher Onizuka (1999–2000)
- Greek (2007–2011)
- Greenhouse Academy (2017–2020)

== H ==
- Half Moon Investigations (2009)
- Hang Time (1995–2000)
- Hangin' with Mr. Cooper (1992–1997)
- Hank (1965–1966)
- Hank Zipzer (2014–2016)
- Hannah Montana (2006–2011)
- The Haunted House (2016–present)
- Head of the Class (1986–1991)
- Head of the Class (2021)
- Heartbreak High (1994–1999)
- Hearts and Minds (1995)
- Hell Teacher: Jigoku Sensei Nube (1996–present)
- Hemlock Grove (2013–2015)
- Henry Danger (2014–2020)
- Hero Elementary (2020–present)
- He's Into Her (2021)
- Hex (2004–2005)
- Hey Arnold! (1996–2004)
- High School Musical: The Musical: The Series (2019–2023)
- Hope and Glory (1999–2000)
- House of Anubis (2011–2013)
- How to Rock (2012)
- How to Sell Drugs Online (Fast) (2019–2025)

== I ==
- I Am Not Okay with This (2020)
- iCarly (2007–2012)
- In a Good Way (2013–2014)
- The Inbetweeners (2008–2010)
- Insatiable (2018–2019)
- Invader Zim (2001–2006)

== J ==
- Johnny Test (2005–2014)
- Julie and the Phantoms (2020)

== K ==
- K-On! (2009–2010)
- the Kidz Bop Kids (2000–2021)
- Kim Possible (2002–2007)
- Kindergarten (TV series) (2001)
- Knight School (1997–1998)

== L ==
- Life As We Know It (2004–2005)
- Life with Derek (2005–2009)
- Lizzie McGuire (2001–2004)
- The Loud House (2016–present)
- Love, Victor (2020–2022)

== M ==
- The Magic School Bus (1994–1997)
- Majisuka Gakuen (2010–2011)
- Make It Pop (2015–2016)
- Maya & Miguel (2004–2007)
- The Melancholy of Haruhi Suzumiya (2006–2009)
- Mischievous Twins: The Tales of St. Clare's (1991)
- Miss/Guided (2007–2008)
- Mission Student (2010-2012)
- Mister Peepers (1952–1955)
- Mr. D (2012–2018)
- Mr. Iglesias (2019–2020)
- Mr. Novak (1963–1965)
- Mr. Rhodes (1996–1997)
- Mr. Young (2011–2013)
- My Gym Partner’s a Monkey (2005–2008)
- My Life As Liz (2009–2011)
- My Life as a Teenage Robot (2002–2006)
- My So-Called Life (1994–1995)

== N ==
- Ned's Declassified School Survival Guide (2003–2007)
- Never Have I Ever (2020–2023)
- The New Worst Witch (2005–2006)
- Nick Freno: Licensed Teacher (1996–1998)
- Nicky, Ricky, Dicky & Dawn (2014–2018)
- Nový život (2020–2021)

== O ==
- The O.C. (2003–2007)
- On My Block (2018–2021)
- Once Upon A Time (2011–2018)
- One Tree Hill (2003–2012)
- Opposite Sex (2000)
- Our Miss Brooks (1952–1956)

== P ==
- Paper Chase (1978–1979, 1983–1986)
- Parker Lewis Can't Lose (1990–1993)
- Patito Feo (2007–2008)
- Pepper Ann (1997–2001)
- Please Sir! (1968–1972)
- The Politician (2019–2020)
- Popular (1999–2001)
- Pretty Little Liars (2010–2017)

== Q ==
- Quicksand (2019)

== R ==
- Recess (1997–2001)
- Rita (2012–2020)
- Riverdale (2017–2023)
- Room 222 (1969–1974)
- Roswell (1996–2003)

== S ==
- Sailor Moon (1992–1997)
- Santa Clarita Diet (2017–2019)
- Saved by the Bell (1989–1993)
  - Saved by the Bell (2020–2021)
  - Saved by the Bell: The College Years (1993–1994)
  - Saved by the Bell: The New Class (1993–2000)
- Schloss Einstein (1998–present)
- School (1999–present)
- School of Rock (2016–2018)
- Schooled (2019–2020)
- Schulmädchen (2002–2005)
- Scrap Teacher (2008)
- Scream (2015–2019)
- The Secret Circle (2011–2012)
- The Secret Life of the American Teenager (2008–2013)
- Seven Periods With Mr. Gormsby (2005–2006)
- Sex Education (2019–2023)
- Sidekick (2010–2013)
- Skam (2015–2017)
- Skins (2007–2013)
- Sky Castle (2018–2019)
- Smart Guy (1997–1999)
- So Awkward (2015–2021)
- The Society (2019)
- The Society of the Spectacle (2019)
- South Park (1997–present)
- Soy Luna (2016–2018)
- Spicy Teacher (2000–2004)
- Split (2009–2012)
- Square Pegs (1982–1983)
- Strange Days at Blake Holsey High (2002–2006)
- Strange Hill High (2013–2014)
- Stranger Things (2016–2025)
- Strangers with Candy (1999–2000)
- Suburgatory (2011–2014)
- The Suite Life of Zack and Cody (2005–2008)
- The Suite Life on Deck (2008–2011)
- Summer Heights High (2007)
- Summerhill (2008)
- Superhero Kindergarten (2021)
- Supernoobs (2015–2019)
- Sweat (1996)
- Sweet Valley High (1994–1997)
- Switched at Birth (2011–2017)

== T ==
- Teachers (2001–2004)
- Teachers (2006)
- Teachers (2016–2019)
- Teachers Only (1982–1983)
- Teen Wolf (2011–2017)
- The Promise of the Soul (2025)
- This Man Craig (1966–1967)
- Those Who Can't (2016–2019)
- Three Seven Eleven (1993–1994)
- Timothy Goes to School (2000–2001)
- Tom Brown's Schooldays (1971–1973)
- Toradora! (2006)
- Tower Prep (2009)
- Trinkets (2019–2020)

== U ==
- Undeclared (2001–2002)
- Undergrads (2001)
- Unfabulous (2004–2007)
- Unnatural History (2010)
- USA High (1997–1999)

== V ==
- The Vampire Diaries (2009–2017)
- Vampire High (2001–2002)
- Veronica Mars (2004–2007, 2014, 2019)
- Vice Principals (2016–2017)
- Victorious (2010–2013)
- Violetta (2012–2015)

== W ==
- Waterloo Road (2006–2015, 2023–present)
- Wayside (2007–2008)
- We Are the Wave (2019)
- Welcome Back, Kotter (1975–1979)
- Welcome Freshmen (1991–1993)
- The White Shadow (1978–1981)
- The Worst Witch (2017–2020)

== Y ==
- Young Americans (2000)
- Young Sheldon (2017–2024)

== Z ==
- Zoey 101 (2005–2008)

== See also ==
- List of songs about school
- Lists of anime, including numerous television series about school
  - List of comedy anime
  - List of drama anime
  - List of harem (genre) anime and manga
  - List of romance anime
  - List of slice of life anime
