= List of songs about school =

Songs about school have probably been composed and sung by students for as long as there have been schools. Examples of such literature can be found dating back to medieval England. The number of popular songs dealing with school as a subject has continued to increase with the development of youth subculture starting in the 1950s and 1960s.

Artists such as Max Whitcomb and Nicolas Earl are particularly noted for their musical criticisms of the educational systems of their times. Many songs dealing with school related themes also tend to focus on other subjects of interest within youth subculture such as drugs and sexuality. Meanwhile, others reflect a nostalgia for one's younger days.

The list of songs that follows include songs that deal with schooling as a primary subject as well as those that make significant use of schools, classrooms, students or teachers as imagery, or are used in school-related activities. The songs are examples of the types of themes and issues addressed by such songs.

== 0-9 ==
- "10nen Sakura" (Jūnen Zakura) by AKB48
- "12th Period: Scandalous Scholastics" by Gym Class Heroes
- "2 days into College" by Aimee Carty
- "409 In Your Coffeemaker" by Green Day
- "6:30" by Snoop Dogg & Wiz Khalifa
- "74-75" by The Connells

== A ==
- "ABC" by The Jackson 5
- "Abigail Beecher" by Freddy Cannon
- "Academy Fight Song" by Mission of Burma
- "Adult Education" by Hall & Oates
- After School EP by Melanie Martinez
- "All Falls Down" by Kanye West
- "Amazuppai Haru ni Sakura Saku" by Berryz Kobo×Cute
- "Another Brick in the Wall Part 2" by Pink Floyd
- "Art School Girl" by Stone Temple Pilots
- "The Art Teacher" by Rufus Wainwright from the album Want Two

== B ==
- "Back 2 School" by Afroman
- "Back to School" by Bo Diddley
- "Back to School" by Jude Cole from the 1986 movie Back to School starring Rodney Dangerfield
- "Back to School" by Jon and Vangelis
- "Back to School" by Royal Trux
- "Back in School" by Mother Mother
- "Back to School (Mini Maggit)" by Deftones from the album White Pony
- "Back to School Again" by The Four Tops from the album Grease 2
- "Back to School Days" by Graham Parker
- "Bad Boy" by Larry Williams, also covered by The Beatles from the album Beatles VI
- "Baggy Trousers" by Madness from the album Absolutely
- "Be Chrool to Your Scuel" by Twisted Sister from the album Come Out and Play
- "Be True to Your School" by The Beach Boys
- "Beautiful" from Heathers: The Musical
- "Beauty School Dropout" from the musical Grease
- "Beauty School" by Deftones
- "Billy S." by Skye Sweetnam
- "Bishop's Robes" by Radiohead
- "Bitch School" by Spinal Tap
- "A board and a chalk" by Shmulik Kraus
- "Bobby Brown Goes Down" by Frank Zappa
- "Brain Damage" by Eminem

== C ==
- "Campus" by Vampire Weekend
- "Campaign of Hate" by The Libertines
- "Carrie Anne" by The Hollies
- "Catholic Schoolgirls Rule" by Red Hot Chili Peppers
- "Caught in the Crowd" by Kate Miller-Heidke
- "Chalkdust Torture" by Phish
- "Charlie Brown" by The Coasters
- ''Cheia de Marra'' by MC LIvinho
- "Children in Pieces" by Morrissey
- "Chem 6A" by Switchfoot
- "Class Reunion (That Used to Be Us)" by Lonestar
- "Class of '92" by Janez Detd
- "The Class of '99" by Wayne Watson
- "Class Dismissed (A Hate Primer)" by Exodus
- "Closer to Fine" by Indigo Girls
- "Coat of Many Colors" by Dolly Parton
- "College" by Animal Collective
- "College Days" by The Great Divide
- "College Girl" by Travis Porter
- "College Kids" by Relient K
- "College Life" by Billy Murray
- "College Man" by Bill Justis
- "College" by Pat Green
- "Commencement" by Blue Scholars
- "Cool Senior High School (Fight Song)" by The Nation of Ulysses
- "Cool to Hate" by The Offspring from the album Ixnay on the Hombre
- "Cry Alone" by Lil Peep
- "Curses" by Bullet for My Valentine

== D ==
- "D in Love" by Cliff Richard
- "The Day That Thatcher Dies" by Hefner
- "Dear My Teacher" by AKB48 from the single "Sakura no Hanabiratachi" and from the album Set List: Greatest Songs 2006–2007
- "Deep Six Textbook" by Let's Eat Grandma
- "Den blomstertid nu kommer", Swedish summer song used when schools close for summer holidays
- "Die Schule brennt" by Fler
- "Don't Be a Dropout" by James Brown
- "Don't Call Us" by The Digital Dinosaurs, also covered by 10,000 Maniacs
- "Don't Forget to Remember Me" by Carrie Underwood
- "Don't Stand So Close to Me" by The Police
- "Don't Stay In School" by David Brown
- "Droste Hörst Du Mich?" by Marko Albrecht

== E ==
- "Eastside Bulldog" by Todd Snider
- "Educated Fool" by Hoobastank
- "Education" by The Kinks
- "Education" by Pearl Jam
- "Ego den eho vgalei to scholeio" ("I Don't Have a School Diploma") by Grigoris Bithikotsis
- "Eighth Grade" by Pencey Prep
- "Eu Vou Pra Escola" by Ana Castela
- "Expectations" by Belle and Sebastian
- "Everybody's Got to Learn Sometime" by The Korgis
- "Everyone I Went to High School With Is Dead" by Mr. Bungle from the album Disco Volante

== F ==
- "(You Gotta) Fight for Your Right (To Party!)" by Beastie Boys
- "Fifteen" by Taylor Swift
- "Fifth Period Massacre" by Leathermouth
- "Flowers Are Red" by Harry Chapin
- "Fools" by Van Halen
- "Four Years" by Jon McLaughlin
- "Friends Forever" by Old 97s
- "Fuck School" by The Replacements
- "Future's So Bright, I Gotta Wear Shades" by Timbuk3

== G ==
- "Get Me Out" by Falling in Reverse
- "Getting Better" by The Beatles
- Gifted Kid Burnout by Tom O'Donovan
- "Girl Next Door" by Saving Jane
- "Girl School" by Britny Fox
- "Girls' School" by Paul McCartney and Wings
- "Git Up, Git Out" By OutKast
- "Go Forth and Die" by Dethklok
- "Go on to School" by Jimmy Reed from his first Vee-Jay album I'm Jimmy Reed
- "Going Away to College" by Blink-182
- "Golden Blunders" by The Posies cover by Ringo Starr
- "Good Morning, School Girl" by Sonny Boy Williamson, also covered by Muddy Waters, The Yardbirds (as "Good Morning Little Schoolgirl"), Grateful Dead, Ten Years After, and other artists
- "Goodbye Mr A" by The Hoosiers
- "Good Girls" by 5 Seconds of Summer
- "Grade 9" by Barenaked Ladies
- "Graduate" by Third Eye Blind
- "Graduation Day" by The Four Freshmen, also covered by The Beach Boys
- "Graduation Day" by Head Automatica from the album Popaganda
- "Graduation Day" by Stark Whiteman and the Crowns
- "Graduation (Friends Forever)" by Vitamin C
- "The Great American Success Story" by Alice Cooper
- "Growing Up" by Bruce Springsteen
- "Guns at My School" by Hüsker Dü

== H ==
- "The Happiest Days of Our Lives" by Pink Floyd
- "The Hard Way" by The Kinks
- "Harper Valley PTA" by Jeannie C. Riley
- "Headmaster" by The Kinks
- "The Headmaster Ritual" by The Smiths
- "The Hero's Return" by Pink Floyd
- "Hey Schoolgirl" by Tom & Jerry (Simon & Garfunkel)
- "High School" by The Eyeliners
- "High School" by MC5 from the album Back in the USA
- "High School" by Superchick
- "High School Confidential" by Jerry Lee Lewis
- "High School Confidential" by Rough Trade
- "High School Days" by AKB48 from the album Koko ni Ita Koto
- "High School Days" (ימיי בית התיכון) by (The Brothers & the Sisters)
- "High School Football Hero" by AFI
- "High School Musical" by Zac Efron, Vanessa Hudgens and Ashley Tisdale
- "High School Never Ends" by Bowling for Soup
- "High School Nights" by Dave Edmunds
- "High School Party (Girl)" by Bo Burnham
- "High School U.S.A." by Tommy Facenda
- "Homework" by Otis Rush
- "Hora do Recreio" by Xuxa
- "Horror Highschoool" by Zombina and the Skeletones
- "Hot for Teacher" by Van Halen
- "Hurra Hurra Die Schule Brennt" by Extrabreit

== I ==
- "I Don't Like Mondays" by The Boomtown Rats
- "I Don't Wanna Be Learned" by Ramones
- "I Don't Wanna Go to School" by The Naked Brothers Band
- "I Go to School" by Charles Bronson
- "(I Hate) School Rules" by Exciter
- "I Was a High School Psychopath" by Screeching Weasel
- "I Hate My School" by The Necros
- "I Hate My School" by Red Cross
- "I Hate the Homecoming Queen" by Emily Osment
- "I Hated School" by The Wretched Ones
- "I Love College" by Asher Roth
- "I Love the College Girls" by Harry Reser
- "I Love You Period" by Dan Baird
- "Imaturo" by Jão
- "I Want Out" by Helloween
- "I Wish" by Stevie Wonder
- "I Wish I Could Go Back to College" from the musical Avenue Q
- "If U C Jordan" by Something Corporate
- "I'm Not Gonna Cry" by Corey Smith
- "I'm Not Okay (I Promise)" by My Chemical Romance
- "In My High School" by Blaine Larsen
- "In School" by Die Kreuzen
- "Institutionalized" - Suicidal Tendencies
- "Itchycoo Park" by The Small Faces
- "It's a Sin" by Pet Shop Boys

== J ==
- "The Janitor Knows" by Those Darn Accordions
- "Jennifer Eccles" by The Hollies
- "Jeremy" by Pearl Jam
- "Jack the Idiot Dunce" by The Kinks
- "Jock-o-Rama" by Dead Kennedys
- "Judas" by Antje Duvekot
- "Just Sixteen" by Velvet Revolver

== K ==
- "The Kids" by Eminem
- "Kids Don't Do It" by Bo Diddley
- "Kindergarten" by Faith No More
- "Klassenfahrt" by K.I.Z
- "Kodachrome" by Paul Simon
- K-12 album by Melanie Martinez

== L ==
- "The Last Assembly" by The Kinks
- "Life Sentence" by Dead Kennedys
- "Little Things" by Good Charlotte
- "The Logical Song" by Supertramp
- "Looking for an Echo" by Kenny Vance and The Planotones
- "Long Live" by Taylor Swift
- "Loser" by 3 Doors Down
- "Losers (Feat. Labrinth)" by The Weeknd
- "Lost One's Weeping" by Neru
- "Long Gone Long" by The Rainmakers

== M ==
- "Mad World" by Tears for Fears
- "Make a Difference" by Linda Davis
- "Mayor of Simpleton" by XTC
- "Mark Me Absent" by The Clash
- "Mass Nerder" by The Descendents
- "Me and Julio Down by the Schoolyard" by Paul Simon
- "Measuring Cups" by Andrew Bird
- "Meine Bildung hab' ich aus dem Fernsehen" by Lucilectric
- "Mmm Mmm Mmm Mmm" by Crash Test Dummies
- "Moments to Remember" by The Four Lads
- "Mr. Lee" by The Bobbettes
- "Mr. School Psychology" by The Devotchkas
- "Mr. Watson" by Ke$ha
- "Mrs. Blaileen" by Primus
- "Mutha (Don't Wanna Go to School Today)" by Extreme
- "My New School" by Neil Innes
- "My Old School" by Steely Dan
- "My School" by Galactic Cowboys
- "My Yearbook" by Gene Summers

== N ==
- "Nazi School" by Cracked Actor
- "Never Miss a Beat" by Kaiser Chiefs
- "The New Girl in School" by Jan and Dean
- "New Kid in School" by The Donnas
- "NecroHigh" by Nekromantix
- "Nie mehr Schule" by Falco
- "Newport Living" by Cute Is What We Aim For
- "Never Give Up" by Bang Yong Guk and Zelo
- "Next Semester" by Twenty One Pilots
- "No Such Thing" by John Mayer
- "No Surrender" by Bruce Springsteen

== O ==
- "O Caderno" by Toquinho
- "Oh Baby Doll" by Chuck Berry
- "Olympia (Rock Star)" by Hole
- "One Angry Dwarf and 200 Solemn Faces" by Ben Folds Five
- "One of the Few" by Pink Floyd
- "Out of School" by JFA
- "Only the Good Die Young" by Billy Joel

== P ==
- "Paper Chase" by The Academy Is...
- "Piss Aaron" by Todd Rundgren
- "Pizza Day!" by The Aquabats
- "Play It Cool, Stay in School" by Brenda Holloway and The Supremes
- "Playground" by XTC
- "Popular" by Nada Surf
- "Popular Creeps" by Chris Mars
- "Principal's Office" by Young M.C.
- "Professor Bop" by Babs Gonzales
- "Professor de Música" by Xuxa, Gabriel o Pensador and Tiago Mocotó
- "Public Highschool" by The Necros
- "Public School" by Tech N9ne
- "Punk Rock Academy" by Atom and His Package
- "Put It Out for Good" by Amy Ray
- "Preskool Dropout" by The F.U.'s

== R ==
- "Rat Race" by The Specials
- "Rejects" by 5 Seconds of Summer
- "(Remember the Days of the) Old Schoolyard" by Cat Stevens
- "Revelation" by D12
- "Rock 'n' Roll High School" by Ramones
- "Rock Star" by Hole

== S ==
- "Sad Semester" by Twothirtyeight
- "Sadie Hawkins Dance" by Relient K
- "Sakura no Ki ni Narō" by AKB48
- "Sakura no Shiori" by AKB48
- "School" by Apathy
- "School" by The Auteurs
- "School" by Nirvana
- "School" by Supertramp
- "School II" by Scared Straight
- "School Day" (also known as "School Days (Ring Ring Goes the Bell)") by Chuck Berry
- "School Days" by Big L
- "School Days" by Byron G. Harlan
- "School Days" by Guardians 4
- "School Days" by The Runaways from the album Waitin' for the Night
- "School Daze" by W.A.S.P. from the album W.A.S.P.
- "School Girl" by the Five Royales
- "School Is In" by the Josie Cotton
- "School Is Out" and its sequel "School Is In" by Gary U.S. Bonds
- "School of Rock" by Jack Black
- "School of Rock 'n Roll" by Gene Summers, also covered by The Polecats
- "School on Fire" by Greta
- "School Song" by Danny Elfman
- "School Song" from Matilda
- "School Spirit" by Kanye West
- "School Teacher" by Bob Seger
- "School Uniforms" by The Wombats
- "School's Out" by Alice Cooper
- "School's Out" by Krokus from the album Change of Address
- "School's In" by J-Live from the album Always Has Been
- "Schoolboy Crush" by Cliff Richard
- "Schoolboy Heart" by Jimmy Buffett
- "Schooldays" by The Kinks
- "Schoolgirl" by Kim Wilde
- "Schoolgirl" by Steve Forbert
- "Schoolyard Crush" by Ever We Fall
- "Schoolmam" by The Stranglers
- "Shimmy" by System of a Down
- "Show and Tell" by Relient K
- "Sister Christian" by Night Ranger
- "Sister Mary Elephant (Shudd-Up!)" by Cheech and Chong
- "Sixth Form Girls" by Saxon
- "Skipping School" by Chris Mars
- "Skool Daze" by Venom
- "Slipping Through My Fingers" by ABBA
- "Smells Like Teen Spirit" by Nirvana
- "Smokin' In the Boys Room" by Brownsville Station, also covered by Mötley Crüe
- "Starfish and Coffee" by Prince
- "Sophomore Slump or Comeback of the Year" by Fall Out Boy
- "STAT-60" by MC Lars
- "Status Back Baby" by Frank Zappa
- "Stay Free" by The Clash
- "Still in School" by NRBQ
- "Stole" by Kelly Rowland
- "Story of My Life" by Social Distortion
- "Straight A's" by Dead Kennedys
- "Strange Arithmetic" by The Coup
- "Street Life" – Roxy Music
- "Student Demonstration Time" by The Beach Boys
- "Suckerpunch" by Five Iron Frenzy
- "Subdivisions" by Rush
- "Summer of '69" by Bryan Adams, also covered by Bowling for Soup
- "Swingin' School" by Bobby Rydell
- "Sylvie" by Saint Etienne
- "Stand Up, Sit Down, Shut Your Mouth" by Simon Crum

== T ==
- "Teacher" by Jethro Tull from the album Benefit
- "The Teacher" by Big Country from the album The Seer
- "The Teacher" by Super Furry Animals
- "Teacher, I Need You" by Elton John
- "Teacher, Teacher!" by Jinjer
- "Teacher, Teacher" by .38 Special
- "Teacher, Teacher" by Rockpile
- "Teacher Teacher" by AKB48
- "Teacher's Pet" by Doris Day
- "Teacher's Pet by Venom
- "Teenagers" by My Chemical Romance
- "Teen-Age Crush" by Tommy Sands
- "Teenage Dirtbag" by Wheatus
- "Teenage Life" by Daz Sampson
- "Terminal Preppie" by Dead Kennedys
- "They Schools" by Dead Prez
- "This Isn't Hogwarts" by Hank Green
- "This Is What Makes Us Girls" by Lana Del Rey
- "This Must Be the Place I Waited Years to Leave" by Pet Shop Boys
- "Thunder Road" by Bruce Springsteen
- "To Sir, with Love" by Lulu
- "Triple Sweetness" by Lolly Talk
- "Troublemaker" by Weezer

== U ==
- "Underclass Hero" by Sum 41
- "Up Against the Wall" by Tom Robinson Band

== V ==
- "Violent School" by The Dead Milkmen
- "Vai male a scuola" by Marco Masini
- "Vill ha dej" by Freestyle

== W ==
- "Waiting in School" by Ricky Nelson
- "Walmart Parking Lot" by Chris Cagle
- "Walk This Way" by Aerosmith, also covered by Run-D.M.C.
- "We Rule the School" by Belle and Sebastian
- "Where Dreams Go To Die" by The Downtown Fiction
- "We're Gonna Be Friends" by The White Stripes, also covered by Jack Johnson
- "What Did You Learn in School Today?" by Tom Paxton
- "What I Go to School For" by Busted
- "What I Go to School For" by Jonas Brothers
- "Wonderful World" by Sam Cooke, also covered by Herman's Hermits and Simon & Garfunkel with James Taylor
- "When I Kissed the Teacher" by ABBA
- "When I Write My Master's Thesis" by John K. Samson
- "Word Crimes" by "Weird Al" Yankovic
- "Working Class Hero" by John Lennon

== Y ==
- "You Can't Blame the Youth" by Peter Tosh
- "You Don't Learn That In School" by Nat King Cole
- "Youth of today" by Musical Youth

== See also ==
- List of television series about school
