= Doraemon's Long Tales =

Japanese manga series

大長編ドラえもん (Daichōhen Doraemon)
- Genre: Action-adventure, Drama
- Manga
- Written by: Fujiko Fujio (Vol. 1-8); Fujiko F. Fujio (Vol. 8–17); Fujiko Pro (Vol. 18–24)
- Published by: Shogakukan
- Imprint: Tentōmushi Comics
- Magazine: CoroCoro Comic
- Original run: January 1980 – March 2004
- Volumes: 24

- Doraemon's Movie Stories

映画ストーリー ドラえもん (Eiga sutōrī Doraemon)
- Genre: Action-adventure, Drama
- Created by: Fujiko F. Fujio
- Manga

Doraemon's Movie Stories
- Written by: Yasunori Okada, Yuichi Shinbo (Vol. 1–3); Shintaro Mugiwara (Vol. 4–7)
- Published by: Shogakukan
- Imprint: Tentōmushi Comics
- Magazine: CoroCoro Comic
- Original run: March 2007 – March 2020
- Volumes: 7
- icon

Doraemon's Long Tales (Japanese: 大長編ドラえもん, Hepburn: Daichōhen Doraemon), also known as Doraemon's Long Stories, is a manga series based on Fujiko F. Fujio's Doraemon. As the name suggests, Doraemon's Long Tales features whole volumes of longer and continuous narratives about Doraemon, Nobita and friends on their adventures into various lands of science fiction and fantasy, unlike the regular Doraemon series which is merely compilations ("volumes") of various self-contained shorts.

The series was published in CoroCoro Comic magazine. The first 16 volumes were originally illustrated by Fujiko F. Fujio himself. After his death in 1996, the remaining volumes were written and illustrated by Shintaro Mugiwara and Yasunori Okada. The last eight volumes have the company's name on their covers instead of his name.

The series was adapted to a line of Doraemon films and various remakes, released in Japan cinemas between 1980 and 2004, and back into a separate manga series with screenshots taken from the films. The first 17 were released digitally on Amazon Kindle in color, translated in English for the North American market, on December 27, 2017.

Doraemon: The Record of Nobita's Parallel Visit to the West is the only movie from the 1979 series to lack its own manga version, due to series creator Fujiko F. Fujio falling ill.

Along with the above series, a second series called Doraemon's Movie Stories (映画ストーリー ドラえもん, Eiga sutōrī Doraemon) based on the 2005 series movies was also produced, however the majority of movies in the 2005 series lack their own manga versions. Most of the adaptations are original stories from the 2005 series. There is also a manga volume based on the DS version of Nobita's Dinosaur 2006.

The manga from both series have at least slight differences from the movies that adapt them.

== List of chapters ==
=== Doraemon's Long Tales ===
VOL	No	Title	Release Time		Times		Note
VOL	No	Title	Time	Total	All	F All	Note
1	-	Nobita's Dinosaur	January–March 1980	3	1	1	Pen name was "Fujiko Fujio" (Works drawn by Fujimoto alone, not by a duo)
2	-	Nobita's Record of Spaceblazer	September 1980 – February 1981	6	1	1	
3	-	Nobita and the Haunts of Evil	September 1981 – February 1982	6	1	1	
4	-	Nobita and the Castle of the Undersea Devil	August 1982 – February 1983	7	1	2	The title of the first half of the series was Nobita's Undersea Castle (のび太の海底城)
5	-	Nobita's Great Adventure into the Underworld	September 1983 – February 1984	6	1	2	
6	-	Nobita's Little Star Wars	August 1984 – January 1985	6	2	2	
7	-	Nobita and the Steel Troops	August 1985 – January 1986	6	2	3	
8	-	Nobita and the Knights of Dinosaurs	November 1986 – March 1987	5	2	3	
9	-	Nobita and the Birth of Japan	October 1988 – March 1989	6	2	4	Pen name was "Fujiko Fujio F". From this work 6th episode onwards, Pen name is "Fujiko F. Fujio".
10	-	Nobita and the Animal Planet	October – March 1990	6	2	4	
11	-	Nobita's Dorabian Nights	September 1990 – February 1991	6	2	4	
12	-	Nobita and the Kingdom of Clouds	October 1991 – March 1992; Doraemon Club number 2 (1 May 1994)	4 (+2); 1	3	5	Due to the illness of the author, the publication was paused in January. The publication continued in February and March under Fujiko Pro. With publication of the script of final volume by Doraemon Club
13	-	Nobita and the Tin Labyrinth	September 1992 – March 1993 (January spause)	6	3	5	
14	-	Nobita's Three Visionary Swordsmen	September 1993 – March 1994 (January spause)	6	3	5	
15	-	Nobita's Diary of the Creation of the World	September 1994 – March 1995 (December spause)	6	3	6	
16	-	Nobita and the Galaxy Super-express	September 1995 – February 1996	6	3	6	
17	-	Nobita and the Spiral City	September 1996 – March 1997 (November spause)	6	3	6	Fujimoto was involved until the 3rd episode. From the 4th episode onwards, Shinichi Hagiwara (Fujiko Pro) drew the manga based on Fujimoto's concept notes.
18	1	Nobita's Great Adventure in the South Sea	October 1997 – March 1998	6	4	-	Shinichi Hagiwara (Fujiko Pro) drew the volume
19	2	Nobita Drifts in the Universe	October 1998 – March 1999	6	4	-	Shinichi Hagiwara (Fujiko Pro) drew the volume
20	3	Nobita and the Legend of the Sun King	October 1999 – March 2000	6	4	-	Fujiko Pro drew the volume (Actually drew it was Shinichi Hagiwara)
21	4	Nobita and the Winged Braves	February – March 2001	2	4	-	Yasunori Okada (Fujiko Pro) draw the Volume
22	5	Nobita in the Robot Kingdom	February – March 2002	2	4	-	Yasunori Okada (Fujiko Pro) draw the Volume
23	6	Nobita and the Windmasters	February – March 2003	2	4	-	Yasunori Okada (Fujiko Pro) draw the Volume
24	7	Nobita in the Wan-Nyan Spacetime Odyssey	February – March 2004	2	4	-	Yasunori Okada draw the Volume (Independent from Fujiko Pro)

=== Doraemon's Original Comics ===
Volume	Title	Release date	Note
1	Nobita's Dinosaur 2006 DS	10 March 2006	Manga adaptation to the 2006 DS game.

=== Doraemon's Movie Stories ===
Volume	Title	Release date	Note
1	Nobita's New Great Adventure into the Underworld ~The 7 Magic Users~	10 March 2007	Only remake movie to get its own manga edition.
2	Nobita and the Green Giant Legend	8 March 2008	
3	Nobita Great Battle of the Mermaid King	6 March 2010	
4	Nobita and the Island of Miracles—Animal Adventure	30 March 2012	
5	Nobita Secret Gadget Museum	30 March 2013	
6	Nobita's Space Heroes	28 April 2015	
7	Nobita's New Dinosaur	25 March 2020	

=== North American Amazon Kindle Color Releases (English) ===
#	Title	Release date	ISBN
1	Noby's Dinosaur	27 December 2017	ASIN B078NN4SBV
2	Noby the Spaceblazer	27 December 2017	ASIN B078NDX9QH
3	Noby's Uncharted World	27 December 2017	ASIN B078NDXH2P
4	Noby in Devilfish Castle	27 December 2017	ASIN B078NMJSDC
5	Noby and the Devildoom Chronicles	27 December 2017	ASIN B078NNNJB8
6	Noby's Little Space War	27 December 2017	ASIN B078NMX81B
7	Noby vs. the Mecha Army	27 December 2017	ASIN B078NPC78D
8	Noby and the Dino Knights	27 December 2017	ASIN B078NPP3MV
9	Noby's Stone Age Japan	27 December 2017	ASIN B078NM3NSK
10	Noby's Storybook Planet	27 December 2017	ASIN B078NMHLKT
11	Noby's Dorabian Nights	27 December 2017	ASIN B078NR4GKS
12	Noby's Kingdom in the Clouds	27 December 2017	ASIN B078NN41Y4
13	Noby and the Tin Toy Labyrinth	27 December 2017	ASIN B078NNGHWR
14	Noby's Phantastic Swordsmen	27 December 2017	ASIN B078NPYB69
15	Noby, Creator of Worlds	27 December 2017	ASIN B078NPY8P5
16	Noby's Galactic Express	27 December 2017	ASIN B078NDXLTJ
17	Noby's Wind-up City	27 December 2017	ASIN B078NPB9Z8
