= School =

Institution for the education of students by teachers

Public school No.2 in Krasnoturyinsk, Russia

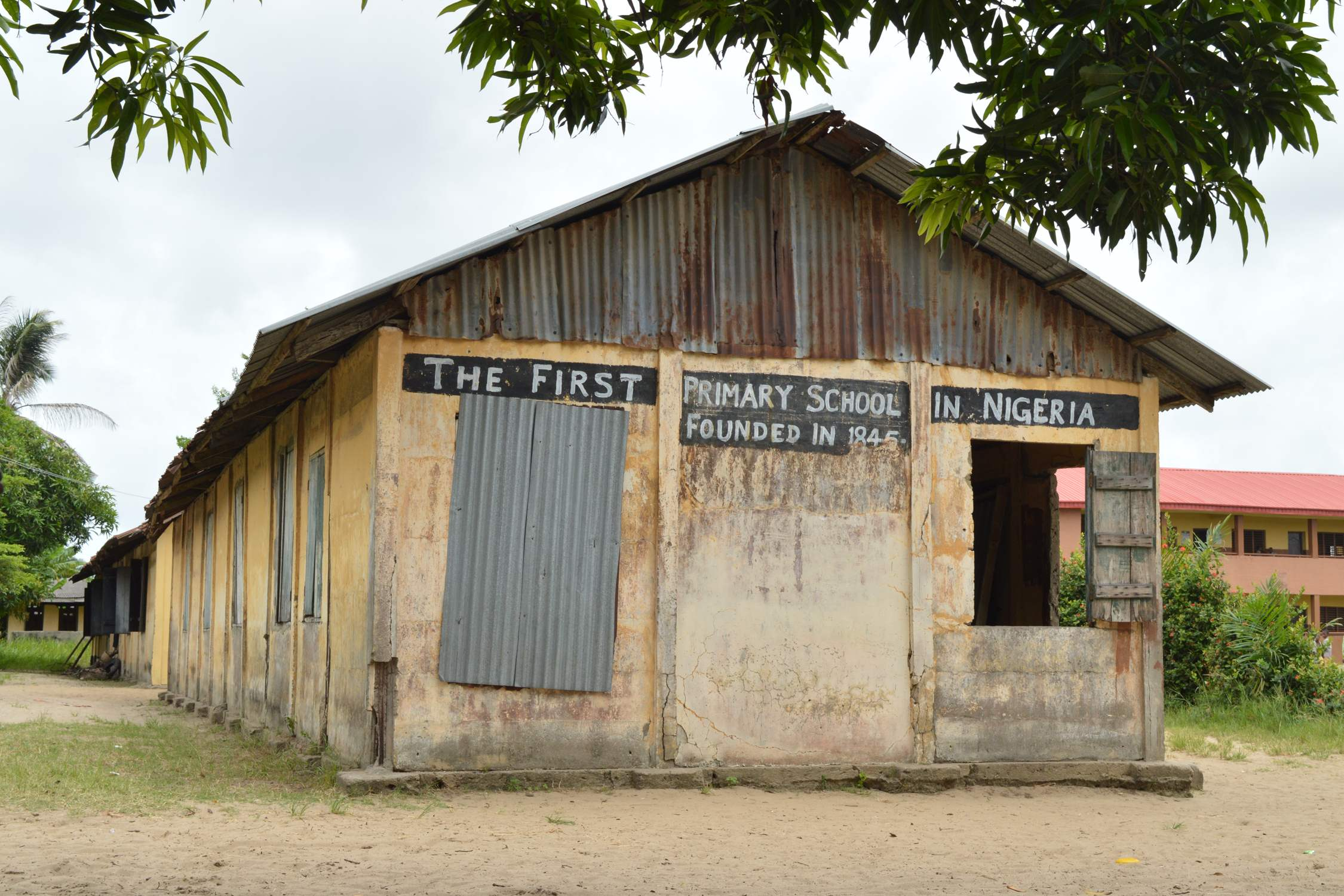
First primary school in Nigeria, built in 1845

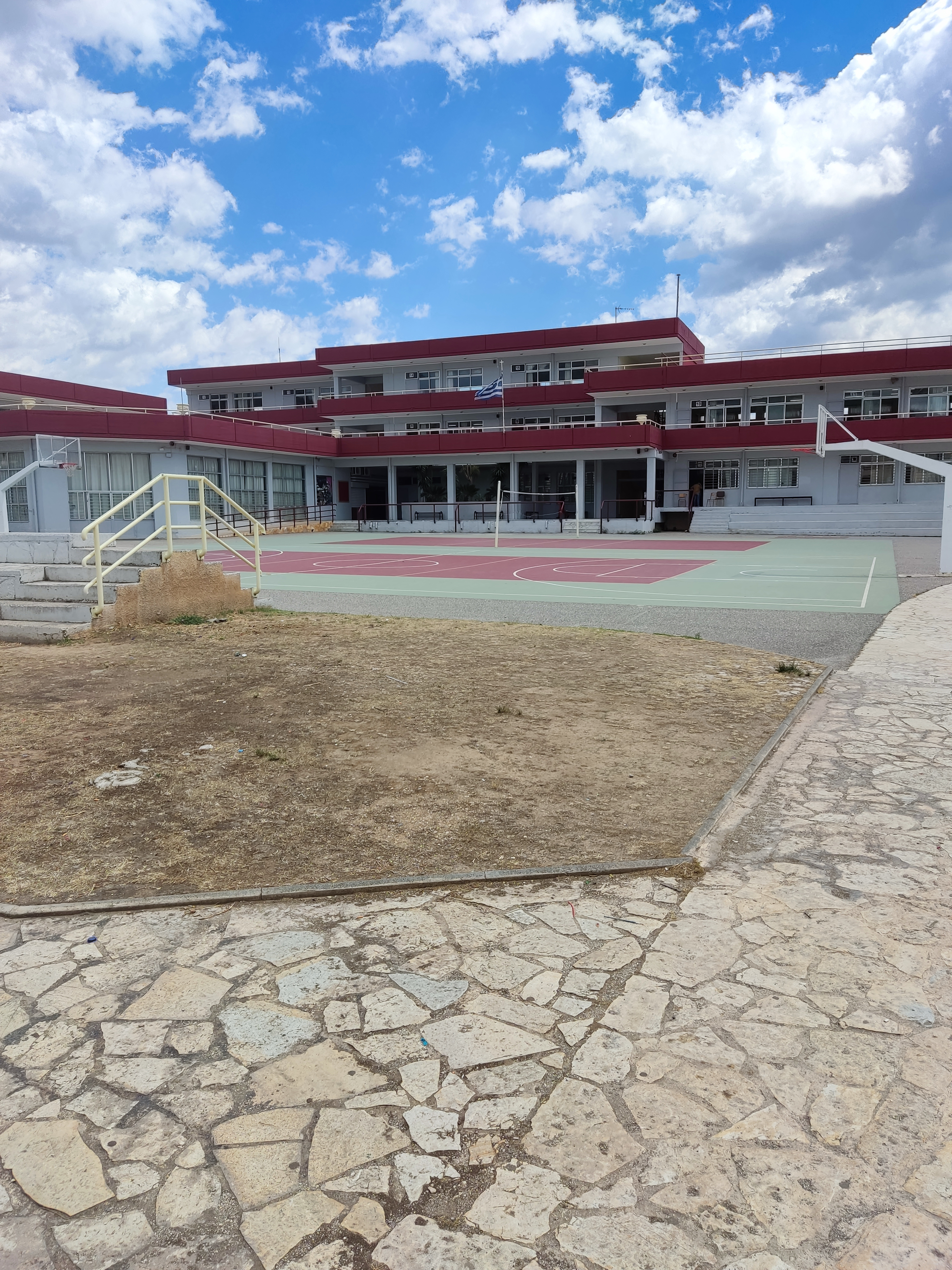
A high school building in Argos, Greece

A school is an educational institution (and, in the case of in-person learning, the building) designed to provide learning environments for the teaching of students, usually under the direction of teachers. Most countries have systems of formal education, which is sometimes compulsory. In these systems, students progress through a series of schools that can be built and operated by both government and private organizations. The names for these schools vary by country (discussed in the Regional terms section below) but generally include primary school for young children and secondary school for teenagers who have completed primary education. An institution where higher education is taught is commonly called a university college or university.

In addition to these core schools, students in a given country may also attend schools before and after primary and secondary education. Kindergarten or preschool provide some schooling to very young children (typically ages 3–5). University, vocational school, college, or seminary may be available after secondary school. A school may be dedicated to one particular field, such as a school of economics or dance. Alternative schools may provide nontraditional curriculum and methods.

Non-government schools, also known as private schools, may be required when the government does not supply adequate or specific educational needs. Other private schools can also be religious, such as Christian schools, gurukula (Hindu schools), madrasa (Arabic schools), hawzas (Shi'i Muslim schools), yeshivas (Jewish schools), and others; or schools that have a higher standard of education or seek to foster other personal achievements. Schools for adults include institutions of corporate training, military education and training, and business schools.

Proponents of schools see them as effective means of education, while critics of schools often accuse the school system of failing to adequately prepare students for their future lives, of encouraging certain temperaments while inhibiting others, of prescribing students exactly what to do, how, when, where and with whom, which would suppress creativity, and of using extrinsic measures such as grades and homework, which would inhibit children's natural curiosity and desire to learn.

In homeschooling and distance education, teaching and learning take place independently of the institution of school or in a virtual school outside a traditional school building, respectively. Schools are organized in several different organizational models, including departmental, small learning communities, academies, integrated, and schools-within-a-school.

== Etymology ==
The word school derives from Greek σχολή (scholē), originally meaning "leisure" and "that in which leisure is employed," but later evolving to mean "a group to whom lectures were given."

== History and development ==
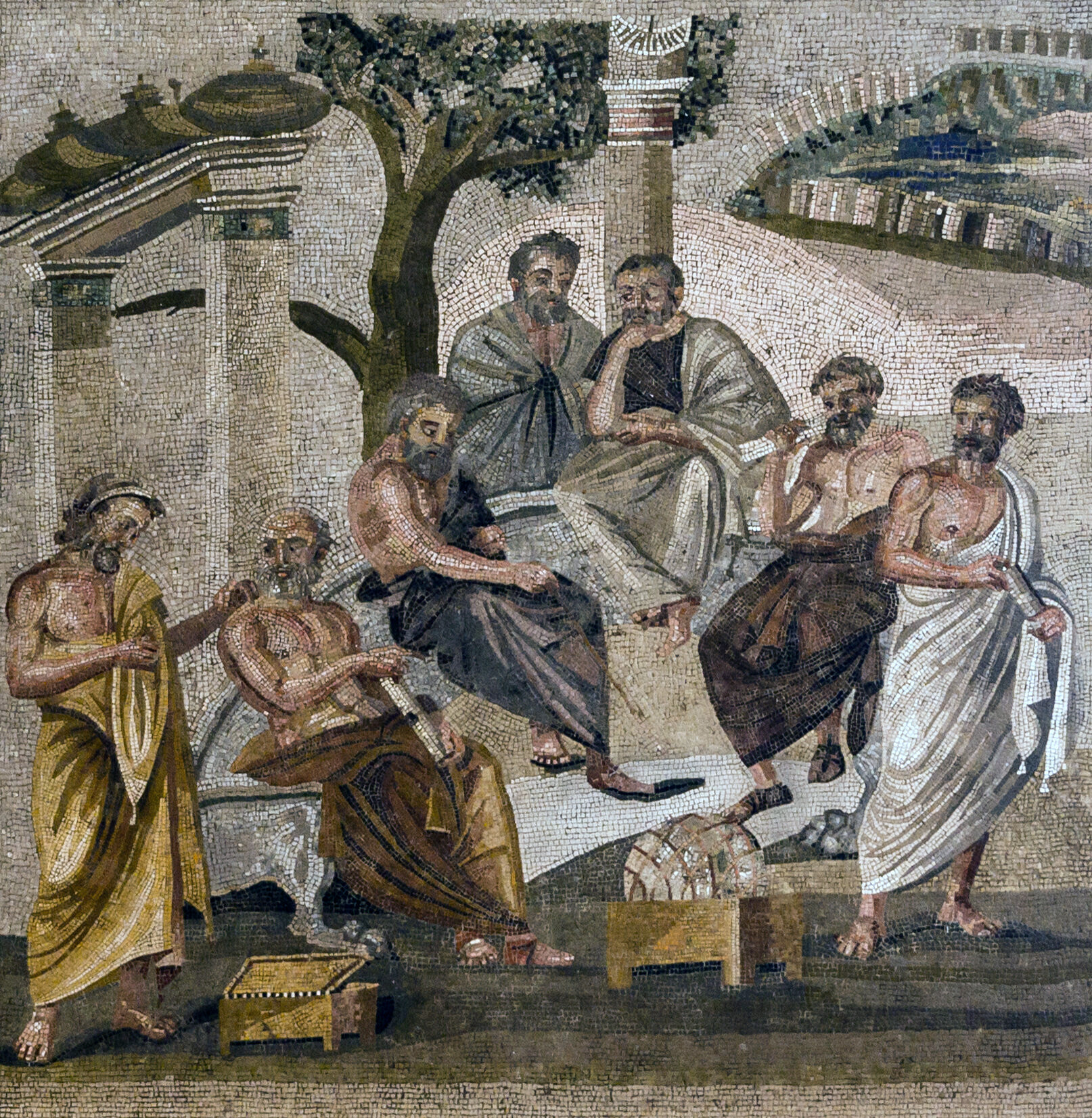
Plato's academy, mosaic from Pompeii

The concept of grouping students together in a centralized location for learning has existed since classical antiquity. Formal schools have existed at least since ancient Greece (see Platonic Academy), ancient Rome (see Education in Ancient Rome) ancient India (see Gurukul), and ancient China (see History of education in China). The Byzantine Empire had an established schooling system beginning at the primary level. According to Traditions and Encounters, the primary education system began in 425 AD, and "... military personnel usually had at least a primary education ...". The Empire's large, somewhat efficient government necessitated the maintenance of an educated citizenry. Although Byzantium lost much of the grandeur of Roman culture and extravagance in the process of surviving, the Empire emphasized efficiency in its war manuals. The Byzantine education system continued until the empire's collapse in 1453 AD.

In Western Europe, a considerable number of cathedral schools were founded during the Early Middle Ages in order to teach future clergy and administrators, with the oldest still existing and continuously operated cathedral schools being The King's School, Canterbury (established 597 CE), King's School, Rochester (established 604 CE), St Peter's School, York (established 627 CE) and Thetford Grammar School (established 631 CE). Beginning in the 5th century CE, monastic schools were also established throughout Western Europe, teaching religious and secular subjects.

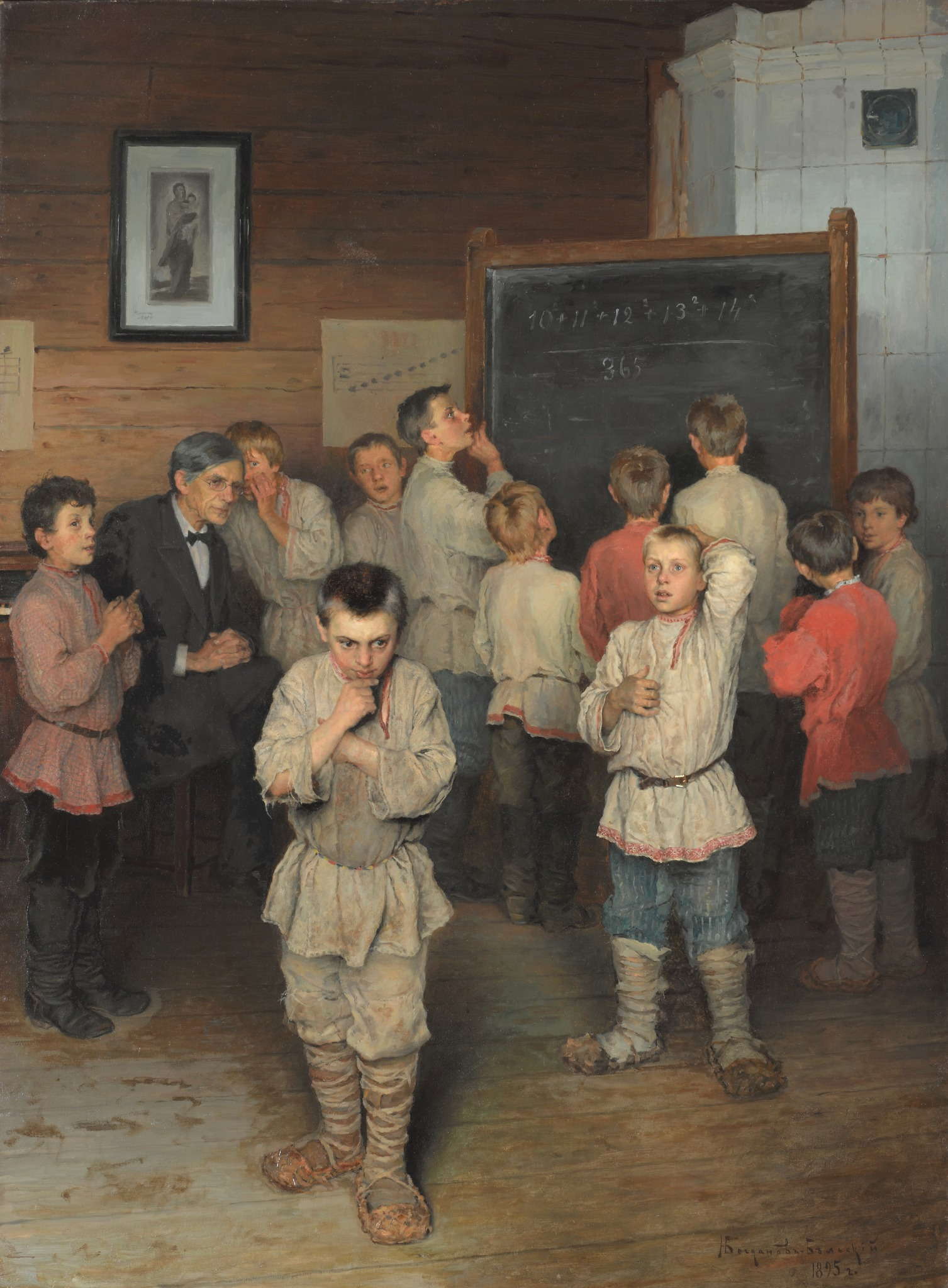
Mental calculations. In the school of S. Rachinsky by Nikolay Bogdanov-Belsky. Russia, 1895.

In Europe, universities emerged during the 12th century; here, scholasticism was an important tool, and the academicians were called schoolmen. During the Middle Ages and much of the Early Modern period, the main purpose of schools (as opposed to universities) was to teach the Latin language. This led to the term "grammar school," which in the United States informally refers to a primary or elementary school, but in the United Kingdom means a school that selects entrants based on ability or aptitude. The school curriculum has gradually broadened to include literacy in the vernacular language and technical, artistic, scientific, and practical subjects.

Obligatory school attendance became common in parts of Europe during the 18th century. In Denmark-Norway, this was introduced as early as in 1739–1741, the primary end being to increase the literacy of the almue, i.e., the "regular people". Many of the earlier public schools in the United States and elsewhere were one-room schools where a single teacher taught seven grades of boys and girls in the same classroom. Beginning in the 1920s, one-room schools were consolidated into multiple classroom facilities with transportation increasingly provided by kid hacks and school buses.

The Islamic world also developed school systems in the modern sense of the word. Emphasis was put on knowledge, which required a systematic way of teaching and spreading knowledge and purpose-built structures. At first, mosques combined religious performance and learning activities. However, by the 9th century, the madrassa—an institution independent from any mosque—was introduced when Fatima al-Fihriya founded al-Qarawiyyin in 859 CE. They were also the first to make the Madrassa system a public domain under Caliph's control.

Under the Ottoman Empire, the towns of Bursa and Edirne became the main centers of learning for the empire. The Ottoman system of Külliye revolutionized the education system, making learning accessible to a broader public through its free meals, health care, and sometimes free accommodation.

== Regional terms ==
The term "school" varies by country, as do the names of the various levels of education within the country.

=== United Kingdom and Commonwealth of Nations ===
In the United Kingdom, the term school refers primarily to pre-university institutions; these can generally be divided into pre-schools or nursery schools, primary schools (sometimes further divided into infant school and junior school), and secondary schools. Various types of secondary schools in England and Wales include grammar schools, comprehensives, secondary moderns, and city academies. While they may have different names in Scotland, there is only one type of secondary school. They may be funded either by the state or independently funded. Scotland's school performance is monitored by Education Scotland. Ofsted reports on performance in England and Estyn reports on performance in Wales.

In the United Kingdom, most schools are publicly funded and known as state schools or maintained schools; these schools do not charge tuition fees. There are also private schools that charge fees. Some of the most selective and expensive private schools are known as public schools, a usage that can be confusing to speakers of North American English. In North American usage, a public school is publicly funded or run.

In much of the Commonwealth of Nations, including Australia, New Zealand, India, Pakistan, Bangladesh, Sri Lanka, South Africa, Kenya, and Tanzania, the term school refers primarily to pre-university institutions.

=== India ===
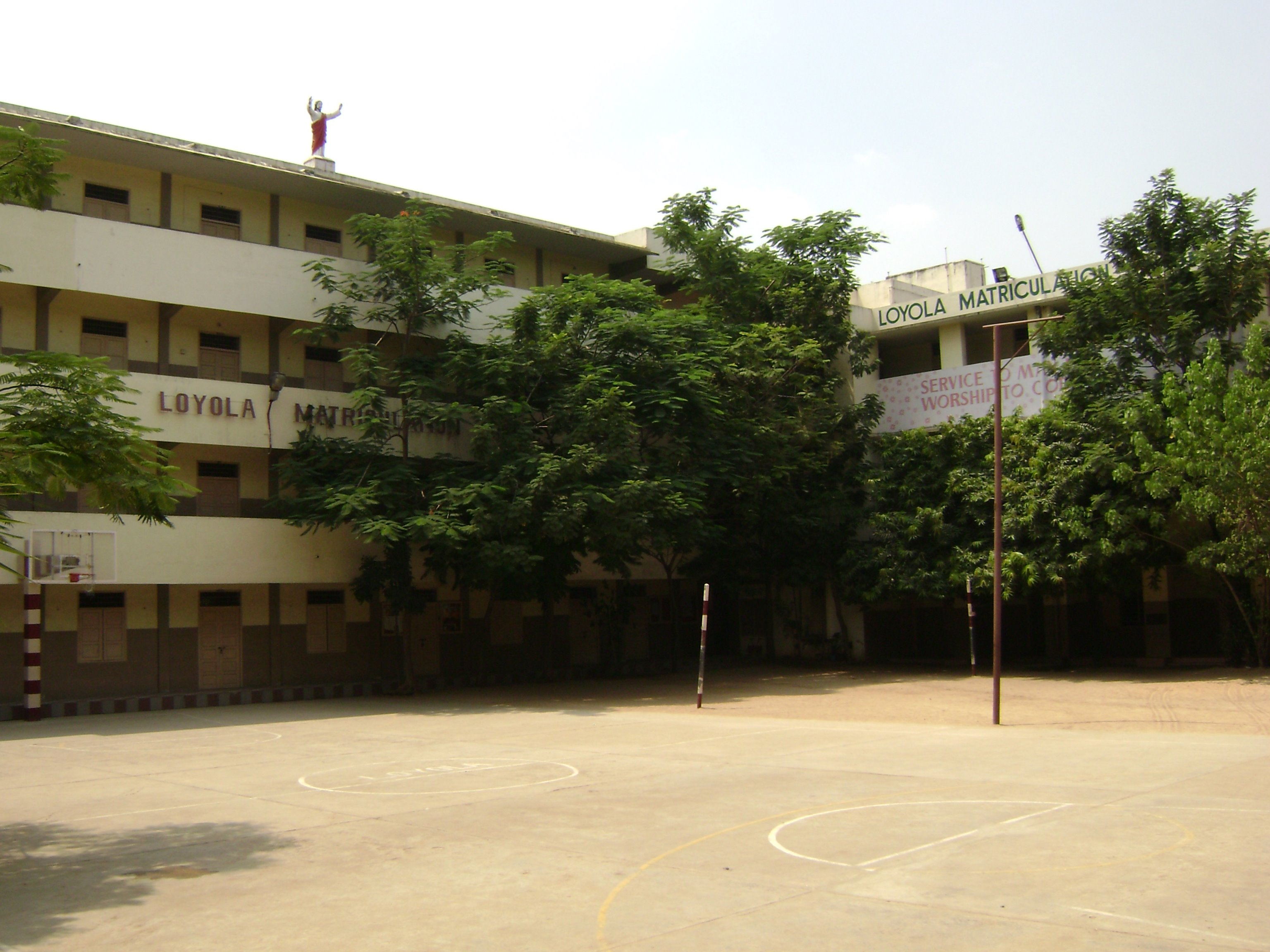
Loyola School, Chennai, India – run by the Catholic Diocese of Madras. Christian missionaries played a pivotal role in establishing modern schools in India.

In ancient India, schools were in the form of gurukuls, traditional Hindu residential learning sites, typically within a teacher's house or a monastery. Schools today are commonly known by the Sanskrit terms Vidyashram, Vidyalayam, Vidya Mandir, orVidya Bhavan in India. In southern languages, schools are called pallikoodam or paada saalai. During Mughal rule, madrasahs were introduced in India to educate the children of Muslim parents.

British records show that indigenous education was widespread in the 18th century, with a school for every temple, mosque, or village in most regions. The subjects taught included reading, writing, arithmetic, theology, law, astronomy, metaphysics, ethics, medical science, and religion.

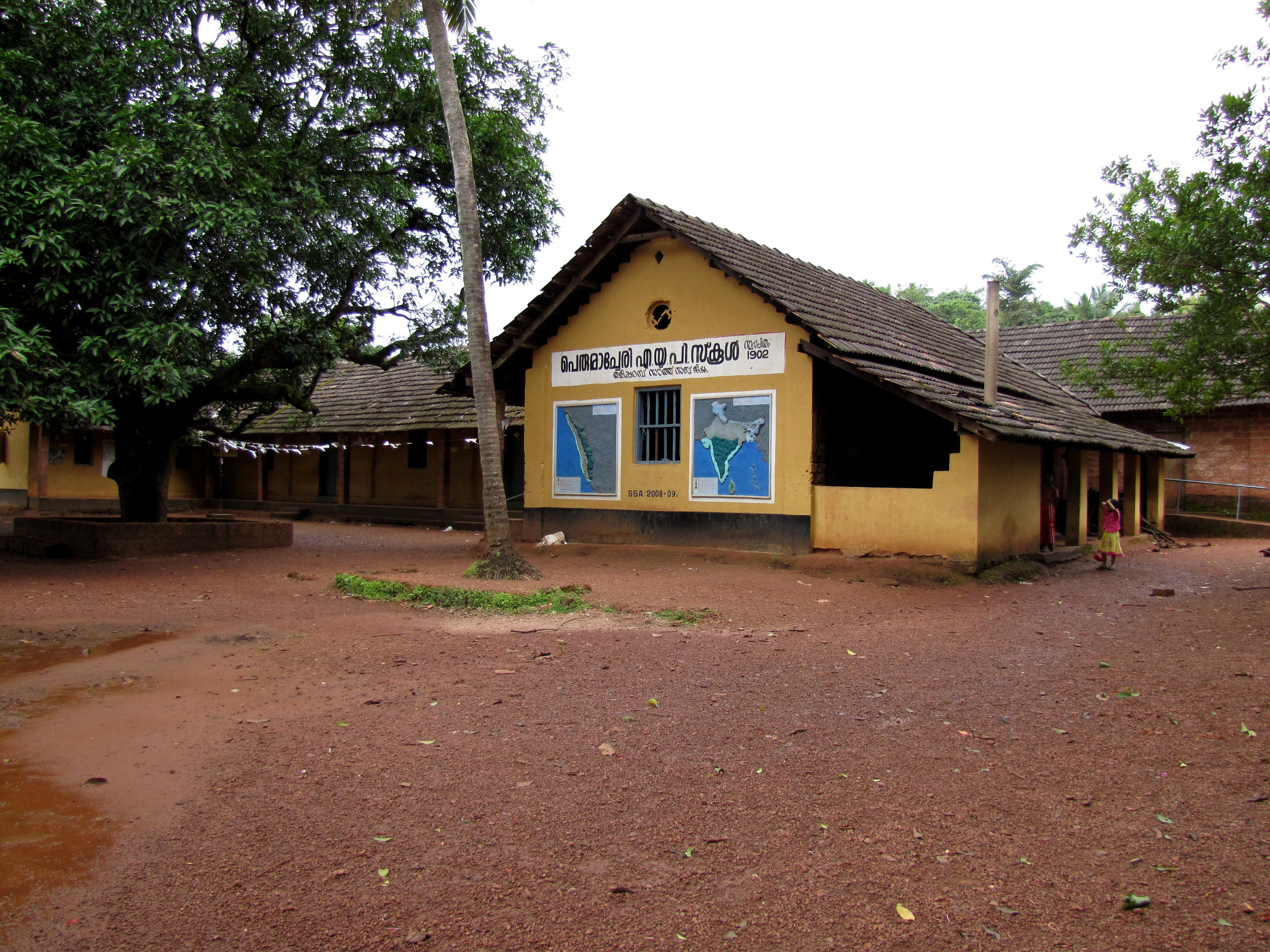
A school building in Kannur, India

Under British rule, Christian missionaries from England, the United States, and other countries established missionary and boarding schools in India. These schools marked the beginning of modern schooling in India. Their syllabui and calendar became the foundation for schools in modern India. Today most schools follow the missionary school model of tutoring, subject matter, and governance, with minor changes.

Schools in India range from large, high-tuition campuses with thousands of students to free schools where children are taught under a tree. There are several boards of schools in India, including the Central Board for Secondary Education (CBSE), the Council for the Indian School Certificate Examinations (CISCE), the Anglo Indian Board, and the Madrasa Boards, Matriculation Boards, and State Boards of various states. The typical Indian school teaches language(s), mathematics, science (physics, chemistry, biology), geography, history, general knowledge, and information technology/computer science. Extracurricular activities include physical education/sports and cultural activities such as music, choreography, painting, and theatre/drama.

=== Germany ===
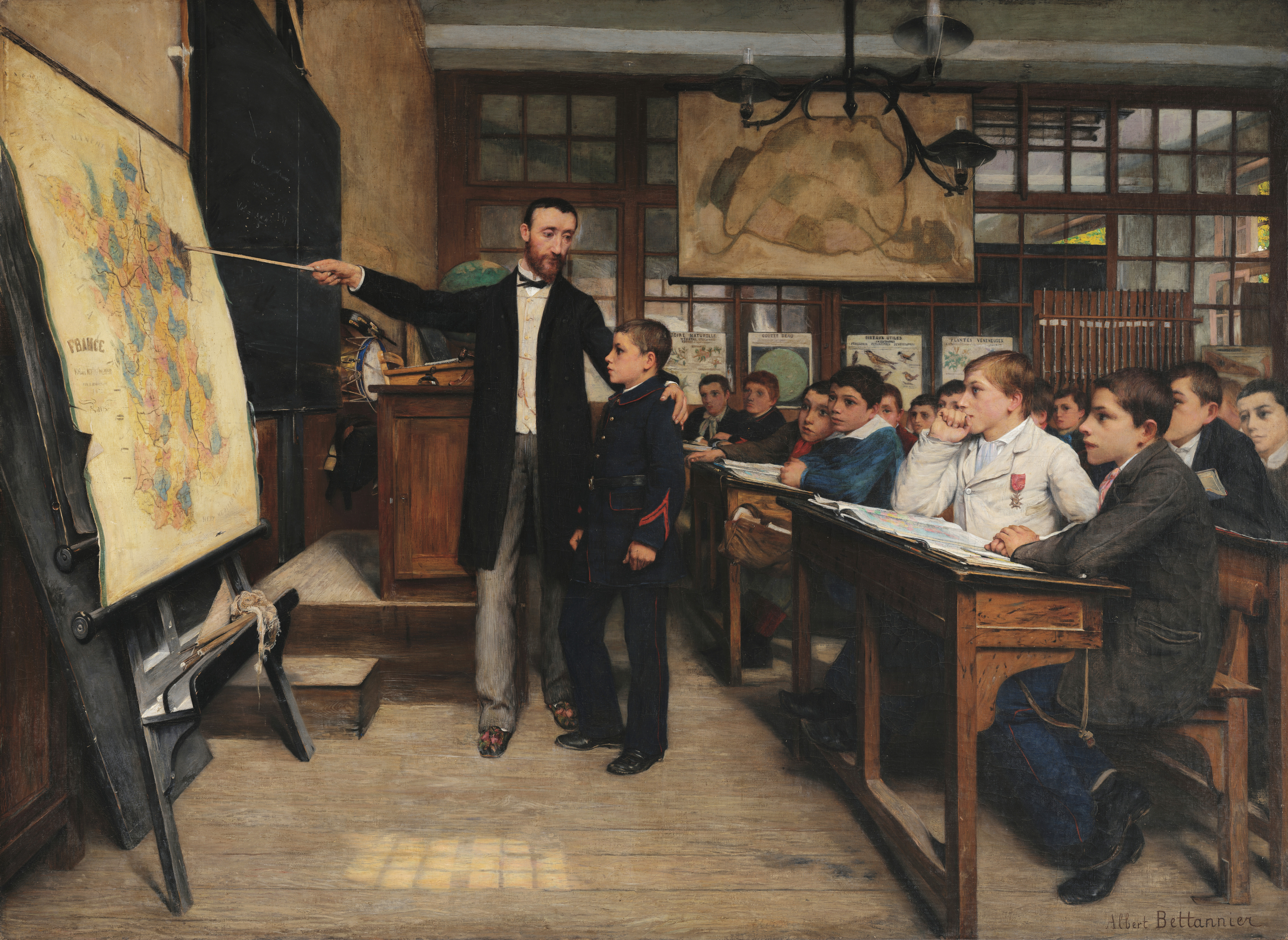
Albert Bettannier's 1887 painting La Tache noire depicts a child being taught about the "lost" province of Alsace-Lorraine in the aftermath of the Franco-Prussian War – an example of how European schools were often used in order to inoculate Nationalism in their pupils.

In Germany and much of continental Europe, the term school usually applies to primary education, with primary schools that last between four and nine years, depending on the country. It also applies to secondary education, with secondary schools often divided between Gymnasiums and vocational schools, which educate students for between three and six years depending on country and type of school. In Germany, students graduating from Grundschule are not allowed to progress into a vocational school directly. Instead, they are supposed to proceed to one of Germany's general education schools such as Gesamtschule, Hauptschule, Realschule or Gymnasium. When they leave that school, which usually happens at age 15–19, they may proceed to a vocational school. The term school is rarely used for tertiary education, except for some upper or high schools (German: Hochschule), which describe colleges and universities.

In Eastern Europe modern schools (after World War II), of both primary and secondary educations, often are combined. In contrast, secondary education might be classified as accomplished or unaccomplished. The schools are classified as middle schools of general education. For the technical purposes, they include "degrees" of the education they provide out of three available: the first – primary, the second – unaccomplished secondary, and the third – accomplished secondary. Usually, the first two degrees of education (eight years) are always included. In contrast, the last one (two years) permits the students to pursue vocational or specialized educations.

=== North America and the United States ===
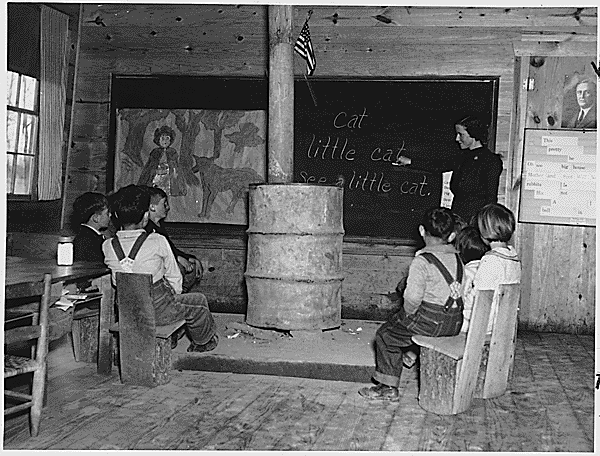
One-room school in 1935, Alabama

In North America, the term school can refer to any educational institution at any level and covers all of the following: preschool (for toddlers), kindergarten, elementary school, middle school (also called intermediate school or junior high school, depending on specific age groups and geographic region), high school (or in some cases senior high school), college, university, and graduate school.

In the United States, school performance through high school is monitored by each state's department of education. Charter schools are publicly funded elementary or secondary schools that have been freed from some of the rules, regulations, and statutes that apply to traditional public schools. The terms grammar school and grade school are sometimes used to refer to a primary school due to British colonial legacies. In addition, public magnet schools offer programs and instructional models not available in typical schools.

=== Africa ===
In West Africa, "school" can also refer to "bush" schools, Quranic schools, or apprenticeships. These schools include formal and informal learning.

Bush schools are training camps that pass down cultural skills, traditions, and knowledge to their students. Bush schools are semi-similar to traditional western schools because they are separated from the larger community. These schools are located in forests outside of the towns and villages, and the space used is solely for these schools. Once the students have arrived in the forest, they cannot leave until their training is complete. Visitors are prohibited from these areas.

Instead of being separated by age, Bush schools are separated by gender. Women and girls cannot enter the boys' bush school territory and vice versa. Boys receive training in cultural crafts, fighting, hunting, and community laws among other subjects. Girls are trained in their own version of the boys' bush school. They practice domestic affairs such as cooking, childcare, and being a good wife. Their training is focused on how to be a proper woman by societal standards.

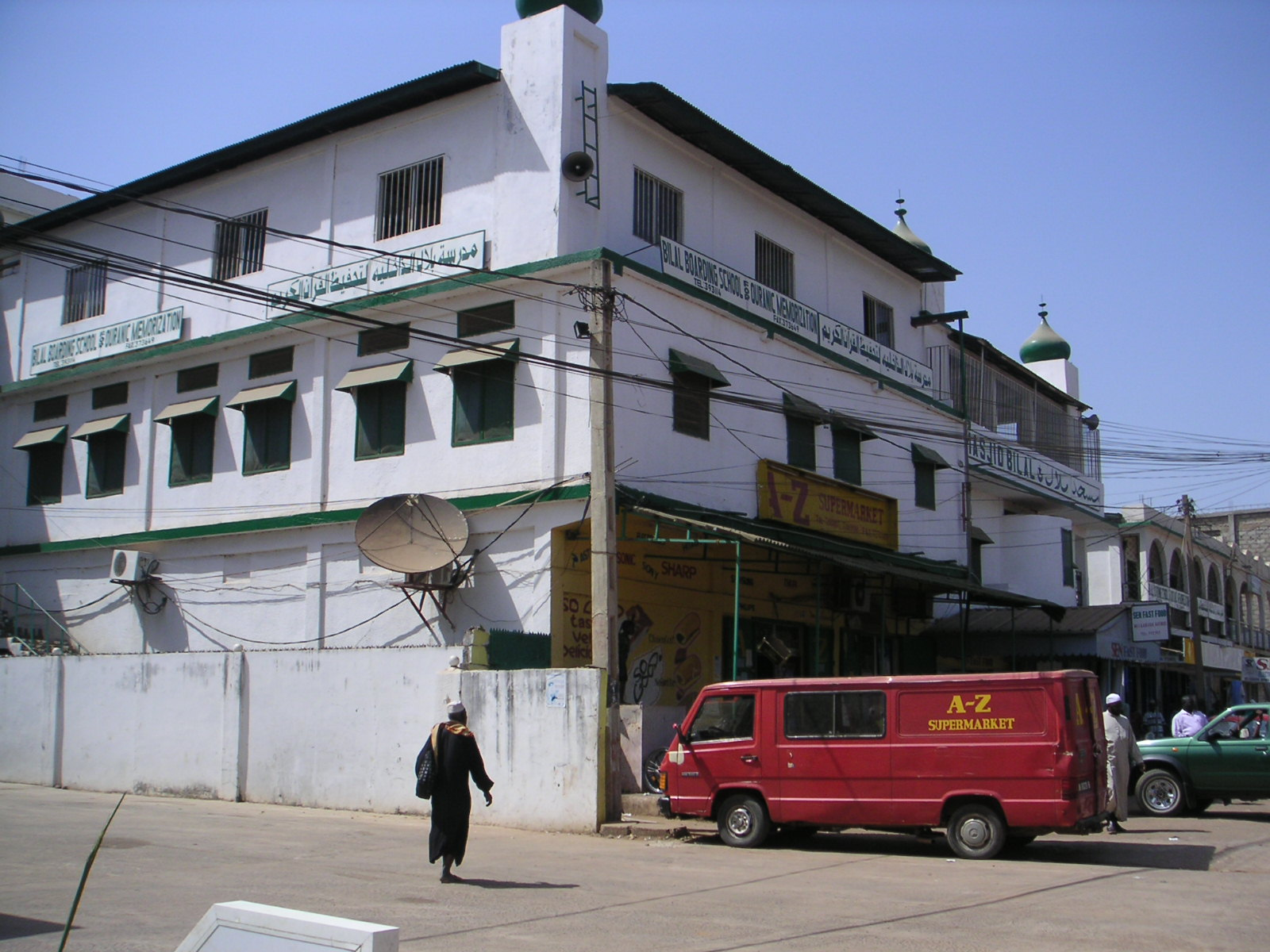
A madrasah in the Gambia

Qur'anic schools are the principal way of teaching the Quran and knowledge of the Islamic faith. These schools also fostered literacy and writing during the time of colonization. Today, the emphasis is on the different levels of reading, memorizing, and reciting the Quran. Attending a Qur'anic school is how children become recognized members of the Islamic faith. Children often attend state schools and a Qur'anic school.

In Mozambique, specifically, there are two kinds of Qur'anic schools. They are the tariqa based and the Wahhabi-based schools. What makes these schools different is who controls them. Tariqa schools are controlled at the local level. In contrast, the Wahhabi are controlled by the Islamic Council. Within the Qur'anic school system, there are levels of education. They range from a basic level of understanding, called chuo and kioni in local languages, to the most advanced, which is called ilimu.

In Nigeria, the term school broadly covers daycares, nursery schools, primary schools, secondary schools and tertiary institutions. Primary and secondary schools are either privately funded by religious institutions and corporate organisations or government-funded. Government-funded schools are commonly referred to as public schools. Students spend six years in primary school, three years in junior secondary school, and three years in senior secondary school. The first nine years of formal schooling is compulsory under the Universal Basic Education Program (UBEC). Tertiary institutions include public and private universities, polytechnics, and colleges of education. Universities can be funded by the federal government, state governments, religious institutions, or individuals and organisations.

== Ownership and operation ==
Many schools are owned or funded by states. Private schools operate independently from the government. Private schools usually rely on fees from families whose children attend the school for funding; however, sometimes such schools also receive government support (for example, through School vouchers). Many private schools are affiliated with a particular religion; these are known as parochial schools.

=== Online schools and classes ===
Some schools offer remote access to their classes over the internet. Online schools also can provide support to traditional schools, as in the case of the School Net Namibia. Some online classes also provide experience in a class. When people take them, they have already been introduced to the subject and know what to expect. Classes provide high school/college credit, allowing students to take the classes at their own pace. Many online classes cost money to take, but some are offered free.

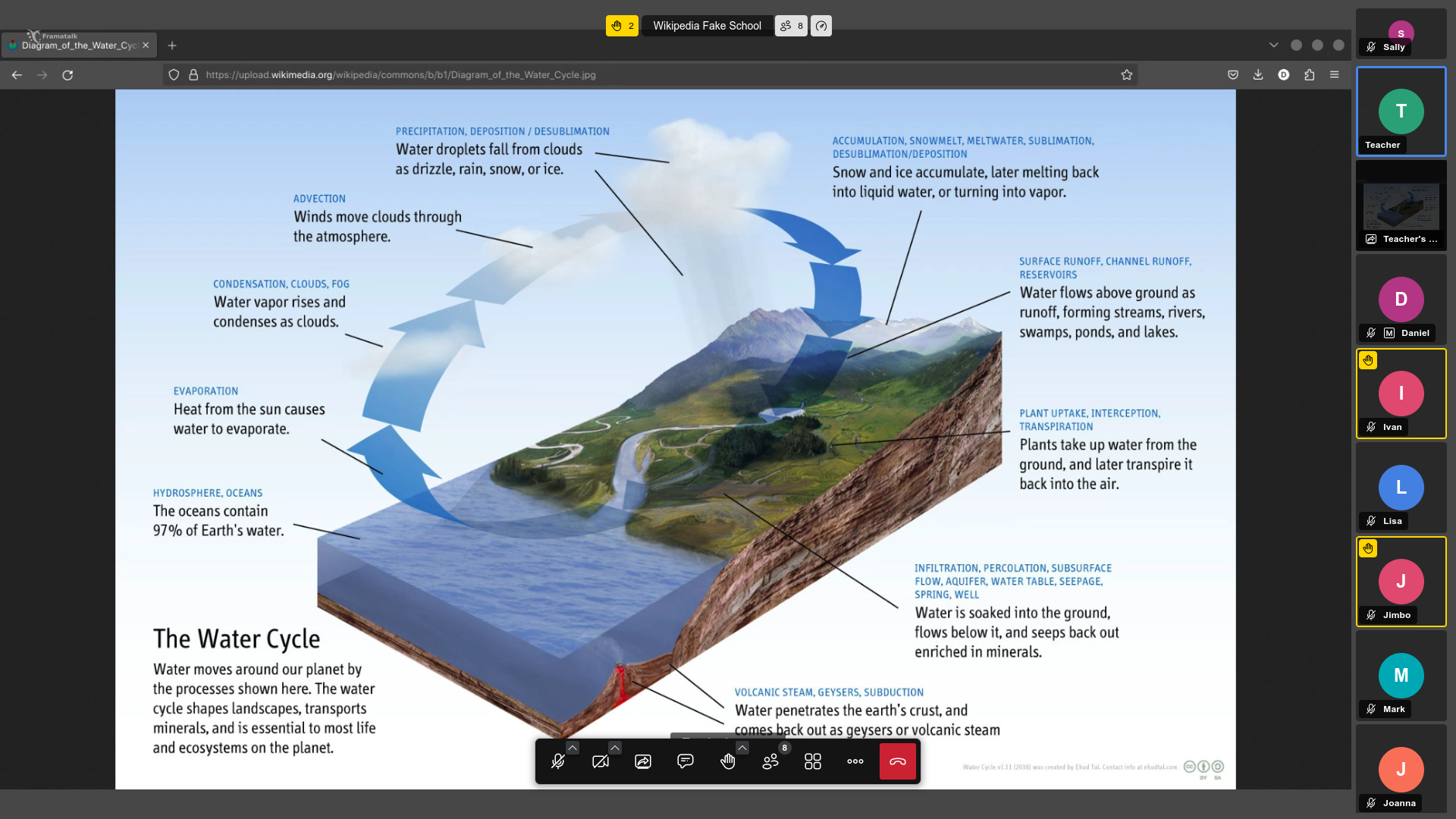
A staged example of an online classroom using Jitsi. The teacher is sharing their screen.

Internet-based distance learning programs are offered widely through many universities. Instructors teach through online activities and assignments. Online classes are taught the same as in-person, with the same curriculum. The instructor offers the syllabus with their fixed requirements like any other class. Students can virtually turn their assignments in to their instructors according to deadlines. This being through via email or on the course webpage. This allows students to work at their own pace yet meet the correct deadlines. Students taking an online class have more flexibility in their schedules to take their classes at a time that works best.

Conflicts with taking an online class may include not being face to face with the instructor when learning or being in an environment with other students. Online classes can also make understanding the content challenging, especially when unable to get in quick contact with the instructor. Online students have the advantage of using other online sources with assignments or exams for that specific class. Online classes also have the advantage of students not needing to leave their house for a morning class or worrying about their attendance for that class. Students can work at their own pace to learn and achieve within that curriculum.

The convenience of learning at home has been an attraction point for enrolling online. Students can attend class anywhere a computer can go – at home, in a library, or while traveling internationally. Online school classes are designed to fit a student's needs while allowing students to continue working and tending to their other obligations. Online school education is divided into three subcategories: Online Elementary School, Online Middle School, Online High school.

== Components of most schools ==
A school entrance building in Australia

Schools are organized spaces purposed for teaching and learning. The classrooms where teachers teach and students learn are of central importance. Classrooms may be specialized for certain subjects, such as laboratory classrooms for science education and workshops for industrial arts education.

Typical schools have many other rooms and areas, which may include:

- Cafeteria (Commons), dining hall or canteen where students eat lunch and often breakfast and snacks.
- Athletic field, playground, gym, or track place where students participating in sports or physical education practice
- Schoolyards, all-purpose playfields typically in elementary schools, often made of concrete.
- Auditorium or hall where student theatrical and musical productions can be staged and where all-school events such as assemblies are held
- Office where the administrative work of the school is done
- Library where students ask librarians reference questions, check out books and magazines, and often use computers
- Computer labs where computer-based work is done and the internet accessed
- Cultural activities where the students uphold their cultural practice through activities like games, dance, and music

=== Architecture ===
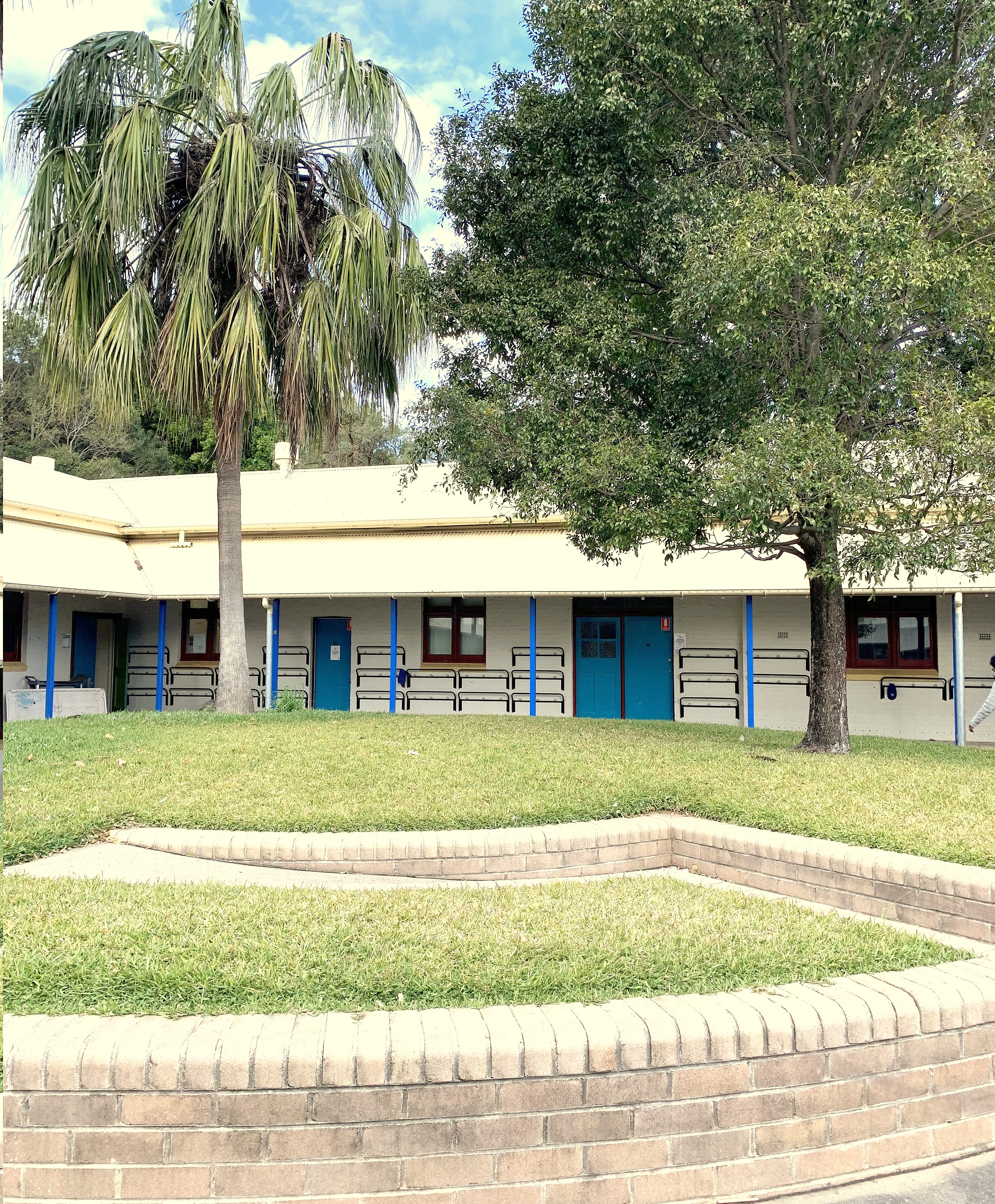
A classroom block with schoolbag racks in Western Sydney, Australia

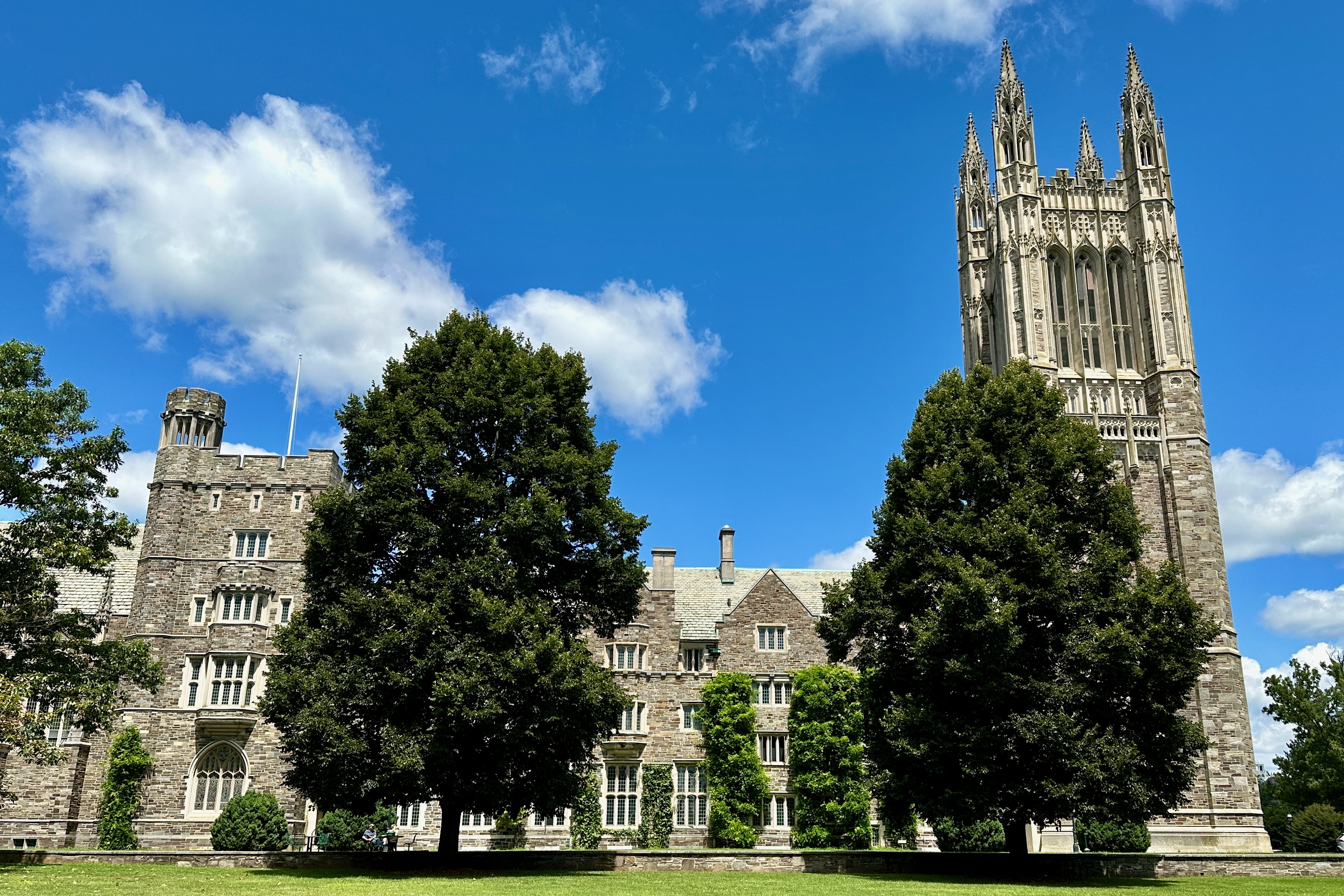
Princeton University Graduate College (1913), designed by Ralph Adams Cram in the Collegiate Gothic style

Educational architecture, also known as school architecture or school building design, is a specialized branch of commercial architecture where the building design is focused on the primary purpose of educational instruction, such as schools and universities, as well as other educational institutions. The design of a building can significantly influence the learning experience of students. Additionally, because schools are important sources of traffic, employment and community activities, school buildings often act as anchor institutions in neighborhoods or communities.

Various countries have gone through significant changes in philosophies associated with educational institutions, influenced by trends in investment by governments as well as larger changes in educational philosophy.

=== Education facilities in low-income countries ===
In low-income countries, only 32% of primary, 43% of lower secondary and 52% of upper secondary schools have access to electricity. This affects access to the internet, which is just 37% in upper secondary schools in low-income countries, as compared to 59% in those in middle-income countries and 93% in those in high-income countries.

Access to basic water, sanitation and hygiene is also far from universal. Among upper secondary schools, only 53% in low-income countries and 84% in middle-income countries have access to basic drinking water. Access to water and sanitation is universal in high-income countries.

== Security ==
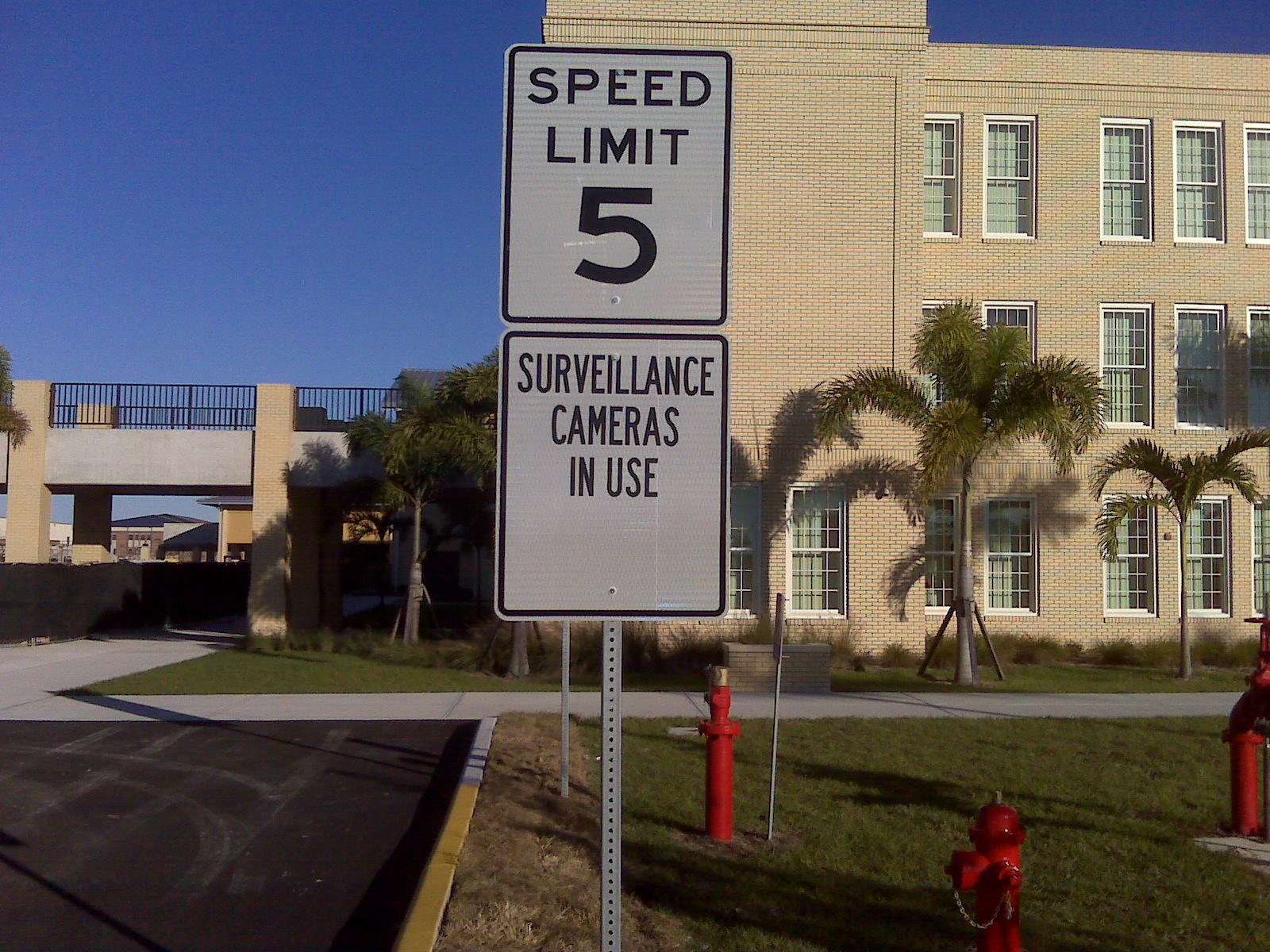
To curtail violence, some schools have added CCTV surveillance cameras. This is especially common in schools with gang activity or violence.

The safety of staff and students is increasingly becoming an issue for school communities in the U.S., an issue most schools are addressing through improved security. Some have also taken measures such as installing metal detectors or video surveillance. Others have even taken measures such as having the children swipe identification cards as they board the school bus. These plans have included door numbering to aid public safety response for some schools.

Other security concerns faced by schools include bomb threats, gangs, and vandalism. In recognition of these threats, the United Nations Sustainable Development Goal 4 advocates for upgrading education facilities to provide a safe, non-violent learning environment.

== Health services ==
School health services are services from medical, teaching and other professionals applied in or out of school to improve the health and well-being of children and, in some cases, whole families. These services have been developed in different ways around the globe. However, the fundamentals are constant: the early detection, correction, prevention, or amelioration of disease, disability, and abuse from which school-aged children can suffer.

== Stress ==
As a profession, teaching has levels of work-related stress (WRS) that are among the highest of any profession in some countries, such as the United Kingdom and the United States. The degree of this problem is becoming increasingly recognized and support systems are being put into place.

Stress sometimes affects students more severely than teachers, up to the point where the students are prescribed stress medication. This stress is claimed to be related to standardized testing, and the pressure on students to score above average.

According to a 2008 mental health study by the Associated Press and mtvU, eight in 10 U.S. college students said they had sometimes or frequently experienced stress in their daily lives. This was an increase of 20% from a survey five years previously. Thirty-four percent had felt depressed at some point in the past three months, 13 percent had been diagnosed with a mental health condition such as an anxiety disorder or depression, and 9 percent had seriously considered suicide.

== Discipline towards students ==
Schools and their teachers have always been under pressure – for instance, pressure to cover the curriculum, perform well compared to other schools, and avoid the stigma of being "soft" or "spoiling" toward students. Forms of discipline, such as control over when students may speak, and normalized behaviour, such as raising a hand to speak, are imposed in the name of greater efficiency. Practitioners of critical pedagogy maintain that such disciplinary measures have no positive effect on student learning. Indeed, some argue that disciplinary practices detract from learning, saying that they undermine students' dignity and sense of self-worth – the latter occupying a more primary role in students' hierarchy of needs.

== Support and criticism ==
Proponents of schools see them as effective means of providing an education for young people. A supportive statement issued by the Catholic Church in the 1960s stated that "among all educational instruments, the school has a special importance. It is designed not only to develop with special care the intellectual faculties but also to form the ability to judge rightly, to hand on the cultural legacy of previous generations, to foster a sense of values, to prepare for professional life".

Scholars found support for open educational resources with curriculum and classroom materials available to the parents.

Anti-schooling activism, or radical education reform, describes positions that are critical of school as a learning institution and/or compulsory schooling laws; or multiple attempts and approaches to fundamentally change the school system. People of this movement usually advocate alternatives to the traditional school system, education independent from school, the absence of the concept of schooling as a whole, or the right that people can choose how, where and with whom they are educated.

These attitudes criticize the learning atmosphere and environment of school and oppose the educational monopoly of school and the conventional standard and practice of schooling for reasons such as:

- regarding the use of compulsory schooling as a tool of assimilation;
- the belief that an overly structured and predetermined learning system can be detrimental for children and would encourage certain temperaments while inhibiting others;
- the related belief that the school environment prevents learning rather than encouraging the innate natural curiosity by using unnatural extrinsic pressures such as grades and homework;
- the view that school prescribes students exactly what to do, how, when, where and with whom, which would suppress creativity,
- and/or the conviction that schooling is used as a form of political or governmental control for the implementation of certain ideologies in the population.

Another very persistent argument of anti-schooling activists is that school does not adequately prepare children for their life outside of school, and that most teachers do not have a neutral and comprehensive view of the world because they have only attended academic institutions a large part of their life.

Others criticize the forced contact in school and are of the opinion that school makes children spend a large part of their most important development phase in a building, in seclusion from society, exclusively with children in their own age group, seated and entrusted with the task of obeying the orders of one authority figure for several hours each day, while almost everything they do is assessed, which would be a dehumanizing experience.

Some may also feel a deep aversion to school based on their personal experiences or question the efficiency and sustainability of school learning and are of the opinion that compulsory schooling represents an impermissible interference with the rights and freedoms of parents and children; and believe that schools as a vehicle for knowledge transfer are no longer necessary and increasingly becoming obsolete in times of rapid information procurement, e.g. via the internet, and therefore generally consider compulsory education with evidence-based learning-oriented online schools or autodidactism to be more sensible than the traditional cohort-based physical schools.

== See also ==
- Bullying in teaching
- Educational technology
- School pedagogy
- Free education
- Lists of colleges and universities by country
- Lists of schools by country
- List of songs about school
- List of television series about school
- Mobile phone use in schools
- Music school
- Secular education
- School bullying
- School meal
- School story
- School uniform
- School-to-prison pipeline
- Military academy
- Student transport
- Teaching for social justice
- University-preparatory school
- Year-round school
- Night school

== Sources ==
This article incorporates text from a free content work. Licensed under CC BY-SA 3.0 IGO. Text taken from #CommitToEducation, 35, UNESCO.
