= Mission Student =

- Created by: Euromedia
- Country of origin: Ukraine
- No. of series: 6 programmes

Production
- Running time: 45 minutes

Original release
- Release: 23 December 2010 – 16 November 2012

Mission Student – Who wants to study in Ukraine? (Azerbaijani: Məqsəd Tələbə - Kim Ukraynada təhsil almaq istəyir?, Kazakh: Миссиям Студент - Украинада оқығыңыз келе ме?) is a Ukrainian educational and entertainment TV show. Created by the Ukrainian Ministry of Education and Science for 10-11 grade students from Kazakhstan and Azerbaijan, the main prize of the show is a grant for higher education in Ukraine.

The show was filmed in Ukraine and broadcast via TV channels in Kazakhstan, Azerbaijan, and Georgia in 2010 - 2012.

== Format ==
The form of the show was designed and developed by Ukrainian company Euromedia together with channels АТВ in Azerbaijan as well as Khabar Agency and Bilim in Kazakhstan.

The TV show is supported by the Ministry of Education and Science, Youth and Sport in Ukraine, the Ministry of Youth and Sport in Azerbaijani Republic and Azerbaijan Youth Foundation under the Ministry of Youth and Sport in Azerbaijan as well as in Kazakhstan under the Republican Public Association «Unified children and youth organization “Жас Ұлан”.

The idea of the show appeared as a source of popularization of education in Ukraine and was designed as a unique form to combine intellectual game and entertaining show.

The filming of the show took place in five universities of Ukraine the participants visited in the first season of the project, among them: Taras Shevchenko National University of Kyiv, National Aviation University, Kharkiv National Karazin University, Odessa National Polytechnic University, Poltava National Technical Yuriy Kondratyuk University. The filming within the studio took place in one of Kyiv TV pavilions.

== TV show links ==
- Ukrinform, 10.11.2012 – “Azerbaijani and Kazakh pupils participate in a Tv show to win the right to study in Ukraine”
- Higher education, 14.11.2012 – «Ukrainian education – a bridge between Europe and Asia».
- Educational Poprtal, 16.11.2012 – «International educational and entertaining TV show ««Mission Student – Who wants to study in Ukraine?» takes a start».
- Kharkiv National Karazin University, 01.11.2012 – ««Mission Student – Who wants to study in Ukraine?» filming».
- Nagolos, 24.09.2012 – «There are no losers in intellectual competitions».
- Telekritika, 13.11.2012 – «Euromedia films a quiz about education in Ukraine for Kazakh and Azerbaijani».
- Medianiania, 07.11.2012 – «Украинада оқығыңыз келе ме?».
- Mediabusiness, 15.11.2012 – «About Euromedia filmed «Mission Student – Who wants to study in Ukraine?».
- Dusia, 12.11.2012 – “Show for the smart from Azerbaijan and Kazakhstan filmed under Ukrainian state order”.
- Aleksandr Cheban blogБлог, 16.11.2012 – “ Azerbaijani pupils met S. Vakarchuk. Photos”.
- Sviatoslav Vakarchuk blog, 08.11.2012 – “Azerbaijani pupils met Vakarchuk. Photos”.
