= Hurra, hurra, die Schule brennt =

German punk rock song

- Original release cover

Single by Extrabreit
- B-side: "Flieger, grüß mir die Sonne"
- Released: 1981
- Genre: NDW
- Songwriters: Schlasse, Klein, Hönig, Larson, Möller

"Hurra, hurra, die Schule brennt" (English: "Hooray, Hooray, the School Is Burning") is a song originally recorded by German band Extrabreit in 1980 and remixed in 1990. The title of the song is derived from the 1969 West German film Hurra, die Schule brennt!.

== Track listing ==
Original release

A-side
No.	Title	Length
1.	"Hurra, hurra, die Schule brennt"	2:36

B-side
No.	Title	Length
1.	"Flieger, grüß mir die Sonne"	2:52

== Charts ==
=== Weekly charts ===
Chart (1982)	Peak position
West Germany (GfK)	12

=== Year-end charts ===
Chart (1982)	Position
West Germany (Official German Charts)	31

== 1990 remix ==
"Hurra, hurra, die Schule brennt"
- 90 Remix cover

Single by Extrabreit
- Released: 1990
- Genre: NDW
- Songwriters: Schlasse, Klein, Hönig, Larson, Möller

90 Remix
No.	Title	Length
1.	"Hurra, hurra, die Schule brennt (refreshed version '90)"	2:40
2.	"Hurra, hurra, die Schule brennt (original version)"	2:35
3.	"Der Präsident ist tot"	6:19
4.	"Hurra, hurra, die Schule brennt (Saturday-Night Disco live version)"	2:38
5.	"Polizisten (remix '90)"	6:45

== Busted version ==
"Hurra, hurra, die Schule brennt"
- CD1 cover

Single by Busted

from the album Busted (German edition)
- B-side: "You Said No"; "Last Summer"; "Sleeping with the Light On"; "Year Three School Said No"
- Released: 21 April 2003
- Length: 3:35
- Label: Universal, MCA
- Songwriters: Schlasse, Klein, Hönig, Larson, Möller
- Producer: Steve Robson

Busted singles chronology
"You Said No" (2003)	"Hurra, hurra, die Schule brennt" (2003)	"Sleeping with the Light On" (2003)

"Hurra, hurra, die Schule brennt"
- CD2 cover

In 2003, the song was covered by English pop punk band Busted, who released it as a single in continental Europe as an alternative to the British and Irish-only release "Sleeping with the Light On". It was included on the German edition of their debut album, Busted. The Busted version rewrites the verses in English, but keeps the chorus in German. The song was only ever intended for release in Germany, Austria and Switzerland, but its video and the track subsequently appeared as B-sides to the CD2 and cassette releases of "Crashed the Wedding" respectively, after fans demanded it be released in the United Kingdom. The song has since been released in the UK as a digital download.

=== Track listings ===
CD1

1. "Hurra, hurra, die Schule brennt" - 3:35
2. "You Said No" - 2:47 (clean version)
3. "Last Summer" - 3:05
4. "Hurra, hurra, die Schule brennt" (video) - 3:35

CD2

1. "Hurra, hurra, die Schule brennt" - 3:35
2. "Sleeping with the Light On" (new version) - 3:14
3. "Year Three School Said No" (medley) - 5:18
4. "Sleeping with the Light On" (live video) - 3:40

Cassette

1. "Hurra, hurra, die Schule brennt" - 3:35
2. "You Said No" (live version) - 3:18

=== Chart performance ===
Chart (2003)	Peak position
Austria (Ö3 Austria Top 40)	20
Germany (GfK)	19
Switzerland (Schweizer Hitparade)	34
