= List of romance anime =

This is a list of romantic anime television series, films, and OVAs. While not all inclusive, this list contains numerous works that are representative of the genre. For accuracy of the list, the most common English usage is followed by Japanese name and romaji version. The column for year represents the first premiere of the work, in the case of series the year of the first release.

English name	Japanese name	Type	Year	Regions
1001 Nights	Senya Ichiya Monogatari	Movie	1969	JA
5 Centimeters per Second	Byōsoku Go Senchimētoru	Movie	2007	JA/EN
9 Love Stories	Ai Monogatari: 9 Love Stories	OVA	1993	JA
1st Sorcerous Stabber Orphen		TV	1998	JA/EN
A Bridge to the Starry Skies	Hoshizora e Kakaru Hashi	TV	2011	JA
A Dark Rabbit Has Seven Lives	Itsuka Tenma no Kuro Usagi	TV	2011	JA
A Town Where You Live	Kimi no Iru Machi	TV	2013	JA
A Whisker Away	Nakitai Watashi wa Neko wo Kaburu	Movie	2020	JA
Adventures of the Little Mermaid	Ningyo Hime Marina no Bouken	TV	1991	JA
Aesthetica of a Rogue Hero	Hagure Yūsha no Esutetika	TV	2012	JA/EN
Air		TV	2005	JA/EN
Aishiteruze Baby	Aishiteruze Beibe	TV	2004	JA
Ai Yori Aoshi		TV	2002	JA/EN
Ai Yori Aoshi Enishi		TV	2003	JA/EN
Akane Maniax	Kimi ga Nozomu Eien Gaiden	OVA	2004	JA
Amagami SS		TV	2010	JA
Amagami SS+		TV	2012	JA
Andersen's Children's Story: The Mermaid Princess	Andersen Douwa - Ningyo Hime	Movie	1975	JA
Angel Tales	Tenshi no Shippo	TV	2001	JA
Ano Ko ni 1000%		OVA	1989	JA
Aquarian Age: Sign for Evolution		TV	2002	JA
Aquarion Evol		TV	2012	JA/EN
Arakawa Under the Bridge		TV	2010	JA
Aria the Scarlet Ammo	Hidan no Aria	TV	2011	JA/EN
As The Moon, So Beautiful	Tsukigakirei	TV	2017	JA/EN
Ashita no Nadja		TV	2003	JA
Ask Dr. Rin!		TV	2001	JA
Azuki-chan		TV	1995	JA
Belladonna of Sadness	Kanashimi no Belladonna	Movie	1973	JA
Beloved Angel Angelique	Koi suru Tenshi Angelique	TV	2006	JA
Beyond the Boundary	Kyoukai no Kanata	TV	2013	JA
Blue Spring Ride	Ao Haru Ride	TV	2014	JA
Bobby's In Deep		Movie	1985	JA/EN
Boys Be		TV	2000	JA/EN
Boys Over Flowers	Hana Yori Dango	TV	1996	JA/EN
Brighter Than the Dawning Blue	Yoake Mae Yori Ruri Iro Na -Crescent Love-	TV	2006	JA
Brothers Conflict		TV	2013	JA/EN
Bronze: Zetsuai Since 1989		OVA	1996	JA
Candy Candy		TV	1976	JA
Cardcaptor Sakura	Kādokyaputā Sakura	TV	1998	JA/EN
Ceres: Celestial Legend	Ayashi no Ceres	TV	2000	JA/EN
Charlotte (anime)	Charlotte	TV	2015	JA/EN
Chibi Vampire	Karin	TV	2005	JA/EN
Chobits		TV	2002	JA/EN
Clannad		TV	2007	JA/EN
Cyberpunk: Edgerunners		ONA	2022	JA/EN
Da Capo (visual novel)		TV	2003	JA/EN
Dance in the Vampire Bund	Dansu in za Vanpaia Bando	TV	2010	JA/EN
Dance With Devils		TV	2015	JA
Darling in the Franxx		TV	2018	JA
Date A Live		TV	2013	JA/EN
Diabolik Lovers	Diaborikku Ravāzu	TV	2013	JA
D.N.Angel	Dī Enu Enjeru	TV	2003	JA/AN
DNA²		TV	1994	JA/AN
Eden of the East		TV	2009	JA/EN
Ef - a tale of memories		TV	2007	JA/EN
Elfen Lied	Erufen Rīto	TV	2004	JA/EN
Engaged to the Unidentified	Mikakunin de Shinkōkei	TV	2014	JA
Eureka Seven		TV	2005	JA/EN
Fate/stay night		TV	2006	JA/EN
Fortune Arterial	Fortune Arterial: Akai Yakusaku	TV	2010	JA
From Me To You	Kimi Ni Todoke	TV	2009	JA
Fruits Basket	Furūtsu Basuketto	TV	2001	JA/EN
Full Metal Panic!	Furumetaru Panikku	TV	2002	JA/EN
Full Metal Panic? Fumoffu	Furumetaru Panikku? Fumoffu	TV	2003	JA/EN
Full Moon wo Sagashite		TV	2002	JA/EN
Fushigi Yugi: The Mysterious Play		TV	1995	JA/EN
Future Diary	Mirai Nikki	TV	2011	JA/EN
Glasslip		TV	2014	JA
Gakuen Alice (Alice Academy or Alice School)	Gakuen Arisu	TV	2005	JA/EN
Ginban Kaleidoscope	Ginban Kareidosukōpu	TV	2005	JA/EN
Glasslip		TV	2014	JA
Golden Time		TV	2013	JA
Gosick		TV	2011	JA
Guilty Crown		TV	2011	JA/EN
He Is My Master	Kore ga Watashi no Goshujin-sama	TV	2005	JA
Here is Greenwood		OVA	1991	JA/EN
High School DxD Born		TV	2015	JA/EN
His and Her Circumstances	Kare Kano	TV	1998	JA/EN
Honey and Clover	Hachimitsu to Kurōbā	TV	2005	JA
Horizon in the Middle of Nowhere		TV	2011	JA/EN
H2O: Footprints in the Sand		TV	2008	JA
I My Me! Strawberry Eggs		TV	2001	JA/EN
Ichigo 100%		TV	2005	JA
If Her Flag Breaks	Kanojo ga Flag wo Oraretara	TV	2014	JA
If I See You in My Dreams		TV	1998	JA/EN
Inuyasha		TV	1996	JA/EN
Inu x Boku SS		TV	2012	JA/EN
Is this a zombie?	Kore wa zombie desu ka?	TV	2011	JA
I've Always Liked You	Zutto Mae Kara Suki Deshita: Kokuhaku Jikkou Iinkai	Movie	2016	JA
Kaguya-sama: Love is War	Kaguya-sama wa Kokurasetai - Tensai-tachi no Ren'ai Zunōsen	TV	2019	JA/EN
Kamisama Kiss	Kamisama Hajimemashita	TV	2012	JA/EN
Kanokon: The Girl Who Cried Fox	Kanokon	TV	2008	JA/EN
Kanon	Kanon	TV	2006	JA/EN
Kids on the Slope	Sakamichi no Apollon	TV	2012	JA/EN
Kimi ni Todoke: From Me to You	Kimi ni Todoke	TV	2009	JA/EN
Kimikiss: Pure Rouge	KimiKisu	TV	2007	JA
Kirarin Revolution	Kirarin Reboryūshon	TV	2004	JA
Kodomo no Omocha (Child's Toy),	Kodocha	TV	1996	JA/EN
Kokoro Connect	Kokoro Konekuto	TV	2012	JA/EN
Kotoura-san		TV	2013	JA
Love, Chunibyo & Other Delusions	Chūnibyō demo Koi ga Shitai!	TV	2012	JA/EN
Lovely Complex	Love*Com	TV	2007	JA
Love Hina	Rabu Hina	TV	2000	JA/EN
Magic-Kyun! Renaissance		TV	2016	JA
Maiden Spirit Zakuro	Otome Yōkai Zakuro	TV	2010	JA
Maburaho	Maburaho	TV	2000	JA/EN
Maison Ikkoku	Mezon Ikkoku	TV	1986	JA
Marmalade Boy	Mamarēdo Bōi	TV	1994	JA/EN
Mashiroiro Symphony	Mashiroiro Symphony: Love is pure white	TV	2011	JA
Mermaid Melody Pichi Pichi Pitch	Māmeido Merodī Pichi Pichi Pitchi	TV	2004	JA
My Guardian Characters	Shugo Chara!	TV	2007	JA/EN
My Little Monster	Tonari no Kaibutsu-kun	TV	2008	JA
My Little Sister Can't Be This Cute!	Ore no Imōto ga Konna ni Kawaii Wake ga Nai (OreImo)	TV	2010	JA
My Love Story!!	Ore Monogatari!!	TV	2015	JA
Myself ; Yourself		TV	2007	JA
Mysterious Girlfriend X	Nazo no Kanojo X	TV	2012	JA/EN
Nakaimo - My Sister Is Among Them!	Kono Naka ni Hitori, Imouto ga Iru!	TV	2012	JA/EN
Nana	nana	TV	2006	JA/EN
Neighborhood Story	Gokinjo Monogatari	TV	1995	JA
Omamori Himari	Omamori Himari	TV	2010	JA
One Week Friends	Isshukan Friends	TV	2014	JA
Orange (manga)		TV	2016	JA/EN
Oreshura	Ore No Kanojo To Osananajimi Ga Shuraba Sugiru	TV	2013	JA
Ouran High School Host Club	Oran Koko Hosuto Kurabu	TV	2006	JA/EN
Paradise Kiss	Paradaisu Kisu	TV	2005	JA/EN
Peach Girl	Pīchi Gāru	TV	2005	JA/EN
Place to Place	Acchi Kocchi	TV	2012	JA
Plastic Memories		TV	2015	JA/EN
Please Teacher!	Onegai Teacher	TV	2002	JA/EN
Prétear	Shin Shirayuki-hime Densetsu Purītia	TV	2001	
Princess Jellyfish	Kuragehime	TV	2010	
Ranma ½		TV	1989	JA
Red Data Girl	Ārudījī Reddo Dēta Gāru	TV	2013	JA/EN
Riddle Story of Devil	Akuma no Ridoru	TV	2014	
Rosario + Vampire	Rozario to Banpaia	TV	2008	JA/EN
Rumbling Hearts	Kimi Ga Nozomu Eien	TV	2003-2004	JA
Samurai Harem: Asu noYoichi		TV	2009	JA
Sankarea		TV	2012	JA
Say "I love you"	Sukitte Iinayo	TV	2012	JA/EN
School Days (visual novel)		TV	2007	JA
School Rumble	Sukūru Ranburu	TV	2004	JA/EN
Shakugan No Shana		TV	2005	JA/EN
Shuffle!	Shaffuru!	TV	2005	JA/EN
Skip Beat!	Sukippu Bīto!	TV	2011	JA/EN
Sugar Sugar Rune	Shuga Shuga Rūn	TV	2005	JA
Sky With A Rising Half-Moon	Hanbun No Tsuki Ga Noboru Sora	TV	2006	JA
Snow White with the Red Hair	Akagami no Shirayukihime	TV	2015	JA/EN
Sola (manga)		TV/OVA	2007	JA
Song Of The Prince	Uta no prince sama	TV	2011	JA
Special A / S · A: Special A	S·A Supesharu Ē	TV	2008	JA/EN
Spice and Wolf	Imagin	TV	2008	JA/EN
Suzuka		TV	2005	JA/EN
Sword Art Online		TV	2012	JA/EN
The Last: Naruto The Movie	Naruto	Movie	2014	JA/EN
The Pet Girl of Sakurasou	Sakurasou no Pet na Kanojo	TV	2012	JA
The President is a Maid!	Kaichou wa Maid-sama!	TV	2010	JA
The Wallflower	Yamato Nadeshiko Shichi Henge	TV	2006	JA/EN
The World God Only Knows	Kami nomi zo Shiru Sekai	TV	2010	JA/EN
The World God Only Knows II	Kami nomi zo Shiru Sekai 2	TV	2011	JA/EN
The World's Greatest First Love	Sekai-Ichi Hatsukoi	TV	2011	JA
To Love-Ru	To Love-Ru	TV/OVA	2008	JA
Tokyo Mew Mew	Tōkyō Myū Myū	TV	2002	JA/EN
Toradora!		TV	2008	JA/EN
UFO Baby	Dā! Dā! Dā!	TV	2002	JA
Ultra Maniac	Urutora Maniakku	TV	2003	JA/EN
Vampire Knight		TV	2008	JA/EN
Waiting in the Summer	Ano Natsu de Matteru	TV	2012	JA
We were there	Bokura ga Ita	TV	2006	JA
Weathering With You	Tenki No Ko	Movie	2019	JA/EN
Witch Craft Works		TV	2014	JA
Wolf Girl and Black Prince	Ōkami Shōjo to Kuro Ōji	TV	2014	JA
Yamada-kun and the Seven Witches	Yamada-kun to 7-nin no majo	TV	2013	JA/EN
Yona Of The Dawn	Akatsuki no Yona	TV	2014	JA
Your Lie in April	Shigatsu wa Kimi no Uso	TV	2014	JA/EN
Your Name	Kimi no na wa	Movie	2016	JA/EN
