= Extrabreit =

German rock band

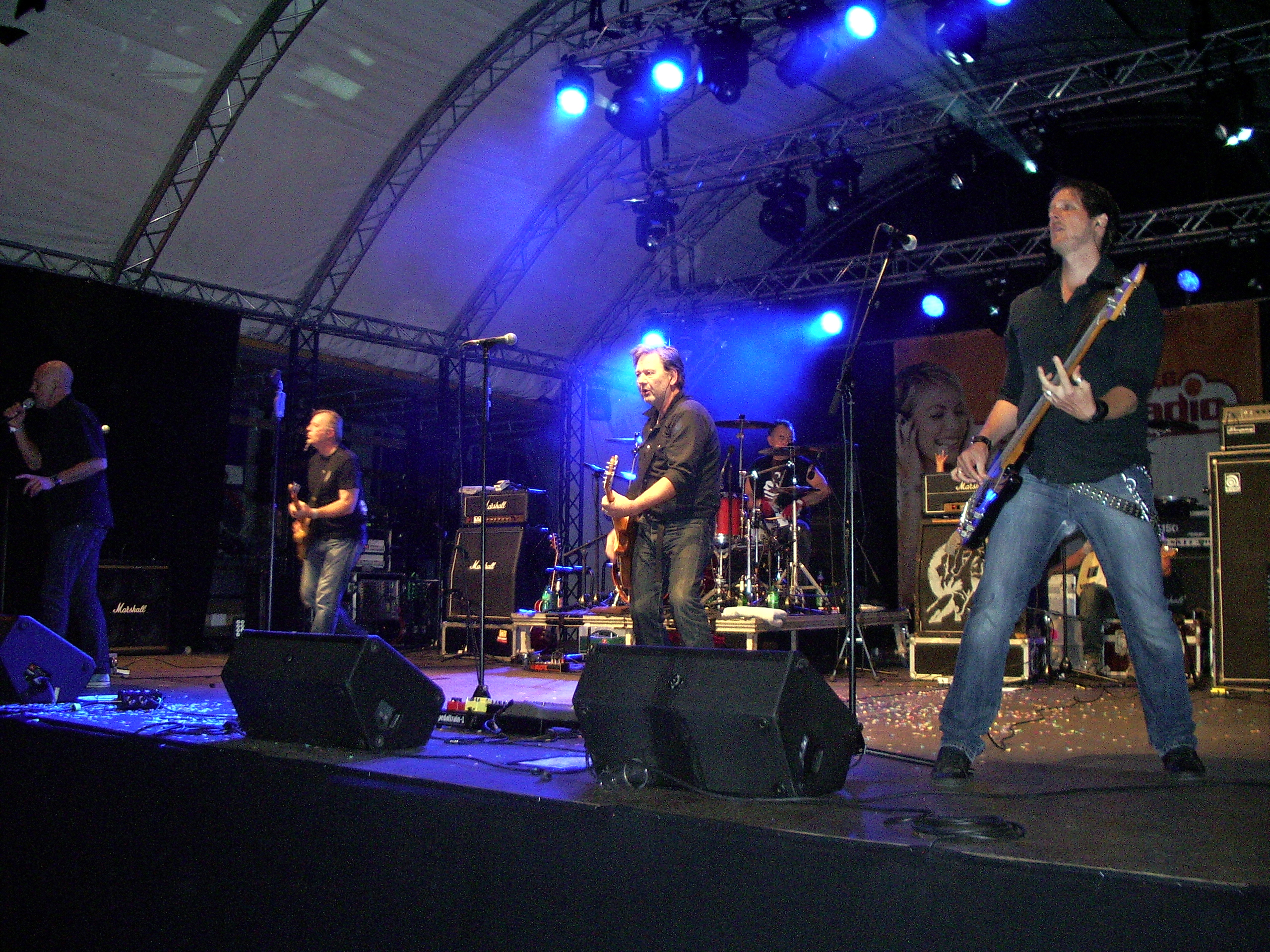
- Extrabreit in 2013

Background information
- Origin: Hagen, West Germany
- Genres: NDW
- Years active: 1978–present
- Members: Kai "Havaii" Schlasse; Stefan "Kleinkrieg" Klein; Bubi Hönig; Lars Larson; Rolf Möller
- Website: www.die-breiten.de

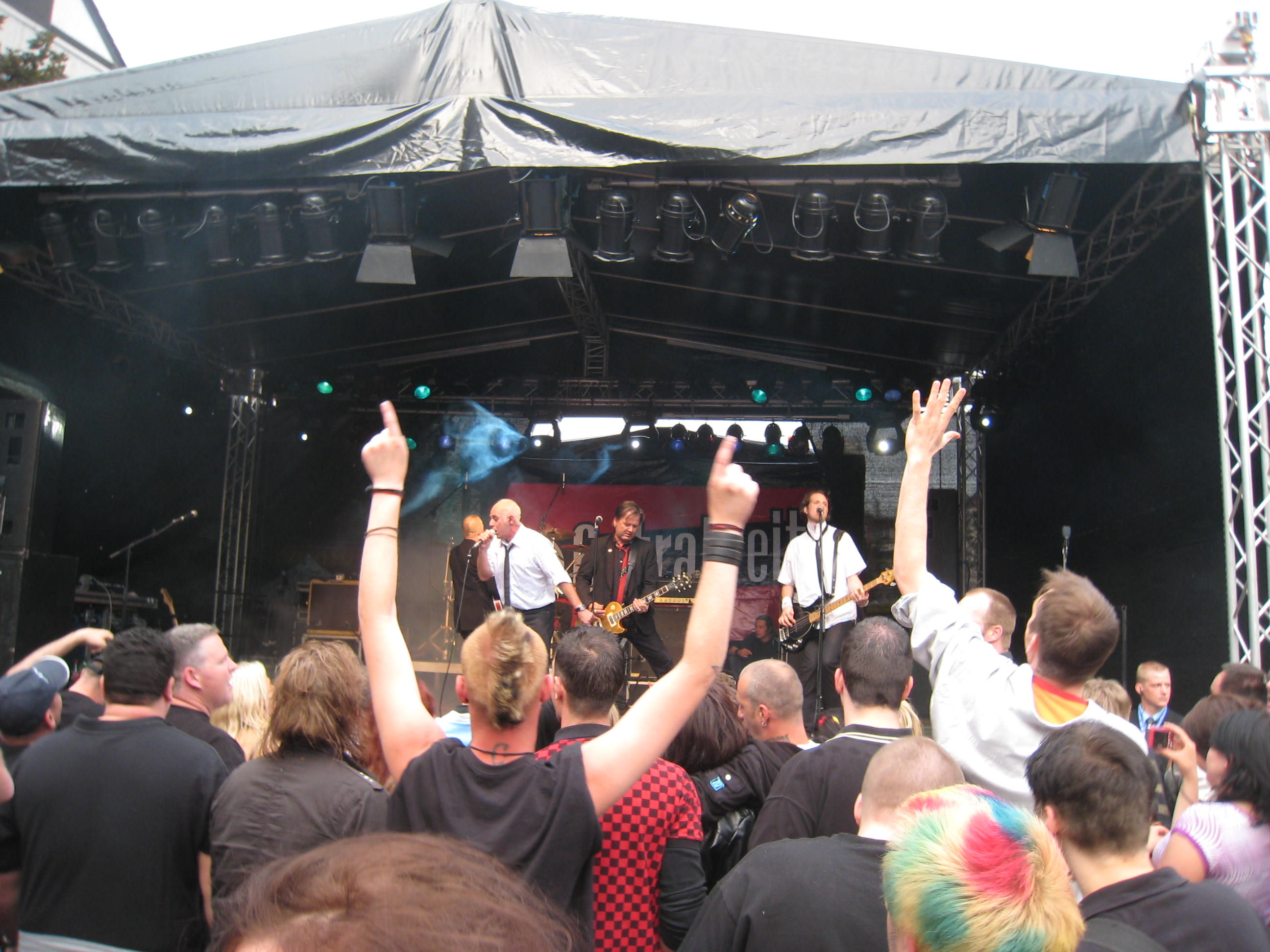
Extrabreit in 2008

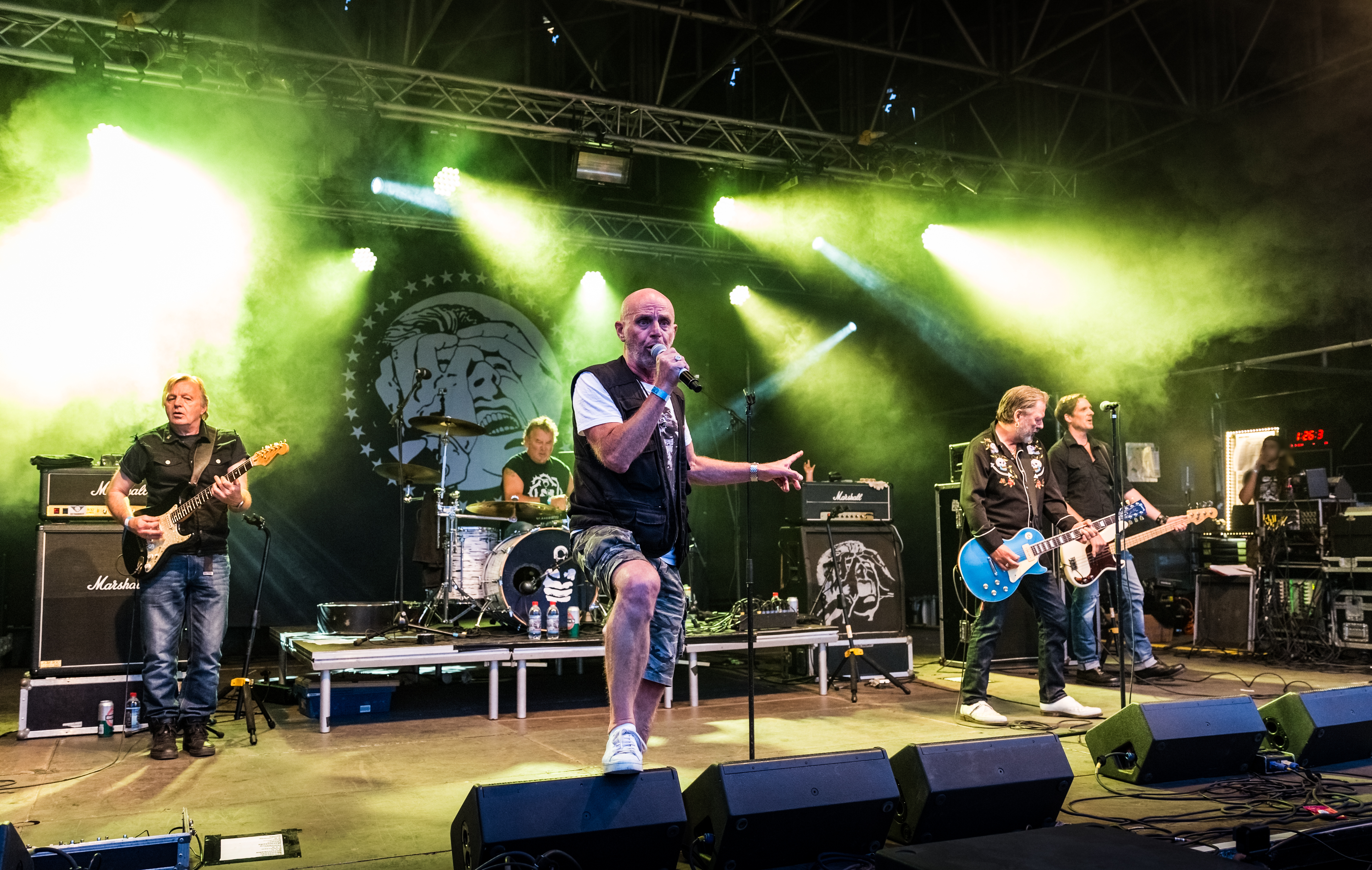
Extrabreit live at Wacken Open Air 2018

Extrabreit is a German punk rock band established in Hagen, Germany in 1978. The band was one of the most successful exponents of the Neue Deutsche Welle movement of the 1980s.

== History ==
The band was founded around the end of 1978, when they began their career as a German punk rock band; later they were ascribed to the Neue Deutsche Welle (NDW) movement, though their music is not typical of the NDW genre. It was influenced heavily by punk rock music, and their lyrics were often critical of politics and society. The members viewed themselves as punks, whose only association with the NDW was that they appeared at the same time. As testament to that, they wrote on their homepage: "Ja wir haben den Scheiß eben mitgemacht!" (Yeah, we went along with that shit).

The highlight of their career was seen from 1981 until 1983, as they played for sold-out crowds, had records go Gold and Platinum and were pictured on the cover of BRAVO. After two band members left the group in 1983, they released two albums: Europa and LP der Woche. After a creative break until 1987, the band returned with an album that was heavily influenced by The Cure. In the 1990s, Extrabreit moved onto writing lyrics highly critical of society and full of sharp sarcasm (a little bit similar to Dead Kennedys). Their new work did not enjoy the same commercial success of their earlier albums. After their 'Final concert' in the "Berlet Halle" Hagen - Hohenlimburg on 19 September 1998, the group went on to play in Bochum in 2002 and are touring Germany. Also they had in 2010 a concert with the Philharmonic Orchestra Hagen. In the past they recorded songs with Hildegard Knef, Harald Juhnke and Marianne Rosenberg.

Extrabreit played their 1000th concert on 27 August 2005 to several thousand fans in Hengsteysee in Hagen. The band was presented with their first Platinum record for their first major success in 1980.

== Band members ==
- Vocals: Kai "Havaii" Schlasse
- Guitar: Stefan "Kleinkrieg" Klein, Bubi Hönig
- Bass: Lars Larson
- Drums: Rolf Möller

== Discography ==
=== Albums/CDs ===
- Ihre größten Erfolge (Their Greatest Successes), 1980 LP/CD
- Welch ein Land - Was für Männer (What A Country - What Men), 1981 LP/CD
- Rückkehr der phantastischen Fünf (Return Of The Fantastic Five), 1982 LP/CD
- Europa (Europe), 1983 LP/CD
- LP der Woche (Record Of The Week), 1984 LP/CD
- Sex after three years in a submarine, 1987 LP/CD
- Das grenzt schon an Musik (Live) (That's Bordering On Music), 1990 LP/CD
- Wer böses denkt soll endlich schweigen (He Who Has Evil Thoughts Should Be Silent At Last), 1991 LP/CD
- Hotel Monopol, 1993 CD
- Jeden Tag - Jede Nacht (Every Day - Every Night), 1996 CD
  - No. 65. in Germany
- Superfett - Das Beste (Super Fat - The Best), 1996 CD
- Amen, 1998 CD
- Das letzte Gefecht (Live) (The Last Stand), 2002 CD
- Unerhört (Scandalous), 2003 CD
- Ihre Allergrößten Erfolge (Their Very Biggest Successes), 2003 CD
- Frieden (Peace), 2005 CD
- Neues von Hiob (News from Job), 2008 LP/CD
- 30 Jahre LIVE, 2009 CD
- Extrabreit Gold, 2009 CD
- Extrabreit und Philharmonisches Orchester Hagen - Live in Hagen, 2010 CD
- Auf Ex! (Chug-a-lug), 2020 CD

=== Singles ===
- Hart wie Marmelade (Hard as Jam), 1980
- Hurra, hurra, die Schule brennt (Hooray, Hooray, the School Is Burning), 1981
  - No. 12. in Germany
- Polizisten (Policemen), 1981
  - No. 27. in Germany
- Her mit den Abenteuern/Duo Infernal (Gimme the Adventures), 1982
  - No. 70. in Germany
- Kleptomanie, 1982 (Cleptomania)
- Learning Deutsch, 1983
- Secret Service, 1984
- Ruhm (Fame), 1984
- Blue Moon, 1987
- Hurra, Hurra die Schule brennt (Remix 90), 1990 MCD
- Flieger, grüß mir die Sonne (Remix 90) (Aircraftman, Say Hello To The Sun), 1990 MCD
  - No. 15. in Germany
- Ruhm, Live, 1990
- Polizisten (Live), 1991 MCD
- Joachim muß härter werden (Joachim Has To Become Tougher), 1991 MCD
- Der letzte Schliff (The Final Touch), 1991 MCD
- Für mich soll's rote Rosen regnen (It Should Rain Red Roses For Me), 1992 MCD
  - No. 35. in Germany
- Laß es regnen (Let It Rain), 1993 MCD
- Jeden Tag - Jede Nacht (Every Day - Every Night), 1996 MCD
- CVJM (YMCA), 1996 MCD
- Nichts ist für immer (Nothing's For Good), 1996 MCD
- Verdammter roter Mond (Bloody Red Moon), 1998 MCD
- ÖL! (kostenlose Promo) (Oil, free promotional), 2003 MCD
- Er macht ihn rein (He Puts It Inside, referring to soccer, means "shooting a goal"), 2003 MCD
- Neues Spiel (New Match), 2005 MCD
