= List of drama anime =

This is a list of drama anime television series, films, OVAs and ONAs.

Year(s)	Title	Type	Director	Studio	Ref
1976	3000 Leagues in Search of Mother	TV series	Isao Takahata	Nippon Animation	
1980	3000 Leagues in Search of Mother	Film	Isao Takahata, Hajime Okayasu	Nippon Animation	
1981	Ai no Gakko Cuore Monogatari	TV series	Eiji Okabe	Nippon Animation	
1989–1990	Gosenzo-sama Banbanzai!	OVA series	Mamoru Oshii	Pierrot	
1990	Maroko	Film	Mamoru Oshii	Pierrot	
1998	Sorcerous Stabber Orphen: Beginning	TV series	Hiroshi Watanabe	J.C. Staff	
1999	Sorcerous Stabber Orphen: Revenge	TV series	Toru Takahashi	J.C. Staff	
2000	Ah! My Goddess: The Movie	Film	Hiroaki Gōda	Anime International Company	
2005	Air	Film	Osamu Dezaki	Toei Animation	
2005	Aria The Animation	TV series	Jun'ichi Satō	Hal Film Maker	
2006	Aria The Natural	TV series	Jun'ichi Satō	Hal Film Maker	
2007	Clannad	Film	Osamu Dezaki	Toei Animation	
2007	5 Centimeters Per Second	Film	Makoto Shinkai	CoMix Wave Inc.	
2007	Aria the OVA: Arietta	OVA	Jun'ichi Satō	Hal Film Maker	
2007-2008	Clannad	TV series	Tatsuya Ishihara	Kyoto Animation	
2008	Clannad Another World: Tomoyo Chapter	OVA	Tatsuya Ishihara	Kyoto Animation	
2008	Aria The Origination	TV series	Jun'ichi Satō	Hal Film Maker	
2008	Akaneiro ni Somaru Saka	TV series	Keitaro Motonaga	TNK	
2008-2009	Clannad After Story	TV series	Tatsuya Ishihara	Kyoto Animation	
2009	Clannad Another World: Kyou Chapter	OVA	Tatsuya Ishihara	Kyoto Animation	
2012	A Letter to Momo	Film	Hiroyuki Okiura	Production I.G	
2012	009 Re:Cyborg	Film	Kenji Kamiyama	Production I.G, Sanzigen	
2014	The Pilot's Love Song	TV series	Toshimasa Suzuki	TMS/3xCube	
2020	Sorcerous Stabber Orphen: Wayward Journey	TV series	Takayuki Hamana	Studio Deen	
