= List of animated television series of 1971 =

A list of animated television series first aired in 1971.

Animated television series first aired in 1971
Title	Episodes	Country	Year	Notes	Technique
Andersen Monogatari	52	Japan	1971		Anime
Animentari Ketsudan	26	Japan	1971		Anime
Apache Yakyugun	26	Japan	1971–72		Anime
Archie's TV Funnies	16	United States	1971	Spin-off of The Archie Show	Traditional
Chingō Muchabei	26	Japan	1971		Anime
Crystal Tipps and Alistair	50	United Kingdom	1971–74		Anime
The Electric Company	780	United States	1971–77		Traditional/Live-action
The Funky Phantom	17	United States	1971–72		Traditional
GeGeGe no Kitarō	45	Japan	1971–72		Anime
Genshi Shōnen Ryū	22	Japan	1971–72		Anime
Glop	55	France	1971–72		Traditional
Help!... It's the Hair Bear Bunch!	16	United States	1971–72		Traditional
Une Histoire de Madame La Pie	13	France	1971		Cut-Outs
Hyppo and Thomas	300	Japan	1971–72		Anime
The Jackson 5ive	23	United States; United Kingdom	1971–72	Based on the popular 70s band	Traditional
Kunimatsu-sama no Otoridai	46	Japan	1971–72		Anime
La Linea	90	Italy	1971–86		Traditional
Lupin the 3rd Part I: The Classic Adventures	23	Japan	1971–72		Anime
The Magic Ball	26	United Kingdom	1971–72		Traditional
Marvelous Melmo	26	Japan	1971–72		Anime
Mr Benn	14	United Kingdom	1971–72, 2005		Traditional
The New Pink Panther Show	17	United States	1971-74	Package series	Traditional
The Pebbles and Bamm-Bamm Show	20	United States	1971–72	Spin-off of The Flintstones	Traditional
Sarutobi Ecchan	26	Japan	1971–72		Anime
Sekai Monoshiri Ryoko	1006	Japan	1971–74		Anime
Shin Obake no Q-Tarō	70	Japan	1971–72		Anime
Shin Skyers 5	26	Japan	1971–72		Anime
Štaflík a Špagetka	39	Czechoslovakia	1971–2014		Traditional
Tensai Bakabon	40	Japan	1971–72		Anime
Wandering Sun	26	Japan	1971		Anime
Zoom the White Dolphin	26	France; Japan	1971–72		Traditional

== See also ==
- List of animated feature films of 1971
- List of Japanese animation television series of 1971
