= 1971 in animation =

Events in 1971 in animation.

== Events ==
=== March ===
- March 28: The Peanuts TV special Play It Again, Charlie Brown premieres on CBS.

=== April ===
- April 15: 43rd Academy Awards: Is It Always Right to Be Right? by Nick Bosustow wins the Academy Award for Best Animated Short.

=== July ===
- July 30: Michael Hirsh, Patrick Loubert, and Clive A. Smith establish the animated studio Nelvana.

=== September ===
- September 11: The first episode of The Jackson Five airs.

=== October ===
- October 7: Bedknobs and Broomsticks is first released.

=== November ===
- November 10: Frank Zappa's film 200 Motels premieres which features an animated sequence by Cal Schenkel.

=== December ===
- December 15: The first Lucky Luke feature film, Daisy Town, directed by René Goscinny and Morris is first released.
- December 21: Richard Williams' TV special A Christmas Carol is first broadcast.

== Films released ==
- January 1 – Prince Ho-Dong and Princess Nak-Rang (South Korea)
- March 6 – Benny's Bathtub (Denmark)
- March 17 – Attack No. 1: Immortal Bird (Japan)
- March 20
  - Animal Treasure Island (Japan)
  - Kamui (1964 manga) (Japan)
- June 18 – The Poor Miller's Boy and the Kitten (East Germany)
- July 15 – The Christmas Present (Brazil)
- July 18 – Ali Baba and the Forty Thieves (Japan)
- July 23 – Lightning Atom (South Korea)
- September 24 – Do It! Yasuji's Pornorama (Japan)
- September 25 – Tiki Tiki (Canada)
- November 29 – The Wardrobe of Time (Spain)
- December 13 – Bedknobs and Broomsticks (United States)
- December 15 – Daisy Town (France and Belgium)

== Television series ==
=== Debuts ===
- January 1 - Kaba Totto debuts on Fuji TV.
- January 3 - Andersen Monogatari debuts on Fuji TV.
- January 5 - The Magic Ball debuts on ITV.
- February 5 - Chingo Muchabei debuts on TBS.
- February 25 - Mr Benn debuts on BBC1.
- April 3 - Animentari Ketsudan debuts on Fuji TV.
- April 8 - Wandering Sun debuts on Fuji TV.
- September 1 - Shin Obake No Q-tarô debuts on Nippon TV.
- September 11:
  - Archie's TV Funnies, Help!... It's the Hair Bear Bunch!, and The Pebbles and Bamm-Bamm Show debut on CBS.
  - The Funky Phantom and The Jackson 5ive debut on ABC.
- September 25 - Tensai Bakabon debuts on Yomiuri TV.
- October 1 - Sekai Monoshiri Ryokô debuts in syndication.
- October 2 - Marvelous Melmo debuts on TBS.
- October 4 - Sarutobi Ecchan debuts on TV Asahi.
- October 6 - Apache Yakyû-gun debuts on TV Asahi.
- October 7:
  - GeGeGe no Kitaro debuts on Fuji TV.
  - Shin Skyers 5 debuts on TBS.
- October 24 - Lupin III 1 debuts on Yomiuri TV.
- October 30 - Genshi Shônen Ryû debuts on TBS.
- Specific date unknown - La Linea debuts on RAI.

=== Specials ===
- February 2 - The Point! airs on ABC.
- March 10 – The Cat in the Hat airs on CBS.
- March 28 – Play It Again, Charlie Brown airs on CBS.
- April 4 – Here Comes Peter Cottontail airs on ABC.
- November 14 - The Legend of Robin Hood airs on CBS.
- November 28 - Treasure Island airs on CBS.

== Births ==
=== January ===
- January 2:
  - Taye Diggs, American actor (voice of Dress-Up Declan in Doc McStuffins, Capper in My Little Pony: The Movie, Mr. Twist in Ada Twist, Scientist, Black Panther in The Super Hero Squad Show episode "Tremble at the Might of M.O.D.O.K.!").
  - Renée Elise Goldberry, American actress and singer (voice of Dhabubu in The Lion Guard, Mrs. Nowhere in Fast & Furious Spy Racers, Waterbaby in Centaurworld).
  - Clint Bond, American animator (The Simpsons, The SpongeBob Movie: Sponge Out of Water), storyboard artist (SpongeBob SquarePants, The Prince, Duncanville), character designer, prop designer (Nickelodeon Animation Studio) and director (Duncanville).
- January 7: Jeremy Renner, American actor (voice of Swifty in Arctic Dogs, Hawkeye in What If...?).
- January 8: Zac Moncrief, American animator, writer, storyboard artist, producer and director (Johnny Bravo, Family Guy, Phineas and Ferb).
- January 11: Mary J. Blige, American singer and songwriter (voice of Irene in Sherlock Gnomes, Queen Essence in Trolls World Tour).
- January 15:
  - Regina King, American actress and director (voice of Huey Freeman and Riley Freeman in The Boondocks, Kreela in The Ant Bully, Dynamite in Planes: Fire & Rescue).
  - Gene Grillo, American television writer (Warner Bros. Animation, Nickelodeon Animation Studio, Duckman, Timon & Pumbaa, Johnny Bravo, Squirrel Boy, The 7D, Rainbow Butterfly Unicorn Kitty, Samurai Rabbit: The Usagi Chronicles).
- January 16: Steven Darancette, American television writer (Warner Bros. Animation, Pet Alien, Zorro: Generation Z, Lalaloopsy, Tumble Leaf, Bob the Builder).
- January 18:
  - Laurie Elliott, Canadian actress, television writer, and comedian (voice of Jo in the Total Drama franchise, Rodney Patella in Moville Mysteries, Noah Parker in Atomic Betty).
  - Seamus O'Regan, Canadian politician and television host (voiced himself in the Wapos Bay episode "Long Goodbyes").
- January 19: Heather Bambrick, Canadian musician and actress (voice of Koki in Wild Kratts, Mom Tiger in Daniel Tiger's Neighborhood, Naughty Kitty in Atomic Puppet, additional voices in Hotel Transylvania: The Series).
- January 20: Questlove, American musician and actor (voice of Curley in Soul).
- January 21: Darren Frost, Canadian voice actor (voice of Harold in Total DramaRama, Squirt in Camp Lakebottom, Chet in Total Drama Presents: The Ridonculous Race, Darth in 6teen, Sam in Time Warp Trio).
- January 25: Ana Ortiz, American actress and singer (voice of Rafa in Elena of Avalor, Anna Ramirez in Batman: Gotham Knight, Ballet Dancer in Ralph Breaks the Internet, Lucy Tucci in Home: Adventures with Tip & Oh, Cinnamon in the Family Guy episode "Baking Bad").
- January 30: Travis Cowsill, American animator (Taz-Mania, Stay Tuned, Thumbelina), storyboard artist (Little Shop, Mutant League, The Savage Dragon, Biker Mice from Mars, The Oz Kids, Earthworm Jim, Wild C.A.T.s, The Legend of Calamity Jane, Mummies Alive!, FernGully 2: The Magical Rescue, Invasion America, Timon & Pumbaa, Watership Down, D'Myna Leagues, Undergrads, Toad Patrol, Shuriken School, Storm Hawks, Kappa Mikey, The Venture Bros.) and prop designer (Ed, Edd n Eddy).

=== February ===
- February 1:
  - Hynden Walch, American actress, singer and writer (voice of Starfire in Teen Titans and Teen Titans Go!, Penny Sanchez in ChalkZone, Princess Bubblegum in Adventure Time, Harley Quinn in The Batman, Batman: Assault on Arkham, Batman: Hush, and Justice League Dark: Apokolips War, Ace in Justice League and Justice League Unlimited, Elsie in Stanley, Alice May in Scooby-Doo! Mystery Incorporated, Maureen Connor / Permafrost in the Static Shock episode "Frozen Out").
  - Michael C. Hall, American actor (voice of Toffee in Star vs. the Forces of Evil, Kirk Langstrom / Batman in Justice League: Gods and Monsters).
- February 4: Rob Corddry, American actor and comedian (voice of Gary Supernova in Escape from Planet Earth, Randy in the Glenn Martin, DDS episode "Videogame Wizard", Ben Jennings in the Family Guy episode "Livin' on a Prayer").
- February 6: Brian Stepanek, American actor (voice of Lynn Loud Sr. in The Loud House).
- February 12: Scott Menville, American voice actor (voice of Robin in Teen Titans and Teen Titans Go!, Brian in Rainbow Brite, Danny in My Little Pony 'n Friends, Red Herring in A Pup Named Scooby-Doo, Ma-Ti in Captain Planet and the Planeteers, Doctor Octopus in Spider-Man, Jimmy Jones in the Ben 10 franchise, Zack in Where on Earth Is Carmen Sandiego?, Bucky Barnes in The Avengers: Earth's Mightiest Heroes, Sneezy in The 7D, Shaggy Rogers in Shaggy & Scooby-Doo Get a Clue!, Bucky Hensletter in Randy Cunningham: 9th Grade Ninja, Toby Danger in the Freakazoid! episode "Toby Danger in Doomsday Bet").
- February 15: Alex Borstein, American actress, comedian, writer (Pinky, Elmyra & the Brain, Histeria!, Family Guy) and producer (voice of Lois Griffin in Family Guy, Becky in 3-South, various characters in Robot Chicken and Seth MacFarlane's Cavalcade of Cartoon Comedy, Latoyah in Slacker Cats, Mrs. Henscher in ParaNorman, Hadassah Lowenstein, Tyne Daly, Loretta Brown, Cake Woman and Trish in The Cleveland Show, Sophie and Peggy in The Angry Birds Movie, Janice and Becky Buckwald in Bordertown, Mali in Extinct, Police Chief Misty Luggins in The Bad Guys, Maya in the Gary & Mike episode "Road Rage", Cataclaws in the Big Bad Beetleborgs episode "Yo Ho Borgs").
- February 22: Lea Salonga, Filipina singer and actress (singing voice of Jasmine in Aladdin, Mulan in Mulan, and Celine in KPop Demon Hunters, voice of Yasuko Kusakabe in My Neighbor Totoro, Mysterious Woman in Centaurworld).
- February 25: Sean Astin, American actor (voice of Raphael in Teenage Mutant Ninja Turtles, Oso in Special Agent Oso, Shazam in Justice League Action and the DC Animated Movie Universe, Chester in Bunnicula, Randall McDuff in Party Wagon, himself in New Looney Tunes and the Scooby-Doo and Guess Who? episode "Returning of the Key Ring!").
- February 26: Oren Jacob, American technical director (Pixar).

=== March ===
- March 1: Teresa Gallagher, American-born English actress (voice of Nicole Watterson and Penny in The Amazing World of Gumball, Dashi in Octonauts, Emily and Rosie in Thomas & Friends, Mater's Computer in Cars 2, various characters in Thunderbirds Are Go).
- March 5:
  - Yuri Lowenthal, American voice actor, producer, and screenwriter (voice of Sasuke Uchiha in Naruto, Suzaku Kururugi in Code Geass, Ben Tennyson in the Ben 10 franchise, Simon in Gurren Lagann, Haru Glory in Rave Master, Barnaby Brooks in Tiger & Bunny, Superman and Superman X in Legion of Super Heroes, Lagoon Boy in Young Justice).
  - Scott Mosier, Canadian-American filmmaker (Jay & Silent Bob's Super Groovy Cartoon Movie!, The Grinch, Free Birds).
- March 7: Kali Troy, American actress (voice of Trixie Carter in American Dragon: Jake Long, Taranee Cook in W.I.T.C.H., Esther and Florence in Lazor Wulf).
- March 9: Kyle Balda, American animator and film director (Pixar, Illumination Studios).
- March 10:
  - Jon Hamm, American actor (voice of Herb Overkill in Minions, Captain Murphy in Archer, Mayor Webb in Bless the Harts, Sultan Jamawa in the Metalocalypse episode "Writersklok", O.T. in the Bob's Burgers episode "O.T.: The Outside Toilet", Cartoon Lord Hater in the Wander Over Yonder episode "The Cartoon", Don Grouper in the SpongeBob SquarePants episode "Goodbye, Krabby Patty?", Scallops in the Big Mouth episode "I Survived Jessi's Bat Mitzvah", Sentinel Prime in Transformers One, Mayor Jerry in Hoppers).
  - Jen Gould, Canadian actress (voice of Hotaru Tomoe/Sailor Saturn and PallaPalla in the Cloverway dub of Sailor Moon, Miss Triangle in Rolie Polie Olie, Additional voices in Busytown Mysteries).
- March 11: Johnny Knoxville, American stuntman, actor and filmmaker (voice of Peter Sterling and Hoyt Platter in King of the Hill, Leonardo in Teenage Mutant Ninja Turtles, Dean in The Goode Family episode "Gerald's Way or the Highway", Johnny Krill in the SpongeBob SquarePants episode "Extreme Spots", Johnny Rat Town in the Animals episode "Stuff.").
- March 12: Patric Caird, Canadian composer and musician (The Brothers Grunt, Cartoon Sushi, Ed, Edd n Eddy).
- March 15: Chris Patton, American voice actor (voice of Sousuke Sagara in Full Metal Panic!, Ikki Minami in Air Gear, Fakir in Princess Tutu, Hajime Aoyama in Ghost Stories, Greed in Fullmetal Alchemist, Asura in Soul Eater, Andromeda Shun in Saint Seiya, Keima Katsuragi in The World God Only Knows, Sanpei in Pokémon the Series: XY).
- March 16: Alan Tudyk, American actor (voice of King Candy in Wreck-It Ralph, Duke of Wesleton in Frozen, Alistair Krei in Big Hero 6 and Big Hero 6: The Series, Duke Weaselton in Zootopia, Ludo and River Butterfly in Star vs. the Forces of Evil, Superman in Justice League: War, Joker and Clayface in Harley Quinn, Optimus Prime in Transformers: EarthSpark).
- March 22:
  - Jay Stephens, Canadian cartoonist (creator of JetCat, Tutenstein, and The Secret Saturdays).
  - Keegan-Michael Key, American actor, comedian, producer, and screenwriter (voice of Murray in the Hotel Transylvania franchise, Ducky in Toy Story 4, Wendell in Wendell & Wild, Sebastian St. Clair in BoJack Horseman, the Ritual Master in The Dark Crystal: Age of Resistance, Toad in The Super Mario Bros. Movie, Jazzy James in The Simpsons episode "The Great Phatsby").
- March 24: Tig Notaro, American stand-up comedian, writer, and actress (voice of Big Tig in Zootopia 2, Professor in Beavis and Butt-Head Do the Universe, Sue in Clarence, Commander Lazar in The Fungies!, Purple Comet in the Adventure Time episode "The Comet", Ace Kallisto in Star Wars: Young Jedi Adventures).
- March 26: Tetsuya Iwanaga, Japanese voice actor (voice of Kensuke Aida in Neon Genesis Evangelion).
- March 27: Nathan Fillion, Canadian-American actor (voice of Hal Jordan/Green Lantern in Green Lantern: Emerald Knights and the DC Universe Animated Original Movies, Steve Trevor in Wonder Woman, Vigilante in Justice League Unlimited, Preston Northwest in Gravity Falls, Sterling in Cars 3, Brown Widow in The Venture Bros., Frisbee Guy in the King of the Hill episode "Luanne Virgin 2.0", Cornvelious Daniel in the Rick and Morty episode "The Rickshank Redemption", Axle Valvestuck in The Magic School Bus Rides Again episode "Waste Not, Want Not!", Wonder Man in the M.O.D.O.K. episode "This Man... This Makeover!", and Johnny Worthington III in Monsters University and Monsters at Work).
- March 29:
  - Scott M. Gimple, American television writer (Disney Television Animation, Ace Ventura: Pet Detective, ¡Mucha Lucha!, El Tigre: The Adventures of Manny Rivera, Robot Chicken, creator of Fillmore!).
  - Michael-Leon Wooley, American actor (voice of Louis in The Princess and the Frog, Tobias Whale in Beware the Batman, Mr. Pumpers in Breadwinners, Bell Beefer in OK K.O.! Let's Be Heroes, Tad Mulholland in Kipo and the Age of Wonderbeasts, Darkseid in Batman: The Brave and the Bold and Young Justice).
- March 31:
  - Craig McCracken, American animator, storyboard artist (2 Stupid Dogs), designer, writer, director and producer (creator of The Powerpuff Girls, Foster's Home for Imaginary Friends, Wander Over Yonder, and Kid Cosmic).
  - Ewan McGregor, Scottish actor (voice of the title character in Valiant, Rodney Copperbottom in Robots, Lumière in Beauty and the Beast, Sebastian J. Cricket in Pinocchio).

=== April ===
- April 6: Donavan Freberg, American photographer, advertising creative, voice actor and writer (voice of Tom Little in The Littles).
- April 12:
  - Nicholas Brendon, American actor (voice of Huntsboy 89 in American Dragon: Jake Long), (d. 2026).
  - Shannen Doherty, American actress (voice of Teresa in The Secret of NIMH, Breeze in the Gary & Mike episode "Phish Phry"), (d. 2024).
- April 15: Andy Daly, American actor and comedian (voice of the King of Ooo in Adventure Time, Officer Keys in Big City Greens, Two-Face in Harley Quinn, Tim Weekly in Solar Opposites, J.R. Scheimpough in Inside Job).
- April 16: James Purdum, American animator (The Simpsons), storyboard artist (Family Guy), sheet timer (Futurama) and director (Futurama, Drawn Together, Family Guy).
- April 18: David Tennant, Scottish actor (voice of Scrooge McDuck in DuckTales, the Fourth Doctor in The Infinite Quest and Dreamland, Huyang in Star Wars: The Clone Wars, Dread in Jake and the Never Land Pirates, Fugitoid in Teenage Mutant Ninja Turtles, Spitelout in the How to Train Your Dragon franchise, Charles Darwin in The Pirates! In an Adventure with Scientists!, Lord Commander in Final Space, Angus in The Loud House Movie, Igor in the Mickey Mouse Clubhouse episode "Mickey's Monster Musical").
- April 19: Scott McCord, Canadian actor (voice of Stinky in Miss Spider's Sunny Patch Friends, Fred in Time Warp Trio, Skull Boy in Ruby Gloom, Stone in 6teen, Yang in Yin Yang Yo!, Owen in the Total Drama franchise, Dan Kuso in Bakugan Battle Brawlers, Chaz Lang in Atomic Betty, McGee in Camp Lakebottom, Jake in Paw Patrol).
- April 23: Andrew Kreisberg, American comic book writer, television producer (Vixen) and writer (Mission Hill, Warner Bros. Animation, The Simpsons, Star Wars: The Clone Wars).
- April 30: Ariyan A. Johnson, American actress (voice of Tamara Lawrence in the Static Shock episode "The Usual Suspect").

=== May ===
- May 2: Jonas Rivera, American film producer (Pixar).
- May 17: Haruka Nakamura, Japanese former voice actor (voice of the title character in Super Milk Chan).
- May 18: Bob Boyle, American animator (Garfield and Friends, The Twisted Tales of Felix the Cat, CatDog), storyboard artist (Bobby's World, Mother Goose and Grimm, Cro, Sammy, Stanley, ChalkZone, Bravest Warriors), art director (The Fairly OddParents, Danny Phantom), writer, director (Sammy) and producer (Clarence, The Powerpuff Girls, Chico Bon Bon: Monkey with a Tool Belt, creator of Wow! Wow! Wubbzy! and Yin Yang Yo!).
- May 19:
  - Stephanie Nadolny, American voice actress (voice of young Goku and Gohan in the Dragon Ball franchise, first voice of K.O. in OK K.O.! Let's Be Heroes).
  - Grant George, American actor (voice of Lê Chiến Kim, Bob Roth, Markov, and Longg in Miraculous: Tales of Ladybug & Cat Noir, Ant-Man in Avengers Assemble, Guardians of the Galaxy, and Ultimate Spider-Man, Troyo in Elena of Avalor, Joe Okada/Jonathan Klondike in Glitter Force Doki Doki, Izuru Kira in Bleach).
- May 26:
  - Matt Stone, American actor, comedian, animator, screenwriter, producer, and composer (co-creator and voice of Kyle Broflovski, Kenny McCormick and Butters Stotch in South Park).
  - Shannon Kenny, Australian actress (voice of Inque in Batman Beyond, Rachel Leeds in Max Steel, Sazu in the Superman: The Animated Series episode "Warrior Queen").
- May 28: Acacia Caputo, American production assistant (King of the Hill), sheet timer and lip sync artist (Family Guy, King of the Hill, Dilbert, Mission Hill, X-Men: Evolution, Harvey Birdman, Attorney at Law, The Oblongs, Eloise: The Animated Series, American Dad!, The Goode Family, Sit Down, Shut Up, The LeBrons, Allen Gregory, Beavis and Butt-Head, Futurama, Napoleon Dynamite, Bob's Burgers, Avengers Assemble, Hulk and the Agents of S.M.A.S.H., How Murray Saved Christmas, Madea's Tough Love, Brickleberry, Clarence, Bordertown, The Simpsons, Disenchantment, Paradise PD, Duncanville, Central Park).
- May 30:
  - Idina Menzel, American actress and singer (portrayed and voiced Nancy Tremaine in Enchanted and Disenchanted, voice of Elsa in the Frozen franchise Ralph Breaks the Internet and Once Upon a Studio, Circe in the Hercules episode "Hercules and the Song of Circe", the Queen of Hearts in the Wonder Pets episode "Adventures in Wonderland", Dr. Paula in the Arthur episode "Shelter from the Storm").
  - John Ross Bowie, American actor (voice of Sven in Sofia the First, Mel Meyers in the Big Hero 6: The Series episode "Aunt Cass Goes Out").

=== June ===
- June 1: Janice Tolentino, American animator (The Tigger Movie, Futurama, The Simpsons), storyboard artist (My Life as a Teenage Robot, The Replacements, Dora the Explorer, The Cleveland Show, Dora and Friends: Into the City!, Disenchantment), animation checker and scene planner (The Ren & Stimpy Show).
- June 3: John Hodgman, American actor, author and humorist (voice of Charlie Jones and The Other Father in Coraline, John D. Rockerduck in DuckTales, Snoopy in The Venture Bros., Foreman in Milo Murphy's Law, Billions in Kipo and the Age of Wonderbeasts, Lord of Illumination in Wander Over Yonder).
- June 5: Mark Wahlberg, American actor, businessman, and former rapper (voice of Brian Crown/Blue Falcon in Scoob!).
- June 11: Kenjiro Tsuda, Japanese actor (voice of Overhaul in My Hero Academia, Seto Kaiba in Yu-Gi-Oh!, Hannes in Attack on Titan, Atomic Samurai in One-Punch Man, Joker in Fire Force, Kento Nanami in Jujutsu Kaisen, Bruford in JoJo's Bizarre Adventure).
- June 14: Mirabelle Kirkland, American-born French voice actress (voice of Yumi Ishiyama and Milly Solovieff in Code Lyoko, Isabelle in Eliot Kid, Cinderella in Eleanor's Secret, Florist and Wife in A Monster in Paris, additional voices in The Invisible Man, Casper's Scare School, Gawayn, The Mysterious Cities of Gold and Lassie) and television writer (Gawayn).
- June 18: Brad Kesten, American former child actor (voice of Charlie Brown in Is This Goodbye, Charlie Brown?, What Have We Learned, Charlie Brown?, You're a Good Man, Charlie Brown and season 1 of The Charlie Brown and Snoopy Show).
- June 22: Mary Lynn Rajskub, American actress (voice of Penny in the Home Movies episode "Those Bitches Tried to Cheat Me", Chloe O'Brian in The Simpsons episode "24 Minutes", Marilyn in the TripTank episode "Crossing the Line").
- June 23:
  - Doug Gallery, American sheet timer (Futurama, Film Roman, Cartoon Network Studios, The Cleveland Show, Sanjay and Craig, Turbo Fast, Pig Goat Banana Cricket, American Dad!, Bob's Burgers, Big Mouth, Central Park) and storyboard artist (Futurama).
  - Marc Alberich Lluís, Spanish comics artist and animator, (d. 2020).
- June 25: Angela Kinsey, American actress (voice of Angela in King of the Hill, Mia in the American Dad! episode "Merlot Down Dirty Shame").
- June 28:
  - Elon Musk, American entrepreneur and business magnate (voice of Elon Tusk in the Rick and Morty episode "One Crew over the Crewcoo's Morty", himself in The Simpsons episode "The Musk Who Fell to Earth" and the South Park episodes "Members Only", "Not Funny", and "The End of Serialization as We Know It").
  - Benito Martinez, American actor (voice of Lone Star in ¡Mucha Lucha!, El Curandero in Scooby-Doo! and the Monster of Mexico, Horatio Hidalgo in the What's New, Scooby-Doo? episode "High-Tech House of Horrors").
- June 30: Megan Fahlenbock, Canadian voice actress (voice of Gwen in the Total Drama franchise, Jen Masterson in 6teen, Eva Kant in Diabolik).

=== July ===
- July 3: Benedict Wong, English actor (voice of Tong in Raya and the Last Dragon, General in The Dark Crystal: Age of Resistance, Wong in the What If...? episode "What If... Doctor Strange Lost His Heart Instead of His Hands?").
- July 9: Scott Grimes, American actor and singer (voice of Pinocchio in Pinocchio and the Emperor of the Night, Steve Smith in American Dad!, Larry the Donut in The High Fructose Adventures of Annoying Orange, Kevin Swanson in Family Guy).
- July 15: Jim Rash, American actor, comedian, and filmmaker (voice of Prince Average in Red Shoes and the Seven Dwarfs, Cecil Turtle in The Looney Tunes Show, Principal Silmovitz in Randy Cunningham: 9th Grade Ninja, Marquess of Queensberry in Mike Tyson Mysteries, Gyro Gearloose in DuckTales, Flix in Star Wars Resistance, Riddler in Harley Quinn).
- July 16: Corey Feldman, American actor (voice of young Copper in The Fox and the Hound, SPRX-77 in Super Robot Monkey Team Hyperforce Go!, Slash in Teenage Mutant Ninja Turtles, himself in the Robot Chicken episode "Federation Resources").
- July 18: Joe Russo, American film director, producer, screenwriter and brother of Anthony Russo (voice of Movie Executive #1 in The Simpsons episode "Bart the Bad Guy").
- July 19: Wolf-Rüdiger Bloss, German-born American animator (DuckTales the Movie: Treasure of the Lost Lamp, An American Tail: Fievel Goes West, We're Back! A Dinosaur's Story, A Goofy Movie, The Adventures of Rocky & Bullwinkle, Shrek 2), visual effects artist (Industrial Light & Magic), storyboard artist (Littlest Pet Shop, Li'l Elvis Jones and The Truckstoppers, Oggy and the Cockroaches, Nickelodeon Animation Studio, My Little Pony: The Princess Promenade, Disney Television Animation, Puppy Dog Pals, The Boss Baby: Back in Business, Wacky Races, DC Super Hero Girls), writer (Billy Dilley's Super-Duper Subterranean Summer) and director (Hairy Scary, The Proud Family: Louder and Prouder, creator of Fred the Caveman).
- July 20: Sandra Oh, Canadian-American actress (voice of Marsha Mitsubishi in The Proud Family, Ting Ting in Mulan II, Sun Park in American Dragon: Jake Long, Doofah in The Land Before Time XIII: The Wisdom of Friends, Gal 2000 in Quantum Quest: A Cassini Space Odyssey, Castaspella in She-Ra and the Princesses of Power, Mrs. Zhong in Over the Moon, Debbie Grayson in Invincible, Virana in Raya and the Last Dragon, Ming in Turning Red, Breadcrumb in the Happily Ever After: Fairy Tales for Every Child episode "The Three Little Pigs").
- July 21: Amnon Wolf, Israeli actor (dub voice of Jake in Adventure Time, Hulk in various series for Marvel Animation, Mr. Grouper in Bubble Guppies, Dr. Nefario in the Despicable Me franchise, Grunkle Stan in Gravity Falls, Dr. Drakken, Duff Killigan, and Señor Senior Sr. in Kim Possible, Mantis in the Kung Fu Panda franchise, Timber Wolf in Legion of Super Heroes, Missing Link in the Monsters vs. Aliens franchise, Walden in Wow! Wow! Wubbzy!).
- July 26: Mike Kubat, Canadian television writer (Ed, Edd n Eddy, Atomic Cartoons, Chop Socky Chooks, Gormiti, League of Super Evil, Numb Chucks, Mickey Mouse Mixed-Up Adventures, Mira, Royal Detective).
- July 27: James O'Brien, American animator (The Simpsons), (d. 2005).
- July 30: Tom Green, Canadian actor and comedian (voice of Okra in Bling, Viracocha in Gemusetto Machu Picchu, Jerrold in the Dilbert episode "The Assistant", Terence McGavin in the Odd Job Jack episode "You Suck!", himself in the Clone High episode "A.D.D.: The Last 'D' is for Disorder").

=== August ===
- August 3: Arpi Krikorian, American animator and storyboard artist (The Angry Beavers, CatDog).
- August 4: Jeff Gordon, American former stock car racing driver (portrayed himself in Looney Tunes: Back in Action, voice of Jeff Gorvette in the Cars franchise, Gordon Gear in Mickey and the Roadster Racers, Turbo McAllister in the Speed Racer: The Next Generation episode "The Secrets of the Engine", Wacky Bustgutty in the Penn Zero: Part-Time Hero episode "Chuckle City 500", himself in The Simpsons episode "Adventures in Baby-Getting").
- August 6: Fatman Scoop, American rapper (voiced himself in The Boondocks episode "The Story of Thugnificent"), (d. 2024).
- August 7: Rachel York, American actress (voice of Bitty in Higglytown Heroes, Circe in the Justice League Unlimited episode "This Little Piggy", additional voices in Happy Feet).
- August 10: Justin Theroux, American actor, producer, director, and screenwriter (voice of Lord Garmadon in The Lego Ninjago Movie, Megamind's Father in Megamind, Miles Knightly in the Rick and Morty episode "One Crew over the Crewcoo's Morty").
- August 12: Yvette Nicole Brown, American actress (voice of Amanda Waller in DC Super Hero Girls, Luna in Elena of Avalor, Rhoda Roundhouse in New Looney Tunes, Captain Tully in The Chicken Squad, Cora Beakman in T.O.T.S., Cookie in Pound Puppies).
- August 15: Roy Conli, American film producer and voice actor (Walt Disney Animation Studios).
- August 17: Nick Cross, Canadian animator (Nelvana, Spümcø), storyboard artist (Ren & Stimpy "Adult Party Cartoon", Nelvana, Yin Yang Yo!, Jimmy Two-Shoes, The SpongeBob Movie: Sponge Out of Water, Uncle Grandpa, Pig Goat Banana Cricket, Tig n' Seek), background artist (Cartoon Network Studios), art director (Ren & Stimpy "Adult Party Cartoon", Cartoon Network Studios), writer, director and producer (Uncle Grandpa, Tig n' Seek).
- August 18: Jacob Vargas, Mexican-American actor (voice of Roberto Martinez in Max Steel, Prince Luis in the Happily Ever After: Fairy Tales for Every Child episode "Sleeping Beauty", Big Alto in The Proud Family episode "The Altos", Cisco Ramon in the Young Justice episode "Exceptional Human Beings").
- August 22: Richard Armitage, English actor (voice of Trevor Belmont in Castlevania).
- August 25: Peter Oldring, Canadian actor and comedian (voice of Cody, Tyler, and Ezekiel in the Total Drama franchise).
- August 26: Rob Boutilier, Canadian animator, storyboard artist (Ed, Edd n Eddy, Aaagh! It's the Mr. Hell Show!, Studio B Productions, The New Woody Woodpecker Show), writer (Ed, Edd n Eddy), director (Aaagh! It's the Mr. Hell Show!, Studio B Productions) and producer (The Snoopy Show, creator of Kid vs. Kat).
- August 30: Hunilla Fodor, American animator (The Simpsons), lip sync artist (Bless the Harts) and sheet timer (The Simpsons, Mission Hill, American Dad!, The Cleveland Show, Family Guy, DreamWorks Animation Television, Big Mouth, Bless the Harts, HouseBroken, Amphibia).

=== September ===
- September 1:
  - Dave Wittenberg, South African-born American actor (voice of Lang Rangler in JoJo's Bizarre Adventure: Stone Ocean, Kakashi Hatake in Naruto, Green Goblin in Marvel Future Avengers, Rocket Raccoon, Doctor Octopus, and Beast in Marvel Disk Wars: The Avengers, Time Baby in Gravity Falls, Numbuh 74.239 in Codename: Kids Next Door, Upchuck in Ben 10, Ferro Lad in Legion of Super Heroes).
  - Maury Sterling, American actor (voice of Thomas Elliott in Batman: Hush, Parry Francesco in Batman: The Killing Joke).
- September 2: Katt Williams, American actor and comedian (voice of a Pimp Named Slickback in The Boondocks and Seamus in Cats & Dogs: The Revenge of Kitty Galore).
- September 8:
  - Martin Freeman, English actor (voice of The Pirate with a Scarf in The Pirates! In an Adventure with Scientists!, Bernard D. Elf in Saving Santa, the title character in Stick Man, Reverend Parris in the Robot Chicken episode "Zero Vegetables", Poe De Spell in the DuckTales episode "The Life and Crimes of Scrooge McDuck!").
  - David Arquette, American actor (voice of Skully in Jake and the Never Land Pirates, Link in Tron: Uprising, Leech in the Static Shock episode "Romeo in the Mix").
- September 9:
  - Eric Stonestreet, American actor (voice of Minimus in Sofia the First, Duke in The Secret Life of Pets franchise).
  - Matt Selman, American screenwriter and producer (The Simpsons).
  - Mario D'Anna Jr., American animator, storyboard artist (Warner Bros. Animation, The Angry Beavers, CatDog, The Ant Bully, The Spectacular Spider-Man, The Secret Saturdays, The Goode Family, Neighbors from Hell, G.I. Joe: Renegades, Motorcity, Brickleberry, Bob's Burgers, Central Park, The Bob's Burgers Movie) and director (Bob's Burgers, Central Park, The Great North).
- September 10: Tomo Sakurai, Japanese voice actress (voice of Cynthia in Pokémon, Grisha no haha in Attack on Titan, Anila Aurobindo Ghose in Fafner in the Azure, Lilith's Mother in Holy Knights, Sora Asuka in The World God Only Knows, Misao Makimachi in Rurouni Kenshin), (d. 2025).
- September 12:
  - Adam Burke, American animator (Pixar), (d. 2018).
  - Doug Goldstein, American screenwriter, television producer, and director (Robot Chicken, Devil May Care).
- September 14: Christopher McCulloch, American animator, storyboard artist (The Tick, Jumbo Pictures, King of the Hill, Max Steel, Sheep in the Big City, Grim & Evil, Stanley), character designer (The Tick), television writer (The Tick, Celebrity Deathmatch, Superjail!), producer (Superjail!), director and voice actor (voice of Orangusnake and Boss Hosstrich in Mao Mao: Heroes of Pure Heart, Edward Cullen and Dolphin in the Robot Chicken episode "Casablankman 2", Newscaster in the Metalocalypse episode "Prankklok", Captain Kid in the Harvey Girls Forever! episode "The Dread Pirate Richie", creator and voice of Hank Venture and Monarch in The Venture Bros.).
- September 15: Colleen O'Shaughnessey, American actress (voice of Sora Takenouchi in Digimon, Ino Yamanaka in Naruto, Tails in the Sonic the Hedgehog franchise, Jazz Fenton in Danny Phantom, Wasp in The Avengers: Earth's Mightiest Heroes, Nel in Bleach).
- September 16: Amy Poehler, American actress and comedian (voice of Joy in the Inside Out franchise, Sally O'Malley in Horton Hears a Who!, Snow White in Shrek the Third, Eleanor in Alvin and the Chipmunks: The Squeakquel and Alvin and the Chipmunks: Chipwrecked, Jenda in The Simpsons, Duncan and Annie Harris in Duncanville, Gramma in the SpongeBob SquarePants episode "Have You Seen This Snail?", co-creator of and voice of Bessie Higgenbottom in The Mighty B!).
- September 18: Jada Pinkett Smith, American actress (voice of Gloria in the Madagascar franchise).
- September 19:
  - Sanaa Lathan, American actress (voice of Monica in The Golden Blaze, Donna Tubbs in The Cleveland Show and Family Guy, Catwoman in Harley Quinn).
  - Selene Luna, Mexican-American actress (voice of Tia Rosita in Coco).
- September 21:
  - Alfonso Ribeiro, American actor (voice of Randy Robertson in Spider-Man, Roland Jackson in Extreme Ghostbusters, Kephra in the Happily Ever After: Fairy Tales for Every Child episode "King Midas and the Golden Touch", Mr. Extras in the Big City Greens episode "Virtually Christmas", himself in Robot Chicken).
  - Luke Wilson, American actor (voice of Jim Stanton in Battle for Terra, Bodi in Rock Dog, Jeff Cooper in Fired on Mars, Batman in Bat-Fam).
- September 28: Craig Kellman, American animator and character designer (Madagascar, Hotel Transylvania, Cloudy with a Chance of Meatballs 2, Trolls, The Powerpuff Girls, Samurai Jack).

=== October ===
- October 2:
  - Tiffany Darwish, American musician and actress (voice of Judy Jetson in Jetsons: The Movie, Bambi's Mother and Cheetah in the Robot Chicken episode "Spike Fraser in: Should I Happen to Back Into a Horse").
  - Chris Savino, American former animator, storyboard artist (Space Goofs, Cow and Chicken, I Am Weasel, Mickey Mouse), writer (Nickelodeon Animation Studio, Cartoon Network Studios, Kick Buttowski: Suburban Daredevil, My Little Pony: Friendship Is Magic, Mickey Mouse, Get Blake!), director (Johnny Test) and producer (Kick Buttowski: Suburban Daredevil, creator of The Loud House).
- October 4: Richard Manginsay, Filipino-born American animator (Anastasia, Bartok the Magnificent, Futurama, Film Roman), storyboard artist (Family Guy), character designer (The Simpsons, Dead Space: Downfall) and prop designer (The Simpsons), (d. 2015).
- October 5: Sam Vincent, Canadian voice actor (voice of Edd in Ed, Edd n Eddy, Krypto in Krypto the Superdog, the title characters in Martin Mystery, and Dr. Dimensionpants, Russell Ferguson in Littlest Pet Shop, Eli Shane in Slugterra, Flim in My Little Pony: Friendship Is Magic, Bugs Bunny, Daffy Duck, Tweety, and Marvin the Martian in Baby Looney Tunes, H.E.R.B.I.E. in Fantastic Four: World's Greatest Heroes, continued voice of Lloyd Garmadon in Ninjago, singing voice of Sonic the Hedgehog in Sonic Underground).
- October 6:
  - Shinji Kawada, Japanese voice actor (voice of Shino Aburame in Naruto).
  - Emily Mortimer, English-American actress (voice of Young Sophie in Howl's Moving Castle, Holly Shiftwell in Cars 2, Mary of Nazareth in The Miracle Maker).
  - Tatsuya Nagamine, Japanese director (Dragon Ball Super: Broly, Dragon Ball: The Path to Power, Digimon: The Movie, One Piece) and animator (Dragon Ball Super: Broly, One Piece, Dragon Ball Z Kai), (d. 2025).
- October 13: Sacha Baron Cohen, English actor, comedian, producer and screenwriter (voice of King Julien in the Madagascar franchise, Uncle Ugo in Luca, Jakob in The Simpsons episode "The Greatest Story Ever D'ohed").
- October 17: Chris Kirkpatrick, American musician, actor and member of NSYNC (voice of Chip Skylark and Skip Sparkypants in The Fairly OddParents, Josh Jason Justin in the Stripperella episode "Eruption Junction, What's Your Function?", himself in The Simpsons episode "New Kids on the Blecch").
- October 20:
  - Snoop Dogg, American rapper, songwriter, media personality, actor and entrepreneur (voice of Max in Arthur and the Invisibles, Captain Mack and Macktastic in The Boondocks, Smoove Move in Turbo, Snoop in Trouble, Itt in The Addams Family and The Addams Family 2, Rev. Sugar Squires in F Is for Family, Infamous QT in The PJs episode "Ghetto Superstars", Alabaster Jones in the King of the Hill episode "Ho Yeah!", Per Se in the Xavier: Renegade Angel episode "Free Range Manibalism", Leroy Van Nuys in the Black Dynamite episode "Panic on the Player's Ball Express or That's Influenza Sucka!", Street Dogg in the Sanjay and Craig episode "Street Dogg", Tommy Tokes in the American Dad! episode "Jeff and the Dank Ass Weed Factory", himself in the Futurama episode "Into the Wild Green Yonder", The Cleveland Show episode "Back to Cool", the Mike Tyson Mysteries episode "Unsolved Situations", The Simpsons episode "The Great Phatsby", and the New Looney Tunes episode "Hip Hop Hare").
  - Rachel House, New Zealand actress (voice of Tala in the Moana franchise, Jerry B in Soul, Jacinta in Back to the Outback, Mama Binturong in The Lion Guard, Gladys in Pinecone & Pony, Topaz in the What If...? episode "What If... Thor Were an Only Child?", Parisia in the Amphibia episode "Olm Town Road").
  - Kōichi Tōchika, Japanese voice actor (voice of Neji Hyūga in Naruto, Toyohiro Kanedaichi in JoJo's Bizarre Adventure: Diamond Is Unbreakable, Hawkmon in Digimon Adventure 02).
- October 22: Jennifer Lee, American screenwriter and film director (Walt Disney Animation Studios).
- October 25: Craig Robinson, American actor and comedian (voice of LeVar Brown in The Cleveland Show, Mr. Shark in The Bad Guys, Mr. Grits in Sausage Party, Cookie in Shrek Forever After).
- October 26: Phil Johnston, American screenwriter, director, film producer, and voice actor (Walt Disney Animation Studios).
- October 29: Winona Ryder, American actress (voice of Elsa Van Helsing in Frankenweenie, Allison Taylor in The Simpsons episode "Lisa's Rival", herself in the Dr. Katz, Professional Therapist episode "Monte Carlo").
- October 30:
  - Mike Moon, American animator (Hanna-Barbera, Warner Bros. Animation, Timon & Pumbaa), background artist (The Simpsons, Batman: The Animated Series, Taz-Mania, Cartoon Network Studios), art director (Mickey Mouse Works, House of Mouse, The Powerpuff Girls Movie, Foster's Home for Imaginary Friends), director (House of Mouse) and producer (Foster's Home for Imaginary Friends).
- October 31: Nora Twomey, Irish animator, director, screenwriter, and producer (co-founder of Cartoon Saloon).

=== November ===
- November 1: Chris Prynoski, American animator, director and producer (co-creator of Downtown and Megas XLR, co-founder of Titmouse, Inc.).
- November 3: Seth Kearsley, American animator (The Maxx, The Simpsons, Disney Television Animation), storyboard artist (Timon & Pumbaa, Adelaide Productions, RoboCop: Alpha Commando, Bob's Burgers, Phineas and Ferb, Warner Bros. Animation, Illumination, Where's Waldo?, Ella Bella Bingo), writer (Sherlock Holmes in the 22nd Century, Phineas and Ferb, The Looney Tunes Show), producer (Slacker Cats) and director (Mummies Alive!, Dilbert, Eight Crazy Nights, Family Guy, Slacker Cats, The Goode Family, The Looney Tunes Show, Where's Waldo?, Trolls: TrollsTopia).
- November 5: Jonny Greenwood, English musician, composer and member of Radiohead (voiced himself in the South Park episode "Scott Tenorman Must Die").
- November 10: Walton Goggins, American actor (voice of Cecil Stedman in Invincible, Hendricks in Spirit Untamed, Enoch in the American Dad! episode "A Nice Night for a Drive", Bubba in the Squidbillies episode "Let 'er R.I.P.", Beef Roger Crumbchuck in Hexed).
- November 11:
  - Greg Chun, American voice actor and musician (voice of Muzan Kibutsuji in Demon Slayer: Kimetsu no Yaiba, Ryoji Kaji in Neon Genesis Evangelion, Gabriel Miller in Sword Art Online, Henry Wu in Jurassic World Camp Cretaceous, Sarge Charge in Power Players).
  - David DeLuise, American actor (voice of Coop Cooplowski in Megas XLR, Francis Butto in Roughnecks: Starship Troopers Chronicles).
- November 13: Victor Yerrid, American puppeteer (The Jim Henson Company, Crank Yankers, TripTank), television writer (Word Party) and actor (voice of Anthony Edwards, Kenny G, George W. Bush and David Crosby in Celebrity Deathmatch, Tardy Turtle, Cranky, Crippled Writer and Mr. Hygiene in Greg the Bunny, various characters in Robot Chicken and Mad, Gerald and Dad in Sid the Science Kid, Bailey in Word Party, Dorsal, Mac and Wart in Splash and Bubbles, Blind Boy in the Drawn Together episode "Clum Babies").
- November 20:
  - Enrico Casarosa, Italian-American storyboard artist (101 Dalmatians: The Series, PB&J Otter, Ice Age, Robots), film director (Luca) and writer (Pixar).
  - Joel McHale, American actor and comedian (voice of First Ninja in Randy Cunningham: 9th Grade Ninja, Victor Verliezer in Milo Murphy's Law, Prototype Norm Head in the Phineas and Ferb episode "Candace Unplugged", Alex in the BoJack Horseman episode "Yesterdayland", Death Stalker Hemorrhage in the Rick and Morty episode "Rickmancing the Stone").
- November 22: Crystal Scales, American voice actress (voice of Calvin in The PJs, Drifter Girl in Titan A.E., Abby Jones in The Electric Piper, Daisy Watkins in Static Shock, Lonnie in As Told by Ginger, Libby Folfax in Jimmy Neutron: Boy Genius and The Adventures of Jimmy Neutron, Boy Genius, Daisy in Oswald, Bernadette in All Grown Up!, Cleo Carter in Tutenstein, R. Kelly Supporter and Thelma Freeman in The Boondocks, Tamika in Class of 3000, Meesh in Batman: Gotham Knight, Crystal in Scooby-Doo! Abracadabra-Doo, Buster Carmichael in the Rugrats episode "A Rugrats Kwanzaa").
- November 23: Chris Hardwick, American actor, comedian, and television host (voice of Craig in Sanjay and Craig, Glowface in The X's, Green Arrow in The Batman, Otis in Back at the Barnyard, Sokka in The Legend of Korra episode "Out of the Past", Johnny Lawrence in the Family Guy episode "Once Bitten", himself in the Robot Chicken episode "The Robot Chicken Walking Dead Special: Look Who's Walking").
- November 25: Christina Applegate, American actress (voice of Mary Beth in The Book of Life, Candy in the Father of the Pride episode "One Man's Meat Is Another Man's Girlfriend").
- November 27: John Banh, American animator and storyboard artist (King of the Hill, The Grim Adventures of Billy & Mandy, Eloise: The Animated Series, Family Guy).
- November 30: Jessalyn Gilsig, Canadian actress (voice of Kayley in Quest for Camelot, Gertrude of Griswald in Young Robin Hood).

=== December ===
- December 4: Jennifer Martin, American voice actress (voice of Sara Bellum in The Powerpuff Girls).
- December 13: Van Partible, Filipino-American animator, storyboard artist (Scooby-Doo! Mystery Incorporated), writer (Yin Yang Yo!), director (Pete the Cat, Wolfboy and the Everything Factory) and producer (creator of Johnny Bravo).
- December 14: Tia Texada, American actress (voice of Elena Validis in Ben 10: Ultimate Alien, Talon in Static Shock, Mrs. Alvarez in Handy Manny).
- December 27: Christopher Swindle, American voice actor (voice of Li in Kung Fu Panda: The Paws of Destiny, Phlegm and Fungus in Monsters at Work, Doushu Goetsu in Boruto: Naruto Next Generations, Arthur Rimbaud in Bungo Stray Dogs).

=== Specific date unknown ===
- David Mandel, American television writer and producer (Clerks: The Animated Series, The Simpsons, Kappa Mikey).
- Joe Kelly, American television producer and writer (Man of Action Entertainment).
- Geoff Berner, Canadian singer, songwriter, musician and television writer (Kleo the Misfit Unicorn, Ed, Edd n Eddy).
- Gregor Narholz, Austrian composer (SpongeBob SquarePants).
- Bobby Gaylor, American television producer and writer (The PJs, Totally Spies!, Phineas and Ferb, Johnny Test, The Snoopy Show) and voice actor (voice of Buford Van Stormm in Phineas and Ferb).
- Mike Jones, American screenwriter and journalist (Pixar).
- Martin Sherman, American actor (voice of Thomas, Percy, and Diesel in Thomas & Friends, Hu-Hu and Piorno in Spirit of the Forest).
- David Mendenhall, American actor (voice of Daniel Witwicky in The Transformers, Krys in Rainbow Brite and the Star Stealer, Brother Bear in The Berenstain Bears, Zorn in Galtar and the Golden Lance, Big Chip in the Potato Head Kids segment of My Little Pony 'n Friends, Joey in the Kangaroo segment of Saturday Supercade, Terry in Puff and the Incredible Mr. Nobody).

== Deaths ==
=== February ===
- February 1: Bob Hilliard, American lyricist (Walt Disney Animation Studios), dies at age 53.
- February 5: Ramey Idriss, American songwriter, author, composer and musician (co-wrote The Woody Woodpecker Song), dies at age 59.
- February 20: William Lava, American composer (Looney Tunes, The Pink Panther), dies at age 59.

=== March ===
- March 12: Roy Glenn, American actor (voice of Br'er Frog in Song of the South, Uncle Tom in Uncle Tom's Bungalow), dies from a heart attack at age 56.

=== May ===
- May 8: Larry Morey, American lyricist and screenwriter (Walt Disney Animation Studios), dies at age 66.

=== June ===
- June 29: Joseph Rosenberg, Hungarian-American bank executive (approved loans to the Walt Disney Animation Studios and influenced the animation studio's decision making, approved loans for the production of Snow White and the Seven Dwarfs, issued a 1941 ultimatum which restricted the Disney studio to only produce new animation shorts and to finish the animated features which were already in production, with no other new productions allowed), dies at age 89.

=== July ===
- July 6: Louis Armstrong, American jazz trumpeter, composer and singer (appeared as a giant floating head in the Betty Boop cartoon I'll Be Glad When You're Dead You Rascal You), dies at age 69.
- July 7: Ub Iwerks, American animator, cartoonist, character designer, inventor, and special effects technician (designed Mickey Mouse, Clarabelle Cow, and Horace Horsecollar, creator of Flip the Frog and Willie Whopper, founder of Iwerks Studio, chief animator on the Laugh-O-Gram Studio, worked on the Alice Comedies, Oswald the Lucky Rabbit, Silly Symphony, ComiColor Cartoons, Looney Tunes, and Color Rhapsody series, special visual effects artist for Song of the South), dies at age 70.
- July 15: Bill Thompson, American actor (voice of Droopy, Adolf Wolf in Blitz Wolf, White Rabbit and Dodo in Alice in Wonderland, Mr. Smee in Peter Pan, Jock, Bull, Dachsie, Joe the cook and the Irish policeman in Lady and the Tramp, King Hubert in Sleeping Beauty, Ranger J. Audubon Woodlore in Humphrey the Bear cartoons, Professor Owl in Melody and Toot Whistle Plunk and Boom, Uncle Waldo in The Aristocats, Tom's cousin George in the Tom & Jerry short Timid Tabby, Touché Turtle in Touché Turtle and Dum Dum), dies at age 58.
- July 17: Cliff Edwards, American singer, musician and actor (voice of Jiminy Cricket in Pinocchio, Fun and Fancy Free and From All of Us to All of You, and Jim Crow in Dumbo), dies at age 76 from cardiac arrest.

=== August ===
- August 26: Julius Svendsen, Norwegian-American comics artist and animator (Walt Disney Animation Studios), dies at age 51 or 52.

=== September ===
- September 7: Spring Byington, American actress (model for Merryweather in Sleeping Beauty), dies at age 84.
- September 16: William Garity, American inventor and audio engineer (Fantasound), dies at age 72.
- September 23: Billy Gilbert, American comedian and actor (voice of Sneezy in Snow White and the Seven Dwarfs and Willie the Giant in Fun and Fancy Free), dies at age 77.

=== October ===
- October 9: Billy Costello, American actor (original voice of Popeye), dies at age 73.
- October 25: Paul Terry, American cartoonist, screenwriter, film director and film producer (Terrytoons, Farmer Alfalfa, Mighty Mouse, Heckle and Jeckle, Deputy Dawg), dies at age 84.
- October 31: Robert Gribbroek, American animator, lay-out artist and background painter (Warner Bros. Cartoons), dies at age 65.

=== December ===
- December 13: Warren Foster, American screenwriter, animator and composer (Fleischer Studios, Warner Bros Cartoons, Hanna-Barbera), dies at age 67.
- December 20: Roy O. Disney, American businessman (co-founder and first CEO of the Walt Disney Company) and brother of Walt Disney, dies at age 78 from an intracranial hemorrhage.
- December 28: Burt Gillett, American animator and film director (Walt Disney Company, The Van Beuren Corporation, Walter Lantz Productions), dies at age 80 from a heart attack.

== See also ==
- 1971 in anime
