= List of animated feature films of 1971 =

This is a list of animated feature films first released in 1971.

== List ==
Title	Country	Director	Production company	Animation technique	Format	Notes	Release date	Duration
Ali Baba and the Forty Thieves アリババと40匹の盗賊 (Ari Baba to Yonjuppiki no Tōzoku)	Japan	Hiroshi Shidara	Toei Animation	Traditional	Theatrical		July 18, 1971	55 minutes
Animal Treasure Island どうぶつ宝島 (Dōbutsu Takarajima)	Japan	Hiroshi Ikeda	Toei Animation	Traditional	Theatrical		March 20, 1971	78 minutes
Attack No. 1: Immortal Bird アタック No.1涙の不死鳥 (Atakku Nanbā Wan: Namida no Fushichou)	Japan	Eiji Okabe	Tokyo Movie Shinsha	Traditional	Theatrical		March 17, 1971	50 minutes
Bedknobs and Broomsticks	United States	Robert Stevenson	Walt Disney Productions	Traditional/Live action	Theatrical; Live-action animated film		December 13, 1971	118 minutes
Benny's Bathtub; Bennys badekar	Denmark	Jannik Hastrup; Flemming Quist Møller	Fiasco Film	Traditional	Theatrical		March 6, 1971	41 minutes
The Christmas Present; Presente de Natal	Brazil	Álvaro Henrique Gonçalves	Alvaro Henriques Gonçalves Produções Cinematográfi	Traditional	Theatrical		July 15, 1971	75 minutes
Daisy Town	France; Belgium	René Goscinny	Belvision Studios	Traditional	Theatrical		December 15, 1971	71 minutes
Do It! Yasuji's Pornorama ヤスジのポルノラマ やっちまえ!! (Yasuji no Pornorama Yacchimae!!)	Japan	Takanori Miwa; Shinichiro Takakuwa	Nippon Herald Films; Tokyo TV Video	Traditional	Theatrical		September 24, 1971	101 minutes
Here Comes Peter Cottontail	United States; Japan	Jules Bass; Arthur Rankin Jr.	Rankin/Bass; Video Tokyo Production	Stop motion	Television special		April 4, 1971	55 minutes
The Legend of Robin Hood	Australia	Zoran Janjic	Air Programs International	Traditional	Television film	Originally aired as the fourth installment of the CBS animated anthology series Famous Classic Tales (1970–1984).	November 14, 1971	47 minutes
Lightning Atom 번개아텀 (Beongae Ateom)	South Korea	Yongyusu	Segi Trading Co., Ltd.	Traditional	Theatrical		July 23, 1971	80 minutes
Ninpuu Kamui Gaiden: Tsukihigai no Maki 忍風カムイ外伝 月日貝の巻 (The Chronicles of Kamui the Ninja: The Moon Shell Volume)	Japan	Keisuke Kondo	Tele-Cartoon Japan	Traditional	Theatrical	Film compiled from episodes 21 ("Onna Zaemon") and 26 ("Jūmonji Tsuyu Kudushi") of the animated television series that ran from April 6 until September 28, 1969, for a total of 26 episodes.	March 20, 1971	88 minutes
The Point!	United States	Fred Wolf	Murakami-Wolf Productions; ABC	Traditional	Television film		February 2, 1971	74 minutes
The Poor Miller's Boy and the Kitten; Der arme Müllerbursch und das Kätzchen	East Germany	Lothar Barke; Helmut Barkowsky		Traditional	Theatrical	Produced from 1966 to 1970, released in 1971.	June 18, 1971	53 minutes
Prince Ho-Dong and Princess Nak-Rang 왕자호동과 낙랑공주 (Wangjahodonggwa Nangnanggongju)	South Korea	Yongyusu	Segi Trading Co., Ltd.	Traditional	Theatrical		January 1, 1971	75 minutes
The Return of Lightning Atom 돌아온 번개아톰 (Do-ra-on beon-gae-a-tom)	South Korea	Yongyusu	Segi Trading Co., Ltd.	Traditional	Theatrical		1971	80 minutes
Tiki Tiki	Canada	Gerald Potterton		Traditional	Theatrical; Live-action animated film	Original animation intercut with recontextualized footage from the 1966 Russian live action film Aybolit-66.	September 25, 1971	71 minutes
Treasure Island	Australia	Zoran Janjic	Air Programs International	Traditional	Television film	Originally aired as the fifth installment of the CBS animated anthology series Famous Classic Tales (1970–1984).	November 28, 1971	45 minutes
The Wardrobe of Time; El armario del tiempo	Spain	Rafael Vara	Estudios Vara; Vincit Films; Compañía Española de Propaganda, Industria y Cinematografía S.A. (CEPICSA); Tándem Films	Traditional	Theatrical	Third compilation film of the Spanish animated television series Mortadelo y Filemón (1966–1971), that ran for 23 6-minute installments and was based on the comic strip of the same title by Francisco Ibáñez.	November 29, 1971	78 minutes

== See also ==
- List of animated television series of 1971
