= 1971 in anime =

The events of 1971 in anime.

== Releases ==
English name	Japanese name	Type	Demographic	Regions
Hyppo and Thomas	カバトット (Kaba Totto)	TV	Children	JA
Hans Christian Andersen	アンデルセン物語 (Anderusen Monogatari)	TV	Family, Children	JA, NA, EU
Chingō Muchabei	珍豪ムチャ兵衛 (Chingo Muchabei)	TV	Shōnen	JA
Attack No. 1: Immortal Bird	アタック No.1涙の不死鳥 (Atakku Nanbā Wan: Namida no Fushichou)	Movie	Shōjo	JA
Animal Treasure Island	どうぶつ宝島 (Dōbutsu Takarajima)	Movie	Family, Children	JA
The Demon of Kickboxing	キックの鬼ー (Kikku no Oni)	Movie	Shōnen	JA
Animentary: The Decision	アニメンタリー 決断 - Ketsudan	TV	General	JA
Wandering Sun	さすらいの太陽 (Sasurai no Taiyō)	TV	Shōjo	JA
Ali Baba and the Forty Thieves	アリババと40匹の盗賊 (Ari Baba to Yonjuppiki no Tōzoku)	Movie	Family, Children	JA
New Q-Taro the Ghost	新オバケのQ太郎 (Shin Obake no Q-Tarō)	TV	Children	JA
The Genius Bakabon	天才バカボン (Tensai Bakabon)	TV	Shōnen	JA
The Instructive Trip Around the World	世界ものしり旅行 (Sekai Monoshiri Ryoko)	TV	General	JA
Marvelous Melmo	ふしぎなメルモ (Fushigi na Merumo)	TV	Shōjo	JA
Hela Supergirl	さるとびエッちゃん (Sarutobi Ecchan)	TV	Shōjo	JA
Apache Baseball Team	アパッチ野球軍 (Apache Yakyugun)	TV	Shōnen	JA
Kunimatsu's Got It Right!	国松さまのお通りだい (Kunimatsu-sama no Otoridai)	TV	Shōnen	JA
Spooky Kitaro	ゲゲゲの鬼太郎 (GeGeGe no Kitarō)	TV	Shōnen	JA
Lupin the 3rd	ルパン三世 (Rupan Sansei)	TV	Seinen	JA
Ryu the Primitive Boy	原始少年リュウ (Genshi Shōnen Ryu)	TV	Shōnen	JA
New Skyers 5	新スカイヤーズ5 (Shin Skyers 5)	TV	Shōnen	JA

== See also ==
- 1971 in animation
