= The Mysterious Cities of Gold: Secret Paths =

2013 video game

- Developer: Neko Entertainment
- Publisher: Ynnis Interactive
- Director: Jean-Luc François
- Producers: Cédric Littardi; Fleur Marty; Rémy Stieglitz
- Writer: Didier Lejeune
- Composer: Marie Muller
- Platforms: Windows, Wii U, Nintendo 3DS, iOS, Android
- Release: November 21, 2013 (digital)
- Genres: Puzzle, stealth
- Mode: Single-player

The Mysterious Cities of Gold: Secret Paths (French: Les Mystérieuses Cités d'Or: Mondes Secrets) is a game developed by Neko Entertainment and published by Ynnis Interactive, relating the events told in the 2012 television series The Mysterious Cities of Gold.

The game is available digitally on PC, iOS, Android, Wii U and Nintendo 3DS, and in retail in some European countries on PC and Nintendo 3DS.

== Gameplay ==
The game is composed of puzzles and infiltration sequences. The player must take advantage of the characters' skills: Esteban (unlocking mechanisms with the power of the sun), Zia (slipping into narrow spaces) and Tao (decrypting Mu language and sending Pichu retrieving distant objects).

In the iOS and Android mobile versions, the game is presented in episodic format, with each episode being sold separately after the first five as in-app purchases.

== Story ==
Six months after discovering the first golden city in Central America, and back to Barcelona, Esteban, Zia and Tao are looking for the missing six cities. Aboard their Great Condor and accompanied by Pichu, Mendoza, Pedro and Sancho, they embark to Asia, specifically to China and Tibet. They are followed by Zares, a mysterious stranger in the pay of the King of Spain, who is determined to prevent the children from accomplishing their quest.

== Financing ==
In September 2013, Ynnis Interactive completed a crowdfunding campaign on Kickstarter, earning $46,680 (on a $30,000 goal) in one month, in order to fund an English dubbing, and subtitling of the game in most European languages and Arabic. On November 7, The Mysterious Cities of Gold: Secret Paths received public subsidies in the amount of €120,000 (or $157,000) from CNC, as a "Help to the creation of intellectual property".

== Reception ==
Critics' responses were mixed. Metacritic shows an average of 60/100 across a total of seven reviews, indicating mixed or average reviews. The major French site Jeuxvideo.com talks about "relatively interesting puzzles" but concludes "the whole thing lacks fun".
