= The Mysterious Cities of Gold (2012 TV series) =

French animated TV series

- Cover of the 2014 Region 2 English DVD release of the second season
- Genre: Historical; Fantasy; Adventure
- Created by: Hadrien Soulez Larivière
- Directed by: Jean-Luc François
- Voices of: Audrey Pic; Adeline Chetail; Caroline Mozzone; Jérémy Prévost; Martial Le Minoux
- Composer: Noam Kaniel
- Countries of origin: France; Belgium; Portugal
- No. of seasons: 3
- No. of episodes: 78

Production
- Running time: approx. 22–23 minutes
- Production companies: Blue Spirit; Movie Plus; Be-Films; Sinématik

Original release
- Network: La Trois (Belgium); TF1 (France, seasons 2-3); Canal Panda (Portugal)
- Release: November 17, 2012 – February 12, 2021

Related
- The Mysterious Cities of Gold (1982–83)

The Mysterious Cities of Gold (French: Les Mystérieuses Cités d'Or) is an animated series that serves as a sequel to, and a continuation of, the original 1982 anime television series of the same name. The series premiered on La Trois in Belgium on November 17, 2012.

== Characters ==
The main cast of the series includes:

- Esteban (voiced by Audrey Pic): An orphan who was rescued at sea as a baby twelve years ago by the Spanish navigator Mendoza, he wears one of the two sun medallions. He dreams of adventure and is extremely impulsive. Esteban has a fear of heights which is confounded by the people of Barcelona who believe him to be the "Child of the Sun" and hoist him up high at the port to call out the sun to aid the departing ships. He joins the Spaniards in their search for one of The Seven Cities of Gold in the New World, hoping to find his father.
- Zia (voiced by Adeline Chetail): The daughter of an Inca high priest, she was kidnapped from Peru five years ago, when she was seven, by the Spanish invaders and given as a present to the Queen of Spain for her daughter, Princess Margarita. She met Esteban when she was kidnapped by Mendoza for Governor Pizarro who wanted her to read the golden quipu. Zia wears a sun medallion like Esteban's, with an interlocking sun and moon disc.
- Tao (voiced by Caroline Mozzone): The last living descendant of the sunken empire of Mu, he lived alone on the Galápagos Islands following the death of his father. Initially he is cautious of the others' company when they wash up on his island, but when the ship Solaris is revealed he joins them on their journey.
- Juan Carlos Mendoza (voiced by Bruno Magne): A Spaniard and navigator for the Spanish fleet, he rescued a young Esteban from a shipwreck during one of his voyages. An experienced sailor, a proficient navigator and a master swordsman, Mendoza places himself in the role of a leader. It is not always clear, however, where his loyalties lie and he is often at odds with the other characters. He is accompanied by two mercenaries: Sancho and Pedro. Mendoza has spent many years searching for information about the Mysterious Cities of Gold, which eventually led him to the sun medallions, one of which he took from Esteban when rescuing him for safe keeping.

== Episodes ==
=== Season 1 ===
Episodes 1 and 2 were shown on 9 November 2013 as a premiere double bill edition. They were repeated on 11 and 12 November at 6pm on Pop Max before continuing on a daily basis every weekday until the end of the series.

No. in season	English title	Original title	Original release date	UK airdate
1	"Back To Barcelona: Episode 1"	Retour à Barcelone 1re partie	17 November 2012 (La Trois)	9 November 2013; 11 November 2013 (repeat)
2	"Back To Barcelona: Episode 2"	Retour à Barcelone 2e partie	24 November 2012 (La Trois)	9 November 2013; 12 November 2013 (repeat)
3	"The Secret of the Drum"	Le secret du tambour	23 March 2013 (La Trois)	13 November 2013
4	"In The Hands of the Pirates"	Aux mains des pirates	30 March 2013 (La Trois & RTS Deux)	14 November 2013
5	"The Alchemist"	L'alchimiste	31 March 2013 (RTS Deux)	15 November 2013
6	"All Aboard!"	À l'abordage !	31 March 2013 (RTS Deux)	18 November 2013
7	"Shaolin"	Shaolin	1 April 2013 (RTS Deux)	19 November 2013
8	"The Treason"	La trahison'	27 April 2013 (La Trois)	20 November 2013
9	"The Prophecy"	La prophétie	4 May 2013 (La Trois)	21 November 2013
10	"The Black Pearl"	La perle noire	11 May 2013 (La Trois)	22 November 2013
11	"In Search of the Yellow Dragon"	À la recherche du dragon jaune	18 May 2013 (La Trois)	25 November 2013
12	"In the Forbidden City"	Dans la Cité Interdite	25 May 2013 (La Trois)	26 November 2013
13	"Like a Prince"	Comme un prince	1 June 2013 (La Trois)	27 November 2013
14	"The Escape"	L'évasion	8 June 2013 (La Trois)	28 November 2013
15	"The Stomach of Buddha"	Le ventre de Bouddha	25 August 2013 (La Trois)	29 November 2013
16	"The Labyrinth"	Le labyrinthe	1 September 2013 (La Trois)	2 December 2013
17	"The Sleeping Garden"	Le jardin endormi	8 September 2013 (La Trois)	3 December 2013
18	"The Son of the Sun"	Le fils du soleil	15 September 2013 (La Trois)	4 December 2013
19	"The Oasis"	L'oasis	22 September 2013 (La Trois)	5 December 2013
20	"The Fresco of the Evil Eyes"	La fresque des yeux maudits	29 September 2013 (La Trois)	6 December 2013
21	"The Separation"	La séparation	6 October 2013 (La Trois)	9 December 2013
22	"The Fire of the Dragon"	Le feu du dragon	13 October 2013 (La Trois)	10 December 2013
23	"The Expedition"	L'expédition	20 October 2013 (La Trois)	11 December 2013
24	"The Nest of the Condor"	Le nid du Condor	27 October 2013 (La Trois)	12 December 2013
25	"The Revelation"	La révélation	3 November 2013 (La Trois)	13 December 2013
26	"Face To Face"	Face à face	10 November 2013 (La Trois)	13 December 2013

=== Season 2 ===
No. in season	English title	Original title	Australian airdate	Original release date	UK airdate
1	"Kagoshima"	Kagoshima	24 September 2018	12 October 2016	23 September 2019
After leaving China under the threat of Zares, Esteban and his friends finally arrive in Japan. They must find the third City of Gold against which the infamous Zarès promises to release Athanaos, the father of Esteban.
2	"The Daimyo Shimadzu"	Le Daimyo Shimazu	24 September 2018	12 October 2016	23 September 2019
The one who attacks Esteban, Tao and Zia is Yoshi, an old man who keeps fiercely the impressive Orichalcum sphere. Yoshi reveals to the children that it is a utsuro bune, a sacred object, rejected by the sea thousands of years ago and revered since as a gift of the gods.
3	"The Golden Bird"	Le Grand Oiseau d'or	25 September 2018	13 October 2016	24 September 2019
Using his gift to make the sun reappear, Esteban allows Zia to take off in the Condor. Under the astonished eyes of Yoshi, the immense golden bird finally emerges from the waves. Mendoza, Sancho and Pedro manage to escape from the castle.
4	"The Anger Of Nao No Kami"	La Colère du Naï No Kami	25 September 2018	13 October 2016	24 September 2019
Near the temple of Izumo, the children succeed in extracting Esteban from the water, but attract the attention of one of the guards who go after them. Within the walls of the temple, they finally see the mirror shield out for the parade, but an earthquake creates panic.
5	"The Mirror-Shield"	Le Bouclier miroir	26 September 2018	14 October 2016	25 September 2019
Inside the temple, the shield-mirror leaves the children perplexed: according to the silhouette in the utsuro bune, it is the path and the key to the next golden city. They realize then that the ornaments of the mirror represent a volcano, off Kagoshima.
6	"The Return Of Zares"	Le Retour de Zarès	26 September 2018	14 October 2016	25 September 2019
At night, as Ichiro goes to take his guard duty at the castle, Esteban follows him and tries to convince him to help him to escape Mendoza and his men. Ichiro refuses, reminding Esteban how his presence and those of his friends already endangers his whole family.
7	"The Sabre Of The Samurai"	Le Sabre du samouraï	27 September 2018	17 October 2016	26 September 2019
Mendoza and his men takes control of the nave and makes the prisoners Gaspard and Ambrosius. They spot the Condor and rediscover the children who introduce Yoshi and his family. Mendoza reveals to them the betrayal of Ambrosius who delivered them to Shimazu: Esteban and Zia are stunned but Tao does not believe it at all. He wants Mendoza to keep Ambrosius prisoner.
8	"Unmasked"	Quand le masque tombe	27 September 2018	17 October 2016	26 September 2019
Mendoza narrowly escapes Ambrosius' attack. The latter claims that it was Mendoza who assaulted him, but he loses his compass, which Esteban picks up and tends to him by reflex. Suddenly, the young boy realizes that this compass should be in the possession of Zares, who stole it from Ichiro.
9	"The Thallios"	Le Thallios	28 September 2018	18 October 2016	27 September 2019
In the center of the cave, at the top of a pyramid, our heroes discover a sphere of orichalcum floating on a lake. Attacked by thousands of giant crabs, they manage to take refuge inside. They are also surprised to find the emblem of the Shimazu but realize that it is just the shape of the key that they have recovered on his saber. By placing it on, they activate what turns out to be a ship with the shape of a nauplius sailing underwater, the Thallios.
10	"Sundagatt"	Sûndagatt	28 September 2018	18 October 2016	27 September 2019
In the treasure chamber of the Golden City, the crowns found by our heroes allow the wearer to control the orichalcum cubes by thought. As Estéban goes to look for Tao in the Thallios to show him their discovery, he passes by the statue: he seizes the crystal pearl.
11	"The Shadows Of The Jungle"	Les Ombres de la jungle	1 October 2018	19 October 2016	30 September 2019
Zarès manages to escape with the crown and the crystal pearl. Aboard the Condor, Esteban explains his plan to his friends. He arranges for Zarès to take the crystal pearl that has guided the Thallios to the golden city. With a little luck, she will guide the Condor in the same way towards Zarès and her nave, so they can follow him to his landmark. It is perhaps there that he retains Athanaos.
12	"The Memorial Temple"	Le Temple mémoire	1 October 2018	19 October 2016	30 September 2019
The mysterious pursuers turn out to be children whose parents were abducted by the men of Ambrosius to work forcibly at the Fort of Pattala. When they learn that our heroes are not friends of Ambrosius and that Esteban's father is also a prisoner, they decide to unite their strength to deliver them all.
13	"Laguerra"	Laguerra	2 October 2018	20 October 2016	1 October 2019
At the fort of Pattala, Esteban is spotted by Ambrosius. When escaping, he sees his father in a cell but must flee because he is persecuted by Laguerra, the right arm of Ambrosius, and the guards of the palace.
14	"The Order Of The Hourglass"	L'Ordre du Sablier	2 October 2018	20 October 2016	1 October 2019
Tao is now in the hands of Ambrosius. The latter tries to return to his good graces, but Tao sees him as a traitor and refuses to trust him. Tao soon discovers the laboratory of Ambrosius and is impressed by all that it reveals to him.
15	"Ambrosius' Secret"	Le Secret d'Ambrosius	3 October 2018	21 October 2016	2 October 2019
Following the plans of Ambrosius, Laguerra and the soldiers find only a deserted village. Laguerra spots the children hidden in the trees. She hesitates, but does not denounce them and leaves without saying anything with her men in direction of the fort. Reluctant, but not trusting Laguerra, Mendoza decides that they must act fast.
16	"The Black Suns"	Les Soleils noirs	3 October 2018	21 October 2016	2 October 2019
While in the village, the children try to repair the Condor, Pichu sent by Tao finds them and deliver them a message from Atanaos. He reveals that the Rajah was drugged by Ambrosius. Recognizing a drug in his country, Zia tries to make an antidote that will make her lucidity to the Raja. If they manage to administer him, he and his guards will turn against Ambrosius.
17	"Free!"	Libres!	4 October 2018	24 October 2016	3 October 2019
The fort is taken by assault from all sides: the villagers, Tao and Atanaos are freed. Esteban manages to inject the antidote to the Raja who regains his spirits and realizes the betrayal of Ambrosius. To escape the soldiers of the Rajah, Ambrosius uses the black suns that trigger a fire in the fort.
18	"Hormuz"	Ormuz	4 October 2018 (and Singapore)	24 October 2016	3 October 2019
Esteban spends his own time with his father Athanaos finally found. This one reveals to him well to know Ambrosius, to have been his friend when they were young. For their part, Zia and Tao discover in the Memory Temple a key clue in the search for the fourth golden city.
19	"A New Beginning"	Un nouveau depart	5 October 2018 (and Singapore)	25 October 2016	4 October 2019
The heroes are surrounded by a troop of Bedouins. Their intrigued chief observes the medallion and then returns it to Zia apologizing for the young thief: a Bedouin never flies. When the children leave, he asks the young boy to follow them to find out what they are doing in Ormuz.
20	"The Mountain Of The Moon"	La Montagne de la lune	5 October 2018 (and Singapore)	25 October 2016	4 October 2019
On board the condor, Esteban is worried about what happened to Mendoza and his men, but his friends remind him that Mendoza is resourceful and their priority is to prevent Ambrosius from appropriating the muen knowledge and make it Weapons of war like the black suns.
21	"Up Is The Way Down"	En remontant, tu descendras	8 October 2018 (and Singapore)	26 October 2016	7 October 2019
The children finally manages to penetrate inside the ziggurat. They start their descent in search of the sacred sails of Princess Rana'Ori in the bowels of the pyramid, where, according to the inscription discovered in India, they shall be found.
22	"The Lord Of The Desert"	Le Seigneur du desert	8 October 2018 (and Singapore)	26 October 2016	7 October 2019
Zarès aided by Laguerra captures the children and pushes them towards the exit, revealing to them that he possesses, anyway, another track towards the fourth city of gold. They just need them and their medallions to open it.
23	"The Veils Of Rana'Ori"	Les Voiles de Rana'Ori	9 October 2018 (and Singapore)	27 October 2016	8 October 2019
In the desert, the suspected noises heard are produced by none other than Sancho and Pedro lost in the dunes. They finally found their friend Mendoza. In Manfuha, the children try to leave the oasis to reach the Condor, but the compass they steal from Zarès detects something. They discover in the treasure room of Jabbar a box containing the sails of Rana'Ori.
24	"The Chaldean Desert"	Le Désert des Chaldis	9 October 2018 (and Singapore)	27 October 2016	8 October 2019
The children reach the Great Condor thanks to Laguerra who confronts the soldiers alone at the risk of his life. Despite the reluctance of Tao, they return to collect it and make it climb aboard. Under the fire of the defensive guns of the fort, they manage with the Condor to recover the box containing the sails.
25	"The Serpent And The Lion"	Le Serpent et le Lion	10 October 2018 (and Singapore)	28 October 2016	9 October 2019
The Bedouin chief presents to the children the second veil they were looking for, transmitted from generation to generation by the Chaldis tribe. They try to read a plan to the city of gold, but the sails do not reveal anything.
26	"Kumlar"	Kûmlar	10 October 2018 (and Singapore)	28 October 2016	9 October 2019
On board the nave, Laguerra prevents Gaspard from killing Mendoza, arguing that Mendoza will be more useful to their living plan than dead. The children enter the city in search of the tomb of Princess Rana'Ori, but the sumptuous city seems deserted.

=== Season 3 ===
No. in season	English title	Original title	Original release date
1	"Lalibela"	Lalibela	TBA
2	"The dream of Zia"	Le rêve de Zia	TBA
3	"Chained"	Enchaînés	TBA
4	"The Great Escape"	La grande évasion	TBA
5	"The Door of the Ancients"	La porte des Anciens	TBA
6	"The Founder"	Le fondateur	TBA
7	"The Roaring Smoke"	La fumée qui gronde	TBA
8	"Ophir"	Ophir	TBA
9	"The Stone of Eternity"	La pierre d'éternité	TBA
10	"The Lady who Smiles"	La dame qui sourit	TBA
11	"The Bako"	Le Bako	TBA
12	"Farewell Master!"	Adieu Maître !	TBA
13	"The Night of the Masks"	La nuit des masques	TBA
14	"The Spirits' Cliff"	La falaise aux esprits	TBA
15	"The Witch"	La sorcière	TBA
16	"Orunigi"	Orunigi	TBA
17	"Revelations"	Révélations	TBA
18	"Beyond the Mirror"	Au-delà du miroir	TBA
19	"Fallen from the sky"	Tombés du ciel	TBA
20	"The Sacrifice"	Le sacrifice	TBA
21	"Hand in Hand"	Main dans la main	TBA
22	"The Gate to Hell"	La porte de l'enfer	TBA
23	"The Last of the Atlanteans"	Le dernier des Atlantes	TBA
24	"Revenge"	Vengeance	TBA
25	"The 7th City of Gold"	La 7ème Cité d'or	TBA
26	"End of the Adventure?"	Fin de l'aventure?	TBA

== Broadcast ==
The English version premiered on Pop Max on November 9, 2013. Fabulous Films released it on DVD and Blu-ray on February 17, 2014, in the UK. In 2016, the second season was made and released in France, and subsequently released in English in Australia in 2018. Season three was broadcast in French on RTS Un, but has yet to receive an English dub.

== Reception ==
The show was perceived as losing its identity and untrue to the original, generally badly received by critics such as Starburst and HuffPost.

== Video game ==
A video game called The Mysterious Cities of Gold: Secret Paths for Windows (available on Steam), Wii U, Nintendo 3DS and iOS based on the show was published by Ynnis Interactive.
