= Chingō Muchabei =

Japanese manga series

Chingō Muchabei (Japanese: 珍豪ムチャ兵衛, transl. Unusual Muchabei). Is a Japanese manga series by Keiji Morita and Genkotsu Production, and a television anime series based on it. The anime series aired from February 15, 1971, to March 22, 1971, on TBS, it is also known as the last animated television series to be broadcast in black and white.

== Synopsis ==
This gag manga is set in the Edo era of Japan, shortly after the Tokugawa shogunate's pacification. A ronin named Muchabei lives in a tenement house and, despite his poverty, raises a boy named Bokemaru, who is said to be a descendant of the Toyotomi family, in an attempt to restore the Toyotomi lineage.

== Characters ==
- Muchabei (voiced by Masashi Amemori) The main character of this story, He usually carries around an umbrella around his waist, which he wields like a Japanese sword to defeat enemies.
- Bokemaru (voiced by Machiko Soga) Muchabei's son, his catchphraise is "~ぞよ"

== Broadcast ==
It was broadcast on TBS Television from February 15, 1971, to March 22, 1971, as a daily program.

This series is the last black-and-white television animated series to be broadcast. In fact, it was originally shelved in 1968 due to color television becoming more popular in Japan. However, three years later, it suddenly saw the light of day, when most television programs had been colorized. In terms of production year, Umeboshi Denka which was also broadcast on TBS in 1969, and Mōretsu Atarō (the first series, which was in black and white until the broadcast on September 25, 1970), which was broadcast on NET (now known as TV Asahi), were produced later, but this series was broadcast after them.

After being broadcast on TBS, it was also rebroadcast on Aomori Television later in 1971.
