= Lists of anime =

Anime (Japanese: アニメ, IPA: [aꜜɲime] ^{ⓘ}) is hand-drawn and computer-generated animation originating from Japan. However, outside of Japan and in English, anime refers specifically to the animation produced exclusively in Japan. However, in Japan and in Japanese, anime is generally described as all animated works in Japan, regardless of style, type or origin.

These lists of anime serve to provide an organized and methodological approach for finding related content about anime topics.

== By year ==
- List of anime by release date (pre-1939)
- List of anime by release date (1939–1945)
- List of anime by release date (1946–1959)
- List of years in anime—A table form for individual years in anime

== Genres ==
These lists are not all inclusive, each list contains works that are representative of the genre.

- List of adventure anime
- List of comedy anime
- List of cooking anime and manga
- List of drama anime
- List of fantasy anime
- List of harem anime and manga
- List of hentai anime
- List of horror anime
- List of isekai works
- List of mecha anime
- List of mystery anime
- List of romance anime
- List of science fiction anime
- List of slice of life anime
- List of sports anime and manga
- List of yaoi anime and manga
- List of yuri anime and manga

== Lists of companies ==
- List of anime companies
- List of Japanese animation studios

== Anime aired by company ==
- List of anime broadcast by Fuji TV
- List of anime broadcast by Nippon TV
- List of anime broadcast by TBS Television (Japan)
- List of anime broadcast by NHK
- List of anime broadcast by Tokyo MX
- List of anime broadcast by TV Asahi
- List of anime broadcast by TV Tokyo

== Other ==
- List of anime series considered the best
- List of anime based on video games
- List of anime conventions
- List of anime distributed in the United States
- List of anime franchises by episode count
- List of anime releases made concurrently in the United States and Japan
- List of anime series by episode count
- Lists of anime and manga characters
- List of bisexual characters in anime
- List of gay characters in anime
- List of highest-grossing anime films
- List of lesbian characters in anime
- Lists of animated films
- Lists of animated television series
