= List of anime broadcast by Fuji Television =

This article lists anime series that have aired on Fuji Television and its affiliates. Instant History was the first anime originally aired on Fuji TV.

== Current ==
Title	Premiere date
Sazae-san	October 5, 1969
Chibi Maruko-chan	January 8, 1995
One Piece	October 20, 1999
Paper Rabbit Rope	November 16, 2012
Bonobono	April 2, 2016
Chiikawa	April 4, 2022
Tōsōchū: The Great Mission	April 2, 2023
Dragon Ball Daima	October 11, 2024
Honey Lemon Soda	January 9, 2025

== 1960s ==
Title	Premiere date	End date
Instant History	May 1, 1961	February 24, 1962
Tetsuwan Atom	January 1, 1963	December 31, 1966
Sennin Buraku	September 4, 1963	February 23, 1964
Tetsujin 28-go	October 20, 1963	May 25, 1966
Dolphin Prince	April 4, 1965	April 18, 1965
Space Ace	May 8, 1965	April 28, 1966
Planet Boy Papi	June 3, 1965	May 27, 1966
W3	June 6, 1965	June 27, 1966
Jungle Emperor	October 6, 1965	September 28, 1966
Harris no Kaze	May 5, 1966	August 31, 1967
Robotan	October 1, 1966	September 27, 1968
New Jungle Emperor: Move Ahead Leo!	October 5, 1966	March 29, 1967
Gokū no Daibōken	January 7, 1967	September 30, 1967
Mach GoGoGo	April 2, 1967	March 31, 1968
Ribbon no Kishi	April 2, 1967	April 7, 1968
Chibikko Kaiju Yadamon	October 2, 1967	March 25, 1968
Oraa Guzura Dado	October 7, 1967	September 25, 1968
GeGeGe no Kitarō	January 3, 1968	March 30, 1969
Akane-chan	April 4, 1968	September 29, 1968
Dokachin	October 2, 1968	March 26, 1969
Humanoid Monster Bem	October 7, 1968	March 31, 1969
Undersea Marine Boy	January 13, 1969	September 22, 1969
Judo Boy	April 2, 1969	September 24, 1969
Dororo	April 6, 1969	September 28, 1969
Moomin	October 5, 1969	December 27, 1970
Attack No. 1	December 7, 1969	November 28, 1971

== 1970s ==
Title	Network	Premiere date	End date
Ashita no Joe	Fuji TV	April 1, 1970	September 29, 1971
The Adventures of Hutch the Honeybee	Fuji TV	April 7, 1970	September 8, 1971
Inakappe Taishō	Fuji TV	October 4, 1970	September 24, 1972
Norakuro	Fuji TV	October 5, 1970	March 29, 1971
Kaba Totto	Fuji TV	January 1, 1971	September 30, 1972
Andersen Monogatari	Fuji TV	January 3, 1971	December 26, 1971
Wandering Sun	Fuji TV	April 8, 1971	September 30, 1971
Kunimatsu-sama no Otoridai!	Fuji TV	October 6, 1971	September 25, 1972
GeGeGe no Kitarō	Fuji TV	October 7, 1971	September 28, 1972
Mokku of the Oak Tree	Fuji TV	January 4, 1972	December 26, 1972
New Moomin	Fuji TV	January 9, 1972	December 31, 1972
Science Ninja Team Gatchaman	Fuji TV	October 1, 1972	September 29, 1974
Hazedon	Fuji TV	October 5, 1972	March 29, 1973
Tamagon the Counselor	Fuji TV	October 5, 1972	September 28, 1973
Mazinger Z	Fuji TV	December 3, 1972	September 1, 1974
Demetan Croaker, The Boy Frog	Fuji TV	January 2, 1973	September 25, 1973
Fables of the Green Forest	Fuji TV	January 7, 1973	December 30, 1973
Little Wansa	Kansai TV	April 2, 1973	September 24, 1973
Kōya no Shōnen Isamu	Fuji TV	April 4, 1973	March 27, 1974
Zero Tester	Kansai TV	October 1, 1973	December 30, 1974
Neo-Human Casshern	Fuji TV	October 2, 1973	June 25, 1974
Dororon Enma-kun	Fuji TV	October 4, 1973	March 28, 1974
Heidi, Girl of the Alps	Fuji TV	January 6, 1974	December 29, 1974
Chiisana Viking Bikke	Fuji TV	April 3, 1974	September 24, 1975
Getter Robo	Fuji TV	April 4, 1974	May 8, 1975
Great Mazinger	Fuji TV	September 8, 1974	September 28, 1975
Urikupen Kyūjotai	Fuji TV	September 30, 1974	March 29, 1975
Tentōmushi no Uta	Fuji TV	October 6, 1974	September 26, 1976
Dog of Flanders	Fuji TV	January 5, 1975	December 28, 1975
La Seine no Hoshi	Fuji TV	April 4, 1975	December 26, 1975
Getter Robo G	Fuji TV	May 15, 1975	March 25, 1976
Iruka to Shōnen	Fuji TV	July 30, 1975	August 15, 1975
Arabian Nights: Sinbad's Adventures	Fuji TV	October 1, 1975	September 29, 1976
Time Bokan	Fuji TV	October 4, 1975	December 25, 1976
UFO Robot Grendizer	Fuji TV	October 5, 1975	February 27, 1977
Huckleberry no Bōken	Fuji TV	January 2, 1976	June 25, 1976
3000 Leagues in Search of Mother	Fuji TV	January 4, 1976	December 26, 1976
Gaiking	Fuji TV	April 1, 1976	January 27, 1977
Blocker Gundan 4 Machine Blaster	Fuji TV	July 5, 1976	March 28, 1977
Hoka Hoka Kazoku	Fuji TV	October 1, 1976	March 31, 1982
Paul's Miraculous Adventure	Fuji TV	October 3, 1976	September 11, 1977
Dokaben	Fuji TV	October 6, 1976	December 26, 1979
Yatterman	Fuji TV	January 1, 1977	January 27, 1979
Rascal the Raccoon	Fuji TV	January 2, 1977	December 25, 1977
Jetter Mars	Fuji TV	February 3, 1977	September 15, 1977
Wakusei Robo Danguard Ace	Fuji TV	March 6, 1977	March 26, 1978
Attack on Tomorrow!	Fuji TV	April 4, 1977	September 5, 1977
Ore wa Teppei	Fuji TV	September 12, 1977	March 27, 1978
Ippatsu Kanta-kun	Fuji TV	September 18, 1977	September 24, 1978
Arrow Emblem: Hawk of the Grand Prix	Fuji TV	September 22, 1977	August 31, 1978
Fūsen Shōjo Tenpuru-chan	Fuji TV	October 1, 1977	March 25, 1978
Yakyū-kyō no Uta	Fuji TV	December 23, 1977	March 26, 1979
The Story of Perrine	Fuji TV	January 1, 1978	December 31, 1978
Starzinger	Fuji TV	April 2, 1978	August 24, 1979
Ikkyū-san	Fuji TV	April 10, 1978	October 23, 1978
Galaxy Express 999	Fuji TV	September 14, 1978	March 26, 1981
King Fang	Fuji TV	September 23, 1978	
Science Ninja Team Gatchaman II	Fuji TV	October 1, 1978	September 23, 1979
Anne of Green Gables	Fuji TV	January 7, 1979	December 30, 1979
Zenderman	Fuji TV	February 3, 1979	January 26, 1980
Ganbare! Bokura no Hit and Run	Fuji TV	February 18, 1979	
Maegami Taro	Fuji TV	April 29, 1979	
Lupin the Thief: Enigma of the 813	Fuji TV	May 5, 1979	
Tondemo Nezumi Daikatsuyaku	Fuji TV	June 30, 1979	
King Arthur and the Knights of the Round Table	Fuji TV	September 9, 1979	March 3, 1980
Jean Valjean Monogatari	Fuji TV	September 15, 1979	
Anne no Nikki: Anne Frank Monogatari	Fuji TV	September 28, 1979	
Science Ninja Team Gatchaman F	Fuji TV	October 7, 1979	August 31, 1980
Ashinaga Ojisan	Fuji TV	October 10, 1979	

== 1980s ==
Title	Premiere date	End date
The Adventures of Tom Sawyer	January 6, 1980	December 28, 1980
Maeterlinck's Blue Bird: Tyltyl and Mytyl's Adventurous Journey	January 9, 1980	July 9, 1980
Rescueman	February 2, 1980	January 31, 1981
Back to the Forest	February 3, 1980	
King Arthur: Prince on White Horse	April 6, 1980	September 21, 1980
Fisherman Sanpei	April 7, 1980	July 28, 1982
Wakakusa Monogatari	May 3, 1980	
Bōchan	June 13, 1980	
Ganbare Genki	July 16, 1980	April 1, 1981
Muteking, The Dashing Warrior	September 7, 1980	September 27, 1981
Ojamanga Yamada-kun	September 28, 1980	October 10, 1982
Nijū-yon no Hitomi	October 10, 1980	
Arano no Sakebi Koe: Howl, Buck	January 3, 1981	
The Swiss Family Robinson: Flone of the Mysterious Island	January 4, 1981	December 27, 1981
Yattodetaman	February 7, 1981	February 6, 1982
Hashire Melos!	February 7, 1981	
Dr. Slump - Arale-chan	April 8, 1981	February 19, 1986
Queen Millennia	April 16, 1981	March 25, 1982
Lupin tai Holmes	May 5, 1981	
Sugata Sanshirō	June 8, 1981	
Kabo-Encho no Dobutsuen Nikki	August 23, 1981	
Bokura Mangaka: Tokiwa-so Monogatari	October 3, 1981	
Dash Kappei	October 4, 1981	December 26, 1982
Honey Honey no Suteki na Bouken	October 7, 1981	May 1, 1982
Urusei Yatsura	October 14, 1981	March 19, 1986
Lucy-May of the Southern Rainbow	January 10, 1982	December 26, 1982
Gyakuten! Ippatsuman	February 13, 1982	March 26, 1983
I Am a Cat	February 17, 1982	
Patalliro!	April 8, 1982	May 13, 1983
Scientific Rescue Team TechnoBoyager	April 17, 1982	September 11, 1982
Little Pollon	May 8, 1982	March 26, 1983
Son Goku: Silk Road o Tobu!!	June 17, 1982	
Adrift in the Pacific	August 22, 1982	
Shonen Miyamoto Musashi: Winpaku Nito-ryu	October 6, 1982	
Space Adventure Cobra	October 7, 1982	May 19, 1983
Mirai Keisatsu Urashiman	January 9, 1983	December 24, 1983
Story of the Alps: My Annette	January 9, 1983	December 25, 1983
I Am a Dog: The Life of Don Matsugoro	February 9, 1983	
Miyuki	March 31, 1983	April 20, 1984
Nanako SOS	April 2, 1983	December 24, 1983
Itadakiman	April 9, 1983	September 24, 1983
Nine	May 4, 1983	
Stop!! Hibari-kun!	May 20, 1983	January 27, 1984
Doctor Mambo & Kaito Jibako: Uchu Yori Ai no Komete!!	September 12, 1983	
Genesis Climber MOSPEADA	October 2, 1983	March 23, 1984
Special Armored Battalion Dorvack	October 7, 1983	July 6, 1984
Nine 2: Sweetheart Declaration	December 18, 1983	
Okawari-Boy Starzan S	January 7, 1984	August 25, 1984
Katri, Girl of the Meadows	January 8, 1984	December 23, 1984
Gu Gu Ganmo	March 18, 1984	March 17, 1985
Chikkun Takkun	April 9, 1984	September 28, 1984
Noozles	July 7, 1984	December 28, 1984
Ginga Patrol PJ	June 17, 1984	August 22, 1984
Nine: Final	September 5, 1984	
Futari Daka	September 20, 1984	June 21, 1985
Mori no Tonto Tachi	October 5, 1984	March 29, 1985
Fist of the North Star	October 11, 1984	March 5, 1987
Princess Sara	January 6, 1985	December 29, 1985
Touch	March 24, 1985	March 22, 1987
Honō no Alpen Rose: Judy & Randy	April 6, 1985	October 5, 1985
High School! Kimengumi	October 12, 1985	September 26, 1987
GeGeGe no Kitarō (series 3)	October 12, 1985	March 21, 1988
The Story of Pollyanna, Girl of Love	January 12, 1986	December 28, 1986
Attention Students! A Green Neckerchief for Your Hearts	February 23, 1986	
Dragon Ball	February 26, 1986	April 19, 1989
Maison Ikkoku	March 26, 1986	March 2, 1988
Coral Reef Legend: Elfie of the Blue Sea	August 22, 1986	
Anmitsu Hime: From Amakara Castle	October 5, 1986	September 27, 1987
Tales of Little Women	January 11, 1987	December 27, 1987
Fist of the North Star 2	March 13, 1987	February 18, 1988
Hiatari Ryōkō!	March 22, 1987	March 20, 1988
Norakuro-Kun	October 4, 1987	October 2, 1988
Tsuide ni Tonchinkan	October 10, 1987	October 1, 1988
The Story of Fifteen Boys	October 19, 1987	
Little Prince Cedie	January 10, 1988	December 25, 1988
Osomatsu-kun	February 13, 1988	December 30, 1989
Sakigake!! Otokojuku	February 25, 1988	November 14, 1988
Kiteretsu Daihyakka	March 27, 1988	June 9, 1996
Himitsu no Akko-chan (series 2)	October 9, 1988	December 24, 1989
The Adventures of Peter Pan	January 15, 1989	December 24, 1989
Ranma ½	April 15, 1989	September 16, 1989
Dragon Ball Z	April 26, 1989	January 31, 1996
Kariage-kun	October 17, 1989	December 21, 1990
Magical Hat	October 18, 1989	July 6, 1990
Ranma ½: Nettohen	October 20, 1989	September 25, 1992
Dragon Quest	December 2, 1989	April 5, 1991

== 1990s ==
Title	Premiere date	End date
Heisei Tensai Bakabon	January 6, 1990	December 29, 1990
Chibi Maruko-chan	January 7, 1990	September 27, 1992
My Daddy Long Legs	January 14, 1990	December 23, 1990
Chokkaku, the Stubborn Samurai Boy	January 5, 1991	October 12, 1991
Trapp Family Story	January 13, 1991	December 28, 1991
High School Mystery: Gakuen Nanafushigi	April 12, 1991	March 13, 1992
Marude Dameo	November 2, 1991	September 26, 1992
The Bush Baby	January 12, 1992	December 20, 1992
Nontan to Issho	October 5, 1992	March 18, 1993
Yu Yu Hakusho	October 10, 1992	January 7, 1995
Fatal Fury: Legend of the Hungry Wolf	December 23, 1992	
Little Women II: Jo's Boys	January 17, 1993	December 19, 1993
Fatal Fury 2: The New Battle	July 31, 1993	
Aoki Densetsu Shoot!	November 7, 1993	December 25, 1994
Battle Spirits: Ryuuko no Ken	December 23, 1993	
Oyako Club	October 3, 1994	March 30, 2013
Captain Tsubasa J	October 21, 1994	December 22, 1995
Tico of the Seven Seas	January 16, 1994	December 18, 1994
Ninku	January 14, 1995	February 24, 1996
Romeo and the Black Brothers	January 15, 1995	December 17, 1995
GeGeGe no Kitarō (series 4)	January 7, 1996	March 29, 1998
Rurouni Kenshin	January 10, 1996	September 8, 1998
Famous Dog Lassie	January 14, 1996	August 18, 1996
Dragon Ball GT	February 7, 1996	November 19, 1997
Midori no Makibaō	March 2, 1996	July 12, 1997
KochiKame	June 16, 1996	December 19, 2004
Remi, Nobody's Girl	September 1, 1996	March 23, 1997
Chūka Ichiban!	April 27, 1997	September 13, 1998
Flame of Recca	July 19, 1997	July 10, 1998
Dr. Slump	November 26, 1997	September 22, 1999
Himitsu no Akko-chan (series 3)	April 5, 1998	February 28, 1999
Initial D: First Stage	April 18, 1998	December 5, 1998
Super Milk Chan	June 18, 1998	September 24, 1998
Hanasaka Tenshi Ten-Ten-kun	October 10, 1998	September 25, 1999
Dokkiri Doctor	October 21, 1998	June 23, 1999
Digimon Adventure	March 7, 1999	March 26, 2000
Turn A Gundam	April 9, 1999	April 14, 2000
Great Teacher Onizuka	June 30, 1999	September 24, 2000
Initial D: Second Stage	October 14, 1999	January 6, 2000
Hunter × Hunter	October 16, 1999	March 31, 2001

== 2000s ==
Title	Premiere date	End date
Shippu! Iron Leaguer	April 2, 2000	April 29, 2001
Digimon Adventure 02	April 2, 2000	March 25, 2001
Ghost Stories	October 22, 2000	March 25, 2001
Digimon Tamers	April 1, 2001	March 31, 2002
PaRappa the Rapper	April 14, 2001	January 11, 2002
Himitsu no Akko-Chan	May 6, 2001	March 31, 2002
Hellsing	October 10, 2001	January 16, 2002
Vampiyan Kids	October 13, 2001	March 30, 2002
RahXephon	January 21, 2002	September 11, 2002
Kanon	January 31, 2002	March 28, 2002
Digimon Frontier	April 7, 2002	March 30, 2003
Ai Yori Aoshi	April 11, 2002	September 26, 2002
Hungry Heart: Wild Striker	September 11, 2002	September 10, 2003
Gravion	October 7, 2002	December 16, 2002
Kiddy Grade	October 8, 2002	March 18, 2003
Haibane Renmei	October 9, 2002	December 18, 2002
Wolf's Rain	January 6, 2003	July 29, 2003
L/R: Licensed by Royalty	January 9, 2003	March 27, 2003
Konjiki no Gash Bell!!	April 6, 2003	March 26, 2006
Astro Boy: Mighty Atom	April 6, 2003	March 28, 2004
Texhnolyze	April 16, 2003	September 24, 2003
Gad Guard	April 17, 2003	December 30, 2003
R.O.D the TV	October 1, 2003	March 16, 2004
The Galaxy Railways	October 4, 2003	April 4, 2004
Gunslinger Girl	October 9, 2003	February 19, 2004
Chrono Crusade	November 24, 2003	June 10, 2004
Gravion Zwei	January 8, 2004	March 25, 2004
Legendz	April 4, 2004	March 27, 2005
Gantz	April 12, 2004	November 18, 2004
Samurai Champloo	May 19, 2004	March 19, 2005
Girls Bravo	July 6, 2004	September 28, 2004
Honey and Clover	April 14, 2005	September 26, 2005
Paradise Kiss	October 13, 2005	December 29, 2005
Mushishi	October 22, 2005	June 19, 2006
Digimon Savers	April 2, 2006	March 25, 2007
Jyu-Oh-Sei	April 13, 2006	June 22, 2006
Honey and Clover II	June 29, 2006	September 14, 2006
Hataraki Man	October 13, 2006	December 22, 2006
Afro Samurai	January 4, 2007	February 1, 2007
Nodame Cantabile	January 11, 2007	June 26, 2007
Getsumento Heiki Mina	January 13, 2007	March 24, 2007
GeGeGe no Kitarō	April 1, 2007	March 29, 2009
Skull Man	April 28, 2007	July 22, 2007
Mononoke	July 12, 2007	September 27, 2007
Moyasimon: Tales of Agriculture	October 12, 2007	December 21, 2007
Nodame Cantabile: Paris-Hen	October 9, 2008	December 18, 2008
Michiko to Hatchin	October 15, 2008	March 18, 2009
Dragon Ball Z Kai	April 5, 2009	March 27, 2011
Eden of the East	April 9, 2009	June 18, 2009
Tokyo Magnitude 8.0	July 9, 2009	September 17, 2009

== 2010s ==
Title	Premiere date	End date
Nodame Cantabile: Finale	January 14, 2010	March 25, 2010
Katanagatari	January 26, 2010	December 11, 2010
House of Five Leaves	April 15, 2010	July 1, 2010
The Tatami Galaxy	April 22, 2010	July 1, 2010
Shiki	July 8, 2010	December 30, 2010
Princess Jellyfish	October 15, 2010	December 31, 2010
Fractale	January 13, 2011	March 31, 2011
Wandering Son	January 13, 2011	March 31, 2011
Toriko	April 3, 2011	March 30, 2014
Anohana: The Flower We Saw That Day	April 14, 2011	June 23, 2011
C	April 14, 2011	June 24, 2011
Bunny Drop	July 7, 2011	September 15, 2011
NO.6	July 7, 2011	September 15, 2011
Un-Go	October 13, 2011	December 22, 2011
Guilty Crown	October 13, 2011	March 22, 2012
Thermae Romae	January 12, 2012	January 26, 2012
Black Rock Shooter	February 2, 2012	March 22, 2012
Kids on the Slope	April 12, 2012	June 28, 2012
Tsuritama	April 12, 2012	June 28, 2012
Moyasimon Returns	July 5, 2012	September 13, 2012
Natsuyuki Rendezvous	July 6, 2012	September 14, 2012
Psycho-Pass	October 12, 2012	March 22, 2013
Robotics;Notes	October 12, 2012	March 22, 2013
Tetsujin 28-go Gao!	April 6, 2013	March 26, 2016
Silver Spoon	July 11, 2013	March 27, 2014
Lovely Movie: Lovely Muuuuuuuco!	July 29, 2013	December 23, 2013
Galilei Donna	October 10, 2013	December 19, 2013
Samurai Flamenco	October 10, 2013	March 27, 2014
Oniku Daisuki! Zeushi-kun	January 6, 2014	March 24, 2014
Dragon Ball Z Kai	April 6, 2014	June 28, 2015
Nanana's Buried Treasure	April 10, 2014	June 19, 2014
Ping Pong the Animation	April 11, 2014	June 20, 2014
Nanana's Buried Treasure	April 11, 2014	June 19, 2014
Lovely Movie: Lovely Muuuuuuuco! (Season 2)	April 27, 2014	October 5, 2014
Zankyou no Terror	July 10, 2014	September 25, 2014
Nobunaga Concerto	July 12, 2014	September 20, 2014
Your Lie in April	October 9, 2014	March 19, 2015
Psycho-Pass 2	October 10, 2014	December 19, 2014
Saekano	January 8, 2015	March 27, 2015
Assassination Classroom	January 9, 2015	June 30, 2016
Saenai Heroine no Sodatekata	January 9, 2015	June 23, 2017
Punch Line	April 9, 2015	June 25, 2015
Ganbare-bu Next!	June 7, 2015	July 12, 2015
Rampo Kitan: Game of Laplace	July 2, 2015	September 17, 2015
Dragon Ball Super	July 5, 2015	March 25, 2018
Subete ga F ni Naru	October 8, 2015	December 17, 2015
Boku Dake ga Inai Machi	January 8, 2016	March 25, 2016
Kabaneri of the Iron Fortress	April 8, 2016	June 30, 2016
Battery	July 14, 2016	September 22, 2016
Monster Hunter Stories	October 2, 2016	April 1, 2018
The Great Passage	October 14, 2016	December 23, 2016
Scum's Wish	January 12, 2017	March 30, 2017
Flat	April 14, 2017	June 23, 2017
Dive!!	July 6, 2017	September 21, 2017
Inuyashiki	October 12, 2017	December 22, 2017
After the Rain	January 12, 2018	March 30, 2018
GeGeGe no Kitarō	April 1, 2018	March 29, 2020
Layton's Mystery Journey	April 8, 2018	March 31, 2019
Wotakoi: Love Is Hard for Otaku	April 13, 2018	June 22, 2018
Banana Fish	July 5, 2018	December 20, 2018
Ingress: The Animation	October 18, 2018	December 27, 2018
Revisions	January 10, 2019	March 28, 2019
The Promised Neverland (Season 1)	January 11, 2019	March 29, 2019
Carole & Tuesday	April 11, 2019	October 3, 2019
Sarazanmai	April 11, 2019	June 20, 2019
Given	July 11, 2019	September 29, 2019
Beastars (Season 1)	October 8, 2019	December 26, 2019
Psycho-Pass 3	October 24, 2019	December 12, 2019

== 2020s ==
Title	Premiere date	End date
Drifting Dragons	January 9, 2020	March 26, 2020
Uchitama?! Have you seen my Tama?	January 10, 2020	March 20, 2020
Digimon Adventure	April 5, 2020	September 26, 2021
BNA: Brand New Animal	April 8, 2020	June 24, 2020
The Millionaire Detective - Balance: UNLIMITED	April 10, 2020	September 24, 2020
Great Pretender	June 2, 2020	September 21, 2020
Beastars (Season 2)	January 7, 2021	March 25, 2021
2.43: Seiin High School Boys Volleyball Team	January 8, 2021	March 26, 2021
The Promised Neverland (Season 2)	January 8, 2021	March 26, 2021
Backflip!!	April 9, 2021	June 25, 2021
Cestvs: The Roman Fighter	April 15, 2021	June 24, 2021
Night Head 2041	July 15, 2021	September 30, 2021
The Idaten Deities Know Only Peace	July 23, 2021	October 1, 2021
Digimon Ghost Game	October 3, 2021	March 26, 2023
Muv-Luv Alternative (Season 1)	October 7, 2021	December 23, 2021
Demon Slayer: Kimetsu no Yaiba (Season 2)	October 10, 2021	February 13, 2022
Ranking of Kings	October 15, 2021	March 25, 2022
The Heike Story	January 13, 2022	March 24, 2022
I'm Kodama Kawashiri	January 14, 2022	August 12, 2022
Estab Life: Great Escape	April 7, 2022	June 23, 2022
Call of the Night	July 8, 2022	September 30, 2022
Mamekichi Mameko NEET no Nichijō	October 3, 2022	September 27, 2023
Muv-Luv Alternative (Season 2)	October 5, 2022	December 22, 2022
Eternal Boys	October 11, 2022	March 28, 2023
Urusei Yatsura	October 14, 2022	June 21, 2024
Kaina of the Great Snow Sea	January 12, 2023	March 23, 2023
Bosanimal	April 3, 2023	September 14, 2023
Demon Slayer: Kimetsu no Yaiba (Season 3)	April 9, 2023	June 18, 2023
Ranking of Kings: The Treasure Chest of Courage	April 14, 2023	June 16, 2023
Undead Girl Murder Farce	July 6, 2023	September 28, 2023
KamiErabi God.app	October 5, 2023	December 21, 2023
Metallic Rouge	January 11, 2024	April 4, 2024
Viral Hit	April 11, 2024	June 27, 2024
Demon Slayer: Kimetsu no Yaiba (Season 4)	May 12, 2024	June 30, 2024
Senpai Is an Otokonoko	July 5, 2024	September 27, 2024
KamiErabi God.app (Season 2)	October 3, 2024	December 19, 2024
