= List of anime broadcast by NHK =

This is a list of past and current anime that aired on NHK.

== TV series (current) ==
Title	Premiere date
Nintama Rantarō	April 10, 1993
Ojarumaru	October 5, 1998
Kingdom	June 4, 2012
Tsurune	October 22, 2018
Welcome to Demon School! Iruma-kun	October 5, 2019
To Your Eternity	April 12, 2021

== TV series (all) ==
=== 1970s–90s ===
Title	Premiere date	End date
Future Boy Conan	April 4, 1978	October 31, 1978
Captain Future	November 7, 1978	December 18, 1979
Esteban Child of the Sun	May 1, 1982	February 5, 1983
Nadia: The Secret of Blue Water	April 13, 1990	April 12, 1991
Robin Hood no Daibōken	July 29, 1990	October 28, 1991
Anime Himitsu no Hanazono	April 19, 1991	March 27, 1992
Azuki-chan	April 4, 1995	March 17, 1998
Cinderella Monogatari	April 4, 1996	October 3, 1996
Kaiketsu Zorro	April 5, 1996	March 28, 1997
Alice SOS	April 6, 1998	January 28, 1999
Cardcaptor Sakura	April 7, 1998	March 21, 2000
Princess Nine	April 8, 1998	October 14, 1998
Corrector Yui	April 2, 1999	October 6, 2000

=== 2000s ===
Title	Premiere date	End date
The Candidate for Goddess	January 10, 2000	March 27, 2000
Baby Felix	October 8, 2000	June 29, 2001
Shingu: Secret of the Stellar Wars	May 8, 2001	December 4, 2001
Fighting Foodons	December 11, 2001	June 25, 2002
Deko Boko Friends	April 1, 2002	March 18, 2011
The Twelve Kingdoms	April 9, 2002	August 30, 2003
King of Bandit Jing	May 15, 2002	August 14, 2002
Princess Tutu	August 16, 2002	May 23, 2003
Petite Princess Yucie	September 30, 2002	March 24, 2003
Planetes	October 4, 2003	April 17, 2004
Uninhabited Planet Survive!	October 16, 2003	October 28, 2004
Twin Spica	November 1, 2003	March 27, 2004
Kyo Kara Maoh!	April 3, 2004	February 25, 2006
Hi no Tori	April 4, 2004	June 27, 2004
Tweeny Witches	April 9, 2004	March 4, 2005
Agatha Christie's Great Detectives Poirot and Marple	July 4, 2004	May 15, 2005
Gakuen Alice	October 30, 2004	May 14, 2005
Major	November 13, 2004	September 25, 2010
Tsubasa Chronicle	April 9, 2005	November 4, 2006
The Snow Queen	May 22, 2005	February 12, 2006
The Story of Saiunkoku	April 8, 2006	February 24, 2007
Emily of New Moon	April 7, 2007	September 29, 2007
Moribito: Guardian of the Spirit	April 7, 2007	September 29, 2007
Dennō Coil	May 12, 2007	December 1, 2007
Allison & Lillia	April 3, 2008	October 2, 2008
Telepathy Shōjo Ran	June 21, 2008	December 20, 2008
The Beast Player Erin	January 10, 2009	December 26, 2009
Guin Saga	April 5, 2009	September 27, 2009
Element Hunters	July 4, 2009	March 27, 2010
Kobato	October 6, 2009	March 23, 2010

=== 2010s ===
Title	Premiere date	End date
Giant Killing	April 4, 2010	September 26, 2010
Bakuman	October 2, 2010	March 30, 2013
Hyouge Mono	April 7, 2011	January 26, 2012
Baby Steps	April 6, 2014	September 20, 2015
Rin-ne	April 4, 2015	September 23, 2017
ClassicaLoid	October 8, 2016	March 24, 2018
March Comes in Like a Lion	October 8, 2016	March 31, 2018
Atom: The Beginning	April 15, 2017	July 8, 2017
Pingu in the City	October 7, 2017	March 30, 2019
Major 2nd	April 7, 2018	November 7, 2020
Piano no Mori	April 8, 2018	April 14, 2019
Tsukumogami Kashimasu	July 22, 2018	October 14, 2018
Attack on Titan (Season 3)	July 23, 2018	July 1, 2019
Radiant	October 6, 2018	February 26, 2020
Mobile Suit Gundam: The Origin - Advent of the Red Comet	April 29, 2019	August 12, 2019
Vinland Saga (season 1)	July 7, 2019	December 29, 2019

=== 2020s ===
Title	Premiere date	End date
Keep Your Hands Off Eizouken!	January 5, 2020	March 22, 2020
Attack on Titan (Season 4/Final Season)	December 7, 2020	November 5, 2023
