= List of anime broadcast by Nippon Television =

This is a list of present and upcoming anime on the Nippon Television network.

== TV series (current) ==
Title	Network	Premiere date
Soreike! Anpanman	Nippon TV	October 3, 1988
Detective Conan	Yomiuri TV	January 8, 1996

== TV series (all) ==
=== 1960s—70s ===
Title	Network	Premiere date	End date
Tatakae! Osper	Nippon TV	December 14, 1965	October 31, 1967
Ōgon Bat	Yomiuri TV	April 1, 1967	March 23, 1968
Bōken Shōnen Shadar	Nippon TV	September 18, 1967	March 16, 1968
Star of the Giants	Yomiuri TV	March 30, 1968	September 18, 1971
Yuuyake Banchō	Nippon TV	September 30, 1968	March 29, 1969
Tiger Mask	Yomiuri TV	October 2, 1969	September 30, 1971
Akakichi no Eleven	Nippon TV	April 13, 1970	April 5, 1971
Shin Obake no Q-Tarō	Nippon TV	September 1, 1971	December 27, 1972
Tensai Bakabon	Yomiuri TV	September 25, 1971	June 24, 1972
Lupin III	Yomiuri TV	October 24, 1971	March 26, 1972
Seigi wo Ai Suru Mono: Gekkō Kamen	Nippon TV	January 10, 1972	October 2, 1972
Astroganger	Nippon TV	October 4, 1972	March 28, 1973
Doraemon	Nippon TV	April 1, 1973	September 30, 1973
Bōken Korobokkuru	Yomiuri TV	October 6, 1973	March 30, 1974
Space Battleship Yamato	Yomiuri TV	October 6, 1974	March 30, 1975
Gamba no Bouken	Nippon TV	April 7, 1975	September 29, 1975
Ganso Tensai Bakabon	Nippon TV	October 6, 1975	September 26, 1977
New Star of the Giants	Yomiuri TV	October 1, 1977	September 30, 1978
Nobody's Boy: Remi	Nippon TV	October 2, 1977	October 1, 1978
Lupin III	Nippon TV	October 3, 1977	October 6, 1980
Treasure Island	Nippon TV	October 8, 1978	April 1, 1979
Shin Ace o Nerae!	Nippon TV	October 14, 1978	March 31, 1979
Space Battleship Yamato II	Yomiuri TV	October 14, 1978	April 14, 1979
New Star of the Giants II	Yomiuri TV	April 14, 1979	September 29, 1979
The Rose of Versailles	Nippon TV	October 10, 1979	September 3, 1980
Space Carrier Blue Noah	Yomiuri TV	October 13, 1979	March 30, 1980

=== 1980s ===
Title	Network	Premiere date	End date
Astro Boy	Nippon TV	October 1, 1980	December 23, 1981
Shin Tetsujin-28	Nippon TV	October 3, 1980	September 25, 1981
Space Battleship Yamato III	Yomiuri TV	October 11, 1980	April 4, 1981
Ashita no Joe 2	Nippon TV	October 13, 1980	August 31, 1981
The Gutsy Frog	Nippon TV	September 7, 1981	March 29, 1982
Six God Combination Godmars	Nippon TV	October 2, 1981	December 24, 1982
Game Center Arashi	Nippon TV	April 5, 1982	September 27, 1982
Acrobunch	Nippon TV	May 5, 1982	December 24, 1982
Tokimeki Tonight	Nippon TV	October 7, 1982	September 22, 1983
Captain	Nippon TV	January 10, 1983	July 4, 1983
Kinnikuman	Nippon TV	April 3, 1983	October 1, 1986
Creamy Mami, the Magic Angel	Nippon TV	July 1, 1983	June 29, 1984
Serendipity the Pink Dragon	Nippon TV	July 1, 1983	December 23, 1983
Cat's Eye	Nippon TV	July 11, 1983	March 26, 1984
Igano Kabamaru	Nippon TV	October 20, 1983	March 29, 1984
Lupin the 3rd Part III	Yomiuri TV	March 3, 1984	November 6, 1985
Glass Mask	Nippon TV	April 9, 1984	September 27, 1984
God Mazinger	Nippon TV	April 15, 1984	September 30, 1984
Persia, the Magic Fairy	Nippon TV	July 6, 1984	May 31, 1985
Panzer World Galient	Nippon TV	October 5, 1984	March 29, 1985
Bismark	Nippon TV	October 7, 1984	September 29, 1985
Cat's Eye 2	Nippon TV	October 8, 1984	July 8, 1985
Magical Emi, the Magic Star	Nippon TV	June 7, 1985	February 28, 1986
Dirty Pair	Nippon TV	July 15, 1985	December 26, 1985
Blue Comet SPT Layzner	Nippon TV	October 3, 1985	June 26, 1986
Ninja Senshi Tobikage	Nippon TV	October 6, 1985	July 13, 1986
Robotan	Yomiuri TV	January 6, 1986	September 20, 1986
Pastel Yumi, the Magic Idol	Nippon TV	March 7, 1986	August 29, 1986
Animated Classics of Japanese Literature	Nippon TV	April 25, 1986	December 26, 1986
Bug tte Honey	Nippon TV	October 3, 1986	September 25, 1987
Bosco Adventure	Yomiuri TV	October 6, 1986	March 30, 1987
Doteraman	Nippon TV	October 14, 1986	February 24, 1987
Mock & Sweet	Nippon TV	October 15, 1986	October 4, 1987
Ganbare, Kickers!	Nippon TV	October 15, 1986	March 25, 1987
City Hunter	Yomiuri TV	April 6, 1987	March 28, 1988
Kimagure Orange Road	Nippon TV	April 6, 1987	March 7, 1988
Red Photon Zillion	Nippon TV	April 12, 1987	December 13, 1987
Transformers: The Headmasters	Nippon TV	July 3, 1987	March 25, 1988
Kamen no Ninja Akakage	Nippon TV	October 13, 1987	March 22, 1988
Tatakae!! Ramenman	Nippon TV	January 10, 1988	September 11, 1988
Moeru! Onii-san	Nippon TV	March 14, 1988	September 19, 1988
City Hunter 2	Yomiuri TV	April 2, 1988	July 1, 1989
Transformers: Super-God Masterforce	Nippon TV	April 12, 1988	March 7, 1989
Sonic Soldier Borgman	Nippon TV	April 13, 1988	December 21, 1988
Mashin Hero Wataru	Nippon TV	April 15, 1988	March 31, 1989
Oishinbo	Nippon TV	October 17, 1988	March 17, 1992
Transformers: Victory	Nippon TV	March 14, 1989	December 19, 1989
Miracle Giants Dome-kun	Nippon TV	April 2, 1989	March 25, 1990
Madö King Granzört	Nippon TV	April 7, 1989	March 2, 1990
Konchū Monogatari: Minashigo Hutch	Nippon TV	July 21, 1989	August 31, 1990
Mobile Police Patlabor	Nippon TV	October 11, 1989	September 29, 1990
Seton Dōbutsuki	Nippon TV	October 14, 1989	December 22, 1990
City Hunter 3	Yomiuri TV	October 15, 1989	January 21, 1990
YAWARA! a fasionable Judo Girl!	Yomiuri TV	October 16, 1989	September 21, 1992

=== 1990s ===
Title	Network	Premiere date	End date
Mashin Hero Wataru 2	Nippon TV	March 3, 1990	March 8, 1991
Karakuri Kengō Den Musashi Lord	Nippon TV	October 3, 1990	September 25, 1991
Mischievous Twins: The Tales of St. Clare's	Nippon TV	January 5, 1991	November 2, 1991
Future GPX Cyber Formula	Nippon TV	March 15, 1991	December 20, 1991
Chiisana Obake Acchi, Kocchi, Socchi	Nippon TV	April 9, 1991	March 31, 1992
City Hunter '91	Yomiuri TV	April 28, 1991	October 10, 1991
Magical Princess Minky Momo: Hold On to Your Dreams	Nippon TV	October 2, 1991	December 23, 1992
Kinnikuman: Kinniku-sei Ōi Sōdatsu-hen	Nippon TV	October 6, 1991	September 27, 1992
Watashi to Watashi: Futari no Lotte	Nippon TV	November 9, 1991	September 5, 1992
Mama wa Shōgaku 4 Nensei	Nippon TV	January 10, 1992	December 25, 1992
Chō Dendō Robo Tetsujin 28-go FX	Nippon TV	April 5, 1992	March 30, 1993
My Patrasche	Nippon TV	October 10, 1992	March 27, 1993
Kobo-chan	Nippon TV	October 19, 1992	March 21, 1994
Miracle Girls	Nippon TV	January 8, 1993	December 24, 1993
Red Baron	Nippon TV	April 5, 1994	March 28, 1995
DNA²	Nippon TV	October 7, 1994	December 23, 1994
Magic Knight Rayearth	Yomiuri TV	October 17, 1994	November 27, 1995
Street Fighter II V	Yomiuri TV	April 10, 1995	November 27, 1995
Gambalist! Shun	Yomiuri TV	July 1, 1996	March 10, 1997
Kindaichi Shōnen no Jikenbo	Yomiuri TV	April 7, 1997	September 11, 2000
Berserk	Nippon TV	October 8, 1997	April 1, 1998
Master Keaton	Nippon TV	October 6, 1998	March 30, 1999

=== 2000s ===
Title	Network	Premiere date	End date
Hidamari no Ki	Nippon TV	April 4, 2000	September 19, 2000
Hajime no Ippo	Nippon TV	October 4, 2000	March 27, 2002
InuYasha	Yomiuri TV	October 16, 2000	September 13, 2004
Kaze no Yojimbo	Nippon TV	October 2, 2001	March 19, 2002
Tenchi Muyo! GXP	Nippon TV	April 3, 2002	September 25, 2002
Hanada Shōnen Shi	Nippon TV	October 1, 2002	March 25, 2003
Air Master	Nippon TV	April 2, 2003	October 1, 2003
Space Pirate Captain Herlock	Nippon TV	October 7, 2003	December 31, 2003
The Gokusen	Nippon TV	January 7, 2004	March 31, 2004
Monster	Nippon TV	April 7, 2004	September 28, 2005
Otogi Zoshi	Nippon TV	July 6, 2004	March 29, 2005
Black Jack	Yomiuri TV	October 11, 2004	March 6, 2006
Ghost in the Shell: S.A.C. 2nd GIG	Nippon TV	April 5, 2005	September 27, 2005
Angel Heart	Yomiuri TV	October 3, 2005	September 25, 2006
Tohai Densetsu Akagi: Yami ni Maiorita Tensai	Nippon TV	October 4, 2005	March 28, 2006
Ouran High School Host Club	Nippon TV	April 5, 2006	September 26, 2006
Nana	Nippon TV	April 5, 2006	March 27, 2007
Black Jack 21	Yomiuri TV	April 10, 2006	September 4, 2006
Sasami: Magical Girls Club	Nippon TV	October 3, 2006	March 27, 2007
Death Note	Nippon TV	October 4, 2006	June 27, 2007
Neuro: Supernatural Detective	Yomiuri TV	October 16, 2006	February 11, 2008
Claymore	Nippon TV	April 4, 2007	September 26, 2007
Buzzer Beater II	Nippon TV	July 4, 2007	September 26, 2007
Neuro: Supernatural Detective	Nippon TV	October 2, 2007	March 25, 2008
Kaiji	Nippon TV	October 2, 2007	April 1, 2008
Yattermen!	Yomiuri TV	January 14, 2008	September 27, 2009
Red Drive	Nippon TV	April 8, 2008	October 1, 2008
Top Secret ~The Revelation~	Nippon TV	April 8, 2008	September 30, 2008
Mōryō no Hako	Nippon TV	October 7, 2008	December 30, 2008
One Outs	Nippon TV	October 7, 2008	December 30, 2008
Hajime no Ippo: New Challenger	Nippon TV	January 6, 2009	June 30, 2009
Sōten Kōro	Nippon TV	April 7, 2009	September 29, 2009
Inuyasha: The Final Act	Yomiuri TV	October 3, 2009	April 3, 2010
Yumeiro Patissiere	Yomiuri TV	October 4, 2009	December 26, 2010
Kimi ni Todoke	Nippon TV	October 6, 2009	March 30, 2010
Aoi Bungaku	Nippon TV	October 11, 2009	December 27, 2009

=== 2010s ===
Title	Premiere date	End date
Rainbow: Nisha Rokubō no Shichinin	April 6, 2010	September 28, 2010
Beelzebub	January 9, 2011	March 25, 2012
Chihayafuru	October 4, 2011	March 24, 2020
Yuruani?	April 12, 2011	September 13, 2011
Hunter × Hunter	October 2, 2011	September 24, 2014
Lupin the Third: The Woman Called Fujiko Mine	April 4, 2012	June 27, 2012
GJ Club	January 10, 2013	March 28, 2013
Gatchaman Crowds	July 12, 2013	September 28, 2013
Barakamon	July 6, 2014	September 27, 2014
Sengoku Basara: End of Judgement	July 6, 2014	September 27, 2014
Parasyte -the maxim-	October 9, 2014	March 26, 2015
Death Parade	January 9, 2015	March 27, 2015
Denpa Kyōshi	April 4, 2015	September 26, 2015
My Love Story!!	April 8, 2015	September 23, 2015
Gatchaman Crowds Insight	July 5, 2015	September 26, 2015
Lupin the 3rd Part IV: The Italian Adventure	October 1, 2015	March 17, 2016
Nurse Witch Komugi R	January 10, 2016	March 27, 2016
Poco's Udon World	October 9, 2016	December 25, 2016
Lupin the 3rd Part V: Misadventures in France	April 4, 2018	September 18, 2018
Real Girl	April 4, 2018	March 26, 2019
Mr. Tonegawa: Middle Management Blues	July 4, 2018	December 26, 2018
Mix	April 6, 2019	September 28, 2019

=== 2020s ===
Title	Premiere date	End date
Edens Zero (Season 1)	April 11, 2021	October 3, 2021
Lupin the 3rd Part 6	October 10, 2021	March 27, 2022
Frieren: Beyond Journey's End	September 29, 2023	March 22, 2024
Mobile Suit Gundam GQuuuuuuX	April 8, 2025	June 25, 2025

== Films and specials ==
- Undersea Super Train: Marine Express (August 26, 1979)
- Age of the Great Dinosaurs (October 7, 1979)
- Bremen 4: Angels in Hell (August 23, 1981)
- Andromeda Stories (August 22, 1982)
- A Time Slip of 10000 Years: Prime Rose (August 21, 1983)
- Bagi, the Monster of Mighty Nature (August 19, 1984)
- The Prince of Devil Island: The Three-Eyed One (August 25, 1985)
- Niji no Kanata e! Shōjo Diana-hi Monogatari (May 1, 1986)
- Galaxy Investigation 2100: Border Planet (August 24, 1986)
- Lupin III specials (since April 1, 1989)
- The Tezuka Osamu Story: I Am Son-goku (August 27, 1989)
- Time Patrol Bon (October 14, 1989)
- Like the Clouds, Like the Wind (March 21, 1990)
- Beyond the Tide of Time (June 16, 1991)
- Zukkoke Sanningumi: Kusunoki Yashiki no Guruguru-sama (November 11, 1995)
- City Hunter: The Secret Service (January 5, 1996)
- Yawara! Special - Zutto Kimi no Koto ga... (July 19, 1996)
- City Hunter: Goodbye My Sweetheart (April 25, 1997)
- City Hunter: Death of the Vicious Criminal Ryo Saeba (April 23, 1999)
