= List of anime broadcast by TV Asahi =

This is a list of anime broadcast by TV Asahi and its affiliates.

== TV series (current) ==
| Title | Network | Premiere date |
|---|---|---|
| Crayon Shin-chan | TV Asahi | April 13, 1992 |
| Doraemon | TV Asahi | April 15, 2005 |
| Medalist | TV Asahi | January 5, 2025 |
| You and Idol Pretty Cure | ABC | February 2, 2025 |
| Jigoku Sensei Nūbē | TV Asahi | July 2, 2025 |

== TV series (all) ==
=== 1960s ===
| Title | Network | Premiere date | End date |
|---|---|---|---|
| Wolf Boy Ken | TV Asahi | November 25, 1963 | August 16, 1965 |
| Shōnen Ninja Kaze no Fujimaru | TV Asahi | June 7, 1964 | August 31, 1965 |
| Hustle Punch | TV Asahi | November 1, 1965 | April 25, 1966 |
| Osomatsu-kun | MBS | February 5, 1966 | March 25, 1967 |
| Rainbow Sentai Robin | TV Asahi | April 23, 1966 | March 24, 1967 |
| Sally the Witch | TV Asahi | December 5, 1966 | December 30, 1967 |
| Cyborg 009 | TV Asahi | April 5, 1968 | September 27, 1968 |
| Sabu to Ichi Torimono Hikae | MBS | October 3, 1968 | September 24, 1969 |
| Himitsu no Akko-chan | TV Asahi | January 6, 1969 | October 26, 1970 |
| Mōretsu Atarō | TV Asahi | April 4, 1969 | December 25, 1970 |

=== 1970s ===
| Title | Network | Premiere date | End date |
|---|---|---|---|
| Mahō no Mako-chan | TV Asahi | November 2, 1970 | September 9, 1971 |
| Sarutobi Ecchan | TV Asahi | October 4, 1971 | March 27, 1972 |
| Mahōtsukai Chappy | TV Asahi | April 3, 1972 | December 2, 1972 |
| Devilman | TV Asahi | July 8, 1972 | April 7, 1973 |
| Babel II | TV Asahi | January 1, 1973 | September 24, 1973 |
| Jungle Kurobe | MBS | March 2, 1973 | September 28, 1973 |
| Microid S | TV Asahi | April 7, 1973 | October 6, 1973 |
| Miracle Girl Limit-chan | TV Asahi | October 1, 1973 | March 25, 1974 |
| Karate Baka Ichidai | TV Asahi | October 3, 1973 | September 25, 1974 |
| Aim for the Ace! | MBS | October 5, 1973 | March 29, 1974 |
| Cutie Honey | TV Asahi | October 13, 1973 | March 30, 1974 |
| Majokko Megu-chan | TV Asahi | April 1, 1974 | September 29, 1975 |
| New Honeybee Hutch | MBS | April 5, 1974 | September 27, 1974 |
| Hurricane Polymar | TV Asahi | October 4, 1974 | March 28, 1975 |
| Maya the Honey Bee | ABC | April 1, 1975 | April 20, 1976 |
| Brave Raideen | TV Asahi | April 4, 1975 | March 26, 1976 |
| First Human Giatrus | ABC | April 5, 1975 (Note: ABC switched affiliates from TBS to TV Asahi on March 31, 1975.) | March 27, 1976 |
| Tekkaman: The Space Knight | TV Asahi | July 2, 1975 | December 24, 1975 |
| Steel Jeeg | TV Asahi | October 5, 1975 | August 29, 1976 |
| The Adventures of Pepero | TV Asahi | October 6, 1975 | March 29, 1976 |
| Ikkyū-san | October 15, 1975 | June 28, 1982 | |
| Gowappa 5 Gōdam | ABC; TV Asahi | April 4, 1976 | December 29, 1976 |
| Chōdenji Robo Combattler V | TV Asahi | April 17, 1976 | May 28, 1977 |
| Piccolino no Bōken | ABC | April 27, 1976 | May 31, 1977 |
| Magne Robo Gakeen | TV Asahi | September 5, 1976 | June 26, 1977 |
| Candy Candy | TV Asahi | October 1, 1976 | February 2, 1979 |
| Little Lulu and Her Little Friends | ABC | October 3, 1976 | April 3, 1977 |
| Chōgattai Majutsu Robo Ginguiser | ABC | April 9, 1977 | October 22, 1977 |
| Chōdenji Machine Voltes V | TV Asahi | June 4, 1977 | March 25, 1978 |
| Seton Doubutsuki: Kuma no Ko Jacky | ABC | June 7, 1977 | December 6, 1977 |
| Chojin Sentai Balatack | TV Asahi | July 3, 1977 | March 26, 1978 |
| Invincible Super Man Zambot 3 | NBN | October 8, 1977 | March 25, 1978 |
| Wakakusa no Charlotte | ABC | October 29, 1977 | May 27, 1978 |
| Her Majesty's Petite Angie | ABC | December 13, 1977 | June 27, 1978 |
| Majokko Tickle | TV Asahi | March 6, 1978 | January 29, 1979 |
| Space Pirate Captain Harlock | TV Asahi | March 14, 1978 | February 13, 1979 |
| Tōshō Daimos | TV Asahi | April 1, 1978 | January 27, 1979 |
| Haikara-san ga Tōru | ABC | June 3, 1978 | March 31, 1979 |
| Invincible Steel Man Daitarn 3 | NBN | June 3, 1978 | March 31, 1979 |
| The Adventures of the Little Prince | ABC | July 4, 1978 | March 27, 1979 |
| Uchū Majin Daikengo | TV Asahi | July 27, 1978 | February 15, 1979 |
| Hana no Ko Lunlun | TV Asahi | February 9, 1979 | February 8, 1980 |
| Cyborg 009 | TV Asahi | March 6, 1979 | March 25, 1980 |
| Doraemon | TV Asahi | April 2, 1979 | March 18, 2005 |
| Mobile Suit Gundam | NBN | April 7, 1979 | January 26, 1980 |
| Seton Dobutsuki Risu no Banner | ABC | April 7, 1979 | September 29, 1979 |
| Misha the Little Bear | ABC | October 6, 1979 | April 5, 1980 |

=== 1980s ===
| Title | Network | Premiere date | End date |
|---|---|---|---|
| Invincible Robo Trider G7 | NBN | February 2, 1980 | January 24, 1981 |
| Lalabel, the Magical Girl | TV Asahi | February 15, 1980 | February 27, 1981 |
| Kaibutsu-kun | TV Asahi | September 2, 1980 | September 28, 1982 |
| Hello! Sandybell | TV Asahi | March 6, 1981 | February 26, 1982 |
| Tiger Mask II | TV Asahi | April 20, 1981 | January 18, 1982 |
| Ninja Hattori-kun | TV Asahi | September 28, 1981 | December 25, 1987 |
| Asari-chan | TV Asahi | January 25, 1982 | February 28, 1983 |
| Combat Mecha Xabungle | NBN | February 6, 1982 | January 29, 1983 |
| The Kabocha Wine | TV Asahi | July 5, 1982 | August 27, 1984 |
| Aura Battler Dunbine | NBN | February 5, 1983 | January 21, 1984 |
| Love Me, My Knight | TV Asahi | March 1, 1983 | January 24, 1984 |
| Perman | TV Asahi | April 4, 1983 | July 2, 1985 |
| Lady Georgie | ABC | April 9, 1983 | February 25, 1984 |
| Chō Kōsoku Galvion | TV Asahi | February 3, 1984 | June 29, 1984 |
| Heavy Metal L-Gaim | NBN | February 4, 1984 | February 23, 1985 |
| Dream Soldier Wing-Man | TV Asahi | February 7, 1984 | February 26, 1985 |
| Tongari Bōshi no Memoru | ABC | March 3, 1984 | March 3, 1985 |
| Choriki Robo Galatt | NBN | October 5, 1984 | April 5, 1985 |
| Galactic Patrol Lensman | ABC | October 6, 1984 | March 30, 1985 |
| Meitantei Holmes | TV Asahi | November 6, 1984 | May 21, 1985 |
| Mobile Suit Zeta Gundam | NBN | March 2, 1985 | February 22, 1986 |
| Obake no Q-Tarō | TV Asahi | April 1, 1985 | March 29, 1987 |
| Dream-Star Button Nose | ABC | October 19, 1985 | April 26, 1986 |
| Uchūsen Sagittarius | TV Asahi | January 10, 1986 | October 3, 1987 |
| Maple Town Stories | ABC | January 19, 1986 | January 11, 1987 |
| Mobile Suit Gundam ZZ | NBN | March 1, 1986 | January 31, 1987 |
| Silver Fang -The Shooting Star Gin- | TV Asahi | April 7, 1986 | September 22, 1986 |
| Hikari no Densetsu | ABC | May 3, 1986 | September 20, 1986 |
| Saint Seiya | TV Asahi | October 11, 1986 | April 1, 1989 |
| New Maple Town Stories: Palm Town Chapter | ABC | January 18, 1987 | December 27, 1987 |
| Metal Armor Dragonar | NBN | February 7, 1987 | January 30, 1988 |
| Ultra B | TV Asahi | April 4, 1987 | March 27, 1989 |
| Esper Mami | TV Asahi | April 7, 1987 | October 26, 1989 |
| Bikkuriman | TV Asahi | October 11, 1987 | April 2, 1989 |
| Grimm Masterpiece Theater | TV Asahi | October 21, 1987 | March 30, 1988 |
| Tsurupika Hagemaru-kun | TV Asahi | March 3, 1988 | October 6, 1989 |
| Ikinari Dagon | TV Asahi | April 9, 1988 | June 25, 1988 |
| Topo Gigio | ABC | April 27, 1988 | September 21, 1988 |
| Yoroiden Samurai Troopers | NBN | April 30, 1988 | March 4, 1989 |
| Ironfist Chinmi | TV Asahi | July 2, 1988 | December 24, 1988 |
| New Grimm Masterpiece Theater | ABC | October 2, 1988 | March 26, 1989 |
| Jushin Liger | NBN | March 11, 1989 | January 27, 1990 |
| Shin Bikkuriman | ABC | April 9, 1989 | August 26, 1990 |
| Akuma-kun | TV Asahi | April 15, 1989 | March 24, 1990 |
| Sally the Witch | TV Asahi | October 9, 1989 | September 23, 1991 |
| Chimpui | TV Asahi | November 2, 1989 | April 18, 1991 |

=== 1990s ===
| Title | Network | Premiere date | End date |
|---|---|---|---|
| Brave Exkaiser | NBN | February 3, 1990 | January 26, 1991 |
| Mōretsu Atarō | TV Asahi | April 21, 1990 | December 22, 1990 |
| Magical Taruruto-kun | ABC | September 9, 1990 | May 10, 1992 |
| Goldfish Warning! | TV Asahi | January 12, 1991 | February 29, 1992 |
| The Brave of Sun Fighbird | NBN | February 2, 1991 | February 1, 1992 |
| 21 Emon | TV Asahi | May 2, 1991 | March 26, 1992 |
| The Brave Fighter of Legend Da-Garn | NBN | February 8, 1992 | January 23, 1993 |
| Pretty Soldier Sailor Moon | TV Asahi | March 7, 1992 | February 27, 1993 |
| Cooking Papa | ABC | April 9, 1992 | May 25, 1995 |
| Super Bikkuriman | ABC | May 17, 1992 | April 4, 1993 |
| Nangoku Shōnen Papuwa-kun | TV Asahi | October 10, 1992 | October 2, 1993 |
| The Brave Express Might Gaine | NBN | January 30, 1993 | January 22, 1994 |
| Pretty Soldier Sailor Moon R | TV Asahi | March 6, 1993 | March 12, 1994 |
| Mobile Suit Victory Gundam | TV Asahi | April 2, 1993 | March 25, 1994 |
| Ghost Sweeper Mikami | ABC | April 11, 1993 | March 6, 1994 |
| Heisei Inu Monogatari Bow | TV Asahi | October 14, 1993 | September 22, 1994 |
| Slam Dunk | TV Asahi | October 16, 1993 | March 23, 1996 |
| The Brave Police J-Decker | NBN | February 5, 1994 | January 28, 1995 |
| Marmalade Boy | ABC | March 13, 1994 | September 3, 1995 |
| Pretty Soldier Sailor Moon S | TV Asahi | March 19, 1994 | February 25, 1995 |
| Mobile Fighter G Gundam | TV Asahi | April 22, 1994 | March 31, 1995 |
| Magical Circle Guru Guru | ABC | October 13, 1994 | September 14, 1995 |
| The Brave of Gold Goldran | NBN | February 4, 1995 | January 27, 1996 |
| Pretty Soldier Sailor Moon SuperS | TV Asahi | March 4, 1995 | March 2, 1996 |
| Mobile Suit Gundam Wing | TV Asahi | April 7, 1995 | March 29, 1996 |
| H2 | ABC | June 1, 1995 | March 21, 1996 |
| Neighborhood Story | ABC | September 10, 1995 | September 1, 1996 |
| Kaito Saint Tail | ABC | October 12, 1995 | September 12, 1996 |
| Brave Command Dagwon | NBN | February 3, 1996 | January 25, 1997 |
| Pretty Soldier Sailor Moon Sailor Stars | TV Asahi | March 9, 1996 | February 8, 1997 |
| After War Gundam X | TV Asahi | April 5, 1996 | December 28, 1996 |
| Jigoku Sensei Nūbē | TV Asahi | April 13, 1996 | August 7, 1997 |
| Boys Over Flowers | ABC | September 8, 1996 | August 31, 1997 |
| The King of Braves GaoGaiGar | NBN | February 1, 1997 | January 31, 1998 |
| Cutie Honey Flash | TV Asahi | February 15, 1997 | January 31, 1998 |
| Ninpen Manmaru | TV Asahi | July 5, 1997 | March 28, 1998 |
| Yume no Crayon Oukoku | ABC | September 7, 1997 | January 31, 1999 |
| Shinkai Densetsu Meremanoid | TV Asahi | October 9, 1997 | April 2, 1998 |
| Bomberman B-Daman Bakugaiden | NBN | February 7, 1998 | January 31, 1999 |
| Anime Shūkan DX! Mi-Pha-Pu | TV Asahi | February 14, 1998 | February 6, 1999 |
| Yu-Gi-Oh! | TV Asahi | April 4, 1998 | October 10, 1998 |
| Mamotte Shugogetten | TV Asahi | October 17, 1998 | April 3, 1999 |
| Bomberman B-Daman Bakugaiden V | NBN | February 7, 1999 | January 30, 2000 |
| Ojamajo Doremi | ABC | February 7, 1999 | January 30, 2000 |
| Kamikaze Kaito Jeanne | TV Asahi | February 13, 1999 | January 29, 2000 |
| Trouble Chocolate | TV Asahi | October 8, 1999 | March 24, 2000 |

=== 2000s ===
| Title | Premiere date | End date |
|---|---|---|
| Ojamajo Doremi Sharp | February 6, 2000 | January 28, 2001 |
| Mighty Cat Masked Niyander | February 6, 2000 | September 30, 2001 |
| Mōtto! Ojamajo Doremi | February 4, 2001 | January 27, 2002 |
| Ojamajo Doremi Dokkān! | February 3, 2002 | January 26, 2003 |
| Atashin'chi | April 19, 2002 | September 19, 2009 |
| Ashita no Nadja | February 2, 2003 | January 25, 2004 |
| Bobobo-bo Bo-bobo | November 8, 2003 | October 29, 2005 |
| Pretty Cure | February 1, 2004 | January 30, 2005 |
| Koi Kaze | April 1, 2004 | June 17, 2004 |
| Pretty Cure Max Heart | February 6, 2005 | January 29, 2006 |
| Kamichu! | June 28, 2005 | September 27, 2005 |
| Pretty Cure Splash Star | February 5, 2006 | January 28, 2007 |
| Princess Princess | April 5, 2006 | June 21, 2006 |
| Yes! Pretty Cure 5 | February 4, 2007 | January 27, 2008 |
| Yes! Pretty Cure 5 GoGo | February 3, 2008 | January 25, 2009 |
| Battle Spirits: Shounen Toppa Bashin | September 7, 2008 | September 6, 2009 |
| Fresh Pretty Cure! | February 1, 2009 | January 31, 2010 |

=== 2010s ===
| Title | Premiere date | End date |
|---|---|---|
| The Knight in the Area | January 7, 2012 | September 29, 2012 |
| Kirakira Pretty Cure a la Mode | February 5, 2017 | January 28, 2018 |

=== 2020s ===
| Title | Premiere date | End date |
|---|---|---|
| Healin' Good Pretty Cure | February 2, 2020 | February 21, 2021 |
| Tropical-Rouge! Pretty Cure | February 28, 2021 | January 30, 2022 |
| Delicious Party Pretty Cure | February 6, 2022 | January 29, 2023 |
| Blue Lock | October 9, 2022 | March 26, 2023 |
| 4-Nin wa Sorezore Uso wo Tsuku | October 16, 2022 | December 15, 2022 |
| Soaring Sky! Pretty Cure | February 5, 2023 | January 28, 2024 |
| My Tiny Senpai | July 2, 2023 | October 1, 2023 |
| Wonderful Pretty Cure! | February 4, 2024 | January 26, 2025 |
