= List of anime broadcast by Tokyo MX =

This is a list of current and former anime broadcast by Tokyo MX.

== # ==
- 86

== A ==
- To the Abandoned Sacred Beasts
- Astra Lost in Space
- Ai Tenchi Muyo!
- Aldnoah.Zero
- Arifureta: From Commonplace to World's Strongest
- Attack on Titan

== B ==
- BanG Dream!
- Beyblade Burst Superking
- Blood Lad
- Bocchi the Rock!
- B-Project
- Blend-S
- Black Lagoon

== C ==
- A Certain Magical Index
- Charlotte
- Cross Ange

== D ==
- Dance with Devils
- Darling in the Franxx
- Darwin's Game
- D4DJ
- Dr. Stone
- Do You Love Your Mom and Her Two-Hit Multi-Target Attacks?
- Don't Toy with Me, Miss Nagatoro
- Dororo
- Dragon Goes House-Hunting
- Dragon Pilot: Hisone and Masotan
- Drifters
- Demon Slayer: Kimetsu no Yaiba (Season 1)

== E ==
- Encouragement of Climb
- Ensemble Stars!

== F ==
- Fairy Gone
- Farewell, My Dear Cramer
- Fate/Extra Last Encore
- Fresh Pretty Cure!

== G ==
- Gargantia on the Verdurous Planet
- gdgd Fairies
- Girls und Panzer
- Godzilla Singular Point
- Golden Kamuy

== H ==
- Hanasaku Iroha
- How Heavy Are the Dumbbells You Lift?
- High School DxD
- High School Fleet
- Higehiro: After Being Rejected, I Shaved and Took in a High School Runaway

== I ==
- Is It Wrong to Try to Pick Up Girls in a Dungeon?
- Isekai Cheat Magician
- Isekai Quartet

== J ==
- JoJo's Bizarre Adventure
- Junji Ito Collection

== K ==
- Kantai Collection
- Karakuri Circus
- Kawaikereba Hentai demo Suki ni Natte Kuremasuka?
- Keijo
- Kimi to Fit Boxing
- Kirby: Right Back at Ya!
- Kono Oto Tomare! Sounds of Life

== L ==
- Last Hope
- Lord of Vermilion: The Crimson King
- Lost Song
- Love Live! Nijigasaki High School Idol Club
- Love Live! School Idol Project
- Love Live! Sunshine!!

== M ==
- Maō-sama, Retry!
- Megalobox 2: Nomad
- Midnight Occult Civil Servants
- Moriarty the Patriot
- Mob Psycho 100
- Mobile Suit Gundam-san
- My Unique Skill Makes Me OP Even at Level 1

== N ==
- Nagi-Asu: A Lull in the Sea
- Natsunagu!
- Ninja Kamui
- Noragami

== O ==
- Ongaku Shōjo
- Oreimo

== P ==
- Phantom in the Twilight
- A Place Further than the Universe
- Plastic Memories
- Princess Principal

== R ==
- Rascal Does Not Dream of Bunny Girl Senpai
- Re:Creators
- Release the Spyce
- RobiHachi
- RWBY: Ice Queendom

== S ==
- Sailor Moon Crystal
- Strike Witches
- School Babysitters
- Sewayaki Kitsune no Senko-san
- Seven Knights Revolution: Hero Successor
- Shadows House
- Shirobako
- Sirius the Jaeger
- Solo Leveling
- Space Dandy
- Spiritpact
- SSSS.Dynazenon
- SSSS.Gridman
- Star-Myu
- Strike Witches: 501st Joint Fighter Wing Take Off!
- Superbook (2011 reboot)
- Steins;Gate
- Steins;Gate 0
- Sword Art Online
- Sword Art Online: Alternative Gun Gale Online
- Sora No Method
- Smile PreCure!

== T ==
- Tada Never Falls in Love
- Tamako Market
- Teasing Master Takagi-san
- That Time I Got Reincarnated as a Slime
- Thunderbolt Fantasy
- Tiger & Bunny
- Tsuki ga Kirei
- Tokyo Ghoul
- To Love Ru

== V ==
- Vivy: Fluorite Eye's Song
- Vinland Saga (Season 2)

== W ==
- We Never Learn
- Wise Man's Grandchild

== Y ==
- Yatogame-chan Kansatsu Nikki

== Z ==
- Zombie Land Saga
