= List of mystery anime =

This is a list of mystery anime.

== A ==
- Ajin: Demi-Human
- Another
- Attack on Titan

== B ==
- Blood+
- Blood-C
- Boogiepop Phantom
- Bungou Stray Dogs

== C ==
- Case Closed series

== D ==
- Darker than Black
- Death Note
- Death Parade

== E ==
- Eden of the East
- Erased
- Ergo Proxy

== G ==
- Glass Maiden
- Ghost Hunt

== H ==
- Haruchika
- Heaven's Memo Pad
- Hell Girl series
- Higurashi When They Cry series
- Hyōka

== K ==
- Karakurizōshi Ayatsuri Sakon
- Kyōto Teramachi Sanjō no Holmes
- Kindaichi Case Files series

== M ==
- Mokke
- Mōryō no Hako
- Mysterious Joker

== P ==
- Paranoia Agent
- Psycho-Pass

== R ==
- Rampo Kitan: Game of Laplace
- Red Garden
- Re:Zero - Starting Life in Another World

== S ==
- Sorcerous Stabber Orphen: Beginning
- Sorcerous Stabber Orphen: Revenge
- Sorcerous Stabber Orphen: Wayward Journey (2020)

== T ==
- Tantei Opera Milky Holmes series
- Terror in Resonance
- Tantei Gakuen Q
- The Case Study of Vanitas

== U ==
- Umineko: When They Cry

== Y ==
- Yu Yu Hakusho
