= List of Muv-Luv Alternative episodes =

Muv-Luv Alternative
- Native name
- Kanji: マブラヴ オルタネイティヴ
- Revised Hepburn: Mabu-Ravu Orutaneitivu
- No. of episodes: 24

Release
- Original network: Fuji TV, TNC, Kansai TV, Tokai TV, UHB, BS Fuji
- Original release: October 7, 2021 – December 22, 2022

Muv-Luv Alternative (マブラヴ オルタネイティヴ, Mabu Ravu Orutaneitivu) is an anime adaptation based upon the visual novel of the same name.

At the conclusion of an October 2019 live event, âge presented the on-screen title "Muv-Luv Alternative in Animation", followed by a clip of new animation, seemingly indicating an anime adaptation of the original Muv-Luv Alternative visual novel. It was later announced that the new anime would be a television series. The series is animated by Yumeta Company and Graphinica, with production by Flagship Line, and is directed by Yukio Nishimoto, featuring Tatsuhiko Urahata handling the series' scripts, Takuya Tani designing the characters, and Evan Call composing the series' music. It aired from October 7 to December 23, 2021, on Fuji TV's +Ultra programming block. V.W.P performed the series' opening theme song "Rinne" (輪廻), while STEREO DIVE FOUNDATION performed the series' ending theme song "Tristar". Crunchyroll licensed the series outside of Asia. Muse Communication licensed the series in South and Southeast Asia.

At the end of the series' episode finale, a second season was announced. It aired from October 6 to December 22, 2022. (Note: Fuji TV lists the series premiere at 24:55 on October 5, 2022, which is effectively 12:55 a.m. JST on October 6.) JAM Project and Minami Kuribayashi performed the opening theme song "Akatsuki o Ute" (暁を撃て), while V.W.P performed the ending theme song "Saikai" (再会).

== Episode list ==
=== Season 1 ===
No.	Title	Directed by	Written by	Storyboarded by	Original release date
1	"The State of the World"; Transliteration: "Sekai no Nichijō" (Japanese: 世界の日常)	Takushi Shikatani	Atsuo Ishino, Tatsuhiko Urahata	Ryūta Ono, Hiroyuki Taiga, Yukio Nishimoto	October 7, 2021 (Note: This episode aired at 1:25 a.m. JST, 30 minutes after the original air time on Fuji TV.)
In the year 1973, hostile alien lifeforms called the BETA land on Earth and begin an invasion of the planet. By the year 1998, almost the entire Eurasian continent has fallen, devastating the global population to around 2 billion humans, and the BETA begin invading Japan, overrunning almost half of the island nation. In order to fight back, humanity has developed the Tactical Surface Fighter, large mechas specifically designed to combat BETA, but they are still fighting a losing battle. TSF pilot Sayoko Komaki is transferred to a Japanese military base in Sadogashima, which is a critical strategic defense point. However, a massive BETA force attacks Sadogashima, and despite the best efforts of Sayoko and the base's defenders, the BETA eventually overwhelm the defenses and begin overrunning the area. Instead of staying behind to fight, Sayoko is ordered to escort refugee transports for evacuation. As she and the survivors of Sadoga Island leave the area, it is later revealed that Sadoga Island soon became the site of the 21st BETA hive.
2	"Recurring Worlds"; Transliteration: "Kurikaesu Sekai" (Japanese: 繰り返す世界)	Shigeru Fukase	Tatsuhiko Urahata	Yukio Nishimoto	October 14, 2021 (Note: This episode aired at 1:15 a.m. JST, 20 minutes after the original air time on Fuji TV.)
In 2001, Takeru Shirogane awakes from a seeming nightmare where humanity enacted the Alternative V plan, which involved the evacuation of several hundred thousand colonists to another planet while leaving the rest of humanity behind to stage a last stand against the BETA. However, he realizes it was no dream, and instead a time loop has returned him to two months before Alternative V's execution. With his memories of the previous timeline, Takeru meets with scientist Yuuko Kouzuki at Yokohama Base. Takeru explains to Yuuko that he was transported from his native parallel universe where the BETA never existed. He also explains he knows Alternative V was only implemented as a backup in case Alternative IV, which Yuuko is in charge of, could not be completed. Intrigued, Yuuko decides to work with Takeru, but has him join the 207th TSF training squadron as a cover. He once again meets the alternate version of his teachers and classmates, instructor Marimo Jinguuji and pilot cadets Chizuru Sakaki, Meiya Misturugi, Kei Ayamine, and Miki Tamase with Mikoto Yoroi being absent due to hospitalization. Hoping to change the future, Takeru resolves to become a full fledged TSF pilot to find a way to make Alternative IV succeed.
3	"Something to Protect"; Transliteration: "Mamoritai Mono" (Japanese: 守りたいもの)	Takahiro Tanaka	Tatsuhiko Urahata	Tōru Takahashi	October 21, 2021
The United Nations commences Operation Lucifer, a military operation that results in the successful capture a BETA hive located in Yokohama. A UN team heads deep into the hive and are shocked to discover preserved human brains. Meanwhile, Takeru continues with his training, and decides to go meet Kasumi Yashiro, Yuuko's lab assistant. Takeru then asks about the whereabouts of another friend of his from his original world, Sumika Kagami. Yuuko reminds him no record of Sumika exists, and also reveals Alternative IV involves the use of Kasumi, who can communicate with a preserved human brain kept in Yuuko's lab. However, Takeru is worried he won't be able to change the future, as events have gone exactly as they had in the previous timeline. Takeru also meets Mikoto and realizes it's November, remembering that BETA will land on the Japanese mainland on November 11. Thanks to Takeru's prior knowledge, Yuuko puts the defenders on alert status, allowing them to repel the BETA with much fewer casualties. Two days later, Takeru and his friends undergo the Comprehensive Combat Skill Evaluation test and manage to pass it, earning them the right to become TSF pilots.
4	"Comrades"; Transliteration: "Nakama" (Japanese: 仲間)	Toshiyuki Sone	Atsuo Ishino	Hisashi Saitō	October 28, 2021 (Note: This episode aired at 1:05 a.m. JST, 10 minutes after the original air time on Fuji TV.)
After a brief leave period, Takeru and his friends return to training, with Takeru acing the simulator training due to his past experience in the previous timeline and his video game skills he learned in his original universe. In order to help his friends improve faster, Takeru decides to share his control data with them. With Yuuko's influence, the squadron also receives their Fubuki training TSFs much quick than normal, though a Royal Guard Takemikizuchi is also sent the base on the Shogun's request for Meiya's use, though she refuses to pilot it. As training progresses, Takeru wonders why they can't modify TSF controls to be more streamlined like a videogame, with the ability to execute combo moves and cancel automatic inputs. Yuuko is intrigued by the suggestion and agrees to implement the changes, intending to use Takeru and his friends as test pilots. The next day, Kasumi gives Takeru a picture of a Game Guy portable gaming device, which confuses him since video games don't exist in the current timeline. He also learns that the UN Undersecretary will be visiting Yokohama ahead of schedule, and he warns Yuuko this means the orbital HSST will crash. Yuuko reluctantly agrees to help prevent the crash, and Takeru discovers the Yokohama base has been built on top of the remains of the captured Yokohama Hive.
5	"A New Power"; Transliteration: "Atarashii Chikara" (Japanese: 新しい力)	Tsutomu Murakami	Takaaki Suzuki	Hiroshi Shirai	November 4, 2021
With the Undersecretary due to arrive, Takeru notices Miki in a panic. It's revealed that the Undersecretary is Miki's father, Genjousai Tamase, and she had accidentally led him to believe that she is her squadron's flight commander and is afraid of him finding out she lied. Takeru decides to have Miki pose as the flight lead for the day while Genjousai is visiting. It's later revealed that Genjousai's HSST transport was originally shot down in the past timeline, so Takeru's influence successfully saved his life. For an upcoming mock battle, Takeru has Yuuko install her newly developed control OS into his team's TSFs, which prove to be vastly more maneuverable and responsive than TSFs running on the old OS. Impressed with the results, Yuuko decides to implement the new OS on all of the 207th's TSFs for further testing. After the mock battle, Takeru follows Kasumi into Yuuko's office, where he encounters a mysterious man who knows his name.
6	"Transfer Experiment"; Transliteration: "Tensō Jikken" (Japanese: 転送実験)	Won Chang hee	Atsuo Ishino	Kenji Setō	November 11, 2021
The man introduces himself has Sakon Yoroi, a Japanese intelligence agent and Mikoto's father. He warns Yuuko that a group within the Japanese government called the "Strategic Studies Group" has formed, which may pose a threat to Alternative IV. He also expresses curiosity at how Takeru can be alive and how orders that can seemingly tell the future have been issued, but Yuuko asks him to leave rather than answer any questions. Meanwhile Mikoto notices Kei talking with an unknown man. Takeru then begins experiencing strange dreams of being back in his old world, and Yuuko theorizes that his original world is trying to pull him back and he is theoretically able to return any time he wants if he desires it enough, making his existence in the current world unstable. Yuuko then organizes an experiment to temporarily send Takeru back to his original world so she can figure out how her alternate self was able to solve an equation that's preventing her from completing Alternative IV. Takeru successfully travels back to his original world and talks to the original Yuuko. The original Yuuko believes Takeru, as his existence proves her theory on alternate worlds, and she promises to give him the formulas he needs in three days.
7	"Promise"; Transliteration: "Yakusoku" (Japanese: 約束)	Seiya Takatori	Takaaki Suzuki	Yukio Nishimoto, Tōru Takahashi	November 18, 2021
During his time in his original world, Takeru encounters Sumika and his memories of her return, reminding him how much he misses her. However, he resolves not to be tempted to stay in his original world until he can save the alternate one. Upon returning to the alternate world, Yuuko reveals that Kasumi is the result of Alternative III, which bred children with psychic potential in an effort to communicate with the BETA. As such, Kasumi has the ability to read thoughts, and acts as Takeru's anchor to the alternate world. Takeru then takes Kasumi outside to teach her there is more to life than her mission. The next day, Takeru gets into an argument with Meiya over the Japanese military forcibly evicting residents from a disaster zone, with Meiya believing the military shouldn't be acting against the people while Takeru points out the Japanese government doesn't have the resources to help everyone. Kei overhears the argument and runs away, prompting Takeru to follow her. He finds a mysterious letter that she drops, and he begins to think that she is a spy for the anti-Alternative faction just as Kei subdues him. Meanwhile, Japanese army officers dissatisfied with the government's actions begin to mobilize.
8	"The Capital in Chaos"; Transliteration: "Teito Dōran" (Japanese: 帝都動乱)	Michita Shiraishi	Tatsuhiko Urahata	Junji Nishimura	November 25, 2021 (Note: This episode aired at 1:00 a.m. JST, 5 minutes after the original air time on Fuji TV.)
The standoff between Takeru and Kei is interrupted when the base enters in alert status, as a rebel military faction led by Naoya Sagiri has staged a coup and seized the Japanese capital of Tokyo. Sagiri claims that he is acting in the best interests of the Japanese people by purging the corrupt government and seeking the Shogun's endorsement. Despite no civilians being killed in the uprising, many government officials have been assassinated, including the Prime Minister, who is also Chizuru's father. The interim Japanese reluctantly accepts offers of assistance from the UN and US military to retake Tokyo. Meanwhile, Takeru is concerned about Chizuru seeking revenge on Sagiri. Kei reveals that she is connected to Sagiri through her father, who was a general who was executed for disobeying orders to save civilians. The 207th then receives orders to deploy while fighting breaks out in Tokyo. Takeru private talks with Meiya, who is anxious about the fate of her sister, the Shogun.
9	"Battlefield"; Transliteration: "Senjō" (Japanese: 戦場)	Kōjin Ochi	Takaaki Suzuki	Ken Ōtsuka	December 2, 2021
Takeru comes across a woman named Yuuhi Koubuin and is shocked at her resemblance to Meiya. Sakon then arrives and reveals Yuuhi is the Shogun. In order to end the fighting in Tokyo, she has slipped out of the city and had Sakon leak her location to the rebels so that they will leave the city to chase after her. The 207th then receives new orders to take Yuuhi to the Yokohama Base. Yuuhi confirms to Takeru that she is Meiya's twin sister, and asks he give her one of her dolls in her stead since she and Meiya must officially remain estranged. Meanwhile, the rebel forces begin to mobilize and pursue the 207th, with Takeru reluctant to go at full speed with Yuuhi riding in his cockpit, as she does not have a flightsuit to protect her from the G-force. As the rebel forces begin to close in, an American force led by Major Walken intervenes and helps hold off the rebels long enough for the 207th to make the final sprint to safety. However, Yuuhi falls unconscious from the G-force.
10	"Resolve"; Transliteration: "Kakugo" (Japanese: 覚悟)	Tōru Takahashi	Atsuo Ishino	Yukio Nishimoto	December 9, 2021 (Note: This episode aired at 1:10 a.m. JST, 15 minutes after the original air time on Fuji TV.)
With Yuuhi unconscious, Walken orders Takeru to administer sedatives to her so they can keep moving, but Takeru hesitates while Marimo and Tsukuyomi advise that since Yuuhi is fatigued from lack of sleep, sedatives may negatively impact her health and advise they stop to give her a chance to rest, leaving both sides at a standoff. Takeru is left uncertain of what to until Yuuhi regains consciousness and requests he administer to sedative to her in order to minimize casualties from the conflict. Meanwhile, Naoya sends another unit led by Sayoko to break a line in the UN's defenses, only to be intercepted by the Valkyries, an elite UN squadron. While both sides take casualties, the Valkyries eventually wipe out the rebel unit, leaving Sayoko as the sole survivor. However, the attack is only a diversion as Sagiri boldly airdrops himself and his forces behind UN lines, blocking the 207th's escape route. Sagiri offers a 60 minute ceasefire after which the UN must hand over Yuuhi to him. Takeru meanwhile is frustrated at his hesitation and wonders why he is still lacking the resolve to do what he thinks is right.
11	"Everyone's Thoughts"; Transliteration: "Sorezore no Omoi" (Japanese: それぞれの想い)	Kiyotaka Ōhata	Takaaki Suzuki	Kiyotaka Ōhata	December 16, 2021
While on patrol, Miki meets and befriends Irma, a Finnish pilot who has joined the American army in hopes of one day liberating her BETA-occupied homeland of Finland. However, this exchange leaves Miki wondering if her father helped start the coup in order to involve American forces. Takeru meets Yuuhi, who instructs him that he will face many more hard decisions in the future and he should not hesitate. When Takeru mentions how all the pilots of the 207th are connected to Japan's leadership in some way, Yuuhi has them all summoned together and gives them a reassuring speech on how she plans to reform and take a greater role in the government once the coup is stopped. Meiya volunteers to become Yuuhi's body double so she can negotiate with Sagiri in her place. Takeru, a disguised Meiya, and Tsukuyomi meet Sagiri, and Meiya's please to his sense of honor cause Sagiri to stand down. However, he warns Meiya that the troops who instigated the fighting in Tokyo were working for an American intelligence agency, meaning America orchestrated the escalation of the coup as a setup. At that moment, Irma, apparently brainwashed, attacks Sagiri's troops, causing the ceasefire to break down.
12	"Fate"; Transliteration: "Shukumei" (Japanese: 宿命)	Yukio Nishimoto, Takushi Shikatani	Tatsuhiko Urahata	Hiroyuki Taiga, Kenji Setō	December 23, 2021
As fighting between both sides breaks out, Takeru attempts to flee with Meiya. Irma recovers from her brainwashing, but is killed by her teammate who then starts to fire on Takeru. Walken confronts the traitor, realizing he is a spy. The traitor attempts to flee but is cut down by Sagiri. Walken then confronts Sagiri, but due to the traitor sabotaging his TSF, Walken is quickly killed. Sagiri continues after Takeru, with Chiziru and Kei unable to stop him. Tsukuyomi then confronts Sagiri, pointing out that his rebellion has already exposed the government's corruption and will bring about the change he sought, so she will grant him an honorable death in battle. Sagiri, accepting that he will die regardless of the outcome, engages in one final duel with Tsukyomi and dies by her blade. With Sagiri's death, the rebel forces surrender and order is restored. Yuuhi promises to reform the government to prevent another uprising from happening again. The 207th mourn their lost loved ones and graduate from training, becoming full fledged TSF pilots. Meanwhile, Yuuko plots with Sakon as Alternative IV proceeds to its next stage.

=== Season 2 ===
No.	Title	Directed by	Written by	Storyboarded by	Original release date
1	"Graduation"; Transliteration: "Sotsugyō" (Japanese: 卒業)	Tōru Takahashi, (Note: Chief Episode Director (チーフ演出)); Yukio Nishimoto	Tatsuhiko Urahata	Yukio Nishimoto	October 6, 2022 (Note: This episode aired at 1:20 a.m. JST, 25 minutes after the original air time on Fuji TV.)
Takeru returns to his original world to obtain the original Yuuko's research notes needed for the completion of Alternative IV. While there, he briefly reunites with the original versions of his friends and classmates, including Sumika, and resolves to save the alternate world so he can return to his own. Upon returning to the alternate world, Yuuko is overjoyed that the development of the "00-Unit" can be completed. The next day, Takeru and the rest of the 207th are gathered together to attend their official graduation ceremony and are granted their TSF wings. The squad then thanks Marimo for all of the training she had provided them.
2	"XM3"	Jang Hee-kyu	Atsuo Ishino	Ryuta Ono	October 13, 2022 (Note: This episode aired at 1:20 a.m. JST, 25 minutes after the original air time on Fuji TV.)
Now that the 207th are a full fledged TSF squadron, Yuuko assigns them to participate in a series of exercises meant to demonstrate the capabilities of the new XM3 operating system, which Takeru helped develop. As part of the exercise, they will be competing against a squadron of TSF aces who have experience fighting the BETA. In the first round of exercises, the 207th manage to defeat the aces, greatly impressing them and instilling a sense of pride in Takeru that he may be making a difference in this timeline. However, in the next round of exercises, BETA suddenly attack the training grounds. Stuck with nonlethal training weapons, the aces order the 207th to return to the hangar and bring back live weapons, since their TSFs have greater speed. When the inexperienced 207th pilots falter, the aces resort to hypnotic suggestions and combat stimulates to remove their fear. However, Takeru has an adverse reaction to the stimulants and attacks the BETA instead, but his TSF is destroyed and he barely survives the battle. Afterwards, Takeru is left distressed at how powerless and afraid he felt during the battle. Marimo comforts Takeru, assuring him that everybody feels fear in their first battle against the BETA, including her. However, at that moment, a BETA ambushes Marimo and bites her head off, traumatizing Takeru.
3	"Escape"; Transliteration: "Tōbō" (Japanese: 逃亡)	Hiro Sugimura	Takaaki Suzuki	Hiro Sugimura	October 20, 2022 (Note: This episode aired at 1:20 a.m. JST, 25 minutes after the original air time on Fuji TV.)
Traumatized by Marimo's death, and believing it be caused by him changing the timeline, Takeru cracks under the pressure and decides to return to his original universe. Yuuko allows him to return, stating that he's served his purpose, but warns him that if he stays in his original world longer than 24 hours, he can't return to the alternative world, and if he can't maintain his sense of self, he will disappear from existence. Upon returning to his original world, Takeru becomes emotional when he meets the original Marimo again. However, she ends up being murdered by stalker. The original Yuuko angrily tells Takeru that he is transporting the causality from the alternative world to the original one, thus causing Marimo's death. She then warns Takeru to keep an eye for any changes to his environment. After Marimo's memorial service, Meiya comforts Takeru and offers to go on a date with him the next day, which is his birthday, to which Takeru accepts. Meanwhile, Sumika attempts to call Takeru and leaves a message on his phone asking to go a date with on him on his birthday as well.
4	"Diary"; Transliteration: "Nikki" (Japanese: 日記)	Sumito Sasaki	Atsuo Ishino	Kenji Setou	October 27, 2022
Takeru meets Meiya the next day for their outing, but is shocked when Meiya has apparently lost all her memories of him. Yuuko theorizes that since Takeru is a "causality conductor", his very existence is erasing his friends' memories of him. Takeru realizes that he can't interact with his friends anymore, and tries to push Sumika away. However, Sumika refuses to leave him, sensing that he is hurt. Takeru tells Sumika about his ordeals in the alternative world and his attempts to save it, as well as the alternative Marimo's death. Sumika believes Takeru's story and assures him that she won't forget him, and they kiss, confessing their love for each other. However, the next day, Takeru is dismayed to find out Sumika has lost her memories of him, too. Later, the ceiling in the gym suddenly collapses on top of Sumika, leaving her near death. Realizing he is a danger to his friends, Takeru begs Yuuko to make him disappear and she agrees. First, she shows Takeru Sumika's diaries, which show that she was losing her memories of him but was using her diaries to remind herself. Yuuko then tells Takeru that she will send him back to the alternative world, since if he can save that world and figure out what made him a causality conductor in the first place, he can undo all of the damage caused in the original world. With newfound resolve to save Sumika, Takeru agrees to be sent back to the alternative world.
5	"Return"; Transliteration: "Saiki" (Japanese: 再起)	Masashi Tsukino	Tatsuhiko Urahata	Yukio Nishimoto	November 3, 2022
Takeru and Yuuko break into the university laboratory in order to access the equipment needed to send Takeru back to the alternate world. Yuuko reveals that her alternate self left instructions on how to send him back as a contingency, though she realizes that her alternate self predicted this entire course of events. Yuuko uses Takeru's love for Sumika to lock on to the alternate world, and he tells him that the alternate Sumika must still be alive. Takeru returns to the alternate world, where the alternate Yuuko decides to recruit him to help care for the newly developed Type 00 Unit, which Takeru is shocked to discover looks identical to Sumika. Yuuko explains that she hid Takeru's absence by telling the others he was sent on a classified mission. Takeru is then assigned to the A-01 Squadron, "Isumi's Valkyries", who perform special missions for Alternative IV directly under Yuuko's command. His friends have also been assigned to the Valkyries, and with him returned, they all pay their respects to Marimo's makeshift memorial.
6	"Sumika"; Transliteration: "Sumika" (Japanese: 純夏)	Shin Katagi, Takushi Shikatani, Hiroshi Kitamura	Atsuo Ishino	Hiroshi Kitamura	November 10, 2022
Yuuko explains that Sumika was the brain that was being kept in her lab, as she was the only living human prisoner taken by the BETA before she was rescued during the capture of the Yokohama Hive. Since Sumika is their best chance at establishing communication with the BETA, Yuuko had her personality transplanted into a new body, and in order to stabilize it, she needs Takeru's help. The next few days are spent training with his squadron as well as spending time with Sumika. However, Sumika is still traumatized from her time in BETA captivity, and always has a nervous breakdown while declaring she will kill all the BETA to take revenge for the alternate Takeru's death. Yuuko explains the importance of getting Sumika ready for combat, as she reveals she deliberately released the BETA that attacked the base during the training exercise that resulted in Marimo's death in order to test the base's readiness. She then gives an angry Takeru a chance to kill her in revenge, but he declines, stating he wants to focus on saving the world and Sumika. With Takeru spending more time with her, Sumika's personality begins to stabilize enough for Yuuko to believe that she will be ready for her combat assessment, which will take place on the battlefield.
7	"The Night Before the Attack"; Transliteration: "Shutsugeki Zen'ya" (Japanese: 出撃前夜)	Daisuke Nishimura	Tatsuhiko Urahata	Yukio Nishimoto	November 17, 2022
The Valkyries are briefed that the UN and IJA will be commencing a joint operation to destroy the Sadogashima Hive. The Valkyries are tasked with protecting the new weapon developed by Alternative IV, the Susano-O Mark II, a prototype mobile fortress specifically designed to destroy BETA hives. Sakura, a survivor of the fall of Sadogashima, is left anxious about the operation. Takeru and his friends are also anxious at the thought of fighting the BETA for the first time. Tsukiyomi then approaches Takeru and privately informs him that the Shogunate has decided to withdraw Royal Guard protection from Meiya now that her existence has become public knowledge, afraid that acknowledging her will make her a potential political pawn for America. Takeru agrees to watch over Meiya in their place. The Valkyries then commence rigorous training to prepare for the attack. On the night before the attack, the Valkyries board the transport ship bound for Sadogashima. During the trip, Takeru encounters Isumi and asks her what she would do if there was someone she had feelings for in her squad. Isumi admits that her childhood crush and her younger sister are participating in the operation as well. Takeru tells Isumi about his attraction to Sumika and she orders him to survive the mission so he can spend more time with Sumika.
8	"Operation 21st" Transliteration: "Kō 21 Gōsakusen" (Japanese: 甲21号作戦)	Masashi Tsukino	Takaaki Suzuki	Ken Ōtsuka	November 24, 2022
The UN and IJA commence their assault on Sadogashima, with the IJA commencing a major diversionary landing operation on one side of the island while the Valkyries and Susano-O land on the other side. Despite heavy casualties, the human forces make significant progress and UN squadrons manage to breach the hive. However, the BETA manage to ambush and destroy the squadrons inside the hive and mobilize their full forces, sending the bulk of them towards the Susano-O's firing position. Since they are the only line of defense between the BETA and the Susano-O, the Valkyries prepare an ambush for the BETA vanguard, successfully destroying them from behind before heading out to eliminate the Laser-class BETA in the rear. However, BETA resistance is still heavy, so Takeru volunteers to act as a diversion so the rest of the Valkyries can reach the Laser-class.
9	"The Light of Victory"; Transliteration: "Kibō No Hikari" (Japanese: 希望の光)	Jang Hee-kyu	Atsuo Ishino	Ryuta Ono	December 1, 2022
Despite being heavily outnumbered and surrounded, Takeru manages to slaughter the BETA forces sent against him, giving the rest of the Valkyries the opening they need to eliminate the Laser-class BETA. Meanwhile, the Royal Guard enters the battle in order to hold the line at the diversionary landing zone. The Susano-O then arrives and manages to destroy the Sadogashima Hive with two massive particle beam shots, proving that humanity now has a superweapon against the BETA. However, after the second shot, Sumika inexplicably loses consciousness. Yuuko instructs Takeru to extract Sumika and evacuate her from the island while Isumi tries to manually activate the Susano-O's autopilot, with the contingency plan of demolishing the Susano-O if there is a risk of the BETA capturing it. The remaining BETA on the island then begin to dig to the surface, leaving the Valkyries with little time to recover the Susano-O.
10	"Escape"; Transliteration: "Dasshutsu" (Japanese: 脱出)	Masashi Tsukino	Tatsuhiko Urahata	Ken Ōtsuka	December 8, 2022
The Japanese navy and the Valkyries head out to attack the BETA and clear an escape path for Takeru and Sumika to leave the island while Isumi continues to try and reactivate the Susano-O. However, the BETA appear to be aware of their plans, and shift the focus towards intercepting Takeru and attacking the Susano-O. Just as Takeru and the Valkyries reach the coast, a massive formation of BETA appear and block their path. Meanwhile, more BETA begin to close in on the Susano-O which Isumi is still unable to reactivate.
11	"Inheritance"; Transliteration: "Keishō" (Japanese: 継承)	Jang Hee-kyu	Takaaki Suzuki	Ryuta Ono	December 15, 2022
With the Valkyries' escape cut off and the Susano-O surrounded by BETA, Isumi decides to reactivate the Susano-O to lure all the BETA on the island to her and then self destruct to wipe them all out. Kashiwagi dies buying time for Isumi to reactivate the Susano-O and commence the self destruct sequence. Sensing the Susano-O's activation, the BETA head straight for it, leaving an opening for the Valkyries to evacuate. Yuuko is able to open a private communications line to Isumi, informs her that her sister survived the battle, and thanks her for everything she did for Alternative IV. Isumi instructs Takeru to watch over the Valkryies, as she is confident he will be Humanity's savior. Finally, Isumi gives her final farewells to the Valkyries, assigning Hayase to take command. The Susano-O then explodes and destroys the entire island of Sadogashima while Isumi meets her comrades in the afterlife.
12	"The World Moves On"; Transliteration: "Susumu Sekai" (Japanese: 進む世界)	Yukio Nishimoto	Tatsuhiko Urahata	Yukio Nishimoto	December 22, 2022
In the aftermath of the destruction of Sadogashima, while the BETA hive is destroyed, much of Japan's coastline is devastated from the resulting tsunami. While there are no civilian casualties thanks to a prepared evacuation, the IJA is forced to move their defense lines back farther than expected. A national day of mourning is declared for all the soldiers who lost their lives, and Isumi's sisters are given notification of her death, though it is covered up as a training accident due to the existence of the Valkyries being a secret. Hayase officially takes command of the Valkyries and they are told their next target is Hive 20 in Korea. The Valkyries spend the rest of the day mourning the loss of Isumi and Kashiwagi. Takeru meets with Sumika, who feared he would leave her for Meiya, but Takeru reassures her that he loves only her. Yuuko theorizes that Sumika's jealousy caused her ODL levels to drop, resulting her falling unconscious during the mission. She also reveals Sumika successfully accessed the BETA hive network and was able to provide comprehensive maps of all BETA hives on Earth, which she can use to plan future assaults. She also assures Takeru that Isumi's death was by her own choice, and that he shouldn't blame himself for it, and compliments him for being able to stabilize Sumika's personality in just days. Outside, Sakaki, Meiya, Kei, Mikoto, and Miki move Marimo's memorial to the cherry blossom tree in front of the base so that she can symbolically rest alongside Isumi. The group then recalls Isumi's final words of advice to them and resolve to surpass both her and Marimo. Later, Takeru, Sumika, and Kasumi visit the cherry blossom tree together where he resolves to save the world so he can be together with Sumika.
